= Slammiversary (2006) =

2006 Total Nonstop Action Wrestling pay-per-view event

- Promotional poster featuring various TNA wrestlers
- Promotion: Total Nonstop Action Wrestling
- Date: June 18, 2006
- City: Orlando, Florida
- Venue: Impact Zone
- Attendance: 900
- Tagline: This is the One

Pay-per-view chronology
← Previous; Sacrifice	Next → Victory Road

Slammiversary chronology
← Previous; 2005	Next → 2007

The 2006 Slammiversary was a professional wrestling pay-per-view (PPV) event produced by Total Nonstop Action Wrestling, which took place on June 18, 2006 from the Impact Zone in Orlando, Florida. It was the second event under the Slammiversary chronology and marked the fourth anniversary of the promotion. Seven professional wrestling matches were featured on the event's card.

== Results ==
No.	Results	Stipulations	Times
1^{P}	Team Canada (Eric Young and A-1) defeated The Naturals (Andy Douglas and Chase Stevens)	Tag team match	2:11
2	Team 3D (Brother Ray and Brother Devon) defeated The James Gang (B.G. James and Kip James)	Bingo Hall Brawl	10:19
3	Rhino defeated Team Canada (Bobby Roode and Coach D'Amore)	Handicap match	11:00
4	Senshi defeated Sonjay Dutt, Alex Shelley, Shark Boy, Petey Williams and Jay Lethal	X Division Rankings Elimination match to determine #1 contender to the TNA X Division Championship	19:29
5	Kevin Nash (with Alex Shelley) defeated Chris Sabin	Singles match	8:20
6	A.J. Styles and Christopher Daniels defeated America's Most Wanted (Chris Harris and James Storm) (c) (with Gail Kim)	Last Chance match for the NWA World Tag Team Championship	17:44
7	Samoa Joe defeated Scott Steiner	Singles match	13:04
8	Jeff Jarrett defeated Christian Cage (c), Abyss (with James Mitchell), Ron "The Truth" Killings and Sting	King of the Mountain match for the NWA World Heavyweight Championship	23:00
(c) / – the champion(s) heading into the match; P / – the match was broadcast on the pre-show

=== X Division Six-man elimination match ===
Elimination	Wrestler	Eliminated by	Elimination move
1	Shark Boy	Sonjay Dutt	Pinned after Running shooting star press
2	Alex Shelley	Jay Lethal	Pinned after a Flipping release dragon suplex
3	Jay Lethal	Petey Williams	Pinned after a Canadian Destroyer
4	Petey Williams	Senshi	Pinned after a Warrior's Way
5	Sonjay Dutt	Senshi	Pinned after a Warrior's Wrath
Winner:	Senshi		

=== King of the Mountain match statistics ===
No.	Wrestler	Wrestler pinned or made to submit	Method
1	Ron Killings	Jeff Jarrett	Pinned after a missile dropkick
2	Christian Cage	Abyss	Pinned by a Schoolboy
3	Jeff Jarrett	Ron Killings	Pinned after The Stroke onto the metal guardrail
4	Abyss	Jeff Jarrett	Pinned after a Black Hole slam
5	Sting	Jeff Jarrett	Pinned after a Scorpion Death Drop and making the three count using the unconscious referee's hand
Winner	Jeff Jarrett	N/A	Jarrett scaled a ladder and hung the NWA World Heavyweight Championship belt to win
