= No Surrender (2006) =

2006 Total Nonstop Action Wrestling pay-per-view event

- DVD cover featuring A.J. Styles, Christopher Daniels, Hernandez, Homicide, and Konnan
- Promotion: Total Nonstop Action Wrestling
- Date: September 24, 2006
- City: Orlando, Florida
- Venue: TNA Impact! Zone
- Attendance: 900

Pay-per-view chronology
← Previous; Hard Justice	Next → Bound for Glory

No Surrender chronology
← Previous; 2005	Next → 2007

The 2006 No Surrender was a professional wrestling pay-per-view (PPV) event produced by Total Nonstop Action Wrestling (TNA), which took place on September 24, 2006, at the TNA Impact! Zone in Orlando, Florida. It was the second event under the No Surrender chronology. Eight professional wrestling matches were featured on the event's card. At the end of the event, it was announced that Kurt Angle had been signed with TNA.

In October 2017, with the launch of the Global Wrestling Network, the event became available to stream on demand.

== Storylines ==
The event featured professional wrestling matches that involve different wrestlers from pre-existing scripted feuds and storylines. Professional wrestlers portray villains, heroes, or less distinguishable characters in the scripted events that build tension and culminate in a wrestling match or series of matches.

== Event ==
Other on-screen personnel
Role:	Name:
Commentators	Mike Tenay
Commentators	Don West
Interviewer	Jeremy Borash
Interviewer	Shane Douglas
Ring announcers	Jeremy Borash
Ring announcers	David Penzer
Referees	Earl Hebner
Referees	Rudy Charles
Referees	Mark Johnson
Referees	Andrew Thomas

Prior to the start of the pay-per-view there was a dark match between Bobby Roode and Vaughn Doring. Roode pinned Doring after The Payoff to pick up the victory.

The first match of the pay-per-view saw Eric Young take on A-1. Young picked up the victory on A-1 after a Showstopper.

The second match saw Jay Lethal defeat Petey Williams when Lethal pinned Williams with a roll-up.

The next match was a No Disqualification 3-Way Dance between Abyss, Raven, and Brother Runt. Abyss pinned Raven after a Black Hole Slam to pick up the victory.

A 16-man triple Chance tag team battle royal was next. Under the rules of the match, when a wrestler got eliminated they would stay at ringside until their partner was eliminated. When the match got down to 2 people, their partners re-joined them and the match continued as a tag team match. The winner of the battle royal would become number one contenders to the NWA World Tag Team Championship. The match ultimately saw The Naturals (Andy Douglas and Chase Stevens) (with Shane Douglas) successfully eliminating The James Gang (B.G. James and Kip James), America's Most Wanted (Chris Harris and James Storm), The Paparazzis (Alex Shelley and Johnny Devine), The Diamonds in the Rough (David Young and Elix Skipper), Maverick Matt and Kazarian, Ron Killings and Lance Hoyt, Shark Boy and Norman Smiley. The match ended when Stevens pinned Storm with a roll-up.

The TNA X Division Championship match was next. This match saw Senshi successfully defend his title against Chris Sabin. Senshi picked up the victory after he pinned Sabin after kicking an inflatable doll into Sabin.

The next match saw Christian Cage defeat Rhino when Cage pinned Rhino after an Unprettier onto a steel chair.

The second to last match was an Ultimate X match for the NWA World Tag Team Championship. The Latin American Exchange (Hernandez and Homicide) defended their titles against A.J. Styles and Christopher Daniels. Daniels grabbed one of the belts to win. This match was later named TNA's "Match of the Year".

The main event was a "Fan's Revenge" Lumberjack match between Samoa Joe and Jeff Jarrett. The lumberjacks were 18 audience members equipped with leather straps. Joe pinned Jarrett after a Muscle Buster to pick up the victory.

== Results ==
No.	Results	Stipulations	Times
1^{D}	Bobby Roode defeated Vaughn Doring	Singles match	4:28
2	Eric Young defeated A-1	Singles match	6:20
3	Jay Lethal defeated Petey Williams	Singles match	7:25
4	Abyss (with James Mitchell) defeated Raven and Brother Runt	No Disqualification match	11:30
5	The Naturals (Andy Douglas and Chase Stevens) (with Shane Douglas) defeated seven other teams*	Triple Chance battle royal to determine #1 contenders to the NWA World Tag Team Championship	14:25
6	Senshi (c) defeated Chris Sabin	Singles match for the TNA X Division Championship	17:15
7	Christian Cage defeated Rhino	Singles match	16:30
8	A.J. Styles and Christopher Daniels defeated The Latin American Exchange (Hernandez and Homicide) (c) (with Konnan)	Ultimate X match for the NWA World Tag Team Championship	15:30
9	Samoa Joe defeated Jeff Jarrett	Fan's Revenge Lumberjack match	11:06
(c) / – the champion(s) heading into the match; D / – this was a dark match

* Other teams for battle royal were The James Gang (B.G. James and Kip James), America's Most Wanted (Chris Harris and James Storm) (with Gail Kim), The Paparazzis (Alex Shelley and Johnny Devine), The Diamonds in the Rough (David Young and Elix Skipper) (with Simon Diamond), Maverick Matt and Kazarian, Ron Killings and Lance Hoyt, Shark Boy and Norman Smiley

== See also ==
- 2006 in professional wrestling
