= Hard Justice (2006) =

2006 Total Nonstop Action Wrestling pay-per-view event

- DVD cover featuring Jeff Jarrett, Samoa Joe, Sting, Christian Cage, Scott Steiner
- Promotion: Total Nonstop Action Wrestling
- Date: August 13, 2006
- City: Orlando, Florida
- Venue: Impact Zone
- Attendance: 900

Pay-per-view chronology
← Previous; Victory Road	Next → No Surrender

Hard Justice chronology
← Previous; 2005	Next → 2007

The 2006 Hard Justice was a professional wrestling pay-per-view (PPV) event produced by Total Nonstop Action Wrestling (TNA), which took place on August 13, 2006, at the Impact Zone in Orlando, Florida. It was the second event under the Hard Justice chronology. Nine matches were scheduled on the event's card, but because of a pyrotechnical malfunction, one was cancelled due to time constraints.

In October 2017, with the launch of the Global Wrestling Network, the event became available to stream on demand.

== Storylines ==
Hard Justice featured ten professional wrestling matches and two pre-show matches that involved different wrestlers from pre-existing scripted feuds and storylines. Wrestlers portrayed villains, heroes, or less distinguishable characters in the scripted events that built tension and culminated in a wrestling match or series of matches.

== Results ==
During the match between Eric Young and Johnny Devine, the padding on the lighting above the ring caught fire due to the opening pyro. The fire was extinguished but the fire brigade ordered the evacuation of the arena and the event was suspended for 15 minutes before fans were allowed to re-enter and the event could continue. One TNA worker was sent to hospital for smoke inhalation after tackling the fire. In the next match, Chris Sabin defeated Alex Shelley to become the number one contender for the TNA X Division Championship. Abyss defeated Brother Runt by pin after a Black Hole Slam onto thumbtacks. In the next match, Samoa Joe defeated Rhino and Monty Brown by a pinfall on Brown after Rhino missed a Gore into tables and Joe put Brown through a table with an STO. Gail Kim pinned Sirelda whilst Senshi defeated Petey Williams and Jay Lethal to retain the X Division Championship.

In the next match for the NWA World Tag Team Championships, AJ Styles and Christopher Daniels defeated Homicide and Hernandez of the Latin American Xchange. In the main event, the NWA World's Heavyweight Championship was contested between champion Jeff Jarrett and Sting with Scott Steiner and Christian Cage in the corner of each respectively. Jarrett won the match by pin after Christian turned heel on Sting by hitting him with Jarrett's guitar.

No.	Results	Stipulations	Times
1^{P}	Ron Killings defeated A-1	Singles match	3:09
2^{P}	Sonjay Dutt and Cassidy Riley defeated Jimmy Jacobs and El Diablo	Tag team match	3:08
3	Eric Young defeated Johnny Devine	Singles match	5:46
4	Chris Sabin defeated Alex Shelley (with Kevin Nash and Johnny Devine)	Singles match to determine #1 contender to the TNA X Division Championship at No Surrender	8:19
5	Abyss (with James Mitchell) defeated Brother Runt	Singles match	6:17
6	Samoa Joe defeated Rhino and Monty Brown	Falls Count Anywhere match	13:37
7	Gail Kim defeated Sirelda	Singles match	4:01
8	Senshi (c) defeated Petey Williams and Jay Lethal	Three-Way Dance for the TNA X Division Championship	10:35
9	AJ Styles and Christopher Daniels (c) defeated The Latin American Exchange (Homicide and Hernandez) (with Konnan)	Tag team match for the NWA World Tag Team Championship	14:37
10	Jeff Jarrett (c) (with Scott Steiner) defeated Sting (with Christian Cage)	Singles match for the NWA World Heavyweight Championship	15:09
(c) / – the champion(s) heading into the match; P / – the match was broadcast on the pre-show
