= Bound for Glory (2006) =

2006 Total Nonstop Action Wrestling pay-per-view event

- Promotional poster featuring various TNA wrestlers
- Promotion: Total Nonstop Action Wrestling
- Date: October 22, 2006
- City: Plymouth Township, Michigan
- Venue: Compuware Sports Arena
- Attendance: 3,600

Pay-per-view chronology
| ← Previous; No Surrender | Next → Genesis |

Bound for Glory chronology
| ← Previous; 2005 | Next → 2007 |

The 2006 Bound for Glory was a professional wrestling pay-per-view (PPV) event produced by Total Nonstop Action Wrestling, which took place on October 22, 2006, from the Compuware Sports Arena in the Detroit suburb of Plymouth Township, Michigan. It was the second event under the Bound for Glory chronology.

Eight matches were featured on the event's card. In the main event, Sting defeated Jeff Jarrett for the NWA World Heavyweight Championship in a Title vs. Career match. In other prominent matches, Samoa Joe defeated Abyss, Brother Runt and Raven in a Monster's Ball match, Chris Sabin defeated Senshi to become the new Impact X Division Champion, Christian Cage defeated Rhino in an 8 Mile Street Fight, and in the opening contest Austin Starr won a Gauntlet Battle Royal by last eliminating Jay Lethal to become the #1 contender to the X Division Championship.

Bound for Glory was the first TNA pay-per-view event held in a location other than Nashville, Tennessee, or Orlando, Florida, since the first two weekly pay-per-views in June 2002, which were held in Huntsville, Alabama. The Compuware Sports Arena was also the site of the first TNA house show. This was the first pay-per-view to feature a half-hour "Road to" preview airing the night before. This continued for future pay-per-views. This was the first and only time that all of TNA's active championships at the time changed hands in one night.

In October 2017, with the launch of the Global Wrestling Network, the event became available to stream on demand.

== Results ==
| No. | Results | Stipulations | Times |
|---|---|---|---|
| 1^{P} | Bobby Roode (with Traci Brooks) defeated Lance Hoyt | Singles match | 4:00 |
| 2 | Austin Starr won by last eliminating Jay Lethal | Kevin Nash Open Invatational X Division Gauntlet Battle Royal | 17:24 |
| 3 | Team 3D (Brother Ray and Brother Devon) defeated America's Most Wanted (Chris Harris and James Storm), The James Gang (B.G. James and Kip James), and The Naturals (Chase Stevens and Andy Douglas) (with Shane Douglas) | Four-Way match | 7:02 |
| 4 | Samoa Joe defeated Abyss (with Father James Mitchell), Brother Runt and Raven | Monster's Ball match with Jake Roberts as Special Guest Referee | 11:51 |
| 5 | Eric Young defeated Larry Zbyszko | Loser Gets Fired match | 3:35 |
| 6 | Chris Sabin defeated Senshi (c) | Singles match for the TNA X Division Championship | 13:00 |
| 7 | Christian Cage defeated Rhino | 8 Mile Street Fight | 14:44 |
| 8 | The Latin American Xchange (Homicide and Hernandez) (with Konnan) defeated A.J. Styles and Christopher Daniels (c) | Six Sides of Steel match for the NWA World Tag Team Championship | 14:50 |
| 9 | Sting defeated Jeff Jarrett (c) | Title vs. Career match for the NWA World Heavyweight Championship with Kurt Angle as special outside enforcer | 15:11 |
(c) / – the champion(s) heading into the match; P / – the match was broadcast on the pre-show

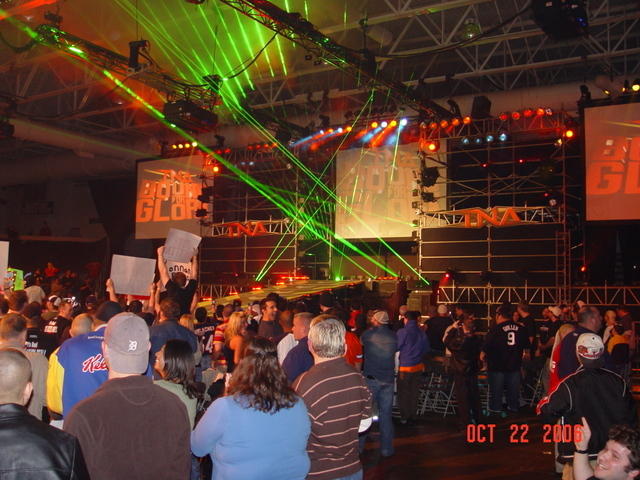
The Bound for Glory set

=== Kevin Nash Open Invitational X Division Gauntlet Battle Royal entrances and eliminations ===
| Entrant | | Eliminated by | |
|---|---|---|---|
| 1 | Austin Starr | - | Winner |
| 2 | Sonjay Dutt | 1 | Matt and Kazarian |
| 3 | Maverick Matt | 4 | Shark Boy and D-Ray |
| 4 | Jay Lethal | 15 | Starr |
| 5 | A-1 | 3 | Matt and Kazarian |
| 6 | Zach Gowen | 5 | Devine |
| 7 | Kazarian | 6 | Starr |
| 8 | Sirelda | 2 | A-1 |
| 9 | Shark Boy | 8 | Shelley |
| 10 | Alex Shelley | 14 | Starr |
| 11 | D-Ray 3000 | 7 | Starr |
| 12 | Johnny Devine | 13 | Starr |
| 13 | Elix Skipper | 10 | Mark "Slick" Johnson^{1} |
| 14 | Short Sleeve Sampson | 9 | Shelley |
| 15 | Norman Smiley | 11 | Mark "Slick" Johnson^{1} |
| 16 | Petey Williams | 12 | Shelley |

1. Johnson was not an official entrant.
