= AJ Styles and Christopher Daniels =

Professional wrestling tag team

A.J. Styles and Christopher Daniels
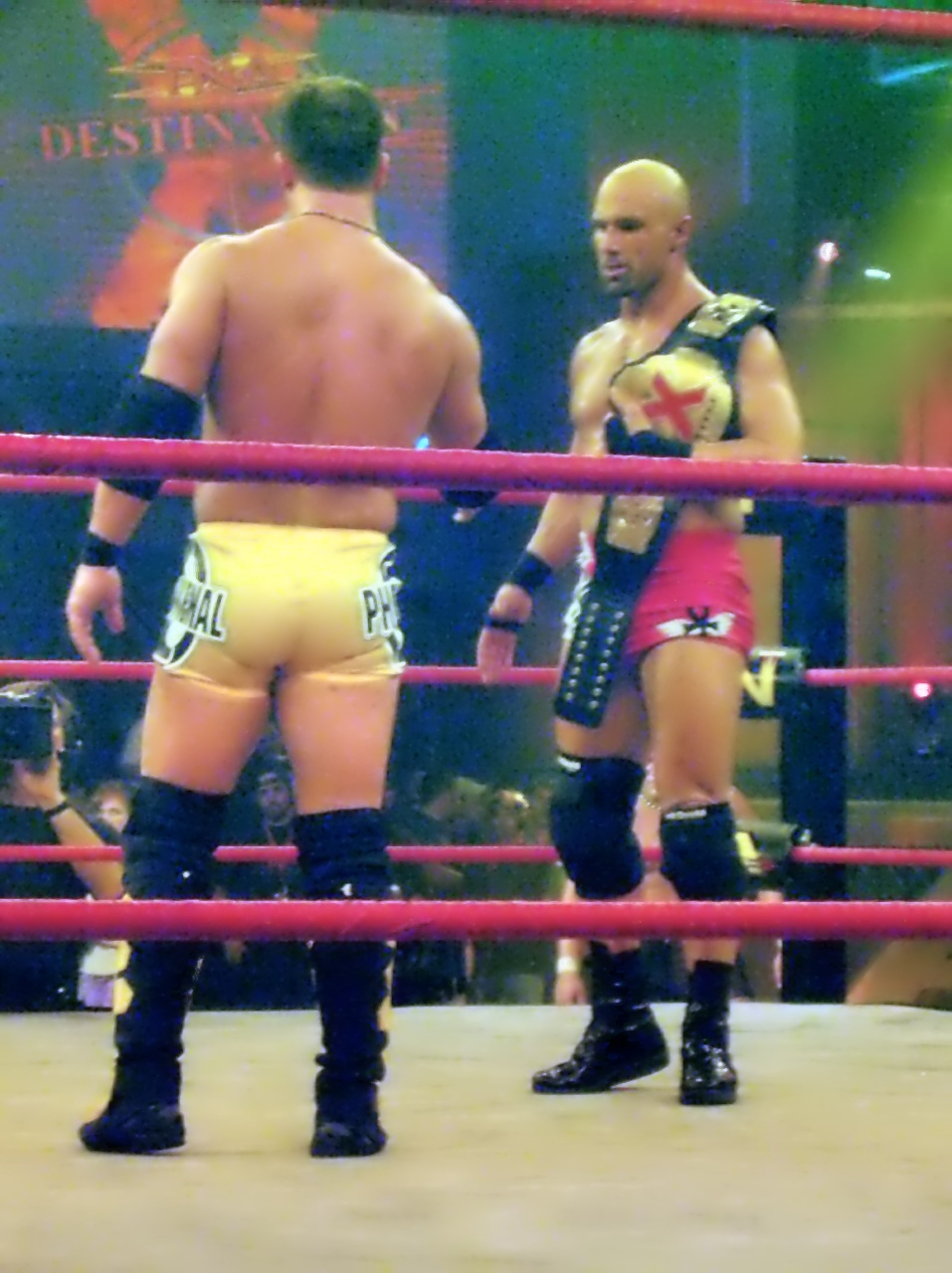
- Styles (left) and Daniels (right) at Destination X

Tag team
- Members: A.J. Styles; Christopher Daniels
- Name(s): A.J. Styles and Christopher Daniels; Fortune
- Billed heights: 5 ft 11 in (1.80 m) - Styles; 6 ft 0 in (1.83 m) - Daniels
- Combined billed weight: 440 lb (200 kg); 218 lb (99 kg) - Styles; 225 lb (102 kg) - Daniels
- Former members: Sirelda (valet)
- Debut: May 2006
- Disbanded: November 26, 2006
- Years active: 2006

A.J. Styles and Christopher Daniels were recurring tag team partners in Total Nonstop Action Wrestling (TNA), having won the NWA World Tag Team Championship two times in their regular run as teammates. In real life, A.J. Styles and Christopher Daniels are best friends, and both men have named their sons' middle names after one another - Styles' son, Ajay Covell Jones, with Daniels' real last name, and Daniels' son, Joshua Allen Covell, with Styles' real first name, from which comes the A. in A.J. Styles. This fact was referenced in the storylines that followed the 2009 return of Daniels in TNA.

== History ==
=== Championship success ===
Styles and Daniels were originally linked together in TNA through the Vince Russo-led faction known as Sports Entertainment Xtreme. Daniels was a member of the X-Division trio assembled by Russo known as Triple X, along with Low Ki and Elix Skipper, whereas Styles was the on-again, off-again centerpiece of the group. However, particular interaction between the two was limited at the time, and their association faded out following the dissolution of SEX.

Their first notable interactions came throughout their feuds for the TNA X Division Championship. The two feuded for most of 2005 over the title, with Styles as the fan favorite cornerstone of the division and Daniels as a villain driven by jealousy and ego. To add backstory to Daniels' motivation, reference was occasionally made to the first match the two ever had against one another back in October 2001 before the inception of TNA. Some of the most notable matches between the two include the series of three way matches they had with Samoa Joe: their three-way main event match for the title at Unbreakable in particular is still widely considered one of the top matches in the company's history.

Things changed, however, after Samoa Joe critically injured Daniels at the Genesis pay-per-view in November 2005, leaving Daniels with a major concussion. After his return from the injury, Daniels seemed to turn into a fan favorite, and came to the assistance of Styles at Turning Point, after Styles lost the X Title to Joe, when Joe tried to injure Styles the same way he injured Daniels.

On the New Year's Eve episode of TNA Impact!, Daniels again saved Styles when a singles match with James Storm of America's Most Wanted went awry. This led to a match for the NWA World Tag Team Championship with AMW later that night on a midnight special, which AMW won after considerable interference.

From that point on, Daniels and Styles continued their feud with Samoa Joe. Their newfound friendship, however, was threatened at Final Resolution 2006 when Styles threw in the towel on Daniels' behalf, ending their X Division Title bout when Joe refused to let go of a Coquina Clutch and Daniels refused to tap out. After two three-ways between them, including an Ultimate X match at Destination X 2006 where Daniels won the title after Joe couldn't climb the X structure, Styles and Daniels solidified their friendship.

After Daniels lost the title back to Samoa Joe in April 2006, though, the two began teaming up more, partially as part of a larger grouping of fan favorites who were opposing Jeff Jarrett's faction Planet Jarrett. As part of this large feud, the two began to specifically team up often in a series of title matches against America's Most Wanted, then the NWA World Tag Team Champions.

The major theme of this feud saw Styles and Daniels continuously being screwed via interference from Gail Kim. Eventually though, at Slammiversary 2006, the two finally won the titles when they brought a debuting Sirelda to keep Gail Kim from interfering in the match.

In July 2006, amidst storyline criticism of the two as a team, Styles and Daniels produced a series of envelopes containing contracts with every tag team in TNA to prove that they are fighting champions. Konnan interrupted them from the Spanish announce table and accused them of not having The Latin American Xchange (LAX) within their contracts, and called them racist. Styles quickly pulled out LAX's envelope and the team came down to the Spanish announce table to have Konnan sign it. They were then ambushed by Homicide and Hernandez and beaten down, with Daniels being busted open. Konnan then signed the contract using Daniels blood, sealing the team's title defense against LAX at Hard Justice 2006. At the event, Styles and Daniels successfully defended the titles.

On the August 24 edition of TNA Impact!, Styles and Daniels defended their tag titles against Hernandez and Homicide in a rematch of Hard Justice 2006 in a Border Brawl match. They subsequently lost them after interference from Konnan. The next week on the August 31 episode of Impact!, Styles and Daniels used their rematch clause for No Surrender 2006 in the first-ever tag team Ultimate X match against LAX, a match which they won and became two-time NWA World Tag Team Champions.

At Bound for Glory 2006, Styles and Daniels lost their titles to LAX in a Six Sides of Steel match.

At Genesis 2006, the two had their final falling out after Daniels got involved in Styles' match against Christian Cage and accidentally cost him the bout. The team had what was billed as their last match against The Naturals on the November 23 show, winning. Although Styles and Daniels would both turn villainous since, the team did not officially reform, as by the time Daniels turned, Styles was already a member of Christian's Coalition. They would only team up twice in matches before Daniels headed the revival of his former stable Triple X.

=== Unofficial reunions ===
On the July 5, 2007 edition of Impact!, Styles and Daniels briefly joined forces once again to participate in a three-way tag match against LAX and then-Tag Team Champions Team 3D, for both the tag team titles and a spot in the Victory Road 2007 "Match of Champions". The team lost, however. At the 2007 No Surrender event, they did work together throughout much of a 10-team tag team gauntlet match despite being on separate teams - Styles and his Christian Coalition tag team partner Tomko would end up winning that match, and their ensuing match against Team Pacman for the TNA World Tag Team Championship.

Styles and Daniels' next appearance together would be on the first weekly two-hour Impact! on October 4 with Triple X and Christian's Coalition teaming up in the 8-man tag team main event against LAX, Junior Fatu, and Samoa Joe. They would come up short when Triple X's Senshi was pinned after taking a Muscle Buster from Joe. In the months that followed, A.J. Styles and Tomko would join the Angle Alliance while Christopher Daniels was (kayfabe) fired from TNA (returning a month later as the masked face Curry Man), ending all chance of the two teaming up for the time being.

On the last Impact before the Lockdown 2009 pay-per-view (by which time the Curry Man persona had also been fired as well), Jeff Jarrett reinstated Daniels to join the team of Jarrett, Styles, and Samoa Joe against the Kurt Angle-led Main Event Mafia in the Lethal Lockdown match. Styles would pin Booker T at Lockdown after a shot from Jarrett's guitar, winning the match for their team. From there, Styles and Daniels would each become cornerstones of the TNA Front Line faction and would team together on occasion in resistance efforts against the Main Event Mafia, until A.J. won the TNA World Heavyweight Championship at No Surrender and Daniels eventually became a title contender along with Samoa Joe. As mistrust developed thanks to a mysterious assailant attacking Styles and Joe stirring the pot, the two would fall out once again, Daniels this time turning into the bitter villain. Tomko would soon be revealed as the attacker, and Styles would turn rogue himself thanks to the influence of Ric Flair, but the two had yet to team together again before Daniels was released from TNA in early April 2010.

Daniels returned to TNA on the March 31, 2011, edition of Impact! as a face, wanting to avenge A.J. Styles, after he was injured by Bully Ray. On the April 21 edition of Impact!, Daniels was officially named a member of Styles' stable, Fortune, who he'd worked alongside at Lockdown, and the duo would wrestle their first match back together on the May 5 edition of Impact!, where they defeated Bully Ray and Gunner. They teamed up again on the May 26th edition of Impact Wrestling, defeating Tommy Dreamer (who turned heel the previous week) and Bully Ray in a Street Fight.

Following A.J.'s victory over him at July 10's Destination X pay-per-view, Daniels would spend weeks asking Styles for a rematch. Styles finally granted Daniels his request on the September 1 edition of Impact Wrestling, where Daniels managed to pick up the win. After the match, Daniels refused to shake hands with Styles. On the September 22 edition of Impact Wrestling, Daniels refused to return the favor and give Styles a rematch while making arrogant remarks about being better than him similarly to the past two weeks, which eventually led to a brawl between the two. When the two were finally separated from each other by fellow Fortune member Kazarian, Daniels kicked Styles in the groin, completing his latest heel turn and ending the duo's latest alliance.

== Championships and accomplishments ==
- Pro Wrestling Illustrated
  - PWI Tag Team of the Year (2006)
- Total Nonstop Action Wrestling
  - NWA World Tag Team Championship (2 times)
  - Match of the Year (2006) vs. The Latin American Xchange (Homicide and Hernandez) in an Ultimate X match at No Surrender
  - Tag Team of the Year (2006)
