= Bound for Glory (2005) =

2005 Total Nonstop Action Wrestling pay-per-view event

- Promotional poster featuring (left to right) Raven, Monty Brown, Jeff Hardy, Jeff Jarrett, Rhino, A.J. Styles, and Abyss
- Promotion: Total Nonstop Action Wrestling
- Date: October 23, 2005
- City: Orlando, Florida
- Venue: TNA Impact! Zone (Universal Studios Florida)
- Attendance: 900
- Tagline: A Time for Greatness

Pay-per-view chronology
← Previous; Unbreakable	Next → Genesis

Bound for Glory chronology
← Previous; First	Next → 2006

The 2005 Bound for Glory was a professional wrestling pay-per-view (PPV) event produced by the Total Nonstop Action Wrestling (TNA) promotion that took place on October 23, 2005 at the TNA Impact! Zone in Orlando, Florida. It was the first event under the Bound for Glory name and tenth event in the 2005 TNA PPV schedule. The show was promoted as TNA's premiere PPV event and their equivalent to the rival World Wrestling Entertainment's (WWE) WrestleMania. Ten professional wrestling matches and one pre-show match were featured on the card, three of which involved championships.

The main event was for the NWA World Heavyweight Championship, in which champion Jeff Jarrett fought the challenger Rhino with Tito Ortiz as Special Guest Referee. The match was originally Jarrett versus Kevin Nash with Ortiz as referee, however Nash was not cleared to wrestle due to a medical emergency. A Ten-Man Gauntlet match was held to determine Nash's replacement, which Rhino won. Rhino then went on to defeat Jarrett to win the NWA World Heavyweight Championship at the show. The TNA X Division Championship was defended in a Thirty-Minute Iron Man match by champion A.J. Styles against the challenger Christopher Daniels at the event. Styles defeated Daniels one fall to zero falls to retain the championship. Monster's Ball II was held at Bound for Glory, in which Rhino defeated Abyss, Jeff Hardy, and Sabu. The NWA World Tag Team Championship was successfully defended by America's Most Wanted (Chris Harris and James Storm) against The Naturals (Andy Douglas and Chase Stevens) at the show. Chris Sabin, Matt Bentley, and Petey Williams competed in a Three Way Ultimate X match to determine the number-one contender to the TNA X Division Championship also on the card. Williams won the encounter to earn a future title match.

Bound for Glory is remembered for Nash being removed from the main event and for Rhino's impromptu championship victory. Rhino becoming champion was ranked by TNA as the 21st greatest moment in the company's history. The event was dedicated to Reggie Lisowski, who died the night prior. Bob Kapur of the professional wrestling section of the Canadian Online Explorer rated the show a 9 out of 10, higher than the 2006 edition. It also received a higher rating by the Canadian Online Explorer than WWE's WrestleMania 21 PPV event held on April 3, 2005, which had been given a 5 out of 10 by Dale Plummer and Nick Tylwalk.

== Production ==
=== Background ===
In March 2005, it was reported that TNA's then-September PPV event titled Bound for Glory was to be the promotion's equivalent to the rival World Wrestling Entertainment's WrestleMania. On June 19, 2005, at TNA's Slammiversary PPV event, TNA commentators Mike Tenay and Don West announced that the first Bound for Glory event would take place on October 23, 2005. A fanfest, similar to the one held at TNA's Victory Road PPV event, was also planned. The fanfest, promoted as Total Nonstop InterAction, was set for October 22 at the DoubleTree Hotel in Orlando, Florida. Several TNA wrestlers were scheduled to appear at the event, such as Raven, A.J. Styles, Jushin Liger, Christopher Daniels, Jeff Hardy, Jeff Jarrett, Chris Sabin, Monty Brown, Jimmy Hart, Lance Hoyt, Rhino, Abyss, Kip James, Shark Boy, Chris Harris, James Storm, B.G. James, Elix Skipper, Sonjay Dutt, Sonny Siaki, James Mitchell, Apolo, Bobby Roode, Eric Young, A-1, and Petey Williams of Team Canada, among others. On August 19, tickets went on sale for Bound for Glory. A promotional poster for the event was released prior by TNA on In Demand featuring the tagline "A Time for Greatness" as well as Raven, Brown, Hardy, Jarrett, Rhino, Styles, and Abyss. A thirty-minute pre-show was advertised to take place prior to the telecast. TNA promoted the debut of Japanese wrestler Liger for the event. Samoa Joe was later advertised as Liger's opponent. Hurricane Wilma's course was set toward Florida during the festivities weekend, but TNA did not expect it to interfere with the events. Bound for Glory was dedicated to Reggie Lisowski, also known as "The Crusher", who died the night before.

=== Storylines ===
Bound for Glory was scheduled to feature nine professional wrestling matches and one pre-show match, however, due to a medical emergency TNA was forced to change the main event of the show, resulting in ten overall matches. Each of these matches involved wrestlers from pre-existing scripted feuds and storylines portraying villains, heroes, or less distinguishable characters; these scripted events built tension and culminated in a wrestling match or series of matches.

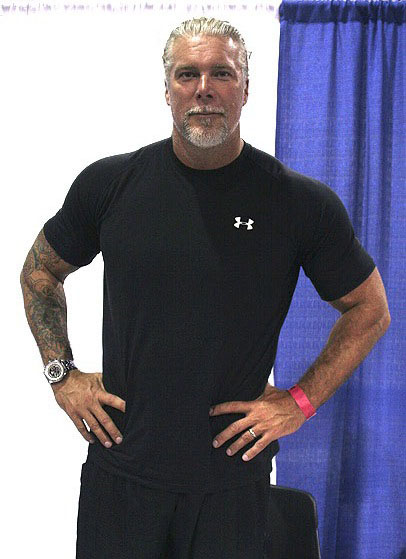
Kevin Nash (pictured) returned to TNA to challenge Jeff Jarrett for the NWA World Heavyweight Championship at Bound for Glory.

The main storyline heading into Bound for Glory revolved around the NWA World Heavyweight Championship. At TNA's previous PPV event Unbreakable on September 11, then-champion Raven retained the title in a Raven's Rules match against Rhino. On September 15, Jeff Jarrett defeated Raven with help from America's Most Wanted (Chris Harris and James Storm; AMW) and Scott D'Amore at a Border City Wrestling event to win the championship. On the October 1 episode of TNA's television program TNA Impact!, Jarrett announced a partnership with AMW and D'Amore before the 3Live Kru (Konnan, Ron Killings, and B.G. James) interrupted them. Team 3D (Brother Devon and Brother Ray) then made their TNA debut, followed by the TNA return of Kevin Nash, who challenged Jarrett to a title defense at Bound for Glory. Jarrett and Nash previously fought at TNA's Against All Odds PPV event on February 13, which Jarrett won to retain the NWA World Heavyweight Championship. On the October 8 episode of Impact!, NWA Championship Committee member Larry Zbyszko announced that the match between Nash and Jarrett was official and set for Bound for Glory with an added stipulation. Mixed martial arts fighter Tito Ortiz was then revealed as the Special Guest Referee for the bout. This was Ortiz's second time refereeing an NWA World Heavyweight Championship match in TNA, with his first being the NWA World Heavyweight Championship bout at TNA's Hard Justice PPV event on May 15.

At Unbreakable, the TNA X Division Championship was defended in a Three Way match by then-champion Christopher Daniels against A.J. Styles and Samoa Joe. Styles won the match and the title at the event. This led to TNA promoting a Thirty-Minute Iron Man match between Styles and Daniels for the title at Bound for Glory. This was a rematch between the two that took place at Against All Odds. Other events that lead to this match included the 2005 TNA Super X Cup Tournament, which caused the Three Way match at Unbreakable, and Daniels defeating Styles in an Ultimate X Challenge match at TNA's Destination X PPV event on March 13 to become champion. On the October 8 episode of Impact!, Daniels issued a challenge to Styles to pick three wrestlers on the roster and he would defeat all of them in fifteen minutes or less. Styles accepted the challenge and chose Shark Boy, Sonjay Dutt, and himself. Daniels defeated both Shark Boy and Dutt before the time-limit expired, but did not defeat Styles in time on the October 15 episode of Impact!.

There were several other matches promoted for the show. The most significant of these were a Four Way Monster's Ball match, a Three Way Ultimate X match, and an NWA World Tag Team Championship bout. The Monster's Ball match, promoted as Monster's Ball II, was announced in late-September. The participants advertised for the bout were Abyss, Rhino, Jeff Hardy, and Sabu. The only recent storylines connected to this bout included Abyss and Sabu being involved in a rivalry for an undisclosed reason, leading to a match at Unbreakable. Sabu had also been involved in a minor feud with Rhino, by teaming with Raven to face the team of Rhino and Jarrett in a match at TNA's Sacrifice PPV event on August 14. The Ultimate X match was announced at Unbreakable after a bout pitting Chris Sabin against Petey Williams. There, Matt Bentley returned to TNA and issued an Ultimate X open challenge to the pair to take place at Bound for Glory. TNA later scheduled the match, with the winner becoming number-one contender to the TNA X Division Championship. After this, the three promoted the encounter by interfering in each other's Impact! matches. On the April 29 episode of Impact!, The Naturals (Andy Douglas and Chase Stevens) defeated then-NWA World Tag Team Champions AMW to become the new champions. This led to a rematch at Hard Justice, where The Naturals retained the title. On the October 15 episode of Impact!, Zbyszko declared that The Naturals would defend the NWA World Tag Team Championship against AMW the following week. AMW reclaimed the championship from The Naturals on the October 22 episode of Impact!. Afterwards, TNA added a rematch between the two teams for the title to the Bound for Glory card.

== Event ==
=== Pre-show ===
Prior to Bound for Glory, TNA held a thirty-minute pre-show. During the broadcast, Mike Tenay announced that Kevin Nash had been hospitalized over the weekend and was not cleared to wrestle in the main event. Tenay stated that a replacement would be determined later in the night.

A X Division Four Way match between Sonjay Dutt, Alex Shelley, Austin Aries, and Roderick Strong was held during the pre-show. Dutt won the match at 12 minutes and 7 seconds after performing his signature Bombay-Rana aerial maneuver on Strong into a pin attempt.

A segment with Raven took place where he demanded to be placed in the main event for the NWA World Heavyweight Championship. Larry Zbyszko disagreed, resulting in Raven attacking him before security pulled Raven off. Rhino then came out and stated that he deserved the title shot more than Raven.

=== Miscellaneous ===
Bound for Glory featured employees other than the wrestlers involved in the matches. Mike Tenay and Don West were the commentators for the telecast. Jeremy Borash (for the main event only) and David Penzer were ring announcers for the event. Andrew Thomas, Rudy Charles, and Mark "Slick" Johnson participated as referees for the encounters. Shane Douglas handled the interview duties during the show. Besides employees who appeared in a wrestling role, Cassidy Riley, New Japan Pro-Wrestling (NJPW) president Simon Inoki, TNA president Dixie Carter, two Polynesian dancers, Scott D'Amore, Traci, James Mitchell, Gail Kim, and Team 3D (Brother Devon and Brother Ray) all appeared on camera, either in backstage or in ringside segments.

=== Preliminary matches ===
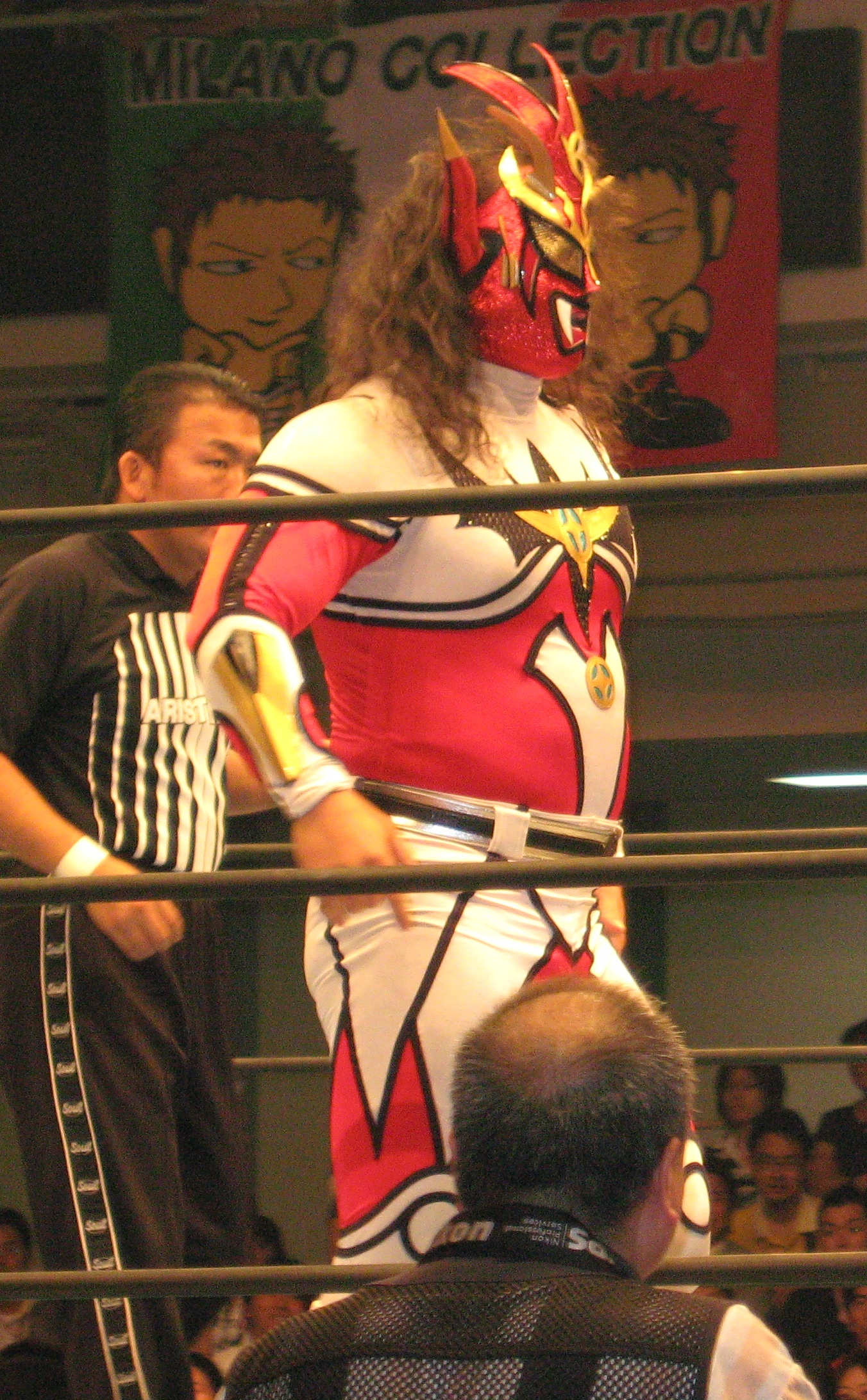
Jushin Liger (pictured) made his debut for the promotion at Bound for Glory against Samoa Joe.

The first bout was between Samoa Joe and Jushin Liger. It lasted 7 minutes and 27 seconds. Joe was accompanied by two Polynesian dancers during his entrance, who performed for the crowd. Liger gained a near-fall on Joe at 6 minutes. Afterwards, Joe slammed Liger in the mat back-first with his signature Muscle Buster maneuver. He then followed by applying his Coquina Clutch submission hold. As the referee waited for Liger to submit, he became limp, causing the referee to lift and drop Liger's arm three times, resulting in the knock-out victory for Joe.

The Diamonds in the Rough (Simon Diamond, David Young, and Elix Skipper) versus Apolo, Sonny Siaki, and Shark Boy in a Six Man Tag Team match followed. The duration of this contest was 7 minutes and 3 seconds. Young pinned Siaki to win the encounter for his team after forcing Siaki against the mat with a spinebuster.

Monty Brown was pitted against Lance Hoyt in the next encounter. Hoyt gained a two-count early on by landing on Brown with a moonsault aerial maneuver from the top rope. This followed with Brown slamming Hoyt against the mat with his signature Alpha Bomb maneuver for a near-fall. Brown won the contest at 6 minutes and 29 seconds after tackling Hoyt with his signature Pounce maneuver.

The fourth match was another Six Man Tag Team match, this time between Team Canada (Bobby Roode, Eric Young, and A-1) and the 3Live Kru (Konnan, Ron Killings, and B.G. James). Team Canada were accompanied by Scott D'Amore. At 6 minutes and 8 seconds, Young gained the pinfall victory for his team on James, after Roode hit James with a hockey stick while the referee was preoccupied.

The Three Way Ultimate X match was next to determine the number-one contender to the TNA X Division Championship at Genesis. Petey Williams, Chris Sabin, and Matt Bentley were the participants in this encounter, which spanned 13 minutes and 13 seconds. Bentley was accompanied by Traci to the ring. In an Ultimate X match, ropes are hung above the ring in a manner to form an "X", in which the objective is to climb the ropes and retrieve an object at the center of the "X". In this case, the object was a giant red "X". Sabin scaled the ropes above the ring midway through the match, before Bentley jumped up and tackled him to the mat below. The result of this impact caused the "X" to fall off the ropes. TNA officials then had to re-hang it while the match continued. Later, Bentley and Sabin attempted to retrieve the "X" again, only to cause it to fall once more. This time Williams was standing below and caught it; the referee declared Williams the winner, thus becoming the number-one contender to the TNA X Division Championship at Genesis.

The NWA World Tag Team Championship was defended by AMW, who were accompanied by Gail Kim, against The Naturals in the sixth bout on the card. The duration of the contest was 10 minutes and 37 seconds. Douglas' head was busted open during the match, causing him to bleed from the forehead throughout. The Naturals got a two-count on Harris after they performed AMW's signature Death Sentence maneuver on him by slamming him back-first into the mat while jumping on his throat. Kim interfered in the bout by distracting The Naturals, which allowed Storm to bash Douglas over the head and then handcuff him to the ring-barrier. AMW followed by performing the Death Sentence on Stevens and pinning him to remain champions.

=== Main event matches ===
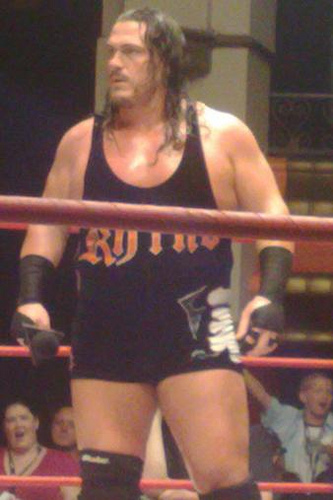
Rhino (pictured) won the NWA World Heavyweight Championship at Bound for Glory.

Monster's Ball II was held at Bound for Glory. Rhino, Abyss, Sabu, and Jeff Hardy all participated in the match. James Mitchell accompanied Abyss to the ring. In a Monster's Ball match, pinfalls and submissions count anywhere. There are no disqualifications or count-outs and weapons are supplied and welcomed. It is called Monster's Ball because in the storyline each wrestler has supposedly been locked in a dark room for the preceding 24 hours without food or water. In the very beginning, Sabu started bleeding from his right eye, while Hardy had blood coming out of a cut on his arm. Midway through the bout, Rhino also started to bleed. Hardy laid Abyss on a table and then ascended to the top of the Bound for Glory set. He then jumped off in a somersault and landed on Abyss. Eventually both Abyss and Hardy recovered, leading to Rhino tackling Abyss through a table with his signature Gore maneuver. Afterwards, Rhino drove Hardy's head into the mat with his signature Rhino Driver maneuver from the second ring rope and followed with a pin to win the match at 12 minutes and 20 seconds. After this match, Larry Zbyszko announced that a Ten-Man Gauntlet match would be held later in the show to determine who would face Jarrett for the NWA World Heavyweight Championship.

The TNA X Division Championship was defended by A.J. Styles against Christopher Daniels in a Thirty-Minute Iron Man match. In an Iron Man match, a time-limit is set for a particular amount, in this case thirty-minutes. The match will continue until time runs out and the competitor who gained the most falls when time runs out by pinfall, submission, count-out, or disqualification is the overall winner of the bout. Daniels attempted to get Styles to submit early in the bout by using his Koji Clutch submission hold. Later on, Daniels earned a two-count after landing on Styles with his signature B.M.E. aerial maneuver. Styles also gained a near-fall by holding Daniels on his shoulders before twisting him off and slamming him to the mat for what he calls a Rack Bomb. With only 13 seconds left in the match and the score still tied zero to zero, Styles performed his signature Styles Clash maneuver and followed with the pin. As time ran out, Styles had the most falls thus retaining the TNA X Division Championship.

TNA then held an impromptu Ten-Man Gauntlet match to determine Kevin Nash's replacement in the main event. This was the ninth match of the show with a duration of 14 minutes and 12 seconds. The participants for the match were Abyss, A.J. Styles, Jeff Hardy, Kip James, Lance Hoyt, Monty Brown, Rhino, Ron Killings, Sabu, and Samoa Joe. The rules for a Gauntlet match are as follows: two wrestlers start the match with another entering at 2-minute intervals. The objective of the match is to eliminate opponents by throwing them over the top rope and down to the floor. The last wrestler left in the ring is the winner of the contest. The last two wrestlers were Abyss and Rhino. Rhino won the match after lifting Abyss over the top rope and down to the floor.

The main event was for the NWA World Heavyweight Championship, in which then-champion Jeff Jarrett was pitted against Rhino with Tito Ortiz as Special Guest Referee. Jarrett was accompanied to the ring by Gail Kim. A casket was positioned by the ring, as in storyline Jarrett planned to bury his opponent after defeating them. During the match, Kim distracted Ortiz allowing Jarrett to bash Rhino over the head with a guitar for a two-count. AMW then came to ringside to distract Ortiz and slide Jarrett another guitar. As Jarrett attempted to hit Rhino with the guitar, Rhino countered by crashing into Jarrett with his Gore maneuver for the pinfall victory at 5 minutes and 30 seconds to become the new NWA World Heavyweight Champion. After the contest, AMW, Jarrett, and Team Canada attacked Rhino and placed him in the casket. Team 3D came to his defense, as well as the 3LiveKru. A brawl between all the wrestlers took place, with Eric Young of Team Canada ending up in the casket and Rhino standing on top of it holding the NWA World Heavyweight Championship belt as the event came to a close.

== Reception ==
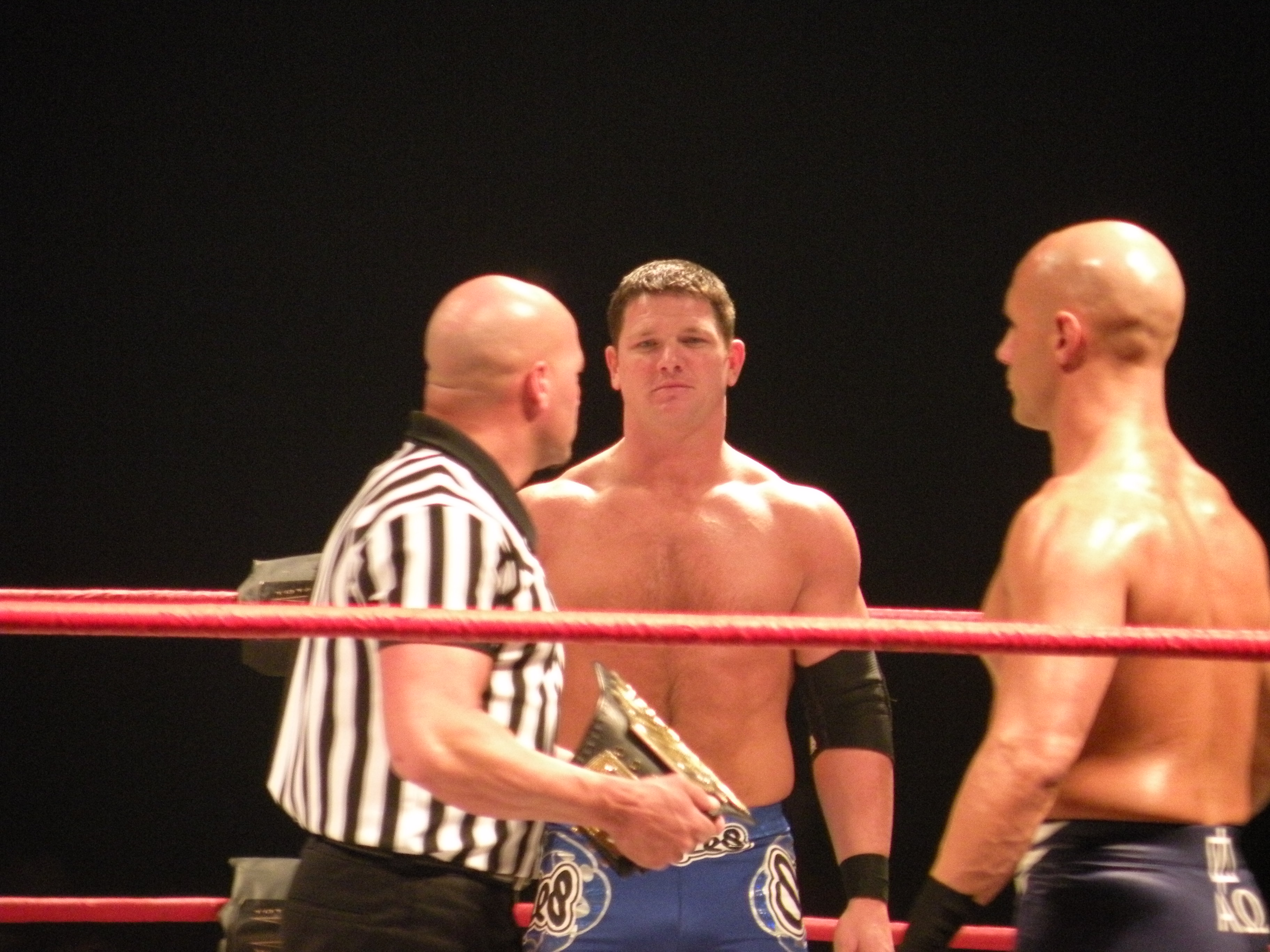
The Thirty-Minute Iron Man match between A.J. Styles (center) and Christopher Daniels (right) was given the highest rating of Bob Kapur's review, a 10 out of 10.

A total of 900 people attended Bound for Glory, while 800 people attended the fanfest. It was reported that tickets for the event sold very quickly. Canadian Online Explorer writer Bob Kapur rated the entire event a 9 out of 10, which was higher than the 2006 edition with a 7 out of 10 from Chris Sokol. Bound for Glory's ranking was higher than Unbreakable's rating, which received an 8 out of 10 by Corey David Lacroix. Bound for Glory also ranked higher than TNA's next event, Genesis, which also received an 8 out of 10 from Lacroix. Compared to rival World Wrestling Entertainment's (WWE) No Mercy and Taboo Tuesday PPV events, Bound for Glory out-performed both. No Mercy was given a 5 out of 10 while Taboo Tuesday received a 7 out of 10. Bound for Glory was also rated higher than WWE's WrestleMania 21, which took place on April 3, 2005. While Bound for Glory received a 9 out of 10, WrestleMania was only given a 5 out of 10 by Dale Plummer and Nick Tylwalk.

Kapur rated the main event an 8 out of 10, while he gave the Gauntlet match a 7 out of 10. The Iron Man match received a perfect 10 out of 10 from Kapur, his highest rating of the review. The Ultimate X match and Monster's Ball II were both given the same rating, a 9 out of 10. The NWA World Tag Team Championship match and Jushin Liger versus Samoa Joe were both given a 7 out of 10. The Diamonds in the Rough versus Apolo, Shark Boy, and Sonny Siaki was given the lowest rating of Kapur's review, a 5 out of 10.

Wade Keller of the Pro Wrestling Torch Newsletter reviewed the show. He felt that Rhino versus Jeff Jarrett was "not much of a main event, but it followed the old rule of having the replacement babyface wrestler in a main event always win so fans don't feel ripped off." As for the Iron Man match for the TNA X Division Championship between A.J. Styles and Christopher Daniels, Keller expressed that it was a "very good match" that had a "nice change of pattern with just one fall during the match, but ultimately the first two-thirds wasn't particularly exciting or engrossing enough to top their previous Iron Man match." He went on to say that Styles and Daniels "were great in the final minutes at conveying sheer exhaustion mixed with desire to win" and that they "had a tough act to follow with the stunt filled Monsters Ball." As for the Monster's Ball match, Keller said it was a "good one" but it was "tough to go to four stars for a match that includes so many huge spots and little long-term selling, but it's also hard not to rate it this high when there's a potential "big spot of the year" and a crowd chanting "That was awesome!" afterward." Meanwhile, Keller felt the World Tag Team Championship match was "average" and that it "just didn't feel like a major PPV title match." "Just a highspot fest with a lousy ending. The highspots were good, but it was far from a standout Ultimate X match. The "can't miss" match just missed based on not fulfilling high expectations," is what Keller had to say regarding the Ultimate X match. As for Jushin Liger versus Samoa Joe, Keller believed it was an "above average match of below average length," but that it was "disappointing they didn't go longer."

James Caldwell, also of the Pro Wrestling Torch Newsletter, reviewed the show. He felt differently from both Keller and Kapur, as he stated that Bound for Glory overall was a "bad PPV." He believed the main event was a "cluster," the Gauntlet match was "pointless," and the Monster's Ball match was the "same ole' carwreck match with no long-term selling and too many highspots that didn't mean much at the end of the day." He called the NWA World Tag Team Championship match "ridiculous" and the TNA X Division Champion number-one contender the "worst Ultimate X match in TNA history." He did, however, praise the Iron Man match stating it was "definitely the match of the night with some good wrestling holds and believable nearfalls." He also enjoyed the Liger versus Joe bout, say it was a "good start to the show even if it was shorter than expected."

TNA released a DVD counting down the top 50 moments in their history in 2007, with several moments from Bound for Glory making it on the list. Liger's debut was ranked at number 42, Jeff Hardy's jump from the entrance stage marked in at number 27, and Rhino winning the NWA World Heavyweight Championship was ranked at number 21 on the compilation.

== Aftermath ==
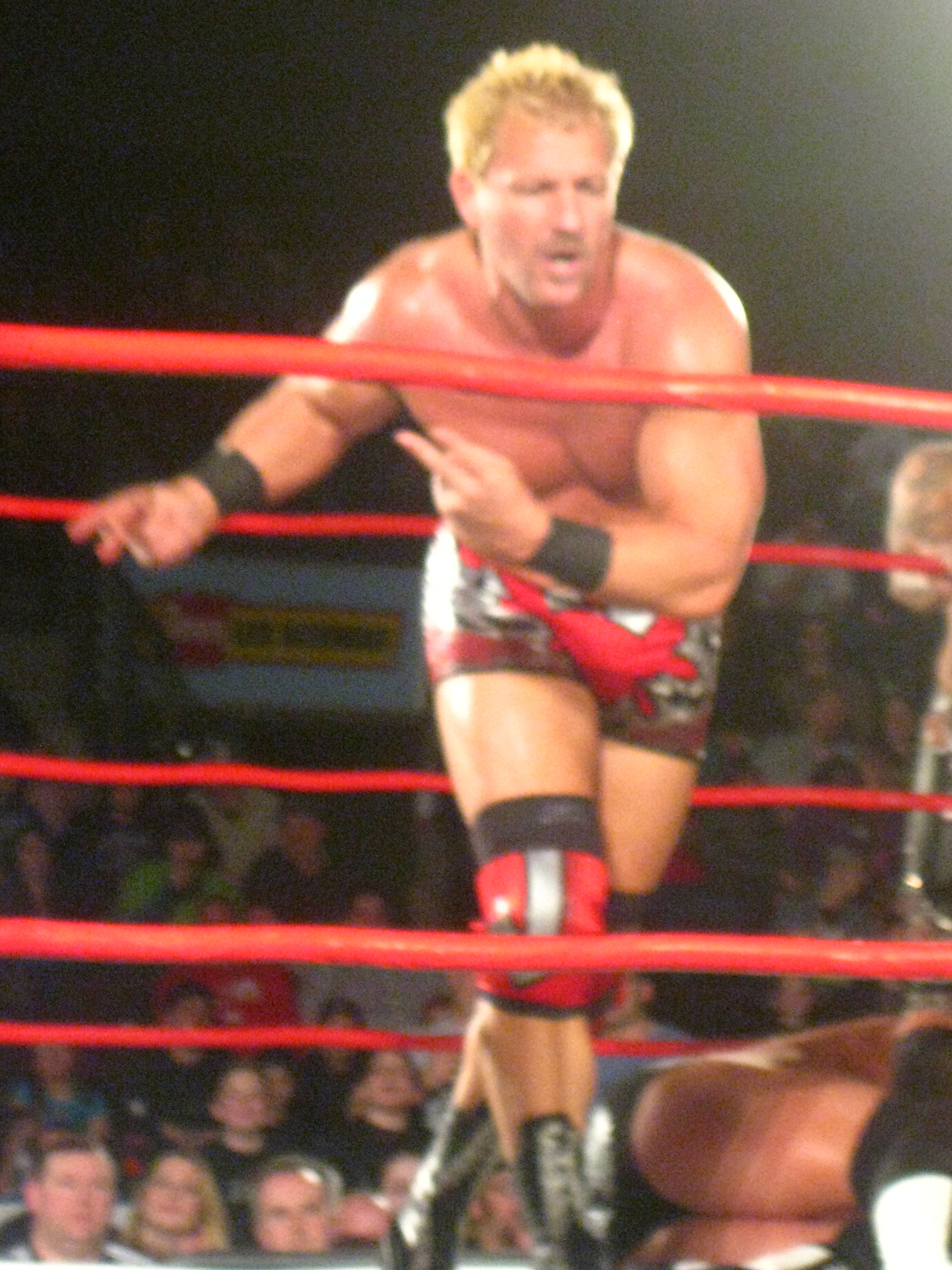
Jeff Jarrett (pictured) defeated Rhino to reclaim the NWA World Heavyweight Championship after Bound for Glory.

Kevin Nash was released from the hospital following Bound for Glory. Medical personnel stated he had what appeared to be a minor heart attack or was on the verge of having one when he called 9-1-1. The original plan was to have Nash and Raven start a rivalry after Bound for Glory, but due to the circumstances this was changed.

Jeff Jarrett announced on the October 29 episode of Impact! that a rematch between Rhino and he for the NWA World Heavyweight Championship was scheduled for the November 3 episode of Impact!. Jarrett defeated Rhino on the respective episode to reclaim the NWA World Heavyweight Championship. Prior to this, TNA began promotion of a Six Man Tag Team match at their Genesis PPV event on November 13 pitting Rhino and Team 3D (Brother Devon and Brother Ray) against Jarrett and America's Most Wanted (Chris Harris and James Storm). This was confirmed on the October 29 episode of Impact!. Rhino and Team 3D won the contest at Genesis. Following the contest, Christian Cage, who made his TNA debut earlier in the show, came to Rhino and Team 3D's defense while they were being assaulted by AMW and Jarrett.

TNA officials were unhappy with the turnout of the Ultimate X match at Bound for Glory, this was due to the technically difficulties involved. A rematch was announced on the October 29 episode of Impact!. It was held on the November 3 episode of Impact!, which Williams also won to remain number-one contender to the TNA X Division Championship. Williams versus Styles for the title was promoted for Genesis after this by TNA. Styles retained the championship at the event.

After Bound for Glory, Monty Brown and Jeff Hardy went on to compete in a match to determine the number-one contender to the NWA World Heavyweight Championship at Genesis. This was announced via TNA's official website after Bound for Glory. Brown won the bout at the event.

Abyss and Sabu continued their rivalry heading into Genesis, where they fought in a No Disqualification match. There, Abyss defeated Sabu to win the encounter.

Samoa Joe and Christopher Daniels went on to compete in a Four-on-Four Tag Team Elimination X match at Genesis. The match pitted the team of Alex Shelley, Daniels, Roderick Strong, and Joe against the team of Austin Aries, Sabin, Bentley, and Sonjay Dutt. The team of Shelley, Daniels, Strong, and Joe won the match. After the bout, Joe assaulted Daniels, thus injuring him in the storyline, which resulted in Daniels being sidelined indefinitely. Daniels returned at TNA's Turning Point PPV event on December 11 by attacking Joe.

== Results ==
No.	Results	Stipulations	Times
1^{P}	Sonjay Dutt defeated Alex Shelley, Austin Aries, and Roderick Strong	X Division Four-Way match	12:07
2	Samoa Joe defeated Jushin "Thunder" Liger	Singles match	7:27
3	The Diamonds in the Rough (David Young, Elix Skipper, and Simon Diamond) defeated Apolo, Shark Boy, and Sonny Siaki	Six-man tag team match	7:03
4	Monty Brown defeated Lance Hoyt	Singles match	6:29
5	Team Canada (A-1, Bobby Roode, and Eric Young) (with Scott D'Amore) defeated 3Live Kru (B.G. James, Konnan, and Ron Killings)	Six-man tag team match	6:08
6	Petey Williams defeated Chris Sabin and Matt Bentley (with Traci)	Ultimate X match to determine the #1 contender to the TNA X Division Championship at Genesis	13:13
7	America's Most Wanted (James Storm and Chris Harris) (with Gail Kim) (c) defeated The Naturals (Andy Douglas and Chase Stevens)	Tag team match for the NWA World Tag Team Championship	10:37
8	Rhino defeated Abyss (with James Mitchell), Jeff Hardy, and Sabu	Monster's Ball match	12:20
9	A.J. Styles (c) defeated Christopher Daniels (1-0)	30-minute Iron Man match for the TNA X Division Championship	30:00
10	Rhino won by last eliminating Abyss^{1}	Gauntlet for the Gold to replace Kevin Nash in the main event	14:12
11	Rhino defeated Jeff Jarrett (c) (with Gail Kim)	Singles match for the NWA World Heavyweight Championship with Tito Ortiz as Special Guest Referee	5:30
(c) / – the champion(s) heading into the match; P / – the match was broadcast on the pre-show

=== Iron Man match ===
Score		Point winner	Decision	Notes	Time
Styles	Daniels	Point winner	Decision	Notes	Time
1	0	A.J. Styles	Pinfall	Styles pinned Daniels after the Styles Clash	29:58

=== Gauntlet for the Gold ===
1.

Entrance No.	Wrestler	Elimination No.	Eliminator
1	Samoa Joe	8	Abyss
2	Ron Killings	6	A.J. Styles
3	Sabu	4	Rhino
4	Lance Hoyt	3	Rhino
5	Abyss	9	Rhino
6	Jeff Hardy	1	Monty Brown
7	Monty Brown	2	Himself
8	Rhino	Winner	N/A
9	Kip James	5	Abyss
10	A.J. Styles	7	Abyss
