= Victory Road (2006) =

2006 Total Nonstop Action Wrestling pay-per-view event

- DVD cover featuring Sting, Christian Cage, Scott Steiner and Samoa Joe
- Promotion: Total Nonstop Action Wrestling
- Date: July 16, 2006
- City: Orlando, Florida
- Venue: Impact Zone
- Attendance: 900

Pay-per-view chronology
← Previous; Slammiversary	Next → Hard Justice

Victory Road chronology
← Previous; 2004	Next → 2007

The 2006 Victory Road was a professional wrestling pay-per-view (PPV) event produced by Total Nonstop Action Wrestling (TNA), which took place on July 16, 2006 at the Impact Zone in Orlando, Florida. It was the second event under the Victory Road. Nine matches were featured on the event's card.

In October 2017, with the launch of the Global Wrestling Network, the event became available to stream on demand.

== Storylines ==
Victory Road featured ten professional wrestling matches and two pre-show matches that involved different wrestlers from pre-existing scripted feuds and storylines. Wrestlers portrayed villains, heroes, or less distinguishable characters in the scripted events that built tension and culminated in a wrestling match or series of matches.

== Results ==
No.	Results	Stipulations	Times
1^{D}	Johnny Devine (with Alex Shelley) defeated Shark Boy	Singles match	3:30
2	The Naturals (Chase Stevens and Andy Douglas) (with Shane Douglas) defeated The Diamonds in the Rough (Elix Skipper and David Young) (with Simon Diamond)	Tag team match	5:27
3	Monty Brown vs. Rhino ended in a no contest	Singles match	4:56
4	The Latin American Xchange (Homicide and Hernandez) (with Konnan) defeated Sonjay Dutt and Ron Killings	Tag team match	10:07
5	Senshi (c) defeated Kazarian	Singles match for the TNA X Division Championship	11:19
6	Raven defeated Larry Zbyszko	Hair vs. Hair match	3:48
7	Chris Sabin and Jay Lethal defeated The Paparazzi (Kevin Nash and Alex Shelley) (with Johnny Devine)	X Division Tag team match	9:07
8	The James Gang (B.G. James and Kip James) and Abyss (with Father James Mitchell) defeated Team 3D (Brother Ray, Brother Devon and Brother Runt)	Six-man tag team match	10:24
9	Sirelda, A.J. Styles and Christopher Daniels (c) defeated Gail Kim and America's Most Wanted (Chris Harris and James Storm)	Mixed tag team match for the NWA World Tag Team Championship	11:52
10	Sting defeated Christian Cage, Samoa Joe and Scott Steiner	Road to Victory match to determine the #1 contender to the NWA World Heavyweight Championship at Hard Justice	14:09
(c) / – the champion(s) heading into the match; D / – this was a dark match
