= Hardcore Justice (2015) =

2015 Total Nonstop Action Wrestling pay-per-view event

- Promotion: Total Nonstop Action Wrestling
- Date: March 16, 2015 (aired May 1, 2015)
- City: Orlando, Florida
- Venue: Impact Zone
- Attendance: 600
- Tagline: "It's not always about winning - it's about surviving"

Hardcore Justice chronology
← Previous; 2014	Next → 2021

Impact Wrestling special episodes chronology
← Previous; TKO: A Night of Knockouts	Next → May Mayhem

The 2015 Hardcore Justice (also known as Impact Wrestling: Hardcore Justice) was a professional wrestling event produced by Total Nonstop Action Wrestling (TNA). It was taped on March 16, 2015, and aired on a tape delay on May 1, 2015. It is the eleventh event under the Hardcore Justice chronology. Similar to the previous year's event, it was not held on pay-per-view (PPV), but was featured as a special edition of TNA's weekly broadcast of Impact Wrestling.

Five professional wrestling matches were contested at the event. The main event was a stretcher match between Kurt Angle and Eric Young, which Young won. On the undercard, Drew Galloway defeated Low Ki in a Pipe on a Pole match, Taryn Terrell retained the Knockouts Championship against Brooke, while Kenny King won the X Division Championship by defeating defending champion Rockstar Spud, Tigre Uno and Mandrews in a four-way ladder match and The Hardys (Matt Hardy and Jeff Hardy) and Davey Richards defeated The Revolution (Abyss, Manik and Khoya) in a street fight.

== Event ==
=== Preliminary matches ===
The event kicked off with a street fight pitting The Hardys (Matt Hardy and Jeff Hardy) and Davey Richards against The Revolution (Abyss, Manik and Khoya). Abyss crotched himself on a chair, allowing Jeff to nail him with a Twist of Fate and a Swanton Bomb for the win.

After the match, Mr. Anderson confronted Ethan Carter III and Tyrus and challenged EC3 to a match on the May 8 episode of Impact Wrestling with the match stipulation be voted by the fans.

Next, Rockstar Spud defended the X Division Championship against Kenny King, Tigre Uno and Mandrews in a four-way ladder match. Homicide interfered in the match as King was trying to retrieve the belt by climbing the ladder but Spud bit King's hand and Homicide broke it and threw Spud down, allowing King to retrieve the belt and win the X Division Championship.

Later, Taryn Terrell defended the Knockouts Championship against Brooke. The Dollhouse pulled Terrell out of the ring as Brooke attempted to hit a Butterface Maker and then Brooke delivered a plancha to Jade and Marti Bell. Brooke then returned to the ring where Bell distracted her, allowing Jade to push her off the top rope and Terrell nailed a Taryn Cutter to Brooke for the win to retain the title.

The penultimate match was a Pipe on a Pole match between Drew Galloway and Low Ki. Galloway avoided a Warrior's Way by Ki and hit him with a pipe and then hit a Future Shock to Ki for the win. A brawl occurred between The Beat Down Clan and The Rising.

=== Main event match ===
The main event was a stretcher match between Kurt Angle and Eric Young. Young attempted to nail a piledriver on Angle but Angle countered that into an ankle lock and Young tossed him into the turnbuckle and hit two piledrivers and then strapped him to the stretcher for the win.

== Results ==
No.	Results	Stipulations	Times
1	The Hardys (Matt Hardy and Jeff Hardy) and Davey Richards defeated The Revolution (Abyss, Manik and Khoya)	Street Fight	10:05
2	Kenny King defeated Rockstar Spud (c), Tigre Uno and Mandrews	Ladder match for the TNA X Division Championship	08:00
3	Taryn Terrell (c) (with Jade and Marti Bell) defeated Brooke	Singles match for the TNA Knockouts Championship	06:15
4	Drew Galloway defeated Low Ki	Pipe on a Pole match	07:30
5	Eric Young defeated Kurt Angle	Stretcher match	13:10
(c) / – the champion(s) heading into the match
