= TNA Unbreakable (2005) =

2005 Total Nonstop Action Wrestling pay-per-view event

Unbreakable (2005)
- Promotional poster featuring Rhino and Raven
- Promotion: Total Nonstop Action Wrestling (TNA)
- Date: September 11, 2005
- City: Orlando, Florida
- Venue: TNA Impact! Zone
- Attendance: 775

Pay-per-view chronology
← Previous; Sacrifice	Next → Bound for Glory

Unbreakable chronology
← Previous; First	Next → 2019

The 2005 Unbreakable was a professional wrestling pay-per-view (PPV) event produced by the Total Nonstop Action Wrestling (TNA) promotion that took place on September 11, 2005 at the TNA Impact! Zone in Orlando, Florida. It was the first under the Unbreakable name, the second was Unbreakable 2019. It was also the ninth event in the 2005 TNA PPV schedule. Nine professional wrestling matches and two pre-show matches were featured on the card, three of which were for championships.

The main event at Unbreakable was a three-way match for the TNA X Division Championship, in which then-champion Christopher Daniels defended the title against the challengers A.J. Styles and Samoa Joe. Styles ended up gaining the pinfall in the bout, thus winning the title. The NWA World Heavyweight Championship was defended in a Raven's Rules match between then-champion Raven and the challenger Rhino. Raven pinned Rhino in the encounter to retain the championship. A Four Way Elimination Tag Team match for the NWA World Tag Team Championship was held at Unbreakable, in which then-champions The Naturals (Andy Douglas and Chase Stevens) defeated the teams of Alex Shelley and Johnny Candido, America's Most Wanted (Chris Harris and James Storm), and Team Canada (A-1 and Eric Young) to remain champions. On the undercard, Abyss defeated Sabu in a No Disqualification match during the show.

Unbreakable is chiefly remembered for the three-way match for the TNA X Division Championship, which received a rare, at the time, five-star rating from wrestling journalist Dave Meltzer, the first and the only such rating that the company received until 2023. The main event was ranked by TNA as the fourth greatest moment in the company's history. The match was also the first (and to-date only) time a TNA X-Division Championship match has been the main-event of a TNA PPV. Corey David Lacroix of the professional wrestling section of the Canadian Online Explorer rated the show an 8 out of 10, stating "TNA's Unbreakable PPV was an astounding buffet of action, catering to the variety of tastes among professional wrestling fans."

== Production ==
=== Background ===
Unbreakable was announced in June 2005 to take place on September 11, 2005. TNA scheduled Unbreakable to be held at the TNA Impact! Zone in Orlando, Florida. TNA released a poster to promote the event featuring Raven and Rhino. A thirty-minute pre-show was slatted to take place prior to the telecast. Unbreakable was dedicated to the "unbreakable spirit of the American people."

=== Storylines ===
Unbreakable featured nine professional wrestling matches and two pre-show matches that involved different wrestlers from pre-existing scripted feuds and storylines. Wrestlers portrayed villains, heroes, or less distinguishable characters in the scripted events that built tension and culminated in a wrestling match or series of matches.

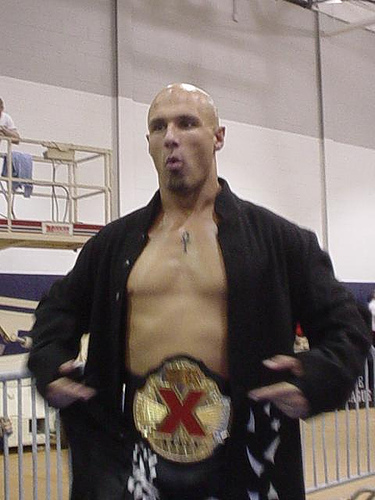
Christopher Daniels (pictured) defended the TNA X Division Championship against A.J. Styles and Samoa Joe in a three-way match at Unbreakable.

The main event was a three-way match for the TNA X Division Championship, in which then-champion Christopher Daniels defended the title against the challengers A.J. Styles and Samoa Joe. Prior to Unbreakable, TNA held the 2005 TNA Super X Cup Tournament to determine the number-one contender to the TNA X Division Championship. The tournament involved eight men, with Joe and Styles making it to the final round at TNA's previous PPV event Sacrifice on August 14. There, Joe defeated Styles after interference from Daniels to earn a shot at the title. On the August 19 episode of TNA's television program TNA Impact!, TNA commentator Mike Tenay announced that Daniels would defend the title against Joe at the event. Later during the same episode, Daniels assaulted Joe until Styles came out to attack Daniels over his interference in the bout at Sacrifice. Due to Styles' actions, Daniels demanded that NWA Championship Committee member Larry Zbyszko suspend Styles. Instead, Zbyszko added Styles to the encounter on the August 26 episode of Impact!, making it a three-way match for the TNA X Division Championship at the event. This match was also promoted as the X Division "Dream Bout", as the top competitors in the division were being pitted against each other for the championship.

The predominant bout on the card was for the NWA World Heavyweight Championship between then-champion Raven and the challenger Rhino. At Sacrifice, Raven teamed with Sabu to face the team of Jeff Jarrett and Rhino. On the pre-show of the gathering, Zbyszko announced if Jarrett pinned Raven during the contest then he would earn a future NWA World Heavyweight Championship match. However, he added that if Raven pinned Jarrett during the contest then Jarrett would not have another title match for an entire year. Rhino ended up pinning Raven at the event, with TNA declaring him number-one contender on their website after the show. Tenay promoted Raven versus Rhino for the NWA World Heavyweight Championship at Unbreakable on the August 19 episode of Impact!.

The NWA World Tag Team Championship was defended at Unbreakable in a Four Way Elimination Tag Team match by then-champions The Naturals (Andy Douglas and Chase Stevens), who were pitted against the teams of Alex Shelley and Sean Waltman, America's Most Wanted (Chris Harris and James Storm; AMW), and A-1 and Eric Young of Team Canada. This match was the combination of several storylines. The Naturals were involved in an on-screen rivalry heading into Unbreakable with A-1, Bobby Roode, Petey Williams, and Young—collectively known as Team Canada. At TNA's Slammiversary PPV event on June 19, The Naturals defeated Williams and Young to retain the World Tag Team Championship. The Naturals then teamed with Lance Hoyt in a Six Man Tag Team match to face A-1, Roode, and Young in a losing effort at TNA's No Surrender PPV event on July 17. Afterwards, The Naturals began an alliance with AMW leading to an Eight Man Tag Team match against A-1, Roode, Williams, and Young at Sacrifice. Team Canada were the victors at the show. On the August 19 episode of Impact!, The Naturals defeated A-1 and Young by disqualification to retain the World Tag Team Championship. Following the bout, Team Canada assaulted The Naturals until AMW came to their aid, which resulted in a brawl between the two teams with The Naturals feeling they did not need AMW's help. Concurrently at this time TNA held the Chris Candido Memorial Tag Team Tournament, which involved eight randomly assigned teams. Zbyszko announced on the August 26 episode of Impact! that a Four Way Elimination Tag Team match for the NWA World Tag Team Championship was planned for Unbreakable, in which The Naturals would defend against AMW, Team Canada, and the winners of the tournament. The final round of the Tournament was held on the September 9 episode of Impact!, where the team of Shelley and Waltman defeated the team of Chris Sabin and Shocker to join the match.

== Event ==
Other on-screen personnel
Role:	Name:
Commentator	Mike Tenay
Commentator	Don West
Ring announcer	Jeremy Borash
Referee	Rudy Charles
Referee	Mark "Slick" Johnson
Referee	Andrew Thomas
Interviewers	Jeremy Borash
Interviewers	Shane Douglas

=== Pre-Show ===
Prior to Unbreakable, TNA held a thirty-minute pre-show. During the broadcast, TNA interviewer Shane Douglas announced the NWA World Heavyweight Championship match between Raven and Rhino was changed to a Raven's Rules match. Two bouts were held during the telecast, the first pitted Cassidy Riley against Jerrelle Clark. The encounter went to a no contest at 1 minute and 56 seconds when Monty Brown interfered in the bout attacking both wrestlers and proceeding to challenge the winner of Raven versus Rhino for the NWA World Heavyweight Championship to a title defense at TNA's next PPV event Bound for Glory on October 23. Shark Boy fought Mikey Batts in the second, winning the contest at 3 minutes and 20 seconds by pinfall after forcing Batts chin into his shoulder with his signature Dead Sea Drop.

=== Miscellaneous ===
Unbreakable featured employees other than the wrestlers involved in the matches. Mike Tenay and Don West were the commentators for the telecast. Jeremy Borash (for the main event only) and David Penzer were ring announcers for the event. Andrew Thomas, Rudy Charles, and Mark "Slick" Johnson participated as referees for the encounters. Shane Douglas handled the interview duties during the show. Besides employees who appeared in a wrestling role, Traci Brooks, Sonny Siaki, Matt Bentley, Jeff Jarrett, James Mitchell, and Jimmy Hart all appeared on camera, either in backstage or in ringside segments.

=== Preliminary matches ===
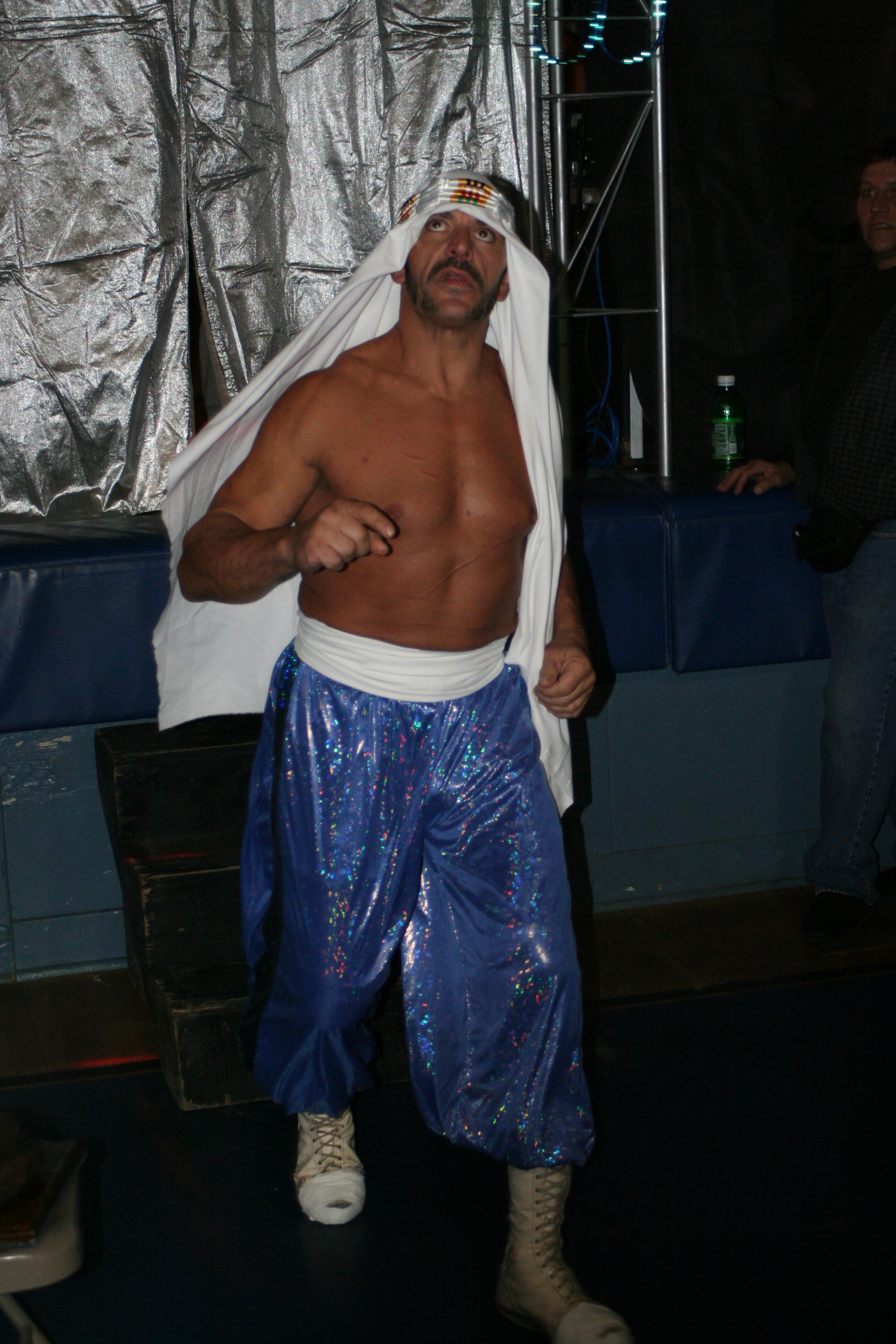
Sabu (pictured) fought Abyss in a No Disqualification match at Unbreakable.

The gathering began with a Six Man Tag Team match between the 3Live Kru (B.G. James, Konnan, and Ron Killings) and The Diamonds in the Rough (David Young, Elix Skipper, and Simon Diamond). The duration of the bout was 4 minutes and 20 seconds. Konnan used his shoe as a weapon during the encounter. 3Live Kru won the match by pinfall after Konnan slammed Young face-first into the mat with his signature Facejam maneuver.

The second bout of the show was between two non-contracted wrestlers, Austin Aries and Roderick Strong. It lasted 8 minutes even. Aries gained the pinfall after slamming Strong head-first into the mat with a brainbuster, followed by a 450° aerial splash onto a prone Strong.

Sonny Siaki accompanied the team of Apolo and Lance Hoyt for their match with Kip James and Monty Brown next. Kip attempted to kick Apolo with a charging big boot, but accidentally hit Brown. This allowed Apolo to kick Kip in the face and cover for a near-fall. Brown then gained the win for his team after crashing into Apolo with his signature Pounce maneuver at 9 minutes and 58 seconds.

The following contest pitted Chris Sabin against Petey Williams, lasting 12 minutes and 34 seconds. The bout was originally scheduled as Sabin facing his tag team partner in the Chris Candido Memorial Tag Team Tournament, Shocker. However, Shocker was unable to attend the show and was replaced by Williams. Williams held Sabin by Sabin's legs in a Sharpshooter submission hold twice during the match, with Sabin forcing Williams to release the hold both times. Near the end, Williams went to perform his signature Canadian Destroyer maneuver on Sabin, before Sabin countered the move into his signature Cradle Shock maneuver. After lifting up and slamming Williams back and neck-first into the mat, Sabin followed with the pinfall to win the encounter. Matt Bentley—formally known as Michael Shane—returned to TNA by attacking Sabin and Williams after the bout. Bentley then announced an Ultimate X open challenge to take place at Bound for Glory.

TNA held a No Disqualification match between Abyss, who was accompanied by James Mitchell, and Sabu next. Its duration was 11 minutes and 30 seconds. This was originally promoted as Abyss versus Sabu, however, a No Disqualification stipulation was added during the event. In a No Disqualification match, weapons are legal, as well as outside interference, with a victor determined only by pinfall or submission. In the final minutes, Abyss retrieved a bag of thumbtacks which were hidden under the ring. He then poured the contents onto the ring mat before slamming Sabu back-first into the tacks with his signature Black Hole Slam maneuver.

Bobby Roode faced Jeff Hardy in the sixth encounter. Roode's fellow Team Canada member Petey Williams interfered in the contest distracting the referee, allowing Roode to attempt to hit Hardy with the a hockey stick. Hardy dodged the swing and countered with his signature Twist of Fate maneuver, forcing Roode's chin into his shoulder. Afterwards, Hardy jumped off the top of a padded turnbuckle onto both Williams and Roode at ringside. Later, Roode re-entered the ring with Hardy remaining at ringside, allowing Jeff Jarrett to attack Hardy from behind with a hockey stick. Jarrett then pushed Hardy into the ring with Roode covering for the pinfall victory at 9 minutes and 7 seconds.

=== Main event matches ===
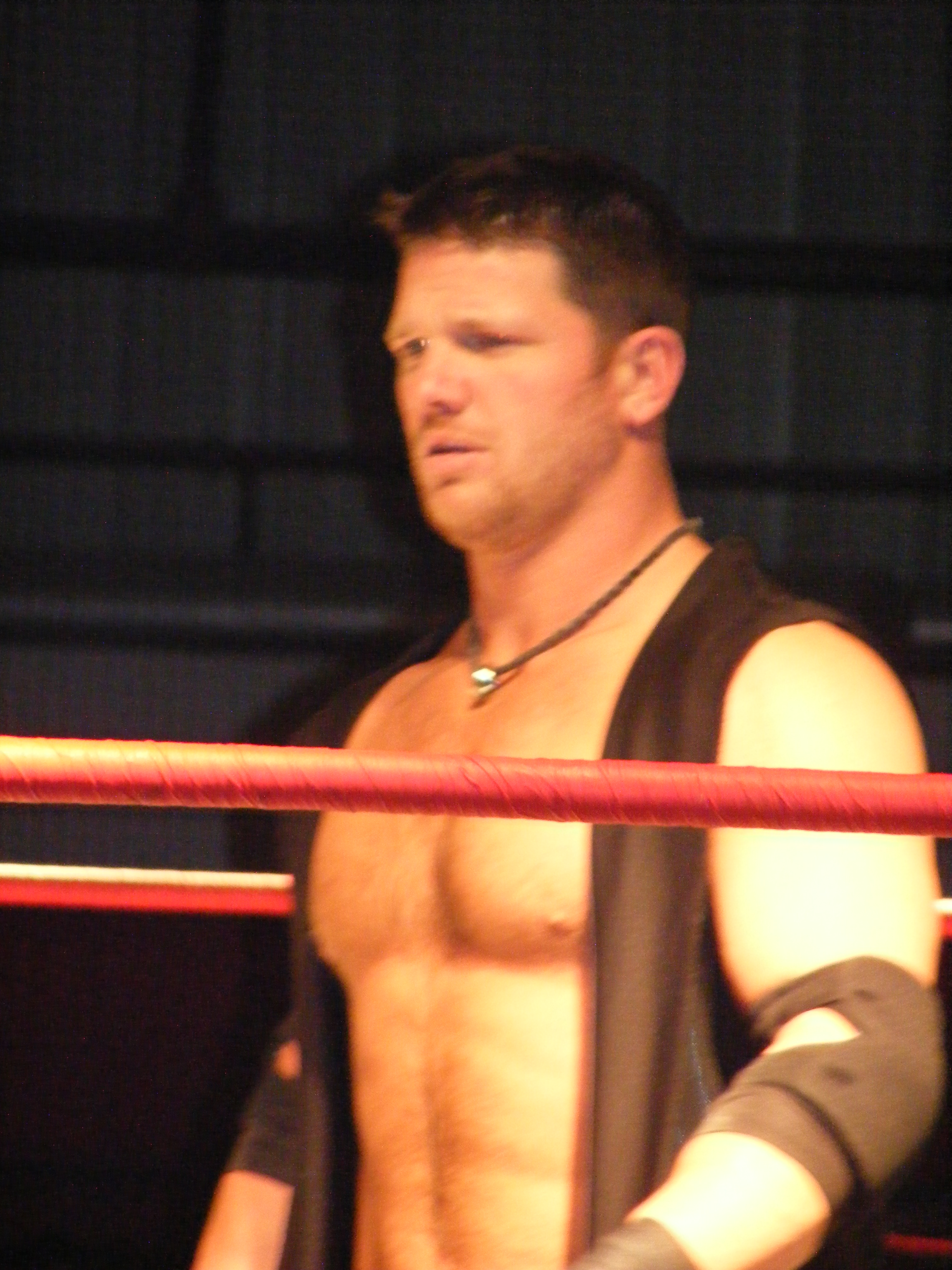
A.J. Styles (pictured) defeated Christopher Daniels and Samoa Joe in a three-way match to win the TNA X Division Championship at Unbreakable.

The Four-Way Elimination Tag Team match for the NWA World Tag Team Championship was next, in which The Naturals (Andy Douglas and Chase Stevens), who were accompanied by Jimmy Hart, defended against the teams of Alex Shelley and Sean Waltman, America's Most Wanted (Chris Harris and James Storm), and Team Canada (A-1 and Eric Young). The bout duration was 18 minutes and 1 second. Waltman was advertised to team with Shelley for the encounter, but missed the show due to undisclosed reasons. In this bout, if a member of a team is pinned or made to submit, then him and his partner is eliminated from the contest; the objective is to be the last team standing. Shelley began the bout alone, until Chris Candido's legitimate brother Johnny Candido, who was in attendance along with several of Candido's family members, jumped the railing to join Shelley as his tag team partner. A bit later, Douglas kicked Candido in the crotch and pinned him with a roll-up pin, thus eliminating Shelley and Candido from the contest. AMW were the next eliminated; Young pinned Harris with a roll-up after A-1 hit Harris across the back with a hockey stick. The Naturals pinned A-1 after slamming him into the mat face-first with their signature tag team Natural Disaster maneuver. Due to the pin, Team Canada were eliminated from the contest, thus giving the victory to The Naturals who retained the NWA World Tag Team Championship.

The NWA World Heavyweight Championship was defended in a Raven's Rules match by Raven against Rhino in the eighth encounter on the card. A contest conducted under Raven's Rules means there are no count-outs or no disqualifications, and weapons are provided for the environment; the only way to win is by pinfall or submission. Raven used a pizza cutter early on in the bout to cut open Rhino's forehead, causing him to bleed heavily. Later, Raven's forehead was also cut open due to being hit by a trashcan. Rhino used a staple gun during the contest; Rhino placed several staples in Raven's forehead. Cassidy Riley, Jeff Hardy, and Jeff Jarrett interfered in the bout. Riley interfered by accidentally distracting the referee during a pin attempt by Raven, whom Riley was attempting to aid. Jarrett came down to the ring near the end trying to bash Raven in the face with the NWA World Heavyweight Championship belt, but was stopped by Hardy. Raven then performed his signature Raven Effect DDT maneuver on Jarrett, forcing his head into the ring mat. Afterwards, Raven performed the Raven Effect DDT on Rhino and covered for the pinfall victory to retain the NWA World Heavyweight Championship at 14 minutes and 28 seconds.

The main event was a three-way match for what ring announcer Jeremy Borash described as the "TNA X Division Championship of the World", in which then-champion Christopher Daniels defended against the challengers A.J. Styles and Samoa Joe. Its duration was 22 minutes and 50 seconds. The match began with Joe and Styles double teaming Daniels, with the two engaging in a kicking competition against Daniels' back to see who could kick the hardest. While Daniels and Joe stood at ringside, Styles used the ropes to slingshot himself up into the air where he performed a backflip onto both competitors in what Styles' named the Shooting Styles Press. Later back in the ring, Daniels grabbed Styles and fell backwards in the process causing Styles to flip overhead towards Joe. Styles landed on Joe's shoulders and quickly fell backwards, flipping Joe forward. A few minutes later, Joe held Daniels in his signature Coquina Clutch submission hold, which was broken when Styles ascended a padded turnbuckle and jumped off to perform his signature Spiral Tap aerial technique, landing onto Daniels and Joe. Afterwards, Styles and Daniels fought on the top of a turnbuckle, with Joe ascending as well in order to lift up both and throw them off in a suplex. Joe followed by performing his signature Muscle Buster maneuver on Styles, forcing him back and neck-first into the mat. Daniels then attempted to hit Joe with the TNA X Division Title belt, which Joe countered into a powerslam. Daniels then followed by kicking the belt into the side of Joe's head. Styles eventually gained the pinfall on Daniels after countering Daniels' signature Angel's Wings maneuver into a bridging pin to win the TNA X Division Championship.

== Reception ==
A total of 775 people attended Unbreakable. Canadian Online Explorer writer Corey David Lacroix rated the entire event an 8 out of 10. TNA's previous event Sacrifice did not receive a rating, however, No Surrender, which took place prior to Sacrifice, was given an 8 out of 10 by Jason Clevett. Unbreakable was ranked lower than TNA's next event, Bound for Glory, which received a 9 out of 10 from Bob Kapur. Compared to rival World Wrestling Entertainment (WWE)'s Unforgiven PPV event held on September 18, Unbreakable was rated higher, as Chris Sokol gave Unforgiven a 6 out of 10.

Lacroix felt that with Unbreakable TNA "truly cemented the formula needed for delivering great pay per views." He concluded with "TNA's Unbreakable PPV was an astounding buffet of action, catering to the variety of tastes among professional wrestling fans." Lacroix also commented "If you missed it, get the replay. Don't think, just do it – – the main event is well worth the price." The main event was given Lacroix's highest match rating of 10 out of 10 in his review. He gave his lowest rating of 4 out of 10 to the opening Six Man Tag Team match. The NWA World Heavyweight Championship bout was ranked with a 7.5 out of 10, while a 7 out of 10 was given to the NWA World Tag Team Championship contest. Commenting on the main event, Lacroix spoke of it as a "certified match of the year candidate." Going onto describe in detail: "Unbreakable came to a close with mind-boggling main event, featuring a three-way dance between Samoa Joe against AJ Styles against X Division champion Christopher Daniels for the championship title. Now, this is the part where I go into a detail review of the match, but I'm not going to that. Fact is there is no review that could do justice in describing just how stellar this bout was." Regarding the Four Way Elimination match, Lacroix believed Johnny Candido's participation was "a nice gesture", but wonder "if they could have come up with something else, preferably outside of the match."

James Caldwell of the Pro Wrestling Torch published a review of the show. In his review he stated that the main event was an "amazing, special match", which he felt was "pro wrestling at its finest in 2005." As for the Raven's Rules match, Caldwell thought it was a "brutal hardcore match", which was a "good adrenaline rush but nothing separated the match from previous TNA hardcore matches." Regarding the NWA World Tag Team Championship bout, Caldwell say it was a "decent tag match that could have been much better if Waltman and Shelley were around at the end where the formula could have been changed up."

Wrestling journalist Dave Meltzer bestowed a rare 5 Star match rating to the three-way match for the TNA X Division Championship main event between A.J. Styles, Christopher Daniels, and Samoa Joe. TNA released a DVD counting down the top 50 moments in their history in 2007, with the three-way match for the TNA X Division Championship ranked at number 4. In 2021, the promotion ranked the Styles vs. Daniels vs. Joe match as the Nº1 of the Top 10 X-Division Title Matches. Will Ospreay ranked it as his favourite TNA match.

== Aftermath ==
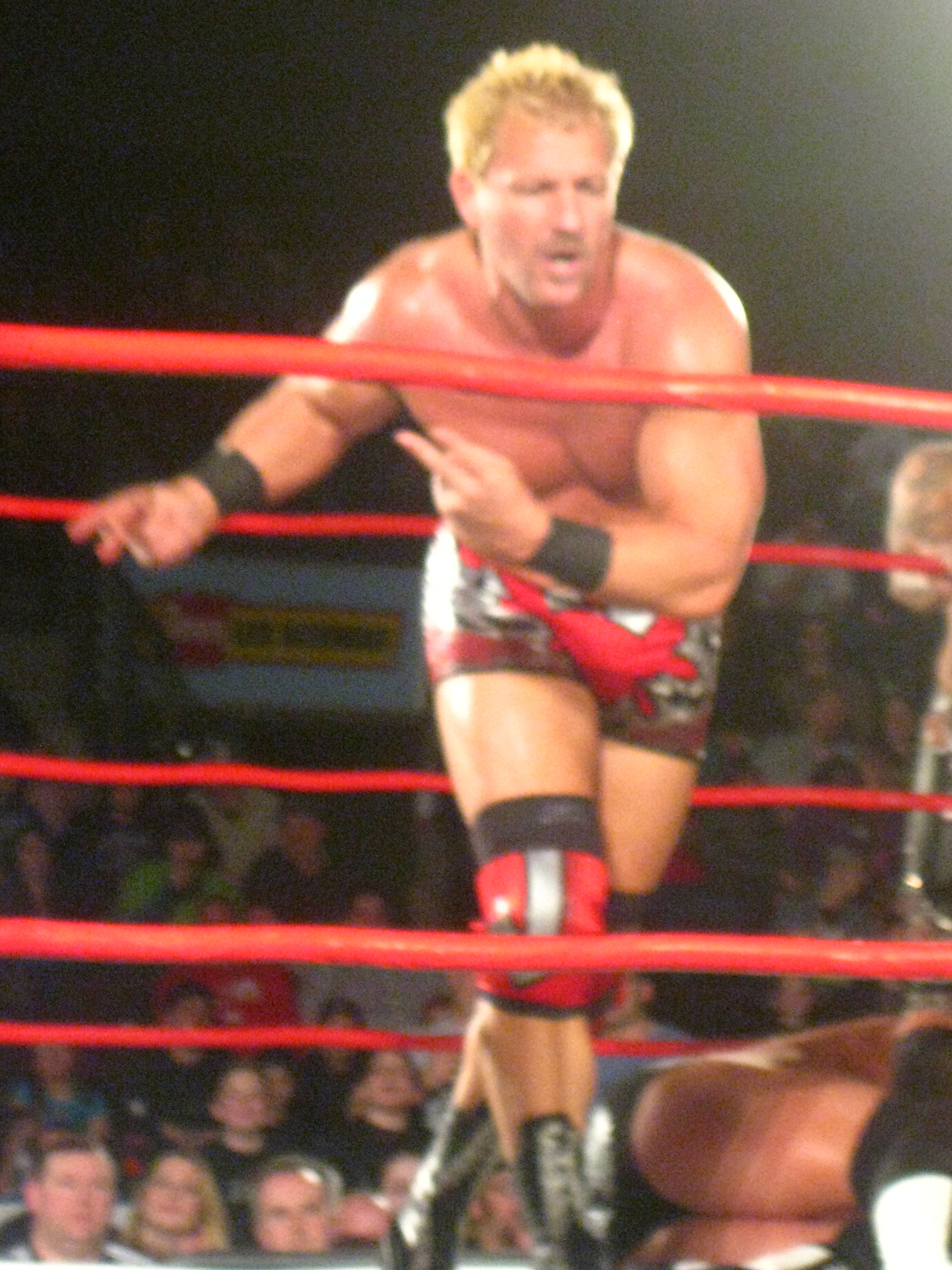
Jeff Jarrett (pictured) defeated Raven to win the NWA World Heavyweight Championship after Unbreakable.

The three-way main event began an extended storyline revolving around the participants. At Bound for Glory, A.J. Styles defeated Christopher Daniels in a Thirty-Minute Iron Man match to retain the TNA X Division Championship. TNA then held a Four-on-Four Tag Team Elimination X match at TNA's Genesis PPV event on November 13. In that match, Team Ministry (Alex Shelley, Daniels, Samoa Joe, and Roderick Strong) defeated the team of Austin Aries, Chris Sabin, Matt Bentley, and Sonjay Dutt. After the contest, Joe assaulted Daniels, performing his signature Muscle Buster maneuver on him twice, the second time on a steel chair. Daniels suffered an injury in the storyline due to the attack, sidelining him until December 11 at TNA's Turning Point PPV event. At that event, Daniels saved Styles from an assault by Joe following Joe's victory over Styles to win the TNA X Division Championship. Daniels then challenged Joe for the championship at TNA's Final Resolution PPV event on January 15, 2006, but Joe retained the title. At TNA's Against All Odds PPV event on February 12, 2006, Daniels, Joe, and Styles competed in another three-way match for the TNA X Division Championship; Joe gained the pinfall to retain the title. The three competed again, but this time in a three-way Ultimate X match for the championship at TNA's Destination X PPV event on March 12, 2006. Daniels won, becoming the new TNA X Division Champion. The rivalry ended on the April 13, 2006 episode of Impact! when Joe defeated Daniels to win back the championship. TNA promoted an Unbreakable rematch at their 2009 Turning Point PPV event on November 15. This time it was a three-way match for the TNA World Heavyweight Championship between Styles, Daniels, and Joe. Styles won the match to retain the championship. This encounter reignited the feud between Styles and Daniels, leading to a bout for the TNA World Heavyweight Championship at TNA's Final Resolution PPV event on December 20, 2009, which Styles also won.

Following Unbreakable, Raven lost the NWA World Heavyweight Championship to Jeff Jarrett at a Border City Wrestling event on September 15 after interference by America's Most Wanted (Chris Harris and James Storm; AMW) and Scott D'Amore to win the championship. Raven did not receive a rematch for the title. Instead, Jarrett was scheduled to defend the championship against a returning Kevin Nash at Bound for Glory. Nash could not attend the event due to a legitimate medical emergency, with TNA holding a Ten-Man Gauntlet match to find his replacement at the show. Rhino won the match and took Nash's place in the main event. There, Rhino defeated Jarrett to win the NWA World Heavyweight Championship. Rhino also competed in a Four Way Monster's Ball match at Bound for Glory against Abyss, Jeff Hardy, and Sabu. Rhino was the victor in this encounter as well.

The Naturals (Andy Douglas and Chase Stevens) defended the NWA World Tag Team Championship against AMW on the October 22 episode of Impact!. They were unsuccessful in their defense, as AMW won the match by pinfall. AMW and The Naturals fought again at Bound for Glory, where AMW retained the championship.

A three-way Ultimate X match was held at Bound for Glory, with the winner becoming number-one contender to the TNA X Division Championship. Petey Williams defeated Chris Sabin and Matt Bentley in the match. A rematch was held on the November 3 episode of Impact!, which Williams also won.

TNA management were very upset with Sean Waltman after he failed to appear to participate in the Four Way Elimination Tag Team match. This anger was due to Waltman being one-half of the winners of the Chris Candido Memorial Tag Team Tournament. Despite not appearing on the show, Waltman was in Orlando and dressed to compete, but did not arrive at the arena in time. Waltman was not used by TNA until January 15, 2006 when he appeared at their Final Resolution PPV event.

== Results ==
No.	Results	Stipulations	Times
1^{P}	Cassidy Riley vs. Jerrelle Clark ended in a no contest	Singles match	1:56
2^{P}	Shark Boy defeated Mikey Batts	Singles match	3:20
3	3Live Kru (B.G. James, Konnan, and Ron Killings) defeated The Diamonds in the Rough (David Young, Elix Skipper and Simon Diamond)	Six-man tag team match	4:20
4	Austin Aries defeated Roderick Strong	Singles match	8:00
5	Kip James and Monty Brown defeated Apolo and Lance Hoyt (with Sonny Siaki)	Tag team match	9:58
6	Chris Sabin defeated Petey Williams	Singles match	12:34
7	Abyss (with James Mitchell) defeated Sabu	No Disqualification match	11:30
8	Bobby Roode defeated Jeff Hardy	Singles match	9:07
9	The Naturals (Andy Douglas and Chase Stevens) (with Jimmy Hart) (c) defeated Alex Shelley and Johnny Candido, America's Most Wanted (Chris Harris and James Storm) and Team Canada (A-1 and Eric Young)^{1}	Four-way elimination match for the NWA World Tag Team Championship	18:01
10	Raven (c) defeated Rhino	Raven's Rules match for the NWA World Heavyweight Championship	14:28
11	A.J. Styles defeated Christopher Daniels (c) and Samoa Joe	Three-way match for the TNA X Division Championship	22:50
(c) / – the champion(s) heading into the match; P / – the match was broadcast on the pre-show

Four Way Elimination Tag Team match

1.

No.	Wrestler	Team	Eliminator	Notes
1	Johnny Candido	Alex Shelley and Johnny Candido	Andy Douglas	Douglas pinned Candido with a roll-up after kicking him in the groin.
2	Chris Harris	America's Most Wanted	Eric Young	Young pinned Harris with a roll-up after A-1 hit him with a hockey stick.
3	A-1	Team Canada	Chase Stevens	Stevens pinned A-1 after Douglas and him slammed A-1 into the mat face-first with their signature tag team Natural Disaster maneuver.
4	Andy Douglas and Chase Stevens	The Naturals	N/A	Winners
