= Johnny Candido =

American professional wrestler

Personal information
- Born: John Candito; June 11, 1982 (age 44) Spring Lake, New Jersey, U.S.
- Family: Chris Candido (brother)

Professional wrestling career
- Ring name: Johnny Candido
- Billed height: 6 ft 2 in (1.88 m)
- Billed weight: 250 lb (110 kg)
- Trained by: Chris Candido
- Debut: 2000

John Candito (born June 11, 1982) is an American semi-retired professional wrestler, and is the younger brother of late professional wrestler Chris Candido. He is best known under the ring name Johnny Candido.

== Professional wrestling career ==
Candido trained under his brother and debuted in 2000. He did not reach a prominent position on the independent circuit until the death of his brother in April 2005, at which point he competed in several tribute matches. Candido later wrestled in a World Wrestling Entertainment dark match against Balls Mahoney and Axl Rotten.

He appeared at Unbreakable on September 11, 2005, to watch the four-way elimination match for the NWA World Tag Team Championship. The winners of the Chris Candido Memorial Tag Team Tournament, Alex Shelley and Sean Waltman, were scheduled to face incumbent champions The Naturals, Team Canada, and America's Most Wanted. When Waltman no-showed the event, Candido left the audience, climbed onto the ring apron and assumed the role of Shelley's tag team partner. Candido and Shelley were eliminated soon after when Candido was pinned.

On September 17, 2005, Candido won a tournament to win the NWA Midwest Heavyweight Championship, which had been vacated upon his brother's Chris' death. He later vacated the championship in January 2007.

== Championships and accomplishments ==
- NWA Midwest
  - NWA Midwest Heavyweight Championship (1 time)
- National Wrestling Superstars
  - NWS Hardcore Championship (2 times)
