= A-1 (wrestler) =

Canadian professional wrestler

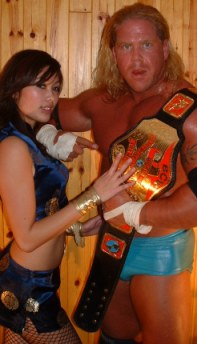
- A-1 (right) with valet Jade Chung after capturing the BCW Can-Am Heavyweight Championship on December 12, 2004.

Personal information
- Born: Alastair Charles Ralphs; May 22, 1977 (age 49) Placentia, Newfoundland, Canada
- Education: University of Windsor

Professional wrestling career
- Ring name(s): A-1; A1; A-One; Alastair Ralphs; Alistair Ralphs; Allistar Ralphs; Buddy Austin
- Billed height: 6 ft 0 in (1.83 m)
- Billed weight: 256 lb (116 kg)
- Billed from: Niagara Falls, Ontario
- Trained by: Scott D'Amore
- Debut: 2001

Alastair Charles Ralphs (born May 22, 1977) is a Canadian professional wrestler and former bodybuilder, better known by his ring name, A-1 (alternatively spelled A1 or A-One). He is best known for his appearances with Total Nonstop Action Wrestling (TNA), from 2004 to 2007, as part of Team Canada.

== Early life ==
Ralphs was born in Placentia Bay, Newfoundland, and relocated to Dunnville, Ontario at the age of five. He later moved to Windsor, Ontario to attend the University of Windsor.

== Professional wrestling career ==
=== Border City Wrestling (2001–2005) ===
Alastair Ralphs was trained by Scott D'Amore in the Can-Am Wrestling School, and debuted in D'Amore's Border City Wrestling promotion in 2001. After spending three years as an undercard talent, Ralphs became A-1, a cocky, arrogant heel, forming an alliance with Johnny Swinger. He defeated D'Lo Brown for the BCW Heavyweight Championship on December 12, 2004, in Belleville, Michigan at "A Night of Appreciation for Sabu".

On January 23, 2005, at New Year's Revolution, Ralphs interrupted the Hall of Fame induction ceremony, complaining that he was being overshadowed by older wrestlers. Scott D'Amore responded with a jibe aimed at Ralph's previous career as a bodybuilder, leading to a brawl between Ralphs and D'Amore. Following a distraction from Jade, A-1 was able to powerbomb D'Amore through a table. Ralphs went on to retain the heavyweight title in a match with Abyss, using Abyss's own chain to knock him unconscious.

Ralphs lost the BCW Heavyweight Championship to Bobby Roode on July 22, 2005. In the course of his reign as champion he faced well-known veterans such as Jim Neidhart and King Kong Bundy.

=== World Wrestling Entertainment (2004) ===
On the November 27 episode of WWE Velocity, A-1 and Rory McAllister lost to Luther Reigns and Mark Jindrak. On the November 28 episode of Sunday Night Heat, A-1 lost to Viscera.

=== Total Nonstop Action Wrestling (2004–2007) ===
On July 16, 2004, Ralphs appeared in Total Nonstop Action Wrestling, losing to Sabu. He reappeared on March 13, 2005, as a member of Team Canada, replacing the injured Johnny Devine at Destination X 2005 and teaming with Bobby Roode, Eric Young and Petey Williams to face Chris Harris, James Storm, B.G. James and Konnan. He wrestled on TNA Impact! throughout April and May 2005, teaming with other members of Team Canada or accompanying them to the ring. At Hard Justice on May 15, Ralphs took part in the Gauntlet for the Gold. He entered at number six and was eliminated by The Outlaw and B.G. James. at No Surrender (2005), Team Canada (A-1, Bobby Roode and Eric Young) defeated The Naturals (Andy Douglas and Chase Stevens) and Lance Hoyt in a six-man tag team match. at Sacrifice (2005), Team Canada (A-1, Bobby Roode, Eric Young and Petey Williams) defeated America's Most Wanted (Chris Harris and James Storm) and The Naturals (Andy Douglas and Chase Stevens) in an Eight-man tag team match. At Unbreakable, Team Canada (A-1 and Young) competed in a four-way elimination tag team match for the NWA World Tag Team Championship which was won by The Naturals. at Bound for Glory (2005), Team Canada (A-1, Roode and Young) defeated 3Live Kru (B.G. James, Konnan and Ron Killings). At Genesis (2005), Team Canada (A-1, Bobby Roode and Eric Young) lost to 3Live Kru (B.G. James, Konnan and Ron Killings) in a 6-Sided Stick Fight. at Turning Point (2005), Team Canada (A-1, Bobby Roode, Eric Young and Petey Williams) defeated 3Live Kru and Kip James. on the December 31 episode of Impact, A-1 lost to Rhino. on the Final Resolution (2006) Preshow, Team Canada (A-1, Eric Young and Petey Williams) defeated Jay Lethal, Kenny King, and Lance Hoyt. on the January 21 episode of Impact, Team Canada (A-1, Petey Williams and Eric Young) defeated Ron Killings, Lance Hoyt and Shark Boy. on the Against All Odds (2006) preshow, A-1 lost to Ron Killings. on the February 18 episode of Impact, A-1, Petey Williams and Bobby Roode lost to Ron Killings and Team 3-D in a six-man tag team match. on the February 25 episode of Impact, A-1 and Bobby Roode defeated The James Gang. at Lockdown (2006), Team Canada (A-1, Eric Young and Bobby Roode) lost to Team 3D (Brother Ray, Brother Devon and Brother Runt) in a Six Sides of Steel Anthem match.

On the May 11, 2006, episode of TNA Impact!, Larry Zbyszko asked Team Canada coach Scott D'Amore for assistance in his feud with Raven. D'Amore eventually agreed to help Zbyszko rid TNA of Raven, and nominated A-1 to face Raven in a match at TNA Sacrifice 2006 in May 2006, a match that A-1 lost. on the Slammiversary (2006) preshow, Team Canada (A-1 and Young) defeated The Naturals. On the June 29, 2006, episode of Impact!, TNA Management Director Jim Cornette disbanded Team Canada.

A-1 soon began wrestling sporadically, facing Ron Killings in the pre-show of the Hard Justice pay-per-view and against Eric Young at the No Surrender pay-per-view, losing both times. He also took part in the Kevin Nash Open Invitational X-Division Gauntlet Battle Royal at Bound for Glory (2006), despite not being a part of the X-Division. He was eliminated by both Maverick Matt and Kazarian.

A-1 was released by TNA on February 23, 2007.

=== Independent circuit (2007–present) ===
After leaving TNA, A1 wrestled on the independent circuit in Canada and the United States.

After being inactive from 2009 to 2015, A-1 quietly returned to a Border City Wrestling show in January 2015. He has since been an active member of their roster. Since returning, A-1 has also made appearances for UCW in Michigan and Greektown Pro Wrestling in Toronto.

On October 14, 2017, A1 unsuccessfully challenged Eli Drake for the Impact Global Championship in a match for Border City Wrestling. The match later aired as part of an Impact One Night Only special Canadian Clash.

=== Impact Wrestling (2018) ===
He returned to Impact Wrestling on March 3, 2018, at the Impact One Night Only special March Breakdown pay-per view, where he teamed with Allie defeating the team of Braxton Sutter and K. C. Spinelli.

On June 1, 2018, A1 returned making appearances on Xplosion tapings in a tag team match teaming with El Reverso losing to the team of Kongo Kong and Matt Sydal. The following night in a match for Xplosion, A1 teamed with Moose defeating Austin Aries and Phil Atlas.

== Personal life ==
Ralphs has a son named Vitali.

== Championships and accomplishments ==
- Border City Wrestling
  - BCW Can-Am Heavyweight Championship (1 time)
- Pro Wrestling Illustrated
  - PWI ranked him #253 of the top 500 singles wrestlers in the PWI 500 in 2007
