= Hardcore Justice =

Total Nonstop Action Wrestling pay-per-view event series

- TNA Hardcore Justice logo
- Promotions: Impact Wrestling
- Other names: Hard Justice (2005–2009)
- First event: Hard Justice (2005)
- Last event: Hardcore Justice (2021)

Hardcore Justice, originally known as Hard Justice, was an annual professional wrestling Impact Plus event produced by Impact Wrestling. It was originally introduced as a pay-per-view (PPV) event held by Total Nonstop Action Wrestling (TNA) in 2005. The first event was held in May 2005 and after 2006, they had all been held in August. Until 2010, the event was known as Hard Justice. TNA dropped Hardcore Justice as a pay-per-view event in 2013 after announcing only four pay-per-view events would take place through the year and it was retained as a special episode of TNA's weekly broadcast of Impact Wrestling.

== History ==
The inaugural Hard Justice event took place on May 15, 2005, at the TNA Impact! Zone in Orlando, Florida. The event opened with a ten-bell salute to Chris Candido, who died on April 28, 2005, due to blood clot from surgery, for a leg injury he suffered on the inaugural Lockdown event, which took part on April 24 of that year. On August 8, 2010, The event was re-named the event to Hardcore Justice, in honor of Extreme Championship Wrestling (ECW).

== Events ==
#	Event	Date	City	Venue	Main event	Ref.
1	Hard Justice (2005)	May 15, 2005	Orlando, Florida	TNA Impact! Zone	Jeff Jarrett (c) vs. A.J. Styles for the NWA World Heavyweight Championship, with Tito Ortiz as special guest referee	
2	Hard Justice (2006)	August 13, 2006	Orlando, Florida	TNA Impact! Zone	Jeff Jarrett (c) vs. Sting for the NWA World Heavyweight Championship	
3	Hard Justice (2007)	August 12, 2007	Orlando, Florida	TNA Impact! Zone	TNA and IWGP World Heavyweight Champion Kurt Angle vs. TNA World Tag Team and TNA X Division Champion Samoa Joe in a Winner takes all match	
4	Hard Justice (2008)	August 10, 2008	Trenton, New Jersey	Sovereign Bank Arena	Samoa Joe (c) vs. Booker T in a Six Sides of Steel Weapons match for the TNA World Heavyweight Championship	
5	Hard Justice (2009)	August 16, 2009	Orlando, Florida	TNA Impact! Zone	Kurt Angle (c) vs. Matt Morgan vs. Sting in a three-way match for the TNA World Heavyweight Championship	
6	Hardcore Justice (2010)	August 8, 2010	Orlando, Florida	TNA Impact! Zone	Rob Van Dam vs. Sabu in a Hardcore match	
7	Hardcore Justice (2011)	August 7, 2011	Orlando, Florida	Impact Zone	Sting (c) vs. Kurt Angle for the TNA World Heavyweight Championship	
8	Hardcore Justice (2012)	August 12, 2012	Orlando, Florida	Impact Zone	Austin Aries (c) vs. Bobby Roode in a Last Chance match for the TNA World Heavyweight Championship	
9	One Night Only: Hardcore Justice 2	July 5, 2013 (Note: The event was taped on March 19, 2013.)	Orlando, Florida	Impact Zone	Jeff Hardy and Brother Runt vs. Team 3D (Bully Ray and Devon)	
10	Hardcore Justice (2013)	August 15, 2013	Norfolk, Virginia	Constant Center	Chris Sabin (c) vs. Bully Ray in a steel cage match for the TNA World Heavyweight Championship	
10	Hardcore Justice (2013)	August 22, 2013 (Note: The event was taped on August 15, 2013.)	Norfolk, Virginia	Constant Center	Aces & Eights (Mr. Anderson, Devon, Garrett Bischoff, Knux and Wes Brisco) vs. The Main Event Mafia (Magnus, Rampage Jackson, Samoa Joe and Sting) and A.J. Styles in a five-on-five Loser Leaves TNA match	
11	One Night Only: Hardcore Justice 3	January 10, 2014 (Note: The event was taped on December 29, 2013.)	Lowell, Massachusetts	Lowell Memorial Auditorium	Team Angle (Kurt Angle, Abyss, James Storm and Samoa Joe) vs. Team Roode (Bobby Roode, Jessie Godderz, Magnus and Robbie E) in a five-on-five Lethal Lockdown match	
12	Hardcore Justice (2014)	August 20, 2014 (Note: The event was taped on August 5, 2014.)	New York City, New York	Grand Ballroom	Austin Aries vs. Bobby Roode vs. Eric Young vs. Gunner vs. James Storm vs. Magnus in a Six Sides of Steel Cage match, where the winner would receive a future TNA World Heavyweight Championship match	
13	One Night Only: Hardcore Justice 2015	April 1, 2015 (Note: The event was taped on February 13, 2015.)	Orlando, Florida	Impact Zone	Bobby Roode vs. Lashley in a Last Man Standing match	
14	Hardcore Justice (2015)	May 1, 2015 (Note: The event was taped on March 16, 2015.)	Orlando, Florida	Impact Zone	Eric Young vs. Kurt Angle in a Stretcher match	
15	Hardcore Justice (2021)	April 10, 2021	Nashville, Tennessee	Skyway Studios	Team Dreamer (Eddie Edwards, Rich Swann, Trey Miguel and Willie Mack) vs. Violent By Design (Deaner, Eric Young, Joe Doering and Rhino) in an Eight-man Hardcore War match	
(c) – refers to the champion(s) heading into the match
