= Chase Stevens =

American professional wrestler (born 1979)

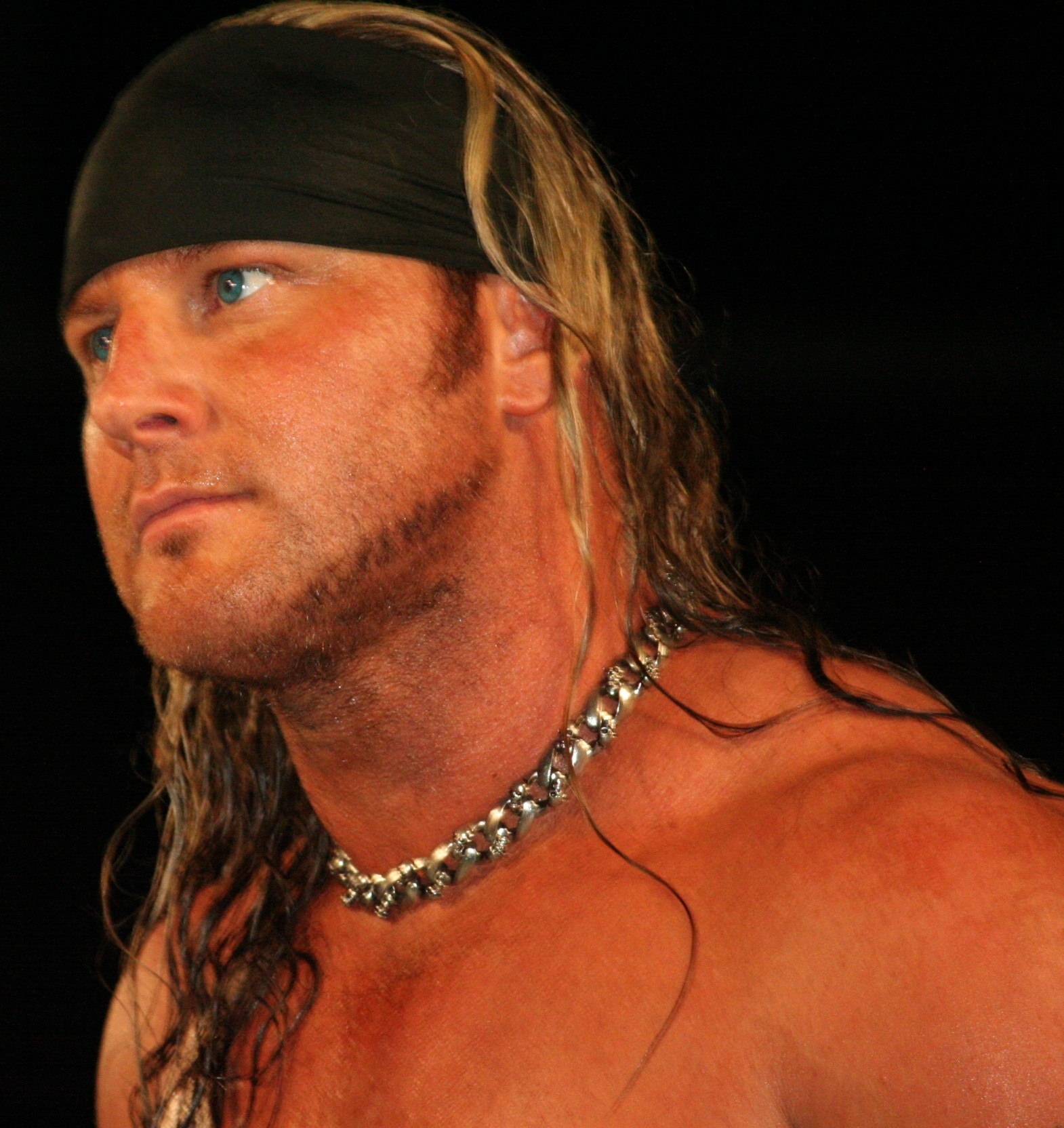
- Stevens in 2016

Personal information
- Born: Chase Bradley Stevens; January 17, 1979 (age 47) Santa Maria, California, U.S.

Professional wrestling career
- Ring name(s): Chase Bradley; Glacius; Lance Taylor; Shadow Walker; Chase Stevens
- Billed height: 6 ft 0 in (1.83 m)
- Billed weight: 215 lb (98 kg)
- Billed from: Santa Maria, California
- Trained by: Tracy Smothers; Mike Samples
- Debut: 1998

Chase Bradley Stevens (born January 17, 1979) is an American professional wrestler, best known under the ring name of "The Natural" Chase Stevens. He is known primarily for his work in Total Nonstop Action Wrestling (TNA), where he was a member of The Naturals alongside his tag team partner Andy Douglas.

== Professional wrestling career ==
=== Early career (1998–2003) ===
In high school, Chase Stevens was a Golden Gloves boxing champion. After attending a professional wrestling training session, in order to watch a friend, Stevens decided to become a wrestler and joined the training school. After several weeks, veteran wrestler Tracy Smothers took him under his wing and became his trainer and mentor. Stevens debuted in 1998 under a wrestling mask as "Glacius", losing to fellow trainee Johnny B. Dazzled.

Stevens found a niche as a tag team specialist, teaming with Blaze as "High Velocity" and Cassidy O'Reilly as "The Hotshots". The latter team appeared with Total Nonstop Action Wrestling in July 2002, and were given full-time contracts. The team split when Reilly left TNA due to travel problems, and Stevens was sent to USA Championship Wrestling for seasoning.

In USA Championship Wrestling Stevens was placed in a tag team with Andy Douglas by Bob Ryder. While on a fishing trip they chose the name "Natural Heat", which was later shortened to "The Naturals". The Naturals became a pair of sneaky, cheating villains.

The Naturals began working for Jerry Lawler's Memphis Wrestling promotion in 2003, where they were renamed "The Alternative Express". The Alternative Express - a gothic pair of rock fans who wore black clothing and recolored their hair and fingernails - were managed by The Goddess Athena.

=== Total Nonstop Action Wrestling / Impact Wrestling ===
==== The Naturals (2003–2006) ====
The Naturals were brought into TNA in late 2003, immediately beginning a lengthy feud with America's Most Wanted. In the course of the feud, they defeated America's Most Wanted for the NWA World Tag Team Championship on July 7, 2004. The Naturals successfully defended their titles against Triple X, but were eventually beaten by Chris Harris and Elix Skipper (one member of each team) on September 8, 2004.

In 2005, The Naturals formed an alliance with Chris Candido, who also became their manager. On April 26, they defeated America's Most Wanted to become NWA World Tag Team Champions for a second time. The sudden death of Candido two days later led to a surge in popularity for The Naturals, eventually turning them into fan favorites.

On June 19, 2005, at Slammiversary, The Naturals were assisted in a title defence against Team Canada by Jimmy Hart. They were managed by Hart throughout mid-2005, with their reign ending on the October 22 episode of TNA Impact!. Then they lost to America's Most Wanted following interference from Jeff Jarrett and Gail Kim. They were defeated by AMW in their rematch at Bound for Glory on October 23, again following interference from Kim.

During the October 25 Impact! tapings, Stevens injured his neck after landing badly during a match. He was diagnosed as having suffered an avulsion fracture of his C5 and C6 vertebrae, in addition to herniating his C4 vertebra (described by TNA as the "mildest form of trauma associated with a broken neck"). The injury did not require surgery, and Stevens returned for Genesis on November 13, teaming with Douglas and Lance Hoyt in a loss to the Diamonds in the Rough.

In April 2006, Stevens began a bit of singles work in light of his partner being injured by Scott Steiner. Stevens' singles run did not go overly well, as he was unable to post a victory in any of his competitions, losing to Samoa Joe twice, Abyss once, and losing an Xscape match at Lockdown 2006.

In June 2006, Stevens and Douglas began to be managed by the returning Shane Douglas after he approached them, asking to be their manager. The duo accepted his offer and were shown "training" in several vignettes which aired on Impact!.

==== Newly Franchised (2006–2007) ====
At Victory Road, The Naturals returned in brand new black and yellow attire (to replace their black and pink attire) and were managed by Shane Douglas. They were called 'The Newly Franchised Naturals', in reference to Shane's nickname 'The Franchise', and beat The Diamonds In The Rough. On the August 17 edition of Impact!, Stevens defeated Chris Harris, Frankie Kazarian and B.G. James to win a tag team championship shot for him and Andy. Shane took their tag title match away from them after they lost a match on Impact! to teach them a lesson. They then won a Tag Team "Triple Chance" Battle Royal the following month at No Surrender. This suggested that their push that had been going for several months would finally conclude with them getting a tag title shot at Bound for Glory, but they ended up losing a Four Corners match on the undercard of the show, not even getting the title shot. The Naturals then began a feud with Team 3D and defeated them in a Tables match on TNA's primetime debut. Then it started speculation that the storyline would once again get better for The Naturals, but then on the December 21 episode of Impact!, Shane turned his back on The Naturals after they lost the second Tables match to Team 3D, saying "This experiment is over".

Stevens wrestled Lance Hoyt at Final Resolution on January 14, 2007. He lost the match, which led to Shane coming out asking why he was wearing the Franchised gear, when he said the experiment was over. This led to Stevens shoving him, with security separating the two. On May 10 both Stevens and Douglas were released from their contracts.

==== Sporadic appearances (2013–2022) ====
Stevens returned to TNA on March 17, 2013, as he took part in 10 man Battle Royal which featured TNA Wrestlers from the past and present, the match was won by Matt Morgan. On March 18, 2013, The Hot Shots (Cassidy Riley and Chase Stevens) were defeated by the Aces & Eights (Wes Brisco and Garett Bischoff) in the first round of the TNA Tag Team Tournament. At Slammiversary, on June 19, 2022, Stevens made an unannounced appearance as a participant in the Reverse Battle Royal, which he failed to win as he was eliminated by Shera.

=== World Wrestling Entertainment / WWE (2007–2008, 2012) ===
Stevens alongside his Naturals partner, Andy Douglas, were originally going to receive a try-out match for World Wrestling Entertainment at a Raw taping in September 2007, but was cancelled when Douglas posted the tryout information on his Myspace without WWE's permission.

Stevens later appeared on the March 21, 2008 edition of WWE SmackDown, alongside his Naturals partner Andy Douglas, fighting in a losing effort to the Big Show. He made another appearance on the September 16, 2008 edition of ECW, losing to Jack Swagger and again the next week against Mike Knox.

Stevens was in attendance for a tryout at the March 12, 2012 WWE RAW SuperShow in Cleveland. The next day, on March 13, 2012, Stevens wrote on his Twitter page that he was backstage in Columbus for the SmackDown tapings, saying he was as ready as he will ever be.

=== Independent circuit (2007–present) ===
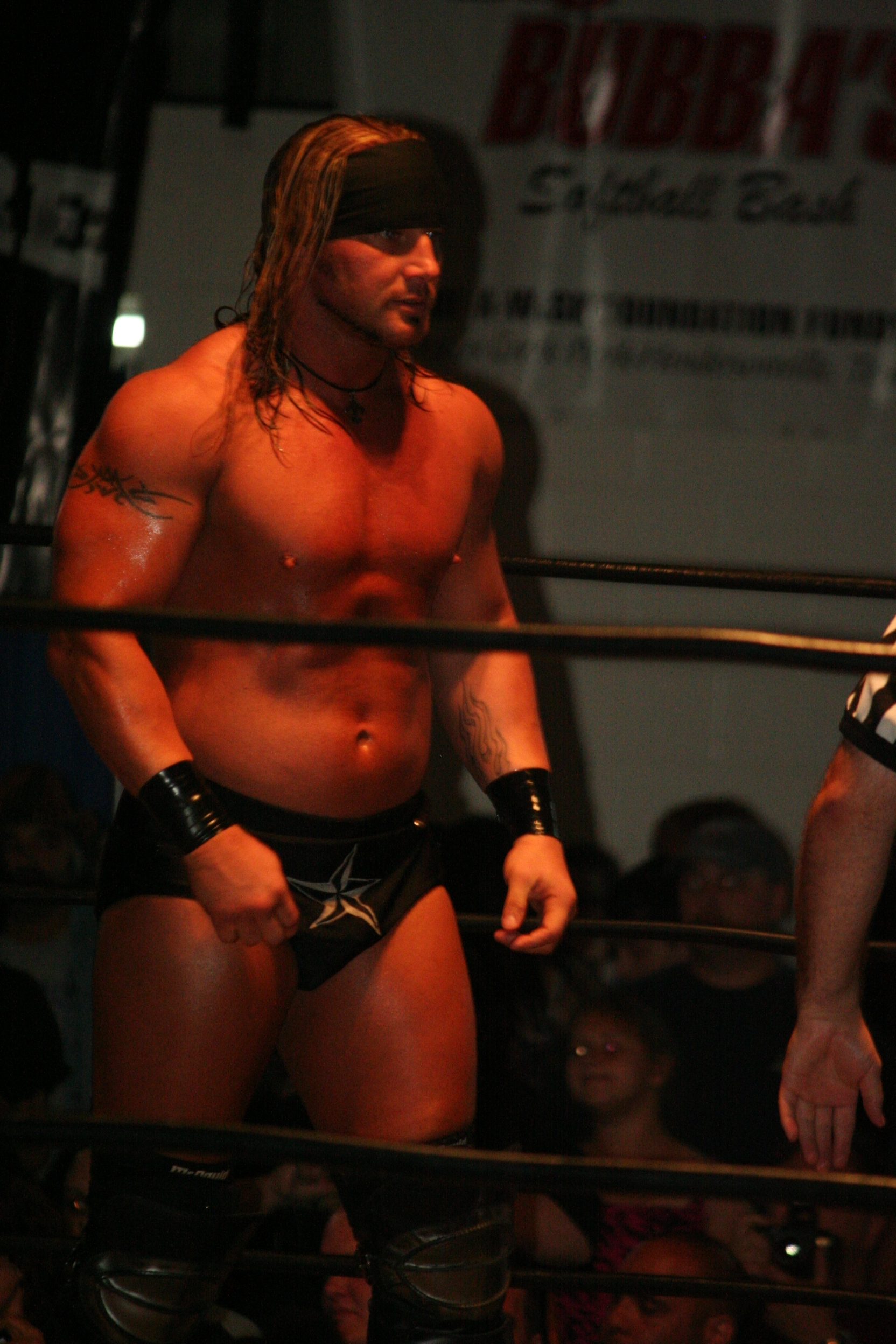
Stevens at an independent show, 2012

Stevens returned to wrestle on the southeast independent circuit with Naturals partner Andy Douglas. He has wrestled in many organizations such as Showtime All-Star Wrestling, United States Wrestling Organization, United Wrestling Association and The Jerry Lawler Tribute Show where he and Andy Douglas defeated Big Bully Douglas and Seven. In late 2008 Andy Douglas turned on Stevens while Stevens teamed with Arrick Andrews and Nikki Vaughn in a tag team match against the A-Team thus Douglas aligned himself with The A-Team joining TNA Alumni, David Young and Rick Santel. This created a bitter rivalry between the two spanning over a year long and culminating in several matches, until Andy's retirement in early 2010. Chase Stevens is a former SAW International Heavyweight Champion, a championship he won from Kid Kash on the same night Andy Douglas and himself, had their final war. He lost the title to Phill Shatter.

On September 28, 2012, Stevens defeated Matt Hardy in Pigeon Forge, Tennessee at KFW Black Harvest 2012. On October 20, 2012, Stevens defeated John Skyler, Jon Malus and Sixx at WrestleForce Fall Brawl 3: All Or Nothing to win the WrestleForce Championship.

On November 3, 2012, at Crossfire Wrestling's TV Taping The Hot Shots (Cassidy Riley and Chase Stevens) defeated Diamonds in the Rough (David Young and Sigmon) in Nashville, Tennessee.

On May 17, 2013, at WrestleForce Revenge Stevens teamed with TNA Superstars Crimson, D.O.C and Gunner defeating Team WrestleForce Brady Pierce, Cedric Alexander, John Skyler and Jon Malus.

On May 30, 2014, Stevens participated in a match for the UCW (Universal Championship Wrestling) Heavyweight title in a street fight, but lost the match. He faced Rhyno after "The Headliner" Chris Michaels was a no-show.

On June 14, 2013, Stevens challenged Rob Conway for the NWA World Heavyweight Championship at the NWA SAW Gathering of the Champions event, the match ended in a draw after time had expired. In 2014, Chase Stevens participated in a Triple Threat Match in Puerto Rico for the Entertainment Wrestling Organization's (EWO) World Championship against Dameon Slugga and Mike Piconose, during EWO's "Renacer" (Reborn) event, where Stevens successfully captured the championship. On May 11, 2015, Stevens was announced as part of the roster for the Global Force Wrestling (GFW) promotion.

== Acting career ==
Stevens appeared in the film Chained: Code 207 alongside TNA wrestler Crimson and OVW wrestler Ryan Howe.

== Championships and accomplishments ==
- American Pro Wrestling Alliance
  - APWA World Tag Team Championship (2 times) - with Bobby Shields, Christian York, Jock Samson and The Stro (1) and Damon Divine (1)
- Big Bad Wrestling
  - BBW Championship (1 time)
  - BBW 24/7 Championship (1 time)
  - BBW Tag Team Championship (2 times)– with Damon Divine
- Birchfield Promotions
  - BPW Tag Team Championship (1 time) - with Andy Douglas
- Battle Zone Wrestling
  - BZW Tag Team Championship (1 time)– with Billy Braze
- Coastal Championship Wrestling
  - CCW International Championship (1 time)
- Entertainment Wrestling Organization
  - EWO World Championship (1 time)
- Great Championship Wrestling
  - GCW Tag Team Championship (1 time) - with Andy Douglas
- Hardcore Wrestling Federation
  - HWF Cruiserweight Championship (1 time)
- International Wrestling Association
  - IWA World Tag Team Championship (1 time) - with Andy Douglas
- North Carolina Wrestling Association
  - 10th Annual Ivan Koloff Tag Team Tournament (2018) – with Ricky Morton
- New South Championship Wrestling
  - NSCW Heavyweight Championship (1 time)
- North American Wrestling Alliance
  - NAWA Championship (1 time)
  - Hercules Cup (2020)
- NWA Florida
  - NWA Southern Heavyweight Championship (1 time)
- Omni Pro Wrestling
  - Omni Pro Mid-South Championship (1 time)
- Pro Wrestling Illustrated
  - PWI ranked him #90 of the 500 best singles wrestlers in the PWI 500 in 2005
- Remix Pro Wrestling
  - Remix Pro Heavyweight Championship (1 time)
- Showtime All-Star Wrestling
  - SAW International Heavyweight Championship (1 time)
- SmashMouth Pro Wrestling
  - SPW North American Championship (1 time)
- Totally Lethal Wrestling
  - TLW Heavyweight Championship (1 time)
- Total Nonstop Action Wrestling
  - NWA World Tag Team Championship (3 times) – with Andy Douglas
- Tri-State International Wrestling Association
  - TSIWA Cruiserweight Championship (1 time)
  - TSIWA Tag Team Championship (1 time)– with Andy Douglas
- Ultimate Championship Wrestling
  - UCW Southern Heavyweight Championship (1 time)
- USA Championship Wrestling
  - USACW Heavyweight Championship (1 time)
  - USACW Tag Team Championship (1 time) - with Andy Douglas
- Heroes And Legends Wrestling
  - HLW Smoky Mountain Championship (1 time)
- United Wrestling Association
  - UWA Heavyweight Championship (1 time)
- United States Wrestling Organization
  - USWO Heavyweight Championship (3 time)
- Wrestle Birmingham
  - Wrestle Birmingham Heavyweight Championship (1 time)
- WrestleForce
  - WrestleForce Championship (1 time)
