= The Naturals =

Professional wrestling tag team

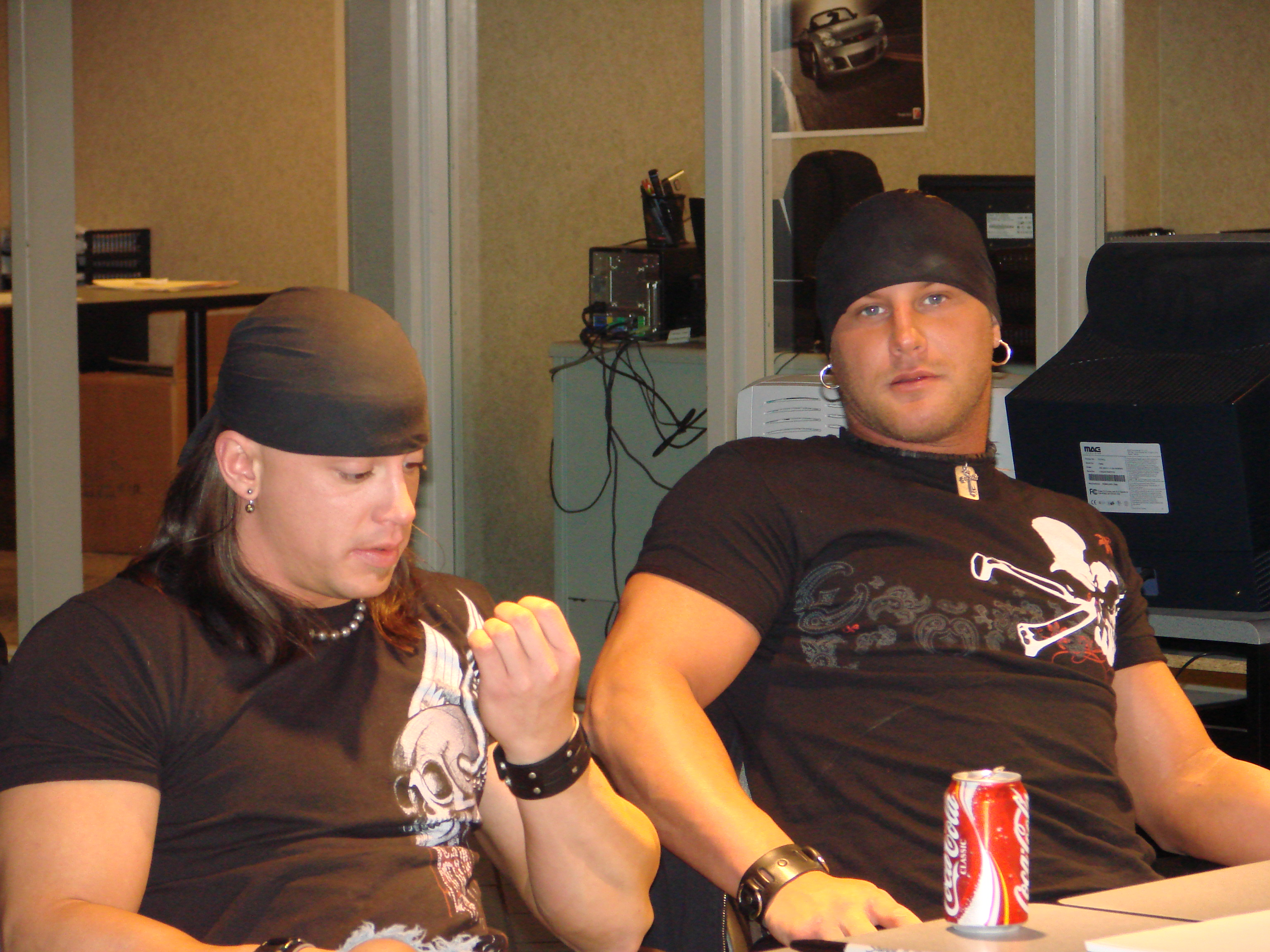

Tag team
- Members: Andy Douglas; Chase Stevens
- Name(s): The Alternative Express; Natural Heat; The Newly Franchised Naturals; The Naturals
- Billed heights: 6 ft 1 in (1.85 m) - Douglas; 6 ft 0 in (1.83 m) - Stevens
- Combined billed weight: 440 lb (200 kg)
- Hometown: Nashville, Tennessee
- Debut: 2003
- Disbanded: 2010

The Naturals were a professional wrestling tag team made up of Andy Douglas and Chase Stevens. They are best known for their work in Total Nonstop Action Wrestling (TNA), where they are former three-time NWA World Tag Team Champions.

== History ==
While working for USA Championship Wrestling, Douglas and Stevens were paired together by booker Bob Ryder. They were briefly known as "Natural Heat" before shortening their name to "The Naturals". In USA CW, The Naturals were old-school Southern style heels.

Douglas and Stevens began working for Jerry Lawler's Memphis Wrestling promotion in 2003, where they were renamed "The Alternative Express". The Alternative Express—a gothic pair of rock fans who wore black clothing and recolored their hair and fingernails—were managed by The Goddess Athena. Athena later left The Naturals after a falling out, and they gained a new manager, April Pennington.

=== Total Nonstop Action Wrestling ===
Douglas and Stevens were brought into Total Nonstop Action Wrestling (TNA) in late 2003 as "The Naturals", immediately beginning a lengthy feud with America's Most Wanted (AMW). In the course of the feud, they defeated AMW for the NWA World Tag Team Championship on July 7, 2004 in a twelve-second long match after hitting James Storm with one of the title belts. The Naturals successfully defended their titles against Triple X, but were eventually beaten by Chris Harris and Elix Skipper (one member of each team) on September 8, 2004.

In 2005, the Naturals formed a stable with Chris Candido, who also became their manager. They became peripheral members of Planet Jarrett in early 2005. On April 26 they defeated America's Most Wanted to become NWA World Tag Team Champions for a second time. The sudden death of Candido two days later led to them turning face due to fan reaction. They stated later in May that they were being advised through the ordeal by a "legendary figure" in professional wrestling, though they declined to say who at the time.

On June 19, 2005 at Slammiversary the Naturals were assisted in a title defense against Team Canada by Jimmy Hart, who was revealed to be their secret advisor. Hart acted as their manager throughout the summer of 2005 before he left his voluntary on-screen capacities with TNA in September. In their feud with Team Canada, they briefly formed an alliance with AMW. Their animosity, however, won out as infighting cost them an eight-man tag team match with Team Canada at Sacrifice on August 14.

The Naturals survived an Elimination Match involving Team Canada, AMW, and Alex Shelley (who was supposed to team with Sean Waltman, who no-showed, and instead was assisted by Johnny Candido) to retain the titles at Unbreakable on September 11. Their reign ended on the October 22 episode of Impact! when they lost to AMW following interference from Jeff Jarrett and Gail Kim. They were defeated by AMW in their rematch at Bound For Glory on October 23, again following interference from Kim.

On October 25, Stevens injured his neck when he landed bad on his head during a tag-team match being taped for the October 29 episode of Impact! The injury was minor, and not expected to require surgery. The match, however, was omitted, and a replacement match was taped the next day. He returned on November 13 at Genesis.

The Naturals went to the background in the early months of 2006. After Scott Steiner brutalized Douglas in March, Stevens spent about two months in singles action in the X Division with limited success. When Douglas returned and they tagged again and "The Franchise" Shane Douglas (no relation to Douglas), a former NWA World Heavyweight Champion and TNA official, took an interest in them. After they lost to The Diamonds in the Rough on June 15, Shane confronted them, telling them they were squandering their talent. Invoking his friend and their former manager Chris Candido, he offered to be their new manager. With much audience approval, they accepted Shane's offer, and, after a month of intense training overseen by The Franchise, faced and defeated The Diamonds in the Rough in a rematch at Victory Road. The Naturals then entered a feud with Team 3D, even handing Team 3D their first loss in a Tables Match in TNA, but after a loss to Team 3D in a Tables Match one month later, Shane Douglas abandoned them, saying "This experiment is over".

After the end of the Shane Douglas angle TNA were said to be done with the Naturals as a team, saying that they had given the team several opportunities to show their charisma, but had not delivered. The situation has since been rectified to an extent and after two house show appearances for TNA, one in January and one in March (2007), The Naturals returned to TNA on Xplosion, in mid-April 2007.

The Naturals appeared at the Lockdown FanFest held in St. Louis on April 14, 2007. Stevens and Douglas were released from TNA Wrestling as of May 10, 2007, but TNA Mobile announced soon afterward that they would be working for TNA without a contract from time to time.

=== International Wrestling Association ===
The Naturals went to IWA in mid-2007, where they held the IWA World Tag Teams Championships until they vacated the titles after leaving the IWA.

=== World Wrestling Entertainment ===
The Naturals competed in a taped match for the 21 March 2008 episode of SmackDown, teaming with Luke Hawx in a losing effort against The Big Show. Stevens wrestled Jack Swagger on ECW in a losing effort on September 16, 2008. Stevens was later defeated by Mike Knox on September 23's edition of ECW, followed by a post-match beating from Swagger which prompted a Tommy Dreamer run-in.

== Championships and accomplishments ==
- Birchfield Pro Wrestling
  - BPW Tag Team Championship (1 time)
- Great Championship Wrestling
  - GCW Tag Team Championionship (1 time)
- Total Nonstop Action Wrestling
  - NWA World Tag Team Championship (3 times)
- USA Championship Wrestling
  - USACW Tag Team Championionship (1 time)
- International Wrestling Association
  - IWA World Tag Team Championship (1 time)
