= Destination X (2010) =

2010 Total Nonstop Action Wrestling pay-per-view event

- Promotional poster featuring various TNA wrestlers
- Promotion: Total Nonstop Action Wrestling
- Date: March 21, 2010
- City: Orlando, Florida
- Venue: Impact Zone
- Attendance: 1,100
- Tagline: A Night When the X Division Will Shine

Pay-per-view chronology
← Previous; Against All Odds	Next → Lockdown

Destination X chronology
← Previous; 2009	Next → 2011

The 2010 Destination X was a professional wrestling pay-per-view (PPV) event produced by the Total Nonstop Action Wrestling (TNA) promotion. It took place on March 21, 2010 at the TNA Impact! Zone in Orlando, Florida. The event was originally advertised as an all X Division pay-per-view. It was the sixth event under the Destination X chronology and the third event of the 2010 TNA PPV schedule.

In October 2017, with the launch of the Global Wrestling Network, the event became available to stream on demand.

== Storylines ==
Other on-screen personnel
Commentators	Mike Tenay
Commentators	Taz
Ring announcer	Jeremy Borash
Referee	Earl Hebner
Referee	Brian Hebner
Referee	Brian Stiffler

Destination X feature nine professional wrestling matches that involved different wrestlers from pre-existing scripted feuds and storylines. Wrestlers were portrayed as villains, heroes or less distinguishable characters in the scripted events that built tension and culminated into a wrestling match or series of matches.

== Results ==
No.	Results	Stipulations	Times
1	Kazarian defeated Amazing Red, Brian Kendrick and Daniels	X Division Ladder match to determine the #1 contender for the TNA X Division Championship at Lockdown	13:38
2	Tara (c) defeated Daffney	Singles match for the TNA Women's Knockout Championship	06:42
3	Rob Terry (c) defeated Magnus	Singles match for the TNA Global Championship	01:23
4	The Motor City Machine Guns (Alex Shelley and Chris Sabin) defeated Generation Me (Jeremy and Max Buck)	Ultimate X match to determine #1 contenders for the TNA World Tag Team Championship	12:03
5	The Band (Scott Hall and Syxx-Pac) defeated Eric Young and Kevin Nash	Tag team match Since The Band won they received TNA Contracts Had The Band lost they must leave TNA	07:56
6	Doug Williams (c) defeated Shannon Moore	Singles match for the TNA X Division Championship	06:19
7	Hernandez and Matt Morgan (c) defeated Beer Money, Inc. (James Storm and Robert Roode)	Tag team match for the TNA World Tag Team Championship	11:22
8	Kurt Angle defeated Mr. Anderson by submission	Singles match	17:36
9	A.J. Styles (c) (with Chelsea and Ric Flair) vs. Abyss ended to a no contest	Singles match for the TNA World Heavyweight Championship	14:56
(c) / – the champion(s) heading into the match
