= Destination X (2016) =

Professional wrestling event

- Promotion: Total Nonstop Action Wrestling
- Date: July 12, 2016
- City: Orlando, Florida
- Venue: Impact Zone
- Tagline: Free on Pop TV

Destination X chronology
← Previous; 2015	Next → 2017

Impact Wrestling special episodes chronology
← Previous; The Final Deletion	Next → Turning Point

The 2016 Destination X (aka Impact Wrestling: Destination X) was a professional wrestling event produced by Total Nonstop Action Wrestling (TNA) promotion, which took place on July 12, 2016 at the Impact Zone in Orlando, Florida. It was the twelfth event under the Destination X chronology. It was featured as a live special edition of TNA's weekly broadcast of Impact Wrestling.

Six professional wrestling matches were contested at the event. The main event was a title versus title match, in which the World Heavyweight Champion Lashley and the X Division Champion Eddie Edwards defended their respective titles. Moose made his TNA debut during the match and attacked both participants, resulting in the match ending in a no contest. On the undercard, Sienna retained the Knockouts Championship against Gail Kim, Jade and Marti Bell in a four-way match, Bram defeated Abyss. DJ Z competed at the event twice; first he won a six-man ladder match to become the #1 contender for the X Division Championship and then DJZ defeated Mike Bennett.

== Background ==
TNA continued the tradition that began in 2012 where the current X Division Champion can invoke "Option C" – a concept in which the current X Division Champion may voluntarily vacate the championship in exchange for a TNA World Heavyweight Championship match at that year's Destination X event. On the July 5, 2016 episode of Impact Wrestling, TNA World Heavyweight Champion Lashley offered a title for title option to X Division Champion Eddie Edwards in lieu of Edwards having to invoke "Option C."

== Event ==
=== Preliminary matches ===
The event kicked off with a ladder match to determine the #1 contender for the X Division Championship between DJ Z, Rockstar Spud, Mandrews, Braxton Sutter, Trevor Lee and Andrew Everett. DJ Z knocked out Lee with a DDT and then knocked Everett off the ladder and climbed the ladder to retrieve the X for the win. Mike Bennett attacked DJ Z from behind. Later that night, DJ Z challenged Bennett to a match, which Bennett accepted.

The match was followed by an interview between Lashley and Eddie Edwards, hyping up their main event match, during which Lashley attacked Edwards and hit him with a running powerslam and then tried to hit him with a chair but Davey Richards countered and hit Lashley with the chair in the back forcing Richards to retreat.

Next, Bram took on Abyss. A distraction by Rosemary allowed Bram to hit a running knee to Abyss sending him into an interfering Crazzy Steve on the apron and then Bram rolled him up for the win.

Next, Sienna defended the Knockouts Championship against Gail Kim, Jade and Marti Bell. Kim nailed an Eat Defeat to Belle and covered her for the pinfall but Allie put Belle's foot on the ropes. Gail then attempted to nail a suicide dive but Sienna caught her with a Silencer to retain the title.

Later, Mike Bennett took on DJ Z. Bennett tried to retreat to the backstage but The Helms Dynasty, Braxton Sutter and Mandrews prevented him from escaping and tossed him into the ring, where DJ Z rolled him up for the win.

It was followed by an unsanctioned fight between Drew Galloway and Ethan Carter III. They brawled with each other throughout the arena forcing several security guards, referees and wrestlers to separate them from each other.

=== Main event match ===
The main event was a title versus title match, in which the World Heavyweight Champion Lashley took on the X Division Champion Eddie Edwards and both men defended the World Heavyweight Championship and the X Division Championship respectively. Lashley countered a Boston Knee Party by Edwards into a powerslam and knocked out the referee in the process who got kicked by Edwards' feet. Lashley then tried to hit Edwards with the World Heavyweight Championship title belt but Richards prevented him from using the belt and then Edwards and Davey Richards hit Lashley with the title and Edwards got a near-fall on Lashley. Mike Bennett then interfered in the match by punching the referee. Bennett then called out the debuting Moose, who attacked Lashley, Edwards and Richards.

== Results ==
No.	Results	Stipulations	Times
1	DJ Z defeated Rockstar Spud, Mandrews, Braxton Sutter, Trevor Lee and Andrew Everett (with Gregory Shane Helms)	X Division Ladder match to determine the #1 contender for the TNA X Division Championship	05:53
2	Bram defeated Abyss (with Crazzy Steve)	Singles match	04:05
3	Sienna (c) (with Allie) defeated Gail Kim, Jade and Marti Bell	Four-way match for the TNA Knockouts Championship	04:30
4	DJZ defeated Mike Bennett (with Maria)	Singles match	05:31
5	Drew Galloway vs. Ethan Carter III ended in a no contest	Unsanctioned fight	03:37
6	Lashley (c) vs. Eddie Edwards (c) (with Davey Richards) ended in a no contest	Singles match for the TNA World Heavyweight and TNA X Division Championships	10:45
(c) / – the champion(s) heading into the match
