= Destination X (2015) =

TNA professional wrestling event in Orlando, Florida

- Promotional poster featuring Rockstar Spud, Austin Aries and Kurt Angle
- Promotion: Total Nonstop Action Wrestling
- Date: May 11, 2015 (aired June 10, 2015)
- City: Orlando, Florida
- Venue: Impact Zone
- Attendance: 600

Destination X chronology
| ← Previous; 2014 | Next → 2016 |

Impact Wrestling special episodes chronology
| ← Previous; May Mayhem | Next → Bell To Bell |

The 2015 Destination X (also known as Impact Wrestling: Destination X) was a professional wrestling event produced by the Total Nonstop Action Wrestling (TNA) promotion, which took place on May 11, 2015 at the Impact Zone in Orlando, Florida. It was the eleventh event under the Destination X chronology. Like the previous year's event, this event was not held on pay-per-view (PPV) and was instead featured as a special edition of TNA's weekly broadcast of Impact Wrestling, which aired on June 10, 2015.

Seven professional wrestling matches were contested at the event. Kurt Angle defended the World Heavyweight Championship twice at the event; first against Rockstar Spud in the opening match, who had earned the title shot by invoking Option C which required him to vacate the X Division Championship and secondly against Austin Aries in the main event, who had cashed in his Feast or Fired briefcase for the title match. Angle retained the title in both matches. On the undercard, three-way qualifiers took place with the winners qualifying for a three-way match for the vacant X Division Championship and Taryn Terrell defended the Knockouts Championship against Awesome Kong and Bram issued an open challenge for a No Holds Barred match, which was answered by Crimson.

== Production ==
=== Background ===
Destination X was held by TNA as an X Division-exclusive event since the 2011 edition. Beginning with the 2012 edition, Destination X also became a staple for the X Division Champions to invoke Option C, which required them to vacate the title to earn a shot for the World Heavyweight Championship at the event.

=== Storylines ===
At Hardcore Justice, Kenny King defeated Rockstar Spud, Tiger Uno and Mandrews in a ladder match to win the X Division Championship. On the May 29 episode of Impact Wrestling, Spud regained the X Division Championship from King in an X Division Gauntlet match. On the June 3 episode of Impact Wrestling, Spud invoked Option C, thus vacating the title in exchange for a World Heavyweight Championship match against Kurt Angle at Destination X. Later that night, Angle and Spud defeated Ethan Carter III and Tyrus in a tag team match. After the match, Austin Aries announced that he would be cashing in his Feast or Fired briefcase for the World Heavyweight Championship against the winner of Angle and Spud's title match at Destination X.

The vacancy of X Division Championship resulted in three-way qualifying matches being announced for Destination X, with the winners of the match qualifying for a three-way match for the vacant X Division Championship at a later date.

== Event ==
=== Preliminary matches ===
The event kicked off with a World Heavyweight Championship match between the defending champion Kurt Angle and challenger Rockstar Spud. However, Ethan Carter III protested before the match that he had earned the #1 contender status for the World Heavyweight Championship and was not getting his title shot but Spud and Austin Aries were getting title shots before him and refused to leave the ring until Angle threatened to snap his ankle forcing EC3 to retreat. As the match between Angle and Spud progressed, Spud nailed an Underdog on Angle but got a near-fall and then Spud tried to pick up Angle but Angle snapped his ankle and applied an ankle lock to force Spud to submit to retain the title.

After the match, The Dollhouse cut a promo in which Dollhouse leader, the Knockouts Champion Taryn Terrell announced that if Awesome Kong wanted a title shot against her for the Knockouts Championship then it would be a Lingerie Pillow Fight otherwise Terrell would not give her a title shot.

Next, the first three-way match in the X Division CHampionship tournament took place between Low Ki, Manik and Crazzy Steve. After knocking out Manik and Steve with a running dropkick, Ki nailed a Warrior's Way on Manik for the win.

Next, the second three-way match in the X Division Championship tournament took place between Tigre Uno, DJ Z and Mandrews. DJ Z knocked out Mandrews with a That DDT Tho and climbed the top rope but Uno knocked DJ Z off the top rope and nailed a Sabertooth Splash to Mandrews for the win. After the match, Jessie Godderz attacked DJ Z by hitting him a clothesline, turnbuckle powerbomb and then hit a military press slam over the top rope onto the concrete.

After the match, The Dollhouse (Taryn Terrell, Jade and Marti Bell) came out and called out Awesome Kong for the Lingerie Pillow Fight for the Knockouts Championship but Kong did not come out in a lingerie and then Jade and Bell tried to force her to wear the lingerie but Kong attacked both of them and Terrell demanded to be declared the winner until Brooke arrived and confronted and ripped off Terrell's robe.

Later, the third three-way X Division Championship tournament match took place between Grado, Cruz and Kenny King. Grado knocked King out of the ring with a back body drop and then hit a Roll 'N Slice to Cruz for the win.

This was followed by the penultimate match, in which Bram issued an open challenge to any past wrestler from TNA and then Crimson made his return to TNA by answering Bram's challenge. Crimson tried to apply a double underhook crossface on Bram but Bram bit his hand and delivered a Brighter Side of Suffering to Crimson for the win.

=== Main event match ===
In the main event, Kurt Angle defended the World Heavyweight Championship for the second time at the event against Austin Aries. Angle avoided a Heat Seeking Missile by Aries, leading to Aries getting crashed into the guardrail outside the ring. Angle tossed him back into the ring and attempted an Angle Slam but Aries countered with a roll-up for a near-fall. Angle then applied an ankle lock on Aries and forced him to submit to retain the title. Ethan Carter III attacked Angle after the match and raised the World Heavyweight Championship title belt above his head.

== Results ==
| No. | Results | Stipulations | Times |
|---|---|---|---|
| 1 | Kurt Angle (c) defeated Rockstar Spud via submission | Singles match for the TNA World Heavyweight Championship; This was Spud's Option C World Title match | 08:35 |
| 2 | Low Ki defeated Manik and Crazzy Steve | TNA X Division Championship tournament match | 03:30 |
| 3 | Tigre Uno defeated DJ Z and Mandrews | Three-way TNA X Division Championship tournament match | 05:25 |
| 4 | Taryn Terrell (c) (with Jade and Marti Bell) vs. Awesome Kong ended in a no contest | Lingerie Pillow Fight for the TNA Knockouts Championship | 00:00 |
| 5 | Grado defeated Cruz and Kenny King | Three-way TNA X Division Championship tournament match | 05:12 |
| 6 | Bram defeated Crimson | No Holds Barred match | 04:27 |
| 7 | Kurt Angle (c) defeated Austin Aries via submission | Singles match for the TNA World Heavyweight Championship (This was Aries' Feast or Fired World Title match) | 17:57 |
(c) / – the champion(s) heading into the match
