= Destination X (2013) =

- Promotional poster featuring Chris Sabin, Bully Ray, Suicide, and several other wrestlers
- Promotion: Total Nonstop Action Wrestling
- Date: July 18, 2013
- City: Louisville, Kentucky
- Venue: Broadbent Arena
- Attendance: 3,200
- Tagline: LIVE and FREE on Spike TV

Destination X chronology
← Previous; 2012	Next → 2014

Impact Wrestling special episodes chronology
← Previous; Before the Glory	Next → Hardcore Justice

The 2013 Destination X (also known as Impact Wrestling: Destination X) was a professional wrestling event produced by Total Nonstop Action Wrestling (TNA), which took place on July 18 at the Broadbent Arena in Louisville, Kentucky. It was the ninth event under the Destination X chronology. Unlike the previous events, this event was not held on pay-per-view (PPV) and instead aired as a special live episode of Impact Wrestling on Spike TV.

Six matches were contested on the event, including one taped for a future episode of Xplosion. In the main event, Chris Sabin defeated Bully Ray to win his first World Heavyweight Championship in what was Sabin's Option C match, which he invoked by vacating the X Division Championship in exchange for a World Heavyweight Championship match at Destination X. The undercard featured first round tournament matches for the vacant X Division Championship and a match between Austin Aries and Bobby Roode in the 2013 Bound for Glory Series.

== Production ==
=== Background ===
On January 11, 2013, TNA announced that there would only be four pay-per-view events in 2013 and instead beginning pre-taped One Night Only events in place of them. Destination X was also dropped as a pay-per-view event and TNA resumed it as a special edition of its primary television program Impact Wrestling. Destination X was held by TNA as an X Division-exclusive event since the 2011 edition. Beginning with the 2012 edition, Destination X also became a staple for the X Division Champions to invoke Option C, which required them to vacate the title to earn a shot for the World Heavyweight Championship at the event.

=== Storylines ===
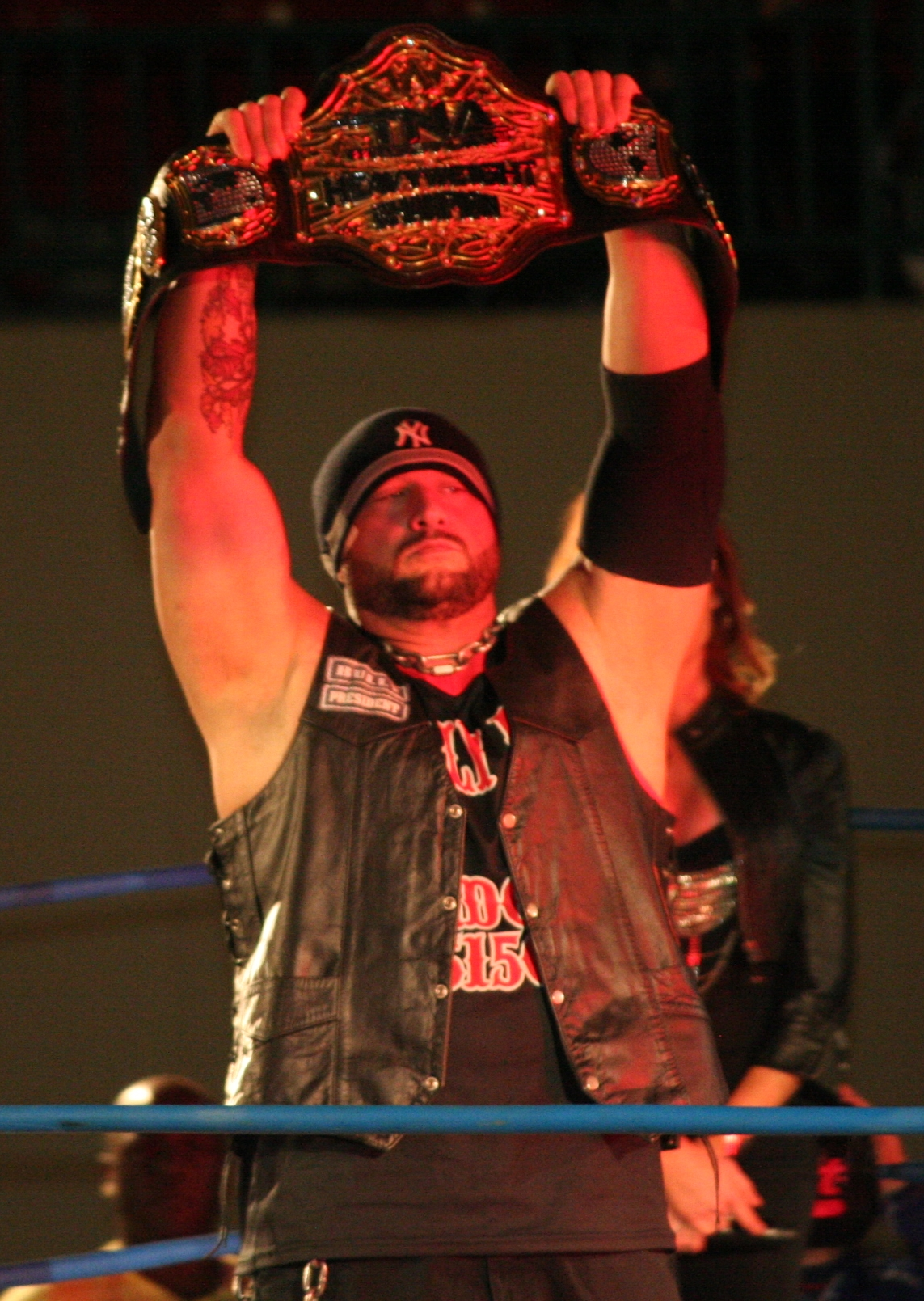
Bully Ray was the World Heavyweight Champion heading into Destination X.

Destination X featured professional wrestling matches that involved different wrestlers from pre-existing scripted feuds and storylines. Wrestlers portrayed villains, heroes, or less distinguishable characters in the scripted events that built tension and culminated in a wrestling match or series of matches.

At Slammiversary XI on June 2, 2013, after the Ultimate X Match where Chris Sabin won the X Division Championship, TNA general manager Hulk Hogan announced that just like in 2012, the reigning X Division champion would have the option to voluntarily vacate the title in exchange for a World Heavyweight Championship match at the 2013 Destination X special. Sabin was noncommittal as to whether he was going to cash in for the World Heavyweight title shot. On the June 27 episode of Impact Wrestling, Sabin lost the title in a three-way match (also involving Kenny King) to Suicide. Hogan then came out and announced that the real Suicide (T. J. Perkins) had been knocked out backstage and that the Suicide in the ring was an impostor. Hogan then gave Suicide until the end of the night to either unmask or be stripped of the championship. Suicide then unmasked, revealing himself to be Austin Aries. Aries confessed to being the person who jumped T. J. Perkins, explaining as he was the one who came up with the idea of the X Division Champion having the yearly right to exchange the X title for a match for the World Championship (and the one who traded in and won last year) and announced that he would be challenging Bully Ray for the World Championship. On the July 4 episode of Impact Wrestling, Sabin defeated Aries and Manik in a three-way match to regain the X Division Championship. The following week on Impact Wrestling, Sabin vacated the title in exchange for a match to wrestle for the World Heavyweight Championship against Bully Ray at Destination X.

== Event ==
Before the Destination X episode aired live on television, a match took place between Joseph Park and Devon for the July 24 episode of Xplosion. Park performed a frog splash on Devon from the middle rope for the win.

=== Preliminary matches ===
The opening match was a part of the 2013 Bound for Glory Series between Austin Aries and Bobby Roode. After a back and forth match, Austin nailed a brainbuster on Roode to win the match to score seven points in the BFG Series tournament and picking up his second consecutive win over Roode at Destination X.

It was then announced that three triple threat qualifying matches would take place at Destination X and the winners of the three matches would compete in an Ultimate X match on the July 25 episode of Impact Wrestling. The first qualifying match pitted Sonjay Dutt against Homicide and Petey Williams. Dutt nailed a moonsault double foot stomp on Homicide for the win.

In the next qualifying match, Manik took on Chavo Guerrero Jr. and Kenny King. After a back and forth action, Manik executed a Death from Above on King for the win.

The final qualifying match pitted Greg Marasciulo, Rockstar Spud and Rubix. Marasciulo executed a back-to-belly piledriver on Spud for the win.

The match was followed by a confrontation between the Knockouts Champion Mickie James and Gail Kim, which led to both women brawling with each other until several referees separated them to break up the brawl.

=== Main event match ===
In the main event, Bully Ray defended the World Heavyweight Championship against Chris Sabin, who invoked his Option C for the title shot. Ray's faction Aces & Eights interfered in the match on Ray's behalf and The New Main Event Mafia interfered in the match. Near the end of the match, Mr. Anderson handed over a hammer to Ray and then the referee was knocked out when Sabin performed a missile dropkick on Ray. A brawl occurred between Mafia and Aces & Eights and the two teams left the ring and then Ray tried to hit Sabin with a hammer but Sabin avoided it and then Ray tried to execute a Bully Bomb but Sabin hit him with the hammer in the head to win the title.

== Reception ==
Destination X was a very successful episode of Impact Wrestling as it experienced an increase in ratings and viewership numbers. It received a 1.2 cable rating and a viewership number of 1,494,000, the largest since the January 31 episode of Impact Wrestling.

== Aftermath ==
On the July 25 edition of Impact Wrestling, Manik defeated Sonjay Dutt and Greg Marasciulo in the Ultimate X finals of the tournament to win the vacant X Division Championship.

Bully Ray and Chris Sabin continued their feud over the TNA World Heavyweight Championship after Destination X. The week after Destination X on the July 25 episode of Impact Wrestling, it was announced that on the Hardcore Justice special, Chris Sabin would defend his title against Bully Ray in a steel cage match, which was won by Bully Ray.

== Results ==
No.	Results	Stipulations	Times
1^{X}	Joseph Park defeated Devon	Singles match	6:22
2	Austin Aries defeated Bobby Roode	Bound for Glory Series match	11:56
3	Sonjay Dutt defeated Homicide and Petey Williams	Three-way TNA X Division Championship tournament match	4:06
4	Manik defeated Chavo Guerrero and Kenny King	Three-way TNA X Division Championship tournament match	4:35
5	Greg Marasciulo defeated Rockstar Spud and Rubix	Three-way TNA X Division Championship tournament match	16:25
6	Chris Sabin defeated Bully Ray (c)	Singles match for the TNA World Heavyweight Championship; This was Sabin's Option C World Title match	18:44
(c) / – the champion(s) heading into the match; X / – the match was taped for a future broadcast of Xplosion
