= Destination X (2009) =

Total Nonstop Action Wrestling pay-per-view event

- Promotional poster featuring various TNA wrestlers
- Promotion: Total Nonstop Action Wrestling
- Date: March 15, 2009
- City: Orlando, Florida
- Venue: TNA Impact Zone
- Attendance: 1,100

Pay-per-view chronology
← Previous; Against All Odds	Next → Lockdown

Destination X chronology
← Previous; 2008	Next → 2010

The 2009 Destination X was a professional wrestling pay-per-view (PPV) event produced by Total Nonstop Action Wrestling (TNA), which took place on March 15, 2009, at the TNA Impact Zone in Orlando, Florida. It was the fifth event under the Destination X chronology.

In October 2017, with the launch of the Global Wrestling Network, the event became available to stream on demand.

== Storylines ==
Other on-screen personnel
Role:	Name:
Commentator	Mike Tenay
Commentator	Don West
Interviewer	Jeremy Borash
Interviewer	Lauren Thompson
Ring announcer	Jeremy Borash
Ring announcer	David Penzer
Referee	Earl Hebner
Referee	Rudy Charles
Referee	Mark Johnson
Referee	Andrew Thomas

Destination X featured nine professional wrestling matches that involved different wrestlers from pre-existing scripted feuds and storylines. Wrestlers portrayed villains, heroes, or less distinguishable characters in the scripted events that built tension and culminated in a wrestling match or series of matches.

== Results ==
No.	Results	Stipulations	Times
1	The Governor, Roxxi and Taylor Wilde defeated The Beautiful People (Angelina Love, Madison Rayne and Velvet Sky)	Six-Knockout tag team match	05:04
2	Brutus Magnus defeated Eric Young	Singles match	04:45
3	Matt Morgan defeated Abyss	Match of 10,000 Tacks	08:48
4	Awesome Kong (c) defeated Sojournor Bolt	Singles match for the TNA Women's Knockout Championship	04:17
5	Scott Steiner defeated Samoa Joe by disqualification	Singles match	01:30
6	A.J. Styles defeated Booker T (c) (with Sharmell)	Singles match for the TNA Legends Championship	09:14
7	Team 3D (Brother Devon and Brother Ray) defeated Beer Money, Inc. (James Storm and Robert Roode) (c) by Countout	No Disqualification Off the Wagon Challenge for the TNA World Tag Team Championship	11:20
8	Suicide defeated Alex Shelley (c), Chris Sabin, Consequences Creed and Jay Lethal	Ultimate X match for the TNA X Division Championship	14:10
9	Sting (c) defeated Kurt Angle	Singles match for the TNA World Heavyweight Championship with Jeff Jarrett as special guest referee and Mick Foley as special guest enforcer	13:50
(c) / – the champion(s) heading into the match
