= Destination X (2014) =

- Promotion: Total Nonstop Action Wrestling
- Date: June 26, 2014 (aired July 31, 2014)
- City: Midtown Manhattan, New York City
- Venue: Manhattan Center
- Attendance: 1,000
- Tagline: Free on Spike TV

Destination X chronology
← Previous; 2013	Next → 2015

Impact Wrestling special episodes chronology
← Previous; Genesis	Next → Hardcore Justice

The 2014 Destination X (a.k.a. Impact Wrestling: Destination X) was a professional wrestling event produced by the Total Nonstop Action Wrestling (TNA) promotion, which took place on June 26, 2014 at the Grand Ballroom in Midtown Manhattan, New York City. It was the tenth event under the Destination X chronology. The event was not held on pay-per-view (PPV) and was instead featured as a special edition of TNA's weekly broadcast of Impact Wrestling, airing on July 31 on Spike TV.

Five professional wrestling matches were contested at the event. In the main event, Lashley successfully defended the World Heavyweight Championship against Austin Aries, who earned the title shot by invoking Option C, vacating the X Division Championship. The undercard featured a mini-tournament for the vacant X Division Championship, featuring three-way matches as well as a World Tag Team Championship match, in which The Wolves (Davey Richards and Eddie Edwards) retained the titles against The Hardys (Matt Hardy and Jeff Hardy).

== Production ==
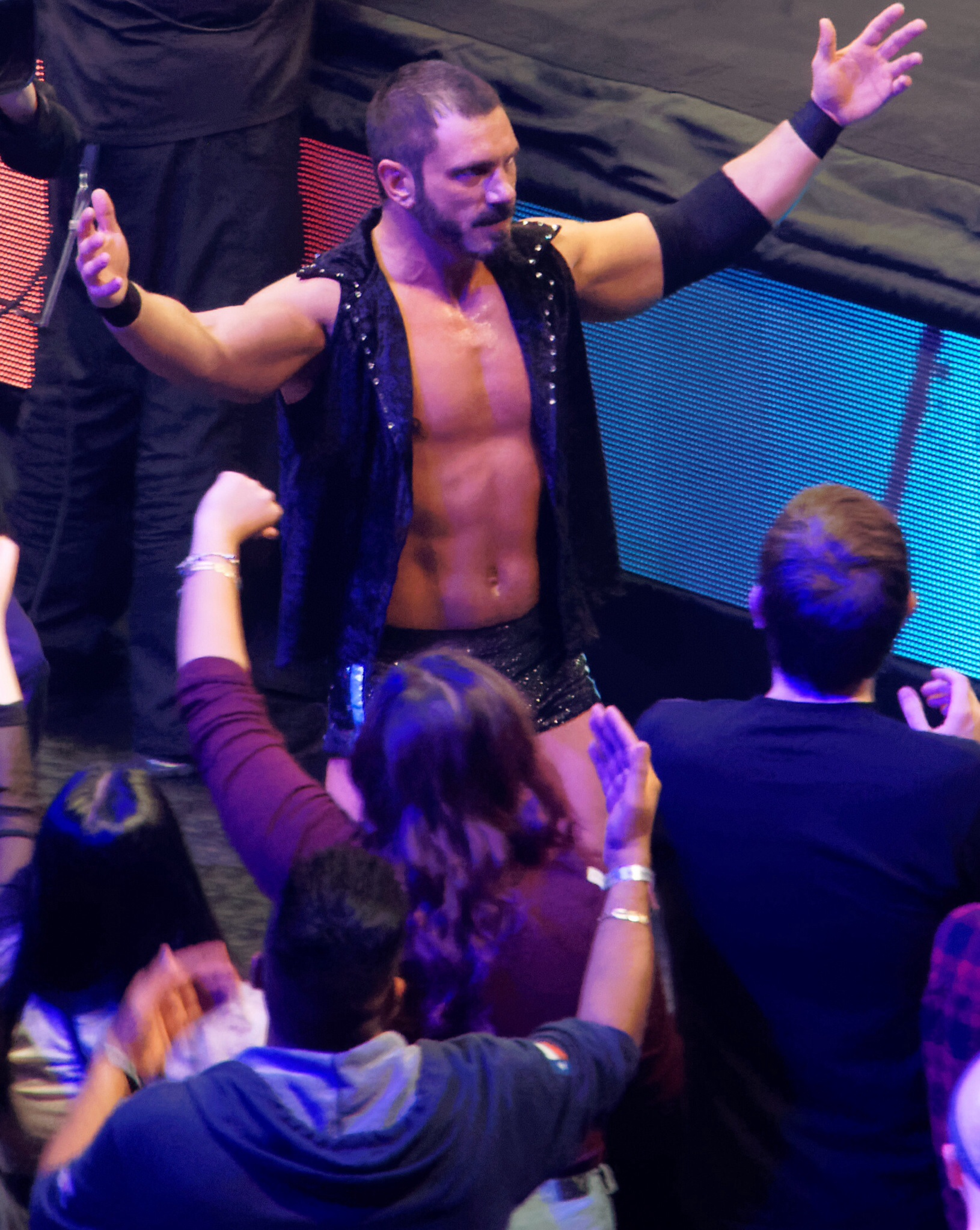
Austin Aries invoked Option C by vacating the X Division Championship and opting to challenge Lashley for the World Heavyweight Championship.

=== Background ===
Destination X was held by TNA as an X Division-exclusive event since the 2011 edition. Beginning with the 2012 edition, Destination X also became a staple for the X Division Champions to invoke Option C, which required them to vacate the title to earn a shot for the World Heavyweight Championship at the event.

On June 2, TNA announced that it would be holding its television tapings of Impact Wrestling at the Grand Ballroom of Manhattan Center in New York City later that month which would include the Destination X event as a special episode of Impact Wrestling to take place on June 26. On June 23, TNA confirmed on their website that the company would be returning to the six-sided ring starting at the Impact Wrestling tapings in New York City.

=== Storylines ===
On the July 10 episode of Impact Wrestling, the originator of the X Division Option C, Austin Aries defeated Sanada to win the X Division Championship. On the July 24 episode of Impact Wrestling, Aries invoked Option C by vacating the title to challenge Lashley for the World Heavyweight Championship at Destination X.

On the June 24 episode of Impact Wrestling, Matt Hardy returned to TNA for the first time since 2011 and reformed The Hardys with his brother Jeff Hardy and they challenged The Wolves (Davey Richards and Eddie Edwards) to a match for the World Tag Team Championship at Destination X, which Wolves accepted.

After Austin Aries vacated the X Division Championship, three-way semifinal matches were announced for Destination X with the winners of those matches competing for the vacant title.

== Event ==
=== Preliminary matches ===
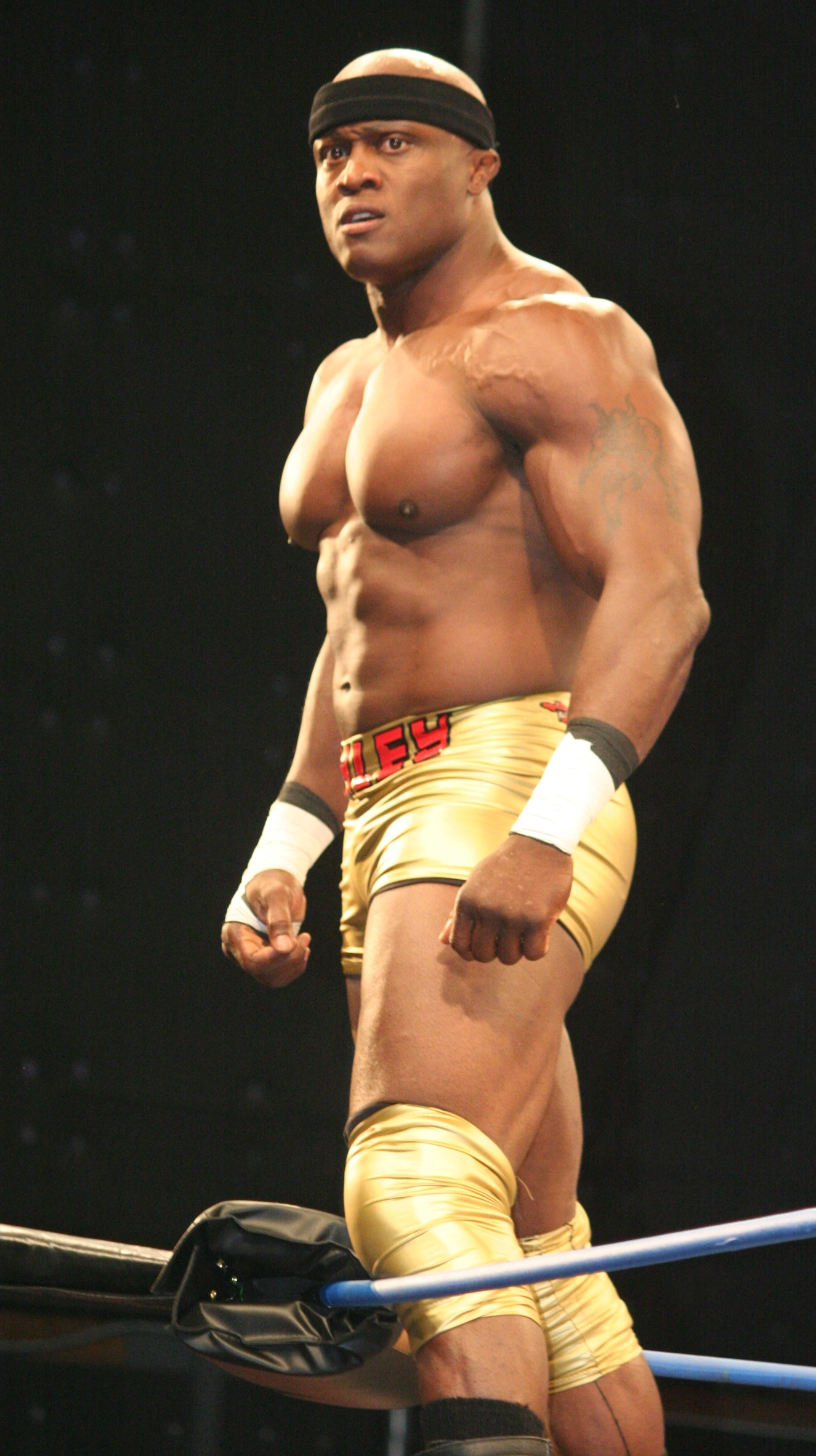
Lashley defended the TNA World Heavyweight Championship against Austin Aries in the main event of Destination X.

The event kicked off with Dixie Carter cutting a promo, in which she praised her nephew Ethan Carter III, while also discussing Rycklon and Gene Snitsky, who debuted the previous week and insulted Tommy Dreamer and Team 3D.

In the opening match, The Wolves (Davey Richards and Eddie Edwards) defended the World Tag Team Championship against The Hardys (Matt Hardy and Jeff Hardy). Wolves nailed a Force of Nature to Matt to retain the titles.

Next was the first three-way X Division Championship qualifying match between Low Ki, DJ Z and Manik. Ki nailed a Ki Krusher to Manik for the win.

Next, the second three-way X Division Championship qualifier took place between Sanada, Crazzy Steve and Brian Cage. Sanada hit a bridging tiger suplex to Steve for the win.

Next was the third and final three-way X Division Championship qualifier between Samoa Joe, Homicide and Tigre Uno. Joe hit a muscle buster to Homicide for the win.

=== Main event match ===
In the main event, Lashley defended the World Heavyweight Championship against Austin Aries. After avoiding a 450 splash and a suicide dive by Aries, Lashley delivered a spear to Aries to retain the title.

== Aftermath ==
On the August 7 episode of Impact Wrestling, Samoa Joe, Sanada and Low Ki wrestled in a three-way tournament final to crown the new X Division Champion, in which Joe was victorious.

== Results ==
No.	Results	Stipulations	Times
1	The Wolves (Davey Richards and Eddie Edwards) (c) defeated The Hardys (Matt Hardy and Jeff Hardy)	Tag team match for the TNA World Tag Team Championship	10:06
2	Low Ki defeated DJ Z and Manik	Three-way TNA X Division Championship tournament match	05:11
3	Sanada defeated Brian Cage and Crazzy Steve (with Rebel, Knux and The Freak)	Three-way TNA X Division Championship tournament match	03:48
4	Samoa Joe defeated Homicide and Tigre Uno	Three-way TNA X Division Championship tournament match	09:15
5	Lashley (c) defeated Austin Aries	Singles match for the TNA World Heavyweight Championship; This was Aries' Option C World Title match	20:06
(c) / – the champion(s) heading into the match
