= Destination X =

Professional wrestling event series

- GFW Destination X 2017 logo
- Promotions: Total Nonstop Action Wrestling (TNA); Global Force Wrestling (GFW)
- First event: Destination X (2005)

Destination X is a professional wrestling pay-per-view (PPV) event held by the American professional wrestling promotion TNA Wrestling. The event primarily revolves around the X-Division, the 2005, 2006, 2009, 2010, 2011 and 2012 events had Ultimate X matches.

It was announced on TNA Wrestling's official website in January 2011 that Destination X was moving from March to July, switching places with TNA's traditional July PPV, Victory Road. On the June 21, 2012, edition of Impact, it was announced that every year the current X Division Champion would have an opportunity to give up their title for a shot at the TNA World Heavyweight Championship at Destination X. On January 11, 2013, TNA announced that in 2013 there would be only four PPVs, not including Destination X, although Destination X would be featured as a special episode of Impact Wrestling from 2013 to 2017.

== History ==
The inaugural Destination X event took part on March 13, 2005, at the TNA Impact! Zone in Orlando, Florida. On 2017, after Anthem Sports & Entertainment purchased a majority stake of TNA, Anthem re-branded TNA as Impact Wrestling. On June of that year, with the Impact merging with Jeff Jarrett's Global Force Wrestling (GFW), Impact was re-branded to GFW. After the last Destination X event, which took place on August 17, 2017, at the Impact Zone in Florida, the company was once named Impact Wrestling with Jarrett leaving the company a couple months later on October.

== Events ==
#	Event	Date	City	Venue	Main event	Ref.
1	Destination X (2005)	March 13, 2005	Orlando, Florida	TNA Impact! Zone	Jeff Jarrett (c) vs. Diamond Dallas Page in a Ringside Revenge match for the NWA World Heavyweight Championship	
2	Destination X (2006)	March 12, 2006	Orlando, Florida	TNA Impact! Zone	Christian Cage (c) vs. Monty Brown for the NWA World Heavyweight Championship	
3	Destination X (2007)	March 11, 2007	Orlando, Florida	TNA Impact! Zone	Christian Cage (c) vs. Samoa Joe for the NWA World Heavyweight Championship	
4	Destination X (2008)	March 9, 2008	Norfolk, Virginia	Norfolk Scope	The Angle Alliance (Kurt Angle, A.J. Styles and Tomko) vs. The Unlikely Alliance (Christian Cage, Kevin Nash and Samoa Joe) in a six-man tag team match	
5	Destination X (2009)	March 15, 2009	Orlando, Florida	TNA Impact! Zone	Sting (c) vs. Kurt Angle for the TNA World Heavyweight Championship, with Jeff Jarrett as the special guest referee and Mick Foley as the special guest enforcer	
6	Destination X (2010)	March 21, 2010	Orlando, Florida	TNA Impact! Zone	A.J. Styles (c) vs. Abyss for the TNA World Heavyweight Championship	
7	Destination X (2011)	July 10, 2011	Orlando, Florida	Impact Zone	A.J. Styles vs. Christopher Daniels	
8	Destination X (2012)	July 8, 2012	Orlando, Florida	Impact Zone	Bobby Roode (c) vs. Austin Aries for the TNA World Heavyweight Championship	
9	Destination X (2013)	July 18, 2013	Louisville, Kentucky	Broadbent Arena	Bully Ray (c) vs. Chris Sabin for the TNA World Heavyweight Championship	
10	Destination X (2014)	July 31, 2014 (Note: The event was taped on June 26, 2014.)	New York City, New York	Grand Ballroom	Lashley (c) vs. Austin Aries for the TNA World Heavyweight Championship	
11	Destination X (2015)	June 10, 2015 (Note: The event was taped on May 11, 2015.)	Orlando, Florida	Impact Zone	Kurt Angle (c) vs. Austin Aries for the TNA World Heavyweight Championship	
12	Destination X (2016)	July 12, 2016	Orlando, Florida	Impact Zone	Lashley (c-World) vs. Eddie Edwards (c-X) for the TNA World Heavyweight Championship and the TNA X-Division Championship	
13	Destination X (2017)	August 17, 2017	Orlando, Florida	Impact Zone	Lashley vs. Matt Sydal, where the winner would receive a GFW title match of his choosing	
14	Destination X (2026)	November 15, 2026	Edmonton, Alberta, Canada	Edmonton Expo Centre	Leon Slater (c) vs. Trey Miguel for the TNA World Championship	
(c) – refers to the champion(s) heading into the match
