= Ultimate X match =

Professional wrestling match type

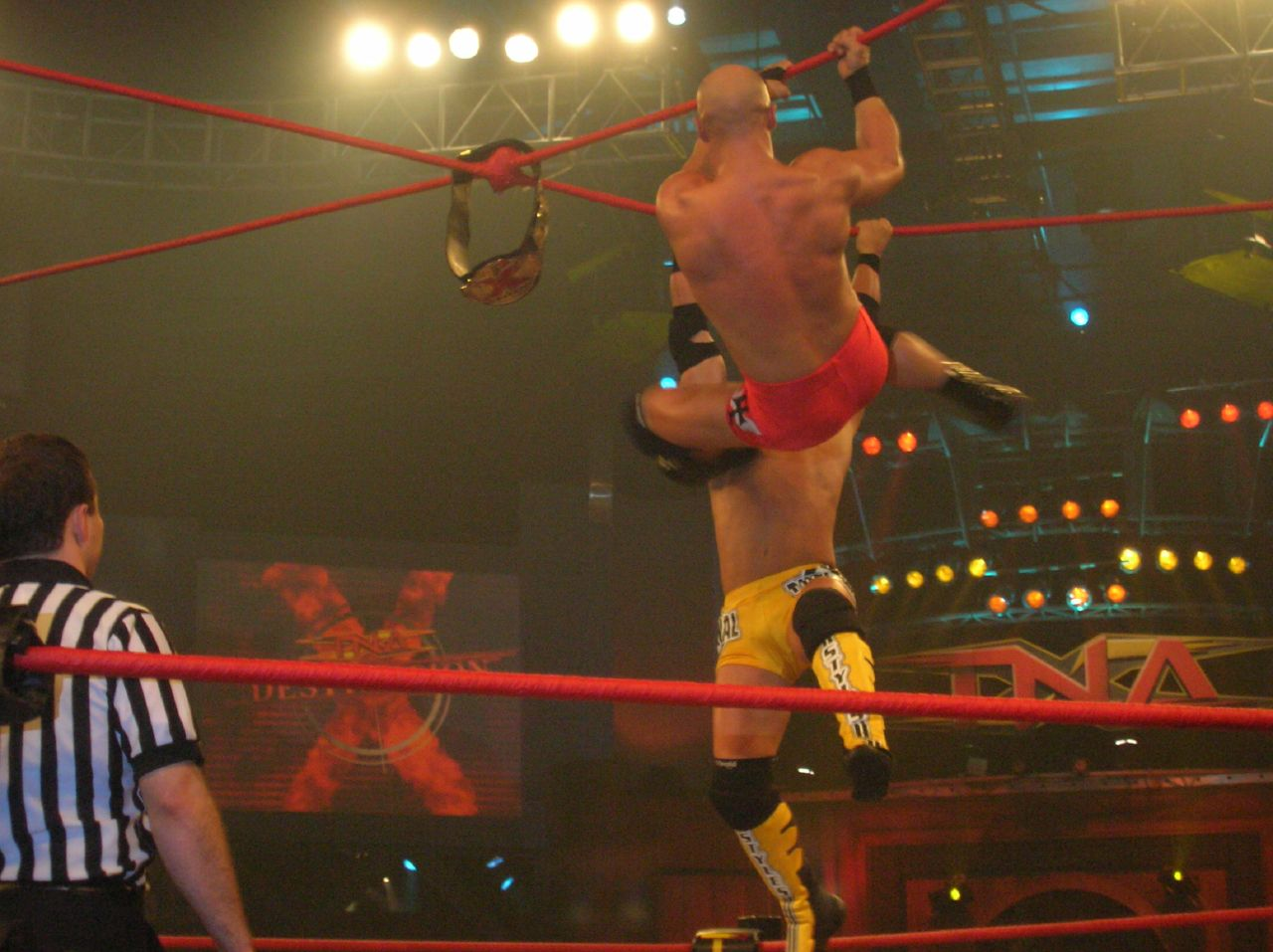
A.J. Styles and Christopher Daniels reaching for the X Division Championship during an Ultimate X match in 2006

The Ultimate X match is a type of professional wrestling match created by Total Nonstop Action Wrestling (TNA), mainly used in their X Division. It is considered the signature match of the X Division.

== Match format ==
Ultimate X is contested by three or more wrestlers of the X Division. Two cables, connected to metal structures rising from the four corners of the ring, cross 15 feet above the middle of the ring. Similar to a ladder match, an object (usually a championship belt or a large red "X") is suspended from where the cables cross. The winner is the first person to take possession of the hung object. After TNA made the transition to a hexagonal ring in June 2004, the cables were suspended from the four turnbuckles that were not perpendicular to the entrance ramp.

TNA official Don Callis received on-screen credit for the idea for the Ultimate X match. The tagline "No Limits and No Ladders" was added to the first match to emphasize the change. In this first match, bare steel wires, which were not secured in the center, were used above the ring, allowing them to bounce separately and causing the belt to tear off twice, requiring it to be reattached. In all future matches, standard wrapped ring cables were used, and the ropes were secured at their crossing. The Ultimate X match type is a match type in the TNA Impact! video game, released in September 2008.

=== Rule nuances ===
After the fourth Ultimate X match, in which Michael Shane and Kazarian pulled the X Division Championship down at the same time, it was ruled that if both combatants land on the mat while still holding the object, they are declared "co-winners". During the sixth Ultimate X, Chris Sabin and Petey Williams detached the X Division Championship at the same time when A.J. Styles jumped from the top rope to snatch the belt from them while they were still hanging from the ropes, taking sole possession and landing on the mat, winning the title.

During the seventh Ultimate X, the belt was initially pulled down by A.J. Styles; however, Christopher Daniels hit Styles with his finisher Angels Wings and took the belt away from Styles, and was declared the winner because the referee had been knocked out, and did not realize that Styles first detached the title. During the eighth Ultimate X, the object (the red "X") was partially detached, but both Chris Sabin and Michael Shane fell, and the X dropped, untouched, to the ground. Referee Mark "Slick" Johnson stopped anyone from taking the X and had officials rehang it. When it fell later, it fell into the waiting arms of Petey Williams, who was declared the winner. The decision was held up, as this was not the planned finish, and a rematch was held soon after.

Although Ultimate X matches are considered no-disqualification, interference and the use of weapons are rare. Wrestlers are not allowed to use a ladder as a way to grab the object, although technically they may use one as a weapon. In the fourteenth Ultimate X, however, Team 3D got away with using a ladder because the referee was knocked out.

=== Variations ===
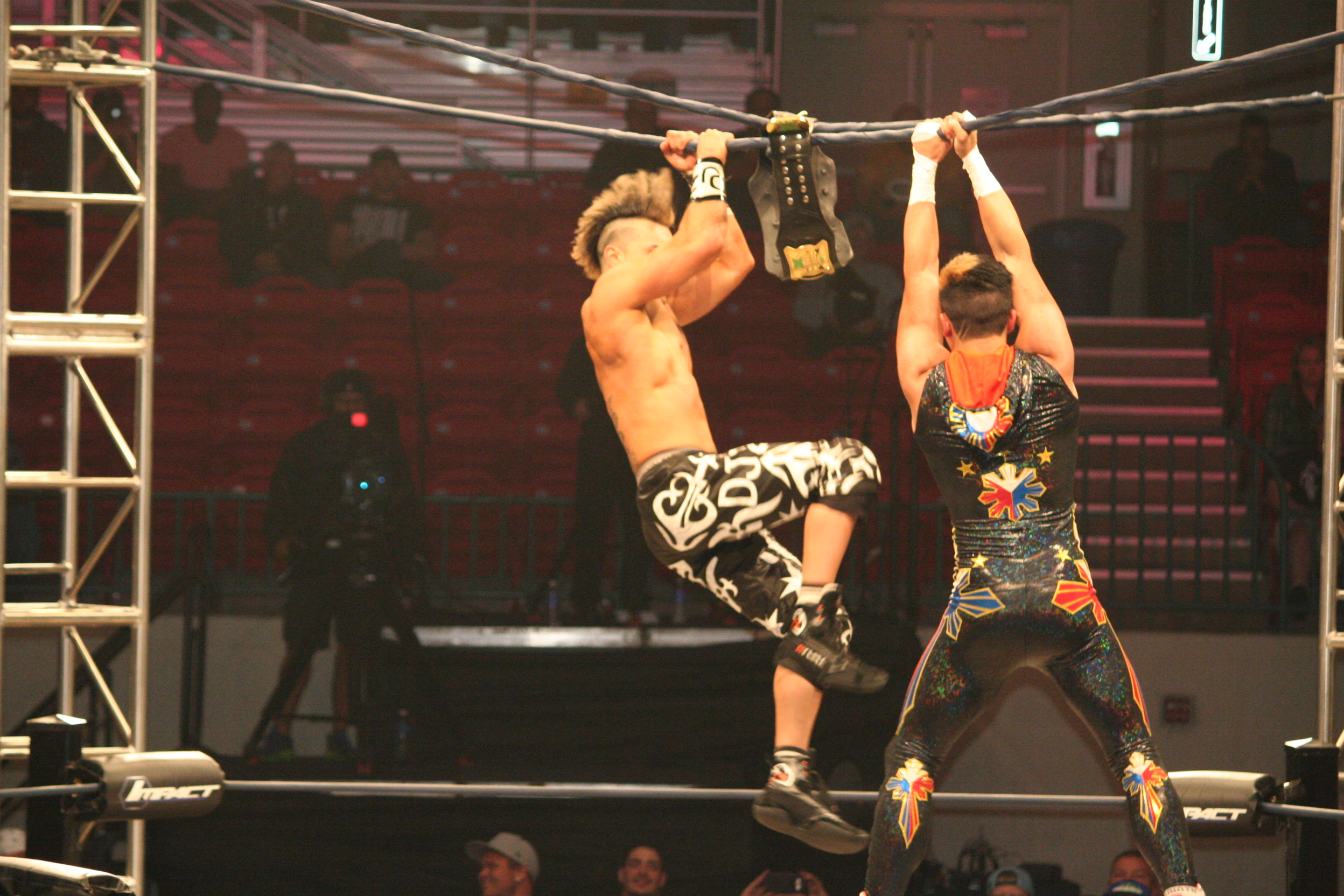
DJZ and Manik reaching for the X Division Championship during an Ultimate X match in 2015

The fourth Ultimate X was the first match of its kind to take place in a hexagonal ring. The seventh Ultimate X used a variation of the rules, called the Ultimate X Challenge. The match began under standard tag team rules, yet once a decision occurred, the wrestler who lost the decision was eliminated from the match. The remaining three competitors then wrestling under three-way dance rules to eliminate another competitor. The remaining two competitors then wrestled the Ultimate X match to determine the ultimate winner.

The eleventh match as the first tag team Ultimate X match. It was contested by two teams (for the NWA World Tag Team Championship) in a way similar to a Texas Tornado match with all four competitors attempting to obtain the object (one of the two title belts). The team of the wrestler that retrieves the belt won the match and the title. The twelfth Ultimate X was the first Ultimate X Gauntlet match. It began as a ten-man Gauntlet for the Gold, with entries at timed intervals and eliminations allowed. Elimination occurred when a competitor went over the top rope and hit the floor. After all 10 participants have entered, the wrestlers still eligible in the match attempted to obtain the object (the red "X") and win the match.

The fourteenth Ultimate X was the first six-man tag team Ultimate X match. It was held at Final Resolution 2008, pitting Team 3D and Johnny Devine against X Division Champion Jay Lethal and The Motor City Machine Guns (Alex Shelley and Chris Sabin). Team 3D broke an "unwritten rule" by using the ladder to retrieve the X Division Championship.

In 2011, the pilot episode for All Wheels Wrestling (a proposed auto racing-themed promotion filmed at TNA's Impact Zone for the Speed television network) featured an Ultimate X match as its main event, retitled as The Big Air Challenge. In this bout, Sonjay Dutt (under the ring name Schwagg D) defeated Jay Lethal (under the ring name RPM), Daivari (under the ring name Dubai), and Aaron Aguilera (under the ring name The Human Cyclone), with 20 points being awarded to the winner as part of All Wheels Wrestling's intended team competition. Of the four competitors, only Aguilera never worked for TNA or competed in an official Ultimate X match. The Big Air Challenge is not recognized as a canon Ultimate X match by Impact Wrestling.

=== Elevation X ===
Elevation X was a variant of Ultimate X that combined the standard match with a scaffold match. It took place only twice, in 2007 and 2008, both at Destination X. In the shape of giant X, the platforms were raised 15 feet above the ring. The two participants would start at the ground level, climb their way up, and finish the match there. The loser is the wrestler who falls from the scaffold into the ring below. After 2008, the match would no longer be contested due to safety concerns. Rhino has participated in and won both matches as he defeated A.J. Styles the first year and James Storm in the second and final year of the match type. After the match was scrapped, the scaffolds would be occasionally used for Ultimate X matches, especially when there was a high number of wrestlers in the match.

== Ultimate X matches ==
#	Winner(s)	Opponent(s)	Prize	Event	Date	Location	Ref
1	Michael Shane	Chris Sabin (c) and Frankie Kazarian	TNA X Division Championship	Weekly PPV #59	August 20, 2003	Nashville, TN	
2	Chris Sabin	Michael Shane (c), Christopher Daniels, and Lo-Ki	TNA X Division Championship	Weekly PPV #79	January 7, 2004	Nashville, TN	
3	Chris Sabin (Team TNA)	Hector Garza (Team Mexico) and Petey Williams (Team Canada)	5 points in the 2004 World X Cup	Weekly PPV #99: World X Cup Special	May 26, 2004	Nashville, TN	
4	Frankie Kazarian	A.J. Styles (c)	TNA X Division Championship	Weekly PPV #108	July 28, 2004	Nashville, TN	
4	Michael Shane	A.J. Styles (c)	TNA X Division Championship	Weekly PPV #108	July 28, 2004	Nashville, TN	
5	Chris Sabin	Elix Skipper and Sonjay Dutt	TNA X Division Championship match at Turning Point	The Best Damn Wrestling Event Period	October 27, 2004 (Aired November 10)	Orlando, FL	
6	A.J. Styles	Petey Williams (c) and Chris Sabin	TNA X Division Championship	Final Resolution	January 16, 2005	Orlando, FL	
7	Christopher Daniels	A.J. Styles (c), Prime Time, and Ron Killings	TNA X Division Championship	Destination X	March 13, 2005	Orlando, FL	
8	Petey Williams	Chris Sabin and Matt Bentley	TNA X Division Championship match at Genesis	Bound for Glory	October 23, 2005	Orlando, FL	
9	Petey Williams	Chris Sabin and Matt Bentley	—N/a	Impact!	October 25, 2005 (Aired November 3)	Orlando, FL	
10	Christopher Daniels	Samoa Joe (c) and A.J. Styles	TNA X Division Championship	Destination X	March 12, 2006	Orlando, FL	
11	A.J. Styles and Christopher Daniels	The Latin American Exchange (Hernandez and Homicide) (c)	NWA World Tag Team Championship	No Surrender	September 24, 2006	Orlando, FL	
12	Christopher Daniels	Elix Skipper, Homicide, Jay Lethal, Kaz, Petey Williams, Puma, Senshi, Shark Boy, and Sonjay Dutt	Future TNA X Division Championship match	Victory Road	July 15, 2007	Orlando, FL	
13	The Latin American Exchange (Hernandez and Homicide)	Triple X (Elix Skipper) and Senshi)	Future TNA World Tag Team Championship match	Bound for Glory	October 14, 2007	Atlanta, GA	
14	Johnny Devine and Team 3D (Brother Ray and Brother Devon)	Jay Lethal and Motor City Machine Guns (Alex Shelley and Chris Sabin)	—N/a	Final Resolution	January 6, 2008	Orlando, FL	
15	Volador Jr. (Team Mexico)	Daivari (Team International), Kaz (Team TNA), and Naruki Doi (Team Japan)	4 points in the 2008 World X Cup	Victory Road	July 13, 2008	Houston, TX	
16	Suicide (Note: This iteration of Suicide was played by Christopher Daniels.)	Alex Shelley (c), Chris Sabin, Consequences Creed, and Jay Lethal	TNA X Division Championship	Destination X	March 15, 2009	Orlando, FL	
17	Amazing Red (c)	Alex Shelley, Chris Sabin, Daniels, Homicide, and Suicide (Note: This iteration of Suicide was played by Frankie Kazarian.)	TNA X Division Championship	Bound for Glory	October 18, 2009	Irvine, CA	
18	Motor City Machine Guns (Alex Shelley and Chris Sabin)	Lethal Consequences (Consequences Creed and Jay Lethal)	Future TNA World Tag Team Championship match	Impact!	October 20, 2009 (Aired October 22)	Orlando, FL	
19	Douglas Williams (c)	Amazing Red, Chris Sabin, Daniels, and Suicide	TNA X Division Championship	Live event	January 30, 2010	London, England	
20	Motor City Machine Guns (Alex Shelley and Chris Sabin)	Generation Me (Jeremy Buck and Max Buck)	Future TNA World Tag Team Championship match	Destination X	March 21, 2010	Orlando, FL	
21	Douglas Williams (c)	Brian Kendrick	TNA X Division Championship	Victory Road	July 11, 2010	Orlando, FL	
22 (Note: This was the fourth match in a Best-of-five series with Beer Money, Inc. leading 2–1 before this match.)	Motor City Machine Guns (c) (Alex Shelley and Chris Sabin)	Beer Money, Inc. (James Storm and Robert Roode)	TNA World Tag Team Championship	Impact!	July 27, 2010 (Aired August 5)	Orlando, FL	
23	Kazarian	Mr. Anderson	—N/a	Impact!	October 12, 2010 (Aired October 21)	Orlando, FL	
24	Kazarian (c)	Jeremy Buck, Max Buck, and Robbie E	TNA X Division Championship	Victory Road	March 13, 2011	Orlando, FL	
25	Alex Shelley	Amazing Red, Robbie E, and Shannon Moore	Future TNA X Division Championship match	Destination X	July 10, 2011	Orlando, FL	
26	Brian Kendrick (c)	Abyss	TNA X Division Championship	Impact Wrestling	July 25, 2011 (Aired July 28)	Orlando, FL	
27	Austin Aries (c)	Chris Sabin and Zema Ion	TNA X Division Championship	Impact Wrestling	June 14, 2012	Orlando, FL	
28	Zema Ion	Kenny King, Mason Andrews, and Sonjay Dutt	Vacant TNA X Division Championship	Destination X	July 8, 2012	Orlando, FL	
29	Kenny King	Mason Andrews, Rubix, and Zema Ion	—N/a	X-Travaganza	January 12, 2013 (Aired April 5)	Orlando, FL	
30	Chris Sabin	Kenny King (c) and Suicide (Note: This iteration of Suicide was played by T. J. Perkins.)	TNA X Division Championship	Slammiversary XI	June 2, 2013	Boston, MA	
31	Manik	Greg Marasciulo and Sonjay Dutt	Vacant TNA X Division Championship	Impact Wrestling	July 18, 2013 (Aired July 25)	Louisville, KY	
32	Chris Sabin	Manik (c), Austin Aries, Jeff Hardy, and Samoa Joe	TNA X Division Championship	Bound for Glory	October 20, 2013	San Diego, CA	
33	Low Ki	Ace Vedder, Kenny King, Rashad Cameron, Sonjay Dutt, and Tigre Uno	Future TNA X Division Championship match	X-Travaganza	April 12, 2014 (Aired August 1)	Orlando, FL	
34	The Wolves (Davey Richards and Eddie Edwards)	The Revolution (The Great Sanada and Manik) and The BroMans (DJZ and Jessie Godderz)	TNA World Tag Team Championship	Impact Wrestling	January 31, 2015 (Aired March 20)	London, England	
35	Rockstar Spud	Crazzy Steve, DJ Z, Kenny King, Manik, and Tigre Uno	—N/a	X-Travaganza	February 15, 2015 (Aired May 6)	Orlando, FL	
36 (Note: This was the tournament final to crown the new TNA World Tag Team Champions.)	The Hardys (Jeff Hardy and Matt Hardy)	The Dirty Heels (Austin Aries and Bobby Roode), Bram and Ethan Carter III, and The Beat Down Clan (Kenny King and Low Ki)	Vacant TNA World Tag Team Championship	Impact Wrestling	March 14, 2015 (Aired April 17)	Orlando, FL	
37	Tigre Uno (c)	Andrew Everett, DJZ, and Manik	TNA X Division Championship	Bound for Glory	October 4, 2015	Concord, NC	
38	Trevor Lee (c)	Andrew Everett, DJZ, and Eddie Edwards	TNA X Division Championship	Impact Wrestling: May Mayhem	April 24, 2016 (Aired May 24	Orlando, FL	
39	Eddie Edwards	Mike Bennett (c), Andrew Everett, Braxton Sutter, DJZ, Mandrews, Rockstar Spud, and Trevor Lee	TNA X Division Championship	Impact Wrestling	June 15, 2016 (Aired July 5)	Orlando, FL	
40	The Helms Dynasty (Andrew Everett and Trevor Lee)	BroMans (Jessie Godderz and Robbie E)	—N/a	X-Travaganza	July 14, 2016 (Aired August 26)	Orlando, FL	
41 (Note: This was also a gauntlet match.)	DJZ	Andrew Everett, Braxton Sutter, Mandrews, Rockstar Spud, and Trevor Lee	Vacant TNA X Division Championship	Impact Wrestling	August 14, 2016 (Aired September 1)	Orlando, FL	
42	Low Ki	Andrew Everett and Trevor Lee	Impact X Division Championship	Impact Wrestling	April 22, 2017 (Aired May 18)	Orlando, FL	
43	Rich Swann	Ethan Page, Jake Crist, and Trey Miguel	Vacant Impact X Division Championship	Homecoming	January 6, 2019	Nashville, TN	
44	Johnny Impact	Ace Austin, A. R. Fox, Jake Crist, and Pat Buck	Future Impact X Division Championship match	United We Stand	April 4, 2019	Rahway, NJ	
45	Josh Alexander (c)	Ace Austin, Chris Bey, Petey Williams, Rohit Raju, and Trey Miguel	Impact X Division Championship	Slammiversary	July 17, 2021	Nashville, TN	
46	Tasha Steelz	Alisha Edwards, Chelsea Green, Jordynne Grace, Lady Frost, and Rosemary	Future Impact Knockouts Championship match	Hard To Kill	January 8, 2022	Dallas, TX	
47	Trey Miguel (c)	Blake Christian, Chris Bey, Jordynne Grace, Rich Swann, and Vincent	Impact X Division Championship	Multiverse of Matches	April 1, 2022	Dallas, TX	
48	Mike Bailey	Ace Austin (c), Alex Zayne, Andrew Everett, Kenny King and Trey Miguel	Impact X Division Championship	Slammiversary	June 19, 2022	Nashville, TN	
49	ABC (c) (Ace Austin and Chris Bey)	Motor City Machine Guns (Chris Sabin and Alex Shelley)	Impact World Tag Team Championship	Rebellion	April 16, 2023	Toronto, Ontario, Canada	
50	Kushida	Alan Angels, Jake Something, Jonathan Gresham, Kevin Knight and Mike Bailey	Future Impact X Division Championship match	Slammiversary	July 16, 2023	Windsor, Ontario, Canada	
51	Alan Angels	Ace Austin, Mike Bailey, Rich Swann, Samuray Del Sol, and Zachary Wentz	Future Impact X Division Championship match	Impact 1000	September 9, 2023 (Aired September 21)	White Plains, NY	
52	Gisele Shaw	Alisha Edwards, Dani Luna, Jody Threat, Tasha Steelz, and Xia Brookside	Future TNA Knockouts World Championship match	Hard To Kill	January 13, 2024	Las Vegas, NV	
53	Zachary Wentz	Mike Bailey (c), Hammerstone, Jason Hotch, Laredo Kid, and Riley Osborne	TNA X Division Championship	Emergence	August 30, 2024	Louisville, KY	
54	Moose (c)	KC Navarro, Leon Slater, Matt Cardona, El Hijo del Vikingo, and Sidney Akeem	TNA X Division Championship	Rebellion	April 27, 2025	Los Angeles, CA	
55	Cedric Alexander (c)	Amazing Red, Fabian Aichner, Frankie Kazarian, KC Navarro, Leon Slater, and Mr. Elegance	TNA X Division Championship	Slammiversary	June 28, 2026	Boston, MA	
56	Tasha Steelz	Heather by Elegance, Kiera Hogan, M by Elegance, Shayna Baszler, and Shotzi Blackheart	Future TNA Knockouts World Championship match	Destination X	November 15, 2026	Edmonton, Alberta, Canada	
57	KC Navarro	A. J. Francis, Cedric Alexander, Joe Alonzo, John Skyler, and TJP	Future TNA X Division Championship match	Destination X	November 15, 2026	Edmonton, Alberta, Canada	
