= X Division =

Professional wrestling genre

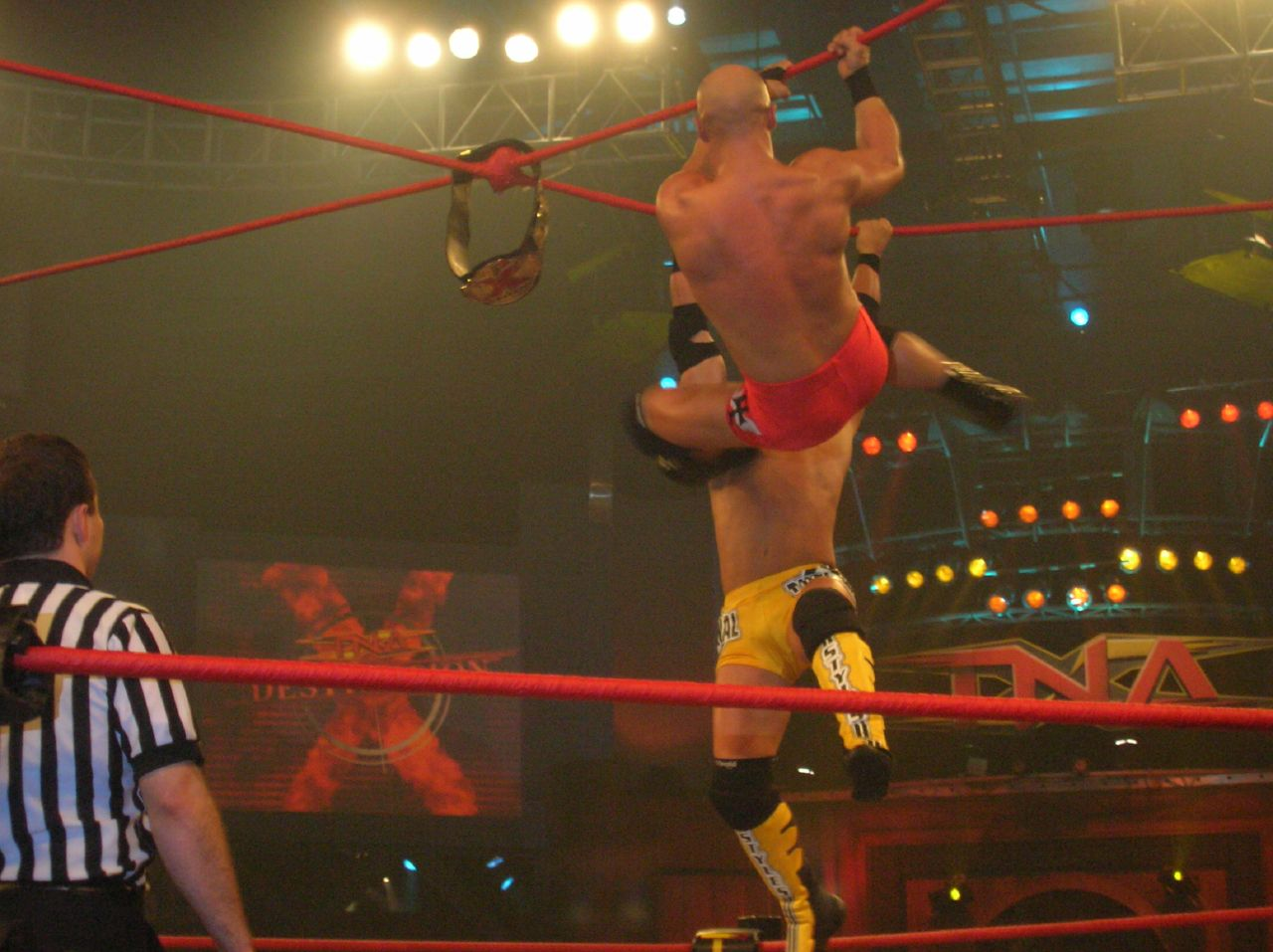
High-flying, high risk moves are a centerpiece of the X Division

The X Division is a professional wrestling division utilized by the Total Nonstop Action Wrestling (TNA) promotion and used historically in several National Wrestling Alliance (NWA) member promotions. The division is intended to emphasize a fast-paced and acrobatic style of wrestling, with most of the division's stars being cruiserweights. However, for most of its history, it has not featured strict weight limits. Wrestlers in TNA's division compete for the TNA X Division Championship (originally the NWA X Championship).

Throughout the 2000s, the X Division was one of TNA's main attractions, featuring wrestlers such as AJ Styles and Samoa Joe. Later, the X Division would be deemphasized in favor of the promotion's main heavyweight division.

== Overview ==
The high-flying, high risk style of wrestling had become one of the features of World Championship Wrestling and Extreme Championship Wrestling in the late 1990s. Rather than emphasizing the fact that most wrestlers who perform this style are under 220 lb (100 kg) by calling it a cruiserweight division, Total Nonstop Action Wrestling (TNA) decided to emphasize the high-risk nature of the stunt like moves that the wrestlers performed only in TNA where no restraints were placed on them. As such, according to TNA co-founder Bob Ryder in The History of TNA: Year 1, they named the division after the X Games.

Until 2011, there was no upper weight limit on the X Division or its title, though in practice, most of the wrestlers in this division were cruiserweights, with Sonny Siaki, Samoa Joe, Kurt Angle, and Abyss being notable exceptions. To further emphasize this point, the slogan "It's not about weight limits, it's about no limits" was used to describe the division. On the August 11, 2011, edition of Impact Wrestling, TNA authority figure Eric Bischoff announced that X Division would have a weight limit of 225 lb (102 kg). However, when Hulk Hogan became the new on screen GM in March 2012, the weight limit was quietly repealed, as heavier wrestlers like former champion Samoa Joe and eventual champion Rob Van Dam were able to compete for the title.

On the March 21, 2013, episode of Impact Wrestling, new rules were implemented for the X Division:

1. A 230 lb. weight limit
2. All matches will be triple threat matches
3. In championship matches, whoever gets pinned or is made to submit would be ineligible for the next championship match, while the one who does not will be a challenger for the next X Division match.

On the April 18, 2013, episode of Impact Wrestling, a new feature called the X Cam was introduced, giving viewers a first-person look at every X Division match.

On the August 22, 2013, episode of Impact Wrestling, it was announced that the triple threat match rule had been revoked and that X Division matches may also be contested under one on one matches again.

On October 20, 2013, at Bound for Glory, 280 lb. Samoa Joe took part in a five-man Ultimate X match for the X Division Championship. This indicated that the 230 lb. weight limit was also quietly revoked.

== Reception ==
The X Division is generally regarded as one of the key attractions of TNA. A 2005 X Division Championship three-way match between Christopher Daniels, Samoa Joe and A.J. Styles at Unbreakable was given the rare rating of 5 stars by the Wrestling Observer.

== Tournaments ==
=== X Cup Tournaments ===
TNA maintains three different styles of tournament referred to as "X Cup" tournaments. The Super X Cup tournament is a standard single-elimination tournament featuring one-on-one matches. The Americas X Cup tournament was a team-format points-based tournament featuring two teams of four wrestlers each, with each team representing a respective country that most or all of the wrestlers are from. Members of the team competed in a variety of matches, including singles matches and tag team matches, which accrued points for their side. The World X Cup tournament was an expansion on the Americas X Cup, in which four teams of four wrestlers competed. In the World X Cup, TNA always hosts a home team for the United States, with other countries such as Japan, Mexico, and Canada being represented by either TNA-contracted wrestlers or wrestlers from a promotion that TNA has a partnership agreement with.

X Division wrestlers are generally the only TNA wrestlers that compete in the TNA X Cup Tournaments. The first such tournament was the TNA 2003 Super X Cup Tournament, which was won by Chris Sabin.

=== TNA X Division Championship Tournament (2009) ===
The tournament was the result of a match for the TNA X Division Championship at Final Resolution between Eric Young and Sheik Abdul Bashir ending in a controversial fashion, with Young winning the championship thanks to the referee's help. Management Director Jim Cornette stripped Young of the belt and announced the tournament to crown the new champion. The tournament final took place at Genesis.

Quarterfinals (TV - TNA Impact!)
Eric Young	Pin
Sheik Abdul Bashir
Alex Shelley	Pin
Jay Lethal
Chris Sabin	Pin
Sonjay Dutt
Consequences Creed
Kiyoshi	Pin

Semifinals (TV - TNA Impact!)
Eric Young
Alex Shelley	Pin
Chris Sabin	Pin
Kiyoshi

Final (PPV - Genesis)
Alex Shelley	Pin
Chris Sabin	16:38

=== TNA X Division Championship #1 Contender Tournament (2011) ===
On the January 27, 2011, edition of Impact!, TNA started a tournament to determine a new number one contender for the TNA X Division Championship, held by Kazarian. The tournament consisted of three three–way semifinal matches, taking place on the January 27, February 3 and February 10 editions of Impact!, with the finals, another three-way match, taking place at Against All Odds on February 13. The finals ended with a double countout, after Jeremy and Max Buck failed to make it to the event due to travel issues.

=== X Division Showcase (2011) ===
On the June 16, 2011, edition of Impact Wrestling, TNA started a twelve-man tournament for a contract in the promotion's X Division. The finals of the tournament would take place on July 10 at Destination X.

First round

- Austin Aries defeated Jimmy Rave and Kid Kash (Impact Wrestling, June 16, 2011)
- Zema Ion defeated Dakota Darsow and Federico Palacios (Impact Wrestling, June 23, 2011)
- Low Ki defeated Jimmy Yang and Matt Bentley (Impact Wrestling, June 30, 2011)
- Jack Evans defeated Jesse Sorensen and Tony Nese (Impact Wrestling, July 7, 2011)

Finals

- Austin Aries defeated Jack Evans, Low Ki and Zema Ion (Destination X, July 10, 2011)

=== TNA X Division Championship Tournament (2012) ===
On the June 28, 2012, episode of Impact Wrestling, TNA announced a tournament for the TNA X Division Championship, which would take place at Destination X, where Austin Aries would vacate the title for a shot at the TNA World Heavyweight Championship. The tournament was preceded by four qualifying matches featuring wrestlers from the independent circuit. TNA contracted wrestlers Douglas Williams, Kid Kash and Zema Ion were given automatic spots in the first round of the tournament. The eighth and final spot in the tournament would be filled by the winner of a four-way between the losers of the qualifying matches. At Destination X the eight wrestlers will face each other in four singles matches, with the winners advancing to an Ultimate X match for the X Division Championship.

Qualifiers
Sonjay Dutt	Pin
Rubix
Rashad Cameron	Pin
Mason Andrews
Flip Cassanova	Pin
Dakota Darsow
Zema Ion	BYE
–	–
Kenny King	Pin
Lars Only
Douglas Williams	BYE
–	–
Mason Andrews	Pin
Dakota Darsow, Lars Only, and Rubix
Kid Kash	BYE
–	–

Semifinals
Sonjay Dutt
Rashad Cameron	Pin
Flip Cassanova	Pin
Zema Ion
Kenny King	Pin
Douglas Williams
Mason Andrews	Pin
Kid Kash

Finalists
Sonjay Dutt
Zema Ion
Kenny King
Mason Andrews

Finals
Zema Ion	Win
Sonjay Dutt, Kenny King, and Mason Andrews

=== TNA X Division Championship #1 Contender Tournament (2013) ===
On the January 3, 2013, edition of Impact! TNA started a tournament to determine a new number one contender for the TNA X Division Championship, held by Rob Van Dam. The tournament consisted of two singles semifinal matches, taking place on the January 3 and January 10 editions of Impact!, with the finals taking place at Genesis on January 13.

=== TNA X Division Championship Tournament (2013) ===
On the Destination X edition of Impact! TNA started a tournament to determine a new TNA X Division Champion, since the title was vacated after Chris Sabin traded it in for a shot at the World Championship. The tournament consisted of three three–way semifinal matches, taking place on the July 18 edition of Impact!, with the finals, another three-way match, taking place on July 25, 2013.

Semifinals
Sonjay Dutt
Homicide
Petey Williams
Manik
Chavo Guerrero Jr.
Kenny King

Finals
Sonjay Dutt
Manik
Greg Marasciulo

=== TNA X Division Championship Tournament (2014) ===
On the Destination X edition of Impact! TNA started a tournament to determine a new TNA X Division Champion, since the title was vacated after Austin Aries traded it in for a shot at the World Championship. The tournament consisted of three three–way semifinal matches, taking place on the July 31 edition of Impact!, with the finals, another three-way match, taking place on August 7, 2014.

Semifinals
Low-Ki
ManikZema Ion
Zema Ion
Brian Cage
Crazzy Steve
Sanada
Samoa Joe
Homicide
Tigre Uno

Finals
Low-Ki
Sanada
Samoa Joe

=== TNA X Division Championship Tournament (2015) ===
On the Destination X 2015 edition of Impact! TNA started a tournament to determine a new TNA X Division Champion, since the title was vacated after Rockstar Spud traded it in for a shot at the World Championship. The tournament consisted of three three–way semifinal matches, taking place on the June 10th edition of Impact!, with the finals, another three-way match, taking place on June 27, 2015.

Semifinals
Low-Ki
Crazzy Steve
Manik
Grado
Cruz
Kenny King

Finals
Low-Ki
Grado
Tigre Uno

=== Impact X Division Championship Tournament (2021) ===
On the September 23 episode of Impact!, Impact started a tournament to determine the new Impact X Division Champion, since the title was vacated after Josh Alexander invoked Option C to challenge for the Impact World Championship. The tournament consist of three three–way semi-final matches, with the finals, another three-way match, will taking place at Bound for Glory.

First round Impact! (September 30, 2021 – October 14, 2021)
8:41	Alex Zayne
Laredo Kid
Pin	Trey Miguel
7:12	Black Taurus
Petey Williams
Pin	Steve Maclin
Pin	El Phantasmo
9:38	Willie Mack
Rohit Raju

Final; Bound for Glory (October 23, 2021)
Pin	Trey Miguel
13:21	Steve Maclin
El Phantasmo

=== Impact X Division Championship Tournament (2022) ===
On October 20, 2022, after Frankie Kazarian vacated the Impact X Division Championship for a shot at the Impact World Championship it was announced that there will be an eight-man tournament to determine who will be the new Impact X Division Champion on November 18, 2022, at Impact Pay-per-view Over Drive.

Quarterfinals; Impact! Before the Impact; October 21, 2022 (aired October 27 and November 3, 2022)
Black Taurus	Pin
Laredo Kid	8:05
Yuya Uemura	8:33
PJ Black	Pin
Alan Angels	8:17
Trey Miguel	Pin
Kenny King	8:44
Mike Bailey	Pin

Semifinals; Impact! October 22, 2022 (aired November 10 and 17, 2022)
Black Taurus	Pin
PJ Black	6:19
Trey Miguel	DQ
Mike Bailey	7:02

Final; Over Drive (November 18, 2022)
Black Taurus	15:50
Trey Miguel	Pin

== Ultimate X Match ==
The Ultimate X match is the signature gimmick match of the X Division. It is similar to a ladder match except that two cables attached to truss towers adjacent to the ring posts cross above the center of the ring and the item of value is hung at the intersection of the cables. The winner is the competitor who can retrieve the item of value from the cables.

It was originally created in August 2003 and pitted Michael Shane, Frankie Kazarian, and Chris Sabin. Since then, twenty-four Ultimate X matches have taken place, some for the X Division championship, some for the TNA World Tag Team Championship, and some with a giant red X suspended above the ring symbolizing something such as number one contender status, and even the X Division title itself.

== See also ==
- Destination X
- Gauntlet for the Gold
