= Destination X (2011) =

TNA professional wrestling event

- Promotional poster featuring TNA's Six Sided Ring
- Promotion: Total Nonstop Action Wrestling (TNA)
- Date: July 10, 2011
- City: Orlando, Florida
- Venue: Impact Zone
- Attendance: 1,100
- Tagline: Forward To The Past

Pay-per-view chronology
← Previous; Slammiversary IX	Next → Hardcore Justice

Destination X chronology
← Previous; 2010	Next → 2012

The 2011 Destination X was a professional wrestling pay-per-view (PPV) event produced by the Total Nonstop Action Wrestling (TNA) promotion, which took place on July 10, 2011, at the Impact Wrestling Zone in Orlando, Florida. Destination X was promoted with the tagline "Forward to the Past", as an all X Division event to commemorate the division that helped pave the way for the company long-term by bringing in popularity with its extraordinary athletic showcases. It was the seventh event under the Destination X chronology—first to be held in July—and the seventh event of the 2011 TNA PPV schedule.

The main event on the card featured two pioneers of the X Division in a battle, where A.J. Styles took on Christopher Daniels, which Styles won after hitting the Spiral Tap, a reference of his victory at the second TNA weekly PPV, where he became the first-ever TNA X Division Champion. The other main match on the card was Abyss defending the X Division Title against Brian Kendrick in a match that Kendrick prevailed in following a roll up. Other matches on the undercard included a Four Way X Division Showcase tournament final match for an exclusive TNA contract as Austin Aries defeated Jack Evans, Low Ki and Zema Ion, Rob Van Dam defeating Jerry Lynn, and an Ultimate X match, where Alex Shelley defeated Amazing Red, Robbie E and Shannon Moore to become contender to the X Division Title.

The event was mostly received positively by wrestling critics. It was rated 8 out of 10 by Canadian Online Explorer's pro wrestling section, SLAM! Sports.

In October 2017, with the launch of the Global Wrestling Network, the event became available to stream on demand.

== Production ==
=== Background ===
The seventh installment in the Destination X chronology was originally planned to take place on March 13, 2011 at the TNA Impact! Zone in Orlando, Florida. However, in early January 2011 TNA switched the planned date for their Victory Road PPV event with Destination X. Causing Victory Road to take place on March 13 and Destination to be slated for July 17. Destination X was then moved again to July 10. To promote the event, TNA released a promotional poster featuring the tagline "Forward to the Past," featuring the signature six-sided ring once used by TNA, and was used again for this event.

=== Storylines ===
Destination X featured eight professional wrestling matches that involved different wrestlers from pre-existing scripted feuds and storylines. Wrestlers portrayed villains, heroes, or less distinguishable characters in the scripted events that built tension and culminated in a wrestling match or series of matches.

The main feud on the card was between Abyss and Brian Kendrick over the TNA X Division Championship. On the May 19 edition of Impact Wrestling, during Eric Bischoff's agenda to eradicate the X Division, Abyss defeated the reigning champion Kazarian to win the title, effectively setting the plan in motion. With the X Division progressively being sidetracked, and even humiliated by Bischoff, Kendrick led a pack of X Division stars to fight for the survival of the division and get revenge against Bischoff and Immortal. At Slammiversary IX, Kendrick competed in a Three Way match with former champion Kazarian and Abyss over the title, but lost to Abyss. However, Kendrick was granted another match with Abyss when "The Network" decided that the Destination X pay-per-view would solely focus on the X Division. On the June 30 edition of Impact, Abyss, much in panic mode, discovered that his mask had been stolen backstage, setting off in a frantic search for it in his locker room. The next week, Kendrick revealed he had thieved the mask, claiming Abyss' ego hindered him from aiding the X-Division, but truly wore the mask to conceal his pain within. He pledged to help Abyss rid his ego and fulfill his potential, though his mission was to beat him for the X-Division Title. Kendrick then returned the mask to make a settlement with Abyss, who attacked him for his troubles.

On the June 23 edition of Impact, A.J. Styles announced that, in accordance with the theme for the Destination X event, he was "coming home" to the X Division, a legacy he helped pioneer (as the first-ever X Division Champion) and which brought the company to the forefront in its early years. He also teased the return of the six-sided ring. Interrupted by Samoa Joe, who boastfully laid claim to his accolades including having defeated Styles many times, this eventually brought out his best friend and Fortune ally Christopher Daniels, who suggested a match with Styles, and unexpectedly left out Joe. The following week, though Styles was slightly skeptical of Daniels wanting the match, Styles and Daniels signed the contract to make their match official at Destination X, agreeing to not let the competition stand in the way of their friendship.

Left out of the Destination X match with Styles and Daniels, Joe encountered Kazarian backstage, who was engaging in a discussion with Daniels about the situation. Joe ridiculed Kazarian for inquiring about the predicament, calling him the "Real Housewife of Fortune", which ended up igniting a feud after Kazarian insulted him, and for his actions, was ultimately assaulted by Joe.

On the June 23 edition of Impact, Rob Van Dam appeared in a backstage segment and pitched himself in on Destination X, proclaiming he was X Division before there was an actual division, referring to his prominent days in Extreme Championship Wrestling. His longtime rival and a pioneer of the X Division himself, Jerry Lynn, abruptly emerged and reminded him that it was the two of them in which carried the style back then. This signified the possibility of another match between them, which was supposed to have transpired at Hardcore Justice the year prior, but due to sustaining a back injury before the match, Lynn was forced to pull out and was replaced by Sabu. Lynn and Van Dam later crashed the contract signing between Styles and Daniels, where they decided to rekindle their rivalry once and for all at Destination X.

For the four weeks leading up to Destination X, there had been a 12-man tournament consisting of a series of four Three Way matches. Two of these matches included stars from the X Division's past, while the other two included all newcomers participating in tourney. The winners of these matches would advance to a four-way match at Destination X and the winner at the event, would receive a TNA contract. Austin Aries won the first match defeating Jimmy Rave and Kid Kash. The following week, Zema Ion won the second match against Federico Palacios and Dakota Darsow. The week after that, Low Ki won his match beating Matt Bentley and Jimmy Yang. On the final Impact before Destination X, Jack Evans won the final match against Tony Nese and Jesse Sorensen.

One of the staples of the X Division is the Ultimate X match. Four wrestlers from the division were chosen by TNA management to compete in an Ultimate X match after Mick Foley announced the match for the show many weeks before. The wrestlers chosen were Alex Shelley, Robbie E, Shannon Moore, and Amazing Red.

Former X Division Champion Douglas Williams announced an open challenge at the show via Twitter. On the July 7 edition of Impact, Williams made it official by publicly laying out the challenge.

== Events ==
Other on-screen personnel
Commentators	Mike Tenay
Commentators	Jeremy Borash
Ring announcer	Christy Hemme
Referees	Rudy Charles
Referees	Mark "Slick" Johnson
Referees	Andrew Thomas
Interviewer	Jeremy Borash

=== Preliminary matches ===
At the start of the event, commentator Mike Tenay announced that Taz was on assignment and taking his place would be Jeremy Borash. The opening match to set the night off at Destination X was Samoa Joe going up against Kazarian. Kazarian tried to take an early advantage but Joe began dominating the match with a mean streak against Kazarian and his comeback efforts. The match spilled to the outside early, Joe in control, before it shortly returned inside the ring. Kazarian maintained a brief period turning the momentum. However, Joe did not let up on his dominance. During the match, Joe failed twice to apply his signature rear naked choke, but succeeded in his third trial though Kazarian did not submit. Towards the end of the match, Joe argued with the referee after having to break off the choke, and this allowed a resilient Kazarian to recover, counter another attempted choke and roll up Joe out of nowhere for the victory.

Before the second match, Douglas Williams came out accompanied by Rob Terry and Magnus. With the mystery for William's opponent in his open challenge up in the air, it was revealed as debuting UK wrestler Mark Haskins, who was scouted during his involvement in TNA's UK Tour early in the year. Williams showed respect for Haskins and his abilities, but claimed Haskins was not better than him and exploited his inexperience factor of not having competed on live PPV. In the match, Williams, confident, matched technical prowess with Haskins, retreating from the ring to regroup after almost pinned in a series of pin attempts between them. Williams gradually got back in control for a period, mostly going back-and-forth with Haskins. Down in the end, Williams ultimately won the match with a roll up following Haskins' missed shooting star press.

Some time before the next match, which was scheduled at the event, Eric Young appeared in a backstage segment recorded just before the event began, looking for a tag team partner at a table behind which stationed Suicide, Curry Man, and Sangriento. With none of them offering to be his partner for various reasons, in a surprise appearance, Shark Boy showed up and accepted the position. After Generation Me's entrance to the ring, it became evident that they were competing against Young and Shark Boy. To start the match, Young and Shark Boy played their games, stalling over who should begin as the legal man. Eventually, Shark Boy and Jeremy Buck go at it first. The match sees much back and forth action. Young and Max Buck are in next and the balanced competitiveness continues — Young using his more comical approaches and Max moving quick for his executions. In the end, Generation Me tried to set up a top rope move on Young, but Shark Boy made the save by pushing Jeremy off the top rope, giving the Chummer to Max and Young following up with the Youngblood Neckbreaker and the pinfall victory.

The next match was the Ultimate X match for contention to the TNA X Division Championship between Alex Shelley, Robbie E, Amazing Red and Shannon Moore. Moore had his way with everyone in the early goings and attempted to climb for the 'X' but Red stops him and fights him off prior to going at it with Shelley. Meanwhile, Robbie pursued the 'X' and wasn't able to keep himself hanging from the ropes attached to the structure. Red soon found himself at an advantage point and tried to climb for the 'X' but Shelley ceased his efforts. Red, Shelley, and Robbie do combat in the ring corner and Robbie gets sent to the floor before Shelley works Red over. Moore started climbing but was stopped by Shelley. When Robbie returned, all three fought and Shelley prevailed and attempted to climb only to be halted by Red. However, Shelley overcame Red and knocked him to the apron leaving Robbie to be the one pulling him off the ropes. Red and Robbie had exchanges and Robbie got the better of the situation. From there, he knocked Moore off the apron and baseball slid him under the bottom rope, where Moore trapped him in the apron cover, leveling him with forearms. Shelley flew over the ropes shoving Moore into Robbie, but Moore ended back on the apron and hit a moonsault back onto Shelley. The action continued with the momentum constantly shifting. Robbie scaled for the ‘X’ but Red put a stoppage to it and scored a few spinning kicks. Robbie whipped Red to the ropes, and he flew over taking out Moore and Shelley. When Robbie tried to climb again, Red hit a springboard dropkick in the ring dropping Robbie out of the air and onto the canvas. Towards the match's conclusion, Moore climbed the structure to the top. Red climbed the ropes for the ‘X’, however, Moore dropped down from the structure onto the‘X’ to kick Red off of it and retrieve the ‘X’, but Shelley, who had started climbing, wrapped his feet around the ropes and slid down on it, kicking Moore off and successfully unhooking the ‘X’ and falling to the mat to get the victory. After the match, Chris Sabin came out to congratulate Shelley.

Rob Van Dam revisited his history in a match with his longtime wrestling rival Jerry Lynn. The match initially stalled and before it began, the two opponents showcased a display of sportsmanship. When it started, Van Dam and Lynn locked up, and after an athletic display and rope running, no one took the lead. That was until Van Dam swept the legs of Lynn knocking him down to the mat and began working over his left arm. Lynn fought back and proved the two knew each other well as the match came down to 50/50 between them. Lynn got frustrated and implemented a strategy to turn the match in his favor by advantageously tossing Van Dam out of the ring during a handshake. Lynn led the way, baseball sliding and front flipping on Van Dam outside the ring and back in the ring, following up with keeping him grounded, despite short defensive comebacks by Van Dam. Eventually, Van Dam was able to attain control, and in one highlight, spin kicked Lynn hanging across the ringside guardrail. The match continued back-and-forth and down in the end, Lynn impressed with two creative chair spots, one which drew blood from Van Dam. But after Van Dam kicked a chair in Lynn's face, he nailed the Five-Star Frog Splash and covered to win the match.

The Four Way X Division Showcase tournament final match for an exclusive TNA contract was next featuring competitors Austin Aries, Jack Evans, Low Ki and Zema Ion. In the inception, Aries tried to go after Evans, who was targeted by Low Ki, thus, Aries went after Ion and tried to win the match early by pinning him to no success. Low Ki confronted Aries and gave in to his offered handshake, but used the opportunity to deliver a stiff kick. Aries and Low Ki battled it out and Low Ki prevailed during their scuffle and forced Aries out the ring. Everyone in the ring took turns shining in the match. Soon, Aries returned to the ring dominating all his opponents shortly before Evans, Low Ki, and Ion all hit him with a dropkick at the same time, making Aries leave the ring. Many creative and highly athletic moves, strong physicality, countless near falls were seen in the match in its progression. At the end, Aries slammed Low Ki down with the brainbuster to secure a pinfall victory and claim the contract.

=== Main Event matches ===
The following match prior to the main event was Abyss defending the TNA X Division Championship as he faced Brian Kendrick. Kendrick refused to shy away from the odds in front of him, kicking at Abyss, who was not fazed in the least, in the beginning of the match. As the much bigger man, Abyss dominated the early portion of the bout, hitting and beating on Kendrick, though Kendrick tried his best to put up a fight. Abyss got distracted looking at his book for inspiration on Sun Tzu's Art of War philosophy and this was costly when Kendrick landed a punch that caused him to bleed from the eyebrow. Kendrick used his fast pace to take it to Abyss until Abyss cut him off with the Shock Treatment. Kendrick, however, got a shoulder up during the ensuing pinfall. Abyss argued with referee Earl Hebner, who then was knocked unconscious when Abyss whipped Kendrick to the ring corner as Kendrick prevented a collision with Hebner, but moved out the way when Abyss stormed in for body contact. Kendrick connected with a Sliced Bread #2 and pinned Abyss, but there was no referee in sight. Nearing the end of the match, Eric Bischoff came down to the ring to argue with Kendrick, who laid him out from a punch. Immortal members Gunner, Bully Ray and Scott Steiner came out next to beat down Kendrick. Fellow X Division members Generation Me, Shark Boy and Amazing Red tried to make the save, but Immortal took care of them. Moreover, further back up arrived in Austin Aries, Eric Young, Shannon Moore, Douglas Williams, Robbie E, and Alex Shelley to drive Immortal out. In the final moments, Kendrick went for a move off the top rope, Abyss countered and went in for the kill with a chokeslam but Kendrick reversed it and rolled Abyss up. At first there was no referee, but then a revived Hebner proceeded to perform a three count as Kendrick won his first X Division Championship. After the match, X Division stars helped Kendrick celebrate the moment while red confetti descended from the rafters and Eric Bischoff and Immortal were upset. Abyss also appeared to have a fallout with Bully Ray.

The main event of the night was two best friends and pioneers of the X Division competing as A.J. Styles went head to head with Christopher Daniels. Styles and Daniels set the pace in the beginning stages, putting on a technical exhibition and contending in a series of chain wrestling executions. They also proved to know each other well by anticipating particular moves in certain situations. There were several near falls and counters seen in the match, and in the early portion, Styles had control and continuously worked on the left arm of Daniels. Gradually, Daniels changed his game plan when Styles exited the ring to take a breather, and instead of waiting on him to completely face his direction, launched out on Styles with a suicide dive just as he spun around, and followed up with a second when Styles got to a vertical base. Thereafter, the momentum went to Daniels, who put Styles in the ring and hit Back Suplexes and other moves to affect his neck and carry out his plan of working over that area on Styles. It wasn't until Daniels was going to conduct a move off the ropes that Styles turned the match back in his favor, pushing Daniels off and landing a slingshot crossbody onto him. However, Styles gained control briefly until his flying forearm smash attempt backfired when Daniels knocked him off the ropes to the outside. Back in the ring, as Styles fought back, Daniels applied the Koji Clutch and Styles was able to get the rope break. Down to the end of the match, Styles and Daniels continued to trade offense and countered multiple times including each other's signature moves, but delivered their finishing moves which only led to two counts during pins. Daniels also let his frustration get the better of him. At the very end, while both were on the top rope, Styles backdropped Daniels, who attempted the Angel's Wings from that height, and Styles hit the Spiral Tap, and covered for the victory.

== Aftermath ==
After the highly acclaimed success garnered for the delivery of Destination X, TNA officially announced the signing of Austin Aries, who won his Four Way X Division Showcase tournament final match for an exclusive contract at the event against hopefuls Low Ki, Zema Ion and Jack Evans during a match where fans voiced a chant that the company should "sign them all", a chant which trended worldwide as "#SignThemAll" on Twitter. TNA Vice President of Talent Relations, Bruce Prichard, believed Aries offered an exceptional and fierce style which he saw beneficial to the X Division as well as "an arrogance and a confidence backed by tremendous physical ability". Due to the tournament performances on Impact Wrestling leading up to and at the pay per view, Prichard said several other upcoming talents would be signed to the X Division roster in reinvigorating the division. Prichard finished by saying, "Our goal now is to reinvent and redefine the X-Division as something unique to all of pro wrestling".

On the Impact Wrestling episode following Destination X, Austin Aries defeated Shannon Moore with the help of a chain. Alex Shelley ran down to the ring to complain to him about cheating to win the match, though Aries ultimately seemed to ignore him. The next week, Shelley, having won the Ultimate X match that rewarded him the opportunity, was set to take on defending champion Brian Kendrick for the TNA X Division Championship. During the match, Aries began a feud with Shelley by costing him his title match when he ran out to the ring and hit Shelley in the head with the X Division Title, unbeknownst to the referee, Shelley and Kendrick, as Aries hid under the ring.

== Reception ==
Destination X received mostly positive reviews. Bob Kapur, a writer for the Canadian Online Explorer on its pro wrestling section, rated the event an 8 out of 10, stating that "the spotlight was once again on the X-Division, and the result was a solid and refreshing show that lived up to the company's "Wrestling matters" slogan". Kapur also went on the rate all of the matches between 7 and 9 out of 10 including the main events of the X-Division Championship match giving it 7 out of 10 and AJ Styles versus Christopher Daniels giving it 9 out of 10. Also notable, the undercard Contract match was scored 9 out of 10.

411 Mania pro wrestling section writer Colin Rinehart reviewed the show saying, "Probably the best and most consistent offering on PPV from TNA so far this year, and a potential candidate for PPV of the year for the company most likely by the time the end of the year rolls around. Almost everyone delivered here and while a few matches were a tad bit underwhelming based on pre-show expectations, the overall bulk of the show consisted of highly entertaining, hard fought contests showing off some of the best "X-Division" style talent in the world today. An easy and enthusiastic thumbs up here for Destination X".

== Results ==
No.	Results	Stipulations	Times
1	Kazarian defeated Samoa Joe	Singles match	11:19
2	Douglas Williams (with Magnus and Rob Terry) defeated Mark Haskins	Open Challenge match	07:40
3	Eric Young and Shark Boy defeated Generation Me (Jeremy Buck and Max Buck)	Tag team match	07:22
4	Alex Shelley defeated Amazing Red, Robbie E (with Cookie) and Shannon Moore	Ultimate X match to determine the #1 contender for the TNA X Division Championship	10:30
5	Rob Van Dam defeated Jerry Lynn	Singles match	16:51
6	Austin Aries defeated Jack Evans, Low Ki and Zema Ion	Four-way X Division Showcase tournament final for an exclusive TNA contract	13:30
7	Brian Kendrick defeated Abyss (c)	Singles match for the TNA X Division Championship; If Abyss had won the X Division would have changed its name to Xtreme and become a hardcore division	10:39
8	A.J. Styles defeated Christopher Daniels	Singles match	28:27
(c) / – the champion(s) heading into the match

== See also ==
- TripleMania XIX
