= TNA X Division Championship =

Men's professional wrestling championship

- The current TNA X Division Championship belt

Details
- Promotion: Total Nonstop Action Wrestling
- Date established: June 19, 2002
- Current champion: Amazing Red
- Date won: October 11, 2026

Other names
- NWA X Championship (2002); NWA–TNA X Championship (2002); NWA–TNA X Division Championship (2003); TNA X Division Championship (2003–2017, 2024–present); Impact Wrestling X Division Championship (2017); GFW X Division Championship (2017); Impact X Division Championship (2017–2024)
Statistics
- First champion: A.J. Styles
- Most reigns: Chris Sabin (10 reigns)
- Longest reign: 298 days: Austin Aries; Leon Slater
- Shortest reign: <1 day: Eric Young; Chris Sabin; Rockstar Spud; Leon Slater
- Oldest champion: Frankie Kazarian (45 years, 64 days)
- Youngest champion: Leon Slater (20 years, 296 days)
- Heaviest champion: Abyss (350 lbs)
- Lightest champion: Rockstar Spud (140 lbs)

The TNA X Division Championship is a men's professional wrestling championship created and promoted by Total Nonstop Action Wrestling (TNA). It debuted on June 19, 2002, at the taping of TNA's second then-weekly pay-per-view (PPV) event. The current champion is Amazing Red in his fourth reign. He won the vacant title by defeating BDE, Cedric Alexander, Fabian Aichner, KC Navarro, Rich Swann, and Ryan Nemeth in a seven-way scramble at Bound for Glory on October 11, 2026. The title was previously vacated by Leon Slater, who invoked Option C for a TNA World Championship match at Bound for Glory.

The championship is contested in TNA's X Division, which emphasizes fast-paced, acrobatic wrestling, traditionally featuring cruiserweight wrestlers. However, heavyweights including Samoa Joe, Kurt Angle, and Abyss have also won the championship at various times in the division's history. Since 2012, the X Division Championship has also allowed the current champion to vacate the title in exchange for a future match for the TNA World Championship, which is promoted as "Option C." This has occurred eight times in the championship's history, with four matches resulting in wins.

== History ==
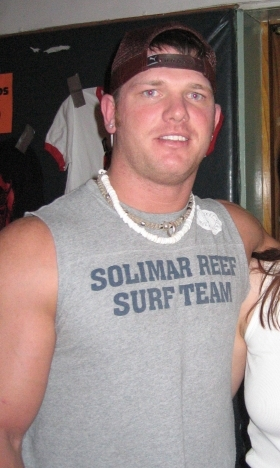
Inaugural champion A.J Styles.

=== X Division ===
The X Division was established on June 19, 2002 at Total Nonstop Action's first weekly PPV event. The first match in the X Division's history was a six man tag team match between The Flying Elvises (Jimmy Yang, Jorge Estrada, and Sonny Siaki) and the team of A.J. Styles, Jerry Lynn, and Low Ki. Later that day at the taping of the following weekly PPV event, TNA introduced the X Championship, now known as the X Division Championship, which was won by inaugural champion A.J. Styles. The division is described as a "fast paced version of professional wrestling", a style that is recognizable in Japan and Mexico. It was promoted under the motto "It is not about weight limits, it is about no limits" by commentator Mike Tenay. On the August 11, 2011, edition of TNA's primary television program, Impact Wrestling, TNA authority figure Eric Bischoff announced that the X Division would have a weight limit of 225 lb (102 kg). Following the appointment of Hulk Hogan as the new on-screen general manager in March 2012, the weight limit was ignored at Slammiversary on June 10, 2012, when 280 lb (130 kg) Samoa Joe was allowed to challenge for the title. In October 2012, the weight limit was officially repealed when 237 lb (108 kg) Rob Van Dam won the title at Bound for Glory.

In March 2013, the X Division was given a new set of rules:

1. All matches contested for the X Division Championship were triple threat matches.
2. The weight limit was set at 230 lb (100 kg).
3. The participant who was pinned or submitted in a title match was temporarily eliminated from title contention.
4. The participant who was not involved in the deciding fall automatically qualified for the succeeding title match.
5. To fill the third spot in a championship match, a qualifying triple threat match was held between the previously eliminated contender and two new potential challengers.

The new rules were short-lived, as then-champion Manik defended the title against Chris Sabin in a singles match five months later.

==== Specialty matches ====
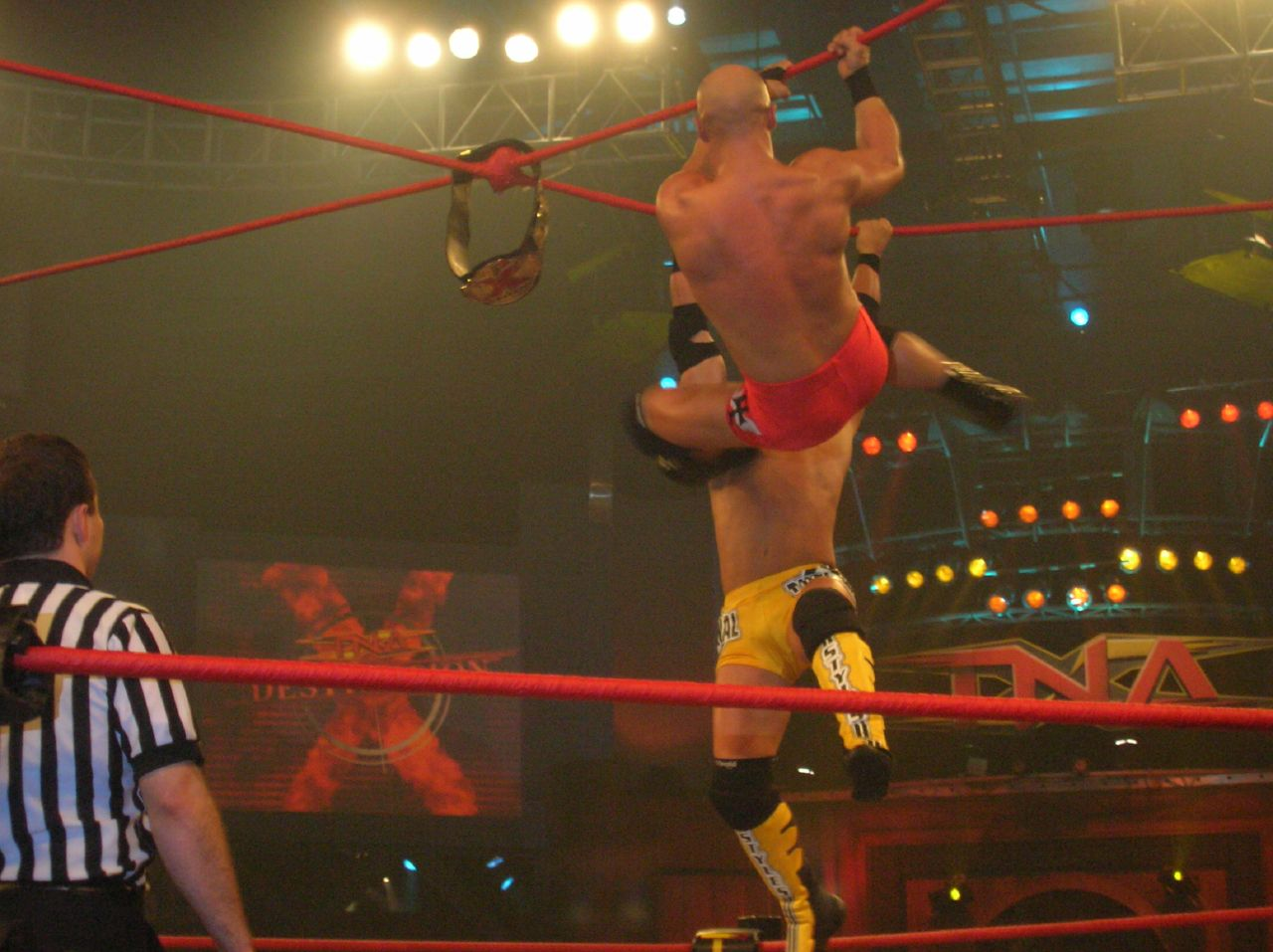
A.J. Styles (yellow shorts) and Christopher Daniels (red trunks) during an Ultimate X match in 2006.

The X Division utilizes several specialized match types to showcase the division's style and to serve as platforms for TNA X Division Championship defenses. Three prominent match types featured in TNA include the Ultimate X match, the Steel Asylum, and the Xscape match.

- The Ultimate X match was introduced on August 20, 2003. The inaugural match concluded with Michael Shane winning the vacant X Division Championship against Chris Sabin and Frankie Kazarian. A steel pillar is positioned behind each turnbuckle to support two cables that cross diagonally to form a large "X" above the center of the ring. The X Division Championship—or a red letter "X" representing a future title opportunity—is suspended at the central intersection of these cables. To win, a competitor must climb the corner pillars or jump from the top turnbuckle to reach the overhead cables, navigating toward the center to retrieve the prize. The use of ladders is strictly prohibited.
- The Steel Asylum (originally known as the TerrorDome) debuted at Sacrifice on May 11, 2008, where Frankie Kazarian emerged as the inaugural winner. The match features the ring completely enclosed by a large, red, domed steel cage with barred walls. To achieve victory, a competitor must climb the interior of the structure and be the first to escape through a circular opening located at the center of the domed ceiling. It was later rebranded as "The Steel Asylum" at Bound for Glory IV on October 12.
- The Xscape match was held at every Lockdown event from 2005 to 2011. It is a multi-stage contest that typically features four to six participants competing within a steel cage. Competitors are eliminated via pinfall or submission until two participants remain. The two survivors must then race to be the first to climb over the cage and escape to the floor to win the match.

=== Creation ===
The championship was created and debuted before the main event at the taping of TNA's second weekly PPV event on June 19, 2002; the event aired on June 26, 2002. Later, A.J. Styles defeated Low Ki, Jerry Lynn, and Psicosis in a four-way double elimination match to be crowned the inaugural champion; this match was announced as being for the NWA X Championship on the onscreen graphic while the ring announcer stated it was for the "NWA–TNA X Championship". Afterwards, the title was renamed the NWA–TNA X Division Championship and then shortened to just the TNA X Division Championship.

=== Unifications and external defenses ===
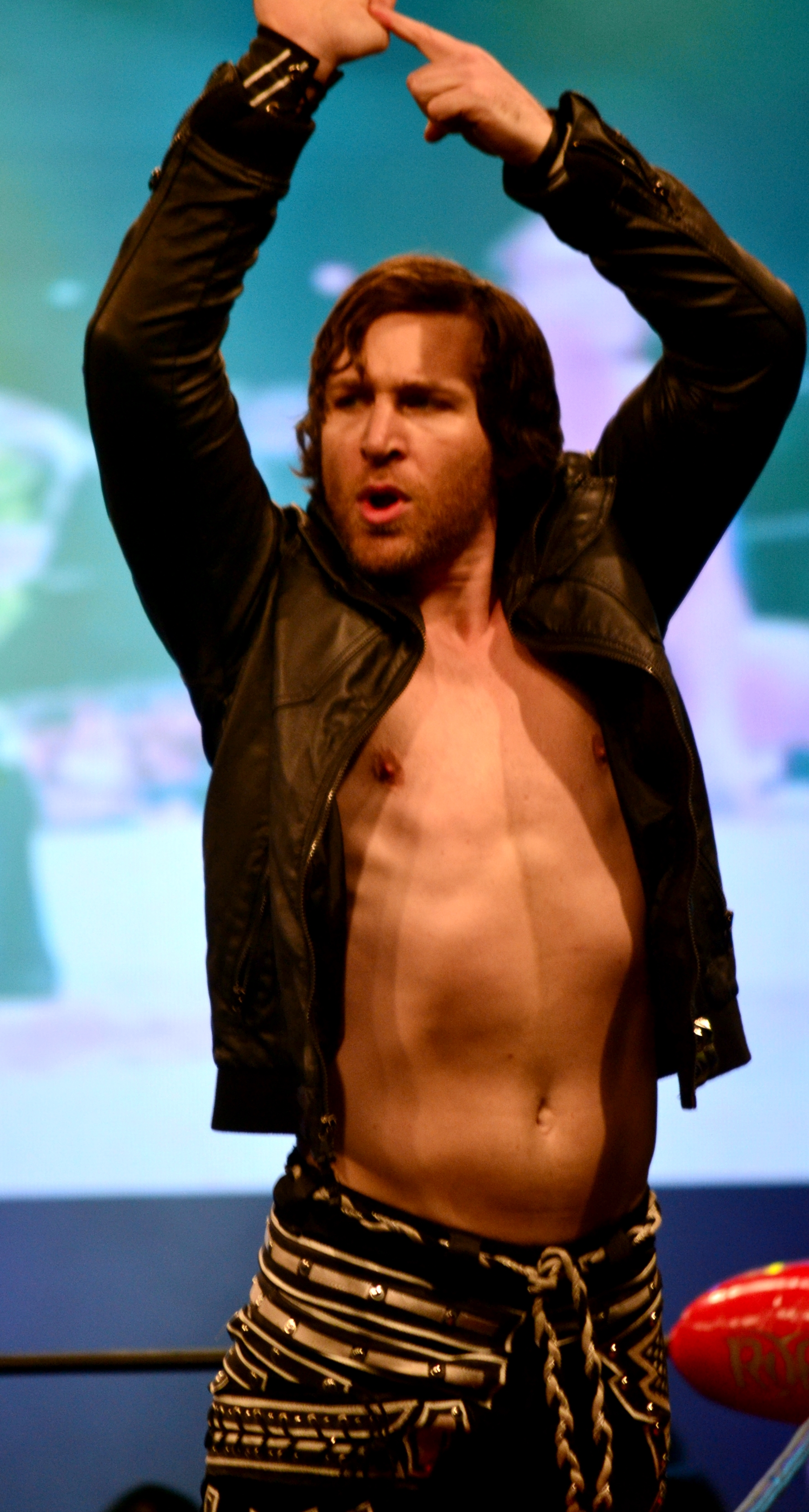
Record 10-time champion Chris Sabin

In July 2002, the X Division Champion AJ Styles defended the title against Adam Jacobs and David Young at Ring of Honor's Crowning a Champion, the first defense outside TNA. In May 2003, before the professional wrestling promotion World Wrestling All-Stars' (WWA) closed, then NWA–TNA X Division champion Chris Sabin defeated WWA International Cruiserweight Champion Jerry Lynn, Frankie Kazarian, and Johnny Swinger in a Four Corners championship unification match to unify the X Division Championship with the WWA International Cruiserweight Championship. In Winter 2004, Petey Williams defended the title in various IWA-Mid South events.

During Christopher Daniels' first reign in mid-2005, he defended the X Division Championship at several Pro Wrestling Guerrilla shows. The first defense happened at All Star Weekend - Night One on April 1 against Alex Shelley, while the second occurred at All Star Weekend – Night Two on April 2 against Chris Hero; Daniels won both encounters retaining the championship. At Jason Takes PWG on May 13, Daniels fought A.J. Styles for the X Division Championship and Styles' PWG Championship to a one-hour time-limit draw. Daniels successfully defended the X Division Title two more times in PWG; once at Guitarmageddon on June 11 against El Generico, while once at The 2nd Annual PWG Bicentennial Birthday Extravaganza - Night One on July 9 against fellow TNA wrestler Chris Sabin. In September 2005 at TNA's Unbreakable PPV event, the TNA X Division Championship was defended in the main event for the first time at a monthly PPV event; then-champion Christopher Daniels defended the championship against A.J. Styles and Samoa Joe.

The title was once again defended in the main event of a monthly event at TNA's August 2007 Hard Justice PPV event, where Kurt Angle defeated Samoa Joe to win the TNA X Division and the TNA World Tag Team Championship and retain the TNA World Heavyweight and IGF's version of the IWGP World Heavyweight Championship. This win made Angle the only in the history of TNA to hold every active championship at the same time; TNA World, X Division, and World Tag Team.

On March 4, 2014, the title was defended in Japan as part of Kaisen: Outbreak - a supershow event promoted by Wrestle-1 in partnership with TNA - where the title was won by Wrestle-1 star Seiya Sanada. On March 22, Sanada defended and retained the title on a Wrestle-1 show.

In January 2025, TNA and WWE signed a multi-year working partnership where TNA and NXT wrestlers will appear on each other's programming. On the February 25 episode of NXT, the X Division Championship became the first championship in TNA to be defended in WWE, where Moose successfully defended the title against NXT Heritage Cup Champion Lexis King.

=== Option C ===
Option C is a concept in which the current X Division Champion may voluntarily vacate the championship in exchange for a World Heavyweight Championship match. It began in June 2012 when then-champion Austin Aries said that he was not satisfied with being just the X Division Champion, which led to then-General Manager Hulk Hogan offering him a match for the World Heavyweight Championship, but only if he first vacated the X Division Championship. Aries agreed to Hogan's terms, on the condition that future X Division Champions be given the same opportunity.

==== Cash-in matches ====
Legend
Won cash-in match
Lost cash-in match

No.	Recipient	Opponent	Championship	Event	Date	Location	Ref.
1	Austin Aries	Bobby Roode (c)	TNA World Heavyweight Championship	Destination X	July 8, 2012	Orlando, FL	
2	Chris Sabin	Bully Ray (c)	TNA World Heavyweight Championship	Destination X	July 18, 2013	Louisville, KY	
3	Austin Aries	Lashley (c)	TNA World Heavyweight Championship	Destination X	June 26, 2014 (Aired: July 31)	New York, NY	
4	Rockstar Spud	Kurt Angle (c)	TNA World Heavyweight Championship	Destination X	May 17, 2015 (Aired: June 10)	Orlando, FL	
5	Brian Cage	Johnny Impact (c)	Impact World Championship	Homecoming	January 6, 2019	Nashville, TN	
6	Josh Alexander	Christian Cage (c)	Impact World Championship	Bound for Glory	October 23, 2021	Sunrise Manor, NV	
7	Frankie Kazarian	Josh Alexander (c)	Impact World Championship	Over Drive	November 18, 2022	Louisville, KY	
8	Leon Slater	Nic Nemeth (c)	TNA World Championship	Bound for Glory	October 11, 2026	Tampa, FL	
(c) – denotes the champion heading into the match

== Championship tournaments ==
=== TNA X Division Championship Tournament (2009) ===
At Final Resolution on December 7, 2008, Eric Young controversially dethroned Sheik Abdul Bashir for the TNA X Division Championship as Young won the title with the referee's help. Management Director Jim Cornette stripped Young of the title and announced a tournament to crown a new champion at Genesis. Alex Shelley won the tournament to become the new TNA X Division Champion.

TNA X Division Championship Tournament (2009) – Winner: Alex Shelley

Quarterfinals; Impact! December 8–9, 2008 (Aired: December 11–18)
Eric Young	Pinfall
Sheik Abdul Bashir	3:16
Alex Shelley	Pinfall
Jay Lethal	1:56
Chris Sabin	Pinfall
Sonjay Dutt	5:20
Consequences Creed	4:35
Kiyoshi	Pinfall

Semifinals; Impact! December 15–16, 2008 (Aired: December 25, 2008 – January 8, 2009)
Eric Young	4:34
Alex Shelley	Pinfall
Chris Sabin	Pinfall
Kiyoshi	4:30

Final; Genesis; January 11, 2009
Alex Shelley	Pinfall
Chris Sabin	16:41

=== TNA X Division Championship Tournament (2012) ===
On the June 21, 2012 episode of Impact Wrestling, reigning TNA X Division Champion Austin Aries announced that he will relinquish the title at Destination X in exchange for a TNA World Heavyweight Championship match. On the following week's episode, Aries announced a tournament to crown a new X Division Champion at Destination X. The tournament began with qualifying matches featuring wrestlers from the independent circuit. TNA wrestlers Douglas Williams, Kid Kash and Zema Ion received byes to advance to the first round of the tournament. The final spot in the tournament was filled by the winner of a four-way match consisting the losers of the qualifying matches. At Destination X, the remaining participants faced each other in singles matches, with the winners advancing to an Ultimate X match for the vacant title.

TNA X Division Championship Tournament (2012) – Winner: Zema Ion

Qualifiers; Impact Wrestling; June 28 – July 5, 2012; Destination X July 8, 2012
Sonjay Dutt	Pinfall
Rubix	3:06
Rashad Cameron	Pinfall
Mason Andrews	3:41
Flip Cassanova	Pinfall
Dakota Darsow	3:56
Kenny King	Pinfall
Lars Only	5:22
Dakota Darsow Lars Only Rubix	8:20 — —
Mason Andrews	Pinfall

1st Round; Destination X July 8, 2012
Sonjay Dutt	Pinfall
Rashad Cameron	7:10
Flip Cassanova	3:55
Zema Ion	Pinfall
Kenny King	Pinfall
Douglas Williams	10:35
Mason Andrews	Pinfall
Kid Kash	8:10

Final (Note: This was an Ultimate X match.); Destination X July 8, 2012
Sonjay Dutt	8:50
Zema Ion	Win
Kenny King	—
Mason Andrews	—

=== TNA X Division Championship Tournament (2013) ===
On the July 11, 2013, episode of Impact Wrestling, reigning TNA X Division Champion Chris Sabin relinquished the title to invoke Option C for a future TNA World Heavyweight Championship match. On the following week's episode, a tournament to crown a new champion began.

TNA X Division Championship Tournament (2013) – Winner: Manik

Qualifiers; Impact Wrestling: Destination X July 18, 2013
Homicide	4:19
Petey Williams	—
Sonjay Dutt	Pinfall
Chavo Guerrero Jr.	—
Kenny King	4:33
Manik	Pinfall
Greg Marasciulo	Pinfall
Rubix	—
Rockstar Spud	6:30

Final (Note: This was an Ultimate X match.); Impact Wrestling; July 18, 2013 (Aired: July 25)
Sonjay Dutt	12:00
Manik	Win
Greg Marasciulo	—

=== TNA X Division Championship Tournament (2014) ===
On the July 24, 2014, episode of Impact Wrestling, reigning TNA X Division Champion Austin Aries relinquished the title to invoke Option C. A tournament to crown a new champion began at Impact Wrestling: Destination X.

TNA X Division Championship Tournament (2014) – Winner: Samoa Joe

1st Round; Impact Wrestling: Destination X June 26, 2014 (Aired: July 31)
Low Ki	Pinfall
Manik	5:16
Zema Ion	—
Brian Cage	—
Crazzy Steve	4:33
Sanada	Pinfall
Homicide	9:49
Samoa Joe	Pinfall
Tigre Uno	—

Final; Impact Wrestling; June 26, 2014 (Aired: August 7)
Low Ki	—
Sanada	6:48
Samoa Joe	Submission

=== TNA X Division Championship Tournament (2015) ===
At Destination X on June 10, 2015, reigning TNA X Division Champion Rockstar Spud invoked Option C, relinquishing the title in exchange for a TNA World Heavyweight Championship match. A tournament to crown a new champion began on that episode.

TNA X Division Championship Tournament (2015) – Winner: Tigre Uno

1st Round; Impact Wrestling: Destination X May 11, 2015 (Aired: June 10)
Crazzy Steve	—
Low Ki	Pinfall
Manik	3:30
Cruz	5:12
Grado	Pinfall
Kenny King	—
DJ Z	—
Mark Andrews	5:25
Tigre Uno	Pinfall

Finals (Note: This was an elimination match.); Impact Wrestling; June 24, 2015
Low Ki	5:11
Grado	2:20 (Note: Grado was eliminated by Low Ki.)
Tigre Uno	Pinfall

=== Impact X Division Championship Tournament (2021) ===
On the September 23, 2021, episode of Impact!, Impact started a tournament to determine the new Impact X Division Champion, since the title was vacated after Josh Alexander invoked Option C to challenge for the Impact World Championship. The tournament culminated at Bound for Glory on October 23.

Impact X Division Championship Tournament (2021) – Winner: Trey Miguel

1st Round; Impact! September 30 – October 14, 2021
Alex Zayne	—
Laredo Kid	8:41
Trey Miguel	Pinfall
Black Taurus	—
Petey Williams	7:12
Steve Maclin	Pinfall
El Phantasmo	Pinfall
Rohit Raju	9:38
Willie Mack	—

Final; Bound for Glory; October 23, 2021
Trey Miguel	Pinfall
Steve Maclin	—
El Phantasmo	13:21

=== Impact X Division Championship Tournament (2022) ===
After previous champion Frankie Kazarian vacated the Impact X Division Championship to invoke Option C, TNA announced on October 20, 2022, an eight-man single-elimination tournament to determine the new champion at Over Drive on November 18. Trey Miguel won the tournament by defeating Black Taurus in the final at Over Drive to win the Impact X Division Championship.

== Championship belt designs ==
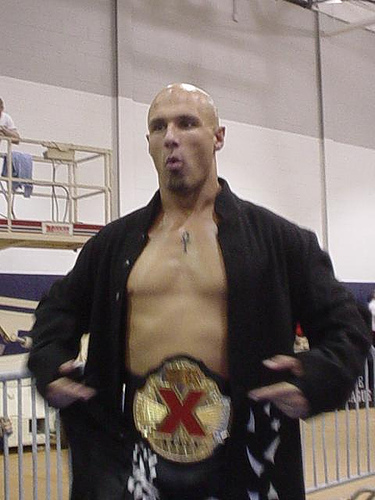
Christopher Daniels with the original design of the X-Division Championship belt.

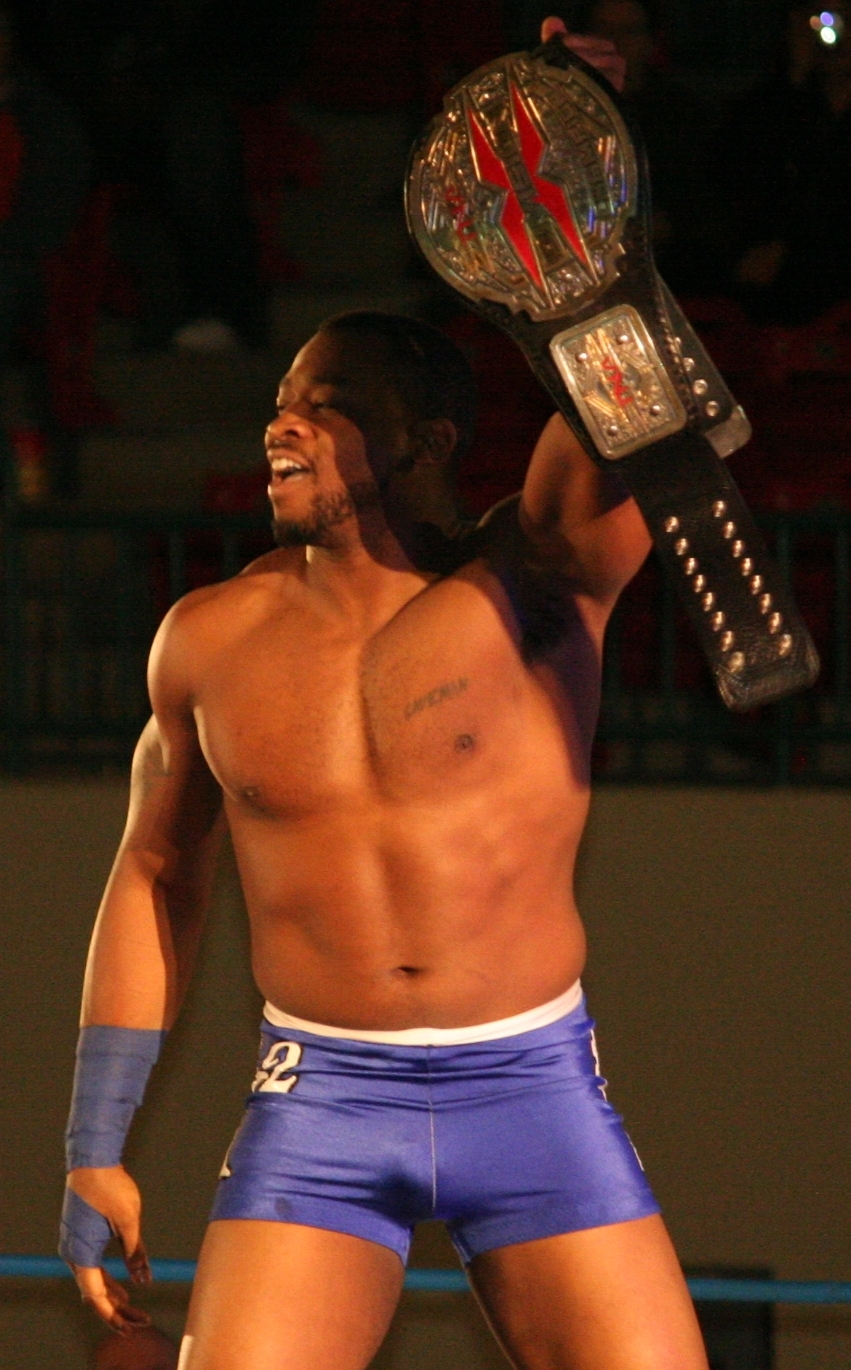
Kenny King with the 2nd design of the X-Division title.

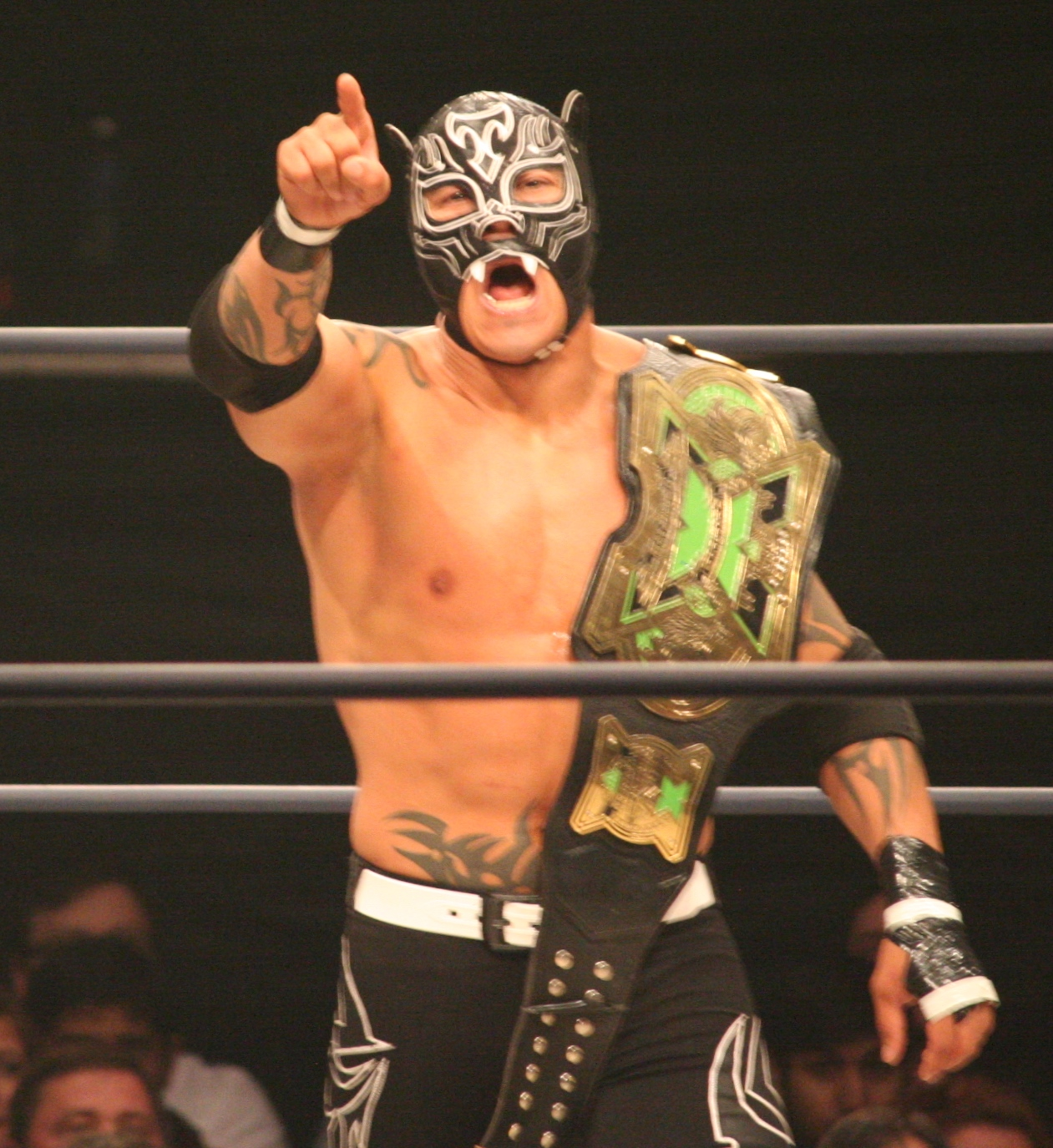
Tigre Uno with the 2015 design of the championship belt.

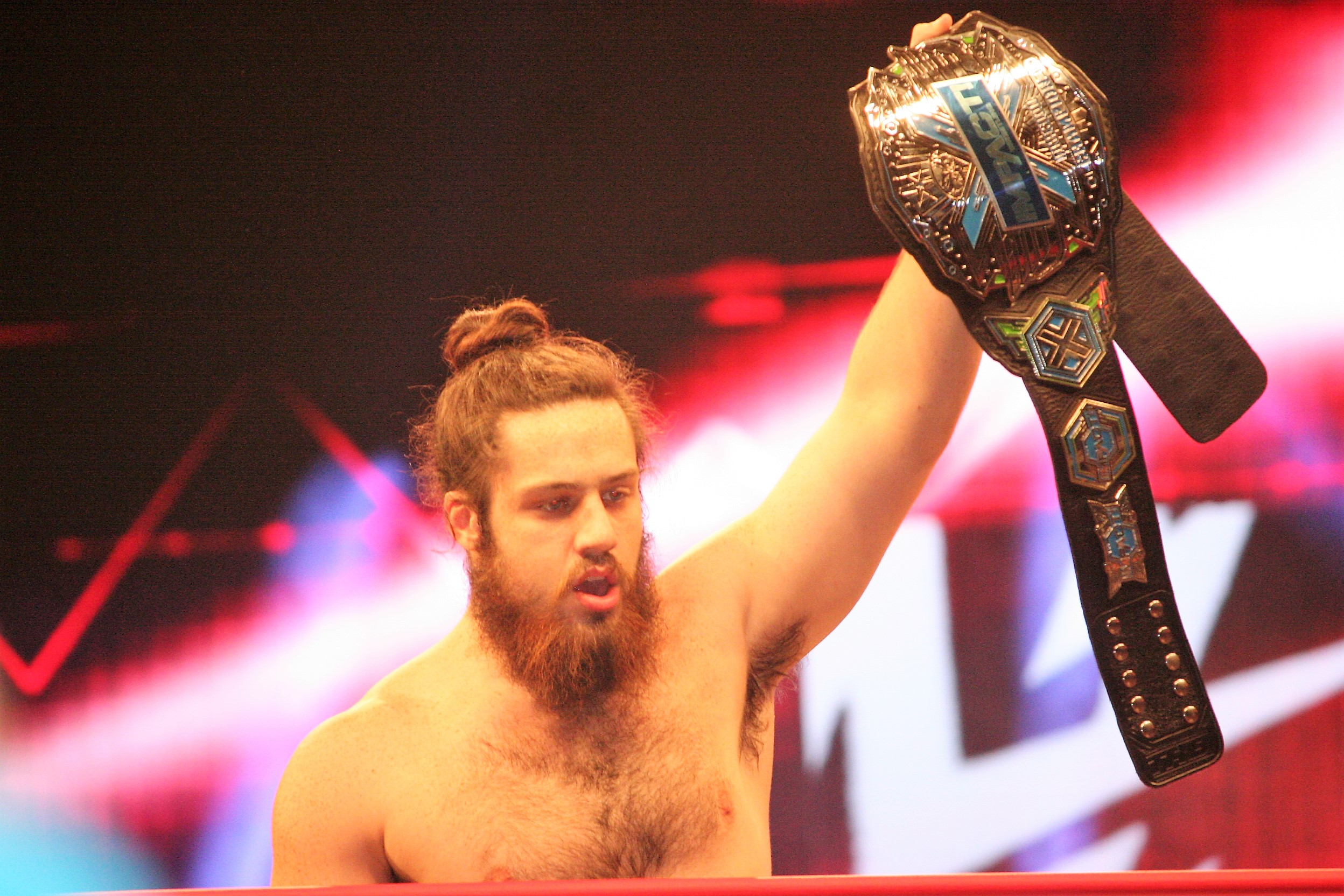
Trevor Lee with the 2017 design of the belt.

The 2020 design of the title.

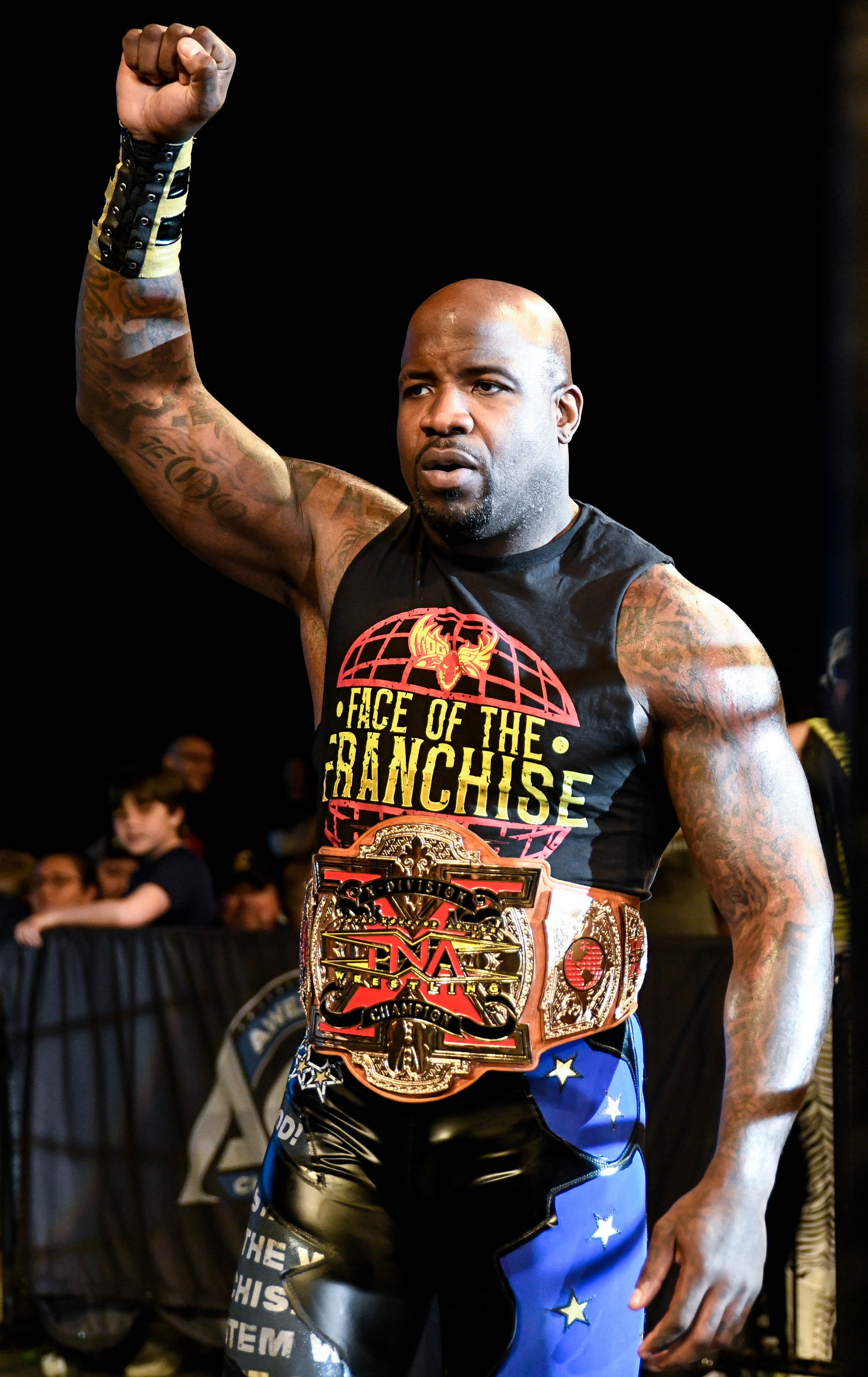
Moose with his custom version of the belt in 2025.

In May 2007, the National Wrestling Alliance (NWA) ended their five-year partnership with TNA, which allowed the NWA to regain control over the NWA World Heavyweight and World Tag Team Championships that TNA had controlled since June 2002. TNA then introduced a new TNA X Division Championship belt on the May 16, 2007 edition of TNA's online podcast TNA Today. Jeremy Borash and Management Director Jim Cornette, TNA's on-screen authority figure at the time, unveiled the new belt and awarded it to then-champion Chris Sabin.

On July 19, 2013, then TNA President Dixie Carter unveiled a new design for the championship, with blue accents to match the color scheme of the company. On June 16, 2015, TNA tweaked the belt's design by recoloring its accents from blue to green.

On August 18, 2017, the X Division Championship belt was given a complete overhaul to reflect TNA's short-lived change to the Global Force Wrestling moniker. On October 26, 2017, Trevor Lee was seen in a taped segment on Impact! with the title belt re-branded for Impact Wrestling. In 2018, Impact Wrestling redesigned the belt, putting a big blue "X" on the center plate, and made blue the dominant color.

On January 19, 2025 at Genesis, reigning champion Moose debuted a new belt for his defense against Ace Austin, having in previous episodes of Impact disparaged the belt's look and calling it "the ugliest title I've ever seen in my life." The plates were gold on a burnt orange leather strap, with the words "The System" and Moose's logo on the belt snaps printed in red. Moose used this design for the rest of his reign.

== Reigns ==
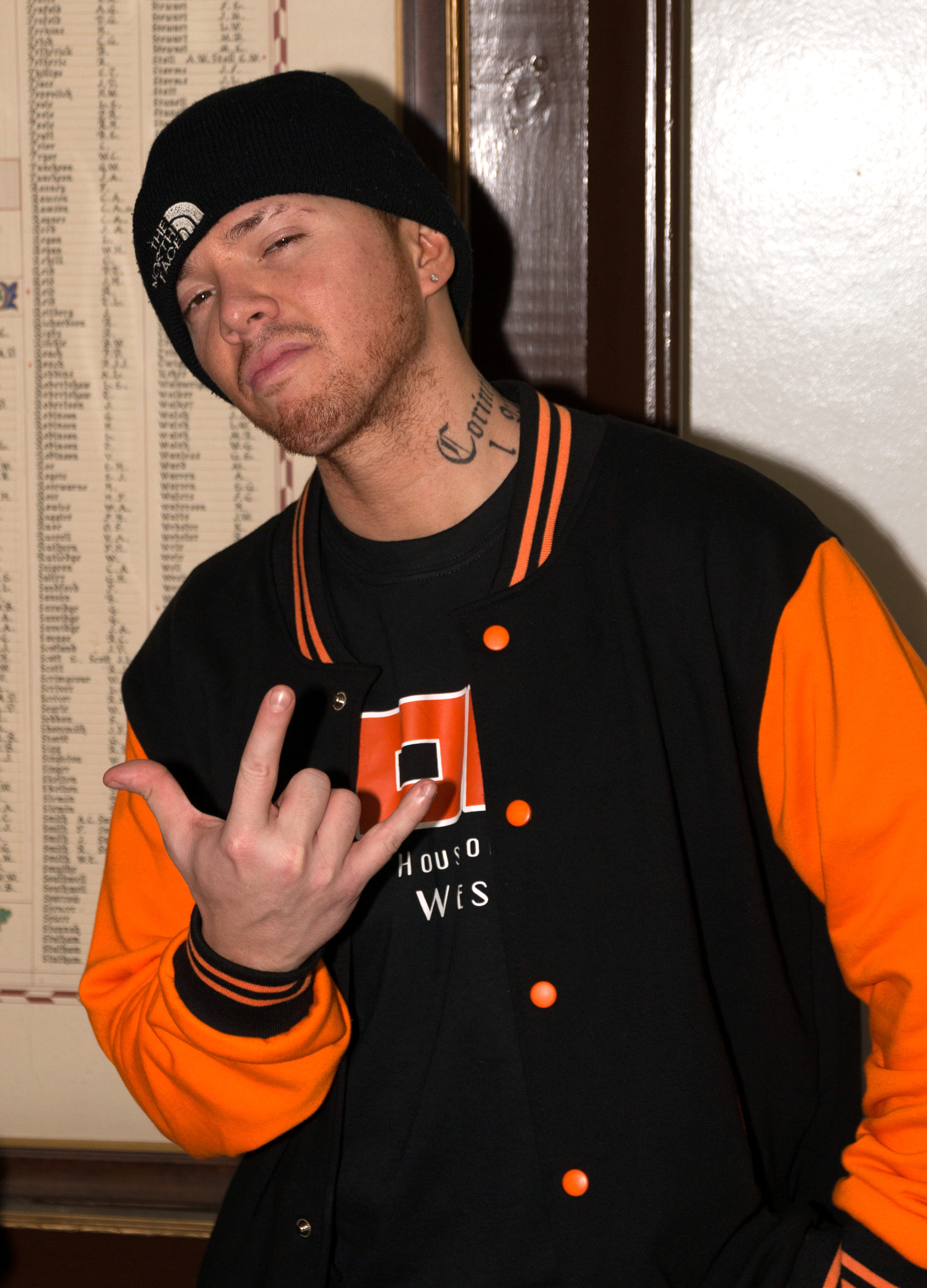
Current and four-time champion Amazing Red

The inaugural champion was A.J. Styles, who won the championship by defeating Low Ki, Jerry Lynn, and Psicosis in a Four Way Double Elimination match on June 19, 2002 at TNA's second weekly PPV event. At 298 days, Austin Aries' first reign and Leon Slater are tied for the longest reign in the title's history. At less than one day, Eric Young's only reign, Chris Sabin's sixth reign, Rockstar Spud's second reign, and Leon Slater's second reign are the shortest in the title's history. Chris Sabin holds the record for most reigns with 10.

Amazing Red is the current champion in his fourth reign. He won the vacant title by defeating BDE, Cedric Alexander, Fabian Aichner, KC Navarro, Rich Swann, and Ryan Nemeth in a seven-way scramble at Bound for Glory on October 11, 2026, in Tampa, Florida. The title was previously vacated by Leon Slater, who invoked Option C for a TNA World Championship match at Bound for Glory.

== Notes ==
- Total Nonstop Action. TNA Wrestling: Ultimate Matches. TNA Home Video.
- Total Nonstop Action. TNA Wrestling: Year One. TNA Home Video.
- Total Nonstop Action. TNA Wrestling: The Best of the X Division Vol. 1. TNA Home Video.
- Total Nonstop Action. TNA Wrestling: The Best of the X Division Vol. 2. TNA Home Video.

== See also ==
- X Division
- List of current champions in TNA Wrestling
