= Chris Candido Memorial Tag Team Tournament =

Sports competition

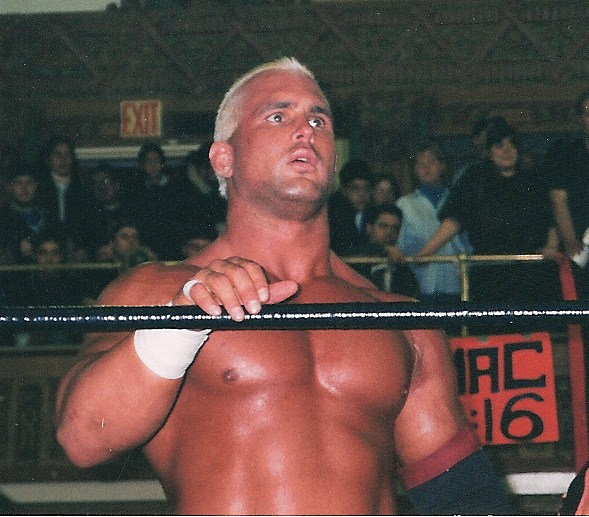
- Chris Candido, who the tournament was meant to honor
- Venue: TNA Impact! Zone
- Location: Orlando, Florida
- Start date: August 16, 2005
- End date: August 16, 2005
- Competitors: Abyss and Shark Boy; Alex Shelley and Sean Waltman; B.G. James and Cassidy Reilly; Chris Sabin and Shocker; Kip James and Petey Williams; Konnan and Lance Hoyt; Mikey Batts and Simon Diamond; Ron Killings and Sonjay Dutt

Champions
- Men: Alex Shelley and Sean Waltman

The Chris Candido Memorial Tag Team Tournament was a professional wrestling tag team, a single-elimination tournament held by the Total Nonstop Action Wrestling (TNA) promotion in 2005. It was held to honor the TNA wrestler Chris Candido, who died in April 2005 as a result of acute pneumonia. It is the only edition held as of 2026 despite being announced as an annual event. The competition began and concluded on August 16, 2005, at the tapings of TNA's television program TNA Impact!. It was broadcast from August 19 to September 9 with episodes of Impact! It was known by various names: the 2005 Chris Candido Memorial Tag Team Tournament, The Chris Candido Memorial Tag Team Tournament, and The Chris Candido Cup Tournament.

The concept of the tournament was to have eight teams consisting of one veteran wrestler and one rookie wrestler competing against each other to gain entry into a Four Way Elimination Tag Team match for the NWA World Tag Team Championship at TNA's Unbreakable PPV event on September 11. The tournament featured sixteen TNA wrestlers: Abyss, Shark Boy, Alex Shelley, Sean Waltman, B.G. James, Cassidy Reilly, Chris Sabin, Shocker, Kip James, Petey Williams, Konnan, Lance Hoyt, Mikey Batts, Simon Diamond, Ron Killings, and Sonjay Dutt.

The tournament was well-received overall. James Caldwell of the Pro Wrestling Torch wrote in his review of the matches that they were "solid" and "effective in telling the story." Caldwell approved of the teaming of Shelley and Waltman, feeling that they were a "natural fit."

== Background ==
Chris Candido was an American professional wrestler who wrestled for TNA starting in 2005. At TNA's Lockdown PPV event on April 24, 2005, Candido teamed with Lance Hoyt to face Apolo and Sonny Siaki in a Six Sides of Steel Cage match. During the encounter, Candido suffered an injury, which was later diagnosed as a dislocated ankle, broken tibia, and a broken fibula, which required surgery. Candido had an operation on April 25 to have a plate, screws, and pins placed in his ankle to fix the problem, with him being sidelined from competing for two to three months heal. However, Candido hoped to be fully recovered in six to eight weeks. On April 28, Candido was rushed to the hospital after he collapsed, where he died a short time later. The cause of death was released by Candido's brother Johnny Candido, as a blood clot due to the surgery a few days prior.

TNA released a public statement on April 29, regarding the subject. TNA paid tribute to Candido on the April 29 episode of TNA's television program TNA Impact! and at TNA's Hard Justice PPV event on May 15. The April 29, episode of Impact! Opened and ended with a memorial to Candido. At Hard Justice, a ten-bell salute was held while a photo of Candido, a pair of boots, and one-half of the NWA World Tag Team Championship positioned on a steel chair sat in the center of the ring. TNA donated some Lockdown DVD sale profits to the Chris Candido Memorial Fund. TNA originally planned to remove Candido's match from the DVD but was given his family's blessing to include it in the publication. A tribute to Candido was included on the DVD by TNA.

The tournament was announced in August 2005 by TNA editor Bill Banks. He revealed the official name for the competition, the "2005 Chris Candido Memorial Tag Team Tournament", and that TNA was planning on it being an annual contest. Banks also announced that the tournament format involved veteran wrestlers teaming with young wrestlers to compete. The idea behind the contest was explained on the August 19 episode of Impact! prior to the opening bout of the tournament. The tournament was set up in a way that mimicked Candido's role at the time of his death. Before his death, the veteran Candido was managing the young tag team of The Naturals (Andy Douglas and Chase Stevens). Candido managed the team to win the NWA World Tag Team Championship from America's Most Wanted (Chris Harris and James Storm; AMW) on the April 29 episode of Impact!, which had been taped on April 25 before his death.

In the tournament, eight tag teams were determined randomly, with one veteran wrestler being placed with a younger wrestler from the company. The competition was also called the "Chris Candido Memorial Cup Tournament". The teams chosen at random were Abyss (veteran) and Shark Boy (young), Alex Shelley (young) and Sean Waltman (veteran), B.G. James (veteran) and Cassidy Reilly (young), Chris Sabin (young) and Shocker (veteran), Kip James (veteran) and Petey Williams (young), Konnan (veteran) and Lance Hoyt (young), Mikey Batts (young) and Simon Diamond (veteran), and last of all Ron Killings (veteran) and Sonjay Dutt (young). On the August 26 episode of Impact!, NWA Championship Committee member Larry Zbyszko announced that a Four Way Elimination Tag Team match for the NWA World Tag Team Championship was planned for TNA's Unbreakable PPV event on September 11, in which The Naturals would defend against AMW, Team Canada (A-1 and Eric Young), and the winners of the Chris Candido Memorial Tag Team Tournament.

== Tournament ==
The Chris Candido Memorial Tag Team Tournament featured seven matches involving different wrestlers from pre-existing scripted feuds and storylines. Wrestlers portrayed villains, heroes, or less distinguishable characters in the scripted events that built tension and culminated in a wrestling match.

The tournament consisted of three rounds: the quarterfinals, semifinals, and finals. All three rounds were broadcast on Impact!. All three rounds were taped on August 16 and aired on the August 19, August 26, September 2, and September 9 episodes of Impact!.

Quarterfinals

The first two matches of the quarterfinals took place on the August 19 episode of Impact!. The team of Chris Sabin and Shocker were pitted against the team of Mikey Batts and Simon Diamond in the first. Sabin and Shocker won the bout after Sabin slammed Batts back-first into the mat with his signature Cradle Shock maneuver and followed with the pin at 7 minutes and 1 second. In the second, the team of B.G. James and Cassidy Reilly fought the team of Ron Killings and Sonjay Dutt. Dutt won the match at 4 minutes and 14 seconds for his team after a 450° aerial splash onto Reilly and the pin.

The last two were held on the August 26 episode of Impact!. The Alex Shelley and Sean Waltman team faced Abyss and Shark Boy in a bout lasting 4 minutes and 10 seconds. Shelley pinned Shark Boy after slamming him face-first into the mat with his signature Shellshock maneuver. The second encounter was between the team of Lance Hoyt and Konnan and the team of Kip James and Petey Williams. The team of Hoyt and Konnan won the bout after Hoyt pinned Kip following a boot to the face at 6 minutes and 49 seconds.

Semifinals

The semifinals were held on the September 2 episode of Impact!. Shelley and Waltman defeated the Hoyt and Konnan teams in the first semifinal match in 4 minutes and 22 seconds. During the match, Hoyt hit Waltman with a boot to the face and went for the pin, but the referee was distracted by Kip James, who came down to ringside. Hoyt went to get the referee, allowing Waltman to hit him in the groin and follow up by slamming him face-first into the mat with his signature X-Factor maneuver.

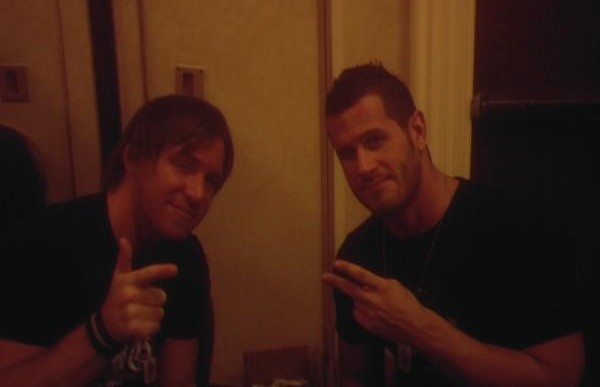
Chris Sabin (left) and Alex Shelley (right) both competed in the final round of the Chris Candido Memorial Tag Team Tournament.

Sabin and Shocker defeated Dutt and Killings in the second semifinal match at 7 minutes and 49 seconds. During the contest, Sabin accidentally hit his teammate Shocker in the face. This led to confusion in the match, allowing Killings to get a near-fall on Sabin. This was later resolved, with Sabin getting the pin on Dutt via la magistral.

Finals

The final round occurred on the September 9 episode of Impact!, with Sabin and Shocker versus Shelley and Waltman. This contest lasted 7 minutes and 20 seconds. Sabin and Shelley started the match, with Shelley dominating Sabin with mat submission holds. The wrestling left the ring as Waltman performed a somersault splash to the ringside area onto Shocker and Sabin. Later, Sabin ascended to the top rope to perform a dropkick on Shelley, only to have Shelley dodge out of the way, resulting in Sabin hitting his partner Shocker instead. After checking on Shocker, Sabin turned around and was met with Shelley's kick to the jaw. Sabin left the ring after this due to a legitimate injury. With Shocker left and the referee attending to other matters, Waltman hit Shocker in the groin and followed by performing his X-Factor maneuver to gain the pinfall victory and win the tournament.

Shelley and Waltman's victory made them the first winners of the expected annual tournament. They also gained entry into the Four Way Elimination Tag Team match for the NWA World Tag Team Championship scheduled for Unbreakable.

Tournament bracket

Quarterfinals (TV – TNA Impact!)
Chris Sabin and Shocker	Pinfall
Mikey Batts and Simon Diamond	07:01
B.G. James and Cassidy Reilly	04:14
Ron Killings and Sonjay Dutt	Pinfall
Abyss and Shark Boy	04:10
Alex Shelley and Sean Waltman	Pinfall
Lance Hoyt and Konnan	Pinfall
Kip James and Petey Williams	06:49

Semifinals (TV – TNA Impact!)
Chris Sabin and Shocker	Pinfall
Ron Killings and Sonjay Dutt	07:49
Alex Shelley and Sean Waltman	Pinfall
Lance Hoyt and Konnan	04:22

Finals (TV – TNA Impact!)
Chris Sabin and Shocker	07:20
Alex Shelley and Sean Waltman	Pinfall

== Reception ==
James Caldwell of the Pro Wrestling Torch felt that Chris Sabin and Shocker versus Simon Diamond and Mikey Batts was "solid wrestling" and a "nice opening match" for the tournament. Regarding the second tournament match, B.G. James and Cassidy Reilly versus Ron Killings and Sonjay Dutt, Caldwell felt that James and Killings "undermined the spirit of the Candido tournament" by dancing mid-way through their encounter. Caldwell commented on the pairing of Alex Shelley and Sean Waltman for the tournament, saying they were a "natural fit working together" and expressing hope that they would be a permanent fixture after the tournament concluded. Regarding the semifinal matches, Caldwell thought Sabin and Shocker versus Dutt and Killings was a "solid match with a nice mini-storyline involving Sabin and Shocker having a miscommunication before settling their differences to win the match." As for the finals, Caldwell stated that Shelley and Waltman versus Sabin and Shocker was a "standard tag match" but it was "effective in telling the story of Waltman and Shelley doing whatever it takes to win while Shocker and Sabin continued to have differences that finally caused Shocker to go off." Caldwell concluded by saying that "Waltman and Shelley have impressed as a legit tag team since their first round match in the tournament," going on to say that he hoped for a Waltman and Shelley victory at Unbreakable to "give the tag division a fresh team to build around."

== Aftermath ==
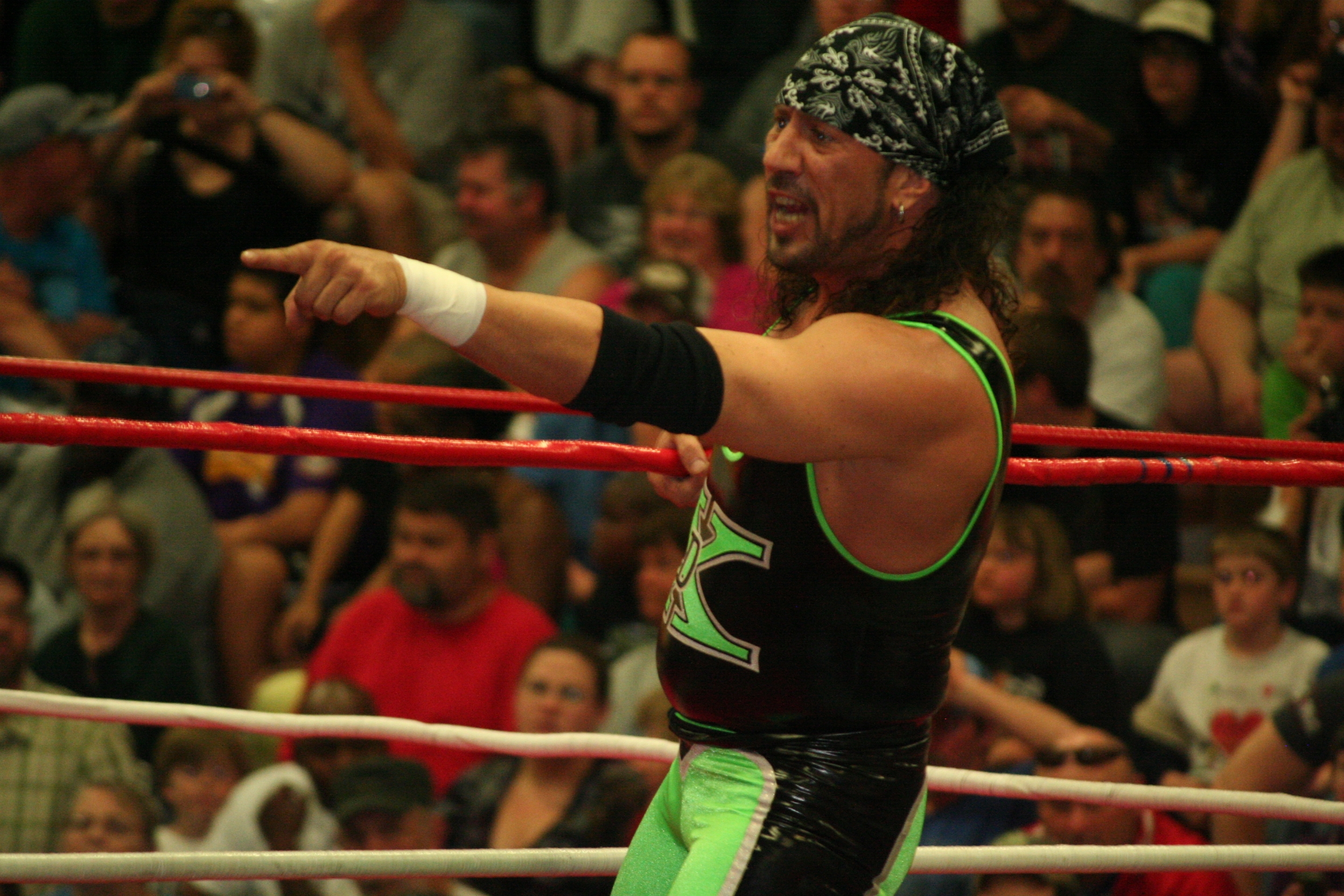
Sean Waltman (pictured) missed TNA's Unbreakable pay-per-view event.

Chris Sabin's jaw was broken in the final round match. Sabin needed serious medical assistance afterward backstage due to excessive bleeding from the mouth. As a result, Sabin had to cancel an August 19 Pro Wrestling Guerrilla (PWG) appearance. Shelley was also injured while taking part in the tournament. He suffered a legitimate back injury but ended up appearing at the PWG show that Sabin was forced to miss. There, he aggravated the injury further, forcing him to miss two Ring of Honor shows for which he was scheduled.

At Unbreakable, The Naturals (Andy Douglas and Chase Stevens) defeated the teams of Alex Shelley and Johnny Candido, America's Most Wanted (Chris Harris and James Storm), and Team Canada (A-1 and Eric Young) to remain champions in a Four Way Elimination Tag Team match. Johnny replaced Waltman, who missed the event for undisclosed reasons. Shelley began the bout alone, until Johnny, who was in attendance along with several of Candido's family members, jumped the railing to join Shelley as his tag team partner by taking a tag from Shelley. A bit later, Douglas kicked Candido in the crotch and pinned him with a roll-up pin, thus eliminating Shelley and Candido from the contest.

TNA did not use Waltman again until their Final Resolution PPV event on January 15, 2006. There, Waltman defeated Raven in a Raven's Rules match, forcing Raven to leave TNA in the storyline. The company did not use Waltman because management was angered by his failure to participate in Unbreakable. Despite not showing up to the event, Waltman was in Orlando dressed to compete but arrived after the arena.
