= Diamonds in the Rough (professional wrestling) =

Professional wrestling stable

Stable
- Former member(s): Simon Diamond (leader); Trytan; Elix Skipper; David Young
- Debut: June 19, 2005
- Disbanded: February 2007
- Years active: 2005–2007

The Diamonds in the Rough was a professional wrestling stable in Total Nonstop Action Wrestling, led by the eponymous Simon Diamond.

== History ==
The Diamonds were formed at TNA Slammiversary on June 19, 2005 when Simon Diamond returned to TNA after a several month absence, introducing Trytan as his "insurance policy". Diamond and Trytan then defeated Apolo and Sonny Siaki in a tag match. The Diamonds next appeared on the July 1 episode of TNA Impact!, where Diamond boasted that, as he had recruited a 7 ft 0 in (2.13 m) "wrecking machine", he had "all of the answers". Diamond and Trytan lost to America's Most Wanted after they were outmaneuvered by the veteran tag team. On July 15 they defeated Apolo and Siaki in a Slammiversary rematch.

Trytan left TNA in July 2005 after he could not agree on a new contract with TNA, and at TNA No Surrender 2005 on July 17, Diamond introduced his new protégé, David Young. Citing Young's ability to "bench press 400 pounds (180 kg)", Diamond insisted that Young's two year losing streak was due to a lack of direction and leadership, which Diamond would provide. This is where the name of the stable originated, as Diamond hailed David Young as a "diamond in the rough". Diamond and Young then faced Apolo and Sonny Siaki in a near-rematch from Slammiversary, with Young losing to Apolo following a TKO.

In the main event of the August 5 episode of Impact!, Diamond and Young faced NWA World Heavyweight Champion Raven and Sabu. Young was pinned after receiving a Raven Effect DDT from Raven and a splash from Sabu, while Diamond watched from outside the ring, disgruntled at Young's inability to kick out. The Diamonds faced America's Most Wanted once more on August 12, and defeated them after Team Canada interfered.

At the outset of Sacrifice on August 10, Diamond came to the ring and talked about the career of Elix Skipper, claiming that he had been "a star" as one-third of Triple X, but that he had been "a lost soul" since XXX disbanded. Diamond then promised to make Skipper "a star again". Diamond, Young and Skipper then faced Chris Sabin, Sonjay Dutt and Shark Boy in a six man tag match. The Diamonds lost after Skipper was rolled-up by Sabin, and Diamond berated his team as a result.

Diamond teamed with Mikey Batts on the August 19 episode of Impact!, facing Shocker and Chris Sabin in the first round of the Chris Candido Cup. During the match, commentators Mike Tenay and Don West speculated that Batts was "auditioning" for membership in the Diamonds in the Rough. Diamond and Batts lost the match after Sabin pinned Batts, and he did not join the Diamonds. On the August 26 episode of Impact!, Diamond and Young defeated the regular tag team of Mikey Batts and Jerrelle Clark, with Young pinning Clark following a spinebuster. Later in the program, Diamond accompanied Skipper to ringside, and watched in disappointment as his protégé lost to Apolo. On the September 9 episode of Impact!, Skipper defeated Sonjay Dutt following interference from Young.

At Unbreakable on September 11, the Diamonds lost to the 3 Live Kru in a six man tag team match. The stable was inactive throughout the remainder of September and early October as Diamond toured India to promote the debut of Impact! on ESPN Star Sports, but reconvened on October 23 at TNA Bound for Glory, where they defeated Siaki, Apolo and Shark Boy. On a special two-hour episode of Impact! on November 3, the Diamonds lost to Sabu, Lance Hoyt and Jeff Hardy in a six man tag team match. At Genesis on November 13 they defeated Hoyt and The Naturals, with Skipper pinning Chase Stevens.

On the December 4 episode of Impact!, all three members of the Diamonds were announced as Raven's opponents in a handicap Raven's House of Fun match booked by Director of Authority Larry Zbyszko to encourage Raven to resign from TNA. Despite interference on his behalf by Cassidy Riley, Raven was decisively beaten after the Diamonds drove him through a table and then pinned him.

On a prime time episode of Impact! on December 8, 2005, the Diamonds interrupted a ceremony in which Chicago White Sox catcher A. J. Pierzynski and strength trainer Dale Torborg presented TNA wrestlers A.J. Styles, Chris Sabin and Sonjay Dutt with memorabilia from the 2005 World Series. Diamond, himself a former baseball player, mocked Pierzynski's .256 batting average, telling him that he needed a designated hitter. Diamond then slapped Torborg, leading to a brawl. As a result, Torborg, Sabin and Dutt, with Pierzynski in their corner, faced the Diamonds at TNA Turning Point 2005 on December 11. The Diamonds lost following interference from then-Boston Red Sox outfielder Johnny Damon. In the main event of the December 17 episode of Impact!, Young and Skipper were defeated by Team 3D. At TNA Final Resolution 2006 on January 15 they were defeated by The James Gang.

At TNA Against All Odds 2006 on February 12, 2006, Skipper and Young teamed with Shannon Moore, losing to Lance Hoyt, Cassidy Riley and Shark Boy in a six man tag team match. At TNA Destination X 2006 on March 12, 2006, Skipper and Young defeated Norman Smiley and Shark Boy.

On the March 11, 2006 episode of Impact!, Diamond, providing commentary during an eight man tag team bout featuring Skipper and Young, complained about Pierzynski having been presented with a replica belt by TNA. One week later, Diamond, accompanied by Alex Shelley and his "ShelleyCam", attended the White Sox spring training in order to confront Pierzynski. Pierzynski challenged Diamond to a fight, but he was struck from behind with a chair by manager Ozzie Guillén before he could give his response. On April 23, 2006 at TNA Lockdown 2006, Skipper took part in a six man "Xscape" match that was won by Chris Sabin. On July 16, 2006 at TNA Victory Road 2006, the team returned to action (after a month-long hiatus from TNA) losing to The Naturals in a tag match.

In late February 2007, David Young and "Primetime" Elix Skipper were both released from their TNA Contracts. Simon Diamond remained with the company as a road agent until his release on November 2, 2008. Young went on to revive the Diamonds in the Rough team name in 2010, while teaming with Sigmon on the Midwest independent circuit.

== Championships and accomplishments ==
- Great Championship Wrestling
  - GCW Tag Team Championship (1 time) – Skipper and Young
- NWA Wrestle Birmingham
  - NWA Wrestle Birmingham Tag Team Championship (1 time) – Skipper and Young
