= Hard Justice (2005) =

2005 Total Nonstop Action Wrestling pay-per-view event

- Promotional poster featuring Jeff Jarrett
- Promotion: Total Nonstop Action Wrestling
- Date: May 15, 2005
- City: Orlando, Florida
- Venue: TNA Impact! Zone
- Attendance: 775

Pay-per-view chronology
← Previous; Lockdown	Next → Slammiversary

Hard Justice chronology
← Previous; First	Next → 2006

The 2005 Hard Justice was a professional wrestling pay-per-view (PPV) event produced by the Total Nonstop Action Wrestling (TNA) promotion, which took place on May 15, 2005, at the TNA Impact! Zone in Orlando, Florida. It was the first event under the Hard Justice chronology and the fifth event in the 2005 TNA PPV schedule. Eight matches and one pre-show match were featured on the event's card.

The main event was for the NWA World Heavyweight Championship between then-champion Jeff Jarrett and the challenger A.J. Styles with Tito Ortiz as Special Guest Referee. Styles ended up winning the bout, thus winning the championship for the third time. TNA held a Twenty-Man Gauntlet for the Gold to determine the number one contender to the NWA World Heavyweight Championship. The match came down to Abyss and Ron Killings, with Abyss coming out as the victor. The TNA X Division Championship defense by Christopher Daniels against Shocker was another highly promoted match for the event. Daniels won the bout, successfully retaining the title. The Naturals (Andy Douglas and Chase Stevens) defended the NWA World Tag Team Championship against America's Most Wanted (Chris Harris and James Storm; AMW) on the card. The Naturals ended up retaining the tag team championship over AMW.

The event is marked for Styles' winning the NWA World Heavyweight Championship for the third time and for opening with a memorial for Chris Candido, who died prior to the show. Jason Clevett of the professional wrestling section of the Canadian Online Explorer felt the event was the "most entertaining pay per view from TNA since January's Final Resolution."

== Production ==
=== Background ===
Hard Justice was announced in early March 2005 as taking place on May 15 at the TNA Impact! Zone in Orlando, Florida. A section covering the event was created on TNA's official website prior to the show. TNA released a poster promoting the event featuring Jeff Jarrett at some point beforehand. TNA planned a thirty-minute pre-show prior to the event, featuring Shark Boy versus David Young for a spot in the Twenty-Man Gauntlet for the Gold to take place during the telecast. TNA opened the show with a ten-bell salute to TNA wrestler Chris Candido, who died on April 28, 2005, due to a blood clot from surgery to fix an injury sustained at TNA's previous PPV event Lockdown on April 24, 2005.

=== Storylines ===
Hard Justice featured eight professional wrestling matches and one pre-show match that involved wrestlers from pre-existing scripted feuds and storylines portraying villains, heroes, or less distinguishable characters; these scripted events built tension and culminated in a wrestling match or series of matches.

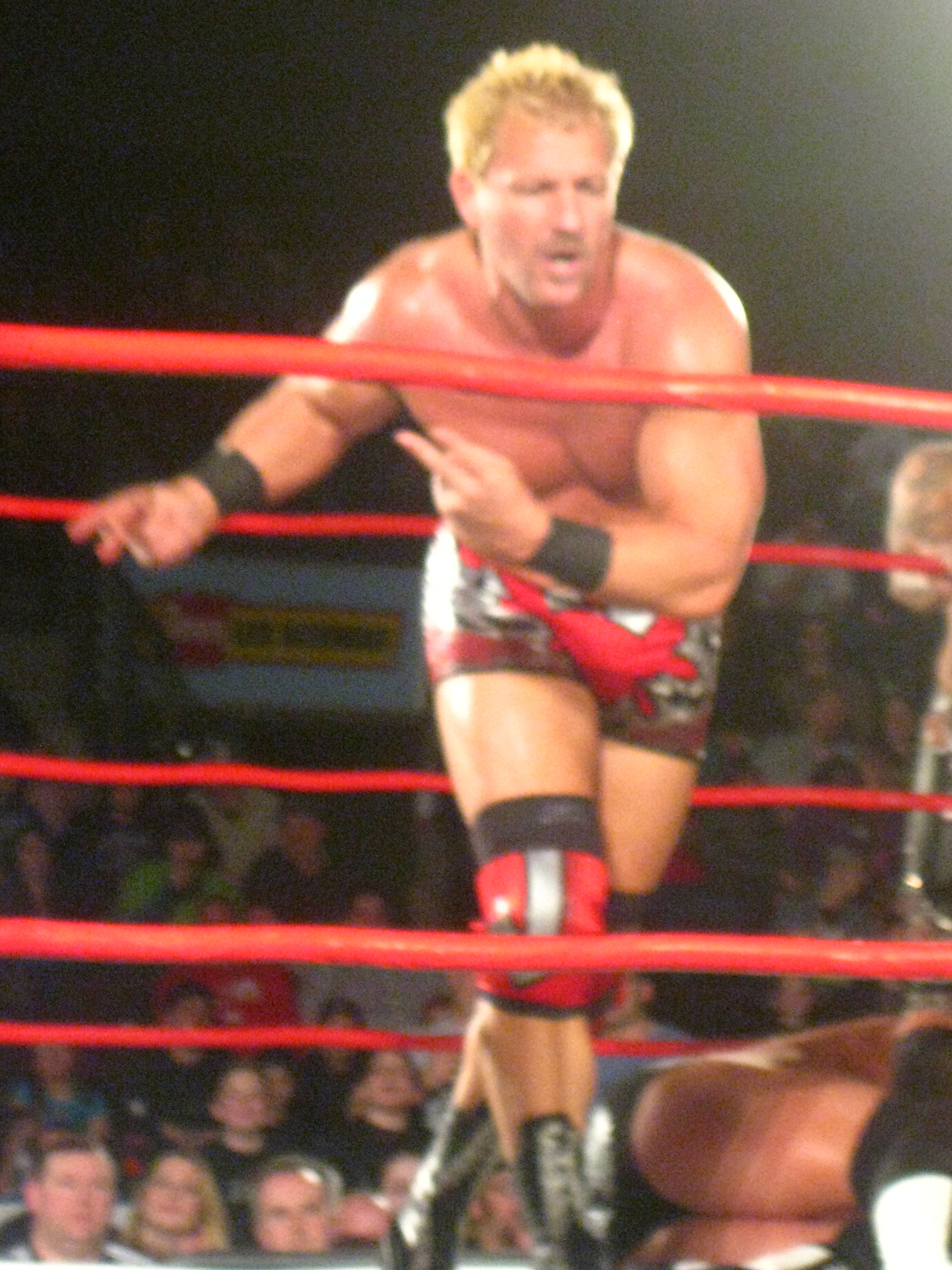
Jeff Jarrett defended the NWA World Heavyweight Championship against A.J. Styles at Hard Justice.

The main event was a contest for the NWA World Heavyweight Championship between then-champion, Jeff Jarrett, and the challenger, A.J. Styles, with Tito Ortiz as Special Guest Referee. On the April 8 episode of TNA's television program TNA Impact!, Director of Authority (DOA) Dusty Rhodes announced that the winner of the planned bout between Styles and Abyss in a Six Sides of Steel Cage match at TNA's Lockdown PPV event on April 24, 2005, would earn a championship match at Hard Justice. Styles went on to defeat Abyss at Lockdown, thus becoming the number one contender. DOA Rhodes announced on the April 29, 2005, episode of Impact! that the match was official and that Ortiz would be special guest referee for the bout. TNA held a sit-down interview conducted by TNA commentator Mike Tenay between Styles and Jarrett on the May 6 episode of Impact!. The match was promoted heading into the event with a video package highlighting the strengths of Styles' in-ring ability against Jarrett's history as champion on the May 13 episode of Impact!.

A Twenty-Man Gauntlet for the Gold to determine the number contender to the NWA World Heavyweight Championship was held at Hard Justice. The match was announced on the April 29 episode of Impact! by DOA Rhodes. In a Gauntlet for the Gold, two wrestlers start the bout, with more entering at time intervals, in which the point is to eliminate the opponent by throwing them over the top rope and to the floor. When the match is down to two wrestlers, a standard match is held, with the winner being the one to gain the pinfall or submission. On the May 6 episode of Impact!, Abyss was announced as a participant in the match. TNA held a Ten-Man Gauntlet on the May 13 episode of Impact! to determine the first and final entrants in the match, with the first eliminated in the match entering first while the winner being the last entrant. Abyss, Bobby Roode, David Young, A-1, Chris Sabin, Petey Williams, Lance Hoyt, Michael Shane, Trytan, and Apolo all participated in the bout, with Roode being the first eliminated and Abyss winning the contest.

The TNA X Division Championship was defended by Christopher Daniels against Shocker at Hard Justice. At Lockdown, Shocker defeated Chris Sabin, Michael Shane, and Sonjay Dutt to win the first-ever Xscape match. On the April 29 episode of Impact!, it was announced that Daniels would defend the championship against Shocker at the PPV event. The match was promoted on the basis of Shocker having wrestled for numerous promotions across the world, garnering extensive fame in Mexico, and Daniels' having to defend against an international star of this level.

The Naturals (Andy Douglas and Chase Stevens) defended the NWA World Tag Team Championship against America's Most Wanted (Chris Harris and James Storm) (AMW) in another featured match on the card. The Naturals, accompanied by Chris Candido, defeated then-tag team champions AMW in a non-title match on the April 22 episode of Impact!. On the April 29 episode of Impact!, The Naturals defeated AMW to win the tag team championship with help from Candido. The match was announced for Hard Justice on the May 6 episode of Impact!.

Raven versus Jeff Hardy in a Clockwork Orange House of Fun match was promoted for the event. The feud behind this match began on the March 25 episode of Impact!, when Raven offered Hardy an alliance which he refused. Raven attacked Hardy during a confrontation between Abyss and Hardy on the April 1 episode of Impact!. This led to a Six Sides of Steel Tables match at Lockdown, which Hardy won. It was announced on the May 13 episode of Impact! Raven and Hardy would face in a Clockwork Orange House of Fun match at Hard Justice.

== Event ==
Other on-screen personnel
Role:	Name:
Commentator	Mike Tenay
Commentator	Don West
Ring announcer	Jeremy Borash
Referee	Rudy Charles
Referee	Mark "Slick" Johnson
Referee	Andrew Thomas
Interviewers	Jeremy Borash
Interviewers	Shane Douglas

=== Pre-Show ===
Prior to the event's commencement, TNA held a thirty-minute pre-show. It featured a six-minute and twenty-eight second bout between Shark Boy and David Young in which the winner earned entry into the Gauntlet for the Gold later in the night. Shark Boy ended up gaining the pinfall in the contest after driving Young into the mat back-first using his signature maneuver the Dead Sea Drop. During the show, it was announced that Sean Waltman would be replacing Jeff Hardy as Raven's opponent in the Clockwork Orange House of Fun match due to Hardy not arriving in time for the event.

=== On-air employees ===
The event featured employees other than the wrestlers involved in the matches. Mike Tenay and Don West were the commentators for the telecast. Jeremy Borash and David Penzer were ring announcers for the event. Andrew Thomas, Rudy Charles, and Mark "Slick" Johnson participated as referees for the encounters. Terry Taylor and Tenay were used as an interviewers during the event; Taylor was also used during the pre-show. Besides employees appearing in a wrestling role, Coach D'Amore, A-1, Tito Ortiz, David Young, Phi Delta Slam (Bruno Sassi and Big Tilly), and Dusty Rhodes all appeared on camera, either in backstage or ringside segments. Borash, West, Tenay, Taylor, and TNA ring girl SoCal Val all appeared during the pre-show for the event.

=== Preliminary matches ===
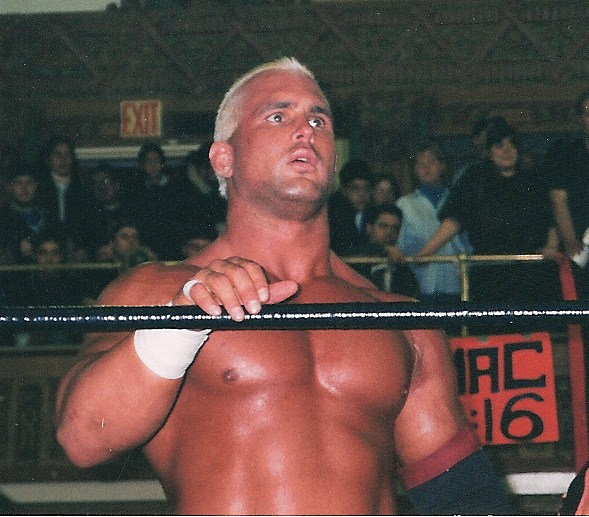
Hard Justice opened with a tribute to Chris Candido.

The event opened with a ten-bell salute to Chris Candido while a photo of Candido, a pair of boots, and one-half of the NWA World Tag Team Championship positioned on a steel chair sat in the center of the ring.

The first match to take place at Hard Justice involved Team Canada (Petey Williams and Eric Young), who were accompanied by Coach D'Amore, taking on the team of Apolo and Sonny Siaki. The duration of the encounter was eight minutes and six seconds. Team Canada gained the victory after A-1 interfered in the contest and performed a suplex on Siaki while the referee was distracted by D'Amore, then placed an unconscious Williams on top of Siaki for the pinfall.

A Mixed Tag Team match between the team of Michael Shane and Trinity and the team of Chris Sabin and Traci was held next. The match lasted ten minutes and nineteen seconds. In the final moments of the bout, Traci hit Sabin in the groin and Shane kicked Trinity in the face, which allowed Shane to gain the pinfall on Sabin. After Traci and Shane betrayed their partners, they united an alliance of their own.

Raven fought Sean Waltman in a Clockwork Orange House of Fun match. A Clockwork Orange House of Fun match is held under no disqualification rules, involving multiple types of weapons including part of a steel cage. Waltman scored a near-fall after jumping off the pillars holding up the cage and performing a somersault leg drop onto Raven through a table. Raven won the bout after throwing Waltman into the cage causing it to collapse, Raven then followed with a pinfall victory at thirteen minutes.

Monty Brown and The Outlaw fought Diamond Dallas Page and Ron Killings in the fourth match of the night. This was originally promoted with B.G. James as Page's partner, however prior to the contest it was announced during an interview with Page that James was having travel issues and Killings offered to be his replacement, which Page accepted. The encounter lasted eight minutes and fifty-five seconds. Brown gained the pinfall after performing his signature maneuver the Pounce following interference from Phi Delta Slam (Bruno Sassi and Big Tilly).

=== Main event matches ===
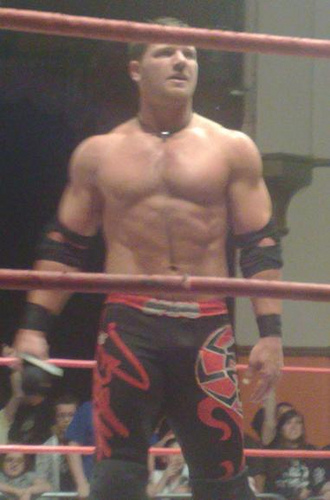
A.J. Styles defeated Jeff Jarrett at Hard Justice to win the NWA World Heavyweight Championship.

The Naturals (Andy Douglas and Chase Stevens) defended the NWA World Tag Team Championship against America's Most Wanted (Chris Harris and James Storm) in a bout which lasted fourteen minutes and ten seconds. The Naturals retained the title after Stevens scored the pinfall while using the ropes for leverage.

The TNA X Division Championship was defend by Christopher Daniels against Shocker in the sixth encounter. The duration of the match was eleven minutes and fifty-eight seconds. In the final moments, Shocker went for a suplex off the top of a padded turnbuckle, however Daniels countered the move and instead performed his signature maneuver the Angel Wings to retain the X Division Championship.

The Twenty-Man Gauntlet for the Gold to become number one contender to the NWA World Heavyweight Championship was held, involving Abyss, Bobby Roode, Zach Gowen, Eric Young, Cassidy Riley, Elix Skipper, Shark Boy, A-1, Chris Sabin, Petey Williams, Sonny Siaki, Lance Hoyt, Michael Shane, Jerrelle Clarke, Mikey Batts, The Outlaw, Trytan, Ron Killings, Apolo, and B.G. James. The first entrant was Roode, while the second was Gowen, who began the encounter. Abyss was the last entrant. Gowen was the first eliminated by Shark Boy. The Outlaw and James were the lasted eliminated simultaneously by Abyss, before it became a standard bout between Abyss and Killings. Killings bashed a steel chair over Abyss' head to gain a near-fall. Abyss went on to win after Killings jumped off the top turnbuckle and Abyss countered it into his signature maneuver the Black Hole Slam to become number one contender to the NWA World Heavyweight Championship at twenty-six minutes and forty-five seconds.

The main event was a standard match for the NWA World Heavyweight Championship, in which then-champion Jeff Jarrett defended the title against A.J. Styles with Tito Ortiz as Special Guest Referee. During the bout, Jarrett tried to use his signature guitar as a weapon, however was stopped by Ortiz. Styles instead tried to use it, but was also stopped by Ortiz. Styles then broke the guitar, preventing it from being used as a weapon. Jarrett earned a near-fall after performing Styles' own signature maneuver the Styles Clash. Later, Styles also gained a near-fall after performing Jarrett's own signature maneuver The Stroke. In the final minutes, Monty Brown interfered in the contest, performing the Pounce on Jarrett after Styles pushed him into Brown's path. While Ortiz was distracted by Brown, Styles covered Jarrett for a pin. Another referee came to make the count, however was stopped by Ortiz. This allowed Jarrett to hit Styles in the groin and place him on the top of a padded turnbuckle. A few moments later, Ortiz knocked Jarrett out after Jarrett shoved Ortiz, which allowed Styles to move from one turnbuckle to another, he then performed his Spiral Tap maneuver. Styles followed with the pinfall victory at nineteen minutes and thirty seconds to become the new NWA World Heavyweight Champion for the third time.

== Reception ==
A total of 775 people attended the event. Canadian Online Explorer writer Jason Clevett felt the event was the "most entertaining pay per view from TNA since January's Final Resolution." Clevett rated the main event, the X Division Championship match, and the Clockwork Orange House of Fun match each an 8 out of 10. The Gauntlet for the Gold and the NWA World Tag Team Championship defense were each rated a 7 out of 10. Wade Keller of the Pro Wrestling Torch rated the main event and the Clockwork Orange House of Fun match 3 and a fourth stars out of 5. Regarding the main event, Keller felt it was a "PPV main event worthy match, the best of the night, but when a 20 minute Styles main event PPV match isn't four stars, it's not Styles's fault." As for the Clockwork Orange House of Fun match, Keller felt it was a "good garbage match" and that Waltman was a "suitable substitution for the Hardy no-show." Keller rated the Gauntlet for the Gold and the X Division Championship match each 2 and three-quarter stars out of 5. He stated that the Gauntlet for the Gold was "above-average", but that it felt "clogged with undersized wrestlers who didn't look like legit contenders, exposing TNA's roster depth limitations in the heavyweight division." While reporting on the X Division Championship bout, that it "never felt special, but it was always good." TNA released a DVD counting down the top 50 moments in their history in 2007, with Styles defeating Jarrett for the NWA World Heavyweight Championship at number 7.

== Aftermath ==
It was reported following Hard Justice that Shane Douglas was originally supposed to handle interview duties for the show, but came down with the stomach flu and was replaced by Terry Taylor. Also, that Jeff Hardy missed multiple flights causing him to arrive after the conclusion of the show. Hardy was subsequently suspended for this and past instances of no-showing events. Abyss and Ron Killings were the only ones to receive injuries at Hard Justice. Abyss was given a fairly deep cut on the top of his head from being bashed with a steel chair by Killings that required stitches. Meanwhile, Killings cracked his front teeth after falling face-first onto a steel chair.

After Hard Justice, Jeff Jarrett demanded a rematch for the NWA World Heavyweight Championship at TNA's Slammiversary PPV event on June 19 against Styles on the May 20 episode of Impact!. Director of Authority Dusty Rhodes granted Jarrett his rematch, however made it a King of the Mountain match also involving Monty Brown, new number one contender Abyss, and a mystery "wild card" opponent. At Slammiversary, Jarrett was arrested during the pre-show for assaulting a fan in the storyline and replaced by Raven. Raven went on to win the NWA World Heavyweight Championship, defeating Styles, Brown, Abyss, and Sean Waltman.

Reigning TNA X Division Champion Christopher Daniels went on to Slammiversary to defend the title in a Three Way Elimination match against Chris Sabin and Michael Shane. Shane attacked and demanded a championship match against Daniels on the May 20 episode of Impact!, before Sabin intervened and attacked Shane, leading to a brawl between all three wrestlers. The match was announced on the May 27 episode of Impact!. Daniels retained the championship at Slammiversary.

On the May 20 episode of Impact!, Team Canada (Eric Young and Petey Williams) defeated America's Most Wanted (Chris Harris and James Storm) to become number one contenders to the NWA World Tag Team Championship. The Naturals (Andy Douglas and Chase Stevens) went on to successfully defend the NWA World Tag Team Championship against Team Canada at Slammiversary.

== Results ==
No.	Results	Stipulations	Times
1^{P}	Shark Boy defeated David Young	Singles match for entry in the Gauntlet for the Gold	6:28
2	Team Canada (Eric Young and Petey Williams) (with Coach D'Amore) defeated Apolo and Sonny Siaki	Tag team match	8:06
3	Michael Shane and Trinity defeated Chris Sabin and Traci	Mixed Tag Team match	10:19
4	Raven defeated Sean Waltman	Clockwork Orange House of Fun match	13:00
5	Monty Brown and The Outlaw defeated Diamond Dallas Page and Ron Killings	Tag team match	8:55
6	The Naturals (Andy Douglas and Chase Stevens) (c) defeated America's Most Wanted (Chris Harris and James Storm)	Tag team match for the NWA World Tag Team Championship	14:10
7	Christopher Daniels (c) defeated Shocker	Singles match for the TNA X Division Championship	11:58
8	Abyss won by last eliminating Ron Killings^{1}	Twenty-Man Gauntlet for the Gold to determine the #1 contender to the NWA World Heavyweight Championship	26:45
9	A.J. Styles defeated Jeff Jarrett (c)	Singles match for the NWA World Heavyweight Championship with Tito Ortiz as special guest referee	19:30
(c) / – the champion(s) heading into the match; P / – the match was broadcast on the pre-show

=== Gauntlet for the Gold entrances and eliminations ===
1.

Entry order	Entrant	Elimination order	Eliminated by
1	Bobby Roode	13	Lance Hoyt
2	Zach Gowen	1	Shark Boy
3	Eric Young	5	Lance Hoyt
4	Cassidy Riley	3	Eric Young
5	Elix Skipper	4	Bobby Roode
6	Shark Boy	2	A-1
7	A-1	16	B.G. James and The Outlaw
8	Chris Sabin	7	Himself
9	Petey Williams	15	B.G. James and The Outlaw
10	Sonny Siaki	8	A-1, Bobby Roode and Petey Williams
11	Lance Hoyt	14	A-1 and Bobby Roode
12	Michael Shane	6	Chris Sabin
13	Jerrelle Clarke	9	Petey Williams
14	Mikey Batts	10	The Outlaw
15	The Outlaw	17	Abyss
16	Trytan	11	A-1, Bobby Roode and Petey Williams
17	Ron Killings	19	Abyss by Pinfall
18	Apolo	12	Himself and The Outlaw
19	B.G. James	18	Abyss
20	Abyss	Winner	N/A
