= TNA Sacrifice (2005) =

2005 Total Nonstop Action Wrestling pay-per-view event

Sacrifice (2005)
- Promotional poster featuring Raven
- Promotion: Total Nonstop Action Wrestling
- Date: August 14, 2005
- City: Orlando, Florida
- Venue: Impact Zone
- Attendance: 775
- Tagline: "Pain"

Pay-per-view chronology
← Previous; No Surrender	Next → Unbreakable

Sacrifice chronology
← Previous; First	Next → 2006

The 2005 Sacrifice was a professional wrestling pay-per-view (PPV) event produced by the Total Nonstop Action Wrestling (TNA) promotion that took place on August 14, 2005 at the TNA Impact! Zone in Orlando, Florida. It was the first show of the Sacrifice series and eighth event in the 2005 TNA PPV schedule. Nine professional wrestling matches and one pre-show match were featured on the card.

Ten matches were contested at the event. In the main event, Jeff Jarrett and Rhino defeated Raven and Sabu. In other prominent matches, Samoa Joe defeated AJ Styles in the finals of the 2005 TNA Super X Cup Tournament, Jerry Lynn defeated Sean Waltman and in an Internet dream match, Christopher Daniels defeated Austin Aries.

Corey David Lacroix of the professional wrestling section of the Canadian Online Explorer posted a review of the gathering, stating he felt "there was not a single bad match" on the card

== Production ==
=== Background ===
TNA issued a press release in May 2005 announcing that they would be holding a PPV titled Sacrifice on August 14 at the TNA Impact! Zone in Orlando, Florida. TNA created a section covering the event on their website. TNA released a poster prior featuring Raven and the tagline "Pain". TNA produced a thirty-minute pre-show for Sacrifice featuring the team of Apolo and Sonny Siaki against the team of Jerrelle Clark and Mikey Batts. An "Internet Dream match" was promoted for the event. It consisted on a poll to determine then-TNA X Division Champion Christopher Daniels' opponent in a non-title bout. Austin Aries, Jay Lethal, and Roderick Strong were the choices in the poll; Aries won, thus setting up Daniels versus Aries.

=== Storylines ===
Sacrifice featured nine professional wrestling matches and one pre-show match that involved wrestlers from pre-existing scripted feuds and storylines portraying villains, heroes, or less distinguishable characters; these scripted events built tension and culminated in a wrestling match or series of matches.

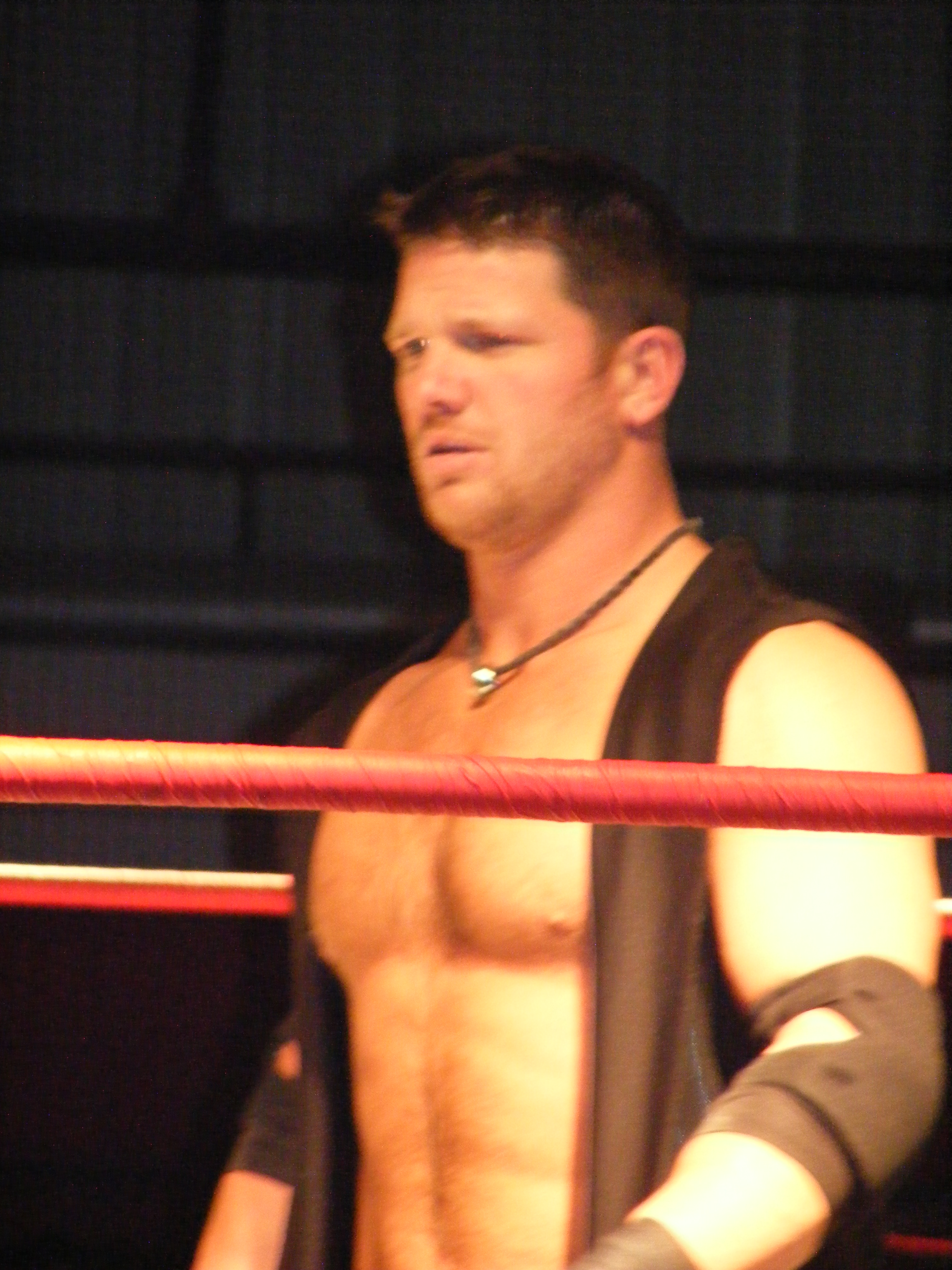
A.J. Styles (pictured) competed in the 2005 TNA Super X Cup Tournament, making it all the way to the Finals against Samoa Joe at Sacrifice.

The main event at Sacrifice was a Tag Team match between the team of Jeff Jarrett and Rhino and the team of Raven and Sabu. This match was the result of an existing rivalry between Raven and Jarrett over the NWA World Heavyweight Championship which Raven held. At TNA's previous PPV event No Surrender on July 17, Raven defeated Abyss in a No Surrender Dog Collar match to retain the NWA World Heavyweight Championship. After the encounter, Jarrett distracted Raven, allowing Rhino to attack Raven from behind. On the July 22 episode of TNA's television program TNA Impact!, Jarrett and Rhino claimed that Raven had no allies to help defend himself before they physically assaulted him. Cassidy Riley had previously pledged allegiance to Raven, even aiding Raven in his match at No Surrender. During the July 29 episode of Impact!, Rhino and Jarrett attacked Riley, believing he would aid Raven in some way. Afterwards, Raven announced he had chosen a partner to team with him to face Jarrett and Rhino at Sacrifice. Sabu then made his TNA return revealing himself as Raven's partner by attacking Jarrett and Rhino.

The Finals of the 2005 TNA Super X Cup Tournament were scheduled for Sacrifice. Over the weeks leading up to Sacrifice on Impact!, TNA held the eight-man single-elimination tournament to decide which two would compete for the 2005 Super X Cup trophy and who would earn a future TNA X Division Championship match. A.J. Styles, Alex Shelley, Chris Sabin, Matt Bentley, Petey Williams, Samoa Joe, Shocker, and Sonjay Dutt all competed in the tournament. Joe defeated Dutt, Shelley defeated Shocker, Styles defeated Bentley, and Williams defeated Sabin in the Quarterfinals on the respective July 22 and July 29 episodes of Impact! to advance to the Semifinals. In the Semifinals, Joe defeated Shelley and Styles defeated Williams to advance to the Finals at Sacrifice on the August 5 and August 10 episodes of Impact!, respectively. With their victories, Joe versus Styles in the 2005 TNA Super X Cup Tournament Final was scheduled for Sacrifice.

Jerry Lynn versus Sean Waltman was also promoted for Sacrifice. At No Surrender, Lynn was Special Guest Referee for a bout between Styles and Waltman, which Styles won after aid from Lynn. TNA created a storyline from this and Lynn and Waltman's past real-life friendship. On the July 22 episode of Impact!, Waltman accused Lynn of trying to steal his spotlight in a backstage segment, while Lynn took credit for Waltman's success. Lynn argued that he was the one who helped get Waltman into the industry as well as early success thanks to a critically acclaimed series of matches the two had in the past. The segment ended with Waltman challenging Lynn to a match at Sacrifice, which Lynn accepted. This bout was also promoted as a clash between two pioneers of TNA's X Division style.

At No Surrender, the team of Kip James and Monty Brown fought the 3Live Kru (Konnan and Ron Killings) in a Tag Team Street Fight. Brown and Kip won the encounter, however, during the bout Kip assaulted several TNA personnel. As such, a storyline developed in which referees refused to participate in future encounters involving Kip. After a rematch between the two teams was announced for Sacrifice on the July 22 episode of Impact!, a segment took place between referees Andrew Thomas, Rudy Charles, and Mark "Slick" Johnson and NWA Championship Committee member Larry Zbyszko. In the segment, each refused to referee the bout at Sacrifice, telling Zbyszko he would need to find a replacement. Former 3Live Kru member B.G. James was appointed the Special Guest Referee by Zbyszko for the bout at Sacrifice on the July 29 episode of Impact!.

== Event ==
Other on-screen personnel
Role:	Name:
Commentator	Mike Tenay
Commentator	Don West
Ring announcer	Jeremy Borash
Referee	Rudy Charles
Referee	Mark "Slick" Johnson
Referee	Andrew Thomas
Interviewers	Jeremy Borash
Interviewers	Shane Douglas

=== Pre-show ===
TNA held a thirty-minute pre-show prior to the event, during which the team of Apolo and Sonny Siaki defeated the team of Jerrelle Clark and Mikey Batts in a bout lasting 4 minutes and 27 seconds. A segment took place on the pre-show between Larry Zbyszko, Jeff Jarrett, and TNA commentator Mike Tenay, in which Jarrett questioned Zbyszko on whether he would earn a future NWA World Heavyweight Championship match if he pinned Raven during the main event. Zbyszko agreed he would earn the title shot, however, adding if Raven pinned Jarrett then Jarrett would not have a title match for a full year.

=== Miscellaneous ===
Sacrifice, as well as the pre-show, featured employees other than the wrestlers involved in the matches. Mike Tenay and Don West were the commentators for the telecast. Jeremy Borash (for the 2005 TNA Super X Cup Finals only) and David Penzer were ring announcers for the event. Andrew Thomas, Rudy Charles, and Mark "Slick" Johnson participated as referees for the encounters. Shane Douglas handled the interview duties for the event. Besides employees who appeared in a wrestling role, Cassidy Riley, James Mitchell, Jimmy Hart, and Zbyszko all appeared on camera, either in backstage or in ringside segments.

=== Preliminary matches ===
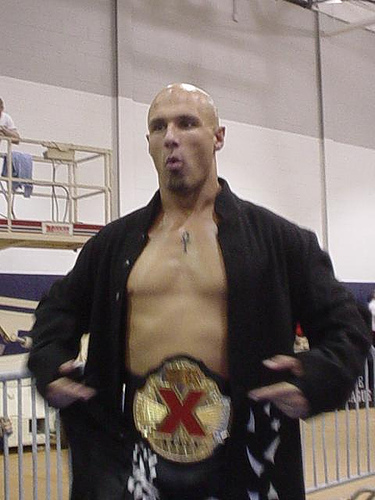
Christopher Daniels (pictured with the TNA X Division Championship belt) defeated Austin Aries at Sacrifice

A six-man tag team match pitting the team of Chris Sabin, Shark Boy, and Sonjay Dutt against The Diamonds in the Rough (Elix Skipper, David Young, and Simon Diamond) was the first bout of the telecast. Its duration was 7 minutes and 21 seconds. Sabin won the encounter for his team by pinning Skipper with a small package pin.

Alex Shelley fought Shocker in the second match on the show. Shelley won the contest with a roll-up pin with his feet on the ropes for leverage at 8 minutes and 50 seconds.

Abyss, who was accompanied by James Mitchell, versus Lance Hoyt was the following encounter. It lasted 9 minutes and 9 seconds. Mitchell interfered in the bout by handing Abyss a steel chair, which was taken by the referee before Abyss could use it. Hoyt gained a near-fall after kicking the chair into Abyss' face. Abyss also gained a near-fall after slamming Hoyt back-first into the mat with his signature Black Hole Slam maneuver. Hoyt earned another near-fall by laying a steel chair across Abyss' chest while Abyss laid in one of the six turnbuckle corners, then jumping off the opposing ring ropes and dropkicking the steel chair into Abyss' chest. Abyss won the contest after performing the Black Hole Slam.

A Tag Team match with B.G. James as Special Guest Referee between the 3Live Kru (Konnan and Ron Killings) and the team of Kip James and Monty Brown was next. It lasted 7 minutes and 45 seconds. Konnan took off his shoe during the match and began to use it as a weapon. He attempted to throw it at Brown and Kip, however, he accidentally struck B.G. in the process. Later, Kip attempted to attack Konnan with a steel chair but was stopped by B.G. Kip in returned shoved B.G., which caused B.G. to punch Kip in retaliation. Konnan then grabbed the chair and bashed Kip over the head with it to score the pinfall victory for his team.

In the fifth match, Christopher Daniels fought Austin Aries in what was promoted as the Internet Dream match. Daniels and Aries each gained several near-falls during the encounter. Daniels won the contest by slamming Aries face-first against the mat with his signature Angel Wings maneuver at 9 minutes and 35 seconds.

=== Main event matches ===
In the next scheduled match Jerry Lynn faced Sean Waltman. The contest duration was 15 minutes and 31 seconds. During the bout while Lynn stood on the ring apron, Waltman attempted to suplex him back into the ring, however, Lynn countered and instead suplexed Waltman over the ring ropes and down to the floor. Waltman scored a near-fall following a groin hit and slamming Lynn's face into the mat with his signature X-Factor maneuver. Chris Sabin, Shark Boy, and Sonjay Dutt came from the backstage area to view this encounter from ringside. Lynn gained the pinfall on Waltman after countering a scoop powerslam into a victory roll pin. Following the bout, Waltman and Lynn shook hands and hugged in a display of mutual respect. This instead was a trick by Waltman, allowing him to attack Lynn and bash Lynn's arm with a steel chair while it was draped over the ring apron until Dutt, Sabin, and Shark Boy came to Lynn's aid.

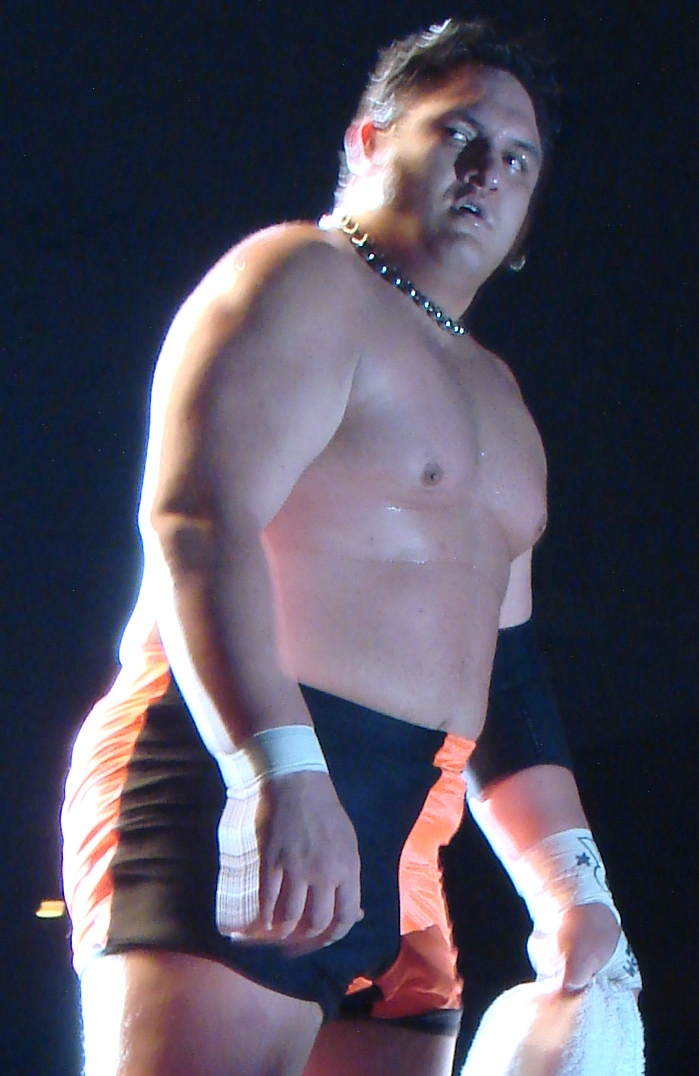
Samoa Joe (pictured) defeated A.J. Styles in the Finals of the 2005 TNA Super X Cup Tournament at Sacrifice to win the Tournament.

TNA held an Eight Man Tag Team match pitting the team of America's Most Wanted (Chris Harris and James Storm) and The Naturals (Andy Douglas and Chase Stevens), who were accompanied by Jimmy Hart, against Team Canada (A-1, Bobby Roode, Eric Young, and Petey Williams). A brawl ensued during the bout after The Naturals performed their signature Natural Disaster tag team maneuver on Young. This resulted in A-1, Douglas, Storm, Young, and Williams fighting at the ringside area until Harris jumped off the top of a padded turnbuckle onto the group with a splash. Williams attempted to bash Storm with a hockey stick, but missed allowing Storm to toss him to the floor. Meanwhile, Roode scored the pinfall on Stevens with a small package pin while holding his tights for leverage at 11 minutes and 11 seconds.

The Finals of the 2005 TNA Super X Cup Tournament was next between A.J. Styles and Samoa Joe. The duration of the encounter was 15 minutes and 15 seconds. Christopher Daniels provided commentary for this contest, due to him labeling the tournament the Christopher Daniels Invitational and being the TNA X Division Champion at the time. The winner of this match won the silver Super X Cup trophy and became number one contender to the TNA X Division Championship, earning a title match against Daniels at TNA's Unbreakable PPV event on September 11. In the beginning while Styles was laying against the ring ropes, Joe ran across the ring and kicked him in the face, causing him to fly out of the ring and crash against the floor. Joe then followed by diving through the ring ropes and smashing Styles in the face with his forearm once Styles reached his feet. Later, Styles held Joe on his shoulders before twisting him off into a powerbomb for what he calls a Rack Bomb. However, during the move referee Andrew Thomas was knocked unconscious after being kicked in the face, which allowed Daniels to interfere in the contest attacking Styles and attempting to attack Joe with the X Division Title belt before Styles threw Daniels from the ring. Joe followed by lifting Styles up and performing his signature Muscle Buster maneuver by slamming Styles back and neck-first into the mat before placing Styles in his signature Coquina Clutch submission hold. Once the referee came too Styles submitted to the move, giving the victory to Joe and thus Joe winning the 2005 TNA Super X Cup Tournament and a X Division Championship match at Unbreakable.

The main event was a Tag Team match pitting the team of Jeff Jarrett and Rhino against the team of Raven and Sabu. An added stipulation to this bout was if Jarrett pinned Raven he would earn a future NWA World Heavyweight Championship match, however, if Raven pinned Jarrett then he would not garner one for an entire year. Despite this match being under standard tag team rules in which there are disqualifications and count outs, the participants used weapons and fought outside the ring for an extended period. In the beginning, Raven used a pizza cutter to cut open Jarrett's forehead, causing him to bleed. Both teams used trashcans and steel chairs during the bout. Abyss interfered in the bout attacking Sabu by throwing him over the top rope and through a table at ringside. Jeff Hardy then interfered in the match attacking Jarrett and Rhino with a steel chair. Hardy then performed his signature Twist of Fate maneuver by forcing Jarrett's face into the mat. He followed by doing a front-flip splash off the top of a padded turnbuckle. Afterwards, Raven covered Jarrett for a two count. Rhino gained the pinfall at 16 minutes and 23 seconds on Raven after tackling Raven with his signature Gore maneuver through a table.

== Reception ==
A total of 775 people attended Sacrifice. Canadian Online Explorer writer Corey David Lacroix felt "there was not a single bad match" on the show. Lacorix also commented saying "With less than two months before they make their national debut on Spike TV, Total Nonstop Action needed to show everyone in the wrestling business that they are prepared to do what needs to be done to elevate their product above everyone else. Last night at TNA's Sacrifice pay per view the promotion clearly did so, showing everyone they have a vision and are willing and able to take it to a new level of intensity." Lacroix rated the main event and Jerry Lynn versus Sean Waltman a 7.5 out of 10. The Super X Cup Finals and the Abyss versus Lance Hoyt bouts were each rated an 8 out of 10, which were his highest ratings of the review. His lowest went to the 3Live Kru versus Kip James and Monty Brown Tag Team match, with 4 out of 10. Speaking on the main event, Lacorix felt it was a "well-executed, high-octane, hardcore match with all four giving a good performance." Lacorix believed that the Super X Cup Finals "could have been a certified Match of the Year contender if someone in the back had not decided to make Daniels interfere in this contest." He went on to state the match "was a thing of beauty that got stained."

Wade Keller of the Pro Wrestling Torch rated the main event and the Christopher Daniels versus Austin Aries encounter three and a quarter stars out of five. Regarding the main event, Keller felt it was a "good chaotic bag-o-tricks match." As for the Daniels versus Aries, Keller stated "it was very good." Keller's highest rating of his review went to the Super X Cup Finals with four and a quarter stars out of five, which Keller believed was a "four star match that was begging to be given an extra ten minutes to be a match of the year candidate." Meanwhile, the Lynn versus Waltman bout was ranked three and three-quarters stars out of five, with Keller stating it was a "very smartly executed match, which told a story without the frenetic pace of so many TNA spotfests – yet it still had enough good highspots to not feel old fashioned or conservative."

== Aftermath ==
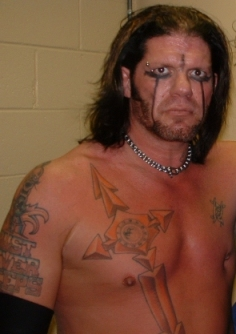
Raven (pictured) fought Rhino in a Raven's Rules match for the NWA World Heavyweight Championship at Unbreakable.

A.J. Styles received a tendon injury during his bout with Samoa Joe at Sacrifice. TNA Management did not have him wrestle on the proceeding Impact! tapings, hoping to keep him rested in order to not chance any further injury despite the belief in him not expecting to be sidelined long. Styles, however, was forced to cancel a scheduled appearance for the Ring of Honor promotion on August 20, but appeared for the promotion the following week on August 27 at their Dragon's Gate Invasion event in a losing effort against CIMA. On the August 19 episode of Impact!, it was announced Jerry Lynn received a shoulder injury from Waltman's attack following their bout, and would be sidelined for at least one month in the storyline.

After winning the 2005 TNA Super X Cup Tournament, Joe was scheduled to face Christopher Daniels for the TNA X Division Championship at TNA's next PPV event Unbreakable. However, Styles ended up assaulting Daniels on the August 19 episode of Impact!, as revenge for Daniels' interference at Sacrifice. Daniels demanded Styles be suspended due to the attack, but the request was declined by NWA Championship Committee member Larry Zbyszko. Instead Zbyszko added Styles to the contest at Unbreakable on the August 26 episode of Impact!, thus making it a Three Way match for the TNA X Division Championship. Styles ended up gaining the pinfall on Daniels during the main event of the show, thus winning the championship.

Following Sacrifice, TNA announced on their website that Rhino was considered the new number one contender to the NWA World Heavyweight Championship. On the August 19 episode of Impact!, Mike Tenay announced that Raven and Rhino would face for the title at Unbreakable. At the event, the match was given a Raven's Rule stipulation, which aided Raven in retaining the championship as he pinned Rhino to win the encounter.

Abyss and Sabu engaged in a rivalry following the event, with the two facing in a No Disqualification match at Unbreakable, which Abyss won. The two then fought in a Four Way Monster's Ball match, also involving Rhino and Jeff Hardy, at TNA's Bound for Glory PPV event on October 23. Rhino won the contest at the gathering. At TNA's Genesis PPV event on November 13, Abyss and Sabu fought in another No Disqualification match, with Abyss coming out the victor. The two ended their rivalry at TNA's Turning Point PPV event on December 11, where Sabu defeated Abyss in the first-ever Barbed Wire Massacre.

TNA held The Chris Candido Memorial Tag Team Tournament in the weeks leading up to Unbreakable. It involved eight randomly assigned teams, with the team of Alex Shelley and Sean Waltman defeating Chris Sabin and Shocker in the Finals on the September 9 episode of Impact!. Due to winning the tournament, Shelley and Waltman gained entry into a Four Way Elimination match for the NWA World Tag Team Championship at Unbreakable which also involved then-champions The Naturals (Andy Douglas and Chase Stevens), America's Most Wanted (Chris Harris and James Storm), and Team Canada (A-1 and Eric Young). Waltman ended up missing the event for unknown reasons, with Chris Candido's legitimate brother Johnny Candido taking Waltman's place as Shelley's partner. The Naturals ended up retaining the championship at the event.

The feud between the 3Live Kru (B.G. James, Konnan, and Ron Killings) and Kip James and Monty Brown ended following Sacrifice. The 3Live Kru went on to defeat The Diamonds in the Rough (David Young, Elix Skipper, and Simon Diamond) at Unbreakable, while Brown and Kip defeated Apolo and Lance Hoyt at the show.

TNA Management were impressed with Aries' performance in his match with Daniels at the gathering that they stated they wished to bring him in for another match down the line. This led to Aries facing another non-TNA contracted wrestler Roderick Strong at Unbreakable, which Aries won.

== Results ==
No.	Results	Stipulations	Times
1^{P}	Apolo and Sonny Siaki defeated Jerrelle Clark and Mikey Batts	Tag team match	4:27
2	Chris Sabin, Shark Boy, and Sonjay Dutt defeated Elix Skipper, Simon Diamond, and David Young	Six-man tag team match	7:21
3	Alex Shelley defeated Shocker	Singles match	8:50
4	Abyss (with James Mitchell) defeated Lance Hoyt	Singles match	9:09
5	3Live Kru (Ron Killings and Konnan) defeated Kip James and Monty Brown	Tag team match with B.G. James as the Special Guest Referee	7:45
6	Christopher Daniels defeated Austin Aries	Singles match	9:35
7	Jerry Lynn defeated Sean Waltman	Singles match	15:31
8	Team Canada (A-1, Bobby Roode, Eric Young and Petey Williams) defeated America's Most Wanted (Chris Harris and James Storm), and The Naturals (Andy Douglas and Chase Stevens) (with Jimmy Hart)	Eight-man tag team match	11:11
9	Samoa Joe defeated A.J. Styles	2005 TNA Super X Cup Tournament Final; Since Samoa Joe won the Super X Cup, he earned an TNA X Division Championship match at Unbreakable.	15:15
10	Jeff Jarrett and Rhino defeated Raven and Sabu	Tag team match; Since Rhino pinned Raven, he earned an NWA World Heavyweight Championship match at Unbreakable, if Jarrett scored the pinfall on Raven he earned an NWA World Heavyweight Championship match at Unbreakable, however, if Raven pinned Jarrett then Jarrett would not receive a title match for an entire year.	16:23
P / – the match was broadcast on the pre-show

Tournament bracket

Quarterfinals (TV – TNA Impact!)
Samoa Joe	Submission
Sonjay Dutt	9:32
Alex Shelley	Pinfall
Shocker	5:28
A.J. Styles	Pinfall
Matt Bentley	10:53
Chris Sabin	11:45
Petey Williams	Pinfall

Semifinals (TV – TNA Impact!)
Samoa Joe	Submission
Alex Shelley	9:04
A.J. Styles	Pinfall
Petey Williams	9:19

Finals (PPV – Sacrifice)
Samoa Joe	Submission
A.J. Styles	15:15
