= Slammiversary (2005) =

2005 Total Nonstop Action Wrestling pay-per-view event

- Promotional poster for the event
- Promotion: Total Nonstop Action Wrestling
- Date: June 19, 2005
- City: Orlando, Florida
- Venue: TNA Impact! Zone
- Attendance: 775
- Tagline: "Three Year Anniversary Spectacular"

Pay-per-view chronology
← Previous; Hard Justice	Next → No Surrender

Slammiversary chronology
← Previous; First	Next → 2006

The 2005 Slammiversary was a professional wrestling pay-per-view (PPV) event produced by the Total Nonstop Action Wrestling (TNA) promotion, which took place on June 19, 2005 at the TNA Impact! Zone in Orlando, Florida. It was the first event under the Slammiversary chronology and the sixth event in the 2005 TNA PPV schedule. Nine professional wrestling matches, three of which featured championships, and one pre-show match were featured on the event's card. The event commemorated TNA's third anniversary, after forming on June 19, 2002.

The main event was the 2005 King of the Mountain match for the NWA World Heavyweight Championship, in which then-champion A.J. Styles defended the title against Abyss, Monty Brown, Sean Waltman, and Raven. Raven won the match and the NWA World Heavyweight Championship. The TNA X Division Championship was defended in a Three Way Elimination match by Christopher Daniels against Chris Sabin and Michael Shane. Daniels retained the championship in the encounter. On the undercard, America's Most Wanted (Chris Harris and James Storm) defeated the 3Live Kru (B.G. James and Konnan) in a tag team match. The debut of Samoa Joe was also promoted for the card. Joe defeated Sonjay Dutt in his first match for the company during the show.

The event is marked for the second-ever King of the Mountain match and the debut of Samoa Joe. Jason Clevett of the professional wrestling section of the Canadian Online Explorer rated the event a 7 out of 10, higher than the 2006 event's ranking of 6.5 out of 10 by Chris Sokol.

== Production ==
=== Background ===
In March 2005, it was announced TNA would be holding their third anniversary event on June 19, 2005. The name of the event was announced in late-March as "Slammiversary" with credit for the name going to TNA wrestler Shark Boy and the location being the TNA Impact! Zone in Orlando, Florida. A section covering the event was created on TNA's official website prior to the show. TNA held a poll heading into Slammiversary on their website asking fans to vote for their top five favorite moments in TNA's three-year existence. The results of the poll would then be shown throughout the show. TNA released a poster promoting the event featuring the tagline "Three Year Anniversary Spectacular" at some point beforehand. TNA planned a thirty-minute pre-show prior to the event. The debut of newly signed wrestler Samoa Joe was announced heading into the show where he would be pitted in a bout against Sonjay Dutt.

=== Storylines ===
Slammiversary featured nine professional wrestling matches and one pre-show matches that involved different wrestlers from pre-existing scripted feuds and storylines. Wrestlers portrayed villains, heroes, or less distinguishable characters in the scripted events that built tension and culminated into a wrestling match or series of matches.

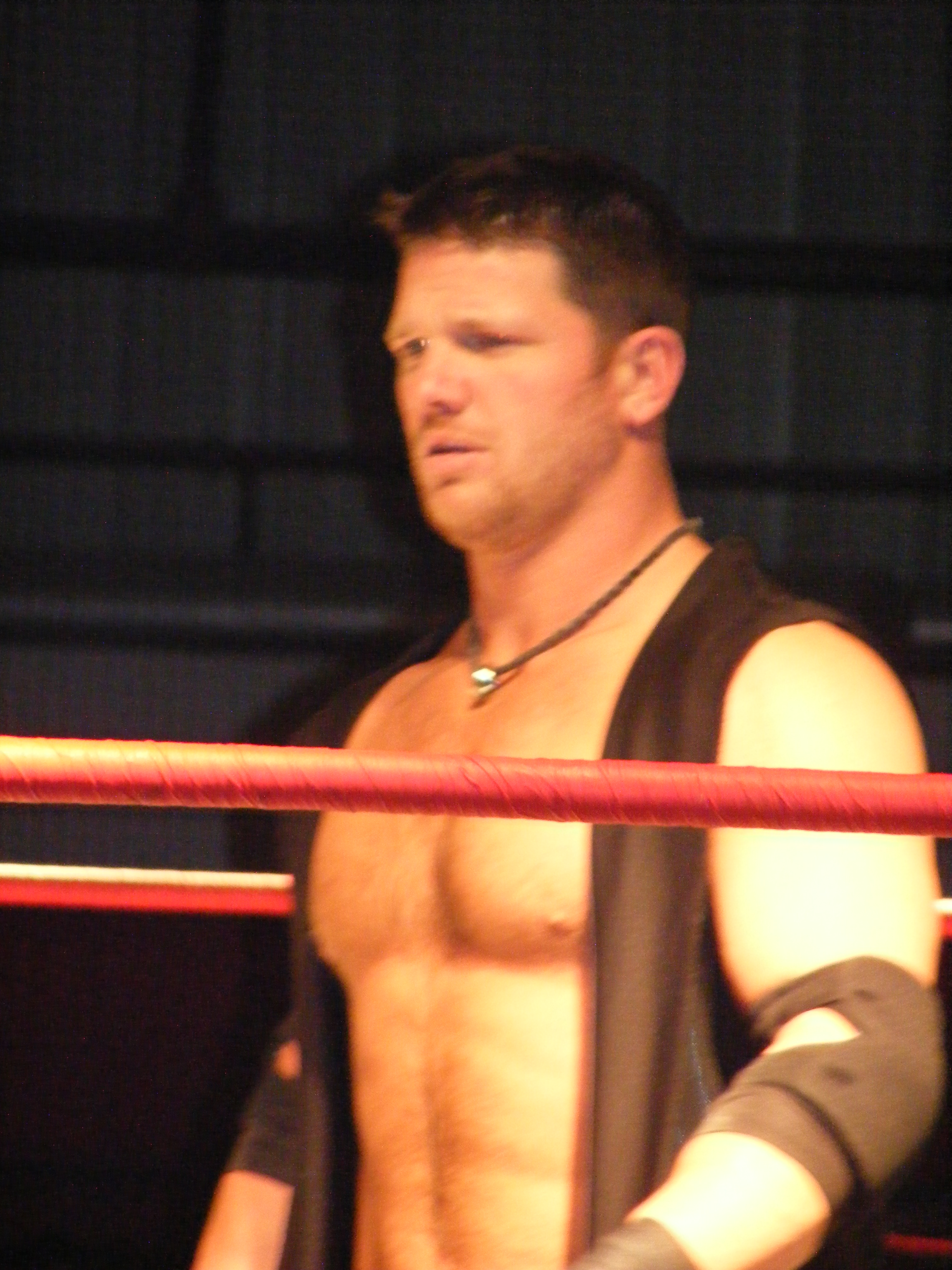
A.J. Styles (pictured) defended the NWA World Heavyweight Championship at Slammiversary in a King of the Mountain match.

The main event at Slammiversary was a King of the Mountain match for the NWA World Heavyweight Championship, in which the champion A.J. Styles defended the title against four other competitors. At TNA's Lockdown PPV event on April 24, Styles defeated Abyss in a Six Sides of Steel Cage match. With the victory, he earned a shot at the NWA World Heavyweight Championship against then-champion Jeff Jarrett at TNA's Hard Justice PPV event on May 15. At Hard Justice, Styles defeated Jarrett to win the NWA World Heavyweight Championship. On the May 20 episode of TNA's television program TNA Impact!, Jarrett demanded a rematch for the title from Director of Authority Dusty Rhodes. Rhodes agreed, but instead announced that a King of the Mountain match would be held at Slammiversary in which Styles would defend the title against Jarrett, Monty Brown, Abyss—who won a Twenty-Man Gauntlet for the Gold at Hard Justice to become number one contender—and a mystery wild card opponent. A storyline also connected to this match was the on-screen suspension and quitting of TNA wrestler Raven. On the May 20 episode of Impact!, Raven attacked Larry Zbyszko of the NWA Championship Committee after he refused to make Raven the wild card entrant in the King of the Mountain match. Rhodes suspended Raven for touching TNA personnel; Raven therefore "quit" the company in the storyline. On the May 27 episode of Impact!, Raven's reasons for the attack and for quitting TNA were revealed: he felt Rhodes was holding him back from achieving his "destiny" of winning the NWA World Heavyweight Championship.

TNA promoted a Three Way match for the TNA X Division Championship between then-champion Christopher Daniels and the challengers Chris Sabin and Michael Shane heading into Slammiversary. At Hard Justice, Sabin teamed with Traci to face the team of Shane and Trinity in a Mixed Tag Team match. The match ended with Traci and Shane turning on their partners, forming an alliance. On the May 20 episode of Impact!, Shane attacked Daniels and demanded a championship match; then Sabin attacked Shane, resulting in a brawl between the three wrestlers which was broken up by security. The following week on Impact!, Sabin made an alliance with Trinity and Daniels versus Sabin and versus Shane for the title was promoted for Slammiversary.

A storyline heading into Slammiversary revolved around the recent losing streak and declension of America's Most Wanted (Chris Harris and James Storm; AMW) in the 3Live Kru (B.G. James, Konnan, and Ron Killings). After Lockown, then-reigning NWA World Tag Team Champions AMW lost the title to The Naturals (Andy Douglas and Chase Stevens) on the April 22 episode of Impact!. AMW was granted a rematch for the titles at Hard Justice, but failed to reclaim the championship. On the May 20 episode of Impact!, TNA held a match to determine the number one contenders to the NWA World Tag Team Championship. Team Canada (Eric Young and Petey Williams) defeated AMW in the bout, meaning they would challenge The Naturals at Slammiversary for the title. AMW continued to lose heading into the May 27 episode of Impact!, where they lost to Killings and B.G. of the 3Live Kru. After the lost, AMW challenged 3Live Kru to a match at Slammiversary. At the same time, 3Live Kru were having unity problems in the narrative. In February 2005, B.G. James' former tag team partner Monty Sopp, now under the moniker "The Outlaw", debuted at TNA's Against All Odds PPV event. In the weeks after, it was unknown in the storyline whether B.G. would align with his former partner or remain with the 3Live Kru. On the May 27 episode of Impact!, B.G. saved Killings from being attacked by The Outlaw. A bout between Killings and The Outlaw was promoted for Slammiversary later as well as a bout featuring AMW versus the 3Live Kru.

== Event ==
Other on-screen personnel
Role:	Name:
Commentator	Mike Tenay
Commentator	Don West
Ring announcer	Jeremy Borash
Referee	Rudy Charles
Referee	Mark "Slick" Johnson
Referee	Andrew Thomas
Interviewers	Jeremy Borash
Interviewers	Shane Douglas

=== Pre-Show ===
Prior to the beginning of the event, TNA held a thirty-minute pre-show during which Larry Zbyszko announced that Director of Authority Dusty Rhodes had been relieved of his position in the storyline. After the show, Jeff Jarrett attacked a planted fan at ringside and was arrested in the storyline. Therefore, Jarrett was removed from the King of the Mountain match for being unable to compete. The team of Simon Diamond and Trytan defeated the team of Sonny Siaki and Apolo in a bout lasting 3 minutes and 56 seconds during the pre-show.

=== Miscellaneous ===
The event featured employees other than the wrestlers involved in the matches. Mike Tenay and Don West were the commentators for the telecast. Jeremy Borash and David Penzer were ring announcers for the event. Andrew Thomas, Rudy Charles, and Mark "Slick" Johnson participated as referees for the encounters. Shane Douglas handled the interview duties for the event. Besides employees who appeared in a wrestling role, A-1, Coach D'Amore, Jimmy Hart, Traci, and Trinity all appeared on camera, either in backstage or in ringside segments. At the start of the event it was announced that Raven would take Jarrett's place in the King of the Mountain match. Throughout the show, TNA counted down the top five favorite moments in TNA's three-year history, as voted on by the fans on TNA's online poll. The fifth moment was A.J. Styles' first NWA World Heavyweight Championship reign by defeating then-champion Jarrett and Raven in a Three Way match on June 11, 2003. The fourth was the debut of Raven in January 2003. The first ever all steel cage PPV Lockdown was third. The TNA debut of Jeff Hardy in June 2004 was second. The top favorite moment was Elix Skipper's walk across the top of the Six Sides of Steel cage during the main event between America's Most Wanted (Chris Harris and James Storm) and Triple X (Christopher Daniels and Skipper) at TNA's Turning Point PPV event on December 5, 2004.

=== Preliminary matches ===
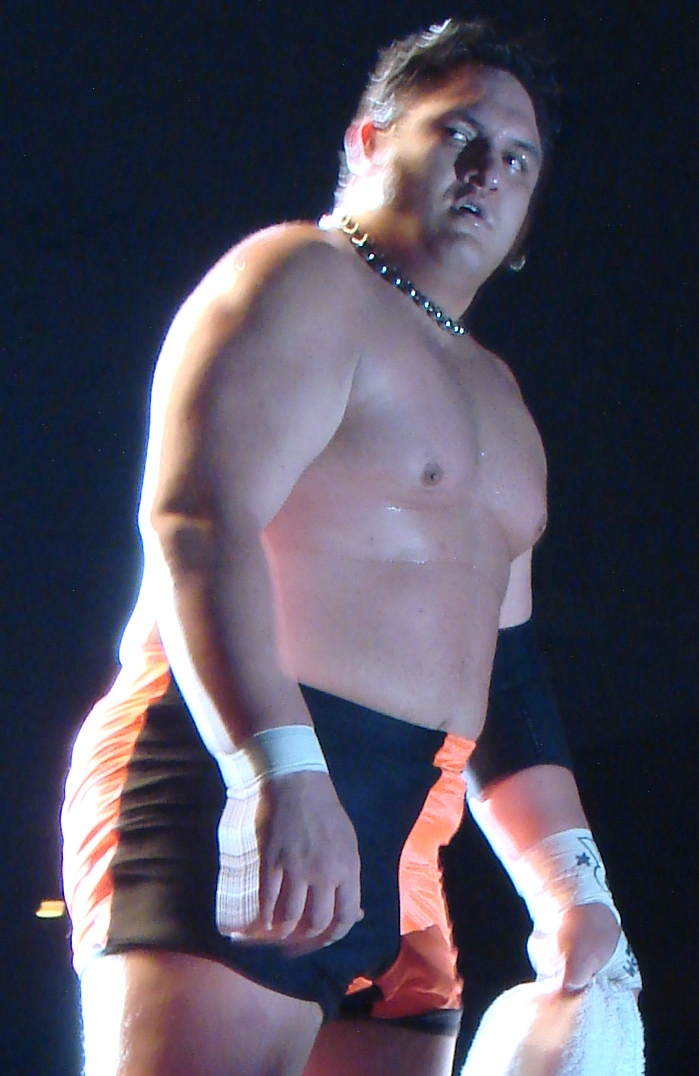
Samoa Joe (pictured) made his TNA debut at Slammiversary against Sonjay Dutt.

The first match on the card was an X Division Six Way match between Amazing Red, Delirious, Elix Skipper, Jerrelle Clark, Shark Boy, and Zach Gowen. The contest lasted 6 minutes and 25 seconds. In the final moments of the bout, multiple near-falls occurred. The first was by Gowen on Clark, ending in a two count. Then followed one by Skipper on Shark Boy, which was broken up by Amazing Red. Amazing Red then attempted a cover on Skipper, which was broken up by Clark, who then attempted to cover Amazing Red before it was stopped by Delirious. Shark Boy ended up gaining the pinfall on Delirious after using his signature maneuver the Dead Sea Drop.

Shocker fought Alex Shelley in the following bout. Its duration was 10 minutes and 13 seconds. During the contest, the two fought on the outside of the ring, where Shocker performed a dropkick on Shelley and went to follow up with a backflip splash. Shelley raised his legs, causing Shocker to crash his ribs directly on Shelley's knees. Although Shocker went on to win the encounter by using a roll-up pin.

Ron Killings versus The Outlaw was the third encounter to take place on the card. It lasted 7 minutes and 30 seconds. The Outlaw attempted to apply a Cobra Clutch submission maneuver near the end; Killings countered it by a roll-up pin for the win. After the match, The Outlaw attacked Killings until B.G. James came down to the ring to save Killings as The Outlaw was about to bash Killings with a steel chair.

The Naturals (Andy Douglas and Chase Stevens) defended the NWA World Tag Team Championship against Team Canada (Eric Young and Petey Williams), who were accompanied by A-1 and Coach D'Amore, next. During the contest, The Naturals performed their Natural Disaster tag team maneuver on Young; the pin attempt was broken up by Williams. Near the end, Williams attempted to perform his signature maneuver the Canadian Destroyer, but Jimmy Hart interfered in the contest and handed Stevens a megaphone. Stevens then bashed Williams with the megaphone and covered for the pin, retaining the NWA World Tag Team Championship at 15 minutes and 22 seconds.

The fifth match featured the TNA debut of Samoa Joe, who was pitted against Sonjay Dutt in a bout lasting 6 minutes and 22 seconds. Joe won the encounter by submission after performing his signature Muscle Buster maneuver and followed by placing Dutt in his Coquina Clutch submission hold.

Bobby Roode, who was accompanied by Coach D'Amore, fought Lance Hoyt in the following encounter. D'Amore interfered in the contest several times by distracting Hoyt, the referee, or aiding Roode in some way. Roode won the bout after performing his signature Northern Lariat maneuver at 7 minutes and 24 seconds. After the bout, Hoyt performed a backflip splash from the top of a padded turnbuckle onto a prone D'Amore in the ring.

=== Main event matches ===
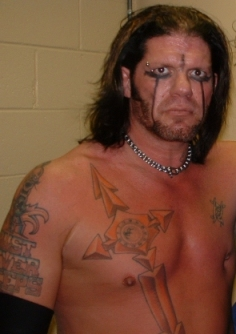
Raven (pictured) defeated four other competitors to win the NWA World Heavyweight Championship and the 2005 King of the Mountain match at Slammiversary.

The seventh match pitted America's Most Wanted (Chris Harris and James Storm) against the 3Live Kru (B.G. James and Konnan), who were accompanied by Ron Killings. The duration of the contest was 6 minutes and 54 seconds. Storm gained a near-fall after kicking James in the face. The Outlaw interfered close to the end attacking Konnan, which distracted James. This allowed Storm to lift up James, so Harris could dive off the top rope and bash him in the chest with his forearm, thus giving AMW the victory.

The TNA X Division Championship was defended next in what was originally promoted as a Three Way match but was fought under elimination rules. Christopher Daniels defended the title against Chris Sabin, who was accompanied by Trinity, and Michael Shane, who was accompanied by Traci. Near the 11 minute mark, Sabin eliminated Shane after performing his signature Cradle Shock maneuver. With the match down to Sabin and Daniels, Daniels gained a near-fall after performing his signature Best Moonsault Ever aerial maneuver. Sabin also gained a near-fall after jumping off the ropes and driving Daniels' head into the mat. Daniels eventually won the bout at 17 minutes and 10 seconds by utilizing his signature Angel's Wings maneuver.

The main event was the King of the Mountain match for the NWA World Heavyweight Championship, in which then-champion A.J. Styles defended the title against Abyss, Monty Brown, Sean Waltman—who was revealed as the wildcard entrant earlier in the show—and Jeff Jarrett's replacement Raven. In a King of the Mountain match, the objective is to climb a ladder and hang the championship belt on a hook above the ring. In order to do so, a wrestler must first qualify. To qualify a wrestler must either pin or make another wrestler submit in the match. A wrestler who is pinned or made to submit is this placed in a penalty box for two minutes. The match is fought under no disqualification rules. The match began with Waltman diving off the top of the penalty box onto Raven in the ring. Brown was the first to qualify by pinning Raven following his signature Pounce maneuver. Raven was then placed in the penalty box for two minutes. Waltman was later pinned by Brown following his signature Alpha Bomb, forcing Waltman to go to the penalty box. Raven was the next to qualify by pinning Styles on the outside of the ring following a Pounce by Brown. Styles was then forced to spend two minutes in the box. Later, Abyss pinned Brown after his signature Black Hole Slam maneuver, sending Brown to the box. Soon after, Styles qualified by pinning Abyss after forcing him through a table with his Spiral Tap maneuver. Waltman was the last to qualify by pinning Styles following his signature X-Factor maneuver off the top of a ladder. Raven was the eventual winner of the contest, after hanging the championship belt above the ring at 14 minutes and 17 seconds.

== Reception ==
A total of 775 people attended the event. Canadian Online Explorer writer Jason Clevett rated the entire event a 7 out of 10, which was higher than the 6½ out of 10 given to the 2006 Slammiversary event by Chris Sokol. Clevett did not rate TNA's previous event Hard Justice, but he gave a rating of 6 out of 10 to TNA's Lockdown. Slammiversary was marked lower than TNA's next PPV event No Surrender on July 17, which was given an 8 out of 10 by Clevett. Compared to rival World Wrestling Entertainment's Vengeance PPV event held on June 26, Slammiversary was rated higher: Sokol gave Vengeance a 6 out of 10. Clevett felt that overall Slammiversary was a "very good event". Regarding the King of the Mountain match, Clevett thought it "was fun". Although he felt the rules were "so convoluted and confusing that it ended up being a complicated spotfest". When speaking of the TNA X Division Championship match, Clevett wrote that it had a "good blend of the storyline involving Sabin, Trinity, Shane and Traci Brooks, Daniels fighting to keep his belt and some killer spots". Clevett gave his highest match rating of 8 out of 10 in his review to the X Division and World Tag Team Championship matches. He gave his lowest rating of 4 out of 10 to The Outlaw versus Ron Killings, Samoa Joe versus Sonjay Dutt, and AMW versus the 3Live Kru bouts. Clevett gave the main event a 7 out of 10.

Wade Keller of the Pro Wrestling Torch rated the main event 4¼ of 5, while he rated the X Division Championship match a 3½ out of 5. He gave the lowest ranking to the AMW versus 3Live Kru bout, at ½ of a star, while his highest went to main event. Keller described the main event as an "absolutely crazy match, but they managed to create a sense of order and consequence from the chaos and big spots". Keller thought that X Division Championship bout had "a lot of good moves and felt exciting", but when it was over "it felt like too many spots and not enough story". Keller spoke of Samoa Joe's debut as a "great squash", which showed "what sets him [Joe] apart." TNA released a DVD counting down the top 50 moments in their history in 2007, in which Raven fulfilled his destiny and won the NWA World Heavyweight Championship, listed at number 16.

== Aftermath ==
After winning the NWA World Heavyweight Championship, Raven fought Abyss in a Dog Collar match which could only be won by pinfall at No Surrender. The match was set up on the June 24 episode of Impact!, when Abyss attacked Raven after James Mitchell became his new manager. Raven challenged Abyss to a Dog Collar match on the July 1 episode of Impact!, which Abyss accepted. Raven defeated Abyss at No Surrender to retain the NWA World Heavyweight Championship. A.J. Styles went on to No Surrender to face Sean Waltman. The feud was set up at Slammiversary during the King of the Mountain match when Styles and Waltman formed an alliance. The alliance ended when Waltman turned on Styles and performed an X-Factor off the top of a ladder. Styles requested a match against Waltman on the July 8 episode of Impact!, which he was granted by Larry Zbyszko after making Jerry Lynn the Special Guest Referee. Styles then defeated Waltman at No Surrender. Also at No Surrender, Christopher Daniels fought Petey Williams over the TNA X Division Championship. On the July 1 episode of Impact!, Daniels announced he had beaten the best Mexican and American X Division wrestlers to retain the X Division Title. He was then challenged by Canadian wrestler Williams to a title defense at No Surrender, which Daniels accepted. Daniels retained the title at the event over Williams.

After Slammiversary Team Canada continued their feud with The Naturals and Lance Hoyt. On the July 1 episode of Impact!, Team Canada attacked Hoyt after his match with Eric Young. At this time, The Naturals came to Hoyt's defense, creating an alliance between them. Hoyt and The Naturals then defeated Team Canada (A-1, Bobby Roode, and Young) in a Six Man Tag Team match on the July 8 episode of Impact!. At No Surrender, Team Canada defeated Hoyt and The Naturals in a rematch.

The 3Live Kru went on to face Monty Brown and The Outlaw in a Tag Team Street Fight at No Surrender. On the June 24 episode of Impact!, Brown and The Outlaw attacked Konnan and Killings during an interview with Mike Tenay. During this time, light was shown on the absence of B.G. James in the storyline. Brown and The Outlaw defeated Konnan and Killings at the event. Afterwards, James entered the ring, where The Outlaw offered him a steel chair to bash Konnan with, which he declined and left.

Following his debut at Slammiversary, Samoa Joe defeated Chris Sabin at No Surrender. He then competed in the 2005 TNA Super X Cup Tournament, defeating A.J. Styles in the finals at TNA's Sacrifice PPV event on August 14 to win the tournament. Joe later went on to win the TNA X Division Championship on December 11 at TNA's Turning Point PPV event from Styles. Eventually, Joe won other titles in TNA. He won the TNA World Tag Team Championship in July 2007 at TNA's Victory Road PPV event and held it solo his entire reign. In April 2008, Joe won the TNA World Heavyweight Championship at TNA's Lockdown PPV event from Kurt Angle.

== Results ==
No.	Results	Stipulations	Times
1^{P}	Simon Diamond and Trytan defeated Sonny Siaki and Apolo	Tag team match	3:56
2	Shark Boy defeated Amazing Red, Delirious, Elix Skipper, Jerrelle Clark, and Zach Gowen	X Division Six-way match	6:25
3	Shocker defeated Alex Shelley	Singles match	10:13
4	Ron Killings defeated The Outlaw	Singles match	7:30
5	The Naturals (Andy Douglas and Chase Stevens) (c) defeated Team Canada (Eric Young and Petey Williams) (with A-1 and Coach D'Amore)	Tag Team match for the NWA World Tag Team Championship	15:22
6	Samoa Joe defeated Sonjay Dutt by submission	Singles match	6:22
7	Bobby Roode (with Coach D'Amore) defeated Lance Hoyt	Singles match	7:24
8	America's Most Wanted (Chris Harris and James Storm) defeated 3Live Kru (B.G. James and Konnan) (with Ron Killings)	Tag team match	6:54
9	Christopher Daniels (c) defeated Chris Sabin (with Trinity) and Michael Shane (with Traci)	Three Way Elimination match for the TNA X Division Championship	17:10
10	Raven defeated A.J. Styles (c), Abyss, Monty Brown, and Sean Waltman	King of the Mountain match for the NWA World Heavyweight Championship	14:17
(c) / – the champion(s) heading into the match; P / – the match was broadcast on the pre-show

=== TNA X Division Championship eliminations ===
No.	Wrestler Eliminated	Eliminated by	Method	Time
1	Michael Shane	Chris Sabin	Sabin pinned Shane after performing his signature Cradle Shock maneuver.	11:00
2	Chris Sabin	Christopher Daniels	Daniels pinned Sabin after performing his signature Angel's Wings maneuver.	17:10

=== King of the Mountain match statistics ===
No.	Wrestler	Wrestler pinned or made to submit	Method
1	Monty Brown	Raven	Brown pinned Raven after his signature Pounce maneuver.
2	Raven	A.J. Styles	Raven pinned Styles after a Pounce by Brown.
3	Abyss	Monty Brown	Abyss pinned Brown after his signature Black Hole Slam maneuver.
4	A.J. Styles	Abyss	Styles pinned Abyss after a Spiral Tap through a table.
5	Sean Waltman	A.J. Styles	Waltman pinned Styles after his signature X-Factor maneuver off the top of a ladder.
Winner	Raven	N/A	Raven scaled a ladder and hung the NWA World Heavyweight Championship belt to win.
