= Mikey Batts =

American former professional wrestler

- Mikey Batts (2007)

Personal information
- Born: Michael Altieri; October 3, 1983 (age 43) New Haven, Connecticut, U.S.

Professional wrestling career
- Ring name(s): Mikey Batts; Michael Altieri
- Billed height: 5 ft 8 in (1.73 m)
- Billed weight: 171 lb (78 kg)
- Billed from: New Haven, Connecticut
- Trained by: Roderick Strong; NWA Florida
- Debut: June 20, 2003
- Retired: 2006

Michael Altieri (born October 3, 1983) is an American former professional wrestler, better known by his ring name, Mikey Batts. He is best known for his time spent in Total Nonstop Action Wrestling. He has also worked as a referee.

== Professional wrestling career ==
=== Early career (2003–2004) ===
Altieri began amateur wrestling in junior high school. After graduating from high school, he enlisted in the United States Air Force in 1999. Altieri was stationed at Lackland Air Force Base in San Antonio, Texas, where he served a two-year term, during which he continued wrestling. He was discharged in 2001 and relocated to Tampa, Florida, where he became a personal trainer. While working as a trainer, he decided to become a professional wrestler.

Altieri trained under Roderick Strong at the NWA Florida school. He debuted in NWA Florida on June 20, 2003, as Mikey Batts, wrestling Naphtali. On February 26, 2005, in Brandon, Florida he won a six-way match to become the NWA Florida X Division Champion.

=== Total Nonstop Action Wrestling (2004–2005) ===
Batts debuted in Total Nonstop Action Wrestling as a planted security guard in June 2004. He was signed to a contract that same month and began teaming on a regular basis with fellow NWA Florida performer Jerrelle Clark. Batts and Clark were staples on TNA Impact! throughout 2004 but were not involved in any major angles.

In addition to competing in the tag team division, Batts wrestled in the X Division. Batts competed at TNA Hard Justice in a 20 man Gauntlet for the Gold match being quickly eliminated by The Outlaw. At TNA No Surrender on July 17, 2005, Batts took part in a four-way qualifying match for the TNA 2005 Super X Cup Tournament, which was won by Sonjay Dutt.

Batts teamed with Simon Diamond on the August 19 episode of Impact!, facing Shocker and Chris Sabin in the first round of the Chris Candido Cup. During the match, commentators Mike Tenay and Don West speculated that Batts was "auditioning" for membership in The Diamonds in the Rough, Diamond's stable of undercard wrestlers. Diamond and Batts lost the match after Sabin pinned Batts; Batts did not join the Diamonds.

=== World Wrestling Entertainment ===
==== Deep South Wrestling (2005) ====
On October 30, 2005, it was announced that Batts had signed a developmental contract with World Wrestling Entertainment and had been assigned to the Deep South Wrestling developmental territory.

==== Ohio Valley Wrestling (2005–2006) ====
In December, 2005, it was announced that Batts had been transferred to Ohio Valley Wrestling (OVW). On January 21, 2006, Batts lost his first match in OVW to Da Beast, with Tytus acting as his manager. Then, on January 27, 2006, Batts lost to Tytus, this time with Da Beast acting as manager. Batts, under his real name, wrestled and lost to WWE Cruiserweight Champion Gregory Helms on the May 6, 2006 episode of Velocity.

On June 14, 2006, Batts was released from his WWE contract.

=== Retirement ===
After his release, Batts retired from wrestling to pursue a career in mixed martial arts, which consisted of only three grappling tournaments.

== Championships and accomplishments ==
- Defiant Pro Wrestling

- DPW Cruiserweight Championship (1 time)

- NWA Florida

- NWA Florida X Division Championship (1 time)
- NWA Florida Tag Team Championship (1 time) – with Jerrelle Clark
