= Cassidy O'Reilly =

American professional wrestler

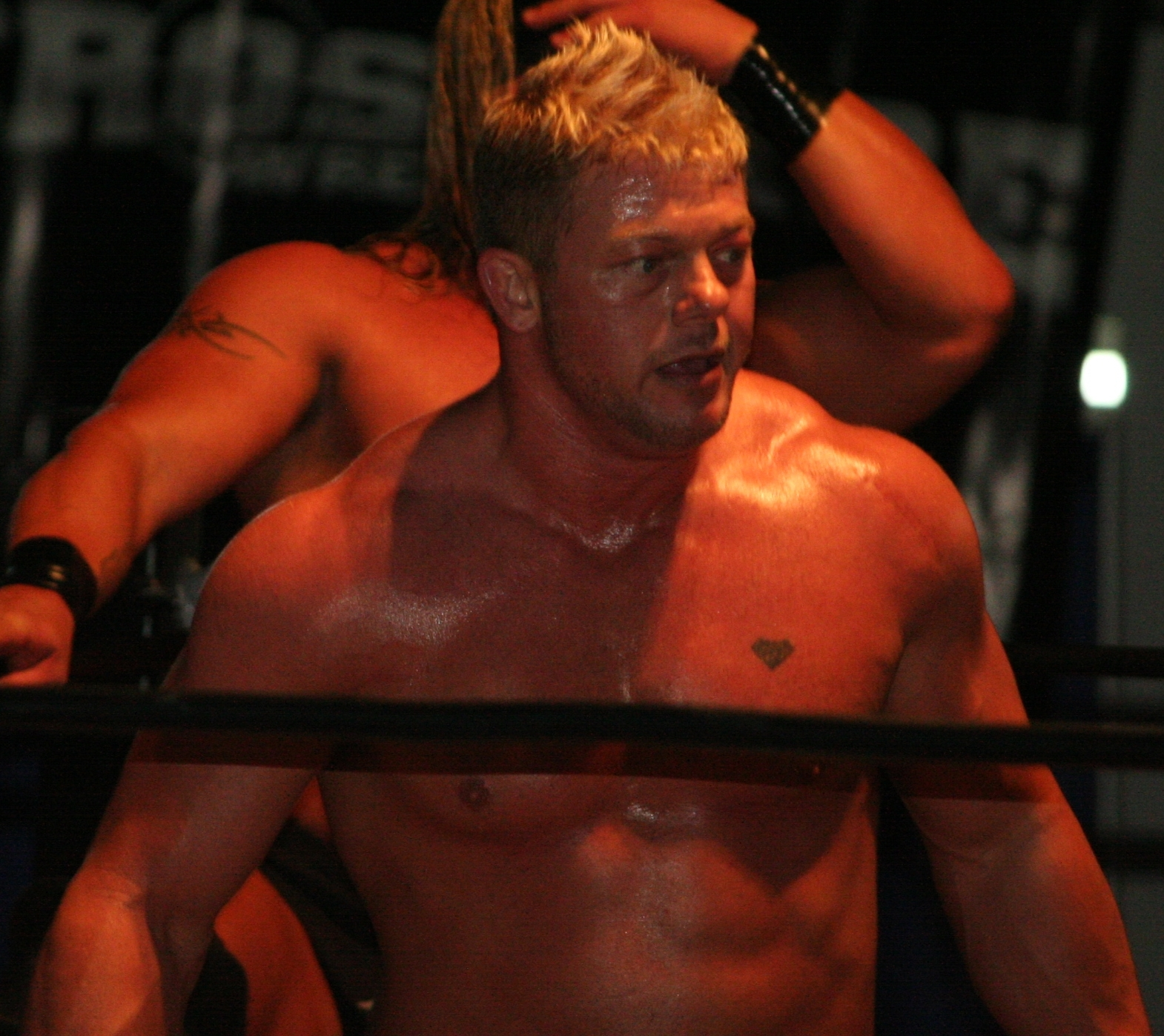
- Riley in May 2011

Personal information
- Born: Cassidy James Riley; November 21, 1976 (age 49) Monroe, Louisiana, U.S.

Professional wrestling career
- Ring name(s): Cassidy Maggio; Cassidy O'Reilly; Cass Riley; Cassidy James; Cassidy Riley; Cassidy; Kassidy James
- Billed height: 5 ft 11 in (180 cm)
- Billed weight: 205 lb (93 kg)
- Billed from: New Orleans, Louisiana
- Trained by: Lolly Dude; Terry Taylor; Tommy Rogers
- Debut: 1995

Cassidy James Riley (born November 21, 1976), also known as Kassidy James, is an American professional wrestler. He is best known for his work with Total Nonstop Action Wrestling and World Wrestling Entertainment.

== Professional wrestling career ==
=== Early years (1995–2002) ===
O'Reilly became interested in wrestling at the age of six after seeing a gory picture of Abdullah the Butcher in an issue of Pro Wrestling Illustrated, and at the age of eight he received a pair of wrestling tights from his mother and aunt as a Christmas present.

O'Reilly trained under Lolly Dude, a promoter in Dallas, for eight months, receiving supplemental training from Terry Taylor and Tommy Rogers, who were working for Dude at the time. He debuted in 1995 under his own name, facing Cedric Crain in Brighton, Tennessee. He then began wrestling on the Southern independent circuit.

O'Reilly began competing for the NWA Mississippi promotion, and won the vacant NWA Mississippi Heavyweight Championship (also designated the NWA Southern Television Championship) on June 5, 1999 in Grenada, eliminating the penultimate survivor, Big Don Brodie, to win a battle royal. He held the title for over four months before losing to Ricky Murdock on November 6 in Charleston.

During his reign as NWA Mississippi Heavyweight Champion, O'Reilly worked for the Nashville-based Music City Wrestling promotion. He formed a tag team with Air Paris, and on August 14 they defeated Ashley Hudson and Corey Williams in a match for the vacant MCW Tag Team Championships (also designated the NWA North American Tag Team Championships). They held the titles until December 25, when they lost to Mike Rapada and The Colorado Kid. The team of O'Reilly and Paris was split when Paris was signed by World Championship Wrestling.

O'Reilly began working for Bert Prentice's USA Championship Wrestling promotion, and in 2000 WCW began a talent exchange programme with Prentice which saw WCW wrestlers train in Nashville while Prentice's employees would work for WCW. O'Reilly worked for WCW for a year and a half, until the promotion was bought by the WWF in March 2001. Along with wrestlers such as James Storm and Chris Harris, O'Reilly was part of "R & B Security", a group of jobbers who were billed as the bodyguards of Vince Russo and Eric Bischoff. They would be involved in one-sided confrontations with bigger stars on Nitro and Thunder, and would wrestle one another on Worldwide and Saturday Night. O'Reilly also made an appearance on the big stage during the opening segment of the Mike Awesome and DDP match at the WCW Great American Bash 2000 PPV as a medic in the back of the ambulance.

O'Reilly made his WWE television debut on Sunday Night Heat in October 2002, losing to Raven.

=== Total Nonstop Action Wrestling (2002–2007) ===
O'Reilly formed a new tag team with Chase Stevens known as "The Hotshots". The Hotshots worked in Nashville before appearing with the fledgling NWA:TNA promotion in July 2002, when they were signed to full-time contracts. Following a feud with America's Most Wanted, the team split in October 2002 when O'Reilly left TNA due to travel problems, returning to Louisiana and taking a hiatus from wrestling.

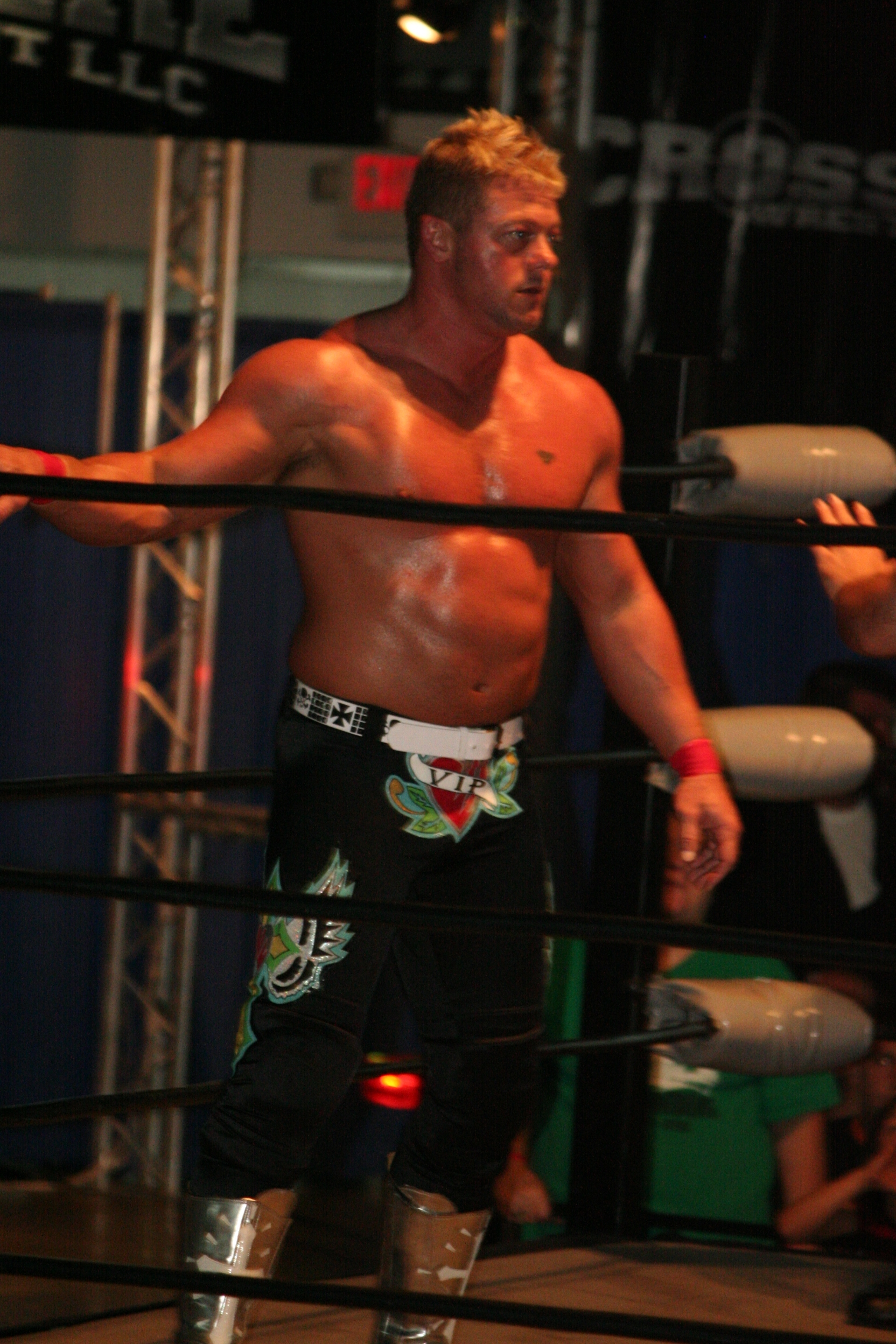
O'Reilly in the ring in May 2011

O'Reilly returned to TNA in 2004 as "Cassidy Riley", with his earlier appearances never acknowledged by the promotion. He was booked as a fan favorite underdog who regularly lost to physically more powerful villains. Riley faced Raven on the January 21, 2005 episode of TNA Impact!, and was promptly squashed, with Raven passing on several chances to pin him before finally pinning Riley and then casually breaking two of his fingers after the match. Riley was saved by Dustin Rhodes, who he subsequently developed an onscreen friendship with. Riley teamed with Rhodes on several occasions until Rhodes left the company, then resumed his singles career.

On July 8, 2005, Riley was squashed by the number one contender to the NWA World Heavyweight Championship, Abyss. After Abyss continued to attack O'Reilly after pinning him, Raven (the reigning champion) ran to ringside and attacked Abyss, but was overpowered. The following week, Riley thanked Raven and told him that he would be there if Raven needed him. On July 17 at TNA No Surrender 2005, Riley was seen in the audience dressed in Raven's signature "grunge" style. His continued emulation of Raven's dress style and mannerisms made him a target for Raven's enemies, Jeff Jarrett and Rhino, who attacked him on the July 29 episode of Impact!. Raven interrupted the proceedings, however, and spared Riley a piledriver at the hands of Rhino.

At TNA Sacrifice 2005 on August 14, Riley interfered in the main event tag team match, preventing Jeff Jarrett from hitting Raven with a guitar. At Unbreakable on September 11, he faced Jerrelle Clark in a free-for-all match which ended in an abrupt draw when Monty Brown entered the ring and attacked both men. Later that night, Riley attempted to help Raven during his NWA World Heavyweight Championship title match with Rhino, but inadvertently distracted the referee just as Raven went for a pinfall.

In the weeks prior to Bound for Glory pay-per-view, Raven appeared to accept Riley as his follower. On the Saturday prior to Bound For Glory, Riley appeared on Impact! and stated that Raven would be attending the event. The following evening, he accompanied Raven to the ring for his confrontation with Rhino, and was Gored twice by Rhino as security attempted to separate Raven and Rhino.

On the December 4 episode of Impact! Raven was booked in a three-on-one handicap "House of Fun" match against all three members of The Diamonds in the Rough - Simon Diamond, David Young, and Elix Skipper. This was part of Larry Zbyszko's personal crusade to convince Raven to sign his release from TNA. Raven was heavily beaten for several minutes before Riley came to his aid, and held off the Diamonds in the Rough for a few moments. Eventually, the numbers overwhelmed him, but he had given Raven an opening that enabled him to take control of the match momentarily. Ultimately, however, Raven was defeated. Riley continued to aid Raven until Zbyszko finally managed to oust him from the promotion at TNA Final Resolution 2006 on January 15. Riley came to the ring and remonstrated with Zbyszko until Raven signalled for him to drop the issue and left the building.

=== World Wrestling Entertainment (2007–2008) ===
O'Reilly returned to WWE television on the ECW brand where, as Cassidy Riley, he was defeated by fellow TNA alumnus Marcus Cor Von (formerly Monty Brown) on January 16, 2007. Two nights later, it was announced that he had signed a developmental contract with WWE and would be reporting to Ohio Valley Wrestling. On March 20, 2007, O'Reilly was on ECW again, he lost to Snitsky. O'Reilly then had a gimmick change to Kassidy James, the little brother of OVW/WWE wrestler K.C. James. On June 29, 2007 The James Boys defeated the Major Brothers to re-capture the OVW Southern Tag Team Championships. They then lost the belts on August 1 to the team of T.J. Dalton and Jamin Olivencia. On August 24, they regained the titles, defeating Olivencia in a handicap match. After again losing the titles to Steve Lewington and Chet the Jet on September 5, they regained the titles for the fourth time three weeks later. He was released from the WWE along with five other developmental wrestlers on February 4, 2008. After his release from WWE, O'Reilly continued working in independent promotions in Tennessee and Oklahoma and retired later that year.

=== Independent circuit (2011–present) ===
In 2011, O'Reilly returned to wrestling working in the independent circuit. He works mainly in Tennessee. Today he works for Bayou Independent Wrestling based in Louisiana.

=== Return to Total Nonstop Action Wrestling (2013) ===
In March 2013, O'Reilly returned to Total Nonstop Action Wrestling where he reunited with Chase Stevens where on March 17 competed in a 10 Men Gauntlet Battle Royal won by Matt Morgan. The next night he and Stevens lost to Aces And Eights Garett Bischoff and Wes Brisco.

== Championships and accomplishments ==
- Alternative Championship Wrestling
  - ACW Heavyweight Championship (1 time)
- Bayou Independent Wrestling
  - BIW Southern Championship (1 time)
- NWA Main Event
  - NWA North American Tag Team Championship (1 time) – with Air Paris
- Ring Warriors
  - Ring Warriors Global Tag Team Championship (1 time) – with Wes Brisco
- Ohio Valley Wrestling
  - OVW Southern Tag Team Championship (4 times) – with K.C. James
- South's Greatest Wrestling Fans
  - SGWF Television Championship (1 time)
- United Wrestling Federation
  - UWF Lightweight Championship (1 time)
- USA Championship Wrestling
  - USACW Heavyweight Championship (19 times)
- World Wrestling Council
  - WWC World Tag Team Championship (1 time) – with James Storm
