= Ryan Wilson (wrestler) =

American retired professional wrestler

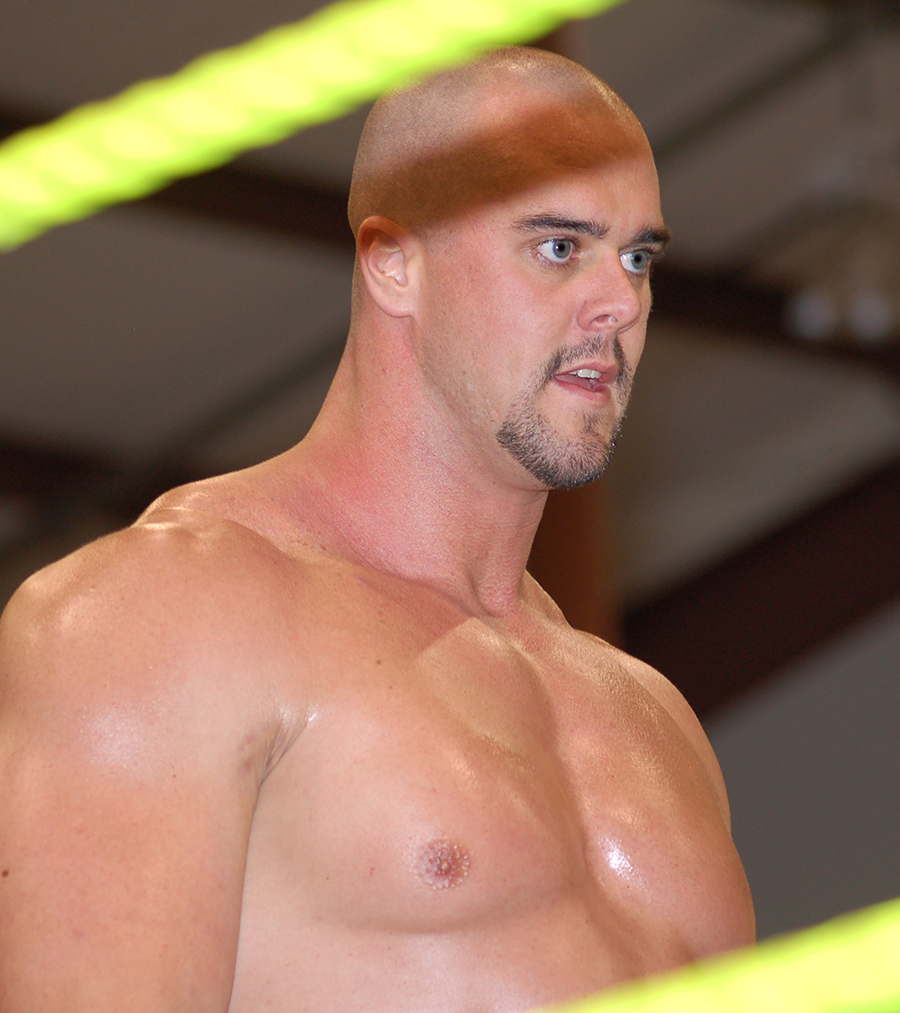
- Wilson in 2007

Personal information
- Born: Ryan Wilson

Professional wrestling career
- Ring name(s): Brique St. Pierre; Jacob Duncan; Lord Humongous; Mr. USA; Humongus; Ryan Humongous; Ryan Wilson; Titus; Trytan; Tytus
- Billed height: 6 ft 11 in (211 cm)
- Billed weight: 305 lb (138 kg)
- Debut: 2001
- Retired: 2008

Ryan Wilson is an American retired professional wrestler. He is best known for his appearances with NWA Total Nonstop Action under his real name and under the ring names Titus and Trytan, and for his appearances with World Wrestling Entertainment in its Ohio Valley Wrestling developmental promotion under the ring names Tytus and Jacob Duncan.

== Professional wrestling career ==
=== Early career (2001–2003) ===
Wilson debuted in 2001, wrestling on the independent circuit.

=== NWA Total Nonstop Action (2003–2004, 2005) ===
Wilson joined Total Nonstop Action Wrestling in September 2003 as one-half of a heel tag team, Redshirt Security, with Kevin Northcutt. Northcutt and Wilson were corrupt, physically imposing security guards (who wore red t-shirts) loyal to Don Callis and Jeff Jarrett, and regularly butt heads with the diminutive face "Blackshirt Security" (Chris Vaughn and Rick Santel). After Redshirt Security was expanded to three members with the addition of Legend in November 2003, the trio began feuding with the rebels who opposed the administration of Jarrett and Callis, namely Erik Watts, The Sandman, and Raven. This led to a six-man Clockwork Orange House of Fun match on November 19, in which Wilson suffered a broken arm. In 2004, he was fired for steroid abuse and was replaced by Legend.

Wilson returned to TNA one year later as Titus, the bodyguard of Jonny Fairplay. The gimmick was never televised, although Wilson made several dark match appearances, including a victory over Dallas on November 19. Fairplay was not employed by TNA on a regular basis, and the Titus character was eventually discarded.

In early 2005, video packages were aired hyping the debut of Wilson's latest gimmick, Trytan. The Trytan gimmick had aspects similar to The Terminator, including wearing black leather attire, sunglasses and even utilizing the character's classic mannerisms. Even his finisher, a fireman's carry facebuster was dubbed the T-3, the shortened name of Terminator 3: Rise of the Machines, and a take-off of Brock Lesnar's F-5. Wilson began stalking Monty Brown, and would disrupt his matches, extending a hand towards Brown from the entranceway. On March 13, Brown and Trytan faced off at Destination X. Brown eventually gained the upper hand over Trytan, but as he prepared to hit his signature Pounce finisher, the arena lights went out. When the lighting was restored, a masked man was in the ring in place of Wilson. Brown Pounced and pinned the masked man and was awarded the victory, although he had been unable to gain a victory over Wilson. The masked man was later identified as Mideon, but was never properly included in the storyline. Wilson's push was virtually halted following his match at Destination X. He wrestled sporadically for TNA until May 2005, when he was placed in a tag team with Simon Diamond. Diamond and Trytan appeared at Slammiversary on June 19, defeating Apolo and Sonny Siaki in a tag team match. Wilson left TNA the following month when his contract expired and was not renewed.

=== World Wrestling Entertainment (2005–2007, 2008) ===
On November 14, 2005, Wilson signed a contract with World Wrestling Entertainment. He was assigned to the WWE developmental territory Ohio Valley Wrestling. He originally went by the name "Tytus", making his debut at the January 18, 2006 OVW TV show by coming out alongside Da Beast. At the July 25 SmackDown!/ECW tapings, he defeated Funaki in a dark match.

Wilson then began wrestling in OVW under the ring name Jacob Duncan, a gimmick which saw him dress as a woodsman wearing a mask similar in design to the one Mick Foley wore as Mankind. He also spoke to his "momma" about getting his revenge on those who made fun of him growing up, indicating a sign of storyline psychosis. After a match, Jacob was confronted in the ring by The Boogeyman and began a short feud with him. On August 23, Boogeyman unmasked Duncan to reveal his identity. At OVW's 400th anniversary show, Duncan defeated The Boogeyman in a tables match to end their feud. On October 25, 2006, Duncan won the OVW Heavyweight Championship from Chet the Jett in an impromptu title match. On December 15, Duncan dropped the title to Chet. In early 2007, Duncan began feuding with Dan Rodman over the interest of Beth Phoenix, resulting in a "love triangle". After the feud ended, Phoenix continued to manage Duncan in OVW before she made her last appearance in OVW on August 15, where she lost to Katie Lea in a number one contenders match for the OVW Women's Championship and then joined the main World Wrestling Entertainment roster full-time. On November 8, 2007, Wilson was released from his WWE developmental contract. On November 1, 2008, Wilson, reusing his Jacob Duncan gimmick, returned to OVW to cause a surprise attack on Anthony Bravado. A three way match between Bravado, Wilson and Aaron Stevens ended in a no contest on November 19.

== Championships and accomplishments ==
- International Wrestling Association
  - IWA World Heavyweight Championship (1 time)
- Ohio Valley Wrestling
  - OVW Heavyweight Championship (1 time)
- New Wrestling Association
  - NWA World Championship (1 time)
