= Germán Figueroa =

Puerto Rican professional wrestler (born 1975)

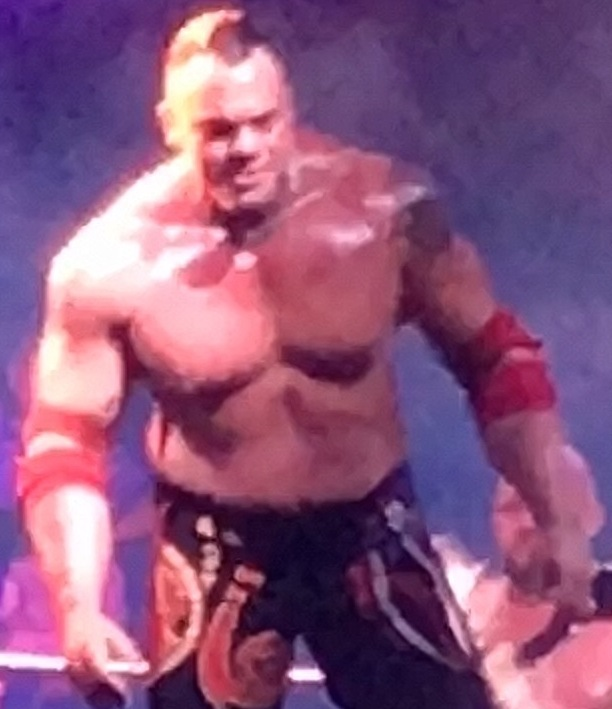

Personal information
- Born: Germán Figueroa Sullivan; May 6, 1975 (age 51) Ponce, Puerto Rico
- Spouse: La Reina Havana (m. 2002)

Professional wrestling career
- Ring name(s): Apollo; The Great Apollo; Apolo; El León; Gran Apolo; Nuevo Gran Apolo; Peter El Stripper; Power Man
- Billed height: 6 ft 4 in (1.93 m)
- Billed weight: 295 lb (134 kg; 21.1 st)
- Trained by: Dutch Mantel; Jose Estrada; Savio Vega; Miguel Pérez Jr.
- Debut: 1999

Germán Figueroa Sullivan (born May 6, 1975) is a Puerto Rican professional wrestler, actor and mixed martial artist better known as "El León" Apollo (alternatively spelled "Apolo") and El León.

Figueroa began performing in Puerto Rico's independent circuit, before entering the International Wrestling Association and World Wrestling Council. Abroad, he has made appearances in Total Nonstop Action Wrestling (TNA), the National Wrestling Alliance (NWA) and Ring Ka King, among others. Figueroa has also been signed to WWE and held an administrative role in World Warriors Wrestling (WWW).

== Professional wrestling career ==
Figueroa was originally a professional basketball player, and represented Puerto Rico in a game against the United States basketball team in Madison Square Garden in 1991. Figueroa first became involved with professional wrestling by performing in the local independent circuit, performing as "Peter el Stripper". He subsequently migrated to Mexico, adopting the masked persona of "Power Man", wrestling along veteran luchador Silver Star.

=== International Wrestling Association (1999–2006, 2007) ===
After deciding to become a professional wrestler, Figueroa trained under Hector Soto, Savio Vega, Miguel Pérez, Jr. and others and debuted in the Puerto Rican International Wrestling Association in 1999 as Nuevo Gran Apolo ("New Great Apolo", after a previous Gran Apolo who had held the WWC North American Tag Team Championship with King Tonga in the 1980s), facing Andy Anderson. He quickly ascended the ranks of the promotion, at first forming a tag team with Ricky Banderas known as the Nueva Generación ("New Generation"). They first won the IWA Tag Team Championships on May 7, 2000, in Moca, defeating the Starr Corporation. They held the titles twice more that year, but on August 6, a day after their third reign began, Banderas turned on Figueroa and named Miguelito Pérez as his new partner. In 2001 Figueroa and Pérez formed a tag team, and on February 24 they won the IWA Tag Team Championships, making Figueroa a four-time tag team champion. On March 23, however, Pérez no-showed a scheduled title defence, and Figueroa fell to the Starr Corporation in a de facto handicap match.

Having been betrayed by two tag team partners, Figueroa decided to focus on the richest prize in the IWA; the IWA Heavyweight Championship. His goal was swiftly realized; on June 16, 2001, in Bayamón Figueroa defeating reigning champion Ricky Banderas and Tiger Ali Singh in a Three Way match to become IWA World Champion. He lost the title to Pain on September 29, who in turn lost to Glamour Boy Shane. Figueroa began feuding with Shane over the title, winning the title for a second time on October 27. Shane was, however, unwilling to relinquish the title, and two months later the title was held-up after a TLC Match ended in controversial fashion. Figueroa immediately went after the vacant title, but lost a crowning match to Primo Carnero when IWA President Victor Quiñones threw in a towel on his behalf. Figueroa soon returned to the title pictures, however, and won the IWA Heavyweight Championship three more times in 2002, and one in 2003 and 2004 respectively. In April 2003 he was sidelined for eight months with a serious neck injury.

Figueroa shortened his name to Gran Apolo, then simply Apolo. He later added the prefix "El León".

Figueroa left the IWA in 2006, returning on September 23, 2007, at the Golpe de Estado event.

=== Total Nonstop Action Wrestling (2002, 2004, 2005–2006) ===
Figueroa joined Total Nonstop Action Wrestling in July 2002 as Apolo. He made several appearances for the promotion, with his last match being a loss to Jeff Jarrett on August 7 in a match with Ricky Steamboat as the special guest referee.

On January 14, 2004, Figueroa returned to TNA under a mask as El León ("The Lion"), attacking Jarrett. The following week he faced Jarrett in a street fight that ended in a no-contest. Figueroa unmasked on March 31, and formed a tag team with D'Lo Brown. That same night, Figueroa and Brown defeated three other teams to become number one contenders to the vacant tag team championships. On April 14, 2004, Figueroa and Brown defeated Kid Kash and Dallas for the NWA World Tag Team Championships, winning by disqualification (in TNA, title can change hands on countouts or disqualifications) when Dallas brought a pipe into the ring. The following week, Kash and Dallas claimed their rematch. In the course of the match, Kash attempted to hit Figueroa with a pipe, but Figueroa was able to wrestle it from him and use it on Kash and Dallas. Referee Rudy Charles saw Figueroa with the weapon and disqualified him as a result, thereby returning the titles to Kash and Dallas. The two teams faced one another for a third time on April 28 in a Nightstick on a Pole Match to determine the undisputed NWA World Tag Team Champions, and Figueroa and Brown were defeated. Figueroa then left the promotion once more.

Figueroa returned to TNA for a third run on March 4, 2005, with Director of Authority Dusty Rhodes welcoming him as part of his "open door policy". After defeating Sonny Siaki on the March 25 episode of TNA Impact!, Figueroa earned the respect of his Samoan opponent, and the duo formed a tag-team. On June 19 at Slammiversary they were defeated by Simon Diamond and Trytan. The team was split when Siaki's contract expired in December 2005.

On the December 31 episode of Impact!, Figueroa helped Konnan and the debuting Homicide to ambush Bob Armstrong. The trio were later identified as "The Latin American Xchange".

After Figueroa no-showed TNA Final Resolution 2006, he was removed from TNA television. At Against All Odds on February 12, 2006, he was replaced with Machete. He was released from the promotion that same month.

Figueroa was a participant in a TNA event that took place on June 3, 2007, in San Juan, Puerto Rico. He was booked to wrestle in a tag team match with Jeff Jarrett against Scott Steiner and James Storm, Figueroa's team won the match.

=== Puerto Rican independent circuit (2006–2007) ===
After entering into a backstage conflict with the IWA's management, Figueroa no-showed a scheduled appearance on June 24, 2006, going on to debut in the New Wrestling Stars (NWS), then a large independent promotion with a talent exchange and cooperation arrangement with WWC, the following night. His first appearance in the NWS was a spot where his characteristic music was played and he made the save by interfering in an assault on the face faction. He was recruited by Rico Casanova. However, since Figueroa was still under contract with the IWA until March 2007 and had taken the case to the courts of Puerto Rico seeking a release, WWC decided not to air this segment in their television program, Superestrellas de la Lucha Libre. The NWS had been experiencing talent losses and economic difficulty prior to this angle, relying heavily on it to recover and its ownership was infuriated over the segment being skipped, which led to the end of the NWS-WWC agreement. Still unable to wrestle under his character while it was under legal litigation, Figueroa adopted a masked persona known as "El Rey Romano", though his actual identity was not denied or ignored. This was a strategy that the promotion had previously used with Shane Sewell, known as the masked "Mr.GPR", and initially used by the IWA when Ray González entered it as "Rey Fénix" while challenging his contract with WWC. Figueroa entered an angle against manager Ángel "El Profe" Pantojas, who brought in Rein Stein, whom he defeated by disqualification.

While working in NWS, Figueroa made appearances in another independent promotion the Puerto Rico Wrestling Association (PRWA), debuting on July 19, 2006, in a non-wrestling role as "El Romano". On September 3, 2006, he won a disqualification over Brutus "El Carnicero" when the heel stable interfered. At PRWA's Purgatorio event, he defeated a wrestler known as "Tonka". On September 13, 2006, Figueroa defeated "Voodo Man" by pinfall. The entrance of Figueroa to NWS had considerable impact due to the fact that he had remained exclusive to the IWA throughout his career, a distinction only shared by the other half of the Dream Team tag team, Ricky Banderas. However, the lack of a licensed promoter following the end of the company's relationship with WWC propelled it into immediate economic problems due to the cost of the roster's established figures. The NWS aired the last edition of its television program, A Puro Fuego, on September 10, 2006, and in less than three months its personnel had been salvaged by IWA and WWC. After this, Figueroa continued performing in PRWA, wrestling Edgar "Spectro" Díaz at Levantando la Dignidad. Figueroa next focused on a new independent company founded in his native Ponce, the World Wrestling Revolutions, where he debuted on September 8, 2006, using the ringname "El León Apolo" (fusing his nickname and former ringname) in a tag team match. In his second appearance for the promotion, he won a tag team match. Figueroa was later involved in a visit that the WWR's CEO, Denys Negrón, made to meet with TNA personnel. By November, the promotion decided to change his ring name to "Rey de Reyes". Figueroa also made two appearances for independent promotion WOA, losing a singles match and being disqualified in a tag team match.

=== World Wrestling Council (2007) ===
After his contract with IWA expired Figueroa joined Carlos Colón's wrestling promotion the World Wrestling Council under his former IWA gimmick. He was first involved in an angle involving Bronco, in which he was accused of not fulfilling his obligations two years before when he has rumored to debut on WWC. Following this feud he was involved in several confrontations with Eddie Colón; this led to the two of them meeting in two number one contendership matches both of which were won by Apolo. On May 12, 2007, in WWC's annual event Summer Madness, Apolo faced Alofa "The Samoan tank" in a match where Colón served as guest referee, Apolo applied his finishing move to Alofa gaining a pinfall victory in the process becoming the WWC Universal Heavyweight Champion. Figueroa would lose the title on May 19, 2007, in a twelve-man Royal Rumble where Eddie Colón would be booked to become the new champion.

=== World Wrestling Entertainment (2007) ===
On December 21, 2007, the company announced that Figueroa had signed a contract with World Wrestling Entertainment, in this announcement they informed that Figueroa would wrestle in Florida Championship Wrestling, one of the company's development territories before being promoted to one of the main rosters. On March 4, 2008, it was reported that Figueroa had been released from his contract.

=== Various promotions (2007–present) ===
Figueroa returned to the International Wrestling Association after working several months in the World Wrestling Council and wrestled there during the final months of 2007.

After being released from his contract Figueroa remained inactive for several months. On June 7, 2008, he returned to action in the Puerto Rico Wrestling Association, winning a three-way match. On November 16, 2008, Figueroa performed in a card presented by the IWA.

Subsequently, Figueroa began competing for NWA On Fire, one of the independent promotions that form part of the National Wrestling Alliance (NWA). On December 27, 2008, Figueroa was booked to win the NWA On Fire Heavyweight Championship by defeating Danny Inferno. On May 2, 2009, Figueroa defeated Mike DiBiase II to win the NWA North American Heavyweight Championship, becoming a dual-champion within the NWA.

After being released, Figueroa returned to wrestling at WWC's Aniversario 2012 event, where he defeated "The Precious One" Gilbert Cruz to win his second Universal Heavyweight Championship. While working for WWC, Figueroa was recruited by the World Wrestling League as a member of the interpromotional Team Puerto Rico, joining Banderas and Joe "Hercules" Gómez with Rico Casanova as the GM of the promotion. On June 25, 2013, Figueroa defeated a masked luchador known as Apocalipsis to win the Maximum Heavyweight championship of the Peru-based Leader Wrestling Association. This was the main event of Campeones del Ring: Hacedores de Proezas 2013 and it marked the first instance that a foreign wrestler won the belt. He dropped the belt to Apocalipsis in the final event of this tour. On July 27, 2013, Figueroa teamed with Joe "Hercules" Gómez to defeat J. T. Dunn and Mike Graca for the NWW World Tag Team Championship. The team challenged for the WWL World Tag Team Championship on September 8, 2013, but failed to win due to outside intervention. On November 16, 2013, at Crossfire, he won the WWC Puerto Rico Heavyweight Championship.

On December 30, 2013, Figueroa filmed a promotional skit for a debuting independent promotion named Latin Wrestling Alliance appearing along his son, Alex Figueroa, in the later's debut appearance in professional wrestling. The company's first show took place on February 1, 2014, where he defeated his opponent after his son intervened on his behalf. On March 7, 2014, Figueroa returned to WWL winning a three-way match over Cien Caras Jr. and X-Fly. Two days later he wrestled Cien Caras, Jr. in a one-on-one rematch, winning by using the ropes for leverage. On September 16, 2014, Figueroa makes an appearance in Canada Legends City Wrestling (LCW) promotion as a heel mysterious wrestler who would face in a single match against Rhyno, due to interventions of Kilgrave and Kowboy Mike Hughes the match was changed to a tag team match between Figueroa & Kilgrave Vs Rhyno & Kowboy Mike Hughes losing the match Kilgrave after receive The Gore of Rhyno. On October 18, 2014, in WWL, Apolo teamed with ATLAS to face Mr. Big and his returning surprise partner Noel Rodriguez, in a controversial victory when Mr. Big chockeslamed his partner. After the match, Mr. Big and several authority enforcers attacked Rodriguez, and after several minutes, Apolo returned to help Noel.

On June 13, 2015, Figueroa defeat a masked wrestler known as Mr. Fantastic for win the LCW Heavyweight Championship, later on June 24, 2015, Figueroa & his wife Havana, returns to WWC in the event Summer Madness.

== Mixed martial arts career ==
On December 19, 2019, Combate Americas announced that Figueroa (competing under his real name) would be making his debut in a fight against John Calloway. In the press release it was reported that he had been training for a year. The fight was scheduled for January 25, 2020, as part of a card to be headlined by Amanda Serrano at the José Miguel Agrelot Coliseum.

== Personal life ==
Figueroa is married to former professional wrestler Verónica Polera, also known under her ring name La Reina Habana. The couple married on an event of the International Wrestling Association which was aired in the promotion's weekly television program. Figueroa has five children, a twenty-year-old and sixteen-year-old son and twelve- year -old daughter with his current wife Havana and two other from a previous marriage.

In his youth, Figueroa had a brief career as a professional basketball player, making appearances for the Maratonistas de Coamo of the Baloncesto Superior Nacional (BSN).

Figueroa was arrested on May 23, 2007, for missing a child-support payment, he was released on May 30, 2007, after part of the alimony money was lent by his best friend Jorge Maldonado (Rico Casanova).

On June 22, 2007, Figueroa was jailed after he supposedly twisted Polera's arm and squeezed her neck. According to the official report the couple were traveling through the road numbered 861 in the San Fernando sector of Bayamón, Puerto Rico when the incident happened. Following the aggression Polera sought refuge in the police headquarters located in West Bayamón. Polera was attended by medical personnel in the Center of Diagnosis and Treatment of Bayamón. According to Héctor Rivera Sánchez who served as prosecutor in the case Polera had bruises in her neck. Figueroa was subsequently arrested after judge Milagros Muñiz determined there was cause for his arrest. Figueroa did not present any resistance at the moment of his arrest, Muniz established the bail amount at eight thousand dollars which he paid being released later that evening. Following this event, a preliminary court hearing was scheduled for July 11, 2007, to determine a sentence regarding this case. The case was attended on October 10, 2007, in the hearing Figueroa pleaded guilty on domestic violence charges and the sentence involved him participating in a detour program for a period of a year.

On November 16, 2014, German introduced his son Alex Figueroa into the business at LWA (a promotion in Connecticut that later fell due to complications). Under the ring name of his father Apolo jr and continuing his training at PWA CT< Apolo Jr traveled with his father to wrestle in various promotions together such as WWC and WWL in Puerto Rico, WXW in Florida and many more shows around the states. residing in Florida Apolo Jr now is under the training of Afa The Wild Samoan at The Wild Samoan Pro Wrestling Training Center and Pro Wrestling 2.0 with Alex Pourteau. Apolo Jr continues to wrestle successfully in various promotions all over the states under his new Dark/Chaotic persona "The Maker Of Chaos" Apolo Jr/Alex Misery.

== Championships and accomplishments ==
- International Wrestling Association
  - IWA World Heavyweight Championship (8 times)
  - IWA World Tag Team Championship (4 times) – with Ricky Banderas (3) and Miguel Pérez (1)
  - IWA Hardcore Championship (2 times)
- Ground Zero Wrestling
- GZW Heavyweight Championship (1 time, current)
- International Wrestling Association Florida
  - IWA Florida World Heavyweight Championship (1 time)
- Leader Wrestling Association
  - LWA Maximum Championship (1 time)
- Legend City Wrestling
  - LCW Heavyweight Championship (1 time)
- New World Wrestling
  - NWW World Tag Team Championship (1 time) – with Joe Gómez
- NWA On Fire
  - NWA / On Fire Heavyweight Championship (2 times)
  - NWA Pro East Television Championship (1 time)
- NWA Southwest
  - NWA North American Heavyweight Championship (1 time)
- Planet Championship Wrestling
  - PCW Heavyweight Championship (1 time)
- Lionheart Wrestling Association
- LWA World Championship (1 time)
- Power of Wrestling
  - POW Heavyweight Championship (1 time)
- Pro Wrestling Illustrated
  - PWI ranked him #143 of the top 500 singles wrestlers in the PWI 500 in 2003
- Qatar Pro Wrestling
  - QPW Tag Team Championship (1 time) – with Al Snow
- Total Nonstop Action Wrestling
  - NWA World Tag Team Championship (1 time) – with D-Lo Brown
- World Wrestling Council
  - WWC Universal Heavyweight Championship (4 times)
  - WWC Puerto Rico Heavyweight Championship (1 time)

== See also ==
- Professional wrestling in Puerto Rico
