= Team Mexico =

Professional wrestling stable

Stable
- Members: See below

Team Mexico is a professional wrestling stable that was first formed in 2004 to compete in TNA Wrestling's America's X-Cup Tournament and has since returned to compete in other TNA X Cup Tournaments.

== History ==
=== 2004 ===
The original team consisted of AAA wrestlers Juventud Guerrera, Hector Garza, Abismo Negro, and Mr. Águila. They were managed by AAA owner Antonio Peña. They defeated Team USA in the first America's X Cup to win the trophy. They went on to defeat Team Canada in the second round of the America's X Cup, as well as Team Britain in the third round. During the series of America's X Cups, Juventud was dropped from the team after parting ways with AAA. It was at this point that Hector Garza was promoted to team captain and Heavy Metal was added to the team to maintain roster number.

In the World X Cup, Garza won the Gauntlet for the Gold. Team Mexico advanced to the final Ultimate X match but lost when Chris Sabin retrieved the X to bring the gold home to Team USA.

=== 2006 ===
Team Mexico was reformed in 2006 in light of TNA hosting a second World X Cup Tournament. Team Mexico 2006 was composed of Shocker (Team Captain), Puma, Incognito, and Magno. Their theme song was "Mexican Unstoppable". Shocker, Magno, and Puma appeared on Lockdown prior to the World X Cup beginning, with Puma competing in the Xscape Match while the three-person contingent looked on during the Team USA vs. Team Japan exhibition contest. Team Mexico scored some early success in the X Cup, with Shocker and Magno defeating Eric Young and Johnny Devine of Team Canada on an episode of Impact!. Puma lost a second round match against Chris Sabin, placing Team Mexico in second place heading into Sacrifice and the finals. Puma managed to make it to the end of the Gauntlet for the Gold finals, but was pinned by Petey Williams and lost the match. Team Mexico was officially listed in third place for the tournament.

=== 2008 ===
Team Mexico returned to TNA for the 2008 World X-Cup, which they won.

== Members ==
=== 2004 ===
- (Mexico) Juventud Guerrera (Original captain that was removed from team after incident involving Jerry Lynn)
- (Mexico) Héctor Garza (Captain after Juventud was released)
- (Mexico) Abismo Negro
- (Mexico) Mr. Águila
- (Mexico) Heavy Metal (Added when Juventud was dropped from the team)

=== 2006 ===
- (Mexico) Shocker (Captain)
- (United States) Puma
- (United States) Magno
- (United States) Incognito

=== 2008 ===
- (Mexico) Último Guerrero (Captain)
- (Mexico) Rey Bucanero
- (Mexico) Averno
- (Mexico) Volador Jr.

== Competitive Record ==
=== World X Cup Record ===
Competition	Notes	Position	Points	Captain
2004 America's X Cup		1st	N/A	Juventud Guerrera
2004 World X Cup		3rd	3	Héctor Garza
2006 World X Cup		3rd	4	Shocker
2008 World X Cup		1st	7	Último Guerrero

== Championships and accomplishments ==
TNA

- TNA America's X Cup (2004) - Juventud Guerrera, Héctor Garza, Abismo Negro and Mr. Águila (2004 America's X-Cup Team)
- TNA World X-Cup (2008) - Último Guerrero, Rey Bucanero, Averno and Volador Jr. (2008 World X-Cup Team)
