= TNA X Cup Tournaments =

X Cup
- Promotion: Total Nonstop Action Wrestling
- Other names: Super X Cup; America's X Cup; World X Cup
- First event: 2003 Super X Cup

Tournament information
- Established: 2003; 23 years ago
- Current winner: (Belgium) Ricky Sosa
- Last completed: 2026 World X-Cup
- Editions: 9
- Format: Five-way elimination match
- Participants: 5
Statistics
- First winner: Chris Sabin
- Most wins: (United States) Chris Sabin (3 wins)
- Oldest winner: (United States) Jerry Lynn (40 years, 349 days)
- Youngest winner: (United States) Jay Lethal (21 years, 15 days)
- Heaviest winner: Samoa Joe (282 lb (128 kg))
- Lightest winner: (Mexico) Juventud Guerrera (165 lb (75 kg))

The TNA X Cup Tournament consists of various types of X Division tournaments that feature wrestlers and/or teams from all over the world competing in Total Nonstop Action Wrestling (TNA) to fight for various trophies or championship matches. After a near decade long hiatus, the tournament returned in 2017 before going on another four-year hiatus. As of 2021, there has been eight X cup tournaments (four super X cups and four team X cups).

The first X Cup Tournament of any kind was the 2003 Super X Cup. It featured wrestlers from around the Globe competing in one-on-one matches. Chris Sabin was the winner of the 2003 Super X Cup. Since then, the generally positive response from TNA's viewers to the 2003 Super X Cup has led to other X Cup Tournaments. Multiple competitors in each tournament have represented various different companies, such as Pro Wrestling Noah, Lucha Libre AAA Worldwide, All Japan Pro Wrestling, AAW Wrestling, Border City Wrestling and Wrestle Circus. Throughout the history of the tournament, Impact has used a plethora of outside talent to compete in the tournament. In the early beginnings of the Super X Cup, it was stated that the tournament winner would automatically became the number-one contender for the TNA X Division Championship.

Inaugural winner Chris Sabin holds the record most X cup wins with 3 (1 individually and 2 with Team USA). Team Mexico and Team USA are tied for most X cup wins as a team with 2 each. In individual X cups, no winners has won more than once as of January 2021.

== List of winners ==
#	Edition	Tournament final					Ref.
#	Edition	Winner	Wins	Event	Date	Location	Ref.
1	2003 Super X Cup	Chris Sabin	1	Super X Cup	August 20, 2003 (Aired September 3)	Nashville, TN	
2	2004 America's X Cup	Team Mexico (Mr. Águila, Hector Garza, Abismo Negro, and Juventud Guerrera)	1	America's X Cup	February 11, 2004	Nashville, TN	
3	2004 World X Cup	(United States) Team USA (Christopher Daniels, Jerry Lynn, Chris Sabin, and Elix Skipper)	1 (1, 1, 2, 1)	World X Cup	May 26, 2004	Nashville, TN	
4	2005 Super X Cup	Samoa Joe	1	Sacrifice	August 14, 2005	Orlando, FL	
5	2006 World X Cup	(United States) Team USA (Chris Sabin, Sonjay Dutt, Alex Shelley, and Jay Lethal)	2 (3, 1, 1, 1)	Sacrifice	May 14, 2006	Orlando, FL	
6	2008 World X Cup	Team Mexico (Averno, Rey Bucanero, Ultimo Guerrero, and Volador Jr.)	2 (1, 1, 1, 1)	Victory Road	July 13, 2008	Houston, TX	
7	2017 Super X Cup	Dezmond Xavier	1	Destination X	August 17, 2017	Orlando, FL	
8	2021 Super X Cup	Ace Austin	1	Genesis	January 9, 2021	Nashville, TN	
9	2026 World X-Cup	(Belgium) Ricky Sosa	1	Destination X	November 15, 2026	Edmonton, Alberta, Canada	

== Tournament history ==
=== 2003 Super X Cup ===
The 2003 Super X Cup was the inaugural X Cup. It took place on the Super X Cup special on August 20, 2003, in Nashville, Tennessee; it aired on September 3. This edition was a standard single-elimination tournament with eight competitors: Chris Sabin, Frankie Kazarian, Jerry Lynn Jonny Storm, Juventud Guerrera, Michael Shane, Nosawa, and Teddy Hart. The winner of the tournament was Chris Sabin, who defeated Guerrera in the final.

=== 2004 America's X Cup ===
The 2004 America's X Cup was the only edition of the America's X Cup and the second overall edition of the X Cup. It took place on May 26, 2004. The tournament featured TNA wrestlers as well as wrestlers from other promotions, including the National Wrestling Alliance and Lucha Libre AAA Worldwide. The tournament consisted of three rounds. The first round consisted of four singles matches, the second round consisted of two tag team matches, and the third round was an eight-man tag team elimination match between Team USA (Jerry Lynn, Chris Sabin, Elix Skipper, and Sonjay Dutt) and Team Mexico (Héctor Garza, Abismo Negro, Juventud Guerrera, and Mr. Águila). The winner of the tournament was Team Mexico.

=== 2004 World X Cup ===
The 2004 World X Cup was the inaugural edition of the World X Cup and the third overall edition of the X Cup. It took place on May 26, 2004. The tournament featured TNA wrestlers as well as wrestlers from other promotions, including the National Wrestling Alliance and Lucha Libre AAA Worldwide. The tournament consisted of four rounds, as well as a tiebreaker round. The first round consisted of a 16-man gauntlet match, the second round consisted of two tag team matches, the third round was a four-way ladder match, and the fourth round was a three-way Ultimate X match. The tournament winner was Team USA, which consisted of team captain Jerry Lynn, Chris Sabin, Christopher Daniels, and Elix Skipper.

Team standings
Rank	Team	Wrestlers	Points
1	(United States) Team USA	Jerry Lynn (captain)	7
1	(United States) Team USA	Chris Sabin	7
1	(United States) Team USA	Christopher Daniels	7
1	(United States) Team USA	Elix Skipper	7
2	Team Canada	Petey Williams (captain)	4
2	Team Canada	Bobby Roode	4
2	Team Canada	Eric Young	4
2	Team Canada	Johnny Devine	4
3	Team Mexico	Héctor Garza (captain)	3
3	Team Mexico	Abismo Negro	3
3	Team Mexico	Heavy Metal	3
3	Team Mexico	Mr. Águila	3
4	Team Japan	Nosawa (captain)	2
4	Team Japan	Mitsu Hirai Jr.	2
4	Team Japan	Ryuji Hijikata	2
4	Team Japan	Taichi Ishikari	2

=== 2005 Super X Cup ===
The 2005 Super X Cup was the second edition of the Super X Cup and the fourth overall edition of the X Cup. The first round and the semifinals were taped on July 19, 2005, for the July 22 to August 12 episodes of Impact!. The final took place at Sacrifice on August 14. This edition was a standard single-elimination tournament with eight competitors: A.J. Styles, Alex Shelley, Chris Sabin, Matt Bentley, Petey Williams, Samoa Joe, Shocker, and Sonjay Dutt. The winner of the tournament was Samoa Joe, who defeated Styles in the final.

=== 2006 World X Cup ===
The 2006 World X Cup was the second edition of the World X Cup and the fifth overall edition of the X Cup. It took place from April 27 to May 18, 2006, on episodes of Impact! and the Sacrifice pay-per-view event. The tournament featured TNA wrestlers as well as wrestlers from other promotions, including New Japan Pro-Wrestling. The tournament consisted of three rounds, as well as a tiebreaker round. The first round consisted of two tag team matches, the second round consisted of two singles matches that pitted the captains of each team against each other, and the third round was a 16-man gauntlet match. The tournament winner was Team USA, which consisted of team captain Chris Sabin, Alex Shelley, Jay Lethal, and Sonjay Dutt.

Team standings
Rank	Team	Wrestlers	Points
1	(United States) Team USA	Chris Sabin (captain)	6
1	(United States) Team USA	Alex Shelley	6
1	(United States) Team USA	Jay Lethal	6
1	(United States) Team USA	Sonjay Dutt	6
2	Team Canada	Petey Williams (captain)	5
2	Team Canada	Eric Young	5
2	Team Canada	Johnny Devine	5
2	Team Canada	Tyson Dux	5
3	Team Mexico	Shocker (captain)	4
3	Team Mexico	Incognito	4
3	Team Mexico	Magno	4
3	Team Mexico	Puma	4
4	Team Japan	Jushin Thunder Liger (captain)	3
4	Team Japan	Black Tiger	3
4	Team Japan	Hirooki Goto	3
4	Team Japan	Minoru Tanaka	3

=== 2008 World X Cup ===
The 2008 World X Cup was the third edition of the World X Cup and the sixth overall edition of the X Cup. It took place from June 10 to July 13, 2008; the final took place at Victory Road. The tournament featured TNA wrestlers as well as wrestlers from other promotions, including New Japan Pro-Wrestling. It consisted of four rounds. The first round consisted of two tag team matches, the second round consisted of four singles matches, the third round was a 12-man four-way tag team elimination match, and the fourth round was a four-way Ultimate X match. The tournament winner was Team Mexico, which consisted of team captain Kaz, Motor City Machine Guns (Alex Shelley and Chris Sabin), and Curry Man.

Team standings
Rank	Team	Wrestlers	No. of Matches	Wins	Losses	Points
1	Team Mexico	Kaz (captain)	5	3	2	7
1	Team Mexico	Alex Shelley	5	3	2	7
1	Team Mexico	Chris Sabin	5	3	2	7
1	Team Mexico	Curry Man	5	3	2	7
2	(United States) Team USA	Último Guerrero (captain)	5	3	2	6
2	(United States) Team USA	Averno	5	3	2	6
2	(United States) Team USA	Rey Bucanero	5	3	2	6
2	(United States) Team USA	Volador Jr.	5	3	2	6
3	Team Japan	Milano Collection A.T. (captain)	5	1	4	4
3	Team Japan	Masato Yoshino	5	1	4	4
3	Team Japan	Naruki Doi	5	1	4	4
3	Team Japan	Puma	5	1	4	4
4	(United Nations) Team International	Daivari (captain)	5	1	4	3
4	(United Nations) Team International	Alex Koslov	5	1	4	3
4	(United Nations) Team International	Doug Williams	5	1	4	3
4	(United Nations) Team International	Tyson Dux	5	1	4	3

=== 2017 Super X Cup ===
The 2017 Super X Cup was the third edition of the Super X Cup and the seventh overall edition of the X Cup. It took place from July 3 to August 17, 2017; the final took place at Impact!: Destination X. This edition was a standard single-elimination tournament with eight competitors: A. C. H., Andrew Everett, Davey Richards, Dezmond Xavier, Drago, Idris Abraham, Sammy Guevara, and Taiji Ishimori. The winner of the tournament was Dezmond Xavier, who defeated Ishimori in the final.

=== 2021 Super X Cup ===
The 2021 Super X Cup was the fourth edition of the Super X Cup and the eighth overall edition of the X Cup. It took place at Genesis on January 9, 2021, in Nashville, Tennessee. This edition was a standard single-elimination tournament with eight competitors: Ace Austin, Blake Christian, Cousin Jake, Crazzy Steve, Daivari, KC Navarro, Suicide, and Tre Lamar. The winner of the tournament was Ace Austin, who defeated Christian in the final.

=== 2026 World X-Cup ===
The 2026 World X-Cup was a tournament that took place at Destination X on November 15, 2026, in Edmonton, Alberta, Canada. The tournament was the fourth edition of the World X-Cup and the ninth overall edition of the X Cup. The World X-Cup was originally scheduled to feature six competitors in a single-elimination tournament with the first round consisting of two three-way matches on the Countdown to Destination X show and the winners in the first round competing in the final at Destination X. Due to travel issues caused by a nationwide ground stop issued by the Federal Aviation Authority (FAA) in the United States two days before Destination X, TNA was forced to make changes to the match card, including turning the tournament into a five-way elimination match involving five of the six announced participants. The countries represented were Belgium, Canada, Italy, Pakistan, and the United States. Rey Horus was originally set to represent Mexico, but due to travel issues, he was pulled from the World X-Cup. The winner of the 2026 World X-Cup was Belgium's Ricky Sosa, who defeated Amir Jordan, The Home Town Man, Jason Hotch, and Fabian Aichner.

== See also ==
- Impact Wrestling
- List of Total Nonstop Action Wrestling tournaments
- Professional wrestling tournament
- X Division
