= 2003 TNA Super X Cup Tournament =

2003 Total Nonstop Action Wrestling pay-per-view event

2003 Super X Cup
- Promotion: Total Nonstop Action Wrestling

Super X Cup chronology
← Previous; First	Next → 2005

X Cup Tournaments chronology
← Previous; First	Next → 2004 America's X Cup Tournament

2003 Super X Cup
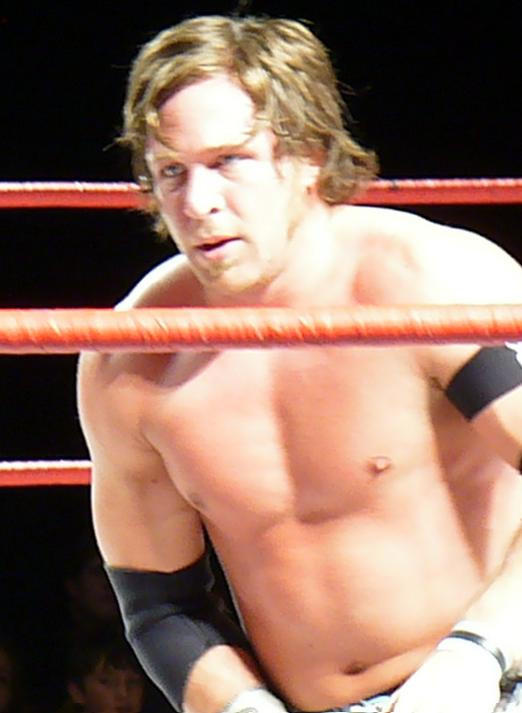
- 2003 Super X Cup winner Chris Sabin

Tournament information
- Sport: Professional wrestling
- Location: Nashville, Tennessee
- Dates: August 20, 2003–August 27, 2003
- Tournament format: Single elimination tournament
- Participants: 8

Final positions
- Champion: Chris Sabin
- Runner-up: Juventud Guerrera

Tournament statistics
- Matches played: 7

The 2003 Super X Cup Tournament was an X Cup professional wrestling X Division tournament and pay-per-view event produced by Total Nonstop Action Wrestling (TNA), which took place on August 20, 2003, at the TNA Asylum in Nashville, Tennessee. It was aired on September 3 via tape delay.

The event featured the first-ever eight-man Super X Cup Tournament, which was won by Chris Sabin, who defeated Juventud Guerrera in the tournament final. Aside from the tournament, the event featured the first-ever Wednesday, Bloody Wednesday match as the main event, in which the team of D-Lo Brown, Jeff Jarrett, Raven and America's Most Wanted (Chris Harris and James Storm) defeated AJ Styles, Christopher Daniels, Johnny Swinger, Shane Douglas and Simon Diamond, with Erik Watts serving as the special guest referee.

== Production ==
=== Background ===
The Super X Cup Tournament was an international tournament that featured X Division wrestlers from all over the world to compete in one-on-one matches, with the winner getting a shot at the TNA X Division Championship. The 2003 Super X Cup was the first X Cup Tournament of any kind for TNA Wrestling. Competitors from the United States, Canada, Mexico, Great Britain, and Japan wrestled in the Super X-Cup Tournament. Many of these competitors were brought back to TNA for future X Cup Tournaments.

== Results ==
=== Tournament brackets ===
Various wrestlers from around the globe, including Chris Sabin, Juventud Guerrera, Nosawa, Teddy Hart, and Jonny Storm, among others, competed in the Super X Cup Tournament. Chris Sabin defeated Jerry Lynn, Frankie Kazarian, and finally Juventud Guerrera to capture the Super X Cup. The tournament brackets were:

First round Super X Cup Special; August 20, 2003 (Aired September 3)
Juventud Guerrera	Pinfall
Nosawa	4:32
Jonny Storm	2:51
Teddy Hart	Pinfall
Chris Sabin	Pinfall
Jerry Lynn	3:38
Frankie Kazarian	Pinfall
Michael Shane	3:28

Semifinals; Super X Cup Special; August 20, 2003 (Aired September 3)
Juventud Guerrera	Pinfall
Teddy Hart	9:58
Chris Sabin	Pinfall
Frankie Kazarian	7:35

Final; Super X Cup Special; August 20, 2003 (Aired September 3)
Juventud Guerrera	14:45
Chris Sabin	Pinfall

== Aftermath ==
=== Short-term ===
Sabin challenged the X Division Champion Michael Shane to a match for Shane's X Division Championship and Sabin's Super X Cup was also on the line on October 8. Shane won the match to retain the title and win Sabin's Super X Cup trophy. However, Sabin is still officially recognized as the overall official winner of the 2003 Super X Cup.

=== Long-term ===
Since the debut of the 2003 Super X Cup Tournament, there have been various X Cup Tournaments held in TNA Wrestling throughout the years. Wrestlers from Total Nonstop Action Wrestling, Border City Wrestling, AAA, All Japan Pro Wrestling, New Japan Pro-Wrestling, and other promotions have competed in the various X Cup Tournaments that have been hosted by TNA.

== See also ==
- TNA X Cup Tournaments
- TNA 2004 America's X Cup Tournament
- TNA 2004 World X Cup Tournament
- TNA 2005 Super X Cup Tournament
- TNA 2006 World X Cup Tournament
- TNA 2008 World X Cup Tournament
