= 2004 TNA America's X Cup Tournament =

Total Nonstop Action Wrestling tournament

- Venue: TNA Asylum
- Location: Nashville, Tennessee
- Start date: February 11, 2004
- End date: March 31, 2004
- Competitors: Team AAA; Team Canada; Team NWA; Team UK

Champion
- Team AAA

The 2004 TNA America's X Cup Tournament was a X Division tournament that was produced by Total Nonstop Action Wrestling. It was the forerunner to the TNA 2004 World X Cup Tournament. America's X Cup Tournament consisted of four teams: Team USA (representing the National Wrestling Alliance/Total Nonstop Action Wrestling), Team Canada, Team Mexico (representing AAA), and Team Britain.

== History ==
Throughout America's X Cup Tournament, AAA's Team Mexico was extremely successful and dominant. They defeated Team USA, Team UK, and Team Canada. At the end of the tournament, Team AAA was victorious, upsetting the American Team and winning the trophy that Team USA was to defend. After America's X Cup Tournament ended, the World X Cup immediately followed. The World X Cup saw Team USA make a strong comeback. The World X Cup eventually culminated in an Ultimate X match which featured Team USA's Chris Sabin, Team Canada's Petey Williams, and Team Mexico's Hector Garza. Sabin won both the match and the tournament for Team USA.

== Teams and members ==
- Team NWA/USA
  - (United States) Jerry Lynn (Captain)
  - (United States) Chris Sabin
  - (United States) Elix Skipper
  - (United States) Sonjay Dutt
- Team Canada
  - (Canada) Teddy Hart (Captain)
  - (Canada) Jack Evans
  - (Canada) Johnny Devine
  - (Canada) Petey Williams
- Team AAA/Mexico
  - (Mexico) Juventud Guerrera (Captain – I & II)
  - (Mexico) Héctor Garza (Captain – III)
  - (Mexico) Abismo Negro
  - (Mexico) Mr. Águila
  - (Mexico) Heavy Metal
- Team Britain/UK
  - (United Kingdom) James Mason (Captain)
  - (United Kingdom) Robbie Dynamite
  - (United Kingdom) Xtreme Dean Allmark
  - (United Kingdom) Frankie Sloan

== Americas X Cup I ==
America's X Cup I took place on February 11, 2004. The tournament featured Team AAA and Team NWA facing off in the first ever tournament. The teams were captained by Juventud Guerrera representing Team AAA and Jerry Lynn representing Team NWA.

No.	Results	Stipulations	Time
1	Juventud Guerrera defeated Chris Sabin	Americas X Cup Round One Match	10:15
2	Héctor Garza defeated Sonjay Dutt	Americas X Cup Round One Match	4:50
3	Jerry Lynn defeated Mr. Águila	Americas X Cup Round One Match	7:46
4	Abismo Negro defeated Elix Skipper	Americas X Cup Round One Match	6:54
5	Team AAA (Abismo Negro and Juventud Guerrera) defeated Team NWA (Jerry Lynn and Sonjay Dutt)	Americas X Cup Round Two Tag Team Match	11:37
6	Team NWA (Elix Skipper and Chris Sabin) defeated Team AAA (Héctor Garza and Mr. Águila)	Americas X Cup Round Two Tag Team Match	10:50
7	Team AAA (Abismo Negro, Héctor Garza, Juventud Guerrera and Mr. Águila) defeat Team NWA (Chris Sabin, Elix Skipper, Jerry Lynn and Sonjay Dutt)	Americas X Cup Round Three Eight Man Tag Team Elimination Match	22:18

== See also ==
- TNA X Cup Tournaments
- TNA 2003 Super X Cup Tournament
- TNA 2004 World X Cup Tournament
- TNA 2005 Super X Cup Tournament
- TNA 2006 World X Cup Tournament
- TNA 2008 World X Cup Tournament
