= Team Japan =

Professional wrestling stable

Stable
- Members: See below

Team Japan is a professional wrestling group that was brought together as a part of Total Nonstop Action Wrestling's World X Cup Tournament.

== History ==
=== 2004 ===
Team Japan started as six-man team as team captain Nosawa from All Japan Pro Wrestling teamed with Osaka Pro Wrestling's Ebessan and Kamen competed in non-tournament exhibition match. They lost to Elix Skipper, Sonjay Dutt and Chris Sabin. For the World X-Cup event in May 2008, Nosawa dropped Ebessan and Kamen and replaced them with Mitsu Hirai Jr., Ryuji Hijikata and Taichi Ishikari, all of whom were like Nosawa from All Japan. They enjoyed some success in exhibitions and singles matches not related to the tournament itself, but failed to have any significant success in the actual tournament and were quickly eliminated, leaving Team Canada, Team Mexico, and Team USA for the finals which were held under Ultimate X rules.

After the X-Cup event, Nosawa teamed with fellow All Japan wrestler Kazushi Miyamoto for several months under the Team Japan name. They disappeared from TNA after Victory Road.

=== 2006 ===
Team Japan returned to TNA for the TNA 2006 World X-Cup Tournament. On the March 11, 2006 episode of TNA Impact!, Mike Tenay said that Puma would be on Team Japan for the competition. Jushin Thunder Liger was shortly thereafter announced to be the captain of the team.

Rumored members of the team included Hiroshi Tanahashi, Black Tiger, and Tiger Mask. Oddly, the character of Black Tiger has always been that of a heel in Japan while Tiger Mask is the babyface. The characters are that of "twins" with Black Tiger being the "evil twin". They do not tag and this would have been considered an unusual decision for TNA to make. These were proven as nothing more than rumors, and none of the rumored competitors were included on the team.

Team Japan made its return at TNA Lockdown 2006, with members Hirooki Goto, Minoru Tanaka, and Black Tiger competing in an exhibition six man tag match against Team USA members Jay Lethal, Sonjay Dutt, and Alex Shelley. Team Japan pulled out the win in light of miscommunication on the part of Team USA.

Liger was supposed to be a part of the exhibition competitions at Lockdown, as he was slated to face off with Christopher Daniels. Due to travel conflicts, Liger was unable to make the pay-per-view, and TNA had to alter the card, declaring Daniels' opponent to be a mystery competitor. The competitor was later announced to be Senshi.

Liger did, however, compete in a second round match against Petey Williams from Team Canada. Liger pulled out the win after a double underhook faceplant after teammates Hiroko Goto and Black Tiger interfered in the match.

Team Japan was heavily favored to win the 2006 World X-Cup in light of TNA's talent-swap agreement with New Japan Pro-Wrestling, but to the surprise of many, the team finished in last place. It is speculated that this may be due to a lack of participation from Team Captain, Jushin Thunder Liger who only made on-screen appearances in the tournament during Sacrifice. All four members of the 2006 Team Japan were also members of Liger's heel Control Terrorism Unit (C.T.U.) stable from NJPW.

=== 2008 ===
Team Japan returned to TNA Wrestling for the 2008 World X-Cup. Naruki Doi and Masato Yoshino debuted on the June 12 edition of "Impact!" with a loss to The Motor City Machine Guns of Team TNA. Team Mexico would go on to win the World X Cup. American T. J. Perkins, performing as Puma, became the first wrestler to represent two different countries in the World X Cup, having wrestled as part of Team Mexico in 2006.

== Members ==
=== 2004 ===
- (Japan) NOSAWA (Captain)
- (Japan) Kuishinbo Kamen (Never wrestled in the 2004 World X Cup)
- (Japan) Mitsunobu Kikuzawa (Never wrestled in the 2004 World X Cup)
- (Japan) Mitsu Hirai Jr.
- (Japan) Ryuji Hijikata
- (Japan) Taichi Ishikari
- (Japan) Miyamoto (Joined TNA after the 2004 World X Cup)

=== 2006 ===
- (Japan) Jushin Liger (Captain)
- (United States) Black Tiger IV
- (Japan) Minoru Tanaka
- (Japan) Hirooki Goto

=== 2008 ===
- (Japan) Milano Collection A.T. (Captain)
- (United States) Puma
- (Japan) Naruki Doi
- (Japan) Masato Yoshino
- (Japan) Taichi Ishikari (Never wrestled as part of the team, was replaced by Puma)

== Competitive Record ==
=== World X Cup Record ===
Competition	Notes	Position	Points	Captain
2004 America's X Cup	Did not Enter			
2004 World X Cup		4th	2	NOSAWA
2006 World X Cup		4th	3	Jushin Thunder Liger
2008 World X Cup		3rd	4	Milano Collection A.T.
