= Team UK =

Team UK may refer to:

- Team Britain, a former professional wrestling stable
- United Kingdom national quidditch team

== See also ==
- Team GB, the British Olympic Association
