= TNA Lockdown (2006) =

2006 Total Nonstop Action Wrestling pay-per-view event

Lockdown (2006)
- Promotional poster featuring Sting
- Promotion: Total Nonstop Action Wrestling
- Date: April 23, 2006
- City: Orlando, Florida
- Venue: Impact Zone
- Attendance: 900
- Tagline: Six Sides of Steel

Pay-per-view chronology
← Previous; Destination X	Next → Sacrifice

Lockdown chronology
← Previous; 2005	Next → 2007

The 2006 Lockdown was a professional wrestling pay-per-view (PPV) event produced by Total Nonstop Action Wrestling (TNA), which took place on April 23, 2006, at the Impact Zone in Orlando, Florida. It was the second annual event under the Lockdown chronology. Eight matches were featured on the event's card. In the concept of Lockdown events, every match took place inside a steel structure with six sides, known as Six Sides of Steel. This event also marked the TNA debut of Christy Hemme. The event was featured in the House episode "Act Your Age".

In October 2017, with the launch of the Global Wrestling Network, the event became available to stream on demand.

== Results ==
No.	Results	Stipulations	Times
1	Team Japan (Black Tiger, Minoru Tanaka and Hirooki Goto) defeated Team USA (Sonjay Dutt, Jay Lethal and Alex Shelley)	X Division Six-man tag team Six Sides of Steel match	12:03
2	Senshi defeated Christopher Daniels	Six Sides of Steel match	12:05
3	Bob Armstrong (with B.G. James and Kip James) defeated Konnan (with Homicide and Hernandez)	Arm Wrestling challenge	0:00
4	Chris Sabin defeated Elix Skipper (with Simon Diamond), Petey Williams (with Coach D'Amore), Chase Stevens, Shark Boy and Puma	Xscape match	12:52
5	Samoa Joe (c) defeated Sabu	Six Sides of Steel match for the TNA X Division Championship	6:10
6	Team 3D (Brother Ray, Brother Devon and Brother Runt) defeated Team Canada (Bobby Roode, Eric Young and A-1) (with Coach D'Amore)	Six-man tag team Six Sides of Steel Anthem match	8:47
7	Christian Cage (c) defeated Abyss (with James Mitchell)	Six Sides of Steel match for the NWA World Heavyweight Championship	14:07
8	Sting's Warriors (Sting, A.J. Styles, Ron Killings and Rhino) defeated Jeff Jarrett's Army (Jeff Jarrett, Scott Steiner, Chris Harris and James Storm) (with Gail Kim and Jackie Gayda)	Lethal Lockdown match	25:23
(c) / – the champion(s) heading into the match

=== Xscape match ===
1.

Elimination no.	Eliminated	Eliminator	Notes
1	Shark Boy	Petey Williams	Pinned after a Canadian Destroyer
2	Chase Stevens	Elix Skipper	Pinned after a Sudden Death
3	Elix Skipper	Petey Williams	Pinned by a Sunset Flip
4	Puma	Chris Sabin	Pinned after a Cradle Shock
Loser	Petey Williams	N/A	Williams failed to escape the cage and touch the floor before Sabin
Winner	Chris Sabin	N/A	Sabin escaped the cage and touched the floor before Williams
