= 2004 TNA World X Cup Tournament =

2004 World X Cup
TNA 2004 World X Cup Tournament

Tournament details
- Host country: United States
- Teams: 4
- Venue: 1

Final positions
- Champions: United States (1st title)
- Runners-up: Canada
- Third place: Mexico
- Fourth place: Japan

The TNA 2004 World X Cup Tournament was an X Division tournament that was hosted by Total Nonstop Action Wrestling. It was the successor to America's X Cup Tournament.

== History ==
America's X Cup Tournament was used somewhat as a preview for the World X Cup Tournament. America's X Cup featured four Teams: Team USA (representing the National Wrestling Alliance/Total Nonstop Action Wrestling), Team Canada, Team Mexico (representing AAA), and Team Britain. The concept of America's X Cup was that it was to be defended by Team USA against challengers from around the world. In an upsetting turn of events for Team USA, Team Mexico virtually dominated the international competition and ended up being the eventual winners of America's X Cup.

== Rules ==
The competition is divided into four rounds.

- In Round One, there will be a gauntlet involving all 16 wrestlers. The winner gets three points for their respective team. The runner-up gets one point for their respective team.
- In Round Two, there are two tag team matches. The winners get two points for their respective teams.
- In Round Three, there will be a Ladder match involving 1 member from each team. The winner gets four points for their respective teams.
- In Round Four, there will be an Ultimate X match involving 1 member from the top 3 teams. (The team in last place is eliminated). The winner gets five points for their respective team.
- In the event of a tie, the captains of the two teams will compete in a singles match in order to determine the champion.

== Teams and Members ==
- Team TNA
  - (United States) Jerry Lynn (Captain)
  - (United States) Christopher Daniels
  - (United States) Chris Sabin
  - (United States) Elix Skipper
- Team Canada
  - (Canada) Petey Williams (Captain)
  - (Canada) Johnny Devine
  - (Canada) Bobby Roode
  - (Canada) Eric Young
- Team Mexico
  - (Mexico) Héctor Garza (Captain)
  - (Mexico) Abismo Negro
  - (Mexico) Heavy Metal
  - (Mexico) Mr. Águila
- Team Japan
  - (Japan) NOSAWA (Captain)
  - (Japan) Ryuji Hijikata
  - (Japan) Mitsu Hirai Jr.
  - (Japan) Taichi Ishikari

== Preview Matches ==
- TNA Weekly PPV 91: April 28, 2004
  - (United States) Team TNA defeated Team Mexico
- TNA Weekly PPV 92: May 5, 2004
  - Team Canada defeated (United States) Team TNA
- TNA Weekly PPV 93: May 12, 2004
  - Team Canada's Bobby Roode & Petey Williams defeated Team Mexico's Héctor Garza & Abismo Negro
- TNA Weekly PPV 94: May 19, 2004
  - (United States) Team TNA's Jerry Lynn defeated Team Canada's Bobby Roode
  - Team Mexico defeated Team Japan

== Results ==
=== Round One (The Gauntlet) - 3 Points ===
- TNA Weekly PPV 95: May 26, 2004
  - 16-man Gauntlet: Team Mexico's Héctor Garza was the last remaining competitor, thus winning the match. (United States) Team TNA's Elix Skipper was the runner-up, thus earning Team TNA one point.

=== Round Two (Tag Team Matches) - 2 Points ===
- TNA Weekly PPV 95: May 26, 2004
  - (United States) Team TNA's (Christopher Daniels and Elix Skipper) defeated Team Canada's (Bobby Roode and Johnny Devine)
  - Team Japan's (Ryuji Hijikata and Mitsu Hirai Jr.) defeated Team Mexico's (Abismo Negro and Heavy Metal)

=== Round Three (Ladder Match) - 4 Points ===
- TNA Weekly PPV 95: May 26, 2004
  - Team Canada's Eric Young defeated (United States) Team TNA's Jerry Lynn, Team Mexico's Mr. Águila and Team Japan's Taichi Ishikari

=== Round Four (Ultimate X Match) - 5 Points ===
- TNA Weekly PPV 95: May 26, 2004
  - (United States) Team TNA's Chris Sabin defeated Team Canada's Petey Williams and Team Mexico's Héctor Garza

== Standings ==
| Standings | Team | Points |
|---|---|---|
| First | (United States) Team TNA | 8 |
| Second | Team Canada | 4 |
| Third | Team Mexico | 3 |
| Fourth | Team Japan | 2 |

== World X Cup Events ==
The World X Cup Tournament began almost immediately after Team AAA was decisively victorious in America's X Cup Tournament. Team Britain departed from TNA after America's X Cup ended, and Team Japan was brought in to fill the gap. Several Team changes were also made during the World X Cup. Team Mexico's Captain, Juventud Guerrera, was released from TNA after an in-ring accident involving Team USA's Captain, Jerry Lynn. Hector Garza took Guerrera's place as the Team Captain during the end of America's X Cup and the entire duration of the World X Cup. Jack Evans and Teddy Hart both departed from TNA. Jack Evans' departure was due to TNA and Ring of Honor cutting ties in 2004 amidst Rob Feinstein's pedophilia scandal, while Teddy Hart was released from the company following an altercation at a restaurant with CM Punk stemming from an ROH show, where Sabu had to separate the two. Teddy, the former captain of Team Canada, was replaced by Eric Young, while Jack Evans would be replaced by Bobby Roode. In addition, Petey Williams would be named the new captain of Team Canada by their "coach", Scott D'Amore

Despite a strong showing from Team Mexico during America's X Cup events, Team USA enjoyed the majority of the success during the World X Cup. Team Japan was eventually eliminated from the tournament and it came down to the United States vs. Canada vs. Mexico in an Ultimate X match. Representing Team Canada was "The Canadian Destroyer" Captain Petey Williams. Representing Team Mexico was Captain Hector Garza. Despite the fact that both Canada and Mexico used their Team Captains for the Ultimate X match, Team USA was represented by Captain Jerry Lynn's hand-picked selection, Chris Sabin. This proved to be a wise decision for Team USA, as Sabin was able to defeat Williams and Garza and win the World X Cup Tournament for Team USA and the NWA/TNA.

== See also ==
- TNA X Cup Tournaments
- TNA 2003 Super X Cup Tournament
- TNA 2004 America's X Cup Tournament
- TNA 2005 Super X Cup Tournament
- TNA 2006 World X Cup Tournament
- TNA 2008 World X Cup Tournament
