= Team Britain =

Professional wrestling stable

Stable
- Members: See below
- Debut: 31 March 2004

Team Britain, or Team UK, was a professional wrestling stable brought together to compete in Total Nonstop Action Wrestling's 2004 America's X-Cup Tournament and TNA World Cup 2013. Also, a Team Britain was formed in 2006, but it never was used.

== History ==
=== 2004 ===
Team Britain didn't have a major role in TNA 2004 America's X-Cup as the Cup was mostly highlighted by Team Canada, Team Mexico (or Team AAA), and Team USA (or Team NWA). Team Britain, captained by Dave Taylor and consisting of James Mason, Dean Allmark, Robbie Dynamite and Frankie Sloan, would face off against Team Mexico on April 7, 2004 in a losing effort. They did not partake in the World X-Cup event in May.

=== 2006 ===
Team Britain was slated to return to TNA for the 2006 World X-Cup Tournament. When Team Canada's coach Scott D'Amore mentioned his Team's (so far) lack of involvement in the World X Cup he referred to a "Team UK" (first thought to be a possible misnaming of Team Britain) while listing a host of other possible entries. The return of the team and its participants were confirmed on the March 17, 2006 in a press release on the Frontier Wrestling Alliance (FWA):

"The Wonderkid" Jonny Storm, "The Phoenix" Jody Fleisch and "The Anarchist" Doug Williams will put differences aside when they travel to America to represent Team UK in the TNA X Division Cup in mid-May. The three FWA stars will be joined by ROH's Nigel McGuinness in the British squad to compete against teams from other countries for the X Cup in Florida.

Team Britain became the only team that did not return to the tournament, however, due to its members having conflicting schedules.

=== 2013 ===
At TNA One Night Only, World Cup, Team UK was formed again. The captain was Magnus and the other members, Douglas Williams, Rob Terry, Rockstar Spud and Hannah Blossom. However, Team UK tied with Team International for 3rd place.

== Members ==
- 2004

- James Mason (Captain)
- Robbie Dynamite
- Xtreme Dean Allmark
- Frankie Sloan
- David Taylor (Coach / Mentor)

- 2006

- Nigel McGuinness (Captain)
- Doug Williams
- Jonny Storm
- Jody Fleisch

Note: The 2006 team was reported and confirmed, but ultimately did not partake in the TNA 2006 World X-Cup Tournament

- 2013

- Magnus (Captain)
- Douglas Williams
- Rob Terry
- Rockstar Spud
- Hannah Blossom

== Competitive record ==
=== World X Cup record ===
| Competition | Notes | Position | Points | Captain |
|---|---|---|---|---|
| 2004 America's X Cup | | N/A | N/A | James Mason |
| 2004 World X Cup | Did not Enter | | | Nigel McGuinness |
| 2006 World X Cup | Did not Enter | | | |
| 2008 World X Cup | Did not Enter | | | |
| 2013 World Cup of Wrestling | | 3rd | 1 | Magnus |

== See also ==
- The British Invasion (professional wrestling)
