= Planet Jarrett =

Professional wrestling stable

Stable
- Members: See below
- Name(s): Planet Jarrett; Jeff Jarrett's Army
- Debut: February 2005
- Disbanded: October 2006

Planet Jarrett was a professional wrestling stable in Total Nonstop Action Wrestling (TNA), led by the eponymous Jeff Jarrett and containing many of the main event heels in the promotion. It replaced the Kings of Wrestling as the dominant heel faction in TNA in February 2005, and remained prominent until totally disbanding upon the commencement of Jarrett's leave of absence from TNA television in October 2006. The stable was also known as (Jeff) Jarrett's Army.

== History ==
=== Kevin Nash and Diamond Dallas Page ===
NWA World Heavyweight Champion Jeff Jarrett was left alone following the dissolution of the Kings of Wrestling in early 2005, with Scott Hall sidelined due to personal problems and Kevin Nash newly turned face and pursuing Jarrett's title. At Against All Odds on February 13, Jarrett defended his title against Nash. In the course of the match, Billy Gunn (who was released by World Wrestling Entertainment in November 2004) entered the ring and gave Nash a chair shot, thus shifting the momentum of the match towards Jarrett and enabling him to defeat Nash and retain his title.

Jarrett was accompanied by Gunn (identified as "The Outlaw") on the February 18 episode of TNA Impact!, when TNA Director of Authority Dusty Rhodes forced Jarrett to defend his title against Diamond Dallas Page at Destination X. Over the following weeks, Jarrett assembled a force to counter Page's allies, recruiting Larry Zbyszko, his lawyer Mr. Daggett, Tim Welch, Chris Candido and The Naturals (Chase Stevens and Andy Douglas). The build-up of forces on each side culminated in a "Ringside Revenge match" on March 13 at Destination X, with Jarrett's allies and Page's allies both surrounding the ring during the title match. After Daggett entered the ring towards the end of the match, "The Alpha Male" Monty Brown entered the ring, apparently in order to stop Daggett from interfering in the match. Brown, at that point arguably the most over face in TNA, turned on Page, however, and sided with Jarrett, hitting Page with his signature "Pounce" maneuver and enabling Jarrett to retain his title once more.

Jarrett held a celebratory party on the March 18 episode of Impact!, which was attended by Daggett, Brown, Candido and The Naturals. Later that night, Jarrett explained that Brown had been frustrated at not receiving a title shot, and so had aligned himself with Jarrett. Brown then announced that he, Jarrett and The Outlaw were going to "take over" TNA. On the March 25 episode of Impact!, Dusty Rhodes announced that, at Lockdown, Jarrett, Brown and The Outlaw would face Nash, Page and Nash's friend Sean Waltman in a "Lethal Lockdown match": a six man tag match held inside a steel cage, with two wrestlers starting in the ring and another (randomly determined) wrestler entering the ring every two minutes. Moreover, the usage of weapons throughout the match would be perfectly legal.

Over the next several weeks, Planet Jarrett had several confrontations with Nash and his allies. Nash overpowered Candido and The Naturals on the April 8 episode of Impact!, leaving Candido using a wheelchair with a cast on his leg. The following week, Daggett informed Nash that he would be thrown out of the arena by security if he approached Candido or any other member of Planet Jarrett. This led to Nash being evicted from the building, allowing Brown and The Outlaw to defeat Page and Waltman in a tag match (with the assistance of Jarrett, who broke a guitar over Waltman's head).

Nash was unable to wrestle at Lockdown on April 24 due to a staph infection, and was replaced by B.G. James. Jarrett and Waltman began in the cage, with The Outlaw entering after five minutes. Waltman was thus outnumbered for two minutes, until Page entered the ring, wielding a kendo stick. However, Brown entered the ring two minutes later, once again giving Planet Jarrett a numerical advantage. James was the last entrant, and his presence enabled Waltman and Page to fight back and defeat Planet Jarrett.

Following Lockdown, Planet Jarrett began to dwindle in number. Daggett and Zbyszko disappeared without explanation, while Candido unexpectedly died as a result of a blood clot following complications that arose during a surgery to correct an ankle injury he sustained during Lockdown. As a result of Candido's death, The Naturals became de facto faces, as the sudden loss of their manager generated a degree of sympathy for the young tag team. The Outlaw remained in Planet Jarrett, but was distracted by his rivalry with the 3Live Kru.

=== A.J. Styles and Raven ===
At Hard Justice on May 15, Jarrett defended the NWA World Heavyweight Championship against perennial challenger and long-term enemy A.J. Styles, while Brown and The Outlaw faced Diamond Dallas Page and 3Live Kru member Ron "The Truth" Killings. Brown pinned Page to win the tag match, but Jarrett lost his title to Styles following botched interference from Brown (who accidentally "Pounced" Jarrett) and a knockout punch from guest referee Tito Ortiz, who responded forcefully when a frustrated Jarrett pushed him during the match. After three months, Planet Jarrett had lost the NWA World Heavyweight Championship.

On the May 20 episode of Impact!, Jarrett complained to Styles that Ortiz had been a biased referee. Jarrett and Brown then attacked Styles until Abyss entered the ring. The perpetually mute Abyss initially looked as though he would attack Jarrett and Brown, but instead delivered his signature "Black Hole Slam" maneuver to the already hurt Styles, much to the delight of Jarrett and Brown. After Abyss defeated Chris Sabin in the main event of the evening, Jarrett entered the ring to celebrate with his supposed teammate. However, Abyss promptly delivered the Black Hole Slam to Jarrett, indicating that he was not part of Planet Jarrett. The following weeks, Styles and Waltman defeated Jarrett and Brown in a tag match when Jarrett accidentally hit Brown with a guitar. The announcement by Dusty Rhodes that at Slammiversary Styles would defend the NWA World Heavyweight Championship in a match which included both Jarrett and Brown appeared to further exacerbate the cracks developing in the unity of Planet Jarrett.

At Slammiversary on June 19, Styles defended his title in a King of the Mountain match which included Raven, Abyss, Brown and Waltman. Jarrett was scheduled to be in the main event, but was removed from the main event and replaced with Raven after he assaulted a "fan" who was heckling him. Raven went on to win the match, climbing the ladder after subduing Brown with a Raven Effect DDT.

Abyss, who was close to winning at Slammiversary before he was knocked off the ladder by Raven, was awarded a title shot at No Surrender, much to the chagrin of Jarrett. Jarrett was furious at having been "overlooked", and began taking out his frustrations on the TNA roster, hitting Zach Gowen with a guitar on the July 8 episode of Impact!. While Jarrett was preoccupied with the NWA World Heavyweight Championship, Brown was drawn into the ongoing feud between The Outlaw (who had by now renamed himself "Kip James") and the 3Live Kru.

=== Rhino ===
At the outset of No Surrender on July 17, an increasingly paranoid Jarrett, by now convinced that he would be imminently fired and replaced, questioned play-by-play commentator Mike Tenay, asking him when the sixteen wrestlers fired from WWE that month would arrive in TNA. Tenay informed Jarrett that Rhino was scheduled to debut in TNA that night. Throughout No Surrender, Jarrett approached other wrestlers backstage and warned them that their jobs might also be in peril, thus gaining the support of Team Canada. Jarrett also instructed Larry Zbyszko (by now the TNA Director of Authority, having replaced Dusty Rhodes) to warn Rhino that Jarrett was waiting for him. Following the main event, in which Raven defeated Abyss to retain the NWA World Heavyweight Championship, Jarrett entered the ring and threatened to give Raven a "reality check". At that point, Rhino entered the ring and "Gored!" Raven before celebrating with Jarrett. Rhino was the newest member of Planet Jarrett.

After Jarrett and Rhino attacked the outnumbered Raven on the July 22 episode of Impact!, Sabu made his return to TNA on July 29, helping Raven fight off Jarrett and Rhino. This led to a tag match between Raven and Sabu and Planet Jarrett (Jarrett and Rhino) at Sacrifice on August 14. At the beginning of Sacrifice, Jarrett asked Zbyszko for a title shot. Zbyszko agreed that Jarrett would receive a title shot if he pinned Raven, but warned him that, should he be pinned by Raven, he would be banned from receiving a title shot for a year. Later that night, Jarrett tried to convince The Naturals to rejoin Planet Jarrett, but they refused.

In the main event of Sacrifice, the suspended Jeff Hardy returned to TNA by attacking Jarrett and hitting him with a swanton bomb. When Raven tried to take advantage and put the Raven Effect DDT on Jarrett, Rhino Gored! Raven and pinned him. An irate Jarrett then learned that Rhino would be the one who received a title shot at Unbreakable on September 11.

On the August 19 episode of Impact!, Jarrett demanded that Rhino give him his title shot, but Rhino refused, instead offering Jarrett a title shot if he won the NWA World Heavyweight Championship from Raven. Later in the program, Monty Brown mocked Kip James's unsuccessful attempts to recruit B.G. James into Planet Jarrett. On August 26, The Alpha Male exhorted James to follow his leadership and "hunt together". Jarrett then warned Brown that Planet Jarrett were in fact "the hunted". While James affirmed his loyalty to Jarrett, Brown left Planet Jarrett by claiming that he had never trusted Jarrett, and that the agreement they had made was broken. At Unbreakable, Brown and Jarrett both demanded a title shot at Bound for Glory from Zbyszko, with Kip James (unsuccessfully) attempting to defuse the situation and persuade Brown to apologize to Jarrett. That same night, Jarrett's attempt to help Rhino defeat Raven was foiled by Jeff Hardy.

=== The "Controversy in Canada" ===
Having suffered several defeats, Jarrett devised a new way to regain the NWA World Heavyweight Championship. At an untelevised Border City Wrestling show with several TNA wrestlers in attendance, Jarrett defeated Raven for the title following the unanticipated interference of America's Most Wanted, thus becoming a four-time champion. TNA Championship Committee Member Larry Zbyszko, who was in attendance at the time, declared the title change official.

Events on the October 1 episode of Impact! saw the beginnings of a feud between America's Most Wanted and the debuting Team 3D, while the returning Kevin Nash challenged Jarrett to a match for the NWA World Heavyweight Championship at Bound For Glory. The following week, the debuting Gail Kim interfered on the behalf of America's Most Wanted during their scheduled tag team match with Team 3D, apparently joining Planet Jarrett.

On October 15, a vignette aired on Impact! showing a "funeral" delivered for the careers of Team 3D. Father James Mitchell presided, with America's Most Wanted delivering a eulogy. Jarrett, Kim, Team Canada and Abyss were also in attendance, and the guest book was signed with the names of several key WWE officials ("Vince and Linda", "Paul and Stephanie", "Paul H." and "Pat and Sylvan", the last of which was an inside reference to rumors surrounding the circumstances in which "Sylvan" was hired by "Pat"). At the end of the funeral, Planet Jarrett claimed that they would return to the funeral parlour the day after Bound For Glory to bury the career of Kevin Nash as well.

Planet Jarrett were, however, denied the opportunity to "bury" Nash at Bound For Glory after he was withdrawn from the event due to the onset of an illness during the afternoon before the pay-per-view. Jarrett brought a casket to the event regardless, claiming that he would "bury" someone that night. In light of the circumstances, Championship Committee Member Larry Zbyszko announced that Jarrett would defend his title against the winner of a ten man over-the-top rope gauntlet match. The winner of the gauntlet match was Rhino, who went on to defeat Jarrett despite heavy interference, presumably leaving Planet Jarrett in the process. Following the match, Jarrett, America's Most Wanted and Team Canada attacked Rhino and threw him into the casket. However, Rhino was saved by the 3 Live Kru - now being openly assisted by Kip James - and the returning Team 3D. The event ended with Team Canada member Eric Young trapped in the coffin, while Rhino celebrated with the NWA World Heavyweight Championship.

On a special two-hour episode of Impact! on November 3, Jarrett defeated Rhino to regain the NWA World Heavyweight Championship, once again with the assistance of America's Most Wanted (who, earlier that night, had attacked and handcuffed Team 3D to prevent them from foiling their interference).

=== Christian Cage and Sting ===
Jarrett and America's Most Wanted lost to Rhino and Team 3D in a six-man tag team match at Genesis on November 13. That same night, the debuting Christian Cage opted not to join Team Canada, instead assaulting Scott D'Amore before helping Team 3D drive Jarrett through a table. On the November 26, 2005 episode of Impact!, Jackie Gayda debuted in TNA, immediately confronting Jarrett. She later claimed to have information on the "Controversy in Canada", and began attempting to blackmail Jarrett using the (undisclosed) information.

With the assistance of Team Canada, Jarrett successfully defended the NWA World Heavyweight Championship against Rhino at Turning Point on December 11. Immediately following the match, the arena lights dimmed and images of scorpions appeared on the arena screens. When the lighting returned, the baseball bat, boots and trench coat of Sting were draped on a chair in the center of the ring.

The debut of Cage and scheduled return of Sting at Final Resolution appeared to frighten Jarrett. On the December 17 episode of Impact!, Jarrett appealed to Monty Brown, claiming that their positions in TNA were being endangered by the incoming wrestlers. Brown agreed with Jarrett, apparently reforging their alliance. At Final Resolution, Jarrett and Brown were defeated by Cage and Sting, with Sting pinning Jarrett following a Scorpion Deathdrop. On the following episode of Impact!, Sting announced his retirement (although Team Canada member Eric Young would later claim that Sting had not left).

At Against All Odds on February 12, Christian Cage defeated Jarrett for the NWA World Heavyweight Championship. The guest referee for the match was former WWE official Earl Hebner. Shortly before Against All Odds, Jarrett recruited Alex Shelley to obtain footage of Jackie Gayda and Sting using his "Shelley-cam". Shelley later presented Jarrett with (unseen) footage of Gayda, informing Jarrett that "she's a kinky dame!" Jarrett used the film to blackmail Gayda, forcing her to join his stable.

At Destination X on March 12, Christian Cage successfully retained the NWA World Heavyweight Championship in a match with Monty Brown. Following the match, Jarrett demanded a rematch against Cage, but he refused. Jarrett and Abyss then attacked Cage, with Monty Brown assisting them. After Rhino attempted to save Cage, Team Canada and the remainder of Planet Jarrett also entered the ring, leaving Cage and Rhino outnumbered. Cage and Rhino were assaulted until Sting made his return, clearing the ring with a baseball bat and locking Jarrett in the Scorpion Deathlock. He maintained the hold until the debuting Scott Steiner knocked him down and placed him in the Steiner Recliner, joining Planet Jarrett.

In response, Sting recruited Samoa Joe to team with him in a tag match against Jeff Jarrett and Scott Steiner at Sacrifice, where Joe scored the pin on Jarrett to win. The following month, Jarrett emerged as the only member of the faction present in the main event King of the Mountain match at Slammiversary. Jarrett won the match, utilizing help from referee Earl Hebner and official Larry Zbyszko. Jarrett would retain the title against Sting at Hard Justice thanks to interference from Christian Cage. He later lost the championship to Sting in a Title vs Career match at Bound for Glory, disappearing from television afterwards.

== Members ==
- Jeff Jarrett (leader)
- Abyss, with James Mitchell
- America's Most Wanted (Chris Harris and James Storm)
- Monty Brown
- Team Canada (Petey Williams, A-1, Eric Young, Johnny Devine and Bobby Roode, with Coach D'Amore)
- Kip James
- Gail Kim
- Alex Shelley
- Jackie Gayda
- Scott Steiner
- Larry Zbyszko
- Rhino

== Championships and accomplishments ==
- Total Nonstop Action Wrestling
  - NWA World Heavyweight Championship (4 times) - Jeff Jarrett
  - NWA World Tag Team Championship (1 time) - America's Most Wanted (Chris Harris and James Storm)
  - 2006 King of the Mountain - Jeff Jarrett
  - Finisher of the Year (2005) - Petey Williams
- Wrestling Observer Newsletter awards
  - Best Wrestling Maneuver (2005) - Petey Williams
  - Most Overrated Wrestler (2005) - Jeff Jarrett
  - Tag Team of the Year (2005) - America's Most Wanted (Chris Harris and James Storm)
