= No Surrender (2005) =

2005 Total Nonstop Action Wrestling pay-per-view event

- Promotional poster featuring A.J. Styles, Chris Harris, Christopher Daniels, and Jeff Jarrett
- Promotion: Total Nonstop Action Wrestling
- Date: July 17, 2005
- City: Orlando, Florida
- Venue: Impact Zone
- Attendance: 775

Pay-per-view chronology
← Previous; Slammiversary	Next → Sacrifice

No Surrender chronology
← Previous; First	Next → 2006

The 2005 No Surrender was a professional wrestling pay-per-view (PPV) event produced by the Total Nonstop Action Wrestling (TNA) promotion, which took place on July 17, 2005 at the Impact Zone in Orlando, Florida. It was the first under the No Surrender chronology and the seventh event in the 2005 TNA PPV schedule.

Ten matches were contested at the event, including one on the pre-show. In this main event, Raven defeated Abyss in a Dog Collar match to retain the NWA World Heavyweight Championship. In other prominent matches, Christopher Daniels defeated Petey Williams to retain the TNA X Division Championship, AJ Styles defeated Sean Waltman in which Jerry Lynn served as the special guest referee, and Samoa Joe defeated Chris Sabin. The event was also notable for the TNA debut of Rhino.

Jason Clevett of the professional wrestling section of the Canadian Online Explorer rated the show an 8 out of 10, equal with the 2006 event's ranking of 8 out of 10 also by Clevett.

== Production ==
=== Background ===
TNA announced in late-April 2005 that they were planning to host a PPV titled No Surrender on July 17 at the TNA Impact! Zone in Orlando, Florida. Prior to No Surrender, TNA's television contract with Fox Sports Net ended. This left TNA without a broadcaster for several weeks. As a result, TNA began airing weekly episodes of their television program TNA Impact! on their official website in order to build storylines and promote the No Surrender PPV event. In an article by TNA columnist Bill Banks, it was reported that some "new talent" could debut at No Surrender. TNA released a poster promoting the event featuring A.J. Styles, Chris Harris, Christopher Daniels, and Jeff Jarrett at some point beforehand.

=== Storylines ===
No Surrender featured nine professional wrestling matches and one pre-show match that involved wrestlers from pre-existing scripted feuds and storylines portraying villains, heroes, or less distinguishable characters; these scripted events built tension and culminated in a wrestling match or series of matches.

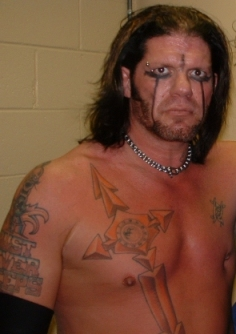
Raven (pictured) challenged Abyss to a No Surrender Dog Collar match for the NWA World Heavyweight Championship at No Surrender.

The main event at No Surrender was a No Surrender Dog Collar match for the NWA World Heavyweight Championship between then-champion Raven and the challenger Abyss. On the June 24 episode of Impact!, James Mitchell returned to the promotion in a backstage segment with Abyss. Mitchell propositioned Abyss on the idea of an NWA World Heavyweight Championship match, which Abyss agreed to, creating a partnership between the two. With Mitchell as Abyss' new manager, Abyss attacked Raven later during the show, setting up a match between the two at the PPV. Raven challenged Abyss to a Dog Collar match with "No Surrender" rules in which the only way to win was by pinfall at No Surrender on the July 1 episode of Impact!, which was accepted. During the July 15 episode of Impact!, Cassidy Reilly pledged his allegiance to Raven for past experiences in which Raven had saved him, going on to state he would be there to help Raven anytime he needed it.

The TNA X Division Championship was defended in another high profiled match on the card. Then-champion Christopher Daniels was pitted against Petey Williams in the contest. On the July 1 episode of Impact!, Terry Taylor held an interview with Daniels. During this time, Daniels announced he had defeated the best Mexican Luchador in Shocker and the best American wrestlers in Chris Sabin and Michael Shane to retain the X Division Championship. At this time, Canadian wrestler Petey Williams entered and challenged Daniels to a title defense at No Surrender, which Daniels accepted.

A.J. Styles challenged Sean Waltman with Jerry Lynn as the Special Guest Referee in another encounter promoted for No Surrender. At TNA's previous PPV event Slammiversary on June 19, then-champion Styles defended the NWA World Heavyweight Championship in a King of the Mountain match against Abyss, Monty Brown, Raven, and Waltman. Waltman and Styles created an alliance during the match, which ended when Waltman turned on Styles, costing him the championship as Raven went on to win the match. Styles and Waltman had a confrontation on the July 1 episode of Impact!, which was stopped by Lynn. Styles asked for a match against Waltman from NWA Championship Committee member Larry Zbyszko on the July 8 episode of Impact!. Zbyszko granted Styles his request only after making Lynn the Special Guest Referee.

A Tag Team Street Fight pitting the 3 Live Kru (Konnan and Ron Killings) against the team of Monty Brown and The Outlaw was promoted for the undercard. On the June 24 episode of Impact!, Brown and The Outlaw attacked Konnan and Killings during an interview with TNA commentator Mike Tenay. Brown and The Outlaw proceeded to parody Konnan, Killings, and 3Live Kru member B.G. James leading up to No Surrender. Following a fight between Konnan, Killings, Brown, and The Outlaw on the July 15 episode of Impact!, Tenay announced the two teams were scheduled for a Street Fight at No Surrender.

== Event ==
Other on-screen personnel
Role:	Name:
Commentator	Mike Tenay
Commentator	Don West
Ring announcer	Jeremy Borash
Referee	Rudy Charles
Referee	Mark "Slick" Johnson
Referee	Andrew Thomas
Interviewers	Jeremy Borash
Interviewers	Shane Douglas

=== Pre-Show ===
TNA held a thirty-minute pre-show prior to the event, during which Shocker was pitted against Jerrelle Clark. Shocker won the bout at 4 minutes and 16 seconds with a roll-up pin.

=== Miscellaneous ===
No Surrender featured employees other than the wrestlers involved in the matches. Mike Tenay and Don West were the commentators for the telecast. Jeremy Borash, for main event only, and David Penzer were ring announcers for the event. Andrew Thomas, Rudy Charles, and Mark "Slick" Johnson participated as referees for the encounters. Shane Douglas handled the interview duties for the event. Besides employees who appeared in a wrestling role, Jeff Jarrett, Jimmy Hart, Traci, James Mitchell, and Rhino all appeared on camera, either in backstage or in ringside segments.

=== Preliminary matches ===
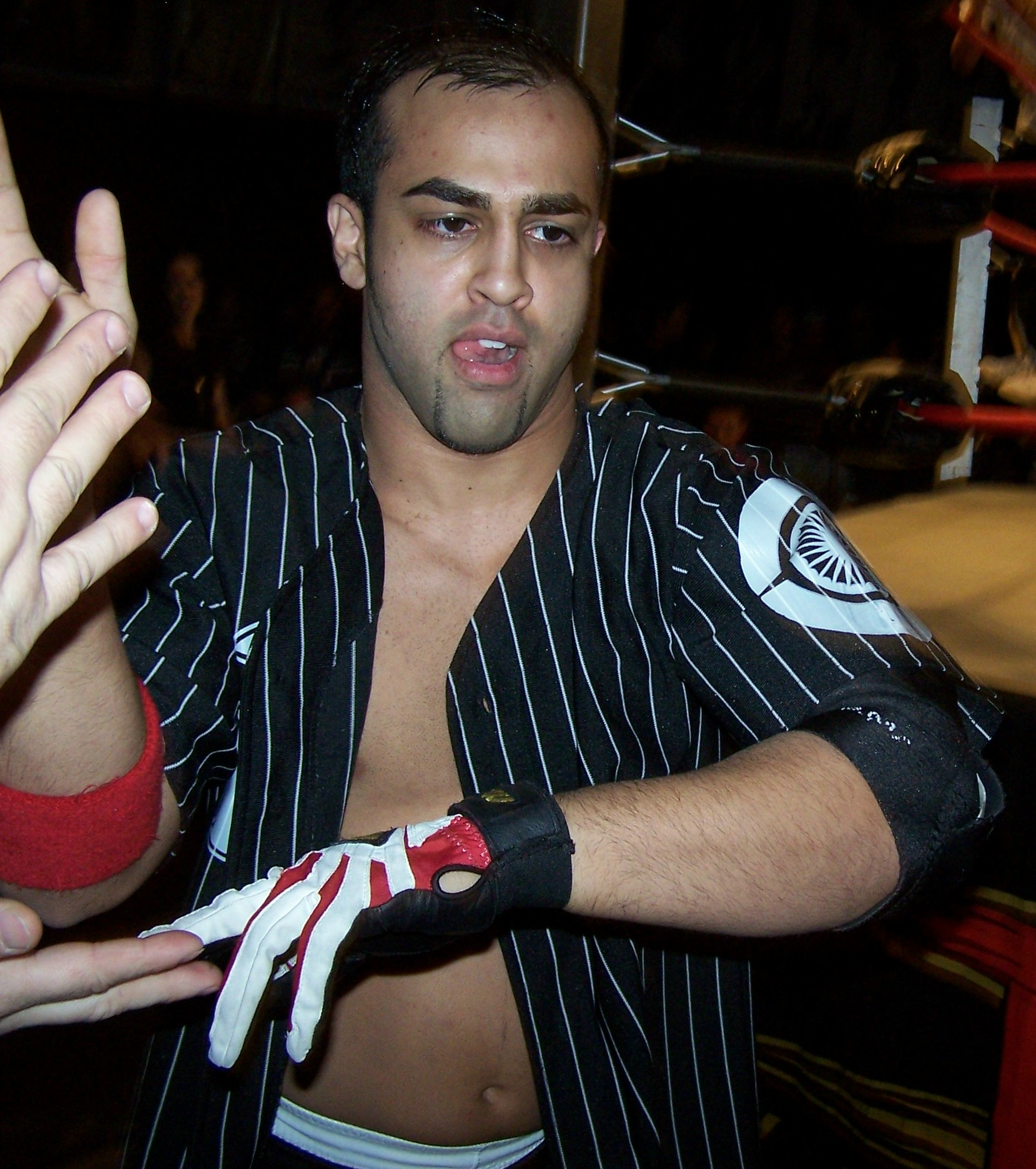
Sonjay Dutt (pictured) won a X Division Four Way match to qualify for the 2005 TNA Super X Cup Tournament.

The event opened with a tag team match between America's Most Wanted (Chris Harris and James Storm; AMW) and the team of Alex Shelley and Michael Shane, who were accompanied by Traci. The duration of the bout was 11 minutes and 47 seconds. At one point, Storm lifted up Shane, so Harris could dive off the top rope and bash him in the chest with his forearm. Later, Storm was thrown out of the ring but held on to the top rope. He attempted to pull himself back in, however, Shelley dropkicked him from inside the ring, knocking him to the outside. AMW won the match after Storm pinned Shelley following a kick to the chin.

TNA held a X Division Four Way match for the last spot in the 2005 TNA Super X Cup Tournament between Elix Skipper, Mikey Batts, Shark Boy, and Sonjay Dutt. The competition lasted 8 minutes and 22 seconds. Elix Skipper performed his signature maneuver the Sudden Death on Batts near the end. He attempted a cover but was stopped by Shark Boy. Shark Boy then went for a cover, who was stopped by Dutt. Dutt then performed his signature aerial maneuver the Hindu Press, landing on Batts to gain the victory and enter the 2005 TNA Super X Cup Tournament.

David Young and Simon Diamond fought Apolo and Sonny Siaki in the third encounter. It lasted 5 minutes and 32 seconds. Close to the end, Davidlifted up and slammed Siaki back-first into the mat with a Spinebuster. The referee refused to count the pin, deeming that David was not the eligible man. This allowed Apolo to lift up and slam David face-first into the mat to win the match.

In the fourth match, Samoa Joe was pitted against Chris Sabin. Joe performed his signature Muscle Buster maneuver and then placed Sabin in his signature submission hold the Coquina Clutch. Instead of submitting, Sabin instead passed out in storyline, with the referee lifting and raising his arm three times before giving the victory to Joe at 14 minutes and 2 seconds.

A Six Man Tag Team match between Team Canada (A-1, Bobby Roode, and Eric Young) and the team of Lance Hoyt and The Naturals (Andy Douglas and Chase Stevens), who were accompanied by Jimmy Hart, was next. The match duration was 14 minutes and 44 seconds. Douglas scored a near-fall after Hoyt slammed Eric back-first to the mat. The Naturals set up for their Natural Disaster tag team maneuver on Eric, however, Roode entered and bashed Douglas and Stevens with a megaphone. Eric then covered Douglas for the win.

=== Main event matches ===
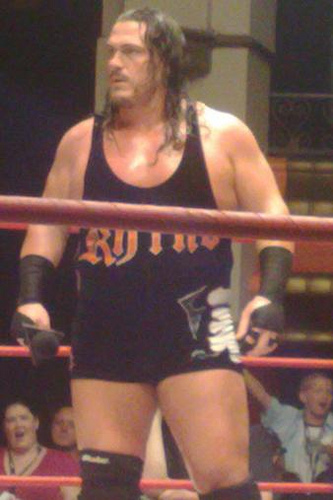
Rhino made his TNA debut at No Surrender attacking Raven.

The sixth contest was a Tag Team Street Fight pitting the team of Monty Brown and The Outlaw against the 3Live Kru (Konnan and Ron Killings). A Street Fight is fought under no disqualification rules, which is won either by a pinfall or submission. The Outlaw requested to be called by a new name before the contest, Kip James. The Outlaw was busted open during the bout. Multiple referees had to be replaced for the match, due to reoccurring attacks on them by The Outlaw. Brown won the encounter after performing his signature Pounce maneuver on Killings, knocking him across the ring onto the mat, at 5 minutes and 20 seconds. After the contest, B.G. James entered the ring where The Outlaw offered James a chair to hit Konnan with, which James declined.

Jerry Lynn was Special Guest Referee for the next encounter between A.J. Styles and Sean Waltman. Styles bleed from the nose during the match. Styles gained a near-fall on Waltman after performing his signature Styles Clash maneuver and slamming Waltman face-first into the mat. Waltman also gained a near-fall following his signature X-Factor maneuver and forcing Styles face-first into the mat. Later, Styles jumped from the ring apron over the top rope and Waltman in a sunset flip. Waltman held onto the ropes, trying to prevent a pin attempt, until Lynn kicked his hands off the top rope. Styles then rolled through and lifted Waltman up to perform the Styles Clash at 14 minutes and 37 seconds to win the competition.

The TNA X Division Championship was defended by Christopher Daniels against Petey Williams, who was accompanied by A-1. The duration was 16 minutes and 24 seconds. During the match, Williams put Daniels in his Sharpshooter submission hold, which Williams was forced to release when Daniels grabbed the bottom rope. A-1 tossed Williams a chain to bash Daniels with. However, Daniels had his own chain which he used to punch Williams with and followed by performing his signature Best Moonsault Ever maneuver, splashing onto Williams, to retain the championship.

The main event was a No Surrender Dog Collar match for the NWA World Heavyweight Championship between then-champion Raven and the challenger Abyss, who was accompanied by James Mitchell. The encounter lasted 19 minutes and 17 seconds. In a Dog Collar match, both competitors are tied together at the neck by a long steel chain that is attached to a dog collar. The match is fought under no disqualification rules; in this case the only way to win was by pinfall. Abyss crashed through a table at ringside after Raven pushed him off the stage. Abyss removed the collar during the match and retrieved a bag of thumbtacks. He then poured them over the mat and ripped Raven's shirt off, before attempting to slam him into them. Cassidy Reilly interfered in the contest stopping Abyss. Later, Cassidy was shoved off the ring apron by Abyss and he crashed through a table. Raven followed by slamming Abyss back-first into the tacks with a powerbomb and covered for a near-fall. Abyss also gained a near-fall on Raven after slamming him into the mat back-first with his signature Black Hole Slam maneuver. Raven finally won the contest following forcing Abyss head-first into thumbtacks with his signature Raven Effect DDT maneuver to retain the championship. Following the bout, a segment took place between Raven and Jeff Jarrett, which ended when Rhino made his TNA debut and tackled Raven with his signature Gore maneuver.

== Reception ==
A total of 775 people attended No Surrender. Canadian Online Explorer writer Jason Clevett rated the entire event an 8 out of 10, which was equal with the 8 of 10 given to the 2006 No Surrender by Clevett. No Surrender's rating was higher than TNA's previous event Slammiversary, which was given a 7 out of 10 by Clevett. Compared to rival World Wrestling Entertainment's The Great American Bash PPV event held on July 24, No Surrender was rated higher, as Bob Kapur gave The Great American Bash a 5 out of 10. Clevett felt that No Surrender proved that "when everything clicks they [TNA] can put on a fantastic show that gives fans their money's worth." A.J. Styles versus Sean Waltman, Samoa Joe versus Chris Sabin, and the X Division Championship match were signaled out by Clevett as three "fantastic matches on a solid undercard." Clevett gave his highest match rating of 9 out of 10 in his review to the Joe versus Sabin bout. He gave his lowest rating of 3 out of 10 to the Tag Team Street Fight. The main event, Styles versus Waltman, and the X Division Championship matches were all given an 8 out of 10 by Clevett. Regarding the Dog Collar match, Clevett thought it was a "bloody and violent encounter, as one would expect with those two in the ring." When commenting on the Styles versus Waltman encounter, Clevett thought it "was undoubtable Waltman's best match in years".

Wade Keller of the Pro Wrestling Torch rated the main event, Styles versus Waltman, and Joe versus Sabin all 3 and a half stars out of 5. However, the X Division Championship match received a 3 and a three-fourths stars out of 5, his highest rating of the review. He gave the lowest ranking to the Tag Team Street Fight, at a half of a star. Keller commented on the main event as being "what you'd expect, and that's not a bad thing". Keller thought the Styles versus Waltman bout was a "very good match, the best from Waltman in years". James Caldwell, also of the Pro Wrestling Torch, published a review of the show. In his review he stated that the main event was a "good car wreck match", which "told a good story based on the storyline entering the match". Regarding the X Division Championship bout, Caldwell thought that "both men worked a solid match". "A good wrestling match that showed Waltman still has it.", said Caldwell as he commented on the Styles versus Waltman encounter. Caldwell believed that Joe versus Sabin was a "damn good match". TNA released a DVD counting down the top 50 moments in their history in 2007, with Rhino's debut listed at number 36.

== Aftermath ==
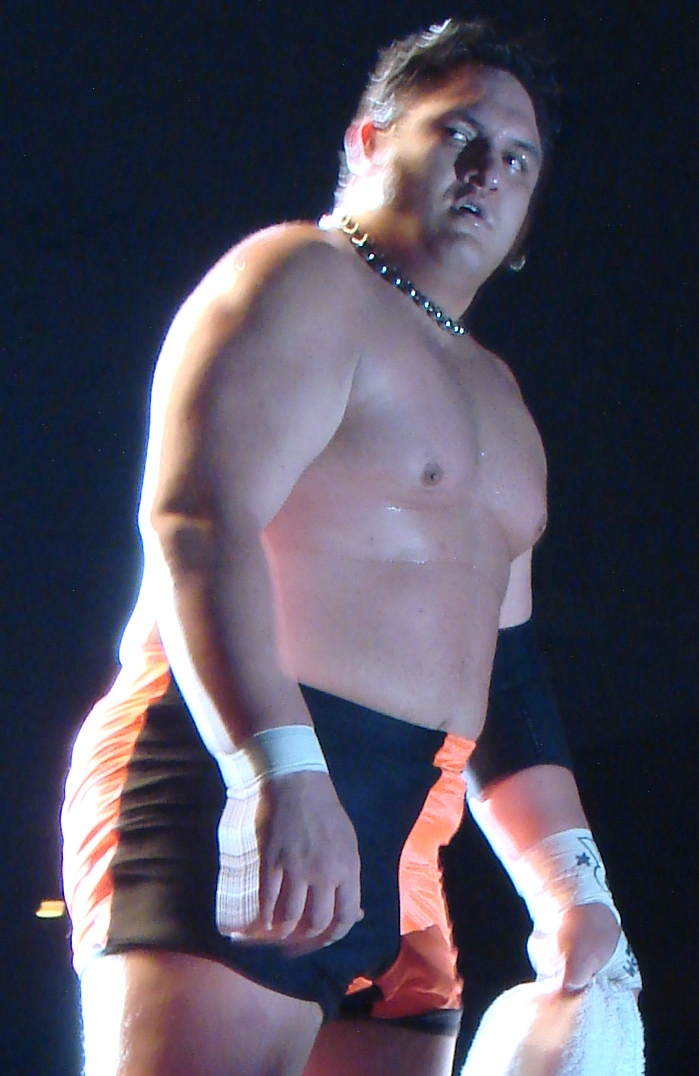
Samoa Joe (pictured) defeated A.J. Styles in the Finals of the 2005 TNA Super X Cup Tournament at Sacrifice to win the Tournament.

Following No Surrender, Raven went on to feud with Jeff Jarrett and Rhino. Jarrett and Rhino attacked Raven on the July 22 episode of Impact!, claiming he had no allies to help him. On the July 29 episode of Impact!, Jarrett and Rhino attacked Cassidy Riley as well, until Raven announced he had chosen a partner to team with him in a Tag Team match to face Jarrett and Rhino at TNA's next PPV event Sacrifice on August 14. Sabu then appeared attacking Jarrett and Rhino with Raven. At Sacrifice, NWA Championship Committee member Larry Zbyszko added a stipulation to the encounter, in which if Jarrett pinned Raven he would earn a future NWA World Heavyweight Championship match, however, if Raven pinned Jarrett then he would not garner one for an entire year. The team of Jarrett and Rhino won the contest at the event, with Rhino gaining the pinfall victory.

Abyss began a feud with Lance Hoyt after No Surrender, when Abyss attacked Hoyt on the July 22 episode of Impact!. In return Hoyt attacked Abyss on the August 5 episode of Impact!, setting up a match between the two at Sacrifice. Abyss won the match at the event.

TNA held the 2005 TNA Super X Cup Tournament in the weeks following No Surrender leading up to Sacrifice. It was a single-elimination tournament which involved eight men, A.J. Styles, Alex Shelley, Chris Sabin, Michael Shane, Petey Williams, Samoa Joe, Shocker, and Sonjay Dutt. The winner of the tournament would become number one contender to the TNA X Division Championship held by Christopher Daniels. Daniels provided commentary to each of the encounters on the July 22, July 29, August 5, and August 10 episodes of Impact!, as well as the Finals at Sacrifice. Daniels unofficially named the tournament the Christopher Daniels Invitational. The tournament came down to Joe and Styles in the Finals at Sacrifice, which Joe won after interference from Daniels.

Sean Waltman and Jerry Lynn sparked a rivalry after No Surrender due to Lynn's interference in Waltman's bout against Styles, with the two facing at Sacrifice. The storyline revolving around this match began on the July 22 episode of Impact!, where Waltman accused Lynn of trying to steal his spotlight in a backstage segment, while Lynn took credit for Waltman's success in the industry for helping Waltman get his start. Lynn defeated Waltman at the event.

The 3Live Kru (Konnan and Ron Killings) and the team of Monty Brown and The Outlaw fought at Sacrifice, this time with B.G. James as Special Guest Referee. Due to The Outlaw attacking several referees during the Street Fight at No Surrender, TNA officials refused to referee a rematch between the two teams at Sacrifice. As such, this forced Zbyszko to name B.G. as the Special Guest Referee on the July 29 episode of Impact!. The 3Live Kru were the victors at Sacrifice.

== Results ==
No.	Results	Stipulations	Times
1^{P}	Shocker defeated Jerrelle Clark	Singles match	4:16
2	America's Most Wanted (Chris Harris and James Storm) defeated Alex Shelley and Michael Shane (with Traci)	Tag team match	11:47
3	Sonjay Dutt defeated Elix Skipper, Mikey Batts and Shark Boy	X Division Four-way match to qualify for the 2005 TNA Super X Cup Tournament	8:22
4	Apolo and Sonny Siaki defeated David Young and Simon Diamond	Tag team match	5:32
5	Samoa Joe defeated Chris Sabin by technical submission	Singles match	14:02
6	Team Canada (A-1, Bobby Roode and Eric Young) defeated The Naturals (Andy Douglas and Chase Stevens) and Lance Hoyt (with Jimmy Hart)	Six-man tag team match	14:44
7	Monty Brown and Kip James defeated 3 Live Kru (Konnan and Ron Killings)	Street Fight	5:20
8	A.J. Styles defeated Sean Waltman	Singles match with Jerry Lynn as special guest referee	14:37
9	Christopher Daniels (c) defeated Petey Williams	Singles match for the TNA X Division Championship	16:24
10	Raven (c) defeated Abyss (with James Mitchell)	Dog Collar match for the NWA World Heavyweight Championship	19:17
(c) / – the champion(s) heading into the match; P / – the match was broadcast on the pre-show

== See also ==
- 2005 in professional wrestling
