= Team USA (professional wrestling) =

Professional wrestling stable

Stable
- Members: See below

Team USA (also known as Team NWA or Team TNA) is a wrestling faction brought together as part of Total Nonstop Action Wrestling's X-Cup Tournaments, which involved a team of X Division contestants from various countries representing their nation in an international wrestling competition.

== History ==
=== 2004 ===
==== America's X-Cup ====
Team USA was created and led Jerry Lynn after he was appointed by TNA Management as the man for the job due to being a pioneer of the X Division. The other teams in the X-Cup Tournaments were Team Mexico or Team AAA, Team Britain, Team Canada, and Team Japan or Team AJPW.

Team USA did not have a very good showing early on, as they lost the inaugural America's X-Cup Tournament to Team Mexico (consisting of Juventud Guerrera, Hector Garza, Mr. Águila, and Abismo Negro).

==== Frankie Kazarian ====
They were also embroiled in a feud with Frankie Kazarian, who believed he was wrongfully overlooked by Lynn with regards to the selection of the team. Kazarian proceeded to make his point by attacking and defeating members of Team USA in an attempt to get Lynn's attention. Sonjay Dutt eventually left the team to pursue a grudge with Kazarian regarding this situation. Kazarian defeated Dutt and demanded the now-open spot on the team.

TNA responded by putting him in a match with Christopher Daniels for the open spot. Daniels won the match and joined Team USA.

==== World X-Cup ====
With Daniels on Team USA, the team enjoyed instant success, winning an 8-man tag warm-up for the World X-Cup. Their momentum carried into the World X-Cup, where Team USA emerged victorious.

=== 2006 ===
==== Team Formation ====
Team USA would return to TNA Wrestling to take part in the 2006 World X-Cup. The team's members were chosen through qualifying matches held during episodes of TNA Impact!.

Jay Lethal was the first to qualify for the team, defeating Shannon Moore and Roderick Strong in a triple threat match. Chris Sabin was the second to qualify, defeating Alex Shelley and Sonjay Dutt for the role. Sonjay Dutt, who defeated Matt Bentley and Elix Skipper, was the third to qualify. Finally, Alex Shelley would qualify by defeating Roderick Strong and Chase Stevens.

At a later time, former Team USA captain Jerry Lynn was given the authority of coach/mentor for the team. Despite never coming to the ring with the team during the competitions, he advised them backstage and appointed former teammate Chris Sabin as the team captain for 2006.

==== World X-Cup Run ====
Team USA jumped ahead early in the World X-Cup, with Alex Shelley and Sonjay Dutt defeating Minoru Tanaka and Hirooki Goto of Team Japan on TNA Impact! to earn Team USA 2 points. Chris Sabin then defeated Puma of Team Mexico to earn Team USA another 3 points. After not scoring any points in the Gauntlet for the Gold match at Sacrifice, the team found themselves tied for first place with Team Canada after Petey Williams pinned Puma to win the Gauntlet.

Director of Authority Larry Zbyszko announced a sudden death tiebreaker between the captains of the two teams for the following episode of TNA Impact to determine the winner of the World X-Cup. Just before the match started, both respective teams were locked out of the Impact Zone. Chris Sabin defeated Petey Williams with the Cradle Shock to win the match at the tournament for Team USA.

==== Shelley/Nash Controversies ====
The inclusion of Shelley on the team created controversy for Team USA, as the team was mostly full of babyface wrestlers, while Shelley was a heel working for Jeff Jarrett's Planet Jarrett faction. Problems with Shelley led to initial losses in exhibition matches featuring Team USA taking on Team Canada and Team Japan, but Shelley turned things around and became a productive member of Team USA, aiding their efforts.

Shelley later got involved with a second controversy that started during the World X-Cup. He was invited by Kevin Nash to conduct an interview with the big man. During the interview, Nash criticized TNA and threatened to destroy the X Division. Shelley showed the tape to Team USA, who took serious offense.

Nash appeared after the Gauntlet match at Sacrifice, beating down Puma after he had lost the match and delivering a Jackknife Powerbomb to the Team Mexico competitor. Nash also appeared the following week on TNA Impact, attacking Chris Sabin after he won the trophy. Nash broke the trophy and used parts of it to gouge Sabin, then delivered a Jackknife Powerbomb to him as well. Jerry Lynn and Team USA eventually was allowed back into the arena and made the save, but Shelley mysteriously departed with Nash.

==== Post X-Cup ====
After the 2006 World X-Cup, Alex Shelley formed the Paparazzi Productions along with Kevin Nash and they developed a short feud with USA 2006 Team Captain, Chris Sabin. Since then, Sabin is now teaming with Alex Shelley as the Motor City Machine Guns. Meanwhile, Sonjay Dutt and Jay Lethal are an on-again-off-again tag-team. Lethal is now known as "Black Machismo" and his character is based on that of "The Macho Man" Randy Savage. Dutt, on the other hand, is currently playing a character that is based on Gandhi.

=== 2008 ===
Mexico won the World X Cup 2008.

=== 2013 ===
Team USA won the World Cup of Wrestling in a tiebreaker match against Team Aces & Eights.

=== 2016 ===
EC3, Tyrus and Eli Drake represented Team TNA in the 2016 Lucha Libre World Cup, but was eliminated in the first round.

== Members ==
=== 2004 ===
- (United States) Jerry Lynn (Captain)
- (United States) Chris Sabin
- (United States) Elix Skipper
- (United States) Sonjay Dutt (Left the team to pursue a feud with Frankie Kazarian)
- (United States) Christopher Daniels (Replaced Dutt)

=== 2006 ===
- (United States) Chris Sabin (Captain)
- (United States) Jay Lethal
- (United States) Sonjay Dutt
- (United States) Alex Shelley

=== 2008 ===
- (United States) Kaz (Captain)
- (United States) Chris Sabin
- (United States) Alex Shelley
- (Japan) Curry Man

=== 2013 ===
- (United States) James Storm (Captain)
- (United States) Christopher Daniels
- (United States) Kazarian
- (United States) Kenny King
- (United States) Mickie James

=== 2016 ===
- (United States) EC3
- (United States) Eli Drake
- (United States) Tyrus

== Competitive record ==
=== World X Cup record ===
Competition	Notes	Position	Points	Captain
2004 America's X Cup		2nd	N/A	Jerry Lynn
2004 World X Cup		1st	7	Jerry Lynn
2006 World X Cup		1st	6	Chris Sabin
2008 World X Cup		2nd	7	Kaz
2013 World Cup of Wrestling		1st	4	James Storm

== Championships and accomplishments ==
- Total Nonstop Action Wrestling
  - TNA World X Cup (2004) – with (Jerry Lynn, Chris Sabin, Elix Skipper and Christopher Daniels)
  - TNA World X Cup (2006) – with (Chris Sabin, Jay Lethal, Sonjay Dutt and Alex Shelley)
  - TNA World Cup of Wrestling (2013) – with (James Storm, Christopher Daniels, Kazarian, Kenny King, and Mickie James)
