= 2008 TNA World X Cup Tournament =

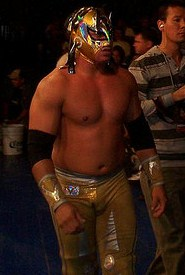
- Volador Jr., who won the final round to win the tournament for Team Mexico
- Venue: TNA Impact! Zone and Reliant Arena
- Location: Orlando, Florida and Houston, Texas
- Start date: June 10, 2008
- End date: July 13, 2008
- Competitors: Team Mexico; Team TNA (USA); Team Japan; Team International

Champion
- Team Mexico

The 2008 TNA World X Cup Tournament was a professional wrestling X Cup Tournament produced by the Total Nonstop Action Wrestling (TNA) promotion. It was the third World X Cup Tournament and the last held as of 2026. The competition began on June 10, 2008 and concluded on July 13, 2008 at TNA's Victory Road pay-per-view (PPV) event.

The tournament featured several international X Division wrestlers alongside several TNA X Division wrestlers. The theme of the contest was four competing teams, each representing a specific country or organization. However, the 2008 competition featured the debut of Team International, which represented several countries and cultures. Daivari, Tyson Dux, Doug Williams, Alex Koslov, Averno, Rey Bucanero, Último Guerrero, Volador Jr., Naruki Doi, Masato Yoshino, Puma, Milano Collection A.T., Kaz, Alex Shelley, Chris Sabin, and Curry Man all competed in the 2008 installment. They formed the four teams involved: Team International, Team Mexico, Team Japan, and Team TNA. The contest consisted of four rounds, made up of eight matches each, with the third round and finals held at Victory Road. Several of the wrestlers who competed in the tournament went on to make regular appearances in TNA after the conclusion of the contest. Team Mexico won the tournament by having scored the most points, with seven, compared to TNA with six, Japan with four, and International with three.

Bob Kapur, of the professional wrestling section of the Canadian Online Explorer, reviewed Victory Road, giving the third round a 9 out of 10, while the final round received an 8 out of 10. Kapur said the third round was an "incredible match", while the final was "excellent with some tremendous crazy spots". Wade Keller of the Pro Wrestling Torch Newsletter reviewed the matches involved in the tournament. Keller said the third round bout was a dream match for some, with "lots of cool spots from start to finish", but that it had "little context early" and was more just a "bunch of spots". As for the final round, Keller commented that "it had some spectacular (and ridiculously dangerous looking) spots", but that it ended up "feeling short for a match of that caliber".

== Production ==
The 2008 installment of the TNA World X Cup Tournament was announced in February 2008 by TNA Management Director Jim Cornette. Cornette did not reveal when the tournament would be held or who would be involved. On the May 1 episode of TNA's television program TNA Impact!, TNA commentator Mike Tenay announced that the tournament was planned for the summer. In mid-May, it was reported that New Japan Pro-Wrestling was sending Milano Collection A.T. and Taichi Ishikari to be featured in the tournament. TNA was also interested in bringing in British wrestler Doug Williams. Averno, Rey Bucanero, Último Guerrero, Volador Jr., Naruki Doi, and Masato Yoshino were revealed at the end of May to be involved. In June, the Wrestling Observer Newsletter reported that Daivari, Tyson Dux, Williams, and Alex Koslov would make up Team International, while Averno, Bucanero, Guerrero, and Volador Jr. would be Team Mexico, and Team Japan would consist of Milano Collection AT, Ishikari, Doi, and Yoshino. The finals of the tournament were also planned to be held at TNA's Victory Road pay-per-view (PPV) event on July 13. It was announced on the June 19 episode of Impact! that the finals would be contested in an Ultimate X match. Team Mexico had trouble entering the United States, resulting in the tournament starting without them and the team appearing late in the festivities. Team TNA was revealed on the June 12 episode of Impact!, with Kaz as the team captain and Alex Shelley, Chris Sabin, and Curry Man rounding out the team. Despite the report by the Wrestling Observer Newsletter, Ishikari did not compete in the tournament; instead, Puma filled out Team Japan.

Before the tournament commenced, TNA held three preview matches involving World X Cup participants. The first two were featured on the June 12 episode of Impact!. In the first preview match, Team TNA's The Motor City Machine Guns (Alex Shelley and Chris Sabin) were pitted against Team Japan's Speed Muscle (Masato Yoshino and Naruki Doi) in a tag team match lasting 6 minutes. The Motor City Machine Guns won when Sabin pinned Doi, after Shelley and Sabin performed a double kick to the face. The second was between Team International's Alex Koslov and Team TNA's Curry Man, which lasted 4 minutes. Koslov won the match by pinfall after a splash from the top rope. TNA held another preview match on the June 19 episode of Impact!. In this match, Kaz of Team TNA defeated Koslov after smashing Koslov face-first into the mat with his signature Wave of the Future maneuver.

== Competitors ==
Team TNA	Team Mexico	Team Japan	Team International
Kaz (Captain)	Último Guerrero (Captain)	Milano Collection A.T. (Captain)	Daivari (Captain)
Alex Shelley	Averno	Masato Yoshino	Alex Koslov
Chris Sabin	Rey Bucanero	Naruki Doi	Doug Williams
Curry Man	Volador Jr.	Puma	Tyson Dux

== Tournament ==
The 2008 TNA World X Cup Tournament featured eight matches that involved different wrestlers from pre-existing scripted feuds, and storylines. Wrestlers portrayed villains, heroes, or less distinguishable characters in the scripted events that built tension and culminated in a wrestling match or series of matches.

The tournament consisted of four rounds, with the first two rounds taking place on Impact!, while round three and four were held at Victory Road. Round one was taped on June 10 and June 23, and aired on the June 19 and June 26 episodes of Impact!. Round two was taped on June 24, and aired on the July 3 and July 10 episodes of Impact!.

Curry Man (pictured) competed in the 2008 TNA World X Cup Tournament.

Round One

Round one of the 2008 TNA World X Cup Tournament was strictly Tag Team matches between each of the participating groups, with each victory being worth one point. Two matches were held during round one. The first match was between Team TNA and Team International on the June 19 episode of Impact!. The Motor City Machine Guns represented Team TNA in the contest, while the team of Tyson Dux and Daivari fought for Team International. The Motor City Machine Guns won the encounter by pinfall at 13 minutes when Shelley forced Daivari head-first into the mat with his signature Sliced Bread#2 maneuver.

The next match pitted Team Mexico against Team Japan on the June 26 episode of Impact!. The team of Rey Bucanero and Último Guerrero represented Team Mexico in the contest, while Speed Muscle represented Team Japan. Team Mexico won the bout after Bucanero and Guerrero each performed a corkscrew aerial splash on Doi to gain the pinfall victory at 6 minutes. At the end of round one, this left Team International and Team Japan with zero points, while Team TNA and Team Mexico both had one point a piece.

Round Two

The format for round two changed from Tag Team matches to Standard wrestling matches, with each victory now worth two points. Four matches were held during round two. The first bout pitted Team Mexico against Team International. Rey Bucanero of Team Mexico faced Alex Koslov of Team International, which Bucanero won at 2 minutes after a somersault dive from the top rope. The next bout was between Team Japan and Team TNA. Milano Collection A.T. of Team Japan defeated Curry Man of Team TNA in the match. He won by pinfall at 4 minutes after a backflip splash from the top rope. Both of these contests were featured on the July 3 episode of Impact!

The final two matches of round two took place on the July 10 episode of Impact!. The first was between Team International and Team Japan. In this contest, Doug Williams of Team International defeated Masato Yoshino by pinfall after slamming Yoshino neck-first onto the mat with his signature Chaos Theory maneuver at the 5 minute mark. In the final match of round two, Team TNA faced Team Mexico. Team TNA's Kaz defeated Team Mexico's Ultimo Guerrero in 5 minutes. Kaz won the bout by pinfall after slamming Guerrero face-first onto the mat with his signature Wave of the Future maneuver. At the end of round two, the point standings for the teams were Team Mexico with three points, Team TNA with three, Team Japan with two, and Team International with two.

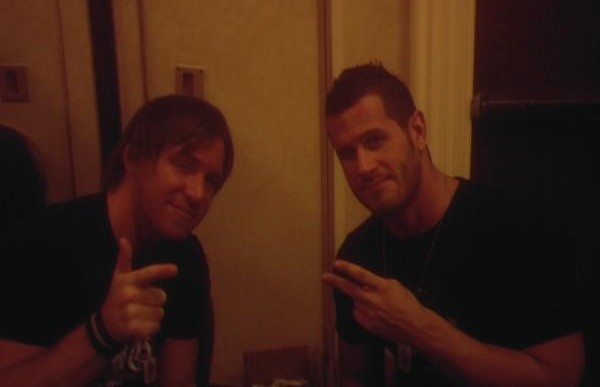
Chris Sabin (left) and Alex Shelley (right) both represented Team TNA in the 2008 TNA World X Cup Tournament.

Round Three

The third round of the 2008 TNA World X Cup Tournament opened Victory Road on July 13. It was a X Division Four Team Twelve Man Elimination Tag Team match between Alex Shelley, Chris Sabin, and Curry Man of Team TNA, Masato Yoshino, Milano Collection A.T., and Puma of Team Japan, Averno, Rey Bucanero, and Último Guerrero of Team Mexico, and Alex Koslov, Doug Williams, and Tyson Dux of Team International. The bout lasted 24 minutes and 16 seconds. The rules of this encounter involved only two wrestlers in the ring at all times, with any member of any team being allowed to tag in at any time. Members of each team were eliminated until only one team remained, that team was considered the winner and earned three points in the World X Cup Tournament. The first person eliminated was Dux at 2 minutes and 55 seconds by Bucanero. Puma then followed at 5 minutes and 4 seconds by Averno. Milano Collection A.T. was eliminated by Sabin at 7 minutes and 2 seconds, leaving Team Japan down to one member. At 10 minutes and 27 seconds, Yoshino pinned Averno. At this time, Team TNA was the only team to not lose a member, until Guerrero pinned Curry Man to drop Team TNA down to two members in the bout at 12 minutes and 51 seconds. Bucanero eliminated another competitor at 13 minutes and 23 seconds by pinning Williams, which left Team International one member. Team Mexico was then eliminated from the encounter after Guerrero was pinned by Koslov at 15 minutes and 9 seconds, along with Bucanero being pinned by Sabin at 16 minutes and 12 seconds. Koslov followed up by eliminating Sabin at 19 minutes and 6 seconds, leaving Team TNA, Team International, and Team Japan one member a piece. Team International was eliminated afterwards at 20 minutes and 34 seconds by Yoshino. The match came down to Shelley of Team TNA and Yoshino of Team Japan. Shelley won the bout by pinning Yoshino after forcing Yoshino back-first onto the mat with his signature Automatic Midnight maneuver to win the contest and three points for Team TNA at 24 minutes and 16 seconds.

With the win by Shelley of Team TNA, the point standings for the teams were Team TNA with six, Team Mexico with three, Team Japan with two, and Team International with two going into the final round. However, TNA stated that Team International and Team Japan also gained points in the match for eliminating competitors, so by TNA statistics the point values were Team TNA with six, Team Mexico with three, Team Japan with four, and Team International with three heading into the final round.

Round Four

The fourth and final round of the 2008 TNA World X Cup Tournament was held later on the card of Victory Road. It involved one member of each respective team in a Four Way Ultimate X match. The encounter was between Daivari of Team International, Kaz of Team TNA, Naruki Doi of Team Japan, and Volador Jr. of Team Mexico. In an Ultimate X match, two steel cables are attached to four steel supports in such a way that they form an "X" above the ring. At the center of this "X" an item is hung, which must be retrieved by a participant to win the match. In this bout, the item hanging above the ring was an enlarged red "X" which symbolized four points in the World X Cup Tournament. During the encounter, Kaz ascended one of the steel supports before jumping off towards the center of the ring and slamming his leg onto Daivari, who was holding onto the cables. This action forced both of them to fall and crash onto the ring mat below. Afterwards, Volador Jr ascended the cables and retrieved the "X" to win the match and four points for Team Mexico at 10 minutes and 58 seconds. Team Mexico were awarded a trophy for their victory after the bout by Mike Tenay and TNA Spanish commentator Willie Urbina.

With this victory, Team Mexico won the 2008 TNA World X Cup Tournament with seven points, compared to six by Team TNA, four by Team Japan, and three by Team International.

== Reception ==
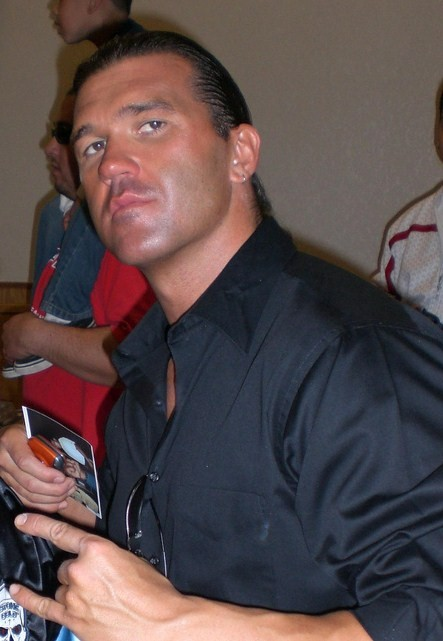
Kazarian (pictured) was the captain of Team TNA and competed in the final round of the 2008 TNA World X Cup Tournament.

Wade Keller and James Caldwell of the Pro Wrestling Torch Newsletter each reviewed the matches involved in the tournament. Caldwell said the first round match between The Motor City Machine Guns and the team of Tyson Dux and Daivari was a "high-energy affair with a fast-paced sequence to finish the match." He also said it was "very heavy on forgettable spots", but that it was "the type of in-ring action expected by viewers of this show." He rated it on a scale of 5 stars, giving it 2 1/4 stars. Caldwell reviewed the Team Mexico versus Team Japan contest from round one. He called it "very much a lucha-style match with fast-paced action and plenty of tag team double-teaming" that was a "good X Cup showcase,' which he gave 1 1/2 stars.

For round two, Caldwell reviewed the World X Cup matches from the July 3 episode of Impact!, while Keller reviewed the bouts from the July 10 broadcast. Caldwell gave the Rey Bucanero versus Alex Koslov bout a 1/2 star rating and said it was "disappointingly short" and that TNA must have given it less time in order to "squeeze in 18 more Kurt Angle skits." The encounter between Milano Collection A.T. and Curry Man was also given a 1/2 star rating with Caldwell commenting that "from a viewer's perspective" it was "too short" and that TNA did not give "enough background on Milano" for the viewers "to care about this." Keller gave the contest between Doug Williams and Masato Yoshino a 1 star rating and quipped that the "win gave Team International 2 points, so that meant that in the standings for those who care... wait. Nobody cares? Okay. Never mind, then." As for the contest pitting Kaz against Último Guerrero, Keller said it was "decent action" and gave it 3/4 of a star.

Regarding the third round, Keller said the bout was a dream match for some with "lots of cool spots from start to finish", but that it had "little context early" and was more just a "bunch of spots." He also said that the "last ten minutes was better without as many people tagging in and out somewhat indiscriminately." As for the final round, Keller commented that "it had some spectacular (and ridiculously dangerous looking) spots", but that it ended up "feeling short for a match of that caliber." Caldwell stated that the third round bout was "entertaining yet quite long" and that the "crowd was super into Sabin and Shelley." He also said that after the match settled into "one-on-one action" it "turned into a pretty good match." The final round was seen by Caldwell as "one of those rinse and repeat spot fest matches until Kaz busted out the big double foot stomp on Daivari that popped the crowd." Overall, he called it a "one spot match."

Chris Sokol, Bryan Sokol, and John Waldman all of the professional wrestling section of the Canadian Online Explorer reviewed the Impact! episodes involving the 2008 TNA World X Cup Tournament. For the first round, Chris said the bout between The Motor City Machine Guns and the team of Tyson Dux and Daivari "was a really good match." Meanwhile, Waldman reviewed the match between Team Japan and Team Mexico, in which he stated "the action is fast paced and unlike anything we see on North American TV." Bryan Sokol reviewed the first two standard matches of round two, with him commenting on the encounter between Bucanero and Koslov as being an "overall quick match with not much to talk about", but did not give an opinion on the Milano Collection A.T. versus Curry Man bout. Bryan and Chris Sokol reviewed the last two standard matches of round two together, with them saying that the contest pitting Masato Yoshino against Doug Williams was a "nice back and forth match." Neither gave their opinion on Kaz versus Último Guerrero in their review.

Bob Kapur also of the Canadian Online Explorer reviewed Victory Road. In his review, he gave the third round of the 2008 TNA World X Cup Tournament a 9 out of 10, while the final round received an 8 out of 10. Kapur gave several comments regarding the third round bout: "This was a throwback to some of the jaw-droppingly amazing X-Division matches that TNA used to deliver consistently back during their weekly PPV days. For the most part, the action was too quick and too plentiful to describe in words...Incredible match that went for about 30 minutes and seriously should be seen – get the replay or the DVD." As for the final round, Kapur said it was "like the first match" in that it "was excellent with some tremendous crazy spots."

== Aftermath ==
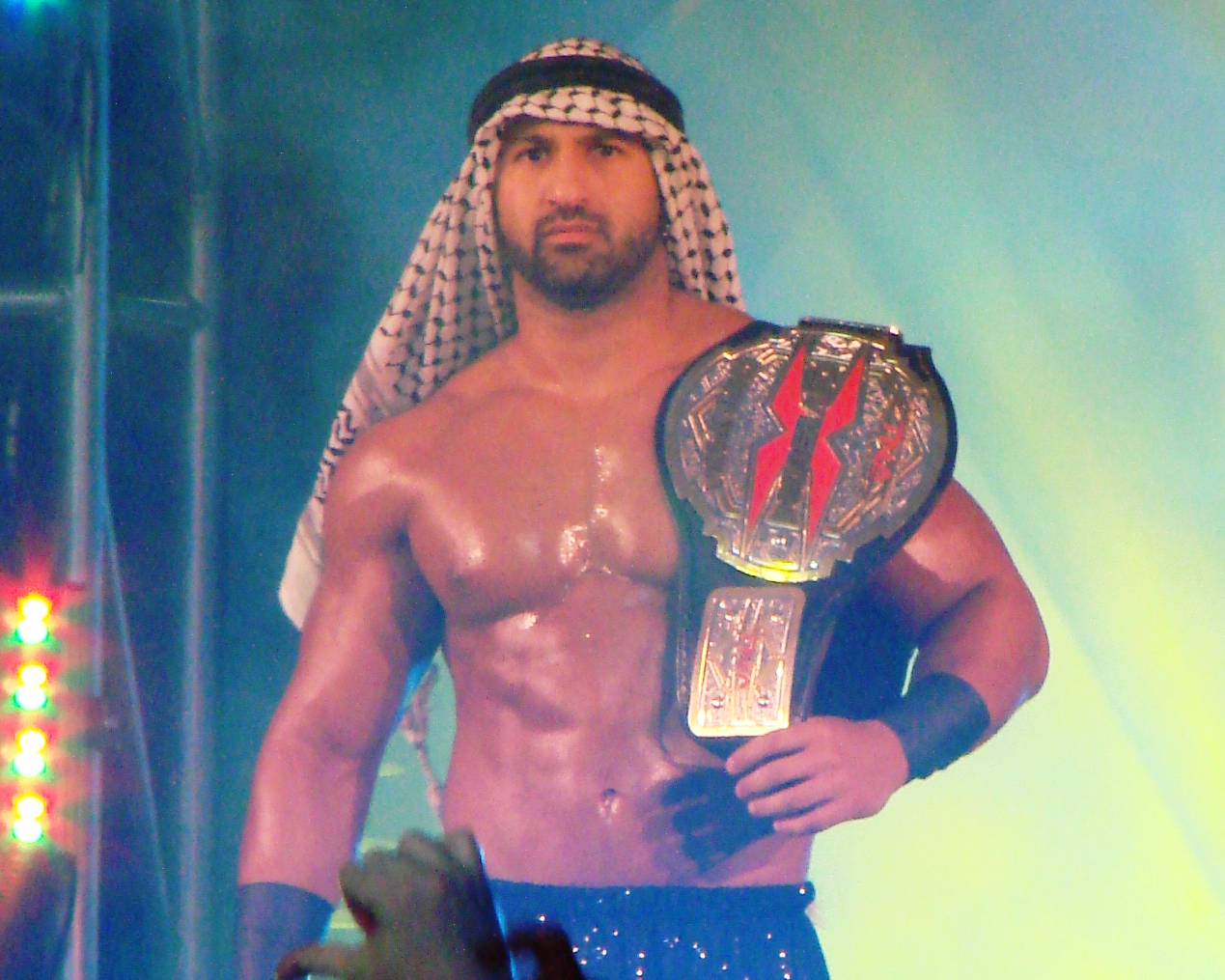
Daivari (pictured) went on to wrestle in TNA as "Shiek Abdul Bashir", under which he won the TNA X Division Championship (pictured).

After the 2008 TNA World X Cup Tournament concluded, Kaz challenged Petey Williams for the TNA X Division Championship on the July 17 episode of Impact!. Kaz failed to defeat Williams for the championship. Kaz then entered into a storyline in which he quit TNA due to his failure to win the World X Cup Tournament, the TNA World Heavyweight Championship, and the X Division Championship on several occasions, with the narrative beginning on the July 31 episode of Impact!. Kaz later returned as the Suicide character on December 7 at TNA's Final Resolution PPV event.

Daivari signed a contract with TNA following the tournament, debuting under the moniker "Sheik Abdul Bashir" at TNA's Hard Justice PPV event on August 10 attacking Consequences Creed during Creed's X Division Championship match with Petey Williams. Bashir went on to win the X Division Championship in a Three Way match with Creed and Williams at TNA's No Surrender PPV event on September 14. Bashir held the title until December, when he lost it to Eric Young at Final Resolution.

Chris Sabin and Alex Shelley went back to competing in the tag team division as The Motor City Machine Guns before both transitioned into the X Division, challenging each other for the vacant X Division Championship at TNA's Genesis PPV event on January 11, 2009. However, they also continued as a tag team, with the two winning the IWGP Junior Heavyweight Tag Team Championship on January 4, 2009 by defeating No Limit (Tetsuya Naito and Yujiro) at New Japan Pro-Wrestling's (NJPW) Wrestle Kingdom III in Tokyo Dome event. They then defended the NJPW championship in TNA against No Limit on the April 9, 2009 episode of Impact! successfully. The team defended it a second time in TNA, this time in a Three Way Six Sides of Steel Cage match with No Limit and The Latin American Xchange (Hernandez and Homicide) at TNA's Lockdown PPV event on April 19, 2009; they retained the championship at the show.

Curry Man went on to form the Price Justice Brotherhood with Shark Boy and Super Eric. The group fought The Rock 'n' Rave Infection (Lance Rock, Jimmy Rave, and Christy Hemme) in a Six Person Intergender Tag Team match at No Surrender. They won the contest at the show.

All remaining competitors in the tournament besides Volador Jr. and Doug Williams did not compete in TNA again for some time. Williams and Volador Jr both returned to TNA at their Turning Point PPV event on November 9, competing in a Ten Man X Division Elimination Rankings match. Volador Jr. competed as Volador in the contest but neither he nor Williams were successful in winning the bout.

== Standings ==
Position	Team	# of matches	Victories	Losses	Points
1st	Team Mexico	5	3	2	7
2nd	Team TNA (United States)	5	3	2	6
3rd	Team Japan	5	1	4	4
4th	Team International (United Nations)	5	1	4	3

== See also ==
- 2004 TNA World X Cup Tournament
- 2006 TNA World X Cup Tournament
- TNA X Cup Tournaments
- Total Nonstop Action Wrestling tournaments
- Victory Road 2008
