= 2005 TNA Super X Cup Tournament =

2005 Total Nonstop Action Wrestling tournament

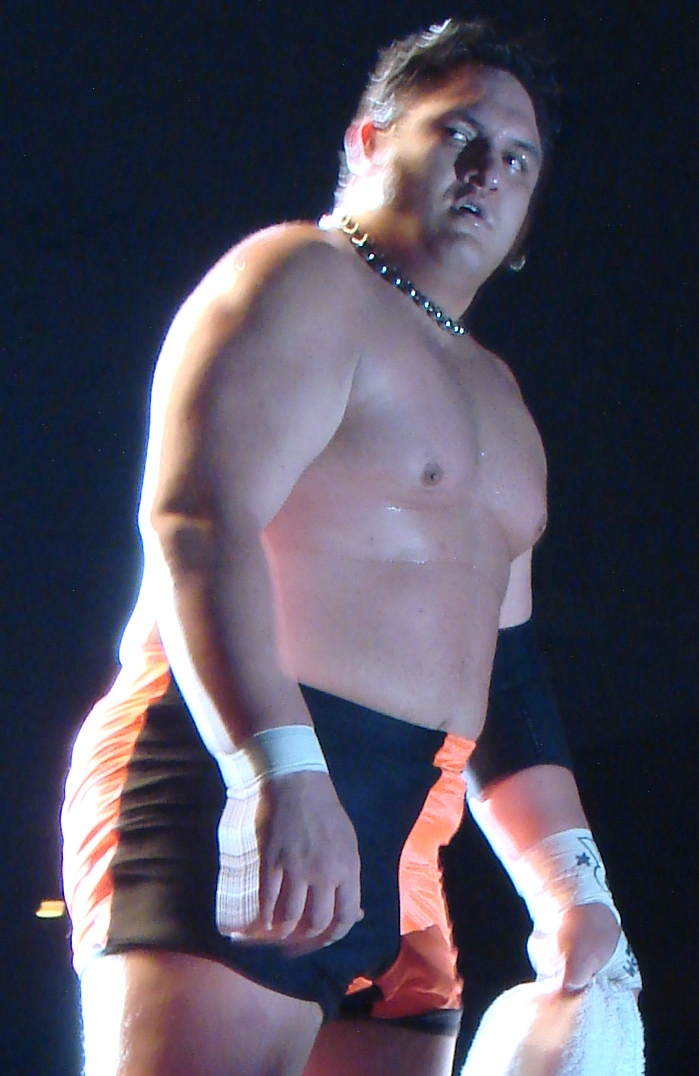
- The 2005 TNA Super X Cup Tournament winner, Samoa Joe
- Venue: TNA Impact! Zone
- Location: Orlando, Florida
- Start date: July 19, 2005
- End date: August 14, 2005
- Competitors: A.J. Styles; Alex Shelley; Chris Sabin; Matt Bentley; Petey Williams; Samoa Joe; Shocker; Sonjay Dutt

Champion
- Samoa Joe

The 2005 TNA Super X Cup Tournament was a professional wrestling single-elimination X Cup Tournament produced by the Total Nonstop Action Wrestling (TNA) promotion. It was the second-ever Super X Cup tournament and the last held until 2017. The competition began on July 19, 2005 and concluded on August 14, 2005 at TNA's Sacrifice pay-per-view (PPV) event. Then-TNA X Division Champion Christopher Daniels called the contest the "Christopher Daniels Invitational".

The tournament featured eight TNA X Division wrestlers: A.J. Styles, Alex Shelley, Chris Sabin, Michael Shane, Petey Williams, Samoa Joe, Shocker, and Sonjay Dutt. The event was preceded by a X Division four-way qualification match at TNA's No Surrender PPV event on July 17, 2005, in which Dutt defeated Elix Skipper, Mikey Batts and Shark Boy. Samoa Joe and A.J. Styles passed through the quarterfinals and the semifinals to make it to the tournament final at Sacrifice. Joe defeated Styles at the event, thus winning the Super X Cup trophy and becoming number one contender to the TNA X Division Championship at Unbreakable. Despite losing to Joe, Styles was added to the title match Joe received for winning the competition due to storyline reasons. TNA held a Three Way match for the TNA X Division Championship between Daniels, Joe, and Styles at the Unbreakable PPV event on September 11, 2005, which Styles won to become the new TNA X Division Champion.

Canadian Online Explorer columnist Corey David Lacroix reviewed Sacrifice, giving the Super X Cup final a rating of 8 out of 10. Lacorix said the final "could have been a certified Match of the Year contender if someone in the back had not decided to make Daniels interfere in this contest." He went on to say the match "was a thing of beauty that got stained." Wade Keller of the Pro Wrestling Torch gave the Super X Cup final four out of five stars. Keller wrote that it was a "four-star match that was begging to be given an extra ten minutes to be a match of the year candidate."

== Background ==
TNA editor Bill Banks announced the tournament in July 2005 in his "Bank Shot" column, adding that the final would be held at TNA's Sacrifice PPV event on August 14, 2005. The 2005 tournament was the second Super X Cup held. The first was the 2003 TNA Super X Cup Tournament, won by Chris Sabin in September 2003. Winners of Super X Cup tournaments receive trophies and a future TNA X Division Championship match.

TNA announced the final list of eight participants in July 2005: A.J. Styles, Alex Shelley, Sabin, Michael Shane, Petey Williams, Samoa Joe, Shocker, and Sonjay Dutt. Dutt defeated Elix Skipper, Mikey Batts, and Shark Boy in a Four Way Super X Cup qualification match on July 27, 2005, at TNA's No Surrender PPV event on July 17, 2005, to enter the tournament.

== Tournament ==
The 2005 TNA Super X Cup Tournament featured seven matches involving numerous wrestlers from pre-existing scripted feuds and storylines. Wrestlers portrayed villains, heroes and less distinguishable characters in scripted events that built tension and culminated in wrestling matches.

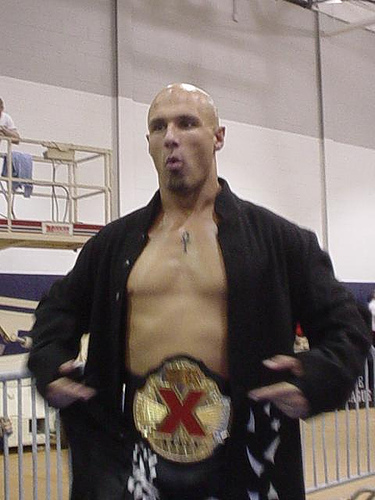
Then-TNA X Division Champion Christopher Daniels (pictured) nicknamed the tournament the "Christopher Daniels Invitational" and provided guest commentary for each match.

The tournament consisted of three rounds: the quarterfinals, semifinals, and finals. The quarterfinals and the semifinals took place on TNA's television program TNA Impact!, while the finals were held at Sacrifice. The quarterfinals were taped on July 19 and aired on the July 22 and July 29 episodes of Impact!. The semifinals were also taped on July 19 before airing on August 5 and August 10 episodes of Impact! Then-TNA X Division Champion Christopher Daniels provided commentary for each encounter. Daniels nicknamed the competition the "Christopher Daniels Invitational".

=== Quarterfinals ===
In the first of two quarterfinal matches aired on July 22, Samoa Joe fought Sonjay Dutt in a match lasting 9 minutes and 32 seconds. Joe won after forcing Dutt to submit with his signature Coquina Clutch submission hold. The second bout pitted A.J. Styles against Michael Shane. Before the match began, Shane announced he was changing his stage name to Matt Bentley. Styles won after America's Most Wanted (Chris Harris and James Storm) interfered. Harris distracted the referee, allowing Storm to kick Bentley in the face.

The third and fourth quarterfinal bouts aired on July 29. Alex Shelley fought Shocker in the first match of the episode, winning with a pinning combination at 5 minutes and 28 seconds. Petey Williams faced Chris Sabin in the second match. A-1 interfered during the encounter by distracting the referee and tossing Williams a hockey stick, which Williams used to hit Sabin across the stomach. He then performed his signature Canadian Destroyer maneuver, forcing Sabin's head into the mat and winning the match at 11 minutes and 45 seconds.

=== Semifinals ===
Joe, Shelley, Styles, and Williams advanced to the semifinals. The first match took place on the August 5 episode of Impact! between Joe and Shelley. Joe slammed Shelley back-first into the mat with his signature Muscle Buster maneuver and then choked him unconscious with the Coquina Clutch at 9 minutes and 4 seconds to win and advance to the finals. In the second semifinal match on August 10, Styles defeated Williams with a small package pin at 9 minutes and 19 seconds.

=== Final ===
The tournament final between A.J. Styles and Samoa Joe took place on August 14 at Sacrifice. As Styles laid against the ring ropes at the beginning of the match, Joe ran across the ring and kicked him in the face, causing him to fly out of the ring and crash down on the floor. Joe followed by diving through the ring ropes and smashing Styles in the face with his forearm as Styles reached his feet. Joe later held Styles in an STF submission hold, which he was forced to release when Styles touched the bottom rope. Styles then gained the advantage with a dropkick and front-flip splash from the ring ropes. He held Joe on his shoulders before twisting him off into a powerbomb, or what he calls a Rack Bomb. During the move, referee Andrew Thomas was kicked in the face and knocked unconscious, allowing Daniels to interfere in the contest. Daniels attacked Styles and attempted to hit Joe with the X Division Title belt before Styles threw Daniels from the ring. Joe followed by lifting Styles up and performing his Muscle Buster maneuver, then placing Styles in his Coquina Clutch submission hold. Styles submitted to the move as the referee came to, giving the victory to Joe. The final bout lasted 15 minutes and 15 seconds.

Joe's win gave him the Super X Cup trophy and made him the number-one contender for the TNA X Division Championship. He earned a title match against Daniels at TNA's Unbreakable PPV event on September 11.

=== Tournament bracket ===
First round Impact! July 19, 2005 (Aired July 22–29)
Samoa Joe	Submission
Sonjay Dutt	9:32
Alex Shelley	Pinfall
Shocker	5:28
A.J. Styles	Pinfall
Matt Bentley	10:53
Chris Sabin	11:45
Petey Williams	Pinfall

Semifinals; Impact! July 19, 2005 (Aired August 5–12)
Samoa Joe	Submission
Alex Shelley	9:04
A.J. Styles	Pinfall
Petey Williams	9:19

Final; Sacrifice; August 14, 2005
Samoa Joe	Submission
A.J. Styles	15:15

== Reception ==
James Caldwell of Pro Wrestling Torch called the Samoa Joe versus Sonjay Dutt encounter in the quarterfinals "another phenomenal match involving Samoa Joe," and wrote that it was "another reason to build the X Division – and the promotion – around Joe." Caldwell also praised the A.J. Styles versus Matt Bentley bout in the quarterfinals, calling it a "solid, methodical match that told a story in the ring." Canadian Online Explorer journalist Chris Sokol said the Styles versus Bentley contest was a "great match." Caldwell said of the July 29 quarterfinal between Alex Shelley and Shocker that "with Shelley winning the match using Shocker's traditional roll up pinning combination, Shelley looked strong coming out of the match for outsmarting his opponent." He went on to say if the bout had lasted longer it "could have allowed the match to tell a more complete story, but the match was good for delivering the intended purpose." Sokol said in a column about the show that it was an "excellent match". On the quarterfinal between Sabin and Williams, Caldwell said the two men "put together a solid finish that was ruined by yet another round of outside interference by Team Canada". Sokol called it "another excellent match."

Reviews of the semifinal matches on August 5 and 10 were also generally positive. Caldwell said the Joe versus Shelley contest was "another outstanding Samoa Joe match." Sokol said the Styles versus Williams bout was a "back and forth match", and Caldwell said it was "a solid match" that was "nothing spectacular or particularly breathtaking, but it didn't need to be because the crowd was into the match simply because of who was in the ring." He went on to say that the wrestlers "didn't need to pull of a four star match with amazing spots to wow the crowd because they had the audience captivated from the get-go."

Canadian Online Explorer columnist Corey David Lacroix reviewed Sacrifice, giving the Super X Cup Final an 8 out of 10 rating. Lacorix wrote that the Super X Cup Final "could have been a certified Match of the Year contender if someone in the back had not decided to make Daniels interfere in this contest." He went on to say the match "was a thing of beauty that got stained." Wade Keller of the Pro Wrestling Torch gave the Super X Cup Final four stars out of five, calling it a "four star match that was begging to be given an extra ten minutes to be a match of the year candidate."

== Aftermath ==
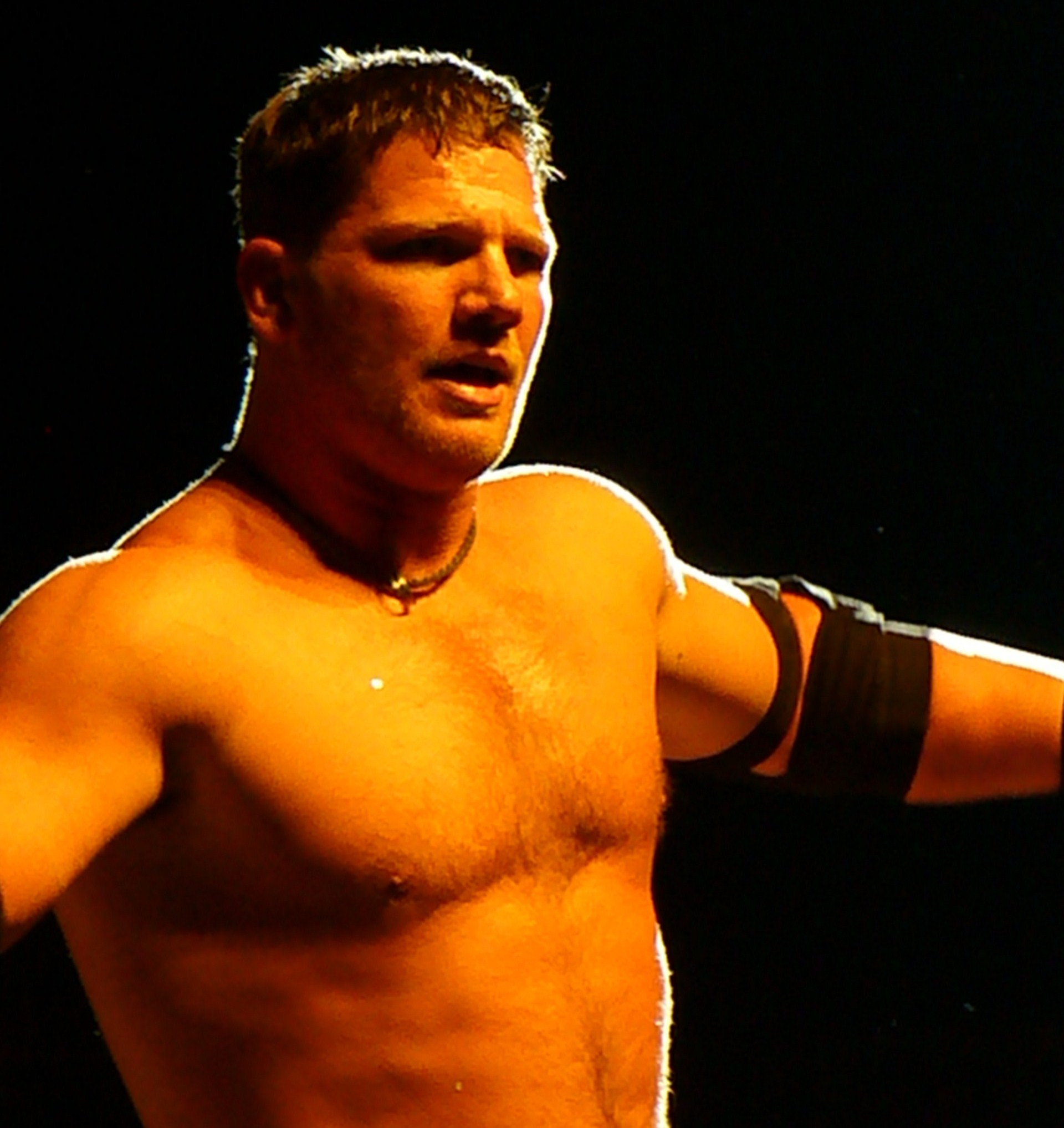
A.J. Styles (pictured) defeated TNA X Division Champion Christopher Daniels and Samoa Joe in a Three Way match to win the TNA X Division Championship at Unbreakable.

A.J. Styles suffered a tendon injury during his title bout with Samoa Joe at Sacrifice. TNA management kept him out of the following Impact! tapings, hoping to keep him rested and not risk any further injury despite expectations that he would not be sidelined long. Styles, however, canceled an appearance in the Ring of Honor promotion on August 20. He came back for a promotion on August 27 at their Dragon's Gate Invasion event, losing a match to CIMA.

After winning the 2005 TNA Super X Cup tournament, Samoa Joe was set to face Christopher Daniels for the TNA X Division Championship at Unbreakable. On the August 19 episode of Impact!, however, Styles assaulted Daniels in an act of revenge for Daniels' interference at Sacrifice. Daniels demanded Styles be suspended for this action. NWA Championship Committee member Larry Zbyszko denied the request, and instead added Styles to the planned encounter at Unbreakable, thus making it a Three Way match for the TNA X Division Championship. TNA promoted the match as an X Division "Dream Bout" pitting the top competitors in the division against each other for the championship. Styles won the match and the title by pinning Daniels. Wrestling journalist Dave Meltzer bestowed a rare 5 Star match rating to the bout between A.J. Styles, Christopher Daniels and Samoa Joe.

The three-way match began an extended storyline involving its participants. At TNA's Bound for Glory PPV event on October 23, Styles defeated Daniels in a 30-minute Iron Man match to retain the TNA X Division Championship. TNA then held a Four-on-Four Elimination X match at the Genesis PPV event on November 13. In that match, the team of Alex Shelley, Daniels, Joe, and Roderick Strong defeated the team of Austin Aries, Chris Sabin, Matt Bentley, and Sonjay Dutt. After the contest, Joe assaulted Daniels, performing his signature Muscle Buster maneuver on him twice, the second time on a steel chair. Daniels suffered an injury in the storyline in the attack, sidelining him until December 11's TNA Turning Point PPV event. At that event, Daniels saved Styles from an assault by Joe following Joe's victory over Styles to win the TNA X Division Championship. Daniels then challenged Joe for the championship at TNA's Final Resolution PPV event on January 15, 2006, but Joe retained the title. At TNA's Against All Odds PPV event on February 12, 2006, Daniels, Joe, and Styles competed in another three-way match for the TNA X Division Championship; Joe gained the pinfall to retain the title. The three competed again in a three-way Ultimate X match for the championship at TNA's Destination X PPV event on March 12, 2006. Daniels won, becoming the new TNA X Division Champion. The rivalry ended on the April 13, 2006 episode of Impact! when Joe defeated Daniels to win back the championship.

Due to the popularity of the rivalry between the three in 2005 and 2006, TNA held another three-way match at TNA's Turning Point PPV event on November 15, 2009, this time for the TNA World Heavyweight Championship. Then-champion Styles retained his title, beating Daniels and Joe. Styles went on to successfully defend the title against Daniels at the following TNA PPV event, Final Resolution, on December 20, 2009.

Most of the wrestlers involved in the 2005 TNA Super X Cup Tournament, excluding Bentley, Styles, and Joe, went on to compete in the Chris Candido Memorial Tag Team Tournament. In that contest, eight tag teams were drawn at random, and veteran wrestlers were matched with younger wrestlers. Shelley partnered with Sean Waltman, Sabin and Shocker were placed together, Dutt was placed with Ron Killings, and Kip James and Petey Williams teamed up in the tournament. Sabin and Shocker ended faced Shelley and Waltman in the tournament final on the September 9, 2005 episode of Impact!. Shelley and Waltman won to win the Chris Candido Cup.
