= TNA Sacrifice (2006) =

2006 Total Nonstop Action Wrestling pay-per-view event

Sacrifice (2006)
- DVD cover featuring Christian Cage and Abyss
- Promotion: Total Nonstop Action Wrestling
- Date: May 14, 2006
- City: Orlando, Florida
- Venue: Impact Zone
- Attendance: 900
- Tagline(s): Global Turmoil

Pay-per-view chronology
← Previous; Lockdown	Next → Slammiversary

Sacrifice chronology
← Previous; 2005	Next → 2007

The 2006 Sacrifice was a professional wrestling pay-per-view (PPV) event produced by Total Nonstop Action Wrestling (TNA), which took place on May 14, 2006 at the Impact Zone in Orlando, Florida. It was the second event under the Sacrifice chronology. Eight matches were featured on the event's card.

In October 2017, with the launch of the Global Wrestling Network, the event became available to stream on demand.

== Storylines ==
Eight matches were featured on the event's card. The event featured wrestlers from pre-existing scripted feuds and storylines. Wrestlers portrayed villains, heroes, or less distinguishable characters in the scripted events that built tension and culminated in a wrestling match or series of matches.

== Results ==
No.	Results	Stipulations	Times
1	Jushin Thunder Liger (with Black Tiger, Minoru Tanaka and Hirooki Goto) defeated Petey Williams (with Eric Young, Johnny Devine and Tyson Dux)	World X Cup Tournament match	8:30
2	America's Most Wanted (Chris Harris and James Storm) (c) defeated A.J. Styles and Christopher Daniels	Tag team match for the NWA World Tag Team Championship	15:40
3	Raven defeated A-1 (with Larry Zbyszko)	Singles match	5:30
4	Bobby Roode (with Coach D'Amore) defeated Rhino	Singles match	12:16
5	The James Gang (B.G. James and Kip James) defeated Team 3D (Brother Ray and Brother Devon)	Tag team match	9:40
6	Petey Williams defeated Minoru Tanaka, Puma, Chris Sabin, Hirooki Goto, Incognito, Johnny Devine, Sonjay Dutt, Black Tiger, Magno, Eric Young, Alex Shelley, Jushin Thunder Liger, Shocker, Tyson Dux and Jay Lethal	World X Cup Gauntlet match	18:13
7	Sting and Samoa Joe defeated Jeff Jarrett and Scott Steiner (with Gail Kim)	Tag team match	14:30
8	Christian Cage (c) defeated Abyss (with James Mitchell)	Full Metal Mayhem match for the NWA World Heavyweight Championship	16:14
(c) / – the champion(s) heading into the match
