= 2006 TNA World X Cup Tournament =

2006 World X Cup
TNA 2006 World X Cup Tournament

Tournament details
- Host country: United States
- Dates: April 27-May 18, 2006
- Teams: 4
- Venue: 1

Final positions
- Champions: United States (2nd title)
- Runners-up: Canada
- Third place: Mexico
- Fourth place: Japan

The TNA 2006 World X Cup Tournament was a professional wrestling X Cup Tournament staged by Total Nonstop Action Wrestling in April and May 2006. The tournament pits stables of X Division-style wrestlers from around the world against one another in a series of singles and tag team matches, with the teams earning points for victories.

Team USA won the World X Cup for the second time in a row after team captain Chris Sabin defeated Team Canada captain Petey Williams to break a 5-5 tie on the May 18, 2006 edition of TNA Impact!. This is Chris Sabin's second World X Cup Championship, as he was a member of Team USA in 2004.

Several matches leading up to the World X Cup were billed as "World X Cup preview matches", including a X Division six-man tag team match between members of Team USA and Team Japan at Lockdown, in which Team Japan were victorious; and the aforementioned International X Division four-way match at Destination X, featuring Chris Sabin, Petey Williams, Puma and Sonjay Dutt, representing the United States, Canada, Japan and India respectively (Puma and Dutt would go on to compete for Mexico and the US).

== History ==
The 2004 World X Cup took place in May 2004, with Team USA defeating Team Canada, Team Japan, Team Mexico, and Team Britain. In October 2005, TNA website manager Bill Banks announced that, as a result of the working relationship between TNA and the Japanese New Japan Pro-Wrestling promotion, TNA were considering hosting a second World X Cup, this time featuring members of the NJPW roster.

On the February 18, 2006 episode of TNA Impact!, it was announced that the World X Cup was to return in 2006. Later that evening, Jay Lethal defeated "The Prince of Punk" Shannon Moore and Roderick Strong in a X Division three-way match to become the first member of the 2006 Team USA. On the March 11, 2006 episode of Impact!, Chris Sabin became the second member of Team USA when he defeated Sonjay Dutt and Alex Shelley in another X Division three-way match. On the March 18, 2006 episode of Impact!, Sonjay Dutt defeated Maverick Matt and Elix Skipper in a third X Division three-way match to become the third member of Team USA. On the April 8, 2006 episode of Impact!, Alex Shelley defeated Roderick Strong and Chase Stevens to become the fourth and final member of Team USA.

Team Mexico and Team Japan were quickly announced as competitors in the 2006 World X Cup, much like they were in the 2004 World X Cup. Team UK was planned, but they were replaced by Team Canada, after two of the members, Doug Williams and Nigel McGuinness were already booked to wrestle in Japan. The other members were to be Jonny Storm and Jody Fleisch.

== Rules ==
The competition is divided into three rounds.

- In Round One, there are two tag team matches. The two winning teams get two points apiece.
- In Round Two, there are two singles matches. The winners get three points for their respective teams.
- In Round Three, there will be a gauntlet involving all 16 wrestlers. The last two remaining wrestlers receive two points apiece for their respective teams. The winner gets an additional three points for his team. If the final two are on the same team, then they will automatically receive all seven points, and thus win the tournament.
- In the event of a tie, the captains of the two teams will compete in a singles match in order to determine the champion.

== Teams and Members ==
- Team USA
  - (United States) Chris Sabin (Captain)
  - (United States) Jay Lethal
  - (United States) Sonjay Dutt
  - (United States) Alex Shelley
- Team Canada
  - (Canada) Petey Williams (Captain)
  - (Canada) Eric Young
  - (Canada) Johnny Devine
  - (Canada) Tyson Dux
- Team Mexico
  - (Mexico) Shocker (Captain)
  - (Mexico) Puma
  - (Mexico) Magno
  - (Mexico) Incognito
- Team Japan
  - (Japan) Jushin Thunder Liger (Captain)
  - (Japan) Hirooki Goto
  - (Japan) Minoru Tanaka
  - (Japan) Black Tiger

== Results ==
=== Round One (Tag Team Matches) - 1 Point ===
- TNA Impact!: April 27, 2006
  - (United States) Team USA (Sonjay Dutt and Alex Shelley) defeated Team Japan (Hirooki Goto and Minoru)
- TNA Impact!: May 4, 2006
  - Team Mexico (Shocker and Magno) defeated Team Canada (Eric Young and Johnny Devine)

=== Round 2 (Singles Matches) - 2 Points ===
- TNA Impact!:May 11, 2006
  - (United States) Team USA's Chris Sabin defeated Team Mexico's Puma
- TNA Sacrifice: May 14, 2006
  - Team Japan's Jushin Thunder Liger defeated Team Canada's Petey Williams

=== Round 3 (The Gauntlet) - 5 Points ===
- TNA Sacrifice: May 14, 2006
  - 16-man Gauntlet: Team Canada's Petey Williams won, last eliminating Team Mexico's Puma
    - Team Mexico gained three points for coming in second, Team USA gained two points for coming in third, and Team Japan gained one point for coming in fourth.

==== Entry and elimination order ====
The order of entry in the gauntlet match included a pattern: Japan, Mexico, Canada, USA. This is identical to the final standings in reverse.

Entry No.	Wrestler	Elim. No.	Eliminated by
1	(Japan) Minoru Tanaka	8	(United States) Jay Lethal
2	(Mexico) Puma	15	(Canada) Petey Williams
3	(Canada) Petey Williams	Winner	
4	(United States) Chris Sabin	3	(Canada) Johnny Devine
5	(Japan) Hirooki Goto	7	(United States) Alex Shelley
6	(Mexico) Incognito	1=	(United States) Sonjay Dutt
7	(Canada) Johnny Devine	4	(United States) Alex Shelley
8	(United States) Sonjay Dutt	1=	(Mexico) Incognito
9	(Japan) Black Tiger	6	(Mexico) Shocker
10	(Mexico) Magno	5	(Japan) Jushin Thunder Liger
11	(Canada) Eric Young	11	(United States) Jay Lethal
12	(United States) Alex Shelley	13	(Canada) Petey Williams
13	(Japan) Jushin Thunder Liger	10	(Canada) Tyson Dux
14	(Mexico) Shocker	9	(United States) Alex Shelley
15	(Canada) Tyson Dux	12	(United States) Alex Shelley
16	(United States) Jay Lethal	14	(Mexico) Puma

=== Round Four (Tie-breaker) - 1 Point ===
- TNA Impact!: May 18, 2006
  - (United States) Team USA's Chris Sabin defeated Team Canada's Petey Williams

== Standings ==
The standings for the 2004 and 2006 World X Cups were identical; in both, Team USA was ranked first, Canada second, Mexico third and Japan fourth.

- (United States) Team USA: 6
- Team Canada: 5
- Team Mexico: 4
- Team Japan: 3
