= Team Canada (TNA) =

Professional wrestling stable

Statistics
- Members: (Canada) Scott D'Amore (Canada) Teddy Hart (Canada) Petey Williams (Canada) Johnny Devine (United States) Jack Evans (Canada) Bobby Roode (Canada) Eric Young (Canada) Ruffy Silverstein (Canada) A-1 (Canada) Tyson Dux
- Name: Team Canada
- Debut: Early 2004

Team Canada was a heel professional wrestling stable in Total Nonstop Action Wrestling (TNA), which was active from 2004 to 2006.

== History ==
=== 2004 X-Cups ===
In 2004, wrestling promoter and personality "Coach" Scott D'Amore brought together fellow Canadians to form his own incarnation of Team Canada in Total Nonstop Action Wrestling (TNA) for the 2004 America's X-Cup Tournament.

The original team was composed of Teddy Hart as team captain, with Jack Evans, Johnny Devine, and Petey Williams as his teammates. When the World X-Cup was announced, the team was revamped to add power to the speed and agility in the previous incarnation of the team. Petey Williams would replace Hart as team captain, Johnny Devine would remain on the team, and Eric Young and Bobby Roode would be added to the team. The team made it to the Ultimate X finals, but lost to Team USA (Jerry Lynn, Chris Sabin, Christopher Daniels and Elix Skipper).

=== Regular competition ===
After the 2004 World X-Cup Tournament, Team Canada became the only team that stayed together in TNA afterward, and went on to win the tag team titles twice. Captain Petey Williams also won the TNA X Division Championship. All used the same theme music (an acoustic O Canada, begun with a riff of the first line on electric guitar), and typically brought a Canadian flag with them, attached to a hockey stick.

Team Canada hosted the Canadian version of the TNA website, and shirts for Team Canada would have the TNA logo on the front with the A covered up with a maple leaf with "Eh!" on it.

In March 2005, Team Canada added Alastair "A-1" Ralphs to replace the injured Johnny Devine. A-1 was used as a "powerhouse" member, and was dubbed "The Muscle Man".

=== Planet Jarrett ===
In September 2005, Team Canada aligned with Planet Jarrett, with Scott D'Amore using a match at his Border City Wrestling promotion to help Jeff Jarrett win back the NWA World Heavyweight Championship on September 15. The plot was exposed on the October 1 episode of TNA Impact! Team Canada's alignment was solidified when they appeared—dressed in black with black hockey sticks—at Planet Jarrett's "funeral" for the careers of Team 3D on the October 15 Impact! episode.

At Genesis on November 13, when Christian Cage debuted in TNA, Scott D'Amore offered him a Team Canada T-shirt to signify membership in that stable. At the end of the night, when Team Canada attacked Team 3D with Jeff Jarrett, Cage came out. Under the coat he wore, he revealed to D'Amore's delight that he was wearing the Team Canada shirt. He hugged D'Amore before delivering the Unprettier, making his choice not to join Team Canada or Planet Jarrett clear.

They feuded with 3Live Kru throughout 2005. They fought 3LK (afterwards dubbed 4Live Kru after the induction of Kip James) for the last time at Turning Point on December 11, where Konnan split from the group and hit Kip James with a chair, allowing Team Canada to win.

Following the disbanding of the 3LK, Team Canada embarked on a lengthy feud against Team 3D, which had seen them beating down Team 3D in Six Sides of Steel and laying Canadian flags over their faces. Team Canada also helped America's Most Wanted on numerous occasions, an ironic twist considering their history. Team Canada was defeated by Team 3D at Lockdown in an Anthem Match where either the USA or Canadian flag would be raised along with the country's music played.

=== 2006 World X-Cup Tournament ===
Team Canada took part in the 2006 World X-Cup. Bobby Roode and A-1 stepped aside as non-X Division athletes, leaving Petey Williams, Eric Young, the returning Johnny Devine and the debut of Tyson Dux as Team Canada's X-Cup squad.

Despite early success in exhibitions at the expense of miscommunication on the part of Team USA. Team Canada lost both their first round and second round matches, falling behind early. In the first round, they were defeated by Team USA members Alex Shelley and Sonjay Dutt, then in the second round, Petey Williams lost to Team Japan captain Jushin Thunder Liger.

Team Canada turned their fortunes around at Sacrifice 2006 in the "Global Turmoil" main event, in which Petey Williams scored a win over Puma in the final to tie Team USA for the top score in the World X-Cup. Following Sacrifice, team captains Petey Willians and Chris Sabin faced off on TNA Impact!, where Team USA won for the second time in the history of the tournament.

After the World X-Cup, Johnny Devine stopped appearing, leaving the roster to regress to Williams, Roode, Young and A-1 (as it was before the tournament).

=== Disbanding ===
On the June 29 episode of Impact!, Jim Cornette announced that Team Canada was disbanded. He later allowed them an all-or-nothing 8-man tag team match on the July 13 episode against Rhino, Team 3D, and Jay Lethal, with a stipulation that the disbanding order would be null and void if Team Canada won; Jay Lethal pinned A-1, ending Team Canada's run as a group in TNA.

At Victory Road, D'Amore would bring all four members of Team Canada out for one last time to say his farewells to each member. He started with Roode saying he would be a future world champion, followed by saying to Petey that he would excel in the X Division, telling A1 he was a true powerhouse, and finally blaming Young by claiming it was his fault that they were disbanded.

=== World X-Cup 2008 ===
Due to the disbanding of Team Canada in 2006, Team Canada was not allowed to enter the 2008 World X-Cup. Tyson Dux who was on the X-Cup Team Canada was a part of Team International.

=== Reunions ===
==== 2009 ====
Team Canada members Petey Williams and Eric Young reunited for one night only on the February 10, 2009 edition of Impact!, (aired February 19) using the Team Canada entrance music and wearing Team Canada Jackets. On several occasions during the match announcers Mike Tenay and Don West referred to the pair as "the reunited Team Canada."

The newly reunited pair challenged for the TNA World Tag Team Championship in Beer Money, Inc.'s Off the Wagon Challenge, the stipulation being if the challengers lost, the man who was pinned or made to submit would leave TNA for good. It was this stipulation that ultimately ended the reunion as Robert Roode (former Team Canada member) pinned Petey Williams to retain the titles and forced him to leave TNA.

==== 2023 ====
At Slammiversary on July 15, 2023, Team Canada reunited when Eric Young made his surprise return to Impact after a seven-month absence and teamed with Scott D'Amore as his mystery tag team partner against Bully Ray and Deaner. D'Amore and Young used the Team Canada entrance music and attire and went on to defeat Ray and Deaner. At Impact 1000, Young and D'Amore competed as Team Canada to compete against Kenny King and Sheldon Jean, a match which they won by disqualification after interference by The Design (Deaner and Kon). America's Most Wanted made the save, which led to Team Canada and AMW defeating King, Jean, and Design in an eight-man tag team match.

== Members ==
- (Canada) Scott D'Amore (2004–2006) (final coach)
- (Canada) Teddy Hart (2004) (former captain)
- (Canada) Petey Williams (2004–2006) (final captain)
- (Canada) Johnny Devine (2004–2006)
- (United States) Jack Evans (2004)
- (Canada) Bobby Roode (2004–2006)
- (Canada) Eric Young (2004–2006)
- (Canada) Ruffy Silverstein (2004)
- (Canada) A-1 (2005–2006)
- (Canada) Tyson Dux (2006)

=== X Cup teams ===
==== America's X Cup 2004 ====
- (Canada) Teddy Hart (Captain)
- (United States) Jack Evans
- (Canada) Petey Williams
- (Canada) Johnny Devine

==== World X Cup 2004 ====
- (Canada) Petey Williams (Captain)
- (Canada) Bobby Roode
- (Canada) Eric Young
- (Canada) Johnny Devine

==== World X Cup 2006 ====
- (Canada) Petey Williams (Captain)
- (Canada) Eric Young
- (Canada) Johnny Devine
- (Canada) Tyson Dux

== Competitive record ==
=== World X Cup record ===
Competition	Notes	Position	Points	Captain
2004 America's X Cup		N/A	N/A	Teddy Hart
2004 World X Cup		2nd	4	Petey Williams
2006 World X Cup		2nd	5	Petey Williams

== Championships and accomplishments ==
- Total Nonstop Action Wrestling

- TNA X Division Championship (1 time) – Petey Williams
- NWA World Tag Team Championship (2 times) – Bobby Roode and Eric Young

- Border City Wrestling

- BCW Can-Am Tag Team Championship (1 time) – Bobby Roode and Petey Williams

== See also ==
- The Hart Foundation
