= Turning Point =

A turning point, or climax, is the point of highest tension in a narrative work.

Turning Point, Turning Points or The Turning Point may refer to:

== Film ==
- The Turning Point, a 1914 silent film starring Caroline Cooke
- The Turning Point (1920 film), an American film starring Katherine MacDonald
- The Turning Point (1945 film), a Soviet film by Fridrikh Markovitch Ermler
- The Turning Point (1952 film), a crime drama starring Edmond O'Brien
- Turning Point (1960 film), an Australian TV play
- The Turning Point (1977 film), a drama starring Shirley MacLaine and Anne Bancroft
- The Turning Point (1978 film), a Soviet drama film directed by Vadim Abdrashitov
- The Turning Point (1983 film), an East German film by Frank Beyer
- Turning Point (2009 Hong Kong film), a spin-off to the 2009 Hong Kong television drama series E.U.
- Turning Point (2009 American film), a documentary film on the travels of Michelle Yeoh
- Turning Point (2012 film), a 2012 drama film by Niyi Towolawi
- The Turning Point (2022 film), an Italian film

== Literature ==
- The Turning Point (book), a 1982 nonfiction book by Fritjof Capra
- The Turning Point: Best of Young Indian Writers, a 2014 anthology including works by Nikita Singh
- Batman: Turning Points, a 5-issue limited series of comics
- The Turning Point, a 1942 autobiography by Klaus Mann
- "The Turning Point", a 1988 short story by Isaac Asimov

== Music ==
=== Albums ===
- Turning Point (Benny Golson album) (1962)
- Turning Point (Mario album) (2004)
- The Turning Point (John Mayall album) (1969)
- The Turning Point (McCoy Tyner album) (1992)
- Turning Point (Lonnie Smith album) (1969)
- Turning Point (Pink Lady album) (1980)
- Turning Point (Chuck Wicks album) (2016)
- Turning Point (Kevin Eubanks album) (1992)
- Turning Point (Paul Bley album)
- Turning Point, a 1995 album by Rory Block
- Turning Point (Dr SID album) (2010)

=== Songs ===
- "Turning Point" (song), by Tyrone Davis, 1976
- "Turning Point", a song by Buckwheat Zydeco
- "Turning Point", a 2013 song by Killswitch Engage from Disarm the Descent
- "Turning Point", a song by Mighty Joe Young
- "Turning Point", a 1967 song by Nina Simone from Silk & Soul
- "The Turning Point", a song by Toto from Tambu

=== Performers ===
- Turning Point (American band), an American straight-edge hardcore band
- Turning Point (UK band), a late 1970s UK fusion band

== Organizations ==
- Turning Point (charity), a social care organisation in the UK
- Turning Point Alcohol and Drug Centre, in Melbourne, Australia
- Turning Point Suffragist Memorial, a Virginia monument to American suffragists
- Turning Point USA, an American conservative, right-wing organization
  - Turning Point Action, sister political advocacy organization of Turning Point USA
  - Turning Point Australia, an Australian organisation licensed by Turning Point USA
  - Turning Point UK, an off-shoot of Turning Point USA

== Television ==
- Turning Point (ministry), carried on TBN, broadcast from San Diego County, US
- Turning Point (1991 TV series), an Indian science magazine TV series
- Turning Point (TV program) (1994–1999), an American news program
- Turning Points of History, a History Television series
- Impact Wrestling Turning Point, a professional wrestling pay-per-view event and episode of Impact Wrestling
  - Turning Point (2004 wrestling), the first event in the series
  - Turning Point (2005 wrestling), a professional wrestling pay-per-view event
  - Turning Point (2006 wrestling), a professional wrestling pay-per-view event
  - Turning Point (2007 wrestling), a professional wrestling pay-per-view event
  - Turning Point (2008 wrestling), a professional wrestling pay-per-view event
  - Turning Point (2009 wrestling), a professional wrestling pay-per-view event
  - Turning Point (2010 wrestling), a professional wrestling pay-per-view event
  - Turning Point (2011 wrestling), a professional wrestling pay-per-view event
  - Turning Point (2012 wrestling), a professional wrestling pay-per-view event
  - "Turning Point" (2013 wrestling), a professional wrestling episode of Impact Wrestling
  - Turning Point (January 2015 wrestling), a professional wrestling pay-per-view event as part of the One Night Only series
  - "Turning Point" (August 2015 wrestling), a professional wrestling episode of Impact Wrestling
  - "Turning Point" (2016 wrestling), a professional wrestling episode of Impact Wrestling
  - Turning Point (2019 wrestling), a professional wrestling exclusive event on Impact Plus
- "Turning Point" (Amphibia), an episode of Amphibia
- "Turning Point" (Planetes episode)
- "Turning Point" (Spider-Man), an episode of the 1994 animated series
- "The Turning Point" (The Vampire Diaries), a 2009 episode of The Vampire Diaries
- Turning Point: 9/11 and the War on Terror, a 2021 American five-part docuseries
- Turning Point: The Bomb and the Cold War, a 2024 American nine-part docuseries

== Other uses ==
- Turning Point for God, multi-media broadcast ministry
- Turning Point: Fall of Liberty, a 2008 first-person shooter video game
- Turning point, in mathematics, a stationary point at which the derivative changes sign
- Turning Points in Design – 2025 exhibition at the Museum of Modern Art

== See also ==
- Cursus (classical)
- Turning (disambiguation)
