= TNA Turning Point (2024) =

2024 TNA Wrestling event

Turning Point
- Promotional poster
- Promotion: Total Nonstop Action Wrestling
- Date: November 29, 2024
- City: Winston-Salem, North Carolina
- Venue: Benton Convention Center

TNA+ Monthly Specials chronology
← Previous; Victory Road	Next → Final Resolution

Turning Point chronology
← Previous; 2023	Next → 2025

The 2024 Turning Point was a professional wrestling event produced by Total Nonstop Action Wrestling as a part of WrestleCade. It took place on November 29, 2024, at the Benton Convention Center in Winston-Salem, North Carolina, and aired on TNA+. It was the 19th event under the Turning Point chronology.

Eight matches were contested at the event, including one on the Countdown to Turning Point pre-show. In the main event, Nic Nemeth defeated Eddie Edwards to retain the TNA World Championship. In other prominent matches, Masha Slamovich defeated Jordynne Grace 2–1 in a two out of three falls match to retain the TNA Knockouts World Championship, Steve Maclin defeated Josh Alexander in a No Disqualification match, and Moose defeated Laredo Kid to retain the TNA X Division Championship. The event also featured the TNA debut of Matt Riddle.

== Production ==
=== Background ===
Turning Point was a pay-per-view (PPV) event produced by Total Nonstop Action Wrestling between 2004 and 2012. In 2013, TNA discontinued most of its monthly pay-per-view events in favor of the pre-recorded One Night Only events. The event would be held as a special episode of Impact! in 2013, 2015, 2016, and has been a monthly special for Impact Plus in 2019, 2020, 2021 and 2023. On July 11, 2024, it was announced that Turning Point would take place on November 29 as a part of that year's WrestleCade, at the Benton Convention Center in Winston-Salem, North Carolina.

=== Storylines ===
The event featured several professional wrestling matches that involved different wrestlers from pre-existing scripted feuds, plots, and storylines. Wrestlers portrayed heroes, villains, or less distinguishable characters in scripted events that build tension and culminate in a wrestling match or series of matches. Storylines were produced on TNA's weekly programs, Impact! and Xplosion.

On the October 31 episode of Impact!, The System (Eddie Edwards and JDC) defeated Joe Hendry and TNA World Champion Nic Nemeth in a tag team match; miscommunication between the latter team allowing Edwards to pin Nemeth. The following week, TNA officially announced that Edwards would challenge Nemeth for the TNA World Championship at Turning Point.

At Bound for Glory, Masha Slamovich defeated Jordynne Grace to win the TNA Knockouts World Championship. Two weeks later on Impact!, Alisha Edwards – Slamovich's former tag team partner – came out to the arena and berated her former partner. Slamovich would confront Edwards shortly after, challenging her to a No Disqualification match for the Knockouts World Championship for next week's show. Grace then interrupted the two, revealing that she'd invoked her rematch clause for Turning Point and would face either Slamovich or Edwards for the title at the event. The following week, Slamovich defeated Edwards to defend her title, officially making her champion against Grace at Turning Point, who she challenged to a two out of three falls match for the title.

On the November 14 Impact!, TNA announced the return of the TNA Turkey Bowl, a Thanksgiving tradition consisting of a multi-person match where the loser would be forced to wear a turkey suit. Joe Hendry, Eric Young, Hammerstone, Brian Myers, TNA Digital Media Champion and International Heavyweight Wrestling Champion PCO, and John Skyler were announced as participants.

At Bound for Glory, Josh Alexander defeated Steve Maclin after a low blow and binding his hands with plastic handcuffs. Since then, Maclin had been obsessed with trying to get back at Alexander, even at the cost of losing matches against The Northern Armory (Alexander, Judas Icarus, and Travis Williams). On November 19, TNA announced a rematch between Alexander and Maclin for Turning Point in a No Disqualification match. The following week, TNA also announced that the rest of the Northern Armory would be banned from ringside during the match.

On the July 4 Impact!, Frankie Kazarian defeated Mike Santana as part of the "Road to Slammiversary" series to qualify for the TNA World Championship match at Slammiversary; JDC attacking Santana on the outside and giving Kazarian the victory via countout. Several months later on November 21, Santana cut a promo in the ring about his goals of winning the world title, before being confronted by Kazarian, the winner of the Call Your Shot Gauntlet at Bound for Glory. The two would argue over who would become the next champion, ending with Santana challenging Kazarian to a match at Turning Point. TNA would later make the match official.

On the November 21 episode of Impact!, Laredo Kid and Leon Slater defeated The System (JDC and TNA X Division Champion Moose), with Slater pinning JDC for the win. The System would then attack Slater after the match before being chased off by a chair-wielding Laredo Kid. TNA then announced that Moose would defend the X Division Championship against Laredo Kid at Turning Point.

== Results ==
No.	Results	Stipulations	Times
1^{P}	Rosemary defeated Savannah Evans and Xia Brookside by pinfall	Three-way match	9:11
2	Mike Santana defeated Frankie Kazarian by pinfall	Singles match	12:27
3	Joe Hendry defeated Brian Myers, Eric Young, Hammerstone, John Skyler, and Rhino by pinfall	Six-way Thanksgiving Turkey Bowl match Myers was pinned and forced to wear a turkey suit.	8:13
4	Moose (c) (with Alisha Edwards) defeated Laredo Kid by pinfall	Singles match for the TNA X Division Championship	8:21
5	Steve Maclin defeated Josh Alexander by pinfall	No Disqualification match	23:43
6	The Hardys (Matt Hardy and Jeff Hardy) and Ace Austin defeated Kushida, Zachary Wentz, and Matt Riddle (Note: The match was originally scheduled to be The Hardys and Ace Austin vs. The Rascalz (Trey Miguel and Wentz) and Kushida, but Miguel was unable to appear due to travel issues.) by pinfall	Six-man tag team match	16:04
7	Masha Slamovich (c) defeated Jordynne Grace 2–1	Two out of three falls match for the TNA Knockouts World Championship	19:40
8	Nic Nemeth (c) defeated Eddie Edwards (with Alisha Edwards) by pinfall	Singles match for the TNA World Championship	22:02
(c) / – the champion(s) heading into the match; P / – the match was broadcast on the pre-show
