= TNA Turning Point (2025) =

Professional wrestling event

Turning Point
- Promotion: Total Nonstop Action Wrestling
- Date: November 14, 2025
- City: Winter Park, Florida
- Venue: Full Sail University
- Attendance: 626

TNA+ Monthly Specials chronology
← Previous; Victory Road	Next → Final Resolution

Turning Point chronology
← Previous; 2024	Next → Last

The 2025 Turning Point was a professional wrestling event produced by Total Nonstop Action Wrestling. It took place on November 14, 2025 at Full Sail University in Winter Park, Florida. It aired on TNA+. It was the 20th event under the Turning Point chronology. Wrestlers from WWE's NXT brand, with which TNA has a partnership, also appeared at the event.

Nine matches were contested at the event, including one on the Countdown to Turning Point pre-show. In the main event, TNA International Champion Steve Maclin and Mike Santana defeated TNA World Champion Frankie Kazarian and Nic Nemeth. The event also featured the TNA debut of Mila Moore, the return of Dezmond Xavier, and JDC's first and only Turning Point appearance as an in-ring performer due to his retirement from professional wrestling in 2026.

== Production ==
=== Background ===
Turning Point was a pay-per-view (PPV) event produced by Total Nonstop Action Wrestling between 2004 and 2012. In 2013, TNA discontinued most of its monthly pay-per-view events in favor of the pre-recorded One Night Only events. The event would be held as a special episode of Impact! in 2013, 2015, 2016, and has been a monthly special for Impact Plus in 2019, 2020, 2021, 2023, and 2024.

On October 1, 2025, it was announced that Turning Point will take place on November 14 at the Full Sail University in Winter Park, Florida.

=== Storylines ===
The event featured several professional wrestling matches that involved different wrestlers from pre-existing scripted feuds, plots, and storylines. Wrestlers portrayed heroes, villains, or less distinguishable characters in scripted events that build tension and culminate in a wrestling match or series of matches. Storylines are produced on TNA's weekly program Impact!.

On the August 21 episode of TNA Impact!, Indi Hartwell and Dani Luna competed in a gauntlet match to determine the number one contender to the TNA Knockouts World Championship at Bound for Glory. Luna entered third and eliminated two opponents before facing Hartwell, the fifth entrant. Hartwell would eliminate Luna, but when trying to show her respect, Luna attacked her in frustration. She was briefly calmed down by officials and her former tag team partner Jody Threat, who was the final entrant, but later returned with a steel chair. When Threat tried to talk her down again, Luna struck her, causing a disqualification. Due to this outcome, TNA Director of Authority Santino Marella overturned the result, and a three-way match between Luna, Hartwell, and Threat was set for the September 4 episode which would decide a proper contender; Hartwell would win by pinning Threat. Hartwell and Luna would continue to face each other before and after Bound for Glory, first on the September 18 TNA Impact!, which Hartwell won via disqualification after Luna used a chair. They would meet again on November 13, where Luna again tried to use a chair, but Hartwell would wrestle it away and hit her with it, leading to another disqualification. Once backstage, Hartwell would challenge Luna to a No Disqualification match at Turning Point, which TNA officially announced later that night.

A. J. Francis had been feuding with his former friend, YouTube personality-turned-pro-wrestler BDE, for over a year, stemming from a confrontation between the two at Wrestling Revolver's "Bad Trip" event the previous October. Their rivalry would continue over the next year across the independent circuit, mostly in Wrestling Revolver, including at Tales from The Ring 8, where BDE defeated Francis to win the Revolver Remix Championship. Nine days later, the two would meet at Bound for Glory in the Call Your Shot Gauntlet, where BDE would eliminate Francis. During the November 13 TNA Impact! tapings, BDE confronted Francis, who was hosting his interview segment "Fir$t Cla$$ Penthouse," challenging him to a match at Turning Point. The challenge was accepted, but BDE would unfortunately be put through a table in the process. TNA made the match official later that night.

== Results ==
No.	Results	Stipulations	Times
1^{P}	Jake Something defeated The Home Town Man and Mance Warner by pinfall	Three-way match	7:28
2	Kelani Jordan (c) defeated M by Elegance (with Heather by Elegance and The Personal Concierge) by pinfall	Singles match for the TNA Knockouts World Championship	9:41
3	A. J. Francis defeated BDE by pinfall	Singles match	8:39
4	Indi Hartwell defeated Dani Luna by pinfall	No Disqualification match	14:05
5	The IInspiration (Cassie Lee and Jessie McKay) (c) defeated The Angel Warriors (Léi Yǐng Lee and Xia Brookside) and Mila Moore (Note: Tessa Blanchard was originally scheduled to be Crawford's partner, but was not medically cleared to compete.) and Victoria Crawford by pinfall	Three-way tag team match for the TNA Knockouts World Tag Team Championship	8:30
6	Order 4 (Mustafa Ali, John Skyler, and Jason Hotch) (with Tasha Steelz and Special Agent 0) defeated Cedric Alexander and The Hardys (Jeff Hardy and Matt Hardy) by pinfall	Six-man tag team match	13:34
7	The Rascalz (Trey Miguel, Myron Reed, Zachary Wentz, and Dezmond Xavier) defeated The System (Brian Myers, Eddie Edwards, JDC, and Moose) by pinfall	Eight-man tag team match	14:20
8	Leon Slater (c) defeated Rich Swann by pinfall	Singles match for the TNA X-Division Championship	13:24
9	Steve Maclin and Mike Santana defeated Frankie Kazarian and Nic Nemeth by pinfall	Tag team match	10:33
(c) / – the champion(s) heading into the match; P / – the match was broadcast on the pre-show
