= Impact Wrestling Turning Point (2021) =

2021 Impact Wrestling event

Turning Point (2021)
- Promotional poster
- Promotion: Impact Wrestling
- Date: November 20, 2021
- City: Sunrise Manor, Nevada
- Venue: Sam's Town Live

Impact Plus Monthly Specials chronology
← Previous; Knockouts Knockdown	Next → Throwback Throwdown II

Turning Point chronology
← Previous; 2020	Next → 2023

The 2021 Turning Point was a professional wrestling event produced by Impact Wrestling. It took place on November 20, 2021 at Sam's Town Live in Sunrise Manor, Nevada, and aired on Impact Plus and YouTube. It was the 15th event under the Turning Point chronology, and the first Impact Plus Monthly Special of 2021 to air live since Against All Odds in June.

Eleven matches were contested at the event, including two on the Countdown to Turning Point pre-show. In the main event, Moose defeated Eddie Edwards in a Full Metal Mayhem match to retain the Impact World Championship. In other prominent matches, Mickie James defeated Mercedes Martinez to retain the Impact Knockouts World Championship, The Good Brothers (Doc Gallows and Karl Anderson) defeated Bullet Club (Chris Bey and Hikuleo) to retain the Impact World Tag Team Championship, and Trey Miguel defeated Laredo Kid and Steve Maclin in a three-way match to retain the Impact X Division Championship. The event also marked the Impact debut of Jonah (formerly known as Bronson Reed in NXT).

Turning Point garnered mixed reviews from critics, praising the Austin-Sabin opening bout, the Knockouts World Title match, and the Impact World Title main event, but were critical of Impact Plus' technical issues occurring during the main event.

== Production ==
=== Background ===
Turning Point was a pay-per-view (PPV) event produced by Impact Wrestling (then known as Total Nonstop Action Wrestling) between 2004 and 2012. In 2013, TNA discontinued most of its monthly pay-per-view events in favor of the pre-recorded One Night Only events. The event would be held as a special episode of Impact! in 2013, 2015, 2016, and has been a monthly special for Impact Plus since the 2019 event. On October 4, 2021, Impact announced that Turning Point would be held at Sam's Town Live in Sunrise Manor, Nevada on November 20, 2021.

=== Storylines ===
The event featured several professional wrestling matches, which involve different wrestlers from pre-existing scripted feuds, plots, and storylines. Storylines were produced on Impact's weekly television program.

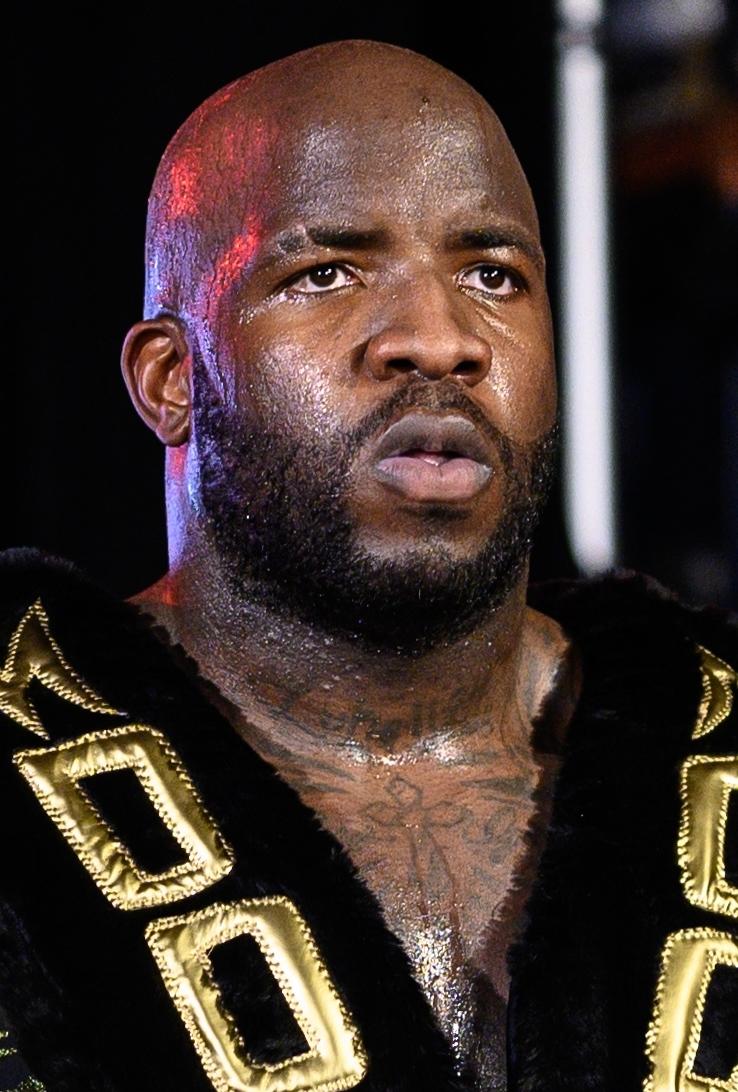
Moose entered Turning Point as Impact World Champion.

At Bound for Glory, Moose last eliminated Matt Cardona to win the Call Your Shot Gauntlet, earning a trophy that he can use for a title match of his choice anytime. That match also featured W. Morrissey - who aligned with Moose for much of the match before being eliminated by him - and Moose's old friend turned rival Eddie Edwards. Later in the night, Josh Alexander defeated Christian Cage to win the Impact World Championship. However, Moose would later attack Alexander and utilize the Call Your Shot Trophy, effectively becoming the new Impact World Champion. The following week on Impact!, a three-way match between Cardona, Morrissey, and Edwards to determine Moose's first challenger. On the November 11 episode of Impact!, Edward would win the match to become the number one contender for the title. On the other hand, Cardona and Morrissey, who feel either one of them deserve a title match, would be booked for a one-on-one match at Turning Point. The following week on Impact!, Moose would attack Edwards during a backstage interview, where they brawled into the arena and battered each other with various weapons. Impact Executive Vice President Scott D'Amore would later come out and announce that the two will face off for the Impact World Championship in a Full Metal Mayhem match.

On the October 21 episode of Impact!, FinJuice (David Finlay and Juice Robinson) and Bullet Club (Chris Bey and Hikuleo) wrestled in a number one contender's match, where the winners would face Impact World Tag Team Champions The Good Brothers (Doc Gallows and Karl Anderson) at Bound for Glory. However, the match ended in a double pinfall, and in a decision made later in the night, Scott D'Amore made the tag title match a three-way at the pay-per-view. At the event, Anderson stole a pin on Bey after Robinson hit him with a frog splash, allowing for The Good Brothers to retain the titles. On the November 4 episode of Impact!, FinJuice and The Good Brothers had their title match end in a no contest, when Bullet Club (Bey, Hikuleo, and El Phantasmo) ran down and attacked both teams with crotch punches. The following week on Impact!, FinJuice and Bullet Club - represented by Bey and Phantasmo - had another number one contender's match, which was won by Bullet Club, who would now face The Good Brothers for the World Tag Team Championship at Turning Point.

On the November 4 episode of Impact!, Laredo Kid won a number one contender's four-way match against Black Taurus, Rohit Raju, and Steve Maclin, earning him a match against Trey Miguel for the Impact X Division Championship at Turning Point. However, Maclin believed that he deserved another opportunity due to he has never been pinned or submitted. Scott D'Amore then booked Maclin in a match against Laredo Kid, where if he won, he would be added to the title match at Turning Point. On the November 18 episode of Impact!, Maclin would defeat Kid, inserting himself into the X Division Championship match with Miguel and Kid at Turning Point.

At Knockouts Knockdown, Mercedes Martinez won the Knockouts Knockdown Tournament to become the number one contender for the Impact Knockouts World Championship. At Bound for Glory, Mickie James defeated Deonna Purrazzo to win the Knockouts World Championship for a fourth time. On the November 4 episode of Impact!, after James made her first successful defense of the title against Madison Rayne, Martinez confronted James and challenged her to a title match at Turning Point.

At Bound for Glory, The IInspiration (Cassie Lee and Jessie McKay) made their Impact debut and defeated Decay (Havok and Rosemary) to win the Impact Knockouts World Tag Team Championship. On the November 4 episode of Impact!, Decay confronted the champions on the set of Madison Rayne's "Locker Room Talk" to invoke their rematch clause, and will face The IInspiration at Turning Point.

At Bound for Glory, after weeks of indecisiveness and silence, Rhino finally broke free from Violent By Design (Eric Young, Deaner, and Joe Doering) and rejoined his old tag team partner Heath. Following Bound for Glory, the two teams continued to wage war with each other, especially after Young revealed he recovered from his knee injury. Heath and Rhino decided to challenge VBD to one more match at Turning Point, which was accepted.

On the Impact! following Bound for Glory, Ace Austin defeated Chris Sabin after interference from Austin's enforcer Madman Fulton. Since then, Austin had been wearing a shirt saying "I Beat Chris Sabin" (much in the same vain as Greg Valentine's "I Broke Wahoo's Leg" and Terry Funk's "Dusty Sucks Eggs" t-shirts). Miffed at Austin parading around in the shirt despite beating him uncleanly, Sabin challenged Austin to a rematch at Turning Point.

== Event ==
Other on-screen personnel
Commentators	Matt Striker
Commentators	D'Lo Brown
Ring announcer	David Penzer
Referees	Brian Hebner
Referees	Brandon Tolle
Referees	Daniel Spencer
Interviewer	Gia Miller

=== Countdown to Turning Point ===
Two matches were contested on the Countdown to Turning Point pre-show. In the first match, FinJuice (David Finlay and Juice Robinson) fought against the team of Raj Singh and Rohit Raju. In the end, FinJuice hit the Doomsday Device to gain the victory.

In the second pre-show match, Jordynne Grace (with Rachael Ellering) defended the Impact Digital Media Championship against Chelsea Green. In the end, Grace set up Green for the electric chair into the "Grace Driver" to win and retain her title.

=== Preliminary matches ===
The opening match of the event was Ace Austin (with Madman Fulton) versus Chris Sabin. The two exchange hammer and wristlocks before Sabin slams Austin twice on the mat and clotheslines him over the top rope. Fulton moves Austin to avoid a dive but the latter gets hit with a kick from Sabin, who then brings Austin back in the ring to hit a top-rope crossbody for two. Austin comes back with a Russian legsweep off the ropes on Sabin, who gets some shots in himself, but gets taken out with a knee strike for two. Austin works on Sabin in the corner, hitting a clothesline and an enzuigiri on the top rope, but Sabin hits a jumping DDT, an enzuigiri, and a missile dropkick to Austin's back. Sabin goes for a "Cradle Shock" attempt but Austin escapes, leading to a German suplex and a modified DDT for a two count. The two exchange kicks before simultaneously taking each other out on the apron. Austin hits another kick and a modified face driver on Sabin for two, backs him into the corner, and lands a top-rope twisting leg drop for another two. Sabin catches Austin on the top-rope and delivers a superplex for a near fall. Fulton distracts the referee to allow Austin to crotch Sabin on the top rope, but his superplex attempt is thwarted and gets put into the Tree of Woe, leading to a hesitation dropkick from Sabin, who then hits a dive onto Fulton on the outside. Fulton throws the "I Beat Chris Sabin" t-shirt in the ring to distract the referee, allowing him to attack Sabin. Austin puts on the shirt, charges at Sabin, but gets caught in the "Cradle Shock" that gives Sabin the win.

Next, a tag team match was contested between Heath and Rhino against Violent By Design (Eric Young and Joe Doering) (with Deaner). Rhino and Doering trade punches with each other and tag in Heath and Young, respectively. Heath gets some strikes onto a tagged in Doering, but gets distracted by Deaner from ringside, who then gets ejected by the referee. Doering and Young tag each other to continue the assault on Heath, the former hitting a forearm and an elbow drop for two. Doering tags Young as he hits a sidewalk slam on Heath, allowing Young to hit a top-rope elbow drop for another two count. Heath avoids an attack from Young, who keeps him from tagging Rhino in the match. Doering tags in to beat down on Heath, who manages to get the tag on Rhino. Rhino goes after a tagged in Young with some clotheslines and a back body drop, absorbs some elbows from Young, and hits a belly-to-belly suplex for two. Rhino goes for the piledriver on Doering, but gets hits with a hockey mask by Young, who gets the pin.

The third match saw Rich Swann (with Willie Mack) against VSK (with Zicky Dice). Swann gets the early advantage on VSK, but misses the senton on the outside. VSK rams Swann into the ring steps and the ramp. Back in the ring, VSK continues the assault on Swann's back, with a hard whip to the corner and a back suplex for two. The two exchange strikes before VSK whips Swann into the corner. Swann gets a sunset flip on VSK for two, who comes back with a tilt-a-whirl backbreaker for another two count. Swann hits a series of punches and a neckbreaker on VSK, then rolls into a splash for a two count. Dice pulls Swann off the apron, then gets clotheslined by Mack. VSK catches Swann with a kick and a modified X-Factor for two. The two trade kicks before VSK hits a backbreaker and a backstabber for another two count. Swann fights back with a cutter and a splash for two, hits another kick and heads up to deliver the "Phoenix Splash" for the win.

The fourth match was Matt Cardona versus W. Morrissey. Morrissey overpowers Cardona early in the match, who takes control after a dropkick to the corner, an enzuigiri that sends Morrissey outside, a basement dropkick and a neckbreaker. Morrissey catches Cardona and swings him into the ring steps. Back in the ring, Morrissey hits a big boot that sends Cardona to the floor, who is able to break the referee's ten count. Morrissey continues the assault on Cardona, who fights back with another dropkick off the middle rope. After hitting a codebreaker for two, Cardona gets faceplanted by Morrissey, who then gets hit with two Reboots that send him outside. Morrissey sends Cardona into the ring post and hits a chokeslam on the apron for a two count. Morrissey knocks Cardona into the referee, but gets hit with "Radio Silence" afterwards. Moose appears and spears Cardona, allowing Morrissey to get the pin.

The fifth match was contested between Decay (Havok and Rosemary) and The IInspiration (Cassie Lee and Jessie McKay) for the Knockouts World Tag Team Championship. Decay immediately attack The IInspirtion at the bell and continue the assault on the ramp and back into the ring. After tagging in and performing a double ripcord on Cassie, Havok gets attacked by The IInspiration with a double stomp and strikes to her arm. Havok breaks the hold, tags in Rosemary who attacks Jessie, but the referee never saw the tag. Rosemary legally gets in the ring and goes after The IInspiration, performing a sling blade on Cassie before sending her into Jessie to hit a splash on both of them, and suplexes the former outside the ring. Rosemary applies a Muta lock on Jessie, who pulls the hair to escape the hold. After a tug of war with Jessie, Cassie tags in and gets a kick on Rosemary, who retaliates with a German suplex into Decay's corner. Havok tags in and performs a double team on Cassie, but only gets a two count. Jessie gets the tag and lures Havok to the outside to pull her into the ring post. Rosemary goes after The IInspiration but gets powerbombed on the floor. Havok hits a Samoan drop on Jessie for two, who fights back by sending her shoulder into the ring post, allows Cassie to attack Havok and let Jessie get the pin with her feet on the ropes, retaining the tag titles for her team.

Next, a three-way match involved Laredo Kid, Steve Maclin and Trey Miguel for the X Division Championship. All three wrestlers begin brawling with each other, with Maclin hitting Miguel with a dive to the outside, before Laredo lands a 450° splash on the former afterwards. Miguel lands a dive over the ring post to Maclin, who retaliates with an uranage back in the ring, followed by a powerbomb off the knee for two. Laredo comes back with a dropkick to Maclin, and hits a neckbreaker that sends him to the outside. Maclin counters a hurricanrana attempt and powerbombs Laredo on the apron. Back in the ring, Miguel goes for a split-legged moonsault but gets caught in the Tree of Woe, leaving him open for Maclin to powerslam Laredo onto him. Miguel and Laredo double team on Maclin, before they both exchange punches and corner moves with each other. Laredo attempts a "Laredo Fly" on Miguel, but lands on Maclin's shoulders and hits a poison rana instead, before going after Miguel to hit the maneuver for a two count. Laredo slams Maclin and goes for another 450° splash, but Maclin gets his knees up and hits "Mayhem For All", but Miguel breaks the pin with a meteora on Maclin. Miguel attempts to pin both wrestlers, with Maclin getting his shoulder up but Laredo didn't, giving Miguel the win and retaining his title.

The seventh match saw Mickie James defend the Knockouts World Championship against Mercedes Martinez. Both wrestlers perform mat-based exchanges and work over each other's arm, before Martinez lands a forearm on James and brawls with her. James hits a snapmare followed by a kick to Martinez for two. James attempts a hurricanrana out of the corner, but Martinez counters it into a Buckle Bomb for two, followed by a Fisherman's buster for another two count. James applies a cross armbreaker on Martinez who escapes out of it, then delivers a few kicks before getting planted with an Air Raid Crash for two. Martinez delivers a half and half suplex on James for two, and hits a Spider German suplex from the top rope for a near fall. Martinez applies a surfboard into a Dragon sleeper, but James blocks it and hits a short DDT. After multiple attempts, James hits a leaping DDT on Martinez to win and retain her title. After the match, Deonna Purrazzo enters the ring and applies an armbar on James, followed by a piledriver. Purrazzo tells James that she wants her Knockouts title back at Hard To Kill.

The penultimate match was The Good Brothers (Doc Gallows and Karl Anderson) defending the Impact World Tag Team Championship against Bullet Club (Chris Bey and Hikuleo). Bey and Anderson lock up and exchange moves, with the former using his agility to land a dropkick on the latter. Hikuleo tags in and works over Anderson, before tagging Bey back in the ring. Anderson drives Bey into his corner to tag Gallows, but Bey manages to tag Hikuleo who goes after Gallows and tags Bey again. Gallows slams Bey and gets sent outside, tags in Anderson who gets distracted by Hikuleo, and gets sent into the ring post. Hikuleo hits a corner splash on Anderson, delivers a running powerslam for two, and tags Bey who applies a headlock on the ground. Anderson lands a spinebuster on Bey, and both wrestlers tag in Gallows and Hikuleo, respectively, who start laying shots onto each other. Bey and Anderson tag in, the former hitting the latter with a top-rope dropkick, and delivers some moves afterwards. Bey goes for the "Art of Finesse" but gets tripped by Gallows from the outside, allowing Anderson to cover Bey for three and retain the tag titles.

Josh Alexander walks into the ring and explains how beating Minoru Suzuki didn't make him happy, Scott D'Amore telling him to "keep his emotions in check", and that he's angry over not challenging for the Impact World Championship. Alexander said that he's going to be in the front row for tonight's main event, and go after Moose to regain his title. Music starts to play and graphics appear on the screen. Jonah, formerly known as Bronson Reed from NXT, makes his Impact debut and attacks Alexander from behind. After Jonah delivers four sentons and a top-rope splash to Alexander, security arrives and they get taken out by him, leaving Alexander to cough up blood from his mouth. Jonah walks up the ramp but goes back into the ring to hit another top-rope splash on Alexander, dipping his finger in Alexander's blood and smearing it on his t-shirt.

=== Main event ===
In the main event, Moose defended the Impact World Championship against Eddie Edwards in a Full Metal Mayhem match. After exchanging forearm strikes and chops with each other, Edwards hits a German suplex that Moose shrugs off, but gets backdropped over the top rope and through a table. Edwards hits Moose with a trash can and brings him back into the ring, but Moose rolls outside and lures Edwards with a cookie sheet, who then retaliates with a dive. After powerbombing Edwards on the entrance ramp, Moose sets him up on the ring apron for a powerbomb through a table, but Edwards blocks it and delivers a Death Valley driver on the apron. Edwards throws a ladder into the ring but gets hit with a pump kick by Moose, who then powerbombs him on the apron and through the timekeeper's table. Moose wraps a chair around Edwards' head and sends him into the ring post. Back in the ring, the two begin climbing a ladder with Edwards hitting Moose with a sunset flip powerbomb through another ladder, but only gets a two count. Edwards wraps a chain around his knee, catches Moose with a spear attempt, and knees away at him before delivering a tiger driver. Moose powerbombs Edwards into a ladder, but answers back with a "Boston Knee Party" for two. After taking each other with kendo stick shots, W. Morrissey enters the ring and takes out Edwards, setting him up to allow Moose to hit the "Lights Out". Matt Cardona arrives to stop the referee's count and brawls with Morrissey at ringside. Edwards begins to cut the ring apron and reveal the wood underneath it. After several back-and-forth counters, Moose hits a low blow on Edwards and delivers a uranage on the exposed wood, followed by a spear for the win to retain his title.

== Reception ==
Steve Cook of 411Mania reviewed the event and gave it a 6 out of 10, which was lower than last year's event that got a 7.5 out of 10. He praised the Austin-Sabin opening bout, the main event (despite the technical issue towards the end) and the surprise Jonah debut, but felt there were "rough spots" in between them, concluding that: "Unfortunately it didn't seem like most stuff hit the next level you'd like to see on a iPPV level event, and technical problems are always a drag, even more so when you're invested in what's going on. These things happen though, we just move on to the next one." Darrin Lilly of PWTorch called it: "[A] decent night of wrestling but nothing that was must-see. The debut of Jonah was a cool surprise and his matches with Josh Alexander should be good. The best matches of the night were Sabin vs. Ace, Mickie vs. Mercedes, and the main event. The timing of the technical glitch [in the main event] was unfortunate." Tommy Martinez of Slam Wrestling gave the event 3 out of 5 stars, initially prepared to rate it lower due to Bey and Hikuleo's inclusion in Bullet Club and the feed cutting out during the Impact World Title bout, but concluded that: "However, there was more good than bad, specifically the Knockouts Title matches (all of them), and Bronson Reed is enjoying his future endeavors at Josh Alexander's expense. Also, the announcement of Ultimate X for the Knockouts title between Mickie James and Deonna Purrazzo? Yes, please."

== Aftermath ==
On the December 2 episode of Impact!, Matt Cardona opened the show to call out Moose, to which the champion would say that Cardona would never become a top star, questioned if he truly wanted to wrestle him, and regarded him as a "mid-carder". Moose and W. Morrissey would go on to attack Cardona before Eddie Edwards ran in to save the latter. Later that night, Edwards and Cardona defeated Moose and Morrissey in a tag team match after Cardona pinned Moose with a roll-up. After the match, Morrissey laid Moose out with a boot, making it clear that he wanted the Impact World Championship match Moose had promised him for weeks. Later, it was announced that Moose will defend the Impact World Championship against Cardona and Morrissey in a three-way match at Hard To Kill.

On the December 9 episode of Impact!, Josh Alexander returns and calls Jonah out to come to the ring, but Impact Executive Vice President Scott D'Amore appeared instead. D'Amore told Alexander that he asked Jonah to stay home because of a situation like this, and announced that Alexander will face Jonah at Hard To Kill.

== Results ==
No.	Results	Stipulations	Times
1^{P}	FinJuice (David Finlay and Juice Robinson) defeated Raj Singh and Rohit Raju by pinfall	Tag team match	8:19
2^{P}	Jordynne Grace (c) (with Rachael Ellering) defeated Chelsea Green by pinfall	Singles match for the Impact Digital Media Championship	8:14
3	Chris Sabin defeated Ace Austin (with Madman Fulton) by pinfall	Singles match	12:58
4	Violent By Design (Eric Young and Joe Doering) (with Deaner) defeated Heath and Rhino by pinfall	Tag team match	7:51
5	Rich Swann (with Willie Mack) defeated VSK (with Zicky Dice) by pinfall	Singles match	6:08
6	W. Morrissey defeated Matt Cardona by pinfall	Singles match	8:54
7	The IInspiration (Cassie Lee and Jessie McKay) (c) defeated Decay (Havok and Rosemary) by pinfall	Tag team match for the Impact Knockouts World Tag Team Championship	10:21
8	Trey Miguel (c) defeated Laredo Kid and Steve Maclin by pinfall	Three-way match for the Impact X Division Championship	8:53
9	Mickie James (c) defeated Mercedes Martinez by pinfall	Singles match for the Impact Knockouts World Championship	9:28
10	The Good Brothers (Doc Gallows and Karl Anderson) (c) defeated Bullet Club (Chris Bey and Hikuleo) by pinfall	Tag team match for the Impact World Tag Team Championship	7:42
11	Moose (c) defeated Eddie Edwards by pinfall	Full Metal Mayhem match for the Impact World Championship	31:34
(c) / – the champion(s) heading into the match; P / – the match was broadcast on the pre-show
