= Turning (disambiguation) =

Turning is a machining process in which a cutting tool describes a helical toolpath by moving within a plane while the workpiece rotates.

Turning or The Turning may also refer to:

== Film ==
- Turning (2002 film), a Russian drama film
- Turning (2012 film), documentary art film by Charles Atlas
- The Turning (1992 film), an American film
- The Turning (2013 film), an Australian film based on Tim Winton short stories
- The Turning (2020 film), a film adaptation of The Turn of the Screw by Henry James

== Music ==
- Turning, soundtrack album for Charles Atlas film by Antony and the Johnsons
- Turning, an album by Suzanne Ciani
- The Turning (album), a 1987 album by Sam Phillips
- "The Turning", a song by Oasis from the album Dig Out Your Soul

== Other media ==
- The Turning (short story collection), a collection of short stories by Tim Winton
- The Turning (play), by Bill McCluskey

== See also ==
- Turning Point (disambiguation)
