= TNA Turning Point (2009) =

2009 Total Nonstop Action Wrestling pay-per-view event

Turning Point (2009)
- Promotional poster featuring A.J. Styles
- Promotion: Total Nonstop Action Wrestling
- Date: November 15, 2009
- City: Orlando, Florida
- Venue: Impact Zone
- Attendance: 1,100

Pay-per-view chronology
← Previous; Bound for Glory	Next → Final Resolution

Turning Point chronology
← Previous; 2008	Next → 2010

The 2009 Turning Point was a professional wrestling pay-per-view (PPV) event produced by the Total Nonstop Action Wrestling (TNA) promotion, which took place on November 15, 2009 at the Impact Zone in Orlando, Florida. It was the sixth event under the Turning Point chronology.

== Storylines ==
Other on-screen personnel
Role:	Name:
Commentator	Mike Tenay
Commentator	Taz
Interviewer	Jeremy Borash
Interviewer	Lauren Thompson
Ring announcer	Jeremy Borash
Ring announcer	David Penzer
Referee	Earl Hebner
Referee	Rudy Charles
Referee	Mark Johnson
Referee	Andrew Thomas
Referee	Jamie Tucker

Turning Point featured eight professional wrestling matches that involved different wrestlers from pre-existing scripted feuds and storylines. Wrestlers were portrayed as villains, heroes, or less distinguishable characters in the scripted events that built tension and culminated into a wrestling match or series of matches.

== Results ==
No.	Results	Stipulations	Times
1	Amazing Red (c) (with Don West) defeated Homicide	Singles match for the TNA X Division Championship	10:08
2	ODB (Women's Knockout), Sarita and Taylor Wilde (Knockouts Tag Team) defeated The Beautiful People (Lacey Von Erich, Madison Rayne and Velvet Sky)	Six-Knockout tag team match for the TNA Women's Knockout Championship and the TNA Knockouts Tag Team Championship	05:54
3	The British Invasion (Brutus Magnus and Doug Williams) (c) defeated The Motor City Machine Guns (Alex Shelley and Chris Sabin) and Beer Money, Inc. (James Storm and Robert Roode)	Three-way tag team match for the TNA World Tag Team Championship	10:20
4	Tara defeated Awesome Kong	Six Sides of Steel match	07:53
5	Team 3D (Brother Devon and Brother Ray) and Rhino defeated D'Angelo Dinero, Hernandez and Matt Morgan	Six-man tag team match	14:27
6	Scott Steiner defeated Bobby Lashley	Falls Count Anywhere match	11:27
7	Kurt Angle defeated Desmond Wolfe by submission	Singles match	16:21
8	A.J. Styles (c) defeated Daniels and Samoa Joe	Three-way match for the TNA World Heavyweight Championship	21:50
(c) / – the champion(s) heading into the match

== Reception ==
In 2021, the promotion’s viewers ranked the Styles vs. Daniels vs. Samoa Joe match as the Nº1 of the Top 10 World Title Matches.
