= TNA Turning Point (2012) =

2012 Total Nonstop Action Wrestling pay-per-view event

Turning Point (2012)
- Turning Point poster featuring a member of Aces & Eights (Wes Brisco)
- Promotion: Total Nonstop Action Wrestling
- Date: November 11, 2012
- City: Orlando, Florida
- Venue: Impact Zone
- Attendance: 1,100

Pay-per-view chronology
← Previous; Bound for Glory	Next → Final Resolution

TNA Turning Point chronology
← Previous; 2011	Next → 2013

The 2012 Turning Point was a professional wrestling pay-per-view event produced by Total Nonstop Action Wrestling that took place on November 11, 2012 at the Impact Wrestling Zone in Orlando, Florida. It was the ninth annual Turning Point event and the final one to be broadcast on pay-per-view.

Eight matches were featured on the card. In the main event Jeff Hardy defeated Austin Aries in a Ladder match to retain the TNA World Heavyweight Championship. In other prominent matches, James Storm defeated AJ Styles and Bobby Roode in a triple threat match to determine the #1 contender to the TNA World Heavyweight Championship, Kurt Angle defeated Devon, and in the opening contest, Samoa Joe defeated Magnus in a No Disqualification match to retain the TNA World Television Championship.

In October 2017, with the launch of the Global Wrestling Network, the event became available to stream on demand.

== Storylines ==
Other on-screen personnel
Commentator	Mike Tenay
Commentator	Taz
Ring announcer	Jeremy Borash
Referee	Rudy Charles
Referee	Mark "Slick" Johnson
Referee	Andrew Thomas
Interviewers	Jeremy Borash

Turning Point featured eight professional wrestling matches involved different wrestlers from pre-existing scripted feuds and storylines. Wrestlers portrayed villains, heroes, or less distinguishable characters in the scripted events that built tension and culminated in a wrestling match or series of matches.

The primary altercation spotlighted at Turning Point involved Austin Aries and defending champion Jeff Hardy, and their continued feud over the TNA World Heavyweight Championship. With the result of Aries losing the championship to Hardy at Bound for Glory, on the October 18 edition of Impact Wrestling, Aries joined in on Hardy's victory celebration, where Hardy introduced a personalized version of the TNA World Title slightly differing from his first version introduced after his Bound for Glory 2010 title victory. Aries congratulated Hardy for dethroning him for the title, promptly reminding Hardy that he was now a target and stating his intention to waive his rematch clause whenever he saw fit. After Hardy referred to his face designed on his personalized belt as the face Aries couldn't beat, Aries spat on Hardy's title, erupting a brawl which Aries eventually receded from. The following week after Hardy's successful title defense over Kurt Angle, Aries attacked Hardy and announced that they would compete for the title in a rematch at Turning Point before taking possession of the legitimate TNA title belt that Hardy also sported. The next week, Aries claimed Hardy had knocked him off the top of the company after fighting his way to get there and would resume his position at the top; however, Hardy retorted by pulling out a ladder, climbing it to the top, and challenging Aries to a Ladder match at the PPV.

A feud entering Turning Point was Kurt Angle seeking revenge against Devon. At Bound for Glory, Devon was unmasked and revealed as a major member of the Aces & Eights during a night that the group won "full access" to the promotion. On the following Impact Wrestling episode, Devon highlighted his reasons for joining which included his group mates, a contract dispute, the unknown leader who got him in, and Bully Ray's past ill-will towards him and his kids. Aces & Eights then targeted a member of the TNA roster the next week, throwing a dart at a board showing a collage of wrestlers. The target was revealed at the end of the night during a group-on-one attack led by Devon on their victim, Kurt Angle.

Another main match featured on the card had James Storm, A.J. Styles, and Bobby Roode competing over contention to the TNA World Heavyweight Championship. Seeking to become the number one contender, on the October 25 edition of Impact Wrestling, Kurt Angle, James Storm, Bully Ray, and Mr. Anderson brought their case to TNA General Manager Hulk Hogan on why they deserved to have a shot at the TNA World Title, with Hogan's choice boiling down to either Angle or Storm after eliminations; Hogan ultimately chose Angle, but told Storm he had a plan for him. The following week, Bobby Roode voiced his complaints about being omitted from the championship hunt even after a clause that prohibited him to compete for the title as long as Aries was champion had expired with Aries' title loss. A.J. Styles interrupted telling Roode that he had no place to whine for being the longest reigning TNA World Heavyweight Champion in history compared to Styles' year of dealing with unrelated issues. Styles then called out Roode to a fight who refused, but after Roode took a cheap shot and a scuffle between the two ensued, Hogan came out and scheduled Styles, Storm, and Roode in a Three-Way match at Turning Point with special stipulations that whoever got pinned would be banned from getting World Title shots until Bound for Glory 2013, while whoever won the match would become the contender to the title.

A tag team feud stirred between Christopher Daniels and Kazarian and defending champions Chavo Guerrero Jr. and Hernandez over the TNA World Tag Team Championship. At Bound for Glory, Chavo Guerrero and Hernandez defeated champions Christopher Daniels and Kazarian and A.J Styles and Kurt Angle to win the TNA World Tag Team Championship. Daniels and Kazarian, upset over getting left out of the Championship Thursday October 25 edition of Impact Wrestling, came out to the ring to racially berate Guerrero and Hernandez and criticize Guerrero for clinging to his family name for support, claiming TNA President Dixie Carter was desperate about appeasing the Hispanic demographic and labeled Guerrero and Hernandez as "Dos Stereotypicos". These statements brought out Guerrero and Hernandez. Presuming the Daniels and Kazarian wanted their rematch, Guerrero and Hernandez granted it to them by signing their fan petition following a brawl. The next week during the Open Fight Night edition of Impact Wrestling, Daniels and Kazarian declared that they would face Guerrero and Hernandez at Turning Point and heated up the feud by calling out and beating down Spanish announcers Hector Guerrero and Willie Urbina before Chavo Guerrero and Hernandez made the save.

Aces & Eights held storyline attorney Joseph Park captive under abusive conditions due to his association with TNA General Manager Hulk Hogan, using Park to ultimately get Hogan and Sting in their clubhouse. Held for ransom, Hogan and Sting made a deal with the group that if they release Park, they'd give them a chance to earn contracts if they beat Sting and a partner of his choosing (which turned out to be Bully Ray) at Bound for Glory. At Bound for Glory, Park, who was escorted to the match, restrained, and insulted by the Aces & Eights, broke free in uncontrollable anger and attacked the clan following their victory. Over the next set of Impact Wrestling episodes, Park asked Hogan for a match with a member of the rebel gang, mentioning his hold harmless clause as a non-wrestler and that zero liability would be held for what happens, which Hogan stated he would consider. Feeling his basic civil rights were violated, Park felt the need to stand up as a man and challenged a member of the group through a loophole in the Open Fight Night concept. During his match with Devon, and interference from Aces & Eights, Park was able to unmask a member who was later identified as D.O.C. Because of this achievement, and support from his former enemy Bully Ray who had gained respect for him, Hogan eventually gave into Park's request.

Joey Ryan called out TNA X Division Champion Rob Van Dam on Open Fight Night, winning a non-title match with help from his ally Matt Morgan at ringside. After the match, Morgan attacked Van Dam with his Carbon Footprint finishing move. This set up another match at Turning Point between Ryan and Van Dam for the title.

Samoa Joe and Magnus proceeded to feud over the TNA Television Championship. At Bound for Glory, Samoa Joe defeated Magnus to retain the title. On the November 1 edition of Impact Wrestling, Magnus called out Samoa Joe for a TV Title match, however, Joe won the match after Magnus got himself disqualified using a weapon on Joe. Joe later requested a rematch with no rules and threatened Magnus. The next week, a No Disqualification match was announced for Turning Point.

Without the presence of her storyline husband Eric Young, ODB commenced feuding with Tara and her Hollywood boyfriend, Jessie Godderz, exchanging wins, losses, and beat downs throughout the weeks. Irritated with Young's entire absence, ODB informed Young over the phone that they would face Tara and Godderz at Turning Point.

== Results ==
No.	Results	Stipulations	Times
1	Samoa Joe (c) defeated Magnus by technical knockout	No Disqualification match for the TNA Television Championship	12:29
2	ODB and Eric Young defeated Jesse and Tara	Mixed tag team match	05:42
3	Rob Van Dam (c) defeated Joey Ryan	Singles match for the TNA X Division Championship	07:04
4	D.O.C. defeated Joseph Park	Singles match	09:34
5	Hernandez and Chavo Guerrero (c) defeated Bad Influence (Christopher Daniels and Kazarian)	Tag team match for the TNA World Tag Team Championship	11:57
6	James Storm defeated A.J. Styles and Bobby Roode	Three-way match to determine the #1 contender to the TNA World Heavyweight Championship (Note: Since Styles was pinned, he was not eligible to compete for the TNA World Heavyweight Championship until Bound for Glory 2013.)	16:38
7	Kurt Angle defeated Devon by submission	Singles match	12:36
8	Jeff Hardy (c) defeated Austin Aries	Ladder match for the TNA World Heavyweight Championship	21:01
(c) / – the champion(s) heading into the match

== See also ==
- 2012 in professional wrestling
