= TNA Turning Point (2005) =

2005 Total Nonstop Action Wrestling pay-per-view event

Turning Point (2005)
- The promotional poster for the event featuring Team 3D (Brother Devon (left) and Brother Ray (right))
- Promotion: Total Nonstop Action Wrestling (TNA)
- Date: December 11, 2005
- City: Orlando, Florida
- Venue: TNA Impact! Zone
- Attendance: 900

Pay-per-view chronology
← Previous; Genesis	Next → Final Resolution

Turning Point chronology
← Previous; 2004	Next → 2006

The 2005 Turning Point was a professional wrestling pay-per-view (PPV) event produced by the Total Nonstop Action Wrestling (TNA). It took place on December 11, 2005 at the TNA Impact! Zone in Orlando, Florida. It was the second event under the Turning Point name and the twelfth and final event of the 2005 TNA PPV schedule. Nine professional wrestling matches and one pre-show match were featured on the event's card, two of which featured championships.

The main event at Turning Point was for the NWA World Heavyweight Championship, in which then-champion Jeff Jarrett was pitted against the challenger Rhino. Jarrett won the match to retain the title. A.J. Styles defended the TNA X Division Championship against Samoa Joe at the event. Joe defeated Styles to become the new champion. Team 3D (Brother Devon and Brother Ray) fought America's Most Wanted (Chris Harris and James Storm; AMW) in a Tag Team Elimination Tables match at the event, which Team 3D won. TNA held the first-ever Barbed Wire Massacre at Turning Point between Abyss and Sabu. Sabu was the victor in the contest. Christian Cage defeated Monty Brown also at the event.

Turning Point is remembered for the first-ever Barbed Wire Massacre, the announcement of TNA's signing of the wrestler Sting, and Samoa Joe's title win which was ranked by TNA as the 34th greatest moment in the company's history. Bob Kapur of the professional wrestling section of the Canadian Online Explorer rated the show a 7 out of 10, as he had for the 2004 installment.

== Production ==
=== Background ===
The second installment in the TNA Turning Point chronology was announced in September 2005. The date for the show was revealed in late-September on TNA's official website as December 11, with it to be held at the TNA Impact! Zone in Orlando, Florida. A promotional poster for the event was released by TNA featuring Team 3D (Brother Devon and Brother Ray). A thirty-minute pre-show was slotted to take place prior to the telecast featuring one wrestling match. TNA advertised that a major announcement would take place at Turning Point that would "change the face of TNA in 2006".

=== Storylines ===
Turning Point featured nine professional wrestling matches and one pre-show match that involved different wrestlers from pre-existing scripted feuds and storylines. Wrestlers portrayed villains, heroes, or less distinguishable characters in the scripted events that built tension and culminated in a wrestling match or series of matches.

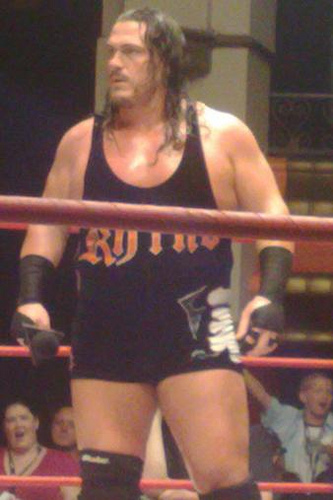
Rhino (pictured) challenged Jeff Jarrett for the NWA World Heavyweight Championship at Turning Point.

The main event at Turning Point was for the NWA World Heavyweight Championship, in which then-champion Jeff Jarrett defended against the challenger Rhino. The storyline behind this match began at TNA's Bound for Glory PPV event on October 23, 2005, where Jarrett was to defend the title against Kevin Nash. However, Nash was rushed to the hospital the night before and was not cleared to wrestle. Rhino took Nash's place in the match, where he defeated Jarrett to win the NWA World Heavyweight Championship. Later, Jarrett reclaimed the title on the November 3, 2005 episode of TNA's television program TNA Impact!. This led to a Six-Man Tag Team match pitting the team of Rhino and Team 3D (Brother Devon and Brother Ray) against the team of Jarrett and America's Most Wanted (Chris Harris and James Storm; AMW) at TNA's Genesis PPV event on November 13, 2005. Rhino and Team 3D were the victors of the encounter. A rematch between Rhino and Jarrett for the title was announced on the November 19, 2005 episode of Impact! for Turning Point. TNA aired a series of video packages focusing on Rhino and his title match heading into the show.

The TNA X Division Championship was also defended at Turning Point, with then-champion A.J. Styles facing Samoa Joe. This rivalry started at TNA's Sacrifice PPV event held on August 14, 2005, where Joe defeated Styles in the final round of the 2005 TNA Super X Cup Tournament. By winning the tournament, Joe was entitled to a TNA X Division Championship match against then-champion Christopher Daniels. Daniels had interfered in the match, leading to Joe's victory. As a result, Styles was added to Joe's title match with Daniels, making it a Three-way match at TNA's Unbreakable PPV event held on September 11, 2005. Styles won the bout at Unbreakable becoming the new champion, thus leading to a defense against Daniels at Bound for Glory in a Thirty-Minute Iron Man match which Styles also won.

Styles went on to defend the championship against Petey Williams, while Daniels and Joe competed in a Four-on-Four Tag Team Elimination X match at Genesis. Styles retained the title at the event, while Daniels and Joe's team were the victors in their contest. After Daniels and Joe won their match, Joe assaulted Daniels by bashing him over the head with a steel chair and slamming him on a steel chair back-first. Daniels was sidelined with an injury in the storyline as a result of these action. Thereafter, Joe proceeded to carry around a blood stained towel from the attack. Joe's action at Genesis angered Styles in the storyline, as Styles accused Joe of violating the unwritten code of the TNA X Division. Styles followed by challenging Joe to a match at Turning Point for the TNA X Division Championship on the November 19, 2005 episode of Impact!, which Joe accepted. On the December 3, 2005 episode of Impact!, Joe attacked Styles, claiming he did not care about the X Division code.

Team 3D fought AMW in a Tag Team Elimination Tables match at Turning Point. The storyline behind this match began on the October 8, 2005 episode of Impact! where AMW and Jeff Jarrett violently assaulted Team 3D leaving them covered with blood. Afterwards, Team 3D were not seen due to a scripted injury, with Jarrett, AMW, and Team Canada (A-1, Bobby Roode, Eric Young, Petey Williams, and Coach Scott D'Amore) hosting a segment where they buried Team 3D's careers on the October 15, 2005 episode of Impact!. Team 3D made their return from injury at Bound for Glory, attacking Jarrett and AMW. At Genesis, Team 3D teamed with Rhino to defeat AMW and Jarrett in a Six-Man Tag Team match. A Tables match between Team 3D and AMW was announced on the November 19, 2005 episode of Impact! to take place at the show.

The number-one contender to the NWA World Heavyweight Championship was determined at Turning Point, with Christian Cage being pitted against Monty Brown. At Genesis, Brown defeated Jeff Hardy to become number-one contender to the NWA World Heavyweight Championship. Also at Genesis, Christian Cage made his debut in the company, proclaiming he came to TNA to win the NWA World Heavyweight Championship. On the November 19, 2005 episode of Impact!, Cage reiterated his statement from Genesis, which angered Brown in the storyline. Brown said that Cage would have to go through him in order to get a title shot before the segment resulted in a fight between the two. Cage requested the match against Brown from NWA Championship Committee member Larry Zbyszko on the November 26, 2005 episode of Impact!, which he was granted.

TNA held the first-ever Barbed Wire Massacre at Turning Point between Abyss and Sabu. This match was the result of a long-standing rivalry between the two that began at Unbreakable. There, Abyss defeated Sabu in a No Disqualification match. Abyss and Sabu competed in a Monster's Ball match at Bound for Glory alongside Jeff Hardy and Rhino, which Rhino won. At Genesis, Abyss defeated Sabu in another No Disqualification match. TNA advertised the Barbed Wire Massacre between Abyss and Sabu on the November 19, 2005 episode of Impact!. The reasoning behind the match stipulation had to do with Abyss fearing barbed wire in the storyline. Abyss challenged this fear on the December 3 episode of Impact!, by bashing Sabu over the head with a barbed wire wrapped steel chair.

== Event ==
Other on-screen personnel
Role:	Name:
Commentator	Mike Tenay
Commentator	Don West
Ring announcer	Jeremy Borash
Referee	Rudy Charles
Referee	Mark "Slick" Johnson
Referee	Andrew Thomas
Interviewers	Jeremy Borash
Interviewers	Shane Douglas

=== Pre-Show ===
Prior to Turning Point, TNA held a thirty-minute pre-show. During the broadcast, the team of Lance Hoyt and The Naturals (Andy Douglas and Chase Stevens) faced the team of Buck Quartermain, Jon Bolen and Joe Doering in a Six Man Tag Team match that last 7 minutes and 11 seconds. Hoyt pinned Bolen after dropping Bolen face-first with his signature Blackoutmaneuver.

=== Miscellaneous ===
Turning Point featured employees other than the wrestlers involved in the matches. Mike Tenay, Don West, and Bobby Heenan (for the Basebrawl only) were the commentators for the telecast. Jeremy Borash was the ring announcer for the event. Andrew Thomas, Rudy Charles, and Mark "Slick" Johnson participated as referees for the encounters. Shane Douglas handled the interview duties during the show. Besides employees who appeared in a wrestling role, Major League Baseball (MLB) outfielder Johnny Damon, James Mitchell, Traci, Larry Zbyszko, Cassidy Riley, Coach Scott D'Amore, and MLB catcher A. J. Pierzynski all appeared on camera, either in backstage or ringside segments.

=== Preliminary matches ===
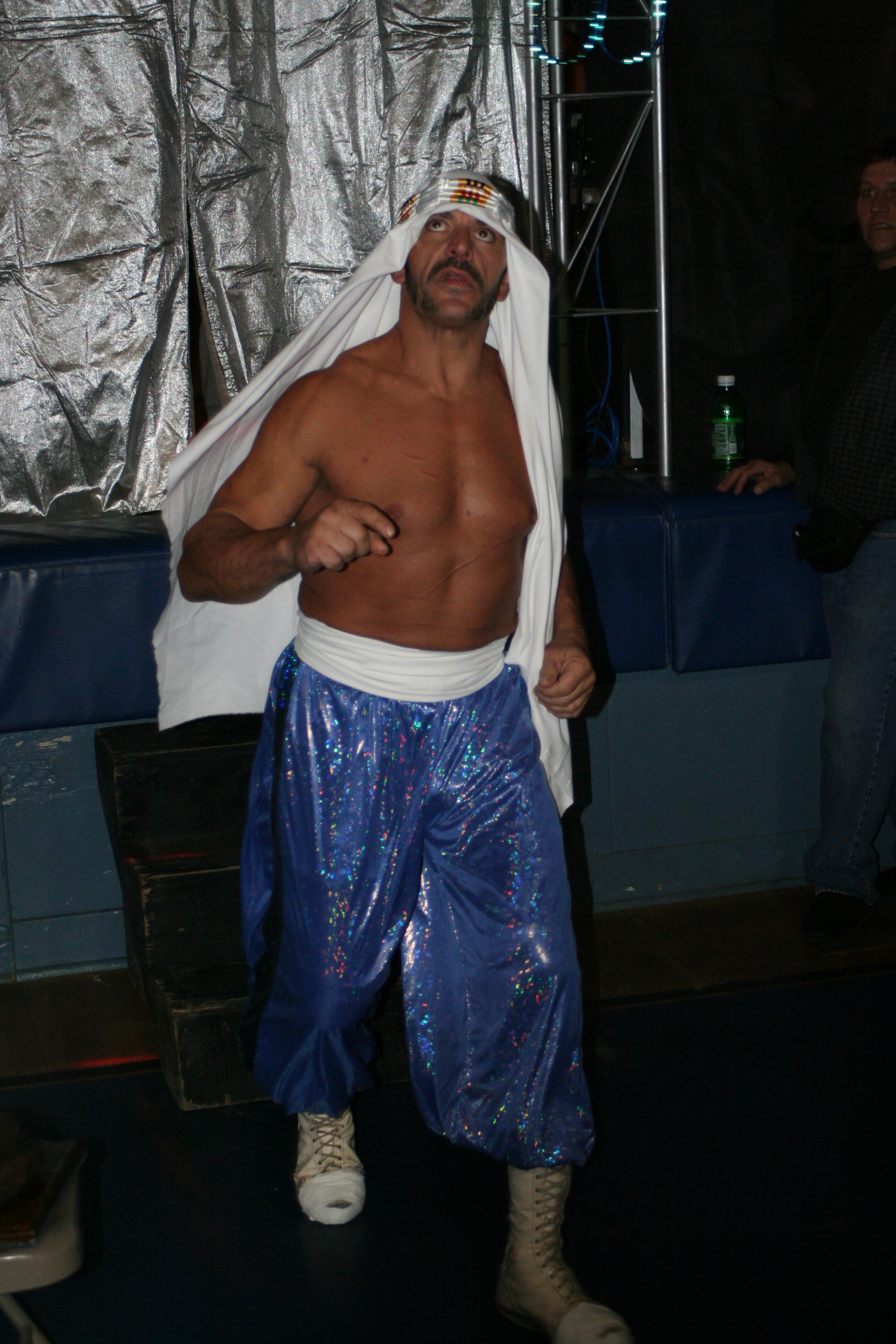
Sabu (pictured) fought Abyss in a Barbed Wire Massacre at Turning Point.

The show opened with Sabu versus Abyss in the (first-ever) "Barbed Wire Massacre", in which the ring ropes were replaced with barbed wire, and the only way to win was by pinfall or submission. James Mitchell accompanied Abyss to the ring. The duration of the contest was 10 minutes and 59 seconds. Early in the bout Sabu was pushed face-first into the barbed wire ropes as a result of Abyss kicking out of a pin attempt. Later, Abyss lifted up and dropped Sabu face-first into the barbed wire ropes. After this Sabu used a sharp weapon, which he had hidden under his belt, to stab Abyss in the arm repeatedly. Abyss was next to fall into the barbed wire after Sabu tripped him as he ran. A barbed wire wrapped steel was introduced in the match, which Sabu used to bash Abyss over the head. A barbed wire covered board was pushed into the ring after this by Sabu, which Abyss used to lift up and drop Sabu on. Another barbed wire covered board was introduced following this, with Sabu causing Abyss to run into it. He then pushed Abyss onto the other one and covered him for the pin to win the encounter.

The team of Austin Aries and Matt Bentley fought the team of Alex Shelley and Roderick Strong in the next match, spanning 8 minutes and 4 seconds. Bentley was accompanied by Traci to the ring. Bentley won the match for his team by pinning Shelley after kicking him in the face.

The third match of the show was between Raven and Chris K. This match occurred because Raven refused to quit the company, which was something NWA Championship Committee member Larry Zbyszko had requested in the storyline. Raven pinned Chris K after slamming Chris K's head into the mat with his signature Raven Effect DDT maneuver at 5 minutes and 45 seconds in.

Next, Team Canada (A-1, Bobby Roode, Eric Young, and Petey Williams) were pitted against the 4Live Kru (B.G. James, Kip James, Konnan, and Ron Killings) in an Eight-Man Tag Team match. Coach Scott D'Amore accompanied Team Canada to the ring. The duration of the encounter was 7 minutes and 18 seconds. Despite the match being contested under disqualifications and count-outs, Konnan used his shoe as a weapon during the match. Roode won the bout for his team by pinning Kip after Konnan betrayed his teammates and bashed Kip over the head with a steel chair. After the match, Konnan also bashed B.G. over the head with the chair before leaving the ring.

TNA held a Six Man Tag Team match in which the team of Chris Sabin, Sonjay Dutt, and Dale Torborg faced The Diamonds in the Rough (David Young, Elix Skipper, and Simon Diamond). This was promoted as a "Basebrawl", since Torborg was a baseball coach and MLB catcher. A. J. Pierzynski accompanied Sabin, Dutt, and Torborg to the ring. Near the end of the match, Pierzynski pulled the referee out of the ring as he was counting a pin for Diamond. This led to announcer Bobby Heenan characterizing Pierzynski's actions to the referee as ignorance, while Johnny Damon handed Pierzynski a home plate. Pierzynski then entered the ring and bashed Diamond over the head with it. Sabin then slammed Diamond neck-first into the mat with his signature Cradle Shock maneuver, while Dutt followed by performing his signature Hindu Press aerial maneuver against Diamond. Dutt then pinned Diamond at 7 minutes and 57 seconds in, to win the bout for his team.

=== Main event matches ===
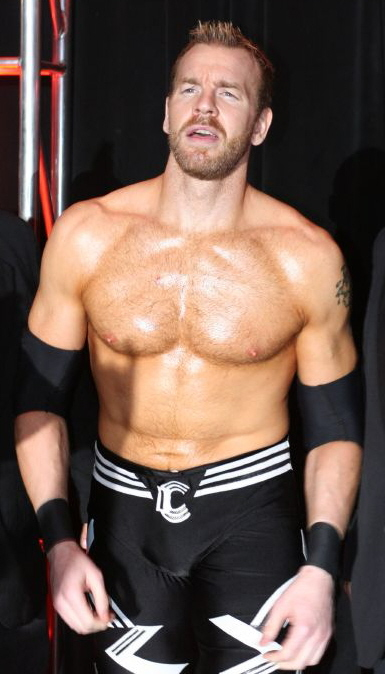
Christian Cage made his TNA pay-per view debut defeating Monty Brown at Turning Point.

Christian Cage fought Monty Brown next to determine the number-one contender to the NWA World Heavyweight Championship. This bout lasted 12 minutes and 32 seconds. In the beginning the two fought at ringside, until Cage jumped from the top of a padded turnbuckle onto Brown with an aerial splash. After this, Cage removed the padding from one of the turnbuckles. Brown gained a two-count on Cage after slamming him against the mat with his signature Alpha Bomb maneuver and covered for the pin, but the referee had a delayed reaction. Later, Cage caused Brown to run into the exposed turnbuckle, he then followed by forcing Brown's face into the mat with his signature Unprettier maneuver. He then pinned Brown to become the number-one contender to the NWA World Heavyweight Championship.

The seventh match of the event was a Tag Team Elimination Tables match between Team 3D (Brother Devon and Brother Ray) and America's Most Wanted (Chris Harris and James Storm; AMW). In this type of match, there are no disqualifications and no count-outs, with the only way to win being to eliminate both members of the other team by forcing them through a table. Storm was the first eliminated, with Team 3D using AMW's signature Death Sentence tag team maneuver to drive him through a table back-first. Harris was the next eliminated, with Team 3D performing their signature 3D tag team maneuver on the entrance ramp, forcing Harris through the table face-first. With Harris eliminated at 9 minutes and 40 seconds, Team 3D were named the victors of the encounter.

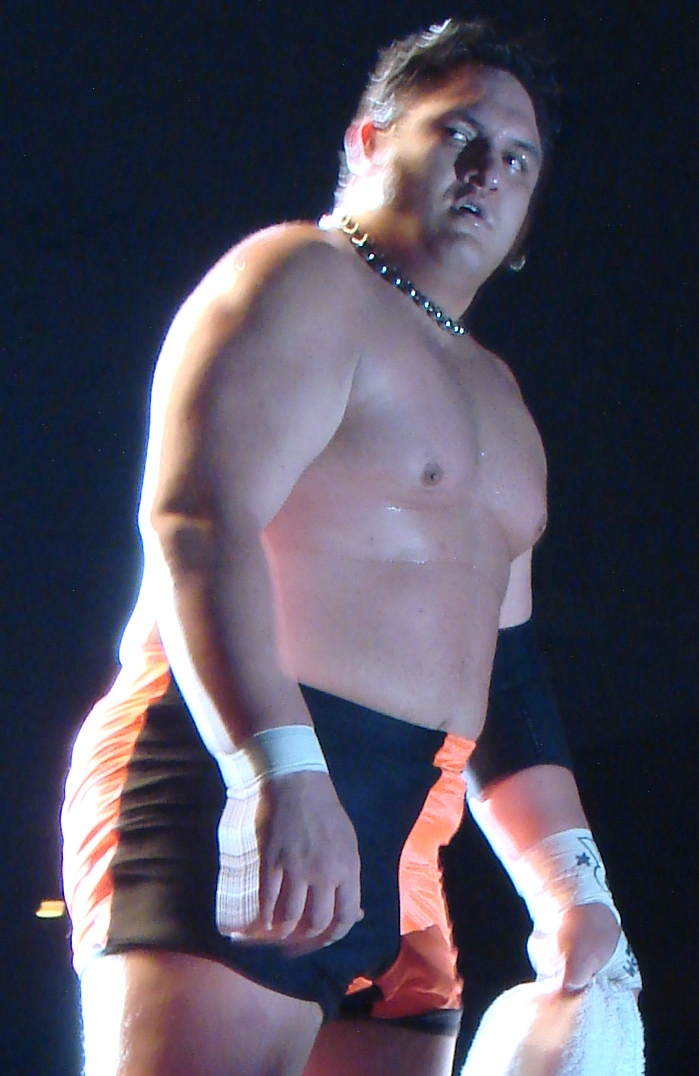
Samoa Joe (pictured) defeated A.J. Styles to win the TNA X Division Championship at Turning Point.

The TNA X Division Championship was defended by A.J. Styles against Samoa Joe next. Styles' mouth was busted open during the bout. The two wrestlers fought at ringside during the opening minutes before entering the ring. Back in the ring Joe and Styles fought back and forth with each trading near-falls. Finally, Styles slammed Joe face-first into the mat with his signature Styles Clash maneuver. Joe kicked out of the following pin, leading to an exchange which allowed Joe to place Styles in his signature Coquina Clutch submission hold. After a brief period of time, Styles passed out and the referee awarded Joe the victory and thus became the new TNA X Division Champion at 18 minutes and 58 seconds in. After the match, Joe bashed Styles in the face with the TNA X Division Championship belt and then set up to slam him on a steel chair in the ring but was foiled by Christopher Daniels coming to Styles' defense. A brawl ensued between Joe and Daniels, leading to security breaking it up.

The main event was for the NWA World Heavyweight Championship, in which then-champion Jeff Jarrett defended against the challenger Rhino. The duration of the match was 17 minutes and 30 seconds. Jarrett was busted open during the contest. Despite this being a standard wrestling match, Jarrett and Rhino used weapons throughout and primarily fought outside of the ring. Jarrett hit Rhino with a chair while the two stood on a scaffolding, causing Rhino to fall off and crash through a table. Rhino attempted to tackle Jarrett through a table set up on the entrance ramp. He succeeded, but the table did not break. Team Canada interfered afterwards, trying to stop Rhino from getting to the ring before the referee counted both Rhino and Jarrett out. They failed as Rhino came rushing back into the ring before the count finished. Jarrett pinned Rhino after slamming Rhino face-first with his signature Stroke maneuver onto several steel chairs. As such, Jarrett retained the NWA World Heavyweight Championship. After the title match, the lights went off with the logo of the wrestler Sting appearing on the screens in the arena, thus being the major announcement advertised for the show.

== Reception ==
A total of 900 people attended Turning Point. Canadian Online Explorer writer Bob Kapur rated the entire event a 7 out of 10, which was the same rating he had given to the 2004 installment. It was higher than the 6.5 out of ten the 2006 event was given by Chris Sokol. The Turning Point ranking was lower than Genesis' rating, which received an 8 out of 10 from Corey David Lacroix. TNA's next PPV event, Final Resolution, was ranked lower than Turning Point; it received a rating of 6.5 out of 10 from Kapur. Compared to rival World Wrestling Entertainment's (WWE) Armageddon PPV event, Turning Point was ranked higher as Armageddon was given a 6.5 out of 10 by Chris Sokol.

The highest rating given by Kapur went to the TNA X Division Championship bout, with a 9 out of 10. The Barbed Wire Massacre received an 8 out of 10, while the Christian Cage versus Monty Brown and the Tables match were both rated 7 out of 10. The lowest rating assessed was a 6 out of 10, given to the main event and several other matches on the card.

James Caldwell of the Pro Wrestling Torch Newsletter reviewed the same and stated he felt the main event involved the "usual shortcuts," the "usual outside interference," the "usual illogical finish," and the "usual compromise of rules." Though Caldwell commented that he could not say the "match wasn't exciting, because it was." When discussing the Cage versus Brown bout, Caldwell said it "never reached a second gear." Caldwell said the Barbed Wire Massacre was "well developed" but was "below expectations." Regarding the Tables match, Caldwell believed that Team 3D were not "mentally prepared for the match." He also said that TNA should "demand a better return on investment when Team 3D can’t show up to the PPV in a decent shape to wrestle." He also discussed the TNA X Division Championship bout, commenting that it was "state of the art" and that "the two men saved a downer PPV with an outstanding performance." He praised Joe's performance saying that "Joe is the most dynamic wrestler the company has," and that his character was "TNA’s ticket to success."

TNA released a DVD counting down the top 50 moments in their history in 2007, with Joe's X Division Champion victory ranking at number 34 on the compilation.

== Aftermath ==
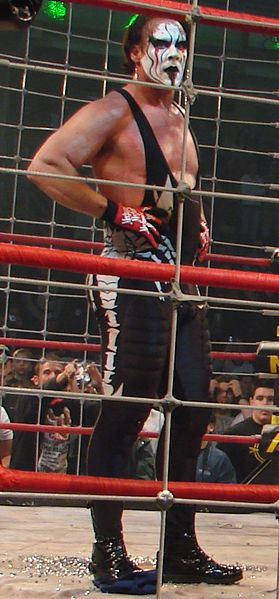
Sting (pictured) debuted at TNA's Final Resolution PPV event.

Several wrestlers were injured at the show. Abyss suffered several serious cuts to his left arm, while Sabu had cuts on his arms, legs, and face. Both wrestlers required several stitches after their match. A.J. Styles busted his lip during his title defense, requiring stitches, while Samoa Joe dislocated his jaw. Raven busted his lip but no stitches were required. Jeff Jarrett suffered a bad cut to his forehead during the main event. Lastly, James Storm was diagnosed with a neck stinger.

The BaseBrawl bout at Turning Point was featured on a variety of news outlets after the show, including ESPN's SportsCenter.

Sting made his TNA wrestling debut at Final Resolution on January 15, 2006, teaming with Christian Cage to face Jeff Jarrett and Monty Brown. This match was announced on the December 31, 2005 episode of Impact!. The team of Cage and Sting won the match at the event. This led to Cage facing Jarrett for the NWA World Heavyweight Championship at TNA's Against All Odds PPV event on February 12, 2006. Cage won the encounter to become the new champion.

Samoa Joe defended his TNA X Division Championship against Christopher Daniels at Final Resolution. TNA promoted this match for Final Resolution on the January 7, 2006 episode of Impact!. Joe won the contest after A.J. Styles threw in the towel for Daniels due to Joe beating Daniels senseless in the storyline. The rivalry continued at Against All Odds, where Daniels, Joe, and Styles competed in a Three Way match for the TNA X Division Championship; Joe gained the pinfall to retain the title. The three competed again at TNA's Destination X PPV event on March 12, 2006, but this time in a Three Way Ultimate X match for the championship. Daniels won the bout, thus becoming the new TNA X Division Champion. The rivalry ended on the April 13, 2006 episode of Impact! when Joe defeated Daniels to win back the championship.

Team 3D continued their feud with AMW at Final Resolution. Due to their victory at Turning Point Team 3D were number-one contenders to the NWA World Tag Team Championship, thus earning a championship match. TNA advertised Team 3D versus AMW for the tag team championship to take place at Final Resolution. AMW defeated Team 3D to retain the championship at the show.

Abyss started a rivalry with Rhino after the event. This started on the December 31, 2005 episode of Impact! when Abyss attacked Rhino after Rhino defeated A-1 in a match. Afterwards, TNA promoted a match between the two at Final Resolution. At the event, Rhino pinned Abyss to win the encounter.

Raven and NWA Championship Committee member Larry Zybysko continued their feud after Turning Point. On the December 17, 2005 episode of Impact!, Zybysko announced that at Final Resolution he would choose a new opponent to challenge Raven. He added a stipulation that if Raven won he gained a future NWA World Heavyweight Championship match, but if Raven lost, he would be fired from TNA. Raven faced Sean Waltman at the show in a Raven's Rules match. Raven lost the match after interference from Zybysko. Due to the stipulation attached, Raven was fired in the storyline.

The 4Live Kru broke up as a result of Konnan's actions at Turning Point. This led to B.G. James and Kip James forming The James Gang tag team and Konnan creating The Latin American Exchange alliance with Homicide and Apolo. The two teams fought at Against All Odds, which The James Gang won. Ron Killings chose not to be involved in the rivalry in the storyline, instead facing Bobby Roode at Final Resolution in a losing effort.

== Results ==
No.	Results	Stipulations	Times
1^{P}	The Naturals (Andy Douglas and Chase Stevens) and Lance Hoyt defeated Buck Quartermain, Jon Bolen, and Joe Doering	Six-man tag team match	7:11
2	Sabu defeated Abyss (with James Mitchell)	Barbed Wire Massacre	10:59
3	Austin Aries and Matt Bentley (with Traci) defeated Alex Shelley and Roderick Strong	X Division Tag team match	8:04
4	Raven defeated Chris K	Singles match	5:45
5	Team Canada (A-1, Bobby Roode, Eric Young, and Petey Williams) (with Coach Scott D'Amore) defeated 4Live Kru (B.G. James, Kip James, Konnan, and Ron Killings)	Eight-man tag team match	7:18
6	Chris Sabin, Dale Torborg, and Sonjay Dutt (with A. J. Pierzynski) defeated The Diamonds in the Rough (David Young, Elix Skipper, and Simon Diamond)	Six-man tag team match	7:57
7	Christian Cage defeated Monty Brown	Singles match to determine the #1 contender to the NWA World Heavyweight Championship	12:32
8	Team 3D (Brother Devon and Brother Ray) defeated America's Most Wanted (Chris Harris and James Storm)	Tables match	9:40
9	Samoa Joe defeated A.J. Styles (c) by technical submission	Singles match for the TNA X Division Championship	18:58
10	Jeff Jarrett (c) defeated Rhino	Singles match for the NWA World Heavyweight Championship	17:30
(c) / – the champion(s) heading into the match; P / – the match was broadcast on the pre-show
