= TNA Turning Point (2008) =

2008 Total Nonstop Action Wrestling pay-per-view event

Turning Point (2008)
- Promotional poster featuring Mick Foley
- Promotion: Total Nonstop Action Wrestling (TNA)
- Date: November 9, 2008
- City: Orlando, Florida
- Venue: TNA Impact! Zone
- Attendance: 1,100
- Tagline: "The balance of power has reached a Turning Point"

Pay-per-view chronology
← Previous; Bound for Glory IV	Next → Final Resolution

Turning Point chronology
← Previous; 2007	Next → 2009

The 2008 Turning Point was a professional wrestling pay-per-view (PPV) event produced by the Total Nonstop Action Wrestling (TNA) promotion, which took place on November 9, 2008 at the TNA Impact! Zone in Orlando, Florida. It was the fourth in the Turning Point chronology and the first under its name to take place in November. It was originally scheduled for December, but TNA moved it to November in late 2008 for an unknown reason. It was the eleventh event in the 2008 TNA PPV schedule. It was also the first TNA pay-per-view event to be broadcast in high definition. Eight professional wrestling matches, with three involving championships, were featured on the event's card.

The main event was for the TNA World Heavyweight Championship, in which then-champion Sting defeated the challenger A.J. Styles. Kevin Nash versus Samoa Joe was also featured on the card. Nash defeated Joe in the contest. A Falls Count Anywhere match pitting Kurt Angle against Abyss was promoted for the undercard, which Angle won. The TNA Legends Championship was defended for the first time by Booker T against Christian Cage during the show. Booker T was the victor in the bout, thus retaining the championship.

30,000 was the reported figure of purchasers for the event by The Wrestling Observer Newsletter. Turning Point had an attendance of 1,100 people. Bryan and Chris Sokol of the professional wrestling section of the Canadian Online Explorer website rated Turning Point a 7 out of 10, which was just above the 2007 event's rating of 6.5.

In October 2017, with the launch of the Global Wrestling Network, the event became available to stream on demand.

== Production ==
=== Background ===
On the first day of 2008, TNA updated their official website to publicize the official dates for all of their PPV events to take place that year. The next installment in the Turning Point chronology was scheduled for December 14, 2008. The date was later changed to December 21, and the location was announced as the TNA Impact! Zone in Orlando, Florida. In October 2008, three events were rescheduled: Genesis, Final Resolution, and Turning Point. The first moved was Turning Point to the Genesis event date of November 9, while Final Resolution was announced for some time in December. Genesis was later announced to be taking place in Charlotte, North Carolina on January 11, 2009. The song Indestructible by the rock band Disturbed was used as the official theme of the event. The promotional poster for the gathering, featuring Mick Foley, was released through PPV providers.

=== Storylines ===
Turning Point featured eight professional wrestling matches that involved different wrestlers from pre-existing scripted feuds and storylines. Wrestlers were portrayed as either villains or heroes in the scripted events which built tension and culminated with a wrestling match or series of matches.

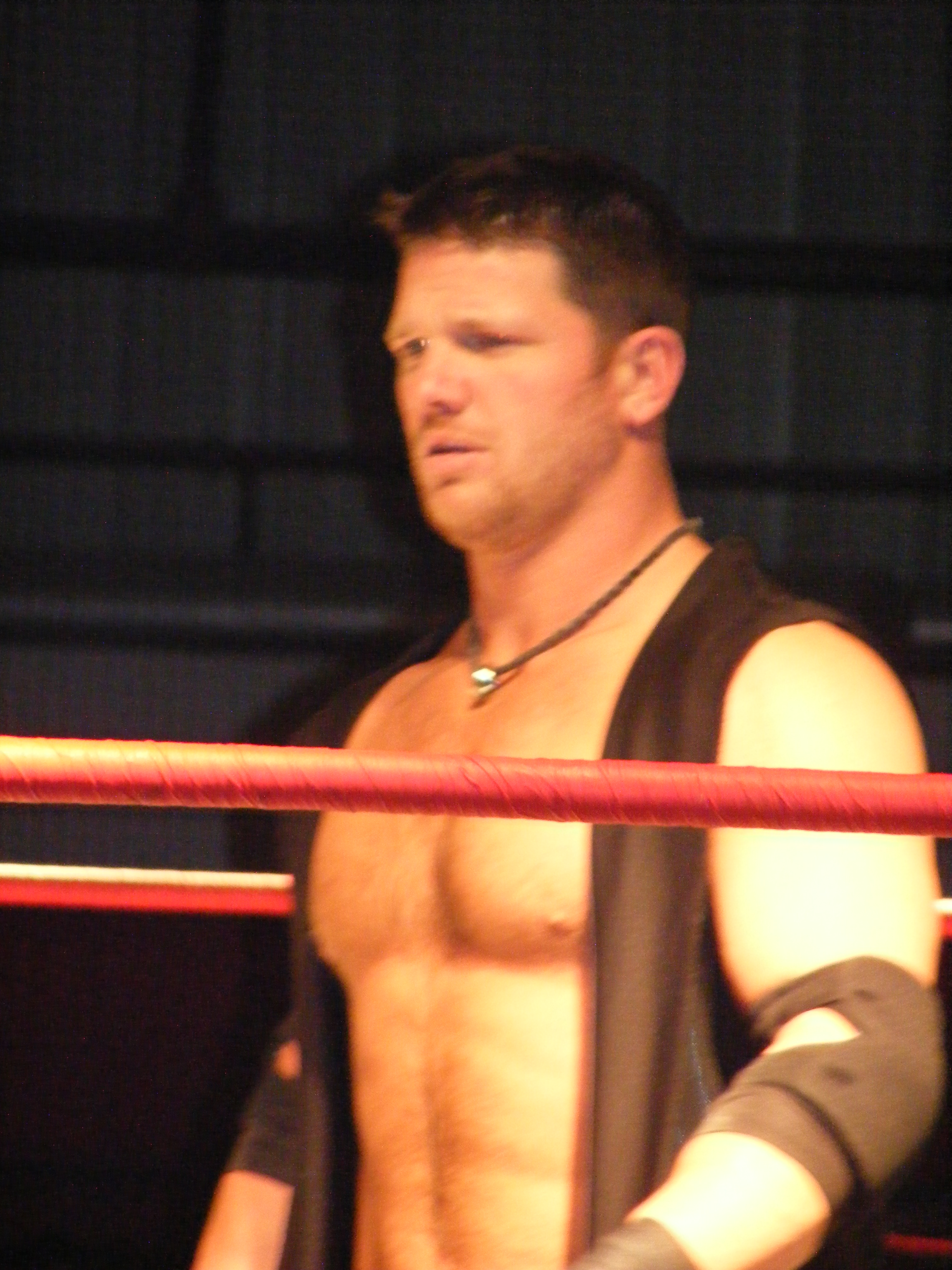
A.J. Styles (pictured) fought Sting for the TNA World Heavyweight Championship at Turning Point.

Heading into Turning Point, TNA's main storyline was an on-screen rivalry between professional wrestling veterans, who played the villains and called themselves The Main Event Mafia (Sting, Kurt Angle, Kevin Nash, Booker T, and Scott Steiner), and the younger talent of the company, who played the heroic characters and were led by A.J. Styles and Samoa Joe. Multiple smaller rivalries broke off from this storyline, such as one over the TNA World Heavyweight Championship between the reigning champion, Sting, and the challenger, Styles. It began on August 10 at TNA's Hard Justice PPV event when Sting assaulted Styles after his encounter with Angle. Sting then defeated Joe, an ally of Styles, at TNA's Bound for Glory IV PPV event on October 12 after an assist from Nash, which later sparked a rivalry between Joe and Nash. Sting's and Styles' rivalry soon escalated to a point where storyline co-owner of TNA Mick Foley announced on the October 30 episode of TNA's television program TNA Impact! that the two would fight for the championship at Turning Point.

The build to the encounter between Joe and Nash began in December 2007. On December 2, 2007 at the previous Turning Point event, Joe was scheduled to take part in a Six Man Tag Team match, partnering with Nash and Nash's longtime real-life friend Scott Hall to face The Angle Alliance (Angle, Styles, and Tomko). Hall, however, missed the event citing "food poisoning", leaving Joe legitimately angered by the excuse. Joe went on to make an on-camera statement in the ring insulting Hall. Following the incident, TNA began a storyline in which Joe was unhappy with his position in the company for various reasons and had continuous conflicts with Nash. After time, Nash became Joe's on-screen mentor, which led to Joe defeating Angle on April 13 at TNA's Lockdown PPV event to become the new TNA World Heavyweight Champion. Joe and Nash's partnership seemed to come to a close after Nash disappeared from TNA television in mid-2008. He returned at Bound for Glory IV where he cost Joe the championship in his match against Sting. On the October 30 episode of Impact!, Foley announced that Joe would face Nash at Turning Point.

Another bout advertised for the event was Angle versus Abyss in a Falls Count Anywhere match. At Bound for Glory IV, Angle lost to TNA founder and on-screen co-owner Jeff Jarrett with Foley as Special Guest Enforcer. On the Impact! after Bound for Glory IV, Angle challenged Jarrett to another match at Turning Point, however, Jarrett refused. Angered by Jarrett's refusal, Angle began assaulting several wrestlers in TNA to persuade Jarrett into accepting the challenge. On the October 23 episode of Impact!, Angle challenged Jarrett again to a rematch, which Jarrett again refused. Jarrett, however, recommended Abyss as Angle's opponent, who was a casualty of Angle's attacks the previous week. On the October 30 episode of Impact!, Angle fought Abyss in a contest which ended in a disqualification after Angle struck Abyss with a steel chair. Following their encounter, a match was promoted pitting Angle against Abyss in a Falls Count Anywhere match at Turning Point.

On the October 23 episode of Impact!, Booker T introduced a new championship named the TNA Legends Championship and declared himself the inaugural champion. Afterwards, Christian Cage, who had remained neutral in the storyline, entered the arena and challenged Booker T to defend the championship against him at Turning Point. Booker T accepted after he added the stipulation that if Cage lost the encounter he would have to join The Main Event Mafia. Later on the October 30 episode of Impact!, the match was made official when it was promoted for the event.

== Event ==
=== Miscellaneous ===
The event featured employees other than the wrestlers involved in the matches. There were four overall commentators for the event; Mike Tenay and Don West provided English commentary, while Hector Guerrero and Willie Urbina served as the Spanish announce team. There were three ring announcers for the spectacle as the normal ring announcer, David Penzer, was used for all but two contests. Retired Army veteran Sean M. Autrey served as the special guest ring announcer for the Rhino and Sheik Abdul Bashir encounter. Jeremy Borash announced the competitors for the TNA World Heavyweight Championship match, using a style similar to professional boxing as made famous by Michael Buffer. Shane Sewell, Earl Hebner, Rudy Charles, Mark "Slick" Johnson, and Andrew Thomas participated as referees for the encounters. Borash and Lauren Thompson were used as interviewers throughout the event. Besides wrestlers who were appearing in a wrestling role, Jeff Jarrett, Mick Foley, Scott Steiner, and Matt Morgan were also featured in backstage segments. Other than contractual employees being featured, the group Insane Clown Posse (ICP) and Scott Hall were seen in attendance. This was later revealed to have been scripted to occur, as TNA had asked ICP to attend the event, but were unaware of Hall being their guest.

=== Preliminary matches ===
The event commenced with a ten-man X Division elimination rankings match, which involved Eric Young, Consequences Creed, Doug Williams, Homicide, Jay Lethal, Jimmy Rave, Petey Williams, Sonjay Dutt, Tanahashi, and Volador. The match was announced as following lucha libre tag team rules, in which a participant could be replaced if thrown from the ring to the floor, but not eliminated from the match unless by pinfall or submission. The order of elimination determined the standings in the X Division towards a future TNA X Division Championship match, in storyline. Homicide was injured during the match, thus was declared eliminated after a bad fall to the outside area. Lethal and Young were the final two men in the contest. Young was the victor in the match after slamming Lethal into the mat with a bridging back suplex at 17 minutes.

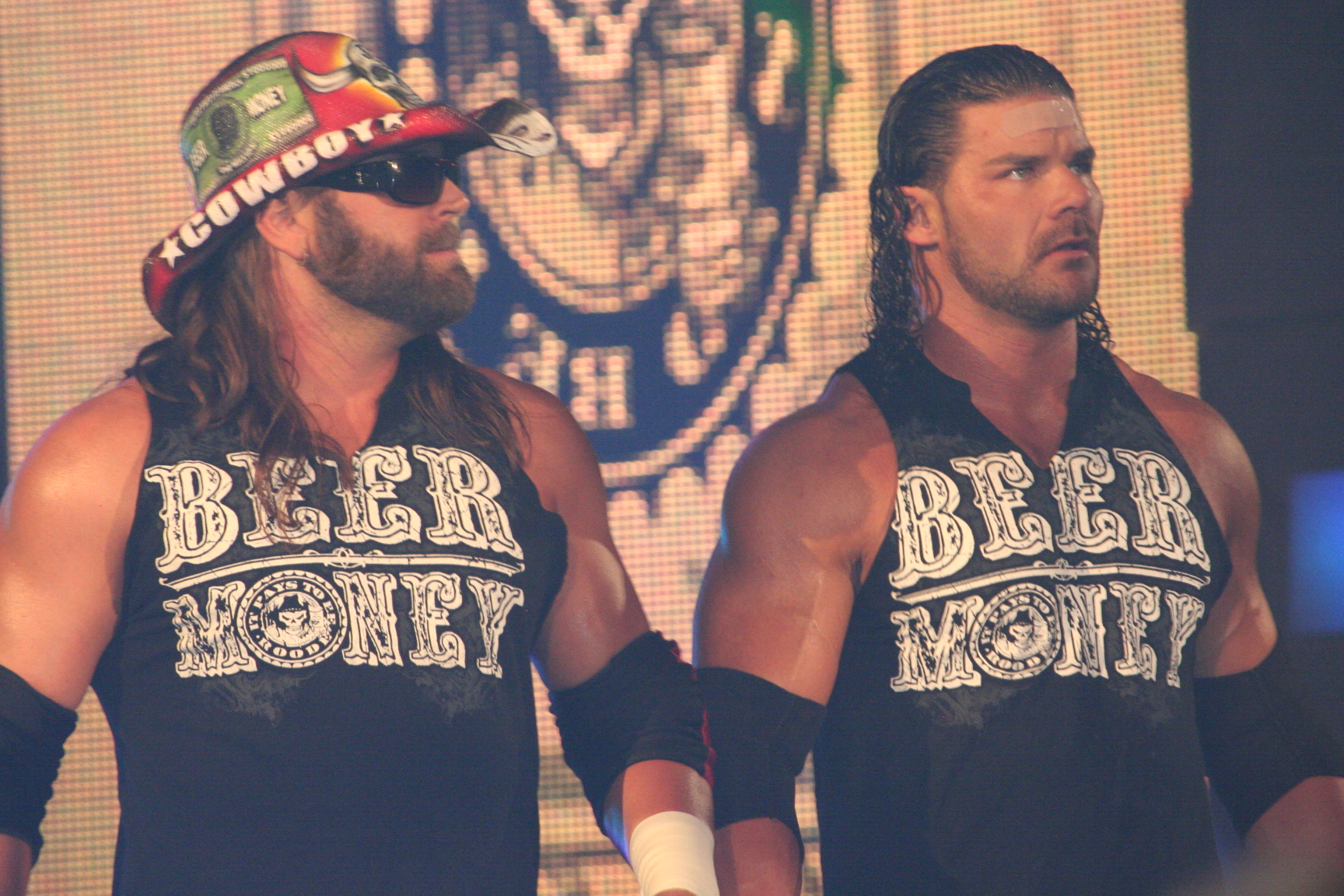
Beer Money, Inc. (James Storm and Robert Roode; pictured) retained the TNA World Tag Team Championship at Turning Point.

A tag team match pitting the team of Roxxi and Taylor Wilde against the team of Awesome Kong and Raisha Saeed, who were accompanied by Rhaka Khan, was held. After various maneuvers were performed by each competitor, Wilde gained the pinfall victory on Saeed after forcing her back into the mat with a bridging German suplex at eight minutes.

Rhino fought Sheik Abdul Bashir in the following bout. Ten-year Army veteran Sean M. Autrey served as the special guest ring announcer for the encounter. The match lasted nine minutes, and came to a finish when Rhino pinned Bashir after a tackle.

The TNA World Tag Team Championship was contested between the reigning champions Beer Money, Inc. (James Storm and Robert Roode), who were accompanied by Jacqueline, and The Motor City Machineguns of Alex Shelley and Chris Sabin. After several tag team maneuvers from both teams, Storm spat beer in Sabin's face, blinding him. This allowed Beer Money to lift up and slam Sabin back-first to the mat with their Drinking While Investing (DWI) tag team maneuver to gain the pinfall and retain the championship at 17 minutes.

=== Main event matches ===
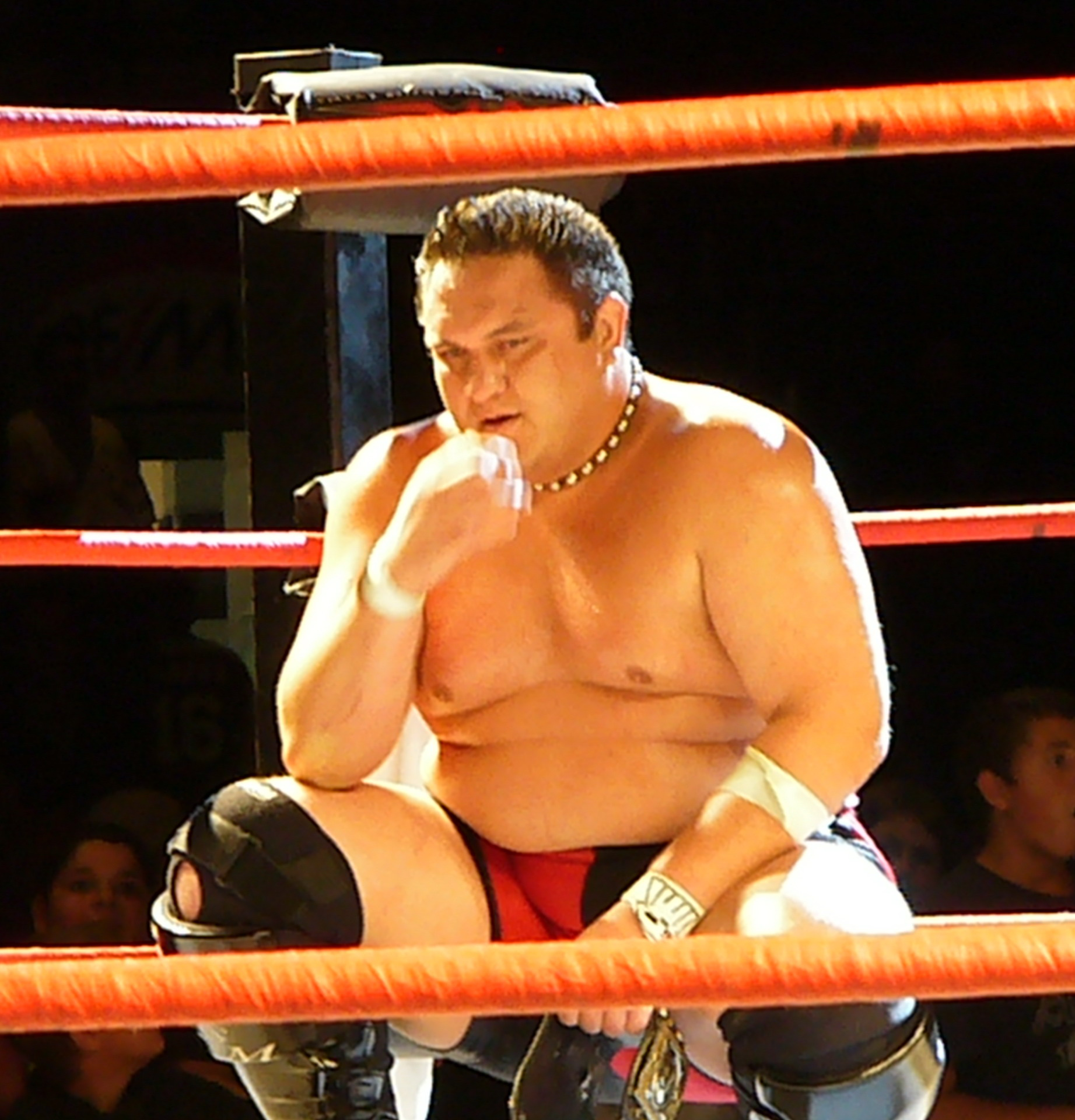
Samoa Joe (pictured) was defeated by Kevin Nash in their encounter at Turning Point.

The fifth match was Booker T's defense of the TNA Legends Championship against Christian Cage, with the added stipulation that if Cage lost, he would be forced to join The Main Event Mafia. Booker T was accompanied by Sharmell for the bout. The match lasted for 11 minutes, ending when Booker T pinned Cage with a roll-up.

A Falls Count Anywhere match between Kurt Angle and Abyss followed, lasting 17 minutes. At one point during the encounter while Abyss was standing on the concrete floor and Angle was on the stage, Angle performed a running leap off the stage into a somersault senton, connecting with Abyss on the floor. Angle was the victor in the bout, after throwing Abyss off of a scaffold through the Spanish announcers' table, then descending and covering Abyss for the pinfall.

Kevin Nash fought Samoa Joe in the seventh contest of the night. The match lasted 12 minutes. At two points during the match, Nash performed his signature Jackknife Powerbomb with Joe kicking out before the three count. This led to Nash hitting Joe in the groin and placing his feet on the ropes for leverage in his winning pin attempt.

The main event was for the TNA World Heavyweight Championship between the champion, Sting, and the challenger, A.J. Styles. During the 15 minutes the match lasted, Styles executed his aerial technique the Spiral Tap, in which he jumps off one of the top padded turnbuckles, spins and flips in mid-air before landing on his opponent. He then ascended the turnbuckle to perform the maneuver once again, but was distracted by Angle and Booker T. Later, Styles missed a pele kick on Sting, which allowed Sting to counter with a small package pin on Styles to retain the championship.

== Reception ==
A total of 1,100 people attended the event. In late 2008, The Wrestling Observer Newsletter reported that the number of pay-per-view purchasers for the event was believed to be 30,000. Canadian Online Explorer writers Bryan and Chris Sokol rated the entire event a 7 out of 10, which was .5 above the 2007 event's rating of 6.5 by Chris Sokol. The Falls Count Anywhere match was given the highest rating during their review, at 8 out of 10. The lowest rating was given to the women's tag team match and the Rhino versus Bashir bout, at 5 out of 10. The main event match for the TNA World Heavyweight Championship was rated 7 out of 10. Wade Keller of the Pro Wrestling Torch stated during his review that the Falls Count Anywhere match "had an epic feeling for a falls count anywhere brawl. It had various chapters, many convincing near falls, several creative big spots, and the crowd was into it." While regarding the main event, Keller stated he thought it was a "good match." James Caldwell, also of the Pro Wrestling Torch, mentioned during his review that Joe versus Nash had "good drama" due to the storyline "with a big game veteran vs. a big game 'Young Lion' in a compelling match-up. Joe losing should be treated as a huge deal with proper follow-up to move Joe up to the next level. If he's losing, it needs to mean something for his overall growth." The event was released by TNA Home Video on DVD on March 24, 2009 as part of the "TNA Wrestling: Cross The Line Vol. 2" box set, which included the December 2008 Final Resolution event and the Genesis 2009 event.

== Aftermath ==
On the November 13 episode of Impact!, Cage was to be inducted into The Main Event Mafia (MEM), however, they instead turned on and assaulted him after it was revealed that he would be leaving TNA upon the expiration of his contract. This led to Cage's occasional tag team partner, Rhino, becoming involved in the overall storyline as the leader of the group The TNA Front Line after he was attacked by MEM on the November 20 episode of Impact!. During that same telecast, Angle versus Rhino was announced as TNA's Final Resolution event, with the added stipulations that if Angle won he would gain an opportunity to face Jeff Jarrett, while if Rhino won, then Angle was to be released from his TNA contract. Angle went on to defeat Rhino at the event, which led to Angle defeating Jarrett in a No Disqualification match at TNA's Genesis event in January 2009.

Sting and Styles went on to have another match for the TNA World Heavyweight Championship at Final Resolution. This time, the team of Sting, Steiner, Nash, and Booker T faced off against Styles, Joe, and two mystery partners (The TNA Front Line) in an Eight Man Tag Team match. The stipulations were if anyone from Styles' team pinned a member of Sting's team, then Styles won the TNA Title, while if anyone from Sting's team pinned a member of Styles' team, then Sting retained the title. The match was announced on the November 20 episode of Impact!. Styles' mystery partners were revealed on the November 27 episode of Impact! as Team 3D (Brother Devon and Brother Ray). Sting went on to retain the title at Final Resolution after he pinned Joe.

Eric Young got his TNA X Division Championship match on the November 13 episode of Impact! against then-champion Sheik Abdul Bashir. Though he defeated him to become the new champion, a week later the decision was reversed and Young was forced to relinquish the title belt to Bashir due to a controversial ending to their match. Young and Bashir fought for the championship once again at Final Resolution, with referee Shane Sewell interfering in the bout like he had done in the previous encounter, which allowed Young to gain the victory. Afterwards, Management Director Jim Cornette stripped Young of the championship. This set up a tournament for the title, ending at Genesis where Alex Shelley defeated Chris Sabin to become the new champion.

== Results ==
No.	Results	Stipulations	Times
1	Eric Young defeated Consequences Creed, Doug Williams, Homicide, Jay Lethal, Jimmy Rave, Petey Williams, Sonjay Dutt, Tanahashi and Volador	Ten Man X Division Elimination Rankings match to determine the #1 contender to the TNA X Division Championship	17:00
2	Roxxi and Taylor Wilde defeated Awesome Kong and Raisha Saeed (with Rhaka Khan)	Tag team match	8:00
3	Rhino defeated Sheik Abdul Bashir	Singles match	9:00
4	Beer Money, Inc. (James Storm and Robert Roode) (c) (with Jacqueline) defeated The Motor City Machine Guns (Alex Shelley and Chris Sabin)	Tag team match for the TNA World Tag Team Championship	17:00
5	Booker T (c) (with Sharmell) defeated Christian Cage	Singles match for the TNA Legends Championship (Note: As per the pre-match stipulation, Cage was forced to join The Main Event Mafia.)	11:00
6	Kurt Angle defeated Abyss	Falls Count Anywhere match	17:00
7	Kevin Nash defeated Samoa Joe	Singles match	12:00
8	Sting (c) defeated A.J. Styles	Singles match for the TNA World Heavyweight Championship	15:00
(c) / – the champion(s) heading into the match

X Division Rankings match eliminations

Elimination No.	Eliminated participant	Eliminator
1	Sonjay Dutt	Volador
2	Volador	Jimmy Rave
3	Jimmy Rave	Doug Williams
4	Homicide	Injured
5	Consequences Creed	Petey Williams
6	Petey Williams	Hiroshi Tanahashi
7	Hiroshi Tanahashi	Jay Lethal
8	Doug Williams	Eric Young
9	Jay Lethal	Eric Young
Winner	Eric Young	N/A
