= TNA Turning Point =

Professional wrestling event series

Turning Point
- TNA Turning Point logo
- Promotions: Total Nonstop Action Wrestling
- First event: Turning Point (2004)
- Last event: TNA Turning Point (2025)

Turning Point was a professional wrestling TNA+ event, produced by American professional wrestling promotion Total Nonstop Action Wrestling. The event was created in 2004 and was originally held annually in December, until the 2008 event where TNA changed its scheduled date to November. The 2004 event was the second TNA PPV to be produced annually. Since its inception, the event was held exclusively in an indoor arena in Orlando, Florida, with all events taking place in the Impact Zone until 2019. Each event featured talent from TNA competing in various professional wrestling match types. Since the inaugural event, eight championship matches took place in the main event.

TNA discontinued the majority of the monthly pay-per-views in 2013 in favor of new pre-recorded One Night Only events. Turning Point was held as a special episode of Impact Wrestling in 2013, 2015 and 2016 and, in 2019, was revived as an Impact Plus Monthly Special event.

== History ==
Turning Point is a pay-per-view event consisting of a main event and undercard that feature championship matches and other various matches. The first event was held December 5, 2004 and aired live on PPV, and was the second event held by TNA to be established as an annual PPV. Since then, TNA has produced the event in December until 2007. However, in 2008, TNA chose without explanation to hold the event in November and produce Final Resolution in December. On January 11, 2013, TNA announced that only four pay-per-view events would be held that year, dropping Turning Point and the majority of its other PPV events. Each Turning Point event has been held in an indoor arena, with all events taking place in the Impact Zone in Orlando, Florida until 2019.

== Events ==
#	Event	Date	City	Venue	Main event	Ref
1	Turning Point (2004)	December 5, 2004	Orlando, Florida	Impact Zone	America's Most Wanted (Chris Harris and James Storm) vs. Triple X (Christopher Daniels and Elix Skipper) in a Six Sides of Steel Cage match	
2	Turning Point (2005)	December 11, 2005	Orlando, Florida	Impact Zone	Jeff Jarrett (c) vs. Rhino for the NWA World Heavyweight Championship	
3	Turning Point (2006)	December 10, 2006	Orlando, Florida	Impact Zone	Kurt Angle vs. Samoa Joe	
4	Turning Point (2007)	December 2, 2007	Orlando, Florida	Impact Zone	Eric Young, Kevin Nash, and Samoa Joe vs. The Angle Alliance (Kurt Angle, A.J. Styles, and Tomko) in a Six Man Tag Team match	
5	Turning Point (2008)	November 9, 2008	Orlando, Florida	Impact Zone	Sting (c) vs. A.J. Styles for the TNA World Heavyweight Championship	
6	Turning Point (2009)	November 15, 2009	Orlando, Florida	Impact Zone	A.J. Styles (c) vs Daniels vs. Samoa Joe in a Three Way match for the TNA World Heavyweight Championship	
7	Turning Point (2010)	November 7, 2010	Orlando, Florida	Impact Zone	Jeff Hardy (c) vs. Matt Morgan for the TNA World Heavyweight Championship	
8	Turning Point (2011)	November 13, 2011	Orlando, Florida	Impact Zone	Bobby Roode (c) vs. A.J. Styles for the TNA World Heavyweight Championship	
9	Turning Point (2012)	November 11, 2012	Orlando, Florida	Impact Zone	Jeff Hardy (c) vs. Austin Aries in a Ladder match for the TNA World Heavyweight Championship	
10	Turning Point (2013)	November 21, 2013	Orlando, Florida	Impact Zone	Bully Ray vs. Mr. Anderson in a No Disqualification match	
11	One Night Only: Turning Point	September 5, 2014 (Aired January 9, 2015)	Charlottesville, Virginia	John Paul Jones Arena	Jeff Hardy vs. MVP	
12	Turning Point (2015)	July 28, 2015 (Aired August 19)	Orlando, Florida	Impact Zone	Ethan Carter III (c) vs. P.J Black for the TNA World Heavyweight Championship	
13	Turning Point (2016)	August 12, 2016 (Aired August 25)	Orlando, Florida	Impact Zone	Ethan Carter III vs. Drew Galloway	
14	One Night Only: Turning Point 2017	April 22, 2017	Orlando, Florida	Impact Zone	Bobby Lashley (c) vs. Moose for the Impact World Championship	
15	Turning Point (2019)	November 9, 2019	Hazleton, Pennsylvania	Holy Family Academy	Sami Callihan (c) vs. Brian Cage for the Impact World Championship	
16	Turning Point (2020)	November 14, 2020	Nashville, Tennessee	Skyway Studios	Rich Swann (c) vs. Sami Callihan for the Impact World Championship	
17	Turning Point (2021)	November 20, 2021	Sunrise Manor, Nevada	Sam's Town Live	Moose (c) vs. Eddie Edwards in a Full Metal Mayhem match for the Impact World Championship	
18	Turning Point (2023)	November 3, 2023	Newcastle upon Tyne, England	Walker Activity Dome	Will Ospreay vs. Eddie Edwards	
19	Turning Point (2024)	November 29, 2024	Winston-Salem, North Carolina	Benton Convention Center	Nic Nemeth (c) vs. Eddie Edwards for the TNA World Championship	
20	Turning Point (2025)	November 14, 2025	Winter Park, Florida	Full Sail University	Mike Santana and Steve Maclin vs. Nic Nemeth and Frankie Kazarian	
(c) - refers to the champion prior to the match
