= TNA Turning Point (2010) =

2010 Total Nonstop Action Wrestling pay-per-view event

Turning Point (2010)
- Promotional poster featuring Jeff Hardy
- Promotion: Total Nonstop Action Wrestling
- Date: November 7, 2010
- City: Orlando, Florida
- Venue: Impact Zone
- Attendance: 1,100

Pay-per-view chronology
← Previous; Bound for Glory	Next → Final Resolution

Turning Point chronology
← Previous; 2009	Next → 2011

The 2010 Turning Point was a professional wrestling pay-per-view event produced by Total Nonstop Action Wrestling (TNA), that took place on November 7, 2010 at the Impact Zone in Orlando, Florida. It was the seventh event under the Turning Point chronology.

The main event featured Jeff Hardy defending the TNA World Heavyweight Championship against Matt Morgan, which Hardy won following the Twist of Hate. Rob Van Dam versus Tommy Dreamer in a No Disqualification match was also featured on the card. Van Dam defeated Dreamer in the contest. The main bouts on the undercard included Jeff Jarrett versus Samoa Joe, which Jarrett won through making Joe pass out to his signature Rear Naked Choke, and in a Ten Man Tag Team match, Fortune (A.J. Styles, Kazarian, Douglas Williams, Robert Roode, and James Storm) battled EV 2.0 (Raven, Rhino, Sabu, Stevie Richards and Brian Kendrick), where Fortune won after Styles executed the Styles Clash on Sabu from the top rope.

In October 2017, with the launch of the Global Wrestling Network, the event became available to stream on demand.

== Storylines ==
Other on-screen personnel
Commentator	Mike Tenay
Commentator	Taz
Ring announcer	Jeremy Borash
Referee	Earl Hebner
Referee	Rudy Charles
Referee	Mark "Slick" Johnson
Referee	Jackson James
Referee	Andrew Thomas
Interviewers	Jeremy Borash

Turning Point featured eight professional wrestling matches that involved different wrestlers from pre-existing scripted feuds and storylines. Wrestlers portrayed villains, heroes, or less distinguishable characters in the scripted events that built tension and culminated in a wrestling match or series of matches.

== Results ==
No.	Results	Stipulations	Times
1	Robbie E (with Cookie) defeated Jay Lethal (c)	Singles match for the TNA X Division Championship	10:42
2	Mickie James vs. Tara ended in a no-contest	Singles match	10:17
3	The Motor City Machine Guns (Alex Shelley and Chris Sabin) (c) defeated Team 3D (Brother Devon and Brother Ray)	Tag team match for the TNA World Tag Team Championship	18:08
4	Rob Van Dam defeated Tommy Dreamer	No Disqualification match	16:53
5	Fortune (A.J. Styles, Douglas Williams, James Storm, Kazarian and Robert Roode) defeated EV 2.0 (Brian Kendrick, Raven, Rhino, Sabu and Stevie Richards)	Ten-man tag team match (Note: The winning team gets to fire a member of the losing team.)	12:05
6	Abyss defeated D'Angelo Dinero	Lumberjack match	13:02
7	Jeff Jarrett defeated Samoa Joe by submission	Singles match	10:32
8	Jeff Hardy (c) defeated Matt Morgan	Singles match for the TNA World Heavyweight Championship	13:06
(c) / – the champion(s) heading into the match
