= Impact Wrestling Turning Point (2020) =

Professional wrestling event

Turning Point (2020)
- Promotional poster featuring Rich Swann, Sami Callihan, Su Yung, and Deonna Purrazzo
- Promotion: Impact Wrestling
- Date: November 14, 2020
- City: Nashville, Tennessee
- Venue: Skyway Studios
- Attendance: 0 (behind closed doors) (Note: The event was held without a paying audience due to the COVID-19 pandemic in the United States.)

Impact Plus Monthly Specials chronology
← Previous; Victory Road	Next → Final Resolution

Turning Point chronology
← Previous; 2019	Next → 2021

The 2020 Turning Point was a professional wrestling event produced by Impact Wrestling. It took place on November 14, 2020, at the Skyway Studios in Nashville, Tennessee, and aired exclusively on Impact Plus before being available for free on YouTube. It was the 14th event in the Turning Point chronology.

Nine matches were contested at the event. In the main event, Rich Swann successfully defended the Impact World Championship against Sami Callihan. In other prominent matches, Deonna Purrazzo defeated Su Yung in a no disqualification match to win the Impact Knockouts Championship, The Good Brothers (Doc Gallows and Karl Anderson) defeated The North (Ethan Page and Josh Alexander) to win the Impact World Tag Team Championship, and Rohit Raju defeated Cousin Jake to retain the Impact X Division Championship. The event also marked the Impact return of former All Japan Pro Wrestling Triple Crown Heavyweight Champion Joe Doering as Eric Young's enforcer.

Turning Point garnered positive reviews from critics, praising the World Tag Team and Knockouts title changes, and the Impact World title main event.

== Production ==
=== Background ===
In 2013, Impact Wrestling (then known as Total Nonstop Action Wrestling) discontinued monthly pay-per-view events in favor of the pre-recorded One Night Only events. Turning Point was produced as a PPV from 2004 to 2012. It was revived as a monthly special for Impact Plus in 2019. On October 30, 2020, Impact Wrestling announced that Turning Point would return as an Impact Plus Monthly Special on November 14.

==== Impact of the COVID-19 pandemic ====
As a result of the COVID-19 pandemic, Impact had to present the majority of its programming from a behind closed doors set at Skyway Studios in Nashville, Tennessee, beginning in April.

=== Storylines ===
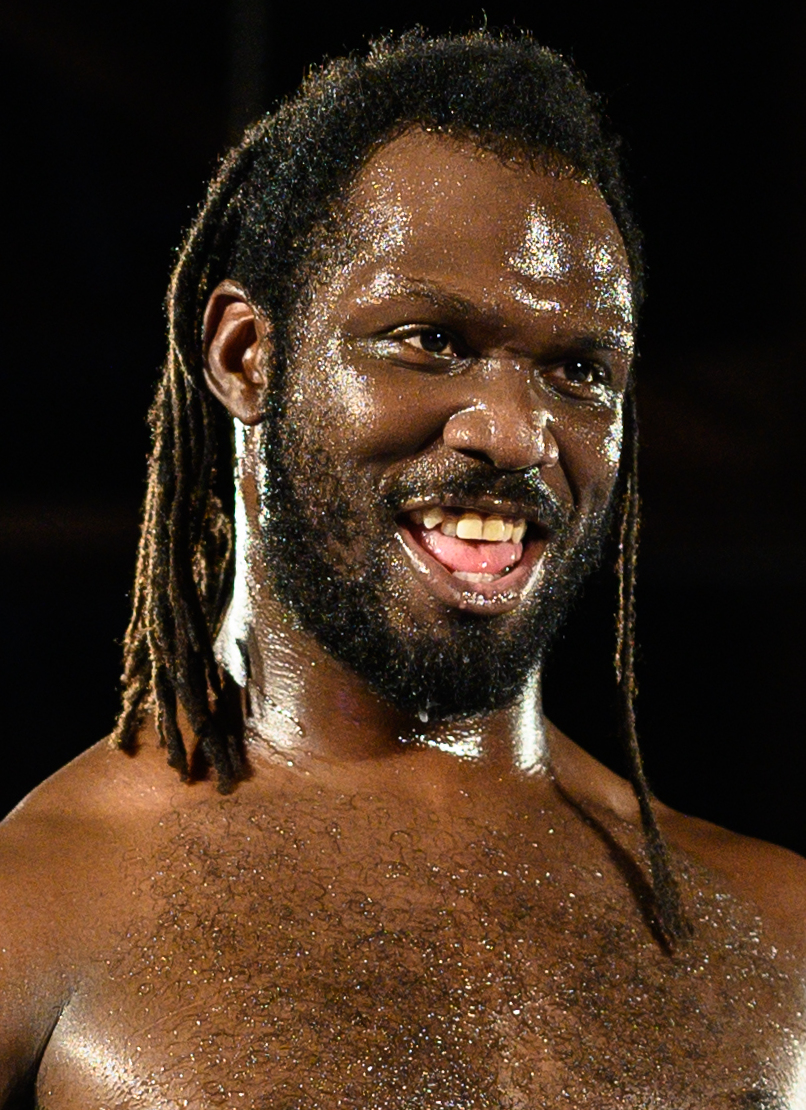
Rich Swann entered Turning Point as Impact World Champion.

The event featured professional wrestling matches that involved different wrestlers from pre-existing scripted feuds and storylines. Wrestlers portrayed villains, heroes, or less distinguishable characters in scripted events that build tension and culminate in a wrestling match or series of matches.

At Bound for Glory, Eddie Edwards lost to Ken Shamrock while Rich Swann defeated Eric Young in the main event to capture the Impact World Championship. Swann successfully defended the title against Young in a rematch on the October 27 episode of Impact!. The following week, Swann teamed with Edwards to take on Young and Shamrock's tag team partner Sami Callihan in a tag team match, which Young and Callihan won after interference by Shamrock, who attacked Swann during the match. As a result, it was announced that Swann would defend the Impact World Championship against Callihan at Turning Point.

At Bound for Glory, Su Yung replaced Deonna Purrazzo's originally scheduled challenger Kylie Rae and defeated Purrazzo to win the Impact Knockouts Championship. A rematch took place between the two on the November 3 episode of Impact!, which ended after a tussle between Yung and Purrazzo over a chair and the latter being hit with it accidentally, resulting in Yung being disqualified and retaining the title. It was later announced that Yung will defend the Knockouts Championship against Purrazzo in a no disqualification match at Turning Point.

At Bound for Glory, The North (Ethan Page and Josh Alexander) defeated defending champions The Motor City Machine Guns (Alex Shelley and Chris Sabin), The Good Brothers (Doc Gallows and Karl Anderson) and Ace Austin and Madman Fulton in a four-way match to win the Impact World Tag Team Championship after The North cheated to defeat The Good Brothers. On the October 27 episode of Impact, a brawl broke out between both teams in the backstage area, where The North considered The Good Brothers to be the worst investment by Impact Wrestling. On the November 3 episode of Impact!, Gallows defeated Page in a singles match. It was later announced that The North will defend the tag team titles against The Good Brothers at Turning Point.

On the October 27 episode of Impact!, Moose declared that his TNA World Heavyweight Championship was the top title in Impact Wrestling instead of Rich Swann's Impact World Championship, criticizing the fact that the TNA title was being ignored in favor of the Impact title and confronted Swann, but his friend Willie Mack came to Swann's defense. Moose responded by hitting Mack with the title belt while he was filming a video message for a fan. It was later announced that Mack would face Moose in a match at Turning Point.

On the October 27 episode of Impact!, Swoggle helped Tommy Dreamer in defeating Brian Myers in a Hardcore Halloween match by attacking Myers with a pair of tongs to his testicles. The following week, during an interview where Swoggle proclaimed to be at home in Impact Wrestling, Myers interrupted by calling him "a sideshow attraction", ripped up his autobiography and pushed him to the floor. Six days later, it was announced that Myers will go against Swoggle in a match at Turning Point.

== Event ==
Other on-screen personnel
Commentators	Josh Mathews
Commentators	Madison Rayne
Ring announcer	David Penzer
Referees	Brandon Tolle
Referees	Daniel Spencer
Interviewer	Gia Miller

=== Preliminary matches ===
The opening match of the event was Eddie Edwards versus Daivari. After some back-and-forth chain wrestling, Edwards delivered a vertical suplex on Daivari for a two count. Edwards continues the offensive with an inverted atomic drop and overhead belly-to-belly suplex, but Daivari gets the advantage on him after sending his shoulder to the ring post. Daivari targets the shoulder with various armbars and attacks to the ring posts, but Edwards fights back after catching him on the top rope with a backpack stunner for two, with Daivari countering his tiger driver with a tackle to the corner and preventing an aerial attack with a hurricanrana for another two count. Edwards gets the tiger driver for a near fall, with Daivari attempting a roll-up with his feet on the ropes but gets caught by the referee who he argues with over, leaving him distracted when Edwards hits the "Boston Knee Party" for the win.

Next, a knockouts tag team match was contested between Jordynne Grace and Tenille Dashwood (with Kaleb with a K) against Rosemary and Taya Valkyrie. Dashwood attempts to get some photos in the ring before being interrupted by Rosemary who chokes her. Valkyrie tags in, which forces Dashwood to tag out, allowing Grace to dominate Valkyrie with some shoulder tackles and a senton for a two count. Grace attempts to tag in Dashwood who is busy stretching, leaving her open for a double team attack by Valkyrie and Rosemary, who tags in to apply a Muta lock on Grace who grabs the ropes. After taking a German suplex, Grace fights back and delivers a spinebuster on Valkyrie, unknowingly getting tagged by Dashwood who makes the pin but only gets two. Grace tags back in, landing an elbow drop on Valkyrie for two, only to get caught with a spear afterwards. Rosemary tags in, with Grace not getting a tag from Dashwood who is taking pictures, allowing her to apply "As Above, So Below" on Grace to get the pinfall for her team.

The third match was between Brian Myers and Swoggle. Myers refuses Swoggle's handshake and is given a slap to the face, leaving him open to a headscissors and tope suicida by Swoggle. Myers gets the upper hand by taking out Swoggle on the outside, who barely enters the ring before the referee's ten count. Myers dominates Swoggle with numerous head stomps and elbows to the chest, who comes back with some chops and a roll-up for two, only to get caught in a front facelock by Myers. Swoggle gets the advantage on Myers with another slap to the face and a German suplex. Swoggle lands the tadpole splash for a near fall, but gets taken out by Myers with a clothesline who gets the pinfall victory. After the match, Myers continued to beat down on Swoggle, only to leave the ring when Crazzy Steve arrives to save him.

The fourth match involved the team of Chris Sabin and James Storm against XXXL (Acey Romero and Larry D). Both teams went back-and-forth with their attacks on each other, with Sabin getting the most of it from Romero and Larry D. Storm gets the tag and delivers a neckbreaker on Larry D, with Romero breaking up his cover and getting hit with a crossbody from Sabin, leaving XXXL open for cross bodies from both Storm and Sabin on opposite sides of the ring. Larry D gets attacked with a double suplex and Storm-assisted tornado DDT by Sabin, but manages to kick out at two and tag in Romero, who delivers a senton on Sabin for another two count. XXXL mistime their running smash and hit each other instead, allowing both Sabin and Storm to deliver an enzigiri and superkick combination onto Romero and get the win.

Next, X Division Champion Rohit Raju entered the ring to issue the Defeat Rohit Challenge with his title on the line, saying that anyone can face him except for TJP, as long as he holds the championship. Cousin Jake (with Cody Deaner), appears to answer Raju's open challenge. Jake gets the early offense, but Raju fights back with a double stomp to Jake's back for a two count. Raju attempts to apply a crossface on Jake, but he avoids the move to give Raju a spear in the corner. After hitting the Rikishi Driver for a two, Jake gets taken to the corner with a back elbow and pump kick combination by Raju, who gets caught in a sitout powerbomb by Jake for a near fall. Jake sets up Raju for a superplex, but he manages to knock him off, with Raju missing the double stomp but able to knock out Jake with some knee strikes and pin him to retain his title. After the match, Eric Young appears with AJPW wrestler Joe Doering, making his return to Impact. Doering takes out the Deaners.

The sixth match was Moose versus Willie Mack for the unsanctioned TNA World Heavyweight Championship. The two start off by trading some forearm strikes in the ring and on the apron, before Moose takes Mack to the floor and sends a message to Rich Swann as he sends his friend to the barricade. Back in the ring, Moose applies a chin lock onto Mack who gets out of it, but gets hit with a dropkick and kicks out at two. Moose continues the assault on Mack with clubbing blows and stomps, whips and a back elbow to the corner, but Mack fight back with some running strikes, only for Moose to hit a pair of uranages onto him. The two exchange right hands to each other before Mack gives Moose some running clotheslines and a spinning kick to knock him out. Mack hits the scoop slam into a leg drop for a two count, and gets caught on the top rope by Moose who hits him with a superplex. Mack leapfrogs Moose's spear attempt and plants him with a Samoan drop and a standing moonsault for two. Moose counters a stunner and hits Mack with the spear, mounting him to apply some punches before the referee stops the match. Moose continues to assault Mack, forcing the referee to reverse his decision, and give Mack the win by disqualification.

The seventh match was contested between The Good Brothers (Doc Gallows and Karl Anderson) and The North (Ethan Page and Josh Alexander) for the Impact World Tag Team Championship. Alexander and Anderson start things off with a back-and-forth exchange of holds, with Gallows tagging in to deliver a suplex and multiple elbow drops for a two count that's interrupted by Page. Anderson gets back in the ring, only to get attacked by Page who tagged in, but gets the upper hand by tagging Gallows to hit a leg drop for two. The North regain control by beating Anderson on the outside and back in the ring with repeated attacks to his neck and knee. Gallows gets the tag and lays some offense on The North, only to lose the momentum after Page prevents him from tagging Anderson, leaving him open to a double team attack by Alexander and Page. The North attempt to apply The Northern Assault on Gallows, but Anderson takes Page out of the ring and helps Gallows hit Alexander with a back suplex-neckbreaker combination, leading to them applying the "Magic Killer" but Page stops it with a superkick, and Anderson hits Alexander with a running kick. Page tags in and misses the running splash onto Anderson, who plants him with a spinebuster and takes out Alexander with the "Gun Stun", and tags in Gallows to hit the "Magic Killer" on Page to win the tag titles for the first time.

In the penultimate match, Su Yung defended the Impact Knockouts Championship against Deonna Purrazzo in a no disqualification match. The two begin to brawl with each other at ringside, with Yung dragging Purrazzo into the ring with a head scissors submission, before losing the hold and getting her ankle worked on by Purrazzo. Yung applies the bloody glove to ready the mandible claw but Purrazzo stops it and hits her with a single arm-DDT, leading to Yung being locked in a paradise lock in the ropes and Purrazzo landing a baseball slide on her. After throwing some weapons in the ring and placing a chair in the corner, Purrazzo reverses a German suplex and focuses her attacks on Yung's arm, who regains control after hitting the midsection with a kendo stick. Both women get out of the ring, with Purrazzo trapping Yung's arm in the barricade but then gets choked by some rope that Yung found under the ring. After bringing the rope and some baking sheets into the ring, Yung gets hit with a kendo stick by Purrazzo, who then goes head-first into the chair in the corner. Both women trade forearm shots before Yung hits Purrazzo with the baking sheet, who rolls outside the ring and gets hit with a pedigree on the ramp, leading Yung to drag her back into the ring for a two count. Purrazzo gets out of the "Panic Switch" and blocks the red mist with a canvas before smashing it on Yung's head. Purrazzo puts a chair around Yung's neck and applies the "Venus de Milo" on her, causing Yung to briefly pass out. Yung locks the mandible claw on Purrazzo and passes out, who then gets choked with the rope in the corner. Purrazzo escapes and hits Yung with the "Cosa Nostra" to win the title for a second time.

=== Main event ===
In the main event, Rich Swann defended the Impact World Championship against Sami Callihan. Swann gets the upper hand on Callihan with some blows to the corner and turns his submission into a pin attempt for two. Callihan utilizes mind games by going in and out of the ring, and catches Swann by throwing him into the steps and ring post. After escaping a powerbomb, Swann delivers a cannonball to Callihan from the apron, and brings him back in the ring. The two exchange shots to one another, but Swann tweaks his knee after a backflip, giving Callihan the opening to target the injury with a modified anklelock. More attacks are traded between the two, eventually knocking each other out with double pump kicks. Swann rises to his feet first, laying the offense on Callihan before delivering a Rolling Thunder onto him for a two count. Callihan fights back with a Buckle Bomb followed by a brainbuster, but Swann kicks out at two. Callihan hits a tombstone package piledriver for another two count, leading him to land another piledriver on the apron, but Swann surprises him with the "Lethal Injection" on the outside. Both men are in the ring, Swann goes to the top rope but spots Ken Shamrock on the ramp, followed by Eddie Edwards who takes him away from the ring. Swann finishes Callihan with four kicks to retain his title.

== Reception ==
Steve Cook of 411Mania reviewed the event and gave it a 7.5 out of 10, which was higher than last year's event that got a 6.9 out of 10. He complained about the Brian Myers-Swoggle match but gave praise to the World Tag Team and Knockouts title changes, concluding with: "I have to say that Impact met my expectations for this evening. Everything I thought would be good was good. There weren't any surprises like we had with the Bound For Glory show. That [show] had some curveballs Impact had to react to, this one didn't." Darrin Lilly of PWTorch was also positive towards the event being "noteworthy", praising the two title changes, Doering's debut, and the clean main event win for starting Swann's reign "on a good note", saying: "Turning Point was an enjoyable show that was fun to watch. The Impact Plus specials usually deliver a good show and this was no exception." Bob Kapur of Slam Wrestling also gave praise to both title changes and called the Impact World Title bout "a good hard-hitting match", but felt the rest of the event didn't differentiate itself from Impact's weekly TV programming. He gave it 3.5 out of 5 stars and wrote: "[T]he matches on the show were mainly good, and the title matches were logical continuations or endings to storylines that were well-developed. The rest of the card seemed to be a hodge-podge of TV matches that didn't really serve to accomplish much. This would have been a fine episode of TV, but as a "special event", it didn't quite live up to the billing."

Ringside News reported that Impact Plus subscribers were unable to log onto the streaming platform to watch the event. Four days later, Impact Wrestling made the event available for free on their YouTube channel.

== Aftermath ==
On the following episode of Impact!, Moose and Willie Mack had a rematch that was no disqualification rules, with the former winning after repeatedly hitting forearm shots to the latter while unconscious. On the December 15 episode of Impact!, Moose called out Impact World Champion Rich Swann but got Mack instead, furious that a referee decided when he was done and challenged Moose to an "I quit" match at Genesis, so that he can decide if he's finished.

On the November 24 episode of Impact!, Deonna Purrazzo and Kimber Lee were confronted by a returning Susie and then attacked by Su Yung. The following week, Purrazzo made a deal with Father James Mitchell and called out Yung on the December 1 episode of Impact!, taking her out with the "Cosa Nostra" and was carried out by the undead bridesmaids. Purrazzo then entered into a feud with Rosemary and Taya Valkyrie, after they eliminated her and Lee in the first round of the Impact Knockouts Tag Team Tournament on the following week's Impact!, and was forced to defend her Knockouts title against Rosemary at Final Resolution.

On the November 24 episode of Impact!, Rich Swann successfully defended the Impact World Championship against Ken Shamrock. The following week, Moose attacked Willie Mack after his match against Chris Bey, prompting Mack's friend Swann to save him. Bey then hits Swann with the "Art of Finesse" following Moose's beatdown. After the incident, Impact announced that Swann will defend the title against Bey at Final Resolution.

Rohit Raju issued another Defeat Rohit Challenge on the November 24 episode of Impact!, which was answered by Suicide when he appeared, but Raju changed it into a non-title bout. During the match, he unmasked Suicide thinking it was TJP but the latter appeared and confused Raju, who was pinned by Crazzy Steve under the Suicide guise. The following week, Raju would defeat Steve to successfully retain his X Division title. On the December 8 episode of Impact!, Raju ridiculed TJP for losing his match against Brian Myers, and announced that the final Defeat Rohit Challenge of 2020 will take place at Final Resolution.

== Results ==
No.	Results	Stipulations	Times
1	Eddie Edwards defeated Daivari by pinfall	Singles match	11:25
2	Rosemary and Taya Valkyrie defeated Tenille Dashwood and Jordynne Grace (with Kaleb with a K) by pinfall	Tag team match	8:13
3	Brian Myers defeated Swoggle by pinfall	Singles match	8:19
4	Chris Sabin and James Storm defeated XXXL (Acey Romero and Larry D) by pinfall	Tag team match	11:34
5	Rohit Raju (c) defeated Cousin Jake (with Cody Deaner) by pinfall	Singles match for the Impact X Division Championship	7:10
6	Willie Mack defeated Moose (c) by disqualification	Singles match for the unsanctioned TNA World Heavyweight Championship	12:21
7	The Good Brothers (Doc Gallows and Karl Anderson) defeated The North (Ethan Page and Josh Alexander) (c) by pinfall	Tag team match for the Impact World Tag Team Championship	12:54
8	Deonna Purrazzo defeated Su Yung (c) by pinfall	No Disqualification match for the Impact Knockouts Championship	14:46
9	Rich Swann (c) defeated Sami Callihan by pinfall	Singles match for the Impact World Championship	21:10
(c) / – the champion(s) heading into the match
