= TNA Turning Point (2015) =

Turning Point (2015)
- Promotion: Total Nonstop Action Wrestling
- Date: July 28, 2015 (aired August 19, 2015)
- City: Orlando, Florida
- Venue: Impact Zone
- Attendance: 1,100
- Tagline: Live and Free on Destination America

Turning Point chronology
← Previous; 2013	Next → 2016

Impact Wrestling special episodes chronology
← Previous; No Surrender	Next → Lockdown

The 2015 Turning Point (also known as Impact Wrestling: Turning Point) was a professional wrestling event produced by Total Nonstop Action Wrestling (TNA). It took place at the Impact Zone in Orlando, Florida on July 28, 2015. It was the eleventh event under the Turning Point chronology. It was featured as a special edition of TNA's weekly broadcast of Impact Wrestling on Destination America on August 19, 2015.

Five professional wrestling matches were contested at the event. In the main event, Ethan Carter III successfully defended the World Heavyweight Championship against P. J. Black. On the undercard, Drew Galloway defeated Eli Drake in a no disqualification match, Gail Kim defeated The Dollhouse (Marti Bell and Jade) in a 2-on-1 Handicap Six Sides of Steel match and Mr. Anderson defeated Bram in an Open Mic Challenge.

== Storylines ==
Turning Point featured professional wrestling matches that involve different wrestlers from pre-existing scripted feuds and storylines. Wrestlers portray villains, heroes, or less distinguishable characters in the scripted events that build tension and culminate in a wrestling match or series of matches.

== Event ==
=== Preliminary matches ===
The event kicked off with an Open Mic Challenge between Mr. Anderson and Bram. Bram retrieved the mic and tried to hit Anderson with it but missed and Anderson nailed a Mic Check to Bram onto the chairs for the win.

Next, Gail Kim took on The Dollhouse (Marti Bell and Jade) in a 2-on-1 Handicap Six Sides of Steel match. Bell accidentally nailed a diving crossbody to Jade which was intended for Kim, allowing Kim to nail an Eat Defeat for the win.

Later, Drew Galloway took on Eli Drake in a no disqualification match. Near the end of the match, Drake placed Galloway on a table and tried to dive onto him off the top rope but Galloway kicked him and nailed a Celtic Cross to Drake from the top rope onto the table for the win.

After the match, Gail Kim and Velvet Sky handcuffed Taryn Terrell to a pole to attack her backstage. It was followed by a segment in the ring in which Eric Young confronted Chris Melendez where Melendez demanded a rematch with Young and Young accepted on the condition that Young must put his leg on the line and Melendez accepted the challenge.

In the penultimate match, Matt Hardy took on Tyrus. Hardy nailed two consecutive Twists of Fate to Tyrus for the win. Ethan Carter III attacked Hardy after the match.

=== Main event match ===
In the main event, Ethan Carter III defended the World Heavyweight Championship against Global Force Wrestling representative, the King of the Mountain Champion P. J. Black. EC3 crotched Black on the top rope and nailed a One Percenter to retain the title.

== Results ==
No.	Results	Stipulations	Times
1	Mr. Anderson defeated Bram	Open Mic Challenge	9:13
2	Gail Kim defeated The Dollhouse (Marti Bell and Jade)	2-on-1 Handicap Six Sides of Steel match	12:43
3	Drew Galloway defeated Eli Drake	No Disqualification match	9:45
4	Matt Hardy defeated Tyrus	Singles match	2:13
5	Ethan Carter III (c) defeated P. J. Black	Singles match for the TNA World Heavyweight Championship	8:25
(c) / – the champion(s) heading into the match
