= Impact Wrestling Turning Point (2019) =

Turning Point (2019)
- Promotional poster featuring various Impact wrestlers
- Promotion(s): Impact Wrestling; Pennsylvania Premiere Wrestling
- Date: November 9, 2019
- City: Hazleton, Pennsylvania
- Venue: Holy Family Academy

Impact Plus Monthly Specials chronology
← Previous; Prelude to Glory	Next → No Surrender

Turning Point chronology
← Previous; 2016	Next → 2020

The 2019 Turning Point was a professional wrestling event produced by Impact Wrestling in conjunction with Pennsylvania Premiere Wrestling. The event was streamed live on Impact Plus and took place on November 9, 2019, at the Holy Family Academy in Hazleton, Pennsylvania. It was the 13th event in the Turning Point chronology and the first to be held as an Impact Plus Monthly Special

Ten matches were contested at the event. In the main event, Sami Callihan successfully defended the Impact World Championship against Brian Cage. In other prominent matches, Ace Austin defeated Jake Crist to retain the Impact X Division Championship, Eddie Edwards defeated Mahabali Shera to retain his Call Your Shot Gauntlet trophy, and The North (Ethan Page and Josh Alexander) defeated Rich Swann and Willie Mack to retain the Impact World Tag Team Championship.

== Production ==
=== Background ===
In 2013, Impact Wrestling (then known as Total Nonstop Action Wrestling) discontinued monthly pay-per-view events in favor of the pre-recorded One Night Only events. Turning Point was produced as a PPV from 2004 until 2012. On October 13, 2019, Impact Wrestling announced on its website that Turning Point would return as a monthly special for Impact Plus and would be taking place on November 9.

=== Storylines ===
At Bound for Glory, Brian Cage defeated Sami Callihan in a no disqualification match to retain the Impact World Championship. During This is IMPACT!, a special episode of Impact's weekly television series, Cage was being interviewed by Josh Mathews and Scott D'Amore on his successful title defense against Callihan. Callihan interrupted Cage and demanded a rematch, showing footage of oVe members stalking Cage's house with his family inside. Cage would accept Callihan's challenge for a steel cage match on IMPACT's premiere on AXS TV. Callihan defeated Cage in the steel cage match to win the Impact World Championship. On October 30, Impact Wrestling announced that Cage was invoking his rematch clause for the World Championship against Callihan at Turning Point.

At Bound for Glory, Rob Van Dam turned on Rhino during their three-way match against The North and the team of Rich Swann and Willie Mack for the Impact World Tag Team Championship. This led to RVD turn into a villain and explained his betrayal on the October 29 episode of Impact Wrestling that no one stole his finishing move which led to Rhino confronting him and challenging him to a match at Turning Point.

At Bound for Glory, Ace Austin won a five-man ladder match to win the X Division Championship, setting up a title match between Austin and former champion Jake Crist for the X Division Championship at Turning Point.

== Reception ==
Larry Csonka of 411Mania reviewed the event and gave it a 6.9 out of 10. He wrote that: "Impact Turning Point 2019 was a pretty good show overall, with nothing bad and a nice sub-three hour run time. Production wasn't as bad as the last Impact Plus event, but they have to mic both the backstage interviews and crowd much better. It's an easy watch, but far from a must–see show."

== Results ==
No.	Results	Stipulations	Times
1	Jordynne Grace and Tessa Blanchard defeated Havok and Madison Rayne	Tag team match	06:23
2	Clutch Adams (c) defeated Charles Mason, Desean Pratt, Evander James, Facade (with Dani Mo) and KC Navarro	6-way Scramble match for the PPW Heavyweight Championship	08:33
3	Michael Elgin defeated Mike Orlando (with Mr. Martinez)	Singles match	11:17
4	Moose defeated Fallah Bahh	Singles match	09:38
5	Taya Valkyrie (with John E. Bravo) defeated Tenille Dashwood	Singles match	12:36
6	The North (Ethan Page and Josh Alexander) (c) defeated Rich Swann and Willie Mack	Tag team match for the Impact World Tag Team Championship	13:46
7	Eddie Edwards defeated Mahabali Shera	Singles match for possession of Edwards' Call Your Shot Gauntlet Trophy	08:36
8	Ace Austin (c) defeated Jake Crist	Singles match for the Impact X Division Championship	10:38
9	Rob Van Dam (with Katie Forbes) defeated Rhino by disqualification	Singles match	07:33
10	Sami Callihan (c) defeated Brian Cage	Singles match for the Impact World Championship	14:31
(c) / – the champion(s) heading into the match
