= TNA Turning Point (2016) =

Turning Point (2016)
- Promotion: Total Nonstop Action Wrestling
- Date: August 12, 2016 (aired August 25, 2016)
- City: Orlando, Florida, U.S.
- Venue: Impact Zone
- Attendance: 1,100
- Tagline: Live and Free on Pop

Turning Point chronology
← Previous; 2015	Next → 2019

Impact Wrestling special episodes chronology
← Previous; Destination X	Next → Delete or Decay

The 2016 Turning Point (also known as Impact Wrestling: Turning Point) was a professional wrestling event produced by Total Nonstop Action Wrestling (TNA). And it took place at the Impact Zone in Orlando, Florida on August 12, 2016. It was the twelfth event under the Turning Point chronology. It was featured as a special edition of TNA's weekly broadcast of Impact Wrestling on Pop on August 25, 2016.

Four professional wrestling matches were contested at the event. In the main event, Ethan Carter III took on Drew Galloway to determine the #1 contender for the World Heavyweight Championship at Bound for Glory. EC3 won to earn the title shot. On the undercard, Allie defeated the champion Sienna and the other three participants Marti Bell, Madison Rayne and Jade in a five-way match to win the Knockouts Championship, Abyss defeated Brother Nero in a match and Mike Bennett won battle royal to become the #1 contender for the World Heavyweight Championship.

== Storylines ==
Turning Point featured professional wrestling matches that involve different wrestlers from pre-existing scripted feuds and storylines. Wrestlers portray villains, heroes, or less distinguishable characters in the scripted events that build tension and culminate in a wrestling match or series of matches.

== Event ==
=== Preliminary matches ===
The event kicked off with an open invitational battle royal to determine the #1 contender for the World Heavyweight Championship. Mike Bennett, Baron Dax, Mahabali Shera, Robbie E, Basile Baraka, Grado, Eli Drake, Jessie Godderz, Moose and Eddie Edwards were the participants in the match. Grado hit a bionic elbow to Dax, allowing Baraka to eliminate him. Moose then eliminated Shera by avoiding a punch by him and tossing him over the top rope. Baraka then eliminated Robbie E. Moose then grabbed Baraka by his neck and eliminated him. Grado tried to hit a jumping DDT to Drake and Rrake crotched him on the ropes and eliminated him in the process. Drake then charged at Edwards, who tossed him over the top rope to eliminate him. Moose then eliminated Godderz. Edwards tried to nail a diving hurricanrana to Moose but Moose countered into powerbombing him over the top rope and Mike Bennett simultaneously tossed both of them over the top rope for the win.

After the match, Matt Hardy cut a promo regarding his World Tag Team Championship contract and declared that he and Brother Nero needed to win the titles from Decay. Decay interrupted them and Abyss challenged Nero to a match and Nero hit a baseball slide to Abyss through the ropes and hit a plancha to Abyss, leading to a match between Nero and Abyss. Rosemary spit mist into Nero as Nero was on the top rope, allowing Abyss to hit a Black Hole Slam to Nero for the win.

This was followed by the penultimate match, in which Sienna defended the Knockouts Championship against Allie, Marti Bell, Madison Rayne and Jade in a five-way match. Bell tried to use her baton but Allie prevented her from using it and accidentally struck Sienna with it and then Bell hit Allie with the baton, who fell down on top of Rayne, who was knocked out with a package piledriver by Jade. This resulted in Allie pinning Rayne to win the Knockouts Championship.

After the match, Eli Drake hosted a Fact of Life interview segment, in which he interviewed all the participants of the X Division, who would be participating in the following week's X Division Gauntlet for the X Division Championship. DJ Z knocked out all the X Division wrestlers outside the ring and grabbed the X Division Championship title belt while Drake retreated from the ring.

=== Main event match ===
In the main event, Drew Galloway took on Ethan Carter III to determine the #1 contender for the World Heavyweight Championship at Bound for Glory, with Aron Rex serving as the special guest referee. Carter countered a Future Shock by Galloway into a jackknife pin for the win. Galloway turned into a villain after the match by attacking Rex blaming him for the loss.

== Results ==
No.	Results	Stipulations	Times
1	Mike Bennett won by last eliminating Moose and Eddie Edwards (Note: Order of elimination: Baron Dax, Mahabali Shera, Robbie E, Basile Baraka, Grado, Eli Drake, Jessie Godderz, Moose and Eddie Edwards.)	Battle royal to determine the #1 contender for the TNA World Heavyweight Championship	12:30
2	Abyss (with Rosemary and Crazzy Steve) defeated Brother Nero (with Matt Hardy)	Singles match	10:00
3	Allie defeated Sienna (c), Marti Bell, Madison Rayne and Jade	Five-way match for the TNA Knockouts Championship	5:05
4	Ethan Carter III defeated Drew Galloway	Singles match to determine the #1 contender for the TNA World Heavyweight Championship at Bound for Glory, with Aron Rex as the special guest referee	14:40
(c) / – the champion(s) heading into the match
