= Final Resolution =

TNA professional wrestling event series

- TNA Final Resolution logo
- Promotions: Total Nonstop Action Wrestling
- First event: Final Resolution (2005)
- Last event: Final Resolution (2025)

Final Resolution was a professional wrestling TNA+ event held by Total Nonstop Action Wrestling in December. Initially introduced as a pay-per-view by TNA in 2005, the event originally took place in January until 2008, when TNA moved the event to December of that year, with two Final Resolutions took place that year. On January 11, 2013, TNA announced that only four PPVs would be produced that year, with Final Resolution among the titles dropped. It would be produced as a special episode of TNA's weekly television program Impact Wrestling in 2013 and was revived as a monthly special for Impact Plus in 2020.

== Events ==
#	Event	Date	Location	Arena	Main Event	Ref(s)
1	Final Resolution (2005)	January 16, 2005	Orlando, Florida	Impact Zone	Jeff Jarrett (c) vs. Monty Brown for the NWA World Heavyweight Championship	
2	Final Resolution (2006)	January 15, 2006	Orlando, Florida	Impact Zone	Christian Cage and Sting vs. Jeff Jarrett and Monty Brown in a Tag Team match	
3	Final Resolution (2007)	January 14, 2007	Orlando, Florida	Impact Zone	Abyss (c) vs. Christian Cage vs Sting in a Three Way Elimination match for the NWA World Heavyweight Championship	
4	Final Resolution (January 2008)	January 6, 2008	Orlando, Florida	Impact Zone	Kurt Angle (c) vs. Christian Cage for the TNA World Heavyweight Championship	
5	Final Resolution (December 2008)	December 7, 2008	Orlando, Florida	Impact Zone	The Main Event Mafia (TNA World Heavyweight Champion Sting, Booker T, Kevin Nash, and Scott Steiner) vs. The TNA Front Line (A.J. Styles, Brother Devon, Brother Ray, and Samoa Joe) in an Eight Man Tag Team Match for the TNA World Heavyweight Championship	
6	Final Resolution (2009)	December 20, 2009	Orlando, Florida	Impact Zone	A.J. Styles (c) vs. Daniels for the TNA World Heavyweight Championship	
7	Final Resolution (2010)	December 5, 2010	Orlando, Florida	Impact Zone	Jeff Hardy (c) vs. Matt Morgan for the TNA World Heavyweight Championship with Mr. Anderson as Special Guest Referee	
8	Final Resolution (2011)	December 11, 2011	Orlando, Florida	Impact Zone	Bobby Roode (c) vs. A.J. Styles in a 30 minute Iron Man match for the TNA World Heavyweight Championship	
9	Final Resolution (2012)	December 9, 2012	Orlando, Florida	Impact Zone	Jeff Hardy (c) vs. Bobby Roode for the TNA World Heavyweight Championship	
10	Final Resolution (2013)	December 19, 2013	Orlando, Florida	Impact Zone	Magnus vs. Jeff Hardy in a Dixieland match in the tournament final for the vacant TNA World Heavyweight Championship	
11	Final Resolution (2020)	December 12, 2020	Nashville, Tennessee	Skyway Studios	Rich Swann (c) vs. Chris Bey for the Impact World Championship	
12	Final Resolution (2023)	December 9, 2023	Toronto, Ontario, Canada	Don Kolov Arena	Josh Alexander and Zack Sabre Jr. vs. The Motor City Machine Guns (Alex Shelley and Chris Sabin)	
13	Final Resolution (2024)	December 13, 2024	Atlanta, Georgia	Center Stage	Nic Nemeth (c) vs. A. J. Francis for the TNA World Championship	
14	Final Resolution (2025)	December 5, 2025	El Paso, Texas	El Paso County Coliseum	Frankie Kazarian (c) vs. JDC for the TNA World Championship	
(c) - refers to the champion prior to the match
