= Final Resolution (December 2008) =

2008 Total Nonstop Action Wrestling pay-per-view event

- Promotional poster featuring The Main Event Mafia
- Promotion: Total Nonstop Action Wrestling
- Date: December 7, 2008
- City: Orlando, Florida
- Venue: TNA Impact! Zone
- Attendance: 1,200
- Tagline: "Respect is Earned"

Pay-per-view chronology
← Previous; Turning Point	Next → Genesis

Final Resolution chronology
← Previous; January 2008	Next → 2009

The December 2008 Final Resolution was a professional wrestling pay-per-view (PPV) event produced by Total Nonstop Action Wrestling (TNA), which took place on December 7, 2008 at the TNA Impact! Zone in Orlando, Florida. It was the fifth event under the Final Resolution chronology and second Final Resolution event to take place in 2008. Final Resolution was usually held in January; in early October 2008 TNA moved the event to December. As a result of TNA's decision, two Final Resolution events took place in 2008; the other was in January.

== Storylines ==
Other on-screen personnel
Role:	Name:
Commentator	Mike Tenay
Commentator	Don West
Interviewer	Jeremy Borash
Interviewer	Lauren Thompson
Ring announcer	Jeremy Borash
Ring announcer	David Penzer
Referee	Earl Hebner
Referee	Rudy Charles
Referee	Mark Johnson
Referee	Andrew Thomas

Final Resolution featured seven professional wrestling matches that involved different wrestlers from pre-existing scripted feuds and storylines. Wrestlers portrayed villains, heroes, or less distinguishable characters in the scripted events that built tension and culminated in a wrestling match or series of matches.

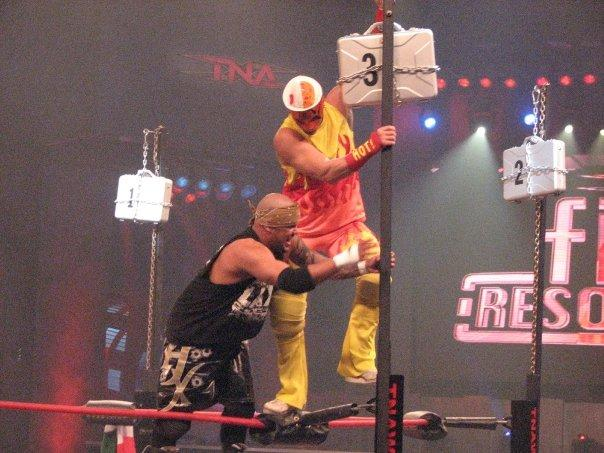
Homicide and Curry Man in the Feast or Fired match

== Results ==
No.	Results	Stipulations	Times
1	Curry Man, Hernandez, Homicide and Jay Lethal defeated Alex Shelley, B.G. James, Chris Sabin, Consequences Creed, Cute Kip, Jimmy Rave, Lance Rock, Sonjay Dutt and Shark Boy	Feast or Fired match	12:10
2	ODB, Roxxi and Taylor Wilde defeated The Beautiful People (Angelina Love and Velvet Sky) and Sharmell (with Cute Kip)	Six-knockout tag team match	7:27
3	Eric Young defeated Sheik Abdul Bashir (c)	Singles match for the TNA X Division Championship	8:05
4	Christy Hemme defeated Awesome Kong (c) by disqualification	Singles match for the TNA Women's Knockout Championship	5:05
5	Beer Money, Inc. (James Storm and Robert Roode) (c) (with Jacqueline) defeated Abyss and Matt Morgan	Tag team match for the TNA World Tag Team Championship	11:35
6	Kurt Angle defeated Rhino	Singles match with Mick Foley as special guest enforcer Since Angle won, he got a rematch with Jeff Jarrett at Genesis, had Rhino won, Angle would have been fired from TNA.	14:24
7	The Main Event Mafia (Booker T, Kevin Nash, Scott Steiner and Sting) (with Sharmell) (c) defeated The TNA Front Line (A.J. Styles, Brother Devon, Brother Ray and Samoa Joe)	Eight-man tag team match for the TNA World Heavyweight Championship; Had The TNA Front Line won, Styles would have won the championship.	21:24
(c) / – the champion(s) heading into the match
