= Final Resolution (2011) =

2011 Total Nonstop Action Wrestling pay-per-view event

- Promotional poster featuring Bobby Roode
- Promotion: Total Nonstop Action Wrestling
- Date: December 11, 2011
- City: Orlando, Florida
- Venue: Impact Zone
- Attendance: 1,100

Pay-per-view chronology
← Previous; Turning Point	Next → Genesis

Final Resolution chronology
← Previous; 2010	Next → 2012

The 2011 Final Resolution was a professional wrestling pay-per-view event produced by the Total Nonstop Action Wrestling (TNA) promotion, which took place on December 11, 2011 at the Impact Wrestling Zone in Orlando, Florida. It was the eighth event under the Final Resolution chronology.

In October 2017, with the launch of the Global Wrestling Network, the event became available to stream on demand.

== Storylines ==
Other on-screen personnel
Commentator	Mike Tenay
Commentator	Taz
Ring announcer	Jeremy Borash
Referee	Rudy Charles
Referee	Mark "Slick" Johnson
Referee	Andrew Thomas
Interviewers	Jeremy Borash

Final Resolution featured eight professional wrestling matches that involved different wrestlers from pre-existing scripted feuds and storylines. Wrestlers portrayed villains, heroes, or less distinguishable characters in the scripted events that built tension and culminated in a wrestling match or series of matches.

== Results ==
No.	Results	Stipulations	Times
1	Rob Van Dam defeated Christopher Daniels	Singles match	09:45
2	Robbie E (c) (with Robbie T) defeated Eric Young	Singles match for the TNA Television Championship	07:30
3	Crimson and Matt Morgan (c) defeated D'Angelo Dinero and Devon	Tag team match for the TNA World Tag Team Championship	09:45
4	Austin Aries (c) defeated Kid Kash	Singles match for the TNA X Division Championship	12:45
5	Gail Kim (c) defeated Mickie James	Singles match for the TNA Women's Knockout Championship	07:45
6	James Storm defeated Kurt Angle	Singles match	17:30
7	Jeff Hardy (with Sting) defeated Jeff Jarrett (with Karen Jarrett)	Loser Leaves TNA Steel Cage match (Note: Sting and Karen were handcuffed to each other at ringside. Since Hardy won, he earned a TNA World Heavyweight Championship match at Genesis, and both Jeff and Karen Jarrett were fired from TNA. Had Jarrett won, Hardy would have been fired.)	09:45
8	Bobby Roode (c) vs. A.J. Styles ended in a 3–3 draw	30-Minute Iron Man match for the TNA World Heavyweight Championship	30:00
(c) / – the champion(s) heading into the match

=== Iron Man match ===
Score		Point winner	Decision	Notes	Time
Roode	Styles	Point winner	Decision	Notes	Time
1	0	Bobby Roode	Pinfall	Roode pinned Styles with a schoolboy	10:00
2	0	Bobby Roode	Submission	Roode submitted Styles to a figure-four leglock	15:20
2	1	A.J. Styles	Submission	Styles submitted Roode to an arm-trap crossface	17:40
2	2	A.J. Styles	Pinfall	Styles pinned Roode with an inside cradle	20:00
2	3	A.J. Styles	Pinfall	Styles pinned Roode after Superman	23:00
3	3	Bobby Roode	Pinfall	Roode pinned Styles with a double leg cradle while holding the ropes	25:00
