= TNA Against All Odds (2007) =

2007 Total Nonstop Action Wrestling pay-per-view event

Against All Odds (2007)
- DVD cover featuring Kurt Angle and Christian Cage
- Promotion: Total Nonstop Action Wrestling
- Date: February 11, 2007
- City: Orlando, Florida
- Venue: Impact Zone
- Attendance: 900

Pay-per-view chronology
← Previous; Final Resolution	Next → Destination X

Against All Odds chronology
← Previous; 2006	Next → 2008

The 2007 Against All Odds was a professional wrestling pay-per-view (PPV) event produced by Total Nonstop Action Wrestling (TNA), which took place on February 11, 2007, at the Impact Zone in Orlando, Florida. It was the third event under the Against All Odds chronology.

Ten matches were contested at the event, including one on the pre-show. In the main event, Christian Cage defeated Kurt Angle to retain the NWA World Heavyweight Championship. In other prominent matches, Sting defeated Abyss in a Prison Yard match, Chris Sabin defeated Jerry Lynn to retain the TNA X Division Championship and AJ Styles defeated Rhino in a Motor City Chain match.

== Storylines ==
The event featured professional wrestling matches that involve different wrestlers from pre-existing scripted feuds and storylines. Professional wrestlers portray villains, heroes, or less distinguishable characters in the scripted events that build tension and culminate in a wrestling match or series of matches.

== Event ==
Other on-screen personnel
Role:	Name:
Commentator	Mike Tenay
Commentator	Don West
Interviewer	Jeremy Borash
Ring announcer	Jeremy Borash
Ring announcer	David Penzer
Referee	Earl Hebner
Referee	Rudy Charles
Referee	Mark "Slick" Johnson
Referee	Andrew Thomas

Prior to the start of the pay-per-view there was a dark match that saw Serotonin (Kazarian and Havok) defeat Jay Lethal and Sonjay Dutt, when Kazarian pinned Dutt.

The pay-per-view itself started with a Little Italy Street Fight between the Latin American Xchange (Homicide and Hernandez) and Team 3D (Brother Ray and Brother Devon). Prior to the start of the match, there were small tables set up in the ring to represent an Italian bistro. Devon hit a reverse DDT on Hernandez, but Hernandez kicked out at 2. He was then able to hit Devon with the Border Toss to pick up the victory.

The next match saw Senshi defeat Austin Starr, after missing a Warriors Way from the top, followed by a chickenwing. After the match, Starr begins filling the ring with chairs. He then grabbed the mic and started complaining about the match. Bob Backlund came out and put his own chickenwing on Starr before dragging him to the back.

The following match was a Tuxedo match between Christy Hemme and the "Big Fat Oily Guy". Christy ultimately won the match when she removed the trousers of the "Big Fat Oily Guy” to reveal an ill-fitting G-string.

The next match was a "Basebrawl" match between Lance Hoyt and Dale Torborg. Hoyt came to the ring for the match with David Eckstein and Torborg came out with A. J. Pierzynski. Hoyt picked up the win after Eckstein hit Torborg with a steel chair.

Next was a strap match labelled as a "Motor City Chain match". This match saw A.J. Styles face off against Rhino. The match was set up with the chain and a pole in two corners, one with a key and one with a nightstick. Styles picked up the victory after Rhino attempted to Gore him through the table, but Styles moved out of the way and Rhino went through the table.

The TNA X Division Championship match was next, seeing Chris Sabin successfully defending his title against Jerry Lynn. During the match, Sabin hit Lynn with a Spiralbomb which injured his back. When Lynn later went for a piledriver, his back gave out, forcing him to drop Sabin. Sabin used this opportunity to capitalize and pick up the victory, covering Lynn while using the ropes for leverage.

The next match was a mixed tag team match which saw James Storm and Jacqueline Moore take on Petey Williams and Gail Kim. While Kim had Moore rolled up, Storm kicked Kim in the face, enabling Moore to cover her and pick up the victory. After the match, Storm went to hit Williams with a beer bottle, but he was able to avoid it. Storm then hit Williams with a superkick and Moore then jumped on Williams’ back followed by a DDT. As they attempted to hit him with a Death Sentence, Chris Harris made his return and ran in to make the save.

The second to last match was a Prison Yard match between Sting and Abyss. Inside the ring was a cage, and the first person to lock their opponent in the cage would be declared the winner. When James Mitchell interfered, Sting put him in the Scorpion Deathlock, which gave Abyss the opportunity to attack him from behind. Abyss then picked up Sting and put him through a table. Sting then put a barbwire board on the table and powerbombed Abyss off the cage and through the barbwire. Sting then put Abyss in the cage to pick up the victory.

The final match saw the NWA World Heavyweight Championship being defended, when Christian Cage took on the challenger Kurt Angle. Tomko, who came out to the ring with Cage, was ejected prior to the match. After he left, Samoa Joe came out with a chair and sat on the ramp to watch the match. During the match, Tomko came back out and attacked Joe while Scott Steiner came out and began attacking Angle. Joe eventually dove from the ring onto Steiner and Tomko outside the ring, and the three fought to the back. In the ensuing chaos, the referee was knocked down, which enabled Cage to hit Angle with a steel pipe. He then hit Angle with the Unprettier and pinned him to retain the title.

== Results ==
No.	Results	Stipulations	Times
1^{P}	Serotonin (Kazarian and Havok) (with Maverick Matt) defeated Jay Lethal and Sonjay Dutt	Tag team match	5:14
2	Latin American Xchange (Homicide and Hernandez) defeated Team 3D (Brother Ray and Brother Devon)	Little Italy Street Fight	9:26
3	Senshi defeated Austin Starr	Singles match	8:21
4	Christy Hemme defeated "Big Fat Oily Guy"	Tuxedo match	2:29
5	Lance Hoyt (with David Eckstein) defeated Dale Torborg (with A. J. Pierzynski)	Basebrawl match	5:04
6	A.J. Styles defeated Rhino	Motor City Chain match	15:07
7	Chris Sabin (c) defeated Jerry Lynn	Singles match for the TNA X Division Championship	13:33
8	James Storm and Jacqueline Moore defeated Petey Williams and Gail Kim	Mixed tag team match	8:49
9	Sting defeated Abyss (with James Mitchell)	Prison Yard match	11:57
10	Christian Cage (c) defeated Kurt Angle	Singles match for the NWA World Heavyweight Championship	19:04
(c) / – the champion(s) heading into the match; P / – the match was broadcast on the pre-show
