= Final Resolution (2010) =

2010 Total Nonstop Action Wrestling pay-per-view event

- Promotional poster featuring Fortune
- Promotion: Total Nonstop Action Wrestling
- Date: December 5, 2010
- City: Orlando, Florida
- Venue: Impact Zone
- Attendance: 1,100

Pay-per-view chronology
← Previous; Turning Point	Next → Genesis

Final Resolution chronology
← Previous; 2009	Next → 2011

The 2010 Final Resolution was an American professional wrestling pay-per-view (PPV) event produced by the Total Nonstop Action Wrestling (TNA) professional wrestling promotion, that took place on December 5, 2010 at the Impact Zone in Orlando, Florida. It was the seventh event under the Final Resolution chronology.

In October 2017, with the launch of the Global Wrestling Network, the event became available to stream on demand.

Final Resolution featured nine professional wrestling matches that involved different wrestlers from pre-existing scripted feuds and storylines. Wrestlers portrayed villains, heroes, or less distinguishable characters in the scripted events that built tension and culminated in a wrestling match or series of matches.

== Results ==
No.	Results	Stipulations	Times
1	Beer Money, Inc. (James Storm and Robert Roode) defeated Ink Inc. (Jesse Neal and Shannon Moore)	Tag team match to determine #1 contenders for the TNA World Tag Team Championship	10:45
2	Tara defeated Mickie James	Falls Count Anywhere match	10:25
3	Robbie E (c) defeated Jay Lethal by disqualification	Singles match for the TNA X Division Championship	08:11
4	Rob Van Dam defeated Rhino	First Blood match	12:24
5	Douglas Williams defeated A.J. Styles (c)	Singles match for the TNA Television Championship	14:50
6	The Motor City Machine Guns (c) (Alex Shelley and Chris Sabin) defeated Generation Me (Jeremy and Max Buck)	Full Metal Mayhem match for the TNA World Tag Team Championship	16:27
7	Abyss defeated D'Angelo Dinero	Casket match	11:40
8	Jeff Jarrett defeated Samoa Joe	Submission match	09:05
9	Jeff Hardy (c) defeated Matt Morgan	No Disqualification match for the TNA World Heavyweight Championship with Mr. Anderson as special guest referee	12:31
(c) / – the champion(s) heading into the match
