= Final Resolution (2024) =

2024 TNA Wrestling event

- Promotional poster
- Promotion: Total Nonstop Action Wrestling
- Date: December 13, 2024
- City: Atlanta, Georgia
- Venue: Center Stage

TNA+ Monthly Specials chronology
← Previous; Turning Point	Next → Sacrifice

Final Resolution chronology
← Previous; 2023	Next → 2025

The 2024 Final Resolution was a professional wrestling event produced by Total Nonstop Action Wrestling. It took place on December 13, 2024, at Center Stage in Atlanta, Georgia, and aired on TNA+. It was the 13th event under the Final Resolution chronology.

Ten matches were contested at the event, including two on the Countdown to Final Resolution pre-show. In the main event, Nic Nemeth defeated A. J. Francis to retain the TNA World Championship. In other prominent matches, The Hardys (Matt Hardy and Jeff Hardy) defeated The System (Brian Myers and Eddie Edwards) in a tables match to retain the TNA World Tag Team Championship, Masha Slamovich defeated Tasha Steelz in a Falls Count Anywhere match to retain the TNA Knockouts World Championship, and Joe Hendry defeated Josh Alexander, Mike Santana and Steve Maclin in a four-way match to become the #1 contender to the TNA World Championship at Genesis. The event also featured the return of former CMLL wrestler Tessa Blanchard, who had been terminated from her TNA contract in June 2020.

== Production ==
=== Background ===
Final Resolution was a pay-per-view (PPV) event produced by Total Nonstop Action Wrestling between 2005 and 2012. In 2013, TNA discontinued most of its monthly pay-per-view events in favor of the pre-recorded One Night Only events. The event would be held as a special episode of Impact! in 2013, and has been a monthly special for Impact Plus in 2020 and 2023. On July 22, 2024, it was announced that Final Resolution would take place on December 13, at Center Stage in Atlanta, Georgia.

=== Storylines ===
The event featured several professional wrestling matches that involved different wrestlers from pre-existing scripted feuds, plots, and storylines. Wrestlers portrayed heroes, villains, or less distinguishable characters in scripted events that build tension and culminate in a wrestling match or series of matches. Storylines were produced on TNA's weekly programs, Impact! and Xplosion.

At Victory Road, Masha Slamovich teamed with Tasha Steelz as they defended the TNA Knockouts World Tag Team Championship against Spitfire (Dani Luna and Jody Threat); Slamovich's regular partner Alisha Edwards was declared medically unable to compete, hence Steelz' involvement. Spitfire went on to win the titles, with Steelz and Edwards turning on and attacking Slamovich after the match. Slamovich would continue feuding with Steelz and Edwards, during which she captured the TNA Knockouts World Championship from Jordynne Grace at Bound for Glory; she later defended the title against Edwards in a no disqualification match on Impact! before being attacked by Steelz. On the December 5 Impact!, Steelz defeated Grace in a singles match and then continued assaulting her alongside Edwards before Slamovich ran them off. TNA would later announce that Slamovich would defend the TNA Knockouts World Championship against Steelz at Final Resolution. On the day of the event, a backstage confrontation between Slamovich and Steelz, led to the match being made a falls count anywhere match.

At Bound for Glory, The Hardys (Matt Hardy and Jeff Hardy) won the TNA World Tag Team Championship in a Full Metal Mayhem match, defeating champions The System (Brian Myers and Eddie Edwards) and ABC (Ace Austin and Chris Bey). Over a month later on the December 5 episode of Impact!, The System would invoke their rematch clause to challenge The Hardys for the titles, only for the match to end via disqualification due to Alisha Edwards interfering. The System continued to beat down The Hardys, ending when they put the champions through a table. As a result, TNA later announced that The Hardys and The System would face off once again for the TNA World Tag Team Championship at Final Resolution in a tables match.

On the December 5 Impact!, Kushida won a five-way match against Ace Austin, Trent Seven, Leon Slater and JDC to earn a TNA X Division Championship match. Therefore, he would challenge Moose for the title at the event.

== Results ==
No.	Results	Stipulations	Times
1^{P}	JDC defeated Leon Slater by pinfall	Singles match	7:06
2^{P}	Frankie Kazarian defeated Jonathan Gresham by submission	Singles match	9:11
3	Moose (c) defeated Kushida by pinfall	Singles match for the TNA X Division Championship	10:50
4	The Rascalz (Trey Miguel and Zachary Wentz) defeated Jake Something (Note: The match was originally scheduled to be The Rascalz vs. Jake Something and Hammerstone vs. PCO and Sami Callihan, but Hammerstone was unable to compete due to an injury, and Something decided to compete on his own.) and PCO and Sami Callihan by pinfall	Three-way tag team match	11:02
5	Ace Austin defeated Trent Seven by pinfall	Singles match	12:38
6	Jordynne Grace vs. Rosemary ended in a no contest	Singles match	10:00
7	Joe Hendry defeated Josh Alexander, Mike Santana and Steve Maclin by pinfall	Four-way match to determine the #1 contender to the TNA World Championship at Genesis	18:21
8	Masha Slamovich (c) defeated Tasha Steelz by pinfall	Falls Count Anywhere match for the TNA Knockouts World Championship	12:34
9	The Hardys (Matt Hardy and Jeff Hardy) (c) defeated The System (Brian Myers and Eddie Edwards)	Tables match for the TNA World Tag Team Championship	16:50
10	Nic Nemeth (c) defeated A. J. Francis (with KC Navarro) by pinfall	Singles match for the TNA World Championship	15:13
(c) / – the champion(s) heading into the match; P / – the match was broadcast on the pre-show
