= Final Resolution (2025) =

TNA professional wrestling event

- Promotion: Total Nonstop Action Wrestling
- Date: December 5, 2025
- City: El Paso, Texas
- Venue: El Paso County Coliseum
- Attendance: 2,567

TNA+ Monthly Specials chronology
← Previous; Turning Point	Next → No Surrender

Final Resolution chronology
← Previous; 2024	Next → Last

The 2025 Final Resolution was a professional wrestling event produced by Total Nonstop Action Wrestling. It took place on December 5, 2025, at El Paso County Coliseum in El Paso, Texas. It aired on TNA+. It was the 14th event under the Final Resolution chronology. Wrestlers from WWE's NXT brand, with which TNA has a partnership, also appeared at the event.

Eleven matches were contested at the event, including two on the Countdown to Final Resolution pre-show. In the main event, Frankie Kazarian defeated JDC to retain the TNA World Championship. In other prominent matches, Leon Slater defeated A. J. Francis to retain the TNA X Division Championship, The Hardys (Matt Hardy and Jeff Hardy) defeated NXT's High Ryze (Tyson Dupont and Tyriek Igwe) to retain the TNA World Tag Team Championship, and NXT's Channing "Stacks" Lorenzo defeated Steve Maclin to win the TNA International Championship. The event also featured the TNA debuts of Bear Bronson, Brock Anderson and Dutch, the returns of C. W. Anderson and Vincent, and JDC's final Final Resolution appearance due to his retirement from professional wrestling in 2026.

== Production ==
=== Background ===
Final Resolution was a pay-per-view (PPV) event produced by Total Nonstop Action Wrestling between 2005 and 2012. In 2013, TNA discontinued most of its monthly pay-per-view events in favor of the pre-recorded One Night Only events. The event would be held as a special episode of Impact! in 2013, and has been a monthly special for Impact Plus in 2020 and 2023.

On October 1, 2025, it was announced that Final Resolution will take place on December 5, 2025, at El Paso County Coliseum in El Paso, Texas.

=== Storylines ===
The event will feature several professional wrestling matches that involved different wrestlers from pre-existing scripted feuds, plots, and storylines. Wrestlers portray heroes, villains, or less distinguishable characters in scripted events that build tension and culminate in a wrestling match or series of matches. Storylines are produced on TNA's weekly programs, Impact! and Xplosion.

On the live November 13 broadcast of TNA Impact!, Mike Santana defended the TNA World Championship against Ryan Nemeth in the main event. At the beginning of the match, Ryan's brother Nic Nemeth, who co-held the Call Your Shot Trophy, looked to invoke his guaranteed title opportunity, but was attacked by an unknown person backstage. Immediately after this, a contingent of NXT wrestlers led by Robert Stone – including Brooks Jensen, Channing "Stacks" Lorenzo, Charlie Dempsey, Lexis King, and The High Ryze (Tyson Dupont and Tyriek Igwe) – stormed the ring, ejected Ryan, and attacked Santana. Several TNA wrestlers, notably TNA International Champion Steve Maclin, attempted to run interference, but were overwhelmed by the NXT group. The assault ended with Dempsey applying an armbar on Santana's right arm before Stone stomped on it after Jensen put it inside a steel chair. Once the NXT group cleared the ring, Frankie Kazarian, the other co-holder of the Call Your Shot Trophy, invoked his opportunity and won the TNA World Championship. The following night at Turning Point, TNA Director of Authority Santino Marella stationed heavy security across the arena, declaring no one would enter or exit without proper authorization. Later, on the "Countdown" pre-show, Kazarian hosted his talk show segment, "The King's Speech," with TNA President Carlos Silva as his guest. Silva announced that TNA would conduct an internal investigation of the NXT group's invasion the previous night, which Kazarian claimed he had no part in. The Nemeths would come out to rebuff him, with Nic, who was scheduled to team with Kazarian against Santana and Maclin in the show's main event, accusing him of orchestrating the assault on him backstage; he would also declare that he would use his own Call Your Shot opportunity after their match. During the main event, Santana would be absent for a majority of the match, reportedly having been silent for the past 24 hours, with Maclin forced to fend off Kazarian and Nemeth in a handicap match. Towards the end, however, Santana would arrive at the arena and enter the match, ultimately pinning Kazarian to win it for Maclin and himself. After the match, Nemeth looked ready to invoke his opportunity, but he, along with Santana, Maclin, and even Kazarian, was attacked by the NXT invaders. Several TNA wrestlers, including TNA World Tag Team Champions The Hardys (Matt Hardy and Jeff Hardy), security guards, as well as Santino Marella, tried to intervene, but were once again held off; Stone, who this past summer tried to replace Marella, even knocked him out as the show went off air.

On the subsequent episode of TNA Impact!, Santana opened with an in-ring promo, saying he attended a safe space meeting before he arrived at Turning Point, later vowing to hunt each member of the NXT group one-by-one. Later that night, Marella and his daughter, NXT-TNA liaison Arianna Grace, discussed how the invading NXT group broke into Turning Point, as apparently, the main entrance was left unguarded after Santana entered the arena. Marella suggested allowing them into TNA's shows but needed a reason for them to come. Maclin and The Hardys would suggest that they offer title matches to the NXT wrestlers, to which Marella agreed. A vignette from the NXT group would soon air, as each member made their own threats to TNA. Notable moments include Dempsey taunting Santana – their attack on Santana's arm resulting in a torn UCL and hyperextended elbow – and Stone claiming he was not behind their invasion, either. Marella then announced that, in conjunction with NXT General Manager Ava, several NXT vs. TNA matches would be signed for Turning Point: Santana to face Dempsey, The Hardys to defend the TNA World Tag Team Championship against The High Ryze, and Maclin putting the TNA International Championship up against Stacks.

On the November 13 episode of TNA Impact!, The System (Moose, Brian Myers, JDC, Eddie Edwards, and Alisha Edwards) had a live promo. JDC, who had recently gotten married, revealed that he and his wife had been speaking about his wrestling career before he announced that, after Genesis the following January, he would retire from in-ring competition. The next week, TNA World Champion Frankie Kazarian met with Santino Marella backstage, demanding an apology for ever thinking he was involved in the invasion by the NXT wrestlers last week. Marella brushed him off as he had a meeting with JDC later. JDC would then walk in as Kazarian insulted his wife. Offended, JDC tried to goad Kazarian into giving him a title match. Though Kazarian refused, Marella would declare that if JDC defeated Eric Young in the main event that night, he would have his opportunity at the world title at Final Resolution. He would win the match, thus making the world title match between him and Kazarian official.

At Turning Point, Leon Slater successfully defended the TNA X Division Championship against Rich Swann. After the match, Slater and Swann shared a moment of respect when the latter shook Slater's hand. This didn't sit well with Swann's Fir$t Cla$$ teammate A. J. Francis, who, on the subsequent episode of TNA Impact!, berated Swann for failing to win the title. Slater would try to smooth things out, but Francis rebuked him while eyeing his title. TNA would later announce that Slater would defend the X Division Championship against Francis at Turning Point.

On the November 20 episode of TNA Impact!, Mance Warner defeated Matt Cardona due to interference by his wife Steph De Lander. Backstage after the match, a frustrated Cardona put out a challenge to Warner and De Lander for a street fight, which TNA announced for Final Resolution.

Two four-way matches were held on the November 20 TNA Impact!, where the winners of both matches would face each other in a singles match in two weeks; the winner of that match would become the number one contender to the TNA Knockouts World Championship at Final Resolution. In the first four-way match, Dani Luna defeated Indi Hartwell, Rosemary, and Myla Grace to advance to the number one contender's match. Later that night, Xia Brookside defeated Jody Threat, Killer Kelly, and Victoria Crawford to also advance. On the second week of NXT: Gold Rush, Léi Yǐng Lee, Brookside's tag team partner, won the TNA Knockouts World Champion after defeating NXT wrestlers Jordynne Grace and reigning champion Kelani Jordan in a triple threat match against fellow NXT wrestler. Over a week later on the December 4 TNA Impact!, Brookside defeated Luna to become the number one contender, and would officially face Lee for the title at Final Resolution.

At Turning Point, The IInspiration (Cassie Lee and Jessie McKay) were set to defend the TNA Knockouts World Tag Team Championship in a three-way tag team match against The Angel Warriors (Xia Brookside and Léi Yǐng Lee), and the team of Tessa Blanchard and Victoria Crawford. However, right before the match, Blanchard announced that she was not medically cleared to compete. Mila Moore would take her place in the match, but The IInspiration retained the titles after pinning Brookside. Two weeks later, on the November 27 episode of TNA Impact!, TNA announced that The IInspiration would defend the tag team titles against Crawford and Blanchard, who was now medically cleared, at Final Resolution.

== Results ==
No.	Results	Stipulations	Times
1^{P}	Cedric Alexander defeated Eric Young by pinfall	Singles match	7:36
2^{P}	The System (Brian Myers, Eddie Edwards and Moose) (with Alisha Edwards) defeated Bear Bronson and The Andersons (Brock Anderson and C. W. Anderson) by pinfall	Six-man tag team match	6:23
3	Mike Santana defeated Charlie Dempsey by pinfall	Singles match	8:59
4	The IInspiration (Cassie Lee and Jessie McKay) (c) defeated Tessa Blanchard and Victoria Crawford (with Robert Stone) by pinfall	Tag team match for the TNA Knockouts World Tag Team Championship	8:43
5	Matt Cardona defeated Mance Warner (with Steph De Lander) by pinfall	Street Fight	11:30
6	Channing "Stacks" Lorenzo (with Lexis King) defeated Steve Maclin (c) by pinfall	Singles match for the TNA International Championship	11:38
7	Léi Yǐng Lee (c) defeated Xia Brookside by pinfall	Singles match for the TNA Knockouts World Championship	12:38
8	The Rascalz (Trey Miguel, Zachary Wentz, Myron Reed, and Dezmond Xavier) defeated Order 4 (Mustafa Ali, John Skyler, Jason Hotch and Special Agent 0) (with Tasha Steelz) by pinfall	Eight-man tag team match	14:28
9	The Hardys (Matt Hardy and Jeff Hardy) (c) defeated The High Ryze (Tyson Dupont and Tyriek Igwe) (with Robert Stone) by pinfall	Tag team match for the TNA World Tag Team Championship	8:44
10	Leon Slater (c) defeated A. J. Francis (with Rich Swann) by pinfall	Singles match for the TNA X Division Championship	14:53
11	Frankie Kazarian (c) defeated JDC by technical knockout	Singles match for the TNA World Championship	13:28
(c) / – the champion(s) heading into the match; P / – the match was broadcast on the pre-show
