= Final Resolution (2006) =

2006 Total Nonstop Action Wrestling pay-per-view event

- Promotional poster featuring Christopher Daniels (left) and Samoa Joe (right)
- Promotion: Total Nonstop Action Wrestling (TNA)
- Date: January 15, 2006
- City: Orlando, Florida
- Venue: TNA Impact! Zone
- Attendance: 900

Pay-per-view chronology
← Previous; Turning Point	Next → Against All Odds

Final Resolution chronology
← Previous; 2005	Next → 2007

The 2006 Final Resolution was a professional wrestling pay-per-view (PPV) event produced by the Total Nonstop Action Wrestling (TNA) promotion that took place on January 15, 2006 at the TNA Impact! Zone in Orlando, Florida. It was the second event under the Final Resolution name and first event of the 2006 TNA PPV schedule. Nine professional wrestling matches and two pre-show matches were featured on the event's card, two of which were for championships.

The main event was a tag team match pitting the team of Christian Cage and Sting against the team of Jeff Jarrett and Monty Brown. The team of Cage and Sting won the encounter. The TNA X Division Championship was defended by Samoa Joe against Christopher Daniels at the event, which Joe won to retain the title. America's Most Wanted (Chris Harris and James Storm) defeated Team 3D (Brother Devon and Brother Ray) to retain the NWA World Tag Team Championship at the show. On the undercard, Sean Waltman fought Raven in a No Disqualification match with the stipulation that if Raven lost, he would be fired from TNA. Waltman won the encounter, causing Raven to be fired from TNA in the storyline.

Final Resolution is remembered for the TNA debut of Sting, which was ranked as the 2nd greatest moment in the company's history due to it marking Sting's return to national television after five years. Bob Kapur of the professional wrestling section of the Canadian Online Explorer rated the show a 6.5 out of 10, lower than the ratings given to the 2005 and 2007 installments.

In October 2017, with the launch of the Global Wrestling Network, the event became available to stream on demand.

== Production ==
=== Background ===
Total Nonstop Action Wrestling (TNA) announced in early October 2005 that their January PPV would once again be called Final Resolution, until they pulled this release from their website. TNA later reinstated this piece of information with the official date of the show being January 15, 2006 at the TNA Impact Zone in Orlando, Florida. TNA created a section of their website to promote the event. A promotional poster for the show was released prior by TNA featuring Christopher Daniels and Samoa Joe. A thirty-minute pre-show was scheduled to take place prior to the telecast featuring two wrestling matches.

=== Storylines ===
Final Resolution featured nine professional wrestling matches and two pre-show matches that involved different wrestlers from pre-existing scripted feuds and storylines. Wrestlers portrayed villains, heroes, or less distinguishable characters in the scripted events that built tension and culminated in a wrestling match or series of matches.

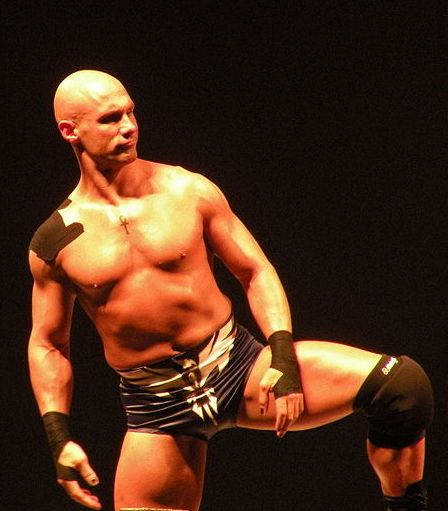
Christopher Daniels (pictured) returned from injury to challenge Samoa Joe for the TNA X Division Championship at Final Resolution.

The main event at Final Resolution was a Tag Team match pitting the team of Christian Cage and Sting against the team of Jeff Jarrett and Monty Brown. The background to this match began at TNA's Genesis PPV event on November 13, 2005 where Cage made his debut proclaiming he wanted to win the NWA World Heavyweight Championship held by Jarrett. TNA advertised a major announcement to take place at their previous PPV event Turning Point on December 11, 2005. The announcement was the acquisition of Sting as a newly signed wrestler to the TNA roster. Cage then went on to defeat Brown at Turning Point to become number-one contender to the title. This match was announced on the December 31, 2005 episode of TNA's television program TNA Impact!.

The TNA X Division Championship was defended at Final Resolution by then-champion Samoa Joe against the challenger Christopher Daniels. This rivalry started at TNA's Sacrifice PPV event on August 14 when Joe won the 2005 TNA Super X Cup Tournament to become number-one contender to the TNA X Division Championship held by Daniels. Joe went on to compete against A.J. Styles and Daniels in a Three Way match at TNA's Unbreakable PPV event on September 11, which Styles won to become the new champion. At Genesis, Joe and Daniels competed in a Four-on-Four Tag Team Elimination X match, which Joe and Daniels' team won. After the bout, Joe attacked and injured Daniels, thus sidelining him in the storyline. Joe then went on to defeat Styles at Turning Point to become the new TNA X Division Champion. After their match, Joe attacked Styles and attempted to injure Styles in a manner similar to the way he injured Daniels. At this time Daniels returned from injury to save Styles from the attack. TNA promoted this match for Final Resolution on the January 7, 2006 episode of Impact!.

The NWA World Tag Team Championship was defended by then-champions America's Most Wanted (Chris Harris and James Storm; AMW) against Team 3D (Brother Devon and Brother Ray) at the event. The storyline behind this match began on the October 8, 2005 episode of Impact! where AMW and Jeff Jarrett assaulted Team 3D to the point they were left covered in blood. Afterwards, Team 3D were not seen due to a scripted injury, with Jarrett, AMW, and Team Canada (A-1, Bobby Roode, Eric Young, Petey Williams, and Coach Scott D'Amore) hosting a segment where they buried Team 3D's careers on the October 15, 2005 episode of Impact!. Team 3D made their return from injury at TNA's Bound for Glory PPV event on October 23, 2005 attacking Jarrett and AMW. At Genesis, Team 3D teamed with Rhino to defeat AMW and Jarrett in a Six Man Tag Team match. At Turning Point, Team 3D defeated AMW in a Tag Team Elimination Tables match. TNA advertised Team 3D versus AMW for the tag team championship to take place at the event.

Raven and NWA Championship Committee member Larry Zbyszko were involved in a rivalry heading into Final Resolution. At Bound for Glory, Raven requested an NWA World Heavyweight Championship match but was denied by Zbyszko. This led to Raven assaulting him before being ejected from the arena by security in the storyline. At Genesis, Zybysko offered Raven the chance to be released from his contract, as this was what Zbyszko wanted in the storyline. Raven declined the offer and tried to attack Zbyszko once again. Instead, Zbyszko forced Raven to face P.J. Polaco in a match, which Raven won. This led to Turning Point where Raven once again declined an offer to be released. Zbyszko then revealed Chris K as Raven's opponent for the night; Raven was victorious in the encounter. On the December 17, 2005 episode of Impact!, Zbyszko announced that at Final Resolution Raven would have another opponent and if he won the bout then he gained a future NWA World Heavyweight Championship match.

== Event ==
Other on-screen personnel
Role:	Name:
Commentator	Mike Tenay
Commentator	Don West
Ring announcer	Jeremy Borash
Referee	Rudy Charles
Referee	Mark "Slick" Johnson
Referee	Andrew Thomas
Interviewers	Jeremy Borash
Interviewers	Shane Douglas

=== Pre-Show ===
Prior to the airing of Final Resolution, TNA held a thirty-minute pre-show. During the broadcast, Team Canada (A-1, Eric Young, and Petey Williams) faced the team of Jay Lethal, Kenny King, and Lance Hoyt in a Six Man Tag Team match that lasted 5 minutes and 54 seconds. Williams pinned Lethal after forcing Lethal head-first into the mat with his signature Canadian Destroyer maneuver. Another contest was held, with The Latin American Exchange (Homicide and Konnan) defeating The Naturals (Andy Douglas and Chase Stevens) in 3 minutes and 50 seconds. Homicide pinned Stevens after Konnan hit Stevens with a slapjack.

=== Miscellaneous ===
Final Resolution featured employees other than the wrestlers involved in the matches. Mike Tenay and Don West were the commentators for the telecast. Jeremy Borash was the ring announcer for the event. Andrew Thomas, Rudy Charles, and Mark "Slick" Johnson participated as referees for the encounters. Shane Douglas handled the interview duties during the show. Besides employees who appeared in a wrestling role, Coach D'Amore, Gail Kim, Simon Diamond, Traci, Shannon Moore, Larry Zybysko, and James Mitchell all appeared on camera, either in backstage or in ringside segments.

=== Preliminary matches ===
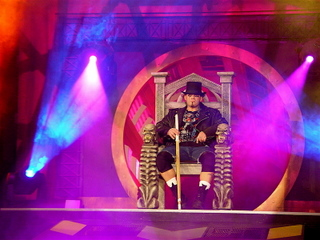
Raven (pictured) was fired at Final Resolution.

The opening bout was a X Division Six Man Tag Team match pitting the team of Alex Shelley, Austin Aries, and Roderick Strong against the team of Chris Sabin, Matt Bentley, and Sonjay Dutt. Traci accompanied Bentley to the ring. Shelley won the match for his team by using a small package pin on Bentley at 10 minutes and 32 seconds.

The James Gang (Kip James and B.G. James) fought The Diamonds in the Rough (David Young and Elix Skipper) next. Simon Diamond accompanied The Diamonds in the Rough to the ring. The duration of this contest was 7 minutes and 47 seconds. Kip pinned Skipper after a Missouri Boat Ride.

The third encounter was between A.J. Styles and Hiroshi Tanahashi, which lasted 11 minutes and 3 seconds. During the bout, Shannon Moore interfered trying to hit Styles with Styles' Mr. TNA plaque. Styles dodged the assault, causing Tanahashi to take the blow. Styles followed up by slamming Tanahashi face-first into the mat with his signature Styles Clash maneuver and pinned him to win the bout.

Following the third match, Larry Zbyszko revealed that Raven's opponent for the night was Sean Waltman. The two then fought in a No Disqualification match with the stipulation that if Raven won he gained a future NWA World Heavyweight Championship match, but if he lost he would be fired from TNA. During the bout, the referee was knocked out with Zbyszko taking over his duties. Waltman won the contest after forcing Raven face-first off of a ladder through a table with his signature X-Factor maneuver. Zbyszko counted the pin despite Raven's foot on the bottom rope at 10 minutes. As a result of his loss, Raven was fired from TNA in the storyline.

The following contest pitted Bobby Roode, who was accompanied by Coach D'Amore, against Ron Killings. The duration of the match was 9 minutes and 53 seconds. Konnan interfered in the bout distracting Killings, which allowed Roode to sneak up behind Killings and hit him in the back of the head with Roode's signature Northern Lariat maneuver.

The sixth encounter was between Abyss and Rhino, which lasted 9 minutes and 18 seconds. James Mitchell accompanied Abyss to the ring. Mitchell interfered in the contest by distracting the referee, allowing Abyss to bash Rhino with a steel chain. Abyss was the victor in the bout after slamming Rhino back-first onto a steel chair with his signature Black Hole Slam maneuver.

=== Main event matches ===
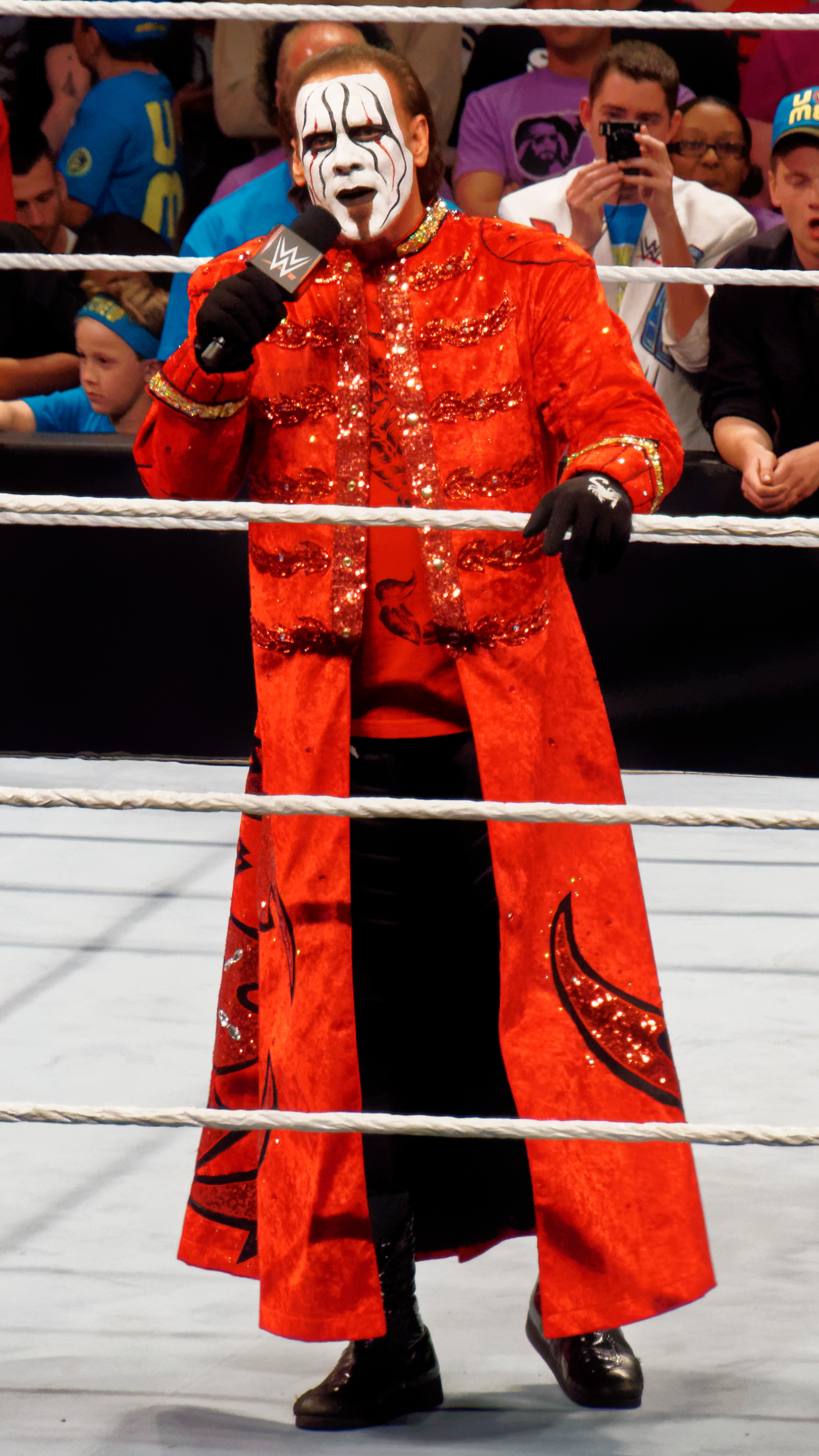
Sting (pictured in 2015) made his TNA debut at Final Resolution.

The NWA World Tag Team Championship was defended by America's Most Wanted (Chris Harris and James Storm; AMW) against Team 3D (Brother Devon and Brother Ray) next. Gail Kim accompanied AMW to the ring. Midway through the bout, Team 3D performed their signature Whassup? maneuver on Storm. Kim interfered in the bout, distracting the referee. Around this time, Devon retrieved a table from under the ring which both teams used as a weapon, however the referee did not disqualify anyone for the usage. AMW earned a near-fall after a bearhug and a lariat combination on Ray. Team 3D followed with their own near-fall on Harris, after they performed their signature Deadly Device maneuver on Storm. After this, Kim interfered trying to blow powder into Ray's eyes, only for Ray to stop her and blow it back into her and the referee's eyes. With the referee blinded, Team 3D performed their signature 3D maneuver on Harris and the referee counted the pin. Team Canada then attacked 3D, knocking out Ray in the process with a hockey stick. They placed Harris on top of Ray and left the ring. After the referee regained his vision, he declared AMW the victors at 12 minutes and 41 seconds.

Samoa Joe defended the TNA X Division Championship against Christopher Daniels in the eighth match of the show. Midway through the contest, Joe avoided a moonsault by Daniels by casually walking away, a trademark action of his persona. Daniels earned a near-fall after forcing Joe against the mat with a modified Death Valley Driver from the top of a padded turnbuckle. Joe followed up with his own near-fall by slamming Daniels back-first against the mat from the turnbuckle with a powerbomb. Daniels then performed his signature Best Moonsault Ever maneuver, gaining another near-fall. Their fight spilled to the ringside area where Joe positioned Daniels' head against the guardrail and kicked it against the rail. This move resulted in Daniels bleeding from the forehead, which Joe targeted for the rest of the bout. At this time, A.J. Styles came down to the ringside area. Joe performed his signature Muscle Buster maneuver and followed up by attempting to place Daniels in his trademarked Coquina Clutch submission maneuver, which Daniels fought off. Joe then dropped Daniels from the top of a turnbuckle onto a chair and continued to target Daniels' bleeding forehead. With Daniels unconscious in the storyline, A.J. Styles threw in the towel for Daniels to stop the match at 15 minutes and 30 seconds, resulting in Joe being declared the victor by TKO.

The main event was a tag team match pitting the team of Christian Cage and Sting against the team of Jeff Jarrett and Monty Brown. The duration of the encounter was 15 minutes and 35 seconds. Jarrett was accompanied by Gail Kim. Cage and Brown started the match before they both quickly tagged in their partners. Kim interfered by distracting the referee, allowing Jarrett to hit Cage in the groin and throw him to the ringside mat. Kim then assaulted Cage in the ringside area. After several minutes of Jarrett and Brown having the advantage over a beaten Cage, Sting was tagged into the match and placed Jarrett in his signature Scorpion Deathlock submission maneuver. Jarrett submitted to the maneuver, but the referee was unconscious. Team Canada then interfered in the bout, attacking Cage and Sting. Jarrett bashed Sting in the face with the NWA World Heavyweight Championship belt and covered for a near-fall once the referee regained consciousness. Afterwards, Sting forced Jarrett's head into the ring mat with his trademark Scorpion Death Drop maneuver and covered for the pinfall victory.

== Reception ==
A total of 900 people attended Final Resolution. Canadian Online Explorer writer Bob Kapur rated the entire event a 6.5 out of 10, which was lower than the rating given to the 2005 installment. It was also lower than the 7.5 out of 10 the 2007 event was given by Chris Sokol. The Final Resolution ranking was lower than Turning Point's rating, which received a 7 out of 10 from Kapur. TNA's next PPV event, Against All Odds, on February 12, 2006 was also ranked higher than Final Resolution; it received a rating of 7 out of 10 from Jason Clevett. Compared to rival World Wrestling Entertainment's (WWE) Royal Rumble PPV event which took place the same month, Final Resolution was ranked lower as Royal Rumble was given a 7 out of 10 by Dale Plummer and Nick Tylwalk.

The highest rating given by Kapur to an individual match went to the TNA X Division Championship bout, with an 8.5 out of 10. The opening Six Man Tag Team match, the No Disqualification match, Bobby Roode versus Ron Killings, the NWA World Tag Team Championship match, and the main event all received a 7 out of 10 by Kapur in his review. Regarding the main event, Kapur said that "Sting looked good, but it remains to be seen if his return will be a turning point for the company in the long run." Kapur commented on the X Division Championship match stating it was a "good match" that "reinforced Joe's dominance, and left the door open for another match with either Daniels or Styles." He thought the World Tag Team Championship bout had a "stupid ending" that "marred what was otherwise a good tag match."

James Caldwell of the Pro Wrestling Torch Newsletter reviewed the show and stated that the debut of Sting "answered a few questions" but that Sting "wasn't involved in the match long enough to see how he'll hold up over twelve months. However, he surpassed initial expectations with a strong effort and good energy. It was an encouraging return to TNA." He also commented on the match that the "effectiveness of the finish was hurt by the usual interference and shortcuts." Caldwell discussed the X Division Championship bout by praising it as the "best story told in the ring tonight" but that it was "too short of a match for the featured X Division." As for the No Disqualification match, Caldwell said that it "set up the next chapter of the story" and that the "hardcore aspect had a place on the card."

TNA released a DVD counting down the top 50 moments in their history in 2007, with Sting's debut at Final Resolution ranking at number 2 on the compilation.

== Aftermath ==
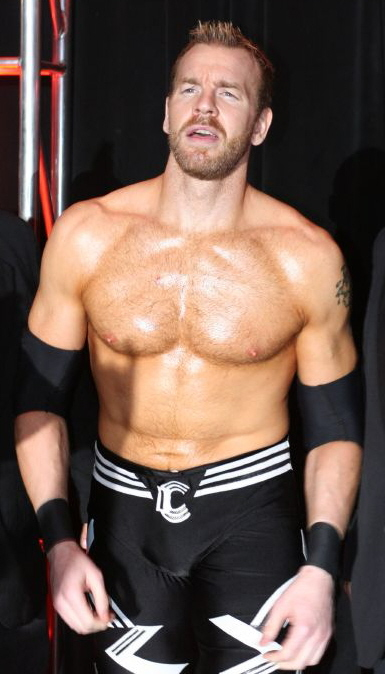
Christian Cage (pictured) went on to win the NWA World Heavyweight Championship at Against All Odds from Jeff Jarrett.

Christian Cage and Jeff Jarrett continued their feud after Final Resolution. Since Cage had defeated Monty Brown at Turning Point to become number one contender he was in line for an NWA World Heavyweight Championship match. On the January 21 episode of Impact!, Larry Zybysko revealed an open contract for a future title match at Against All Odds. On the January 28 episode of Impact!, it was announced that Cage would face Jarrett for the NWA World Heavyweight Championship at Against All Odds. Cage defeated Jarrett to win the title at the event. He held the championship until TNA's Slammiversary PPV event on June 18 when Jarrett won a King of the Mountain match for the title that also involved Cage, Sting, Abyss, and Ron Killings.

Sting signed a one-year contract and appeared on the January 28 episode of Impact! where he announced his scripted retirement. Sting did not appear in TNA until their Destination X PPV event on March 12 when he appeared after the main event to save Cage from an assault by America's Most Wanted, Abyss, Alex Shelley, Team Canada, Jarrett, and Brown before being attacked himself by the debuting Scott Steiner. Sting then teamed with Styles, Killings and Rhino as part of a team referred to as Sting's Warriors against Jarrett's Army, composed of Jarrett, Steiner, and America's Most Wanted in a Four-on-Four Lethal Lockdown match at TNA's Lockdown PPV event on April 23. Sting's Warriors won the contest at the event.

Samoa Joe went on to defend the TNA X Division Championship in a Three Way match against A.J. Syles and Christopher Daniels at Against All Odds in a rematch of their bout at Unbreakable in October 2005. On the January 21 episode of Impact!, it was announced that Styles would face Joe for the title at Against All Odds. In the same telecast, Daniels accused Styles of trying to take his spot as the contender for the championship due to Styles having thrown in the towel for Daniels. Styles argued that he was instead looking out for Daniels' health in the storyline. The following week on the January 28 episode of Impact!, Zybysko announced that the three would compete in a Three Way match for the title at the show. Joe retained the title at the spectacle.

Following Final Resolution, Team 3D faced Team Canada at Against All Odds in order to exact revenge for their actions at the event. Team 3D demanded a match against America's Most Wanted and Team Canada from Zybysko on the January 21 episode of Impact! with Zybysko granting the request but only against one of the teams, leaving it up to Team 3D to decide. Brother Ray announced on the January 28 episode of Impact! that they were leaving the decision up to the TNA fans to decide who they faced at Against All Odds. On the February 4 episode of Impact!, Team 3D announced that the fans voted for them to face Team Canada. Team 3D defeated Team Canada at the show.

As for other rivalries after Final Resolution, Rhino and Abyss fought in a rematch on the January 28 episode of Impact! that ended in a no contest. TNA commentator Mike Tenay announced on the February 4 episode of Impact! that Rhino and Abyss would face in a Falls Count Anywhere match at Against All Odds. Rhino went on to win the contest. America's Most Wanted went on to successfully defend the NWA World Tag Team Championship at Against All Odds against the team of Chris Sabin and Sonjay Dutt. Raven did not appear in TNA for several months after the event due to his scripted firing. Sean Waltman was also not used by TNA following Final Resolution since TNA wanted to be "cautious about using him long-term giving his track record."

== Results ==
No.	Results	Stipulations	Times
1^{P}	Team Canada (A-1, Eric Young, and Petey Williams) defeated Jay Lethal, Kenny King, and Lance Hoyt	Six-man tag team match	5:54
2^{P}	The Latin American Exchange (Homicide and Konnan) defeated The Naturals (Andy Douglas and Chase Stevens)	Tag team match	3:50
3	Alex Shelley, Austin Aries, and Roderick Strong defeated Chris Sabin, Matt Bentley and Sonjay Dutt (with Traci)	X Division Six-man tag team match	10:32
4	The James Gang (B.G. James and Kip James) defeated The Diamonds in the Rough (David Young and Elix Skipper) (with Simon Diamond)	Tag team match	7:47
5	A.J. Styles defeated Hiroshi Tanahashi	Singles match	11:03
6	Sean Waltman defeated Raven	No Disqualification match since Waltman won Raven was fired from TNA (kayfabe), if Raven had won he would have won a future match for the NWA World Heavyweight Championship	10:00
7	Bobby Roode (with Coach D'Amore) defeated Ron Killings	Singles match	9:53
8	Abyss (with James Mitchell) defeated Rhino	Singles match	9:18
9	America's Most Wanted (Chris Harris and James Storm) (with Gail Kim) (c) defeated Team 3D (Brother Devon and Brother Ray)	Tag team match for the NWA World Tag Team Championship	12:41
10	Samoa Joe (c) defeated Christopher Daniels by technical knockout	Singles match for the TNA X Division Championship	15:30
11	Christian Cage and Sting defeated Jeff Jarrett and Monty Brown (with Gail Kim)	Tag team match	15:35
(c) / – the champion(s) heading into the match; P / – the match was broadcast on the pre-show
