= Final Resolution (2009) =

2009 Total Nonstop Action Wrestling pay-per-view event

- Promotional poster featuring (left to right) Alex Shelley and Chris Sabin
- Promotion: Total Nonstop Action Wrestling
- Date: December 20, 2009
- City: Orlando, Florida
- Venue: TNA Impact! Zone
- Attendance: 1,200
- Tagline: Someone Will Be Fired!

Pay-per-view chronology
← Previous; Turning Point	Next → Genesis

Final Resolution chronology
← Previous; December 2008	Next → 2010

The 2009 Final Resolution was a professional wrestling pay-per-view (PPV) event produced by the Total Nonstop Action Wrestling (TNA) promotion, which took place on December 20, 2009 at the TNA Impact! Zone in Orlando, Florida. It was the sixth event under the Final Resolution chronology and the last TNA pay-per-view to use a six-sided ring until Destination X 2011.

== Storylines ==
Other on-screen personnel
Role:	Name:
Commentator	Mike Tenay
Commentator	Taz
Interviewer	Jeremy Borash
Interviewer	Lauren Thompson
Ring announcer	Jeremy Borash
Ring announcer	David Penzer
Referee	Earl Hebner
Referee	Rudy Charles
Referee	Mark Johnson
Referee	Andrew Thomas
Referee	Jamie Tucker

Final Resolution feature eight professional wrestling matches that involved different wrestlers from pre-existing scripted feuds and storylines. Wrestlers were portrayed as villains, heroes, or less distinguishable characters in the scripted events that built tension and culminated into a wrestling match or series of matches.

== Results ==
No.	Results	Stipulations	Times
1	The British Invasion (Brutus Magnus and Doug Williams) (c) defeated The Motor City Machine Guns (Alex Shelley and Chris Sabin)	Tag team match for the TNA World Tag Team Championship	11:47
2	Tara defeated ODB (c)	Singles match for the TNA Women's Knockout Championship	05:39
3	Kevin Nash (World Tag Team), Rob Terry (X Division), Samoa Joe (World Heavyweight) and Sheik Abdul Bashir (Pink Slip) defeated Cody Deaner, Consequences Creed, James Storm, Jay Lethal, Robert Roode and World Elite (Eric Young, Kiyoshi, and Homicide)	Feast or Fired match	11:00
4	D'Angelo Dinero, Hernandez, Matt Morgan and Suicide defeated Jesse Neal, Team 3D (Brother Devon and Brother Ray) and Rhino	Eight-man tag team elimination match	16:30
5	Bobby Lashley defeated Scott Steiner	Last Man Standing match	09:13
6	Abyss and Mick Foley defeated Dr. Stevie and Raven	Foley's Funhouse Rules match	09:31
7	Kurt Angle defeated Desmond Wolfe (2–1)	Three Degrees of Pain	26:14
8	A.J. Styles (c) defeated Daniels	Singles match for the TNA World Heavyweight Championship	21:02
(c) / – the champion(s) heading into the match
