= Final Resolution (2012) =

2012 Total Nonstop Action Wrestling pay-per-view event

- Promotional poster featuring Jeff Hardy
- Promotion: Total Nonstop Action Wrestling
- Date: December 9, 2012
- City: Orlando, Florida
- Venue: Impact Zone
- Attendance: 1,100
- Tagline(s): Redemption

Pay-per-view chronology
← Previous; Turning Point	Next → Genesis

Final Resolution chronology
← Previous; 2011	Next → 2013

The 2012 Final Resolution was a professional wrestling pay-per-view event produced by Total Nonstop Action Wrestling that was held on December 9, 2012 at the Impact Wrestling Zone in Orlando, Florida. It was the ninth annual Final Resolution event and the final one to be on pay-per-view.

Eight matches were contested at the event. In the main event, Jeff Hardy defeated Robert Roode to retain the TNA World Heavyweight Championship. In other prominent matches, Christopher Daniels defeated AJ Styles and Austin Aries defeated Bully Ray.

In October 2017, with the launch of the Global Wrestling Network, the event became available to stream on demand.

== Storylines ==
Other on-screen personnel
Commentator	Mike Tenay
Commentator	Taz
Ring announcer	Jeremy Borash
Referee	Rudy Charles
Referee	Mark "Slick" Johnson
Referee	Andrew Thomas
Interviewers	Jeremy Borash

Final Resolution featured eight professional wrestling matches that involved different wrestlers from pre-existing scripted feuds and storylines. Wrestlers portrayed villains, heroes, or less distinguishable characters in the scripted events that built tension and culminated in a wrestling match or series of matches.

The main angle entering Final Resolution involved Bobby Roode going after defending champion Jeff Hardy for the TNA World Heavyweight Championship. At Turning Point, James Storm defeated A.J. Styles and Bobby Roode in a 3-Way match to earn his shot at the TNA World Heavyweight Championship. On the following Impact Wrestling episode during Storm's speech about succeeding through adversity, Roode interrupted and upset his rival, Storm, as part of a manipulative way for Storm to place his title shot on the line in a match between them later that night. As a result, Roode prevailed over Storm using an exposed turnbuckle and a roll-up to snatch the victory and essentially assume Storm's title shot.

Another continuous feud being featured at the event is between A.J. Styles and Christopher Daniels. At Turning Point, Styles suffered a huge loss in a stipulated 3-Way contender's match, where the wrestler pinned would be excommunicated from the TNA World Heavyweight Championship scene until Bound for Glory 2013. On the November 15 edition of Impact Wrestling, with emotions running high, Styles expressed feelings over an upsetting year having to deal with allegations thrown at him as well as coming close to winning the 2012 Bound for Glory Series. Daniels and Kazarian, who had set up and blown such allegations out of proportion to defame and distract Styles, took the chance to mock and insult him calling Styles a "failure". Styles, knowing how many times he fought and beat Daniels, eventually challenged Daniels to one last match to decide who the better man is. Daniels, proud of his momentum with Kazarian throughout the year, later agreed to the match.

The Knockouts match heading into Final Resolution is Mickie James versus TNA Women's Knockout Champion Tara. On the November 15 edition of Impact Wrestling, Mickie James made her return to the company and defeated Gail Kim, ODB, Madison Rayne, and Miss Tessmacher in a No. 1 contender's Battle Royal to gain a shot at the TNA Knockout Championship.

== Results ==
No.	Results	Stipulations	Times
1	James Storm defeated Kazarian	Singles match	06:09
2	Rob Van Dam (c) defeated Kenny King	Singles match for the TNA X Division Championship	09:22
3	Chavo Guerrero and Hernandez (c) defeated Joey Ryan and Matt Morgan by disqualification	Tag team match for the TNA World Tag Team Championship	10:36
4	Austin Aries defeated Bully Ray	Singles match	13:08
5	Tara (c) defeated Mickie James	Singles match for the TNA Women's Knockout Championship	07:53
6	Garett Bischoff, Kurt Angle, Samoa Joe and Wes Brisco defeated Aces & Eights (Devon, D.O.C., Knux and C. J. O'Doyle)	Eight-man tag team match	11:22
7	Christopher Daniels defeated A.J. Styles	Singles match	21:37
8	Jeff Hardy (c) defeated Bobby Roode	Singles match for the TNA World Heavyweight Championship	23:00
(c) / – the champion(s) heading into the match

== See also ==
- 2012 in professional wrestling
