= Final Resolution (2007) =

2007 Total Nonstop Action Wrestling pay-per-view event

- DVD cover featuring Christian Cage, Abyss and Sting
- Promotion: Total Nonstop Action Wrestling
- Date: January 14, 2007
- City: Orlando, Florida
- Venue: TNA Impact! Zone
- Tagline: "Joe is going to kill you"

Pay-per-view chronology
← Previous; Turning Point	Next → Against All Odds

Final Resolution chronology
← Previous; 2006	Next → January 2008

The 2007 Final Resolution was a professional wrestling pay-per-view (PPV) event produced by Total Nonstop Action Wrestling (TNA), which took place on January 14, 2007, at the TNA Impact! Zone in Orlando, Florida. It was the third event under the Final Resolution chronology.

Nine matches were contested at the event, with two being taped as dark matches. In the main event, Christian Cage defeated Sting and Abyss to retain the TNA World Heavyweight Championship. In other prominent matches, Kurt Angle defeated Samoa Joe 3–2 in an Iron man match, Chris Sabin defeated Christopher Daniels and Jerry Lynn to win the Impact X Division Championship and in the opening contest, Rhino defeated AJ Styles in a Last Man Standing match.

The pay-per-view had a buy rate of 35,000. In October 2017, with the launch of the Global Wrestling Network, the event became available to stream on demand.

== Storylines ==
The event featured wrestlers from pre-existing scripted feuds and storylines. Wrestlers portrayed villains, heroes, or less distinguishable characters in the scripted events that built tension and culminated in a wrestling match or series of matches.

== Event ==
Prior to the start of the event there was a dark match which saw Jason Riggs and Johnny Riggs defeat Serotonin (Kazarian and Havok) when Riggs pinned Havok.

Following this match there was one match during the pre-show. During this match Lance Hoyt defeated Chase Stevens. Hoyt pinned Stevens after a Fireman's carry flapjack. A. J. Pierzynski and Dale Torborg were in the audience and heckled Hoyt resulting in a confrontation after the match.

During the first match of the pay-per-view, Rhino defeated A.J. Styles in a Last Man Standing match (14:44) when Styles failed to answer the ten-count after Rhino hit two Gore's. Next Chris Sabin defeated Christopher Daniels and Jerry Lynn in a 3-Way Dance to win the TNA X Division Championship, when Sabin pinned Lynn with a roll-up while grabbing the tights.

In the Paparazzi Championship Series finals, Alex Shelley defeated Austin Starr. The judges were "Samolian Joe", "Big Fat Oily Guy" and Bob Backlund. The match originally went to a ten-minute time limit draw and was then declared a draw by the judges, before Kevin Nash ordered extra time. Shelley pinned Starr with a roll-up, and Shelley was presented a bowling trophy.

Next James Storm defeated Petey Williams, when Storm pinned Williams while grabbing the ropes during a roll-up. Jacqueline made her return to TNA and delivered a Death Sentence with Storm to Gail Kim.

In the NWA World Tag Team Championship match, The Latin American Exchange (Homicide and Hernandez) defeated Team 3D (Brother Ray and Brother Devon) by disqualification to retain the titles. Team 3D were disqualified after a drunk Brother Runt interfered, jumping off the top rope onto Homicide.

The penultimate match was a 30 minutes Iron Man match between Kurt Angle and Samoa Joe. The winner of the match a shot at the NWA World Heavyweight Championship at Against All Odds. Joe forced Angle to submit to the Coquina Clutch to pick up the first fall. Angle then forced Joe to submit to the Ankle Lock to even the score at 1:1. Angle again forced Joe to submit to the Ankle Lock to take a 2:1 lead. Joe next pinned Angle after a Muscle Buster to even the score at 2:2. Angle picked up the final decision with approximately 5 minutes left in the match, when he pinned Joe with a cradle pin.

In the main event Abyss defended the NWA World Heavyweight Championship against Christian Cage and Sting in a Three Way Elimination match. Sting first pinned Abyss after the Scorpion Death Drop guaranteeing a new champion would be crowned. Cage next pinned Sting after a Frog Splash to win the championship.

== Results ==
No.	Results	Stipulations	Times
1^{D}	Jason Riggs and Johnny Riggs defeated Serotonin (Kazarian and Havok)	Tag team match	—
2^{P}	Lance Hoyt defeated Chase Stevens	Singles match	2:04
3	Rhino defeated A.J. Styles	Last Man Standing match	15:06
4	Chris Sabin defeated Christopher Daniels (c) and Jerry Lynn	Three-way match for the TNA X Division Championship	11:50
5	Alex Shelley defeated Austin Starr	Paparazzi Championship Series finals	14:59
6	James Storm (with Gail Kim) defeated Petey Williams	Singles match	6:50
7	The Latin American Exchange (Homicide and Hernandez) (c) defeated Team 3D (Brother Ray and Brother Devon) by disqualification	Tag team match for the NWA World Tag Team Championship	10:21
8	Kurt Angle defeated Samoa Joe 3-2	30-minute Iron Man match to determine the #1 contender to the NWA World Heavyweight Championship at Against All Odds	30:00
9	Christian Cage defeated Abyss (c) (with James Mitchell) and Sting	Three-way elimination match for the NWA World Heavyweight Championship	13:18
(c) / – the champion(s) heading into the match; D / – this was a dark match; P / – the match was broadcast on the pre-show

=== Iron Man match ===
Score		Point winner	Decision	Notes	Time
Angle	Joe	Point winner	Decision	Notes	Time
0	1	Samoa Joe	Submission	Joe submitted Angle to the Coquina Clutch	12:53
1	1	Kurt Angle	Submission	Angle submitted Joe to the Ankle Lock	15:44
2	1	Kurt Angle	Submission	Angle submitted Joe to another Ankle Lock	18:55
2	2	Samoa Joe	Pinfall	Joe pinned Angle after the Muscle Buster	22:19
3	2	Kurt Angle	Pinfall	Angle pinned Joe with an inside cradle	24:40
