= Impact Zone =

Sound stages at Universal Studios Florida

Coordinates: 28°28′29″N 81°28′8″W

Soundstage 21
- Impact Zone
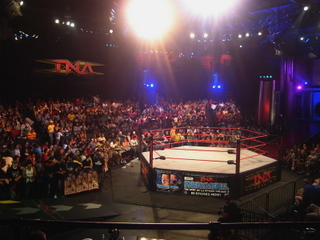
- The Impact Zone in May 2007
- Interactive map of Soundstage 21
- Location: Universal Studios Florida
- Owner: Universal Destinations & Experiences
- Operator: Universal Destinations & Experiences
- Capacity: 1,400

Construction
- Opened: 1990

Tenant
- List: World Championship Wrestling (1995–2001); Xcitement Wrestling Federation (2001–2002); Total Nonstop Action Wrestling (2004–2013); Ring of Honor (2023); All Elite Wrestling (2021–2023)

Soundstage 19
- Impact Zone
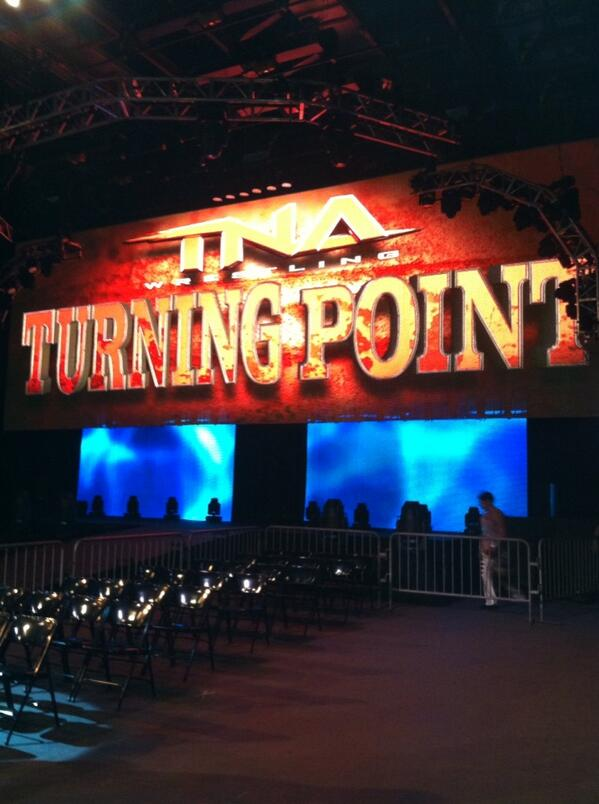
- Soundstage 19 in November 2013
- Interactive map of Soundstage 19
- Location: Universal Studios Florida
- Owner: Universal Destinations & Experiences
- Operator: Universal Destinations & Experiences
- Capacity: 1,100

Construction
- Opened: 1990

Tenant
- List: Total Nonstop Action Wrestling; Ring of Honor (2023); All Elite Wrestling (2021–2023); Professional Fighters League (2025)

Soundstage 20
- Impact Zone
- Interactive map of Soundstage 20
- Location: Universal Studios Florida
- Owner: Universal Destinations & Experiences
- Operator: Universal Destinations & Experiences
- Capacity: 1,100

Construction
- Opened: 1990

Tenant
- Total Nonstop Action Wrestling

The Impact Zone is the nickname for any one of three sound stages at Universal Studios Florida in Orlando; they received this nickname due to their use by the professional wrestling promotion Total Nonstop Action Wrestling (TNA), who taped their weekly television series Impact! at the complex for much of its first two decades of existence.

Universal Studios Florida's soundstages have been used to produce professional wrestling since the 1990s, when the International Wrestling Federation used Soundstage 23 for television tapings in the early 1990s and World Championship Wrestling (WCW) which used Soundstage 21 to tape their syndicated wrestling shows between 1996 and 1998. The most prolific use of the soundstages were between 2004 and 2018, where TNA used Soundstage 21 to tape Impact! and many of their pay-per-view events, before moving to the smaller Soundstage 19 after its 2013 tour; Impact! is now taped in various venues around North America.

In 2021, the site served as the main studio for tapings of the All Elite Wrestling (AEW) online series Dark. In 2023, AEW's sister promotion Ring of Honor (ROH) also began taping its weekly program at the venue. Following the 2023 launch of AEW's second live show, Collision, Dark was cancelled and Ring of Honor tapings were paired with Collision dates across North America.

In 2025, the first rounds of the Professional Fighters League (PFL) World Tournament were held at Soundstage 19.

== History ==
=== World Championship Wrestling (WCW) ===
In 1996, World Championship Wrestling (WCW) began taping their syndicated wrestling shows, WCW Pro and WCW Worldwide, from Soundstage 21, which they called the "WCW Arena". WCW continued to tape the shows and occasional episodes of WCW Saturday Night until 1998, when Pro was canceled and matches for Worldwide were taped before WCW Thunder.

=== Xcitement Wrestling Federation (XWF) ===
On November 12 and 13, 2001, the Xcitement Wrestling Federation (XWF) would tape several matches from Soundstage 21.

=== Total Nonstop Action Wrestling (TNA) / Impact Wrestling ===
In May 2004, TNA announced that they would be starting their first nationally broadcast television show, TNA Impact on Fox Sports Net which would be taped at Universal Studios as part of an agreement reached with the theme park. Accordingly, TNA leased Soundstage 21 for the purposes of putting on wrestling events for an indefinite period of time.

On January 31, 2013, TNA announced that they would be taping Impact Wrestling from different venues around the United States, with the first live show on March 14, 2013, from the Sears Centre Arena near Chicago. The final episodes from the Impact Zone were filmed on February 28, 2013, and March 7, 2013. TNA returned to Universal Studios on November 21, 2013, now using Soundstage 19. After the April 2018 tapings, Impact would resume touring. Bleachers used in the Impact Zone went on sale on eBay in August.

=== All Elite Wrestling (AEW) / Ring of Honor (ROH) ===
On August 27, 2021, All Elite Wrestling (AEW) announced that their weekly web series, AEW Dark, would be taped at its own set within Universal Studios at Soundstage 19. For the first half of 2023, AEW's sister promotion Ring of Honor (ROH) also taped its weekly show at Soundstage 19.

== Statistics ==
=== List of stages ===
Stage	Size	Capacity	Usage
Soundstage 19	9,934 sq. ft.	1,100	November 2013 – December 2013; January 2017; July 2017 – April 2018
Soundstage 20	16,500 sq. ft.	1,100	March 2014 – October 2016; April 2017
Soundstage 21	22,000 sq. ft.	1,400	June 2004 – March 2013; March 2017

=== List of live pay-per-view events held in the Impact Zone ===
Date	Event	Stage	Notes
2004
November 7, 2004	Victory Road	Soundstage 21	The first monthly three-hour pay-per-view event produced by the company.
December 5, 2004	Turning Point	Soundstage 21	
2005
January 16, 2005	Final Resolution	Soundstage 21	
February 13, 2005	Against All Odds	Soundstage 21	
March 13, 2005	Destination X	Soundstage 21	
April 24, 2005	Lockdown	Soundstage 21	
May 15, 2005	Hard Justice	Soundstage 21	
June 19, 2005	Slammiversary	Soundstage 21	
July 17, 2005	No Surrender	Soundstage 21	
August 14, 2005	Sacrifice	Soundstage 21	
September 11, 2005	Unbreakable	Soundstage 21	
October 23, 2005	Bound for Glory	Soundstage 21	
November 13, 2005	Genesis	Soundstage 21	
December 11, 2005	Turning Point	Soundstage 21	
2006
January 15, 2006	Final Resolution	Soundstage 21	
February 12, 2006	Against All Odds	Soundstage 21	
March 12, 2006	Destination X	Soundstage 21	
April 23, 2006	Lockdown	Soundstage 21	
May 14, 2006	Sacrifice	Soundstage 21	
June 18, 2006	Slammiversary	Soundstage 21	
July 16, 2006	Victory Road	Soundstage 21	
August 13, 2006	Hard Justice	Soundstage 21	A pyrotechnic malfunction during the opening match led to the temporary evacuation of the building and one match being canceled.
September 24, 2006	No Surrender	Soundstage 21	
November 19, 2006	Genesis	Soundstage 21	
December 10, 2006	Turning Point	Soundstage 21	
2007
January 14, 2007	Final Resolution	Soundstage 21	
February 11, 2007	Against All Odds	Soundstage 21	
March 11, 2007	Destination X	Soundstage 21	
May 13, 2007	Sacrifice	Soundstage 21	
July 15, 2007	Victory Road	Soundstage 21	
August 12, 2007	Hard Justice	Soundstage 21	
September 9, 2007	No Surrender	Soundstage 21	
November 11, 2007	Genesis	Soundstage 21	
December 2, 2007	Turning Point	Soundstage 21	
2008
January 6, 2008	Final Resolution	Soundstage 21	
May 11, 2008	Sacrifice	Soundstage 21	
November 9, 2008	Turning Point	Soundstage 21	
December 7, 2008	Final Resolution	Soundstage 21	The company changed its PPV schedule; there were two Final Resolution events held that year.
2009
February 8, 2009	Against All Odds	Soundstage 21	
March 15, 2009	Destination X	Soundstage 21	
May 24, 2009	Sacrifice	Soundstage 21	
July 19, 2009	Victory Road	Soundstage 21	
August 16, 2009	Hard Justice	Soundstage 21	
September 20, 2009	No Surrender	Soundstage 21	
November 15, 2009	Turning Point	Soundstage 21	
December 20, 2009	Final Resolution	Soundstage 21	
2010
January 17, 2010	Genesis	Soundstage 21	The show featured the return of a standard four-sided ring.
February 14, 2010	Against All Odds	Soundstage 21	
March 21, 2010	Destination X	Soundstage 21	
May 16, 2010	Sacrifice	Soundstage 21	
June 13, 2010	Slammiversary	Soundstage 21	
July 11, 2010	Victory Road	Soundstage 21	
August 8, 2010	Hardcore Justice	Soundstage 21	
September 5, 2010	No Surrender	Soundstage 21	
November 7, 2010	Turning Point	Soundstage 21	
December 5, 2010	Final Resolution	Soundstage 21	
2011
January 9, 2011	Genesis	Soundstage 21	
February 13, 2011	Against All Odds	Soundstage 21	
March 13, 2011	Victory Road	Soundstage 21	
May 15, 2011	Sacrifice	Soundstage 21	
June 12, 2011	Slammiversary	Soundstage 21	
July 10, 2011	Destination X	Soundstage 21	The show featured a one-night return of the six-sided ring that the company was not using at the time.
August 7, 2011	Hardcore Justice	Soundstage 21	
September 11, 2011	No Surrender	Soundstage 21	
November 13, 2011	Turning Point	Soundstage 21	
December 11, 2011	Final Resolution	Soundstage 21	
2012
January 8, 2012	Genesis	Soundstage 21	
February 12, 2012	Against All Odds	Soundstage 21	
March 18, 2012	Victory Road	Soundstage 21	
May 13, 2012	Sacrifice	Soundstage 21	
July 8, 2012	Destination X	Soundstage 21	
August 12, 2012	Hardcore Justice	Soundstage 21	
September 9, 2012	No Surrender	Soundstage 21	
November 11, 2012	Turning Point	Soundstage 21	
December 9, 2012	Final Resolution	Soundstage 21	
2013
January 13, 2013	Genesis	Soundstage 21	The final live pay-per-view event held in the original Impact Zone before the company began touring.
2014
April 27, 2014	Sacrifice	Soundstage 20	
2015
June 28, 2015	Slammiversary	Soundstage 20	
2016
June 12, 2016	Slammiversary	Soundstage 20	
October 2, 2016	Bound for Glory	Soundstage 20	
2017
January 6, 2017	One Night Only: Live!	Soundstage 19	
July 2, 2017	Slammiversary XV	Soundstage 19	
2018
April 22, 2018	Redemption	Soundstage 19	

== Notes ==
1.The numbers represent the approximate maximum capacities and do not reflect the actual attendance at the events.
