= D-Von Dudley =

American professional wrestler (born 1972)

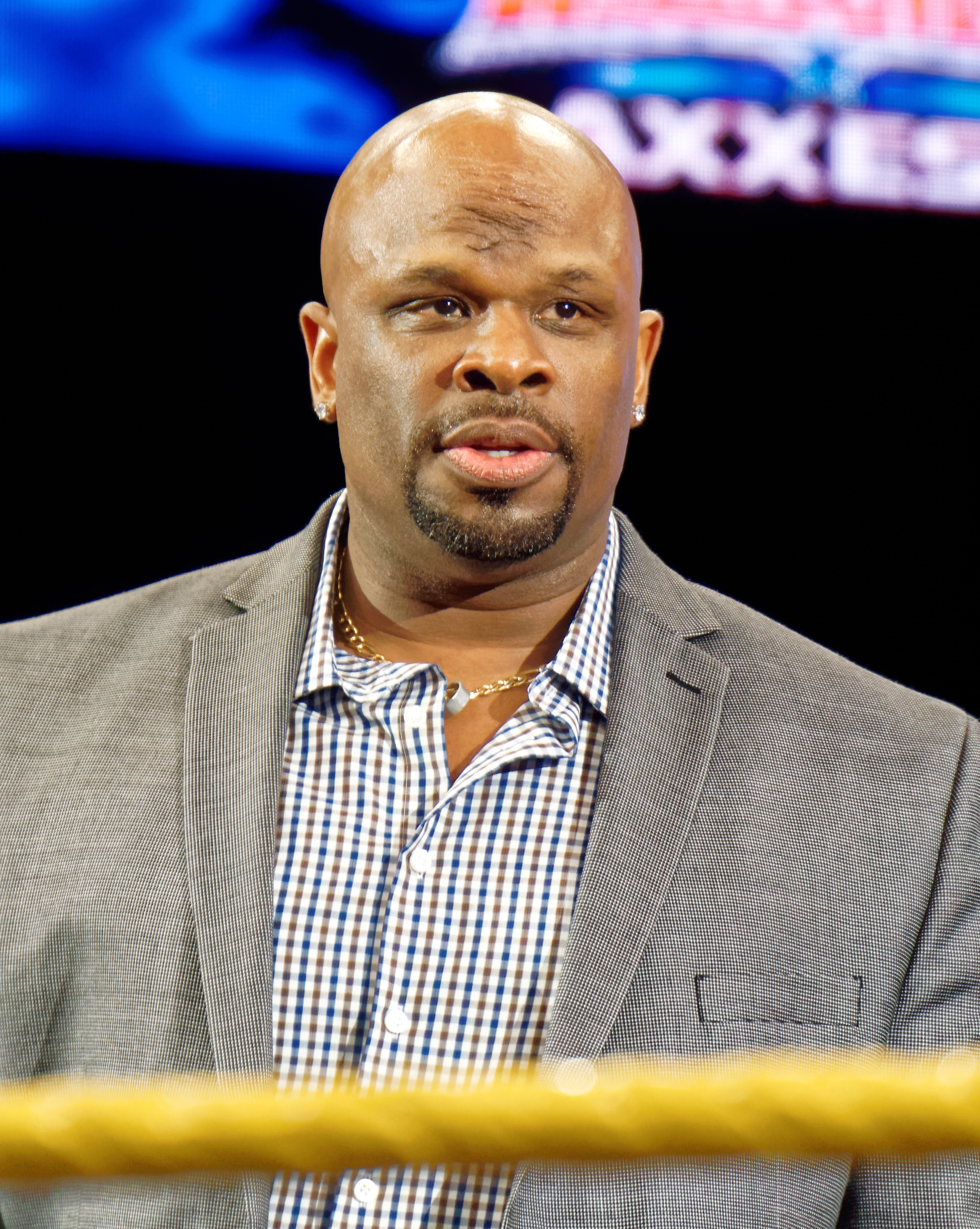
- Devon in 2016

Personal information
- Born: Devon Hughes; August 1, 1972 (age 54) New Rochelle, New York, U.S.
- Spouse: Taylor Hughes (m. 2021)
- Children: 7, including Terrell Hughes and Terrence Hughes

Professional wrestling career
- Ring name(s): Brother Devon; Devon; D-Von Dudley; Reverend D-Von
- Billed height: 6 ft 2 in (1.88 m)
- Billed weight: 269 lb (122 kg)
- Billed from: Dudleyville (as D-Von Dudley in WWF/E); New York, New York (as Brother Devon/Devon) "The Southside of Dudleyville" (as D-Von Dudley in ECW)
- Trained by: Johnny Rodz
- Debut: 1991
- Retired: October 12, 2025

YouTube information
- Channel: D-Von Dudley
- Years active: 2024–present
- Genre: Professional wrestling
- Subscribers: 204 thousand
- Views: 51 million
- Last updated: July 31, 2025

Devon Hughes (/ˈdiːvɒn/ DEE-von; born August 1, 1972) is an American retired professional wrestler. He is signed to WWE under a legends contract. He is best known for performing in Extreme Championship Wrestling (ECW) from 1995 to 1999 and for the World Wrestling Federation (WWF) eventually renamed to World Wrestling Entertainment (WWE) as an in-ring competitor from 1999 to 2005 and from 2015 to 2016 as D-Von Dudley and Reverend D-Von. He also performed with Total Nonstop Action Wrestling (TNA) from 2005 to 2014 as Brother Devon and Devon.

Hughes is an accomplished tag-team wrestler, notably achieving a majority of his success with Mark LoMonaco (best known as Bubba Ray Dudley, Brother Ray and Bully Ray) as part of the Dudley Boyz (known as Team 3D in TNA), with the team characterized by their unorthodox ring attire, hard-hitting style and usage of tables in their matches. He is recognized by TNA as a 23-time world tag-team champion, and became part of the first tag team inducted into the TNA Hall of Fame. They are considered one of the major teams that revived tag-team wrestling during the Attitude Era. Including his two TNA Television Championship reigns, Hughes has held 25 major championships between ECW, WWE, TNA and New Japan Pro-Wrestling (NJPW). Hughes and LoMonaco were inducted into the WWE Hall of Fame in 2018 as part of the Dudley Boyz.

== Professional wrestling career ==
=== Training and early career (1991–1996) ===
Hughes was trained by Johnny Rodz and began wrestling in 1991, competing in independent promotions in the Northeast. In 1995, he won his first title, the WWO International Heavyweight Championship in New Jersey.

=== Extreme Championship Wrestling (1996–1999) ===
In March 1996, Hughes debuted in Extreme Championship Wrestling, wrestling on a house show as "A-Train". On April 13, 1996, at Massacre on Queens Boulevard, Hughes reappeared as "D-Von Dudley" (sometimes spelled "Devon"). His character was based on Jules Winnfield, the Bible-quoting hitman portrayed by Samuel L. Jackson in the 1994 film Pulp Fiction. Dudley feuded with the other members of Dudley Brothers (his kayfabe half-brothers), claiming that their comedic antics were not the way true Dudleys should act, and faced Buh Buh Ray Dudley on numerous occasions, defeating him at Ultimate Jeopardy, but losing to him at November to Remember. Dudley eliminated Chubby Dudley and Dances with Dudley before joining forces with Buh Buh Ray, Big Dick Dudley, Sign Guy Dudley, and Joel Gertner.

Known collectively as the Dudley Boyz, D-Von and Buh Buh Ray dominated the ECW tag team division, winning the ECW World Tag Team Championship a record eight times and defeating teams such as The Eliminators and The Gangstas. D-Von, Buh Buh Ray, and Gertner all achieved a degree of infamy for their vitriolic interviews that antagonized audiences to a point of near riot.

=== World Wrestling Federation/Entertainment (1999–2005) ===
==== The Dudley Boyz (1999–2002) ====
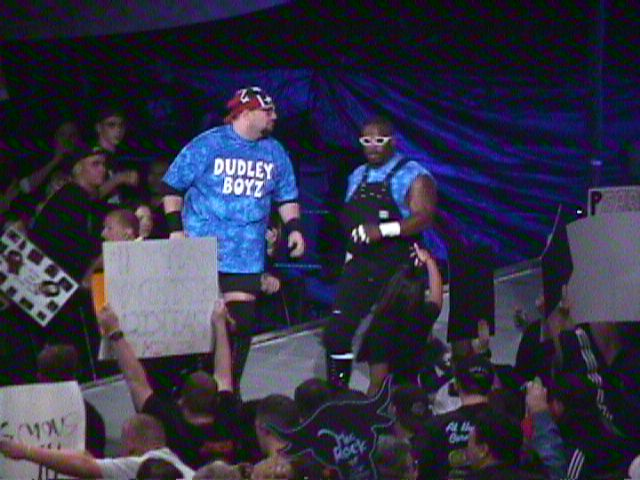
The Dudley Boyz (D-Von on the right) briefly carried their tie-dyed outfits from ECW into the WWF before dropping them for camouflage attire

In mid-1999, Bubba Ray and D-Von left ECW following a pay dispute, and he debuted in the World Wrestling Federation (WWF) in September. Throughout 2000 and 2001, the Dudley Boyz engaged in a three-way feud for the WWF Tag Team Championship with the Hardy Boyz and Edge & Christian. The feud incorporated the first triangle ladder match at WrestleMania 2000, and two Tables, Ladders, and Chairs matches, the first coming at SummerSlam in August 2000 and the second at WrestleMania X-Seven. While they were initially villains and were known for driving women through tables, the Dudley Boyz became fan favorites in early 2000. In early 2001, they were joined by Spike Dudley. At Survivor Series, the Dudley Boyz won the WWF Tag Team Championship, which they unified with the WCW Tag Team Championship during The Invasion, a storyline where the wrestlers from World Championship Wrestling (WCW) and Extreme Championship Wrestling (ECW) invaded the WWF.

==== Singles competition (2002) ====
Following WrestleMania X8, the company divided the roster into two brands, Raw and SmackDown! in March 2002. The Dudley Boyz were separated when D-Von was drafted to the SmackDown! brand and Bubba Ray ended up on the Raw brand. D-Von became a villainous reverend character under the name Reverend D-Von initially serving as Mr. McMahon's "spiritual advisor", and later alongside his protégé Deacon Batista. Though the gimmick was a launching platform for Batista's career, it didn't last long, and Reverend D-Von was betrayed by Batista. He did pick up one of his most memorable individual victories of his WWE career when he pinned Triple H on May 9, 2002, on SmackDown! after Chris Jericho hit Triple H with Reverend D-Von's collection box.

==== Return of The Dudley Boyz (2002–2005) ====
He eventually turned face after he reunited with Bubba Ray and Spike on November 17, 2002, at Survivor Series, when he helped Bubba Ray, Spike and Jeff Hardy defeat 3-Minute Warning and Rico in a tables match. The Dudley Boyz then became a stable in the Raw tag team division over the next 16 months, feuding with teams such as 3-Minute Warning, La Résistance, and various combinations of The Un-Americans. They held the World Tag Team Championship several more times before being traded (along with Booker T) to SmackDown! on March 22, 2004, in exchange for Triple H.

After getting drafted to Smackdown, The Dudley Boyz turned heel once again by aligning with Paul Heyman. On May 27, 2004, the Dudley Boyz kidnapped Paul Bearer, the manager of Heyman's enemy The Undertaker. On June 27, 2004, at The Great American Bash, The Undertaker defeated the Dudley Boyz in a handicap match. They also won the WWE Tag Team Championship one more time but were upset by the high-flying team of Paul London and Billy Kidman. In July 2004, the Dudley Boyz reunited with Spike. For the remainder of the year, they assisted Spike in his matches for the WWE Cruiserweight Championship.

In early 2005, the Dudley Boyz were removed from WWE television and sent to Ohio Valley Wrestling while the WWE creative team attempted to devise a storyline for them. The Dudley Boyz returned to WWE television in June 2005 in order to promote ECW One Night Stand, an ECW reunion show. In the weeks preceding ECW One Night Stand they, along with several other ECW alumni, vied with former WCW President Eric Bischoff and his "anti-hardcore crusaders". At ECW One Night Stand on June 12, the Dudley Boyz defeated Tommy Dreamer and The Sandman in the main event.

On July 5, 2005, WWE announced that it had opted not to continue contract renewal negotiations with the Dudley Boyz. Concurrently, fifteen other wrestlers were released by WWE, which was decreasing its budget due to its shortfall. In August 2005, they were issued with legal notices instructing them not to use the (WWE trademarked) name "Dudley". This led to a degree of acrimony between the former Dudleys and their erstwhile employers, as they had used the names since 1996, several years before all ECW intellectual property was acquired by WWE in 2003 as a result of bankruptcy proceedings. Both believed Paul Heyman had granted them the rights to the name. Soon afterwards, the duo announced that they intended to pursue legal action against WWE.

=== Total Nonstop Action Wrestling (2005–2014; 2023) ===
==== Team 3D (2005–2010) ====
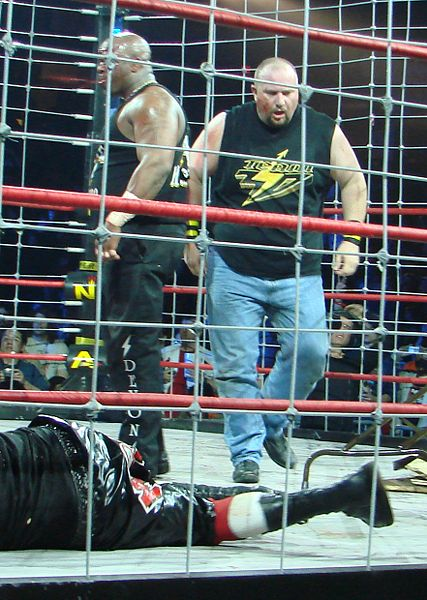
Devon and Bully Ray in a steel cage at Lockdown in April 2007

No longer able to use the ring name "D-Von Dudley", Hughes adopted (and trademarked) the ring name Brother Devon Deadly, while LoMonaco became "Brother Ray Deadly". The team also trademarked "The Deadly Brothers" and "Deadly Death Drop". In August and September 2005, Devon and Ray made several appearances on the independent circuit, most notably Hardcore Homecoming, an unofficial ECW reunion show organized by ECW alumnus Shane Douglas, who frequent was critical of WWE and Chairman Vince McMahon. On September 21, Hughes (together with LoMonaco) signed with Total Nonstop Action Wrestling (TNA), under the name of "Brother Devon".

Devon and Ray debuted in TNA on the October 8 episode of TNA Impact!. Team 3D quickly established themselves as fan favorites by confronting NWA World Heavyweight Champion Jeff Jarrett and his allies, the NWA World Tag Team Champions, America's Most Wanted. Team 3D defeated AMW at pay-per-view events in November and December but failed to defeat them in a title match at Final Resolution on January 15, 2006, due to the interference of Team Canada. Devon and Ray continued to feud with America's Most Wanted and Team Canada over the following months. On the April 13 episode of Impact!, an attempted ambush by Team Canada was foiled by the debuting Spike Dudley, identified as "Brother Runt".

Devon and Ray then took time off to tour Japan, before returning to compete in tag team matches on Impact! and soon began feuding with NWA World Tag Team Champions The Latin American Xchange (LAX). At Final Resolution, they beat LAX by disqualification. Subsequently, they lost to LAX in a "Little Italy Street Fight" at Against All Odds, and a "Ghetto Brawl" at Destination X. At Lockdown, Team 3D defeated LAX in a Steel Cage match to win the NWA World Tag Team Championship. They were the final NWA World Tag Team Champions in TNA as on May 13, 2007, the NWA stripped them of the Tag Titles and Christian Cage of the NWA World Heavyweight Title due to Cage's refusal to defend the title in NWA territories, and cut business ties with TNA. The successfully defended their status as World Tag Team Champions at Sacrifice later that evening. Because of this, TNA awarded Team 3D the new TNA World Tag Team Championships and crowned them as the first champions. They feuded with several tag teams before losing the belts to Samoa Joe at Victory Road.

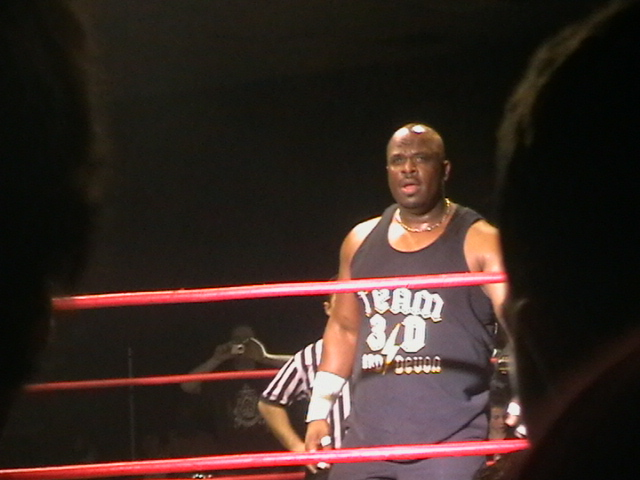
Devon at a house show in Dublin in January 2009

At Final Resolution, they teamed with Johnny Devine and took part in an Ultimate X match against The Motor City Machine Guns and "Black Machismo". They won by taking the X Division belt down with a ladder while the referee was not looking. At Against All Odds, a rematch took place in a Hardcore Street Fight. Early in the match, the Motor City Machine Guns were 'taken out' with two 3-Ds, leaving Jay Lethal to singlehandedly save the X-Division. As a result of their loss at AAO, both Devon and Ray were subjected to weigh-ins prior to their matches. If they weighed in over 275 pounds, they would be unable to compete. During this time, they engaged in a feud with Christopher Daniels under his Curry Man gimmick, and Shark Boy. At Destination X, Team 3D was given an ultimatum when Curry Man and Shark Boy won an elimination match to choose the stipulation for each of the wrestlers matches; if they weighed in at over 275 pounds, the duo would be fired; but if they weighed in under, they would never again be subjected to the weigh-ins. They were able to weigh in under the mark, but Team 3D would end up losing to Curry Man and Shark Boy after a blinded Ray accidentally helped Curry Man hit Devon with the 3-D.

On the November 28 episode of Impact!, Team 3D turned into fan favorites, joining The Front Line. After appearing to join The Main Event Mafia, they double-crossed them, and attacked along with The Front Line leaders Samoa Joe, AJ Styles and Rhino. At Lockdown Team 3D won the TNA World Tag Team Championship and retained the IWGP Tag Team Championship against Beer Money, Inc. (Robert Roode and James Storm). At Slammiversary they lost the TNA tag titles to Beer Money, Inc. and on the July 30 edition of Impact! the IWGP tag titles to The British Invasion of Brutus Magnus and Doug Williams. On October 18, 2009, at Bound for Glory, Team 3D captured their 24th tag team championship when they defeated Beer Money, British Invasion, and The Main Event Mafia's Scott Steiner and Booker T in a Full Metal Mayhem Tag Team match. With both the IWGP and TNA Tag tiles on the line, they captured the IWGP titles which were formerly held by The British Invasion. During the following weeks, Team 3D turned heel and aligned themselves with Rhino in a battle against the younger talent of the company. On the November 19 edition of Impact! Team 3D Academy of Professional Wrestling and Sports Entertainment graduate Jesse Neal joined Team 3D and Rhino and two weeks later Suicide joined Morgan, Hernandez and D'Angelo Dinero to level the playing field. At Final Resolution Morgan, Hernandez, Dinero and Suicide defeated Neal, Team 3D and Rhino in an eight-man elimination tag team match. On January 4, 2010, at Wrestle Kingdom IV in Tokyo Dome Team 3D lost the IWGP Tag Team Title to No Limit (Tetsuya Naito and Yujiro) in a three-way hardcore match that also included Bad Intentions (Giant Bernard and Karl Anderson). When Hulk Hogan and Eric Bischoff took over TNA at the beginning of 2010, Team 3D's angle with Rhino and Neal was discontinued and they reverted to being faces, while starting a feud with The Nasty Boys (Brian Knobs and Jerry Sags), who were a part of the new wave of wrestlers brought in by Hogan and Bischoff. At Against All Odds The Nasty Boys defeated Team 3D in a tag team match, when Jimmy Hart made his return to the company and interfered in the match on the Nasty Boys' behalf. Team 3D avenged their loss on the February 25 edition of Impact!, when Jesse Neal helped them defeat the Nasty Boys in a tables match. On the March 15 edition of Impact! Team 3D and Neal were scheduled to face the Nasty Boys and Hart in a six-man tag team match, but prior to the match the Nasty Boys attacked Neal backstage and put him through a table. Team 3D found Neal a replacement in the returning Brother Runt, but were still defeated in the match by the Nastys and Hart. However, after the match Neal made the save for Team 3D and helped them put Sags through a table. In May Ray turned heel by attacking Neal, while Devon remained a face and stood up for his student against his brother. At Victory Road Devon faced Jesse Neal and Ray in a three-way match. During the match the members of Team 3D attacked each other, before Neal accidentally speared Devon and was then pinned by Ray. On the following edition of Impact! Devon joined fellow ECW alumni Mick Foley, Tommy Dreamer, Raven, Stevie Richards, Rhino, Pat Kenney and Al Snow and TNA World Heavyweight Champion Rob Van Dam in attacking Abyss, Brother Ray and the rest of the TNA locker room. The following week, Ray declined Devon's offer to join the ECW alumni, before TNA president, Dixie Carter, agreed to give the ECW alumni their own reunion pay–per–view event, Hardcore Justice: The Last Stand, as a celebration of hardcore wrestling and a final farewell to the company. However, on the July 29 edition of Impact! Ray decided to join the ECW alumni and seemingly buried the hatchet with his brother. On August 8 at Hardcore Justice Team 3D, accompanied by Joel Gertner, defeated Axl Rotten and Balls Mahoney, billed as Kahoneys, in a South Philadelphia Street Fight. After the match Devon and Ray were assaulted by the Gangstas. On the following edition of Impact!, the ECW alumni, known collectively as Extreme, Version 2.0 (EV 2.0), were assaulted by A.J. Styles, Kazarian, Robert Roode, James Storm, Douglas Williams and Matt Morgan of Ric Flair's Fourtune stable, who thought they didn't deserve to be in TNA. This would mark Team 3D's final appearance on their old TNA contracts, which expired shortly thereafter. The two then entered negotiations over new contracts. Team 3D returned to TNA television two month later on the October 7 live edition of Impact!, promising a major announcement at Bound for Glory. At the pay-per-view Team 3D announced their retirement, but asked for a one final match against the TNA World Tag Team Champions, the Motor City Machine Guns. Their new multi–year contracts with TNA were confirmed shortly thereafter. At Turning Point the Motor City Machine Guns defeated Team 3D to retain the TNA World Tag Team Championship.

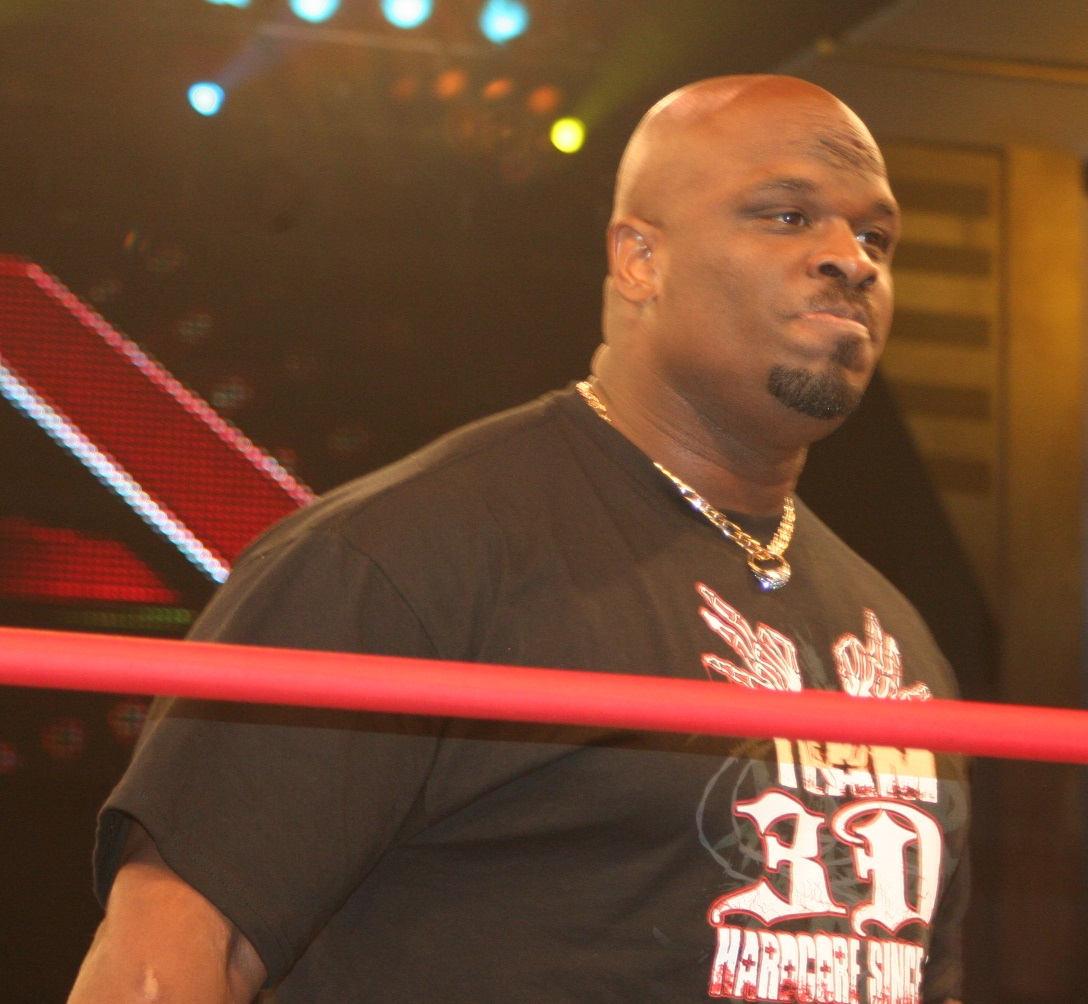
Devon in July 2010

==== Television Champion (2010–2012) ====
During Team 3D's retirement ceremony on the following edition of Impact!, Ray turned heel by attacking Devon, reigniting the feud between the two. The following week Ray claimed that Devon had gotten weak, since Sabin had managed to kick out of a 3D at Turning Point, calling him the Marty Jannetty and himself the Shawn Michaels of the team. On January 9, 2011, at Genesis, Devon was disqualified in his match against his former partner, now known as Bully Ray, after using Ray's own chain against him. In the following weeks Devon's sons Terrence and Terrell began making appearances on Impact! and were regularly abused by Ray. At Against All Odds Devon faced his former tag team partner in a Street Fight. After Devon's sons Terrell and Terrence interfered in the match, Ray low-blowed him and pinned one of his sons for the win. On March 13 at Victory Road, Devon and his sons interfered in a Falls Count Anywhere match between Ray and Tommy Dreamer, costing Ray the match. On the following edition of Impact!, the feud between the former members of Team 3D was seemingly ended as Ray joined Immortal and moved on to feuding with Fortune.

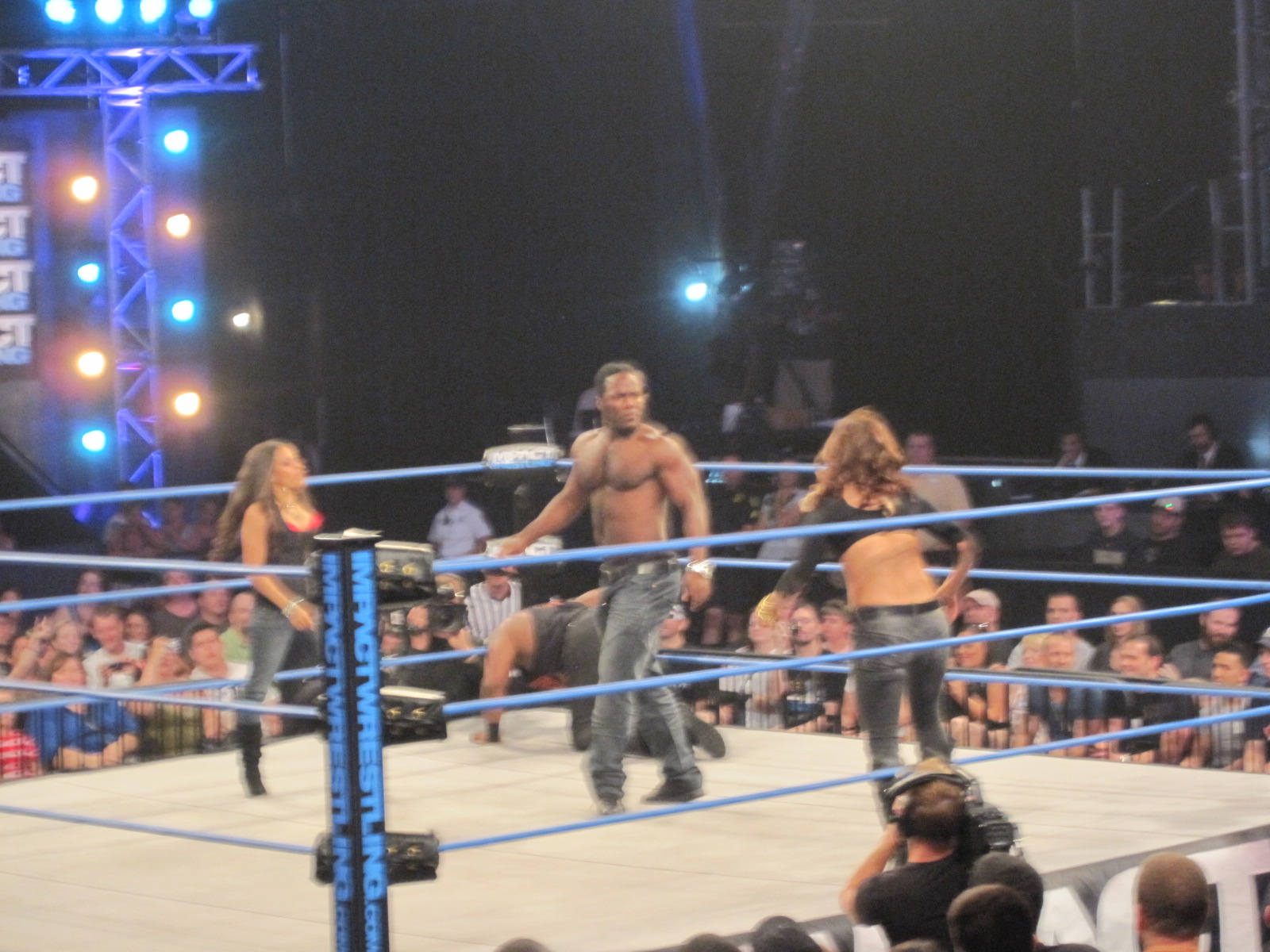
D'Angelo Dinero saving Devon from Mexican America

In June, Devon entered a storyline where he was saved from Mexican America by D'Angelo Dinero, despite the fact that he had previously declined his help, claiming that he was a bad influence on his sons. Later that month, Devon and Dinero were both entered into the Bound for Glory Series to determine the number one contender for the TNA World Heavyweight Championship, during the course of which Dinero handed Devon a win in a tag team match, but Devon did not return the favor and save Dinero from a post-match assault at the hands of Samoa Joe. During the tournament, Devon also picked up impressive victories over Samoa Joe and A.J. Styles. On August 7 at Hardcore Justice, Dinero defeated Devon in a Bound for Glory Series match. At the start of the match, Dinero offered to lay down for Devon, but he refused the offer. On the August 25 edition of Impact Wrestling, Devon was forced to pull out of the Bound for Glory Series, after suffering a storyline injury at the hands of Samoa Joe, who had vowed to ruin the tournament. Later in the event, Devon returned to save Dinero from a similar attack at the hands of Joe. On the September 8 edition of Impact Wrestling, Devon and Dinero defeated The British Invasion to become the number one contenders to the TNA World Tag Team Championship. On September 11 at No Surrender, Devon and Dinero failed in their attempt to win the TNA World Tag Team Championship from Anarquia and Hernandez of Mexican America. On the December 1 edition of Impact Wrestling, Devon and Dinero defeated Ink Inc. (Jesse Neal and Shannon Moore) and Mexican America to become the number one contenders to the TNA World Tag Team Championship, now held by the team of Crimson and Matt Morgan. On December 11 at Final Resolution, Devon and Dinero failed to capture the TNA World Tag Team Championship. On the following edition of Impact Wrestling, Dinero and Devon's sons Terrence and Terrell joined forces and turned on Devon. On January 8, 2012, at Genesis, Terrence and Terrell turned on Dinero and helped their father defeat him in a singles match.

On March 18, at Victory Road, Devon answered Robbie E's open challenge and defeated him to win the TNA Television Championship, marking Devon's first major singles championship. On April 15 at Lockdown, Devon defeated Robbie in a rematch, contested inside a steel cage, to retain the title. On the following episode of Impact Wrestling, general manager Hulk Hogan announced that from then on the Television Championship would be defended every week on the program. Devon started his series of defenses by defeating Gunner. During the next month, Devon developed a rivalry with Robbie E and Robbie T, successfully defending the Television Championship against each of them in singles matches on Impact Wrestling and finally in a three-way match on May 13 at Sacrifice. On the May 24 episode of Impact Wrestling, Robbie E and Robbie T interfered in a TNA Television Championship match between Devon and Garett Bischoff, causing the match to end in a no contest. Following the match, Devon and Bischoff united to fend off the attack by the two. The following week, the Robbies also interfered in Devon's title defense against Jeff Hardy, causing another no contest. On the June 7 episode of Impact Wrestling, Devon successfully defended the Television Championship against Robbie E, following outside interference from Garett Bischoff. Three days later at Slammiversary, Devon and Bischoff defeated the Robbies in a tag team match. Devon's weekly Television Championship defenses ended after the June 14 episode of Impact Wrestling, where he successfully defended the title against Hernandez. Devon returned to Impact Wrestling on August 9, when he and Garett Bischoff unsuccessfully challenged Christopher Daniels and Kazarian for the TNA World Tag Team Championship. Three days later at Hardcore Justice, Devon successfully defended the TNA Television Championship against Kazarian. On August 29, Devon, still the reigning TNA Television Champion, announced that he had parted ways with TNA, after his contract with the promotion had expired the previous day and the two could not come to terms on a new one. With Devon still being recognized as the TNA Television Champion, on September 15, 2012, he became the longest reigning champion in the title's history, beating Eric Young's record of 180 days as champion. On September 26, TNA officially stripped Devon of the Television Championship, ending his reign at 192 days.

==== Aces & Eights (2012–2013) ====
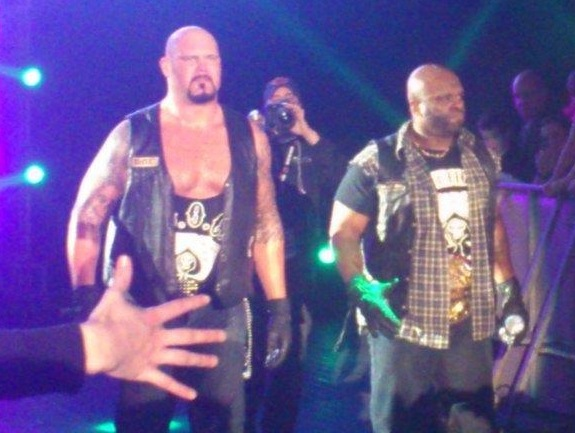
Devon as Television Champion with Aces & Eights member DOC

On October 14 at Bound for Glory, Devon returned to TNA turning heel, when he attacked Bully Ray and Sting, costing them their tag team match against the heel Aces & Eights stable, who, as a result, earned full access to TNA. Devon, the first unmasked member of Aces & Eights, wrestled his first match back in the main event of the following episode of Impact Wrestling, losing to Sting via disqualification following interference from Aces & Eights. On November 1, Devon and Bully Ray faced off in the main event of Impact Wrestling, however, the match ended in a brawl between the Aces & Eights and the TNA locker room. On November 11 at Turning Point, Devon was defeated by Kurt Angle in singles match via submission, despite the rest of Aces & Eights trying to interfere. On the December 6 episode of Impact Wrestling, Devon defeated Samoa Joe to win his second Television Championship, after Aces & Eights member DOC hit Joe with a ball-peen hammer. Three days later at Final Resolution, Devon teamed with DOC and two masked members of Aces & Eights in a losing effort to Kurt Angle, Garett Bischoff, Samoa Joe, and Wes Brisco. On the December 20 episode of Impact Wrestling, Devon successfully defended the Television Championship against Kurt Angle, following interference from Aces & Eights, Garett Bischoff, Samoa Joe, and Wes Brisco. On January 13, 2013, at Genesis, Devon defeated Joseph Park in a non-title match. On the February 7 episode of Impact Wrestling, Devon and DOC were defeated by Bully Ray and Sting in a Tables match. On March 10 at Lockdown, Aces & Eights, consisting of Devon, DOC, Garett Bischoff, Mike Knox, and Mr. Anderson were defeated by Team TNA, consisting of Sting, Eric Young, James Storm, Magnus, and Samoa Joe in a Lethal Lockdown match. On the April 18 episode of Impact Wrestling, Devon was scheduled to defend his Television Championship against Magnus, however, he was attacked by DOC and Knox before the match could start. Samoa Joe was then awarded the title match in his place, but Devon retained the title after interference from Aces & Eights. On June 2 at Slammiversary XI, Devon was originally booked to defend his title against Joseph Park but Park was attacked by Aces & Eights before the match and Devon was awarded a count-out victory. Following this, Park's brother Abyss returned and defeated Devon to win the Television Championship, ending his reign at 178 days. On the August 22 edition of Impact Wrestling Devon was pinned in the five-on-five match against the Main Event Mafia by AJ Styles and per match stipulations was, in storyline, fired from TNA as a result. Hughes later confirmed that his departure from TNA was legitimate.

==== TNA Hall of Fame (2014) ====
Devon returned to TNA as a face, at Slammiversary XII getting inducted into the TNA Hall of Fame with Bully Ray as Team 3D. It was later announced that he had returned to TNA full-time. Devon made his return to Impact Wrestling saving Bully Ray and Tommy Dreamer from Ethan Carter III and Rhino which culminated in Carter receiving a 3D through a table. At Bound for Glory, Team 3D defeated Abyss and Tommy Dreamer. The event was the final contracted date for each member of Team 3D.

==== Sporadic appearance (2023) ====
At the September 9, 2023 taping of Impact 1000 (aired September 14), Hughes made his return to TNA, now known as Impact Wrestling, after a nine-year absence, teaming up with Bully Ray, effectively reuniting Team 3D, who competed in a winning effort against the returning Desi Hit Squad. After the match they put Rohit Raju through a table.

=== Return to the independent circuit (2013–2016) ===
Devon appeared at House of Hardcore 3, where he and Matt Hardy defeated Homicide and Eddie Kingston. He also came out later that night during Bully Ray's segment involving Tommy Dreamer and Spike Dudley, teasing a confrontation with Bully only for the two to hit Dreamer with a 3D. On June 6, 2014, Devon was scheduled to face Abyss and Tommy Dreamer along with Bully Ray. However, Ray was pulled out of the event, so the main event was Devon and Dreamer vs Rhino and Abyss. Dreamer and Devon won the match. On June 7, 2014, he and CW Anderson defeated Eddie Kingston & Homicide at House of Hardcore 5. On July 13, 2014, Team 3D made their debut in Squared Circle Wrestling, where they won the 2CW Tag Team Championship by defeating Axe and Kevin Steen. On July 26, 2014, Devon defeated Abel Andrew Jackson at Reality of Wrestling's Summer of Champions. On September 6, 2014, Devon made his debut in Wichita Falls, TX for Pure Action Championship Wrestling's Brawl In The Falls III, winning and becoming the promotion's final heavyweight champion.

At House of Hardcore VII, Team 3D made their debut in the promotion. They defeated Killer Elite Squad. On March 8, 2015, Team 3D lost the 2CW Tag Team Championship to The Young Bucks.

On August 28, it was announced that Team 3D would compete for Insane Championship Wrestling at Fear & Loathing IX on November 20, where they challenged Polo Promotions (Jackie Polo and Mark Coffey) for the ICW Tag Team Championship in a losing effort.

On December 17, Hughes wrestled once again as one half of The Dudley Boyz, in a losing effort to capture the House of Glory Tag Team Championship at HOG VI. That match is his last known match to date.

=== Return to WWE (2015–2023; 2024) ===
==== Dudley Boyz reunion (2015–2016) ====
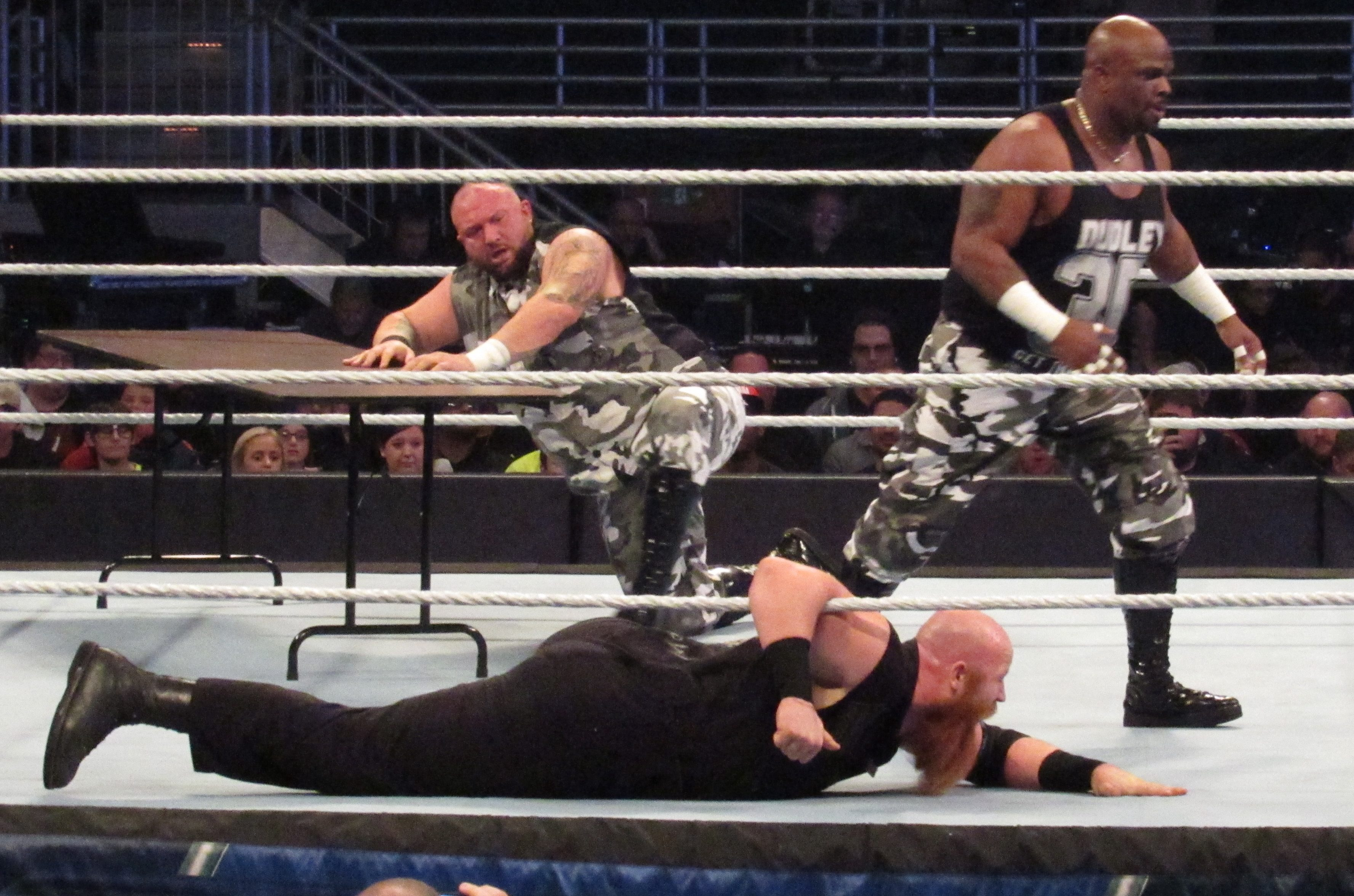
The Dudley Boyz wrestling The Wyatt Family in January 2016

On the August 24, 2015, episode of Raw, D-Von and Bubba Ray made a surprise return to the WWE, reviving their Dudley Boyz tag team persona. They attacked WWE Tag Team Champions The New Day, and gave a 3D through a table on Xavier Woods. On the August 27 episode of SmackDown, they defeated The Ascension and after the match they put Viktor through a table. On the August 31 episode of Raw, they defeated The New Day. After the match they attempted to put Big E through a table with a 3D, but Kofi Kingston and Woods saved him. On the September 17 episode of SmackDown, D-Von quickly defeated Kingston in his first singles match in WWE since 2004, after a distraction by Woods. At both Night of Champions, and Live from Madison Square Garden, the Dudley Boyz challenged The New Day for the WWE Tag Team Championship, but would win both matches by disqualification, which allowed The New Day to retain their titles. At Hell in a Cell, the Dudley Boyz would challenge for the titles again, where they would lose to The New Day. At Survivor Series, the Dudley Boyz would team with Goldust, Neville and Titus O'Neil to defeat Stardust, The Ascension, The Miz and Bo Dallas in a 5-on-5 Traditional Survivor Series Elimination Tag Team Match.

In December, the Dudley Boyz began a feud with The Wyatt Family, and later aligned themselves with the returning Tommy Dreamer and Rhyno in the feud, known as The ECW Originals. At TLC: Tables, Ladders and Chairs, The Wyatt Family defeated The ECW Originals in an 8-Man Elimination Tables Match. At the 2016 Royal Rumble kickoff, the Dudley Boyz, Mark Henry and Jack Swagger, The Ascension and Darren Young and Damien Sandow competed in a Fatal 4-Way Tag Team Match to qualify for the Royal Rumble match itself, in a losing effort.

On the February 8 episode of Raw, the Dudley Boyz attacked The Usos after a match involving them against The New Day and Mark Henry, thus turning heel in the process. Explaining that they did not come back to WWE to be a "nostalgia act" and reminding the fans that they are "the baddest tag team on the planet", the Dudley Boyz abandoned using tables. In the following weeks, the Dudley Boyz and The Usos began a feud, setting up a tag team match between the two teams at WrestleMania 32, where the Dudley Boyz lost to The Usos. The following night on Raw, the Dudley Boyz defeated The Usos in a tables match, breaking their vow to never again use tables and officially ending the feud. Afterwards, the duo were interrupted by the debuting Enzo Amore and Colin Cassady, who proceeded to insult them and ignite a new feud. In a tournament set up by Shane McMahon to determine the new number 1 contenders to the WWE Tag Team Championship, they would defeat The Lucha Dragons to advance to the semi-finals, where they clashed with Enzo Amore and Colin Cassady in a losing effort. On July 19 at the 2016 WWE draft, the Dudley Boyz were drafted to Raw. At SummerSlam, they would lose to Sami Zayn and Neville.

The day after SummerSlam, the Dudley Boyz announced that they were announcing their departure from WWE on that night's Raw. During their farewell segment, they were confronted by The Shining Stars. After receiving insults from The Shining Stars, the Dudley Boyz attacked them, turning face once again in the process. As they set up Primo for a 3D through a table, Luke Gallows and Karl Anderson attacked both Bubba Ray and D-Von, sending D-Von through the table.

==== Producer; Hall of Fame (2016–2023) ====
On September 26, a month following his departure from the company, Hughes would return to WWE as a backstage producer. While mainly working backstage, Hughes occasionally appeared on WWE television to separate brawls between wrestlers.

On January 22, 2018, at Raw 25 Years, the Dudley Boyz returned for one night only, by interrupting a fight between Heath Slater & Rhyno and Titus Worldwide, giving a Dudley Death Drop to Heath Slater through a table. The Dudley Boyz were inducted into the WWE Hall of Fame Class of 2018. In July 2019 during the Raw Reunion, D-Von returned in a one-off appearance to be in the corner of The Revival in a tag team match against The Usos with Rikishi in their corner, in a losing effort. On January 19, 2023, D-Von announced on Twitter that he left WWE.

==== Sporadic appearance (2024) ====
On October 27, 2024, D-Von, as Reverend D-Von, made a special appearance in NXT Champion Trick Williams' diss track video aimed at Ethan Page. At NXT 2300 on November 6, Bubba Ray and Williams lost to Page and Ridge Holland in a tag team match. After the match, Bubba Ray and Williams put Page through a table that was brought to the ring by D-Von, reuniting the Dudley Boyz for the first time in WWE since 2018 in the process.

=== Retirement (2025) ===
Hughes would retire at TNA's Bound for Glory event, where he and Ray wrestled The Hardys (Jeff Hardy and Matt Hardy) in a tables match for the TNA World and NXT Tag Team Championship. The match was named "One Final Table", since it took place 25 years after the first table match between the two teams at the 2000 WWE Royal Rumble. At the event, Ray and Devon lost, retiring from in-ring competition.

== Personal life ==
Hughes's father, Preston, was a bishop, and his mother, Renee Washington, is a pastor. He attended Elwood-John Glenn High School in Elwood, New York. Hughes is married to Taylor Hughes and has three children with her. He also has four sons from a previous marriage, including professional wrestlers Terrell and Terrence. Their names are tattooed on his upper biceps. Terrence and Terrell appeared on the February 3 and 10, 2011, episodes of TNA Impact! and the February 14 pay-per-view Against All Odds, taking part in the storyline feud between their father and D'Angelo Dinero. Terrence and Terrell have gone on to wrestle as enhancement talent for AEW in November 2020.

Hughes opened a smoothie shop, 3D's Power Blendz, in Melbourne, Florida, and with longtime tag team partner Mark LoMonaco, opened a wrestling school, Team 3D Academy of Professional Wrestling and Sports Entertainment, in Kissimmee, Florida.

== Other media ==
Dudley has appeared in numerous wrestling video games. His latest video game appearance is WWE 2K26, alongside Bubba Ray Dudley. In late 2024, he started his YouTube channel, where shares his wrestling career. He has also collaborated with fellow wrestler and YouTuber, Maven Huffman.

== Championships and accomplishments ==
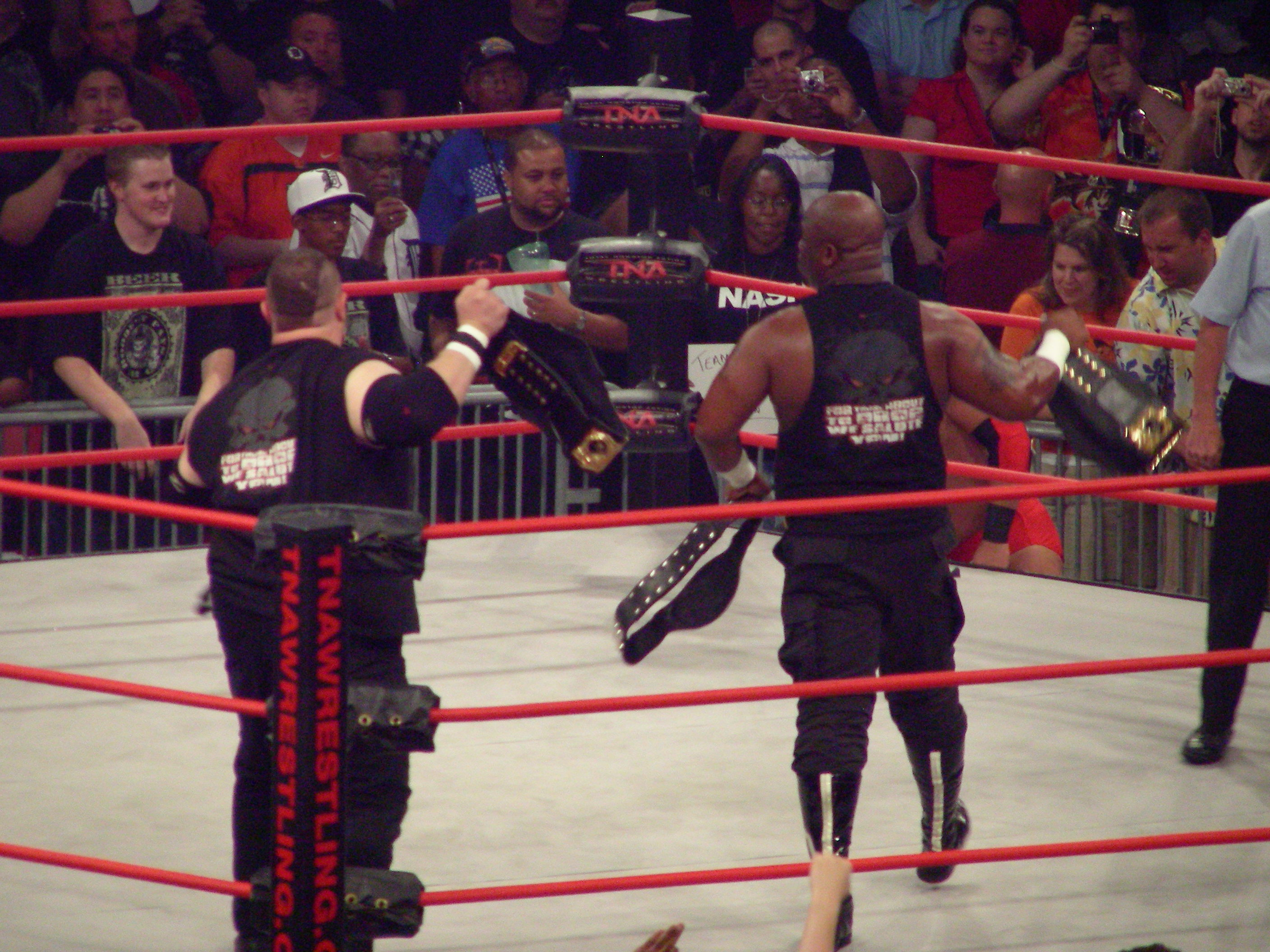
Team 3D as TNA and IWGP Tag Team Champions – titles they held twice each.

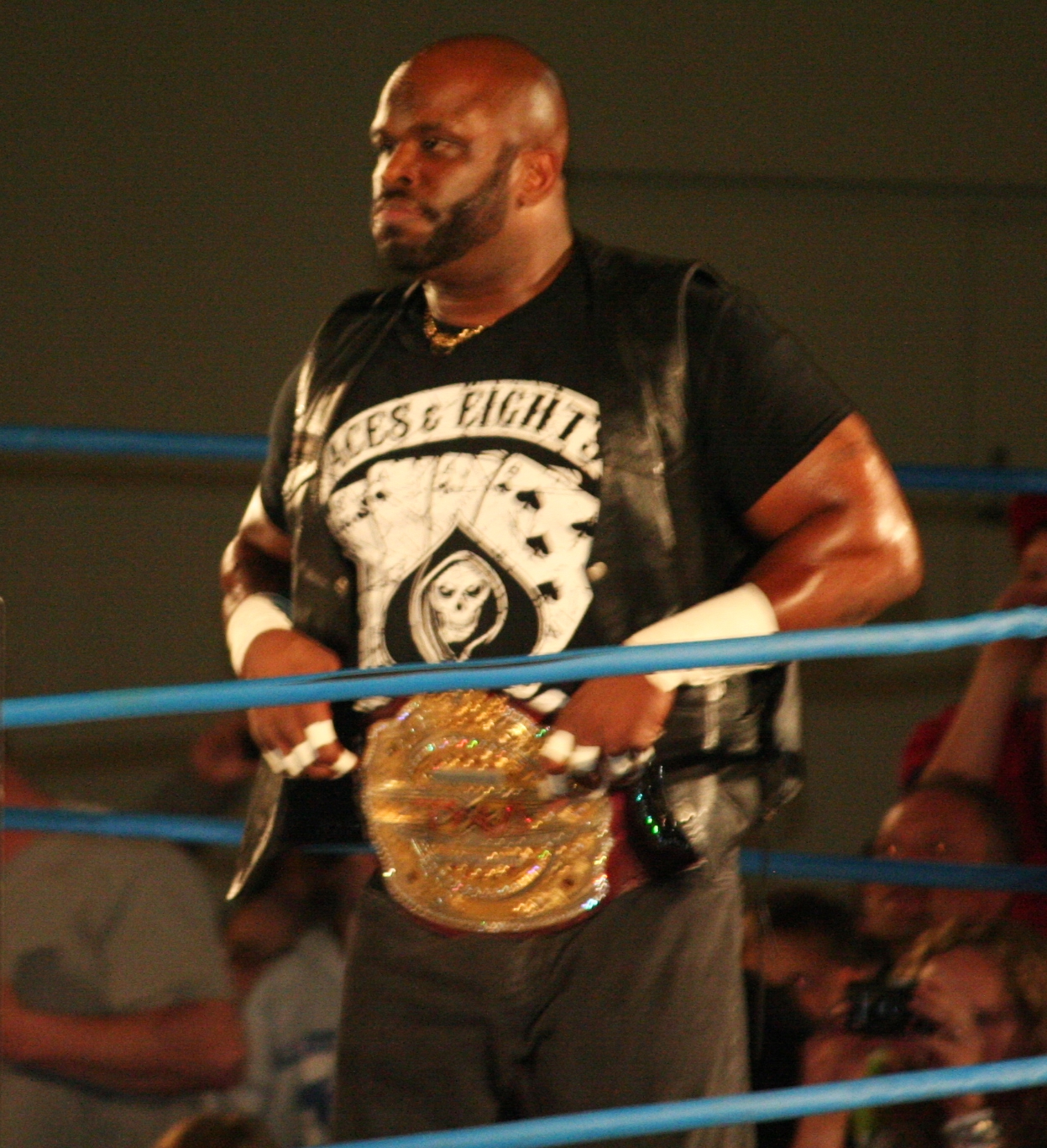
Devon is a two-time TNA Television Champion.

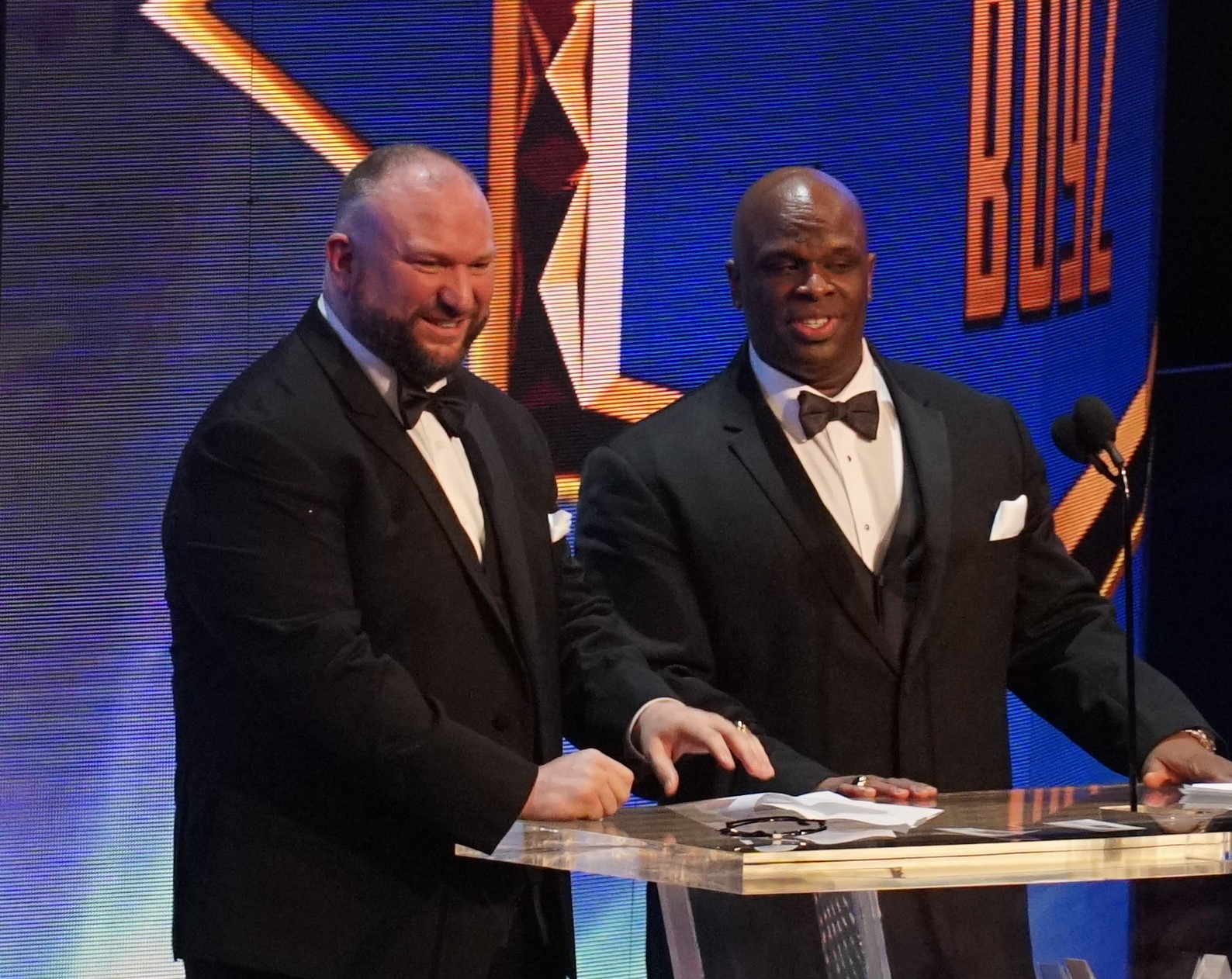
The Dudleys being inducted into the WWE Hall of Fame in 2018

- All Japan Pro Wrestling
  - World's Strongest Tag Determination League (2005) – with Brother Ray
- The Baltimore Sun
  - Tag Team of the Year (2007) – with Brother Ray
- Cauliflower Alley Club
  - Other honoree (1997) – with Buh Buh Ray Dudley
- Extreme Championship Wrestling
  - ECW World Tag Team Championship (8 times) – with Buh Buh Ray Dudley
- Hustle
  - Hustle Super Tag Team Championship (1 time, final) – with Brother Ray
- New Japan Pro-Wrestling
  - IWGP Tag Team Championship (2 times) – with Brother Ray
- Northeast Wrestling
  - New United States Heavyweight Championship (1 time)
- Northern States Wrestling Alliance
  - NSWA United States Heavyweight Championship (1 time)
- Pro Wrestling Illustrated
  - PWI Feud of the Year (2012)Aces & Eights vs. TNA
  - PWI Match of the Year (2000) with Bubba Ray Dudley vs. Edge and Christian and The Hardy Boyz in a Triangle Ladder match at WrestleMania 2000
  - PWI Match of the Year (2001) with Bubba Ray Dudley vs. Edge and Christian and The Hardy Boyz in a Tables, Ladders, and Chairs match at WrestleMania X-Seven
  - PWI Tag Team of the Year (2001, 2009) – with Bubba Ray Dudley
  - Ranked No. 25 of the top 500 singles wrestlers in the PWI 500 in 2012
  - Ranked No. 362 of the top 500 singles wrestlers of the "PWI Years" in 2003
- Pure Action Championship Wrestling
  - PACW Heavyweight Championship (1 time)
- Squared Circle Wrestling
  - 2CW Tag Team Championship (1 time) – with Bully Ray
- Total Nonstop Action Wrestling
  - TNA Television Championship (2 times)
  - TNA World Tag Team Championship (2 times, inaugural) – with Brother Ray
  - NWA World Tag Team Championship (1 time) – with Brother Ray
  - Tag Team Tournament (2013) – with Brother Ray
  - TNA Hall of Fame (2014) – as a member of Team 3D
- World Wrestling Federation/Entertainment/WWE
  - WWF/World Tag Team Championship (8 times) – with Bubba Ray Dudley
  - WWE Tag Team Championship (1 time) – with Bubba Ray Dudley
  - WCW Tag Team Championship (1 time) – with Bubba Ray Dudley
  - WWE Hall of Fame (Class of 2018) as a member of The Dudley Boyz
- World Wrestling Organization
  - WWO International Championship (1 time)
- Wrestling Observer Newsletter
  - Worst Gimmick (2012, 2013) Aces & Eights
  - Worst Worked Match of the Year (2006) TNA Reverse Battle Royal on TNA Impact!
