= America's Most Wanted (disambiguation) =

America's Most Wanted is a television show produced by 20th Century Fox.

America's Most Wanted may also refer to:

- America's Most Wanted (album), by Calvin Richardson, 2010
- America's Most Wanted (professional wrestling), a tag team that competed for Total Nonstop Action Wrestling
- America's Most Wanted (group), an American hip-hop group

== See also ==
- AmeriKKKa's Most Wanted, an album by American rapper Ice Cube
- America's 10 Most Wanted, a 2003 video game
- "2 of Amerikaz Most Wanted", a song by American rappers 2pac and Snoop Dogg
- FBI Ten Most Wanted Fugitives
- FBI Most Wanted Terrorists
- United States Secret Service Most Wanted Fugitives
