= Final Resolution (2005) =

2005 Total Nonstop Action Wrestling pay-per-view event

- Promotional poster featuring Jeff Hardy
- Promotion: Total Nonstop Action Wrestling
- Date: January 16, 2005
- City: Orlando, Florida
- Venue: Impact Zone
- Attendance: 875

Pay-per-view chronology
← Previous; Turning Point	Next → Against All Odds

Final Resolution chronology
← Previous; First	Next → 2006

The 2005 Final Resolution was a professional wrestling pay-per-view (PPV) event produced by Total Nonstop Action Wrestling (TNA), which took place on January 16, 2005 from the Impact Zone in Orlando, Florida. It was the first annual event under the Final Resolution chronology. Nine matches were featured on the event's card.

The main event was a standard wrestling match for the NWA World Heavyweight Championship, in which the champion, Jeff Jarrett, defeated the challenger, Monty Brown to retain the championship. The TNA X Division Championship was contested in an Ultimate X match, in which A.J. Styles defeated Chris Sabin and the champion, Petey Williams. The event's undercard featured different varieties of matches. America's Most Wanted (Chris Harris and James Storm) defeated Team Canada (Bobby Roode and Eric Young) for the NWA World Tag Team Championship on the undercard. Monty Brown defeated Diamond Dallas Page and Kevin Nash in a Three Way Elimination match to challenge Jeff Jarrett for the NWA Championship in the main event.

The professional wrestling section of the Canadian Online Explorer website rated the entire event an 8 out of 10, which was higher than the 2006 event's rating.

== Production ==
=== Background ===
The event featured nine professional wrestling matches that involved different wrestlers from pre-existing scripted feuds, plots, and storylines. Wrestlers were portrayed as either villains or heroes in the scripted events that built tension and culminated in a wrestling match or series of matches.

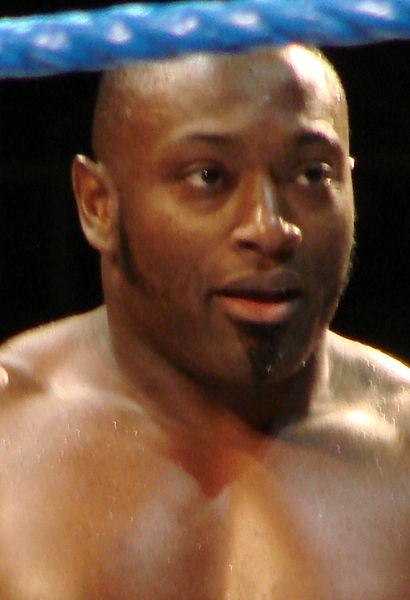
Monty Brown challenged Jeff Jarrett for the NWA World Heavyweight Championship at Final Resolution.

The main event at Final Resolution was a standard wrestling match for the NWA World Heavyweight Championship between the champion, Jeff Jarrett, and the challenger, Monty Brown. On the December 24 episode of TNA's primary television program, TNA Impact!, authority figure Dusty Rhodes announced a Three Way Elimination match for Final Resolution involving Brown, Kevin Nash, and Diamond Dallas Page (DDP). The winner of said match would challenge Jarrett for the NWA World Heavyweight Championship in the main event. A Three Way Elimination match involves three competitors fighting to eliminate each man by pinfall, submission, or throwing one another over the top rope and down to the floor until there is one left. Brown defeated Nash and DDP at Final Resolution to gain the opportunity to challenge Jarrett.

Also on the event's card, the TNA X Division Championship was contested for in an Ultimate X match, with the participants being the champion, Petey Williams, and the two challengers being, A.J. Styles and Chris Sabin. In an Ultimate X match, four pillars are set up at ringside with steel red ropes attached at the top, which are criss-crossed to form an "X" over the center of the ring. The championship belt is hung on the center "X" with the objective being to remove it and fall to the mat below to win. On the December 17 episode of Impact!, Rhodes announced that there was going to be an Ultimate X match at Final Resolution for the TNA X Division Championship. Styles and Williams were scheduled to be in the match after it was announced with Sabin being the only one having to earn the right to be in the match. Sabin defeated Christopher Daniels on the January 14 episode of Impact! to gain entry.

In the tag team division, America's Most Wanted (Chris Harris and James Storm) (AMW) challenged Team Canada (Bobby Roode and Eric Young) for the NWA World Tag Team Championship. On the December 24 episode of Impact!, AMW defeated Team Canada to earn the chance to challenge for the championship at Final Resolution.

== Event ==
Other on-screen personnel
Commentator	Mike Tenay
Commentator	Don West
Ring announcer	Jeremy Borash
Referee	Rudy Charles
Referee	Mark "Slick" Johnson
Referee	Andrew Thomas
Interviewers	Jeremy Borash
Interviewers	Shane Douglas

=== Pre-Show ===
Two matches aired during the thirty-minute pre-show. The first encounter pitted The Naturals (Chase Stevens and Andy Douglas) against Johnny B. Badd and Sonny Siaki. The Naturals won the bout after Stevens bashed Siaki over the head with steel folding chair and then pinned him. A standard wrestling match between Chris Candido and Cassidy Riley followed. Candido was victorious in the bout by pinning Riley after a diving headbutt off the top of a padded turnbuckle.

=== Preliminary matches ===
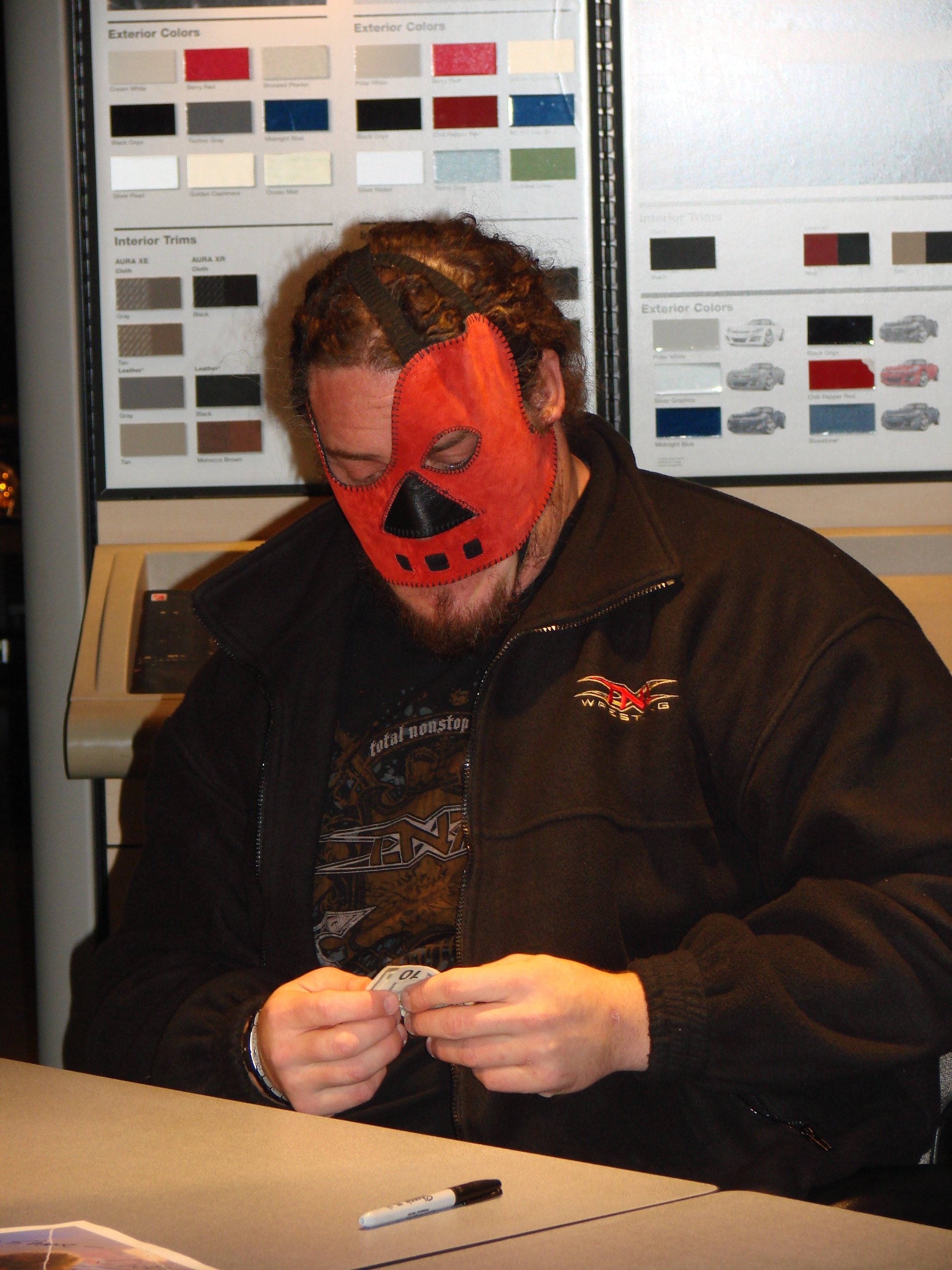
Abyss, who attacked Jeff Hardy after his match with Scott Hall at Final Resolution

The first contest was a Six Man Tag Team match between the team of Ron Killings, Konnan, and B.G. James—The 3 Live Kru (3LK)—and the team of Christopher Daniels, Michael Shane, and Kazarian. The 3LK were the winners by pinfall after Killings kicked Shane in the face.

Elix Skipper fought Sonjay Dutt in the second encounter. Skipper defeated Dutt in the match after he performed a move he calls the Play of the Day, in which he laid his leg on Dutt's head and neck, grabbed Dutt's near arm, and then spun and slammed Dutt to the mat.

The third match was between Dustin Rhodes and Kid Kash. Rhodes claimed victory after grabbing Kash's head and jumping forward to land on his butt to perform a bulldog.

Raven fought Erik Watts in the next contest. Watts won the match by pinfall, after he lifted Raven up by the neck and slammed him down to perform a chokeslam.

Roddy Piper was Special Guest Referee for a bout between Jeff Hardy and Scott Hall, which was the following contest. After the two fought for a few minutes, Hardy gained the pinfall victory after he jumped off the top rope and performed a Swanton Bomb, a high-angle front flip from the top rope, onto Hall who was laying flat against the mat. Abyss attacked Hardy after the match finished, and lifted Hardy up onto his shoulders and then dropped to a seated position, a move which Abyss dubbed the Shock Treatment.

=== Main event matches ===
The sixth scheduled bout was a Three Way Elimination match between DDP, Kevin Nash, and Monty Brown. The winner of this match would go on to challenge Jeff Jarrett for the NWA World Heavyweight Championship in the main event. DDP eliminated Nash by performing a dropkick, which caused Nash to fall over the top rope and down to the floor. With Nash eliminated, it was down to Brown and DDP. After the two fought back and forth for a few minutes, Brown threw DDP against the ropes while he ran against the opposite ropes and performed a running shoulder block in the center of the ring to complete a move he named the Pounce.

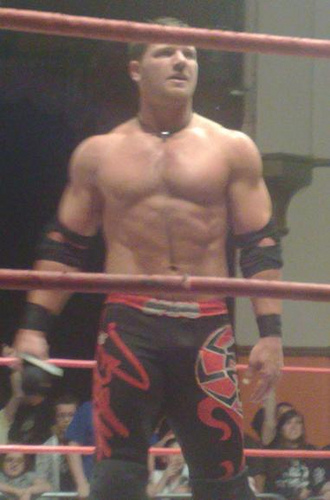
A.J. Styles defeated Petey Williams and Chris Sabin in an Ultimate X match at Final Resolution to win the TNA X Division Championship.

America's Most Wanted (Chris Harris and James Storm) challenged Team Canada (Bobby Roode and Eric Young), who were accompanied by Coach D'Amore, for the NWA World Tag Team Championship in the seventh match. Johnny Devine interfered midway through by hitting Storm with a kendo stick, which led to a pinfall attempt by Young, however Stormed kicked out at two. Later, Young went to grab a chair from Devine who had his back turned to the ring. This caused Devine to panic and hit Young in the head with the chair. Storm immediately followed by grabbing Young and pinning his shoulders to the mat with a schoolboy-type pin attempt for the victory.

The TNA X Division Championship was defended in an Ultimate X match, which involved A.J. Styles, Chris Sabin, and the champion, Petey Williams, who was accompanied by Coach D'Amore. D'Amore was banned from ringside in the opening minutes of the contest. Styles at one point was climbing across the cables to retrieve the championship, when Sabin springboarded off the far top rope and performed a dropkick in mid-air to Styles. This caused Styles to perform a front-flip in mid-air and land on his back in the center of the ring. The finish of the match saw Williams and Sabin both hanging on the ropes, each holding one end of the belt. Styles then springboarded off the far top rope and grabbed the belt in mid-flight. After he landed on the mat, he was declared the official winner.

Jeff Jarrett defended the NWA World Heavyweight Championship against Monty Brown in the main event. Near the closing minutes, Brown grabbed a guitar, which Jarrett had tried to use earlier, and bashed Jarrett over the head with it. Jarrett retained the championship in the bout after performed a maneuver he named the Stroke three times by grabbing Brown's head, and tucking his leg between Brown's two. He follows by extending Brown's near arm and tripping him to force his face into the mat. Jarrett then pinned Brown to end the match.

== Aftermath ==
After Final Resolution, Jeff Jarrett went on to be challenged by Kevin Nash for the NWA World Heavyweight Championship at Against All Odds. Their match was announced on the episode of Impact! that followed Final Resolution. At Against All Odds, Jarrett defeated Nash to retain the championship.

Newly crowned TNA X Division Champion, A.J. Styles, went on to defend his championship against Christopher Daniels in a 30-minute Iron Man match at Against All Odds. Styles had to defend the championship against Daniels at the event as per a pre-match stipulation to their bout on the January 21 episode of Impact!, in which if Styles failed to defeat Daniels in under 10 minutes, then he would have to give Daniels a title shot. Styles failed to win the contest in under ten minutes, which granted Daniels a title match. Dusty Rhodes then made the match a 30-minute Iron Man match. Styles went on to defeat Daniels at Against All Odds 2 to 1 in falls during over-time.

America's Most Wanted (Chris Harris and James Storm) (AMW) went on to Against All Odds to defend their newly won NWA World Tag Team Championship against Kid Kash and Lance Hoyt. This feud was built on a challenge made by Kash and Hoyt directed towards AMW on the January 21 episode of Impact! to defend their championship at Against All Odds against them, which AMW accepted. At the event, AMW retained the championship.

== Reception ==
The Canadian Online Explorer's writer Jason Clevett rated the entire event an 8 out of 10, which was higher than the 2006 event's rating of 6.5 out of 10. The NWA World Tag Team Championship bout was rated a 9 out of 10. The Ultimate X match for the TNA X Division Championship was rated a 10 out of 10. The Three Way Elimination match for a chance to challenge Jeff Jarrett for the NWA World Heavyweight Championship was rated a 5 out of 10, while main event was rated a 6 out of 10. Clevett stated in his review that he felt "the crowd went home happy after the stellar Ultimate X bout". When commenting on the NWA World Tag Team Championship match he stated it was "an awesome, awesome tag team match with insane crowd heat". He thought the main event was a "decent match that was marred once again by an abundance of overbooking B.S. that seems to plague the main event scene of TNA." The event was released on DVD on November 15, 2005 by TNA Home Video.

== Results ==
No.	Results	Stipulations	Times
1^{P}	The Naturals (Andy Douglas and Chase Stevens) defeated Johnny B. Badd and Sonny Siaki	Tag team match	—
2^{P}	Chris Candido defeated Cassidy Riley	Singles match	—
3	3 Live Kru (Ron Killings, Konnan and B.G. James) defeated Christopher Daniels, Michael Shane and Kazarian	Six-man tag team match	8:21
4	Elix Skipper defeated Sonjay Dutt	Singles match	10:12
5	Dustin Rhodes defeated Kid Kash	Singles match	10:50
6	Erik Watts defeated Raven	Singles match	10:19
7	Jeff Hardy defeated Scott Hall	Singles match with Roddy Piper as special guest referee	5:42
8	Monty Brown defeated Diamond Dallas Page and Kevin Nash	Triple threat elimination match to face Jeff Jarrett on the same night	9:40
9	America's Most Wanted (Chris Harris and James Storm) defeated Team Canada (c) (Bobby Roode and Eric Young) (with Coach D'Amore)	Tag team match for the NWA World Tag Team Championship	19:12
10	A.J. Styles defeated Petey Williams (c) (with Coach D'Amore) and Chris Sabin	Ultimate X match for the TNA X Division Championship	19:55
11	Jeff Jarrett (c) defeated Monty Brown	Singles match for the NWA World Heavyweight Championship	16:17
(c) / – the champion(s) heading into the match; P / – the match was broadcast on the pre-show

=== Three-way elimination match ===
Elimination	Wrestler	Eliminated by	Elimination move	Time
1	Kevin Nash	Diamond Dallas Page	Knock over the top rope after a dropkick by Page	
2	Diamond Dallas Page	Monty Brown	Pinned after a Pounce	9:40
Winner:	Monty Brown			
