= World's Most Wanted =

World's Most Wanted may refer to:

- "World's Most Wanted" (The Invincible Iron Man), a comic book arc of The Invincible Iron Man
- World's Most Wanted (TV series), a 2020 English-language French docuseries
- Lupin III: World's Most Wanted, the American version of the manga Lupin the 3rd Part II

== See also ==
- Most Wanted (disambiguation)
