= Most Wanted =

Most Wanted may refer to:

== Law enforcement ==
A most wanted list used by a law enforcement agency to alert the public, such as:

- EU Most Wanted
- FBI Most Wanted Terrorists
- FBI Ten Most Wanted Fugitives
- ICE Most Wanted
- List of Mexico's 37 most-wanted drug lords
- List of most wanted fugitives in Italy
- List of most wanted Nazi war criminals, Simon Wiesenthal Center
- NIA Most Wanted, India's National Investigation Agency
- Saudi list of most wanted suspected terrorists
- U.S. list of most-wanted Iraqis
- Most Wanted, successor to UK NCA Operation Captura in Spain
- Interpol notice, also known as a Red Notice

== Media ==
=== Film ===
- Most Wanted (1997 film), US
- Most Wanted (2011 film), Indian Odia-language film
- Most Wanted (2020 film), Canada
- India's Most Wanted (film), 2019 Indian film

=== Music ===
- Most Wanted (Hilary Duff album)
- Most Wanted (Kane & Abel album)
- Most Wanted (MOK album)
- Most Wanted: The Greatest Hits, an album by the Wanted
- Most Wanted, a mixtape by SpotemGottem
- "The Most Wanted Person in the United States", from the album 10,000 Gecs

=== Television ===
- FBI: Most Wanted, 2020
  - "Most Wanted" (FBI), pilot
- MTV's Most Wanted, 1992
- Most Wanted (1976 TV series), 1976–77
- "Most Wanted" (Beavis and Butt-Head), an episode
- Marvel's Most Wanted, a TV pilot
- India's Most Wanted, 1999 Indian crime television series

=== Video games ===
- Need for Speed: Most Wanted (2005 video game), a racing game
- Need for Speed: Most Wanted (2012 video game), a racing game

== See also ==
- America's Most Wanted (disambiguation)
