= Triple X (professional wrestling) =

Professional wrestling stable

Statistics
- Members: Christopher Daniels / Daniels; Low Ki / Senshi; Elix Skipper
- Name(s): Triple X xXx
- Debut: December 18, 2002
- Years active: 2002–2004; 2007–2008

Triple X was a wrestling stable in Total Nonstop Action Wrestling. The team consisted of Christopher Daniels, Elix Skipper and Low Ki (later known as Senshi). The team was originally formed in late 2002 as part of Vince Russo's Sports Entertainment Xtreme superstable. Daniels, the leader of this group, was a part of it during all of its runs until November 11, 2007.

== History ==
=== First Run (2002–2003) ===
Triple X began as a team under Vince Russo's "Sports Entertainment Xtreme" faction. They began teaming on December 18, 2002, defeating the team of Amazing Red and The S.A.T. One of the unique trends begun by Triple X was the "Triple X Rule" (which is precedented by the earlier Freebird Rule). When Low Ki and Elix Skipper won the NWA World Tag Team Championship on January 22, 2003, from America's Most Wanted (Chris Harris and James Storm), TNA officials permitted them to allow Christopher Daniels to defend the title as well. Before each tag team match, all three members of Triple X would stand in the ring, and only when the bell rang would it be known which two of the three would be competing.

They made the first title defense on February 5 PPV against Disciples of the New Church (Brian Lee and Slash) which ended in a double pin. As a result of this double pin, they were stripped of the titles. On the March 12 PPV, they defeated America's Most Wanted to begin their second NWA World Tag Team Championship reign. They began feuding with both Disciples of the New Church and America's Most Wanted over the titles. However, they lost the titles to Jerry Lynn and The Amazing Red on April 16.

On May 7, Christopher Daniels became the first ever solo holder of the NWA World Tag Team Championship. He won a handicap match with then-champions Amazing Red and Jerry Lynn by disqualification (at the time in TNA, championships could change hands by countout or DQ). They used their "Triple X Rule" to allow Elix Skipper to defend with him. During this time, Triple X began their now-legendary feud against America's Most Wanted, becoming the only team in TNA history to maintain regular success against the most dominant tag team in TNA history. This included the first cage match in TNA history, in which America's Most Wanted finally scored a win against Triple X for the NWA World Tag Team Championship on June 25.

After Low Ki left TNA in July 2003, Triple X parted ways the next month and both Daniels and Skipper focused on singles careers. However, they had a short lived reunion in January 2004.

=== Second Run (2004) ===
In March, Daniels brought in Low Ki as a surprise partner for the vacant NWA World Tag Team Championship Tournament, in which they defeated The New Franchise (Michael Shane and Shane Douglas) and The Naturals (Andy Douglas and Chase Stevens) before losing the finals to Kid Kash and Dallas. Afterwards, Low Ki disappeared from TNA again.

On May 26, 2004, Daniels and Skipper were reunited as members of Team NWA for the World X Cup, which pitted teams from the NWA, Japan, Mexico and Canada against one another in a series of matches for points. With the assistance of Daniels' and Skipper's Triple X teamwork, Team NWA was successful at winning the 2004 World X Cup.

After helping Team NWA win the World X Cup, Daniels ended up injuring his shoulder in Japan. After returning a month later, Daniels and Skipper stayed together, this time officially reuniting as Triple X. They went after the NWA Tag Team belts once more, this time in a feud involving long-term enemies America's Most Wanted and The Naturals. In an ironic twist of fate, they would each win the belts separately with members of their sworn enemies, America's Most Wanted. Elix Skipper and Chris Harris won the titles from The Naturals on September 8, but were beaten by Daniels and James Storm on September 21 tapings of Impact!, who held them until losing to Team Canada's Bobby Roode and Eric Young on October 12.

After that loss, the feud restarted in earnest, leading to a Last Team Standing match at TNA's first three-hour monthly pay-per-view Victory Road 2004. AMW went on to win the match. The two teams met each other in a Six Sides of Steel match at Turning Point 2004, a rematch of an August 2003 steel cage encounter, where the losing team was forced to disband. In a match that saw Elix Skipper do the now-legendary cagewalk rana, AMW got the win when they handcuffed Daniels to a corner and put the Power-Plex—Triple X's own finisher—on Skipper. Due to the loss, Triple X was disbanded and Daniels and Skipper could not tag together again.

=== Aftermath ===
Following the split at the end of Turning Point, both Christopher Daniels and Elix Skipper pursued singles careers in TNA. Daniels achieved success early on, winning the TNA X Division Championship at Destination X 2005. His first pay per view title defense was against none other than his former partner, Skipper, whom he defeated at Lockdown 2005. Daniels' reign continued through Unbreakable, at which point he lost the belt to A.J. Styles. Daniels later regained the belt in an Ultimate X match at Destination X 2006 against Samoa Joe and Styles, but soon after he lost the belt to Joe. Daniels regained the TNA X Division Championship one more time in a three-way match against Styles and Chris Sabin, before losing it just weeks later to Sabin at Final Resolution 2007 in another three-way match which included Jerry Lynn.

Apart from a strong showing early, Skipper met with limited success, and was quickly recruited into Simon Diamond's The Diamonds in the Rough stable. From there, he proceeded to team with Diamond and David Young until the team was eventually phased out by TNA and Skipper was eventually released.

Low Ki returned to TNA in April 2006 at the Lockdown 2006 pay per view as a surprise competitor. His opponent was none other than his former teammate, Christopher Daniels, who was originally scheduled to face Jushin Thunder Liger before the latter was forced to pull out of the event. Ki, now utilizing the name "Senshi", which translates directly from Japanese to "Warrior," defeated Daniels before eventually going on to win the X Division championship just after Slammiversary 2006 in a three-way match against champion Samoa Joe and Sonjay Dutt. After Senshi lost the belt to Chris Sabin at Bound for Glory (2006), he faded into the background, participating in the Paparazzi Championship Series through the remainder of 2006 and early 2007. He went on to defeat Austin Starr at Final Resolution 2007.

=== Reunion / Third Run (2007) ===
At Victory Road 2007, Triple X officially reunited when Senshi and the returning Skipper helped Daniels win the Ultimate X match. It was explained on the July 19, 2007 edition of TNA Today that since Skipper had been released and then re-signed by TNA to a new contract, that the stipulation of he and Daniels never teaming again was null and void (since that was under the old contract). They won their return match against Serotonin on the July 19 episode of Impact!. They followed their victory up on the August 2 episode of Impact!, where Daniels and Senshi defeated "Black Machismo" Jay Lethal and Sonjay Dutt with the help of Elix Skipper. After the match, there was a brief confrontation between them and The Motor City Machine Guns (Chris Sabin and Alex Shelley). Daniels and Senshi teamed together at Hard Justice 2007 to take on Jay Lethal and Sonjay Dutt and The Motor City Machine Guns in a triple threat match where Daniels was rolled up by Lethal taking the loss. On the following episode of Impact! Daniels' X Division Title shot was put on the line against Lethal which he lost after Lethal pinned him with the Lethal Combination.

On September 13 edition of Impact!, Daniels would end up winning the bout over the champion Jay Lethal in a non-title match and being rewarded with a X Division Title match at Bound for Glory against Lethal. At Bound for Glory (2007), Daniels would lose the match against Lethal after a top rope Lethal Combination. On the same show Skipper and Senshi faced LAX in a number one contender's match for the TNA World Tag Team Titles in an Ultimate X match. They would also lose their match on the show as Hernandez would retrieve the X for LAX after a Border Toss of Skipper onto Senshi on the outside of the ring.

Christopher Daniels and Senshi were sent to New Japan Pro-Wrestling to represent TNA in a series of matches at Destruction '07. They were able to defeat Prince Devitt and Minoru in a tag team match. Senshi left TNA thus ending the tag team. Daniels was then kayfabe fired via the 'Feast or Fired' stipulation.

== Championships and accomplishments ==
- Total Nonstop Action Wrestling
  - NWA World Tag Team Championship (3 times)
  - Feast or Fired (2007 – Pink Slip)^{1} – Senshi/Daniels
  - TNA Year End Award (1 time)
    - Match of the Year (2004) Daniels and Skipper vs. America's Most Wanted (Chris Harris and James Storm) at Turning Point

Notes

^{1}On the December 6, 2007 Impact!, Christopher Daniels defeated Senshi with Elix Skipper as Special Guest Referee to win his briefcase
