= NWA Shockwave Tag Team Championship =

Professional wrestling tag team championship

Details
- Promotion: NWA Shockwave
- Date established: October 29, 2002
- Date retired: 2006

Other names
- CSWF Tag Team Championship; NWA: Cyberspace Tag Team Championship
Statistics
- First champion: The Equalizers
- Final champions: The S.A.T. (won March 26, 2006)
- Most reigns: N/A
- Longest reign: The United Nations (349 days)
- Shortest reign: Julio Dinero and C.M. Punk (35 days)

The NWA Shockwave Tag Team Championship was a professional wrestling tag team championship in NWA Shockwave (NWA-SW) and the National Wrestling Alliance (NWA). It was the original title of the CyberSpace Wrestling Federation promotion and was later recognized by the NWA as a regional title. It was introduced as the CSWF Tag Team Championship on October 19, 2002. It was established as an NWA heavyweight championship in 2005 following the promotion's admission into the NWA. The promotion became NWA: Cyberspace, and later NWA Shockwave, with the title remaining active until its retirement in 2006.

The inaugural champions were The Equalizers (Aaron Morrison and Antonio Thomas), who defeated The Soul Brothers (Elvin and Jack Soul) and The Hardcore Mafia (Bruno and Joey Davino) in a three-way match on October 19, 2002, to become the first CSWF Tag Team Champions. There were 10 officially recognized champions, however no team held the belt more than once. Several then current tag teams from Total Non-Stop Action held the title during its 5-year history America's Most Wanted (Chris Harris and James Storm), The United Nations (Prince Nana and Sonjay Dutt) and The S.A.T. (Jose and Joel Maximo). At 350 days, The United Nations were the longest reigning champions in the title's history.

== Title history ==
#	Order in reign history
Reign	The reign number for the specific set of wrestlers listed
Event	The event in which the title was won
—	Used for vacated reigns so as not to count it as an official reign
N/A	The information is not available or is unknown
+	Indicates the current reign is changing daily

=== Names ===
Name	Years
CSWF Tag Team Championship	2002 — 2005
NWA: Cyberspace Tag Team Championship	2005 — 2006
NWA Tag Team Championship	2006

=== Reigns ===
Key
No.	Overall reign number
Reign	Reign number for the specific team—reign numbers for the individuals are in parentheses, if different
Days	Number of days held
+	Current reign is changing daily

No.	Champion	Championship change			Reign statistics		Notes	Ref.
No.	Champion	Date	Event	Location	Reign	Days	Notes	Ref.
1	The Equalizers (Aaron Morrison and Antonio Thomas)	October 19, 2002	Halloween Horror (2002)	Flemington, New Jersey	1	266	Defeated The Soul Brothers and The Hardcore Mafia in a three-way match to become the first CSWF Tag Team Champions.	
—	Vacated	July 12, 2003	Summerbash (2003)	Rahway, New Jersey	—	—	The championship was vacated when Aaron Morrison was sidelined due to injury.	
2	The United Nations (Prince Nana and Sonjay Dutt)	July 12, 2003	Summerbash (2003)	Rahway, New Jersey	1	350	Defeated The Dirty Rotten Scoundrelz to win vacant titles.	
3	America's Most Wanted (Chris Harris and James Storm)	June 26, 2004	Independent's Day (2004)	Wayne, New Jersey	1	224	Won a Tag Team Turmoil Tournament that also included The United Nations, Fire and Smoke, The Solution, The Youngbludz, Geneisis and Creed and The Hymalaya Playaz. On January 8, 2005, the title was renamed the NWA: Cyberspace Tag Team Championship when the promotion joins the National Wrestling Alliance.	
4	The Solution (Papadon and Havok)	February 5, 2005	SuperBrawl Saturday III (2005)	Wayne, New Jersey	1	105		
5	Julio Dinero and C.M. Punk	May 21, 2005	Live event	Wayne, New Jersey	1	35		
6	All Money is Legal (Kayotic Kid and Luda Kash)	June 25, 2005	No Gimmicks Needed (2005)	Wayne, New Jersey	1	274	Defeated Julio Dinero and Mo Sexy who was substituting for CM Punk.	
7	The S.A.T. (Jose Maximo and Joel Maximo)	March 26, 2006	Disturbing the Peace (2006)	Dover, New Jersey	1	250	This was a Tables, Ladders, and Chairs match also involving Grim Reefer and Archadia.	
—	Deactivated	December 1, 2006	N/A	N/A	—	—	The titles were retired when the promotion returns from a six-month hiatus following the death of founder Billy Firehawk.	

== Combined reigns ==
=== By team ===
Rank	Team	No. of reigns	Combined days
1	The United Nations (Prince Nana and Sonjay Dutt)	1	350
2	All Money is Legal (Kayotic Kid and Luda Kash)	1	274
3	The Equalizers (Aaron Morrison and Antonio Thomas)	1	266
4	America's Most Wanted (Chris Harris and James Storm)	1	224
5	The S.A.T. (Jose Maximo and Joel Maximo)	1	220
6	The Solution (Papadon and Havok)	1	105
7	Julio Dinero and C.M. Punk	1	35

=== By wrestler ===
Rank	Wrestler	No. of reigns	Combined days
1	Prince Nana	1	350
1	Sonjay Dutt	1	350
3	Kayotic Kid	1	274
3	Luda Kash	1	274
5	Aaron Morrison	1	266
5	Antonio Thomas	1	266
7	Chris Harris	1	224
7	James Storm	1	224
9	Jose Maximo	1	220
9	Joel Maximo	1	220
11	Papadon	1	105
11	Havok	1	105
13	Julio Dinero	1	35
13	C.M. Punk	1	35

== See also ==
- List of National Wrestling Alliance championships
