= TNA Turning Point (2004) =

2004 Total Nonstop Action Wrestling pay-per-view event

Turning Point (2004)
- Promotional poster featuring Monty Brown
- Promotion: Total Nonstop Action Wrestling
- Date: December 5, 2004
- City: Orlando, Florida
- Venue: TNA Impact! Zone
- Attendance: 700
- Tagline: "Destiny Awaits!"

Pay-per-view chronology
← Previous; Victory Road	Next → Final Resolution

Turning Point chronology
← Previous; First	Next → 2005

The 2004 Turning Point was a professional wrestling pay-per-view (PPV) event produced by Total Nonstop Action Wrestling (TNA), which took place on December 5, 2004, at the TNA Impact! Zone in Orlando, Florida. It was the first event under the Turning Point chronology. Eight matches were featured on the event's card.

The main event was a Six Sides of Steel cage match with a pre-match stipulation that the losing team would disband. America's Most Wanted (Chris Harris and James Storm) defeated Triple X (Christopher Daniels and Elix Skipper) in this match. A Six Man Tag Team match on the event's card ended in Jeff Hardy, A.J. Styles, and Randy Savage defeating The Kings of Wrestling (Jeff Jarrett, Kevin Nash and Scott Hall). The event's undercard featured different varieties of matches. Petey Williams defeated Chris Sabin to retain the TNA X Division Championship in one match on the undercard. Diamond Dallas Page defeated Raven in another match.

Turning Point is remembered for the disbanding of Triple X and for Elix Skipper pulling Chris Harris off the top of a cage with his legs to perform a move he named the New School. The PPV was also the final televised match of Randy Savage's career. The professional wrestling section of the Canadian Online Explorer website rated the event a 7 out of 10, which was the same as the 2005 event's rating.

== Production ==
=== Background ===
Turning Point featured eight professional wrestling matches involving wrestlers from pre-existing scripted feuds, plots, and storylines. Wrestlers were portrayed as either villains or heroes in scripted, tension-filled events that culminated in a wrestling match or series of matches.

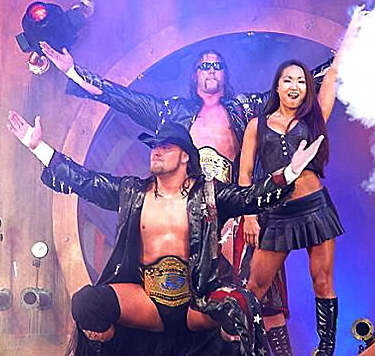
America's Most Wanted (Chris Harris and James Storm) fought Triple X (Christopher Daniels and Elix Skipper) in a Six Sides of Steel cage match.

The main event was contested inside a 16-foot (4.9 m) high steel structure with six sides—known as Six Sides of Steel; to win a wrestler must either gain a pinfall or submission, with the losing team disbanding. Participants in the main event included the tag team pairings of America's Most Wanted (Chris Harris and James Storm) and Triple X (Christopher Daniels and Elix Skipper). The storyline build to this match on September 8 at TNA's last weekly PPV event (#110). During this event, Harris replaced an injured Daniels and teamed with Skipper to defeat The Naturals (Andy Douglas and Chase Stevens) for the NWA World Tag Team Championship. Harris and Skipper then proceeded to lose the championship to Storm and Daniels on the September 24 episode of TNA's primary television program, TNA Impact!. After Storm and Daniels lost the championship to Team Canada (Bobby Roode and Eric Young) on the October 15 episode of Impact!, tensions between the teams during the respective title reigns gave way to an official rivalry between America's Most Wanted and Triple X. The teams fought against each other in an Elimination Last Team Standing match at TNA's previous and first monthly three-hour PPV event, Victory Road. In an Elimination Last Man Standing match, a series of events must take place to eliminate a participant. First, a wrestler must be pinned, and then the pinned wrestler has until the referee's count of ten to reach their feet before they are officially eliminated from the match. The first two members of a team to be eliminated lose the contest; America's Most Wanted was victorious in the Elimination Last Man Standing match at Victory Road. On the November 19 episode of Impact!, Daniels insinuated that the two teams were scheduled for a Six Sides of Steel cage match at Turning Point. Later in the episode, newly appointed authority figure Dusty Rhodes announced that the match was indeed scheduled, with the added stipulation that the losing team would have to disband and never team together again in TNA under any circumstances.

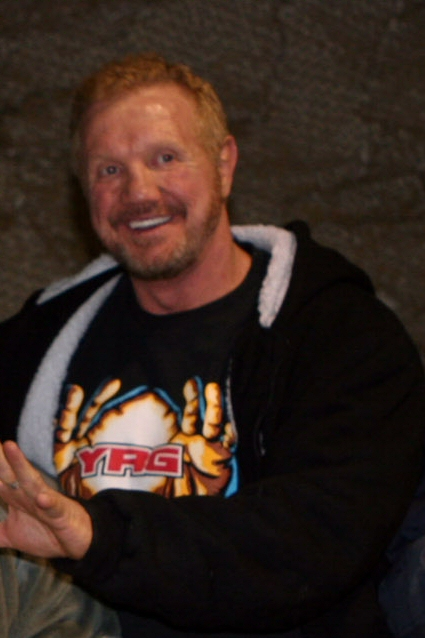
Diamond Dallas Page fought Raven at Turning Point.

A Six Man Tag Team match scheduled pitting the team of Jeff Hardy, A.J. Styles, and Randy Savage against The Kings of Wrestling (Jeff Jarrett, Kevin Nash, and Scott Hall) was another highly promoted match. At Victory Road during the main event for the NWA World Heavyweight Championship between Jarrett and Hardy, Nash and Hall interfered and cost Hardy the match. Afterwards, Nash, Hall, and Jarrett joined forces and dubbed themselves "The Kings of Wrestling"; they then proceeded to attack Hardy Following the encounter between Jarrett and Hardy, the 3 Live Kru (B.G. James, Ron Killings, and Konnan), and Styles came out to Hardy's aid. Nash, Hall, and Jarrett quickly won the fight. Savage then made his debut in TNA aligning himself with Styles and Hardy. After multiple fights between the two teams, Savage challenged The Kings of Wrestling to a match at Turning Point on the November 19 episode of Impact!. The match was later made official by TNA without The Kings of Wrestling agreeing to it.

A featured preliminary match on Turning Point's card was for the TNA X Division Championship, in which the champion, Petey Williams, defended the championship against Chris Sabin. The match was promoted for Turning Point on the November 12 episode of Impact!. In the weeks leading to the encounter, Sabin stated he had found a counter to Williams' finishing maneuver the Canadian Destroyer, which was thought to be uncounterable. The Canadian Destroyer involves Williams grabbing an opponent with his legs around their head, jumping over their back, causing them to perform a backflip, and forcing their head into the mat after they make the full rotation. Making true to his word, Sabin countered the move three times before Turning Point; one on the November 12, one of the November 19, and the last on the November 30 episodes of Impact!.

Another match announced for Turning Point was between Raven and Diamond Dallas Page. On the November 12 episode of Impact!, Page cost Raven a match against Monty Brown, creating a rivalry between the two. On the November 19 episode of Impact!, Page attacked Raven once again, costing him another match. TNA later scheduled a match between the two at Turning Point.

== Event ==
Other on-screen personnel
Commentators	Mike Tenay
Commentators	Don West
Ring announcer	Jeremy Borash
Referee	Rudy Charles
Referee	Mark "Slick" Johnson
Referee	Andrew Thomas
Interviewers	Jeremy Borash
Interviewers	Shane Douglas

=== Pre-Show ===
Before the event began, a thirty-minute pre-show aired with a match between The Naturals (Andy Douglas and Chase Stevens) and Mikey Batts and Jerrelle Clark. The Naturals won the match by pinfall, after Stevens and Douglas lifted Batts up, placed Batts head and neck onto one of their shoulders, and fell to a seated position to perform a move they dubbed the Natural Disaster.

=== Preliminary matches ===
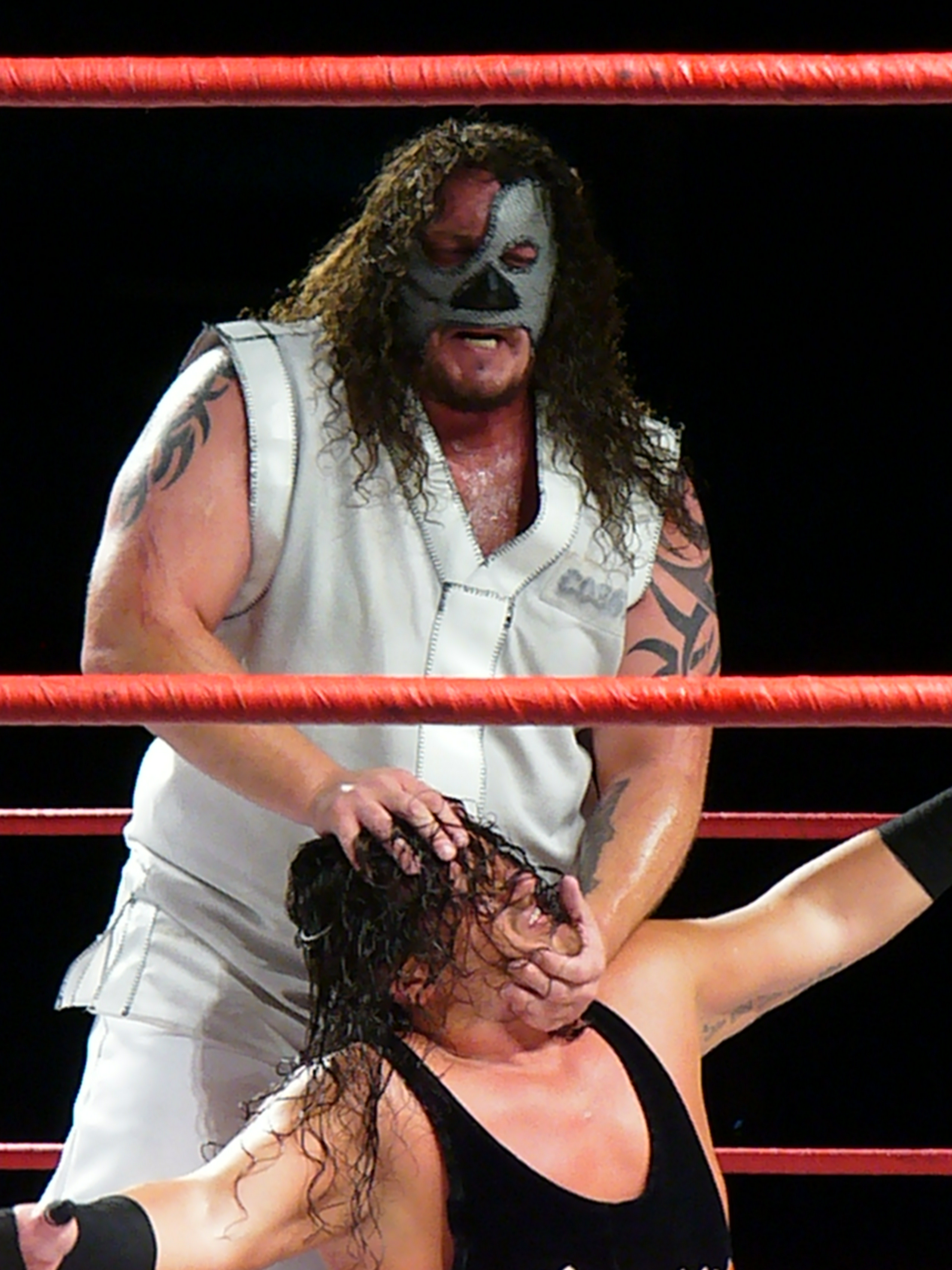
Abyss fought Monty Brown in a Serengeti Survival match at Turning Point.

In the first match, the 3Live Kru (B.G. James and Ron Killings) defended the NWA World Tag Team Championship against Team Canada (Bobby Roode and Eric Young), who were accompanied by Coach D'Amore. Team Canada won the match and the championship after another Team Canada member, Johnny Devine, interfered and hit B.G. with a hockey stick. Roode followed up by pinning B.G. to win the match.

The next encounter pitted the team of Héctor Garza, Sonjay Dutt, and Sonny Siaki were pitted against the team of Kid Kash, Michael Shane, and Frankie Kazarian, who were accompanied by Traci, in a Six Man Tag Team match. Garza, Dutt, and Siaki won the match after Garza jumped off the top rope backwards and twisted in mid-air to perform a corkscrew moonsault onto Kazarian for the pinfall victory.

The third match was a Serengeti Survival match between Monty Brown and Abyss. In this match, there were no disqualifications and the only way to win was by pinfall, submission, or by slamming the opponent into a pile of thumbtacks. Mid-way through the match, Brown grabbed a bag of tacks and poured them on the ring-mat. Afterwards, Brown and Abyss fought to slam each other into the tacks until Brown lifted Abyss up onto his shoulders and threw him forward down to the ring-mat. Brown's throw caused Abyss to fall on the tacks with his head and back, giving the win to Brown.

A tag team match followed in the fourth match, with Pat Kenney teaming with Johnny B. Badd to fight The New York Connection (Johnny Swinger and Glenn Gilbertti). Jacqueline was the special guest referee for the bout. Badd won the encounter after he lifted Gilberti up onto his shoulders, spun him around, and fell to his back to perform a move known as a TKO. Badd followed by covering Gilberti for the pinfall.

Diamond Dallas Page (DDP) and Raven fought in the fifth match. The officiating referee was scripted to be knocked out in the beginning of the match and was later replaced. DDP claimed victory in the match with the Diamond Cutter.

=== Main event matches ===
Accompanied by Coach D'Amore, Petey Williams defended the TNA X Division Championship against Chris Sabin. During the match, Sabin countered the Canadian Destroyer and attempted to perform his signature maneuver, the Cradle Shock. Williams countered the Cradle Shock into a Sharpshooter. While the referee wasn't looking, Williams hit Sabin with a pair of brass knuckles and gained the pinfall victory to end the match, retaining the TNA X Division Championship.

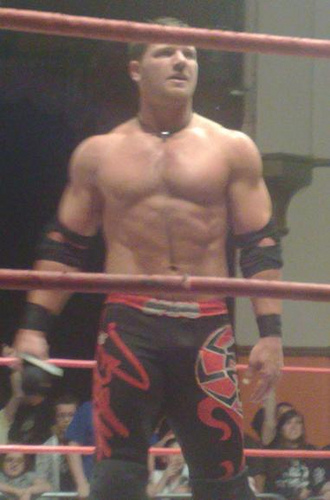
A.J. Styles teamed with Jeff Hardy and Randy Savage to fight The Kings of Wrestling (Jeff Jarrett, Kevin Nash and Scott Hall) at Turning Point in a Six Man Tag Team match.

Next, the Kings of Wrestling (Kevin Nash, Scott Hall, and Jeff Jarrett) fought the team of Jeff Hardy, A.J. Styles, and Randy Savage in a Six Man Tag Team match. Earlier in the night, The Kings of Wrestling attacked Savage and stuffed him into the trunk of a limo, which sped off out of the arena's parking lot. Without Savage, Styles and Hardy had to work the match by themselves. After several minutes of Hardy and Styles fighting off all the members of The Kings of Wrestling, Savage returned to the arena and walked down to the ring, where he was tagged into the match by Hardy. A few moments later, Savage pinned Jarrett after a punch to the jaw.

The main event was a Six Sides of Steel cage match contested between America's Most Wanted (Chris Harris and James Storm) and Triple X (Christopher Daniels and Elix Skipper), with the losing team disbanding forever. Mid-way through, Skipper handcuffed Harris to the ropes and kept the key away from the referee. Storm later took the key from Skipper and freed Harris from the cuffs. At one point in the match, Skipper and Daniels double teamed Harris and performed America's Most Wanted signature finishing maneuver, the Death Sentence by holding Harris in place while the other member climbed to the top rope and performed a leg drop across Harris's neck and head. Skipper followed by covering Harris for a pinfall, however, he kicked out before the count of three. Harris later climbed up to the top of the cage. While Harris sat on top of the cage, Skipper climbed up at another corner and walked across the top similar to walking a tightrope. Skipper then jumped and grabbed Harris's head with his legs, falling backwards towards the ring in a move he dubbed the New School. This move caused Harris to fly off of the top of the cage and land on his back in the middle of the ring. A brief time later, all four men were positioned at certain points on one of the padded turnbuckles to perform what TNA calls the "Tower of Doom". In a variation of the move, Daniels was being held upside-down by Storm, until Skipper grabbed Storm and placed his head between Storm's legs to lift him off of a padded turnbuckle. Harris then grabbed Skipper and placed Skipper on his shoulders while he held Storm, who remained holding Daniels. Harris then performed a powerbomb on Skipper, while Skipper pulled down Storm, who suplexed Daniels off of the top of the cage. The conclusion to the match saw America's Most Wanted cuff Daniels to the ropes and perform Triple X's signature maneuver, the Powerplex by lifting Skipper up onto Storm's shoulders while Harris held Skipper's head. Storm and Harris then fell to the mat, forcing Skipper's neck into Harris's shoulder and mat while slamming his back into the mat as well. Storm then pinned Skipper for the pinfall victory. As a result of Triple X's loss, the team had to disband forever.

== Aftermath ==
Following Turning Point, America's Most Wanted (Chris Harris and James Storm) began a rivalry with Team Canada (Bobby Roode and Eric Young) over the NWA World Tag Team Championship. They defeated Team Canada on the December 24 episode of Impact! to earn the chance to challenge them at TNA's next PPV, Final Resolution. At the event, America's Most Wanted defeated Team Canada to win the championship.

The rivalry between The Kings of Wrestling (Jeff Jarrett, Scott Hall, and Kevin Nash) and Randy Savage, Jeff Hardy, and A.J. Styles slowly died down after the event. Styles went on to Final Resolution to win the TNA X Division Championship in an Ultimate X match, which also involved Chris Sabin and Petey Williams. In an Ultimate X match, four pillars are set up at ringside with steel red ropes attached at the top, which are criss-crossed to form an "X" over the center of the ring. The championship belt is hung on the center "X" with the objective being to remove it and fall to the mat below to win. Hardy defeated Hall at Final Resolution as a replacement for Hector Garza. Savage left the company after the event. The Kings of Wrestling later disbanded (not official until after Final Resolution) as a result of Nash being placed in a match where the winner would challenge Jarrett in the main event of Final Resolution for the NWA World Heavyweight Championship; this match also took place at the event.

In 2007, Triple X reformed at Victory Road (which became a July PPV event in 2006) with all three members of the original alliance: Daniels, Skipper, and Senshi. Before the reunion in 2007, Daniels had a successful career as a singles competitor. At TNA's March PPV event, Destination X, Daniels won the TNA X Division Championship from Styles in an Ultimate X Challenge match involving Ron Killings and his former partner, Eilx Skipper. Afterward, Daniels went on to make successful defenses and winning the championship three times; Skipper's singles career was not as victorious.

== Reception ==
Writer Bob Kapur of the Canadian Online Explorer rated Turning Point a 7 out of 10, which was the same as the rating for the 2005 event. The TNA X Division Championship bout was rated an 8 out of 10. The Six Man Tag Team match between The Kings of Wrestling (Kevin Nash, Scott Hall, and Jeff Jarrett) and A.J. Styles, Jeff Hardy, and Randy Savage was rated a 3 out of 10, while the Six Sides of Steel cage match main event was rated a 9 out of 10. In his review, Kapur stated that he felt the Six Man Tag Team match was "an overbooked train wreck whose only saving grace was Styles's performance, as he tried to wring out something decent out of the old-timers". The X Division Championship and main event bouts gained better reviews from Kapur. According to Kapur, the X Division Championship encounter was "a fantastic match which really showcases the talents of both men." Regarding the main event, Kapur described it as "a fantastic match filled with exciting high spots from bell to bell". TNA released a list of their top 50 moments in their history in 2006 in a DVD release titled "TNA: The 50 Greatest Moments", with the main event between America's Most Wanted (Chris Harris and James Storm) and Triple X (Christopher Daniels and Elix Skipper) being ranked number 6. On September 20, 2005, TNA Home Video released the event in a DVD boxset called "TNA Anthology: The Epic Set", including TNA's April 2005 PPV event, Lockdown, and the 2004 Victory Road event.

== Results ==
No.	Results	Stipulations	Times
1	Team Canada (Eric Young and Bobby Roode) (with Coach D'Amore) defeated 3 Live Kru (B.G. James and Ron Killings) (c) (with Konnan)	Tag team match for the NWA World Tag Team Championship	8:30
2	Sonny Siaki, Héctor Garza and Sonjay Dutt defeated Kid Kash, Michael Shane and Kazarian (with Traci Brooks)	X Division Six-man tag team match	11:01
3	Monty Brown defeated Abyss	Serengeti Survival match	12:17
4	Pat Kenney and Johnny B. Badd defeated The New York Connection (Johnny Swinger and Glenn Gilbertti) (with Stephanie Trinity)	Tag team match with Jacqueline as special guest referee	7:50
5	Diamond Dallas Page defeated Raven	Singles match	12:03
6	Petey Williams (c) (with Coach D'Amore) defeated Chris Sabin	Singles match for the TNA X Division Championship	18:11
7	A.J. Styles, Jeff Hardy and Randy Savage defeated Jeff Jarrett, Kevin Nash and Scott Hall	Six-man tag team match	17:52
8	America's Most Wanted (Chris Harris and James Storm) defeated Triple X (Christopher Daniels and Elix Skipper)	Six Sides of Steel match The losing team was forced to disband.	21:01
(c) / – the champion(s) heading into the match
