= America's Most Wanted (group) =

American hip hop group

- Also known as: A.M.W.
- Origin: Oakland, California
- Genres: Hip hop
- Years active: 1990–1995
- Labels: Triad Records, Shot Records
- Members: Cheech Mack; Chucksta; Mellow-D; The Boss Man

Criminals

Studio album by America's Most Wanted
- Released: 1990
- Recorded: 1990
- Genre: Hip hop
- Label: Triad Records
- Producer: Eric Warren; The Boss Man

America's Most Wanted chronology
''Criminals'' (1990)	The Real Mobb (1995)

America's Most Wanted, also known as A.M.W., was an American hip hop group from Oakland, California, made up of Tyrell "The Boss Man" Brewer, Charles "Chucksta" Mack, Chris "Mellow-D" Wilson and "Cheech Mack" (Bradley Askew). They were signed to Triad Records and Shot Records.

They came together in 1990 to release their first album, Criminals, which peaked at number 66 on the Billboard Top R&B/Hip-Hop Albums chart. Five years later, by which time Mellow-D had left the group, Cheech Mack was added back into the group once released from jail. They released their second and final album, The Real Mobb, which failed to chart. In 1996, the group disbanded.

- Lil Big & The Boss Man are the same person. (Tyrell Brewer)

== Discography ==
Album information
Criminals
- Released: 1990
- Chart positions: #66 Top R&B/Hip-Hop
- Singles: "Armed & Dangerous", "Can You Step to This"
The Real Mobb
- Released: 1995
- Singles: "This Is the Mobb"
