= America's Most Wanted (professional wrestling) =

Professional wrestling tag team

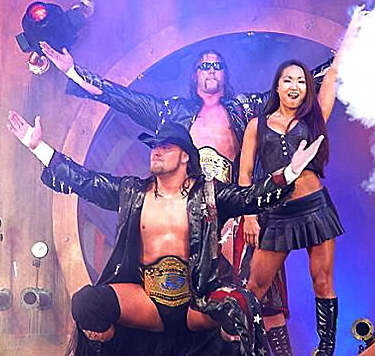
- America's Most Wanted – James Storm (front), Chris Harris (back), and Gail Kim (right) – at a TNA event

Tag team
- Members: Chris Harris; James Storm
- Name: America's Most Wanted
- Billed heights: Harris: 6 ft 3 in (1.91 m); Storm: 6 ft 0 in (1.83 m)
- Combined billed weight: 462 lb (210 kg)
- Former members: Gail Kim (manager)
- Debut: July 13, 2001
- Years active: 2001–2006; 2016; 2022–present

America's Most Wanted (shortened to AMW) is a professional wrestling tag team consisting of Chris Harris and James Storm, who competed in Total Nonstop Action Wrestling (TNA). They were managed in the later stage of their pairing by Gail Kim.

The team later became a more well-known tag team in TNA's history, credited with putting the TNA tag team division on the map, and engaging in many feuds with such teams as The Disciples of the New Church, The Naturals, Team Canada, 3Live Kru, Triple X, and Team 3D. Harris and Storm are six times NWA World Tag Team Champions together, a record for those championships as a team.

== History ==
=== Formation ===
Before the tag team was formed, James Storm and Chris Harris were occasional rivals on the independent circuit. They wrestled each other in the TNA tryout show, which later landed them the job at TNA. In the DVD The History of TNA: Year 1, Chris Harris remembers being backstage after the match, and TNA founder Jeff Jarrett winked at him and told him he would be in touch.

==== NWA World Tag Team Champions (2002–2005) ====
They were brought together at NWA:TNA PPV on June 26, 2002, when another tag team called The Dupps refused to fight the Rainbow Express (Lenny and Bruce). Storm and Harris won the match, and later teamed together.

On September 18, NWA:TNA PPV, AMW participated in a 20-man Gauntlet for the Gold match for the vacant NWA World Tag Team Championship. Chris Harris and Brian Lee were the finalists of this Gauntlet and then a tag team match began for the vacant titles as their partners Ron Harris and James Storm, respectively, joined them. AMW went on to win the match and their first NWA World Tag Team Championship. They began feuding with Lee and Slash as they defended their titles against other teams of the TNA. On the November 13 PPV, they dropped the titles to Lee and Slash. On January 8, 2003, they defeated the Disciples of The New Church and regained their titles.

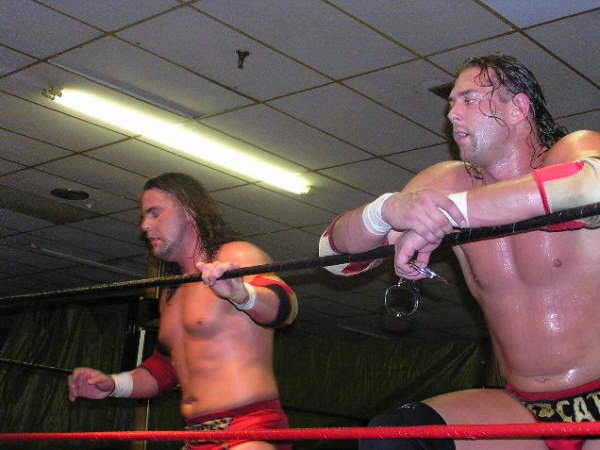
James Storm (left) and Chris Harris (right) at a house show

Two weeks later, they lost the titles to Triple X (Low Ki and Elix Skipper). On March 26, the problems started between AMW because Harris was doing a singles match. On April 9, it was rumored that Harris might join Sports Entertainment Xtreme (S.E.X.) because Harris was found in the S.E.X. locker room. The tensions continued as Storm walked out on Harris on April 23 during a match against Elix Skipper and Christopher Daniels. The duo faced each other in a singles match on May 7 which Storm won. After the match, Storm teased the breakup and then shook hands with Harris. Harris teamed up with Chris Sabin in the number one contenders' Anarchy Alliance tag team tournament with the winners getting a title shot at the NWA World Tag Team Championship. Harris and Sabin qualified in the first round, but in the second round, Harris' partner James Storm replaced Sabin and the duo won the second round match. After the match, Harris refused to join S.E.X. and reaffirmed his partnership with Storm. On June 11, AMW won the Anarchy Alliance tournament by defeating David Young and Tracy Brookshaw in the finals and won a title shot at the NWA World Tag Team Championship.

On June 25, they finally defeated Triple X in a steel cage match to win their third NWA World Tag Team Championship. This match gain attraction and rose the AMW to popularity. They then began feuding with the team of Simon and Swinger against whom they had two title defenses in a row. On the August 20 PPV, they lost a non-title match Bullrope match to Diamond and Swinger which earned the duo a tag title match. The next week, AMW dropped the titles to Diamond and Swinger.

In early 2004, they feuded with Red Shirt Security (Kevin Northcutt and Legend) after AMW defeated New York Connection (Glen Gilberti and David Young). On the January 21 PPV, they lost to Red Shirt Security in a number one contender's tag team match. On June 4 edition of Impact!, AMW defeated Kid Kash and Dallas to win their fourth NWA World Tag Team Championship. They defended the titles against many teams during their fourth reign before losing the titles to The Naturals (Chase Stevens and Andy Douglas) on July 7 PPV in 12 seconds. Two weeks later, they faced Naturals in a Six Sides of Steel match for the titles but lost the match.

They began feuding with Naturals while they also feuded with Triple X. On September 1, Naturals defeated Triple X and AMW in a triple threat tag team match to retain the tag titles. The next week, Storm wasn't cleared to wrestle while Christopher Daniels was injured, so AMW's Harris teamed up with Triple X's Elix Skipper to win the NWA World Tag Team Championship from Naturals. On September 24 edition of Impact!, Storm teamed up with Daniels to win the NWA World Tag Team Championship. They ended up losing the titles to Team Canada (Bobby Roode and Eric Young) on October 15 edition of Impact!. AMW entered a feud with Triple X. They defeated them in an Elimination Last Man Standing match at Victory Road 2004. After that, they agreed to a Six Sides of Steel match at Turning Point 2004 where the losing team would separate. AMW won the match, ending Triple X and winning the following feud.

At Final Resolution 2005, they defeated Team Canada to win their fifth NWA World Tag Team Championship. They lost the titles to The Naturals on April 29, 2005 edition of Impact!. At Hard Justice 2005, they lost to the Naturals in a rematch for the titles. At Unbreakable, AMW took part in a fatal four-way tag team elimination match challenging The Naturals for the tag team titles, which also involved Team Canada and the team of Johnny Candido and Alex Shelley.

On September 15, 2005, AMW turned heel by siding with Jeff Jarrett and Team Canada, helping Jarrett win the NWA World Heavyweight Championship from Raven in Canada. The team then served as enforcers and backup for Jeff Jarrett and Gail Kim. At Bound for Glory, they managed to retain their titles against The Naturals. They also began a rivalry with Team 3D (Brother Ray and Brother Devon), beating them and leaving them defeated in the ring when they debuted and staging a mock funeral for their careers afterwards. At Genesis 2005, Jarrett and AMW lost to Team 3D and Rhino. At Turning Point 2005, they lost to Team 3D in a Tables match. After Team 3D defeated AMW in non-title matches, they got a title shot at Final Resolution 2006, which AMW won and retained their titles.

AMW's sixth and final reign as the NWA Tag Team Champions was also the longest reign in the belt's history since its revived inception in 1998. They became the longest-reigning NWA World Tag Team Champions in TNA history on March 29, 2006, surpassing The Naturals reign of 24 weeks. In the summer of 2006, they feuded with A.J. Styles and Christopher Daniels. They defended the titles against Styles and Daniels at Sacrifice 2006, before dropping the titles to them at Slammiversary 2006. After losing the belts they once again turned into fan favorites and started feuding with the Latin American Xchange (Homicide and Hernandez) in the fall of the year. At Genesis 2006, they challenged LAX for the NWA Tag Team Championship.

==== Split and feud (2006–2007) ====
At Turning Point 2006, AMW lost a flag match to LAX. When Storm hit Homicide with a beer bottle, glass flew into the eyes of Harris. Storm blamed the loss on Harris. AMW got a re-match on the December 14, 2006 edition of Impact! in a "Titles vs. Team" match with the stipulation that AMW would have to split up if they lost. They lost after Storm deliberately hit Harris with a beer bottle.

On the January 11, 2007 episode of Impact! Harris did a (kayfabe) sit-down interview with Mike Tenay stating his concerns over his wrestling career. Harris was not seen on television until the Against All Odds pay-per-view in which he (wearing an eye patch) went for Storm. For several weeks, he continued to attack Storm. On the March 1, 2007 episode of Impact! Harris claimed his vision was at 30% and vowed revenge on Storm. At Lockdown, Harris lost to Storm in Six Sides of Steel match, in which both men were blindfolded. It was revealed his vision had been restored, and Harris faced off against Storm at Sacrifice, in a Texas Death match, where Harris won.

==== Aftermath ====
Afterwards, Kim left and was replaced by Jackie Moore as Storm's manager. Storm officially turned heel and would later begin teaming with former Team Canada member Robert Roode to form "Beer Money, Inc." with Jackie Moore as their manager and winning the TNA World Tag Team Championship together four times. Harris ended up departing TNA and joined rival promotion World Wrestling Entertainment, wrestling on its ECW brand under the name Braden Walker before being released from his WWE contract only two weeks later. Kim went on to headline TNA's Women's Division by becoming the inaugural TNA Knockouts Champion before parting ways with TNA. Since then, Harris has been wrestling on the independent circuit while Gail Kim returned to WWE for a time before rejoining TNA's Women's Division.

On May 12, 2011, Harris returned to TNA as a member of the heel group Immortal and tag team partner of Matt Hardy, challenging Beer Money, Inc. for the TNA World Tag Team Championship, but was pinned after receiving AMW's signature move, the Death Sentence. On October 20, 2011, James Storm defeated Kurt Angle to win the TNA World Heavyweight Championship for the first time.

On the March 30, 2021 episode of Impact, Chris Harris made his second return to TNA, now known as Impact Wrestling, appearing ringside for James Storm's 1000th match in the company and aiding him in defeating Eric Young.

== Championships ==
- Atomic Legacy Wrestling
  - ALW Tag Team Championship (1 time, current)
- NWA Shockwave
  - NWA Cyberspace Tag Team Championship (1 time)
- Pro Wrestling Illustrated
  - PWI Tag Team of the Year (2004)
- Total Nonstop Action Wrestling
  - NWA World Tag Team Championship (6 times)
  - Gauntlet for the Gold (2002 – Tag Team)
  - TNA Anarchy Alliance Tag Team Tournament (2003)
  - TNA Year End Awards (3 times)
    - Match of the Year (2004) vs. Triple X (Christopher Daniels and Elix Skipper) at Turning Point
    - Tag Team of the Year (2003–2004)
- World Wrestling Council
  - WWC World Tag Team Championship (1 time)
- Wrestling Observer Newsletter awards
  - Tag Team of the Year (2005)
