= United States Secret Service Most Wanted Fugitives =

List of people compiled by the United States Secret Service

The United States Secret Service Most Wanted Fugitives is a list compiled by the agency of the most wanted fugitives, with a focus on those wanted for fraud and identity theft.
