= James Storm =

American professional wrestler (born 1977)

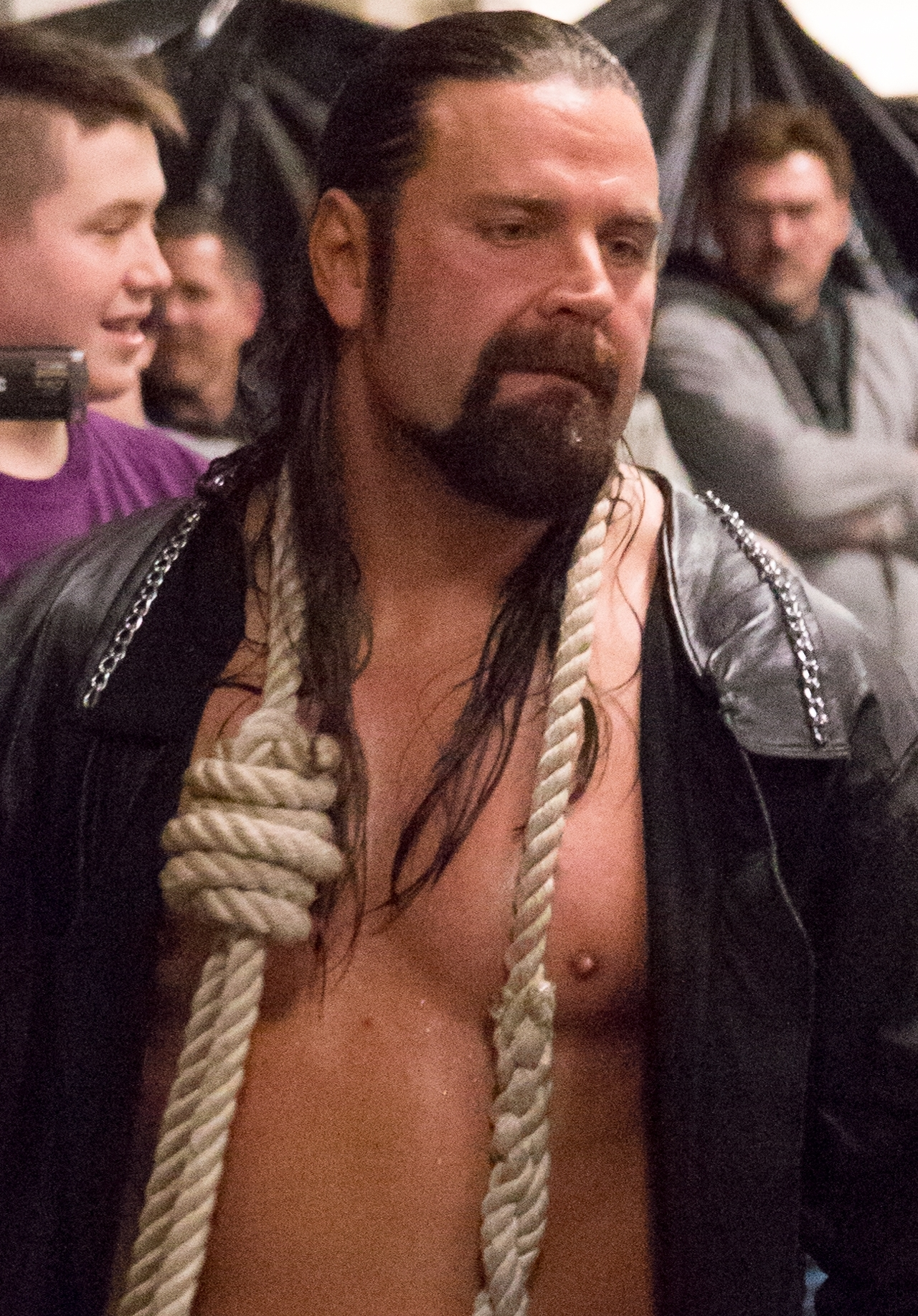
- Storm in 2015

Personal information
- Born: James Allen Cox; June 1, 1977 (age 49) Franklin, Tennessee, U.S.
- Spouse: Dani McEntee (m. 2011)
- Children: 3
- Website: sorryaboutyourdamnluck.com

Professional wrestling career
- Ring name: James Storm
- Billed height: 6 ft 0 in (183 cm)
- Billed weight: 230 lb (104 kg)
- Billed from: Leipers Fork, Tennessee, U.S.
- Trained by: Jerry Jarrett; Shane Morton; Wolfie D James Roberts
- Debut: 1997

James Allen Cox (born June 1, 1977) is an American professional wrestler better known by the ring name James Storm. He currently works on the independent circuit and Juggalo Championship Wrestling (JCW). He is best known for his time in Total Nonstop Action Wrestling (TNA) and the National Wrestling Alliance (NWA).

He started his career in 1997 and after working on several independent promotions, he began to wrestle for the newly created NWA: Total Nonstop Action promotion. Storm participated in TNA's first event and became a tag team with Chris Harris, America's Most Wanted (AMW). AMW became one of the best tag teams in the promotion, winning 6 times the NWA World Tag Team Championship. He also won the NWA World Tag Team Championship one more time with Christopher Daniels. After the team disbanded in 2006, Storm started a singles career, crowning himself as the TNA World Beer Drinking Champion.

In 2008, Storm formed Beer Money, Inc. with Bobby Roode. Together they became 4 time TNA World Tag Team Champions and joined the Fortune stable. In 2011, Storm defeated Kurt Angle to win the TNA World Heavyweight Championship, his first world title. During the following years, Storm won the TNA World Tag Team Championship two more times with Gunner in 2013 and Abyss in 2014, as well as the TNA King of the Mountain Championship once. He would leave TNA in 2015. Storm returned in 2016, winning the TNA World Tag Team Championship one more time with Bobby Roode as Beer Money. After leaving TNA in 2018, Storm worked for several independent promotions, most notably National Wrestling Alliance (NWA), where he won the NWA World Tag Team Championship once (with Eli Drake), and NWA National Championship once.

== Early life ==
James Allen Cox was an amateur wrestler while in high school. In addition, he was a talented basketball player, and was awarded a scholarship to Austin Peay State University.

== Professional wrestling career ==
=== Early career (1997–2002) ===
Cox's professional wrestling career began when he was trained by Wolfie D, a veteran tag team wrestler, in 1995. His training was hampered by a broken shoulder, and Cox eventually dropped out of Slash's training school. He resumed training with Shane Morton after his shoulder had healed.

Cox toured the south-east independent circuit before being signed to a World Championship Wrestling (WCW) developmental deal in 2000. Cox made several appearances for World Championship Wrestling on WCW Worldwide and WCW Saturday Night in 2000 as an enhancement talent, where he assumed the ring name "James Storm".

Storm returned to the independent circuit after WCW was sold to the World Wrestling Federation in March 2001.

=== NWA Total Nonstop Action / Total Nonstop Action Wrestling (2002–2015) ===
==== America's Most Wanted (2002–2006) ====
Storm wrestled his future tag team partner, Chris Harris, on a "Legends Night" show on June 1, 2002. As a result of the match, both wrestlers were hired by the upstart Total Nonstop Action Wrestling (TNA) promotion. The pair were expected to wrestle as singles wrestlers, but were instead placed into a tag team. They named themselves "America's Most Wanted" (AMW) because, according to Storm the name was a reference to his "little trouble with the law".

On the inaugural TNA pay-per-view on June 19, 2002, Storm and Harris were in two different matches in their TNA debuts (Storm teamed up with Psicosis against The Johnsons, while Harris took part in the Gauntlet for the Gold battle royal for the vacant NWA World Heavyweight Championship). The pair wrestled together for the first time on the second ever TNA pay-per-view a week later. Storm and Harris quickly became mainstays of the promotion and teamed regularly over the next few years. Splits were teased in early 2003 and again in 2004, but nothing came of them.

America's Most Wanted turned heel in late 2005 by helping Jeff Jarrett defeat Raven for the NWA World Heavyweight Championship. They went on to join Jarrett's Army, acquiring the managerial skills of Gail Kim in the process. At Bound for Glory, AMW successfully retained their titles against The Naturals. Storm's penchant for wearing cowboy hats resulted in the team often being jeered as "Brokeback Mountain", a reference to the movie about homosexual cowboys, during their heel run. In mid-2006, they again teased their split due to miscommunication during their matches, most notably when Harris accidentally hit Storm with a garbage can during a No Disqualification match against Team 3D (Brother Ray and Brother Devon). During their run as a team, the duo won the NWA World Tag Team Championship six times.

On the December 14, 2006 episode of Impact!, America's Most Wanted came to an end after a feud-ending match with The Latin American Xchange (Homicide and Hernandez) when Storm hit Harris with a beer bottle, temporarily "blinding" Harris's right eye. Storm went on to feud with Petey Williams before turning on Gail Kim and aligning himself with the returning Jacqueline Moore. He then went on a huge winning streak, coming out victorious in matches against Petey Williams, Eric Young, and former partner Chris Harris in his return match, among several others. At the Sacrifice pay-per view, Storm was defeated by Harris in a Texas Death Match, which ended his long-running winning streak. The two faced each other again in a King of the Mountain qualifying match, in which both men hit each other with weapons and caused each other to bleed from the head. Harris speared Storm through the tunnel and both men were counted out.

==== Singles competition (2006–2008) ====
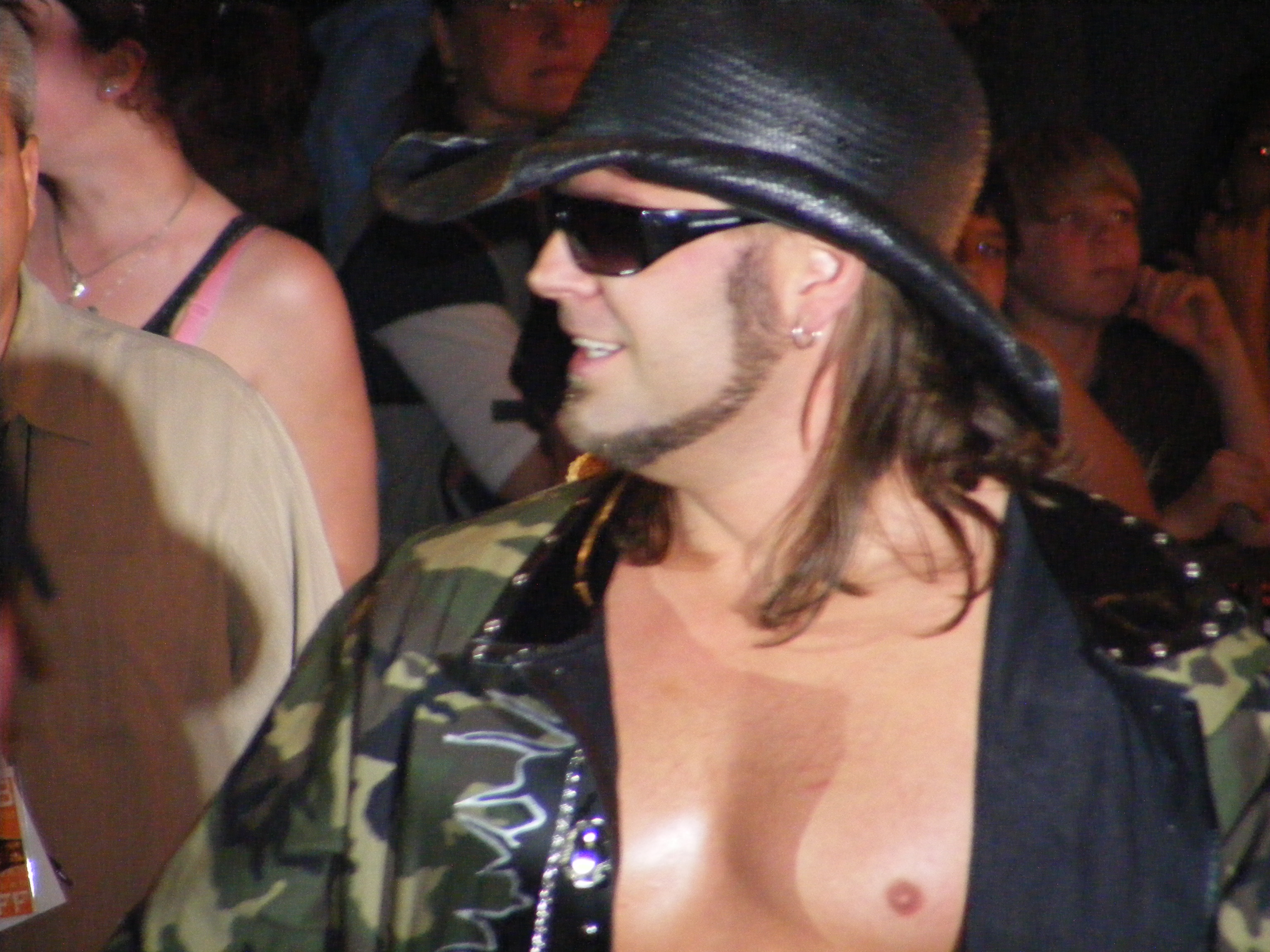
Storm wearing his signature cowboy hat

At Lockdown, Storm and Chris Harris wrestled in a Steel Cage Blindfold match, which had negative reception, winning the Worst Match of the Year award by Wrestling Observer Newsletter. After the match, TNA booker Vince Russo apologized with Storm and Harris and gave them the opportunity to have another match to end their feud, which was a Texas Death match at Sacrifice.

Storm was able to defeat Rhino at the Victory Road 2007 after hitting Rhino with a beer bottle. Their feud continued with Storm again defeating Rhino in a Bar Room Brawl at Hard Justice. For several weeks, Storm would be included in vignettes where he would try to find Rhino at local bars. Rhino then challenged Storm to a match at No Surrender. Rhino defeated Storm by pinfall after he gored Storm through a table.

After Rhino was injured, Storm started a feud with Eric Young over who was the better drinker. Young won Storm's World Beer Drinking Championship (a title unrecognised by TNA, actually a WWE Championship toy belt decorated with beer bottles) and held it for two months before losing it back to Storm in a ladder match. Following this, Rhino made his return from injury and proceeded to deliver a Gore to Storm, challenging him to an Elevation X match. As the ladder match with Eric Young had demonstrated, Storm had a (kayfabe) fear of heights, a major disadvantage in Elevation-X. After teasing a walk-out Storm did in fact compete in the match and after attempting to hide inside of the scaffold structure, Storm ended up losing the match and falling through a table in the ring below. Following a couple of weeks off to (kayfabe) heal his injuries, Storm returned on the live March 27 episode of Impact! and attacked Sting with a beer bottle. On the April 4 episode of Impact!, Matt Morgan allowed Storm to join Team Tomko making it a five on four match (until Matt Morgan himself joined Team Cage). At Lockdown, Storm, along with Team Tomko lost their match against Team Cage. Storm was then announced as one of the "Egotistical Eight" to participate in the Deuces Wild Tournament, and he would have to team up with a random partner, who was later to be revealed as his bitter rival, Sting. Storm then faced Sting in a "No Disqualification" match that Sting won. At Sacrifice, Sting and Storm lost to Team 3D.

==== Beer Money, Inc. (2008–2011) ====
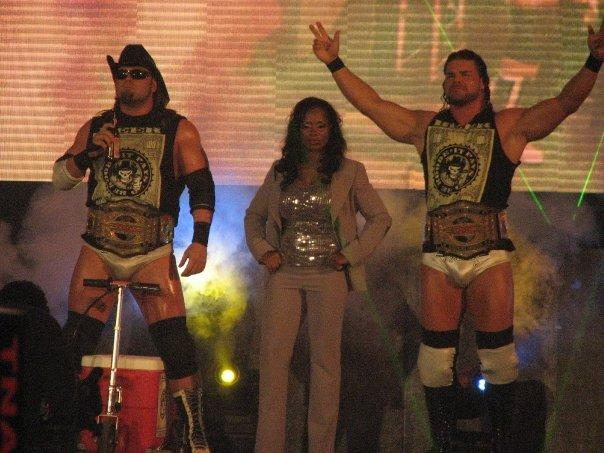
Beer Money as TNA World Tag Team Champions

On the June 12 episode of Impact, Storm, alongside Robert Roode, challenged LAX for the TNA World Tag Team Championship. Storm and Roode were successful in winning the match following a Last Call from Storm to Hernandez with a belt wrapped around his boot. Hector Guerrero (LAX's manager), who was at ringside however, informed the referee about what happened and the match was restarted. LAX ended up retaining the titles following a Border Toss from Hernandez to Storm. After the match, Storm, Roode and Jacqueline handcuffed LAX to the ring posts, and then proceeded to whip them with leather belts. The next week on Impact!, LAX challenged Storm and Roode to a Fan's Revenge Match at Victory Road for the titles. The team of Storm and Roode (now known as "Beer Money") lost to The Motor City Machine Guns (Alex Shelley and Chris Sabin) in one match and Samoa Joe and Kevin Nash in another match later in the July 3 episode of Impact!. At Victory Road, LAX retained the titles. At Hard Justice, Beer Money defeated LAX after Storm hit Homicide with a beer bottle and won the TNA World Tag Team Championship for the first time individually and as a team. At No Surrender Beer Money, Inc. defeated LAX to retain the titles and two weeks later on Impact! they defeated LAX in a six-person tag team match and as a result Hector Guerrero was forced to leave LAX. At Bound for Glory IV, Beer Money, Inc. won the Monster's Ball Match against Matt Morgan and Abyss, Team 3D and LAX to retain the titles. On the January 8 episode of Impact! they lost the titles to Jay Lethal and Consequences Creed, after Lethal cashed in his "Feast or Fired" briefcase. At Genesis Beer Money Inc. won back the TNA World Tag Team Championships when James Storm and Robert Roode defeated Matt Morgan and Abyss and Jay Lethal and Consequences Creed in a 3-way match. Beer Money, Inc. faced Creed and Jay Lethal at Against All Odds, after Lethal and Creed won a number one contenders match against Matt Morgan and Abyss. Eventually Beer Money retained the title after Storm hit the Last Call on Lethal. At Lockdown 2009, Beer Money lost the TNA Tag Team titles to Team 3D in a Philadelphia Street Fight, where Team 3D's IWGP Tag Team Titles were also on the line.

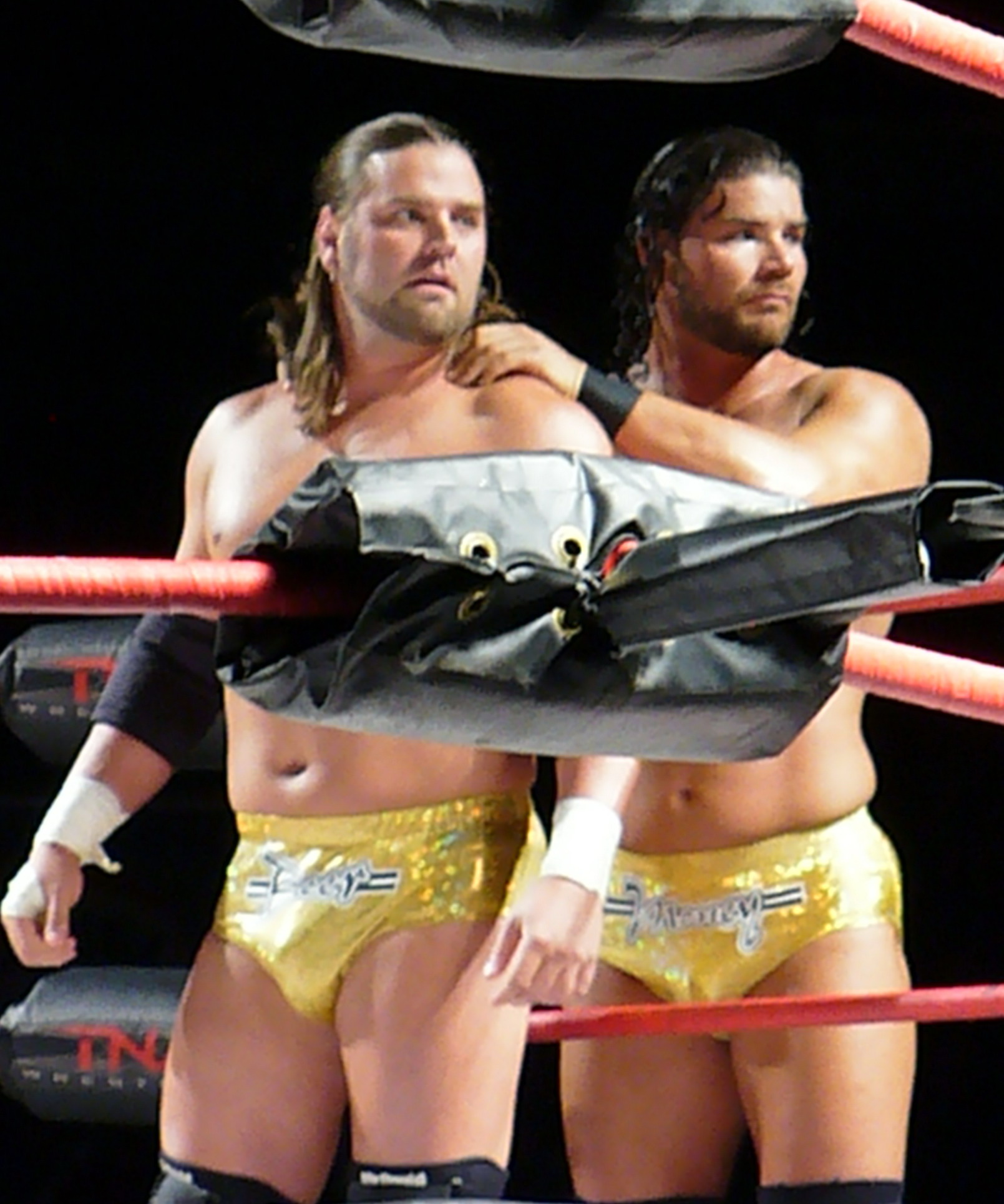
Beer Money; Storm (left) and Roode

On May 15, 2009, Jeremy Borash announced that Cox had signed a new multi-year deal with TNA the previous day. That same month, Beer Money entered the Team 3D Invitational Tag Team Tournament, during which they turned face. At Sacrifice, Beer Money defeated The British Invasion (Brutus Magnus and Doug Williams) to win the tournament and earn the right to challenge Team 3D for the TNA World Tag Team Championship. At Slammiversary, Beer Money defeated Team 3D to win the World Tag Team Title for the third time. The following month at Victory Road, Beer Money lost the titles to Booker T and Scott Steiner of The Main Event Mafia. The two teams would see their feud intervene with that of Team 3D and The British Invasion, causing a four-way war that would last the next three months. Beer Money would go on to lose to the British Invasion in an IWGP Tag Team Championship match at Hard Justice, win a Lethal Lockdown match at No Surrender (teaming with Team 3D against the Mafia and the Invasion), and lose a four-way Full Metal Mayhem match at Bound for Glory for both the TNA and IWGP Tag Team Championships, with Team 3D winning the IWGP Tag Team Title and the British Invasion winning the TNA World Tag Team Title. Beer Money were permitted one last title shot the following Impact!, where they fought the British Invasion in a Six Sides of Steel match. Brutus Magnus would have his team disqualified by punching the referee, causing him and Doug Williams to retain the championship. On the November 12 episode of Impact! Beer Money defeated the British Invasion in a non-title match to join the Motor City Machineguns in the Tag Team Title match at Turning Point. At the Pay-Per-View The British Invasion managed to retain their titles after Kevin Nash nailed Storm with the TNA Global Championship belt. At Genesis Storm and Roode scored an upset victory over The Band of Kevin Nash and Syxx-Pac.

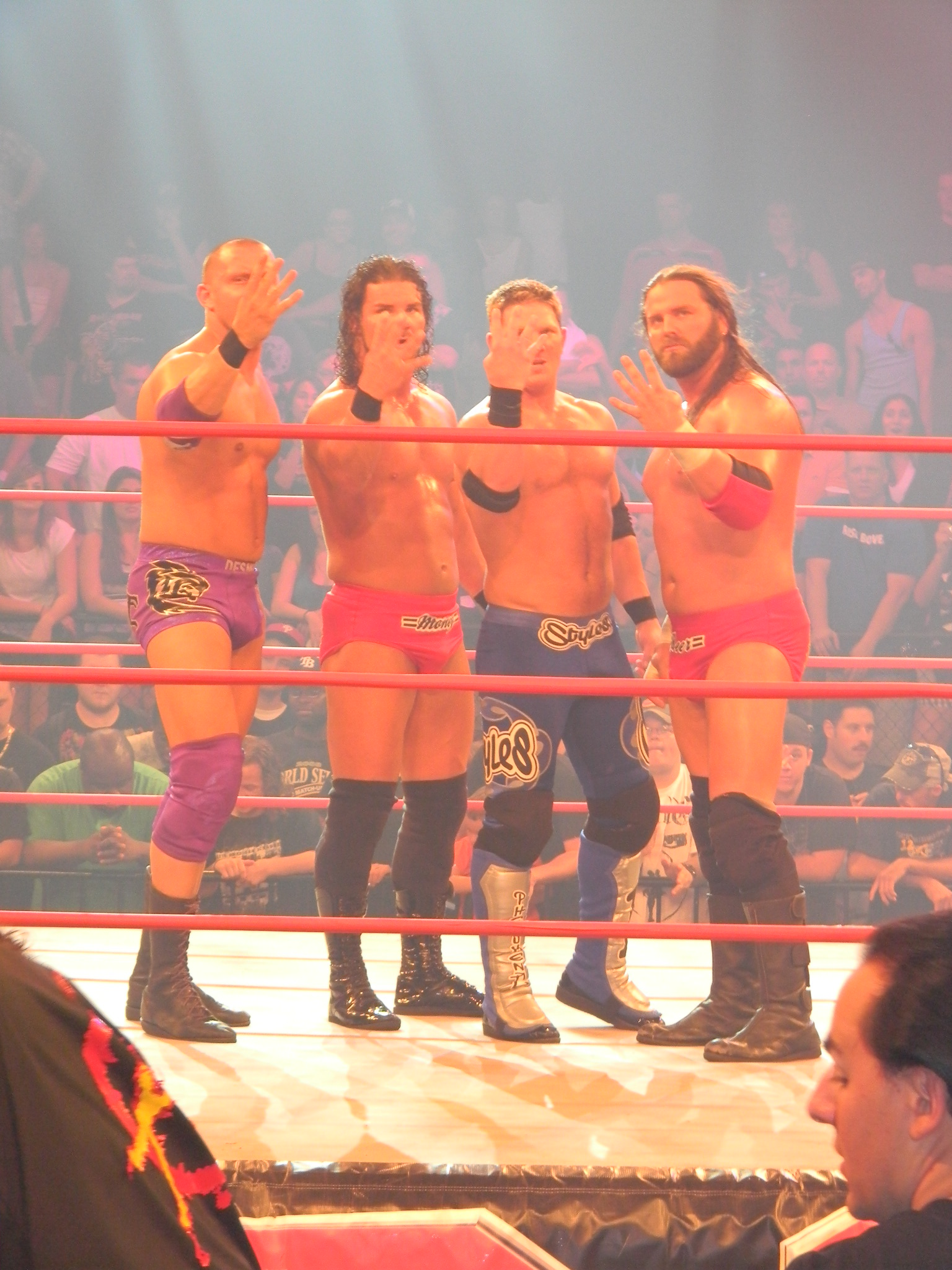
Fortune: (from left to right) Desmond Wolfe, Robert Roode, A.J. Styles, and Storm

With Hulk Hogan and Eric Bischoff taking over TNA at the beginning of 2010, Beer Money's TV time was significantly reduced. Upon their return to Impact!, Beer Money turned heel on the March 8 episode of Impact! by first volunteering to face Jeff Jarrett in a handicap match and then defeating him after a low blow and the DWI, claiming it was the only way they were going to get noticed by the new management. Storm and Roode have since acted as Bischoff's henchmen, taking on wrestlers he's had problems with, often in two-on-one situations. At Destination X Beer Money challenged Matt Morgan and Hernandez for the TNA World Tag Team Championship, but were unable to dethrone the defending champions. At Lockdown Beer Money, along with Sting and Desmond Wolfe, represented Team Flair in the annual Lethal Lockdown match, where they were defeated by Team Hogan (Abyss, Jeff Jarrett, Rob Van Dam and Jeff Hardy). They then started a feud with the newly formed team of Jeff Hardy and Mr. Anderson, known collectively as The Enigmatic Assholes, who would go on to defeat them at Slammiversary VIII. On the following episode of Impact! Ric Flair, who had aligned himself with Storm, Roode, A.J. Styles, Desmond Wolfe and Kazarian, announced that he would reform the Four Horsemen under the new name Fourtune, stating that each of them would have to earn their spots in the group and that in order for Storm and Roode to earn their spots, they needed to become the Ole Anderson and Tully Blanchard of the group. After the TNA World Tag Team Championship was vacated in June, Beer Money entered a four–team, two–week-long tournament to decide who would get to face The Motor City Machine Guns for the titles at Victory Road. Beer Money advanced to the title match at the pay-per-view by defeating Team 3D and Ink Inc. (Jesse Neal and Shannon Moore). At Victory Road Beer Money was defeated by the Motor City Machine Guns in the match for the World Tag Team Championship. After Victory Road Beer Money entered a Best of Five Series with the Motor City Machine Guns, contested for the TNA World Tag Team Championship. Beer Money won the first two matches, a ladder match and a Street Fight, after knocking their opponents out with beer bottles. On the July 29 episode of Impact!, Ric Flair announced that Storm and Roode, who were just one victory away from becoming four–time TNA World Tag Team Champions, had earned the right to join himself, Styles and Kazarian to become the final two members of Fourtune. However, Shelley and Sabin came back to win the two following matches in the Best of Five Series, a steel cage match and an Ultimate X match, to even the score to 2–2 and set up a deciding match for the August 12 episode of Impact!. On the August 12 episode of Impact! Beer Money, Inc. was defeated in a Two Out of Three Falls match and as a result lost the Best of Five Series 2–3. Later that night Douglas Williams and Matt Morgan were added to Fourtune, as the stable attacked EV 2.0, a stable consisting of former Extreme Championship Wrestling performers. In the weeks leading to Bound for Glory, the stable's name was tweaked to Fortune to represent the expansion in the number of members in the group. At Bound for Glory Storm, Roode, Styles, Kazarian and Morgan were defeated in a Lethal Lockdown match by EV 2.0 members Tommy Dreamer, Raven, Rhino, Sabu and Stevie Richards. On the following episode of Impact! Fortune formed an alliance with Hulk Hogan's and Eric Bischoff's new stable, Immortal. At Turning Point Fortune defeated EV 2.0 in a ten-man tag team match and, as a result, EV 2.0's Sabu was released from TNA. The following month at Final Resolution, Storm and Roode returned to the TNA World Tag Team Championship picture by defeating Ink Inc. in a number one contender's match. On January 9, 2011, at Genesis, Beer Money, Inc. defeated the Motor City Machine Guns to win the TNA World Tag Team Championship for the fourth time.

On the February 3 episode of Impact!, Fortune turned face by attacking Immortal, when they interfered in a TNA World Heavyweight Championship match between Mr. Anderson and Jeff Hardy. Ric Flair, who did not take part in Fortune's turn due being out with a torn rotator cuff, returned at the February 14 tapings of the February 17 episode of Impact!, turning on Fortune and jumping to Immortal. On April 17 at Lockdown, Storm, Roode, Kazarian and Christopher Daniels, who replaced an injured A.J. Styles, defeated Immortal representatives Ric Flair, Abyss, Bully Ray and Matt Hardy in a Lethal Lockdown match. The following month at Sacrifice, Beer Money, Inc. successfully defended the TNA World Tag Team Championship against Immortal representatives Matt Hardy and Chris Harris, who had made his surprise return to TNA on the previous episode of Impact!. On the following episode of Impact Wrestling, Immortal assaulted Roode, sidelining him with a storyline shoulder injury. Two weeks later, Eric Bischoff attempted to strip Beer Money, Inc. of their TNA World Tag Team Championship due to Roode's injury, but was interrupted by the champions' former rival Alex Shelley, who agreed to take Roode's spot in the title defense against the British Invasion at Slammiversary IX. At the pay-per-view, Storm and Shelley were successful in their title defense. Roode made his in-ring return on the June 23 episode of Impact Wrestling, in a tag team match, where he and Storm were defeated by Crimson and Matt Morgan. On July 13, Beer Money, Inc. became the longest reigning TNA World Tag Team Champions in the title's history, breaking the previous record of 184 days set by A.J. Styles and Tomko in 2007. On August 7 at Hardcore Justice, Beer Money, Inc. successfully defended the TNA World Tag Team Championship against Mexican America (Anarquia and Hernandez). Two days later, at the tapings of the August 18 episode of Impact Wrestling, Mexican America defeated Beer Money, Inc. in a rematch, following interference from Jeff Jarrett, to win the TNA World Tag Team Championship, ending Storm's and Roode's record-setting reign at 212 days.

==== TNA World Heavyweight Championship pursuits (2011–2013) ====
From June to September, Storm was one of the twelve participants in the Bound for Glory Series to determine the number one contender to the TNA World Heavyweight Championship. When the group stage of the tournament concluded, Storm finished in the top four and thus advanced to the finals at No Surrender along with Robert Roode, Bully Ray and Gunner. On September 11 at No Surrender, Storm was disqualified in his match against Bully Ray, eliminating him from the tournament. After Roode, who went on to win the tournament, had failed to win the TNA World Heavyweight Championship from Kurt Angle at Bound for Glory, Storm received his shot at the title and on October 18 at the tapings of the October 20 episode of Impact Wrestling, defeated Angle to become the new TNA World Heavyweight Champion. Just eight days later, at the tapings of the November 3 episode of Impact Wrestling, Storm lost the title to Bobby Roode, after he used Storm's own beer bottle against him, turning heel in the process and effectively dissolving Beer Money, Inc. Storm and Roode had a rematch for the title the following week. As a result of a backstage attack, Storm came into the match bleeding and eventually lost, after passing out due to blood loss. On the November 17 episode of Impact Wrestling, Storm was attacked by the returning Kurt Angle, who in the process revealed that he had also attacked him prior to the previous week's title match. On December 11 at Final Resolution, Storm defeated Angle in a singles match. On January 8, 2012, at Genesis, Storm was defeated by Angle in a rematch. On the following episode of Impact Wrestling, Storm defeated Angle to become the number one contender to the TNA World Heavyweight Championship. However, the following week Storm was entered into another number one contender's match with Jeff Hardy, which ended in a no contest, following interference from Bully Ray and Bobby Roode. On February 12 at Against All Odds, Storm was unable to capture the TNA World Heavyweight Championship from Roode in a four-way match, which also included Bully Ray and Jeff Hardy. On the February 16 episode of Impact Wrestling, Storm defeated Bully Ray to become the number one contender to Roode's TNA World Heavyweight Championship at Lockdown. On March 18 at Victory Road, Storm defeated Bully Ray in a rematch to retain his spot as the number one contender. On April 15 at Lockdown, Storm failed to regain the TNA World Heavyweight Championship in a steel cage match, after accidentally superkicking Roode out of the cage for the win.

After a two-month break from TNA, Storm returned on June 10 at Slammiversary, answering Crimson's open challenge, defeating him in a singles match and ending his undefeated streak in TNA. On the following episode of Impact Wrestling, Storm entered the 2012 Bound for Glory Series to get another shot at the TNA World Heavyweight Championship, defeating ten other men to win a gauntlet match and take the early lead in the tournament. On the August 30 episode of Impact Wrestling, Storm wrestled his final group stage match and, for the second year in a row, finished in the top four, advancing to the finals of the tournament. On September 9 at No Surrender, Storm was eliminated from the tournament, after losing to Bully Ray in his semifinal match, following interference from Bobby Roode. On the September 20 episode of Impact Wrestling, Storm challenged Roode to a match as part of the Open Fight Night. The match ended in a no contest, when referee Brian Hebner was unable control the two brawling rivals. The rivalry between Storm and Roode culminated on October 14 at Bound for Glory in a street fight, with King Mo serving as the special guest enforcer, which was won by Storm. On November 11 at Turning Point, Storm defeated A.J. Styles and Bobby Roode in a three-way match to become number one contender to the TNA World Heavyweight Championship. However, on the following episode of Impact Wrestling, Storm lost his number one contendership to Roode.

On December 9 at Final Resolution, Storm defeated Kazarian in a singles match, and again on the January 3, 2013, episode of Impact Wrestling, beginning a rivalry with him and Christopher Daniels. On January 13 at Genesis, Storm was defeated by Daniels in a number one contenders match for the TNA World Heavyweight Championship. On March 10 at Lockdown, Team TNA, consisting of Storm, Eric Young, Magnus, Samoa Joe, and Sting defeated the Aces & Eights, consisting of Devon, DOC, Garett Bischoff, Mike Knox, and Mr. Anderson in a Lethal Lockdown match. On the March 14 episode of Impact Wrestling, Storm defeated former rival Christopher Daniels in a singles match. Afterwards, he was attacked by both Daniels and Kazarian before being saved and ultimately assaulted by the returning A. J. Styles. In the following weeks, Storm demanded Styles to explain his actions, but Styles remained mute. Storm finally faced Styles in singles competition on the April 18 episode of Impact Wrestling, where Styles won via submission. On April 26, 2013, Storm unsuccessfully challenged Devon for the TNA Television Championship during a house show in Erie, Pennsylvania.

==== Storyline with Gunner (2013–2014) ====
At Slammiversary, Storm was paired with Gunner to face the teams of Bad Influence, Aries and Roode, and the TNA World Tag Team Champions Chavo Guerrero Jr. and Hernandez in a four-way elimination match for the title, where they won, giving Storm his fifth individual reign. They would hold the titles until October 20 at Bound for Glory, where they lost it to The BroMans in their first title defense. Storm and Gunner received their rematch on the October 31 episode of Impact Wrestling, but were again defeated.

After losing the TNA World Tag Team Championships, Storm began a feud with Gunner when Gunner pulled the Feast or Fired briefcase from Storm, which contained the TNA World Heavyweight Championship match. On the January 2 episode of Impact Wrestling, for the first time in over two years, Storm teamed with his former Beer Money partner, Bobby Roode, to defeat Gunner and Kurt Angle in a tag team match. After the match, Storm further taunted Gunner. On the January 30 episode of Impact Wrestling, Storm apologized to Gunner for his previous actions, and later won a tag team match that night with Gunner against Bad Influence. On the February 20 episode of Impact Wrestling, Storm cost Gunner his Feast or Fired match against Magnus for the TNA World Heavyweight Championship, turning heel in the process. Storm would be defeated by Gunner at Lockdown in a steel cage Last Man Standing match and Sacrifice in an "I Quit" match.

On the May 1 episode of Impact Wrestling, Storm started a feud with Mr. Anderson after he cost Anderson a TNA World Heavyweight Championship opportunity when Storm tried to attack Anderson's opponent Gunner and inadvertently hit Anderson, culminating at Slammiversary, Storm lost to Anderson. But in a rematch on the June 26 episode of Impact Wrestling, Storm defeated Anderson after reversing the Mic Check in a Last Call.

==== The Revolution (2014–2015) ====
In June 2014, Storm would begin a program where he would confront, and verbally run down Sanada. Following Sanada's loss of the X Division Championship to Austin Aries, Storm would confront Sanada backstage, berate Sanada's mentor The Great Muta, while slapping him in the face as a way to break Sanada down, multiple weeks in a row. On the July 24, 2014 edition of Impact, Storm would confront The Great Muta, calling him a fraud, and proclaim himself to be "The Legend" (which in the following weeks replaced his longtime nickname of "The Cowboy"). After spitting beer in Muta's face, Sanada would run Storm out of the ring, before attacking Muta himself with a steel chair, and bowing to Storm, revealing an unknown alliance between them. The following week Storm would proclaim himself as Sanada's new mentor, and master. In the following weeks, TNA would air vignettes of Storm having a cult like hold over Sanada, portraying Storm having him tied up, breaking him down physically and mentally, and proclaiming that "The Revolution is coming". On the August 27 Impact Wrestling, Sanada accompanied by Storm debuted the new ring name "The Great Sanada" and a look inspired by The Great Muta, before defeating Austin Aries with help from Storm. On the September 3 episode of Impact Wrestling, Storm and Sanada abducted former X Division Champion Manik following his loss in a 6-man #1 Contendership match for the X Division Championship. On the following Impact, Storm was shown initiating Manik, much like he did Sanada into his new faction. On the September 17, 2014 edition of Impact Wrestling, Storm and The Great Sanada attacked X Division Champion Samoa Joe, and were joined by Manik, now sporting an all new look, joining Storm's group. On the October 8, 2014 edition of Impact Wrestling it was announced that James Storm and The Great Sanada would battle The Great Muta and Tajiri in the main event of Bound for Glory. This marked James Storm's first appearance in the Bound For Glory main event, as well as the first time in company history that the main event was not contested for the company's World Heavyweight Championship. At Bound For Glory, Storm and The Great Sanada were defeated by Tajiri and The Great Muta. After the match Manik joined in attacking Muta until Team 3D made the save.

Following Bound For Glory, the stable, now known as The Revolution began to recruit members of the TNA roster, beginning with one half of the World Tag Team Champions Davey Richards. After teasing tension between Richards and his partner Eddie Edwards, on the November 12, 2014 edition of Impact Wrestling, The Revolution demanded Davey's decision. When Davey turned down the Revolution's offer to join, they would attack The Wolves, leaving them vulnerable for Storm to bring out his forgotten Feast or Fired Briefcase, guaranteeing him a Tag Team Championship opportunity, anytime, anyplace. In a further twist, Abyss would reveal himself as Storm's partner, and the newest pledge to The Revolution, subsequently defeating The Wolves for the TNA World Tag Team Championships, making Storm a record six-time champion. At Lockdown, The Revolution successfully retained their titles against The Hardys. On January 30, 2015, The Revolution lost the titles against The Wolves. On April 3, 2015, Storm seemingly broke character and confronted Bram when he attempted to attack Mickie James with a steel chair during Bram's match against Magnus, hinting a possible face turn. However, Magnus and Mickie James confronted Storm after the match, to which Storm replied he was merely looking out for an old friend, hinting he was still a heel. However, this all turned out to be a ruse, as Storm wanted Mickie James to join his Revolution stable. She refused, and security cameras recorded him nudging her onto train tracks, causing a concussion, and fully retaining his status as a heel. Storm defeated Magnus at Slammiversary in a non-sanctioned match. On the July 29 episode of Impact Wrestling, Storm revealed the new member of The Revolution, who was Serena Deeb. However, Storm and Serena were defeated by Magnus and Mickie James. Later, James Storm entered in a feud against his former partner Khoya, now known as Mahabali Shera, by attacking him after having failed him over and over. At No Surrender, Storm defeated Shera by disqualification. On the September 30 episode of Impact Wrestling, Storm was defeated by Shera in a No Disqualification match, after an interference of Abyss and Manik. Storm's contract with TNA expired on June 30, but he continued making appearances for the promotion until September 30, 2015, under a pay-per-appearance deal. During October and November (taped in July, before his departure), he participated in the TNA World Title Series. Storm ended third of his block, failing into advance to the finals.

=== New Japan Pro-Wrestling (2009–2011) ===
Through TNA's working relationships with various Japanese promotions, Storm has competed in Japan numerous times, beginning in 2009 when he and Roode, as Beer Money, debuted in New Japan Pro-Wrestling (NJPW), defeating Legend (Akira and Masahiro Chono). They returned to New Japan in October 2010, first defeating Bad Intentions (Karl Anderson and Giant Bernard), and then No Limit (Tetsuya Naito and Yujiro Takahashi). Storm and Roode made their debuts in the Tokyo Dome on January 4, 2011, at Wrestle Kingdom V, taking part in a three-way tag team match for the IWGP Tag Team Championship, won by Bad Intentions.

=== WWE (2015) ===
Storm debuted in WWE's developmental branch NXT during the October tapings, which aired on the October 21, 2015 episode of NXT, defeating Danny Burch. Storm also appeared on the December 2 episode of NXT, defeating Adam Rose. In late December 2015, Storm opted to not sign with WWE, in favor of returning to TNA. In a June 2025 interview with Chris Van Vliet, Storm revealed that he chose not to sign to WWE due to wanting to prioritize his family and unfavorable changes in the contract offer, specifically an increased travel schedule without a salary increase.

=== Return to TNA Wrestling / Impact Wrestling (2016–2018) ===
==== Beer Money reunion and Death Crew Council (2016–2017) ====
On January 5, 2016, episode of Impact Wrestling, Storm returned to TNA, helping his long-time tag team partner Bobby Roode fight off Eric Young and Bram, before reuniting as Beer Money, Inc., after Storm telling Roode that he wanted to "get back to having fun" and drink beer with him, turning Storm face in the process. At One Night Only: Live! event, Beer Money defeated Eric Young and Bram and once again at Lockdown in a Six Sides of Steel match, thus ending the feud. On the January 26 episode of Impact Wrestling, Storm grabbed the TNA World Tag Team Championship briefcase during the Feast or Fired match. On February 9 episode of Impact Wrestling Beer Money attempted to cash in their title shot against champions The Wolves, but in their attempt to cash in, Decay (Abyss, Crazzy Steve, Rosemary) stopped them and mysteriously asked them to join their path. They eventually challenged the group to a match, but it ended in disqualification when Abyss pulled the referee out of the ring and began choking him. Beer Money cashed in their Feast or Fired contract and defeated The Wolves to re-capture the titles on the March 8 episode of Impact Wrestling. They successfully retained their titles against the BroMans on the March 22 episode of Impact Wrestling and against Decay, The BroMans and Eric Young and Bram on the April 12 episode of Impact Wrestling. Their feud against Decay culminated at Sacrifice in a Valley of Shadow match, which Decay won, winning the TNA World Tag Team Championship. In late-March, Beer Money were disbanded upon Roode leaving TNA.

On the May 10 episode of Impact Wrestling, Storm announced that he would return to singles competition. At Slammiversary he challenged and defeated Braxton Sutter. On the June 28 episode of Impact Wrestling, Storm was the guest of the Eli Drake segment Fact of Life, who resulted by Storm hitting Drake with a Superkick. On the August 4 episode of Impact Wrestling, Storm defeated Eli Drake to win the TNA King of the Mountain Championship. The following week, he lost the King of the Mountain Championship in a Title vs. Title match against Lashley. On the August 18 episode of Impact Wrestling, Storm called the official for that match Brian Hebner to the ring to show him how he missed a three-count on Lashley that should have amounted to Storm winning all the titles instead, while complaining to Hebner, TNA President Billy Corgan came down to the ring and interjected himself into the discussion with Storm. Corgan insulted Storm and suggested that Storm "may not be able to win the big one." This set Storm off and he confronted and cornered Corgan, threatening to use Corgan to satisfy his bucket list goal of "kicking a rockstar's ass". Storm then left the ring and on the way up the ramp, Corgan yelled "James Storm is suspended indefinitely".

In October, Storm turned heel when he was revealed as one of the masked wrestlers of the newest group known as Death Crew Council (DCC), with Bram and Kingston. Death Crew Council made their debut on the October 20 episode of Impact Wrestling, when they attacked The Tribunal, following the latter's loss to TNA World Tag Team Champions, The Broken Hardys. DCC continued their assault on TNA wrestlers, including a 3-on-2 Handicap match against Jeff Hardy and TNA World Champion Eddie Edwards. On December 15, Storm would appear at the Hardy Compound as a participant in the Tag Team Apocalypto match for Total Nonstop Deletion. DCC would be eliminated by Decay, when a man whom Decay assault during "Delete or Decay" claimed to be Storm's partner and was knocked unconscious by Crazzy Steve and pinned by Abyss.

On the January 5, 2017 episode of Impact Wrestling, DCC started a feud with Decay when Storm and Bram smashed beer bottles over Abyss and Crazzy Steve's heads, with Bram issuing a threat to Rosemary afterwards. On the January 12 episode of Impact Wrestling, Bram and Kingston would face Decay in a losing effort, after James Storm attacked Abyss, resulting in a disqualification. After TNA was bought by Anthem Media and renamed Impact Wrestling, they were defeated by new tag teams Reno SCUM and LAX, disbanding the team.

==== Final feuds (2017–2018) ====
On the March 30 episode of Impact Wrestling, Storm interrupted Ethan Carter III saying that he wanted a world title shot. The following week on Impact Wrestling, Storm was interrupted by Bram and Kingston as Kingston spat in Storm's face, and Storm laid both guys out with superkicks, turning him face in the process. On the April 13 episode of Impact Wrestling, Bruce Prichard came out to announce the number one contender for the Impact World Championship. It was determined by a fan vote which was agreed upon the previous week by Storm and Ethan Carter III. Prichard announced that the fans decided that Storm will be facing Lashley for the Impact World Championship. The following week, Storm failed to win the title after he was hit with a beer bottle by Carter, allowing Lashley to win the match. On the May 11 episode of Impact Wrestling, Carter came out dressed as a cowboy and proceeded to berate Storm. Storm then tried to attack Carter, but Carter retaliated by lashing Storm over 30 times with a leather belt causing significant injury to the back of Storm. The following week, Storm defeated Carter by disqualification after Carter brutally lashed the referee. At Slammiversary, Storm was defeated by Carter in a Strap match. During the match, Storm suffered a 3rd grade concussion.

Storm would return on the September 21 episode of Impact Wrestling, by saving Eddie Edwards and Ethan Carter III from El Hijo del Fantasma, Pagano and Texano. Storm shook Eddie Edwards's hand but refused to shake Carter's hand. During the special Victory Road episode of Impact Wrestling on September 28, EC3 made the save for Storm after the latter was attacked by Fantasma and Texano. Storm offered to shake Carter's hand, at first Carter refused and walked away, but soon returned to the ring and shook Storm's hand. On the October 4 episode of Impact Wrestling, Storm and Ethan Carter III lost to El Hijo del Fantasma and Texano. At Bound for Glory, Storm, Edwards and Carter defeated Team AAA (El Hijo del Fantasma, Pagano and Texano) in a six-man tag team match. On the November 16 episode of Impact Wrestling, James Storm saved Moose from Lashley and the American Top Team and says that he is tired of Dan Lambert causing chaos on Impact and disrespecting professional wrestling. Two weeks later, after his victory against Texano, Storm was attacked and beaten down by Lashley and American Top Team, but he was saved by Moose. This led to a tag-team match the following week, which Storm and Moose were defeated by Lashley and Lambert. On the November 9 taping of Impact Wrestling which aired on January 4, 2018, Storm was defeated by Dan Lambert after being assaulted by the entire American Top Team and was forced to leave Impact Wrestling.

=== Pro Wrestling Noah (2017) ===
On March 12, 2017, Storm debuted in Pro Wrestling Noah, defeating Kaito Kiyomiya.

=== Independent circuit (2018–present) ===
After leaving Impact Wrestling, Storm began working for various independent promotions. Storm also made an appearance at the Ring of Honor (ROH) and New Japan Pro-Wrestling co-promoted event War of the Worlds on May 12, 2019, where he wrestled Colt Cabana to a time-limit draw for the NWA National Championship. As of 2026, Storm continues to work for various independent promotions.

=== National Wrestling Alliance (2019–2021) ===
After Billy Corgan purchased National Wrestling Alliance, Storm became a regular member of the roster. He wrestled Nick Aldis for the NWA Worlds Heavyweight Championship at NWA New Year Clash, but he was defeated. After Colt Cabana defeated Willie Mack and won the NWA National Heavyweight Championship, Storm challenged him to a title match. The match happened during the ROH television program on June 29, 2019, with Storm winning the title. However, he lost the title against Cabana on October 1, 2019, during the NWA Power television tapings. On January 24, 2020, at the Hard Times PPV Storm and his tag team partner Eli Drake won the NWA World Tag Team Championship. On September 18, 2020, Storm's contract expired with NWA and he became a free agent. On November 10, 2020, Storm and Drake lost the NWA World Tag Team Championships to Aron Stevens and JR Kratos at UWN Primetime Live.

At 73rd Anniversary Show, Storm lost to Chris Adonis in a match for the NWA National Heavyweight Championship failing to win the title. on the October 5 episode of NWA Power, Storm defeated Judais.

=== Second return to Impact Wrestling (2020–2023) ===
On October 24, 2020, at Bound for Glory, Storm made an unannounced appearance as a participant in the Call Your Shot gauntlet match, which he failed to win as he was eliminated by Sami Callihan. At Turning Point on November 14, Storm teamed with Chris Sabin to defeat XXXL (Acey Romero and Larry D). On the January 19, 2021 episode of Impact, Storm returned as a tag team partner for Chris Sabin in a loss to Private Party in a number one contender's match. At No Surrender, Storm and Sabin competed in a three-way tag team match for the Impact World Tag Team Championship, which was won by The Good Brothers. On the March 9 episode of Impact, Storm and Sabin defeated Rohit Raju and Mahabali Shera. At Sacrifice, Storm and Sabin lost to Violent By Design (Deaner and Joe Doering) due to Rhino interfering in the match. On the March 30 episode of Impact, Storm competed in his 1000th Match where he defeated Eric Young. At Rebellion, Storm, Chris Sabin, Eddie Edwards and Willie Mack lost to Violent By Design (Deaner, Joe Doering, Rhino and W. Morrissey).

At Slammiversary, Storm and long-time tag team partner Chris Harris made his return after the tag team title match confronting the Good Brothers and the Briscoes. at Against All Odds, America's Most Wanted, Heath and the Good Brothers defeated Honor No More (Eddie Edwards, Kenny King, Matt Taven, Mike Bennett, and PCO). On the July 14 episode of Impact, Storm lost to Steve Maclin.

At Impact 1000, America's Most Wanted (Storm and Harris) and Team Canada (Scott D'Amore and Eric Young) defeated The Design (Deaner and Kon), Kenny King, and Sheldon Jean in an eight-man tag team match.

== Other media ==
Cox starred in the 2011 horror film Death from Above, alongside fellow wrestlers Kurt Angle, Sid Eudy, Matt Morgan, Terry Gerin and Jessica Kresa.

In 2011, Cox starred in the music video for his theme "Longnecks & Rednecks," which also featured country music duo Montgomery Gentry.

He is a playable character in TNA Impact!, TNA Impact!: Cross The Line, TNA Wrestling Impact! and RetroMania Wrestling.

=== Filmography ===
Year	Title	Role	Notes
2011	Death from Above	Gunnar Halgrim	
2020	Hotel Underground	Tommy Majic	

== Personal life ==
Cox married Dani McEntee on March 30, 2011. They have two sons. He has a daughter from a previous relationship.

== Championships and accomplishments ==
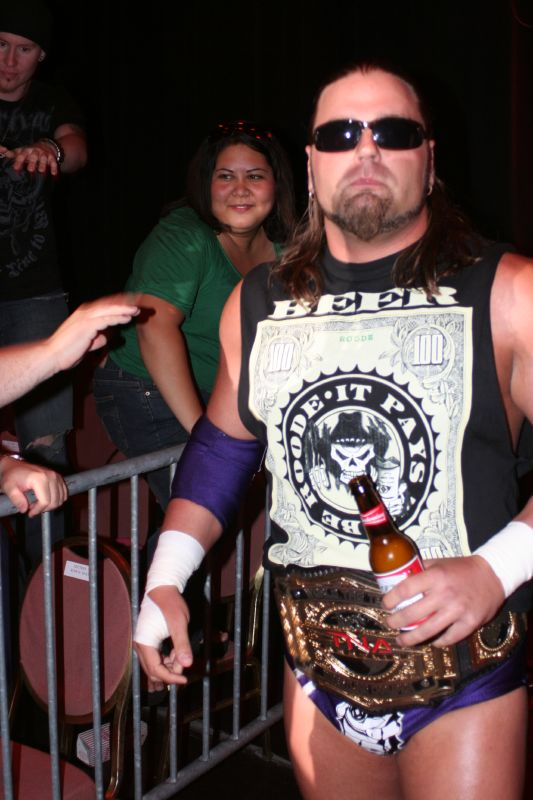
Storm is a 14-time (seven TNA and seven NWA) World Tag Team Champion in TNA.

- 3XWrestling
  - 3XWrestling Heavyweight Championship (1 time)
- Atomic Legacy Wrestling
  - ALW Tag Team Championship (1 time, current) – with Chris Harris
- Big League Wrestling
  - BLW World Heavyweight Championship (1 time)
- Canadian Pro-Wrestling Hall of Fame
  - Class of 2023 – as member of Beer Money, Inc.
- Crash Test Wrestling
  - CTW Heavyweight Championship (1 time)
- European Wrestling Association
  - EWA Intercontinental Championship (1 time)
- Juggalo Championship Wrestling
  - JCW Tag Team Championship (1 time) – with Kerry Morton
- MWA Pro Wrestling
  - MWA Heavyweight Championship (1 time)
- Masters of Ring Entertainment
  - MORE Wrestling Championship (1 time, inaugural)
- National Wrestling Alliance
  - NWA National Championship (1 time)
  - NWA World Tag Team Championship (1 time) – with Eli Drake
  - NWA North American Tag Team Championship (1 time) – with Shane Eden
- NWA Shockwave
  - NWA Cyberspace Tag Team Championship (1 time) – with Chris Harris
- Ohio Valley Wrestling
  - OVW Heavyweight Championship (1 time)
  - OVW National Heavyweight Championship (1 time)
- Pro Wrestling Illustrated
  - Tag Team of the Year (2004) with Chris Harris
  - Tag Team of the Year (2008, 2011) with Robert Roode
  - Ranked No. 12 of the top 500 singles wrestlers in the PWI 500 in 2012
- Pro Wrestling Power
  - PWP Tag Team Championship (1 time) – with Angus Sharp
- The Baltimore Sun
  - Tag Team of the Year (2009) – with Robert Roode
- Total Nonstop Action Wrestling
  - TNA World Heavyweight Championship (1 time)
  - TNA King of the Mountain Championship (1 time)
  - TNA World Tag Team Championship (7 times) – with Robert/Bobby Roode (5), Gunner (1) and Abyss (1)
  - TNA World Beer Drinking Championship (2 times)^{1}
  - NWA World Tag Team Championship (7 times) – with Chris Harris (6) and Christopher Daniels (1)
  - Feast or Fired (2016 – World Tag Team Championship contract)
  - Gauntlet for the Gold (2002 – Tag Team) – with Chris Harris
  - Team 3D Invitational Tag Team Tournament (2009) – with Robert Roode
  - TNA Anarchy Alliance Tag Team Tournament (2003) – with Chris Harris
  - TNA Joker's Wild (2013)
  - TNA Tag Team Championship Series (2010) – with Robert Roode
  - TNA World Cup (2013) – with Christopher Daniels, Kazarian, Kenny King and Mickie James
  - TNA Year End Awards (3 times)
    - Match of the Year (2004) – with Chris Harris vs. Triple X (Christopher Daniels and Elix Skipper) at Turning Point
    - Tag Team of the Year (2003, 2004) – with Chris Harris
- USA Championship Wrestling
  - USACW Heavyweight Championship (1 time)
- USA Pro Wrestling
  - USA Pro Heavyweight Championship (1 time)
- Wrestle Birmingham
  - Wrestle Birmingham Heavyweight Championship (1 time)
- World Wrestling Council
  - WWC World Tag Team Championship (2 times) – with Cassidy Riley and Chris Harris (1)
- Wrestling Observer Newsletter
  - Tag Team of the Year (2005) with Chris Harris
  - Worst Worked Match of the Year (2006) TNA Reverse Battle Royal on TNA Impact!
  - Worst Worked Match of the Year (2007) vs. Chris Harris in a Six Sides of Steel Blindfold match at Lockdown
- Tapw
- American heavyweight championship (1time)

^{1} Championship not officially recognized by TNA. ^{2} Storm won the Championship with Riley, but defended it with Chris Harris.
