= Chris Harris (wrestler) =

American professional wrestler (born 1973)

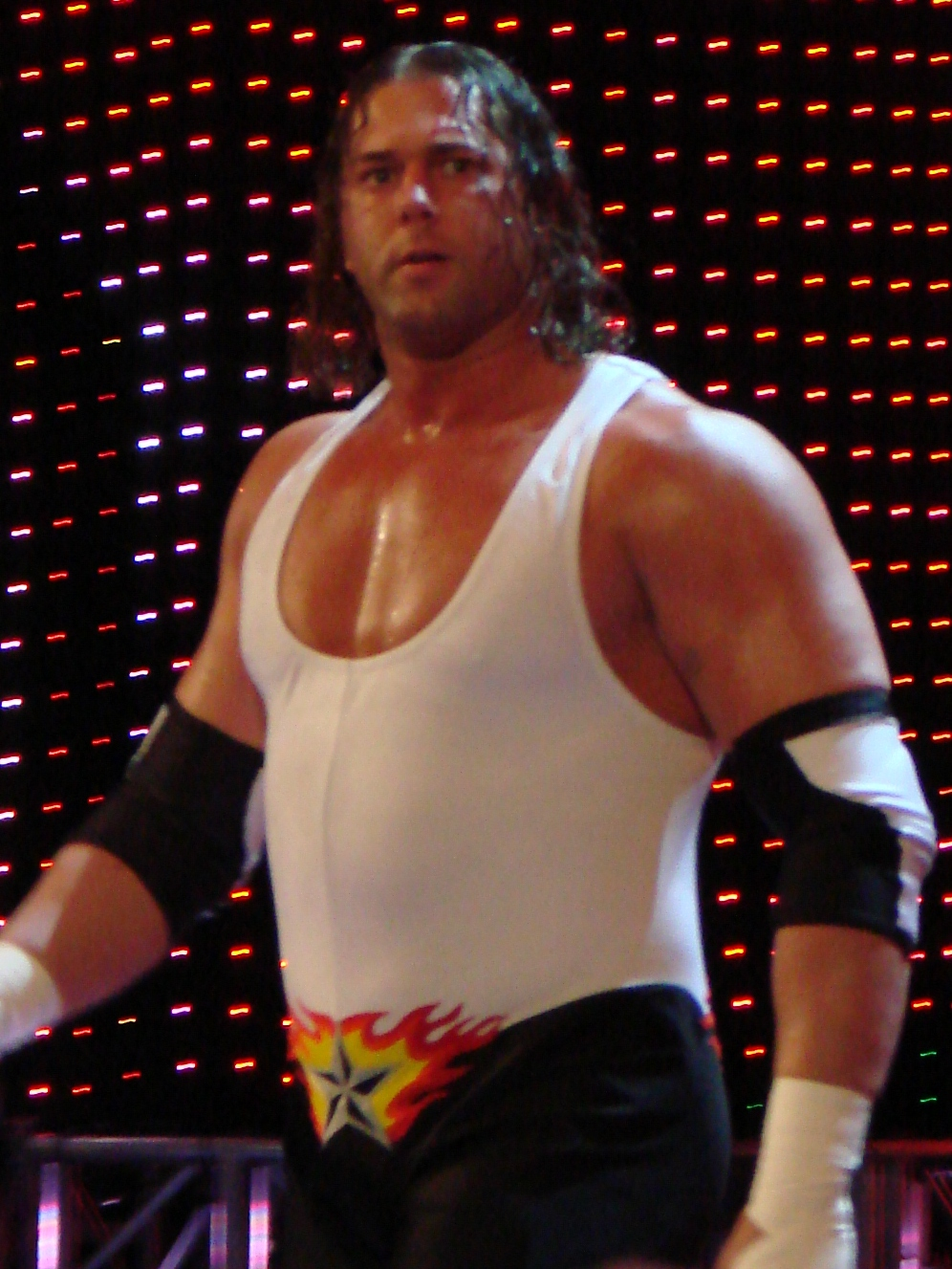
- Harris in 2008

Personal information
- Born: Christopher Eric Harris; December 25, 1973 (age 52) Bremerton, Washington, U.S.

Professional wrestling career
- Ring name(s): Braden Walker; Wildcat Chris Harris; Sting; Bobby Action
- Billed height: 6 ft 4 in (193 cm)
- Billed weight: 250 lb (113 kg)
- Billed from: Fort Wright, Kentucky
- Trained by: Charlie Fulton; Kid Collins; Roger Ruffen
- Debut: November 1994

Christopher Eric Harris (born December 25, 1973) is an American professional wrestler, better known by the ring name "Wildcat" Chris Harris. He currently works on the independent circuit. He is best known for his time with NWA Total Nonstop Action (TNA) as one-half of the tag team America's Most Wanted alongside James Storm, where the duo won the NWA World Tag Team Championship six times. He is also known for his appearances with World Wrestling Entertainment as Braden Walker.

== Professional wrestling career ==
=== Early career (1994–1999) ===
Harris debuted in November 1994. Over the next several years, he wrestled primarily in Kentucky for promotions such as the Northern Wrestling Federation. In August 1996, he made two appearances with the World Wrestling Federation, wrestling two matches on WWF Superstars.

=== World Championship Wrestling (1999–2001) ===
Along with several other wrestlers, including future tag team partner James Storm, Harris was signed to a World Championship Wrestling (WCW) developmental deal in October 1999. Terry Taylor proposed a country singer gimmick for him, but it was rejected by management. He appeared as a fake version of Sting at Halloween Havoc in 2000. He wrestled on the WCW B-shows WorldWide and Saturday Night against the likes of Elix Skipper, Curt Hennig, Shannon Moore, Shane Douglas and Booker T among others and he was also a part of R and B Security until the promotion was sold in early 2001.

=== NWA Total Nonstop Action / Total Nonstop Action Wrestling (2002–2008) ===
==== America's Most Wanted (2002–2006) ====
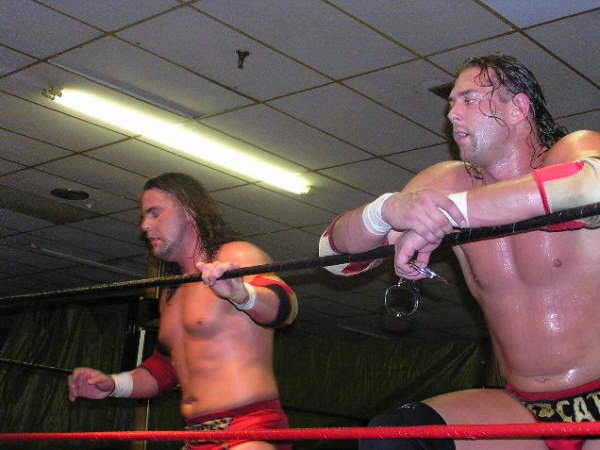
Harris (right) and James Storm in August 2006.

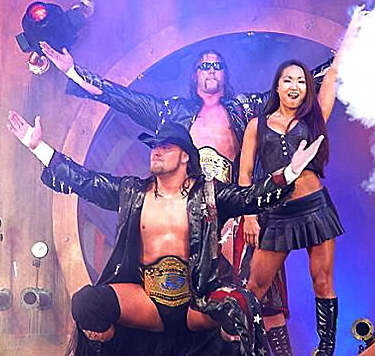
America's Most Wanted – Harris (back), James Storm, and Gail Kim - in August 2007.

On June 1, 2002, Harris was given a tryout match against his long-time independent circuit rival James Storm with Total Nonstop Action Wrestling (TNA) by Bert Prentice. Both were subsequently signed to short-term contracts. He wrestled in the Gauntlet for the Gold match on the first TNA pay-per-view and was placed in a tag team with Storm on the second pay-per-view by Bob Ryder, the creative force behind the team. Storm came up with the name "America's Most Wanted" (AMW) for the team. They obtained their first success on September 18, 2002, by surviving a tag team Gauntlet for the Gold and defeating Ron Harris and Brian Lee to obtain the NWA World Tag Team Championship.

In March and April 2003 the duo teased a split, with Storm and Harris facing off in a singles match on May 7, 2003. Storm won the match, but the partners shook hands afterward. Harris rejected Vince Russo's offer to join his stable of degenerates, Sports Entertainment Xtreme (S.E.X). When Storm was incapacitated by the recurrence of an old shoulder injury in early 2004, Harris received a NWA World Championship shot on March 17, 2004, and was defeated by champion Jeff Jarrett. He went on to compete in a "King of the Mountain" ladder match for the title on June 2, 2004, but was again bested by Jarrett.

America's Most Wanted resumed teaming together, but on August 25, 2004, Storm was sidelined with neck and shoulder injuries, leaving Harris without a partner. Harris teamed with Elix Skipper to win an NWA Tag Team Title for a fifth time on September 8, 2004. Harris and Storm later reunited. On January 16, 2005 Harris became a six time NWA Tag Team Champion (along with Storm), winning the title from Bobby Roode and Eric Young. Harris won the title for a sixth and seventh time as part of AMW. In league with Jeff Jarrett, he would semi-reprise his role as a fake Sting when he played the Crow Sting in a Planet Jarrett retrospective of Sting's career on Impact! on January 7, 2006.

America's Most Wanted split as a team on the December 14, 2006 edition of Impact! during a tag team match with LAX in a Titles vs Team match. Storm effectively chose the outcome of the match by assaulting Harris with a beer bottle, temporarily blinding him in one eye. This allowed Harris to be pinned by Homicide, putting an end to AMW.

==== Singles career (2007–2008) ====
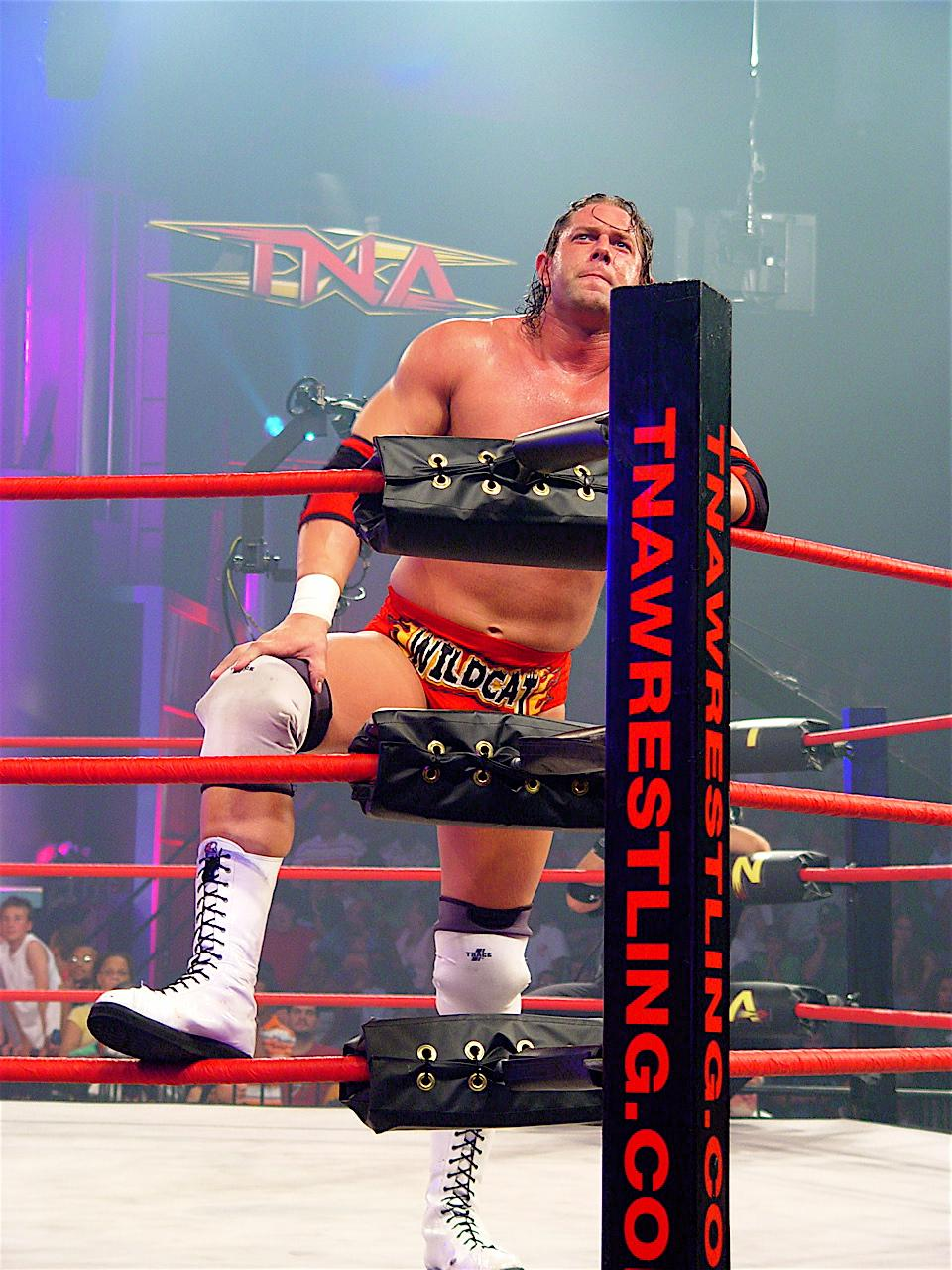
Harris in August 2007

On the January 11, 2007 episode of Impact! Harris did a (kayfabe) sit-down interview with Mike Tenay giving a strong impression his wrestling career could be over. Harris was not seen on television until the Against All Odds pay-per-view in which he (wearing an eye patch) went for Storm. For several weeks, he continued to attack Storm. On the March 1, 2007 episode of Impact! Harris claimed his vision was at 30% and vowed revenge on Storm. At Lockdown, Harris lost to Storm in Six Sides of Steel match, in which both men were blindfolded. It was revealed his vision had been restored, and Harris faced off against Storm at Sacrifice, in a Texas Death match, where Harris came out the victor. After this, Harris showed up two weeks straight to assist Rhino and Hector Guerrero with The Latin American Xchange (LAX). Harris entered into Slammiversary as the last contestant in the King of the Mountain Match, only to lose to Kurt Angle. Harris feuded with Christian Cage, losing to him by roll-up at Victory Road after Dustin Rhodes hit him in the back.

The Harris/Rhodes feud continued for a few weeks with Rhodes attacking Harris during his matches on Impact! until a match was made at Hard Justice, when Harris defeated "Black Reign" Dustin Rhodes via disqualification and at No Surrender Harris defeated Black Reign in a No Disqualification match by pinning Reign. At Bound for Glory, Harris competed in the Fight for the Right Reverse Battle Royal which was won by Eric Young. At Turning Point, Harris competed in the Feast or Fired match but failed to win the match. on the December 13 episode of Impact, Harris lost to Booker T. On the January 3, 2008 episode of Impact, Harris competed in the TNA Heavyweight Gauntlet Match which was won by Christian Cage. On January 10 episode of Impact, Harris lost to Judas Mesias. On January 11, 2008, TNA announced on its website that Harris had been released from his TNA contract.

=== World Wrestling Entertainment (2008) ===
On January 29, 2008, Harris announced that he had signed a contract with World Wrestling Entertainment (WWE). Harris pinned Shelton Benjamin in his WWE debut on March 11, 2008, in a dark match. On the July 8 episode of ECW, he made his WWE television debut under the ring name "Braden Walker", defeating Armando Estrada. He wrestled one more match, a pinfall victory over James Curtis, before he was released from his WWE contract on August 7, 2008.

=== Late career (2008–present) ===
In early September, Harris appeared at the Northern Wrestling Federation (NWF), challenging NWF Heavyweight Champion Ryan Stone. On March 28, 2009, Harris wrestled a match for Full Impact Pro (FIP), losing to Chris Hero.

On the June 24, 2010 episode of Impact!, Harris made a one-night return to TNA, portraying a fake Sting character. On the May 12, 2011 episode of Impact!, Harris made his return to TNA as a member of the heel stable Immortal, when he was introduced by Matt Hardy as his partner in their TNA World Tag Team Championship match against Beer Money, Inc. (James Storm and Robert Roode). Harris made his in-ring return on May 6 at a house show, teaming with Matt Hardy against Beer Money, Inc. in a losing effort. On May 15 at Sacrifice, Harris and Hardy failed in their attempt to win the TNA World Tag Team Championship from Beer Money, when Storm pinned Harris. After the event, it was reported that TNA had chosen not to use Harris again.

On the March 30, 2021 episode of Impact, Harris made his second return to TNA, now known as Impact Wrestling, appearing ringside for James Storm's 1000th match in the company and aiding him in defeating Eric Young. In June 2022 at Slammiversary, Harris and James Storm came to ringside following a bout between the Briscoes and the Good Brothers.

On July 1, 2022 Harris had an AMW reunion in a match with James Storm teamed up with Good Brothers & Heath Slater at Against All Odds, where they defeated Honor No More.

On the September 21, 2023 episode of Impact, America’s Most Wanted (Harris & James Storm) and Team Canada (Eric Young & Scott D’Amore) defeated The Design (Deaner & Kon), Kenny King and Sheldon Jean.

== Other media ==
He appeared in the music video for the Clay Davidson song "I Can't Lie to Me".

== Championships and accomplishments ==
- Atomic Legacy Wrestling
  - ALW Tag Team Championship (1 time, current) – with James Storm
- American States Wrestling Alliance
  - ASWA Tag Team Championship (1 time) – with Abyss
- Mountain Wrestling Association
  - MWA Heavyweight Championship (2 times)
  - MWA Tag Team Championship (1 time) – with Rated X
- Music City Wrestling
  - NWA North American Heavyweight Championship (1 time)
- Northern Wrestling Federation
  - NWF Heavyweight Championship (3 times)
  - NWF Tag Team Championship (1 time) – with Sean Casey
  - NWF Tri-State Championship (2 times)
  - NWF Hall of Fame (Class of 2020)
- NWA Shockwave
  - NWA Cyberspace Heavyweight Championship (1 time)
  - NWA Cyberspace Tag Team Championship (1 time) – with James Storm
- NWA: Total Nonstop Action / Total Nonstop Action Wrestling
  - NWA World Tag Team Championship (7 times) – with James Storm (6) and Elix Skipper (1)
  - Gauntlet for the Gold (2002 – Tag Team) – with James Storm
  - TNA Anarchy Alliance Tag Team Tournament (2003) – with James Storm
  - TNA Year End Awards (3 times)
    - Match of the Year (2004) – with James Storm vs. Triple X (Christopher Daniels and Elix Skipper) at Turning Point
    - Tag Team of the Year (2003, 2004) – with James Storm
- Peel's Championship Wrestling
  - PCW Tag Team Championship (1 time) – with Sean Casey
- Pro Wrestling Illustrated
  - Ranked No. 44 of the top 500 singles wrestlers in the PWI 500 in 2004
  - PWI Tag Team of the Year (2004) – with James Storm
- Purks International Championship Wrestling
  - PICW Heavyweight Championship (1 time)
- World Wrestling Council
  - WWC World Tag Team Championship (1 time) – with James Storm
- USA Championship Wrestling
  - USA North American Heavyweight Championship (2 time)
- Wrestling Observer Newsletter
  - Tag Team of the Year (2005) – with James Storm
  - Worst Worked Match of the Year (2007) – vs. James Storm in a Six Sides of Steel Blindfold match at Lockdown
