= Goof (disambiguation) =

A goof is a term for a mistake, often used in cinema.

Goof may also refer to:

- Goofing off, the act of wasting work time
- Goofy, a Disney cartoon character (nicknamed or sometimes surnamed "Goof")
  - Max Goof, son of the character Goofy
- Space Goofs, a French animated television series
- Goof Bowyer (1903–1988), college football player and coach
- The Goof (officially the Garden Gate), a restaurant in the Beaches neighborhood of Toronto

== See also ==
- Goof off (disambiguation)
- Goofy (disambiguation)
- Goofball (disambiguation)
- Goof Abaaley, a town in the southern Bay region of Somalia
