= Goof off =

Goof off may refer to:

- Goofing off, a slang term for engaging in recreation or an idle pastime while obligations of work or society are neglected
- Goof-off Goose, a character in the Sweet Pickles book series
- Goof-Off or Jester, a character class in Dragon Quest III

== See also ==
- "Stop the World, I Want to Goof Off", a story from the Simpson's episode "Treehouse of Horror XIV"
- Goof (disambiguation)
