= AJ Styles =

American retired professional wrestler (born 1977)

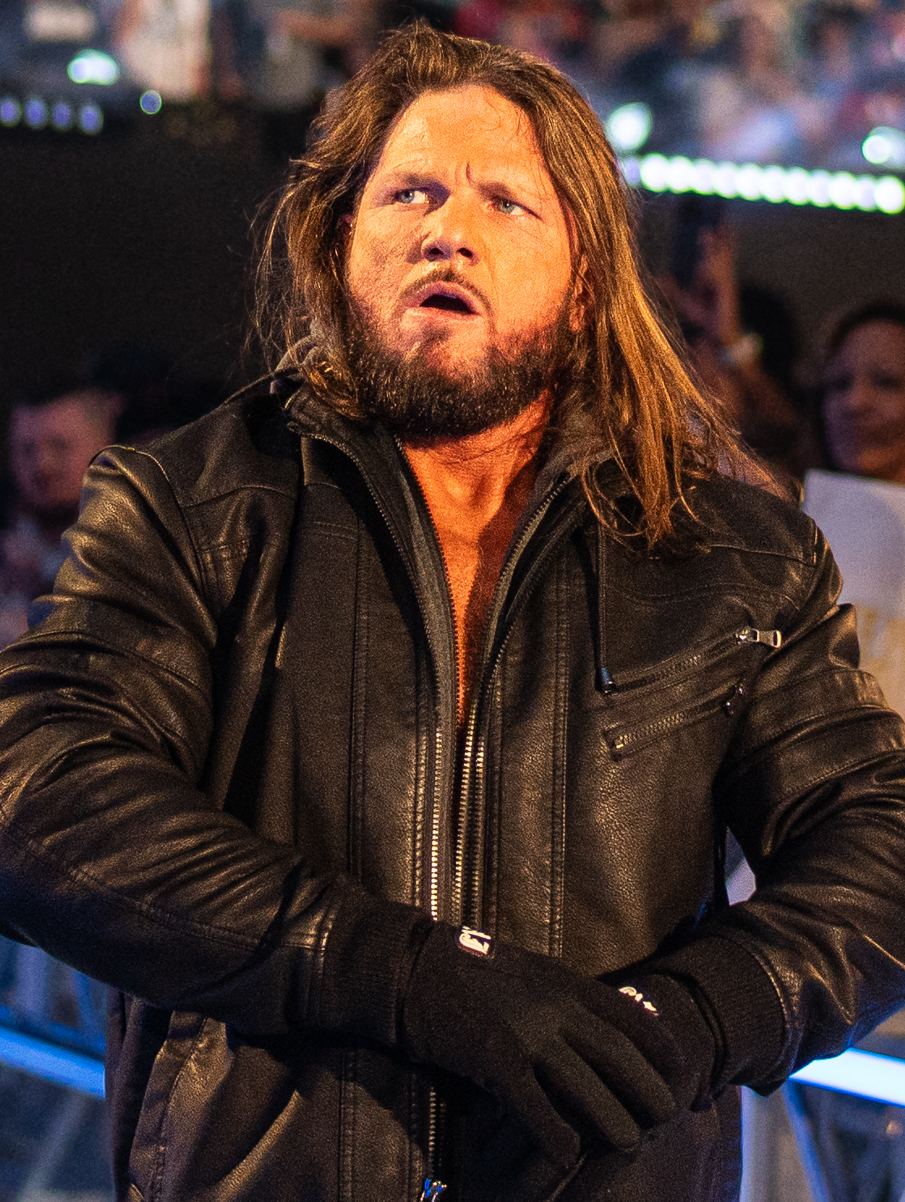
- Styles in 2024

Personal information
- Born: Allen Neal Jones; June 2, 1977 (age 49) Jacksonville, North Carolina, U.S.
- Spouse: Wendy Jones (m. 2000)
- Children: 4, including Avery

Professional wrestling career
- Ring name(s): Air Styles; AJ Styles; Mr. Olympia
- Billed height: 5 ft 11 in (180 cm)
- Billed weight: 220 lb (100 kg)
- Billed from: Gainesville, Georgia
- Trained by: Rick Michaels
- Debut: 1998
- Retired: January 31, 2026

Allen Neal Jones (born June 2, 1977), better known by his ring name AJ Styles (alternatively stylized as A.J. Styles), is an American retired professional wrestler. He is signed to WWE as a talent scout and coach at the Performance Center. He is also best known for his tenures in Total Nonstop Action Wrestling (TNA), New Japan Pro-Wrestling (NJPW), and Ring of Honor (ROH). Jones debuted in 1998 and competed for various independent promotions as well as World Championship Wrestling (WCW) before gaining initial mainstream exposure in TNA.

Jones gained prominence after signing with TNA, having been described as "the cornerstone of the company since its inception"; he won the TNA World Heavyweight Championship twice, the NWA World Heavyweight Championship three times, and was the inaugural titleholder of the X Division Championship, which he won six times. He is also the first TNA Triple Crown and Grand Slam champion. Jones simultaneously appeared in ROH from 2002 to 2006, where he became the inaugural ROH Pure Champion. Jones also wrestled extensively internationally, in promotions such as NJPW, where he is a two-time IWGP Heavyweight Champion and the United Kingdom-based Revolution Pro Wrestling (RevPro), where he is a former RPW British Heavyweight Champion.

Jones first appeared in the World Wrestling Federation (WWF, now WWE) in 2002, but declined a developmental contract. He returned to the company in 2016, and won the WWE Championship twice. With his second victory in Manchester, England, Jones is recognized by WWE as the first wrestler to win the title outside North America. At 371 days, he is tied with Randy Savage for the eighth-longest reign in title history. He also won the WWE United States Championship three times, the WWE Intercontinental Championship once, and the World Tag Team Championship twice, becoming the second wrestler after Kurt Angle to become a TNA and WWE Triple Crown winner and first Grand Slam champion in both promotions, as well as the third man (after Brock Lesnar and Angle) to be both IWGP and WWE Champion.

During his 28-year long career, Jones headlined numerous pay-per-view events, including WrestleMania 36 – Night 1 and Bound for Glory twice (in 2009 and 2013), the flagship events of WWE and TNA, respectively. He ranked atop the annual PWI 500 in 2010, the first TNA wrestler to do so, was voted PWI Wrestler of the Year three times between 2016 and 2018, and Wrestler of the Decade in 2020. He also won 10 Wrestling Observer Newsletter awards, including Wrestler of the Year in 2015 and 2016, and was inducted in their Hall of Fame in 2017. He was inducted into the WWE Hall of Fame's class of 2026.

== Early life ==
Allen Neal Jones was born at Marine Corps Base Camp Lejeune in Jacksonville, North Carolina, on June 2, 1977. He grew up in poverty with an abusive, alcoholic father. The family's poverty was such that they could not afford cable television, which resulted in Jones being unable to watch professional wrestling, his childhood passion. He attended Johnson High School in Gainesville, Georgia, graduating in the class of 1996. Jones took up amateur wrestling in high school and became a two-time state wrestling champion. Jones then attended Anderson University in Anderson, South Carolina, where he was on a wrestling scholarship, and studying physical education. He was then invited by some of his friends to try professional wrestling. He entered a professional wrestling school because his friends were doing it and to find out whether he had a natural aptitude for it. To supplement his income, he worked by mowing lawns and driving an ambulance.

== Professional wrestling career ==
=== Early career (1998–2001) ===
Jones was trained by Rick Michaels and debuted in 1998. In the Georgia-based National Championship Wrestling (NCW) promotion he wrestled as Mr. Olympia, a masked wrestler, losing to Michael Brooks in his first singles match. By August 1999, he had won the promotion's Television Championship. From 1999 to 2001, he generally competed in less notable independent promotions. In December 1999, NCW merged with NWA Georgia to form NWA Wildside, and Jones was renamed A.J. Styles. He appeared sporadically even after signing with NWA-TNA, and is a former NWA Georgia Heavyweight Champion, having defeated Rick Michaels for the title on December 22, 2001, at Christmas Chaos.

=== World Championship Wrestling (2001) ===
Atlanta-based World Championship Wrestling (WCW) had observed Styles' and Air Paris' program in NWA Wildside and offered each a contract in early 2001. Styles (renamed Air Styles) and Paris were placed in a tag team, which was named Air Raid. The team's gimmick saw both men dress in G-suits, with Air Raid also appearing on Thunder. On the March 5, 2001, episode of Nitro, they were entered into a tournament for the newly created WCW Cruiserweight Tag Team Championship but were eliminated in the first round by eventual winners Elix Skipper and Kid Romeo.

=== World Wrestling Federation appearances (2001–2002) ===
On July 9, 2001, Styles had his first World Wrestling Federation (WWF) tryout match against his trainer, Rick Michaels, before the taping of Raw. Styles won with a Shooting Star Press but was not offered a contract. Styles made two more appearances for the WWF in 2002: on the January 26 episode of Metal (taped on January 21), in a losing effort against The Hurricane, and a dark match before the January 27 episode of SmackDown! (taped on January 22), where he was defeated by Rico Constantino. After these matches, WWF offered Styles a developmental deal contract, which would require Styles to relocate to Cincinnati, Ohio, where the Heartland Wrestling Association (HWA) developmental territory was located. Styles ultimately declined the deal, as the move would interfere with his wife's college plans. Despite this, Styles wrestled one non-contracted match for HWA, on February 19 against Matt Stryker in a losing effort.

=== Independent circuit (2001–2002) ===
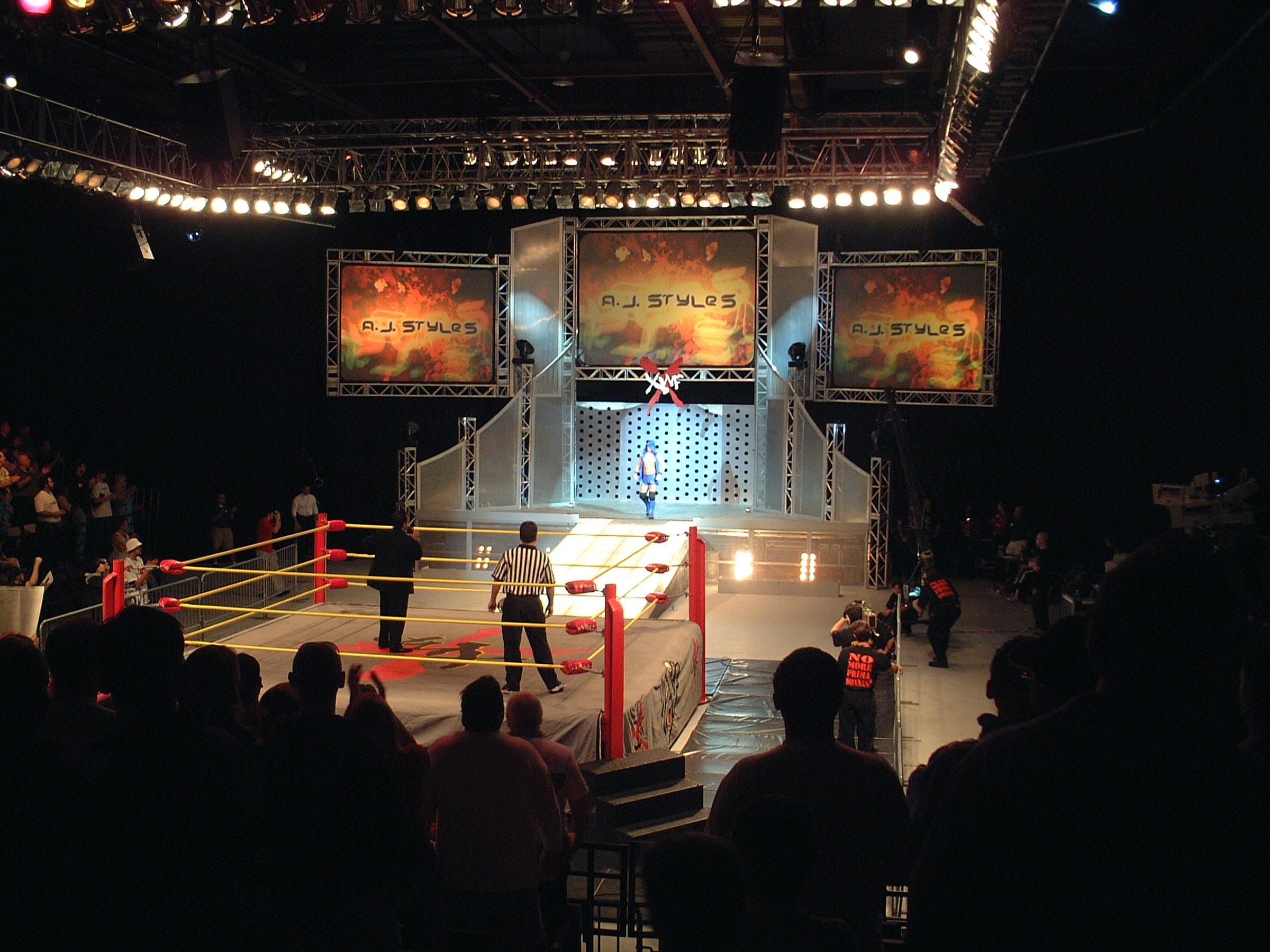
Styles coming to the ring for a Xcitement Wrestling Federation event in November 2001

On October 26, 2001, Styles participated in All Pro Wrestling's King of the Indies tournament, defeating Jardi Frantz in his first-round match but was eliminated by Christopher Daniels in the quarter-finals the following night. On November 13, 2001, Styles debuted in Xcitement Wrestling Federation (XWF), competing in a battle royal against Billy Fives, Christopher Daniels, Juventud Guerrera, Kid Kash, Prince Iaukea, Psicosis and Quick Kick for the XWF Cruiserweight Championship, but was unsuccessful in winning the title. Later that night, Styles defeated Josh Mathews in a match taped for XWF television. The following night, Styles was defeated by Daniels, again in a match taped for the XWF television program.

Styles debuted for Australian promotion World Wrestling All-Stars (WWA) on February 24, 2002, making his pay-per-view debut at The Revolution against Christopher Daniels, Low Ki, Shark Boy, Super Nova and Tony Mamaluke in a six-way cruiserweight survival elimination match, in a losing effort. On April 10, Styles faced Jerry Lynn and Super Nova in a three-way-dance, in a losing effort. On April 12, Styles defeated Nova in a tournament semi-final match at The Eruption for the International Cruiserweight Championship. Styles progressed to the final later that night in which he defeated Jerry Lynn to win the title, which he vacated soon after.

On March 2, Styles debuted in the East Coast Wrestling Association (ECWA), entering the promotion's 6th annual Super 8 tournament. He defeated Xavier in the first round, as well as The Amazing Red in his semi-finals match, but was defeated in the final by Donovan Morgan. On June 15, Styles debuted in Game Changer Wrestling, entering the Jersey-J Cup tournament. In the first round, Styles defeated Qenaan Creed, he then progressed to the quarter-final, defeating Colt Cabana. In the semi-final, he was defeated by Reckless Youth and was eliminated from the tournament.

In October, Styles traveled to the UK, debuting in the Frontier Wrestling Alliance (FWA) on October 13, suffering a loss to Jonny Storm in his debut match at FWA: British Uprising. On October 15, Styles was defeated in an FWA British Heavyweight Championship number one contender round-robin challenge three-way match by Doug Williams and Jerry Lynn at FWA: Seasons Beatings. Later that night, Styles defeated Jody Fleisch in the same round-robin challenge. On November 1, Styles debuted in IWA: Mid-South, taking part in the promotions annual Ted Petty Invitational tournament, but was defeated by Christopher Daniels in the first round.

=== Ring of Honor (2002–2006) ===
==== Early years (2002–2004) ====
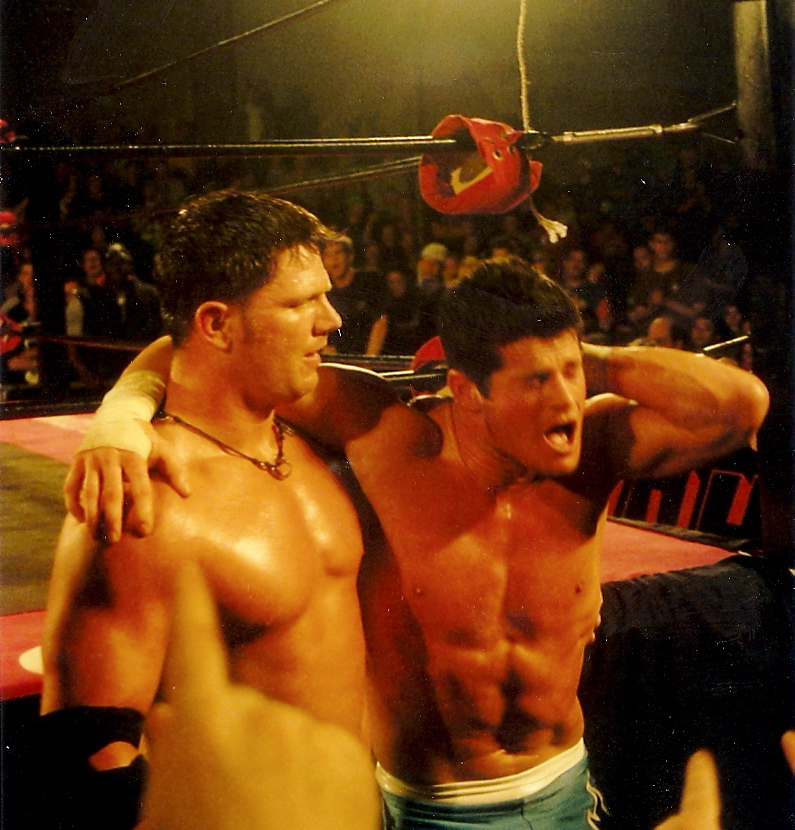
Styles with Matt Sydal at an ROH event in 2006

Styles debuted in Ring of Honor (ROH) at its third show, 2002's A Night of Appreciation, and quickly became a main eventer (e.g., performing in main event matches against Low Ki for the ROH World Championship at Honor Invades Boston). After failing to win the title, he became the first holder of the Number One Contender's Trophy, which was viewed within the promotion as a secondary championship at the time. At the First Anniversary Show in February 2003, Styles competed against Low Ki and Paul London in a three-way match, which was won by London. After this, Styles competed by himself and defeated The Backseat Boyz (Johnny Kashmere and Trent Acid), The Carnage Crew (HC Loc and Tony DeVito), and The S.A.T. (Joel and Jose Maximo), to receive a title shot for the ROH Tag Team Championship. He chose Amazing Red as his partner, and the two defeated The Prophecy (Christopher Daniels and Xavier) to win the championship. Styles then feuded with London, who was upset that he had chosen Red as his partner, wrestling to a draw at Night of the Grudges. Styles and Red then defeated The Briscoe Brothers (Jay and Mark Briscoe) on three separate occasions, but lost to The Prophecy. At Wrath of the Racket, Christopher Daniels and Dan Maff put Red out of action and Styles picked Homicide as his replacement partner. Styles and Homicide beat The Prophecy, but Styles had to vacate the title due to Red being sidelined by a legitimate injury.

After his reign as ROH Tag Team Champion, Styles took Jimmy Rave as his protégé and attempted to become the ROH World Champion, defeating Bryan Danielson at Main Event Spectacles to become the number one contender. At War of the Wire, Styles unsuccessfully challenged Samoa Joe for the title. He then defeated CM Punk, Jimmy Rave, and Matt Stryker in a one-night tournament at the Second Anniversary Show to become the first ROH Pure Wrestling Champion. Styles defeated Punk in a rematch with Ricky Steamboat as the guest referee at At Our Best for his final match for ROH in 2004, as TNA withdrew all of its contracted wrestlers from all ROH events and ROH vacated the title.

==== Feud with Jimmy Rave (2005–2006) ====
Styles returned to Ring of Honor at the Third Anniversary Celebration: Part Two to wrestle Jimmy Rave, who accused him of stealing the Styles Clash (which he called the Rave Clash) from him, though he was unsuccessful in defeating Rave. During his feud with Rave and The Embassy, Styles formed an alliance with Generation Next, who were also feuding with The Embassy. At Glory by Honor IV, Styles defeated Rave with Mick Foley in his corner, with the stipulation that the loser could no longer use the Rave/Styles Clash in Ring of Honor. At This Means War, he defeated Generation Next leader Austin Aries, who was attacked by The Embassy following the show. At Vendetta, Styles had his final match against The Embassy when he, along with Austin Aries, Jack Evans and Matt Sydal were defeated by Abyss, Alex Shelley, Jimmy Rave, and Prince Nana in an eight-man tag match.

Following his feud with The Embassy, Styles set his sights on winning a championship. At A Night of Tribute, Styles faced Christopher Daniels and Matt Sydal in a three-way match, which Daniels won. On the first show of 2006, Styles wrestled and defeated Matt Sydal, after which the two agreed to form a tag team and challenge for the ROH Tag Team Championship, which was held by Sydal's Generation Next teammates Austin Aries and Roderick Strong. Before receiving a shot at the tag team title, Styles received a shot at the ROH World Championship when he was handpicked by Bryan Danielson, but he was unsuccessful. At the Fourth Anniversary Show, Styles and Sydal received their shot at the ROH Tag Team Championship, but were unable to defeat the champions. After an absence, Styles returned at Death Before Dishonor IV, defeating Davey Richards. Styles returned at Time to Man Up, losing to Samoa Joe. In a pre-taped promo, Styles said he would be taking several months off from ROH following the match; however, ROH commentators continually referred to the match as his final match and even played a special tribute to him after it.

=== NWA: Total Nonstop Action / Total Nonstop Action Wrestling (2002–2014) ===
==== NWA World Heavyweight Champion (2002–2004) ====
In May 2002, Styles was signed to a non-exclusive contract by NWA: Total Nonstop Action (NWA-TNA). He appeared on the first weekly TNA pay-per-view, teaming with Low Ki and Jerry Lynn and losing to The Flying Elvises (Jimmy Yang, Jorge Estrada and Sonny Siaki). The following week, Styles defeated Low Ki, Jerry Lynn and Psicosis in a double elimination match to become the inaugural TNA X Division Champion. He won a second title on the third TNA pay-per-view, teaming with Lynn and defeating Bruce and Lenny Lane in the finals of a tournament for the vacant NWA World Tag Team Championship. Styles successfully defended both titles in the following weeks but began to bicker with the veteran Lynn during their matches together. On August 7, Styles lost the X Division title to Low Ki in a three-way dance also involving Lynn. The following week, he and Lynn fought Jeff Jarrett and Ron Killings to a no contest, and the tag team title was held-up as a result. The following week, he and Lynn fought one another in a Falls Count Anywhere match (which was won by Lynn), a no disqualification match (which was won by Styles) and a ten-minute Iron Man match, which ended in a draw after both men scored three pinfalls. On August 28, Low Ki defended the X Division Championship against Lynn and Styles in a ladder match and lost the title to Lynn. Recruiting Mortimer Plumtree and Sonny Siaki as allies, Styles continued to feud with Lynn in successive weeks. On October 23, he defeated Syxx-Pac for the X Division Championship, but lost the title to Lynn on November 6 and tried unsuccessfully to regain it throughout the remainder of the year.

In 2003, Styles began focusing on the NWA World Heavyweight Championship and briefly associated himself with Vince Russo's Sports Entertainment Xtreme (S.E.X.) stable, winning the title from Jarrett in a three-way match, becoming the first TNA Triple Crown. He dropped the title back to Jarrett on October 22. Styles feuded with Abyss and Jeff Jarrett throughout January, and on February 4, 2004, after Styles demanded a title shot, Jarrett's ally Don Callis forced him to team with Abyss in a match with the NWA World Tag Team Champions, Kevin Northcutt and Legend, which Styles' won, despite being abandoned by Abyss. The following week, Styles defeated Abyss in a match to determine the sole owner of the tag team championship by disqualification after Jarrett interfered, but his victory was overturned by Callis, leading to another match the following week which was won by Abyss after Lex Luger interfered, thus granting Abyss sole control of the tag team championship. On March 17, Abyss defeated Styles to become the number one contender to the NWA World Heavyweight Championship. Russo granted Styles a championship steel cage match against Jarrett on April 21, where he won his second world title. He successfully defended the title in matches with Ron Killings, Raven and Chris Harris, and on May 19 he defended against all three men in a four-way title match. Styles lost the title to Killings after Jarrett interfered in the match, hitting him with a guitar.

==== X Division Champion (2004–2007) ====
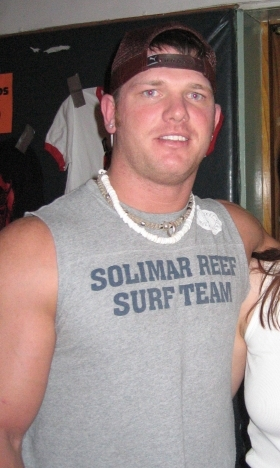
Styles in 2005

Styles returned to the X Division shortly thereafter, winning a four-way match to become the number one contender to the X Division Championship on the June 4 episode of Impact!. On June 9, he defeated Frankie Kazarian to become a three-time X Division Champion. In the following weeks, Styles feuded with Kid Kash and Dallas, while successfully defending the title in matches with Kazarian and Mr. Águila. An additional match on June 23 with the debuting Jeff Hardy was interrupted by Kash and Dallas. On July 28, he defended the title against Kazarian and Michael Shane in an Ultimate X match. After Kash struck Styles with a crutch, Shane and Kazarian simultaneously retrieved the title belt and became co-X Division Champions. After several abortive attempts to regain the title, Styles fought Kash in a number of matches, culminating on September 8 in a tables match which was won by Styles. In October, Styles began feuding with Petey Williams (who by then was the TNA X Division Champion) and on November 7 at Victory Road, the first monthly pay-per-view event held by TNA, Styles failed to regain the title from Williams.

At Final Resolution on January 16, 2005, Styles won the X Division Championship for a fourth time in an Ultimate X match, defeating Chris Sabin and the reigning champion Petey Williams. Styles faced Christopher Daniels for the first time on the January 21 episode of Impact!, and after failing to defeat him in ten minutes, qualified for a thirty-minute Iron Man match for the championship at Against All Odds on February 13, where Styles defeated Daniels to retain the title after initial tying and going into "sudden death" rules. The feud between Styles and Daniels continued and at Destination X on March 13, Styles lost the title to him in an Ultimate X Challenge also featuring Ron Killings and Elix Skipper.

After defeating Abyss at Lockdown on April 24 to become the number one contender to the NWA World Heavyweight Championship, Styles won his third world championship from Jeff Jarrett at Hard Justice on May 15, which he lost to Raven in a King of the Mountain match at Slammiversary on June 19. Styles then entered the TNA 2005 Super X Cup Tournament, which granted the winner a shot at the X Division Championship. Styles defeated Matt Bentley in the quarter-finals and Petey Williams in the semi-finals, but lost to Samoa Joe at Sacrifice on August 14. As Christopher Daniels (the reigning X Division champion) had interfered in the match, TNA Director of Authority Larry Zbyszko added Styles to the resultant title bout. At Unbreakable on September 11, Styles defeated Samoa Joe and Daniels in a critically lauded three-way match to become the X Division Champion for a fifth time.

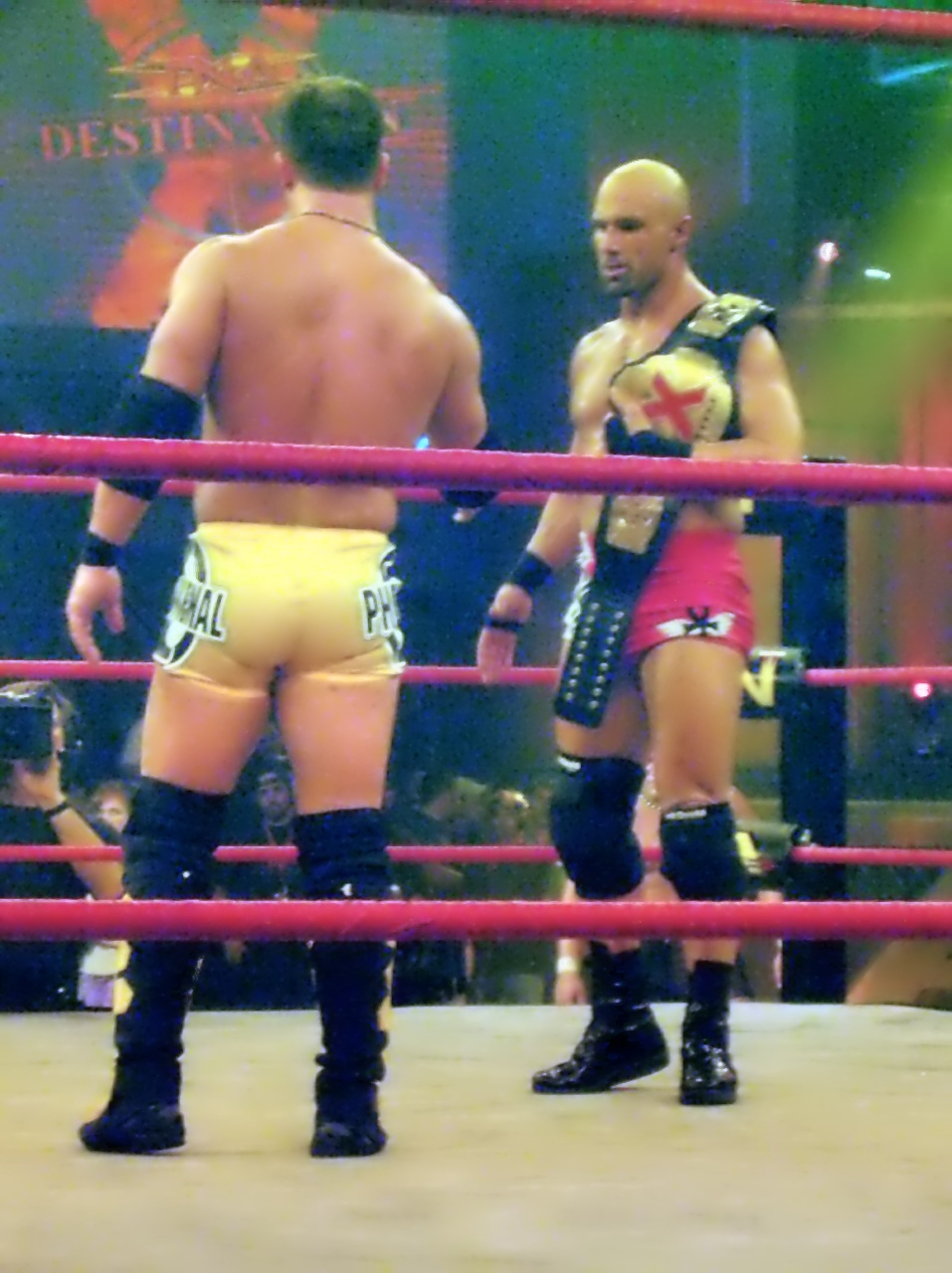
Styles teamed and feuded with Christopher Daniels throughout 2005.

At Bound for Glory on October 23, Styles successfully defended the title against Christopher Daniels in the second thirty-minute Iron Man match. The following month at Genesis on November 13, Styles successfully defended the title against Petey Williams. Styles then started a feud with Joe, claiming that he had broken the unwritten "code of the X Division" by brutally beating Daniels. At Turning Point on December 11, Styles lost the X Division Championship to Joe. Styles was unsuccessful in retaining the title in a triple threat match, also featuring Daniels, at Against All Odds on February 12, 2006, and in an Ultimate X match at Destination X on March 12, which Daniels won. After Daniels lost the title back to Joe, Styles joined Daniels to challenge America's Most Wanted for the NWA World Tag Team Championship. After losing to America's Most Wanted in title matches on two occasions, Styles and Daniels won the NWA World Tag Team Championship at Slammiversary on June 18. They successfully retained against The Latin American Xchange (Homicide and Hernandez) (LAX) at Hard Justice on August 13, only to lose the title to them in a Border Brawl on the August 24 episode of Impact!. They regained the titles at No Surrender on September 24, but dropped them back to LAX at Bound for Glory on October 22 in a Six Sides of Steel match.

On the November 2 episode of Impact!, Styles pinned Chris Sabin to begin his sixth reign as the new X Division Champion. The match was also the quarter-finals of the Fight for the Right tournament for number one contendership to Sting's NWA World Heavyweight Championship; Styles won the semi-final match on the November 9 Impact! but was pinned in the finals by Abyss. On the November 16 episode of Impact!, Styles lost the X Division Championship to Daniels in a three-way match when Daniels scored the roll-up pinfall on Sabin. At Genesis on November 19, Styles lost to Christian Cage, which Styles blamed on Daniels, who had tried to intervene on his behalf. Styles then turned heel and feuded with Rhino for attempting to reconcile him with Daniels and at Turning Point on December 10 he beat Rhino, and on the December 22 episode of Impact!, Styles and Samoa Joe defeated Rhino and Kurt Angle. Rhino then defeated Styles in a Last Man Standing match at Final Resolution on January 14, 2007, and at Destination X on March 11 in an Elevation X match.

==== Various alliances (2007–2009) ====
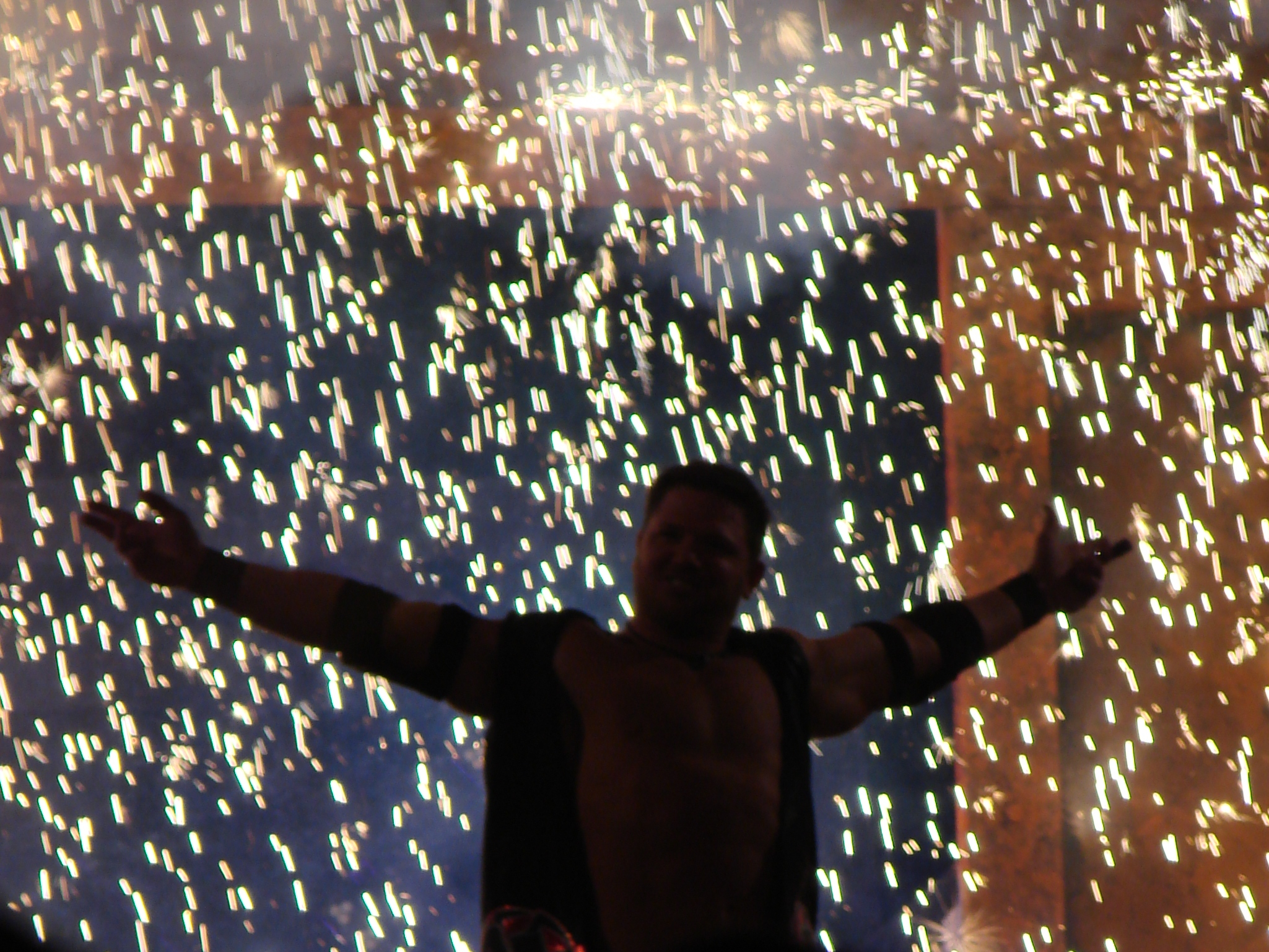
Styles making his entrance at Lockdown in April 2007

Styles aligned with Christian Cage for Lockdown on April 15, forming Team Cage (later Christian's Coalition), who were defeated by Team Angle at Lockdown. Styles teamed with Tomko to face Sting and Abyss at Victory Road on July 15, but were defeated. At No Surrender on September 9, Styles and Tomko won a ten-tag team gauntlet match to earn a tag team title match at Bound for Glory on October 14 against Team Pacman (Adam Jones and Ron Killings), where they defeated them to win the TNA World Tag Team Championship. They successfully defended against LAX on the November 1 episode of Impact! and at Genesis on November 11 against The Steiner Brothers (Rick and Scott Steiner). Later that night, Styles and Tomko inadvertently cost Cage his match and helped Kurt Angle retain the world championship. Over the next few weeks, Styles struggled to choose between aligning Cage and Angle, until he joined The Angle Alliance at Final Resolution on January 6, 2008.

In February, Styles was involved in a storyline in which he became accidentally married to Karen Angle. Meanwhile, Styles and Tomko lost the TNA World Tag Team Championship to Kaz and Super Eric on the April 17 episode of Impact!. With Kurt constantly accusing Styles and Karen of an affair and both denying anything beyond friendship, Styles quit The Angle Alliance. In retaliation, Tomko cost Styles his King of the Mountain qualifying match against Booker T on the May 22 episode of Impact!, turning Styles face. At Slammiversary on June 8, Styles defeated Angle after a distraction by Karen, but was beat-down by Angle and Tomko after the match. The feud continued through Hard Justice on August 10, where he defeated Angle in a Last Man Standing match. They continued trading wins and on the following episode of Impact! he defeated Angle for his Olympic gold medal. Styles also won the ladder rematch the following week to end their feud, but he was later asked to give Angle back his gold medal by Jeff Jarrett in an effort to try to mend things with Angle.

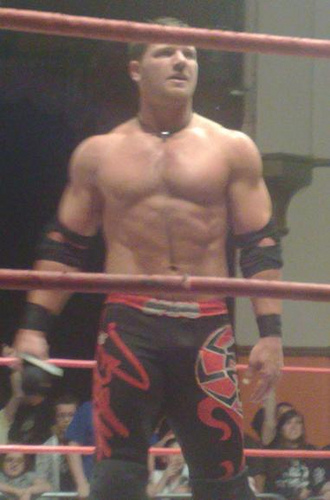
Styles at a TNA show in September 2008

At Bound for Glory IV on October 12, Styles faced Christian Cage and Booker T in a three-way match in which Booker T won. Shortly after that, Booker T, Kurt Angle, Kevin Nash and Sting formed The Main Event Mafia, and Styles teamed up with Samoa Joe to fight them. On the October 30 episode of Impact!, Styles and Joe formed a faction of younger wrestlers known as The TNA Front Line to combat The Main Event Mafia, who recruited Scott Steiner. Styles challenged Sting for the TNA World Heavyweight Championship at Turning Point on November 9 and again in an eight-man tag team match at Final Resolution on December 7, but was unsuccessful each time. On the January 22, 2009, episode of Impact!, Angle vowed to end Styles' career and later that night beat Styles in a tables match, where Styles was injured (kayfabe).

At Against All Odds on February 8, Styles returned by attacking Booker T and stealing his TNA Legends Championship. Styles defeated Booker T to become Legends Champion (and the first TNA Grand Slam Champion) at Destination X on March 15, and he retained in a rematch at Sacrifice. At Slammiversary on June 21, Styles competed in the King of the Mountain match for the TNA World Heavyweight Championship, but was unsuccessful after Samoa Joe turned on The Front Line and helped Angle win. Nash won Styles' Legends Championship at Victory Road on July 19. Following the loss, Styles began a "Best of Three Series" against Matt Morgan for entry into the TNA World Heavyweight Championship match with Sting and Angle at Hard Justice on August 16, which saw Styles winning the first match, but losing the following two, resulting in Morgan advancing to Hard Justice.

==== TNA World Heavyweight Champion (2009–2010) ====
On the August 20 episode of Impact!, Styles was talked out of retiring by Sting, who said he had chosen Styles to carry the torch after him. At No Surrender on September 20, Styles won the TNA World Heavyweight Championship in a five-way match against Matt Morgan, Sting, Hernandez and defending champion Kurt Angle. At Bound for Glory on October 18, Styles retained the title against Sting, ending his undefeated streak at Bound for Glory in the process. Styles was mysteriously attacked by an anonymous assailant backstage leading him to believe it was Samoa Joe or Christopher Daniels, both of whom he faced the following month at Turning Point on November 15 to retain the TNA World Heavyweight Championship. Styles continued to successfully defend the title against Desmond Wolfe on the December 10 episode of Impact!, against Daniels at Final Resolution on December 20, against Angle on the January 4, 2010, episode of Impact! and against Tomko, who had been revealed as his mystery attacker, on the January 14 episode of Impact!.

At Genesis on January 17, Styles defeated Angle in a Last Chance match to again retain the championship with assistance from Ric Flair, turning heel in the process. On the January 21 episode of Impact!, Flair aligned himself with Styles, whom he christened "The New Nature Boy", but on the same episode Hulk Hogan scheduled a Genesis rematch, in which interference by Flair would cause Styles to lose the title to Angle. During the match, Angle applied his signature move, the ankle lock, on Styles, who reversed it and applied the same move to Angle, when suddenly referee Earl Hebner, paid off by Flair, called for the bell although Angle did not submit. At Against All Odds on February 14, Styles retained the title against Samoa Joe, with help from Flair, in a match refereed by Eric Bischoff. On the March 8 episode of Impact!, Styles teamed up with Ric Flair in a tag team match, in a losing effort against Abyss and Hulk Hogan. Styles defended the title against Abyss at Destination X on March 21 in a match that went to no contest after Abyss hit Styles with a chokeslam through the ring. At Lockdown on April 18, Styles successfully defended the title against D'Angelo Dinero in a steel cage match. The following day on Impact!, Styles dropped the TNA World Heavyweight Championship to Rob Van Dam, ending his reign at a then-record 211 days. Styles faced Van Dam in a rematch at Sacrifice on May 16, but was defeated again.

==== Fortune (2010–2012) ====
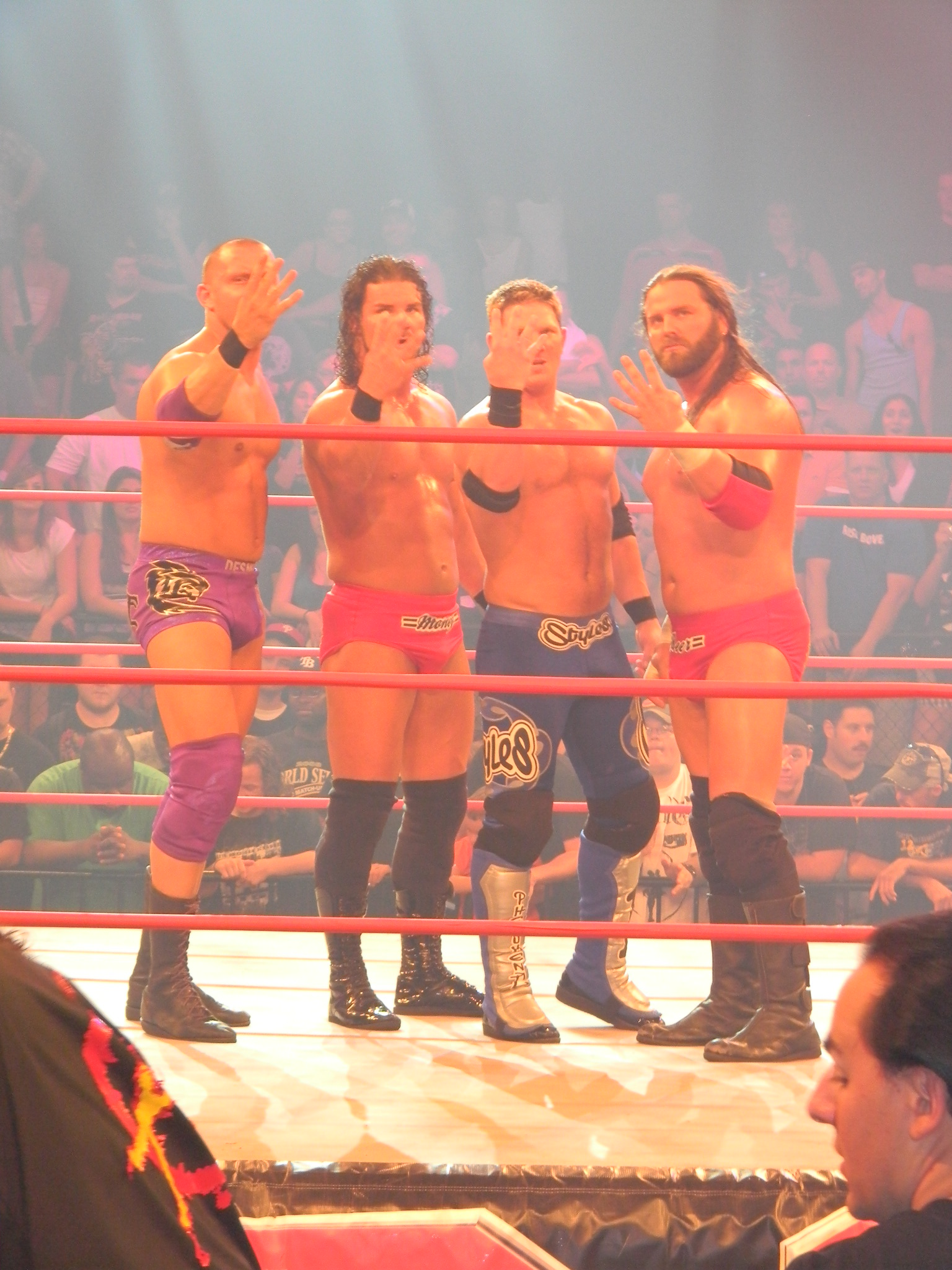
Fourtune hopefuls in May 2010: (from left to right) Desmond Wolfe, Robert Roode, Styles, and James Storm

With these shortcomings, Flair adopted Kazarian as his newest protégé, thus causing Styles to become jealous and tried to impress his mentor, but after failing to defeat Jay Lethal, Flair ordered him to "go home". At Slammiversary VIII on June 13, Styles attempted to win Flair back by defeating Lethal, but lost again. On the following episode of Impact!, Flair, who had aligned himself with Styles, Desmond Wolfe, Kazarian, Robert Roode and James Storm, reformed the Four Horsemen under the new name Fourtune, stating that each of them would have to earn their spots in the group. At Victory Road on July 11, Styles and Kazarian earned their spots by defeating Samoa Joe and Rob Terry due to outside interference from Desmond Wolfe. On the July 22 episode of Impact!, Styles defeated Terry to win the Global Championship (formerly the Legends Championship) for the second time. The following week on Impact!, Styles renamed the title the TNA Television Championship. Fourtune (soon renamed Fortune) then feuded with EV 2.0 and Styles defeated EV 2.0 leader Tommy Dreamer in a non-title "I Quit" match at No Surrender on September 5, although Fortune were defeated in a Lethal Lockdown match by EV 2.0 at Bound for Glory on October 10. On the following episode of Impact!, Fortune formed an alliance with Hulk Hogan and Eric Bischoff's new stable, Immortal. At Turning Point on November 7, Fortune defeated EV 2.0 in a ten-man tag team match and, as a result, EV 2.0's Sabu was released from TNA. The following month at Final Resolution on December 5, Styles lost the Television Championship to Douglas Williams, who had turned on Fortune. On the February 3, 2011 episode of Impact!, Fortune turned face by attacking Immortal, when they interfered in a TNA World Heavyweight Championship match between Mr. Anderson and Jeff Hardy. Flair, who did not take part in Fortune's turn due to an injury, returned on the February 17 episode of Impact!, turning on Fortune during a match between Styles and Matt Hardy and jumping to Immortal. Styles faced Flair and Hardy in a three-way street fight match on the March 10 episode of Impact!, where Styles was pinned by his former mentor, with assistance from Hardy. At Victory Road on March 13, Styles defeated Hardy in a singles match, despite interference from Flair.

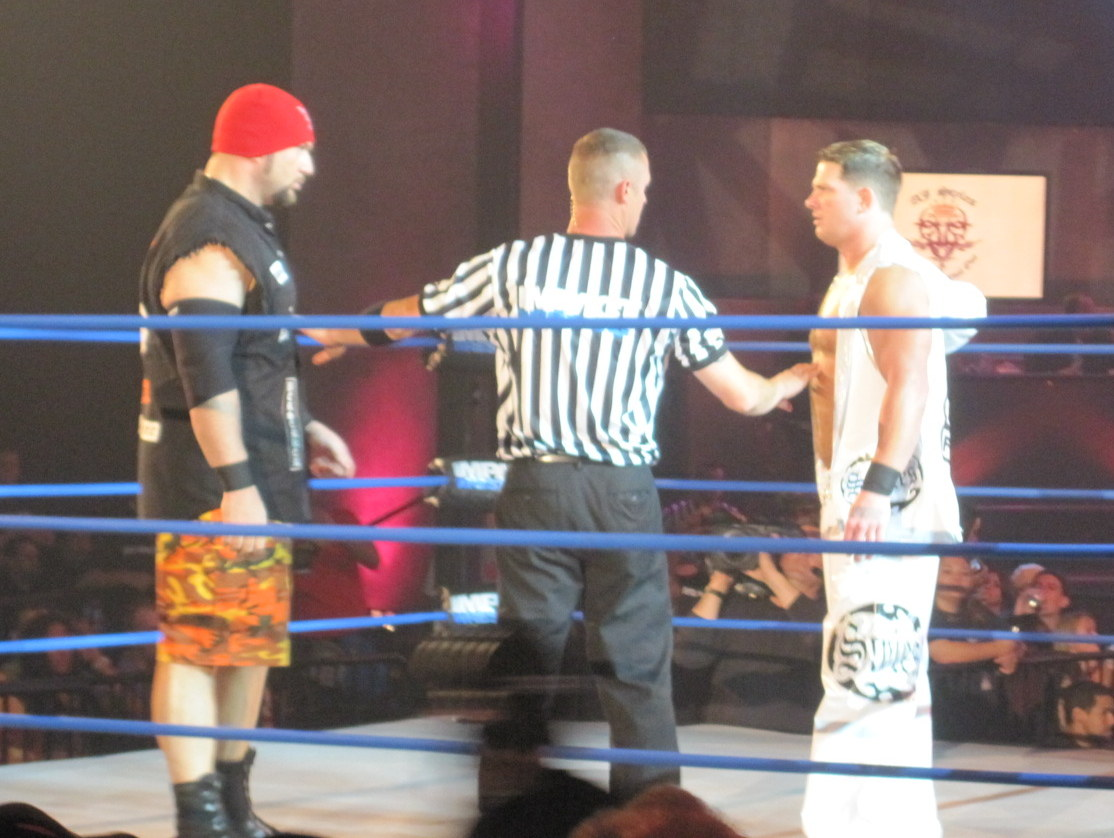
Styles facing Bully Ray at Slammiversary IX in June 2011

On the following episode of Impact!, Styles was sidelined with a storyline injury after Flair helped Bully Ray perform a powerbomb on him off the entrance stage through a table. Styles made his return on April 17 at Lockdown, attacking Bully Ray and helping Fortune defeat Immortal. He then feuded with Tommy Dreamer, who joined Immortal to save his job; Ray cost Styles his match against Dreamer at Sacrifice on May 15 by hitting him with a chain. On the May 26 episode of the newly rebranded Impact Wrestling, Styles and Daniels defeated Ray and Dreamer in a no disqualification street fight match, with Styles pinning Dreamer to avenge his loss at Sacrifice. The feud ended at Slammiversary IX on June 12, where Ray defeated Styles in a Last Man Standing match. Styles then defeated fellow Fortune member Christopher Daniels in the main event of Destination X on July 10. After weeks of asking for a rematch, Styles finally granted Daniels one on the September 1 episode of Impact Wrestling, where Daniels won and refused to shake hands with Styles. At Bound for Glory on October 16, Styles defeated Daniels in an "I Quit" match. After defeating Daniels again on the November 10 episode of Impact Wrestling, Styles entered into a feud with TNA World Heavyweight Champion Bobby Roode, failing to capture the championship at Turning Point on November 13, tying him in an Iron-Man Match at Final Resolution on December 11, but losing the sudden-death tie-breaker on the following Impact Wrestling. During the following episodes of Impact Wrestling, Styles and Kazarian, the last two members of Fortune, made it to the finals of the Wild Card Tournament. During the final match against Magnus and Samoa Joe on the January 5, 2012, episode of Impact Wrestling, Kazarian abandoned Styles and aligned himself with Christopher Daniels, effectively ending Fortune.

==== Final storylines (2012–2014) ====
In 2012, Styles feuded with the team of Kazarian and Daniels, being defeated by Kazarian at Against All Odds On the March 3 episode of Impact Wrestling, Kazarian defeated Styles in a gauntlet match; had Styles been successful, Kazarian would have to explain his alliance with Daniels. but defeating them at Victory Road in a tag team match with Mr. Anderson and at Lockdown on April 15, where the two duos were on opposing teams in the annual Lethal Lockdown match.

TNA booked a storyline where Kazarian and Daniels had a series of photographs insinuating a relationship between Styles and TNA president Dixie Carter, but later evolved into a storyline where he and Carter were helping an addicted pregnant woman named Claire Lynch. Lynch made appearances with TNA, claiming Styles was the father of an unborn baby, but the feud was cancelled since it was critically panned, being awarded by WrestleCrap with the Gooker Award, a recognition to the worst of the year. During the Claire Lynch storyline, Styles would win the TNA World Tag Team Championship with Kurt Angle from Daniels and Kazarian at Slammiversary, but lost it to them the following week. Styles also defeated Daniels in a Last Man Standing match at Destination X, At No Surrender and Bound for Glory, Styles and Angle unsuccessfully challenged Daniels and Kazarian for the TNA World Tag Team Championship. On December 9 at Final Resolution, Styles was defeated by Christopher Daniels in what was billed as their "final match".

Beginning in February 2013, TNA began airing videos at Styles' home interviewing his wife, a friend, and even attempting to interview Styles himself before he angrily forced them to leave. Styles, now sporting a beard, unkempt hair, and all-black attire, returned to TNA with the Calf Killer submission hold as his new finisher, which he used to defeat James Storm in his first match back. Styles, who remained silent in the following weeks, began feuding with Kurt Angle after refusing to tell Angle whether or not he was with the Aces & Eights stable. His new gimmick was nicknamed "The Lone Wolf", since he rejected joining Aces & Eights. At Slammiversary XI on June 2, Styles was defeated by Angle in a singles match, but he defeated him in a rematch to earn the final spot in the 2013 Bound for Glory Series.

Styles won the 2013 Bound For Glory Series, winning a title match for the TNA World Heavyweight Championship at Bound for Glory. In the weeks leading up to Bound for Glory, Styles continued to appear on Impact Wrestling, despite not having a contract with the company, but he would defeat Bully Ray at Bound for Glory, to win his second championship. Styles made his first televised title defense on the following episode of Impact Wrestling, defeating Ray in a rematch after interference from Mr. Anderson, after which he refused Carter's new contract offer and walked out of TNA with the title. On October 29, TNA vacated the TNA World Heavyweight Championship. Styles returned to TNA to face the new World champion Magnus in a title unification match, winning Magnus to unify both titles in what would be Styles' final match with TNA. On December 8, it was reported that contract negotiations between Styles and TNA had broken down and that Styles would be leaving the promotion, ending his near twelve-year association with the company. According to Styles he left the promotion since they made him an offer which reduced his salary about 60%.

=== Mexican and Japanese promotions (2006–2013) ===
During his stay in TNA, Styles worked in various Japanese and Mexican promotions due to a partnership with TNA. On September 17, 2006, at Verano de Escándalo, Styles made his debut for Mexican promotion AAA, as part of a cross promotion deal between TNA and AAA. Team TNA (Styles, Homicide, Low Ki, and Samoa Joe) defeated Vipers Revolution (Abismo Negro, Charly Manson, Electroshock and Histeria) in a semi-final tournament match then later defeated The Mexican Powers (Crazy Boy, Joe Líder and Juventud Guerrera) in the finals. On December 20, 2007, as part of TNA's working relationship with the Inoki Genome Federation (IGF), Styles competed in the promotion's third event, defeating fellow TNA star Senshi.

During a partnership between TNA and New Japan Pro Wrestling (NJPW), Styles made four appearances for NJPW in 2008, starting on January 4 at Wrestle Kingdom II, where Styles teamed with Christian Cage and Petey Williams to defeat RISE (Milano Collection AT, Minoru and Prince Devitt) in a six-man tag team match. On February 17, Styles lost to Hiroshi Tanahashi on Day 8 of New Japan's ISM Tour. On August 15, Styles teamed with Shinjiro Otani to face Kurt Angle and Masahiro Chono on Day 5 of New Japan's G1 Climax – Heroes of Supremacy event, in a losing effort. The following day on Day 6 of New Japan's G1 Climax – Heroes of Supremacy show, Styles teamed with Tanahashi to face the team of Kurt Angle and Shinsuke Nakamura, again in a losing effort.

On July 26, 2008, Styles made his debut for Consejo Mundial de Lucha Libre (CMLL), taking part in the promotion's last annual 16-man elimination International Gran Prix tournament, representing Team International. Styles would defeat Rey Bucanero of Team Mexico in his first match, but would later be eliminated from the tournament by Último Guerrero. Guerrero went on to lose to Team International member Alex Shelley later in the night, with Shelley winning the tournament for Team International.

Styles returned to AAA on December 16, 2011, at Guerra de Titanes, as part of the TNA invasion storyline. He faced El Mesías in a match to earn a shot at the AAA World Heavyweight Championship, but was unsuccessful. On November 3, 2013, Styles would once again return to AAA, this time to successfully defend the TNA World Heavyweight Championship (which had been vacated by TNA just days before) in a rematch against El Mesías. On November 16, 2013, Styles made his debut for Japanese promotion Wrestle-1, successfully defending the TNA World Heavyweight Championship against Seiya Sanada.

=== Return to ROH (2014–2016) ===
Styles defeated Roderick Strong in his return match on the January 4, 2014, taping of Ring of Honor Wrestling, and picked up victories over Jay Lethal at the 12th Anniversary Show and Chris Hero at the Flyin' High event. At All Star Extravaganza VII, he became the number one contender for the ROH World Championship by winning a four-way match involving Adam Cole, Michael Elgin and Roderick Strong, but he unsuccessfully challenged champion Jay Lethal at Final Battle. Styles made his final independent appearance before he began working for WWE at ROH's TV tapings in Duluth, Georgia, on January 23, 2016. At the tapings, Styles was interrupted by Jay Lethal and The House of Truth, followed by Roderick Strong. An ensuing brawl saw Styles' former Bullet Club stablemates Doc Gallows, Karl Anderson, and The Young Bucks (who had fired Styles from the stable just over two weeks prior) assist him against various members of the ROH roster. At the end of the show, Styles proceeded to join Bullet Club in a group hug, mirroring the famous 1996 WWF Madison Square Garden "Curtain Call".

=== Second return to the independent circuit (2014–2016) ===
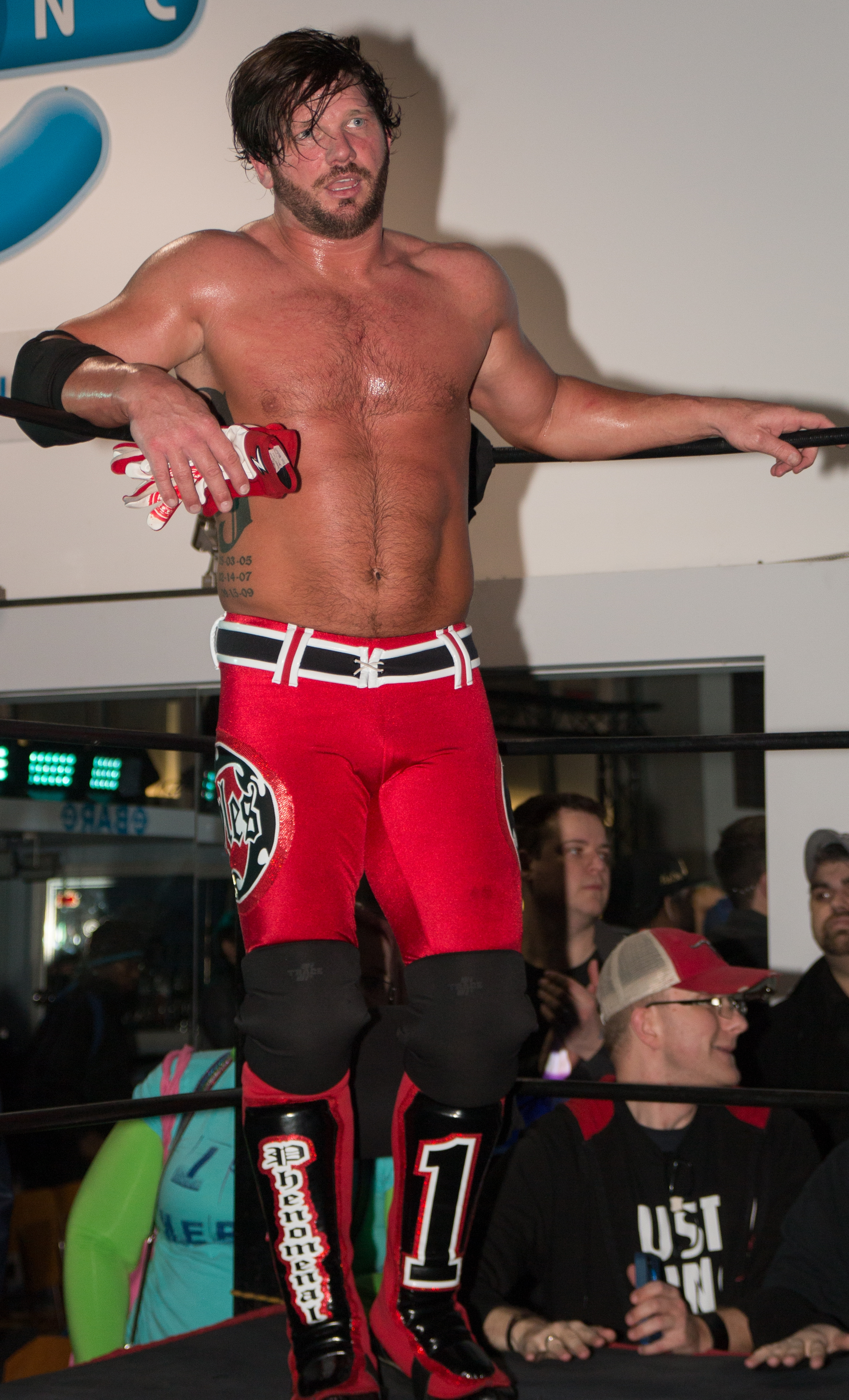
Styles at a Smash Wrestling independent show in January 2014

Following his departure from TNA, Styles would begin taking independent bookings. During his second run on the independent circuit, he competed in various countries around the world, most notably England, where he won Revolution Pro Wrestling's British Heavyweight Championship. On March 1, 2014, Styles made an appearance for English promotion Preston City Wrestling, losing to British wrestler Lionheart in the main event. Following the match, Styles gave Lionheart the Styles Clash, during which Lionheart improperly tucked his chin, resulting in him landing on top of his head and legitimately breaking his neck.

He also defended the NJPW's IWGP Heavyweight Championship on independent promotions: against Justin Gabriel at House of Glory High Intensity 4 He also participated in two independent tournaments: Pro Wrestling Guerrilla's Battle of Los Angeles and Chikara's 2015 King of Trios with The Young Bucks, representing Bullet Club. On January 16, Styles returned to Revolution Pro Wrestling in London, England, losing the RPW British Heavyweight Championship to Zack Sabre Jr..

=== New Japan Pro-Wrestling (2014–2016) ===
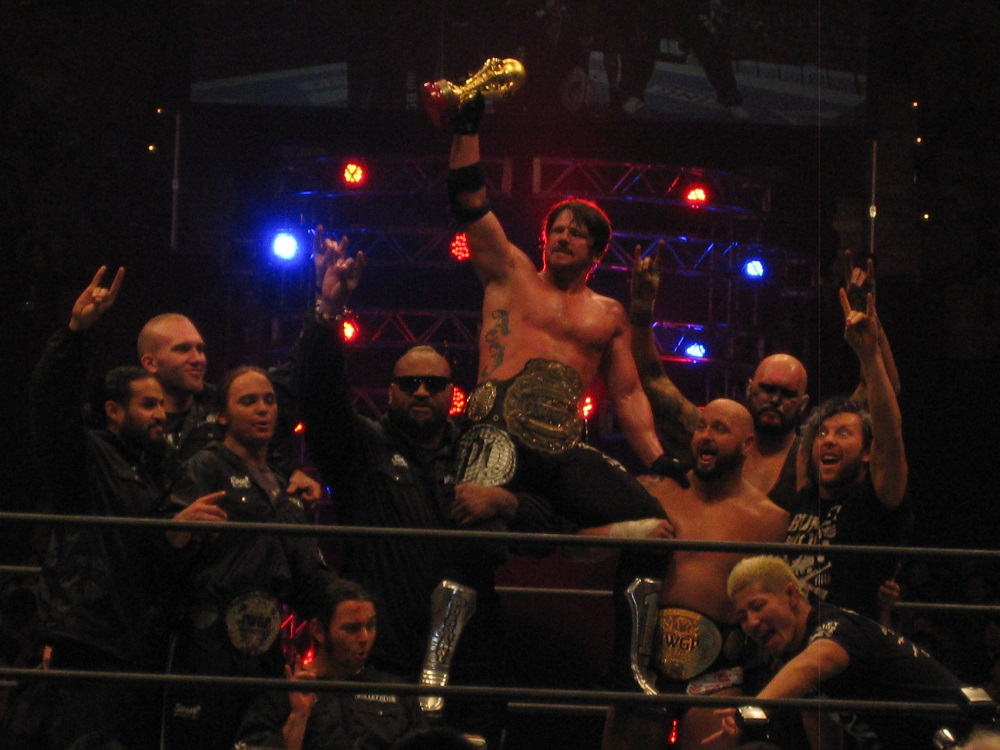
Styles (center, being hoisted) celebrates with Bullet Club after winning the IWGP Heavyweight Championship in February 2015

For the first time since the TNA-NJPW partnership in 2008, on March 27, 2014, it was reported that Styles would return to New Japan Pro-Wrestling and had signed a contract with the company. Styles appeared at Invasion Attack, where he attacked IWGP Heavyweight Champion Kazuchika Okada and revealed as the new member of Bullet Club. Following Invasion Attack, with Styles still working a full schedule on the American independent circuit and only booked to work NJPW's larger events, Karl Anderson was positioned as the new leader of Bullet Club. However, Styles was considered the leader of the Ring of Honor (ROH) version of Bullet Club, a role which was also given to him by NJPW by the end of 2015. Styles defeated Okada for the title at Wrestling Dontaku. With this victory, Styles became the sixth gaijin (non-Japanese) champion in the title's history and the first American champion since Brock Lesnar in 2005. On May 17, Styles made his first successful title defense in a three-way match with Okada and Michael Elgin at the NJPW/ROH co-produced War of the Worlds event in New York City. On May 25 at Back to the Yokohama Arena, Styles defeated Okada for his second successful title defense. Styles suffered his first loss in NJPW on July 21, when he was defeated by Okada in his first match in the 2014 G1 Climax tournament. Out of his nine remaining matches in the tournament, Styles lost only one, but failed to advance to the finals due to his loss against Okada in the head-to-head match. On October 13 at King of Pro-Wrestling, Styles lost the IWGP Heavyweight Championship to Hiroshi Tanahashi in his third defense.

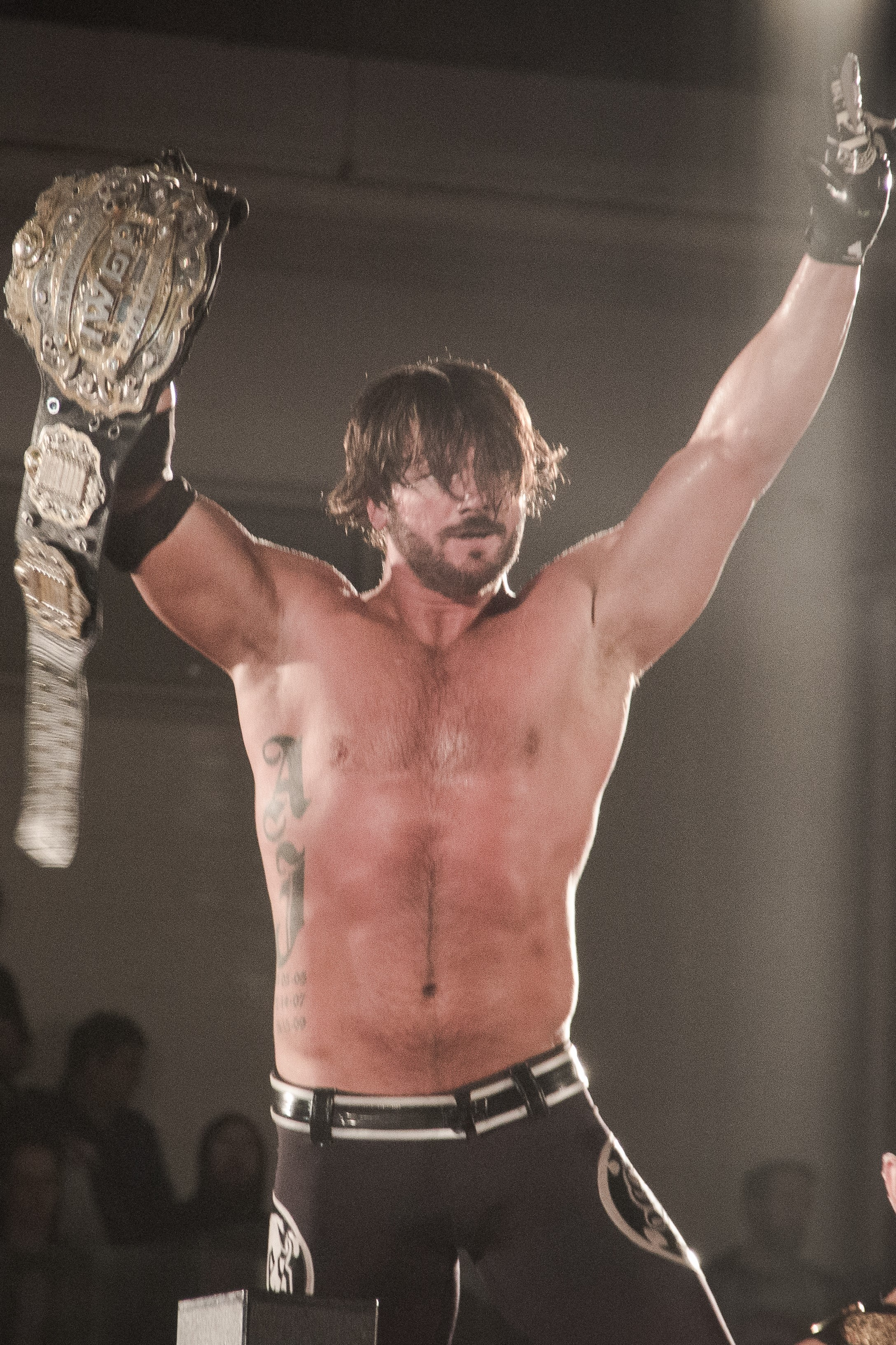
Styles as the IWGP Heavyweight Champion in May 2014

On November 8 at Power Struggle, Styles defeated Yoshitatsu with help from Jarrett and after the match was confronted by Tetsuya Naito. During the match, Yoshitatsu legitimately broke his neck on a botched Styles Clash in which he tucked his head, leading to NJPW pushing Styles as a "killer" and the Styles Clash as a controversial maneuver. Later in the month, Styles entered the 2014 World Tag League, alongside Yujiro Takahashi. Despite a win over reigning IWGP Tag Team Champions and Bullet Club stablemates Doc Gallows and Karl Anderson, they failed to advance from their block with a record of four wins and three losses after a loss to Okada and Yoshi-Hashi on the final day. Styles defeated Naito on January 4, 2015, at Wrestle Kingdom 9 in Tokyo Dome. Two days later, Styles inserted himself back into the IWGP Heavyweight Championship picture, when he pinned Tanahashi in an eight-man tag team match, setting up a title match between the two at The New Beginning in Osaka. On February 11, Styles defeated Tanahashi to win the IWGP Heavyweight Championship for the second time. Styles made his first title defense on April 5 at Invasion Attack, where he defeated 2015 New Japan Cup winner Kota Ibushi. His five-month reign ended in his second defense on July 5 at Dominion 7.5 in Osaka-jo Hall, where he was defeated by Okada. From July 20 to August 14, Styles took part in the 2015 G1 Climax. Styles entered the final day with a chance to advance from his block, but a loss against Tanahashi cost him a spot in the finals, giving him a record of six wins and three losses. On October 12 at King of Pro-Wrestling, Styles received a rematch for the IWGP Heavyweight Championship, but was again defeated by Okada.

In November, Styles entered the IWGP Intercontinental Championship picture by challenging Shinsuke Nakamura to a title match. Later that month, Styles was forced to pull out of the 2015 World Tag League, where he teamed with Takahashi, after experiencing a back injury. Styles returned to the NJPW ring on January 4, 2016, at Wrestle Kingdom 10 in Tokyo Dome, where he unsuccessfully challenged Nakamura for the IWGP Intercontinental Championship. Hours after Styles' Wrestle Kingdom 10 match, it was reported that Styles had given his notice to NJPW on the morning of January 4, leaving the promotion for WWE. The following day, Styles made his final appearance for NJPW, where the rest of Bullet Club turned on him with Kenny Omega becoming the stable's new leader.

=== WWE (2016–present) ===
==== Feud with John Cena (2016–2017) ====
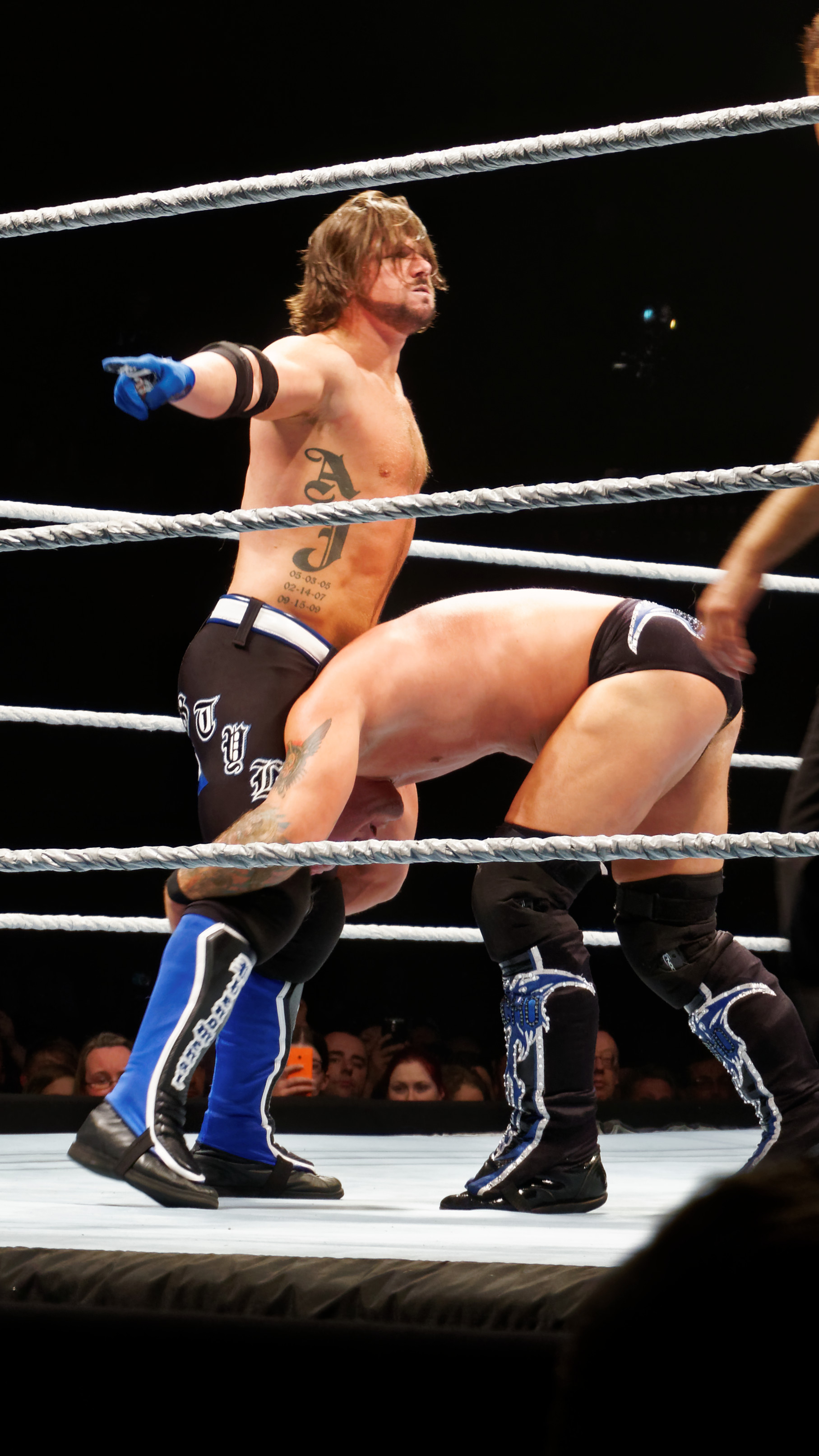
Styles setting up for a Styles Clash on Chris Jericho at a house show in April 2016

After weeks of speculation and WWE themselves covering the rumors of Styles leaving NJPW for WWE, on January 20, 2016, it was confirmed that he had signed with WWE. Prior to signing, Styles had also had extensive discussions with TNA and according to them, Styles had agreed to return to the promotion with Bullet Club stablemates Doc Gallows and Karl Anderson, before being offered a "blow-away deal" by WWE. After not being on WWE television since his Metal match in 2002, Styles made his re-debut in WWE on January 24 at the Royal Rumble pay-per-view during the Royal Rumble match for the WWE World Heavyweight Championship, entering at number three. Styles went on to eliminate Curtis Axel and Tyler Breeze, before being eliminated by Kevin Owens, lasting just under 29 minutes in the match. Styles then entered a storyline with Chris Jericho, with the two exchanging victories on both Raw and SmackDown, which ultimately led to an encounter between the two on February 21 at Fastlane, where Styles emerged victorious via submission. After Fastlane, Jericho and Styles formed a tag team, dubbed "Y2AJ", and defeated The New Day (Big E and Kofi Kingston) in two non-title matches. Y2AJ failed to win the WWE Tag Team Championship from them on the March 7 episode of Raw, after which Jericho turned on Styles and attacked him, ending their team. The two subsequently interfered in each other's matches, leading to a match between the two at WrestleMania 32 on April 3, which Styles lost.

He would face Roman Reigns for the WWE World Heavyweight Championship at the Payback and Extreme Rules PPV's, but didn't win the title. Then, he started a feud with John Cena, turning heel in the process. This set up a match between Styles and Cena at Money in the Bank on June 19, which Styles won after interference from The Club. At Battleground on July 24, The Club were defeated by Cena and Enzo Amore and Big Cass in a six-man tag team match after Cena pinned Styles. During the 2016 WWE Draft, Styles was drafted to the SmackDown brand in the first round of picks, being the brand's second pick overall, while Gallows and Anderson were drafted to the Raw brand, splitting up The Club. He faced Cena once more at the SummerSlam pay-per-view on August 21, where he was victorious. After his victory over Cena, Styles claimed himself to be the "new face of WWE" and "the Face That Runs the Place".

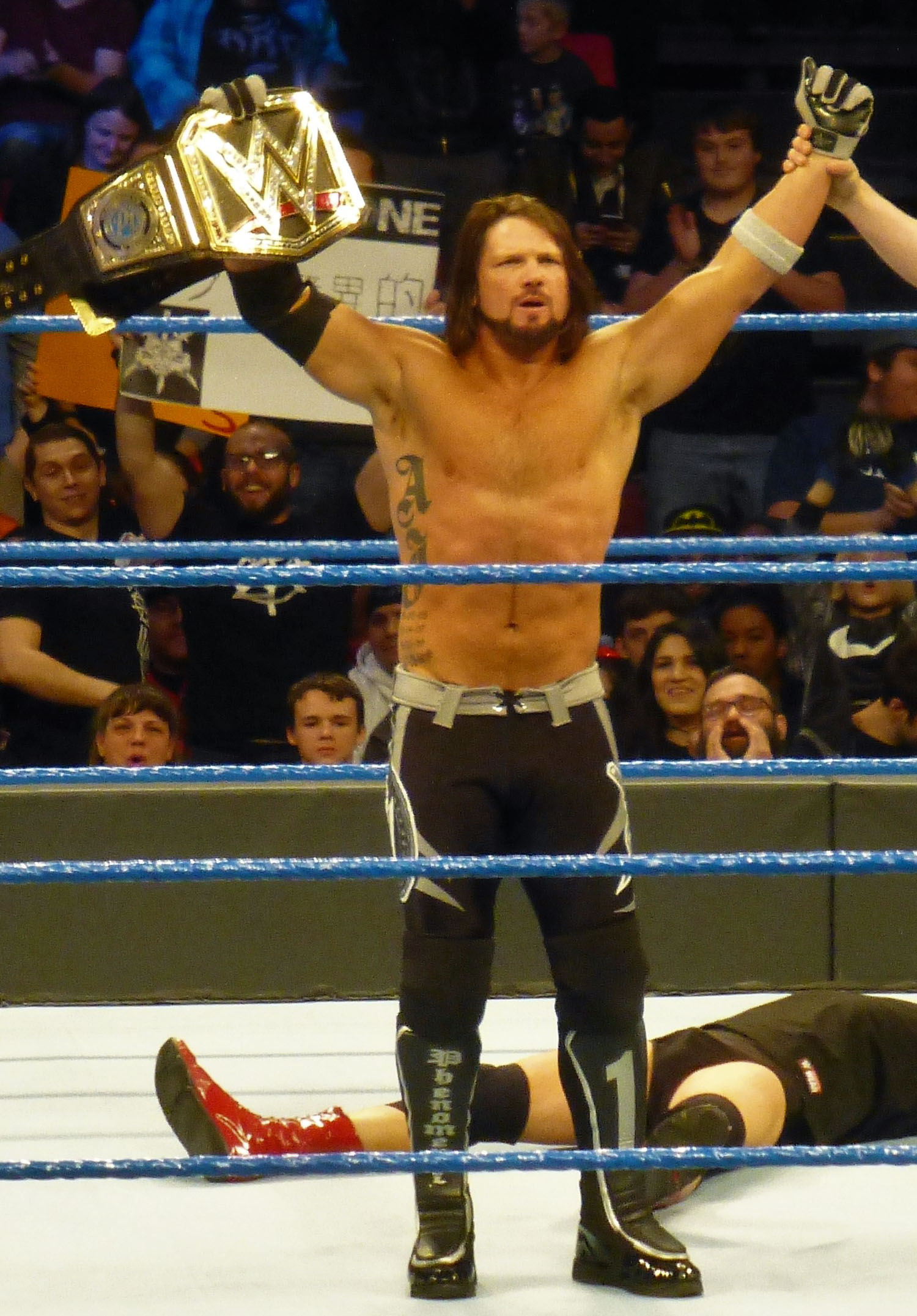
Styles as WWE Champion in December 2016

Due to his victory at SummerSlam, Styles immediately re-entered the renamed WWE World Championship picture and defeated Dean Ambrose at Backlash to win the title. Styles made his first successful title defense against Ambrose in a rematch on the September 27 episode of SmackDown Live after interference from Cena. At No Mercy on October 9, Styles retained the title against Cena and Ambrose in a triple threat match after pinning Cena. At TLC: Tables, Ladders & Chairs on December 4, Styles retained the championship over Ambrose in a Tables, Ladders, and Chairs match after James Ellsworth interfered and pushed Ambrose off a ladder and through several tables. Styles then resumed his feud with Cena leading into the Royal Rumble on January 29, 2017, where Styles was defeated for the championship, ending his reign at 140 days.

On February 12 at Elimination Chamber, Styles competed in an Elimination Chamber match against Cena, Baron Corbin, Wyatt, Ambrose and The Miz for the WWE Championship, which Wyatt won. On the following episode of SmackDown Live, Styles failed to regain the title from Wyatt in a triple threat match also involving Cena. In March, Styles began a feud with SmackDown Commissioner Shane McMahon, due to Styles' frustration of being unable to reclaim the WWE Championship. At WrestleMania 33 on April 2, Styles defeated McMahon. On the following episode of SmackDown Live, Styles shook hands with McMahon, turning face in the process.

On the April 11 episode of SmackDown Live, Styles defeated Corbin and Sami Zayn to become the number one contender for the United States Championship at Backlash on May 21, but lost his match for the title against Kevin Owens by countout. After Styles again became the number one contender to Owens' championship, a title match was set for Battleground. However, on July 7, two weeks before the pay-per-view, Styles defeated Owens during a house show at Madison Square Garden to capture the United States Championship for the first time in his career. At Battleground on July 23, Styles lost the title back to Owens, but regained it two days later on SmackDown Live in a triple threat match also involving a returning Chris Jericho. At SummerSlam on August 20, Styles retained the title against Owens with Shane McMahon as the special guest referee. Styles once again defeated Owens two days later on SmackDown Live to end the feud. In September, he began a feud with Tye Dillinger and Baron Corbin, leading to a triple threat match at Hell in a Cell on October 8, where Styles lost the title to Corbin who pinned Dillinger, ending his reign at 75 days. Two days later on SmackDown Live, Styles failed to regain the title from Corbin.

==== Year-long WWE Championship reign (2017–2018) ====
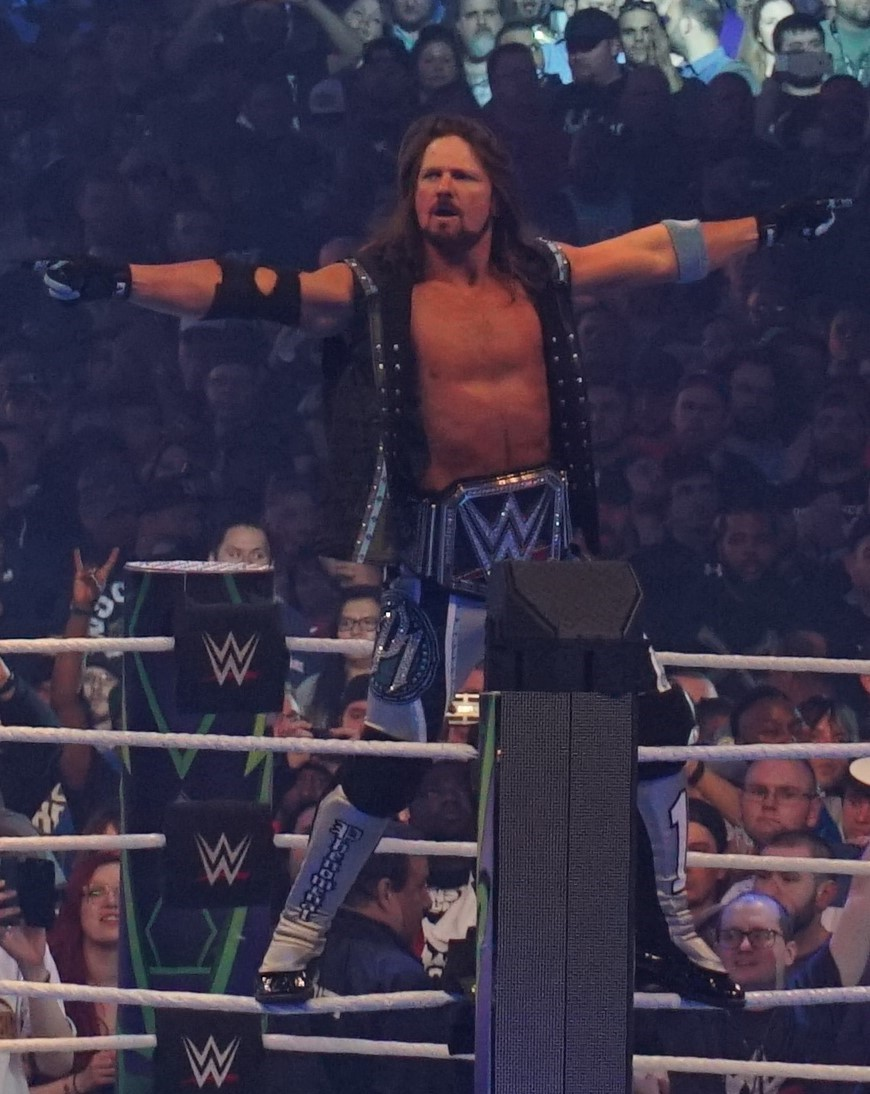
Styles as WWE Champion at WrestleMania 34 in April 2018

On the October 17 episode of SmackDown Live, Styles began a rivalry with then WWE Champion Jinder Mahal, confronting and attacking him. On October 22, Styles appeared at Raw's exclusive event TLC: Tables, Ladders & Chairs, competing against Finn Bálor due to Bálor's original opponent Bray Wyatt not being cleared to compete, where he was defeated by Bálor. On the November 7 episode of SmackDown Live in Manchester, England, Styles defeated Mahal to win the WWE Championship for the second time in what marked the first time the title changed hands on SmackDown since September 2003, becoming recognized by WWE as the first titleholder crowned outside of North America (Antonio Inoki had won the title in Japan in 1979, but this reign is unrecognized by WWE). With the win, Styles replaced Mahal in the champion vs. champion match at Survivor Series against Universal Champion Brock Lesnar on November 19, but lost. At Clash of Champions on December 17, Styles defeated Mahal via submission in his first title defense. His next feud came against Kevin Owens and Sami Zayn, whom he lost back-to-back matches to due to interference, leading to a handicap championship match at the Royal Rumble on January 28, 2018, which Styles won. Styles retained the title against Owens, Zayn, John Cena, Baron Corbin, and Dolph Ziggler in a six-pack challenge at Fastlane on March 11.

At WrestleMania 34 on April 8, Styles successfully defended the title against Royal Rumble winner Shinsuke Nakamura. After the match, however, Styles was subjected to a classless assault by Nakamura. This led to a rematch between the two on April 27 at the Greatest Royal Rumble, where they fought to a double countout, but Styles retained the title. Another rematch was made for Backlash on May 6 with a no disqualification stipulation, where Styles and Nakamura fought to a no contest after low blowing each other, again retaining the title. Their feud ended at Money in the Bank on June 17, where Styles defeated Nakamura to retain the WWE Championship in a Last Man Standing match. After retaining the title against Rusev at Extreme Rules on July 15, Styles became the longest-reigning WWE Champion in SmackDown history on August 14, surpassing the 280-day record set by John "Bradshaw" Layfield (JBL).

On the July 24 episode of SmackDown Live, Styles started a feud with Samoa Joe, after he was attacked by Joe. Styles retained the title at SummerSlam on August 19, despite losing via disqualification. Styles' and Joe's rivalry continued over Styles' wife, Wendy, where Joe claimed he would defeat Styles and become the "new daddy", leading to a rematch at Hell in a Cell on September 16, which Styles won in controversial fashion to retain the title; Styles submitted to Joe during a roll-up, however, the referee did not see the submission and counted the pin, allowing Styles to retain the title. Styles retained the title against Joe at Super Show-Down on October 6 by submission and Crown Jewel on November 2. On November 7, Styles surpassed the 365-day mark of his title reign, becoming the 8th man to have held the WWE Championship for a continuous reign of a full year. On the November 13 episode of SmackDown Live, Styles lost the WWE Championship to Bryan, ending his reign at 371 days.

==== Return of The O.C. (2019–2020) ====
At Royal Rumble on January 27, 2019, Styles once again failed to win the title, after a returning Rowan attacked Styles when the referee was incapacitated and allowed Bryan to retain the title. He took part in the Elimination Chamber match at the eponymous event on February 17, but was eliminated by Randy Orton. Styles and Orton then started making disparaging comments about one another, starting a feud between the two. At Fastlane on March 10, after Orton interrupted Elias, Styles hit Orton with a Phenomenal Forearm out of nowhere. This led to a confrontation between the two on the March 12 episode of SmackDown Live, in which Styles challenged Orton to a match at WrestleMania 35. At WrestleMania on April 7, Styles defeated Orton. The next day, it was reported that Styles had an injury during his match with Orton and was sent home to recover. Styles did not appear on the SmackDown Live following WrestleMania, and it was reported to be a hip injury.

On April 15, Styles was drafted to the Raw brand as part of the Superstar Shake-up. The following week on Raw, chief executive officer Triple H scheduled two triple threat matches, with the winners facing each other to determine the next contender against Seth Rollins for the Universal Championship. Styles defeated fellow draftees Rey Mysterio and Samoa Joe in the triple threat match and then defeated Baron Corbin to earn a Universal Championship match against Seth Rollins at Money in the Bank. He then began a slow heel turn as he became more aggressive in the ring, walked out on Rollins in a tag team match, and criticized Luke Gallows and Karl Anderson (who had also moved back to Raw) when they lost a match for being overconfident. At the event on May 19, Styles failed to win the title from Rollins.

In June, Styles aligned again with Gallows and Anderson under the name "The O.C." ("Original Club"), turning heel, and defeating Ricochet at Extreme Rules to win the United States Championship for a third time. At SummerSlam on August 11, Styles successfully retained the title against Ricochet. Styles then retained his title against Cedric Alexander at Clash of Champions on September 15 and Humberto Carrillo at Crown Jewel on October 31. At Survivor Series on November 24, Styles was defeated by NXT North American Champion Roderick Strong in an interbrand triple-threat match also involving Intercontinental Champion Shinsuke Nakamura. On the November 25 episode of Raw, Styles lost the title to Rey Mysterio, ending his reign at 134 days.

Starting 2020, Styles began a feud with The Undertaker when he was defeated at Super ShowDown in a gauntlet match for the Tuwaiq Trophy and lost against Aleister Black at Elimination Chamber after interference from The Undertaker. Styles and The Undertaker wrestled at WrestleMania 36, where Styles was defeated in the main event of Night 1 in a Boneyard match. On April 15, both Anderson and Gallows were released from their WWE contracts as part of budget cuts stemming from the COVID-19 pandemic, disbanding The O.C.

==== Alliance with Omos (2020–2021) ====
After a brief hiatus, Styles returned on the May 4 episode of Raw, winning a gauntlet match for a spot in the Money in the Bank ladder match at Money in the Bank on May 10, where he failed to capture the briefcase. On the May 22 episode of SmackDown, Styles was traded to the brand and entered the Intercontinental Championship tournament. He defeated Shinsuke Nakamura in the first round, and earned a bye to the finals after his scheduled opponent Elias was unable to compete. On the June 12 episode of SmackDown, Styles defeated Daniel Bryan to win the Intercontinental Championship for the first time. During the following weeks, Styles made successful defenses against the likes of Drew Gulak and Gran Metalik before losing the title to Jeff Hardy on the August 21 episode of SmackDown, ending his reign at 70 days. At Clash of Champions on September 27, Styles failed to regain the title in a triple threat ladder match that was won by Sami Zayn.

As part of the 2020 Draft in October, Styles was drafted back to the Raw brand. On the October 19 episode of Raw, Styles debuted a new bodyguard, Omos. At Survivor Series on November 22, Styles captained Team Raw to a clean sweep victory against Team SmackDown. On the November 30 episode of Raw, Styles defeated Keith Lee and Riddle in a triple threat match to face Drew McIntyre for the WWE Championship at TLC: Tables, Ladders & Chairs on December 20, but he failed to win the title in a TLC match as The Miz unsuccessfully cashed in his Money in the Bank briefcase during the match. At the Royal Rumble on January 31, 2021, Styles entered the Royal Rumble match at number 25, but was eliminated by Braun Strowman. At Elimination Chamber on February 21, Styles competed for the WWE Championship inside the steel structure, eliminating Sheamus, but was the final man eliminated by McIntyre.

On Night 1 of WrestleMania 37 on April 10, Styles and Omos defeated The New Day (Kofi Kingston and Xavier Woods) to win the Raw Tag Team Championship, becoming the twenty-second WWE Grand Slam Champion, and the first to achieve both the WWE and TNA/Impact Grand Slam. They lost the titles to RK-Bro at SummerSlam, ending their reign at 133 days. On October 21, at Crown Jewel, Styles and Omos failed to regain the titles from RK-Bro. On the December 20 episode of Raw, after failing to win matches over the following weeks, Styles was attacked by Omos, ending their partnership and turning face.

==== The O.C. second reunion (2022–2023) ====
At Royal Rumble on January 29, 2022, Styles entered at number one and eliminated six wrestlers before being eliminated by Madcap Moss. Styles failed to win the WWE Championship at Elimination Chamber on February 19, inside the namesake structure, after being eliminated by eventual winner Brock Lesnar. On the February 28 episode of Raw, Styles accepted an open challenge from Edge for a match at WrestleMania 38, which resulted in him being attacked by Edge afterwards. On Night 2 of WrestleMania on April 3, Styles lost to Edge following a distraction from Damian Priest. At WrestleMania Backlash on May 8, Styles again lost to Edge after interference from Rhea Ripley. Styles then aligned himself with former Bullet Club stablemate Finn Bálor and Liv Morgan and challenged the newly formed faction called The Judgment Day, consisting of Edge, Priest and Ripley to a six-person mixed tag team match at Hell In a Cell on June 5, which The Judgment Day won. On June 19, Styles appeared via video message at Impact Wrestling's Slammiversary, congratulating Impact on their 20-year anniversary.

On the July 4 episode of Raw, Styles defeated The Miz and was attacked by him and Ciampa after the match, starting a feud between them. At SummerSlam on July 30, Styles distracted Miz during his match against Logan Paul by attacking Ciampa, causing him to lose. On the August 1 episode of Raw, Styles defeated Miz and Mustafa Ali in a triple threat match but lost to Ciampa later that night, failing to earn an opportunity at the United States Championship. On the following episode of Raw, Styles defeated The Miz in a no disqualification match to end their feud. On the August 15 episode of Raw, he faced Bobby Lashley for the United States Championship in a losing effort.

In the following weeks, Styles would rekindle his feud with The Judgment Day (which now included Bàlor and Dominik Mysterio), turning down numerous offers by Bàlor to join them. On the October 10 episode of Raw, Styles feigned joining The Judgment Day, leading to Luke Gallows and Karl Anderson returning to WWE to aid Styles in attacking them, reforming The O.C.. At Crown Jewel on November 5, The O.C. lost to The Judgment Day after interference from Ripley. Three weeks later at Survivor Series on November 26, Styles defeated Bálor. On the following episode of Raw, The O.C. were defeated by The Judgment Day in an eight-person mixed tag team match to end their feud. On December 29, Styles suffered a legitimate broken ankle during a house show, and would be out of action though the injury would not require surgery.

As part of the 2023 WWE Draft, Styles was drafted to the SmackDown brand. On the May 12 episode of SmackDown, Styles won the right to compete for the newly established World Heavyweight Championship at Night of Champions by first defeating Edge and Rey Mysterio in a triple threat match, and then defeating Bobby Lashley, who had won a similar triple threat match. On May 27, at Night of Champions, Styles lost to Seth Rollins in a match to crown the inaugural World Heavyweight Champion. After a brief feud with Karrion Kross, Styles feuded with The Bloodline, losing to Solo Sikoa on the September 1 episode of SmackDown after interference from Jimmy Uso. John Cena came to his aid and set up a tag team match between him and Styles against Uso and Sikoa for Fastlane, however, Styles was taken out by Sikoa backstage on the September 22 episode of SmackDown, removing him from the match. He was replaced by LA Knight the following week.

==== Championship pursuits (2023–2024) ====
After a two-month hiatus, Styles returned on the December 15 episode of SmackDown, assisting Knight and Randy Orton in fending off The Bloodline before attacking Knight. The following week on SmackDown, The O.C. greeted Styles but he blew them off for not coming to his aid when he was taken out by The Bloodline. At Royal Rumble on January 27, 2024, Styles failed to capture the Undisputed WWE Universal Championship from Roman Reigns in a fatal four-way match also involving Knight and Orton. On the February 9 episode of SmackDown, Styles lost to Drew McIntyre in a qualifying match for the Elimination Chamber match following a distraction from Knight. At the eponymous event on February 24, Styles would interfere in the Elimination Chamber match by attacking Knight with a chair and performing a Styles Clash on him with it, turning heel for the first time since December 2021. On the March 15 episode of SmackDown, Styles was challenged by Knight to a match at WrestleMania XL, which Styles accepted. On Night 2 of WrestleMania XL on April 7, Styles lost to Knight.

On the following episode of SmackDown, Styles participated in the Undisputed WWE Championship Eliminator Tournament, defeating Kevin Owens and Rey Mysterio in the semifinals. Styles defeated Knight on the April 19 episode of SmackDown to end their feud and challenge Cody Rhodes for the Undisputed WWE Championship at Backlash France. At the event on May 4, Styles failed to win the title, but the match received a 5-star rating from Dave Meltzer, marking his second 5-star rated match. On the May 31 episode of SmackDown, Styles delivered an apparent retirement speech and called Rhodes out to the ring, which was revealed to be a ruse after he attacked Rhodes and realigned with Gallows and Anderson. On the June 7 episode of SmackDown, Rhodes challenged Styles to an "I Quit" match for the championship at Clash at the Castle: Scotland. At the event on June 15, Styles again lost to Rhodes, ending their feud. On July 13, Styles made an appearance for Pro Wrestling Noah, defeating Naomichi Marufuji at NOAH Destination. Styles returned as a face on the October 4 episode of SmackDown, where he was confronted by Carmelo Hayes. During a match between the two that night, Styles suffered an ankle injury, causing Hayes to win the match via referee stoppage. Styles later confirmed that he had suffered a Lisfranc injury.

==== Final feuds and retirement (2025–2026) ====
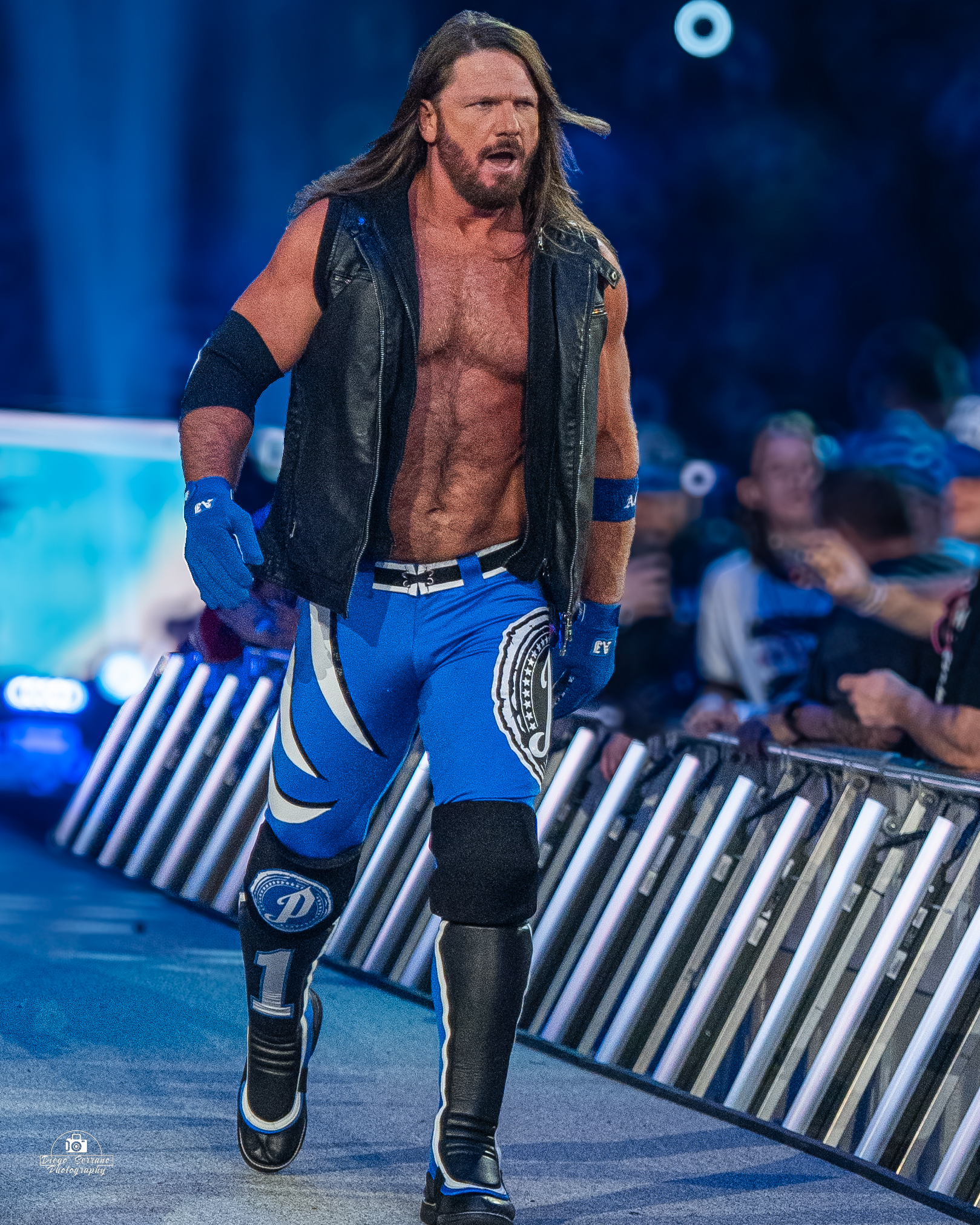
Styles at the Royal Rumble in February 2025

At Royal Rumble on February 1, 2025, Styles made his first appearance since October, entering the titular match at number 21, where he eliminated LA Knight before being eliminated by Logan Paul. Two days later on Raw, Styles was transferred to the Raw brand. At WrestleMania 41, Styles lost to Paul after refusing to use brass knuckles given to him by Karrion Kross.

On July 20, 2025, at TNA Slammiversary, through WWE's partnership with TNA, Styles made his first appearance at a TNA event in eleven years, during which he congratulated the newly crowned TNA X Division Champion Leon Slater. Styles next began feuding with Dominik Mysterio for the Intercontinental Championship, wrestling for the title on Night 1 of SummerSlam on August 2 and the September 1 episode of Raw in Paris, France, but failed to win the title on both occasions.

In an interview with Tokyo Sports on September 26, Styles stated his plans to retire soon, and revealed his intentions to work as a trainer in WWE following his in-ring retirement, though the decision had not yet been finalized. Styles had a last match against John Cena on October 11 at Crown Jewel, where he was defeated. On October 21, he won the World Tag Team Championship with Dragon Lee by defeating Finn Bálor and JD McDonagh of The Judgment Day, but lost it 70 days later to The Usos. Styles made an appearance at the TNA Impact! premiere on AMC on January 17, 2026. At Saturday Night's Main Event XLIII on January 24, Styles defeated Shinsuke Nakamura. On January 26 on Raw, he challenged CM Punk for the World Heavyweight Championship, which ended in a disqualification after Bálor interfered and assaulted Punk.

Styles' final storyline started in 2026, when he feuded with Gunther after the latter had continuously bragged about making Cena submit in his retirement match. The two faced one another on the January 12 episode of Raw, where Gunther submitted, but the referee did not see it, after which Gunther delivered a low blow and a Powerbomb on Styles to win the match. They wrestled a rematch at the Royal Rumble on January 31, 2026, where Styles put his career on the line; Styles lost the match, leading to his retirement from in-ring competition.

==== WWE Hall of Fame and non-wrestling roles (2026–present) ====
On the February 23 episode of Raw, Styles made an appearance near his home town in Atlanta, Georgia and gave a farewell address to the fans, before leaving his trademark gloves and jacket in the ring, officially concluding his 28-year long career. Styles was then met by The Undertaker who revealed that he would be inducted in the WWE Hall of Fame's class of 2026. According to PWInsider, Styles had reached a new deal with WWE to remain with the company in a non-wrestling role. On March 8, Styles stated his new role in WWE would be scouting talent around the world and mentoring talent in NXT. In July 2026, Styles announced that he had a taken a coaching role at the WWE Performance Center.

== Legacy ==
In a 2016 article, Pro Wrestling Torch journalist Michael Moore noted that Styles "has long been regarded as one of the best wrestlers in the world". In November 2012, IGN UK columnist Matt Fowler ranked Styles at number 38 in his top 50 professional wrestlers of all-time list. Luke Winkie of Sports Illustrated listed him as the 46th greatest wrestler of all time in 2016, noting that: "Honestly, in a couple years it wouldn't surprise me if A.J. belongs in the top 20."

Ayub Nouinou, a columnist for The Independent, described him as the "crown jewel" of TNA for more than a decade, before "applying his craft" for NJPW and ROH, among others. Nouinou went on to state that Styles had "established himself as one of the best talents on the planet over the last two years (2014 and 2015)" and noted that pertaining to Styles' 2016 WWE signing "the addition of Styles would have to be considered one of the greatest signings since the turn of the millennium". Finally, Nouinou made the prediction that "Styles can be the superstar that spearheads WWE into a new era". Josh Barnett, a columnist for USA Today, stated in March 2017 that Styles "could be considered the MVP of WWE over the last year". Barnett also added that in 2016 Styles had "some of the WWE's best matches, including multiple matches against John Cena and Roman Reigns", while also noting that he "is considered one of the rare performers who can have a great match with anyone". By late 2021, Philip Lindsey of Bleacher Report wrote that Styles was considered "one of the best in-ring competitors in the world. Many top stars have had some of their most memorable matches opposite this high-flying technician."

Many of Styles' peers have praised him as being one of the greatest in-ring performers. Kurt Angle named him as the best wrestler that he ever wrestled, calling him a "rare breed". Stone Cold Steve Austin dubbed Styles "the best wrestler on two feet", while The Undertaker, whose final match was against Styles, described him as "probably the best in the business... [the] closest to Shawn Michaels that there is." The comparison to Shawn Michaels was also made by renowned professional wrestling promoter and manager Paul Heyman, who stated that: "He's everything that Shawn Michaels, and Bret Hart, and Ric Flair were to their generation and he's updated it. He's evolved their styles to truly be the single most phenomenal in-ring performer I have ever had the honour and the pleasure of watching up close".

== Other media ==
In 2003, ROH released Evolution of a Phenom: The Best of AJ Styles, a DVD which covers Styles from his debut to mid-2003. In 2004, ROH released The Phenomenon Continues: The Best of AJ Styles Vol. 2, a follow-up DVD to the original released in 2003. Also in 2004, TNA released Phenomenal: The Best of A.J. Styles, a DVD covering Styles' best matches. In 2006, ROH released a shoot interview featuring Styles, alongside Christopher Daniels for the promotions "Straight Shootin'" series. In 2007, TNA released Phenomenal: The Best of A.J. Styles Volume 2, a follow-up DVD to the original released in 2004. Also in 2007, Styles was mentioned in the Insane Clown Posse song "Scatterbrain" off their EP Eye of the Storm. In 2008, Styles helped develop the first TNA wrestling video game known as TNA Impact!, which was released the same year on September 9.

In 2009, Styles was featured on MTV's Made trying to help a young high schooler become a professional wrestler alongside Taylor Wilde and The Beautiful People (Angelina Love and Velvet Sky). In 2011, Styles was featured in the music video for country singer Sarah Darling's song "Something to Do with Your Hands". In 2012, Styles and Montell Jordan presented the award for Best Rap/Hip Hop Record of the Year to Lecrae at the 43rd annual GMA Dove Awards. In 2013, ROH released AJ Styles – Styles Clash, a 2-disc DVD featuring Styles' best ROH matches from 2002 to 2005. In 2016, TNA released The Essential AJ Styles Collection, a 4-disc DVD set showcasing Styles' top 30 greatest TNA matches. In 2018, Styles was chosen for the WWE 2K19 cover. He selected the song "Survival" by Eminem to appear in the soundtrack.

=== Filmography ===
==== Television ====
Year	Series	Role	Notes
2009	Made	Himself	Coach; Episode: "Pro Wrestler: Rebecca"

==== Video games ====
Year	Title	Role	Notes
2008	TNA Impact!	Himself	Playable character
2008	Pro Wrestling X	Technical consultant	Does not appear in-game
2009	TNA Wrestling	Himself	Playable character
2010	TNA Impact!: Cross The Line	Himself	Playable character
2011	TNA Wrestling Impact!	Himself	Playable character
2016	WWE 2K17	Himself	Playable character
2017	WWE 2K18	Himself	Playable character
2018	WWE 2K19	Himself	Playable character, cover star
2019	WWE 2K20	Himself	Playable character
2020	WWE 2K Battlegrounds	Himself	Playable character
2022	WWE 2K22	Himself	Playable character
2023	WWE 2K23	Himself	Playable character
2024	WWE 2K24	Himself	Playable character
2025	WWE 2K25	Himself	Playable character
2026	WWE 2K26	Himself	Playable character

==== Web ====
Year	Series	Role	Notes
2010	Marvel Super Heroes: What The--?!	Cannonball	Episode: "Winter Games: Day 9"
2016	Superstar Ink	Himself	
2016–2020	UpUpDownDown	Himself/Prince of Phenomenal	Regular appearances
2017	Southpaw Regional Wrestling	Malibu Al	Regular appearances

==== WWE Network ====
Year	Title	Role	Notes
2016	Ride Along	Himself	Episode: "Rockford"
2016	Stone Cold Podcast	Himself	Episode 11
2016	The Edge and Christian Show That Totally Reeks of Awesomeness	Himself	Episode: "Spring Break!"
2016–2020	WWE 24	Himself	4 episodes
2017	Table for 3	Himself	Episode: "Common Bonds"

== Personal life ==
Jones has been married to school teacher Wendy since 2000. They have three sons: Ajay Covell Jones (born May 3, 2005), Avery Jones (born February 14, 2007), and Albey Jones (born September 15, 2009), and a daughter, Anney Jones (born October 8, 2014). Their first son's middle name was taken from the last name of Jones' best friend and fellow wrestler Christopher Daniels, whose real name is Daniel Covell. In 2010, Jones acquired a large tattoo down the right side of his torso which reads "AJ 05-03-05 02-14-07 09-15-09", representing his initials and birth dates of his first three children. In 2016, he added the birth date of his fourth child, reading "10-08-14". The family lives in Gainesville, Georgia. Avery would make his professional wrestling debut on June 26, 2026, wrestling under the name "Avery Styles".

Jones is a devout Christian, stating that in his life, "It's God first and family second." He is a fan of Christian hip hop music, and his favorite groups to listen to are the West Coast-based K2S, Lil' Raskull, FTF, and L.G. Wise. While Jones was working for TNA, he met GRITS members Stacey "Coffee" Jones and Teron "Bonafide" Carter at Universal Studios Florida, TNA's former primary television taping location. Jones would become good friends with the duo, using their remix of his entrance music "I Am", later renamed "Get Ready to Fly".

Jones has been accused throughout his career of being homophobic and being prejudiced against LGBTQ people due to his use of the anti-gay slur "faggot" on numerous occasions. The NWA censored part of an NWA TNA segment in 2003 due to his use of inappropriate language, particularly his directing of the slur at Disco Inferno. Management gave no consequences to Jones, who apologized, stating that the slur was "a word you just say when you're goofing off." At a 2005 Ring of Honor show, Styles used the slur against an audience member during a match against Cima. During a backstage segment at a Pro Wrestling Guerrilla show, Styles interrupted a promo for Kevin Steen and used the slur against him.

== Championships and accomplishments ==
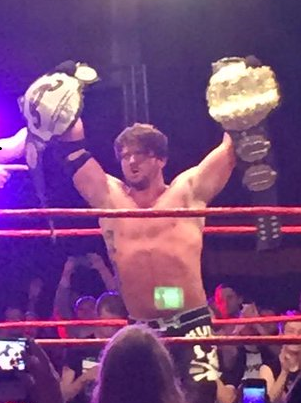
Styles has won numerous titles wrestling in international promotions, such as Revolution Pro Wrestling's RPW British Heavyweight Championship (right hand) and being a two-time IWGP Heavyweight Champion while with New Japan Pro-Wrestling (left hand).

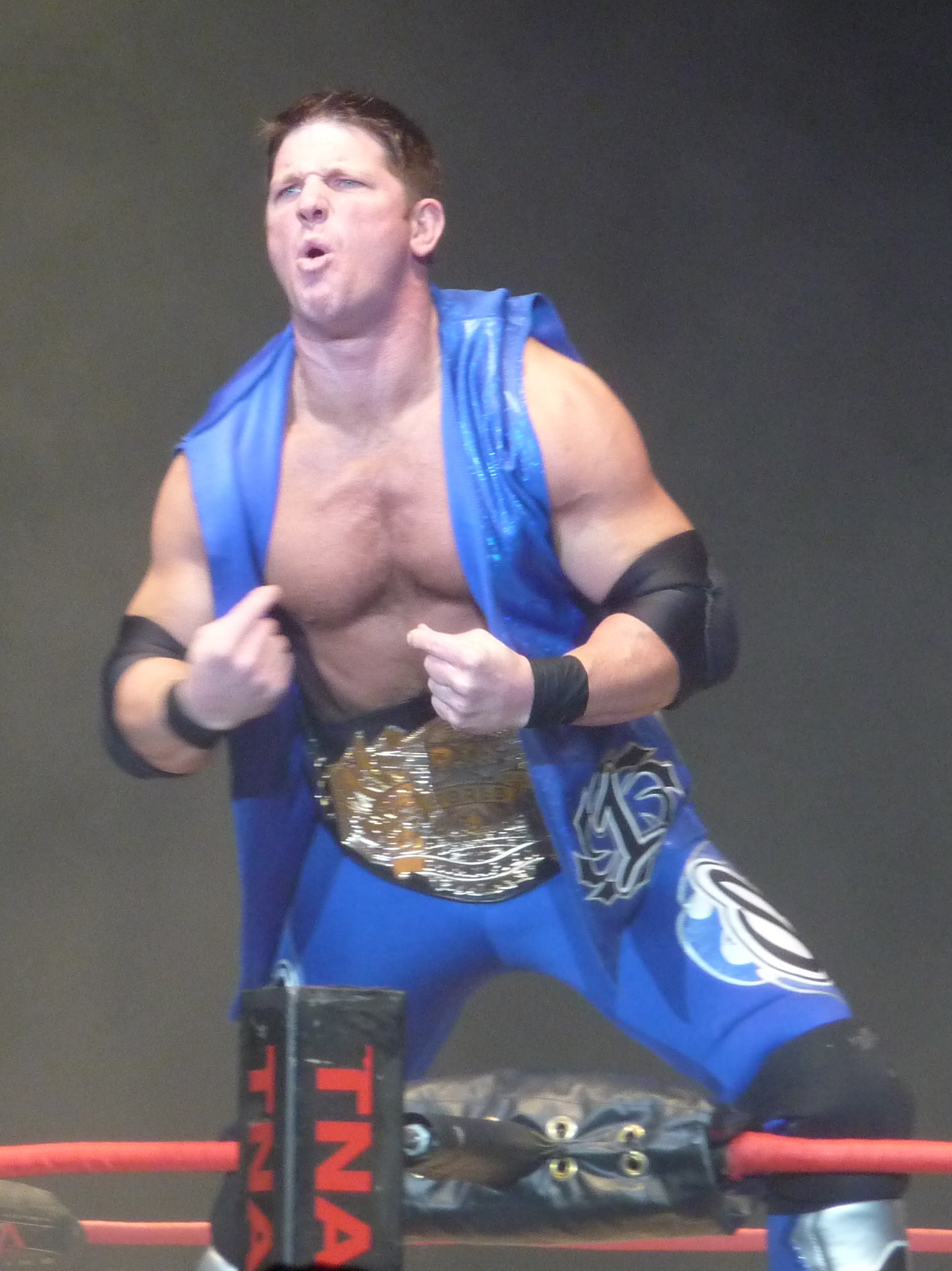
In TNA, he won the TNA World Heavyweight Championship twice and the NWA World's Heavyweight Championship three times.

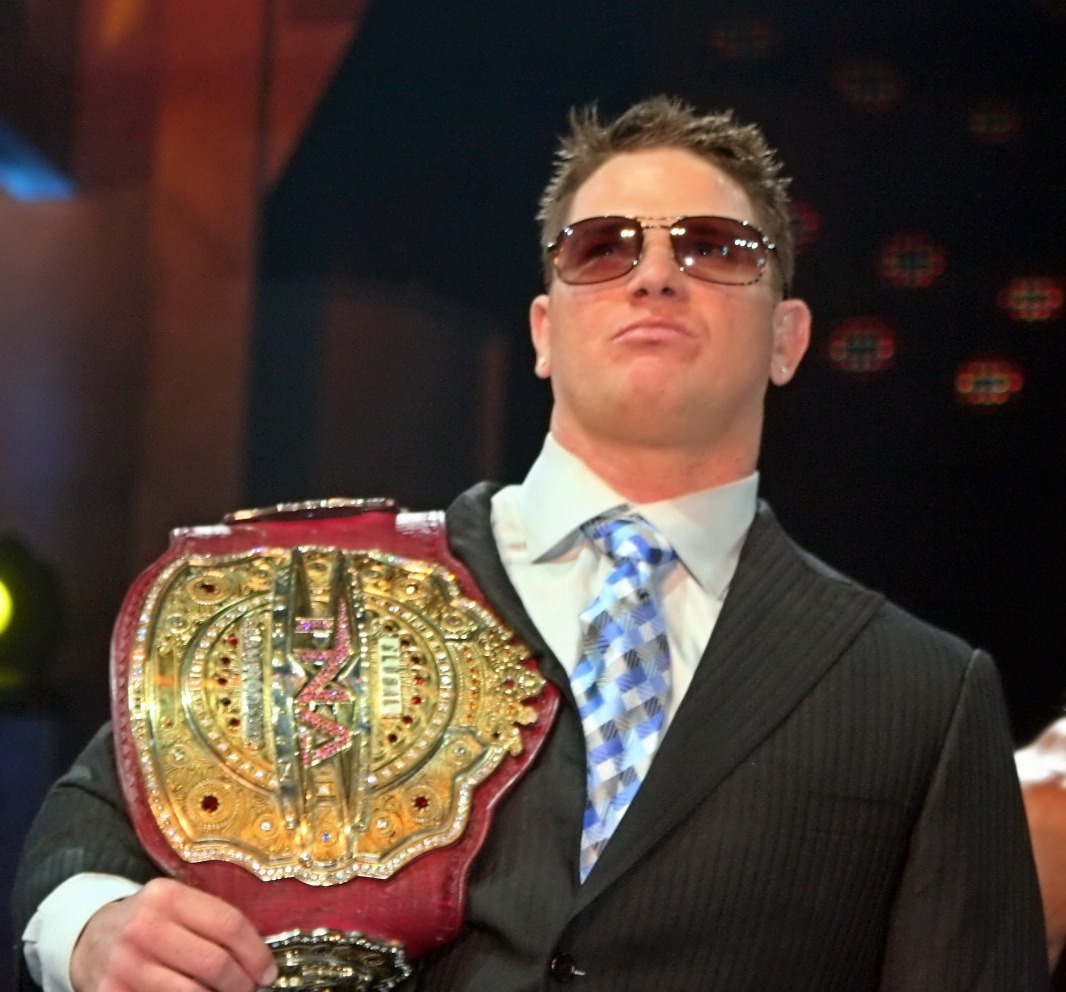
Winning the TNA Legends/Television Championship (of which he is a two-time title holder) made him the first TNA Grand Slam Champion.

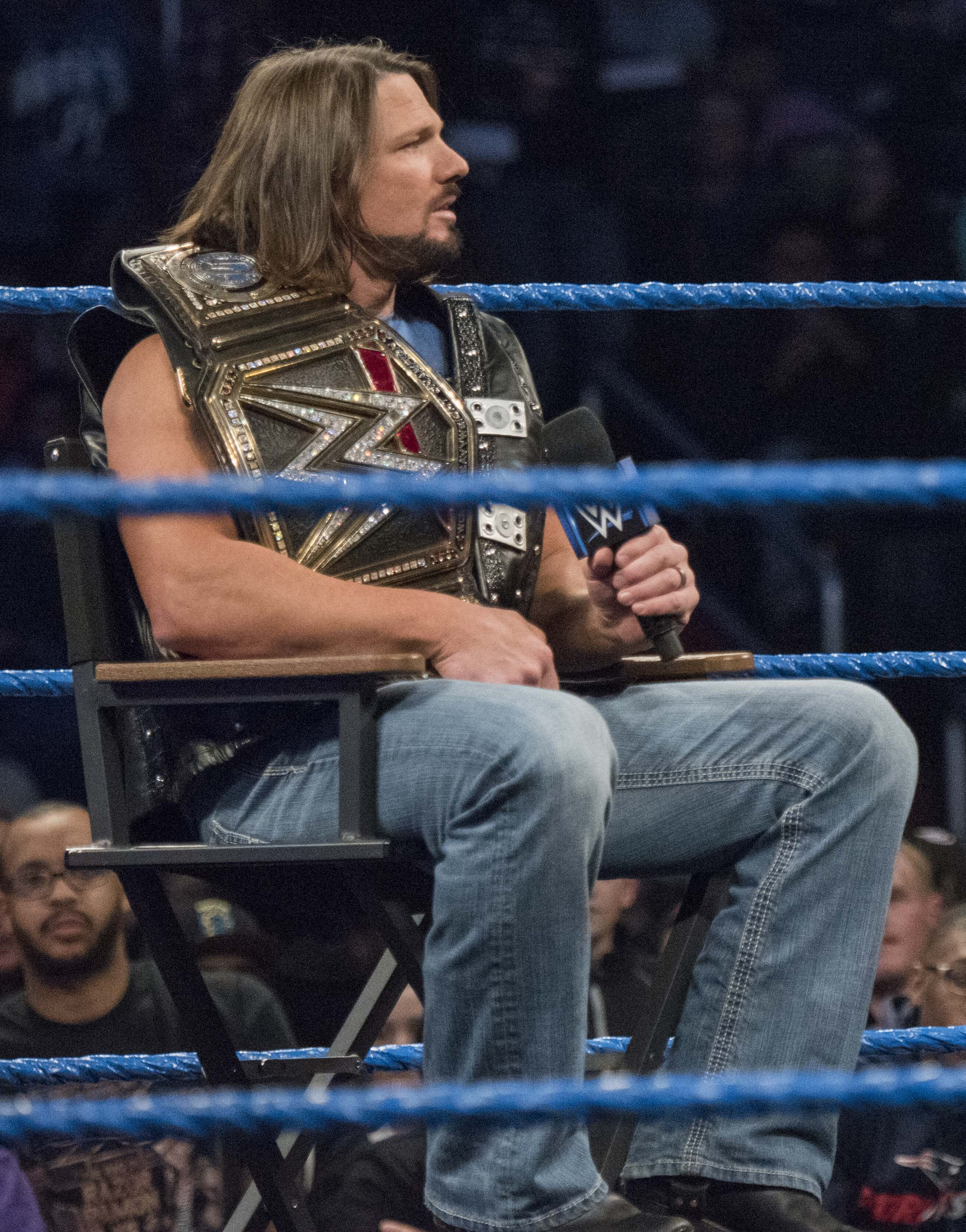
Styles is a two-time WWE Champion.

- All Access Wrestling
  - AAW Heavyweight Championship (1 time)
- Ballpark Brawl
  - Natural Heavyweight Championship (1 time)
- The Baltimore Sun
  - WWE Male Wrestler of the Year (2016)
  - WWE Best In-Ring Moment (2016) – Styles winning the WWE Championship
- Christian Wrestling Federation/Entertainment
  - CWF/CWE Heavyweight Championship (1 time)
- ESPN
  - Match of the Year (2025) – vs. John Cena at Crown Jewel
- Family Wrestling Entertainment
  - FWE Heavyweight Championship (1 time, final)
- Independent Professional Wrestling (Florida)
  - IPW Heavyweight Championship (4 times)
- Independent Wrestling Association Mid-South
  - IWA Mid-South Heavyweight Championship (1 time)
  - Ted Petty Invitational (2004)
- International Wrestling Cartel
  - IWC Super Indies Championship (4 times)
  - Super Indy Survivor Showdown Tournament (2004)
- Independent Wrestling Revolution
  - IWR King of The Indies Championship (1 time)
- Lucha Libre AAA Worldwide
  - Tag Team Tournament (2006) – with Low Ki and Samoa Joe
- Maximum Pro Wrestling
  - Max-Pro Television Championship (1 time)
- Midwest Pro Wrestling
  - MPW Universal Heavyweight Championship (1 time)
- New Japan Pro-Wrestling
  - IWGP Heavyweight Championship (2 times)
- New Korea Pro Wrestling Association
  - NKPWA Junior Heavyweight Championship (1 time)
- NWA Wildside
  - NWA Wildside Heavyweight Championship (1 time)
  - NWA Wildside Television Championship (3 times)
- NWA: Total Nonstop Action / Total Nonstop Action Wrestling
  - NWA World Heavyweight Championship (3 times)
  - TNA World Heavyweight Championship (2 times)
  - TNA X Division Championship (6 times, inaugural)
  - TNA Legends/Global/Television Championship (2 times)
  - NWA World Tag Team Championship (4 times) – with Jerry Lynn (1), Abyss (1) and Christopher Daniels (2)
  - TNA World Tag Team Championship (2 times) – with Tomko (1) and Kurt Angle (1)
  - First TNA Triple Crown Champion (5 times)
  - First TNA Grand Slam Champion (2 times)
  - Bound For Glory Series (2013)
  - TNA World Heavyweight Championship #1 Contenders Tournament (Second Bracket, 2009)
  - Gauntlet for the Gold (2007 – TNA World Tag Team Championship) – with Tomko
  - NWA World Tag Team Championship Tournament (2002) – with Jerry Lynn
  - TNA Year End Awards (10 times)
    - Feud of the Year (2005) vs. Christopher Daniels
    - Finisher of the Year (2003) Styles Clash
    - Match of the Year (2006) with Christopher Daniels vs. Homicide and Hernandez at No Surrender on September 24, 2006
    - Match of the Year (2009) vs. Sting at Bound for Glory on October 18, 2009
    - Mr. TNA (2003–2005)
    - Tag Team of the Year (2006) with Christopher Daniels
    - X Division Star of the Year (2004, 2005)
- Pennsylvania Premiere Wrestling
  - PPW Tag Team Championship (1 time) – with Tommy Suede
- Pro Wrestling Guerrilla
  - PWG World Championship (1 time)
- Pro Wrestling Illustrated
  - Match of the Year (2016) vs. John Cena at SummerSlam
  - Tag Team of the Year (2006) with Christopher Daniels
  - Most Popular Wrestler (2017, 2018)
  - Wrestler of the Year (2016–2018)
  - Wrestler of the Decade (2010s)
  - Ranked No. 1 of the 500 best singles wrestlers of the year in the PWI 500 in 2010
- Revolution Pro Wrestling
  - RPW British Heavyweight Championship (1 time)
- Ring of Honor
  - ROH Pure Championship (1 time, inaugural)
  - ROH World Tag Team Championship (1 time) – with Amazing Red
  - ROH Pure Wrestling Championship Tournament (2004)
- Rolling Stone
  - WWE Wrestler of the Year (2016)
- Sports Illustrated
  - Ranked No. 4 of the top 10 men's wrestlers in 2018
  - Ranked No. 2 of the top 10 wrestlers in 2017
- World Wrestling All-Stars
  - WWA International Cruiserweight Championship (1 time)
  - WWA International Cruiserweight Championship Tournament (2002)
- WrestleCrap
  - Gooker Award (2012) – Claire Lynch (AJ Styles/Christopher Daniels and Kazarian feud).
- Wrestling Observer Newsletter
  - Best Flying Wrestler (2005)
  - Best Wrestling Maneuver (2003, 2015) Styles Clash
  - Most Outstanding Wrestler (2014–2016)
  - Pro Wrestling Match of the Year (2014) vs. Minoru Suzuki on August 1
  - Wrestler of the Year (2015, 2016)
  - United States/Canada MVP (2018)
  - Worst Worked Match of the Year (2006) TNA reverse battle royal on the October 26, 2006, episode of Impact!
  - Wrestling Observer Newsletter Hall of Fame (Class of 2017)
- WWE
  - WWE Championship (2 times) (Note: When Styles first won the title, it was called the WWE World Championship. During his reign, it was renamed to WWE Championship in December 2016.)
  - WWE Intercontinental Championship (1 time)
  - WWE United States Championship (3 times)
  - World Tag Team Championship (Note: His first reign was when the title was known as the Raw Tag Team Championship.) (2 times) – with Omos (1) and Dragon Lee (1)
  - 32nd Triple Crown Champion
  - 15th Grand Slam Champion (under current format; 22nd overall)
  - WWE Intercontinental Championship Tournament (2020)
  - Undisputed WWE Championship Eliminator Tournament (2024)
  - WWE Hall of Fame (Class of 2026)
  - Slammy Award (1 time)
    - Match of the Year (2020) vs. The Undertaker in a Boneyard match at WrestleMania 36
