= Goofy (disambiguation) =

Goofy is a fictional cartoon character created by The Walt Disney Company.

Goofy may also refer to:

- A phrase used to describe someone or something that is clumsy and foolish
- Goofy (film series), a short film series starring the Disney character
- Goofy (band), a South Korean dance music and hip hop trio
- Goofy (footedness), a stance in boardsports
- Goofy Ridge, Illinois, United States, a census-designated place
- Gufi Paintal (1944–2023), Indian actor and director

== See also ==
- Goof (disambiguation)
- Goofball (disambiguation)
