= Goofball =

Goofball may refer to

- A person exhibiting silliness
- An older slang term for barbiturates
- Goofball (EP), an extended play by Moody Good

== See also ==
- Goof (disambiguation)
- Goofy (disambiguation)
