= Goof Abaaley =

- Town
- Location in Somalia.
- Coordinates: 3°18′N 43°30′E
- Country: Somalia
- Region: Bay
- Time zone: UTC+3 (EAT)

Goof Abaaley is a town in the southern Bay region of Somalia.
