= Goofing off =

Popular form of procrastination

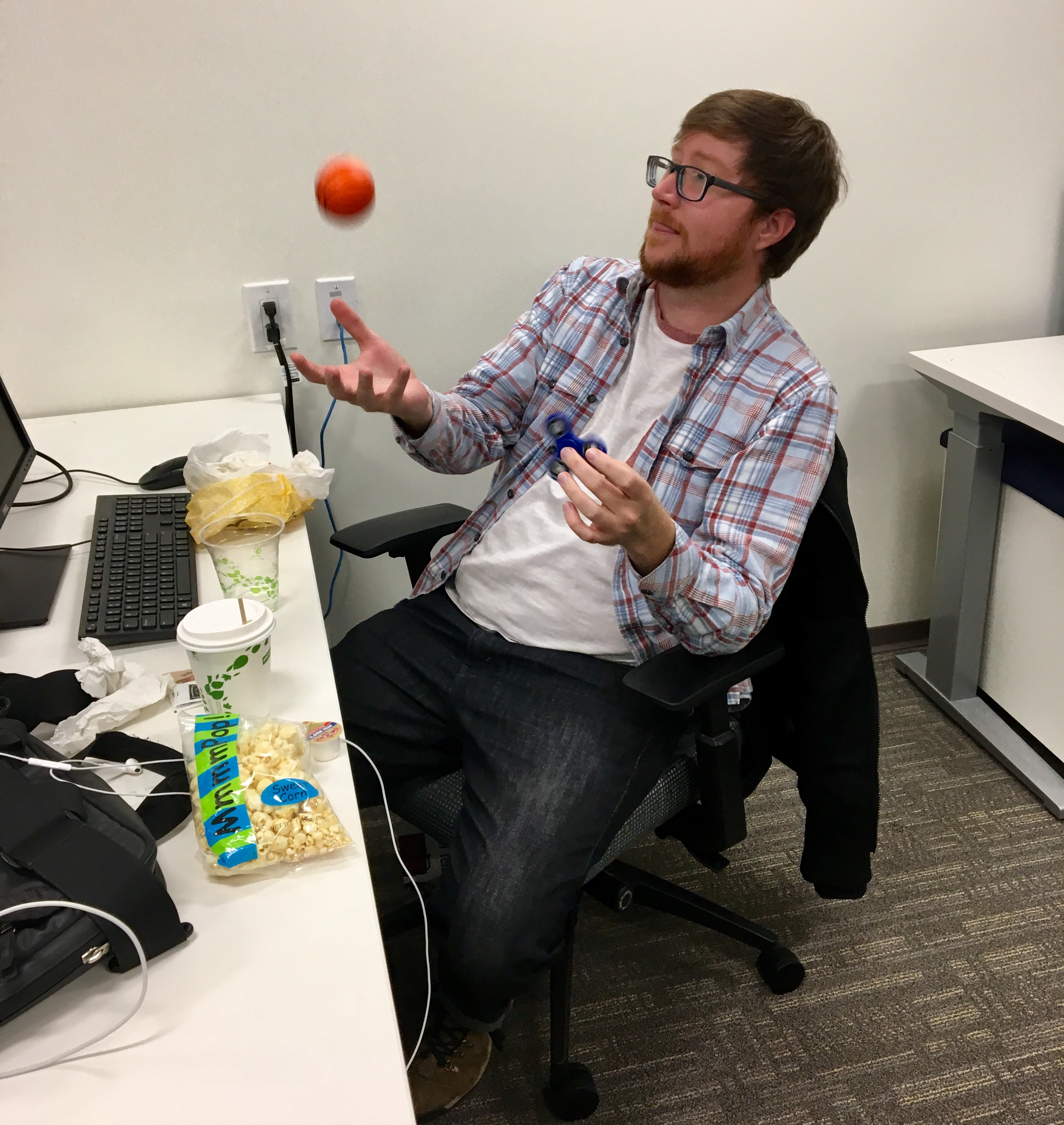
A man goofing off at work, playing with a fidget spinner and a ball

Goofing off is a North American slang term for engaging in recreation or an idle pastime while obligations of work or society are neglected.

The Online Etymology Dictionary traces the word “goof” to derive from French “goffe” meaning “awkward” or “stupid,”. Alternatively it may also stem from Middle English goffen, meaning “to speak in a frivolous manner,” which itself may have come from Old English gegaf (“buffoonery”).

Common obligations neglected in the course of goofing off include schoolwork, paid employment, social courtesies and the expectations of new relations. According to the National Day Calendar, “National Goof Off Day” is observed annually on March 22. Goofing off at school is considered to be a regular behaviour in the Western world, which is engaged in by all students at one time or another.

When goofing off occurs within the classroom, teachers can resolve the matter quickly by direct confrontation. Employers may use wage premiums to discourage goofing off by their employees, although it is suggested that the effects of such incentives cause aging to have a negative effect upon earnings sooner than would be otherwise expected. Goofing off has been shown to improve work or study in the right environments, and can relieve stress. It may be a form of creativity and experimentation, providing useful learning experiences and discoveries.

A 2007 study by Wayne H. Decker and Thomas Calo reported that men were more likely than women to describe “goofing off” as playing around at work, often comparing their work to sports. Women, in contrast, were more likely to view it as their responsibility to stay on task and regarded goofing off as unfair to their colleagues. Some research has indicated that women tend to feel more guilt than men about taking time for themselves and so use breaks to become more organized.

== See also ==
- Procrastination
- Slacker
- Sloth
- Truancy
