= TNA Lockdown (2008) =

2008 Total Nonstop Action Wrestling pay-per-view event

Lockdown (2008)
- Promotional poster featuring Kurt Angle and Samoa Joe
- Promotion: Total Nonstop Action Wrestling
- Date: April 13, 2008
- City: Lowell, Massachusetts
- Venue: Tsongas Arena
- Attendance: 5,500

Pay-per-view chronology
← Previous; Destination X	Next → Sacrifice

Lockdown chronology
← Previous; 2007	Next → 2009

The 2008 Lockdown was a professional wrestling pay-per-view (PPV) event produced by the Total Nonstop Action Wrestling (TNA) promotion, which took place on April 13, 2008, at the Tsongas Arena in Lowell, Massachusetts. It was the fourth under the Lockdown chronology and fourth event in the 2008 TNA PPV schedule. Eight professional wrestling matches, two of which for championships, were featured on the card. In the concept of Lockdown events, every match took place inside a six-sided steel structure known as the Six Sides of Steel.

The main event was for the TNA World Heavyweight Championship between then-champion Kurt Angle and Samoa Joe, with the added stipulation if Joe lost he would retire from professional wrestling. Joe won the encounter, thus winning the TNA World Heavyweight Championship for the first time. Also held on the card was the 2008 Lethal Lockdown match between Team Cage and Team Tomko. Team Cage of Christian Cage, Matt Morgan, Kevin Nash, Rhino, and Sting defeated Tomko, A.J. Styles, James Storm, and Team 3D (Brother Devon and Brother Ray) of Team Tomko in the contest. Two featured bouts were scheduled on the undercard. The first was an Intergender Tag Team match pitting the team of Robert Roode and Payton Banks against the team of Booker T and Sharmell. Booker T and Sharmell were the victors in the match. The TNA X Division Championship was defended in the 2008 TNA Xscape match by Jay Lethal against Consequences Creed, Curry Man, Johnny Devine, Shark Boy, and Sonjay Dutt. Lethal won the competition to retain the championship.

Lockdown marked the fourth time the Lethal Lockdown and Xscape match formats were used by TNA. 55,000 was the reported figure of purchasers for the event by The Wrestling Observer Newsletter. Lockdown had an attendance of 5,500 people. Chris Sokol of the professional wrestling section of the Canadian Online Explorer rated the event a 6.5 out of 10, higher than the 2007 event's ranking of 5.5 out of 10 also by Sokol.

== Production ==
=== Background ===
The fourth installment in the Lockdown chronology was announced in January 2008 as taking place on April 13. It was later reported that Lockdown was suspected to be held outside of the TNA Impact! Zone. The New England area was reported as the believed location, making it TNA's first PPV in the Northeastern area. TNA issued a press release in mid-February 2008 announcing that Lockdown would be held on April 13, 2008, at the Tsongas Arena in Lowell, Massachusetts. Tickets for the event went on sale on February 29, 2008. TNA held a "TNA Fan Interaction" on April 12, 2008, as part of the festivities of the show. TNA created a section covering the event on their website. TNA released a poster to promote the event sometimes prior featuring Kurt Angle and Samoa Joe. The official theme for the spectacle was Nothing to Lose by Operator.

=== Storylines ===
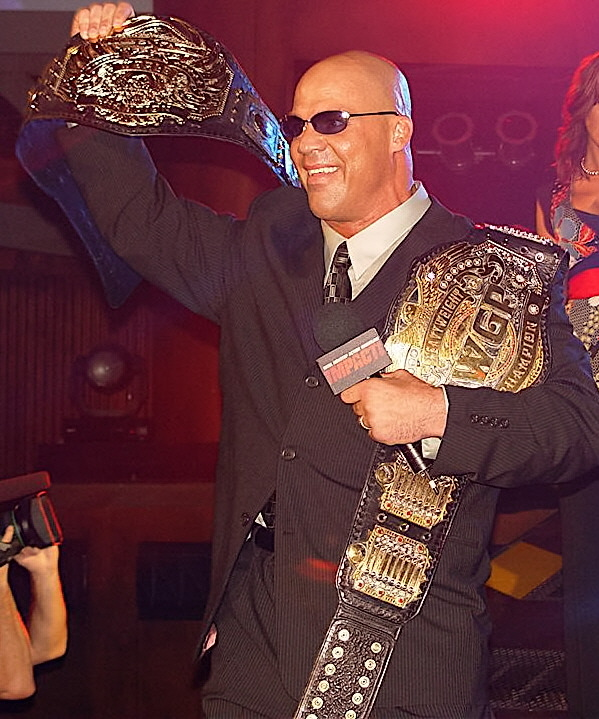
Kurt Angle (pictured) defended the TNA World Heavyweight Championship against Samoa Joe in a Six Sides of Steel Cage match at Lockdown.

Lockdown featured eight professional wrestling matches that involved different wrestlers from pre-existing scripted feuds and storylines. Wrestlers portrayed villains, heroes, or less distinguishable characters in the scripted events that built tension and that culminated into a wrestling match or series of matches. Every match was contested inside the Six Sides of Steel.

The main event was a Six Sides of Steel Cage match for the TNA World Heavyweight Championship between then-champion Kurt Angle and the challenger Samoa Joe. This bout was announced on the March 13 episode of TNA's television program TNA Impact! by Management Director Jim Cornette. Joe proclaimed on the same episode that if he did not win the title at Lockdown, he would quit TNA in the storyline. Afterwards, Joe was not seen until the April 10 episode of Impact!, with training for the match being the reason for his absence. On the April 10 episode of Impact!, a contract signing took place between Joe and Angle regarding the match. Joe signed the contract, making it official if he lost the match at Lockdown he would instead quit professional wrestling forever. This match was the progression of a long-standing series of matches between Angle and Joe. Angle having won three of four of their past contests at TNA's Genesis PPV event on November 19, 2006, TNA's Turning Point PPV event on December 19, 2006, TNA's Final Resolution on January 14, 2007, and at TNA's Hard Justice on August 12, 2007.

The 2008 Lethal Lockdown match was announced on the March 13 episode of Impact! by Cornette. Cornette announced that the 2008 installment would have two four-man teams captained by either Christian Cage or Tomko. During the same episode, A.J. Styles and Team 3D (Brother Devon and Brother Ray) were chosen by Tomko to be a part of Team Tomko at Lockdown. Meanwhile, Kevin Nash joined Cage as the second member of Team Cage. Rhino joined Team Cage on the March 20 episode of Impact!. On the March 27 episode of Impact!, Sting joined Team Cage, to round out the team. It was announced on the April 3 episode of Impact! that each team captain would be allowed to add another member, making it a five-on-five match at Lockdown. James Storm was added to Team Tomko during the show, while Matt Morgan aligned with Team Cage. This contest was the result of an existing feud pitting Cage against Tomko and Styles. Cage, Tomko, and Styles were once united under the Christian's Coalition banner, until Styles and Tomko aligned with Angle and formed The Angle Alliance in late 2007. At TNA's Final Resolution PPV event on January 6, 2008, Cage fought Angle for the TNA World Heavyweight Championship. Styles interfered in the contest aiding Angle, costing Cage the title. Cage fought for the title against Angle again at TNA's Against All Odds PPV event on February 10, 2008, however, Tomko interfered aiding Angle to retain the title.

Booker T and Sharmell versus the team of Robert Roode and Payton Banks in a Six Sides of Steel Intergender Tag Team Cage match was another highly promoted match heading into the event. This encounter was announced on the March 20 episode of Impact! by Cornette. The feud regarding this encounter began at Final Resolution, where Roode accidentally punched Booker T's real-life wife Sharmell, fracturing her jaw in the storyline and leaving her sidelined indefinitely. Booker T and Roode then fought at Against All Odds to a double count-out. At TNA's Destination X PPV event on March 9, 2008, Roode and Booker T fought in a Stand By Your Man Strap match, which Roode won. After the bout, Sharmell returned from injury attacking Roode and his manager Banks with a leather strap.

The TNA X Division Championship was defended in the 2008 TNA Xscape match by Jay Lethal against five other competitors. TNA held qualification matches on Impact! leading up to Lockdown to determine the five other participants besides Lethal. The first to qualify was Curry Man by defeating Petey Williams on the March 13 episode. Sonjay Dutt defeated Homicide on the March 20 episode to qualify. The third qualification was Johnny Devine by defeating Alex Shelley on the March 27 episode. On the April 3 episode, Shark Boy defeated Elix Skipper to qualify. Consequences Creed was the last to qualify by defeating Jimmy Rave on the April 10 episode.

== Event ==
=== Miscellaneous ===
Lockdown featured employees other than the wrestlers involved in the matches. Mike Tenay and Don West were the commentators for the telecast, with Frank Trigg providing guest commentary for the main event only. Jeremy Borash and David Penzer were ring announcers for the event. Andrew Thomas, Earl Hebner, Rudy Charles, and Mark "Slick" Johnson participated as referees for the encounters. Lauren Thompson and Borash were used as interviewers during the event. Besides employees appearing in a wrestling role, SoCal Val, Trigg, Karen Angle, Marcus Davis, and members of Samoa Joe's family all appeared on camera, either in backstage or ringside segments. Joe's family were in attendance to perform a traditional Samoan fire dance during his ring entrance.

=== Preliminary matches ===
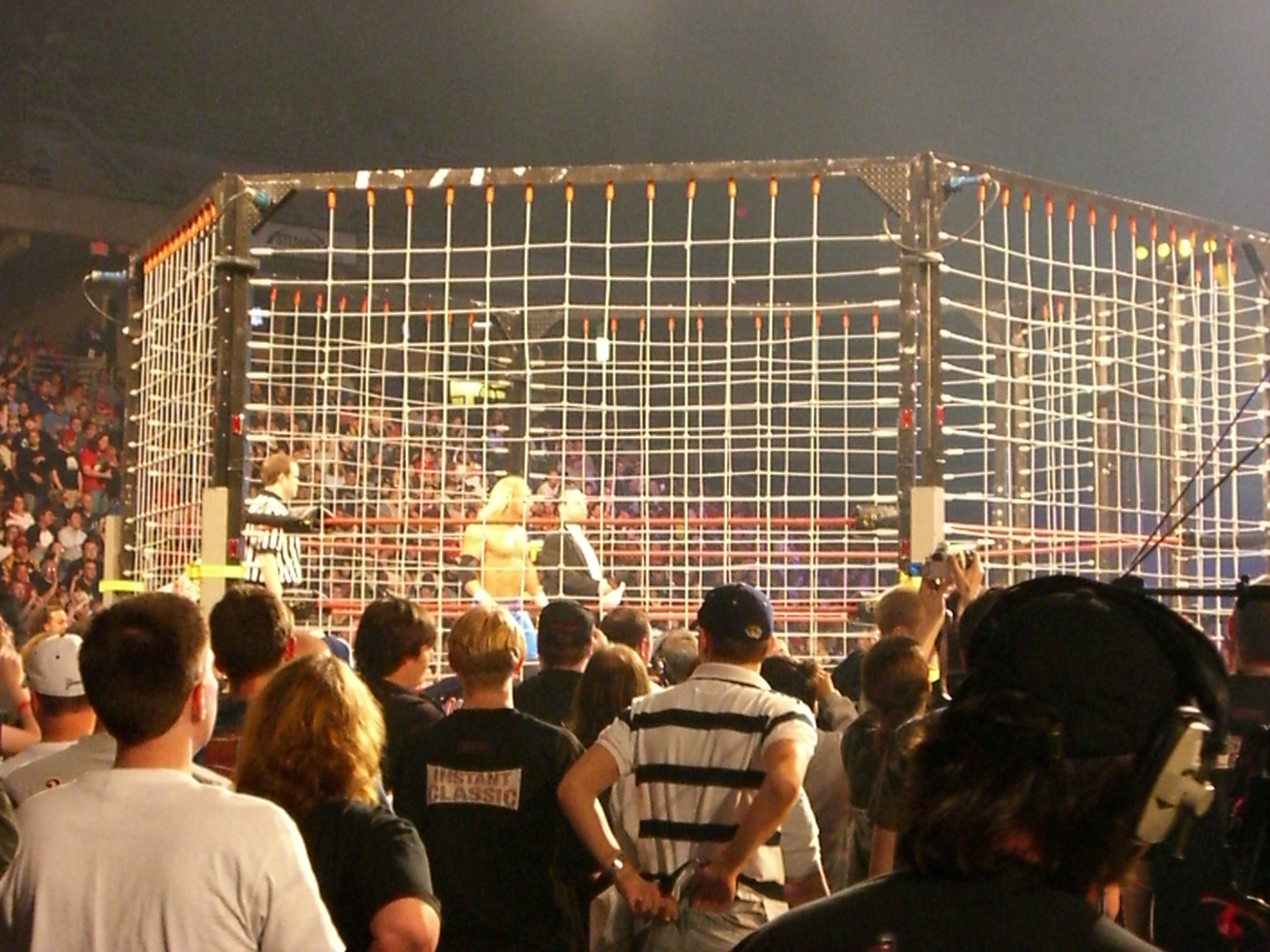
All matches contested at Lockdown were held inside the Six Sides of Steel.

Jay Lethal defended the TNA X Division Championship against Consequences Creed, Curry Man, Johnny Devine, Shark Boy, and Sonjay Dutt in the 2008 TNA Xscape match to open the event. In this match, the six competitors fought until four were eliminated by pinfall or submission; the two remaining wrestlers then fought to escape from the cage, with the first to do so the winner. The duration of the contest was 10 minutes and 45 seconds. Dutt was the first eliminated in the bout by Devine with a roll-up pin at 2 minutes and 50 seconds. The second was Shark Boy at 4 minutes and 30 seconds, after Creed performed his signature Creed-DT maneuver. At 7 minutes and 15 seconds, Creed was eliminated by Curry Man after his signature Spice Rack maneuver. Curry Man was the last eliminated at 8 minutes and 40 seconds by Devine following his signature Devine Intervention maneuver. With the match down to two competitors, Devine and Lethal fought to escape the cage. Lethal escaped the cage first, thus winning the match and retaining the TNA X Division Championship.

The first-ever Queen of the Cage match for number one contendership to the TNA Women's Knockout Championship was next. The participants in the encounter were Angelina Love, Christy Hemme, Jackie Moore, Rhaka Khan, Roxxi Laveaux, Salinas, Traci Brooks, and Velvet Sky. In this match, the participants fought on the outside of the ring to climb into the cage. The first two to do so had a standard wrestling match, with the winner determined by pinfall or submission. It lasted 5 minutes and 30 seconds. Laveaux and Love were the first to enter the cage, with Laveaux gaining the pinfall after her signature Voodoo Drop maneuver to become the first-ever Queen of the Cage and become number one contender to the TNA Women's Knockout Championship.

The third encounter pitted B.G. James against Kip James in a Six Sides of Steel Cage match. Kip jumped B.G. as he entered the cage to begin the match. B.G. won the match with a roll-up pin at 8 minutes even. Kip attacked B.G. after the match.

TNA held a Six Team Cuffed in the Cage match in the following bout. The teams participating were Black Reign and Rellik, Kaz and Eric Young/Super Eric, The Latin American Xchange (Hernandez and Homicide), The Motor City Machine Guns (Alex Shelley and Chris Sabin), Petey Williams and Scott Steiner, and The Rock 'n Rave Infection (Jimmy Rave and Lance Hoyt). Its duration was 10 minutes and 45 seconds. The objective of this match was for a wrestler to handcuff another wrestler to the cage, until there was only one left. Prior to the match, Young was attacked by Reign and Rellik, forcing Kaz to start the match without him. Later, Young entered the match dressed in his "Super Eric" gimmick and cuffed Rave and Hoyt to the cage. He then tricked Reign into cuffing Rellik, before he slammed Reign head-first into the mat with a Death Valley Driver and followed by cuffing him to win the match for Kaz and himself.

Gail Kim and ODB fought Awesome Kong and Raisha Saeed in a Six Sides of Steel Tag Team Cage match, which lasted 8 minutes and 30 seconds. Near the end, Kong missed a spinning back-fist on ODB and instead hit Saeed. ODB followed by performing a splash from the top of a padded turnbuckle to win the match for her team.

=== Main event matches ===
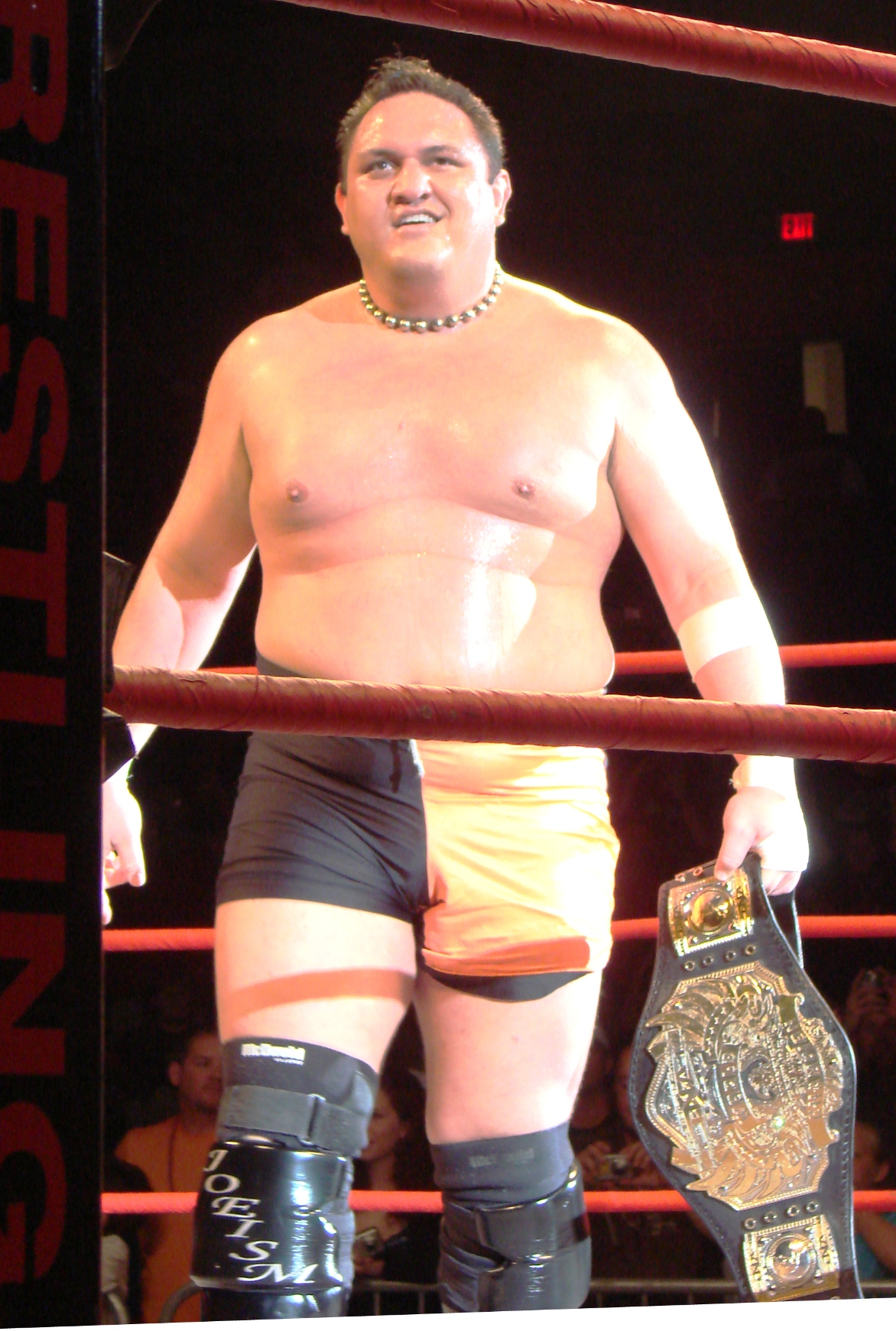
Samoa Joe (pictured) won the TNA World Heavyweight Championship (pictured) for the first time from Kurt Angle at Lockdown.

The Six Sides of Steel Intergender Tag Team Cage match followed, pitting the team of Booker T and Sharmell against the team of Robert Roode and Payton Banks. The match began with Booker T and Roode, until Sharmell tagged in. Later, Banks tagged in to face Sharmell. Afterwards, Banks accidentally slapped Roode, allowing Sharmell to pin Banks with a roll-up at 7 minutes and 45 seconds.

The 2008 Lethal Lockdown match was the seventh bout on the card, between Team Cage (Christian Cage, Matt Morgan, Kevin Nash, Rhino, and Sting) and Team Tomko (Tomko, A.J. Styles, James Storm, and Team 3D). The duration of the contest was 26 minutes and 45 seconds. A Lethal Lockdown match is fought under no disqualification rules, in which weapons are legal and one wrestler from each team starts the match in the cage. Afterwards, members from each team enter at time intervals until all wrestlers are involved in the bout so a pinfall or submission can occur. Cage and Styles started the match. Brother Ray, Rhino, Storm, Nash, Brother Devon, Morgan, Tomko, and Sting were the order of entrances for the contest. Shortly after Sting's entrance, a roof covered in weapons was lowered onto the cage. With Sting's participation all men were involved in the match, as such a pinfall or submission could now occur. During the encounter, Cage set up a table on top of the roof of the cage. Later, he and Styles were fighting on top of a ladder on top of the cage, when Storm pushed over the ladder causing them both to crash through the table. Storm then climbed down from the roof into the cage, where Rhino tackled and pinned him to secure the victory for Team Cage.

The main event was a Six Sides of Steel Cage match for the TNA World Heavyweight Championship between then-champion Kurt Angle and the challenger Samoa Joe. The added stipulation to this bout was if Joe lost, he would be forced to retire from professional wrestling forever. Frank Trigg provided commentary for this match. The match was primarily technical, with each combatant switching through various holds and submission maneuvers. One such submission was the Figure-Four Leglock, which Angle applied to Joe. Angle was forced to release the hold when Joe grabbed the bottom rope. Joe then applied a Boston Crab, before switching to an STF, which Angle countered into an Ankle Lock. Following the hold being broken, Angle performed his signature Olympic Slam maneuver on Joe for a near-fall. Later, Joe applied his signature Coquina Clutch submission on Angle, which was forced to be released when Angle grabbed the bottom rope. The match finally came to a conclusion when Joe lifted up Angle and slammed him to the mat back-first with his signature Muscle Buster maneuver. Joe then covered for the pinfall at 17 minutes and 45 seconds to win the TNA World Heavyweight Championship for the first time.

== Reception ==
The Tsongas Arena has a maximum capacity of 6,500 for sporting events. A total of 5,500 people attended the event. In late 2008, the Wrestling Observer Newsletter reported that the number of pay-per-view purchasers for the event was believed to be 55,000. Canadian Online Explorer writer Chris Sokol rated the entire event a 6.5 out of 10, which was higher than the 5.5 out of 10 given to the 2007 Lockdown event also by Sokol. Lockdown received the same rating as TNA's previous event Destination X. While it was lower than TNA's next event Sacrifice on May 11, which was ranked a 7 out of 10 by Sokol. Compared to rival World Wrestling Entertainment's Backlash PPV event held on April 28, Lockdown was rated higher, as Dave Hillhouse gave Backlash a 6 out of 10. Sokol felt that Lockdown was "an iffy PPV", but was "not a bad effort by TNA". However, he still thought it was "not one of their stronger PPV outings". The main event was given an 8 out of 10 by Sokol in his review. His highest rating went to the Lethal Lockdown match with 9 out of 10. The Queen of the Cage was given his lowest of 4 out of 10. The Xscape match was rated a 6.5 out of 10, while the Six Sides of Steel Intergender Tag Team Cage match received a 7 out of 10. Sokol stated he believed the main event was a "solid match". Regarding the Lethal Lockdown match, Sokol commented saying it was "excellent".

Wade Keller of the Pro Wrestling Torch reviewed Lockdown, giving the main event 4 1/2 stars out of 5, while the Lethal Lockdown match 3 1/2 stars out of 5. Keller went on to state in his review he felt Angle versus Joe was a "really good main event". Commenting that "it felt fresh with the MMA-style, and meshed just enough pro wrestling moves in a largely believable fashion with typical (and some not-so-typical) MMA submissions throughout in dramatic fashion. It's really a stellar example of how the two styles could mesh to create a more modern, believable approach for the current era". James Caldwell also of the Pro Wrestling Torch published a review of the event. In his review, he also gave the main event 4 1/2 stars out of 5, however, gave the Lethal Lockdown only 3 stars out of 5. Regarding the TNA World Heavyweight Championship bout, Caldwell said it was "great match", but that he felt like "there could have been more". Although, he believed this "was TNA at its best with no b.s. to get in the way, and a display of two of the best in the world". On the January 1, 2009 episode of Impact!, TNA announced their Year End Awards for 2008, with Kurt Angle versus Samoa Joe in a Six Sides of Steel Cage match for the TNA World Heavyweight Championship named Match of the Year. Lockdown was released on DVD on June 17, 2008, by TNA Home Video.

== Aftermath ==
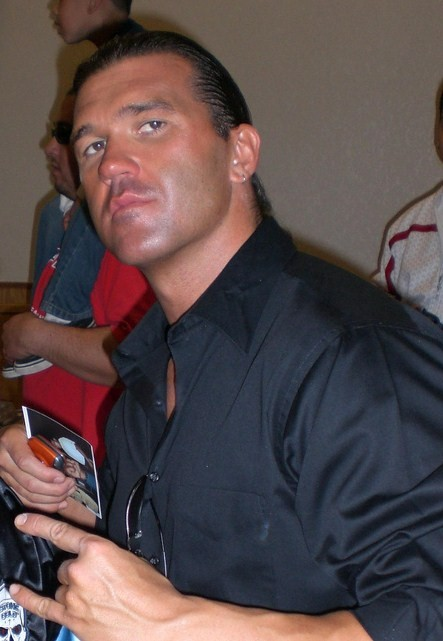
Kazarian (pictured) won the TerrorDome to become number one contender to the TNA X Division Championship and take Kurt Angle's place in the main event at Sacrifice.

Kurt Angle was legitimately injured during the show and it was believed he may have been knocked unconscious as well.

TNA held a rematch between Angle and Samoa Joe for the TNA World Heavyweight Championship on the April 24 episode of Impact!, which Joe won after interference from Scott Steiner. On the April 17 episode of Impact!, Steiner challenged Joe to a TNA World Heavyweight Championship defense at Sacrifice with his Feast or Fired TNA World Heavyweight Title shot. Due to Steiner's interference in the rematch, Management Director Jim Cornette made the title defense at Sacrifice a Three Way match between Joe, Steiner, and Angle. At the event Angle announced he received a legitimate neck injury wrestling overseas and would not be competing in the match that night. Kaz took Angle's place in the match, which Joe won to retain the TNA World Heavyweight Championship. Joe went on to hold the TNA World Heavyweight Championship until TNA's Bound for Glory IV PPV event on October 12, 2008, where he lost it to Sting.

Multiple wrestlers who competed at Lockdown went on to compete in the Deuces Wild Tag Team Tournament for the vacant TNA World Tag Team Championship at Sacrifice. On the April 17 episode of Impact!, A.J. Styles and Tomko defended the TNA World Tag Team Championship in a Three Way match against the teams of Kaz and Eric Young and The Latin American Xchange (Hernandez and Homicide; LAX). The match ended in a controversial win for Kaz and Young which led to Cornette stripping them of the championship. He then followed by setting up the Deuces Wild Tag Team Tournament on the April 24 episode of Impact!. Team 3D, LAX, Styles and Super Eric, Christian Cage and Rhino, Robert Roode and Booker T, Sting and James Storm, B.G. James and Awesome Kong, and Kip James and Matt Morgan competed in the Deuces Wild Tag Team Tournament. At Sacrifice, LAX defeated Team 3D in the Finals to win the vacant TNA World Tag Team Championship.

TNA X Division Champion Jay Lethal later lost the championship to Petey Williams on the April 17 episode of Impact! after Williams used his Feast or Fired TNA X Division Tite shot. TNA debuted a new match type at Sacrifice named the TerrorDome. At the event it was used to determine the new number contender to the TNA X Division Championship. However, during the show Management Director Jim Cornette announced the winner would also take Angle's place in the main event. Kaz went on to win the match, thus becoming number one contender and taking Angle's place.

Roxxi Laveaux got her TNA Women's Knockout Championship match against then-champion Awesome Kong on the April 17 episode of Impact!, which Kong won. TNA then announced a TNA Knockouts Makeover Battle Royal to determine the number one contender to the TNA Women's Knockout Championship at Sacrifice on the April 24 episode of Impact!. The match involved two stages, with the second being a ladder match between the final two competitors. The winner of that stage would become number one contender while the loser would have their head shaved bald. Gail Kim won immunity from having her head shaven on the May 8 episode of Impact!. Kim went on to win the contest, while Laveaux had her head shaven.

In October 2017, with the launch of the Global Wrestling Network, the event became available to stream on demand.

== Results ==
No.	Results	Stipulations	Times
1	Jay Lethal (c) defeated Consequences Creed, Curry Man, Johnny Devine, Shark Boy and Sonjay Dutt	Six-man Xscape match for the TNA X Division Championship	10:45
2	Roxxi Laveaux defeated Angelina Love, Christy Hemme, Jackie Moore, Rhaka Khan, Salinas, Traci Brooks and Velvet Sky	Queen of the Cage match to determine the #1 contender to the TNA Women's Knockout Championship	5:30
3	B.G. James defeated Kip James	Six Sides of Steel Cage match	8:00
4	Kaz and Super Eric defeated Black Reign and Rellik, The Latin American Xchange (Hernandez and Homicide), The Motor City Machine Guns (Alex Shelley and Chris Sabin), Petey Williams and Scott Steiner, and The Rock 'n' Rave Infection (Jimmy Rave and Lance Hoyt)	Six Team Cuffed in the Cage match	10:45
5	Gail Kim and ODB defeated Awesome Kong and Raisha Saeed	Six Sides of Steel Cage match	8:30
6	Booker T and Sharmell defeated Robert Roode and Payton Banks	Six Sides of Steel Cage match	7:45
7	Team Cage (Christian Cage, Kevin Nash, Matt Morgan, Rhino and Sting) defeated Team Tomko (A.J. Styles, James Storm, Tomko and Team 3D (Brother Devon and Brother Ray)) (with Jackie Moore)	Lethal Lockdown match	26:45
8	Samoa Joe defeated Kurt Angle (c)	Title vs. Career Six Sides of Steel Cage match for the TNA World Heavyweight Championship	17:45
(c) / – the champion(s) heading into the match

Xscape match

Elimination No.	Eliminated	Eliminator	Notes	Duration
1	Sonjay Dutt	Johnny Devine	Devine pinned Dutt with a roll-up pin.	2:50
2	Shark Boy	Consequences Creed	Creed pinned Shark Boy after his signature Creed-DT maneuver.	4:30
3	Consequences Creed	Curry Man	Curry Man pinned Creed after his signature Spice Rack maneuver.	7:15
4	Curry Man	Johnny Devine	Devine pinned Curry Man after his signature Devine Intervention maneuver.	8:40
Loser	Johnny Devine	N/A	Devine failed to escape the cage before Lethal.	10:40
WINNER	Jay Lethal	N/A	Lethal escaped the cage before Devine to win the match and retain the championship.	10:40

Cuffed in the Cage

Elimination No.	Eliminated	Eliminator
1	Scott Steiner	Black Reign, Rellik, Kaz and Lance Hoyt
2	Alex Shelley	Petey Williams
3	Chris Sabin	Kaz
4	Petey Williams	Black Reign and Rellik
5	Hernandez	Black Reign
6	Homicide	Rellik
7	Kaz	Black Reign and Rellik
8	Jimmy Rave	Super Eric
9	Lance Hoyt	Super Eric
10	Rellik	Super Eric
11	Black Reign	Super Eric
Winner	Eric Young/Super Eric (with Kaz)	N/A

Lethal Lockdown entrances

Entrance No.	Wrestler	Team	Time
1	Christian Cage	Team Cage	0:00
2	A.J. Styles	Team Tomko	0:00
3	Brother Ray	Team Tomko	5:00
4	Rhino	Team Cage	7:00
5	James Storm	Team Tomko	9:00
6	Kevin Nash	Team Cage	11:00
7	Brother Devon	Team Tomko	13:00
8	Matt Morgan	Team Cage	15:00
9	Tomko	Team Tomko	17:00
10	Sting	Team Cage	19:00
