= AJ Styles and Tomko =

Professional wrestling tag team

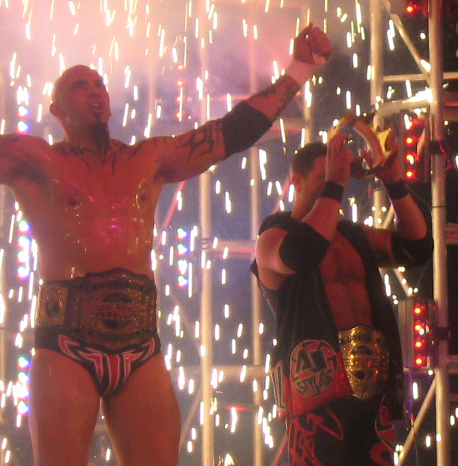
- Tomko and Styles in March 2008

Tag team
- Members: AJ Styles; Tomko
- Name: AJ Styles and Tomko; Christian's Coalition; The Angle Alliance
- Debut: March 29, 2007
- Disbanded: May 22, 2008

AJ Styles and Tomko were a tag team in Total Nonstop Action Wrestling (TNA) active from early 2007 to mid-2008. The duo initially aligned as members of the Christian's Coalition faction before defecting to the rival Angle Alliance in November 2007. Over the course of their tenure, Styles and Tomko held the TNA World Tag Team Championship on one occasion.

== History ==
=== Formation ===
By early 2007, after Tomko's then-recent arrival reprising his WWE role as Christian Cage's enforcer resulted in Christian regaining the NWA World Heavyweight Championship, Christian would expand his leadership into a full coalition to enforce his reign. While Scott Steiner would officially come on board as Cage's "consultant", recently turned villain A.J. Styles would align himself with Christian on occasion. Styles and Tomko, however, would have yet to interact, as Styles' appearances alongside Christian came without Tomko present.

Immediately following Destination X 2007, the champion Christian and Kurt Angle were informed by TNA management director Jim Cornette that they would each be captaining five-man teams to compete in a Lethal Lockdown cage match at the upcoming pay-per-view Lockdown. In the upcoming weeks, Christian's Coalition, which had somewhat broken down by Destination X, officially formed for the second time in as many months under the name Team Cage, also including Abyss and Steiner along with Styles and Tomko (the latter whose rejoining finally united the duo), while Team Angle went on to consist of four recent rivals of the Team Cage members (Angle included) and Jeff Jarrett. At the match itself, Team Angle won when Jarrett hit Abyss with a thumbtack-loaded guitar and let Sting make the pin to become number one contender to Cage's title. From there, the collective would systematically betray and destroy Abyss, and eventually Scott Steiner and Tomko's trust issues would cause Steiner to leave to team with his brother Rick, all of which in effect left only Styles and Tomko to carry on together behind Cage as Christian's Coalition.

=== Growing Feuds ===
Tension would develop between Styles, Tomko, and Cage heading into the King of the Mountain match at Slammiversary, which all three men were in qualifying for. On May 31, 2007, Styles had originally been scheduled to face Jeff Jarrett in a qualifying match, but since Jarrett couldn't appear due to his wife's death, Tomko was put in his place. Styles defeated Tomko thanks to "botched" interference from Christian Cage, causing tension between Tomko and Cage, later resolved on the June 7 episode. On the June 14, 2007 episode of Impact, Styles and Tomko showed that they were once again a united front, helping Cage defeat Abyss by disqualification to get into King of the Mountain after Abyss hit him with a steel chair. The group came out empty-handed at Slammiversary, and Styles and Tomko lost to Sting and Abyss in a tag team match at the following pay-per-view, Victory Road.

After being attacked by Judas Mesias and the Robert Roode-assisted Coalition, Sting and Abyss overcame Styles and Cage to secure a contract for an Abyss vs. Christian match at Hard Justice 2007 with the help of the TNA debut of "The Punisher" Andrew Martin to counteract Tomko's Coalition enforcer role. On the Impact! prior to Hard Justice, Jim Cornette announced that Christian's Coalition would take on Abyss, Sting and Andrew Martin in a Doomsday Chamber of Blood match, a barbed wire steel cage match in which a person could only be pinned once they were bleeding, at Hard Justice in which the wrestler who scores the pinfall for his team in the match would receive the next title shot at the TNA World Heavyweight Championship. At Hard Justice, Styles was pinned by Abyss as the Coalition lost. Styles and Tomko next accompanied Christian in his feud with Samoa Joe over who the "real World Heavyweight Champion" was.

=== TNA World Tag Team Champions ===
At No Surrender, Styles and Tomko won a ten-team Gauntlet Match to become the number one contenders for the TNA World Tag Team Championship at Bound for Glory against the team of Adam "Pacman" Jones and Ron Killings; Styles started the match against his former tag team partner Christopher Daniels (and would align with him against various opponents during the match), survived the entire over-the-top elimination portion, and even picked up the winning pinfall for himself and Tomko. At Bound For Glory, Styles and Tomko defeated Killings and Rasheed Lucius "Consequences" Creed, Pacman's surprise substitute, for the TNA Tag Team Titles. At this point they were still solidly Christian's enforcers in his feud with Samoa Joe and later his Fight for the Right Tournament efforts, but were also branching out on their own and establishing their act as a tag team, even becoming somewhat popular with the audience despite their villainous status.

After retaining the tag titles against the Steiner Brothers at Genesis, Styles and Tomko came out during Christian's number one contendership ladder match with Kaz right as Cage was about to win, despite his specific instructions not to. This distracted Cage, costing him the match. Immediately afterwards, they assisted Kurt Angle in retaining his TNA World Heavyweight Championship, officially joining Kurt and his wife Karen in the Angle Alliance. The hopeless dreamer Styles and major skeptic Tomko from then on would attempt to be part of both the Angle Alliance and the Christian Coalition, despite the clashing egos and animosity between Christian and the Angles. It was implied during that time that Karen, who'd been shown on-screen to have a seducing effect on A.J. on occasion, conned him into thinking this union was possible.

On the December 6, 2007 Impact!, when Cage's leadership-conditioned attempt to follow Robert Roode into accepting Angle's offer to join the group backfired after one match and led to his betrayal at the hands of Angle and Roode, Styles tried in vain to hold the assailants back by himself as Tomko walked away from the situation. At that point, Cage was out of the Alliance, but Styles and Tomko's status was unknown regarding both the Alliance or the Coalition. On the following episode of Impact! Cage was again attacked by Angle and Roode but this time an upset looking Styles just watched from the ring apron.

In following weeks, Tomko made it clear to Styles that they needed to choose sides, and while Styles was indecisive, Tomko firmly established his own foothold in the situation by leaving both the Coalition and the Alliance on the January 3, 2008 episode of Impact!. Styles later succumbed to Karen's seductions once again and chose to join Angle at the Final Resolution pay-per-view by helping Angle retain the TNA World Championship against Cage. Following Final Resolution, Angle and Styles continued to try to recruit Tomko, only to be rebuffed each time, eventually leading to Tomko attacking Angle after he insulted Tomko's wife over Karen and appearing to side with Christian leading up to the title rematch between Angle and Cage. At Against All Odds, Tomko and Styles surprisingly showed no signs of conflict in their defense of the Tag Team Titles, and in the end Tomko cost Cage the championship again in the main event. He subsequently joined the Angle Alliance on the next Impact!, his reasoning being simply because there was strength in numbers and he was tired of years of yet-incompletely-fulfilled promises of stardom under Christian Cage.

At Destination X, the Angle Alliance faced the makeshift "Unlikely Alliance" consisting of the vengeful Christian, Samoa Joe, and Kevin Nash. The Angle Alliance fell as Tomko tapped out to Joe that night. The next Thursday on Impact!, Tomko was announced the captain of the villainous Lethal Lockdown team. Tomko and his pre-recruited teammate Styles would enlist Team 3D and James Storm in the coming weeks, only to lose to Christian's team of Nash, Rhino, Sting, and Matt Morgan.

On the April 17, episode of Impact! Styles and Tomko finally lost the TNA World Tag Team Championship to Super Eric and Kaz. Afterwards they complained to Jim Cornette about the match, and in the end Super Eric and Kaz were stripped of the championships due to Super Eric being unable to realize he and Eric Young (who was slated as Kaz's partner) were one and the same. The Deuces Wild tournament was organized, but Tomko had been suspended by TNA (due to no-showing a TNA Fanfest Event - his absence was explained in the storyline as having been injured in a shoot fight). Therefore, Styles competed in the tournament alongside Super Eric.

=== Falling outs ===
On the May 22, 2008 episode of Impact!, after Tomko interrupted an interview to interrogate Styles about teaming with Super Eric, Styles quit the Angle Alliance, including his team with Tomko, in a fit induced by Styles having faced many pointed fingers in recent weeks mainly pertaining to his relationship with Karen. From there, Tomko would align with Kurt Angle and characters such as Booker T, Team 3D, and The Beautiful People in a loose collective self-identified as "the Bad Guys". That same night, and the following week, Angle, Booker, Team 3D and Tomko ended the show by viciously attacking Styles (and Cage in the second week), marking the official disbandment of Styles and Tomko as a tag team. Tomko departed TNA in July 2008, appearing once against Samoa Joe on the way out, while A.J.'s rivalry with Kurt Angle would continue for over a year, most notably through his constant role in resistance efforts against the Main Event Mafia.

On the December 17, 2009 edition of Impact!, the newly-reigning World Heavyweight Champion Styles and Tomko teamed with Angle, Bobby Lashley, and Abyss, and came out victorious in a 10-man tag team match - Tomko's official return match with TNA after over a year away - when Styles pinned Brutus Magnus of the British Invasion. This loose alliance wouldn't last, however, as Tomko later revealed himself to have been the masked man in black assaulting A.J. for months after Bound for Glory, successfully goading his former partner's attention and a title opportunity. Styles defeated Tomko to retain his title and end the feud on January 4, 2010.

== Championships and accomplishments ==
- Total Nonstop Action Wrestling
  - TNA World Tag Team Championship (1 time)
  - Gauntlet for the Gold (2007 – Tag Team)
