= Victory Road (2007) =

2007 Total Nonstop Action Wrestling pay-per-view event

- DVD cover featuring Kurt Angle, Samoa Joe, Brother Ray and Brother Devon
- Promotion: Total Nonstop Action Wrestling
- Date: July 15, 2007
- City: Orlando, Florida
- Venue: Impact Zone
- Attendance: 900

Pay-per-view chronology
← Previous; Slammiversary	Next → Hard Justice

Victory Road chronology
← Previous; 2006	Next → 2008

The 2007 Victory Road was a professional wrestling pay-per-view (PPV) event produced by Total Nonstop Action Wrestling (TNA), which took place on July 15, 2007, at the Impact Zone in Orlando, Florida. It was the third event under the Victory Road chronology. Eight matches were featured on the event's card.

== Storylines ==
Victory Road featured ten professional wrestling matches and two pre-show matches that involved different wrestlers from pre-existing scripted feuds and storylines. Wrestlers portrayed villains, heroes, or less distinguishable characters in the scripted events that built tension and culminated in a wrestling match or series of matches.

Other on-screen personnel
Role:	Name:
Commentator	Mike Tenay
Commentator	Don West
Interviewer	Jeremy Borash
Ring announcer	Jeremy Borash
Ring announcer	David Penzer
Referee	Earl Hebner
Referee	Rudy Charles
Referee	Mark "Slick" Johnson
Referee	Andrew Thomas

== Results ==
No.	Results	Stipulations	Times
1^{D}	Serotonin (Havok and Martyr) defeated Akira Raijin and Brute Issei	Tag team match	4:20
2	Christopher Daniels defeated Jay Lethal, Puma, Homicide, Sonjay Dutt, Petey Williams, Shark Boy, Elix Skipper, Kaz and Senshi	Ultimate X Gauntlet match to determine the #1 contender to the TNA X Division Championship	18:48
3	The Voodoo Kin Mafia (B.G. James and Kip James) (with Roxxi Laveaux) defeated Basham and Damaja (with Christy Hemme and Lance Hoyt)	Tag team match	7:03
4	James Storm defeated Rhino	Singles match	10:26
5	The Motor City Machine Guns (Chris Sabin and Alex Shelley) (with Kevin Nash) defeated Jerry Lynn and Bob Backlund	Tag team match	8:44
6	Eric Young and Gail Kim defeated Robert Roode and Ms. Brooks	Mixed tag team match	8:17
7	Christian Cage defeated Chris Harris	Singles match	13:58
8	Sting and Abyss defeated A.J. Styles and Tomko	Tag team match	15:33
9	Kurt Angle (World) and Samoa Joe (X Division) defeated Team 3D (Brother Ray and Brother Devon) (Tag Team)	Tag team match for the TNA World Heavyweight, X Division and World Tag Team Championships	18:25
D / – this was a dark match
