= Christian Coalition =

Christian Coalition may refer to:

- Christian Coalition of America
- Christian Coalition (New Zealand)
- Australian Christian Lobby, previously called the Australian Christian Coalition
- Christian's Coalition, a now defunct professional wrestling stable in Total Nonstop Action Wrestling
