= TNA Lockdown (2007) =

2007 Total Nonstop Action Wrestling pay-per-view event

Lockdown (2007)
- Promotional poster featuring various TNA wrestlers
- Promotion: Total Nonstop Action Wrestling
- Date: April 15, 2007
- City: St. Charles, Missouri
- Venue: Family Arena
- Attendance: 6,000
- Tagline: "Every War Ends in the Cage"

Pay-per-view chronology
← Previous; Destination X	Next → Sacrifice

Lockdown chronology
← Previous; 2006	Next → 2008

The 2007 Lockdown was a professional wrestling pay-per-view (PPV) event produced by Total Nonstop Action Wrestling, which took place on April 15, 2007, at the Family Arena in Saint Charles, Missouri. This was the second monthly pay-per-view, after Bound for Glory (2006), to be held outside Orlando, Florida. It was the third annual event under the Lockdown chronology. Eight professional wrestling matches were featured on the event's card. In the theme of Lockdown events, every match took place inside a steel structure with six sides, known as Six Sides of Steel. It was the final TNA Wrestling pay-per-view event to officially feature National Wrestling Alliance championships (although the physical belts were used at the following Sacrifice event, the titles had been vacated by the NWA in the morning of the day of the event).

== Event ==
Other on-screen personnel
Role:	Name:
Commentator	Mike Tenay
Commentator	Don West
Interviewer	Jeremy Borash
Ring announcer	Jeremy Borash
Ring announcer	David Penzer
Referee	Earl Hebner
Referee	Rudy Charles
Referee	Mark Johnson
Referee	Andrew Thomas

== Results ==
No.	Results	Stipulations	Times
1^{P}	The Voodoo Kin Mafia (B.G. James and Kip James) (with Lance Hoyt) defeated Serotonin (Kaz and Havok) (with Christy Hemme and Martyr)	Six Sides of Steel match	3:35
2	Chris Sabin (c) defeated Jay Lethal (with Kevin Nash), Sonjay Dutt, Alex Shelley and Shark Boy	Xscape match for the TNA X Division Championship	15:50
3	Robert Roode (with Ms. Brooks and Eric Young) defeated Petey Williams	Six Sides of Steel match	10:14
4	Gail Kim defeated Jackie Moore	Six Sides of Steel match	7:13
5	Senshi defeated Austin Starr	Six Sides of Steel match with Bob Backlund as special guest referee	9:57
6	James Storm defeated Chris Harris	Six Sides of Steel Blindfold match	9:05
7	Christopher Daniels defeated Jerry Lynn	"Wrath of X" Six Sides of Steel match	13:29
8	Team 3D (Brother Ray and Brother Devon) defeated Latin American Xchange (Homicide and Hernandez) (c)	Electrified Six Sides of Steel match for the NWA World Tag Team Championship	15:36
9	Team Angle (Kurt Angle, Samoa Joe, Rhino, Sting and Jeff Jarrett) defeated Team Cage (Christian Cage, A.J. Styles, Scott Steiner, Abyss and Tomko) (with James Mitchell)	Lethal Lockdown match with Harley Race as gatekeeper	28:04
(c) / – the champion(s) heading into the match; P / – the match was broadcast on the pre-show

=== Xscape match ===
1.

Elimination no.	Wrestler	Eliminated by	Notes
1	Shark Boy	Alex Shelley	Pinned after a Simultaneous diving leg drop by Sabin and a diving splash by Shelley combination
2	Sonjay Dutt	Chris Sabin	Pinned after a Cradle Shock
3	Alex Shelley	Jay Lethal	Pinned after a Hail to the King
Loser	Jay Lethal	n/a	Lethal failed to escape the cage and touch the floor before Sabin
Winner	Chris Sabin (c)	N/A	Sabin escaped the cage and touched the floor before Lethal
