= Destination X (2008) =

2008 Total Nonstop Action Wrestling pay-per-view event

- Promotional poster featuring The Motor City Machine Guns (Alex Shelley [right] and Chris Sabin [left])
- Promotion: Total Nonstop Action Wrestling
- Date: March 9, 2008
- City: Norfolk, Virginia
- Venue: Norfolk Scope
- Attendance: 3,200

Pay-per-view chronology
← Previous; Against All Odds	Next → Lockdown

Destination X chronology
← Previous; 2007	Next → 2009

The 2008 Destination X was a professional wrestling pay-per-view (PPV) event produced by the Total Nonstop Action Wrestling (TNA) promotion, which took place on March 9, 2008, at the Norfolk Scope in Norfolk, Virginia. It was the fourth event under the Destination X chronology and the third event in the 2008 TNA PPV schedule. Eight professional wrestling matches were featured on the event's card, two of which involved championships, while one match was held prior to the event.

The main event was a Six Man Tag Team match where The Unlikely Alliance (Christian Cage, Kevin Nash, and Samoa Joe) defeated The Angle Alliance (Kurt Angle, A.J. Styles, and Tomko). On the undercard was an Elevation X match in which Rhino defeated James Storm. Robert Roode defeated Booker T in a Stand By Your Man Strap match. The team of Curry Man and Shark Boy defeated Team 3D (Brother Devon and Brother Ray) in a Fish Market Street Fight.

This event marked the second time the Elevation X match was used by TNA. Jason Clevett of the professional wrestling section of the Canadian Online Explorer rated the event a six of ten, lower than the seven out of ten given to the 2007 event's ranking by Chris Sokol.

== Production ==
=== Background ===
It was reported in December 2007 that Destination X was planned to be held on March 16 outside of the TNA Impact! Zone in Orlando, Florida. However, in January 2008 TNA announced that Destination X would be held on March 9 instead. TNA issued a press release in mid-January 2008 stating that Destination X would be held at the Norfolk Scope in Norfolk, Virginia on March 9, 2008. Tickets for the event went on sale January 25, 2008. In Demand listed a preview of Destination X in late-January 2008 promoting the return of the Elevation X match. TNA released a poster featuring The Motor City Machine Guns (Alex Shelley and Chris Sabin; MCMG) sometime prior to help promote the event. The song Life Story by the band Crash Anthem was used as the official theme for the show.

=== Storylines ===
Destination X featured eight professional wrestling matches and one match prior to the event that involved different wrestlers from pre-existing scripted feuds and storylines. Wrestlers portrayed villains, heroes, or less distinguishable characters in the scripted events that built tension and culminated into a wrestling match or series of matches.

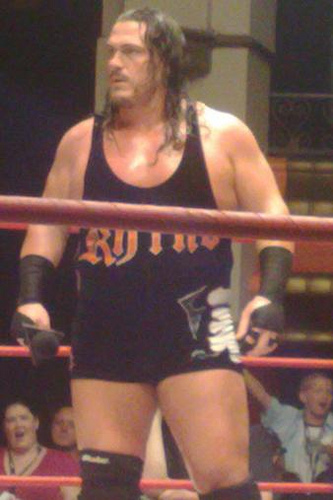
Rhino challenged James Storm to an Elevation X match at Destination X.

The main event at Destination X was a Six Man Tag Team match pitting The Unlikely Alliance of Christian Cage, Kevin Nash, and Samoa Joe against The Angle Alliance (Kurt Angle, A.J. Styles, and Tomko). The storyline behind this match was Joe's quest to win the TNA World Heavyweight Championship from Angle, with the two scheduled to fight for the title at TNA's next PPV event Lockdown on April 13, 2008. Also connected was Cage's feud with Styles and Tomko, after the two betrayed him and cost him the TNA World Heavyweight Championship twice against Angle in the storyline at TNA's Final Resolution PPV event on January 6, 2008, and at TNA's Against All Odds PPV event on February 10, 2008. This bout was announced on the February 21, 2008, episode of TNA's television program TNA Impact! during a backstage segment between Joe and Management Director Jim Cornette. On the March 6, 2008, episode of Impact!, the participants in the match fought in a series of matches to determine who would get a five-minute man advantaged at Destination X. Nash defeated Styles, Tomko defeated Joe in a First Blood match, and Cage defeated Angle in a Six Sides of Steel Cage match, leaving it two to three, with The Unlikely Alliance gaining the advantage.

TNA held the second-ever Elevation X match at Destination X between Rhino and James Storm. At Against All Odds, Rhino returned from injury to attack Storm during his encounter with Eric Young over the TNA World Beer Drinking Championship, reigniting their feud from mid-2007. Prior to this match, Rhino and Storm were involved in a storyline over past alcoholic issues by Rhino. This led to the two fighting at TNA's Victory Road PPV event on July 15, 2007, which Storm won. The two fought again at TNA's Hard Justice PPV event on August 12 in a Bar Room Brawl, which Storm also won. Rhino defeated Storm at TNA's No Surrender PPV event on September 9, 2007, thus ending the feud. In late 2007, Rhino suffered an injury sidelining him until his return at Against All Odds. On the February 14, 2008, episode of Impact! Rhino challenged Storm to an Elevation X match. The match was later promoted for the event by TNA.

Robert Roode versus Booker T in a Stand By Your Man Strap match was another highly promoted match heading into the event. The feud regarding this contest began at Final Resolution, where Roode accidentally punched Booker T's wife Sharmell, fracturing her jaw in the storyline, after a Mixed Tag Team match pitting Roode and his then-manager Ms. Brooks against Booker T and Sharmell. Booker T and Roode then fought at Against All Odds to a double count-out. Cornette announced on the February 14 episode of Impact! that Booker T and Roode would face in another match at Destination X. On the February 28, 2008, episode of Impact!, Roode handcuffed Booker T to the ring ropes and beat him with a belt, until Roode's former manager Ms. Brooks, now Traci Brooks, came to Booker T's defense. However, Roode and his new manager Payton Banks ended up attacking both with belts. On the March 6 episode of Impact!, Cornette announced that Booker T and Roode would face in a Stand By Your Man Strap match, in which if Booker T won then Brooks would be allowed to beat Banks with a strap ten times and vice versa.

Curry Man and Shark Boy fought Team 3D (Brother Devon and Brother Ray) in a Fish Market Street Fight at Destination X. At Against All Odds, Team 3D and Johnny Devine lost a Six Man Tag Team Street Fight to Jay Lethal and MCMG (Alex Shelley and Chris Sabin). Due to pre-match stipulations, Team 3D was then forced to work with a weight-limit in TNA in order to compete in matches, with the limit set at 275 lb (125 kg). On the February 14 episode ofImpact!, Team 3D fought Curry Man and Shark Boy in which Ray did not make weight, leaving Devon to face them alone. Devon won the contest after help from Ray. On the February 21, 2008, episode of Impact!, another match was held between the teams, in which Devon did not make weight, but Ray still won the bout after cheating. On the February 28 episode of Impact!, neither of Team 3D made weight, losing the match by disqualification. Curry Man and Shark Boy won a battle royal on the March 6 episode of Impact! to add a stipulation to a match between them and Team 3D at Destination X. The two chose that if Team 3D did not make weight then Team 3D would be forced to leave TNA, but if they did then the contest would be a Fish Market Street Fight.

The TNA Women's Knockout Championship was defended in a Three Way match by Awesome Kong against Gail Kim and ODB, also on the card. Build to this encounter began on December 2, 2007, at TNA's Turning Point PPV event, where then-TNA Women's Knockout Champion Kim defeated Kong by disqualification. Kim then fought Kong again at Final Resolution in a No Disqualification match, in which Kim retained the title. On the January 10, 2008, episode of Impact!, Kong defeated Kim to win the title in a match which gave Kim an injury in the storyline. Kong then defended the title against ODB at Against All Odds, which Kong won. Leading up to Destination X, Kim and ODB started a partnership in order to try and take the championship from Kong on the February 14 episode of Impact!. TNA later promoted a Three Way match between the three leading up to the event.

== Event ==
Prior to the show, TNA held a match for the crowd between Roxxi Laveaux and Angelina Love, which Roxxi won.

=== Miscellaneous ===
The event featured employees other than the wrestlers involved in the matches. Mike Tenay and Don West were the commentators for the telecast. Jeremy Borash and David Penzer were ring announcers for the event. Andrew Thomas, Earl Hebner, Rudy Charles, and Mark "Slick" Johnson participated as referees for the encounters. Crystal Louthan and Borash were used as interviewers during the event. Besides employees appearing in a wrestling role, Salinas, Christy Hemme, Rhaka Khan, Scott Steiner, Sonjay Dutt, SoCal Val, Raisha Saeed, Jim Cornette, Johnny Devine, Payton Banks, Traci Brooks, and Jackie Moore all appeared on camera, either in backstage or ringside segments.

=== Preliminary matches ===
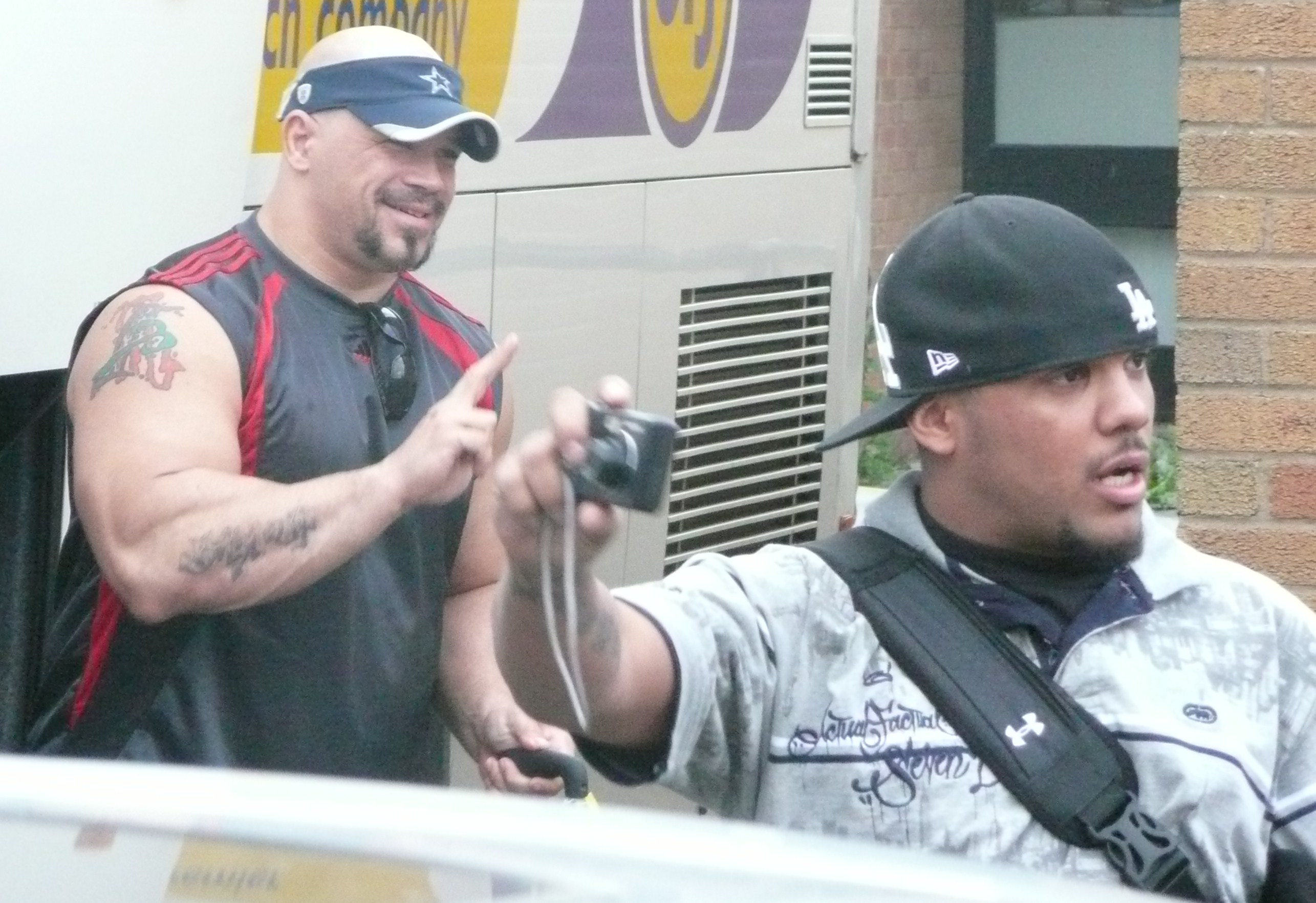
The Latin American Xchange (Homicide and Hernandez) became number one contenders to the TNA World Tag Team Championship at Destination X.

The event opened with a Three Way Tag Team match to determine the number one contenders to the TNA World Tag Team Championship between The Latin American Xchange (Hernandez and Homicide; LAX), who were accompanied by Salinas, MCMG (Alex Shelley and Chris Sabin), and The Rock 'n Rave Infection (Jimmy Rave and Lance Hoyt), who were accompanied by Christy Hemme. The bout lasted ten minutes and twenty-eight seconds. LAX won the bout thus becoming number one contenders after Hernandez pinned Rave following his signature Border Toss maneuver.

Jay Lethal defended the TNA X Division Championship against Petey Williams, who was accompanied by Rhaka Khan, in a contest lasting eleven minutes and forty-one seconds. Near the end of the bout, Khan distracted the referee, at which time Steiner came down to the ring and interfered in the match, allowing Williams to perform his signature Canadian Destroyer maneuver. SoCal Val then interfered as the referee was counting the pinfall, removing him from the ring. Khan began to chase Val, before Sonjay Dutt came to her rescue. When Williams went for another pin attempt, Lethal countered it into a small package pin, winning the match and retaining the TNA X Division Championship.

The team of Eric Young and Kaz were pitted against the team of Black Reign and Rellik in the third match. The duration of the encounter was ten minutes and three seconds. During the contest, Young left the ring, leaving Kaz to fight off both Reign and Rellik by himself. Later, Young returned to the ring dressed as a superhero, where he performed a double Death Valley Driver on Reign and Rellik slamming them both into the mat, thus winning the match.

A Three Way match for the TNA Women's Knockout Championship was held in which then-champion Awesome Kong, who was accompanied by Raisha Saeed defended the title against Gail Kim and ODB. Near the end, ODB was tripped by Saeed, which led to Kong performing her signature Awesome Bomb maneuver at eleven minutes and thirty-three seconds to win the contest.

=== Main event matches ===
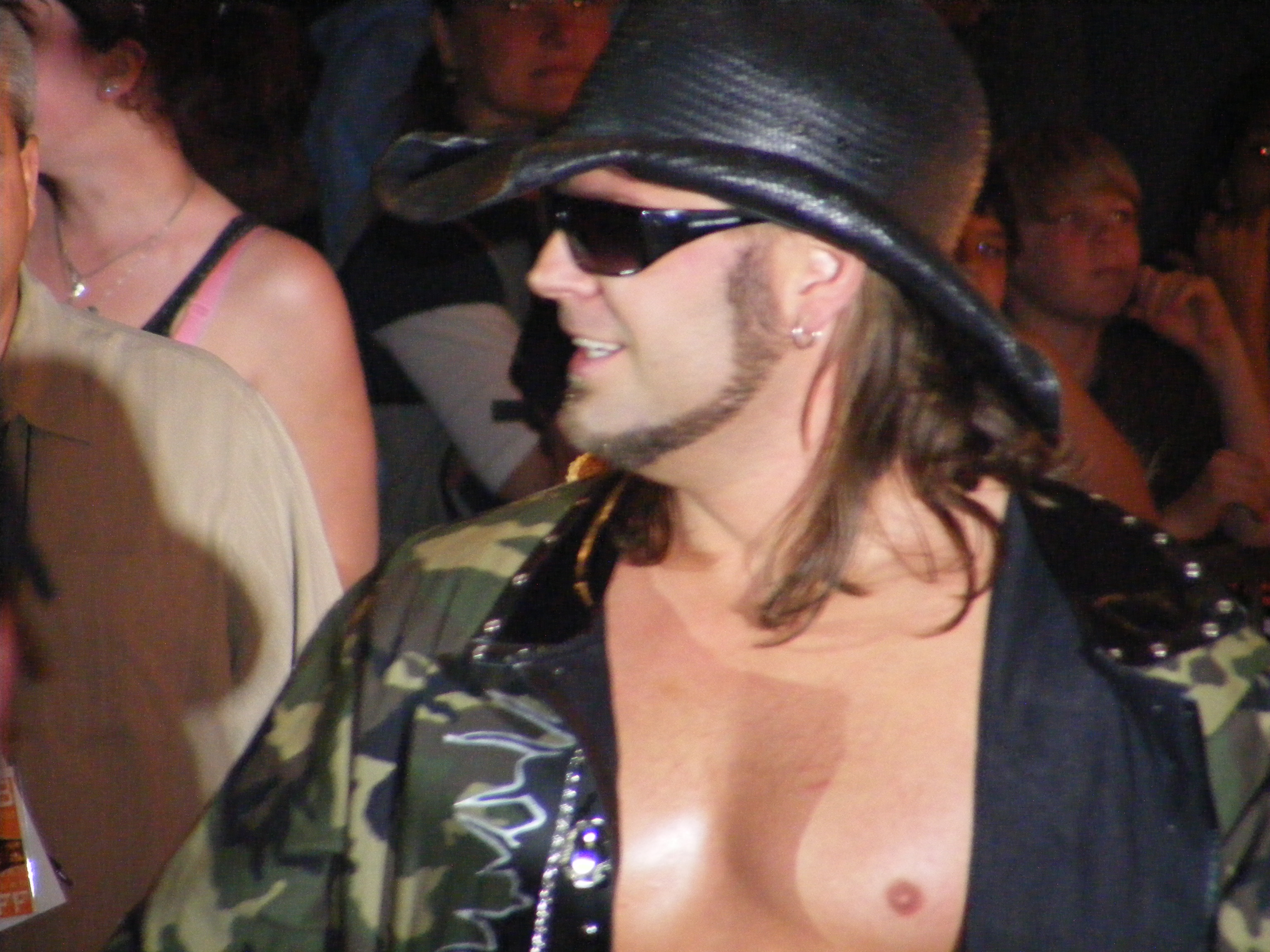
James Storm fought Rhino in an Elevation X match at Destination X.

The team of Curry Man and Shark Boy were pitted against Team 3D (Brother Devon and Brother Ray), who were accompanied by Johnny Devine, in a thirteen-minute-and-twelve-second Fish Market Street Fight. Prior to this bout, Management Director Jim Cornette announced that if Team 3D made weight, then the weight restriction on them would be lifted. Also, that Kurt Angle originally won the Six Sides of Steel Cage match against Christian Cage, however the decision with The Unlikely Alliance gaining the advantage in the Six Man Tag Team match was still in effect. Before the bout, both members of Team 3D were weighed, with both coming in below the mark. In a Fish Market Street Fight the match is won by pinfall or submission, in which there are no disqualifications and the ring area is covered by fish paraphernalia. Devine interfered in the match near the end, accidentally throwing white powder in Ray's face. This led to Shark Boy tossing him out of the ring and through a table. Afterwards, Ray mistakenly performed Team 3D's signature tag team maneuver the 3D on Devon with Curry Man, allowing Shark Boy to cover for the pinfall victory.

Robert Roode, who was accompanied by Payton Banks, fought Booker T, who was accompanied by Traci Brooks, in a Stand By Your Man Strap match. The duration of the contest was seven minutes and fifty-six seconds. In a Stand By Your Man Strap match, both competitors are connected with a ten-foot-long strap, with the match won by either pinfall or submission. Roode gained the pinfall after punching Booker T with a pair of handcuffs. After the match, Banks got to lash Brooks with a strap ten times, until Sharmell made her return attacking Roode and Banks with a strap.

The second-ever Elevation X match was held between Rhino and James Storm, who was accompanied by Jackie Moore. The bout lasted thirteen minutes and eighteen seconds. In an Elevation X match, both opponents fight on a scaffolding several feet above the ring, in which the only way to win is for one to fall off and down to the ring. The two brawled at ringside during the opening minutes. Rhino won the match after kicking Storm off the scaffold and down to the ring through a table.

The main event was a Six Man Tag Team match pitting The Unlikely Alliance (Christian Cage, Kevin Nash, and Samoa Joe) against The Angle Alliance (Kurt Angle, A.J. Styles, and Tomko). The match duration was twelve minutes and twenty-nine seconds. Angle was forced to sit out of the match for five minutes, giving The Unlikely Alliance the three on two advantage. Joe won the encounter after he forced Tomko to submit with his signature Coquina Clutch submission maneuver.

== Reception ==
A total of three thousand two hundred people attended the event. Canadian Online Explorer writer Jason Clevett rated the entire event a six out of ten, which was lower than the seven out of ten given to the 2007 Destination X event by Chris Sokol. Destination X's rating was lower than TNA's previous event Against All Odds, which was given a seven and a half out of ten. It was also lower than the six and a half given to TNA's next event Lockdown. Compared to rival World Wrestling Entertainment's WrestleMania XXIV PPV event held on March 30, 2008, Destination X was rated lower as WrestleMania was given a nine out of ten by Dale Plummer. The highest rating of Clevett's review, an eight out of ten, was given to the Women's Knockout Championship match and the Three Way Tag Team match. The Elevation X match received the lowest rating of the review with a zero out of ten. The main event was rated a five out of ten, while the Stand By Your Man Strap match was ranked a three out of ten. The Fish Market Street Fight was rated four out of ten. Clevett felt Destination X "was not a bad pay per view," but "it wasn’t particularly good." Wade Keller of the Pro Wrestling Torch, in his published review of the event, rated the main event three and one-quarter stars out of five, the Elevation X match one star out of five, the Stand By Your Man Strap match one and one-quarter stars out of five, and the Fish Market Street Fight two stars out of five. The Women's Knockout Championship match and the main event were the highest rated matches in the review, with the Elevation X match the lowest. Keller thought the main event was a "good six-man tag match, but it didn't feel substantial enough to be a PPV main event." Regarding the Elevation X match, Keller felt it was "pretty bad." Commenting on the Stand By Your Man Strap match, Keller said it was a "letdown." Remarking on the Women's Knockout Championship match, Keller thought that "in some ways, just excellent" and that it was a "strong showing again by these women." The event was released on DVD on May 13, 2008, by TNA Home Video.

== Aftermath ==
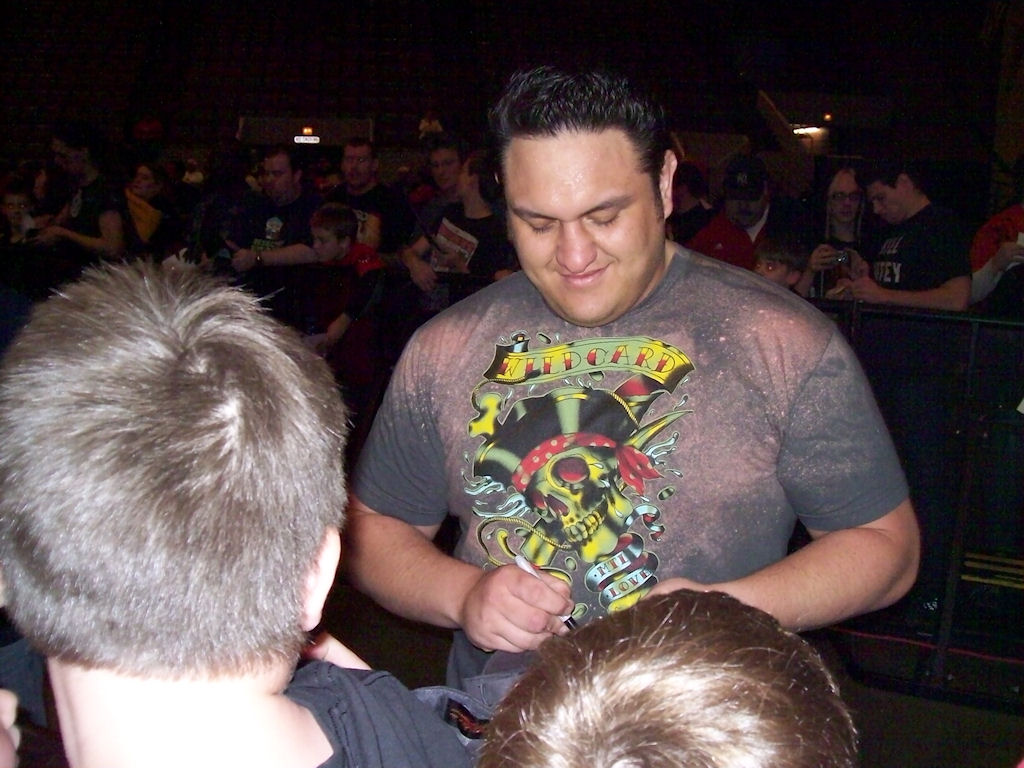
Samoa Joe defeated Kurt Angle in a Six Sides of Steel Cage match for the TNA World Heavyweight Championship at Lockdown.

Following Destination X, Samoa Joe went on to Lockdown on April 13, 2008, to face Kurt Angle in a Six Sides of Steel Cage match for the TNA World Heavyweight Championship. This match was announced on the March 13, 2008, episode of Impact! by Management Director Jim Cornette. On the April 10, 2008, episode of Impact!, a stipulation was added that if Joe lost he would retire from professional wrestling. At Lockdown, Joe defeated Angle to win the championship.

Christian Cage and Tomko were announced as the annual team captains in the 2008 Lethal Lockdown match by Cornette on the March 13 episode of Impact!. Over the weeks leading up to the event the two picked their team members, ending up with Team Cage consisting of Cage, Rhino, Kevin Nash, Sting, and Matt Morgan, while Team Tomko was made up of Tomko, A.J. Styles, James Storm, and Team 3D (Brother Devon and Brother Ray). At Lockdown, Team Cage defeated Team Tomko in a Five-on-Five Lethal Lockdown match.

With the return of Sharmell at Destination X, an Intergender Tag Team Six Sides of Steel Cage match was held at Lockdown, pitting Sharmell and Booker T against Payton Banks and Robert Roode. The bout was announced on the March 20, 2008, episode of Impact! by Cornette. Sharmell and Booker were the victors in the contest at Lockdown, thus ending the feud between Booker T and Roode.

TNA X Division Champion Jay Lethal went on to defend the title in an Xscape match at Lockdown. The match was promoted on the March 13 episode of Impact!, with qualifying matches held leading up to Lockdown. The wrestlers who qualified for the bout were Shark Boy, Curry Man, Johnny Devine, Sonjay Dutt, and Consequences Creed. Lethal ended up retaining the title at the event. Lethal eventually lost the title on the April 17, 2008, episode of Impact!, when Petey Williams used his TNA X Division Feast of Fired Title shot.

LAX (Hernandez and Homicide) became number one contenders to the TNA World Tag Team Championship at Destination X. They were given their championship match on the April 17 episode of Impact!, however at Lockdown the team of Eric Young and Kaz won a Cuffed in the Cage match earning them a championship match as well. Due to this, it became a Three Way Tag Team match between LAX, the team of Young and Kaz, and TNA World Tag Team Champions Styles and Tomko. Young and Kaz won the bout, however, due to a controversial finish the championship was vacated by Cornette. Cornette then set up the Deuces Wild Tag Team Tournament heading into TNA's Sacrifice PPV event on May 11, 2008, to crown new champions. LAX went on to the event to win the tournament, thus winning the championship.

In October 2017, with the launch of the Global Wrestling Network, the event became available to stream on demand.

== Results ==
No.	Results	Stipulations	Times
1^{P}	Roxxi Laveaux defeated Angelina Love	Singles match	—
2	The Latin American Xchange (Hernandez and Homicide) (with Salinas) defeated The Motor City Machine Guns (Alex Shelley and Chris Sabin) and The Rock 'n' Rave Infection (Jimmy Rave and Lance Hoyt) (with Christy Hemme)	Three-Way Dance to determine the #1 contenders to the TNA World Tag Team Championship	10:26
3	Jay Lethal (c) defeated Petey Williams (with Rhaka Khan)	Singles match for the TNA X Division Championship	11:39
4	Eric Young and Kaz defeated Black Reign and Rellik	Tag team match	10:03
5	Awesome Kong (c) (with Raisha Saeed) defeated Gail Kim and ODB	Three-Way Dance for the TNA Women's Knockout Championship	11:27
6	Curry Man and Shark Boy defeated Team 3D (Brother Devon and Brother Ray) (with Johnny Devine)	Fish Market Street Fight	13:13
7	Robert Roode (with Payton Banks) defeated Booker T (with Traci Brooks)	Stand By Your Man Strap match	7:56
8	Rhino defeated James Storm (with Jackie Moore)	Elevation X match	13:13
9	The Unlikely Alliance (Christian Cage, Kevin Nash, and Samoa Joe) defeated The Angle Alliance (A.J. Styles, Kurt Angle, and Tomko)	Six-man tag team match	12:26
(c) / – the champion(s) heading into the match; P / – the match was broadcast on the pre-show
