= Final Resolution (January 2008) =

2008 Total Nonstop Action Wrestling pay-per-view event

- Promotional poster featuring Kurt Angle, Tomko, A.J. Styles, and Christian Cage
- Promotion: Total Nonstop Action Wrestling
- Date: January 6, 2008
- City: Orlando, Florida
- Venue: TNA Impact! Zone
- Attendance: 900
- Tagline: Best Friends...Better Enemies

Pay-per-view chronology
← Previous; Turning Point (2007)	Next → Against All Odds (2008)

Final Resolution chronology
← Previous; Final Resolution (2007)	Next → Final Resolution (December 2008)

The January 2008 Final Resolution was a professional wrestling pay-per-view (PPV) event produced by the Total Nonstop Action Wrestling (TNA) promotion, which took place on January 6, 2008, at the TNA Impact! Zone in Orlando, Florida. It was the fourth event under the Final Resolution chronology; the first of two Final Resolution events held in 2008 and the last event held in January. It was the first event in the 2008 TNA PPV schedule. Eight professional wrestling matches were featured on the event's card, three of which involved championships.

The main event was for the TNA World Heavyweight Championship between then-champion Kurt Angle and the challenger Christian Cage. Angle ended up winning the bout, thus retaining the championship. A.J. Styles and Tomko defended the TNA World Tag Team Championship against the team of Kevin Nash and Samoa Joe on the card. Styles and Tomko retained the tag team championship in the encounter. The team of Johnny Devine and Team 3D (Brother Devon and Brother Ray) fought the team of Jay Lethal and The Motor City Machine Guns (Alex Shelley and Chris Sabin) in a Six Man Tag Team Ultimate X match. Devine and Team 3D were the victors in the contest. The TNA Women's Knockout Championship defense by Gail Kim against Awesome Kong in a No Disqualification match was another highly promoted match for the event. Kim won the bout, successfully retaining the title.

Mark Xamin of the professional wrestling section of the Canadian Online Explorer rated the event a six out of ten, the same rating given to the second Final Resolution event held in December, but lower than the seven and a half out of ten given to the 2007 event's ranking by Chris Sokol.

== Production ==
=== Background ===
Final Resolution was announced in mid-October 2007 to be taking place on January 6, 2008. The location for the gathering was not specified. In late-November 2007 the TNA Impact! Zone in Orlando, Florida was revealed as the location for the spectacle. TNA created a section regarding their event on their website to help promote the event. TNA released a poster featuring Kurt Angle, Christian Cage, A.J. Styles, and Tomko sometime prior to help promote the event. TNA moved Final Resolution to December later in the year and held a second event for unknown reasons.

=== Storylines ===
Final Resolution featured eight professional wrestling matches that involved different wrestlers from pre-existing scripted feuds and storylines. Wrestlers portrayed villains, heroes, or less distinguishable characters in the scripted events that built tension and culminated in a wrestling match or series of matches.

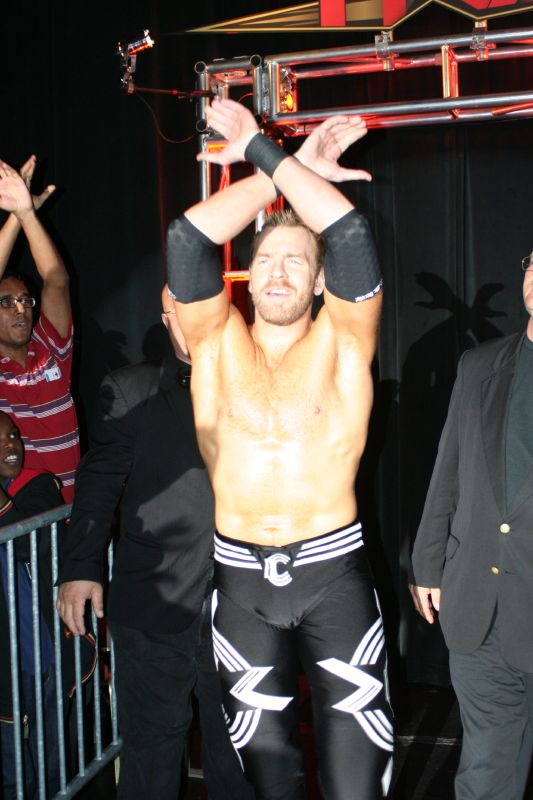
Christian Cage challenged Kurt Angle for the TNA World Heavyweight Championship at Final Resolution.

The main storyline heading into Final Resolution revolved around the group The Angle Alliance. On November 11, 2007, at TNA's Genesis PPV event partners in Christian's Coalition, A.J. Styles and Tomko, aided Kurt Angle in retaining the TNA World Heavyweight Championship in the main event without Coalition leader Christian Cage's consent. Afterwards on the November 15, 2007, episode of TNA's television program TNA Impact!, Styles and Tomko joined Angle in creating The Angle Alliance, while remaining tied to Cage. Styles followed by trying to join the two fractions together leading up to the December 6, 2007, episode of Impact!, where Cage became leader of a joint alliance, until Angle and Robert Roode attacked Cage later in the episode. On the December 20, 2007, episode of Impact!, Angle versus Cage for the title was promoted for Final Resolution.

Due to this storyline, the TNA World Tag Team Championship defense by A.J. Styles and Tomko against Samoa Joe and Kevin Nash was added to the event. The match was originally promoted to have been Scott Hall and Nash challenging for the titles, however this was changed for unknown reasons on the January 3, 2008, episode of Impact! by Management Director Jim Cornette. A narrative tied to this match involved Joe becoming angry with his position in the company and requesting more money and title opportunities due to Hall's no-showing of TNA's Turning Point event on December 2, 2007, and events that transpired as a result.

Robert Roode and Ms. Brooks facing Booker T and Sharmell in a Mixed Tag Team match was also promoted for the event. On the December 13 episode of Impact!, Sharmell came to Roode's manager Ms. Brooks' defense as she was being belittled by Roode for losing a match. This followed with weekly segments involving Sharmell, Brooks, and Roode on Impact!, leading to an encounter between Roode and Booker T on the December 27 episode of Impact!. However, before the encounter it was changed to a tag team match pitting Booker T and Christian Cage against Kurt Angle and Robert Roode for later in the episode, which the latter lost. On the January 3 episode of Impact!, the match was promoted by TNA to take place at Final Resolution.

A Six Man Tag Team Ultimate X match pitting the teams of Johnny Devine and Team 3D (Brother Devon and Brother Ray) against Jay Lethal and The Motor City Machine Guns (Alex Shelley and Chris Sabin) (MCMG) was another featured match on the card. This match was the result of Team 3D's feud with the TNA X Division. In October 2007, Team 3D began a storyline in which they were trying to eliminate the X Division. MCMG became their rivals in the thread with MCMG defeating Team 3D at Genesis. TNA X Division Champion Lethal later joined MCMG in the fight; around the same time, Devine turned on the division and joined Team 3D. The teams then fought in a Six Man Tag Team Tables match at Turning Point, which Devine and Team 3D won. The two teams fought again on the December 6, 2007, episode of Impact! in a Six Man Tag Team Ladder match, which Devine and Team 3D won. On the December 20, 2007, episode of Impact!, Lethal and MCMG defeated Devine and Team 3D in a Double North Pole match to determine the stipulation to their match at Final Resolution; choosing an Ultimate X match over a Plate glass Tables match. On the January 3, 2008, episode of Impact!, Team 3D attacked and injured MCMG in the storyline by beating their hands with kendo sticks.

The TNA Women's Knockout Championship was defended by Gail Kim against Awesome Kong in a No Disqualification match at Final Resolution. Kim first defended the title against Kong at Turning Point, which ended in a disqualification after Kong attacked the referee. On the December 6, 2007, episode of Impact!, Kong attacked Kim after Kim lost a bout to ODB, which led to a brawl that was broken up by security. The two had another brawl on the December 20, 2007, episode of Impact!. On the December 27, 2007, episode of Impact!, the match was announced to be taking place at Final Resolution.

== Event ==
=== Miscellaneous ===
The event featured employees other than the wrestlers involved in the matches. Mike Tenay and Don West were the commentators for the telecast. Jeremy Borash and David Penzer were ring announcers for the event. Andrew Thomas, Earl Hebner, Rudy Charles, and Mark "Slick" Johnson participated as referees for the encounters. Besides employees appearing in a wrestling role, Christy Hemme, Shelly Martinez, Angelina Love, Velvet Sky, Karen Angle, and Father James Mitchell all appeared on camera, either in backstage or ringside segments. Crystal Louthan and Borash were used as interviewers during the event. A series of backstage segments featured on the show had James Storm and Eric Young, with Jackie Moore, Borash, and Crystal as observers, competing in a beer drinking contest in which the winner would determine their match at the Against All Odds PPV event on February 10, 2008. The first was a "never have I ever" round, which Storm won. The second round was contested with both participants having beer bottles taped to their hands and not being allowed to go to the bathroom. Young won after Storm wet himself, which was confirmed by Moore. The third round involved the two taking shots, which was won by Storm after Young passed out due to Storm drugging him. With Storm winning two contests to one, he earned the ability to determine their match at Against All Odds.

=== Preliminary matches ===
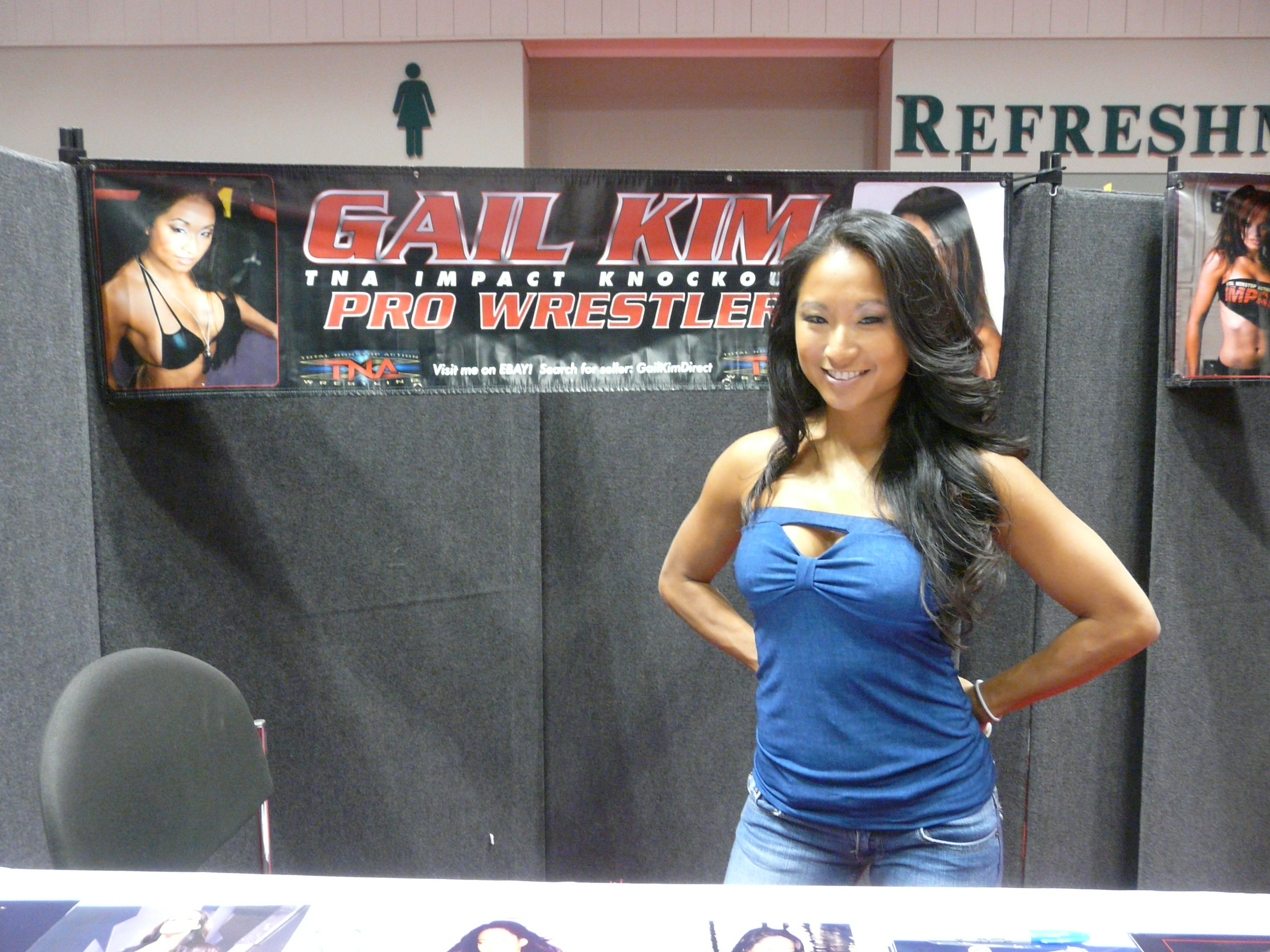
Gail Kim fought Awesome Kong in a No Disqualification match for the TNA Women's Knockout Championship at Final Resolution.

The first match of the event was between The Latin American Xchange (Hernandez and Homicide; LAX) and The Rock 'n Rave Infection (Jimmy Rave and Lance Hoyt), who were accompanied by Christy Hemme. The match lasted six minutes and forty-eight seconds before Hernandez performed his signature Border Toss maneuver from the top of a padded turnbuckle on Rave to gain the pinfall. After the contest, Shelly Martinez made her debut attacking Hemme and aligning herself with LAX.

A bout between Kaz and Black Reign was next on the card. The duration of the contest was seven minutes and twenty-eight seconds. Kaz won after countering a Reverse DDT by Black Reign, into a reverse DDT of his own to force the back of Black Reign's head into the mat for the pinfall. Afterwards, Kaz stole Black Reign's rat Misty.

Gail Kim defended the TNA Women's Knockout Championship against Awesome Kong in a No Disqualification match. It began with the two fighting throughout the crowd, before entering the ring. There, Kong performed her signature Awesome Bomb maneuver on the referee and followed by hitting him with a steel chair. Kim took the steel chair from Kong, bashed her over the back and head with it, before getting a near-fall which was counted by a replacement referee. Kong then proceeded to try an Awesome Bomb on the second referee, but was stopped by Kim as she attempted a roll-up pin which led to the three count and the retaining of the TNA Women's Knockout Championship at twelve minutes and forty-four seconds. Following the contest, Kong and Kim fought at ringside before it was broken up by security.

The fourth match pitted Judas Mesias, who was accompanied by Father James Mitchell, against Abyss. Abyss attempted to use a steel chair wrapped in barbed wire during the bout, but was stopped and it was taken away by the referee. Near the end, Abyss performed his signature Black Hole Slam maneuver on Mesias, however Mitchell distracted the referee from counting the pinfall. This allowed Mesias to spray red mist in Abyss' face and then follow by slamming Abyss face-first into the steel chair wrapped in barb-wire with his signature Straight to Hell maneuver at eleven minutes and three seconds.

=== Main event matches ===
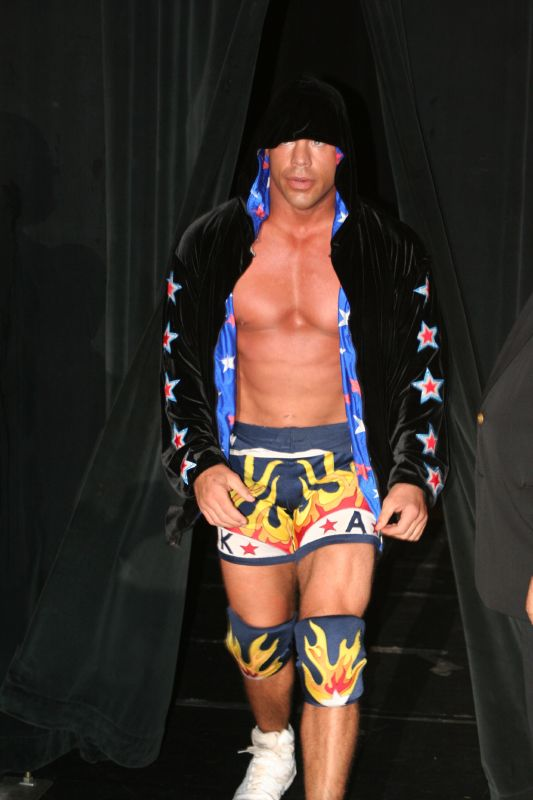
Kurt Angle defended the TNA World Heavyweight Championship against Christian Cage at Final Resolution.

Booker T and Sharmell fought Robert Roode and Ms. Brooks in a Mixed Tag Team match. The encounter lasted ten minutes and forty-seven seconds. Sharmell ended up getting the pinfall on Brooks with a roll up pin. After the contest, Roode blamed Brooks for the lost, which resulted in Brooks slapping Roode and Roode grabbing her by the hair. Sharmell then came to Brooks' defense, causing Roode to accidentally smack her in the face, knocking her out in storyline.

TNA held a Six Man Tag Team Ultimate X match pitting the team of Johnny Devine and Team 3D against the team of Jay Lethal and The Motor City Machine Guns. In an Ultimate X match, ropes are hung above the ring in a manner to form an "X", in which the objective is to climb the ropes and retrieve an object at the center of the "X". During the bout, Sabin and Shelley consistently could not climb the ropes due to the attack by Team 3D on the January 3, 2008, episode of Impact!. Due to their size, Ray nor Devon were able to climb the ropes, this led to Ray allowing Devon to stand on his shoulders in an attempt to do so. They were stopped by Lethal before winning the contest. Later, Ray grabbed a ladder which Devon set up in the ring under the TNA X Division Championship. After an attempt by MCMG and Lethal to stop them, Devine climbed the ladder and removed the X Division Championship belt. Afterwards, Ray disposed of the ladder before the referee saw, giving the win to Team 3D and Devine at twelve minutes and two seconds.

The TNA World Tag Team Championship was defended by the team of A.J. Styles and Tomko against the team of Kevin Nash and Samoa Joe in the seventh encounter, lasting twelve minutes and ten seconds. Near the end, Joe went to tag in Nash, who instead pulled his hand back, flipped Joe off, and left the ring. With Joe having to defend for himself, he fought off both Styles and Tomko before performing his signature Muscle Buster maneuver on Styles, gaining a near-fall that was broken up by Tomko. Tomko and Styles then performed their signature tag team Tornado–Plex maneuver forcing Joe into the mat to retain the TNA World Tag Team Championship.

The main event was for the TNA World Heavyweight Championship, in which then-champion Kurt Angle, who was accompanied by Karen Angle, fought Christian Cage. The duration of the match was eighteen minutes and forty-five seconds. Near the end, Angle performed his signature Angle Slam maneuver, resulting in a near-fall. Cage then performed his signature Unprettier maneuver, also resulting in a near-fall. Angle attempted his ankle lock submission maneuver which was countered by Cage into one of his own. Angle soon submitted to the hold, however the referee was distracted by the Karen. A.J. Styles ran down to the ring and pulled Karen away from the ring. Styles then hugged Cage, before springboarding off the top rope and bashing Cage in the back of the head with his forearm, effectively siding with The Angle Alliance. Angle then performed the Angle Slam to gain the victory and retain the TNA World Heavyweight Championship.

== Reception ==
A total of nine hundred people attended the event. Canadian Online Explorer writer Mark Xamin rated the entire event a six out of ten, which was lower than the seven and a half out of ten given to the 2007 Final Resolution event by Chris Sokol, but equal with the second Final Resolution held in December 2008 given by Bryan and Chris Sokol. Final Resolution's rating was lower than TNA's previous event Turning Point, which was given a six and half out of ten. It was also lower than the seven and half given to TNA's next event Against All Odds. Compared to rival World Wrestling Entertainment's Royal Rumble PPV event held on January 27, Final Resolution was rated lower as Royal Rumble was given an eight out of ten by Dale Plummer and Nick Tylwalk. In Xamin's review two matches were rated an eight out of ten, his overall highest rating given in the review. The first was the TNA Women's Knockout Championship defense by Gail Kim against Awesome Kong in a No Disqualification match. Xamin felt it was an "absolutely fantastic match" and that they showed "the world how good women's wrestling can be." The second match given this score was the main event between Kurt Angle and Christian Cage for the TNA World Heavyweight Championship. Xamin felt it was a "very solid match" and that they put on a "wrestling clinic." The TNA World Tag Team Championship match and the Six Man Tag Team Ultimate X match were both rated six out of ten. Xamin stated that in the Tag Team Championship match "Nash looked his age" despite the efforts of Joe and Styles doing "their best to carry the match"; although he felt it was still an "entertaining segment." Xamin also thought that due to Team 3D's creativity in the Ultimate X match they "stole the show in a match they had no business being in." Regarding the overall event, Xamin wrote that "Final Resolution was more about advancing storylines and entertainment value than it was about watching good wrestling." He also believed that Final Resolution had two "stand-out matches (Gail Kim vs Awesome Kong and Angle vs Christian Cage)" despite the rest of the card being "lacklustre[sic] at best."

Wade Keller of the Pro Wrestling Torch rated the main event and the Women's Knockout Championship match three and a three-quarter stars out of five. Keller gave the Tag Team Championship match a two and three-quarter stars out of five, while the Ultimate X match was given three stars out of five. The first two encounters of the event were both given one and a one-quarter stars out of five, the lowest ratings. When commenting on the main event Keller said the "first half wasn't stellar", but that the "second half was very good," although the "finish took away" from the match. Keller believed the Women's Knockout Championship encounter was an "excellent women's match." Speaking on the Tag Team Championship match, Keller said it was "good action," while the Ultimate X match as being "a fun match." The event was released on DVD on March 11, 2008, by TNA Home Video.

In 2021, the promotion ranked the Kim vs. Kong as the Nº1 of the Top 10 Knockouts Title Matches.

== Aftermath ==
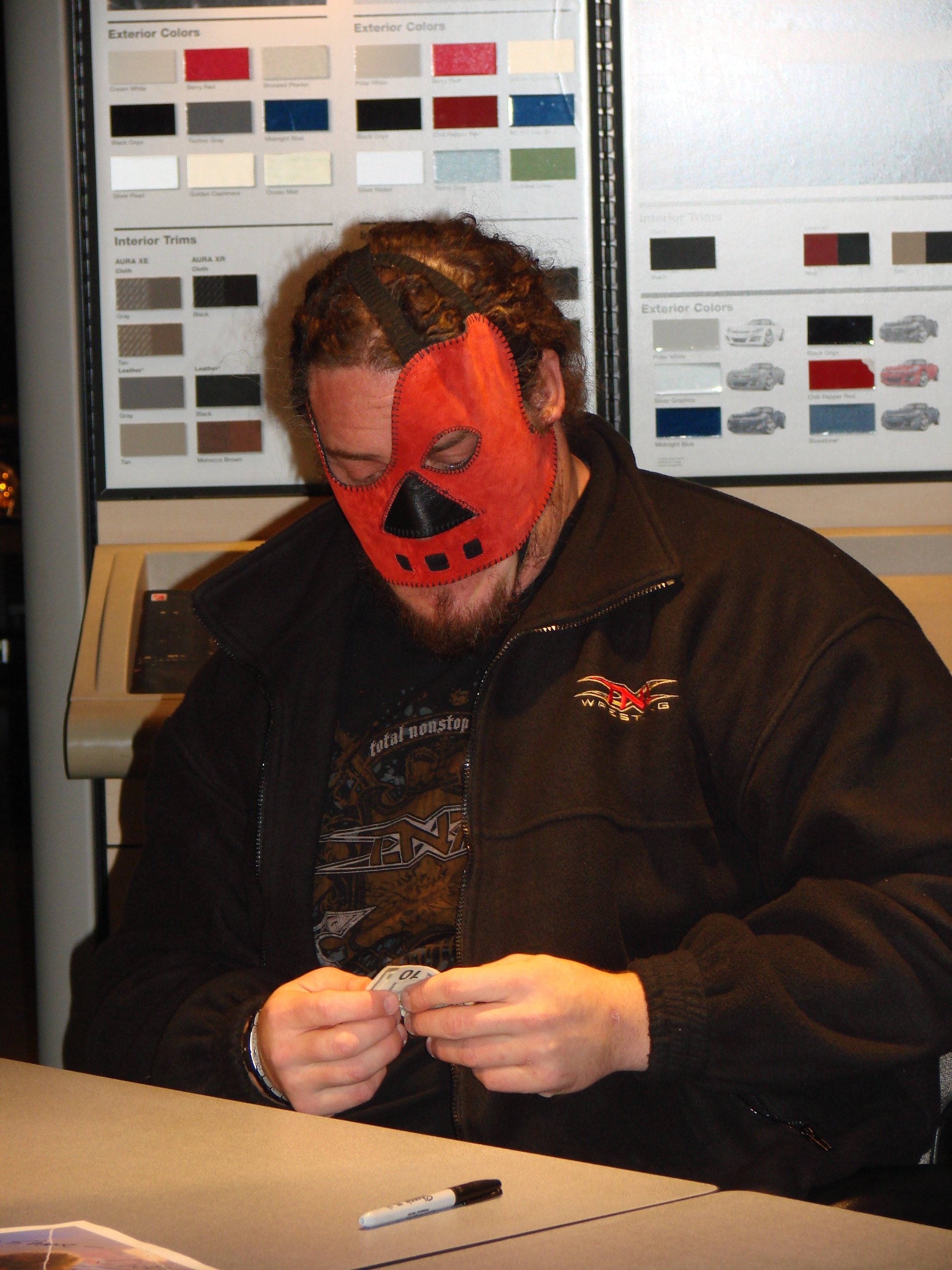
Abyss fought Judas Mesias in the second-ever Barbed Wire Massacre at Against All Odds.

There were technical difficulties in viewing the show for Cable providers supported by Shaw Pay-Per-View and Shaw Video On Demand.

After Final Resolution with Kurt Angle retaining the TNA World Heavyweight Championship, TNA had to determine who he would face at TNA's Against All Odds PPV event on February 10, 2008. On the January 17, 2008, episode of Impact!, Samoa Joe, Christian Cage, and A.J. Styles fought in a Three Way match to determine the number one contender. Stipulations for the match were that the winner would get a TNA World Heavyweight Championship match against Angle at Against All Odds, however if Styles won he could choose instead of the title match to allow Angle to not have to defend his title for two months. Cage ended up winning the contest, setting up Angle versus Cage at Against All Odds. On the January 24, 2008, episode of Impact!, Management Director Jim Cornette announced that Joe would be the Special Outside Enforcer at Against All Odds due him being controversially disqualified during the match. Angle defeated Cage at Against All Odds after interference from Tomko.

A.J. Styles and Tomko went on to Against All Odds to defend the TNA World Tag Team Championship against the team of Bob Armstrong and B.G. James. This match was announced on the January 24, 2008, episode of Impact! when the team announced they were using James' Feast or Fired World Tag Team Title shot. Styles and Tomko retained the title at Against All Odds.

On the January 10, 2008, episode of Impact!, Johnny Devine and Team 3D challenged Jay Lethal and MCMG to a Street Fight at Against All Odds, with the stipulation that if Team 3D won the X Division would disband, but if Lethal and MCMG won they would regain possession of the TNA X Division Championship and the X Division would continue to exist. On the January 17, 2008, episode of Impact!, Lethal and MCMG accepted the agreement but only after including that Team 3D would have to weigh less than 275 pounds in order to compete in their matches in TNA. At Against All Odds, Lethal and MCMG defeated Devine and Team 3D to save the X Division from disbandment.

Robert Roode and Booker T went on to fight at Against All Odds, which ended in a double count-out. At TNA's Destination X PPV event on March 9, 2008, Roode defeated Booker T in a Stand By Your Man Strap match. Sharmell returned after this encounter, resulting in an Intergender Tag Team Six Sides of Steel Cage match at TNA's Lockdown PPV event on April 13, 2008, pitting Roode and his new manager Payton Banks against Booker T and Sharmell, which the later team won.

Gail Kim defended the TNA Women's Knockout Championship against Kong once again on the January 10, 2008, episode of Impact!. Kong defeated Kim in the encounter, thus winning the championship.

Judas Mesias and Abyss continued their feud heading into Against All Odds. There, Abyss fought Mesias in the second-ever Barbed Wire Massacre. Abyss won the contest, ending the feud.

In October 2017, with the launch of the Global Wrestling Network, the event became available to stream on demand.

== Results ==
No.	Results	Stipulations	Times
1	The Latin American Xchange (Hernandez and Homicide) defeated The Rock 'n Rave Infection (Jimmy Rave and Lance Hoyt) (with Christy Hemme)	Tag Team match	6:48
2	Kaz defeated Black Reign	Singles match	7:28
3	Gail Kim (c) defeated Awesome Kong	No Disqualification match for the TNA Women's Knockout Championship	12:44
4	Judas Mesias (with Father James Mitchell) defeated Abyss	Singles match	11:03
5	Booker T and Sharmell defeated Robert Roode and Ms. Brooks	Mixed Tag Team match	10:47
6	Team 3D (Brother Devon and Brother Ray) and Johnny Devine defeated The Motor City Machine Guns (Alex Shelley and Chris Sabin) and Jay Lethal	Six-man tag team Ultimate X match	12:02
7	A.J. Styles and Tomko (c) defeated Kevin Nash and Samoa Joe	Tag Team match for the TNA World Tag Team Championship	12:10
8	Kurt Angle (c) (with Karen Angle) defeated Christian Cage	Singles match for the TNA World Heavyweight Championship	18:45
(c) / – the champion(s) heading into the match
