= Angle Alliance =

Professional wrestling stable

Stable
- Members: Kurt Angle (leader); Christian Cage (one-night leader); A.J. Styles; Tomko; Karen Angle; Robert Roode; Ms. Brooks; Jeremy Borash
- Name(s): Angle Alliance; Team Tomko
- Debut: November 11, 2007
- Disbanded: 2008

The Angle Alliance was a heel wrestling stable headed by Kurt Angle (and briefly Christian Cage on a self-proclaimed basis) in Total Nonstop Action Wrestling (TNA). For Lockdown 2008, in the absence of Kurt from the stable's activities, Tomko captained a subdivision under the name "Team Tomko".

== History (2007-2008) ==
=== Initial formation ===
The formation took place at Genesis when A.J. Styles and Tomko assisted Angle in helping him keep the TNA World Heavyweight Championship. Styles wanted to have the Angle Alliance and Christian's Coalition join forces; however, Cage denied Angle's request of being his "lackey", thus Styles and Tomko were dropped from the Coalition. After Angle offered membership to both Robert Roode and Christian, Roode quickly accepted while Cage stalled with insults towards all the members. He eventually followed suit under the condition that he became the leader, which the group apparently agreed to before Angle and Roode turned on and attacked him the same night, with Styles trying to hold them back and Tomko walking out on the scene. The next week Angle and Roode attacked Cage after the match again with Styles this time not helping his former captain. Roode was then simply phased out of the Alliance and concentrated on his own separate feud with Booker T. In the weeks following, Styles had to decide to be in either the Angle Alliance or Christian's Coalition. Two weeks before Final Resolution on an episode of TNA iMPACT!, Tomko left both groups stating that he wants to be his own man.

=== Turning on Christian ===
At Final Resolution, A.J. Styles finally decided to join the Angle Alliance, when he helped Angle retain his TNA World Heavyweight Championship against Cage, turning on his former captain for good after being seduced by Karen's charms and Kurt's power. On the following Impact!, Styles was rechristened as "(the) Prince (of Phenomenal)" A.J. Styles, with fellow Alliance members Kurt, Karen, and Jeremy Borash. After Cage came out running down Styles and Karen, both he and Samoa Joe, who came out next, claimed to deserve title shots. Before Joe and Christian could go down to the ring, Jim Cornette interrupted and announced a 3-way #1 contender's match between Cage, Joe, and Styles (where if Styles won, he could have an option to have a match with Kurt Angle and get Angle two months off from defending the world title until the April Lockdown PPV). Cage, however, won and earned the title match at February's Against All Odds. Angle then went on to attempt to get Tomko back in the Alliance, insulting Tomko's wife in the process. Tomko went on to brutally beat up Angle throughout the Impact Zone, then to defeat him in a one-on-one match with Styles as the referee and with assistance from Cage. At Against All Odds, Tomko cemented his place in the Alliance by costing Cage his last title opportunity.

=== Tensions with Karen Angle ===
On the following edition of Impact!, Tomko confirmed his membership in the stable, although he made it clear that he would do what he wanted and he was looking out for his own best interest not Angle's. Later, Samoa Joe and Kevin Nash interrupted Kurt and Karen's renewal of the vows, resulting in Kurt being stripped and chased off and Styles being in the ring with Karen instead when the dazed and confused priest "pronounced" the couple, temporarily making Styles her (kayfabe) second husband.

After losing to Christian, Joe, and Nash at Destination X, Tomko was told to captain a four-man team against a team headed by Cage for the Lethal Lockdown match at the upcoming Lockdown pay-per-view event. Tomko's team was quickly established as A.J. and Team 3D. Eventually James Storm was added to Team Tomko by TNA management assistant Matt Morgan, who revealed his true stripes as the fifth member of Team Cage at the end of the same night. During this time, Kurt Angle appeared to show support to Team Tomko, making Team 3D and Storm associates of the Angle Alliance; however, whenever Styles tried to help Karen and Kurt settle their marital issues, the latter refused, citing his title defense against Samoa Joe as a higher priority.

=== Split ===
At Lockdown, Kurt Angle was met by his wife Karen, who he promptly proceeded to throw out of the building so as to avoid any distractions. In the double main events, Angle lost his TNA World Heavyweight Championship to Samoa Joe, and Team Tomko was defeated by Team Cage with neither A.J. or Tomko involved in the decision.

After Lockdown, Styles and Tomko lost the TNA World Tag Team Championship to Eric Young and Kaz in a controversy involving Young and his "Super Eric" alter-ego, under which he pinned Styles, not recognizing each other as one and the same. This resulted in the championships being vacated. Tomko was not seen having any communication with Kurt Angle, and as he was away in Japan (figurative kayfabe; he was actually suspended for going there earlier in the midst of the Lockdown storyline and no-showing TNA's pre-Lockdown Fanfest), Styles tried to bring Karen to the Impact Zone, but Kurt had them thrown out as soon as he caught wind of it.

Meanwhile, the associates from the instantly dissolved Team Tomko would actually expand, as Storm would align himself with former Alliance member Robert Roode, forming what eventually became Beer Money, Inc., though when Styles needed a partner after Tomko was injured in a shoot fight in Japan (extended kayfabe for the suspension), both Storm and Roode refused. Styles would align with the fan favorite Super Eric instead. After Tomko returned from Japan and questioned Styles once again, A.J. had enough of the constant grilling and quit the Angle Alliance.

Accusing Styles of stealing Karen away whilst having no proof, Kurt Angle and Tomko then aligned with Team 3D as part of a loose collective of "bad guys" which at times had also included mostly every single important heel on the TNA roster at the time, most frequently Booker T, Johnny Devine, The Beautiful People (Angelina Love and Velvet Sky) and mixed martial artist Frank Trigg. Tomko later left TNA and came back for one last appearance, while Kurt eventually moved on to form a pact with several wrestling legends within TNA, creating the stable known as the Main Event Mafia.

The Angle Alliance had a one night reunion on the December 17, 2009 edition of Impact! in what was supposed to be a 10 man tag team match with Bobby Lashley and Abyss but ended up turning into essentially a 3-on-2 handicap match against the British Invasion after Lashley and Abyss took off with their then-rivals Scott Steiner, Dr. Stevie and Raven. Tomko, Angle, and Styles ended up winning the match after Styles pinned Brutus Magnus with a small package, only for Styles and Angle to be attacked afterward by Christopher Daniels and Desmond Wolfe while Tomko was exiting the arena.

== Championships and accomplishments ==
- Total Nonstop Action Wrestling

- TNA World Heavyweight Championship – Kurt Angle (1 time)
- TNA World Tag Team Championship – A.J. Styles and Tomko (1 time)
