= Hard Justice (2007) =

2007 Total Nonstop Action Wrestling pay-per-view event

- DVD cover featuring Kurt Angle
- Promotion: Total Nonstop Action Wrestling
- Date: August 12, 2007
- City: Orlando, Florida
- Venue: Impact Zone
- Attendance: 900
- Tagline: "All or Nothing..."

Pay-per-view chronology
| ← Previous; Victory Road | Next → No Surrender |

Hard Justice chronology
| ← Previous; 2006 | Next → 2008 |

The 2007 Hard Justice was a professional wrestling pay-per-view (PPV) event produced by Total Nonstop Action Wrestling (TNA), which took place on August 12, 2007 at the Impact Zone in Orlando, Florida. It was the third event under the Hard Justice chronology. Nine matches were featured on the event's card.

== Storylines ==
Hard Justice featured nine professional wrestling matches and two pre-show matches that involved different wrestlers from pre-existing scripted feuds and storylines. Wrestlers portrayed villains, heroes, or less distinguishable characters in the scripted events that built tension and culminated in a wrestling match or series of matches.

The show included the reintroduction of the wrestler formerly known as Goldust as Black Reign.

Other on-screen personnel
| Role: | Name: |
|---|---|
| Commentator | Mike Tenay |
| Commentator | Don West |
| Interviewer | Jeremy Borash |
| Ring announcer | Jeremy Borash |
| Ring announcer | David Penzer |
| Referee | Earl Hebner |
| Referee | Rudy Charles |
| Referee | Mark Johnson |
| Referee | Andrew Thomas |

== Results ==
Fixed Typo
| No. | Results | Stipulations | Times |
|---|---|---|---|
| 1 | Jay Lethal and Sonjay Dutt defeated Chris Sabin and Alex Shelley and Triple X (Christopher Daniels and Senshi) (with Elix Skipper) | X Division Triple threat Tag team match | 15:50 |
| 2 | Kaz defeated Raven (with Havok and Martyr) | Singles match | 5:41 |
| 3 | James Storm (with Jackie Moore) defeated Rhino | Bar Room Brawl | 13:15 |
| 4 | The Latin American Exchange (Homicide and Hernandez) defeated The Voodoo Kin Mafia (B.G. James and Kip James) (with Roxy Laveaux) | Tag team match | 5:50 |
| 5 | Robert Roode (with Ms. Brooks) defeated Eric Young | Humiliation match | 9:31 |
| 6 | Chris Harris defeated Black Reign by disqualification | Singles match | 4:50 |
| 7 | The Steiner Brothers (Rick Steiner and Scott Steiner) defeated Team 3D (Brother Ray and Brother Devon) | Tag team match | 11:00 |
| 8 | Abyss, Andrew Martin and Sting defeated Christian's Coalition (Christian Cage, A.J. Styles and Tomko) | Doomsday Chamber of Blood match. Since Abyss got the pin he became the #1 contender to the TNA World Heavyweight Championship at No Surrender | 10:51 |
| 9 | Kurt Angle (TNA World & IWGP Heavyweight Champion) defeated Samoa Joe (X Division & Tag Team Champion) | Singles match for the TNA World Heavyweight, IWGP Heavyweight, TNA X Division and TNA World Tag Team Championships | 18:34 |
