= Christian's Coalition =

Professional wrestling stable

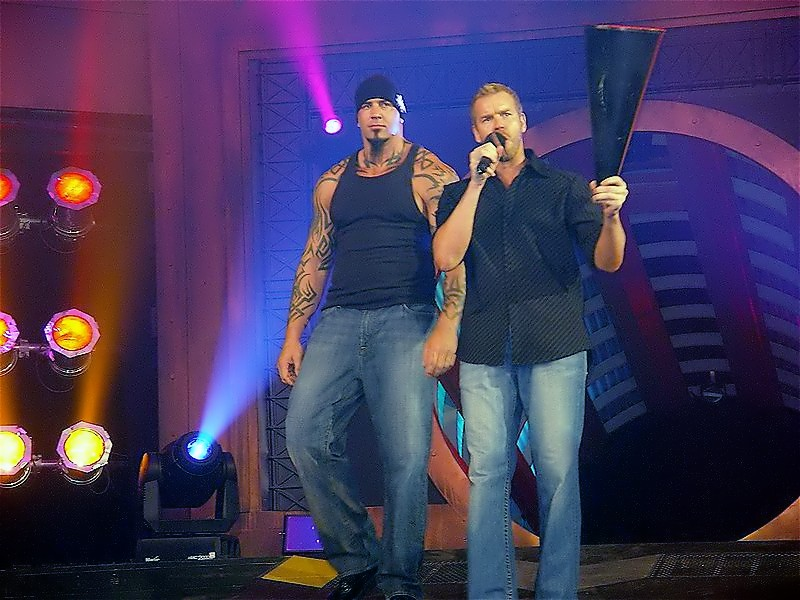
- Tomko (left) and Christian Cage (right)

Stable
- Name(s): Christian's Coalition; Team Cage (TNA Lockdown)
- Former member: See members
- Debut: February 8, 2007; March 13, 2008
- Disbanded: January 6, 2008; April 13, 2008

Christian Coalition or Team Cage was a villainous professional wrestling faction led by Christian Cage. Originally founded in Total Nonstop Action Wrestling (TNA) as the Christian Coalition, after originally disbanding of the stable, the Team Cage name was used at TNA's Lockdown for Christian's teams.

The Christian Coalition name was recycled from Christian and Tomko in World Wrestling Entertainment (WWE), where they referred to Christian's fan base as the Christian Coalition.

== History ==
=== Formation ===
Reprising that shared role between the two started from 2004 to 2005 in WWE, Christian Cage originally brought Tomko in to TNA as a personal enforcer in late-2006 to help him regain the NWA World Heavyweight Championship. It proved a smart move on his part when Tomko helped him defeat reigning champion Abyss and Sting in a triple threat elimination match at the January 2007 Final Resolution pay-per-view event.

During the same event, Kurt Angle became the number one contender to the NWA World Heavyweight title and moved into a feud with Cage. To prepare for his match with Angle, Cage brought Scott Steiner in as a "trainer", citing an intense dislike Steiner had for Angle at the time (which Steiner later explained as all contract negotiations involving himself having been put on indefinite hold by Angle's coming to TNA). This also proved to be good strategy when the "Christian Coalition", as the three men now referred to themselves, helped Cage retain his title at February's Against All Odds.

Although all three men were working together on Cage's behalf, from the start there was dissension evident. Tomko frequently commented on his distrust and dislike of Steiner, and after he won a match over new number one contender Samoa Joe on an episode of Impact!, Tomko began demanding a shot at Cage's title. Later he took a (kayfabe) sudden trip to Japan (which had actually been set up well in advance, to compete for the IWGP Tag Team Championship along with Giant Bernard) that coincided with the Destination X pay-per-view. During the event Steiner also abandoned Cage prior to his main event match, forcing him to seek out a replacement enforcer for the event. He would be unsuccessful in that venture, yet still manage to defeat Samoa Joe to retain his NWA World Heavyweight title.

=== Team Cage (2007) ===
Immediately following Destination X, Cage and Kurt Angle were informed by TNA management director Jim Cornette that they would each be captaining five-man teams to compete in a Lethal Lockdown cage match at the upcoming PPV Lockdown. In the upcoming weeks, the Coalition got back together as part of a bigger unit under the name "Team Cage" (also including Abyss and A.J. Styles), while Team Angle went on to comprise Angle, Joe, Sting (to counter Abyss), Rhino (to counter Styles), and Jeff Jarrett. At the match itself, Team Angle won when Jarrett hit Abyss with a thumbtack-loaded guitar and let Sting make the pin to become number one contender to Cage's title.

The following Impact!, after Cage and Abyss failed to take the NWA World Tag Team Championship from Team 3D, Abyss was kicked off the team with a beating involving steel chairs and a barbed wire baseball bat. Soon after Tomko and Steiner began chasing the NWA World Tag Team Championship culminating in a 3 Way tag team match at TNA Sacrifice with the Latin American Xchange (LAX) which they lost. Shortly afterwards, Tomko and Steiner had communication problems which caused Rick Steiner to help his brother attack Tomko. Claiming trust issues prior to the event, Scott Steiner turned to family and left Team Cage, following which they began to be referred to once again as "Christian's Coalition". On May 31, 2007 A.J. Styles defeated Tomko in a King of the Mountain qualifying match thanks to a distraction from Christian Cage.

=== The Coalition with A.J. Styles and Tomko ===
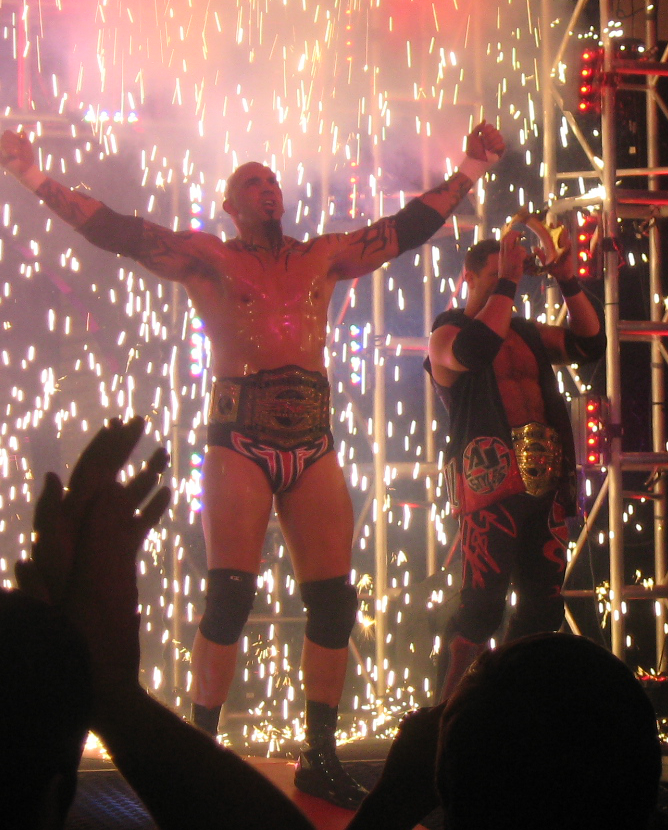
Tomko and A.J. Styles as TNA World Tag Team Champions

On June 14, Cage's qualifying opponent was Abyss, who had laid out Tomko and stopped him from coming out for an earlier match on which Styles would be on the opposite side. With Styles and Tomko's help, Cage won by disqualification after Abyss hit him with a steel chair and managed to escape the monster. At Slammiversary, Tomko lost to Abyss in a no DQ match after taking a Black Hole Slam through broken glass, and both Styles and Christian lost the King of the Mountain match. Christian would then enter into a feud with "the Wildcat" Chris Harris, while the Coalition continued feuding with Sting and Abyss. At Victory Road, Cage defeated Harris, but Styles and Tomko lost to Sting and Abyss.

Robert Roode had a match with Christian's Coalition on the last Impact! before Victory Road, and was seen trying to help them on the first Impact after. On July 26, Mike Tenay cited Roode as a member of Christian's Coalition. Acting as such in helping them lay out Sting and Abyss, Roode seemed to be competing with A.J. Styles for Christian's right hand status. However, he appeared apart from the group in all the immediate weeks after, with no mention of Roode and manager Ms. Brooks being in the Coalition. This suggests they were more of allies than members of the Coalition.

In addition, Sting and Abyss secured a contract for an Abyss vs. Christian match at Hard Justice 2007 with the help of the TNA debut of "The Punisher" Andrew Martin to counteract Tomko's role in the Coalition as an enforcer. At the Impact! prior to Hard Justice, Jim Cornette announced that Christian's Coalition would take on Abyss, Sting and Andrew Martin in a Doomsday Chamber of Blood match at Hard Justice in which the wrestler who scores the pinfall for his team in the match would receive the next title shot at the TNA World Heavyweight Championship. This was a barbed wire six sides of steel cage match that could only be won by pinning an opponent after they've been busted open. At Hard Justice, Christian's Coalition was defeated, as Abyss pinned A.J. Styles for the win. After this, Christian and his Coalition would move into a feud with Samoa Joe over who the "real World Heavyweight Champion" is, having both been screwed out of the title to Angle's benefit in recent weeks. On the September 6 episode of Impact!, the forgotten alliance with Robert Roode was decisively ended, as he and Tomko got into a momentary heated confrontation over his treatment of Ms. Brooks. At No Surrender, Styles and Tomko would win the a 10 Team Gauntlet Match to become the number one contenders for the TNA World Tag Team Championship at Bound for Glory against the team of Adam "Pacman" Jones and Ron "the Truth" Killings. Cage would defeat Joe by disqualification at the same event. Bound For Glory was bittersweet for the Coalition, as A.J. Styles and Tomko defeated Killings and Rasheed Lucius "Consequences" Creed (substituting for Jones, who would instead manage his team that night) for the TNA Tag Team Titles, but Samoa Joe (with Matt Morgan as the special enforcer) would defeat Cage via submission with the Coquina Clutch, ending Christian's TNA-record 23 month streak of not being pinned or forced to submit since arriving in TNA.

=== Split and feud with Angle Alliance ===
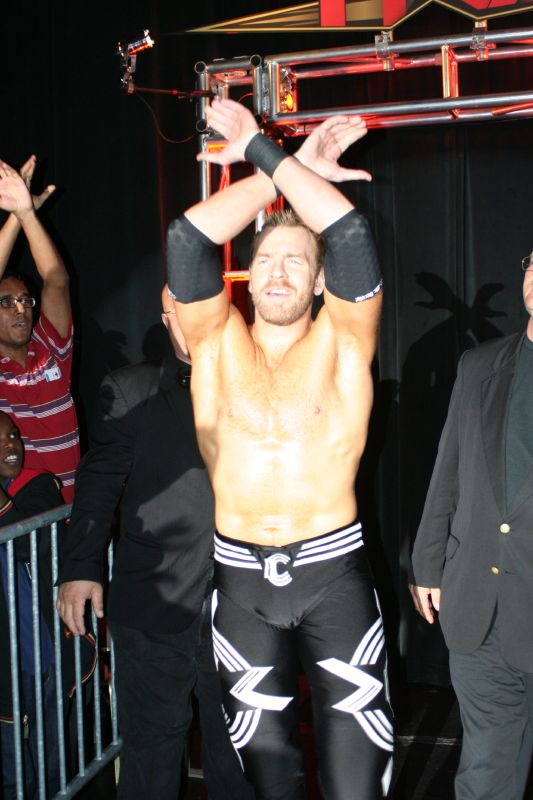
Christian Cage challenged Kurt Angle for the TNA World Heavyweight Championship at Final Resolution and Against All Odds.

After retaining the tag titles against The Steiner Brothers at Genesis, Styles and Tomko came out during Christian's number one contendership ladder match with Kaz right as Cage was about to win, despite his specific instructions not to. This distracted Cage, costing him the match. Immediately after, they would assist Kurt Angle in retaining his TNA World Heavyweight Championship, officially joining Kurt and his wife Karen in the Angle Alliance. From there, Styles and a very skeptical Tomko would attempt, despite the clashing egos and animosity between Christian and the Angles, to be part of both the Angle Alliance and the Christian Coalition. Meanwhile, Cage momentarily found an ally in Robert Roode, goading Roode into a feud with Booker T, before that quickly broke down at the Turning Point PPV.

The next Impact! Roode and Cage joined Angle's group, though Christian's membership came on the condition that he became leader of all five of them. Surprisingly, Angle accepted with only momentary hesitation. The newly united stable first worked together for the main event later that evening, but after miscommunication cost them the match, Christian argued with and was attacked by Roode and Angle as Styles tried to hold them back and Tomko just walked away. Christian was clearly out of the Angle Alliance, but status was unknown for Styles and Tomko as far as either the Alliance or the Coalition. On Impact the week after Cage was again attacked by Angle and Roode but this time an upset looking Styles just watched from the ring apron.

In the weeks since, Tomko made it clear to Styles that they needed to choose sides, and while Styles had been indecisive to no end, Tomko firmly established his own foothold in the situation by leaving both the Coalition and the Alliance on the January 3, 2008 edition of Impact. At Final Resolution, after being seduced in a bathroom stall by Kurt's wife Karen Angle, Styles helped Kurt Angle defeat Cage, making his decision to leave the Coalition. Tomko put the final nail in the Coalition's coffin when he helped Angle defeat Cage at Against All Odds 2008 and announced on the following edition of Impact! that he was officially joining the Angle Alliance. Christian would attempt to enact revenge by banding together with new number one contender Samoa Joe and Joe's new adviser Kevin Nash in a group he called the "Unlikely Alliance".

=== Team Cage (2008) ===
Following the Unlikely Alliance's win over the Angle Alliance in a six-man tag team match at Destination X 2008, Christian Cage and Tomko would be assigned to captain opposing teams for the next Lethal Lockdown match at the next pay-per-view, Lockdown. In response to Tomko acquiring Team 3D to join him and A.J., Christian and Kevin Nash's new Team Cage was assembled by reconciling Cage's issues with Rhino (stemming from Christian's pre-Coalition villainous turn in 2006), bringing back the icon Sting from his latest hiatus, and enlisting Matt Morgan to trick Team Tomko by allowing James Storm to join their ranks a week after attacking Sting, only so Morgan could turn around and join Team Cage himself at the end of that same Impact!. At Lockdown Team Cage won after Rhino hit Storm with the Gore. The group instantly dissolved into separate units soon thereafter, seemingly ending the story of the Christian Coalition/Team Cage once and for all with longtime friends Christian Cage and Rhino, whose initial falling out in 2006 led to Christian turning against the fans and forming the Coalition, now forming a regular tag team.

Later on, due to having common enemies in Kurt Angle, Team 3D, Booker T and Tomko, Christian and Rhino would also reconcile with A.J. Styles, as the three of them became loose allies. Tomko, meanwhile, later left TNA for Japan, but ended up coming back for one last appearance against Samoa Joe when many of his Inoki Genome Federation (IGF) bookings were canceled. Christian left afterward to sign back with WWE.

== Members ==
=== Christian's Coalition (former) ===
- Christian Cage (leader)
- A.J. Styles
- Tomko
- Robert Roode

=== Team Cage (former) ===
- Christian Cage (leader)
- Abyss
- Kevin Nash
- Rhino
- Scott Steiner
- Sting
- Matt Morgan

== Championships and accomplishments ==
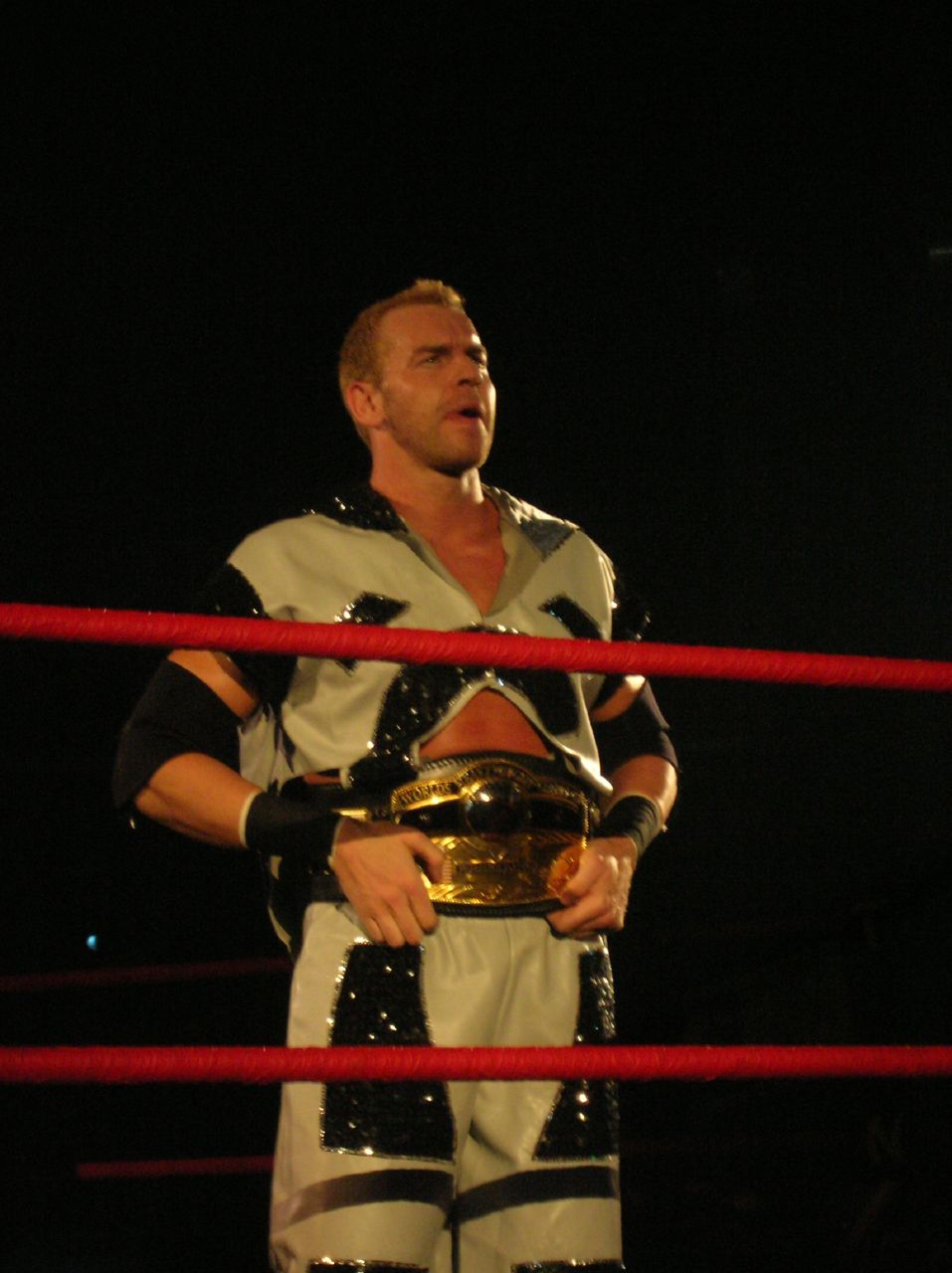
Cage as the NWA World Heavyweight Champion.

- New Japan Pro-Wrestling
  - IWGP Tag Team Championship (1 time) – Tomko with Giant Bernard
- Total Nonstop Action Wrestling
  - NWA World Heavyweight Championship (1 time) – Christian Cage
  - TNA World Tag Team Championship (1 time) – A.J. Styles and Tomko
  - Gauntlet for the Gold (2007 – Tag Team) – A.J. Styles and Tomko
  - Gauntlet for the Gold (2008 – Heavyweight) – Christian Cage

== See also ==
- A.J. Styles and Tomko
- Angle Alliance
