= Mark Johnson (referee) =

American professional wrestling referee

Mark Eric Johnson
Personal information
- Born: Atlanta, Georgia

Professional wrestling career
- Ring name(s): Mark Johnson; Mark "Slick" Johnson

Mark Eric "Slick" Johnson is an American professional wrestling referee, best known for working for World Championship Wrestling (WCW) and Total Nonstop Action Wrestling (TNA).

== Career ==
=== World Championship Wrestling ===
Johnson gained national exposure in the late 1990s when he joined the Atlanta, Georgia-based World Championship Wrestling (WCW) promotion as a referee. After suffering elbow injuries in 1998 caused during a match by Konnan, he was sidelined until late 1999. When he returned, Johnson was given the gimmick of an unethical referee who actively favoured heel wrestlers (as opposed to the other referees, who officiated matches in an objective fashion). While in WCW, he was a member of the New World Order faction, wrestled several matches, refereed a total of eighty five main events and had the dubious distinction of being pantsed by Stacy Keibler during a match on pay-per-view. He remained with WCW until the promotion was purchased by the World Wrestling Federation in March 2001.

From 2001 to 2002, Johnson was the primary referee for the World Wrestling All-Stars promotion.

=== Total Nonstop Action Wrestling ===
Johnson worked for the Nashville, Tennessee based Total Nonstop Action Wrestling (TNA) promotion from its inception in 2002, portraying a corrupt referee who accepted bribes, continuing the character he first adopted in WCW. He left TNA after several months to focus on his rock band, The Slick Johnsons, which was entering a Battle of the Bands in an attempt to gain a recording contract. He returned to the promotion in March 2005, replacing Mike Posey as a regular referee.

At Against All Odds on February 12, 2006, Johnson confronted Director of Authority Larry Zbyszko, demanding to know who was to referee the main event title match between Christian Cage and NWA World Heavyweight Champion Jeff Jarrett, suggesting that his experience in WCW made him an appropriate choice of referee. His inquiry was rebuffed by Zbyszko, who later revealed the referee to be the debuting Earl Hebner. Over the following weeks, Johnson repeatedly requested to referee main event matches, with Zbyszko rejecting his appeals each time. Zbyszko eventually was about to give in to Johnson's incessant requests when Johnson suddenly withdrew his request to become a senior referee. Johnson explained that TNA management would be sending in a new representative in the near future, and that everyone would have a clean slate at that point. This sparked the storyline of the new face of TNA management, in which backstage dialogue between Zbyszko and Johnson served to build up the debut of the newest authority figure in TNA Wrestling, later revealed at Slammiversary to be none other than Jim Cornette. During this time Johnson would frequently wear outrageous referee uniforms, such as elaborate bowties and striped shorts akin to those worn by a soccer referee.

On June 13, 2007, he left TNA to pursue other interests. At Bound for Glory on October 14, 2007, Johnson returned to TNA Wrestling as a full-time referee. At Final Resolution in 2008, he refereed a match between Gail Kim and Awesome Kong. Johnson was powerbombed and hit with a chair by Awesome Kong. At Victory Road, he turned heel again when he helped Angelina Love of The Beautiful People regain the TNA Women's Knockout Championship even though Tara clearly had her foot on the ropes. Later on in the pay-per-view, Slick was seen leaving the Knockouts shower room and as he left, Madison Rayne of The Beautiful People came out from the same cubicle as him adjusting her top, implying that the two had sex. However, it didn't last; he resumed being fair to both faces and heels shortly thereafter. Johnson left TNA in late 2010.

== Personal life ==
Johnson is real life friends with Buff Bagwell. He appeared on the Dark Side of the Ring episode covering Buff Bagwell.
