= David Penzer =

American professional wrestling announcer

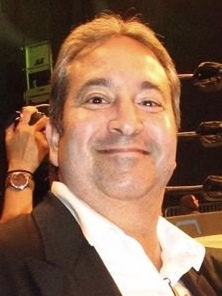
- Penzer in 2017
- Born: May 22, 1966 (age 60); The Bronx, New York, New York, U.S.
- Education: University of Florida
- Occupations: Realtor, podcaster, ring announcer
- Organization(s): Global Wrestling Alliance (1988–1993); World Championship Wrestling (1993–2001); Total Nonstop Action Wrestling (2006–2010, 2017, 2020–2023)

David Penzer (born May 22, 1966) is an American professional wrestling ring announcer. He is best known for his work with World Championship Wrestling (WCW) from 1993 to 2001, and Total Nonstop Action Wrestling (formerly known as Impact Wrestling) from 2006 to 2010 and then from 2020 to 2023. Outside of ring announcing, he is also a realtor and hosted the podcast Sitting Ringside.

== Early life ==
Penzer attended the University of Florida. While there, he operated a mobile disc jockey company.

== Announcing career ==
=== Global Wrestling Alliance (1988–1993) ===
Penzer debuted as a ring announcer in 1988, appearing with the Global Wrestling Alliance in the South Florida metropolitan area.

=== World Championship Wrestling (1993–2001) ===
Penzer first became involved with World Championship Wrestling around mid-to-late 1993 or early 1994 while acting as a booking agent for Floridan jobbers who appeared at WCW events. He was eventually hired by Tony Schiavone in 1995 and was mentored by Gary Cappetta. When Cappetta was released from WCW in 1995, Penzer was appointed main ring announcer by WCW President Eric Bischoff. His announcing attire was notable in that, rather than the traditional black, Penzer often wore a vibrantly colorful cummerbund with his tuxedo.

Penzer's place at wrestling events was usually restricted to announcing; however, in late 1997, Chris Jericho found himself on a losing streak and would repeatedly attack Penzer for announcing the winner's name, often taking Penzer's steel chair and repeatedly bash it against the ring post. Jericho would then give humorous apologies and even gave Penzer a new suit jacket as a gift, yet he would once again throw a tantrum soon after. Penzer remained with WCW until the promotion was purchased by the World Wrestling Federation in March 2001. In the course of his WCW career, he attended every single taping of WCW Monday Nitro as well as Thunder.

=== Post-WCW (2001–2005) ===
Following the sale of WCW, Penzer worked with the Xcitement Wrestling Federation until it closed. He then began working on the independent circuit as a booking agent, in addition to acting as the manager of Rowdy Roddy Piper's book tour and appearing with the short-lived World Wrestling All-Stars promotion. In 2001, he was the ring announcer for the main event of a NWA Florida show where Steve Corino defeated Mike Rapada to become the new NWA World Heavyweight Champion. In 2004, he became Vice President of an airbrush tattoo company.

=== Total Nonstop Action Wrestling (2006–2010) ===
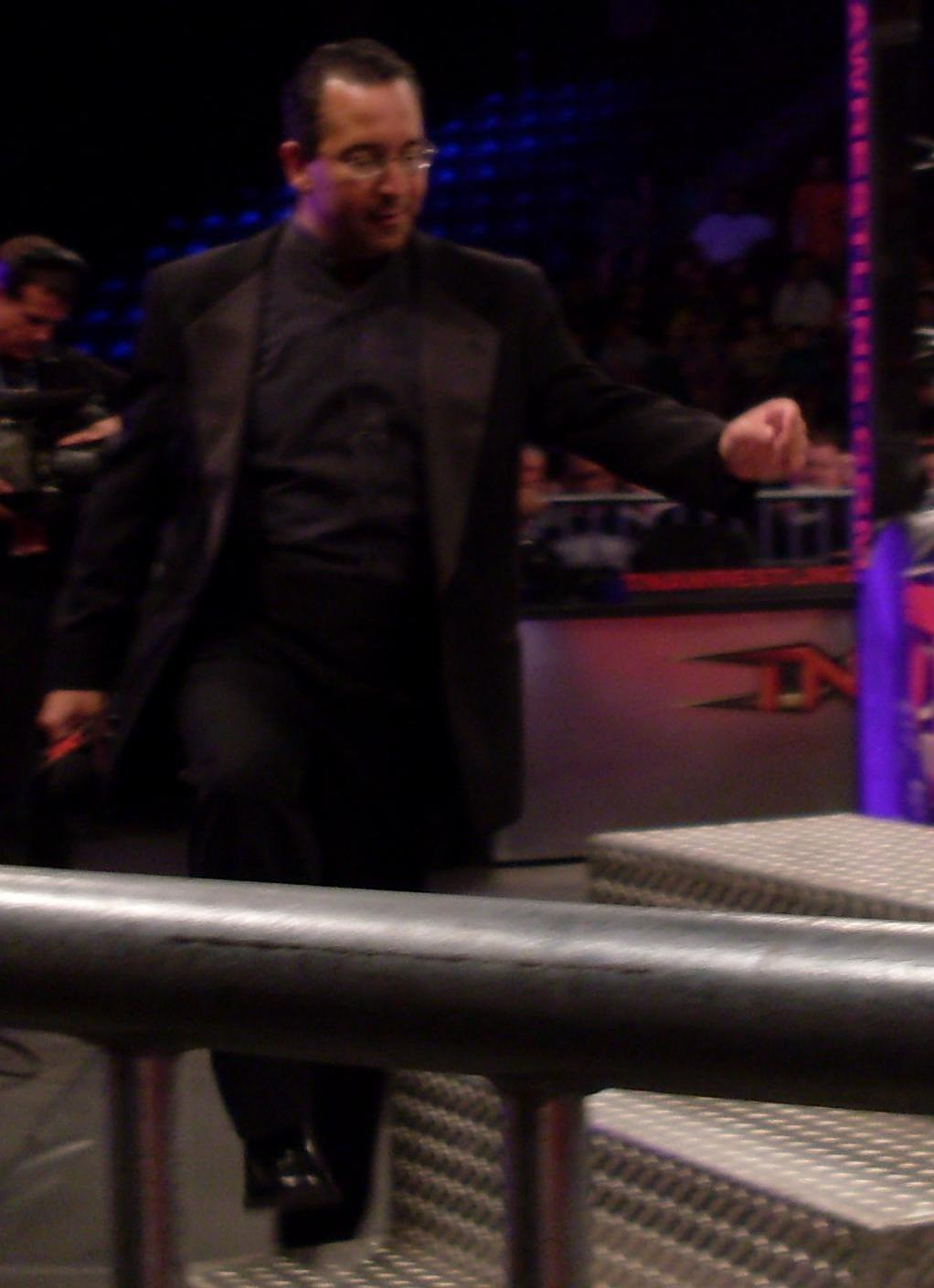
Penzer at No Surrender 2008.

In 2006, Penzer joined Total Nonstop Action Wrestling as a ring announcer, making his debut on the pre-show of Against All Odds pay-per-view on February 12, 2006, replacing Jeremy Borash, who became a backstage interviewer in the process.

On the October 16, 2008 edition of TNA Impact!, Kurt Angle beat up Penzer and then put the Ankle lock on him. Penzer was legitimately injured as his face became swollen. Jeremy Borash took over ring announcing duties for the rest of the night.

On May 16, 2010, Penzer was released from TNA as a cost cutting measure, with Borash returning to his previous position. Penzer's final show during this tenure was the May 13, 2010 edition of Impact!.

=== Returns to Impact Wrestling (2017, 2020–2023) ===
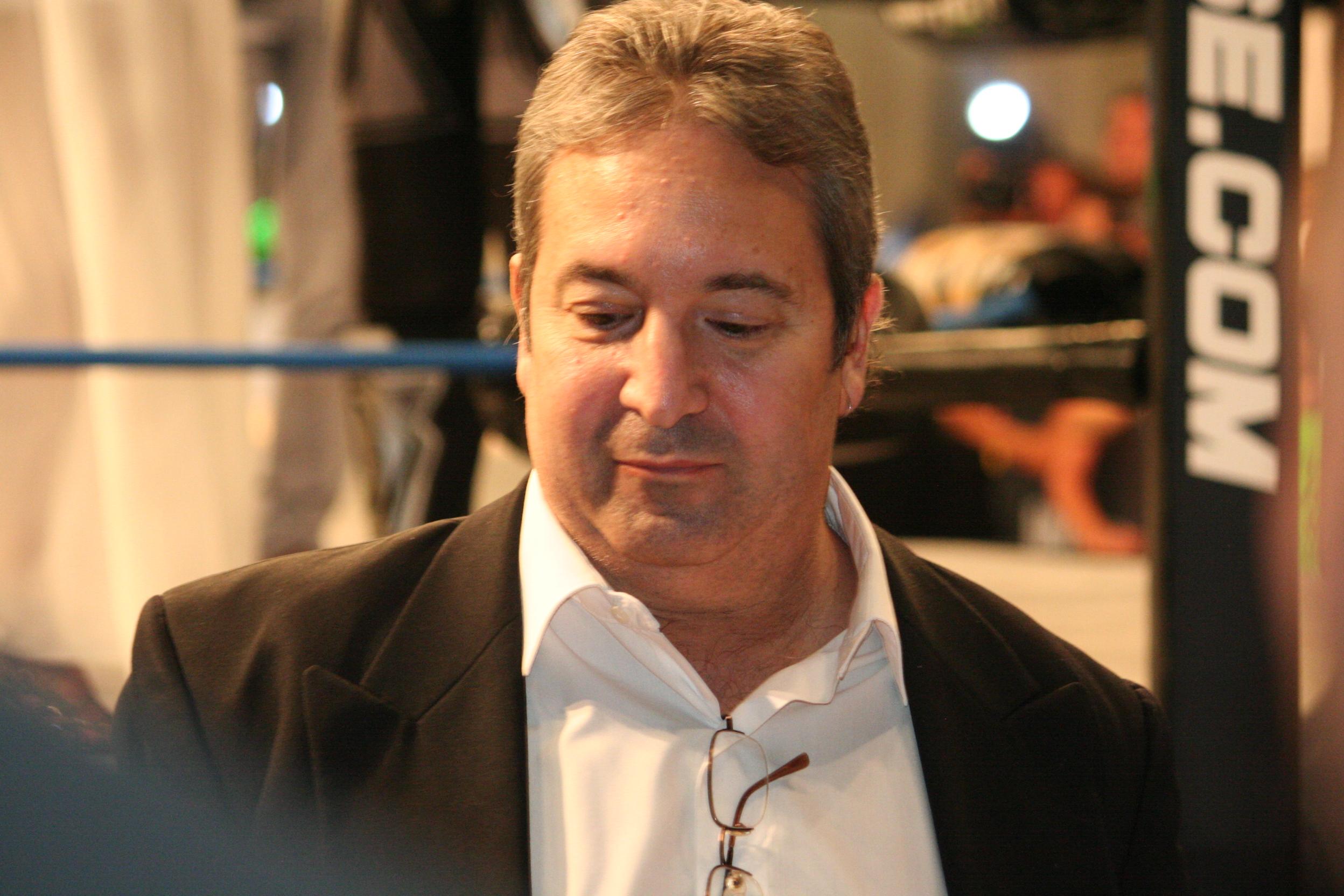
Penzer at Slammiversary XV.

Penzer returned to Impact Wrestling as a ring announcer at the April 21 Impact Wrestling television tapings, replacing Rockstar Spud. He was the ring announcer for much of 2017 up until Bound for Glory in November. In December 2017, Penzer announced on his Sitting Ringside podcast that he would not return to Impact Wrestling in the near future due to their ongoing budget cuts.

Penzer was supposed to be the ring announcer for the TNA: There's No Place Like Home pay-per-view before it was called off due to the ongoing COVID-19 pandemic. However, Penzer later got signed full-time, making his second return to the company, starting in March 2020 at the Impact! tapings in Coca-Cola Roxy in Atlanta, Georgia, where he also did commentary work with Scott D'Amore for the TNA on AXS TV special, which was a preview broadcast for the aforementioned pay-per-piew. In addition to becoming the ring announcer once again for Impact Wrestling, Penzer also became the host of the weekly interview segment Around the Ring on Impact! Xplosion beginning with the May 23 edition.

Penzer's ring announcing for Impact is mostly done with him outside the ring except for some championship matches where he introduces in-ring the participants after their entrances. During several months in 2021, Moose used this method to his advantage after he declared himself TNA World Champion at Rebellion and would instruct Penzer to introduce several of his matches in-ring as championship matches to validate his reign.

On December 10, 2023, Penzer confirmed his departure from Impact Wrestling during Final Resolution, before the company rebranded back to TNA. He was replaced by Jennifer Chung.

== Post-wrestling career ==
In 2014, Penzer became a real estate agent in the Tampa, Florida area with Exit Elite Realty.

In 2017, Penzer began to appear regularly on the YouTube channel THE HANNIBAL TV, recalling his experiences in wrestling or interviewing other stars on their experiences. It was the first time in seven years he was seen in the wrestling business.

In April 2024 Penzer published the first of a two volume memoir titled Sitting Ringside.
