= TNA Against All Odds (2008) =

2008 Total Nonstop Action Wrestling pay-per-view event

Against All Odds (2008)
- Promotional poster featuring Abyss
- Promotion: Total Nonstop Action Wrestling
- Date: February 10, 2008
- City: Greenville, South Carolina
- Venue: BI-LO Center
- Attendance: 3,500
- Tagline: BARB-WIRED!!!

Pay-per-view chronology
← Previous; Final Resolution	Next → Destination X

Against All Odds chronology
← Previous; 2007	Next → 2009

The 2008 Against All Odds was a professional wrestling pay-per-view (PPV) event produced by the Total Nonstop Action Wrestling (TNA) promotion, which took place on February 10, 2008, at the BI-LO Center in Greenville, South Carolina. It was the fourth event under the Against All Odds chronology and the second event in the 2008 TNA PPV schedule. Nine professional wrestling matches were featured on the event's card, four of which involved championships, while two matches were held prior to the event.

The main event was for the TNA World Heavyweight Championship with Samoa Joe as Special Outside Enforcer between then-champion Kurt Angle and the challenger Christian Cage. Angle ended up winning the bout, thus retaining the championship. Jay Lethal and The Motor City Machine Guns (Alex Shelley and Chris Sabin) fought Johnny Devine and Team 3D (Brother Devon and Brother Ray) in a Six Man Tag Team Street Fight on the card. Lethal and The Motor City Machine Guns won the encounter. A Barbed Wire Massacre between Abyss and Judas Mesias was held at Against All Odds, which Abyss won. Booker T fought Robert Roode to a double countout in another highly promoted match for the event.

This is the first event to have matches featured from different arenas air on the same show. This event also marked the second time the Barbed Wire Massacre match type was used by TNA. Chris Sokol of the professional wrestling section of the Canadian Online Explorer rated the event a seven and a half out of ten, higher than the six out of ten given to the 2007 event's ranking by Chris Sokol.

== Production ==
=== Background ===
The next installment in the Against All Odds chronology was announced in late-November 2007 to take place on February 10, 2008, at the BI-LO Center in Greenville, South Carolina. Tickets for the event went on sale December 7, 2007. In January 2008, In Demand listed a preview regarding Against All Odds, which advertised the event would hold the second-ever Barbed Wire Massacre. The South Carolina Athletic Commission originally gave TNA permission to hold Barbed Wire Massacre, however they receded their blessing prior to the event. Due to this, TNA were forced to change the location of the bout from the BI-LO Center to the TNA Impact Zone in Orlando, Florida. TNA taped the match between Abyss and Judas Mesias on January 22, 2008, at the tapings of the January 31 and February 7, 2008, episodes of TNA's television program TNA Impact!. Consequences Creed taking part in a match prior to the show was promoted by TNA on their website. Due to poor ticket sales, it was reported TNA gave away several tickets for free. TNA released a poster featuring Abyss sometime prior to help promote the event.

=== Storylines ===
Against All Odds featured nine professional wrestling matches and two matches prior to the event that involved different wrestlers from pre-existing scripted feuds and storylines. Wrestlers portrayed villains, heroes, or less distinguishable characters in the scripted events that built tension and culminated into a wrestling match or series of matches.

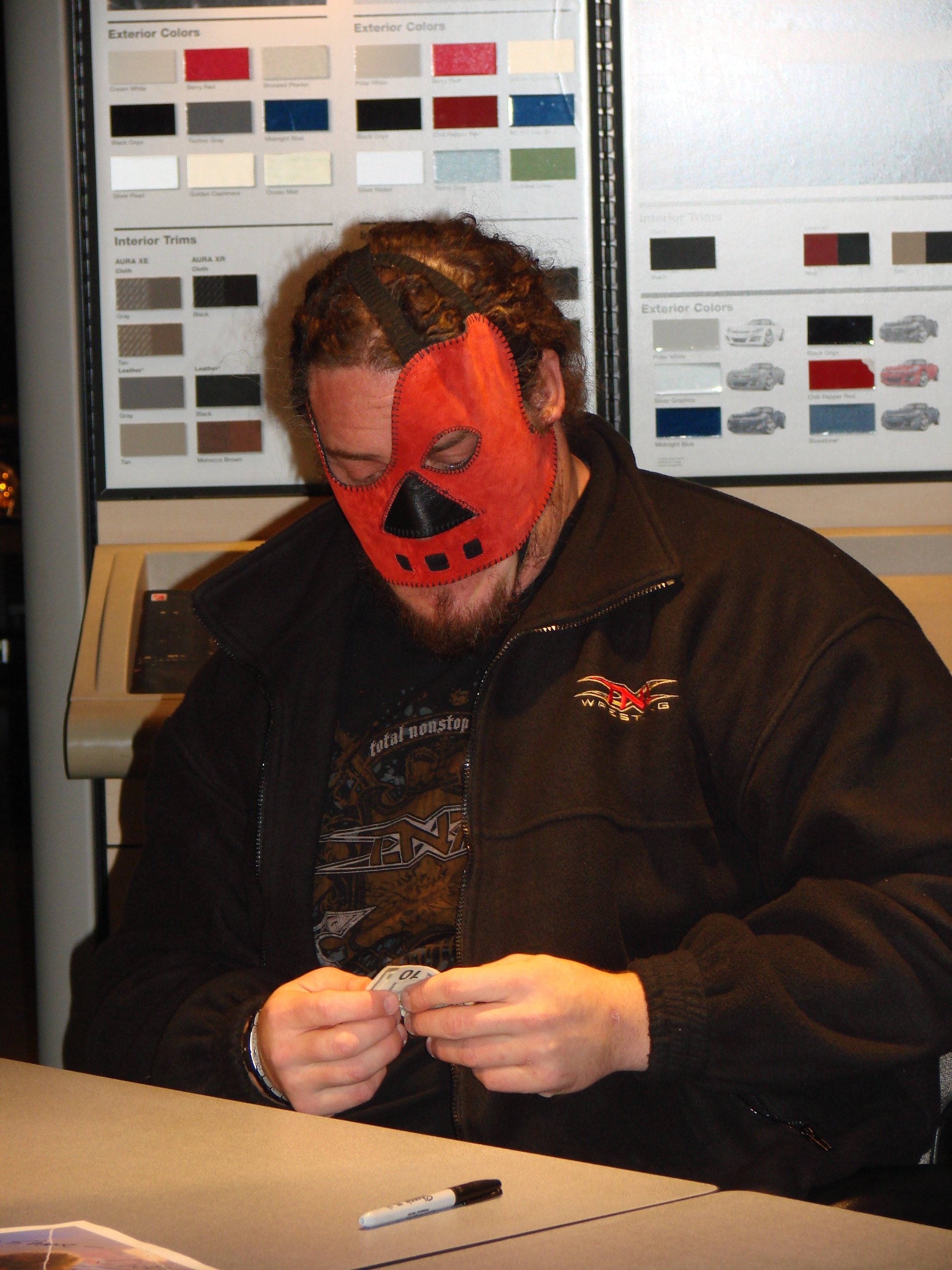
Abyss versus Judas Mesias in the second-ever Barbed Wire Massacre was promoted for Against All Odds.

The main event at Against All Odds was for the TNA World Heavyweight Championship with Samoa Joe as Special Outside Enforcer between then-champion Kurt Angle and the challenger Christian Cage. On January 6, 2008, at TNA's previous PPV event Final Resolution, Angle defeated Cage to retain the championship after Cage's alliance A.J. Styles attacked Cage, aligning with Angle and The Angle Alliance. On the January 10, 2008 episode of Impact!, Management Director Jim Cornette announced that Cage, Joe, and Styles would compete in a Three Way match on the January 17, 2008 episode of Impact!. Stipulations for the match were that the winner would get a TNA World Heavyweight Championship match against Angle at Against All Odds, however if Styles won he could choose instead of the title match to allow Angle to not have to defend his title for two months. Cage ended up winning the contest, thus becoming the number one contender. On the January 24, 2008 episode of Impact!, Cornette announced that Joe would be the Special Outside Enforcer at Against All Odds due him being controversially disqualified during the match. Also connected to the storyline was the allegiance of former Christian's Coalition and The Angle Alliance member Tomko to either Cage or Angle. Heading up to the match, Tomko explained he was not on either's side, despite being one-half of the TNA World Tag Team Champions with Styles. On the January 31, 2008 episode of Impact!, Tomko defeated Angle after interference from Cage. This resulted in Tomko and Cage seeming to be on the same page on the February 7, 2008 episode of Impact!.

The main storyline in TNA's X Division revolved around Team 3D's (Brother Devon and Brother Ray) attempt to eliminate the X Division. This feud began on the October 18, 2007 episode of Impact! when Team 3D attacked The Motor City Machine Guns (Alex Shelley and Chris Sabin; MCMG) and proclaimed they were going to eliminate the X Division. MCMG went on to defeat Team 3D at TNA's Genesis PPV event on November 11, 2007. At the same event, Team 3D attacked and stole the TNA X Division Championship from then-champion Jay Lethal. On the November 15, 2007 episode of Impact!, Johnny Devine turned on the X Division and joined Team 3D in their quest. Team 3D and Devine went on to defeat Lethal and MCMG in a Six Man Tag Team Tables Match at TNA's Turning Point PPV event on December 2, 2007. The two teams then faced again at Final Resolution in a Six Man Tag Team Ultimate X match, which Team 3D and Devine won. On the January 10, 2008 episode of Impact!, Devine and Team 3D challenged Lethal and MCMG to a Street Fight at Against All Odds, with the stipulation that if Team 3D won the X Division would disband, but if Lethal and MCMG won they would regain possession of the TNA X Division Championship and the X Division would continue to exist. On the January 17, 2008 episode of Impact!, Lethal and MCMG accepted the agreement but only after including that Team 3D would have to weigh less than 275 pounds in order to compete in their matches in TNA. On the January 24, 2008 episode of Impact!, Devine defeated Lethal to become the new TNA X Division Champion.

The second-ever Barbed Wire Massacre was promoted for Against All Odds between Abyss and Judas Mesias. The feud for this match began in mid-2007 when Abyss' former manager Father James Mitchell returned and began a storyline with Abyss. Mesias made his debut on the September 13, 2007 episode of Impact! attacking Abyss at the request of Mitchell. After months of inactivity, Mesias returned on the December 13, 2007 episode of Impact! attacking Abyss. At Final Resolution, Mesias defeated Abyss with help from Mitchell. On the January 24 episode of Impact!, Mitchell finally announced his reasons for feuding with Abyss, that he was Abyss' father and Mesias was Abyss' half-brother in the narrative. TNA promoted a Barbed Wire Massacre match between Abyss and Mesias at Against All Odds sometime after this.

At Final Resolution, the team of Robert Roode and Ms. Brooks fought the team of Booker T and Sharmell. The storyline behind this encounter involved Sharmell coming to the defense of Roode's manager Ms. Brooks, who Roode verbally abused on the December 13, 2007 episode of Impact!. After the encounter, Roode accidentally punched Sharmell in the face, resulting in a storyline fractured jaw which sidelined her from appearing for the promotion and upsetting her real-life husband Booker T. Following the event, Roode fired Brooks and higher her replacement Payton Banks on the January 10 episode of Impact!, setting up a match between the two at Against All Odds. TNA promoted a match between Booker T and Robert Roode heading into Against All Odds.

Two matches taking place at Against All Odds revolved around the Feast or Fired cases won at Turning Point by B.G. James, Petey Williams, and Scott Steiner. On the December 13, 2007 episode of Impact!, James was revealed to hold a future TNA World Tag Team Championship match with a partner of his choice, Williams' case was shown to hold a future TNA World Heavyweight Championship match, and Steiner's case held a future TNA X Division Championship match. During the segment, Steiner switched his case with Williams prior to the contents being revealed. This created a storyline between the two leading up to the January 31, 2008 episode of Impact! when Steiner teamed with Williams to face The Rock 'n Rave Infection (Jimmy Rave and Lance Hoyt). During the contest, Steiner stole Williams' case, bashed Williams with it, and left the arena. On the February 7, 2008 episode of Impact!, Cornette announced that Steiner and Williams would face at Against All Odds in which the winner would gain both cases. In the weeks following the December 13 episode, B.G.'s Voodoo Kin Mafia tag team partner Kip James inquired on when B.G. would announce his tag team partner. Finally, on the January 17, 2008 episode of Impact!, B.G. announced his choice was his real-life father Bob Armstrong. On the January 24, 2008 episode of Impact!, B.G. and Armstrong announced they would use their title shot at Against All Odds. TNA later promoted A.J. Styles and Tomko versus B.G. James and Bob Armstrong for the TNA World Tag Team Championship for the event.

== Event ==
Two matches were held prior to the event. The first was a tag team match pitting Jackie Moore and newly named Traci Brooks against WTPT disc jockeys The Rise Guys (Skip and Mattman), which Moore and Brooks won when Moore gained the pinfall. The second was also a tag team match, in which the team of Sonjay Dutt and Consequences Creed defeated The Rock 'n Rave Infection (Jimmy Rave and Lance Hoyt) after Creed gained the fall on Rave.

=== Miscellaneous ===
The event featured employees other than the wrestlers involved in the matches. Mike Tenay and Don West were the commentators for the telecast. Jeremy Borash and David Penzer were ring announcers for the event. Andrew Thomas, Earl Hebner, Rudy Charles, and Mark "Slick" Johnson participated as referees for the encounters. Crystal Louthan, Scott Hudson, and Borash were used as interviewers during the event. Besides employees appearing in a wrestling role, Jackie Moore, Raisha Saeed, Jim Cornette, Father James Mitchell, Sonjay Dutt, SoCal Val, and Karen Angle all appeared on camera, either in backstage or ringside segments.

=== Preliminary matches ===
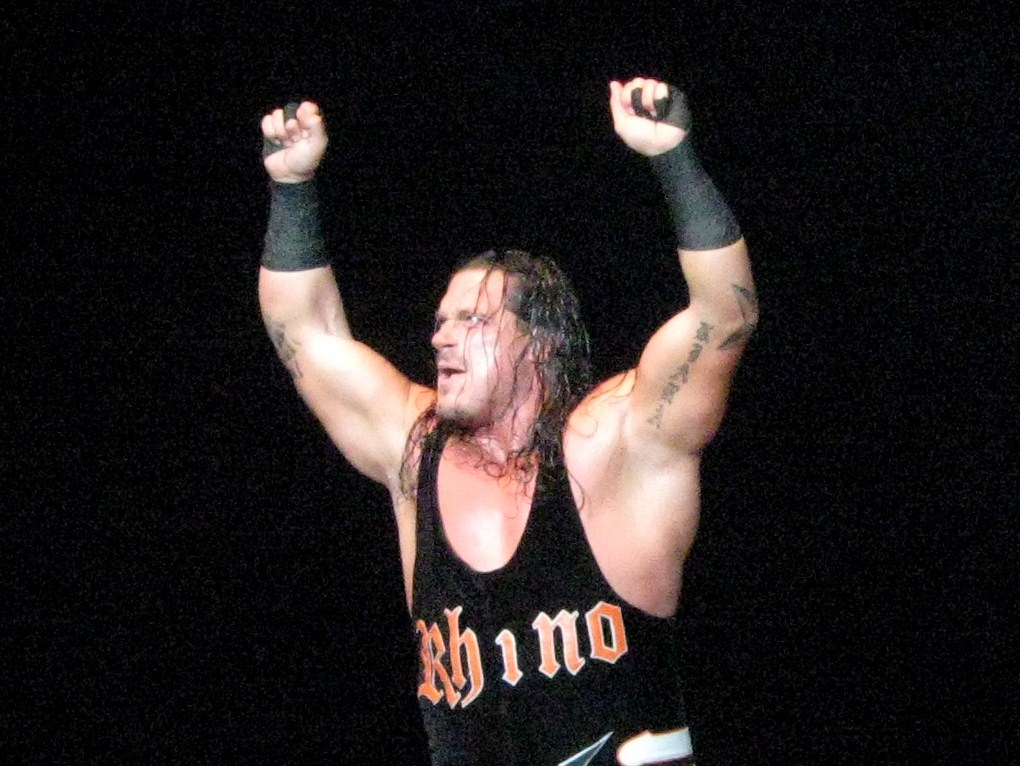
Rhino returned from injury at Against All Odds attacking James Storm.

A.J. Styles and Tomko defended the TNA World Tag Team Championship against the team of B.G. James and Bob Armstrong in the opening match. It lasted seven minutes and forty-five seconds. B.G. and Armstrong were accompanied to the ring by United States Military officers. B.G. was injured in storyline after Styles hit him in the leg with a dropkick during the contest. Tomko and Styles won the match after they performed their signature tag team Tornado–Plex maneuver forcing B.G. into the mat to retain the TNA World Tag Team Championship.

Traci Brooks fought Payton Banks in the second bout, lasting five minutes and seven seconds. Brooks won the bout after gaining a pinfall with a schoolgirl pin. After the match, Banks attacked Brooks.

The TNA World Heavyweight and TNA X Division Feast or Fired Title shots were fought over in the match between Scott Steiner and Petey Williams. Its duration was nine minutes and twenty-four seconds. Williams gained a near-fall during the bout by using a schoolboy pin. Near the end an unknown woman entered the arena and stood on the ring apron to distract Williams. This allowed Steiner to perform a powerbomb on Williams, thus winning the encounter and both cases.

Eric Young defended the TNA World Beer Drinking Championship against James Storm, who was accompanied by Jackie Moore, in the fourth encounter. Moore interfered in the bout helping Storm twice. The first ended when Young performed a suplex on Moore and Storm at the same time. The second involved Moore distracting the referee, at which time Rhino made his return from an injury and entered the ring to perform his signature Gore maneuver on Storm, giving Young the victory at seven minutes and forty-nine seconds to retain the TNA World Beer Drinking Championship.

The TNA Women's Knockout Championship was defended by Awesome Kong, who was accompanied by Raisha Saeed, against ODB in a match lasting six minutes and fifty-four seconds. During the match, Kong was positioned on the top of a padded turnbuckle which allowed ODB to lift her off and perform a powerbomb gaining a near-fall. Afterwards, Saeed stood on the ring apron to distract ODB, allowing Kong to perform her signature Awesome Bomb maneuver and gain the pinfall to retain the TNA Women's Knockout Championship.

=== Main event matches ===
Jay Lethal pinned Johnny Devine at Against All Odds to win the TNA X Division Championship.

The second-ever Barbed Wire Massacre was the sixth match on the card between Abyss and Judas Mesias, who was accompanied by Father James Mitchell. Its duration was fourteen minutes and fifty-one seconds. It was featured from the TNA Impact! Zone in Orlando, Florida, because the city of Greenville, SC refused to allow a match that violent to take place live. In Barbed Wire Massacre, the ring ropes are switched with strands of barbed-wire and several weapons are featured wrapped in barbed-wire. The match falls under no disqualifications rules and is won by either a pinfall or submission. Mesias bashed Abyss over the head with a barbed-wire wrapped chair, which caused Abyss to bleed from the forehead. Abyss performed his signature Black Hole Slam maneuver on Mitchell after he interfered in the bout. Abyss won the contest after using the Black Hole Slam to drop Mesias onto a barbed-wire wrapped board.

The next match pitted Booker T against Robert Roode, who was accompanied by Payton Banks, in a bout lasting nine minutes and seventeen seconds. Near the end, Booker T began to bash Roode's leg against the ringpost. Afterwards, Roode began walking to the backstage area as Booker T followed continuing the fight as the referee counted out both men, ending the contest in a draw. Booker T and Roode fought throughout the backstage area into the parking lot, where Roode pulled Banks from the driver's seat of a car before making his own get away leaving Booker T and Banks behind.

The Six Man Tag Team Street Fight between the team of Jay Lethal and MCMG (Alex Shelley and Chris Sabin) and the team of Johnny Devine and Team 3D (Brother Devon and Brother Ray). The stipulations were if Lethal and MCMG won then Team 3D would be forced to work with a weight limit, while if Devine and Team 3D won the TNA X Division would dissemble. Another added stipulation before the contest was whoever gained the pinfall would win the TNA X Division Championship. It lasted twelve minutes and thirty seconds. A Street Fight is fought under no disqualification and no count-out rules, with weapons legal and provided for the match. During the final minutes, both Sabin and Shelley were scripted to appear unconscious at ringside, which caused Lethal to have to fight off Devine and Team 3D alone. Near the end of the match Team 3D set up a table; Lethal followed by sending both out of the ring and laying Devine over the table. Lethal then stood on the top of a padded turnbuckle and jumped off to perform an elbow drop on Devine through the table to win the match. With the victory, Lethal won the TNA X Division Championship, prevented the X Division from disbanding, and forced Team 3D to work with a weight limit in the company.

The main event was for the TNA World Heavyweight Championship with Samoa Joe as Special Outside Enforcer between the champion Kurt Angle, who was accompanied by Karen Angle, and the challenger Christian Cage. The duration of the encounter was twenty minutes and forty seconds. Angle attempted to use a steel chair during the contest, but was stopped and it was taken away by Joe. Cage performed his signature Unprettier maneuver, resulting in a near-fall. In the final minutes, A.J. Styles interfered in the bout to attack Cage, but was stopped by Joe. Angle then grabbed a steel chair from ringside and bashed Cage with it. Tomko came down to the ring where he threw the chair out of the ring and proceeded to grab Angle. He then released Angle and lifted Cage up to perform an Argentine Neckbreaker to slam Cage into the mat back first. Angle followed by pinning Cage to retain the TNA World Heavyweight Championship.

== Reception ==
3,500 people attended the event. Canadian Online Explorer writer Chris Sokol rated the entire event a seven and a half out of ten, which was higher than the six out of ten given to the 2007 Against All Odds event by Chris Sokol. Against All Odds rating was higher than TNA's previous event Final Resolution, which was given a six out of ten. It was also higher than the six given to TNA's next event Destination X. Compared to rival World Wrestling Entertainment's No Way Out PPV event held on February 17, 2008, Against All Odds was rated higher as No Way Out was given a six out of ten by Dave Hillhouse. Sokol gave the main event his highest rating of the review a nine out of ten. The Six Man Tag Team Street Fight was given an eight out of ten. The Barbed Wire Massacre and Booker T versus Robert Roode bouts were both ranked with a six out of ten. The lowest rating of Sokol's review was given to the TNA World Tag Team Championship match with a four out of ten. Sokol felt the main event was an "instant classic", while the Street Fight was a "great match." Regarding the Barbed Wire Massacre, Sokol believed it was a "decent match overall." The Booker T and Roode contest he thought was "more of a brawl" than a match. Wade Keller of the Pro Wrestling Torch rated the main event three and a half stars out of five, his highest rating of the review, and believed there was just "too much interference at the end." Keller gave the Street Fight three stars out of five, while the Barbed Wire Massacre was given two and a quarter stars out of five. Booker T versus Roode was given one and three-quarter stars out of five, while Payton Banks versus Traci Brooks was ranked with half of a star out of give, Keller's lowest rating. Keller thought the Street Fight was a "good chaotic brawl," while the Roode versus Booker T bout had "good intensity" but was "short for a grudge match with an unsatisfying finish." Keller felt the Barbed Wire Massacre "largely delivered" on what people "expected based on the build up." James Caldwell of the Pro Wrestling Torch also reviewed the event, giving the main event his highest rating of four and one-quarter stars out of five and the Roode versus Booker and Barbed Wire Massacre his lowest rating with one star each. Caldwell gave the Street Fight three stars out of five. Commenting on the main event, Caldwell said it was a "really strong main event" and "easily top match on the show." Caldwell felt the Street Fight qualified for "best match of the show" up to that point. The event was released on DVD on April 22, 2008, by TNA Home Video.

== Aftermath ==
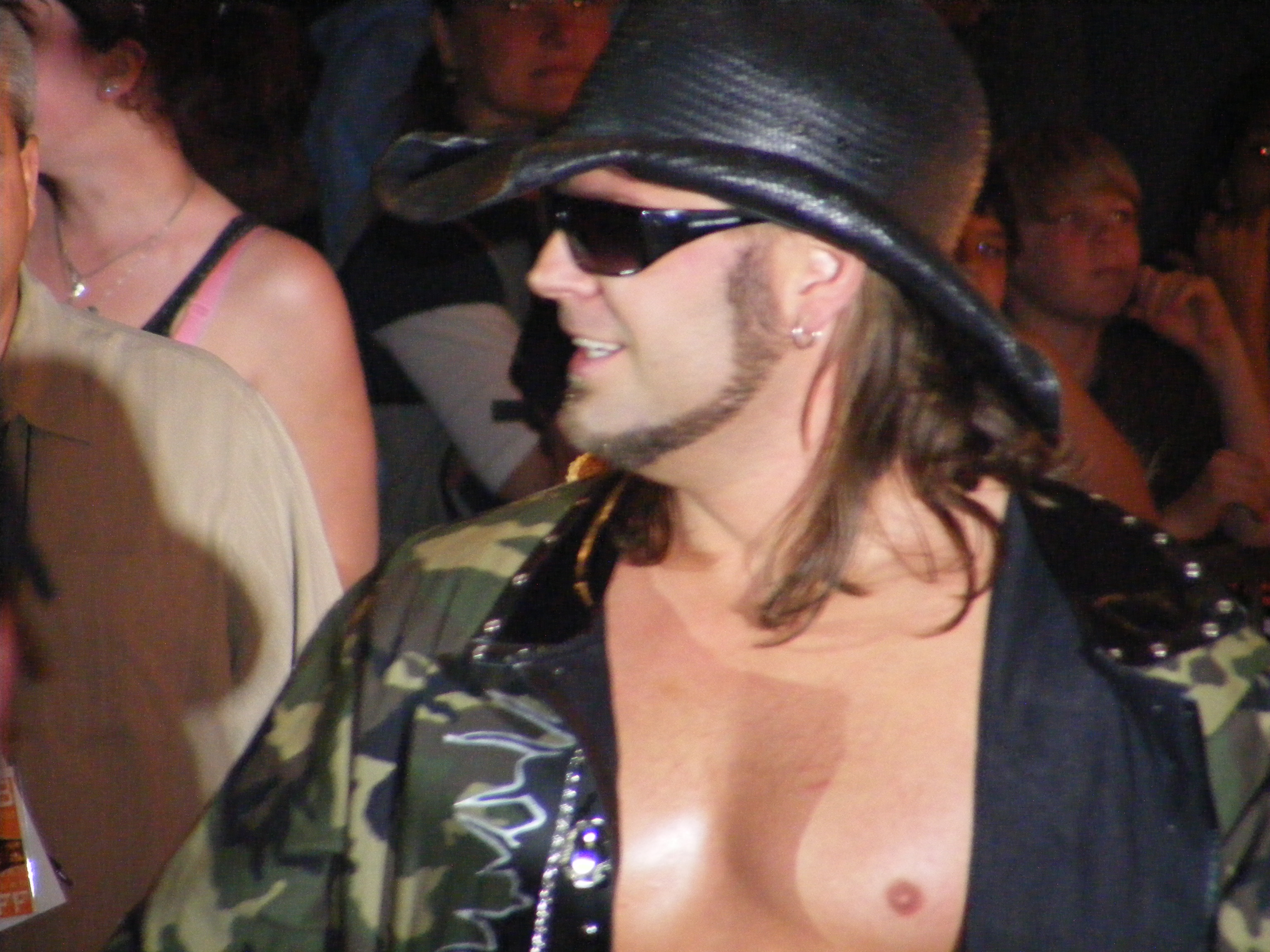
James Storm fought Rhino in an Elevation X match at Destination X.

There were no major issues suffered from the Barbed Wire Massacre. It was reported after the event that there were issues ordering the show in the Australian market.

On the February 14, 2008, episode of Impact!, Tomko announced he attacked Christian Cage at the event because he no longer wanted an alliance with Cage and felt he could become a star on his own. Tomko then joined The Angle Alliance later on the same episode. On the February 21, 2008, episode of Impact!, it was revealed a Six-Man Tag Team match pitting the team of Cage, Samoa Joe, and Kevin Nash against The Angle Alliance (Kurt Angle, A.J. Styles, and Tomko) was planned for the Destination X PPV event on March 9, 2008. At Destination X, Cage, Joe, and Nash under The Unlikely Alliance moniker defeated The Angle Alliance.

Following Against All Odds, Team 3D were forced to weigh in before each contest, which created a feud with the team of Curry Man and Shark Boy, leading to a Fish Market Street Fight between the two teams, with the stipulation that if Team 3D could not make weight they would be fired from TNA. At the event, Management Director Jim Cornette announced that if Team 3D made weight that night they would not have to abide by a weight restriction henceforth. Team 3D marked in below the mark prior to the contest; however eventually lost the encounter.

At Destination X, Robert Roode fought Booker T in a Stand By Your Man Strap match. Cornette announced on the February 14 episode of Impact!, that Booker T and Roode would face in another match at Destination X. On the March 6, 2008, episode of Impact!, Cornette announced that Booker T and Roode would face in a Stand By Your Man Strap match, in which if Booker T won then Traci Brooks would be allowed to beat Payton Banks with a strap ten times and vice versa. Roode won the bout at Destination X. After the contest, Sharmell returned from injury attacking Roode and Banks. This resulted in an Intergender Tag Team Six Sides of Steel Cage match at TNA's Lockdown PPV event on April 13, 2008, pitting Roode and Banks against Booker T and Sharmell, which the later team won.

TNA held the second-ever Elevation X match at Destination X between Rhino and James Storm. On the February 14 episode of Impact!, Rhino challenged Storm to the contest at the event. On the February 28, 2008, episode of Impact!, Storm defeated Young to win the TNA World Beer Drinking Championship in a Ladder match. Rhino stole the championship belt on the March 6, 2008 episode of Impact! and destroyed it by bashing it against a ring post, thus ending the storyline over the title between Storm and Young. Rhino was the victor in the encounter at the event.

After winning the TNA X Division Championship at Against All Odds, Jay Lethal went on to defend the title against Petey Williams at Destination X. Lethal retained the title at the event. However, the storyline between Steiner and Williams continued after Against All Odds, with the two creating a partnership, in which Steiner gave Williams the TNA X Division Feast or Fired Title shot, which Williams used on the April 17, 2008 episode of Impact! to win the title. Meanwhile, Steiner went on to use the TNA World Heavyweight Feast or Fired Title shot at TNA's Sacrifice PPV event on May 11, 2008, in a losing effort against then-champion Samoa Joe and Kaz in a 3-Way Dance.

After Against All Odds, the feud between Abyss and Judas Mesias ended, with Abyss disappearing from TNA after the February 14 episode of Impact!, when he removed his mask and left the arena. Abyss returned at TNA's Slammiversary PPV event on June 6, 2008, in new attire still wearing a mask.

In October 2017, with the launch of the Global Wrestling Network, the event became available to stream on demand.

== Results ==
No.	Results	Stipulations	Times
1	A.J. Styles and Tomko (c) defeated B.G. James and Bob Armstrong	Tag team match for the TNA World Tag Team Championship (This was James' Feast or Fired Tag Team Title match)	7:45
2	Traci Brooks defeated Payton Banks	Singles match	5:07
3	Scott Steiner (X) defeated Petey Williams (World)	Singles match for the TNA X Division and TNA World Heavyweight Championships Feast or Fired Briefcases	9:24
4	Eric Young (c) defeated James Storm (with Jackie Moore)	Singles match for the TNA World Beer Drinking Championship	7:49
5	Awesome Kong (c) (with Raisha Saeed) defeated ODB	Singles match for the TNA Women's Knockout Championship	6:54
6	Abyss defeated Judas Mesias (with Father James Mitchell)	Barbed Wire Massacre	14:51
7	Booker T vs. Robert Roode (with Payton Banks) ended in a double countout	Singles match	9:17
8	The Motor City Machine Guns (Alex Shelley and Chris Sabin) and Jay Lethal defeated Johnny Devine (c) and Team 3D (Brother Devon and Brother Ray)	Street Fight for the TNA X Division Championship (Note: Since Lethal got the pin for his team, he became X Division Champion and Team 3D was now subject to a weight limit. Had Devine and Team 3D won, the X Division would have been forced to disband.)	12:30
9	Kurt Angle (c) (with Karen Angle) defeated Christian Cage	Singles match for the TNA World Heavyweight Championship with Samoa Joe as the Special Outside Enforcer	20:40
(c) / – the champion(s) heading into the match
