= TNA World Beer Drinking Championship =

Professional wrestling championship

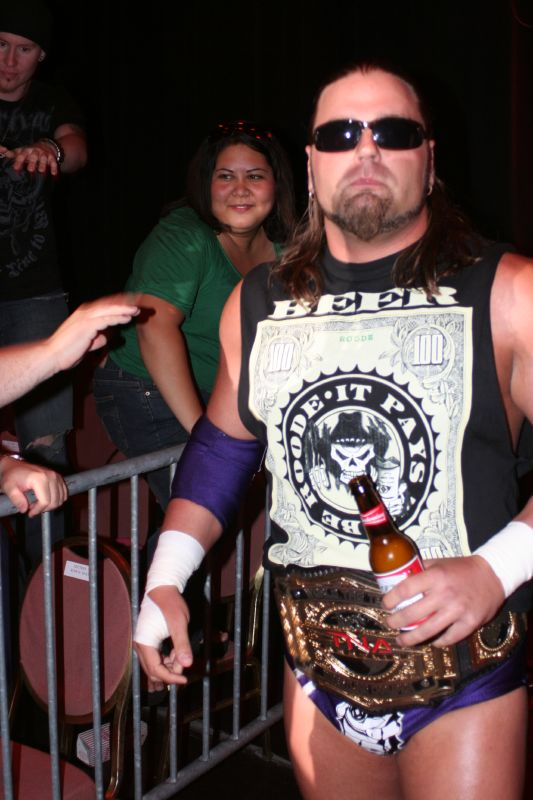
- James Storm (pictured with the TNA World Tag Team Championship) introduced the TNA World Beer Drinking Championship.

Details
- Promotion: Total Nonstop Action Wrestling (TNA)
- Date established: November 11, 2007
- Date retired: February 26, 2008 (aired March 6, 2008)
Statistics
- First champion: James Storm
- Final champion: James Storm
- Most reigns: James Storm (2 reigns)
- Longest reign: Eric Young (106 days)
- Shortest reign: James Storm (<1 day)
- Oldest champion: James Storm (30 years and 269 days)
- Youngest champion: Eric Young (27 years and 332 days)
- Heaviest champion: Eric Young (232 lbs (105 kg))
- Lightest champion: James Storm (230 lbs (104kg))

The TNA World Beer Drinking Championship was an unsanctioned professional wrestling championship owned by the Total Nonstop Action Wrestling (TNA) promotion. The championship was introduced on November 11, 2007 at TNA's Genesis pay-per-view (PPV) event. It was active until February 26, 2008 when the title belt was destroyed at the taping of the March 6, 2008 episode of TNA's television program TNA Impact!.

It debuted as a part of a feud between James Storm and Eric Young; they were involved in a storyline that revolved around drinking beer. Like most professional wrestling championships, the title was won as a result of a scripted match or backstage segment. There were three reigns among two wrestlers in the title's brief history. Storm was the first and last champion.

== History ==
The TNA World Beer Drinking Championship was unveiled on November 11, 2007 at TNA's Genesis PPV event, during a backstage segment involving James Storm, Ms. Jackie, and Eric Young. The storyline behind this title began on the October 25, 2007 episode of Impact!, where Storm defeated Young to advance in the 2007 Fight for the Right Tournament. During the contest, Ms. Jackie, who was accompanying Storm, interfered and helped Storm by standing on the ring apron and distracting Young. When Storm was about to attack Young from behind, Young jumped out of the way causing Storm to knock Ms. Jackie off the apron and to the floor. Afterwards, Young went to check on Ms. Jackie, thereby allowing Storm to gain the upper hand and win the match. Following the contest, Ms. Jackie and Storm gave Young a beer, which he guzzled down hastily.

Leading up to Genesis, Young and Storm had a beer drinking contest on the November 1, 2007 episode of Impact!, after Storm lost to Kaz in a semi-final match of The 2007 Fight for the Right Tournament. Young won the championship at Genesis, after Storm passed out during the segment. This led to a bout between Storm and Young at TNA's Turning Point PPV event on December 2, 2007, which Young won. Storm challenged Young to another drinking contest on the January 3, 2008 episode of Impact!. On January 6, 2008 at TNA's Final Resolution PPV event, Storm and Young competed in what was called the Beer Drinking Championship Series, which was a series of drinking contests.

The first round was a "never have I ever" round, in which the participants had to admit to experiences they had never been involved in. If the opponent had partaken in a similar action he was forced to drink a shot. Storm was the victor of this round. The second round was contested with both participants having beer bottles taped to their hands and neither being allowed to go to the bathroom. Young won after Storm wet himself, which was confirmed by Ms. Jackie, now named Jackie Moore. The third round involved the two drinking shots; it was won by Storm after Young passed out because Storm had drugged him. With Storm winning two contests to one, he earned the ability to determine their match at TNA's Against All Odds PPV event on February 10, 2008. At Against All Odds, Young defeated Storm to retain the TNA World Beer Drinking Championship after Rhino interfered attacking Storm. On the February 28, 2008 episode of Impact!, a Ladder match for the World Beer Drinking Championship was held between Storm and Young. Storm won the bout after Moore climbed a ladder and retrieved the championship for Storm without the referee seeing. On the March 6, 2008 episode of Impact!, Rhino stole the title belt from Storm and bashed the belt across a ring post, thus destroying it and ending the storyline surrounding it.

=== Belt designs ===
When the title was revealed at Genesis, Chris Sokol of the Canadian Online Explorer spoke of its design in his review of the event. Sokol stated it looked like "a plastic spinner belt with a beer bottle attached to it." The belt was actually a toy WWE Championship.

== Reigns ==
James Storm was the first and last champion in the title's history. He also held the record for most reigns with two and the shortest reign in the history at one day. Eric Young holds the record for longest reign at 106 days. There were three reigns among two wrestlers in the title history.

Key
No.	Overall reign number
Reign	Reign number for the specific champion
Days	Number of days held
<1	Reign lasted less than a day

No.	Champion	Championship change			Reign statistics		Notes	Ref.
No.	Champion	Date	Event	Location	Reign	Days	Notes	Ref.
1	James Storm	November 11, 2007	Genesis (2007)	Orlando, Florida	1	<1	James Storm introduced the championship during a backstage drinking contest with Eric Young.	
2	Eric Young	November 11, 2007	Genesis (2007)	Orlando, Florida	1	106	Eric Young took the championship after defeating James Storm in a drinking contest.	
3	James Storm	February 25, 2008	TNA Impact!	Orlando, Florida	2	1	This was a Ladder match. This episode aired on tape delay on February 28, 2008	
—		March 6, 2008	TNA Impact!	Orlando, Florida			Rhino destroys the championship belt, thus deactivating the title. This episode aired on tape delay on March 13, 2008.	

=== Combined reigns ===
Rank	Wrestler	No. of reigns	Combined days
1	Eric Young	1	106
2	James Storm	2	1

== See also ==
- List of former championships in Total Nonstop Action Wrestling
