= TNA Turning Point (2007) =

2007 Total Nonstop Action Wrestling pay-per-view event

Turning Point (2007)
- Promotional poster featuring Judas Mesias, Abyss, and Black Reign
- Promotion: Total Nonstop Action Wrestling
- Date: December 2, 2007
- City: Orlando, Florida
- Venue: Impact Zone
- Attendance: 900
- Tagline: Silent Night...Bloody Night

Pay-per-view chronology
← Previous; Genesis	Next → Final Resolution

Turning Point chronology
← Previous; 2006	Next → 2008

The 2007 Turning Point was a professional wrestling pay-per-view (PPV) event produced and by the Total Nonstop Action Wrestling (TNA) promotion, which took place on December 2, 2007 at the Impact Zone in Orlando, Florida. It was the fourth event under the Turning Point chronology, and the twelfth and last event on the 2007 TNA PPV schedule. Eight professional wrestling matches were featured on the event's card with only one featuring a championship.

The main event was a Six Man Tag Team match, in which the team of Samoa Joe, Kevin Nash, and Eric Young defeated The Angle Alliance (Kurt Angle, A.J. Styles, and Tomko). In another tag team match, Christian Cage and Robert Roode were defeated by Booker T and Kaz. In a high-profile match, Johnny Devine and Team 3D (Brother Devon and Brother Ray) wrestled Jay Lethal and The Motor City Machine Guns (Alex Shelley and Chris Sabin) in a Six Man Tag Team Tables Match. Devine and Team 3D won the contest. The contest between Abyss and Raven versus Black Reign and Rellik in a Match of 10,000 Tacks was also featured on the card. Abyss and Raven won the encounter.

The event is remembered for Scott Hall's failure to show up for the event and for Samoa Joe's unscripted rant against the promotion. It also marks the first time the Feast or Fired match was held. The professional wrestling section of the Canadian Online Explorer website rated the entire event a six and a half out of ten, higher than the 2006 event's rating of six.

== Production ==
=== Background ===
TNA announced in mid-September 2007 that the fourth Turning Point event would take place on December 2, 2007. The location was not announced, but various news sites speculated that it would be held outside the TNA Impact Zone in Orlando, Florida. However, in mid-October, TNA announced the event would be held at the TNA Impact! Zone. TNA created a section on their official website for the event. The promotional poster was released through PPV providers featuring Abyss, Black Reign, and Judas Mesias and the tagline "Silent Night...Bloody Night". TNA held a thirty-minute Road to Turning Point special on Spike TV to promote the event.

=== Storylines ===
Turning Point featured eight professional wrestling matches that involved different wrestlers from pre-existing scripted feuds and storylines. Wrestlers portrayed villains, heroes, or less distinguishable characters in the scripted events that built tension and culminated in a wrestling match or series of matches.

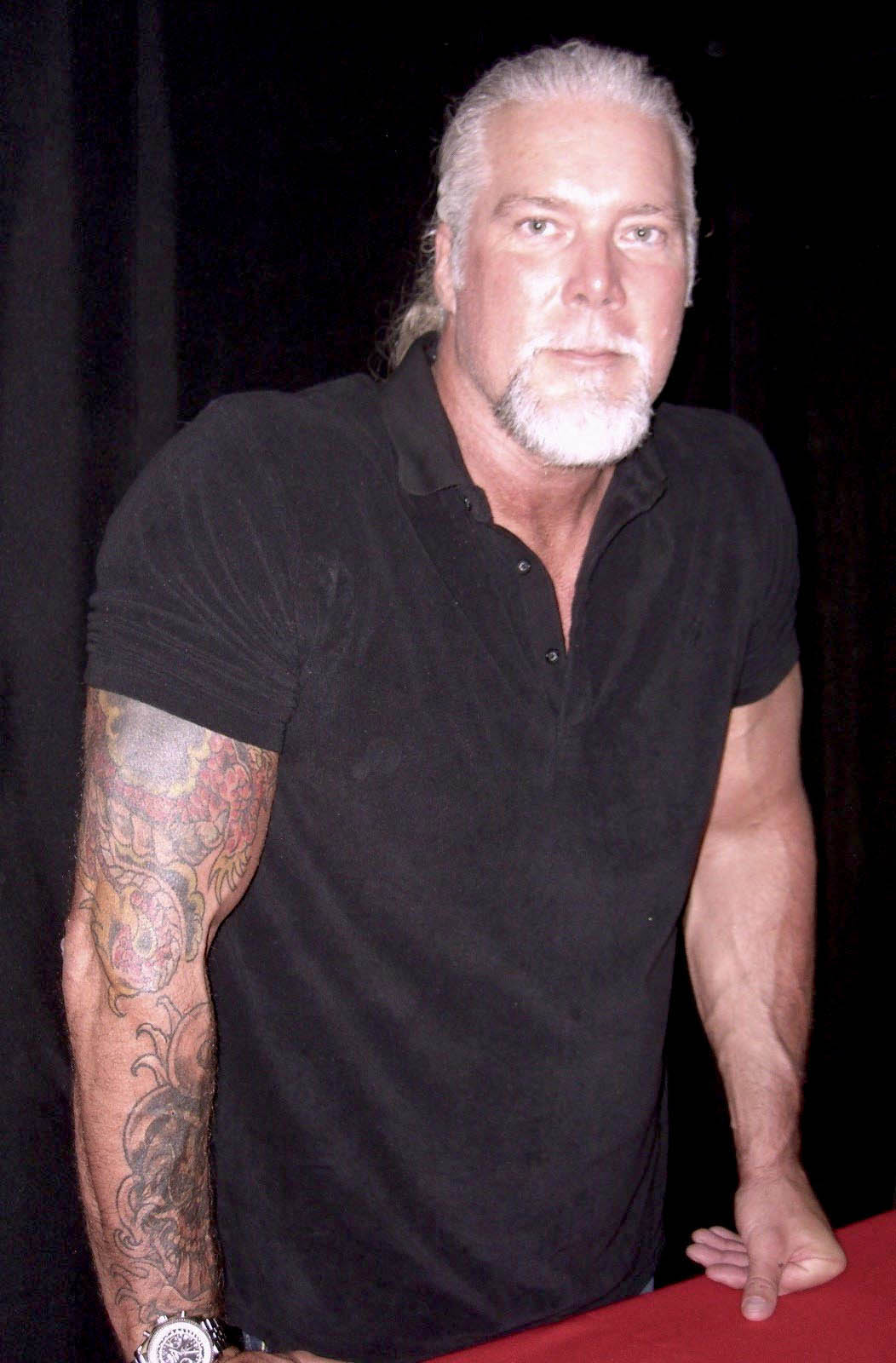
Kevin Nash requested the Six Man Tag Team match at Turning Point.

The main event was a Six Man Tag Team match pitting The Angle Alliance (Kurt Angle, A.J. Styles, Tomko) against the team of Scott Hall, Kevin Nash, and Samoa Joe. Jim Cornette, Management Director, made the announcement on the November 15 episode of TNA's television program TNA Impact!. The match was at the request of Hall and Nash, with the stipulation that they would be able to choose a mystery partner. Their mystery partner was later revealed to be Joe during the same episode. The buildup to this encounter began on the November 8 episode of Impact!, when Nash questioned if Hall was Sting's mystery partner in a tag team match against Nash and Angle at TNA's Genesis PPV event on November 11. Hall denied he was Sting's partner and at the sametime mended an alliance with Nash. At Genesis, then-champion Angle and Nash faced Sting and the debuting Booker T in a tag team match for the TNA World Heavyweight Championship. Nash almost won the encounter before being attacked by Angle, thus costing him the pinfall and the championship, and creating a rivalry between the two.

The match Kaz and Booker T versus Christian Cage and Robert Roode was also scheduled. On the November 15 episode of Impact!, Booker T, along with his real-life wife Sharmell, made their Impact! debut signing talent contracts. They were interrupted by Cage, sparking a rivalry between Booker T and Cage. On the November 29 episode of Impact!, Cage manipulated Roode into thinking that Booker T was trying to steal his spot at becoming a main star in the promotion. Roode went on to fight Booker T later in the episode in a losing effort. After the encounter, Cage and Roode attacked Booker T, which led Kaz to come to his aid in the situation. A tag team match between the four was later promoted by TNA for Turning Point.

Another featured match on the card was a Six Man Tag Team Tables match pitting the teams of Johnny Devine and Team 3D (Brother Devon and Brother Ray) against Jay Lethal and The Motor City Machine Guns (Alex Shelley and Chris Sabin) (MCMG). On the October 18 episode of Impact!, Team 3D attacked MCMG and declared they were going to destroy the X Division to which they belonged. This was due to MCMG helping The Steiner Brothers (Rick and Scott Steiner) defeat Team 3D at TNA's Bound for Glory PPV event on October 14. The two teams then fought at Genesis with MCMG winning the contest. Later in the event, Team 3D attacked and stole the TNA X Division Championship from then-champion Lethal. On the November 15 episode of Impact!, Devine, an X Division wrestler, turned on the division and joined Team 3D, helping to attack MCMG and Lethal. A Six Man Tag Team Tables match was later added to the Turning Point card.

Several lower profile matches were featured at Turning Point. Two were Gail Kim defending the TNA Women's World Championship against Awesome Kong and the team of Abyss and Rhino versus the team of Black Reign and Rellik in a Match of 10,000 Tacks. Also scheduled was the first-ever Feast or Fired match. Kim's title defense was announced on the November 22 episode of Impact! and was the result of a brawl between the two on the November 15 episode of Impact!. Four cases would be hung above four padded turnbuckles, with three holding a title shot while the last holding a pink slip. The Match of 10,000 Tacks was the result of a Shop of Horrors match between Abyss and Reign at Genesis. Abyss won the match, but after the encounter Rellik debuted, creating an alliance with Reign by attacking Abyss. On the November 15 episode of Impact!, Abyss defeated Reign and Rellik in a 3-Way Dance. Afterwards, Reign and Rellik attacked Abyss until Rhino came to Abyss' aid. Impact! commentator Mike Tenay later announced on the November 22 episode of Impact!, that Rhino and Abyss were scheduled to face Reign and Rellik in a Match of 10,000 Tacks at Turning Point 2007.

== Event ==
=== Miscellaneous ===
The event featured employees other than the wrestlers involved in the matches. Mike Tenay and Don West were the commentators for the telecast. David Penzer was the ring announcer for all contests. Earl Hebner, Rudy Charles, Mark "Slick" Johnson, and Andrew Thomas were referees for the encounters. Jeremy Borash and Crystal Louthan conducted interviews throughout the event. Besides wrestlers who appeared in a wrestling role, Christy Hemme, Jackie Moore, Ms. Brooks, Karen Angle, and Sharmell were also featured on the broadcast.

=== Preliminary matches ===
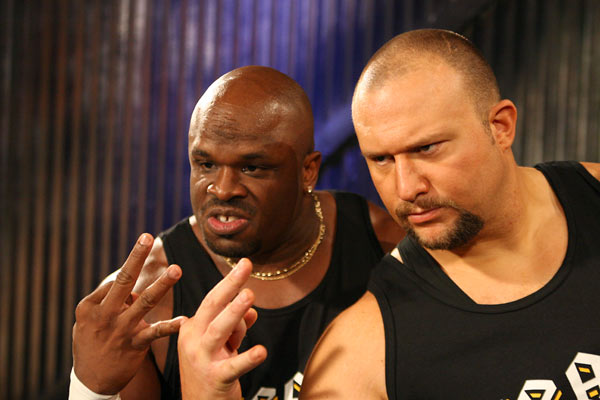
Team 3D (Brother Devon [left] and Brother Ray [right]) teamed with Johnny Devine to face Jay Lethal and The Motor City Machine Guns (Alex Shelley and Chris Sabin) in a Six Man Tag Team Tables Match at Turning Point.

The first match to take place on the event's card was the Six Man Tag Team Tables match pitting the team of Johnny Devine and Team 3D against the team of Jay Lethal and MCMG. The match lasted fourteen minutes and fifty-nine seconds. The objective of a Six Man Tag Team Tables match is to drive one of the members of the opposing team through a table. During the contest, Lethal drove Devine through a table with a driving elbow drop. However, as the referee was scripted to appear unconscious, this allowed Team 3D to knockout MCMG and Lethal with the X Division Championship belt. They followed by draping Devine over Lethal, making it appear as though Devine had driven Lethal through the table, thus winning the match for his team.

Velvet-Love Entertainment (Angelina Love and Velvet Sky) faced off against the team of ODB and Roxxi Laveaux in a tag team match next. The duration of the contest was six minutes and two seconds. Velvet-Love Entertainment were the victors by pinfall after Love kicked Laveaux in the face.

Eric Young fought James Storm, who was accompanied by Jackie Moore, in the third encounter which lasted twelve minutes and twenty-one seconds. Young won the contest with a roll-up pin while Storm was accidentally distracted by the referee.

TNA held the first-ever Feast or Fired match next. In the Feast or Fired match, four briefcases are held above four different turnbuckles on poles, with three having future title shots for the TNA World Heavyweight, TNA X Division, and TNA World Tag Team Championships; the remaining briefcase holds a pink slip, leading to that wrestler's contract termination. A wrestler must retrieve the briefcase and then leave the ring in order to gain official possession of the case. The participants in the bout were Scott Steiner, Senshi, B.G. James, Petey Williams, Shark Boy, Lance Hoyt, Christopher Daniels, Elix Skipper, Homicide, Hernandez, Kip James, Jimmy Rave, Chris Harris, and Sonjay Dutt. The contest lasted eleven minutes and fifty-five seconds. Christy Hemme accompanied Rave and Hoyt to the ring for the contest. Williams was the first to obtain a case in the match. Kip was the second; however he threw it to his Voodoo Kin Mafia tag team partner B.G. James who was standing at ringside, thus giving B.G. James possession of the case. A short time later, Senshi retrieved the third case. The final case was collected by Steiner, after he took it from Kip, who had taken it from the retriever Daniels.

=== Main event matches ===
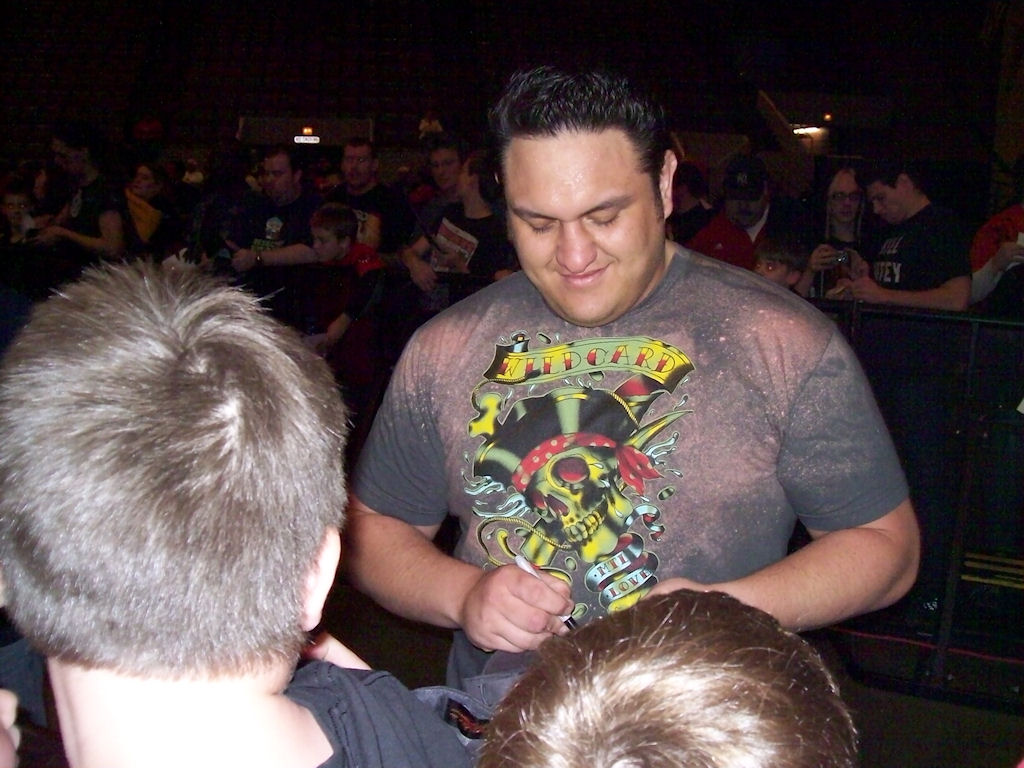
Samoa Joe gave an unscripted rant prior to the main event.

Gail Kim defended the TNA Women's World Championship against Awesome Kong in the fifth bout. It lasted eight minutes and twenty-three seconds. During the match, Kong repeatedly refused to listen to the referee's orders, and eventually pushed the referee down, resulting in a disqualification and Kim retained the title.

The Match of 10,000 Tacks was up next, pitting Abyss and Raven against Black Reign and Rellik. Rhino was originally supposed to be a part of the match, but was removed due to a neck injury he sustained in a previous match; he was replaced with Raven. The encounter lasted fourteen minutes and forty-one seconds. Raven forced Reign through a table covered with thumbtacks during the contest. The team of Abyss and Raven won the bout, after Abyss slammed Rellik into a pile of thumbtacks and then gained the pinfall victory. Abyss required stitches as a result of this match.

In the next match, the team of Kaz and Booker T, accompanied by Sharmell, fought the team of Christian Cage and Robert Roode, accompanied by Ms. Brooks. The duration of the bout was fifteen minutes and fifty seconds. Booker T won the match for his team by pinfall after slamming Cage into the mat face first with his Axe Kick maneuver. Kaz cracked his skull during the encounter.

The main event was a Six Man Tag Team match originally planned to pit the team of Samoa Joe, Kevin Nash, and Scott Hall against The Angle Alliance (Kurt Angle, A.J. Styles, and Tomko), who were accompanied by Karen Angle. Hall had announced that morning that he would not show up. Prior to the match, Joe delivered an unscheduled, unscripted speech to the crowd explaining his anger and distaste for Hall's failure to show up for the event. He said that Hall "punked out on me and on every single fan in this building tonight", and concluded: "Scott Hall, chico, kiss my ass, you punked out and you're a punk". He followed this by announcing Hall's replacement in the match: Eric Young. The six men fought for a total of nine minutes and thirty-one seconds, before Joe slammed Tomko into the mat with his Muscle Buster maneuver to gain the pinfall.

== Reception ==
A total of nine hundred people attended the event. Canadian Online Explorer writer Chris Sokol rated the entire event a six and a half out of ten, which was the same rating given to the 2006 Turning Point event. It was higher than the six out of ten given to TNA's next event Final Resolution. It was lower than the seven and a half out of ten given to TNA's previous Genesis PPV event. Compared to rival World Wrestling Entertainment's Armageddon PPV event held on December 16, Turning Point was rated lower as Armageddon was given a seven out of ten by Bob Kapur. In Sokol's review four matches were rated a seven out of ten, his overall highest rating given in the review. The first was the Six Man Tag Team Tables match, which Sokol felt "was a solid match." The second match given this score was the Match of 10,000 Tacks, which Sokol believed to be "just an all out brawl." Sokol rated the Kaz and Booker T versus Christian Cage and Robert Roode bout seven out of ten and stated he thought it was a "good match." The main event was the final one with this rating, which Sokol thought was a "decent" match. The women's tag team match was the lowest rated match in Sokol's review, with a 5 out of 10. Regarding the entire event, Sokol thought that "despite all the chaos, the PPV still churned out some good matches." Wade Keller of the Pro Wrestling Torch published a review of the event, in which his highest rating of two and a three-quarter stars out of five was given to the Six Man Tag Team Tables match, while his lowest of half a star out of five was given to the women's tag team match and the Storm versus Young bout. The Kaz and Booker T versus Cage and Roode bout was given a two and a half out of five stars. The main event was rated one and a half out of five stars. The event was released on DVD on February 5, 2008 by TNA Home Video.

== Aftermath ==
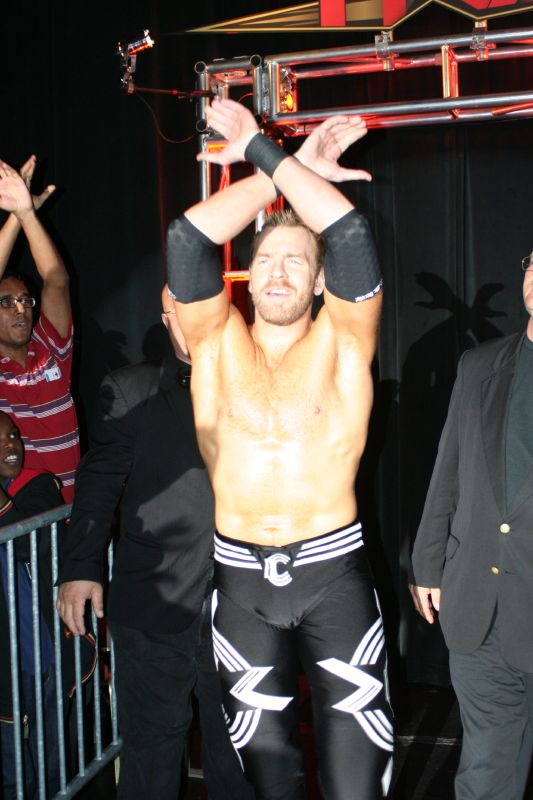
Christian Cage challenged Kurt Angle for the TNA World Heavyweight Championship at Final Resolution and Against All Odds.

Following Turning Point, A.J. Styles tried to unite Christian's Coalition and The Angle Alliance. On the December 6, 2007 episode of Impact, Christian Cage became leader of a joint alliance, until Kurt Angle and Robert Roode attacked him at the end of the episode. This led to Angle defending the TNA World Heavyweight Championship against Cage at TNA's Final Resolution PPV event on January 6, 2008. There, Angle defeated Cage after Styles attacked Cage, effectively siding with The Angle Alliance. The two fought again for the title at TNA's Against All Odds PPV event on February 10, 2008, where Tomko cost Cage the title, siding with The Angle Alliance as well.

At Final Resolution, Roode and Booker T fought again in a Mixed Tag Team match. Sharmell had come to Roode's manager Ms. Brooks' defense on the December 13, 2007 episode of Impact! after Roode belittled her for losing a match, providing a reason for the encounter. At Final Resolution, Sharmell and Booker T defeated Roode and Ms. Brooks in a Mixed Tag Team match. After the encounter, Roode accidentally punched Sharmell, injuring her in the storyline. This led to a match between Roode and Booker T at Against All Odds, which ended in a double count-out. At TNA's Destination X PPV event on March 9, 2008, Roode defeated Booker T in a Stand By Your Man Strap match. Sharmell returned after this encounter, resulting in an Intergender Tag Team Six Sides of Steel Cage match at TNA's Lockdown PPV event on April 13, 2008 pitting Roode and his new manager Payton Banks against Booker T and Sharmell, which the later team won.

Team 3D's feud with the X Division continued into Final Resolution. The two teams fought again on the December 6, 2007 episode of Impact! in a Six Man Tag Team Ladder match, which Johnny Devine and Team 3D won. On the December 20, 2007 episode of Impact!, Jay Lethal and MCMG defeated Devine and Team 3D in a Double North Pole match to determine the stipulation to their match at Final Resolution; choosing an Ultimate X match over a Plate glass Tables match. On the January 3, 2008 episode of Impact!, Team 3D attacked and injured MCMG in the storyline by beating their hands with kendo sticks, which made it hard to compete in an Ultimate X match in storyline. At Final Resolution, Devine and Team 3D won the bout. The feud came to an end at Against All Odds, where Lethal and MCMG defeated Devine and Team 3D in a Street Fight to save the X Division from disbandment.

Gail Kim defended the newly named TNA Women's Knockout Championship against Awesome Kong at Final Resolution in a No Disqualification match and successfully retained the title. This led to another fight between Kong and Kim on the January 10, 2008 episode of Impact!, in which Kong defeated Kim to win back the championship.

The contents of the Feast or Fired briefcases were revealed on the December 13, 2007 episode of Impact!. However, on the December 6, 2007 episode of Impact!, Christopher Daniels defeated Senshi with Elix Skipper as Special Guest Referee to win his briefcase. Prior to the unveiling, Scott Steiner defeated fellow briefcase holders Daniels, Petey Williams, and B.G. James to get to decide to either switch his briefcase with another or take a $50,000 buyout. Steiner chose to switch his briefcase with Williams'. Williams' new and Steiner's old briefcases were then opened, awarding Williams a future TNA World Heavyweight Championship match. James' briefcase was next, giving him a future TNA World Tag Team Championship match with a partner of his choice. Steiner's new and Williams' old briefcase as well as Daniels' case was open simultaneously next. Awarding Steiner a future TNA X Division Championship match and giving Daniels the pink slip, effectively firing him in storyline. After this segment, Steiner and Williams started a storyline over their briefcases, leading up to Against All Odds where Steiner defeated Williams to gain control over both cases. This led to Steiner and Williams starting a partnership, in which Steiner gave Williams the TNA X Division Championship title shot which he used on the April 17, 2008 episode of Impact! to win the title. Steiner went on to use his title shot at TNA's Sacrifice PPV event on May 11, 2008 in a losing effort against then-champion Samoa Joe and Kaz in a 3-Way Dance. James announced his tag team partner on the January 17, 2008 episode of Impact! as his real-life father Bob Armstrong. The two revealed on the January 24, 2008 episode of Impact! that they would use their title match at Against All Odds. The two failed to win the title from A.J. Styles and Tomko at the event.

In October 2017, with the launch of the Global Wrestling Network, the event became available to stream on demand.

=== Effects of Scott Hall's no-showing ===
Leading up to Turning Point 2007, TNA officials began to suspect Scott Hall would not show up at the event, as the last contact with him prior to the event was earlier that morning. TNA officials soon received word from Hall that he was suffering from food poisoning and would not be able to attend. As a result of the no-show, officials approached Samoa Joe and asked him to help take blame off the company for Hall's no-show and to help promote talent in TNA by giving an announcement before introducing Eric Young as Hall's replacement. Joe's announcement went five minutes longer than originally planned, which upset several individuals in TNA. At one point during his announcement, he asked a person off-screen if they were angry and to go ahead and fire him, as he did not care; this individual was the legitimate president of TNA, Dixie Carter. After the event went off the air, a heated exchange between Kevin Nash and Joe took place backstage. The next night, TNA held a meeting and announced that anyone unhappy with their job could void their contract with the company. Senshi was the only one who wished to void his contract. During the meeting, Joe apologized for his actions at the event.

Due to Joe's rant at Turning Point, TNA created a storyline in which Joe was unhappy with his position in the company. On the January 3, 2008 episode of Impact!, Management Director Jim Cornette announced that Joe and Nash would team up to challenge for the TNA World Tag Team Championship at Final Resolution. At the event, Nash abandoned Joe, causing him to fight off both A.J. Styles and Tomko, before succumbing to defeat in the storyline. After this, Joe and Nash began a partnership, in which Nash tried to help Joe deal with his issues over the way he was treated by TNA, and secured him a new contract. Joe was soon given a TNA World Heavyweight Championship match at TNA's Lockdown PPV event on the February 21, 2008 episode of Impact! by Cornette. At Lockdown, Joe defeated Angle in a Six Sides of Steel Cage match to win the TNA World Heavyweight Championship. Joe held the championship until TNA's Bound for Glory IV PPV event on October 12, 2008, in which Sting defeated Joe with help from Nash (who had been inactive since the summer). On the October 30, 2008 episode of Impact!, Nash said the reason Hall missed the match at Turning Point was that Hall did not believe that Joe was "worth the rub". Joe and Nash fought at TNA's Turning Point PPV event on November 9, 2008, which Nash won. Joe and Nash fought again several months later at TNA's Sacrifice PPV event on May 24, 2009, where Joe won, thus ending the feud.

Those within TNA held strong negative feelings toward Hall for missing the event; many felt he should have at least tried to make it to the show. Dixie Carter was upset at Joe's comments prior to the main event, believing Joe tried to go "into business for himself." Chris Sokol wrote in his review: "The old saying was, 'Don't turn your back on the Wolfpack.' However, thats just what Scott Hall did when he decided to no-show his TNA PPV return."

== Results ==
No.	Results	Stipulations	Times
1	Johnny Devine and Team 3D (Brother Devon and Brother Ray) defeated Jay Lethal and The Motor City Machine Guns (Alex Shelley and Chris Sabin)	Tables match	14:59
2	Velvet-Love Entertainment (Angelina Love and Velvet Sky) defeated ODB and Roxxi Laveaux	Tag team match	6:02
3	Eric Young defeated James Storm (with Jackie Moore)	Singles match	12:21
4	Petey Williams, B.G. James, Senshi and Scott Steiner defeated Shark Boy, Lance Hoyt, Christopher Daniels, Elix Skipper, Homicide, Hernandez, Kip James, Jimmy Rave, Chris Harris and Sonjay Dutt	Feast or Fired	11:55
5	Gail Kim (c) defeated Awesome Kong by disqualification	Singles match for the TNA Women's Knockout Championship	8:23
6	Abyss and Raven defeated Rellik and Black Reign	Match of 10,000 tacks	14:41
7	Kaz and Booker T (with Sharmell) defeated Christian Cage and Robert Roode (with Ms. Brooks)	Tag team match	15:50
8	Samoa Joe, Kevin Nash, and Eric Young defeated The Angle Alliance (Kurt Angle, A.J. Styles, and Tomko) (with Karen Angle)	Six-man tag team match	9:31
(c) / – the champion(s) heading into the match
