= TNA Genesis (2007) =

2007 Total Nonstop Action Wrestling pay-per-view event

Genesis (2007)
- Promotional poster featuring various TNA wrestlers
- Promotion: Total Nonstop Action Wrestling
- Date: November 11, 2007
- City: Orlando, Florida
- Venue: TNA Impact! Zone
- Attendance: 900
- Tagline: A New Breed of Company... A New Breed of Wrestler... A New Breed in Wrestling

Pay-per-view chronology
← Previous; Bound for Glory	Next → Turning Point

Genesis chronology
← Previous; 2006	Next → 2009

The 2007 Genesis was a professional wrestling pay-per-view (PPV) event produced by the Total Nonstop Action Wrestling (TNA) promotion, which took place on November 11, 2007, at the TNA Impact! Zone in Orlando, Florida. It was the third event under the Genesis chronology, the last held in the month of November, and the eleventh event of the 2007 TNA PPV schedule. Eight professional wrestling matches were featured on the event's card, four of which were for championships.

The main event was a tag team match for the TNA World Heavyweight Championship, in which then-champion Kurt Angle and Kevin Nash defeated the team of Sting and Booker T; Angle gained the pinfall to retain the title. The final round of The 2007 Fight for the Right Tournament was determined in a ladder match, in which Kaz defeated Christian Cage to become number one contender to the TNA World Heavyweight Championship. Samoa Joe versus Robert Roode was also featured on the card, which Joe won. The Motor City Machine Guns (Alex Shelley and Chris Sabin) defeated Team 3D (Brother Devon and Brother Ray) in a tag team match.

Genesis is noted for the TNA debut of Booker T. The professional wrestling section of the Canadian Online Explorer website rated the entire event a 7.5 out of 10 stars, higher than the 2006 event's rating of 5.

== Production ==
=== Background ===
The third Genesis event was announced in mid-August 2007, scheduled for November 11, 2007 at the TNA Impact Zone in Orlando, Florida. The promotional poster for the gathering was released some time prior through PPV providers featuring various TNA wrestlers. It featured the tagline "A New Breed of Company... A New Breed of Wrestler... A New Breed in Wrestling".

=== Storylines ===
Genesis featured eight professional wrestling matches that involved different wrestlers from pre-existing scripted feuds and storylines. Wrestlers were portrayed as either heels or face in the scripted events that build tension and culminate into a wrestling match or series of matches.

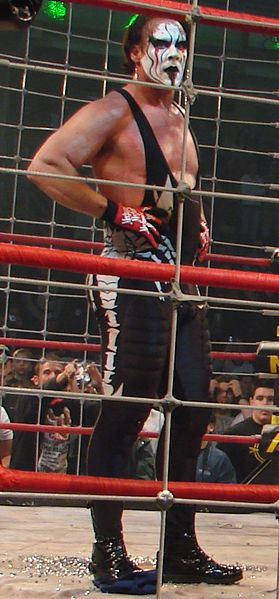
Sting participated in the main event for the TNA World Heavyweight Championship at Genesis.

The primary storyline heading into Genesis involved the TNA World Heavyweight Championship held by then-champion Kurt Angle. On the October 25 episode of TNA's television program TNA Impact!, Management Director Jim Cornette announced that the title would be defended in a tag team match with Angle and Kevin Nash against Sting and a partner of his choosing. The lead-up to this decision began at TNA's previous PPV event Bound for Glory on October 12. There, Sting defeated Angle to win the TNA World Heavyweight Championship. On the October 25 episode of Impact!, with help from Nash, Angle defeated Sting to win back the title. Due to the controversial circumstances, Cornette announced that Angle would defend the title in a tag team match, in which the person that got the pinfall or submission would win the title.

The 2007 Fight for the Right Tournament was held in the weeks prior to the Genesis PPV event. It was an eight-man single-elimination tournament to decide the number contender to the TNA World Heavyweight Championship. It began at Bound for Glory, where a 16-man reverse battle royal was held to determine the participants, where the last remaining eight advanced to the second round and were seeded in order of elimination. Eric Young, Robert Roode, James Storm, Junior Fatu, Chris Sabin, Kaz, Lance Hoyt, and Alex Shelley all advanced to round two. The first bout of the quarterfinals took place on the October 18 episode of Impact! between Shelley and Sabin, which ended in a no contest. This led to a vacant spot in the tournament, which was filled later in the episode when Christian Cage defeated Samoa Joe. Kaz defeated Hoyt, Storm defeated Young, and Fatu defeated Roode in the remaining quarterfinal matches, which took place on the 18 and 25 episodes, respectively. The semi-finals were held on the November 1 episode of Impact!, where Kaz defeated Storm, and Cage defeated Chris Harris—who was a replacement for Fatu—to advance to the finals. On the November 8 episode of Impact!, Cage defeated Kaz, with interference from Cage's allies A.J. Styles and Tomko, to win the tournament. Afterwards, Cornette's stand-in for the night Matt Morgan declared the match a no contest and announced that the tournament would be decided in a ladder match between Cage and Kaz at Genesis due to the interference.

At Bound for Glory, Team 3D (Brother Devon and Brother Ray) fought The Steiner Brothers (Rick and Scott Steiner) in a two out of three falls tables match. They were unsuccessful at defeating the Steiners as The Motor City Machine Guns (Alex Shelley and Chris Sabin; MCMG) interfered and helped the Steiners win the match. On the October 18 episode of Impact!, Team 3D attacked MCMG during their match in The 2007 Fight for the Right Tournament, injuring them in the plot, which led to a spot being vacant. Afterwards, they stated they were going to destroy the X Division, for which MCMG belonged. On the November 1 episode of Impact!, MCMG returned from injury and attacked Team 3D. Afterwards, Shelley challenged Team 3D to a fight at Genesis, which was later made official by TNA.

Joe versus Roode was another featured contest on the event's card. On the October 18 episode of Impact!, Joe fought Cage for the vacant spot in The 2007 Fight for the Right Tournament. During which Roode interfered by attacking Joe, which led to Joe losing the bout. Joe retaliated on the October 25 episode of Impact! by interfering in Roode's quarterfinal match with Fatu, causing him to also lose. TNA commentator Mike Tenay announced on the November 1 episode of Impact! that the two would face in a bout at Genesis.

== Event ==
=== Miscellaneous ===
The event featured employees other than the wrestlers involved in the matches. There were four overall commentators for the event; Mike Tenay and Don West provided English commentary, while Hector Guerrero and Willie Urbina served as the Spanish announce team. David Penzer was the ring announcer for the event, while Earl Hebner, Rudy Charles, Mark "Slick" Johnson, and Andrew Thomas participated as referees for the encounters. Jeremy Borash and Crystal Louthan were used as interviewers throughout the event. Besides wrestlers who were appearing in a wrestling role, James Mitchell, Awesome Kong, SoCal Val, B.G. James and Kip James of the Voodoo Kin Mafia (VKM), Ms. Brooks, Karen Angle, and Sharmell were also featured on the broadcast. A series of backstage segments featured on the show involved James Storm and Eric Young, with Jackie Moore as an observer, involved in a beer drinking contest over what Storm called the "World Beer Drinking Championship". It eventually led to Storm passing out and Young stealing the TNA World Beer Drinking Championship belt.

=== Preliminary matches ===
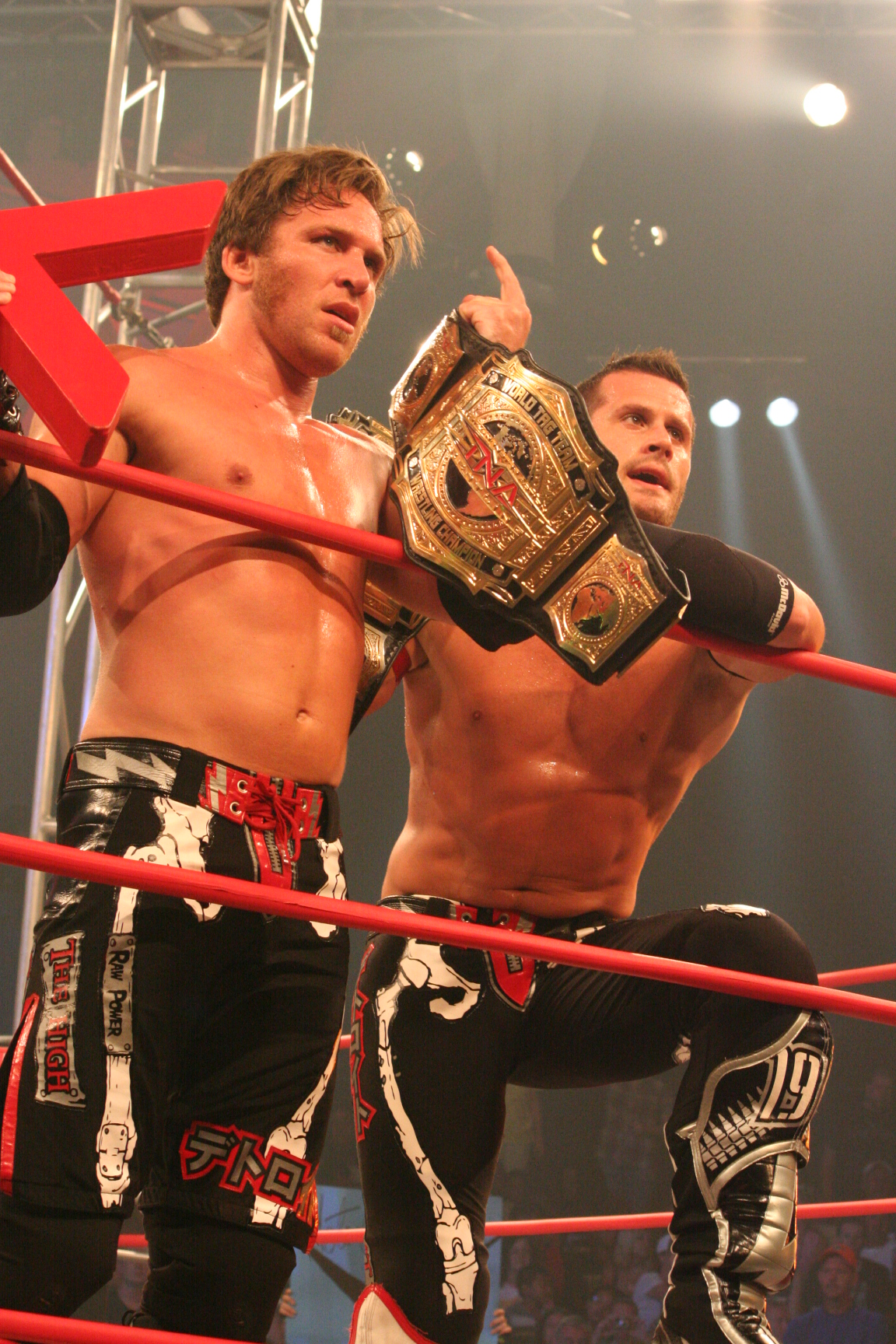
The Motor City Machine Guns (Alex Shelley [right] and Chris Sabin [left]) defeated Team 3D (Brother Devon and Brother Ray) at Genesis in a tag-team match.

The event opened with a Shop of Horrors match between Abyss and Black Reign, which lasted 10 minutes and 13 seconds. In a Shop of Horrors match, all weapons are legal to use, a wrestler can not be counted out, and it can only be won by pinfall or submission. James Mitchell interfered on Reign's behalf during the encounter. Abyss won the contest by pinfall after slamming Reign into the mat with his maneuver, the Black Hole Slam. After the encounter, Abyss grabbed a key that hung around Reign's neck and used it to open a locked building on the stage, which unknowingly was occupied by an unknown wrestler. Reign and the unknown wrestler then proceeded to lock Abyss in the building and push it off the stage.

A series of other preliminary matches followed the Shop of Horrors match. MCMG fought Team 3D in a match that lasted 17 minutes and 37 seconds. MCMG won the contest, after the pair performed their ASCS Rush combination on Ray, which involves a series of kicks to the head and midsection, to gain the pinfall. The TNA Women's World Championship was defended in a Four Way match involving then-champion Gail Kim, Roxxi Laveaux, ODB, and Angel Williams. VKM accompanied Roxxi Laveaux to the ring; they were eventually sent to the backstage area during the contest. After nine minutes and one second, Kim pinned ODB after slamming her into the mat with her maneuver the Happy Ending to retain the title. Sonjay Dutt challenged Jay Lethal for the TNA X Division Championship next. Lethal successfully retained the title after gaining the pinfall following an elbow drop from the top of a padded turnbuckle at 12 minutes and one second. Afterwards, Team 3D attacked Dutt and Lethal, and stole the X Division Championship belt, claiming they were holding it "hostage". Christian's Coalition (A.J. Styles and Tomko) defended the TNA World Tag Team Championship against The Steiner Brothers in a match lasting 10 minutes and 43 seconds. The pair retained the titles, when Styles pinned Rick following a shot to the groin and a chair shot to the head, neither of which was seen by the referee.

=== Main event matches ===
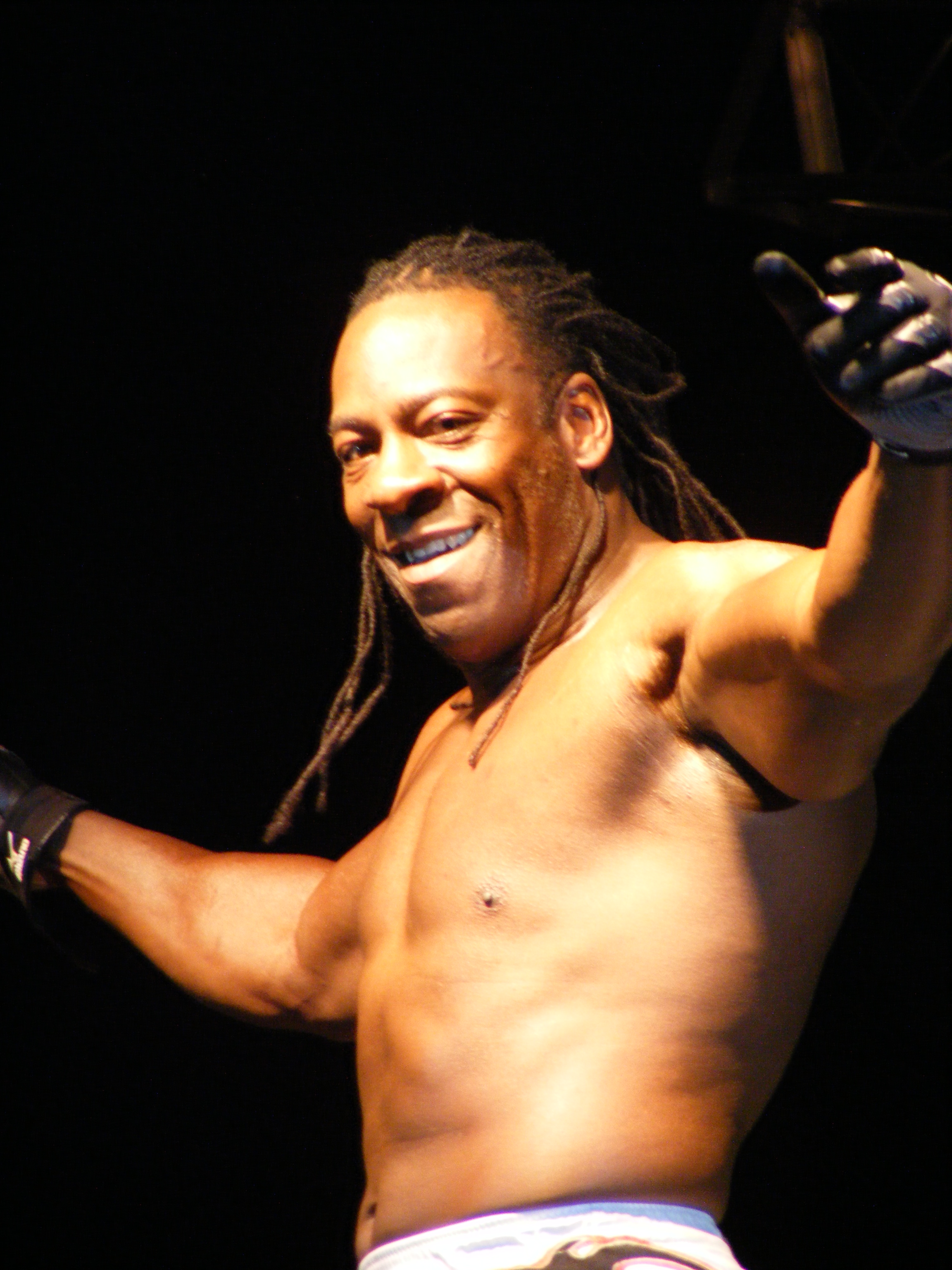
Booker T made his TNA debut and participated in the main event for the TNA World Heavyweight Championship at Genesis.

The sixth match was between Samoa Joe and Robert Roode, who was accompanied by Ms. Brooks. It lasted 15 minutes and 43 seconds, with Joe becoming the victor after slamming Roode into the mat with his Muscle Buster maneuver. Ms. Brooks legitimately passed out at ringside during the contest, believed to be due to overheating. She recovered later in the night after EMTS helped her to the backstage area.

Next, the finals of The 2007 Fight for the Right Tournament were held between Christian Cage and Kaz in a ladder match that lasted 15 minutes and 13 seconds. In a ladder match, an object is hung above the ring and the first to climb a ladder and retrieve the object is the winner. During the match, Cage was legitimately busted open above his eye. Midway through the encounter, the contract fell off the clipboard that hung above the ring, which changed the objective to just grabbing the clipboard to win. Kaz won the contest after causing Cage to fall off the ladder onto Styles and Tomko, who were interfering on Cage's behalf, and then ascending the ladder to grab the clipboard, becoming number one contender to the TNA World Heavyweight Championship in the process.

The main event was a tag team match for the TNA World Heavyweight Championship, pitting the teams of then-champion Kurt Angle, who was accompanied by Karen Angle, and Kevin Nash against Sting and a mystery partner. Before the contest began, Sting introduced his partner as the debuting Booker T, who was accompanied by the also debuting Sharmell. During the 13 minute and 41 second long encounter, the team of Styles and Tomko interfered on Angle's behalf by attacking Booker T and Sting. This led later to Angle hitting Nash with the World Heavyweight Championship belt and the slamming of Sting into the mat with his Olympic Slam maneuver to gain the pinfall and retain the title.

== Reception ==
The attendance for the event was 900. Canadian Online Explorer writer Chris Sokol rated the entire event 7.5 out of 10, which was higher than the 2006 event's rating of 5 out of 10 by Bob Kapur. Sokol rated the ladder match between Cage and Kaz an 8.5, his highest rating of the review, while the main event match for the TNA World Heavyweight Championship was rated a 7. The Women's Title match was rated the lowest with a 5. Sokol stated in his review of the event when referring to Booker T being Sting's mystery partner, he gave TNA "major props". In his comments on the finish to the main event he stated that it was an "intriguing ending to an excellent PPV". Wade Keller of the Pro Wrestling Torch gave the main event two and 1/4 stars out of five, and stated he felt it "wasn't anything special"; however, he felt Booker T looked "refreshed and full of spunk". He believed the ladder match was a "really good spectacle match" and gave it three and a half stars. James Caldwell of the Pro Wrestling Torch gave the main event two stars out of five, while the ladder match three and 3/4 stars. He felt the ladder match was a "very good ladder match" and was the "best match" up to that point. Dan Wilkenfeld of the Pro Wrestling Torch gave the overall event a B rating and believed it was a "step down" from the previous month's Bound for Glory. The event was released on DVD on January 15, 2008 by TNA Home Video.

== Aftermath ==
Following Genesis, A.J. Styles and Tomko went on to join Kurt and Karen Angle to form The Angle Alliance. Due to Angle's attack on Nash at Genesis, Nash and Scott Hall went on to request a Six Man Tag Team match for TNA's Turning Point PPV event on December 2. Nash and Hall were granted their request, and Samoa Joe later was revealed as their mystery partner for the encounter. Hall ended up no-showing the event, and as a result Eric Young filled his place in the bout, which was won by Joe, Nash, and Young.

Team 3D and MCMG continued their rivalry heading into Turning Point, with MCMG now joined by Lethal. On the November 15 episode of Impact!, Johnny Devine, an X Division wrestler, betrayed and attacked MCMG and Lethal, joining Team 3D in the process. This led to the six meeting in a Six Man Tag Team Tables match at Turning Point. Team 3D and Devine went on to win the contest.

The mystery wrestler revealed after the Shop of Horrors match at Genesis was soon after dubbed Rellik. Abyss, now joined by Rhino, went on to feud with both Reign and Rellik leading into Turning Point. The four were promoted to fight in a Match of 10,000 Tacks at the event, but Rhino ended up being replaced by Raven due to an injury. Abyss and Raven won the contest at Turning Point.

Kaz got his TNA World Heavyweight Championship match on the November 15 episode of Impact! against Angle, but failed to win the title. Kaz then went on to team with Booker T in a match against Christian Cage and Robert Roode at Turning Point, which the pair won.

In October 2017, with the launch of the Global Wrestling Network, the event became available to stream on demand.

== Results ==
No.	Results	Stipulations	Times
1	Abyss defeated Black Reign	Shop of Horrors match	10:13
2	The Motor City Machine Guns (Alex Shelley and Chris Sabin) defeated Team 3D (Brother Devon and Brother Ray)	Tag team match	17:37
3	Gail Kim (c) defeated Angel Williams, ODB and Roxxi Laveaux	Four-way match for the TNA Women's World Championship	9:01
4	Jay Lethal (c) defeated Sonjay Dutt	Singles match for the TNA X Division Championship	12:01
5	Christian's Coalition (A.J. Styles and Tomko) (c) defeated The Steiner Brothers (Rick Steiner and Scott Steiner)	Tag team match for the TNA World Tag Team Championship	10:43
6	Samoa Joe defeated Robert Roode (with Ms. Brooks)	Singles match	15:43
7	Kaz defeated Christian Cage	Ladder match to become number one contender to the TNA World Heavyweight Championship; Final Round of the 2007 Fight for the Right Tournament	15:13
8	Kurt Angle (c) and Kevin Nash defeated Sting and Booker T	Tag team match for the TNA World Heavyweight Championship; whoever gained the pinfall or submission won the championship	13:41
(c) / – the champion(s) heading into the match
