= Bound for Glory (2007) =

2007 Total Nonstop Action Wrestling pay-per-view event

- Promotional poster featuring Kurt Angle and Sting
- Promotion: Total Nonstop Action Wrestling
- Date: October 14, 2007
- City: Duluth, Georgia
- Venue: Arena at Gwinnett Center
- Attendance: 4,000
- Tagline: Redemption

Pay-per-view chronology
← Previous; No Surrender	Next → Genesis

Bound for Glory chronology
← Previous; 2006	Next → IV

The 2007 Bound for Glory was a professional wrestling pay-per-view (PPV) event produced by Total Nonstop Action Wrestling (TNA), which took place on October 14, 2007, at the Arena at Gwinnett Center in the Atlanta suburb of Duluth, Georgia. It was the third event under the Bound for Glory chronology. Nine professional wrestling matches were featured on the event's card.

== Production ==
=== Storylines ===
Bound for Glory 2007 featured ten professional wrestling matches that involved different wrestlers from pre-existing scripted feuds and storylines. Wrestlers were portrayed as either heels or face in the scripted events that build tension and culminate into a wrestling match or series of matches.

At the event TNA Wrestling will crown its first ever TNA Women's Knockout Champion in a Gauntlet for the Gold match, separate from the company's previous women's title the Miss TNA Crown Championship the Knockouts title is a 100% wrestling women's championship this time, instead of a tiara that is competed for in different ways every once in a while. Guaranteeing that the TNA Knockouts have an official permanent Knockouts division.

In the build for the main event, Karen Angle accused Sting of slapping her during the TNA World Tag Team Championship match at No Surrender. Kurt Angle believes the accusation and unexpectedly attends Sting's eldest son Garrett Borden's football game in Azusa,California, broadcasting from the sidelines live via satellite throughout the show into the Impact Zone to taunt Sting. After the game, Kurt chased Garrett to his car, leading to a physical altercation in the parking lot before the camera cuts away while is Kurt choking Garrett. This was Garrett Borden's one and only appearance on TNA television.

== Event ==
Other on-screen personnel
Role:	Name:
Commentator	Mike Tenay
Commentator	Don West
Interviewer	Jeremy Borash
Ring announcer	Jeremy Borash
Ring announcer	David Penzer
Referee	Earl Hebner
Referee	Rudy Charles
Referee	Mark Johnson
Referee	Andrew Thomas

== Results ==
No.	Results	Stipulations	Times
1^{D}	The Motor City Machine Guns (Alex Shelley and Chris Sabin) defeated Joey Matthews and Johnny Swinger	Tag team match	—
2	The Latin American Xchange (Homicide and Hernandez) defeated Triple X (Senshi and Elix Skipper)	Ultimate X match to determine the #1 contender to the TNA World Tag Team Championship	11:59
3	Eric Young defeated Robert Roode, James Storm, B.G. James, Kip James, Lance Hoyt, Jimmy Rave, Chris Harris, Chris Sabin, Alex Shelley, Kaz, Petey Williams, Junior Fatu, Havok, Shark Boy and Sonjay Dutt	Fight for the Right Reverse Battle Royal	11:51
4	A.J. Styles and Tomko defeated Team Pacman (Ron Killings and Rasheed Lucius Creed) (c) (with Adam Jones)	Tag team match for the TNA World Tag Team Championship	8:48
5	Jay Lethal (c) defeated Christopher Daniels	Singles match for the TNA X Division Championship	11:02
6	The Steiner Brothers (Rick Steiner and Scott) defeated Team 3D (Brother Ray and Brother Devon)	Two-out-of-three-falls tables match	12:43
7	Gail Kim won by last eliminating Roxxi Laveaux	Gauntlet for the Gold match for the inaugural TNA Women's Knockout Championship	12:22
8	Samoa Joe defeated Christian Cage by submission	Singles match with Matt Morgan as special ringside enforcer	15:48
9	Abyss defeated Raven, Rhino and Black Reign (with James Mitchell)	Monster's Ball match	9:07
10	Sting defeated Kurt Angle (c)	Singles match for the TNA World Heavyweight Championship	18:20
(c) / – the champion(s) heading into the match; D / – this was a dark match

=== Reverse battle royal match ===
This match was Round One of the 2007 Fight for the Right Tournament. In Part One the first 8 out of 16 wrestlers to enter the ring would automatically be entered into the tournament. Part Two and Three would determine who vs who in the tournament based on place in the over the top rope Battle Royal and then a Singles match. : 1st vs 8th, 2nd vs 7th, 3rd vs 6th and 4th vs 5th.

==== Part one ====
This match was a Reverse Battle Royal.

Advanced	Eliminated	Time
Lance Hoyt, Kaz, Alex Shelley, Chris Sabin, James Storm, Eric Young, Robert Roode and Junior Fatu	Jimmy Rave, Havoc, Shark Boy, Petey Williams, Sonjay Dutt, Kip James, B.G. James and Chris Harris	2:35

==== Part two ====
This part was an over the top rope Battle Royal

Entered	Wrestler	Place	Eliminated by	Time
1	Junior Fatu	7th	Hoyt, Kaz, Sabin, Young and Roode	3:00
2	Robert Roode	Advanced to Part Three	-	6:47
3	Kaz	5th	Roode	5:32
4	Alex Shelley	3rd	Young	6:47
5	Eric Young	Advanced to Part Three	-	6:47
6	Chris Sabin	6th	Kaz	4:55
7	Lance Hoyt	4th	Roode	6:06
8	James Storm	8th	Young	0:05

==== Part three ====
This part was a Singles match.

Result	Time
Eric Young (1st) pinned Robert Roode (2nd)	1:31

=== Two out of three falls tables match ===
Elimination	Wrestler	Eliminated by	Elimination move	Time
1	Rick Steiner	Team 3D	Put through a table with a 3D	
2	Brother Ray	Scott Steiner	Put through a table with a Frankensteiner from the top rope	
3	Brother Devon	Steiner Brothers	Put through a table with a Steinerizer	
Winner:	Scott Steiner			

=== Knockout gauntlet match entrances and eliminations ===
Entered	Entrant	Elimination	Eliminated by
1	Ms. Brooks	1	Moore
2	Jackie Moore	3	Kong
3	Shelly Martinez	2	Kong
4	Awesome Kong	5	ODB, Williams and Kim
5	O.D.B.	8	Laveaux
6	Angel Williams	6	Kim and ODB
7	Christy Hemme	4	Kong
8	Gail Kim	-	Winner
9	Talia Madison	7	Kim
10	Roxxi Laveaux	9	Kim

Hemme was never officially eliminated. She was (kayfabe) unable to continue and was removed from the match by EMTs.

== Notes ==
Adam "Pacman" Jones, who is also from Atlanta and appeared on the show, personally purchased 1,500 tickets with the intention of donating them to the Fulton County School District to be handed out as rewards for scholastic achievement and good conduct.
