= Fight for the Right Tournament =

Professional wrestling competition

The Fight for the Right Tournament is a professional wrestling tournament in Total Nonstop Action Wrestling designed to determine a new #1 contender to the World Heavyweight Championship. The tournament was held in 2006 and 2007, both starting in the month of October.

== Results ==
=== 2006 ===
The inaugural Fight for the Right Tournament in 2006 consisted of three stages. The first stage of the tournament was a Reverse Battle Royal, with three parts. The first part had all 18 participants start outside the ring and fend off opponents in an attempt to get into the ring. When seven wrestlers have entered, other competitors are eliminated and it becomes a traditional battle royal with over-the-top-rope eliminations. When all but two are eliminated, it becomes a singles match, the winner of which advances directly to the final (third stage) of the tournament.

Stage two consists of a single-elimination tournament consisting of the six wrestlers eliminated in the second part of stage one. The pairings were determined by their order of elimination in the first stage. The first round featured singles matches and the final was a Triple Threat match. The winner of the tournament is then decided in the tournament final: a singles match between the winner of stages one and two.

The entire tournament was held on TNA Impact!. Stage 1 occurred on October 26, Round 1 of Stage 2 on November 2, and Stage 2 Final and Stage 3 on November 9.

- Stage 1 - Reverse Battle Royal
  - Winner: Abyss
  - Eliminated in one on one match: Lance Hoyt
  - Eliminated in over the top battle royal: (in order of elimination) Ron Killings, Chris Sabin, Christopher Daniels, Robert Roode, A.J. Styles
  - Eliminated in reverse battle royal: Sonjay Dutt, Jay Lethal, Eric Young, Senshi, Kazarian, Raven, Brother Runt, Brother Devon, Kip James, James Storm, Christian Cage
  - This match was named the Worst Worked Match of 2006 by Wrestling Observer Newsletter.
- Stage 2 - Single-elimination tournament

First round
Lance Hoyt
Ron Killings | Pin
A.J. Styles | Pin
Chris Sabin
Robert Roode | Pin
Christopher Daniels

Round 2
6 | Ron Killings
2 | A.J. Styles | Pin
3 | Robert Roode

- In the match between Sabin and Styles, Sabin's TNA X Division Championship was also on the line.

- Stage 3 - Tournament Final
  - Abyss defeated A.J. Styles to win the Fight for the Right Tournament
    - Abyss pinned Styles after a Black Hole Slam following an enziguiri from an interfering Chris Sabin.
    - Abyss received a title shot at Genesis.

=== 2007 ===
In 2007, the tournament was altered to have the first stage consist of 16 competitors to begin and eight to advance to the second part, where the order of elimination will determine the seedings. All eight will advance to the second stage where the winner in the final will be the winner of the tournament, thus removing the third stage.

The first stage occurred at Bound for Glory on October 14. The Quarterfinals of Stage 2 occurred on TNA Impact! on October 18 and October 25. The Semifinals occurred on November 1. The Final occurred at Genesis on November 11.

- Stage 1 - Reverse Battle Royal
  - Winner: Eric Young
  - Eliminated in one on one match: Robert Roode
  - Eliminated in battle royal: (in order of elimination) James Storm, Junior Fatu, Chris Sabin, Kaz, Lance Hoyt, Alex Shelley
  - Eliminated in reverse battle royal: B.G. James, Kip James, Jimmy Rave, Chris Harris, Petey Williams, Havok, Shark Boy, Sonjay Dutt
- Stage 2 - Single-elimination tournament

Quarterfinals
1 | Eric Young
8 | James Storm | Pin
4 | Lance Hoyt | 4:06
5 | Kaz | Pin
2 | Alex Shelley | 1:26
7 | Chris Sabin | NCO
3 | Junior Fatu | Pin
6 | Robert Roode | 15:47

Semifinals
8 | James Storm
5 | Kaz | Pin
Christian Cage | Pin
Chris Harris

Final (ladder match)
5 | Kaz
Christian Cage | Pin

  - The match between Sabin and Shelley ended in no-contest after Team 3D interfered. Neither qualified, and the opening was filled by Christian Cage by defeating Samoa Joe.
  - Chris Harris replaced Junior Fatu in the Semifinals.
  - The Final was originally held on November 8, with Cage pinning Kaz. Due to interference in the match, the original decision was thrown out and made into a ladder match at Genesis.
  - Kaz received a title shot on the November 15 edition of TNA Impact!.

== See also ==
- Total Nonstop Action Wrestling
- TNA iMPACT!
