= Motor City Machine Guns =

Professional wrestling tag team

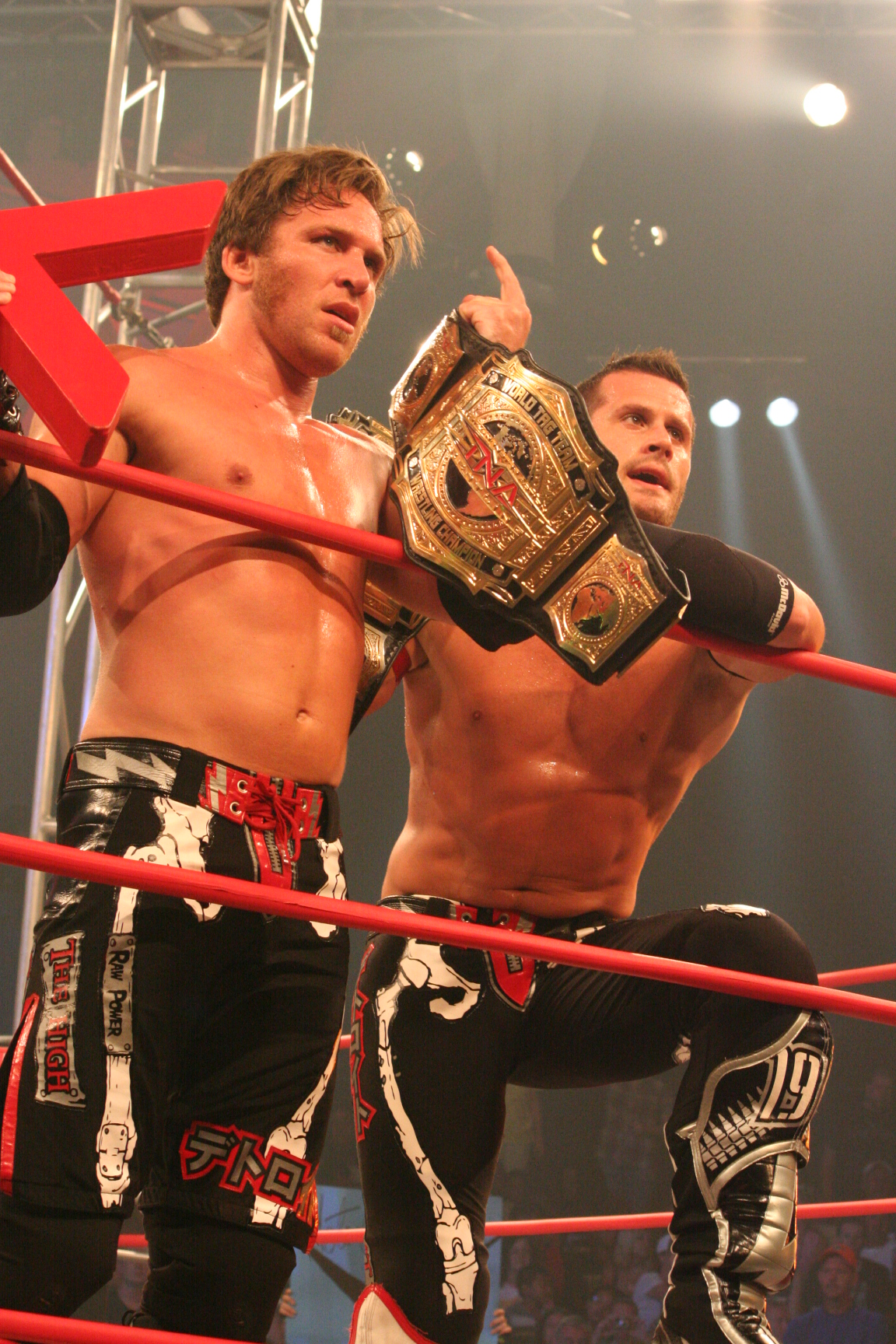
- Chris Sabin (left) and Alex Shelley (right) in July 2010 with the TNA World Tag Team Championship

Tag team
- Name(s): Alex Shelley and Chris Sabin; Motor City Machine Guns; Murder City Machine Guns
- Members: Alex Shelley; Chris Sabin
- Billed heights: Sabin: 5 ft 11 in (1.80 m); Shelley: 5 ft 10 in (1.78 m)
- Combined billed weight: 420 lb (190 kg)
- Hometown: Detroit, Michigan, U.S.
- Debut: August 25, 2006
- Years active: 2006–2012; 2016–2018; 2020–2021; 2022–present

The Motor City Machine Guns (Note: "Motor City" and "Machine Guns" have been variously written as one and two words.) are a professional wrestling tag team consisting of Alex Shelley and Chris Sabin. They are signed to All Elite Wrestling (AEW). The team name reference "Motor City", a nickname for the two's hometown of Detroit. They are the first and only team to have won championships in New Japan Pro Wrestling (NJPW), Ring of Honor (ROH), Total Nonstop Action Wrestling (TNA), and World Wrestling Entertainment (WWE).

Originally forming a team in Pro Wrestling Zero1 in 2006, Shelley and Sabin started teaming up more frequently later that year in TNA until Shelley left the company in 2012. During this first run, they won the TNA World Tag Team Championship once as well as New Japan Pro Wrestling (NJPW)'s IWGP Junior Heavyweight Tag Team Championship. The two reformed Motor City Machine Guns in 2016 in Ring of Honor, where they won the ROH World Tag Team Championship, until Shelley retired from wrestling in 2018, disbanding the team for a second time.

In 2020, the Motor City Machine Guns made their return to pro wrestling, working with several promotions including TNA, AEW, and NJPW (where they won the Strong Openweight Tag Team Championship). In 2024, they signed with WWE, where they quickly won the WWE Tag Team Championship. With this win, they became the first tag team to win championships in WWE, TNA, ROH, and NJPW. They were both released by WWE in April 2026 and returned to AEW that July.

The team also was named as the Tag Team of the Year in 2010 by both Pro Wrestling Illustrated and The Baltimore Sun.

== History ==
=== Pro Wrestling Zero1-Max (2006–2007) ===
Shelley and Sabin first started teaming in Pro Wrestling Zero1-Max in 2006, winning the Zero-1 Max International Lightweight Tag Team Championship from Minoru Fujita and Ikuto Hidaka on August 25. They held the title for almost two years before dropping them back to Fujita and his new partner Takuya Sugawara. In the United States, the pair had short runs in the independent promotions Pro Wrestling Guerrilla and Ring of Honor under the names Motor City Machine Guns and Murder City Machine Guns, respectively. The team's work for other companies eventually ended when their main employer, Total Nonstop Action Wrestling (TNA), requested their wrestlers stop taking bookings with certain independent promotions.

=== Total Nonstop Action Wrestling (2007–2012) ===
==== Debut and feud with Team 3D (2007–2008) ====
It was not until April 2007 that the team debuted in TNA, where they had previously been singles wrestlers in the company's X Division. After briefly working together while wrestling as opponents in an Xscape match at the annual Lockdown pay-per-view they became regulars in the tag team division. Initially using the Murder City name, the team's moniker was later changed to the more "PG" Motor City. After Shelley and Sabin had teamed for a few weeks in TNA, Kevin Nash—who had a history with both men and was also a Detroit native—was brought in as their manager, ending his previous alliances with Jay Lethal and Sonjay Dutt in the process, though his association with the group was short lived.

The team continued to work in independent promotions in parallel with their work in TNA, getting a run with the Illinois–based All American Wrestling's Tag Team Championship between September 2007 and January 2008. In October 2007 at Bound for Glory the team interfered in a tables match between Team 3D (Brothers Ray and Devon) and the Steiner Brothers (Scott and Rick), trying to prevent Team 3D from cheating and effectively helping the Steiners win the match. The following month at Genesis the Motor City Machine Guns surprised Team 3D and defeated them in a tag team match. Later in the event Ray and Devon, embarrassed by their loss, attacked the X Division Champion Jay Lethal and his number one contender Sonjay Dutt after their match and declared a war on the X Division as a whole, demanding that the entire X Division and all the members therein be disbanded and removed from TNA. The entire feud focused mainly upon Team 3D (including a new member in Johnny Devine, who was dubbed "Brother Devine") against the Machine Guns and Jay Lethal.

During the feud, Team 3D awarded the stolen X Division Championship to Devine, before Devine won the title outright. The two teams faced off in an Ultimate X match for the title at Final Resolution. Prior to the pay-per-view, it was claimed that Ray and Devon were too heavy to support themselves on the cables, so they "broke" Sabin and Shelley's fingers, making them unable to climb. Team 3D won this match by using a ladder to get Devon up to the title belt (which broke the "unwritten rule" of the match). At Against All Odds, Sabin, Shelley, and Lethal won a Street Fight with the existence of the X Division as a whole (excluding Devine) on the line. Sabin and Shelley were beaten off early in the match, essentially making it a handicap match of Team 3D against Lethal. As agreed in the pre–match stipulations, the win resulted in Lethal being given back the X Division title and the members of Team 3D essentially being disqualified from future matches until they could all drop their weight below super heavyweight status.

They were members of Team TNA alongside Kaz and Curry Man in the 2008 edition of the TNA World X Cup, but lost to Team Mexico at Victory Road. They then transitioned into the role of tweeners, showing disrespect to Christian Cage, A.J. Styles, Consequences Creed, B.G. James and The Latin American Xchange however still being cheered heavily by the fans and showing respect for the fans.

==== Various storylines (2008–2010) ====
On the October 30, 2008 episode of Impact!, Shelley and Sabin along with A.J. Styles, Samoa Joe, Jay Lethal, Consequences Creed, Petey Williams, Eric Young and ODB formed a faction of younger wrestlers called The TNA Front Line to oppose The Main Event Mafia.

At Turning Point, Shelley and Sabin received a shot at the TNA World Tag Team Championship, but were defeated by the champions Beer Money, Inc. (Robert Roode and James Storm), after their manager Jacqueline interfered in the match. Earlier in the evening they disrespected Mick Foley as he was addressing the TNA originals backstage. Despite this and other showings of disrespect, they remained fan favorites and a part of the team opposing the Main Event Mafia. However, they would turn heel months later attacking Lethal Consequences (Jay Lethal and Consequences Creed) after losing a tag team match to them. As part of their gimmick they were now described as "TNA Frontline members in name only". At Final Resolution, the Guns were attacked by the debuting Suicide

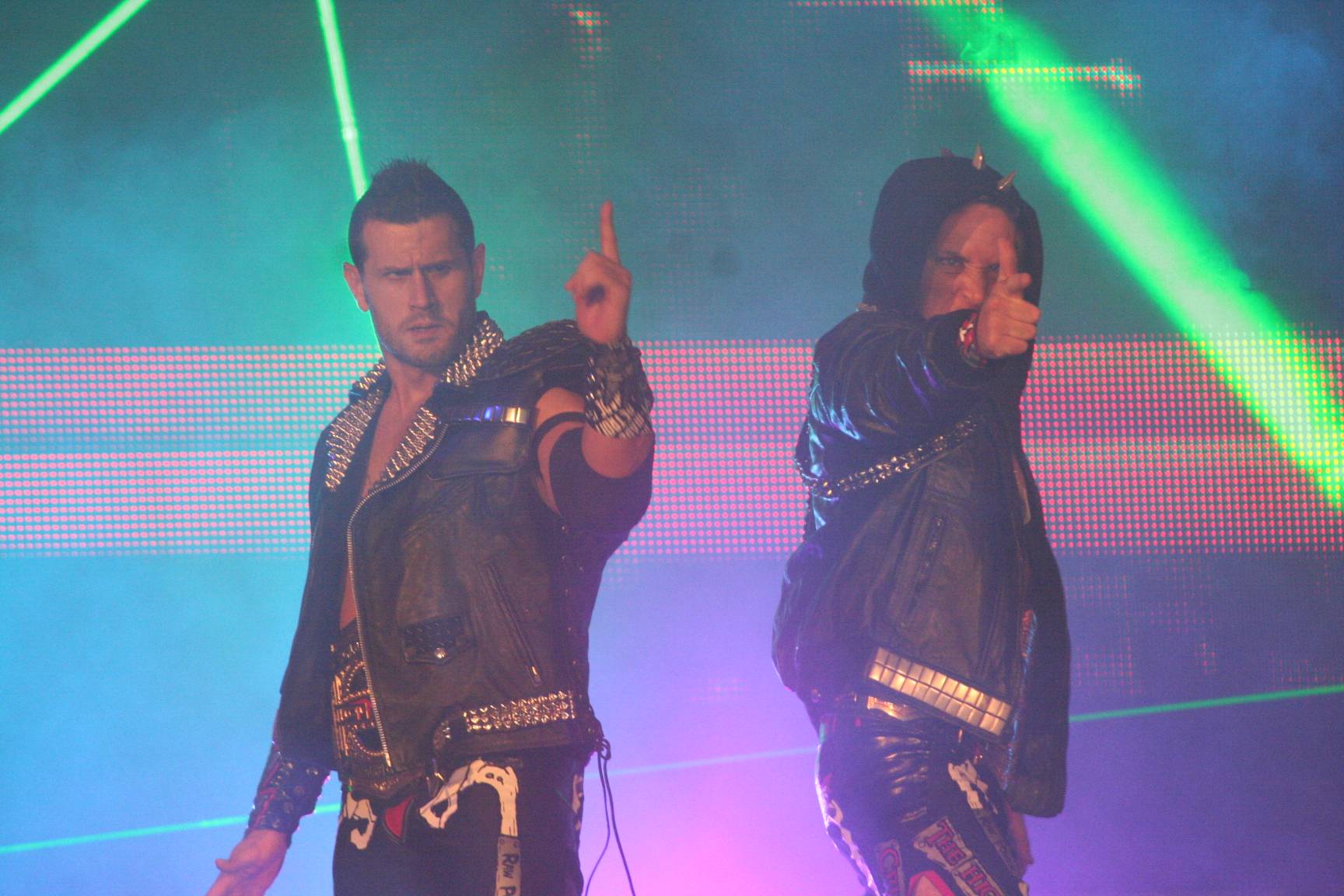
Shelley (left) and Sabin (right) in July 2010

At Genesis, Shelley defeated Sabin in the finals of a tournament to become the new TNA X Division Champion. At Destination X, Shelley lost his X Division title to Suicide in an Ultimate X match that also involved Consequences Creed, Jay Lethal and Chris Sabin. The Guns and Lethal Consequences spent the next few months unsuccessfully trying to unmask Suicide, initially also claiming that he is Daniels.

On the August 6 episode of Impact!, Shelley and Sabin both turned face once again aligning themselves with Daniels against World Elite when an all out brawl broke out in the Impact! Zone. In September Shelley and Sabin began appearing as occasional commentators alongside Mike Tenay and Taz on Impact! broadcasts. At Bound for Glory the duo won the pre–show match against Lethal Consequences, and immediately afterwards competed in the Ultimate X match for the X Division Championship which was won by champion Amazing Red. On the following episode of Impact!, they won a tag team Ultimate X match against Lethal Consequences when Sabin retrieved the X, to become #1 contenders for the TNA World Tag Team Championships and challenged the champions British Invasion (Doug Williams and Brutus Magnus) at Turning Point. On the November 12 episode of Impact! Beer Money, Inc. defeated the British Invasion in a non–title match to join the Motor City Machine Guns in the Tag Team Title match at Turning Point. At the pay-per-view The British Invasion defeated Shelley and Sabin and Beer Money, Inc. in a three–way match to retain the TNA Tag Team Championship. The following month at Final Resolution the British Invasion defeated Shelley and Sabin to once again retain their title. At Destination X the Machine Guns defeated Generation Me (Jeremy Buck and Max Buck) in an Ultimate X match to earn another shot at the TNA World Tag Team Championship. Shelley and Sabin received their title shot on the April 12 episode of Impact!, but were defeated by World Tag Team Champion Matt Morgan and Amazing Red, who replaced the injured Hernandez in the match.

==== World Tag Team Championship reign (2010–2011) ====
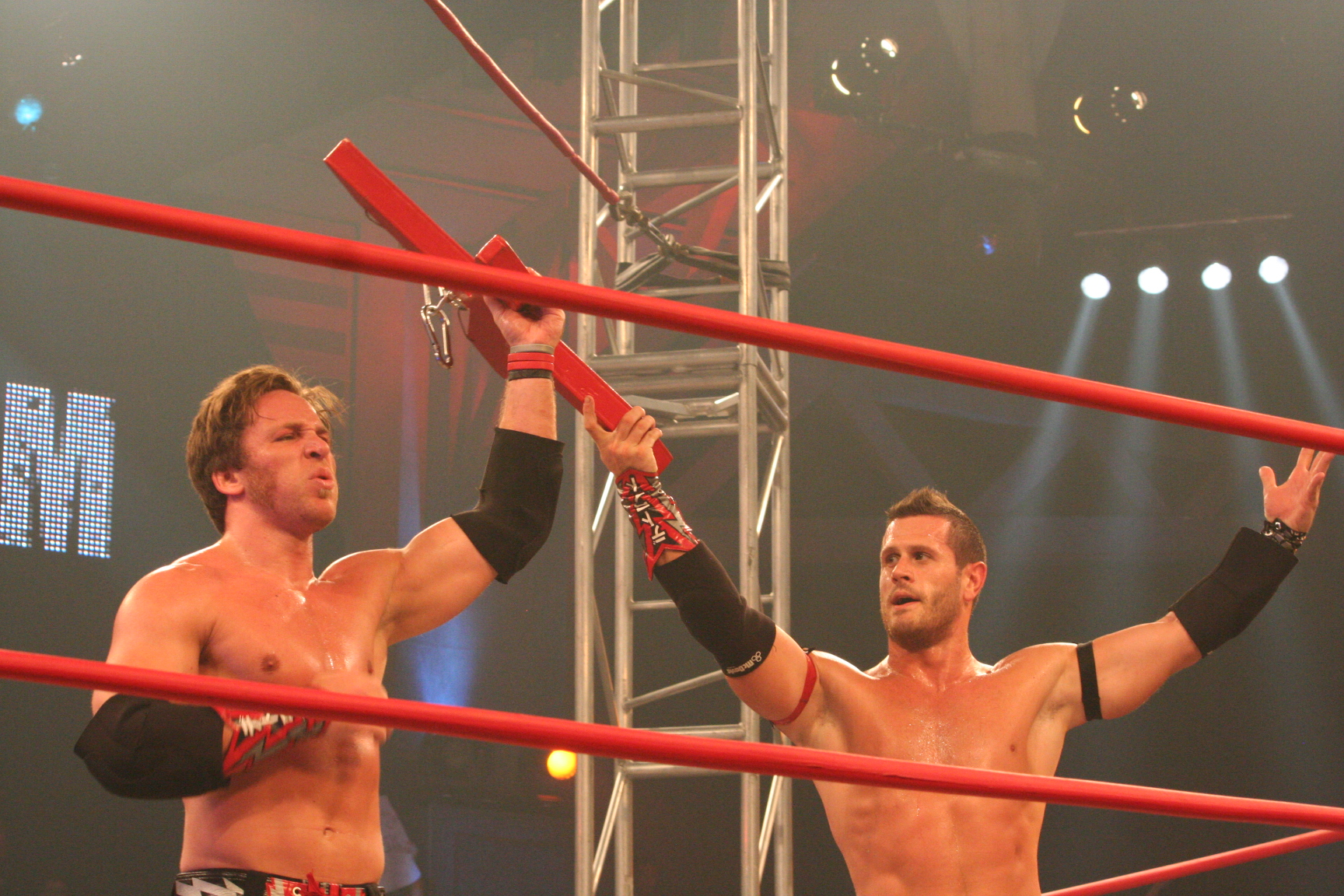
Sabin and Shelley after defeating Beer Money, Inc. in an Ultimate X match

The following month at Sacrifice the Motor City Machine Guns defeated Beer Money, Inc. and Team 3D in a three–way match to earn another shot at the Tag Team Championship. On July 11 at Victory Road the Motor City Machine Guns defeated Beer Money, Inc. to win the vacant TNA World Tag Team Championship for the first time. After Victory Road the Motor City Machine Guns entered a Best of Five Series with Beer Money, Inc., contested for the TNA World Tag Team Championship. Beer Money won the first two matches, a ladder match and a Street Fight, after knocking their opponents out with beer bottles. However, Shelley and Sabin came back to win the two following matches, a steel cage match and an Ultimate X match, to even the score to 2–2 and set up a deciding match for the August 12 episode of Impact!. On the August 12 episode of Impact! the Motor City Machine Guns defeated Beer Money, Inc. in a Two Out of Three Falls match to win the Best of Five Series and retain the TNA World Tag Team Championship. The following month at No Surrender, the Motor City Machine Guns retained their title in a match against Generation Me. After the match Generation Me turned heel by attacking the Machine Guns and injuring Shelley. On the following episode of Impact! Generation Me laid claim to the TNA World Tag Team Championship, claiming that the champions wouldn't be able to defend them for 30 days, due to Shelley's injury, before stealing Sabin's title belt. Shelley would however make his return two weeks later and promised Generation Me a rematch for the World Tag Team Championship at Bound for Glory. At the pay–per–view the Motor City Machine Guns defeated Generation Me to retain the TNA World Tag Team Championship. Also at Bound for Glory, Team 3D announced their retirement from professional wrestling, but requested one final match against the Motor City Machine Guns, whom they called the best tag team in wrestling. The Motor City Machine Guns accepted and the match took place on November 7, 2010, at Turning Point, where they defeated Team 3D to retain the TNA World Tag Team Championship. After Jeremy Buck pinned Sabin in an eight-person tag team match, where the Motor City Machine Guns teamed with Jay Lethal and Velvet Sky and Generation Me with Robbie E and Cookie, on the November 18 episode of Impact!, the Motor City Machine Guns challenged Generation Me to an Empty Arena match. The match took place later that same night on Reaction with the Motor City Machine Guns coming out victorious. On December 5 at Final Resolution the Motor City Machine Guns defeated Generation Me in a Full Metal Mayhem match to retain the World Tag Team Championship. The following month at Genesis the Motor City Machine Guns lost the TNA World Tag Team Championship to Beer Money, Inc., after Roode rolled up Sabin, following a miscommunication between the Machine Guns, ending their reign at 182 days, two days short of the longest reign in the title's history.

The Motor City Machine Guns received their rematch for the title on the January 13 episode of Impact!, but lost again due to a miscommunication. For the next three months, the Motor City Machine Guns went inactive, as Shelley suffered a collarbone injury and Sabin returned to the X Division. On the April 28 episode of Impact!, Shelley made his return, saving Sabin from a beatdown at the hands of Mexican America (Anarquia and Hernandez). Ironically, the same day Shelley made his return, Sabin suffered a knee injury in his match with Anarquia, who was out of position causing Sabin to tear both his ACL and MCL. Later that same week, Sabin underwent knee surgery, which would sideline him for the rest of the year.

==== Return (2012) ====
On March 18, 2012, at Victory Road, TNA aired a video, promoting the upcoming return of the Motor City Machine Guns. The Motor City Machine Guns returned on the April 5 episode of Impact Wrestling, defeating Mexican America in a tag team match, before announcing their intention of going for the TNA World Tag Team Championship, held by Magnus and Samoa Joe. On April 15 at Lockdown, the Motor City Machine Guns unsuccessfully challenged Magnus and Joe for the TNA World Tag Team Championship in a steel cage match. During the next month, the Motor City Machine Guns did not make another appearance on Impact Wrestling, instead wrestling exclusively on TNA house shows. On May 21, it was reported that Shelley had chosen not to renew his contract with TNA, instead leaving the promotion and disbanding the Motor City Machine Guns.

=== Ring of Honor (2007–2008) ===
On March 30, 2007, in their hometown of Detroit, Shelley and Sabin made their ROH debut as a team under the name The Murder City Machine Guns by challenging and then attacking Jay Briscoe after he and his brother Mark, who had injured himself during the match, had won back the ROH World Tag Team Championship from Naruki Doi and Shingo. On April 28 in Chicago, IL, at Good Times, Great Memories The Briscoe Brothers successfully defended their tag team title against Shelley and Sabin. After the event TNA pulled all of their wrestlers from any upcoming ROH shows.

In April 2008 Shelley and Sabin returned to Ring of Honor, losing to the Age of the Fall (Tyler Black and Jimmy Jacobs) and defeating the Briscoe Brothers on the 18th and 19th respectively.

They returned to Ring of Honor in August 2008. On August 1 in Manassas, VA they fought Austin Aries and Bryan Danielson to a 20-minute time limit draw and then a 5-minute overtime draw. The next day in New York City they were defeated by Kevin Steen and El Generico when Steen forced Sabin to submit to the Sharpshooter. The team was scheduled to return to ROH on October 24 and 25, but were pulled from the events by TNA and replaced by the Latin American Xchange.

=== New Japan Pro-Wrestling (2009–2010) ===
On January 4, 2009, Sabin and Shelley defeated No Limit (Tetsuya Naito and Yujiro) at New Japan Pro-Wrestling's Wrestle Kingdom III in Tokyo Dome to win the IWGP Junior Heavyweight Tag Team Championship. They became the second gaijin team to win the championship after American Dragon and Curry Man. After three successful title defenses, two of which took place in TNA, Shelley and Sabin lost the IWGP Junior Heavyweight Tag Team Title to Apollo 55 (Prince Devitt and Ryusuke Taguchi) on July 5, 2009, at NJPW's Circuit 2009 New Japan Soul. On November 8, 2010, NJPW announced that the Motor City Machine Guns would be returning to the promotion the following month, competing at events on December 11 and 12. On December 11, Shelley and Sabin were defeated by No Limit in their New Japan return match. The following day they defeated Apollo 55 in the fourth ever match between the two teams.

=== Return to ROH (2010, 2016–2018) ===
On February 13, 2010, Ring of Honor announced at their 8th Anniversary Show that the Motor City Machine Guns would return to the company on May 8 in New York City. On May 8, the Motor City Machine Guns were defeated by the ROH World Tag Team Champions The Kings of Wrestling (Chris Hero and Claudio Castagnoli) via disqualification, when the Briscoe Brothers interfered in the match.

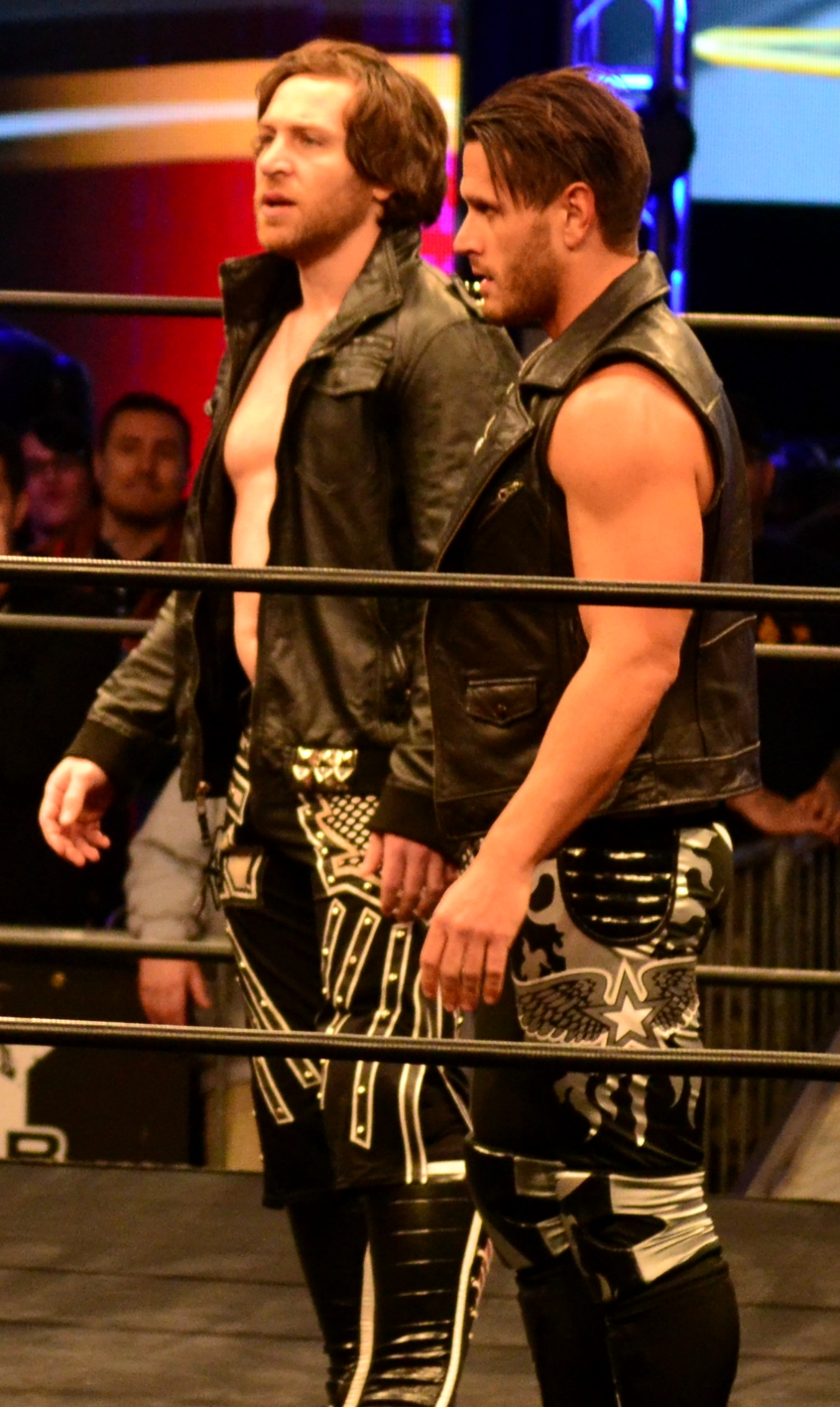
Sabin and Shelley in February 2016

On February 26, 2016, at the 14th Anniversary Show, Shelley and Sabin re-formed the Motor City Machine Guns, when the former turned on his Knights of the Rising Dawn (KRD) stablemate Christopher Daniels, helping Shelley defeat him in a singles match. At the following day's Ring of Honor Wrestling tapings, Shelley and Sabin defeated Daniels and Frankie Kazarian, The Addiction, in their return match. This led to the two unsuccessfully challenging The Addiction for the ROH World Tag Team Championship on June 24 at Best in the World '16. On September 30 at All Star Extravaganza VIII, the Motor City Machine Guns took part in a three-way ladder match for the ROH World Tag Team Championship, which was won by The Young Bucks (Matt Jackson and Nick Jackson) and also included The Addiction. Sabin and Shelley then formed a stable named "Search and Destroy" with Jay White, Jonathan Gresham and Lio Rush.

On September 22, 2017, at Death Before Dishonor XV, the Motor City Machine Guns defeated The Young Bucks to win the ROH World Tag Team Championship for the first time. They would retain the titles until March 9, 2018, when they lost them against The Briscoe Brothers at ROH 16th Anniversary Show. In June, Shelley suffered an injury. On July 20, 2018, Shelley left the promotion and retired from professional wrestling, disbanding the tag team for a second time.

=== Return to NJPW (2016) ===
On July 31, 2016, NJPW announced that the Motor City Machine Guns would be returning to the promotion on August 21. In their return match, the Motor City Machine Guns unsuccessfully challenged The Young Bucks for the IWGP Junior Heavyweight Tag Team Championship.

=== Return to Impact Wrestling / TNA Wrestling (2020–2024) ===
On July 18, 2020, at Slammiversary, the Motor City Machine Guns returned to Impact! Wrestling nearly two years after splitting and defeated The Rascalz (Zachary Wentz and Dezmond Xavier) after answering their open challenge. On the following episode of Impact!, they defeated The North to capture the Impact World Tag Team Championship for the first time in over ten years and second time overall, ending The North's record-setting 383 day reign. After retaining the titles against The North in a rematch and against The Rascalz, they would lose the titles back to the North at Bound for Glory in a Fatal Four way tag team match after Shelley was attacked before the match and Sabin was left alone to defend the championships. With Shelley out of commission for the next two months, James Storm would fill in as Sabin's partner, defeating XXXL (Acey Romero and Larry D) at Turning Point on November 14.

After Shelley returned to action on the December 1 episode of Impact!, resuming the team with another victory over XXXL, The Guns were scheduled to team up with Rich Swann to face Kenny Omega and The Good Brothers at Hard To Kill on January 16, 2021, but Shelley legitimately had to back out due to "unavoidable circumstances", later revealed in that his outside career as a physical therapist required him to step away from wrestling for the time being until he was able to get the COVID-19 vaccine. Moose would replace Shelley in the match at Hard to Kill, and Storm would be brought back to occasionally team with Sabin through the early months of 2021 as the Motor City Machine Guns quietly disbanded for a third time. Later, in September 2021, Shelley announced that he left Impact, but was open to returning at a later time.

On the March 10, 2022, episode of Impact!, the Motor City Machine Guns reunited as Sabin came out to back Shelley in his feud with their former protégé Jay White, leading to a match scheduled against White and Chris Bey on the March 17 episode. On December 9, Shelley and Sabin captured the Impact World Tag Team Championships from Heath and Rhino. On the March 2, 2023 episode of Impact, the Motor City Machine Guns lost their titles to Bullet Club members Ace Austin and Chris Bey, ending their reign at 78 days.

On the March 23, 2024 tapings for TNA Impact!, the Motor City Machine Guns wrestled their final match for the company in a losing effort against The System (Eddie Edwards and Brian Myers), as both Shelley and Sabin's contracts expired on April 1, making them free agents.

=== Second return to NJPW (2022–2023) ===
After defeating the Strong Openweight Tag Team Champions, Aussie Open on the September 15, 2022 episode of Impact!, Sabin and Shelley made their return to New Japan Pro-Wrestling at Rumble on 44th Street on October 28. At the event, the Motor City Machine Guns defeated Aussie Open to win the Strong Openweight Tag Team Championships, in a three-way match, also involving The DKC and Kevin Knight. The duo retained the titles in February at Battle in the Valley, defeating the West Coast Wrecking Crew (Royce Isaacs and Jorel Nelson). On April 15 at Capital Collision, Shelley and Sabin lost the titles back to Aussie Open in a three-way tag-team match also involving the team of Kazuchika Okada and Hiroshi Tanahashi. At Destruction In Ryōgoku, the two teamed with Josh Alexander to unsuccessfully challeng Kazuchika Okada, Hiroshi Tanahashi, and Tomohiro Ishii for the NEVER Openweight 6-Man Tag Team Championship.

=== All Elite Wrestling (2022) ===
On the August 24, 2022, episode of Dynamite, Sonjay Dutt announced that Jay Lethal would team with Shelley and Sabin at the All Out pay-per-view, where they would take on Wardlow and FTR (Cash Wheeler and Dax Harwood) in a six-man tag-team match, with the two set to make their All Elite Wrestling (AEW) debut. At the event, Wardlow and FTR would win the match, with assistance from Samoa Joe, who attacked Satnam Singh early in the match.

=== WWE (2024–2026) ===
In September 2024, it was reported that Shelley and Sabin signed with WWE. They made their debut on the SmackDown brand on October 18 in a qualifying match against A-Town Down Under (Grayson Waller and Austin Theory) and Los Garza (Angel and Berto), and won the WWE Tag Team Championship the following week on October 25 after they defeated #DIY (Johnny Gargano and Tommaso Ciampa), and then the champions, The Bloodline (Tama Tonga and Tonga Loa), in consecutive matches. On the December 6 episode of SmackDown, Shelley and Sabin lost the titles to #DIY, ending their reign at 42 days.

Shelley and Sabin attempted to regain the titles in a two-out-of-three falls match on February 1, 2025 at the Royal Rumble event, but were not successful due to interference from The Street Profits. On the April 25 episode of SmackDown, they would attempt to regain the titles in a tables, ladders, and chairs (TLC) match against #DIY and The Street Profits, where the latter won. At night two of SummerSlam on August 3, Shelley and Sabin competed in a six-pack tag team TLC match for the WWE Tag Team Championships against Fraxiom (Axiom and Nathan Frazer), The Street Profits, Andrade & Rey Fénix, #DIY, and The Wyatt Sicks (Joe Gacy and Dexter Lumis), where the latter retained their titles.

Shelley and Sabin wrestled their final match in WWE on the April 17, 2026 episode of SmackDown as they both entered the André the Giant Memorial Battle Royal, but failed to win. A week later on April 24, it was announced that both Shelley and Sabin among several others had been released by WWE, ending their two-year tenure with the company.

=== Return to AEW (2026–present) ===
Shelley and Sabin returned to AEW as signed talents during the opening of the July 30, 2026, episode of Collision, held in their hometown of Detroit. They wrestled their first match as AEW talents on the September 5 episode of Collision, defeating The Swirl (Blake Christian and Lee Johnson). In October, they began a best-of-five series against FTR (Cash Wheeler and Dax Harwood), with Shelley and Sabin winning the first match at WrestleDream on October 17. The two teams would trade victories for the second, third, and fourth matches which would tie the series at 2-2. Shelley and Sabin won the deciding match on the November 11 episode of Dynamite and became the number one contenders for the AEW World Tag Team Championship.

== Championships and accomplishments ==
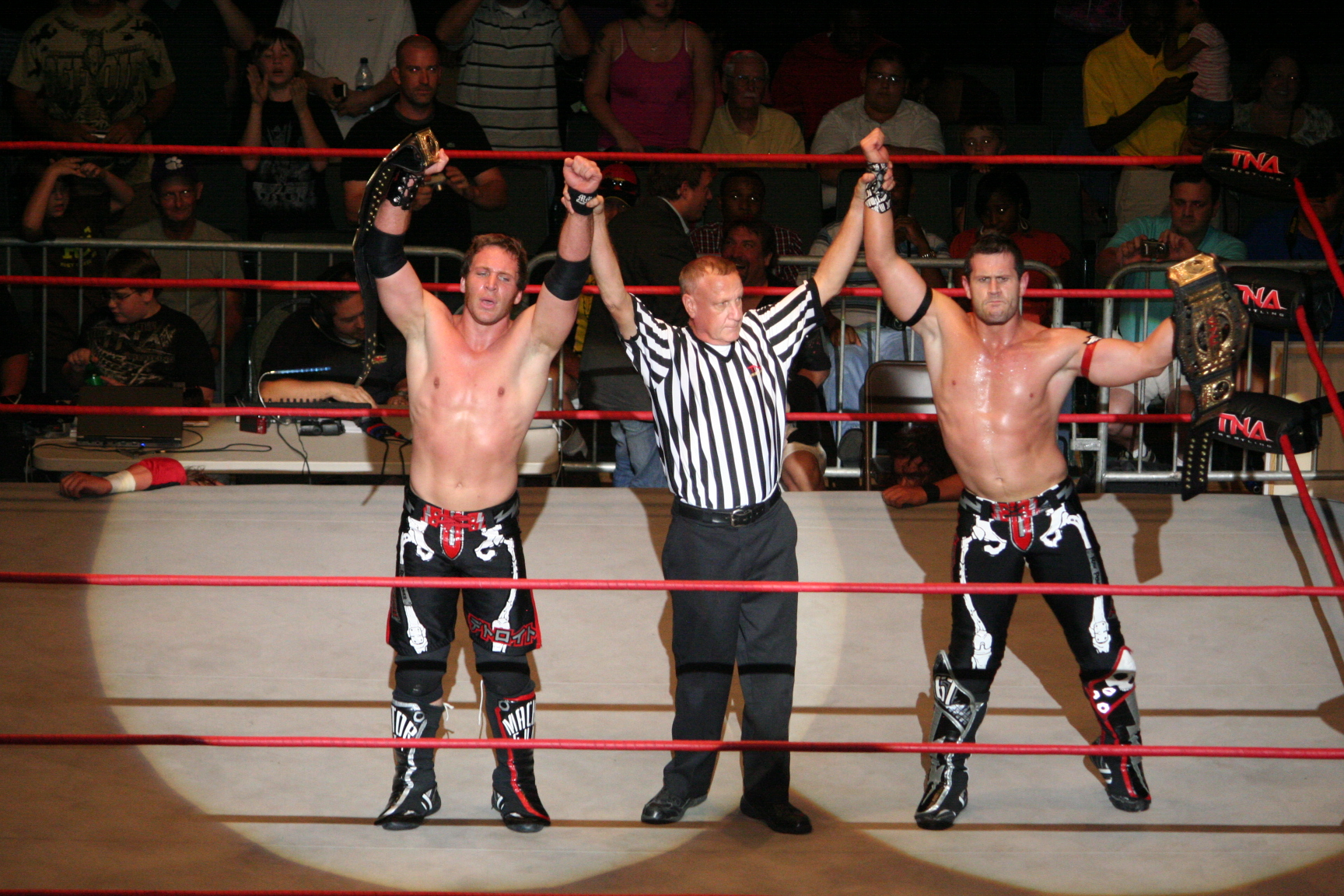
Sabin and Shelley are three-time TNA/Impact World Tag Team Champions.

- All American Wrestling
  - AAW Tag Team Championship (1 time)
- City Championship Wrestling
  - CCW Tag Team Championship (1 time)
- Deadlock Pro-Wrestling
  - DPW Worlds Tag Team Championship (1 time)
- Game Changer Wrestling
  - GCW Tag Team Championship (1 time)
- The Baltimore Sun
  - Tag Team of the Year (2010)
- New Japan Pro-Wrestling
  - IWGP Junior Heavyweight Tag Team Championship (1 time)
  - Strong Openweight Tag Team Championship (1 time)
- Pro Wrestling Illustrated
  - PWI Tag Team of the Year (2010)
  - Ranked as N5 on PWI 100 Tag Teams 2023
- Pro Wrestling Zero1-Max
  - NWA International Lightweight Tag Team Championship (1 time)
- Ring of Honor
  - ROH World Tag Team Championship (1 time)
- Total Nonstop Action Wrestling/Impact Wrestling
  - TNA/Impact World Championship (2 times) – Sabin (1) Shelley (1)
  - TNA/Impact X Division Championship (11 times) – Sabin (10) and Shelley (1)
  - Impact/TNA World Tag Team Championship (3 times)
  - Gauntlet for the Gold (2008 – Tag Team)
  - TNA / Impact Year End Awards (4 times)
    - Tag Team of the Year (2007)
    - Moment of the Year (2020) – returning to Impact at Slammiversary, shared with the other returns and debuts that night
    - Men's Tag Team of the Year (2022)
    - Male Wrestler of the Year (2023) - Shelley
- WWE
  - WWE Tag Team Championship (1 time)
  - WWE Tag Team Championship #1 Contender Tournament (2024)
  - WWE Tag Team Championship #1 Contender Tournament (2025)

== Other media ==
In 2008, Shelley and Sabin appeared in an episode of the MTV series Made, teaching a school boy the basics of professional wrestling. The two are also members of a rock band named The High Crusade, along with former TNA wrestler Petey Williams, Adam Tatro and Chris Plumb. The band released their debut album, It's Not What You Think, on September 7, 2010. They made their debuts in the WWE 2K video game franchise when they were announced to be included in the New Wave DLC pack for WWE 2K25 in May 2025.
