= Crystal Louthan =

American professional wrestling interviewer and announcer

Personal information
- Born: September 4, 1981 (age 44)

Professional wrestling career
- Ring name: Crystal Louthan
- Billed height: 5 ft 7 in (1.70 m)
- Billed from: Orlando, Florida
- Debut: 2007

Crystal Louthan (born September 4, 1981) is an American professional wrestling interviewer and announcer. She is best known for her appearances with Total Nonstop Action Wrestling.

== Early life and career ==
Louthan worked as a model once appeared as a boxing ring girl on HBO. She was crowned "Miss Jeannie 2005" in an "I Dream of Jeannie" lookalike contest. She has also worked as a broadcaster for the Orlando Magic NBA basketball team.

== Total Nonstop Action Wrestling ==
During the Fall 2007, Louthan joined Total Nonstop Action Wrestling (TNA) as a backstage interviewer, replacing previous interviewer Leticia Cline. Cline returned on the October 24, 2007 edition of TNA Impact! and was angered that she had been replaced and jealously confronted Louthan, but the kayfabed storyline was quickly dropped.

In addition to working as an interviewer on Impact! and TNA pay-per-view events, Louthan appeared on the monthly "Road To" SpikeTV specials and the Countdown Preshow prior to each pay-per-view.

Crystal took a month off working TNA's TV tapings for much of April 2008. She later returned on May 8, interviewing Kevin Nash & Samoa Joe. but she was replaced by Lauren Brooke.

== Personal life ==
Outside of work, Louthan enjoys working out, wakeboarding, fishing, dancing, traveling, golf, tennis, charity work, and extreme sports including skydiving, hang gliding, white water rafting, and zip lining.
