= No Surrender (2008) =

2008 Total Nonstop Action Wrestling pay-per-view event

- Promotional poster featuring Samoa Joe
- Promotion: Total Nonstop Action Wrestling
- Date: September 14, 2008
- City: Oshawa, Ontario
- Venue: General Motors Centre
- Attendance: 3,500

Pay-per-view chronology
← Previous; Hard Justice	Next → Bound for Glory IV

No Surrender chronology
← Previous; 2007	Next → 2009

No Surrender 2008 was a professional wrestling pay-per-view (PPV) event produced by the Total Nonstop Action Wrestling (TNA) promotion that took place on September 14, 2008 at the General Motors Centre in Oshawa, Ontario, Canada. It was the fourth event under the No Surrender name, TNA's first PPV to take place outside the United States, and the ninth event in the 2008 TNA PPV schedule. Nine professional wrestling matches were featured on the event's card, four of which were for championships.

The main event was a Three Ways to Glory match for the TNA World Heavyweight Championship with the champion Samoa Joe defending the title against Christian Cage and Kurt Angle. Joe successfully retained the title at the show. A.J. Styles defeated Frank Trigg in a Mixed Martial Arts match also on the show. The TNA World Tag Team Championship was defended by Beer Money, Inc. (James Storm and Robert Roode) against The Latin American Xchange (Hernandez and Homicide). Beer Money, Inc. retained the championship at the event. TNA held a Ladder of Love match for SoCal Val, in which Sonjay Dutt defeated Jay Lethal. The TNA X Division Championship was also defended in a Three Way match by Petey Williams against Sheik Abdul Bashir and Consequences Creed, which Bashir won to become the new champion.

No Surrender is remembered for being the first TNA PPV held outside the United States and for the return of Jeff Jarrett to TNA television. 20,000 was the reported figure of purchasers for the event by the Wrestling Observer Newsletter. No Surrender had an attendance of 3,500 people. Jason Clevett of the professional wrestling section of the Canadian Online Explorer rated the show a 3 out of 10, which was lower than the 7 out of 10 given to the 2007 edition by Chris Sokol. In regards to the overall show, Clevett said that "TNA’s pay per view debut in Canada was one of the weakest shows in recent memory, overwhelmed by horrible overbooking by TNA that once again proves that they do not know what their fanbase wants."

In October 2017, with the launch of the Global Wrestling Network, the event became available to stream on demand.

== Production ==
=== Background ===
The fourth installment under the No Surrender name was announced in January 2008 with a September 14 date attached. In July, The Wrestling Observer Newsletter reported that TNA would hold its first PPV held in Canada with No Surrender in September. The reported location for the event was Oshawa, Ontario, Canada at the General Motors Centre. TNA issued a press release in late-July revealing that No Surrender would be held at the General Motors Centre in Oshawa, Ontario on September 14. Tickets for the show went on-sale on July 25. Early ticket sales for the event were on par with the early sales of TNA's Lockdown PPV event. The General Motors Centre was close to being sold out a few days prior to the show, with only 800 tickets remaining. The arena had a maximum capacity of 5,000 but was configured to have a maximum capacity of 3,500 due to the event layout. Views were positive in TNA towards early ticket sales considering it was TNA's first PPV in Canada. Before any matches were announced, it was suspected that the event would be headlined by a tag team match or a trios bout to set up for a standard match at TNA's next PPV event Bound for Glory IV on October 12. TNA released a poster to promote the show featuring Samoa Joe, while "Soul Crusher" by Operator was the official theme.

=== Storylines ===
No Surrender featured nine professional wrestling matches that involved different wrestlers from pre-existing scripted feuds and storylines. Wrestlers portrayed villains, heroes, or less distinguishable characters in the scripted events that built tension and culminated in a wrestling match or series of matches.

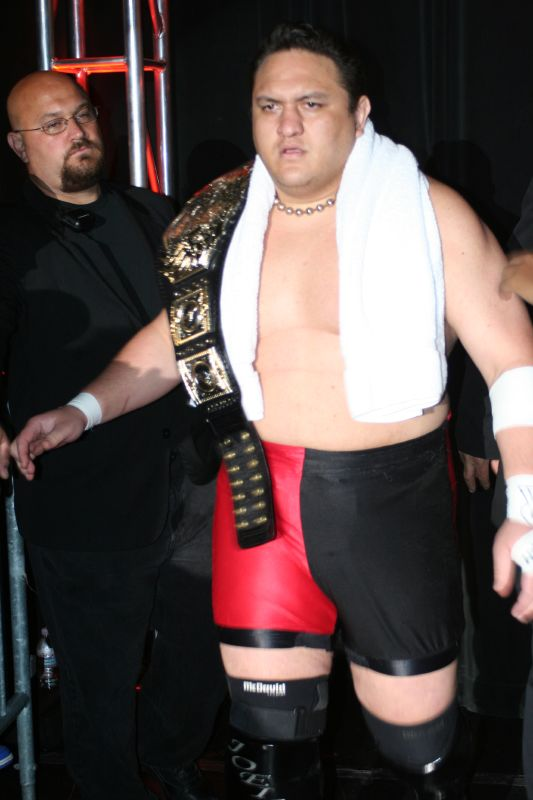
Samoa Joe (pictured) was scheduled to defend the TNA World Heavyweight Championship at No Surrender in a Four Ways to Glory match.

The main event at No Surrender was a Four Ways to Glory match for the TNA World Heavyweight Championship, in which the champion Samoa Joe defended the title against three competitors. This match was announced on the August 14 episode of TNA's television program TNA Impact!, with Management Director Jim Cornette stating that three qualification matches would take place to determine the challengers to Joe over the weeks leading to No Surrender. The first qualifying match was on the August 21 episode of Impact!, when Booker T defeated Rhino to take a spot in the match. Kurt Angle defeated Kevin Nash on the August 28 episode of Impact! to qualify for the contest. The final qualifier was Christian Cage, who defeated A.J. Styles on the September 4 episode of Impact!.

TNA held a scripted Mixed Martial Arts match at No Surrender between A.J. Styles and Frank Trigg. This match was the result of a feud between Kurt Angle and Styles. The two had competed against each other at TNA's Slammiversary PPV event on June 8, Victory Road PPV event on July 13, Hard Justice PPV event on August 10, and on several Impact! episodes with Trigg providing commentary for some of the contests and aiding Angle in the feud as they were depicted as on-screen best friends. At one point during the rivalry, Styles mistakenly attacked Trigg on the June 19 episode of Impact!. A couple of months later on the September 4 episode of Impact!, Trigg attacked Styles during his Four Ways to Glory qualifying match with Christian Cage. Trigg hit Styles with a kendo stick and left the ring, which allowed Cage to pin Styles to win the bout. On the September 11 episode of Impact!, Styles challenged Trigg to a bout at No Surrender, which Trigg agreed but only if it was contested under Mixed Martial Arts rules.

The TNA World Tag Team Championship was defended at No Surrender by Beer Money, Inc. (James Storm and Robert Roode) against The Latin American Xchange (Hernandez and Homicide; LAX). On the June 12 episode of Impact!, Roode and Storm teamed to face LAX for the World Tag Team Championship. The match was originally won by Roode and Storm before being restarted due to interference. LAX won the restart to retain the championship. After the bout, Roode and Storm assaulted LAX and their manager Héctor Guerrero. Management Director Jim Cornette scheduled a title defense at Victory Road between LAX and Roode and Storm under "Fan's Revenge" Lumberjack rules on the June 19 episode of Impact!. At Victory Road, LAX defeated the newly renamed Beer Money Incorporated to retain the World Tag Team Championship. On the July 17 episode of Impact!, Roode and Storm began assaulting various wrestlers, crew members, and fans in retaliation for their loss at Victory Road. Later in the program, Roode and Storm once again attacked Guerrero, prompting LAX to come to his rescue. On the July 31 episode of Impact!, Roode and Storm defeated the team of Christian Cage and Rhino for a World Tag Team Championship match at Hard Justice. On the August 7 episode of Impact!, the team of Cage, Rhino, and LAX fought the team of Roode, Storm, and Team 3D in an Eight Man Tag Team match, which the latter lost. After the contest, Roode and Storm slammed Homicide through a glass table, injuring his right eye in the storyline. At Hard Justice, Beer Money, Inc. defeated LAX to win the TNA World Tag Team Championship by pinning Homicide after Roode hit Homicide in his injured eye with a beer bottle. TNA scheduled a rematch between the two teams for the championship to take place at No Surrender.

Another rivalry heading into the show was between Jay Lethal and Sonjay Dutt, who were fighting over the heart of SoCal Val. The storyline behind this rivalry started on the May 15 episode of Impact!, when Lethal proposed marriage to Val in the storyline. With the two being an on-screen couple, she accepted with the planned wedding segment taking place at Slammiversary. Lethal then asked Dutt to be his bestman on the May 29 episode of Impact!, which he accepted despite him being scripted to show feelings for Val. At Slammiversary, Dutt interrupted the wedding proclaiming his love for Val in the storyline and attacked Lethal, which ended with Dutt unconscious as Jake Roberts placed a snake on top of his body. Dutt then defeated Lethal in a bout at Victory Road. Lethal won a rematch in a Black Tie Brawl and Chain match at Hard Justice over Dutt. Leading up to No Surrender, Dutt attacked Lethal after he was defeated by Sheik Abdul Bashir on the August 14 episode of Impact!. On the September 11 episode of Impact!, TNA promoted a Ladder of Love match at No Surrender with the winner becoming engaged to Val.

The TNA X Division Championship was defended by Petey Williams against Sheik Abdul Bashir and Consequences Creed in a Three Way match at the event. At Hard Justice, Bashir attacked Creed with a steal chair during his bout with Williams, which allowed Williams to force Creed's head into the mat with his signature Canadian Destroyer maneuver to retain the X Division Championship. Creed was given a rematch on the August 21 episode of Impact!, with Bashir once again interfering by attacking Creed, resulting in Creed winning by disqualification and Williams retaining the X Division Championship. This match was later advertised on the card for No Surrender.

== Event ==
The event began with Sting announcing that he would be facing the TNA World Heavyweight Champion for the title at Bound for Glory IV. TNA commentator Mike Tenay also announced that due to Hurricane Ike, Booker T could not make it to the event so the original scheduled Four Ways to Glory match was changed to a Three Ways to Glory match. This was not announced to the live audience in attendance.

=== Miscellaneous ===
No Surrender featured employees other than the wrestlers involved in the matches. Mike Tenay and Don West were the commentators for the telecast. Jeremy Borash and David Penzer were ring announcers for the event. Andrew Thomas, Earl Hebner, Rudy Charles, Mark "Slick" Johnson, and Traci Brooks participated as referees for the encounters. Lauren Thompson and Borash were used as interviewers during the event. Besides employees who appeared in a wrestling role, Raisha Saeed, Johnny Devine, Rhaka Khan, Rhino, Velvet Sky, Cute Kip, Jacqueline, Héctor Guerrero, and Jeff Jarrett all appeared on camera, either in backstage or in ringside segments.

=== Preliminary matches ===
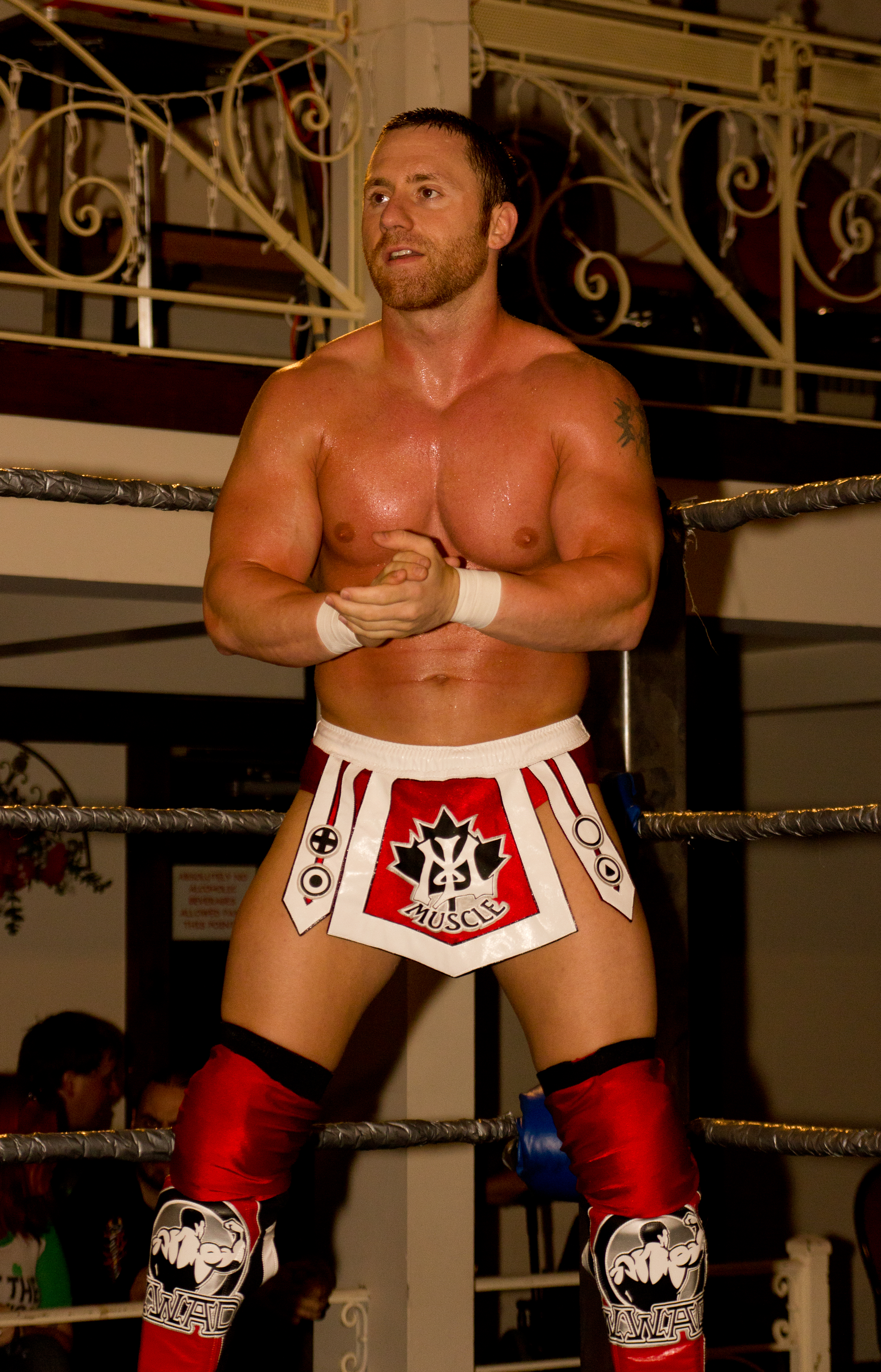
Petey Williams (pictured) defended the TNA X Division Championship at No Surrender in a Three Way match.

The opening encounter of the show was a Six Person Intergender Tag Team match pitting The Prince Justice Brotherhood (Curry Man, Shark Boy, and Super Eric) against The Rock 'n' Rave Infection (Christy Hemme, Jimmy Rave, and Lance Rock), which lasted 7 minutes and 35 seconds. The Prince Justice Brotherhood won the bout when Curry Man pinned Hemme after a Chummer performed by Shark Boy.

TNA held a Falls Count Anywhere match next between Awesome Kong and ODB. Raisha Saeed accompanied Kong to the ring. The competitors fought throughout the crowd and around the ring before Kong won the match by picking up and slamming ODB back-first through a table at 10 minutes and 23 seconds.

The team of Abyss and Matt Morgan fought Team 3D (Brother Devon and Brother Ray) in a Tag Team match at the event. The duration of the contest was 11 minutes and 33 seconds. Johnny Devine interfered in the contest on Team 3D's behalf, attacking Morgan with a steel chair before Abyss performed his signature Shock Treatment maneuver on him. Abyss won the bout for his team by slamming Devon back-first against the mat with his trademark Black Hole Slam maneuver.

The TNA X Division Championship was defended in a Three Way match by Petey Williams against Sheik Abdul Bashir and Consequences Creed next. Williams was accompanied by Rhaka Khan. The finish of the match saw Williams force Creed's head into the mat with his signature Canadian Destroyer maneuver. Bashir, who had been knocked to the ringside area, pulled Williams from the ring and threw him into the guardrail, thus preventing a pin attempt by Williams. Bashir then pinned Creed to win the TNA X Division Championship at 8 minutes and 15 seconds.

The fifth match was for the TNA Women's Knockout Championship, in which the champion Taylor Wilde defended against Angelina Love. Wilde was accompanied by Rhino to the ring, while Love was accompanied by Velvet Sky and Cute Kip. The bout lasted 6 minutes and 22 seconds. At one point in the contest, Kip attempted to interefere by aiding Love to only be met by Rhino who tackled Kip with his trademark Gore maneuver. Wilde won the bout by pinning Love following a Northern Lights suplex to retain the Women's Knockout Championship.

=== Main Event matches ===
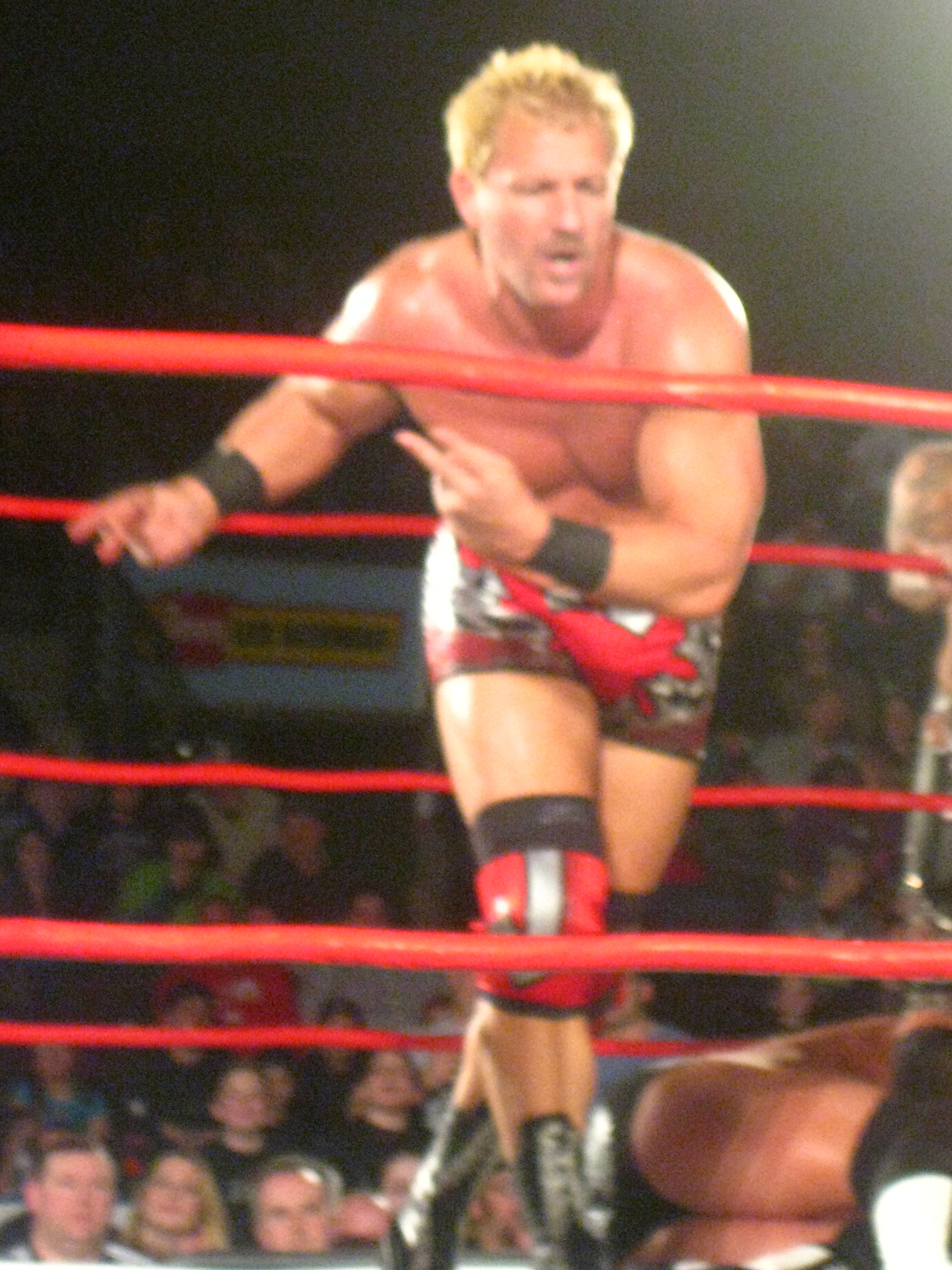
Jeff Jarrett (pictured) returned to TNA television during the main event at No Surrender.

The Ladder of Love match for SoCal Val followed between Sonjay Dutt and Jay Lethal, which lasted 13 minutes and 19 seconds. In the bout, the only way to win was to climb a ladder and retrieve an engagement ring that hung above the ring, which symbolized winning SoCal Val's heart in the storyline. Early in the match, TNA commentator Mike Tenay announced that Salinas had been injured in an assault by Jacqueline and was taken to the hospital in the storyline. The competitors set up two ladders in the ring at one point, with one standing upright and the other positioned between two steps of the first and on the top rope. This led to Dutt placing Lethal on the bridged ladder, ascending a turnbuckle, and delivered an aerial senton splash to Lethal. Later, Dutt bridged a ladder over two chairs at ringside, then followed up by forcing Lethal back-first onto the ladder with a neckbreaker. Close to the end of the encounter, Dutt had Lethal positioned on top of two standing ladders when he climbed on top of Lethal and placed Lethal in a Camel Clutch submission hold. Lethal fought out of it and pushed Dutt off the ladder, causing him to land back-first onto the ring mat. Afterwards, Lethal got his leg stuck in between the ladder rungs, causing Val to enter the ring and help release him from his predicament. Dutt then yelled at Val for helping Lethal before climbing the ladder. Lethal checked on a visibly upset Val in the storyline before also climbing the ladder. Val then hit Lethal in the groin as he climbed, allowing Dutt to retrieve the ring and win the contest.

The TNA World Tag Team Championship was defended by Beer Money, Inc. (James Storm and Robert Roode) against The Latin American Xchange (Hernandez and Homicide; LAX) in a Tag Team match afterwards. Beer Money, Inc. was accompanied by Jacqueline, while LAX was accompanied by Hector Guerrero. The duration of the contest was 8 minutes and 42 seconds. Early in the bout, Hernandez threw Homicide over the ring ropes to the outside onto a standing Storm and Roode. Later, Storm spat beer in the face of Hernandez and powerbombed him off the top of a turnbuckle to the mat below. Hernandez in return jumped over the rope to the outside onto Storm. The conclusion of the encounter saw Roode attempt to perform his signature Payoff maneuver on Homicide, only for Homicide to counter the move into his signature Gringo Stunner maneuver. Homicide then followed up by attempting to perform his trademark Da Gringo Killa maneuver, however, Jacqueline interfered in the bout throwing powder in Homicide's eyes. Roode performed the Payoff afterwards and pinned Homicide to retain the World Tag Team Championship for his team.

A Mixed Martial Arts match between A.J. Styles and Frank Trigg was the eighth contest of the show. This match lasted 6 minutes and 7 seconds. This bout was contested under mixed martial arts rules, but had a scripted finish. Half way through Round One, Styles and Trigg tumbled to the ringside area and continued to fight until security broke them up. The round ended with Styles having Trigg in an armbar submission hold, causing Styles to release the hold. The system feed broadcasting the show was interrupted at this time, upon its return it displayed a pornographic film, until the broadcast was fixed, returning to No Surrender. The feed returned to Styles and Trigg fighting in Round Two, with Styles grabbing a kendo stick from under the ring and assaulting Trigg with it. It was later shown that the bout was ruled a no contest by the referee due to Styles hitting Trigg in the groin by accident.

The main event was a Three Ways to Glory match for the TNA World Heavyweight Championship, in which the champion Samoa Joe defended against Christian Cage and Kurt Angle. Mid-way through the encounter, Angle held Joe in his signature Ankle lock submission hold when Cage tried to break up the hold, only to have Angle place Cage in the hold as well, resulting in Angle having both Joe and Cage in the Ankle Lock simultaneously. Both Cage and Joe broke out of the submission, tossing Angle to the outside area. Later, Joe attempted to perform his signature Muscle Buster maneuver on Angle, with Angle countering the move into his signature Olympic slam maneuver. Cage followed by hitting a frog splash aerial maneuver from the top of a turnbuckle onto Joe. He threw Angle from the ring, performed his signature Unprettier maneuver on Joe, and covered Joe for a pin attempt. Angle pulled the referee Earl Hebner from the ring and threw him into a ringside barricade. Angle grabbed a chair and attacked Cage and Joe with it. He knocked out Cage first then placed Joe in the Ankle lock. Jeff Jarrett then returned to TNA television by smashing a guitar over the head of Angle. Joe performed the Muscle Buster on Angle and followed by pinning Angle as the referee returned to the ring at 15 minutes and 27 seconds to retain the TNA World Heavyweight Championship.

== Reception ==
A total of 3,500 people attended No Surrender, while The Wrestling Observer Newsletter reported that 20,000 people bought the event. The show was reviewed by two contributors of the Canadian Online Explorer's SLAM! Sports, Jason Clevett and Kenai Andrews, with Andrews providing a live attendance review. Clevett rated the entire event a 3 out of 10, which was lower than the 7 out of 10 given to the 2007 edition by Chris Sokol. 7 out of 10 was also given to the 2009 edition by Bob Kapur. Bound for Glory IV also received a 7 out of 10 by Chris Sokol and Bryan Sokol. Compared to rival World Wrestling Entertainment's (WWE) Unforgiven PPV event on September 7, Unforgiven performed better as it received a 7 out of 10 from Matt Bishop. Clevett also rated the matches out of 10, with his highest rating going to the Ladder of Love match, which he gave an 8 out of 10. The main event received a 6 out of 10, the Mixed Martial Arts bout was given a 0 out of 10, the X Division Championship match got a 7 out of 10, while the World Tag Team match received a 5 out of 10.

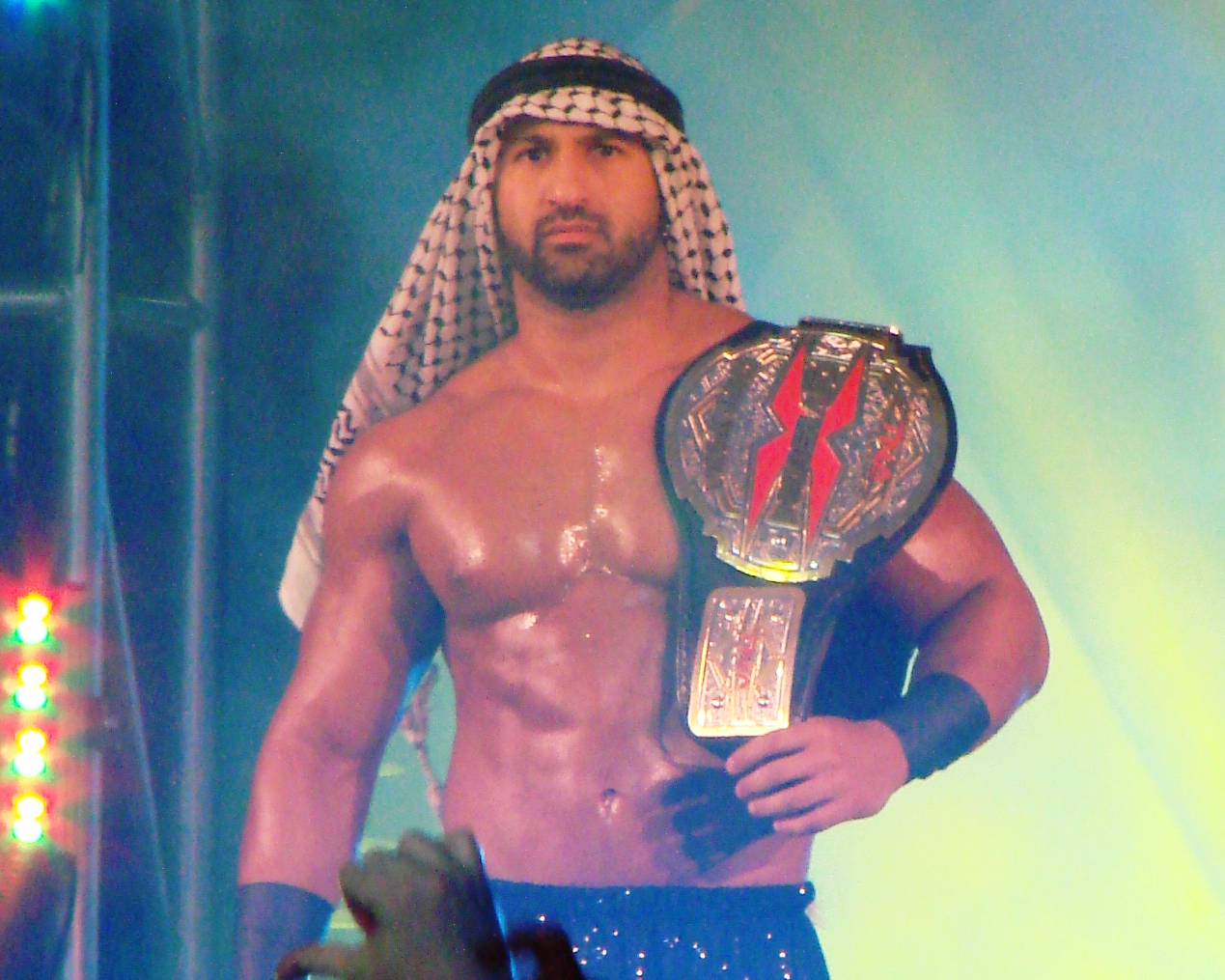
Shiek Abdul Bashir's (pictured) entrance at No Surrender received criticism in reviews of the event.

Overall, Clevett was disappointed by the event, making several comments regarding the quality of the show. In his closing comments, Clevett wrote that he "once considered himself a huge wrestling fan" but shows "like tonight make him question his dedication anymore," before revealing that he wanted "his money and three hours back." When discussing the A.J. Styles versus Frank Trigg encounter, Clevett stated that "the chant “this is b.s.” should never, ever be heard during an A.J. Styles match, the man is far too talented to ever have fans react in such a manner. However, that is exactly what the crowd at GM Place in Oshawa, Ontario, chanted during his “MMA” bout with Frank Trigg. TNA’s pay per view debut in Canada was one of the weakest shows in recent memory, overwhelmed by horrible overbooking by TNA that once again proves that they do not know what their fanbase wants." For the X Division Championship contest, Clevett discussed various issues such as Bashir's entrance music and the match quality: "I watched this show with a friend who moved here from the U.S., and we shared our disgust with Bashir’s theme music opening with the sound of a plane crashing. TNA has probably lost a few viewers at that lame attempt to garner heat." However, he felt the match was a "highlight of the show with some fast paced-solid wrestling" but that it lost a rating point for the "lousy finish." He also believed the Ladder of Love match was another "highlight of the show" despite the "terrible angle that has surrounded the feud between the two over SoCal Val." He said the two competitors "busted their asses" but that the match "should have been showcased in New Jersey last month in front of Lethal’s hometown crowd" at the Hard Justice PPV event. However, he gave credit to the two involved for "coming up with some incredibly creative spots" that got the crowd to cheer and chant "This is awesome" despite the ladder match genre having "become rather tired and overdone." Regarding the World Tag Team match, Clevett thought it "should have been held off a month" since "it really doesn’t mean much so soon after the title change." However, he felt the "four men worked hard and it was a decent tag match, but by this point the show wasn’t salvageable." As for the main event, he commented that the "match itself was solid, but felt like all three men were going through the motions" since the "three have wrestled each other so many times in the past year, it doesn’t feel fresh or exciting." He also said he could not "remember many specifics of the match, and considering the talent level that is surprising." He also expressed his disappointment in the finish, that he tried to remember "the last time a TNA main event ended without some kind of interference, guitar shot, or overbooking" but he could not.

Andrews discussed the experience of witnessing the show live along with the crowd reaction during his review. He did not give any event or match ratings, but did provide comments on the quality of the event. Andrews mentioned that the TNA President Dixie Carter was present "earnestly signed autographs" and interacting "with fans in the pre-amble" which he said they "seemed to love mingling with her and her eyes beamed when told SLAM! Wrestling was present covering the show." He stated the "crowd anticipation was decent, with many fans looking forward to "Four ways to Glory," but wondering if Booker T would show, due to Hurricane Ike making landfall in Houston, Texas, Booker's hometown" with no announcement being "made to the arena crowd about Booker T being there one way or another." Also that the "energy through most of the show had an ordinary quality, bobbing unevenly between good and bland. Sting’s opening promo were greeted warmly and Curry Man’s comical segments with Christy Hemme tickled the crowd. They also gushed over Petey Williams and his Maple Leaf Muscle, The Beautful[sic] People and Taylor Wilde, and the Jay Lethal versus Sonjay Dutt ladder match." Andrews said "the crowd came alive and actively participated throughout" those matches with the energy level being "high." Conversely, he stated that "ODB and Kong’s match was a slow-paced affair, and Beer Money Inc. - LAX tag team title match was notable only for James Storm and Jacqueline's coherent performances given their injuries at the TNA London house show the night before." The Mixed Martial Arts bout "annoyed the action-hungry fans, not wanting to endure the chess style patience that MMA can be known for. It was probably a harsh reaction, as the extremely small vocal minority thought the MMA choreography was well done, mimicking a good blend of both men trying to impose their style on the other. Ultimately, that opinion was squashed, symbolized by Styles beating Trigg with a kendo stick after the match." He felt that Booker T's absence "seemed to dampen any mystique "Four ways to Glory" had going for it" with the main event being "lacklustre[sic]" despite Christian Cage’s entrance maintaining the "aura of the grand spectacle everyone was hoping the match would be." He said it still a "solid match put on by the combatants, but one that was very familiar, prompting one fan to coin the bout "3 the Hard Way." Even Jeff Jarrett’s run-in couldn’t get a notable rise out of the crowd. Not bad and not great." However, he stated that it was "hard to ignore the grumblings about the main event in the tunnels and down Athol St." He concluded his review by writing that the "card from a ringside experience perspective was hurt by the ordinary main event, turning a possibly good and memorable show into an average one."

Wade Keller of the Pro Wrestling Torch Newsletter rated the matches out of five stars in his review of the show. For the main event, Keller gave it 3 1/4 stars and said it was a "good match" and that the "booking made sense within TNA's style, but it's yet another example of a match ending only after obvious outside interference." As for the Styles versus Trigg bout, Keller did not give it a rating and did not comment on the quality of the match, instead focused on the feed interruption, stating that the "brief image of the naked women will be talked about for years as one of the funniest blunders on pro wrestling PPV, and not so funny for parents watching with their kids." He gave the World Tag Team Championship match 1 1/4 stars calling it a "basic match" with "nothing wrong with it" despite the highpoints being late "it felt like a match to cool down the crowd after the ladder match" with another finish that conditioned "viewers to never consider a pinfall attempt a serious potential finish until there's some sort of interference - such as powder from Jackie this time." The Ladder of Love match was given 3 3/4 stars with Keller saying it was a "really good ladder match" with the competitors managing to "really innovate and not rely on the standard ladder spots we've seen so often before" but that the finish "made no sense that Val would save Lethal seconds before turning on him. It's one of those things that's done for drama that doesn't seem the least bit realistic." Lastly, Keller discussed the X Division Championship match, which he gave 2 1/2 stars and also commented on Bashir's entrance music calling it "among the most scummy promoting tactics in history" believing it was "beyond words how absolutely disgusting it is." Also saying that it is "the type of thing that should put a risk their deals with Spike TV and InDemand, it's that bad. Coming three days after the anniversary makes it worse, but it really isn't acceptable on any day."

== Aftermath ==
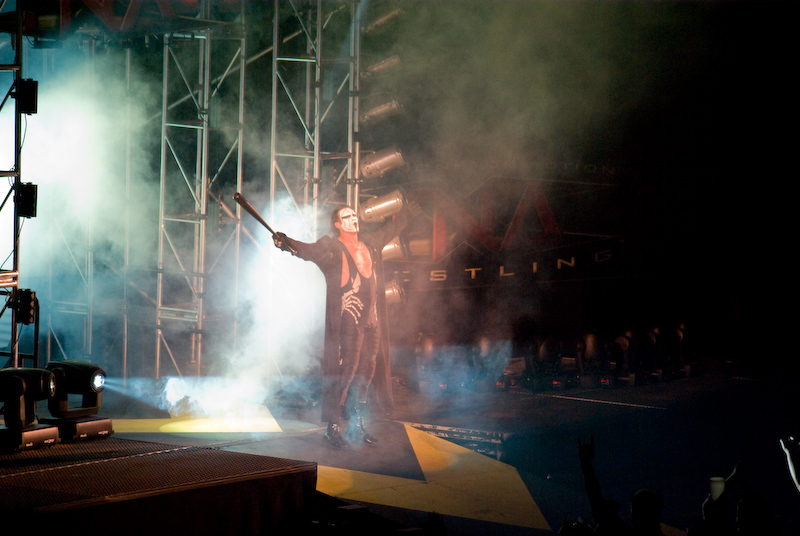
Sting went on to win the TNA World Heavyweight Championship at Bound for Glory IV

Since Sting announced that he would challenge for the TNA World Heavyweight Championship at Bound for Glory IV and Samoa Joe retained the championship at No Surrender, TNA scheduled the two to fight for the title. This feud was connected to the company wide narrative involving the rivalry between wrestling veterans and the next generation of wrestlers. Also connected to that narrative was the feud between Jeff Jarrett and Kurt Angle. Jarrett and Angle became involved after Jarrett accused the veterans in the company of trying to keep the next generation from being stars and refusing to retire. Angle challenged Jarrett to a match at Bound for Glory IV for these comments and for Jarrett assaulting him with a guitar at No Surrender. Jarrett refused at first but later accepted the challenge on the September 25 episode of Impact!. Mick Foley was announced as the Special Ringside Enforcer for the Jarrett versus Angle bout on the October 2 Impact! episode. Meanwhile, Sting and Joe signed the contract for their encounter on the October 9 episode of Impact!, with the stipulation added that there would be no rematch between the two after the event. Sting went on to win the title at the show, while Jarrett defeated Angle.

A.J. Styles, Booker T, and Christian Cage all went on to feud heading into Bound for Glory IV. This bout was also connected to the above narrative, with Cage being neutral in the storyline and both camps trying to recruit him to their group. After various miscommunications in matches involving the three wrestlers, Management Director Jim Cornette announced Booker T versus Styles with Cage as Special Guest Referee as the main event of the October 9 episode of Impact! to settle the issue. Styles defeated Booker T during the show, with Cage assaulting both wrestlers after the contest. Cornette then promoted a Three Way match between the three at Bound for Glory. Booker T won the contest at the event.

The TNA World Tag Team Championship went on to be defended in a Four Way Tag Team Monster's Ball match by Beer Money, Inc. (James Storm and Robert Roode) against the team of Abyss and Matt Morgan, The Latin American Xchange (Hernandez and Homicide; LAX), and Team 3D (Brother Devon and Brother Ray). On the September 18 episode of Impact!, Matt Morgan announced that TNA were holding a Tag Team Invitational Tournament at Bound for Glory and that he had signed up himself and his partner Abyss for the contest. Team 3D interrupted Morgan and revealed that they were also involved in the tournament. On the same telecast, Beer Money, Inc. and Jacqueline assaulted Héctor Guerrero. On the September 25 episode of Impact!, Team 3D announced that the match between them and the team of Morgan and Abyss was made a Monster's Ball match. On the same telecast, Beer Money, Inc. defeated LAX in a bout with the stipulation that the losing team lost their manager. This meant that Guerrero could no longer manage LAX in the storyline. On the October 2 episode of Impact!, Management Director Jim Cornette announced that the originally scheduled tournament was cancelled. Instead, TNA was holding a Four Way Tag Team Monster's Ball match for the TNA World Tag Team Championship between the above teams at Bound for Glory IV. TNA issued a press release announcing that Steve McMichael would be the Special Guest Referee for this match after it was promoted for the event. Beer Money, Inc. retained the championship during the telecast.

The TNA X Division Championship was defended by Sheik Abdul Bashir against Consequences Creed at Bound for Glory IV. On the October 9 episode of Impact!, Creed won a Four Way match to challenge Bashir for the title at Bound for Glory, defeating Sonjay Dutt, Williams, and Jay Lethal in the process. Bashir retained the title at the event. During the No Surrender telecast, the commentators Mike Tenay and Don West announced that LAX's manager Salinas had been attacked backstage and was sent to the hospital. In reality, Salinas had quit the company and decided against appearing at No Surrender.

== Results ==
No.	Results	Stipulations	Times
1	The Prince Justice Brotherhood (Curry Man, Shark Boy, and Super Eric) defeated The Rock 'n' Rave Infection (Christy Hemme, Jimmy Rave and Lance Rock)	Six-person intergender tag team match	7:35
2	Awesome Kong (with Raisha Saeed) defeated ODB	Falls Count Anywhere match	10:23
3	Abyss and Matt Morgan defeated Team 3D (Brother Devon and Brother Ray)	Tag team match	11:33
4	Sheik Abdul Bashir defeated Petey Williams (c) (with Rhaka Khan) and Consequences Creed	Three-way match for the TNA X Division Championship	8:15
5	Taylor Wilde (c) (with Rhino) defeated Angelina Love (with Cute Kip and Velvet Sky)	Singles match for the TNA Women's Knockout Championship	6:22
6	Sonjay Dutt defeated Jay Lethal	Ladder of Love match for SoCal Val	13:19
7	Beer Money, Inc. (James Storm and Robert Roode) (c) (with Jacqueline) defeated The Latin American Xchange (Hernandez and Homicide) (with Héctor Guerrero)	Tag team match for the TNA World Tag Team Championship	8:42
8	A.J. Styles vs. Frank Trigg ended in a no contest	Mixed Martial Arts match	6:07
9	Samoa Joe (c) defeated Christian Cage and Kurt Angle	Three-way match for the TNA World Heavyweight Championship	15:27
(c) / – the champion(s) heading into the match

== See also ==
- 2008 in professional wrestling
