= No Surrender (2007) =

2007 Total Nonstop Action Wrestling pay-per-view event

- DVD cover featuring various TNA wrestlers
- Promotion: Total Nonstop Action Wrestling
- Date: September 9, 2007
- City: Orlando, Florida
- Venue: TNA Impact! Zone
- Attendance: 900
- Tagline: Where The Nightmare Becomes A Reality

Pay-per-view chronology
← Previous; Hard Justice	Next → Bound for Glory

No Surrender chronology
← Previous; 2006	Next → 2008

The 2007 No Surrender was a professional wrestling pay-per-view (PPV) event produced by Total Nonstop Action Wrestling (TNA), which took place on September 9, 2007 at the TNA Impact! Zone in Orlando, Florida. It was the third event under the No Surrender chronology.

Eight matches were contested at the event. In the main event, Kurt Angle defeated Abyss to retain the TNA World Heavyweight Championship. In other prominent matches, Christian Cage defeated Samoa Joe by disqualification, Jay Lethal defeated Kurt Angle to win the TNA X Division Championship, Rhino defeated James Storm and, in the opening contest, Team Pacman (Adam "Pacman" Jones and Ron Killings) defeated Kurt Angle and Sting to win the TNA World Tag Team Championship.

== Storylines ==
The event featured professional wrestling matches that involve different wrestlers from pre-existing scripted feuds and storylines. Professional wrestlers portray villains, heroes, or less distinguishable characters in the scripted events that build tension and culminate in a wrestling match or series of matches.

== Event ==
Other on-screen personnel
Role:	Name:
Commentator	Mike Tenay
Commentator	Don West
Interviewer	Jeremy Borash
Ring announcer	Jeremy Borash
Ring announcer	David Penzer
Referee	Earl Hebner
Referee	Rudy Charles
Referee	Mark Johnson
Referee	Andrew Thomas

The opening match of the pay-per-view saw the champions Kurt Angle and Sting defend their TNA World Tag Team Championship against Team Pacman (Adam "Pacman" Jones and Ron Killings). Team Pacman won the match and the championship when Jones pinned Sting after an Olympic Slam from Angle.

The second match saw Rhino defeat James Storm. Rhino picked up the victory when he pinned Storm after a Gore through a table. After the match, Rhino hit Jackie Moore, who came to the ring with Storm, with a Gore.

The next match saw Robert Roode defeat Kaz, when Roode pinned Kaz after The Payoff.

The TNA X Division Championship match was next. The match saw Kurt Angle in his second match of the evening, defending his title. Jay Lethal picked up the victory when Lethal pinned Angle by reversing an ankle lock into a roll-up.

The following match was a No Disqualification match between Chris Harris and Black Reign. Harris won after he pinned Black Reign with an inside cradle.

The next match was a ten-team tag team gauntlet match to earn a TNA World Tag Team Championship match at Bound for Glory. A.J. Styles and Tomko won when Styles pinned Sabin with a roll-up. The other teams in the match were The Voodoo Kin Mafia (B.G. James and Kip James), Latin American Xchange (Hernandez and Homicide), Team 3D (Brother Ray and Brother Devon), The Motor City Machine Guns (Alex Shelley and Chris Sabin), Triple X (Christopher Daniels and Senshi), Sonjay Dutt and Petey Williams, Serotonin (Raven and Havok), Eric Young and Shark Boy and Rock 'n Rave Infection (Lance Hoyt and Jimmy Rave)

In the second to last match Christian Cage defeated Samoa Joe by disqualification. Joe was disqualified after attacking the referee when he tried to break up a hold. After the match, Joe continued to attack referees, security and X Division jobbers.

In the main event Kurt Angle defeated Abyss to retain the TNA World Heavyweight Championship, in Angle's third match of the evening. Angle targeted Abyss's left leg heavily during the match, eventually forcing him to submit to the ankle lock. After the match, Judas Mesias cut a hole under the ring mat and pulled Abyss underneath.

== Results ==
No.	Results	Stipulations	Times
1	Team Pacman (Adam Jones and Ron Killings) defeated Kurt Angle and Sting (c)	Tag team match for the TNA World Tag Team Championship	5:30
2	Rhino defeated James Storm (with Jackie Moore)	Singles match	13:20
3	Robert Roode (with Ms. Brooks) defeated Kaz	Singles match	13:50
4	Jay Lethal defeated Kurt Angle (c)	Singles match for the TNA X Division Championship	12:30
5	Chris Harris defeated Black Reign	No Disqualification match	5:30
6	A.J. Styles and Tomko defeated The Motor City Machine Guns (Alex Shelley and Chris Sabin)	Tag Team Gauntlet for the Gold match to determine #1 contenders to the TNA World Tag Team Championship at Bound for Glory	25:50
7	Christian Cage defeated Samoa Joe by disqualification	Singles match	15:15
8	Kurt Angle (c) defeated Abyss by submission	Singles match for the TNA World Heavyweight Championship	19:30
(c) / – the champion(s) heading into the match

1. The other teams were The Voodoo Kin Mafia (B.G. James and Kip James), Latin American Xchange (Hernandez and Homicide), Team 3D (Brother Ray and Brother Devon), Triple X (Christopher Daniels and Elix Skipper), Sonjay Dutt and Petey Williams, Serotonin (Raven and Havok), Eric Young and Shark Boy and Rock 'n Rave Infection (Lance Hoyt and Jimmy Rave)

== See also ==
- 2007 in professional wrestling
