= Bound for Glory IV =

2008 Total Nonstop Action Wrestling pay-per-view event

- Promotional poster featuring (left to right) Karen Angle, Samoa Joe, Booker T, Kurt Angle, Christian Cage, and Gail Kim
- Promotion: Total Nonstop Action Wrestling (TNA)
- Date: October 12, 2008
- City: Hoffman Estates, Illinois
- Venue: Sears Centre
- Attendance: 5,000—5,500

Pay-per-view chronology
← Previous; No Surrender	Next → Turning Point

Bound for Glory chronology
← Previous; 2007	Next → 2009

Bound for Glory IV was a professional wrestling pay-per-view (PPV) event produced by the Total Nonstop Action Wrestling (TNA) promotion that took place on October 12, 2008 at the Sears Centre in Hoffman Estates, Illinois. It was the fourth event under the Bound for Glory name and the tenth event in the 2008 TNA PPV schedule. This was also the final TNA PPV to be broadcast in 4:3 (480p standard definition) format, as following the October 23, 2008 edition of Impact!, all TNA programming began broadcasting in the 1080i high definition format.

The show was promoted as TNA's premier PPV event and their equivalent to the rival World Wrestling Entertainment's (WWE) WrestleMania. Eight professional wrestling matches and one untelevised match were featured on the event's card, four of which were for championships.

In the main event, Sting defeated Samoa Joe to become the new TNA World Heavyweight Champion. In other prominent matches, Jeff Jarrett defeated Kurt Angle, Booker T defeated AJ Styles and Christian Cage in a Three Way War, Beer Money, Inc. (James Storm and Bobby Roode) defeated The Latin American Xchange (Hernandez and Homicide), Abyss and Matt Morgan, and Team 3D (Brother Devon and Brother Ray) to retain the TNA World Tag Team Championship, and in the opening contest, Jay Lethal defeated Alex Shelley, Chris Sabin, Curry Man, Jimmy Rave, Johnny Devine, Petey Williams, Shark Boy, Sonjay Dutt and Super Eric in a Steel Asylum to determine the #1 contender to the Impact X Division Championship.

In October 2017, with the launch of the Global Wrestling Network, the event became available to stream on demand.

== Production ==
=== Background ===
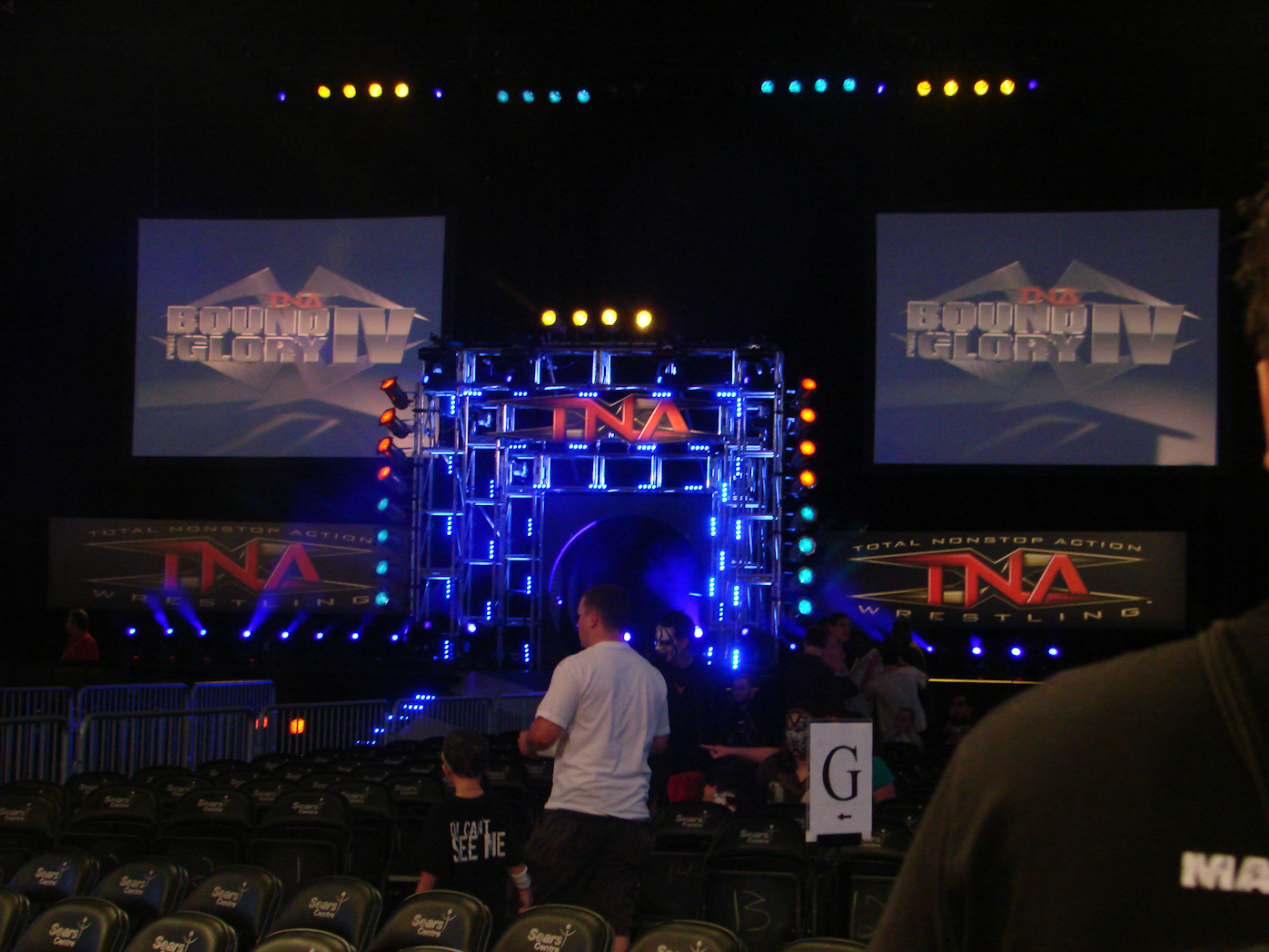
The set used for the Bound for Glory IV event

The fourth installment under the Bound for Glory name was announced in January 2008 with an October 12 date attached. TNA issued a mobile alert in March 2008 that the top three candidate cities to host the event were New York City, Toronto, and Chicago. TNA President Dixie Carter was quoted as saying that Chicago had been chosen as the location. The main event was planned to be Samoa Joe versus Kevin Nash before TNA management chose to go in a different direction. TNA issued a press release on June 9 regarding Bound for Glory, announcing it would be held at the Sears Centre in Hoffman Estates, Illinois, a suburb of Chicago. It was also revealed that the event was officially stylized as "Bound for Glory IV", tickets went on sale August 1, and TNA had scheduled a "Total Nonstop InterAction" event on October 11. Early returns for ticket sales revealed that the first two tiers had been sold out. In previous installments, the purchasing price of the event was $29.99, but with Bound for Glory IV TNA increased the price to $34.99. TNA advertised recently signed wrestler Mick Foley for their Total Nonstop InterAction event held at the Hyatt Regency in Rosemont, Illinois, with it selling out shortly afterwards. The Wrestling Observer Newsletter reported that TNA had received the largest crowd for a Total Nonstop InterAction event up to that point. TNA originally planned to use former professional football player and professional wrestler Steve McMichael as a Special Ringside Enforcer before management changed their minds and decided to use Mick Foley in the role instead. TNA later issued a press release announcing that McMichael would take part in the Bound for Glory IV festivities as a Special Guest Referee due to his fame and connection to the Chicago Bears and Chicago in general.

Bound for Glory is considered by TNA to be their equivalent to the National Football League's Super Bowl or rival World Wrestling Entertainment's WrestleMania event. As such, TNA used an extensive marketing campaign that involved several wrestlers dressing up as gangsters from the 1920s and 1930s era of Chicago to promote the show since it is the biggest event the company holds annually. Samoa Joe and The Latin American Xchange (Hernandez and Homicide) participated in some of these promotional video shoots. This was the first Bound for Glory event to use roman numerals in the title. TNA created a section on their company website to promote Bound for Glory IV. TNA released a poster to promote the show featuring Karen Angle, Joe, Booker T, Kurt Angle, Christian Cage, and Gail Kim. The official theme for the show was Tarantula by The Smashing Pumpkins. A contest was held to win upgraded ringside seats, free merchandise, and meet several TNA performers at Bound for Glory IV by wearing a Halloween costume to the event, with a drawing being held prior to the start of the telecast.

=== Storylines ===
Bound for Glory IV featured eight professional wrestling matches and one untelevised match that involved different wrestlers from pre-existing scripted feuds and storylines. Wrestlers portrayed villains, heroes, or less distinguishable characters in the scripted events that built tension and culminated in a wrestling match or series of matches.

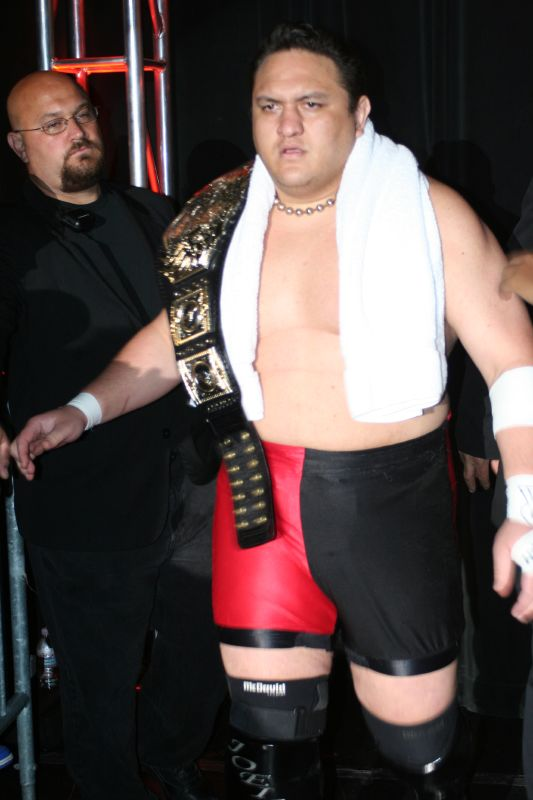
Samoa Joe (pictured) defended the TNA World Heavyweight Championship (pictured) at Bound for Glory IV against Sting.

Heading into Bound for Glory IV, TNA created a company-wide narrative that led to an on-screen rivalry between professional wrestling veterans, who played the villains, and the younger talent of the company, who played the heroic characters. Several matches and storylines that led to the event were connected to this narrative, such as the storyline surrounding the TNA World Heavyweight Championship and the bout pitting Kurt Angle against Jeff Jarrett. This narrative started at TNA's Victory Road PPV event on July 13, where Samoa Joe defended the TNA World Heavyweight Championship against Booker T. During the match, Joe relentlessly assaulted Booker T to the point that referees nor security could stop him. This led to Sting interfering in the contest trying to calm Joe down. Joe refused to listen and continued his assault, causing Sting to hit Joe in the stomach with a baseball in order for Joe to stop, resulting in a no contest. Sting did not state a reason as to why he hit Joe in the weeks after the event. At TNA's Hard Justice PPV event on August 10, A.J. Styles fought Angle in a Last Man Standing match, which he won after injuring Angle's neck in the contest. After the bout, Styles attacked Angle's injured neck, making the injury more severe in the storyline until Sting attacked Styles to prevent the assault from continuing. On the August 14 episode of TNA's television program TNA Impact!, Sting explained that both Joe and Styles had been disrespectful and violent in their current rivalries and matches. He stated that his actions were to end that type of behavior between the younger wrestlers and the veteran wrestlers.

At TNA's previous No Surrender PPV event on September 14, Sting announced that TNA management had decided that he would challenge the TNA World Heavyweight Champion for the title at Bound for Glory. Later in the show, Joe defeated Christian Cage and Angle in a Three Ways to Glory match to retain the TNA World Heavyweight Championship after Jarrett interfered in the bout by bashing a guitar over Angle's head. Following No Surrender on the September 18 episode of Impact!, Sting discussed his actions further, stating that when he was younger he learned from the veterans in the industry and that Joe and Styles had been disrespectful in their rivalries with Booker T and Angle. Jarrett responded to Sting's comments later in the show, stating that the issue was not about disrespect, it was about the veterans in the company not wanting to retire and let the younger wrestlers be stars. Angle argued that he made TNA a success, not the efforts of Jarrett, Sting, Joe, or Styles. Angle then challenged Jarrett to a match at Bound for Glory IV, which Jarrett declined. On the September 25 episode of Impact!, Angle challenged Jarrett to a match again, this time threatening and mocking him along with his daughters. Jarrett accepted Angle's challenge afterwards. Sting also expressed his reasons for having a desire to face Joe for the title on the same telecast, stating that he was taught respect by veterans in his youth so he was going to defeat Joe for the championship at Bound for Glory to teach Joe respect. Mick Foley was announced as the Special Ringside Enforcer for the Jarrett versus Angle bout on the October 2 Impact! episode. Sting and Joe signed the contract for their encounter on the October 9 episode of Impact!, with the stipulation added that there would be no rematch between the two after the event regardless of the outcome.

TNA held a Three Way War between A.J. Styles, Booker T, and Christian Cage at the show. Leading into the event, Styles represented the younger wrestlers in the company, while Booker T represented the veterans. Cage was neutral in the storyline, due to not having revealed which side he had aligned with. This upset Styles in the storyline, who wanted Cage to join the younger wrestlers. On the September 25 episode of Impact!, Styles fought Booker T in a standard match. Booker T won the bout after bashing Styles in the head with a steel briefcase. Styles blamed the loss on Cage, who had interfered in the bout and accidentally cost Styles the win due to a miscommunication. On the October 2 episode of Impact!, the team of Cage, Styles, and Jay Lethal teamed to face the team of Booker T and Team 3D (Brother Devon and Brother Ray) in a Six Man Tag Team match. Another miscommunication between Styles and Cage occurred in the contest, allowing Booker T to pin Cage to win the bout. This led to the October 9 episode of Impact!, when Management Director Jim Cornette announced that Booker T versus Styles with Cage as Special Guest Referee would be the main event of that telecast to settle the issue. Styles defeated Booker T during the show, with Cage assaulting both wrestlers after the contest. Cornette then promoted a Three Way War at Bound for Glory in order to end the overall conflict.

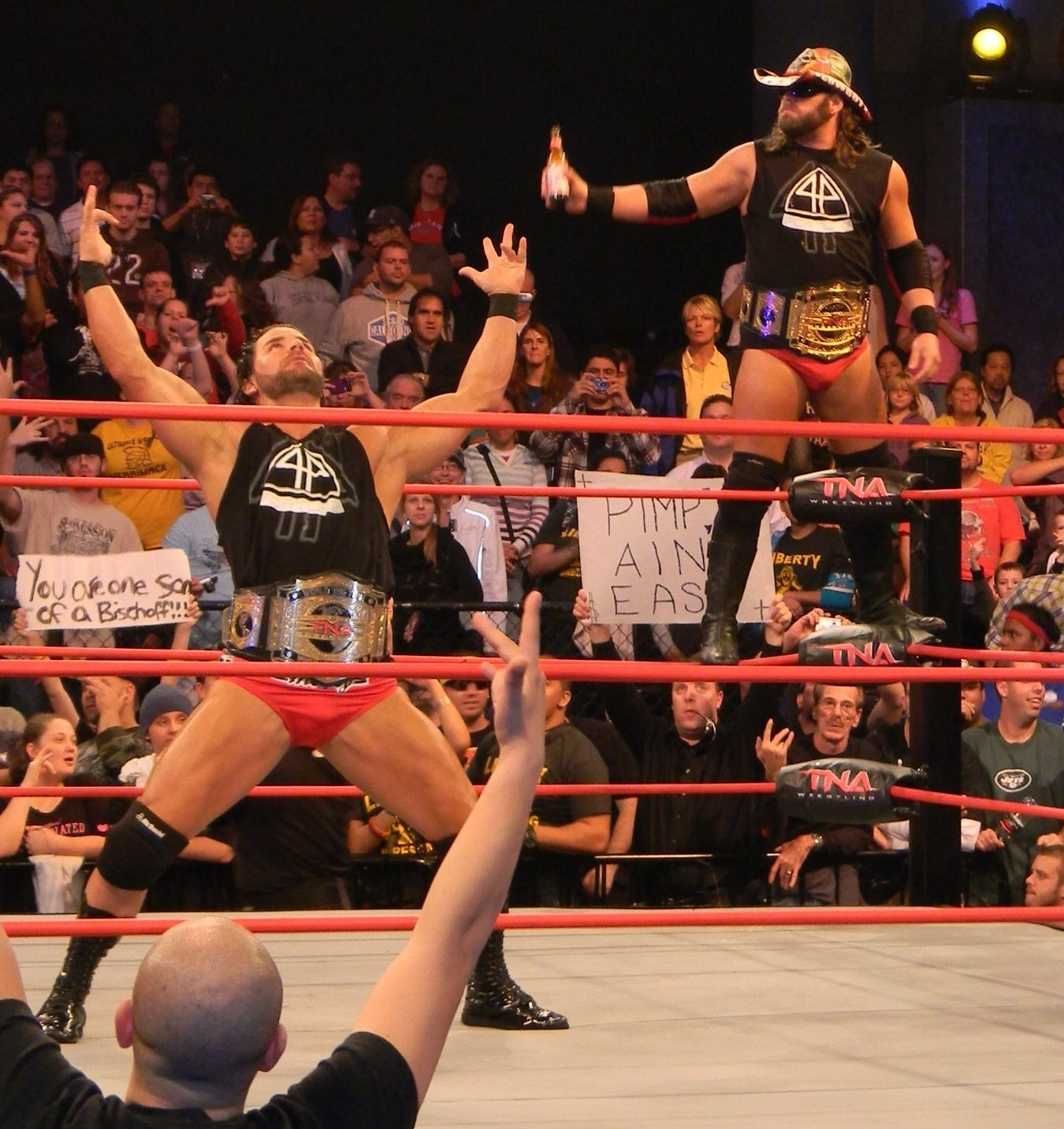
Beer Money, Inc. (James Storm [right] and Robert Roode [left]; pictured) defended the TNA World Tag Team Championship (pictured) at Bound for Glory IV.

The TNA World Tag Team Championship was defended in a Four Way Tag Team Monster's Ball match by Beer Money, Inc. (James Storm and Robert Roode) against the team of Abyss and Matt Morgan, The Latin American Xchange (Hernandez and Homicide; LAX), and Team 3D. On the September 18 episode of Impact!, Matt Morgan announced that TNA were holding a Tag Team Invitational Tournament at Bound for Glory and that he had signed up himself and his partner Abyss for the contest. Team 3D interrupted Morgan and revealed that they were also involved in the tournament. Meanwhile, on the same telecast, Beer Money, Inc. and their manager Jacqueline assaulted LAX's manager Héctor Guerrero. On the September 25 episode of Impact!, Team 3D announced that the match between them and the team of Morgan and Abyss was made a Monster's Ball match. On the same telecast, Beer Money, Inc. defeated LAX in a bout with the stipulation that the losing team lost their manager. This meant that Guerrero could no longer manage LAX in the storyline. On the October 2 episode of Impact!, Management Director Jim Cornette announced that the originally scheduled tournament was cancelled. Instead, TNA was holding a Four Way Tag Team Monster's Ball match for the TNA World Tag Team Championship between the above teams at Bound for Glory IV. TNA issued a press release announcing that Steve McMichael would be the Special Guest Referee for this match after it was promoted for the event.

The TNA X Division Championship was defended by Sheik Abdul Bashir against Consequences Creed at the spectacle. At Hard Justice, Bashir attacked Creed with a steal chair during his bout with Petey Williams for the title, which allowed Williams to force Creed's head into the mat with his signature Canadian Destroyer maneuver to retain the X Division Championship. Creed was given a rematch on the August 21 episode of Impact!, with Bashir once again interfering by attacking Creed, resulting in Creed winning by disqualification and Williams retaining the X Division Championship again. A Three Way match for the title with Williams defending against Bashir and Creed was scheduled for No Surrender. At the event, Bashir defeated Williams and Creed to become the new TNA X Division Champion. On the October 9 episode of Impact!, Creed won a Four Way match to challenge Bashir for the title at Bound for Glory, defeating Sonjay Dutt, Williams, and Jay Lethal in the process.

== Event ==
Prior to the event broadcasting live, TNA held an untelevised match for the audience in attendance. It was an Intergender Tag Team match pitting the team of Eric Young and Sojournor Bolt against Lance Rock and Christy Hemme. The team of Young and Bolt won the contest.

=== Miscellaneous ===
Bound for Glory IV featured employees other than the wrestlers involved in the matches. Mike Tenay and Don West were the commentators for the telecast. Jeremy Borash and David Penzer were ring announcers for the event. Andrew Thomas, Earl Hebner, Rudy Charles, Mark "Slick" Johnson, Traci Brooks, and Steve McMichael participated as referees for the encounters. Lauren Thompson and Borash were used as interviewers during the event. Besides employees who appeared in a wrestling role, SoCal Val, Christy Hemme, Jim Cornette, Raisha Saeed, Jacqueline, Sharmell, and Kevin Nash all appeared on camera, either in backstage or in ringside segments.

=== Preliminary matches ===
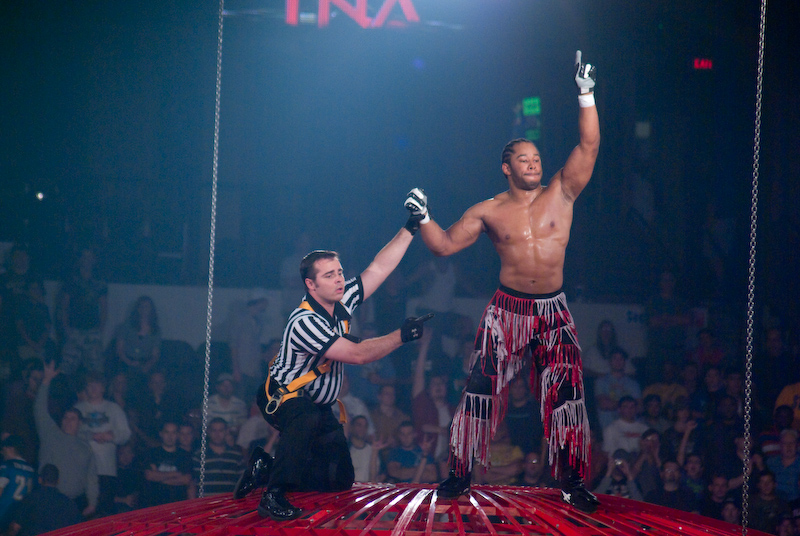
Jay Lethal after winning the Steel Asylum at Bound for Glory IV

The opening televised contest of Bound for Glory was the Steel Asylum to determine the number one contender to the TNA X Division Championship. There were ten participants in this contest; those involved were Alex Shelley, Chris Sabin, Curry Man, Jay Lethal, Jimmy Rave, Johnny Devine, Petey Williams, Shark Boy, Sonjay Dutt, and Super Eric. Christy Hemme accompanied Rave to the ring, while SoCal Val accompanied Dutt. In this encounter, the ring was surrounded by a large red steel cage that domed with a hole in the center of the ceiling. The objective was for a competitor to fight up the walls of the cage and escape via the hole in the center. The first person to complete the task won the match and became number one contender to the TNA X Division Championship. The duration of the bout was 12 minutes and 7 seconds. After several minutes of fighting among one another, several wrestlers attempted to climb the cage but were stopped. At one point, Devine performed his signature Devine Intervention maneuver on Rave, with Rave landing awkwardly on his neck. The winner of the contest was Lethal, who climbed the cage and escaped through the hole while everyone was preoccupied.

A Six Person Intergender Tag Team Bimbo Brawl match with Traci Brooks as the Special Guest Referee was next, pitting the team of ODB, Rhaka Khan, and Rhino against The Beautiful People (Angelina Love, Cute Kip, and Velvet Sky). In this bout, both male and female wrestlers could fight each other and all weapons were legal to use. The only way to win was by pinfall or submission. Rhino won the match for his team after tackling Kip with his signature Gore maneuver at 6 minutes and 15 seconds.

The TNA X Division Championship match followed, with Sheik Abdul Bashir defending against Consequences Creed. The match lasted 9 minutes and 18 seconds. Prior to the contest, ring announcer David Penzer introduced Sgt. Daniel Casara, who in turn introduced Creed. During the bout, Bashir held Creed in a submission hold with the referee attempting to raise Creed's arm three times. If it fell all three times, Bashir would be named the winner. Creed held his arm up on the third try, continuing the match. Bashir won the contest later by pinning Creed with a roll-up pinning maneuver while holding onto the middle rope for leverage. As such, Bashir retained the TNA X Division Championship.

The TNA Women's Knockout Championship was defended by Taylor Wilde against Awesome Kong and Roxxi in a Three Way match next. Raisha Saeed accompanied Kong to the ring. She also interfered in the contest by pulling Roxxi out of the ring and kicking her at ringside. Roxxi later returned to the ring and attacked Kong before being pinned by Wilde with a bridging suplex pin at 5 minutes and 11 seconds. Wilde thus retained the TNA Women's Knockout Championship.

=== Main event matches ===
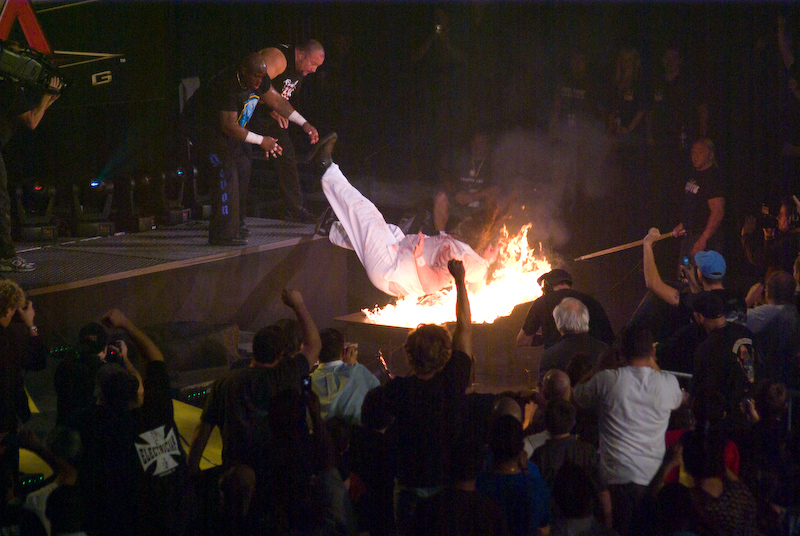
Team 3D (Brother Devon and Brother Ray) forcing Abyss through a flaming table at Bound for Glory IV

The TNA World Tag Team Championship was defended in a Four Way Tag Team Monster's Ball match with Steve McMichael as Special Guest Referee in the fifth contest. Beer Money, Inc. (James Storm and Robert Roode) defended the title against the team of Abyss and Matt Morgan, The Latin American Xchange (Hernandez and Homicide), and Team 3D (Brother Devon and Brother Ray). Jacqueline accompanied Beer Money, Inc. to the ring. The duration of the bout was 20 minutes and 20 seconds. This bout was contested under no count-outs and no disqualification rules with weapons legal and the only way to win was for a competitor to either pin or make another wrestler submit. The match started off with Hernandez jumping over the top rope onto Roode and Storm. Several competitors bled during the contest, such as Devon and Abyss, who was cut open by a cheese grater by Ray. McMichael was directly involved in the match several times. The first being an altercation with Beer Money, Inc., resulting in McMichael attacking Roode. Another time was near the end of the contest when Jacqueline interrupted a pin attempt by Homicide on Storm, with McMichael spanking her in retaliation. The last time was when he aided Hernandez in opening a tied bag of thumbtacks. Johnny Devine interfered in the encounter when Team 3D were assaulting Abyss with various weapons, such as a staple gun. Devine hit Abyss with a kendo stick from behind and helped Devon set up a table on the floor next to the stage. Ray and Devon then sprayed the table with lighter fluid. Devine lit the table on fire before Ray and Devon slammed Abyss through the flaming table off of the stage. The match ended when Team 3D forced Hernandez through a table covered in thumbtacks with their signature 3D tag team maneuver, before Storm spat beer in Devon's eyes and Roode covered Hernandez for the pinfall to retain the TNA World Tag Team Championship.

The sixth match was a Three Way War between A.J. Styles, Booker T, and Christian Cage that lasted 13 minutes and 5 seconds. Sharmell accompanied Booker T to the ring. She interfered in the encounter by giving Booker T a steal briefcase which he used to knockout Styles at ringside. Later, Cage attempted his signature Unprettier maneuver on Styles, who countered the move into an Inverted DDT to force Cage's head into the mat. Styles followed by placing Booker T in an armbar submission hold, before Cage broke it up. Booker T gained a near-fall after slamming Styles back-first against the mat with his trademark Book End maneuver. Afterwards, Booker T performed his popular "Spinarooni" hallmark for the audience before he was attacked by Cage, who went on to mock the move. Cage and Styles fought on top of a turnbuckle before Styles threw Cage off the top and into the ring. Styles followed by performing his signature Spiral Tap maneuver, but Cage moved out of the way. Booker T hit both Styles and Cage with a double Axe Kick, gaining a near-fall on both. A short bit later, Cage performed the Unprettier on Styles from the top of a turnbuckle. As he went for the pin attempt, Booker T hit Cage with an Axe Kick off of a turnbuckle and followed with the pinfall to win the encounter.

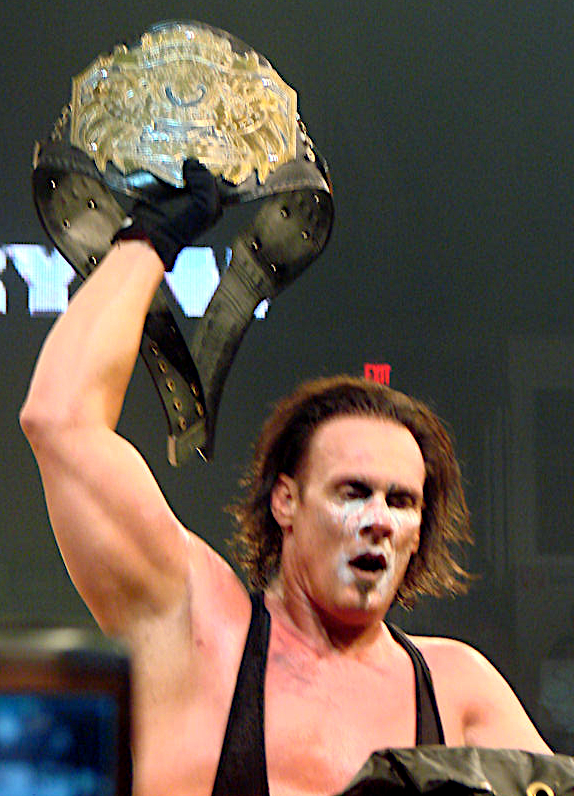
Sting after winning the TNA World Heavyweight Championship at Bound for Glory IV

The seventh match of the show pitted Jeff Jarrett against Kurt Angle, with Mick Foley serving as the Special Ringside Enforcer. Jarrett gained a near-fall in the contest when he suplexed Angle off the top of a turnbuckle. Jarrett then placed Angle in a Figure-Four Leglock submission hold, which was broken by the referee when Angle grabbed the bottom rope. Angle fought back with a series of consecutive German suplexes, forcing Jarrett against the mat back-first. He then placed Jarrett in his signature Ankle lock submission hold, which Jarrett fought Angle to get released. Angle gained a near-fall by slamming Jarrett back-first against the mat with his signature Olympic Slam maneuver. Afterwards, Angle missed an areial splash from the top of a turnbuckle, when Jarrett moved out of the way. Angle then accidentally hit the referee, knocking him out in the storyline. Jarrett followed by performing his signature Stroke maneuver on Angle, with Foley counting the pinfall attempt before Angle kicked out. Afterwards, Angle hit Jarrett in the groin and then attacked Foley with a steel chair at ringside, before returning to the ring to hit Jarrett with the chair as well. Angle then revived the referee who counted Angle's pinfall attempt before Foley stopped the count by pulling the referee from the ring. Foley then attacked Angle and applied his signature Mandible Claw submission hold. Jarrett followed up by bashing a guitar over Angle's head and covering for a pinfall that Foley counted to win the match at 20 minutes and 7 seconds.

The main event was for the TNA World Heavyweight Championship in which the champion Samoa Joe defended against the challenger Sting. The duration of the encounter was 16 minutes and 54 seconds. The beginning of the match had Joe on the offensive, with Joe performing a dive between the ropes to hit Sting in the face with his forearm. The competitors then fought throughout the crowd for an extended period. At one point while the two were fighting on the arena steps, Joe jumped from a luxury box and kicked Sting down the stairs. Afterwards, Sting and Joe fought back towards the ring with each trading the offensive advantage. Back in the ring, Sting earned a near-fall after an aerial splash from the top of a turnbuckle. Joe placed Sting in an STF submission hold after a powerbomb next. Sting reached the ropes, causing the hold to be broken by the referee. Sting threw Joe into a ring corner and performed his signature Stinger Splash before lifting Joe up and slamming Joe neck-first onto the mat with Joe's signature Muscle Buster maneuver. Joe got up off the mat immediately and attacked Sting. He then slammed Sting head and back-first into the mat with Sting's trademark Scorpion Death Drop maneuver. Sting also got up immediately after the move. Later, Kevin Nash entered the arena and walked to the ringside area. Nash had reportedly left the company but his attendance backstage was leaked to various media outlets. As Joe was arguing with the referee, Sting retrieved a baseball bat that he had left at ringside. Nash pulled the bat from Sting's hands, not allowing him to use it in the match. Afterwards, Joe and Sting fought in the ring when Sting dodged a running Joe, causing him to almost collide with referee Earl Hebner who dodged as well. At this time, Nash hit Joe across the back with the baseball bat when Joe came in contact with the ring ropes. Sting followed by performing the Scorpion Death Drop on Joe and pinned him to win the TNA World Heavyweight Championship. The event came to a close as Sting celebrated in-front of the crowd.

== Reception ==
There were several reported attendance figures for Bound for Glory IV, with the initial attendance figure being 5,000 people before being retracted and updated to a total of 5,500 people by The Wrestling Observer Newsletter. This was lower than the maximum seating capacity available at the Sears Centre of between 11,000 and 11,800 people for festival style events. However, the Bound for Glory IV setup caused the event to only hold a maximum capacity of 8,000 people. Of the 5,500 that attended the show, only 4,500 of them were paid tickets. Despite this, it was seen as one of the largest paid crowds in the company's history and one of the most responsive crowds the company has had as well. The Wrestling Observer Newsletter reported that 35,000 people bought the event.

Chris and Bryan Sokol of the Canadian Online Explorer reviewed and rated the show on a scale out of 10, giving it a 7. This was the same rating given to the 2009 edition by Nick Tylwalk, but lower than the 7.5 out of 10 given to the 2007 edition by Chris Sokol. Compared to TNA's previous PPV event No Surrender, Bound for Glory was received better as No Surrender was given a 3 out of 10 by Jason Clevett. Meanwhile, Chris and Bryan Sokol gave TNA's next PPV event Turning Point a 7 out of 10. Rival World Wrestling Entertainment (WWE) produced two PPV events in October that competed against Bound for Glory IV. The first was the No Mercy PPV event on October 5, while the second was the Cyber Sunday PPV event on October 26. No Mercy was reviewed by Chris and Bryan Sokol and given a 6 out of 10, lower than the Bound for Glory IV rating. Cyber Sunday was rated an 8 out of 10 by Andy McNamara, higher than the Bound for Glory rating. Compared to WWE's WrestleMania XXIV PPV event on March 30, Bound for Glory IV was outperformed as WrestleMania XXIV was given a 9 out of 10 by Dale Plummer.

Chris and Bryan Sokol rated the matches on a scale out of 10, with the main event receiving a 7. The Jeff Jarrett versus Kurt Angle bout and the Four Way Tag Team Monster's Ball match were both given an 8 out of 10. The Three Way War between A.J. Styles, Booker T, and Christian Cage was given a 7, while the X Division Championship match got a 6 out of 10. In their review, they commented that the ending of the event was a "sloppy finish to a decent PPV". They felt the Jarrett versus Angle contest was a "great match with lots of close calls and near falls", while the Three Way War they considered was "pretty good". As for the Monster's Ball match, they said that it was "crazy", with "tons of brawling". The X Division Championship encounter was called a "good match" in their review.

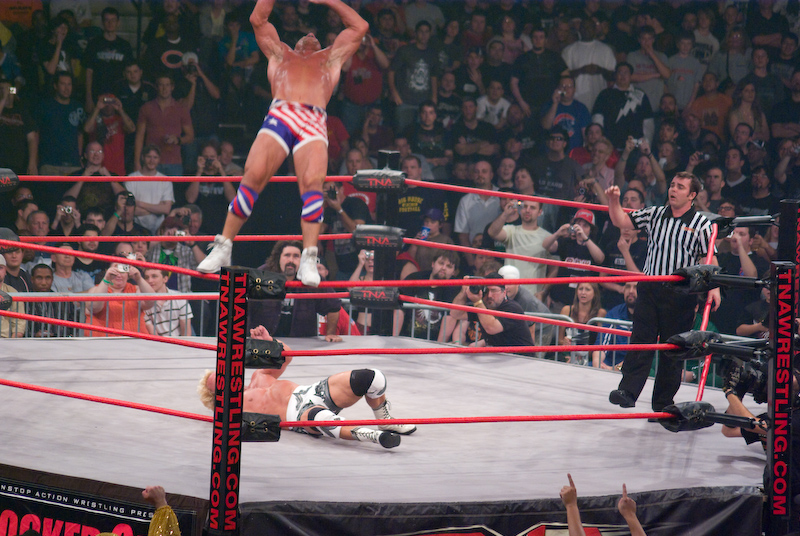
The Kurt Angle versus Jeff Jarrett match at Bound for Glory IV (pictured) was called the "match of the night" by Daniel Wilkenfeld of the Pro Wrestling Torch Newsletter in his review of the event.

Wade Keller of the Pro Wrestling Torch Newsletter reviewed the show. Keller rated the matches on a scale out of 5 stars, with the main event given a 3 1/4 stars and called a "fine match that fit its slot on the PPV well" but had a finish that he described as "horrible". He gave Jarrett versus Angle 3 1/2 stars with Keller commenting that it was a "good old-school match ... but a bit slow". The Three Way War received a 3 star rating, stating that there was "enough good" but overall it was "above-average." The Monster's Ball match was given 3 1/4 stars in the review and called "an exciting match" with Keller explaining that there were "four stars worth of action, but it crossed into gratuitousness" and also criticized some awkward moments and the fire's danger. The X Division Championship contest got 2 1/4 stars with Keller commenting that it "started okay" with the middle being a "little too slow" and that the "build to the finish was solid" but the "actual pin was sloppy".

James Caldwell, also of the Pro Wrestling Torch Newsletter, posted a review of the show rating the matches on the same scale as Keller. The main event was given 3 1/2 stars with Caldwell commenting that it was a "really good main event match" but that the finishing sequence "killed the momentum". The Jarrett and Angle bout got a 4 star rating and called a "really nice match with a good story". Caldwell clarified that the "finish didn't hurt the drama". He also complimented Jarrett's "great physical condition in his first match back". The Three Way War received 3 stars with Caldwell saying it had "some really good moments". Caldwell called the Monster's Ball match a "heck of a stunt brawl" that "came off pretty well with tons of energy" before giving it 3 1/2 stars. He referred to the X Division Championship encounter as a "good singles match" and gave it 2 stars.

Daniel Wilkenfeld, also of the Pro Wrestling Torch Newsletter, posted a review of the telecast. Wilkenfeld gave some overall comments on the show, saying the "first half of the card dragged" but the "latter half picked up the pace a lot". Wilkenfeld compared the event against "normal TNA PPV standards" with Bound for Glory IV being a "pretty good outing", giving it either a "B+, or maybe even an A−" as an average show but since it was Bound for Glory the bar was raised higher so he only gave it a C. He called Samoa Joe the "Star of the Night" for getting a "largely pro-Sting crowd behind his destructive ways". Wilkenfeld called the Jarrett and Angle bout as the possible "match of the night" in his review. He referred to the flaming table portion of the Monster's Ball match as being "an insane flaming table spot" in which he could not understand how those are done "without bad things happening". He was disappointed by the X Division Championship match, and said that it never got past its "competent" beginning, with its conclusion "both arbitrary and blown".

== Aftermath ==
=== On-screen ===
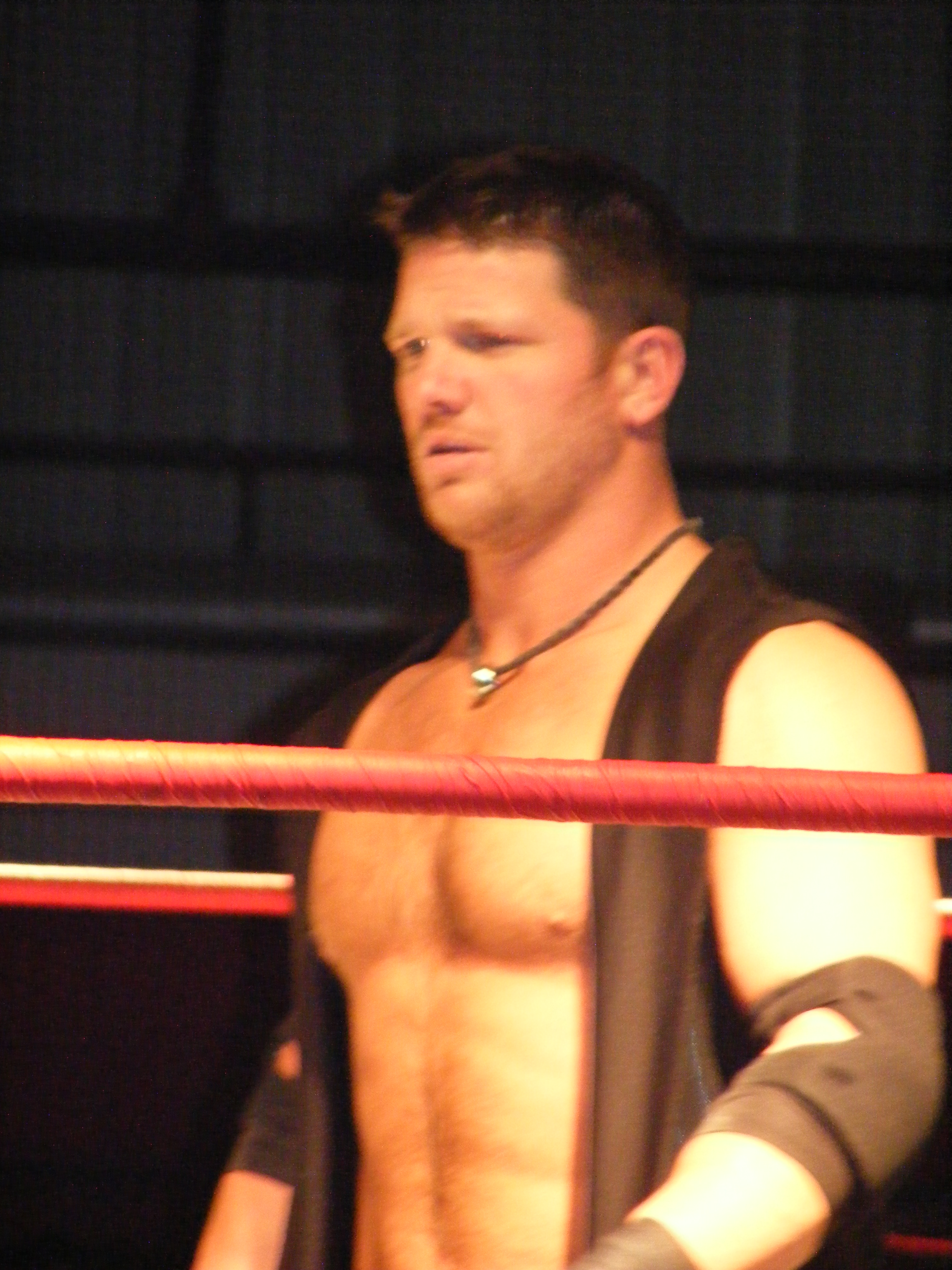
A.J. Styles (pictured) went on to challenge Sting for the TNA World Heavyweight Championship at TNA's Turning Point PPV event.

Following Bound for Glory IV, TNA continued the rivalry between the veteran wrestlers and the younger wrestlers. At Turning Point on November 9, TNA held several matches connected to this overall narrative. Since Samoa Joe and Sting agreed on the stipulation that there would be no rematch between the two, Sting went on to feud with A.J. Styles while Joe fought Kevin Nash. On the October 23 episode of Impact!, the veterans in TNA formed the group The Main Event Mafia, consisting of Sting, Kurt Angle, Nash, Booker T, and Scott Steiner. Meanwhile, the younger wrestlers formed The TNA Front Line led by Joe and Styles.

Heading into Turning Point, Styles and Sting argued over Sting assaulting Styles at Hard Justice. On the October 30 episode of Impact!, newly made co-owner of TNA Mick Foley advertised Sting defending the TNA World Heavyweight Championship against Styles at Turning Point. Sting retained the title at the event. Sting and Styles fought again at TNA's Final Resolution PPV event on December 7, this time in an Eight Man Tag Team Match pitting The Main Event Mafia (Sting, Nash, Steiner, and Booker T) against The TNA Front Line (Styles, Joe, Brother Devon, and Brother Ray) for the TNA World Heavyweight Championship. The Main Event Mafia won the match, thus Sting retained the championship for a second time against Styles. Sting and Styles fought one last time for the TNA World Heavyweight Championship, but not for several months. They clashed one final time at the 2009 Bound for Glory event on October 18. At that event, Styles headed into the bout as the TNA World Heavyweight Champion. Styles defeated Sting to retain the championship at the show.

The storyline behind Nash's betrayal began in December 2007. At the 2007 Turning Point event, Joe was scheduled to take part in a Six Man Tag Team match, partnering with Nash and Nash's longtime real-life friend Scott Hall to face The Angle Alliance (Angle, Styles, and Tomko). Hall missed the event citing "food poisoning", leaving Joe legitimately angered by the excuse, causing him to make an on-camera statement insulting Hall. Following the incident, TNA began a storyline in which Joe was unhappy with his position in the company for various reasons and had continuous conflicts with Nash. After time, Nash became Joe's on-screen mentor, which led to Joe defeating Angle on April 13 at TNA's Lockdown PPV event to become the new TNA World Heavyweight Champion. On the October 30 episode of Impact!, Foley announced that Joe would face Nash at Turning Point. Nash defeated Joe at the event. Joe and Nash fought again at Final Resolution when they competed on opposing teams in the Eight Man Tag Team match for the TNA World Heavyweight Championship, which Nash's team won. Nash and Joe did not have another match until April 19, 2009 at TNA's Lockdown PPV event, when Joe was a part of Team Jarrett (Jarrett, Styles, Daniels, and Joe) and Nash was a part of Team Angle (Angle, Steiner, Booker T, and Nash) in a Lethal Lockdown match. Team Jarrett won the encounter; Joe went on to defeat Nash on May 24 at TNA's Sacrifice PPV event afterwards.

Another encounter connected to the narrative that was advertised for Turning Point was Kurt Angle versus Abyss in a Falls Count Anywhere match. After Angle lost to Jeff Jarrett at Bound for Glory IV, Angle challenged Jarrett to a rematch, which was refused on the October 16 episode of Impact!. To get Jarrett to accept his challenge, Angle assaulted several wrestlers in TNA. On the October 23 episode of Impact!, Angle challenged Jarrett to a rematch for the second time. Jarrett refused the offer for a second time, but recommended a casualty of Angle's attacks, Abyss, as Angle's opponent. On the October 30 episode of Impact!, a contest between Angle and Abyss ended in a disqualification after Angle struck Abyss with a steel chair. Following their encounter, a match was promoted pitting Angle against Abyss in a Falls Count Anywhere match at Turning Point. Angle won the bout at the show.

On the October 23 episode of Impact!, Booker T introduced a new championship named the TNA Legends Championship and declared himself the inaugural champion. Afterwards, Christian Cage challenged Booker T to defend the championship against him at Turning Point. Booker T accepted after he added the stipulation that if Cage lost the encounter Cage would have to join The Main Event Mafia. Later on the October 30 episode of Impact!, the match was made official when it was promoted for the event. Booker T retained the championship at Turning Point, defeating Cage and causing him to join the veterans and The Main Event Mafia in the storyline.

=== Off-screen ===
A few wrestlers were injured at Bound for Glory IV. The Wrestling Observer Newsletter reported that Abyss suffered burns to his arms after going through a flaming table at the event. Jimmy Rave received a neck injury from being dropped on his head badly by Johnny Devine during the Steel Asylum.

The Wrestling Observer Newsletter reported that almost all of the participants involved in the Four Way Tag Team Monster's Ball match at the show were furious over how Steve McMichael performed as the Special Guest Referee. Some of the reported issues were slow counting and being out of position, which several felt "screwed up the match." McMichael was originally supposed to have served as a Special Ringside Enforcer, but TNA personnel did not want the role done twice in one night. The decision to change him to the Special Guest Referee was made the day of the show by Jeff Jarrett.

== Results ==
No.	Results	Stipulations	Times
1^{D}	Eric Young and Sojournor Bolt defeated Lance Rock and Christy Hemme	Intergender tag team match	—
2	Jay Lethal defeated Alex Shelley, Chris Sabin, Curry Man, Jimmy Rave, Johnny Devine, Petey Williams, Shark Boy, Sonjay Dutt and Super Eric	Steel Asylum to determine the #1 contender to the TNA X Division Championship	12:07
3	ODB, Rhaka Khan and Rhino defeated The Beautiful People (Angelina Love, Cute Kip and Velvet Sky)	Bimbo Brawl match with Traci Brooks as special guest referee	6:15
4	Sheik Abdul Bashir (c) defeated Consequences Creed	Singles match for the TNA X Division Championship	9:18
5	Taylor Wilde (c) defeated Awesome Kong (with Raisha Saeed) and Roxxi	Three-way match for the TNA Women's Knockout Championship	5:11
6	Beer Money, Inc. (James Storm and Robert Roode) (c) (with Jacqueline) defeated Abyss and Matt Morgan, The Latin American Xchange (Hernandez and Homicide), and Team 3D (Brother Devon and Brother Ray)	Monster's Ball match for the TNA World Tag Team Championship with Steve McMichael as special guest referee	20:20
7	Booker T (with Sharmell) defeated A.J. Styles and Christian Cage	Three Way War	13:05
8	Jeff Jarrett defeated Kurt Angle	Singles match with Mick Foley as special guest enforcer	20:07
9	Sting defeated Samoa Joe (c)	Singles match for the TNA World Heavyweight Championship	16:54
(c) / – the champion(s) heading into the match; D / – this was a dark match

== See also ==
- Starrcade

== Gallery ==
Several images captured at the Bound for Glory IV PPV event on October 12, 2008.

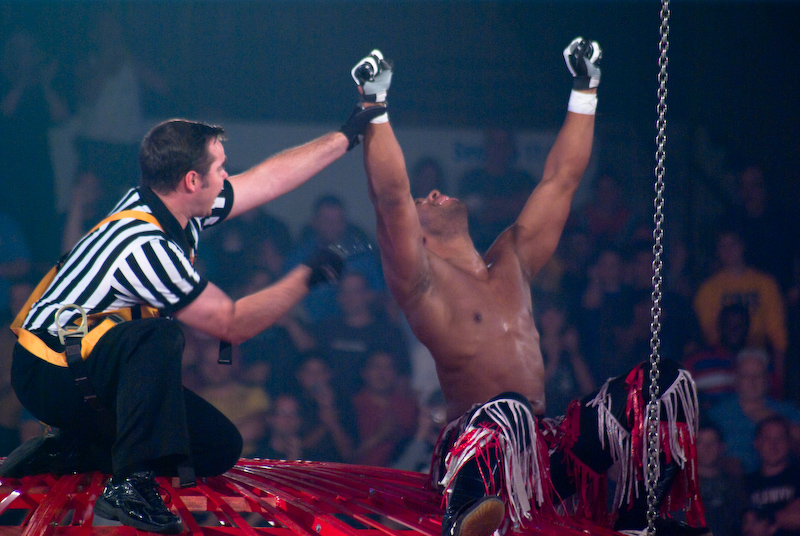
Jay Lethal after winning the Steel Asylum at Bound for Glory IV

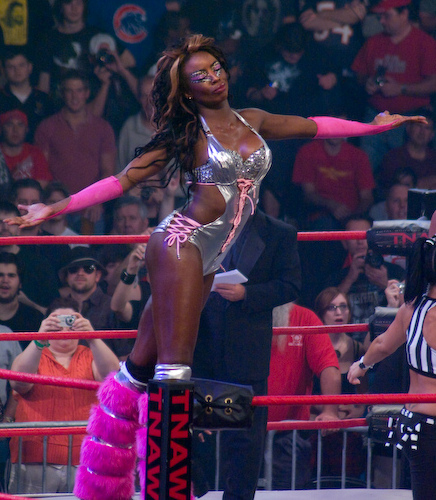
Rhaka Khan at Bound for Glory IV

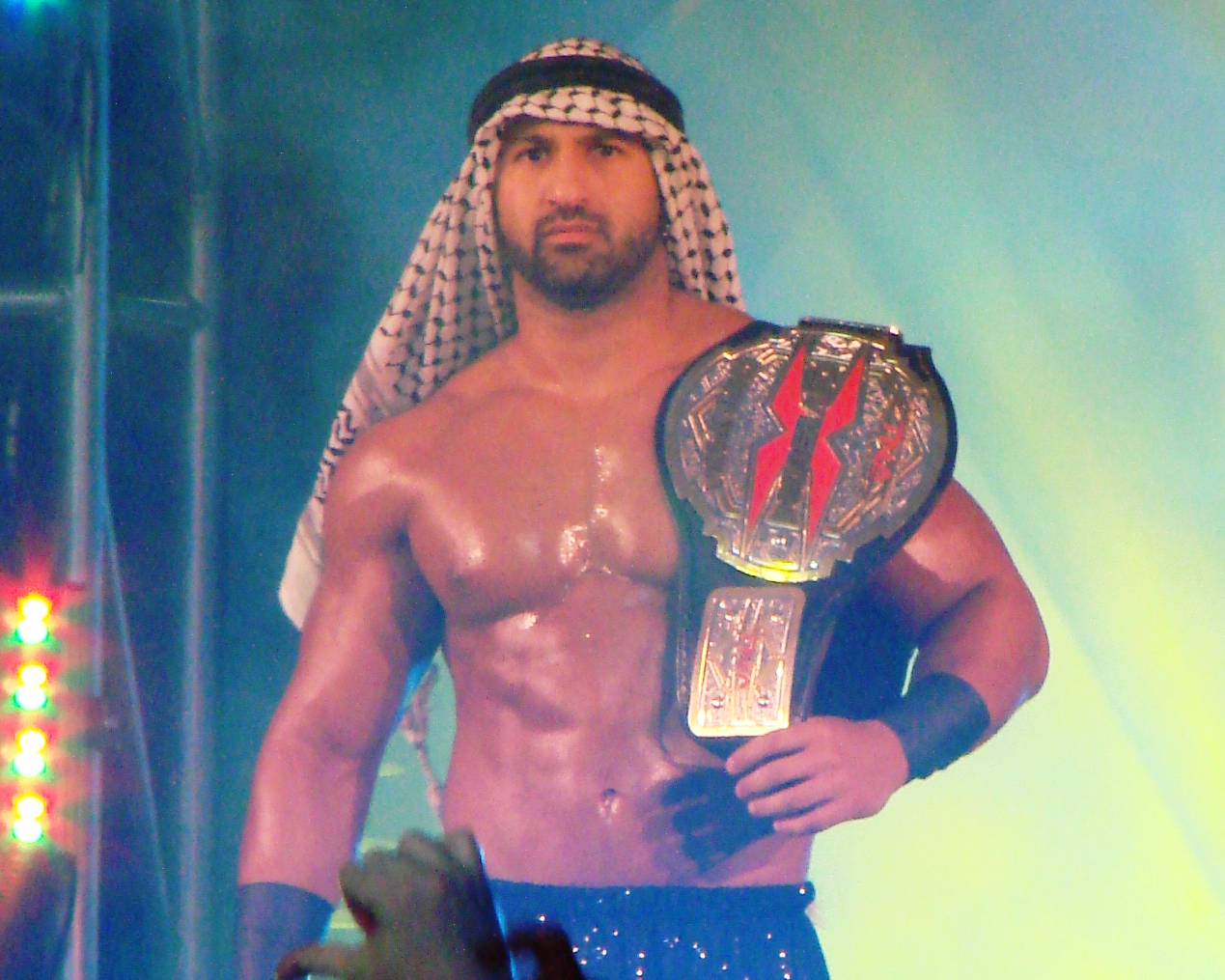
Sheik Abdul Bashir during his entrance at Bound for Glory IV

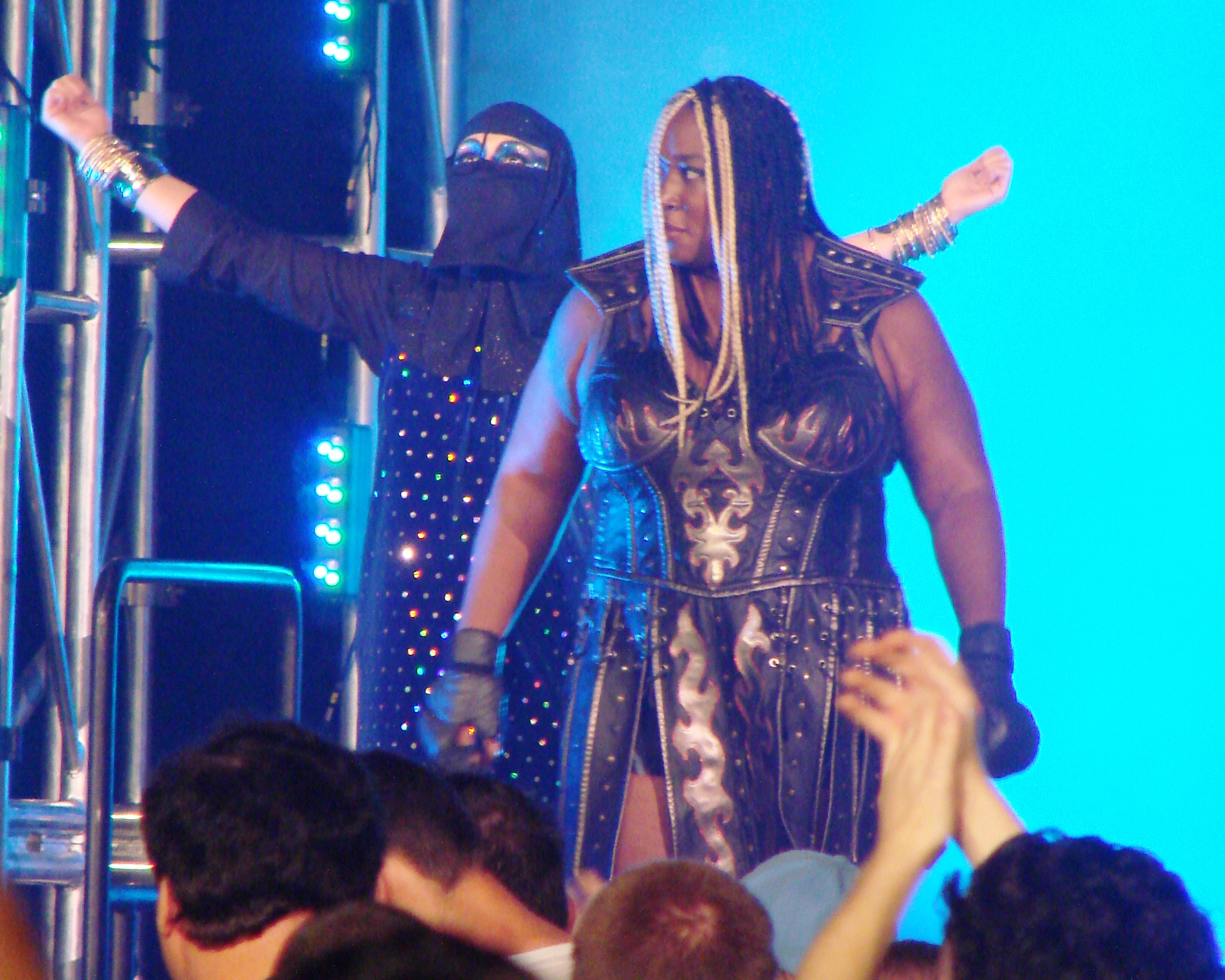
Awesome Kong (with Raisha Saeed) making her entrance at Bound for Glory IV

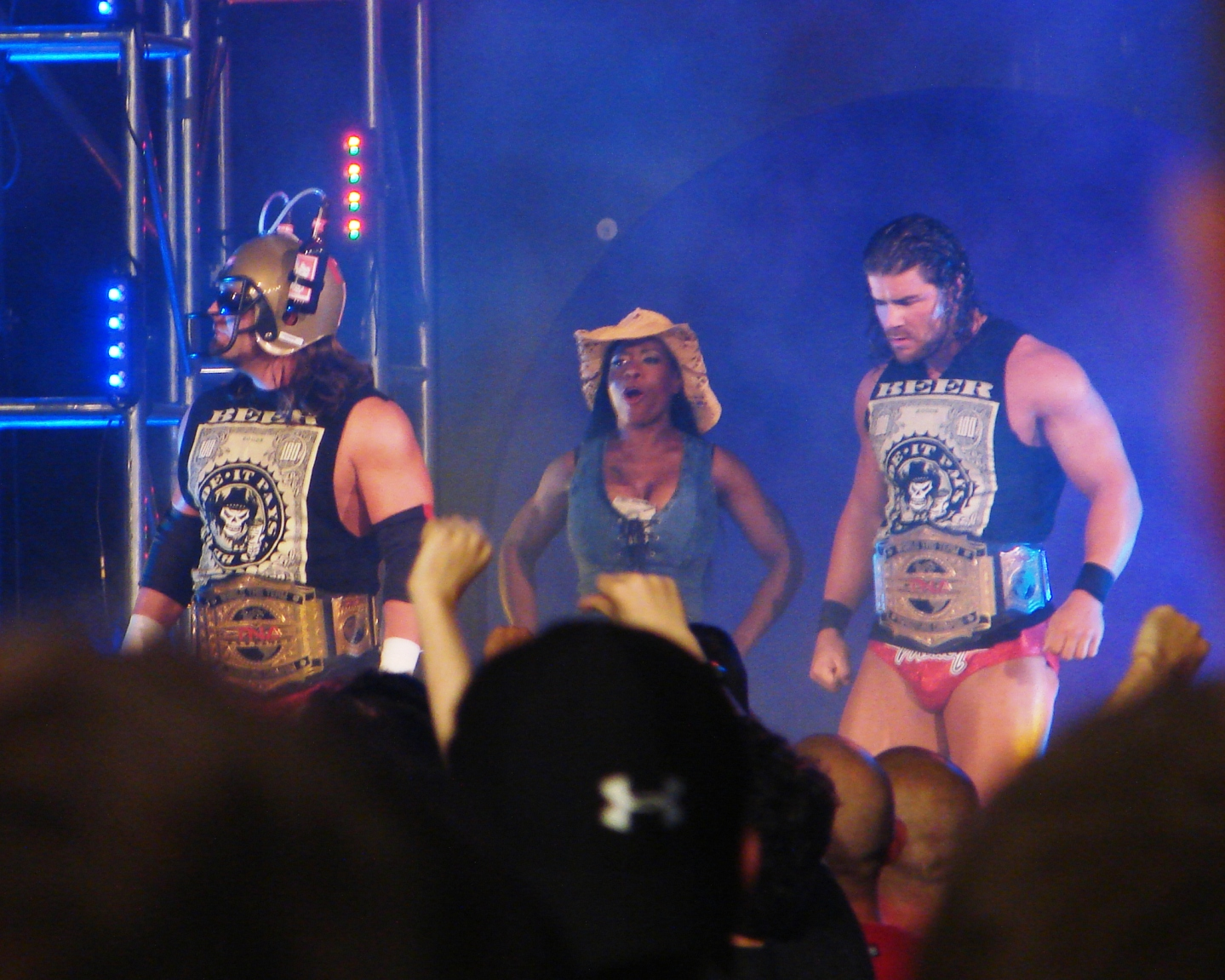
Beer Money, Inc. (James Storm and Robert Roode) with Jacqueline making their entrance at Bound for Glory IV

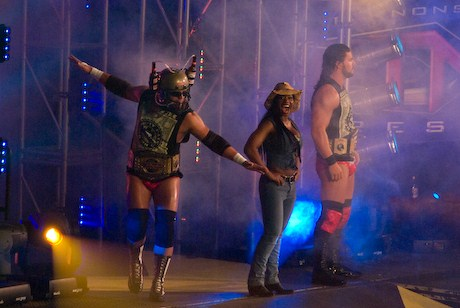
Beer Money, Inc. (James Storm and Robert Roode) with Jacqueline during their entrance at Bound for Glory IV

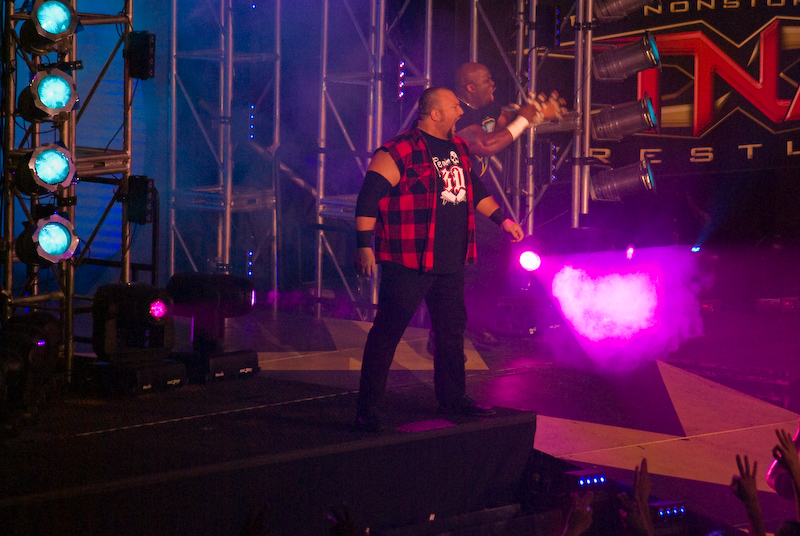
Team 3D (Brother Devon and Brother Ray) making their entrance at Bound for Glory IV

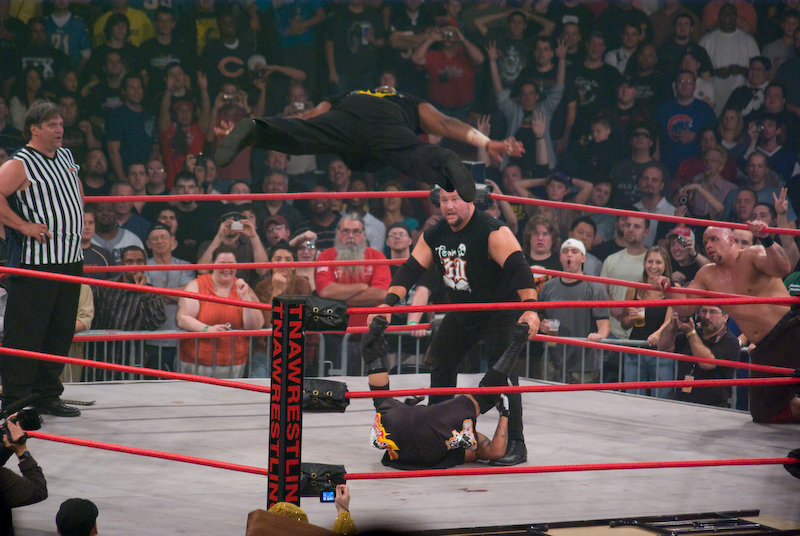
Team 3D (Brother Devon and Brother Ray) performing Whassup? on Homicide at Bound for Glory IV

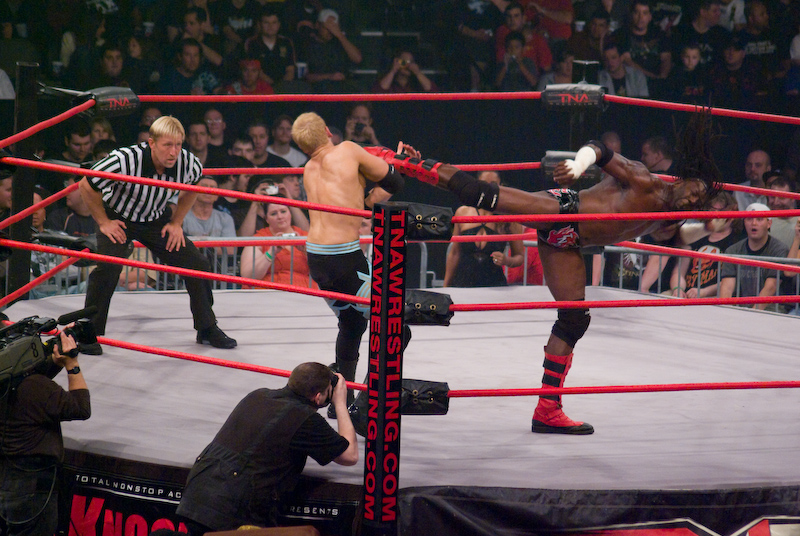
Booker T and Christian Cage competing at Bound for Glory IV

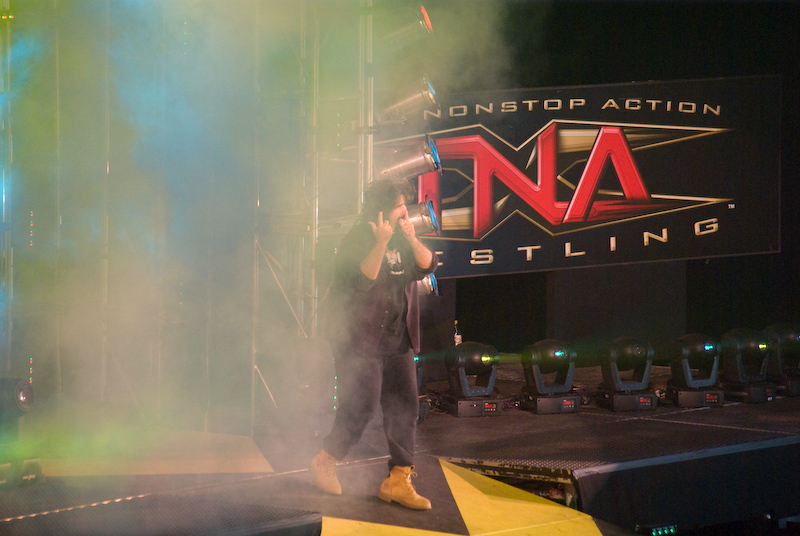
Mick Foley making his entrance at Bound for Glory IV

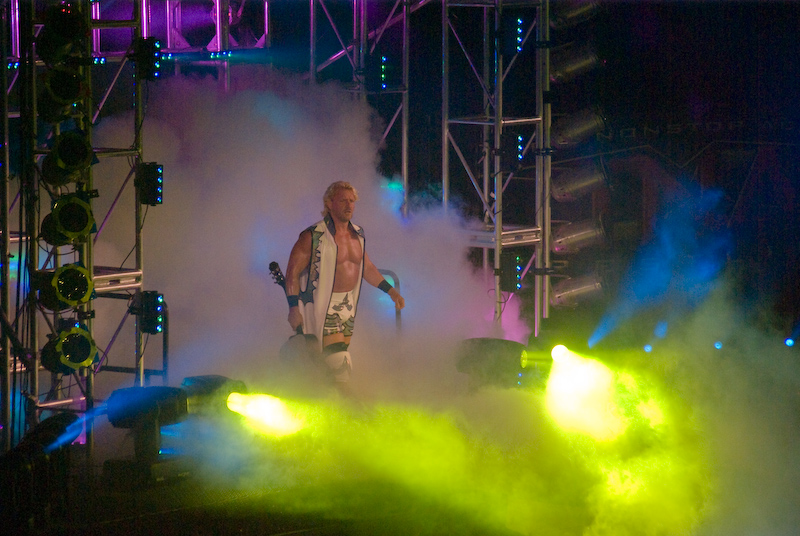
Jeff Jarrett making his entrance at Bound for Glory IV

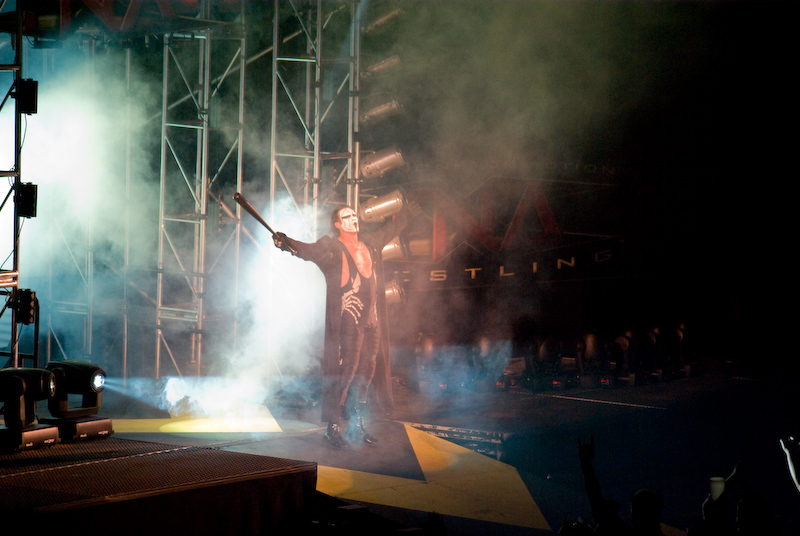
Sting making his entrance at Bound for Glory IV

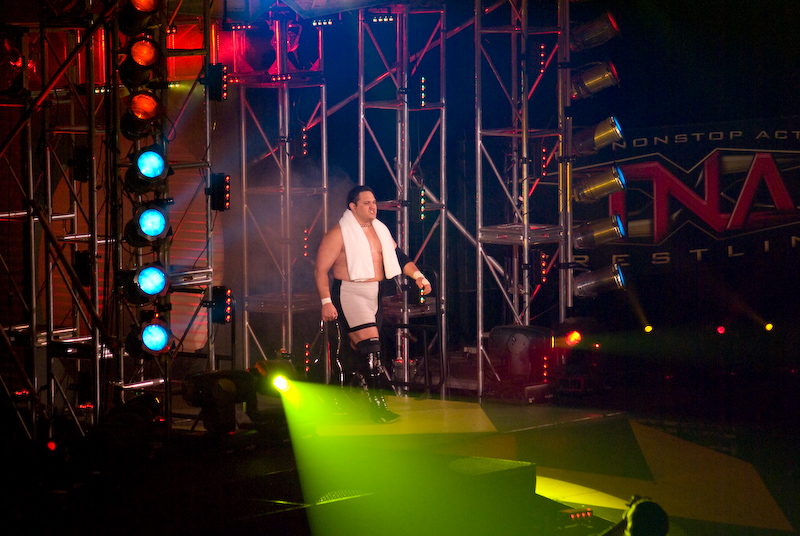
Samoa Joe making his entrance at Bound for Glory IV

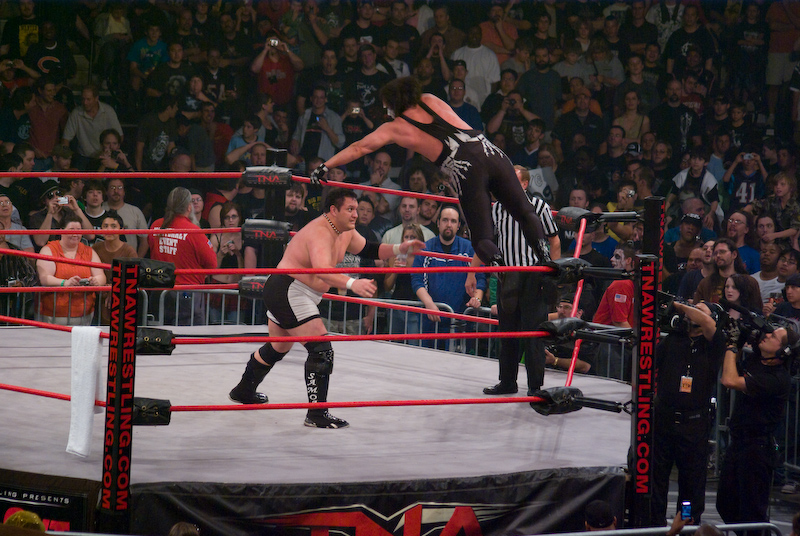
Sting and Samoa Joe competing at Bound for Glory IV
