= Jimmy Rave =

American professional wrestler (1982–2021)

- Rave in 2017

Personal information
- Born: James Michael Guffey; December 8, 1982 Atlanta, Georgia, U.S.
- Died: December 12, 2021 (aged 39) Philadelphia, Pennsylvania, U.S.

Professional wrestling career
- Ring name(s): Jimmy Rave; Mr. XTC
- Billed height: 6 ft 0 in (183 cm)
- Billed weight: 210 lb (95 kg)
- Billed from: Atlanta, Georgia "Ghana, West Africa by way of Atlanta, Georgia" "The Underground"
- Trained by: Murder One
- Debut: October 1999
- Retired: November 2020

James Michael Guffey (December 8, 1982 – December 12, 2021), better known by the ring name Jimmy Rave, was an American professional wrestler. He was best known for his time with Ring of Honor (ROH) and Total Nonstop Action Wrestling (TNA).

== Early life ==
James Michael Guffey was born in Atlanta, Georgia, on December 8, 1982.

== Professional wrestling career ==
=== Early career (1999–2005) ===
Trained by Murder One, Guffey debuted in October 1999 as the masked Mr. XTC. He later adopted the ring name Jimmy Rave. Rave wrestled for numerous professional wrestling promotions on the independent circuit, amongst them Combat Zone Wrestling, Full Impact Pro and NWA Wildside, where he won both the NWA Wildside Junior Heavyweight Championship and the NWA World Junior Heavyweight Championship twice, toured Japan with the Dragon Gate promotion on two occasions and competed in the Best of the Super Juniors for New Japan Pro-Wrestling in 2008, and made several appearances with Total Nonstop Action Wrestling as well as an appearance on World Wrestling Entertainment's Sunday Night Heat program in March 2005 losing to Chris Masters.

=== Ring of Honor (2003–2007) ===
Rave debuted in Ring of Honor in 2003. He later became a member of The Embassy, a stable led by Prince Nana, and was nicknamed "The Crown Jewel of the Embassy".

Early on, Rave gained notoriety for having received excessive heel heat from ROH fans. In ROH it was common for fans to throw streamers over the wrestlers they support. Rave, however, had become a sort of cult recipient as fans threw rolls of toilet paper at him instead. ROH announced on November 6, 2006, that the throwing of toilet paper had been banned from all ROH shows after Jimmy Rave tried to attack a fan who threw a roll at him after his match.

Rave developed a habit of stealing other wrestlers finishers and claiming them as his own. An example would be when he began to use the Rave Clash, a copy of Styles' own Styles Clash, and said he invented it and that Styles stole it from him. After losing a match to Styles in ROH where the stipulation was the loser could no longer use their respective version of the move, Rave began to use the Greetings From Ghana, a copy of Triple H's Pedigree, as his new finisher and would again claim that he had in fact invented that move too.

On January 14, 2006, in Philadelphia, Rave and Alex Shelley of The Embassy attacked ROH World Champion Bryan Danielson after a successful title defense. At Tag Wars 2006, Rave, along with Shelley and Abyss, won the 2006 Trios Tournament. Rave used his title shot earned at the Tag Wars 2006, but came up short in his match with Danielson at the Fourth Anniversary Show.

In 2006, Rave had sporadically been tagging with Alex Shelley in search of the ROH Tag Team Titles, but after Shelley left the company in mid-year, Rave returned to singles action briefly. He found himself on the losing side of several encounters with Davey Richards. Soon Nana brought in a new tag partner, Sal Rinauro, and the two began working through the tag ranks.

In September 2006, Prince Nana announced his departure from Ring of Honor, ending The Embassy. Jimmy Rave would then go on a losing streak, until he scored a major upset by pinning ROH World Championship number one contender Homicide. The rest of the year and the early part of 2007, Rave feuded with Nigel McGuinness, culminating in a match on March 4, 2007, in Liverpool, England, where McGuinness finally managed to pin Rave in a Fight Without Honor to end the rivalry. Following the match, Rave was temporarily sidelined from in-ring action due to a broken jaw. In storyline the injury was credited with McGuinness hitting him with a lariat, but in reality Rave had broken his jaw a month earlier in a match against Samoa Joe. During his recuperation Rave was prescribed with pain medication, which later led to an addiction.

On May 22, 2007, it was announced that Rave had signed a contract with Ring of Honor. On August 2, 2007, however, it was announced that Rave had left both Ring of Honor and Full Impact Pro.

=== Total Nonstop Action Wrestling (2007–2009, 2011, 2013) ===
Rave in May 2008 as a member of the Rock 'n' Rave Infection

In August 2007 it was announced that Rave had signed a contract with Total Nonstop Action Wrestling. He returned to the promotion at No Surrender on September 9, 2007, where he appeared alongside Christy Hemme and Lance Hoyt, later known as Lance Rock. The trio was subsequently named the Rock 'n Rave Infection, with Hemme, Rock and Rave adopting the mannerisms of a rock band and carrying Guitar Hero game controllers to the ring. He then became a jobber to the X Division, and the Tag Team division with Lance Rock, putting over such teams as Team 3D, LAX, Prince Justice Brotherhood and the Motor City Machine Guns. At Bound for Glory, Rave competed in the Reverse Battle Royal which was won by Eric Young. At Turning Point, Rave competed in the Feast or Fired but failed to win the match. At Final Resolution, The Rock 'n Rave Infection lost to Latin American Xchange (Hernandez and Homicide). At Destination X, The Rock 'n Rave Infection lost a Three Way Tag Team match to determine number one contenders to the TNA World Tag Team Championship. At Lockdown, The Rock 'n Rave Infection competed in a Six Team Cuffed in the Cage match where they lost. At Sacrifice, Rave competed in a TerrorDome match which was won by Kaz. At No Surrender, The Rock 'n Rave Infection (Rave, Lance Rock, and Christy Hemme) lost to Curry Man, Shark Boy, and Super Eric in a Six-person intergender tag team match.

In October 2008 Rave suffered a neck injury at Bound for Glory IV in the Steel Asylum match. The injury was minor as he quickly recovered and appeared at Turning Point and on Impact!. at Final Resolution, Rave competed in a Feast or Fired match but failed to win the match. At Genesis, Rave, Kiyoshi and Sonjay Dutt lost to Eric Young and The Latin American Xchange (Hernandez and Homicide) in a Six-man tag team elimination match.

On February 11, 2009, Rave was released from his TNA contract along with his former tag team partner, Lance Hoyt.

On June 13, 2011, at the tapings of the June 16 edition of Impact Wrestling, Rave made a one night return to TNA, losing to Austin Aries in a three–way first round match of a tournament for a TNA contract, which also included Kid Kash. On October 26, Rave defeated Kyle Matthews in a dark match at the Impact Wrestling tapings in Macon, Georgia. In December 2011, Rave took part in TNA's India project, Ring Ka King, where he worked as a trainer and wrestled in a tag team with Zema Ion. On January 12, 2013, Rave took part in the tapings of TNA's One Night Only: X-Travaganza special (aired on April 5, 2013), wrestling in a seven-man Xscape match, which was won by Christian York.

=== Ring of Honor (2009, 2011, 2013) ===
Rave (right) in Ring of Honor in August 2013

On March 21, 2009, at ROH's seventh anniversary show, Rave made a surprise return to the company when Prince Nana announced him as Bison Smith's mystery tag team partner. Rave and Smith lost the tag match to Bryan Danielson and the also returning Colt Cabana when Cabana pinned Rave. Rave spent the rest of the year feuding with Grizzly Redwood and Necro Butcher. On September 19 Rave was defeated by Necro Butcher in a dog collar match and subsequently left the promotion. Rave later revealed that ROH released him due to his drug addiction.

Rave returned to Ring of Honor on December 16, 2011, appearing on an episode of the ROH Video Wire, challenging The Embassy's new Crown Jewel Tommaso Ciampa to a match at Final Battle 2011. At the pay-per-view on December 23, Rave was defeated following interference from members of the Embassy.

On March 2, 2013, Rave made his return for Ring of Honor at the ROH 11th Anniversary Show iPPV, where he, Cliff Compton, Matt Hardy and Rhett Titus, revealed themselves as the newest members of S.C.U.M. by attacking numerous members of the ROH roster following the main event, joining Kevin Steen, Jimmy Jacobs, Rhino and Steve Corino as members of the group. On June 10, 2013, it was reported that Rave was once again done with ROH.

=== Independent circuit (2009–2020) ===
Jimmy Rave made his debut with Great Championship Wrestling on April 3, 2009, with a victory over his trainer, Murder One. Murder and Rave would subsequently battle throughout the summer, in a series of matches in which Rave finally defeated Murder for the GCW Heavyweight Championship. Of these battles, the July 16 street fight between the two that saw them brawl all over the GCW building, and the August 29 Mayhem in Milledgeville road show match, both stand out as two of the best matches the promotion had seen in over two years. Rave lost the championship belt in September to Johnny Swinger, who revealed himself to be plotting against Rave for months, while masquerading as a babyface. Rave would eventually regain the GCW Heavyweight championship a month later in October. His feud with Sal Rinauro, which began on May 14, 2009, with a hard-fought match that saw Rave win after 30 minutes of action, picked up once again, as Rinauro (returning from a hiatus from the organization) returned to challenge Rave for the GCW title on November 12, only to once again be defeated by him.

Rave also competed for Rampage Pro Wrestling (RPW), an organization overseen by former WWE referee Nick Patrick, and former Deep South Wrestling owner, Jody Hamilton, debuting in May 2009 and taking over head booker duties in June 2010. Rave continued to be one of the most popular stars there, defeating the likes of Adrian Hawkins, and Jeremy Vein, on his way up to contention for the heavyweight title, at the time held by Bull Buchanan. On December 6, 2009, he defeated Sal Rinauro to win the Rampage Pro Wrestling (RPW) Intercontinental Championship. He also went on to form the Jimmy Rave Approved stable, while working for RPW.

In January 2010 Rave suffered a broken nose, which would sideline him for six weeks, and as a result he was stripped of both the GCW Heavyweight and the RPW Intercontinental Titles.

On February 21, 2011, Dragon Gate USA announced that Rave would be making his debut for the promotion on April 1 in Burlington, North Carolina. In his debut Rave entered the Breakout Challenge Series, defeating Kyle Matthews, Lince Dorado and Sugar Dunkerton in his first round match. Later in the night, Rave was defeated in the finals of the tournament by Arik Cannon. On April 3 at Open the Ultimate Gate, Rave was defeated by Johnny Gargano in a singles match. On July 31, Rave was given the opportunity to wrestle for the NWA World Heavyweight Championship, but was defeated by Adam Pearce in the four-way match, which also included Chance Prophet and Shaun Tempers.

On June 22, 2014, Rave made his debut for Atlanta Wrestling Entertainment (AWE), defeating Drew Adler. At AWE's To Be The Man! show on June 18, 2015, at The Masquerade, Rave participated in a 12-man tournament for the Georgia Wrestling Crown Championship. He won his opening three-way match against Kyle Matthews and Sugar Dunkerton, then defeated Raphael King in the semifinals and finally Chip Day in the finals to win the tournament and become the first ever GWC Champion. As GWC Champion, Rave made successful defenses against the likes of Cedric Alexander, Davey Richards, Gunner, Johnny Gargano, AR Fox, Sami Callihan and Tommaso Ciampa until losing the title to Martin Stone.

== Personal life ==
Rave had two children from a previous marriage. At the time of his death in December 2021, he was living in Philadelphia with his fiancée and fellow wrestler Gabby Gilbert.

Guffey had admitted to having past problems with drug addiction, which he blamed for his underwhelming performances in 2009. After leaving Ring of Honor, he checked into rehab and eventually got a job as the director of the Peer Support, Wellness and Respite Center in Bartow County, Georgia.

Guffey announced his retirement via Twitter on November 28, 2020, due to an infection in his left arm that required amputation. On October 24, 2021, he tweeted that he had recently had both of his legs amputated due to an MRSA infection.

== Death ==
Guffey died after a double leg amputation due to a MRSA infection at the age of 39 in Philadelphia on December 12, 2021.

== Championships and accomplishments ==
- Atlanta Wrestling Entertainment
  - GWC Championship (1 time, inaugural)
  - GWC Championship Tournament (2015)
- Combat Zone Wrestling
  - CZW Iron Man Championship (1 time)
  - Trifecta Elimination (2003)
  - CZW Hall of Fame (2023)
- Empire Wrestling Entertainment/Scenic City Invitational
  - Scenic City Invitational Tournament (2015)
- Full Impact Pro
  - FIP Tag Team Championship (1 time, inaugural) – with Fast Eddie Vegas
  - FIP Tag Team Championship tournament (2005)
- Great Championship Wrestling
  - GCW Heavyweight Championship (2 times)
- Hardcore Championship Wrestling
  - HCW Hardcore Championship (1 time)
- National Wrestling Alliance
  - NWA World Junior Heavyweight Championship (2 times)
- NWA Wildside
  - NWA Wildside Junior Heavyweight Championship (2 times)
- Peachstate Wrestling Alliance
  - Georgia Junior Heavyweight Championship (1 time)
  - PWA Heritage Championship (1 time)
- Pro Wrestling Illustrated
  - Ranked No. 181 of the top 500 singles wrestlers in the PWI 500 in 2009
- Rampage Pro Wrestling
  - RPW Intercontinental Championship (1 time)
  - RPW Television Championship (1 time)
- Ring of Honor
  - Trios Tournament (2006) – with Alex Shelley and Abyss
- Southern Fried Championship Wrestling
  - SFCW Phase One Championship (1 time)
- Bloody Rage American Wrestling League
  - BRAWL World Heavyweight Championship (1 time, final)
- STAR Pro Wrestling
  - STAR Heavyweight Championship (1 time)
- Twin States Wrestling
  - TSW Twin States Championship (1 time, final)
- GTS wrestling / Grims toy show.
  - GTS Championship (1 time)
  - GTS Tag Team Championship (1 time) – with Gaby Gilbert
  - GTS United States Championship (1 time)

== See also ==
- List of premature professional wrestling deaths
