= Rock 'n' Rave Infection =

Professional wrestling tag team

Statistics
- Members: Lance Rock; Jimmy Rave; Christy Hemme
- Name(s): Lance Hoyt and Jimmy Rave; Monsters of Rock; Rock 'n' Rave Infection
- Billed heights: Lance Hoyt 6'9 (2.03 m); Jimmy Rave 6'0 (1.83 m)
- Combined billed weight: 471 Ibs (213 kg)
- Debut: 2007

The Rock 'n' Rave Infection was an American professional wrestling tag team consisting of Lance Rock, Jimmy Rave, and managed by Christy Hemme.

== History ==
=== 2007 ===
Lance Hoyt and Jimmy Rave made their debut as a team at No Surrender in the tag team gauntlet. On the following episode of iMPACT! Hoyt and Rave, accompanied by Christy Hemme (Hoyt's on screen girlfriend at the time), made their impact debut as a team. They wrestled regularly but continued losing. Hemme quickly grew tired of the losses and began complaining. The rift within the team continued to develop until Hemme claimed during an interview segment that she heard Rave call her a "red snapper". Rave insisted he was talking about fishing but Hemme thought otherwise telling Hoyt to "make him get lost", to which Hoyt said "Jimmy's my boy, and you're gonna have to deal with it." Hemme replied by saying "Your getting nothing tonight, NOTHING!". It was during this interview that Rave first referred to the team of himself and Hoyt as "The Rock 'n' Rave Infection", which initially provoked an annoyed response from Hemme. There have been no problems with the trio since Rave and Rock accompanied Hemme to a match against Awesome Kong.

On the November 15, 2007 episode of iMPACT! the team scored their first major victory by upsetting LAX with help from Hemme, who was attacked after the match by a member of the "Latino Nation". Hoyt and Rave began feuding with LAX and Hemme continued to be harassed or attacked by the masked member of LAX. Hemme threatened to sue (kayfabe) TNA Management for male on female harassment.

=== 2008 ===
On the first Impact! of 2008, TNA held gauntlets to determine the rankings of their divisions. In the tag team division, Hoyt and Rave were ranked number five and VKM were ranked number four, so one member from each team started the match. A member from Team 3D came out next, followed by someone from the Motor City Machine Guns and someone from LAX. Near the end of the match the two teams left were Motor City Machine Guns and The Rock 'n Rave Infection. The Motor City Machine Guns won the match so Hoyt and Rave were ranked number two in the division. At the Final Resolution pay-per-view, the teams ended their feud in a match won by LAX. After the match the mystery Latino Nation attacker low-blowed Hoyt and then unveiled herself as a woman named Salinas, therefore showing why they were not threatened by the lawsuit.

After the LAX feud ended, the trio of Rave, Hoyt and Hemme developed a rock band gimmick, bringing out Guitar Hero game controllers to the ring, with Hemme acting like a frontwoman. They defeated other teams for the next few weeks, until they began feuding with the Motor City Machine Guns, losing three consecutive matches. On the April 3, 2008 edition of Impact! they participated in an eight-man tag team match against LAX and the Motor City Machine Guns. Hoyt and Rave were paired with Rellik and Black Reign and were called "The Monsters of Rock" in a backstage interview segment. "The Monsters of Rock" lost but then attacked the members of the winning team. Kaz intervened to try to stop the attack, but he was also attacked, which led to Super Eric entering the ring and stopping the attack. On May 1, 2008, they were eliminated from the Deuces Wild Tag Team Tournament in a first-round loss to A.J. Styles and Super Eric. The following week, Jimmy Rave defeated Curry Man in a six-man X division match. On the July 7, 2008 edition of Impact!, Hoyt changed his ring name to Lance Rock to give meaning to the team name hence Lance Rock and Jimmy Rave (Rock 'n Rave Infection) and both he and Rave defeated Matt Morgan.

On the October 16, 2008 edition of Impact!, Rock and Rave were attacked by Kurt Angle and were sent to the hospital. As Hemme attempted to leave the building and go to the hospital, The Beautiful People and Cute Kip confronted and insulted her, which led to the trio attacking her and performing the brown paper bag treatment on her. Hemme completed her face turn by defeating Velvet Sky on the October 23, 2008 edition of Impact!. Rave remained a heel in his subsequent matches while Rock was not featured on television. The team then participated in the "Feast or Fired" match at Final Resolution, but were unsuccessful in obtaining one of the four Feast or Fired briefcases. Soon afterwards, Hemme quietly separated from the team, turned face and became a singles wrestler as she began feuding with Knockout Champion Awesome Kong for the title.

On February 10, 2009, Rock was released from his contract and only one day later, Rave was also released. On February 26, 2009, Rock and Rave made their last appearance as a team on TNA when they accepted Beer Money, Inc.'s "Off the Wagon Challenge" for the TNA World Tag Team titles. The match ended when Roode pinned Rock, who then as per stipulation was forced out of TNA for good.
