= Lethal Consequences =

Professional wrestling tag team

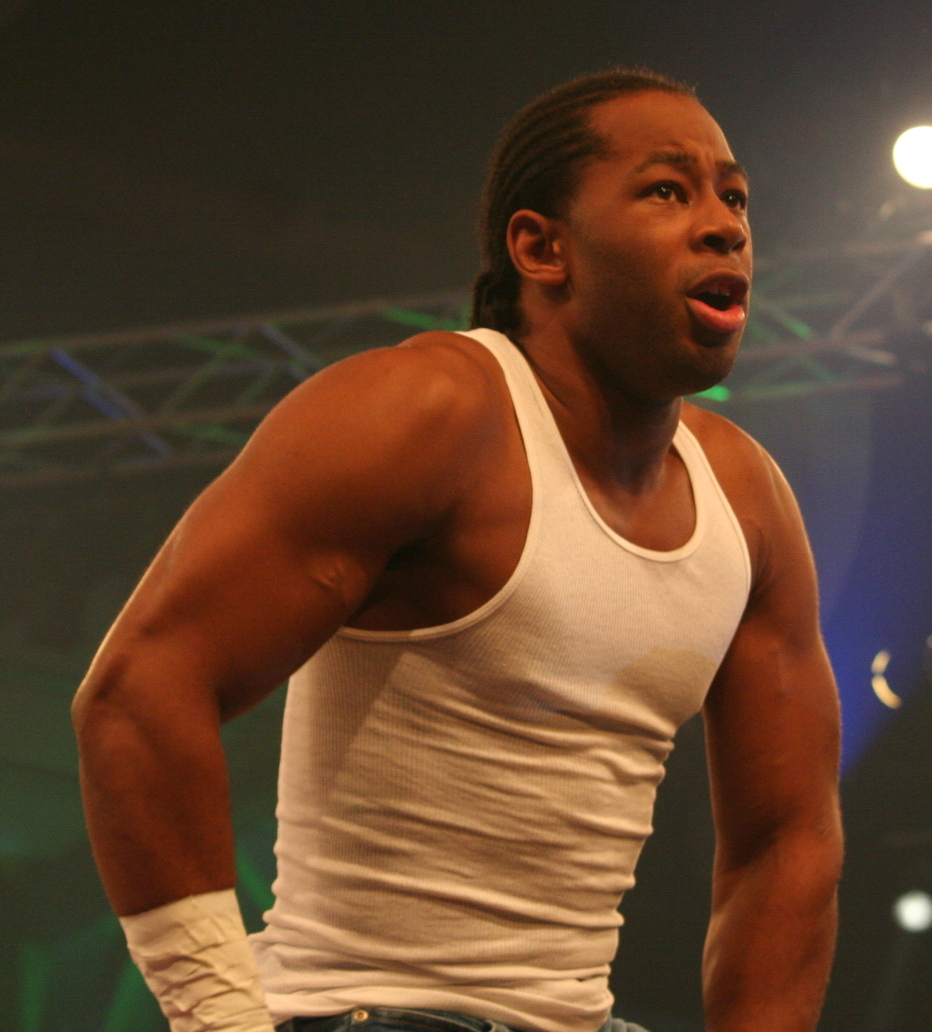
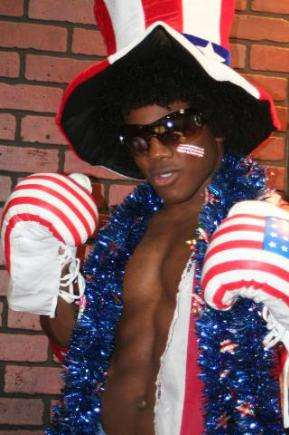
- Jay Lethal on the left and Consequences Creed to the right.

Statistics
- Members: Jay Lethal; Consequences Creed
- Name(s): Lethal Consequences; Jay Lethal & Consequences Creed
- Billed heights: Lethal: 5 ft 10 in (1.78 m); Creed: 5 ft 10 in (1.78 m)
- Combined billed weight: Combined: 415 lb (188 kg); Lethal: 210 lb (95 kg) & Creed:205 lb (93 kg)
- Debut: August 7, 2008
- Disbanded: March 29, 2010
- Years active: 2008–2010

Lethal Consequences was a professional wrestling tag team in Total Nonstop Action Wrestling (TNA). The team consisted of Jay Lethal and Consequences Creed. The team name was a portmanteau of the ring names of Lethal and Creed.

== History ==
=== Formation (2008) ===
Jay Lethal and Consequences Creed were both wrestling in Total Nonstop Action Wrestling (TNA)'s X Division in the summer of 2008. They began teaming with each other, during that same time. They first teamed on August 7, 2008, edition of Impact!, defeating the Motor City Machineguns (Chris Sabin and Alex Shelley).

=== TNA Front Line; World Tag Team Champions (2009) ===
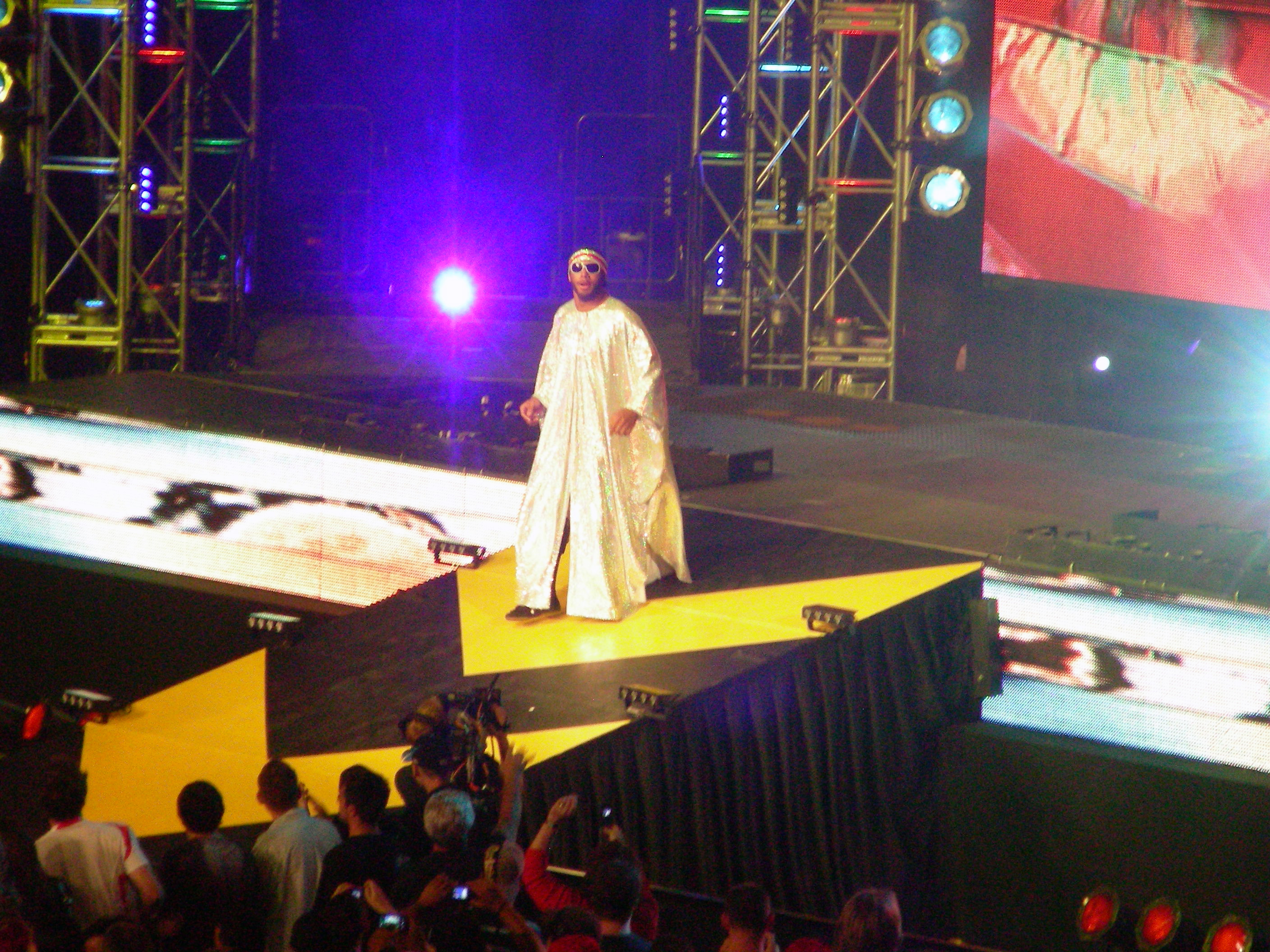
Lethal as Black Machismo at Slammiversary.

The two did not properly team, until November 2008, when a heroic group called The TNA Front Line was formed to oppose Main Event Mafia, a villainous group. Lethal and Creed joined Front Line and became a permanent tag team. The team was initially known simply by their ring names. At Final Resolution in December 2008, Lethal won one of the Feast or Fired briefcases in the Feast or Fired match. The briefcase contained a TNA World Tag Team Championship shot. On January 8, 2009, episode of Impact!, Lethal cashed in his title shot, by teaming with his tag team partner, Creed. They were booked to defeat the champions Beer Money, Inc. (Robert Roode and James Storm) for the TNA Tag Team Titles; this episode however taped on December 16, 2008. At Genesis, they lost the titles back to Beer Money in a 3-Way Dance, also involving Matt Morgan and Abyss.

During this time, Motor City Machineguns left Frontline, beginning a feud between with the newly renamed "Lethal Consequences" and Machineguns. On February 5 episode of Impact!, Lethal Consequences had a match with Machineguns. During Creed's entrance, he was attacked by Beer Money, causing him to be replaced by Eric Young, with whom Lethal won the match. At Against All Odds, Beer Money defeated Lethal Consequences to retain the TNA World Tag Team Championship, due to Creed's shoulder injury.

=== Feud with Suicide and Dissolution (2009–2010) ===
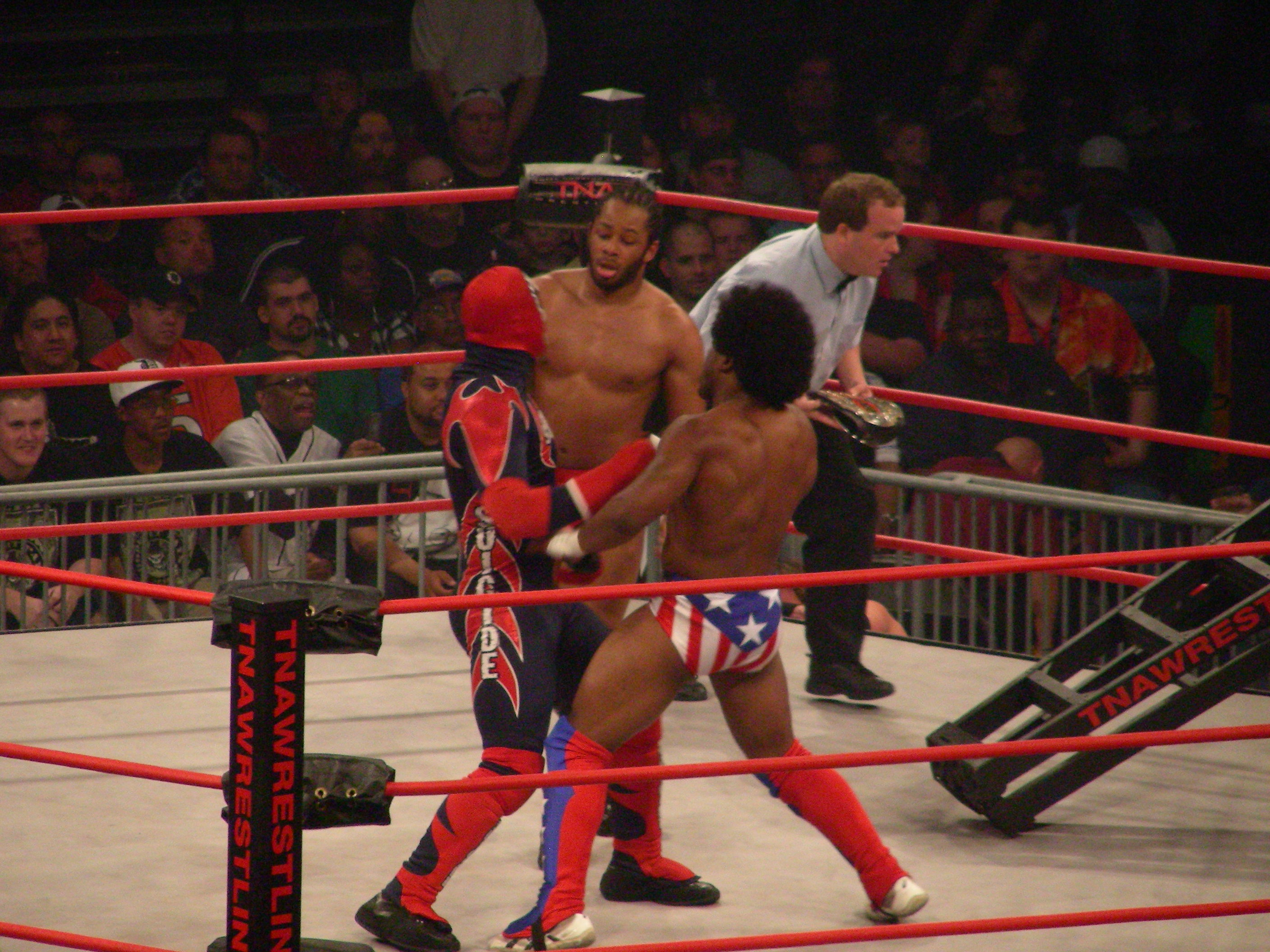
Creed and Lethal wrestling Suicide in an X Division King of the Mountain match at Slammiversary.

In March 2009, Lethal Consequences and Machineguns continued their rivalry, as they exchanged victories in tag matches. They would also battle for the latter team's one half, Alex Shelley's TNA X Division Championship, which would be won by Suicide. Suicide successfully retained the X Division Title against both teams in an Ultimate X match at Destination X, an Xscape match at Lockdown and a King of the Mountain match at Slammiversary. For the rest of the year through early 2010, Lethal and Creed became tag team and X-division jobbers, losing to teams like the Motor City Machine Guns and X-division matches involving many competitors. Creed was released from TNA Wrestling on March 29, 2010, marking the end of Lethal Consequences.

== Championships and accomplishments ==
- Total Nonstop Action Wrestling
  - TNA World Tag Team Championship (1 time)
