= Suicide (wrestling) =

Professional wrestling gimmick

- TNA Wrestling character
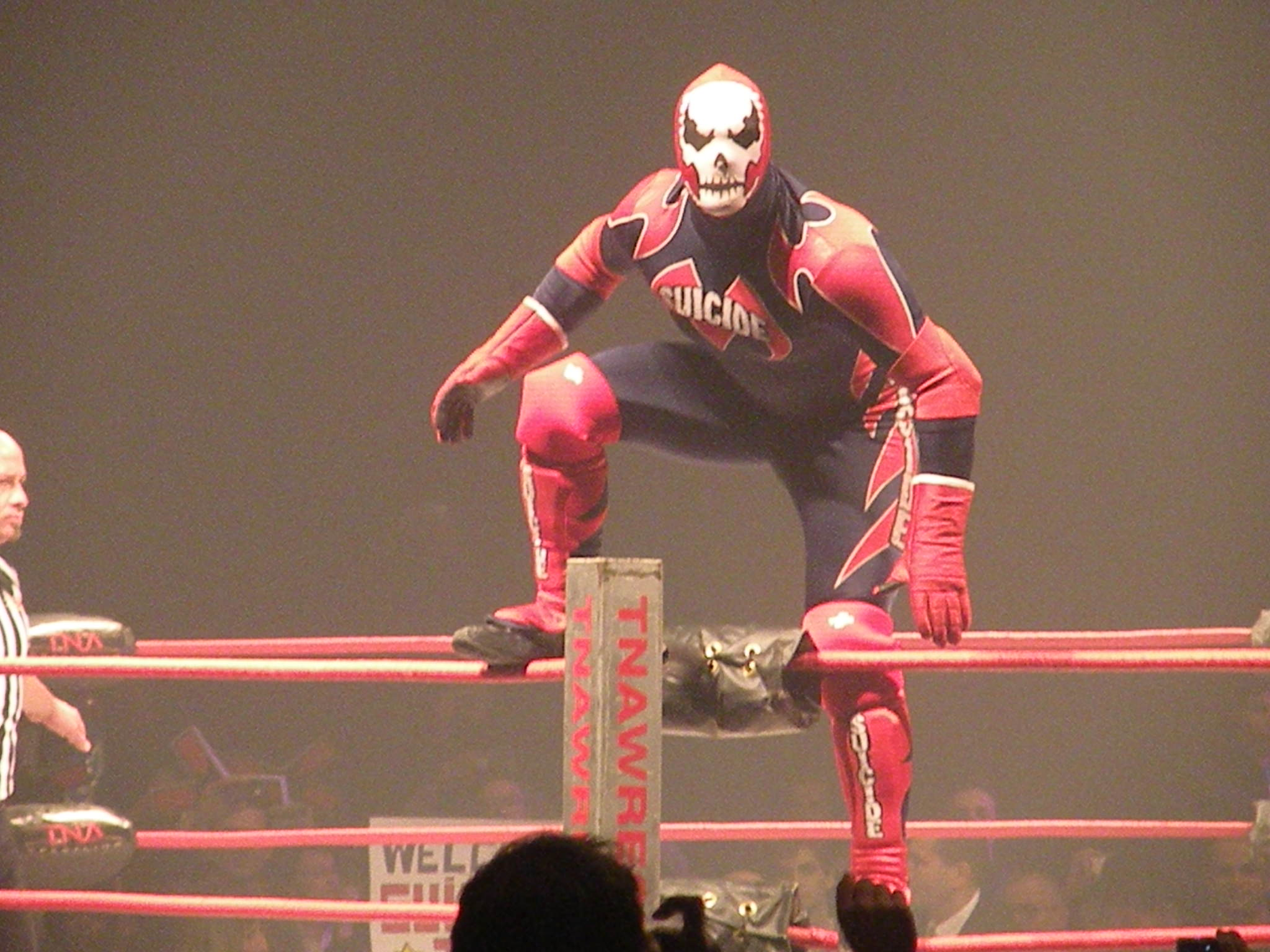
- Suicide in 2010
- First appearance: Video Games: TNA Impact! (2008); Real life: Final Resolution (2008)
- Last appearance: Video Games: TNA Impact! (2008); Real life: TNA Impact! (2020) (Note: Caleb Konley continues to portray Suicide on the independent circuit in an unofficial capacity.)
- Created by: TNA Wrestling
- Portrayed by: Frankie Kazarian; Christopher Daniels; Akira Raijin; Kazuchika Okada; Austin Aries; T.J. Perkins; Jonathan Gresham; Caleb Konley; Zachary Wentz; Crazzy Steve

In-universe information
- Alias: Manik
- Height: Various
- Weight: Various

Suicide is a professional wrestling persona, used by multiple wrestlers in Total Nonstop Action Wrestling (TNA). Suicide first appeared as a character in the 2008 video game TNA Impact!. In December 2008, the Suicide character was introduced on television as a real-life wrestler. Originally portrayed by Frankie Kazarian, Christopher Daniels held the role for a time in early 2009 and went on to win the X Division Championship. In June 2010, Kiyoshi became the third man to use the gimmick.

By October 2010, the gimmick was dropped, but made a brief return in January 2011, once again being portrayed by Christopher Daniels, before being dropped once again in April 2011. Suicide returned to television in May 2013 portrayed by T. J. Perkins. Austin Aries wrestled under the Suicide gimmick on the episode of Impact Wrestling which aired on June 27, 2013, and won the TNA X Division Championship. Suicide was "revealed" to be Perkins, who claimed Aries stole his ring gear, on the June 30, 2013, episode of Impact Wrestling. His ring name was changed to Manik, using a slightly altered version of the Suicide gear, with new music. Perkins remains the only man to have wrestled under the Manik persona.

The Suicide persona returned in July 2016 for TNA One Night Only X-Travaganza 2016, portrayed by Jonathan Gresham. In March 2017, Caleb Konley became the man behind the mask.

== History ==
=== Introduction as a video game character ===
Suicide was originally created by Midway Games as an original character for the 2008 TNA Impact! video game. The character is voiced by Low Ki, who also did motion capture for the game and appears as himself.

In the game's storyline he is a professional wrestler moving up the ranks, when prior to his match for the TNA World Heavyweight Championship, he is approached by The Latin American Xchange, who tell him to throw the match. When he instead goes on to win the title, he is beaten beyond recognition by LAX and left for dead in Mexico. Doctors find him alive, but suffering from amnesia, and aid in his recovery while offering free plastic surgery as well. This allows the player to create their own look for Suicide, establishing his new identity in the process. Finding he has a knack for wrestling, he is recruited for the TNA roster as Suicide, and forms a tag team with Eric Young called the Salty Biscuits. LAX kidnaps Young and orders Suicide to win the TNA World Heavyweight Championship then drop the title to Jeff Jarrett. After winning the title Suicide remembers his past, saves Young with the help of other wrestlers, and gets revenge on Jarrett by defeating him in the match for the World Heavyweight Championship.

=== Wrestling Debut and X Division Champion (2008–2011) ===
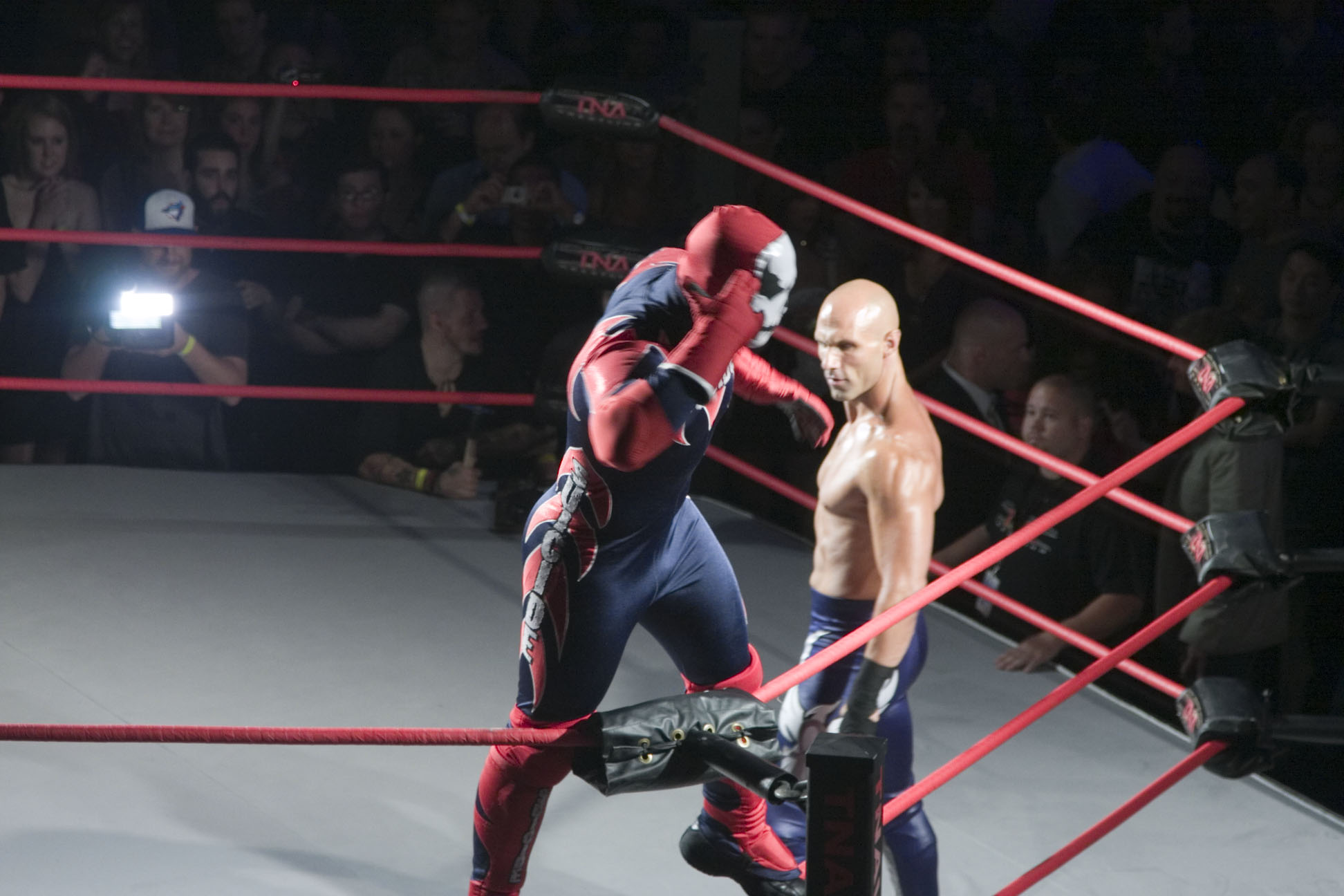
Suicide (portrayed by Kazarian) posing above Daniels, who once used the gimmick.

During every episode of TNA's primary television program, Impact!, after August 14, 2008, the words "whoissuicide.com" flashed on the screen for less than a second. On the website, it showed that Suicide was being taken from the game to real life television. At Final Resolution, Suicide made his debut by attacking Chris Sabin and Alex Shelley, the Motor City Machine Guns. At Destination X, Christopher Daniels won the X Division Championship in an Ultimate X match, while using the Suicide gimmick, having replaced the injured Frankie Kazarian. On the May 14, 2009, episode of TNA, after weeks of accusing Daniels of being Suicide, the Motor City Machine Guns and Lethal Consequences (Jay Lethal and Consequences Creed) looked to remove the mask of Suicide. This prompted Daniels to come out and save Suicide from being exposed. Suicide wrestled Daniels at the Sacrifice pay-per-view event, in which Suicide retained via time limit draw after Daniels refused a victory assisted by the Motor City Machine Guns.

At Slammiversary, Suicide retained the X Division Championship against Shelley, Sabin, Lethal, and Creed in a King of the Mountain match. On July 16, Suicide lost his championship to Homicide after he cashed in his "Feast or Fired" briefcase. After not being seen for a few weeks, Suicide made his return at Hard Justice to compete in the Steel Asylum match, which he lost because of D'Angelo Dinero. On the August 20 edition of Impact! Suicide attacked Dinero after his match with Consequences Creed. On the September 17 edition of Impact! Dinero defeated Suicide in a grudge match. At No Surrender Dinero defeated Suicide again, this time in a Falls Count Anywhere match. The following week on Impact! Suicide finally defeated Dinero, by doing the Suicide Solution on a trash can in a street fight. On the October 15 edition of Impact! Homicide stole Suicide's costume and claims to now know his true identity. On the December 3 edition Impact! Suicide made peace with Dinero and joined him, Matt Morgan and Hernandez in their war with Rhino, Team 3D and Jesse Neal. At Final Resolution Morgan, Hernandez, Dinero and Suicide defeated Neal, Team 3D and Rhino in an eight-man elimination tag team match.

On the February 18, 2010, edition of Impact! Kazarian returned to TNA, and would no longer use the Suicide gimmick. The character made its return four months later on June 14, losing to Magnus in a match taped for Xplosion. This time it was portrayed by Japanese wrestler Akira Kawabata, known in TNA as Kiyoshi. At the July 12 tapings of Xplosion, Kawabata picked up his first victory as Suicide, defeating Eric Young. The gimmick was temporarily retired after a house show in Windsor, Ontario on September 12, 2010, where he was defeated by Kazarian, which was followed by Kawabata returning to television as Kiyoshi on October 8 and the removal of Suicide's profile from TNA's official website on October 13. Suicide returned at the January 31, 2011, tapings of Xplosion, with Christopher Daniels once again using the gimmick. On the April 7 edition of Impact!, Suicide teamed with Brian Kendrick and Chris Sabin against Robbie E. and Generation Me (better known as The Young Bucks). For this night only, Suicide was portrayed by Kazuchika Okada, who would depart the company later that year. Suicide wrestled his final match on the May 12 edition of Impact!, where he was defeated by Sangriento. Suicide's final appearance was at TNA Destination X 2011, where he was featured in a backstage segment with Eric Young.

=== Name change and The Revolution (2013–2016) ===
After nearly two years of inactivity, vignettes began airing for Suicide's return to TNA on May 9, 2013. Suicide made his official return defeating Joey Ryan and Petey Williams on the May 23 episode of Impact Wrestling earning an X Division Title shot at Slammiversary. For this return, Suicide was portrayed by T. J. Perkins. Suicide received his title shot on June 2 at Slammiversary XI, but was defeated by Chris Sabin in an Ultimate X match, also involving Kenny King. On the June 27 episode of Impact Wrestling, Perkins was revealed as the man behind the mask of Suicide as part of a storyline where he had been attacked and the Suicide costume and mask stolen and utilized by Austin Aries to win the X Division Championship.

On June 29, at the tapings of the July 4 episode of Impact Wrestling, Perkins began using the ring name Manik, while retaining a modified version of the Suicide costume and mask. He participated in a three-way match for the X Division Championship against Sabin and Aries, which Sabin won to regain the championship; Manik was removed from the match after being attacked by Aces & Eights. After Sabin vacated the championship, Manik entered the tournament to determine the new champion, and advanced to the final by defeating Chavo Guerrero Jr. and Kenny King. On July 18, at the tapings of the July 25 episode of Impact Wrestling, Manik won the vacant X Division Championship by defeating Greg Marasciuolo and Sonjay Dutt in a three-way Ultimate X match. Including a successful defense against Chris Sabin on the September 26 episode of Impact Wrestling, Manik held the championship until Bound for Glory on October 20, when he lost it to Sabin in a five-way Ultimate X match. Following a hiatus lasting several months, Manik returned to the promotion at Lockdown losing to Tigre Uno in a steel cage match.

On September 3, Manik was kidnapped by James Storm and Sanada; the following week, Storm was shown initiating Manik into a new faction, later called The Revolution, and the trio later attacked Samoa Joe and Homicide. On a September 23, 2015 episode of Impact Wrestling Manik quit The Revolution and took his mask off revealing his face on TNA for the first time since debuting as Manik. On January 12, 2016, T. J. Perkins was released from TNA, removing the character from TV.

In July 2016, the Suicide character was brought back for a TNA One Night Only X-Travaganza 2016 taping, this time being portrayed by independent wrestler Jonathan Gresham.

=== Return (2017–2021) ===
In March 2017, Impact announced that Suicide would be returning on March 16 episode of Impact Wrestling. Suicide returned on March 16 Impact Wrestling, now being portrayed by Caleb Konley, in a four-way match for the X Division Championship, in which he was unsuccessful. The character went on a hiatus, due to the departure of Caleb Konley on March 1, 2019.

The Suicide character made its return to Impact Wrestling on March 24, 2020, attacking Moose after his match against Chase Stevens, with Caleb Konley using the gimmick once again. On March 31, 2020, at the Total Nonstop Action Wrestling Special! event, T. J. Perkins returned as Manik teaming with Suicide defeating the tag team of TNA Originals Johnny Swinger and Kid Kash. On May 19, 2020, Suicide unsuccessfully challenged Moose for the TNA World Heavyweight Championship.

On the August 12, 2021, episode of Impact!, Suicide made his final appearance competing in a number one contenders battle royal for the Impact World Championship which was won by Brian Myers. After Konley announced his departure from Impact Wrestling on April 14, 2022, the Suicide gimmick was once again dropped.

=== Target Wrestling (2024) ===
On October 19, 2024, Caleb Konley wrestled for Target Wrestling in Cumbria, England, reviving the Suicide character in a match against Mark Hendry. Konley then went on to compete without the mask later in the night, defending the JCW American Championship.

=== Juggalo Championship Wrestling (2025-present) ===
On September 11, 2025 Caleb Konley once again revived the Suicide character on a live broadcast of Juggalo Championship Wrestling's weekly show Lunacy from Dallas, Texas where he teamed up with Luigi Primo and Cocaine to take on the St. Claire Monster Corporation (Painful Paul, Kongo Kong, and Mr. Happy).

== Wrestlers who have portrayed Suicide ==
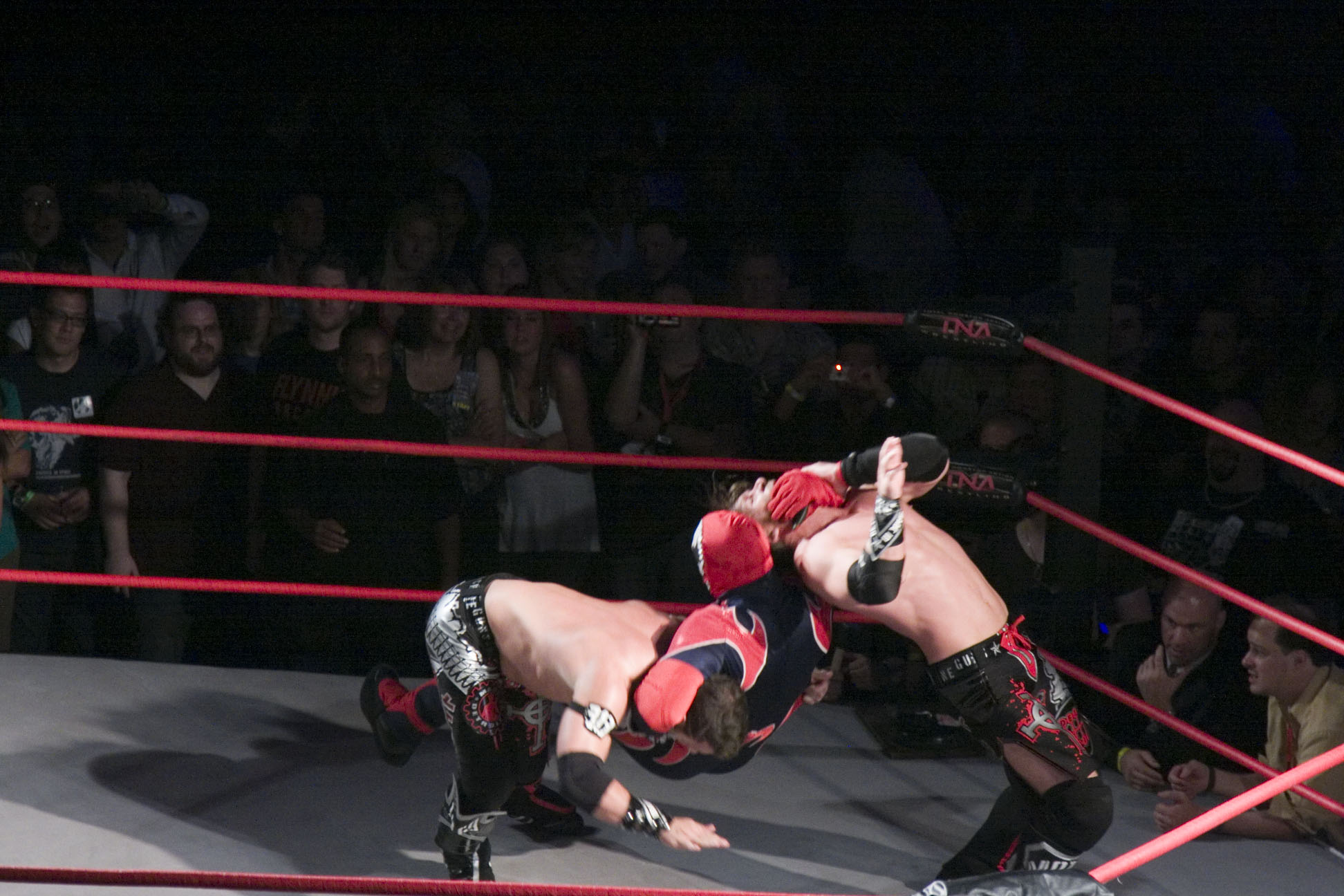
Suicide performing a simultaneous neckbreaker/DDT combination on The Motor City Machine Guns.

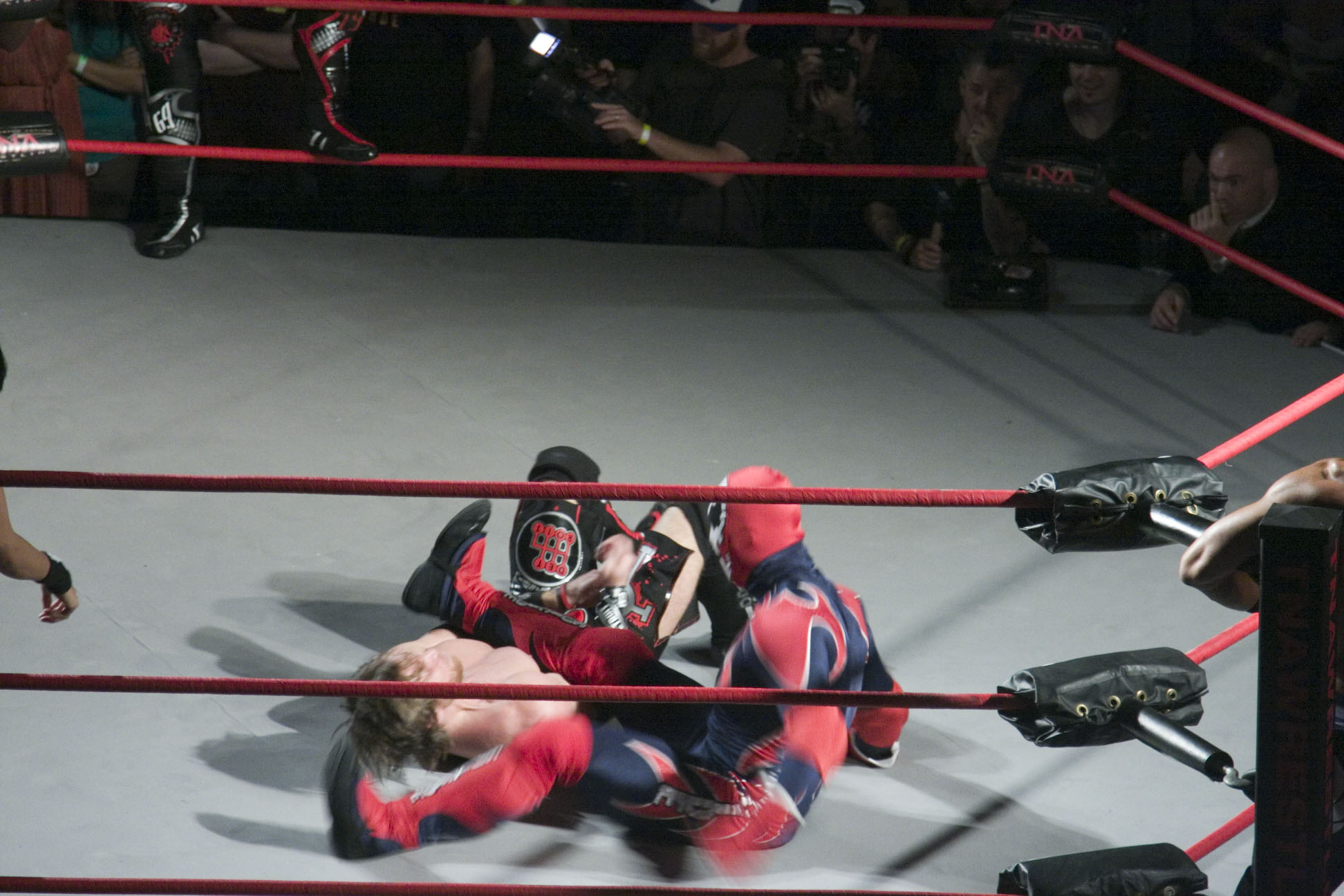
Suicide performing a leg drop on Chris Sabin.

Low Ki provided the voice and motion-capture for the character in the TNA Impact! video game.

Wrestler(s)	Years	Notes
Frankie Kazarian	2008–2010	Portrayed Suicide with Christopher Daniels
Christopher Daniels	2009; 2011	Portrayed Suicide with Frankie Kazarian
Akira Raijin	2010	Portrayed the character for only three months
Kazuchika Okada	2011	Portrayed the character for one night only
T. J. Perkins	2013–2016	Portrayed the character under the Manik name
Jonathan Gresham	2016	Portrayed the character for one night only, during TNA One Night Only X-Travaganza 2016
Kaleb Konley	2017–2021	Became the longest running performer to portray the Suicide character for a total of four years
Zachary Wentz	2020	Portrayed the character for a brief period

On the June 27, 2013, edition of Impact Wrestling, Austin Aries stole the costume in order to win the X Division Championship in order to use "Option C" at that year's Destination X.

On the November 24, 2020, episode of Impact!, Crazzy Steve disguised himself as Suicide and defeated Rohit Raju to get a shot at his X Division Championship, but lost the following week.

== Championships and accomplishments ==
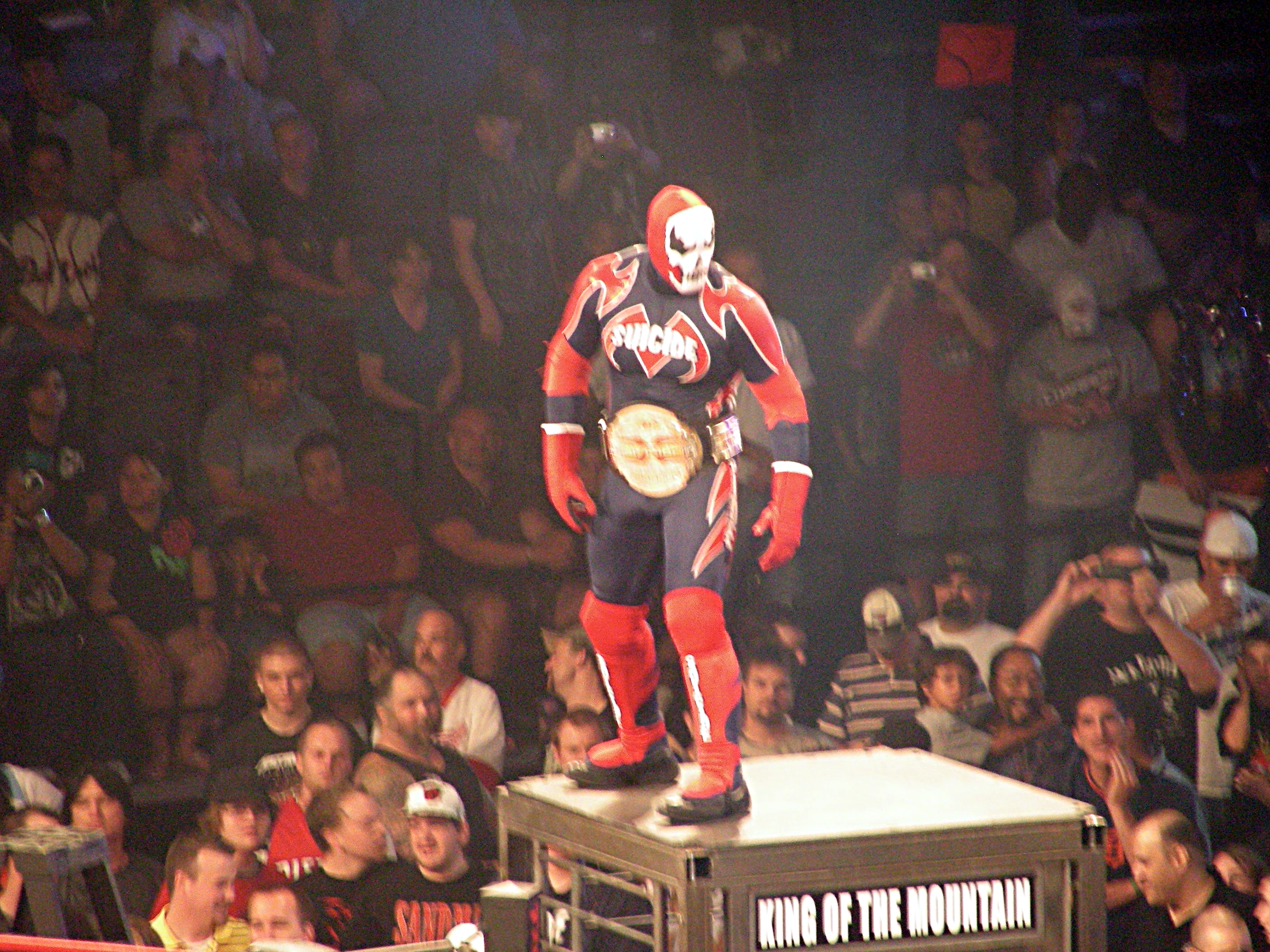
Suicide during his first reign as X Division Champion.

- Total Nonstop Action Wrestling
  - TNA X Division Championship (2 times) (Note: During the first reign Daniels and Kazarian won the title under the Suicide name and Perkins won the title under the Manik name during the second reign.)
  - TNA X Division Championship Tournament (2013)
  - X Division King of the Mountain (2009)
