= TNA Against All Odds (2009) =

2009 Total Nonstop Action Wrestling pay-per-view event

Against All Odds (2009)
- Promotional poster featuring The TNA Frontline
- Promotion: Total Nonstop Action Wrestling
- Date: February 8, 2009
- City: Orlando, Florida
- Venue: TNA Impact! Zone
- Attendance: 1,100
- Tagline(s): "Power Concedes Nothing Without a Fight"

Pay-per-view chronology
← Previous; Genesis	Next → Destination X

Against All Odds chronology
← Previous; 2008	Next → 2010

The 2009 Against All Odds was a professional wrestling pay-per-view (PPV) event produced by Total Nonstop Action Wrestling (TNA), which took place on February 8, 2009, at the TNA Impact! Zone in Orlando, Florida. It was TNA's first PPV event broadcast in High-Definition and the fifth event under the Against All Odds chronology.

In October 2017, with the launch of the Global Wrestling Network, the event became available to stream on demand.

== Storylines ==
Other on-screen personnel
Role:	Name:
Commentator	Mike Tenay
Commentator	Don West
Interviewer	Jeremy Borash
Interviewer	Lauren Thompson
Ring announcer	Jeremy Borash
Ring announcer	David Penzer
Referee	Earl Hebner
Referee	Rudy Charles
Referee	Mark Johnson
Referee	Andrew Thomas

Against All Odds featured eight professional wrestling matches that involved different wrestlers from pre-existing scripted feuds and storylines. Wrestlers portrayed villains, heroes, or less distinguishable characters in the scripted events that built tension and culminated in a wrestling match or series of matches.

== Results ==
No.	Results	Stipulations	Times
1	Alex Shelley (c) defeated Eric Young	Singles match for the TNA X Division Championship	13:01
2	Scott Steiner defeated Petey Williams	Singles match	11:17
3	Brutus Magnus defeated Chris Sabin	Singles match	06:38
4	Awesome Kong (c) defeated ODB	Singles match for the TNA Women's Knockout Championship	05:39
5	Booker T (c) (with Sharmell) defeated Shane Sewell	Singles match for the TNA Legends Championship	06:01
6	Abyss defeated Matt Morgan	Singles match	15:37
7	Beer Money, Inc. (James Storm and Robert Roode) (c) (with Jacqueline) defeated Lethal Consequences (Consequences Creed and Jay Lethal)	Tag team match for the TNA World Tag Team Championship	15:41
8	Sting (c) defeated Brother Devon, Brother Ray and Kurt Angle	Fatal 4-Way match for the TNA World Heavyweight Championship	14:34
(c) / – the champion(s) heading into the match

== See also ==
- 2009 in professional wrestling
