= Jay Lethal =

American professional wrestler (born 1985)

- Lethal at Death Before Dishonor 2026

Personal information
- Born: Jamar Shipman; April 29, 1985 (age 41) Elizabeth, New Jersey, U.S.

Professional wrestling career
- Ring name(s): Black Machismo; Hydro; Jamar Cunningham; Jay Lethal; J.R. Lethal; RPM; El Lethál
- Billed height: 5 ft 10 in (1.78 m)
- Billed weight: 225 lb (102 kg)
- Billed from: Elizabeth, New Jersey
- Trained by: Dan Maff; Jersey All Pro Wrestling; Mikey Whipwreck; Christian Dittmann
- Debut: December 7, 2001

Jamar Shipman (born April 29, 1985), better known by the ring name Jay Lethal, is an American professional wrestler. He is signed to All Elite Wrestling (AEW) and also appears on AEW’s sister promotion Ring of Honor (ROH), where he is the leader of The Lethal Twist and one-third of the ROH World Six-Man Tag Team Champions with fellow stablemates Blake Christian and Lee Johnson. He also makes appearances on the independent circuit.

Dubbed "The Franchise" of Ring of Honor, Lethal is a two-time ROH World Champion, and holds the record for most combined title defences with the ROH World Championship in company history. He was also a record-setting two-time and the second longest reigning, ROH World Television Champion, holding the title for 567 days. Lethal is the only man to hold the World Television Championship and the World Championship at the same time, and also a former ROH World Tag Team Champion with Jonathan Gresham. Lethal is recognized by ROH as a Grand Slam Champion, and is the only man to have held all five ROH men's championships (World, World Tag Team, World Six-Man Tag Team, World Television and Pure). In 2020, he was selected by Ring of Honor as their Wrestler of the Decade (2010s).

He is also known for his work with Total Nonstop Action Wrestling (TNA), where he was a six-time TNA X Division Champion, and a former TNA World Tag Team Champion with Consequences Creed as Lethal Consequences. Between ROH and TNA, Lethal has won 14 total championships.

== Early life ==
Jamar Shipman was born on April 29, 1985, in Elizabeth, New Jersey. He is the middle child of Ronald and Shirley Shipman, with two brothers and two sisters. In July 2001, aged 16, Shipman won a contest held by Jersey All Pro Wrestling (JAPW) which entitled the winner to a lifetime of free training in the JAPW professional wrestling school. He spent six months training there, at the end of which the school closed down. He then began training under Extreme Championship Wrestling (ECW) alumni Mikey Whipwreck and Dan Maff.

== Professional wrestling career ==
=== Jersey All Pro-Wrestling (2001–2009) ===
==== Debut and various title reigns (2001–2004) ====
Shipman made his wrestling debut under the ring name Jay Lethal on December 7, 2001, at JAPW's "Class Of 2001 Student Show", in a match where he defeated Dixie. He won his first Championship, the JAPW Television Championship, on September 13, 2002, in Bayonne, New Jersey, at Never Forget, defeating the champion, Ghost Shadow, and Rain in a three-way match. His reign lasted an unprecedented and unreplicated eleven months, with Lethal finally losing to Crazy Ivan on August 22, 2003, in Rahway, New Jersey at Counter-Strike. Lethal also held the JAPW Light Heavyweight Championship, defeating the champion, Azrieal, Insane Dragon and Jack Evans on February 28, 2004, at Revolution, in a four-way match. Azrieal tried to regain the title for eight months, but repeatedly lost to Lethal. On December 10, 2004, at Seasons Beatings, Azrieal gained one more shot at the JAPW Light Heavyweight Championship by challenging Lethal to a "belt versus loser leaves town" match, which would see Azrieal leave JAPW if he lost. Azrieal was able to win the match, thus ending their lengthy feud.

==== JAPW Heavyweight Champion (2005–2009) ====
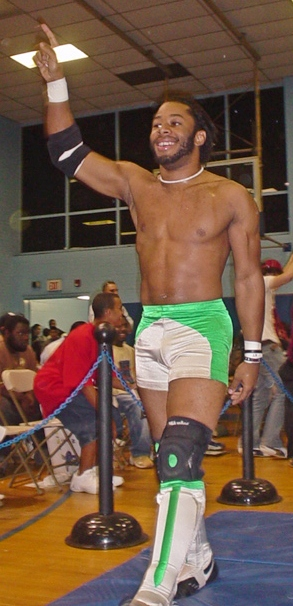
Lethal in 2005

With two lengthy title reigns in the space of two years, Lethal had established himself as a dominant member of the JAPW roster by 2005, and he began challenging for the JAPW Heavyweight Championship, which had been held by Dan Maff since December 2003. On January 29, 2005, at Wild Card, Lethal pinned Maff in a title match, but the decision was overturned by crooked referee Sean Hanson. In March 2005, Maff left JAPW and retired from wrestling following an argument with Homicide, thus vacating the JAPW Heavyweight Championship. Lethal was awarded the Heavyweight Championship on March 26 at Caged Fury 2 held in the ECW Arena in Philadelphia, Pennsylvania, but he refused to accept it, claiming that he wanted to "earn" the title. JAPW mainstay Homicide then challenged Lethal to an impromptu match for the vacant title, which Homicide won. Lethal finally won the JAPW Heavyweight Championship on May 21 in Braintree, Massachusetts, at Braintree Invasion defeating Homicide, Kevin Steen and Samoa Joe in a four-way match by pinning Homicide following a diving headbutt.

Lethal defeated Steve Corino on June 4 at HomeComing with his father in his corner, but, after the match, Corino and Ricky Landell handcuffed Lethal to the top rope and attacked his father with Corino placing him in a crossface. This led to a six-man tag match on July 16, at Gored pitting Lethal and his father against Corino, Landell and Landell's manager, Rick Silver. Lethal and his father were outnumbered, but managed to pull off a win at the last minute after Lethal's mother introduced their partner, the returning Charlie Haas. After Haas attacked Lethal during the post-match celebrations, a title match was booked between Haas and Lethal for Haas of Pain held on September 10, which was won by Lethal. On October 22 at 8th Year Anniversary Show Lethal ended his feud with Corino by defeating him for the title in a Dog Collar match with help from Tommy Dreamer.

Lethal's next feud would be with The D-Factor's Rhino, who, on November 12, 2005, at Fall Out, assaulted him following his successful title defense against B-Boy. On January 7, 2006, at Wild Card II, Lethal lost the JAPW Heavyweight Championship to Rhino, who won the bout after giving Lethal a Rhino Driver through a table from the top rope. Lethal tried twice to regain his title, first on February 18, 2006, in a three-way match which also included Teddy Hart, and then on May 20, 2006, but was unsuccessful both times at regaining the title. After unsuccessfully going after the JAPW Light Heavyweight Championship held by Frankie Kazarian, Lethal and former rival Azrieal managed to win the JAPW Tag Team Championship by defeating the champions The Outcast Killaz (Oman Tortuga and Diablo Santiago) and The S.A.T. (Jose and Joel Maximo) in a three-way dance on October 28, 2006, at 9th Year Anniversary Show, held in Rahway, New Jersey. On June 9, 2007, at Back to Business, The Latin American Xchange of Homicide and Hernandez defeated Lethal and Azrieal for the titles.

At the beginning of 2009 Lethal proclaimed that it was his destiny to win back the JAPW Heavyweight title, held by Kenny Omega. On February 28, 2009, in Jersey City, at Jersey City Rumble Lethal won a 21-person Jersey City Rumble to earn the right to challenge for Omega's title that same night. In the end, Lethal pinned Omega with the flipping release dragon suplex after Omega's associate Dan Maff turned on him, to win the JAPW Heavyweight Championship for the second time. During the match Maff had also attacked Lethal and that lead to a Championship match between the two on March 28, at Unfinished Business, in which Lethal managed to retain his title. Lethal defeated Maff again on April 18 at International Invasion, but only after Trent Acid interfered in the match. Their feud ended on June 27 in Jersey City, at Caged Destiny, when Maff defeated Lethal for the title inside a steel cage. Lethal has not made any appearances for JAPW since.

=== Ring of Honor (2003–2006) ===
==== Hydro (2003–2004) ====
Shipman made his Ring of Honor (ROH) debut as Hydro, a member of Special K on Revenge on the Prophecy held in West Mifflin, Pennsylvania, on January 11, 2003. On May 22, 2004, at Generation Next he faced Alex Shelley in a singles match. Though he lost, Shelley recognized his pure wrestling talent and offered him membership in Generation Next, Shelley's stable of future stars. Hydro declined, opting to remain part of Special K. Hydro won a four corner survival match at World Title Classic on June 12, which entitled him to enter the Pure Wrestling tournament later that year. At Survival of the Fittest on June 24, he and Dixie took part in a four-way tag match for the Tag Team Championship in a losing effort, as CM Punk single-handedly defended the title to allow his tag team partner and co-champion Colt Cabana to prepare for his match later that evening. Hydro then challenged Punk to an impromptu match, which Punk also won. Hydro shook hands before the match, thus following the "Code of Honor" (which Special K normally ignored).

==== Samoa Joe's protégé (2004–2005) ====
Hydro took part in the Pure Wrestling tournament on July 17, 2004, at Reborn: Completion. At the outset of the event, World Champion Samoa Joe advised Hydro to change his name and become more serious. Acting on Joe's advice, Hydro left Special K and went back to calling himself Jay Lethal. He was eliminated from the tournament after Doug Williams pinned him in a four-way match using the Chaos Theory.

At Testing the Limit on August 7, Lethal took part in a four-way match, pitting him against Alex Shelley, Ace Steel and 2 Cold Scorpio. Despite the moral support of his parents, who were in the audience, Lethal suffered a second loss to Shelley. Having rejected Shelley's offer of a place in Generation Next before the match for a second time, Lethal asked Shelley for a singles match. Lethal and Shelley faced one another for a third time on August 28 at Scramble Cage Melee, with Shelley cheating to gain a third victory. Having lost every match for months, Lethal was obliged to face Matt Stryker at Glory by Honor III on September 11 with his ROH career on the line. Lethal won, breaking his losing streak. Low Ki, who had been feuding with Samoa Joe for several months, challenged Lethal, as Joe's protégé, at The Midnight Express Reunion on October 2. In the course of the match, Low Ki's manager Julius Smokes harassed Lethal's parents (once again watching the match from the audience) and Low Ki spat at Lethal's mother. Low Ki easily defeated Lethal, then mocked him after the match.

Lethal lost to Chad Collyer at Gold on October 15, but recovered with a win over Delirious the next day at Joe vs. Punk II. He teamed with his mentor, Samoa Joe, and lost to R. J. Brewer and Nigel McGuinness at Weekend Of Thunder: Night One on November 5, before suffering another loss to The Embassy member Jimmy Rave the subsequent evening. After his match with Rave, Lethal attacked Prince Nana, the leader of The Embassy. This led to Nana recruiting several masked mercenaries (dubbed the "Weapons of Masked Destruction") in an attempt to end Lethal's career. Lethal defeated both WMDs at All-Star Extravaganza 2 on December 4 and Final Battle 2004 on December 26 respectively, in both cases ending the match with his signature flipping release dragon suplex.

Lethal's feud with The Embassy continued into 2005, and on February 19 at the Third Anniversary Celebration: Part One he pinned Embassy member Jimmy Rave to become number one contender to the Pure Championship. Pure Champion and Embassy member R. J. Brewer, who had control over when to wrestle his title matches, chose to have the title defense immediately after Lethal's match, defeating the exhausted Lethal to retain his title following a trifecta of Lung Blowers. Lethal was scheduled to face Walters for the title in a re-match at Trios Tournament 2005 on March 5 in Philadelphia, but was attacked by an unknown assailant backstage, resulting in Lethal's eye swelling shut. Despite the injury, Lethal went on to defeat Walters later that night to win the Pure Championship, his first title in ROH.

On March 12 at Back to Basics, Lethal and Samoa Joe teamed once again to face CM Punk and Spanky, with Lethal pinning Spanky with a bridging dragon suplex. At the Best of the American Super Juniors Tournament on April 2, Lethal and Joe faced Jimmy Jacobs and B. J. Whitmer for the vacant Tag Team Championship, but were defeated. Lethal retained his Pure Championship in a match with Spanky at Stalemate on April 16, but on May 7 at Manhattan Mayhem he lost the title to his mentor Samoa Joe. After the match, both men were ambushed after the match by The Rottweilers, who revealed Low Ki was the one who attacked Lethal at Trios Tournament 2005. This led to a tag match that same night pitting Lethal and Joe against Low Ki and fellow Rottweiler Homicide. The match ended when Homicide gave Lethal Da Cop Killa while Low Ki simultaneously delivered a Ghetto Stomp, driving Lethal's neck into the ground. Lethal was stretchered from the arena, wearing a neck brace, ostensibly seriously injured.

After being out "injured" for a month, Lethal returned on June 12 at The Future is Now to save James Gibson from a beating at the hands of The Rottweilers. He returned to the ring on June 18 at Death Before Dishonor III, where he faced Low Ki in a grudge match which was declared a no contest after both men were disqualified. At Sign of Dishonor on July 8, Lethal teamed with fellow former Special K member Dixie to defeat The Heartbreak Express. Later that evening, Mick Foley forced World Champion CM Punk, who had signed with World Wrestling Entertainment (WWE) and was trying to leave ROH with the World Championship, to defend his title against Lethal. Punk retained his title with a muscle buster/rear naked choke combination, often used by Samoa Joe, who had come ringside to cheer Lethal on.

Seeking revenge for the neck injury he had in May, Lethal challenged Homicide at Escape from New York on July 9, but lost due to Homicide using a chain. On July 23 at The Homecoming he joined forces with Samoa Joe and James Gibson to face The Rottweilers (Homicide, Low Ki and Ricky Reyes) but again suffered a defeat, with Homicide using the chain this time on Gibson. Lethal challenged Low Ki once more on August 12 at Redemption as part of his ongoing rivalry with The Rottweilers. The match ended in a draw after the enemies fought outside the ring and were counted out. After the match, Homicide came to the ring to attack Lethal, but was stopped by his opponent for the night, Matt Hardy. On August 13 at Punk: The Final Chapter, Lethal and Joe defeated Low Ki and Homicide by disqualification after Homicide hit an elbow drop to the referee. Afterwards the four men brawled all over the arena, with Low Ki Ghetto Stomping Lethal off the bleachers and ending with him giving Lethal the Ki Krusher in the middle of the ring.

At Glory by Honor IV on September 17, Lethal lost to Low Ki in a "Fight Without Honor". He went on to defeat Low Ki later that night, however, in a standard singles match to end their feud. He defeated Sal Rinauro to advance to the finals of the 2005 Survival of the Fittest tournament on September 24, but was eliminated by Roderick Strong.

==== Last feuds and departure (2005–2006) ====
After unsuccessfully challenging Nigel McGuinness for the Pure Championship on October 1, Lethal went undefeated until November 19, 2005, when he and Samoa Joe lost to Austin Aries and Roderick Strong in a number one contender's match for the Tag Team Championship. On December 3, 2005, at Steel Cage Warfare, Lethal wrestled Joe in an exhibition match. During the bout, Lethal turned heel by attacking Joe's knee with a chair and then pinned him with the flipping release dragon suplex.

On January 27, 2006, Lethal teamed with Bryan Danielson, losing to Austin Aries and Roderick Strong in a match for the Tag Team Championship. At the Fourth Anniversary Show on February 25, 2006, in Edison, New Jersey, Lethal lost cleanly to Samoa Joe to end their short-lived feud. He departed from the promotion following this, but subsequently returned three times for one-night appearances (working all matches as a face), losing to Pure Champion Nigel McGuinness on May 13, teaming with Colt Cabana on July 15 in a losing effort against Jimmy Rave and Sal Rinauro, and losing a four way survival match against Claudio Castagnoli, Christopher Daniels, and the match winner, Nigel McGuinness on August 5, 2006.

=== Total Nonstop Action Wrestling (2005–2011) ===
==== Pursuit of the X Division Championship (2005–2006) ====
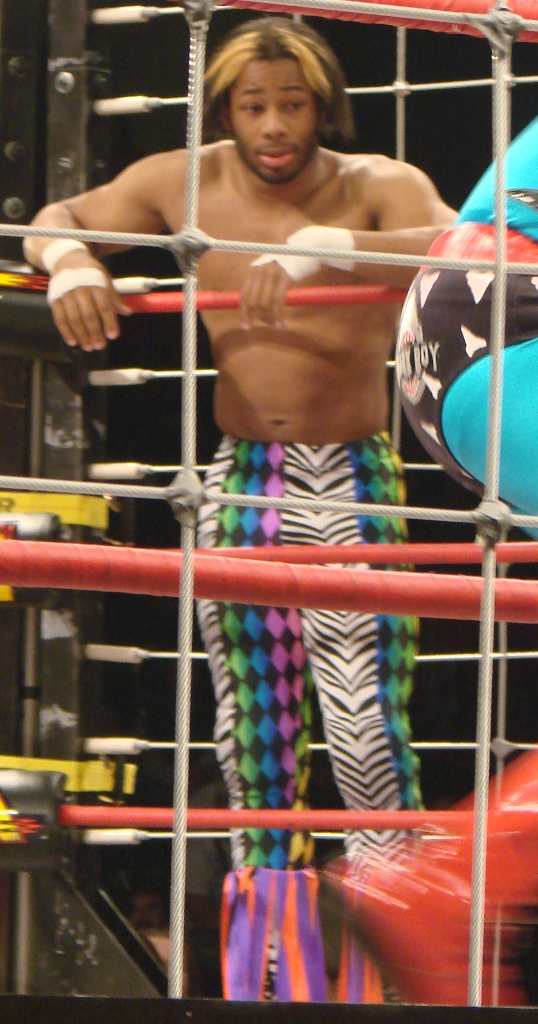
Lethal in 2007

While wrestling for JAPW, Lethal caught the eye of Total Nonstop Action Wrestling (TNA) producer and announcer Jeremy Borash, who offered him a spot in the TNA roster. Lethal debuted in TNA on the December 17, 2005 episode of Impact!, losing to X Division Champion and fellow ROH alum Samoa Joe. In January 2006, he was signed to a contract by TNA. He made his pay-per-view debut at Against All Odds in 2006 on February 12, defeating Matt Bentley, Alex Shelley and Petey Williams in a four-way match by pinning Williams.

On the February 18, 2006 episode of Impact!, Lethal defeated Roderick Strong and Shannon Moore to earn a spot in Team USA, the defending champions in the 2006 World X Cup. Other members of the team were Chris Sabin, Sonjay Dutt and Alex Shelley. Team USA wrestled their first match at Lockdown on April 23, 2006, where Lethal, Dutt and Shelley lost to Team Japan (Black Tiger, Minoru Tanaka and Hirooki Goto) after Black Tiger pinned Lethal with a Black Tiger suplex. On the April 27, 2006 episode of Impact!, Lethal unsuccessfully challenged Samoa Joe for the X Division Championship. On May 14 at Sacrifice Lethal participated in the World X Cup Gauntlet match, but ended up being the second to last man eliminated from the match by Team Mexico's Puma. The tournament ended on the following episode of Impact! with Chris Sabin defeating Team Canada's Petey Williams to win the World X Cup for Team USA.

In the June 1, 2006 episode of Impact!, Lethal scored a win over Alex Shelley, but was after the match attacked by his associate Kevin Nash, who had declared a war on the X Division in the aftermath of Team USA's World X Cup victory. During the July 13, 2006 episode, Lethal won the right to challenge for the title of his choosing by scoring the deciding fall in an eight-man "All or Nothing" tag team match, where he teamed with Rhino and Team 3D (Brother Ray and Brother Devon) against Team Canada (Petey Williams, Bobby Roode, Eric Young and A1). The next week, Lethal challenged Jeff Jarrett for the NWA World Heavyweight Championship, but was defeated following interference from Scott Steiner. Two weeks later, Lethal took part in a five way X Division match to determine the number one contender for the title. Although Petey Williams won the match, one week later Lethal was added to the match, making it a three-way match for the X Division title at Hard Justice involving Lethal, Williams and defending champion Senshi. Lethal was pinned by Senshi after Williams hit him with his Canadian Destroyer.

In a strong product placement, Lethal alongside Sonjay Dutt, got fellow X Division superstar Chris Sabin ready for his match at No Surrender by watching clips of Jackass Number Two, which was being heavily promoted by TNA at the time. One night on Impact!, during Chris Sabin's match with Alex Shelley, Shelley's partner Johnny Devine was pushed in a shopping cart and rammed into the steel post, allowing Sabin to pin Shelley. The following week, Lethal was able to defeat Petey Williams after Sabin and Dutt distracted the referee, allowing Lethal to roll a bowling ball into Petey's groin. Following in this storyline, Lethal went on to defeat Williams again on September 24, 2006, at the No Surrender pay-per-view, following Williams allegedly being given laxatives by stable mate Dutt, rendering him incapable of doing most of his moves, and giving Lethal the victory when Williams could no longer "hold it". He and Dutt were also involved in Sabin's match later in the night with similar antics involving a blow-up doll, but to no avail as Sabin would lose the match despite the interference. These, too, were designed as advertising for Jackass Number Two, as were other moments for Mortal Kombat: Armageddon.

==== Black Machismo (2006–2008) ====
Lethal in 2008

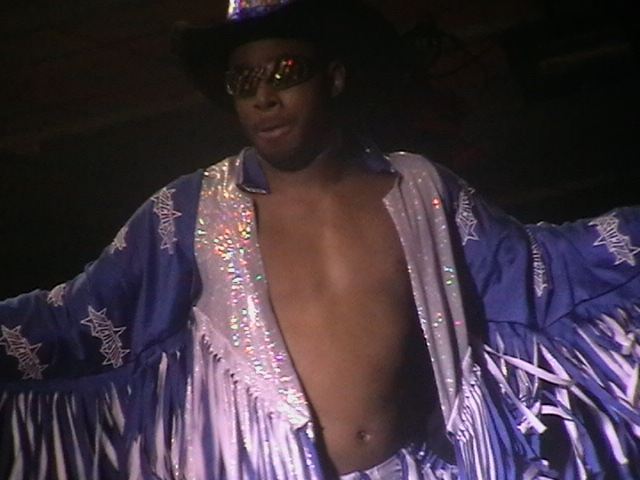
Lethal in his "Black Machismo" gimmick in 2009

Lethal as "Black Machismo" at Slammiversary in 2009

In December 2006, Kevin Nash recruited Lethal, Senshi, Austin Starr, Sonjay Dutt and Alex Shelley to compete in a tournament known as the Paparazzi Championship Series. The series included a push-up contest, musical chairs, Limbo contest, Texas Hold'em and a few others, although Lethal did not win the tournament. After the tournament, which concluded in January 2007, Lethal and Dutt continued appearing in Paparazzi segments with Nash and PCS winner Alex Shelley, with Nash promising to give Lethal and Dutt Extreme Makeovers to help advance their careers. The February 15 episode of Impact! included a segment named "Paparazzi Idol", a parody of American Idol. After Lethal's attempt to sing was disliked by the judges, judge Kevin Nash suggested that Lethal do an impression, to which Lethal responded with a spot-on impression of wrestling legend "Macho Man" Randy Savage. The April 5, 2007 episode of Impact! presented Lethal and Dutt with their new gimmicks; Lethal's new gimmick was impersonating Savage. The following week, Nash introduced Lethal, who was led to the ring by a remixed version of Savage's entrance theme "Pomp and Circumstance" and dressed in full "Macho Man" attire, as "Black Machismo" Jay Lethal. He imitated Savage's trademark catchphrase "Oh yeah!" and was able to defeat X Division Champion Chris Sabin using many of Savage's signature in-ring maneuvers and mannerisms, most notably his diving elbow drop finisher.

At the Lockdown pay-per-view on April 15, 2007, Lethal nearly won the X Division title from Sabin in a five-person Xscape match (five start the match in the cage; the first three eliminations are done by pinfall or submission; the final two must then try to escape the cage, with the first one to exit being declared the winner). Lethal and Sabin were both climbing over the same side of the cage, fighting as they went, and Sabin kicked Lethal's leg so that his leg went through the bars of the cage, trapping him there while Sabin jumped down and won the match. On the April 26 episode of Impact! Lethal and tag team partner, Sonjay Dutt, who had rejected Nash's idea for his new gimmick, won a shot at the X Division Championship held by Chris Sabin at Sacrifice. Dutt, however, was unhappy at Lethal getting the pinfall. After their loss to Sabin at Sacrifice, both Dutt and Lethal started brawling until Kevin Nash came out and separated the two until Dutt kicked Nash and stormed out of the ring visibly upset. On May 8, TNA Mobile announced that Randy Savage himself called Jay Lethal and said that he loved the "Black Machismo" character as the two spoke on the phone for several minutes. However, Lethal subsequently expressed doubt over whether he had really spoken with Savage as the Macho Man's trademark voice is easily imitated. At Slammiversary, Lethal defeated Chris Sabin in a singles match for the X Division Championship, his first title in TNA. Only days later, however, on the following Impact!, he lost the title to Samoa Joe after Chris Sabin was pinned, in a Match of Champions three-way qualifying match.

At Victory Road Lethal competed in an Ultimate X gauntlet match in a losing effort after Christopher Daniels retrieved the X. At Hard Justice Lethal and Sonjay Dutt, who had made peace with Lethal after coming up with the gimmick of a guru, defeated Triple X's Christopher Daniels and Senshi and The Motor City Machineguns (Alex Shelley and Chris Sabin) in a three-way tag match when Lethal pinned Daniels. This led to Jim Cornette booking a match on the August 16 episode of Impact! pitting Daniels versus Lethal with the winner becoming the number one contender to the X Division title, which Lethal would go on to win. As a result of that Lethal would go on to face Triple Crown champion Kurt Angle for the X Division title at No Surrender, where Lethal would beat Angle cleanly with a roll-up to win the X Division Championship for the second time.

At Genesis Lethal successfully defended his X Division Championship against his best friend, Sonjay Dutt, who during the match once again began showing signs of annoyance towards Lethal and his mannerisms. However, after the match Dutt made peace with Lethal, who then invited SoCal Val, TNA's ring girl, to the ring to celebrate the victory. The celebration was cut short by Team 3D (Brother Ray and Brother Devon), who were at the time feuding with the fan favorite-turned Motor City Machineguns, who beat down both Lethal and Dutt and left the arena with Lethal's Championship belt. 3D later declared a war on the entire X Division, claiming that its wrestlers were just "little boys" and that they needed to be toughened up. During the feud Johnny Devine turned on the X Division and joined Team 3D, often carrying Lethal's stolen belt around, before officially winning it in a Street Fight on the January 24, 2008, episode of Impact!, following interference from Team 3D. The feud ended on February 10 at Against All Odds, where Lethal, Shelley and Sabin defeated Team 3D and Devine in a six-man street fight, ending with Lethal pinning Devine to also win back the X Division Championship. On April 17, 2008, Lethal lost his X Division title after Petey Williams attacked him from behind after a match and cashed in his "Feast or Fired" briefcase for his X Division title shot.

On the next episode of Impact!, Lethal proposed to his on-screen girlfriend SoCal Val, which she accepted. At Slammiversary Sonjay Dutt, after months of teasing, finally turned heel by interrupting the wedding ceremony and proclaiming his love for Val, before attacking Lethal and his wedding guests. On the next two Impact! Lethal attacked Dutt out of rage when Dutt claimed that Val loved him. On the next Impact! So Cal Val said that she wanted to put off the wedding. Dutt and Lethal met at Victory Road in a one on one contest, which Dutt won after Val pleaded with Lethal to stop hurting Dutt, which allowed Dutt to take advantage and roll up Lethal. Lethal proposed to Val again, but found that her ring was missing, as Dutt had stolen it. Lethal and Dutt would meet again in a Black Tie Brawl and Chain match at Hard Justice, which Lethal won, even though Val distracted him by leaving during the match, because he wouldn't stop hurting Dutt. During a segment of Karen's Angle, Dutt confronted Val and attempted to seduce her, until Lethal attacked him and during the fight accidentally elbowed Val in the face. The following week Val announced that she would put the wedding ring up for grabs in a "Ladder of Love match" on September 14 at No Surrender. At No Surrender Val turned on Lethal by giving him a low blow, which allowed Dutt to climb the ladder and get the wedding ring.

==== Lethal Consequences (2008–2009) ====
At Bound for Glory IV Lethal won the Steel Asylum match to become the number 1 contender to the X Division title. On the October 23 live episode of Impact! Sheik Abdul Bashir defeated Lethal to retain the championship. The following week, Lethal along with A.J. Styles, Samoa Joe, Consequences Creed, Petey Williams, Eric Young, O.D.B. and The Motor City Machine Guns formed a faction of younger wrestlers known as the TNA Frontline to oppose The Main Event Mafia.

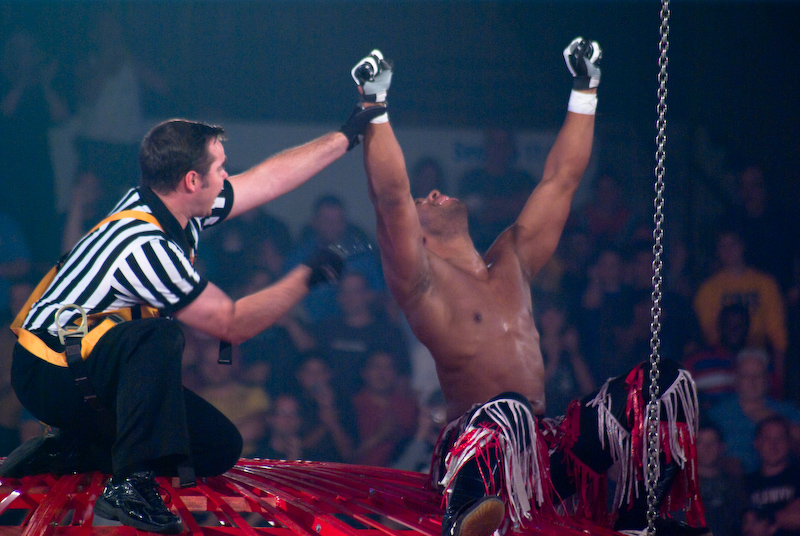
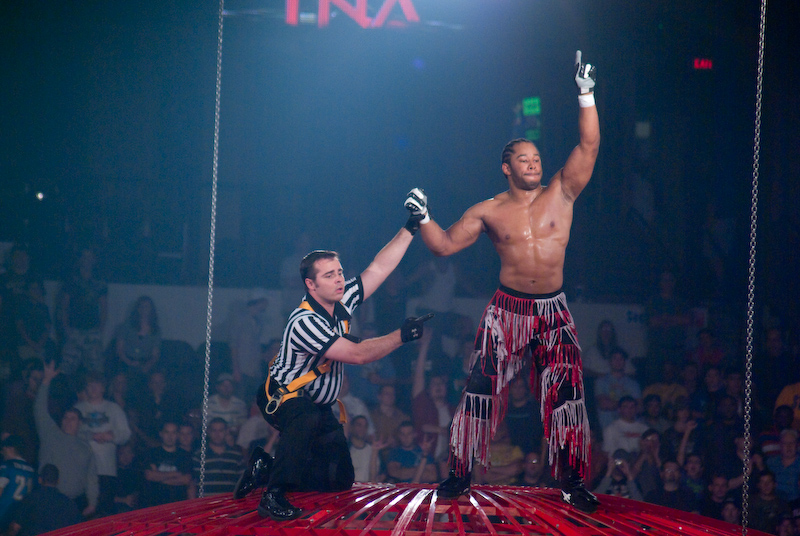
Lethal after winning the Steel Asylum at Bound for Glory IV On December 6, Lethal won one of the "Feast or Fired" briefcases, which was later revealed to contain a shot at the TNA World Tag Team Championship.

On the January 8, 2009 episode of Impact!, Lethal cashed in his briefcase, formed a team with Consequences Creed and defeated then-champions Beer Money, Inc. (Robert Roode and James Storm) after Roode's singles match with Matt Morgan to become the new TNA World Tag Team Champions. However, they quickly lost the titles back to Beer Money, Inc. at the Genesis pay-per-view on January 11.

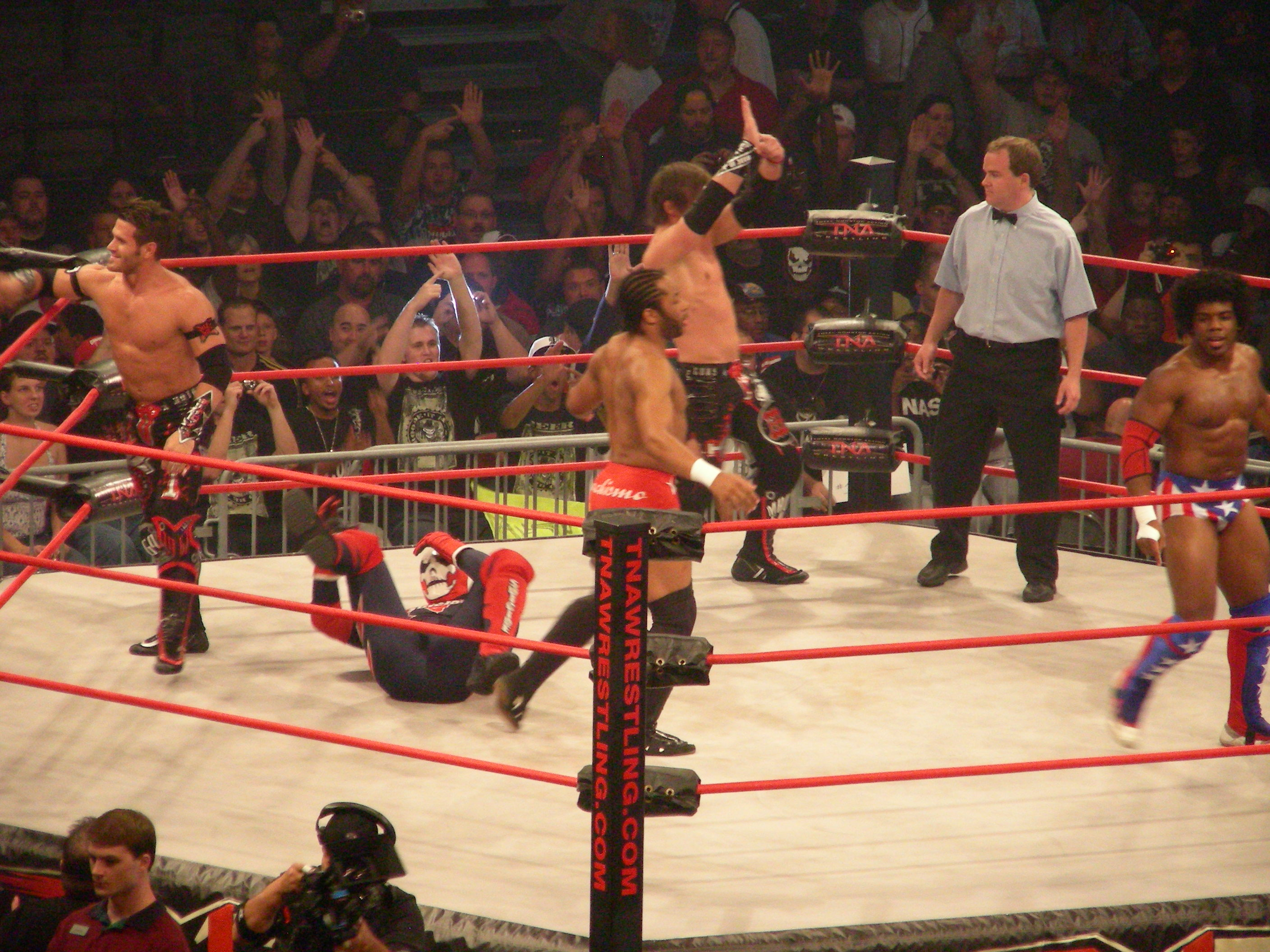
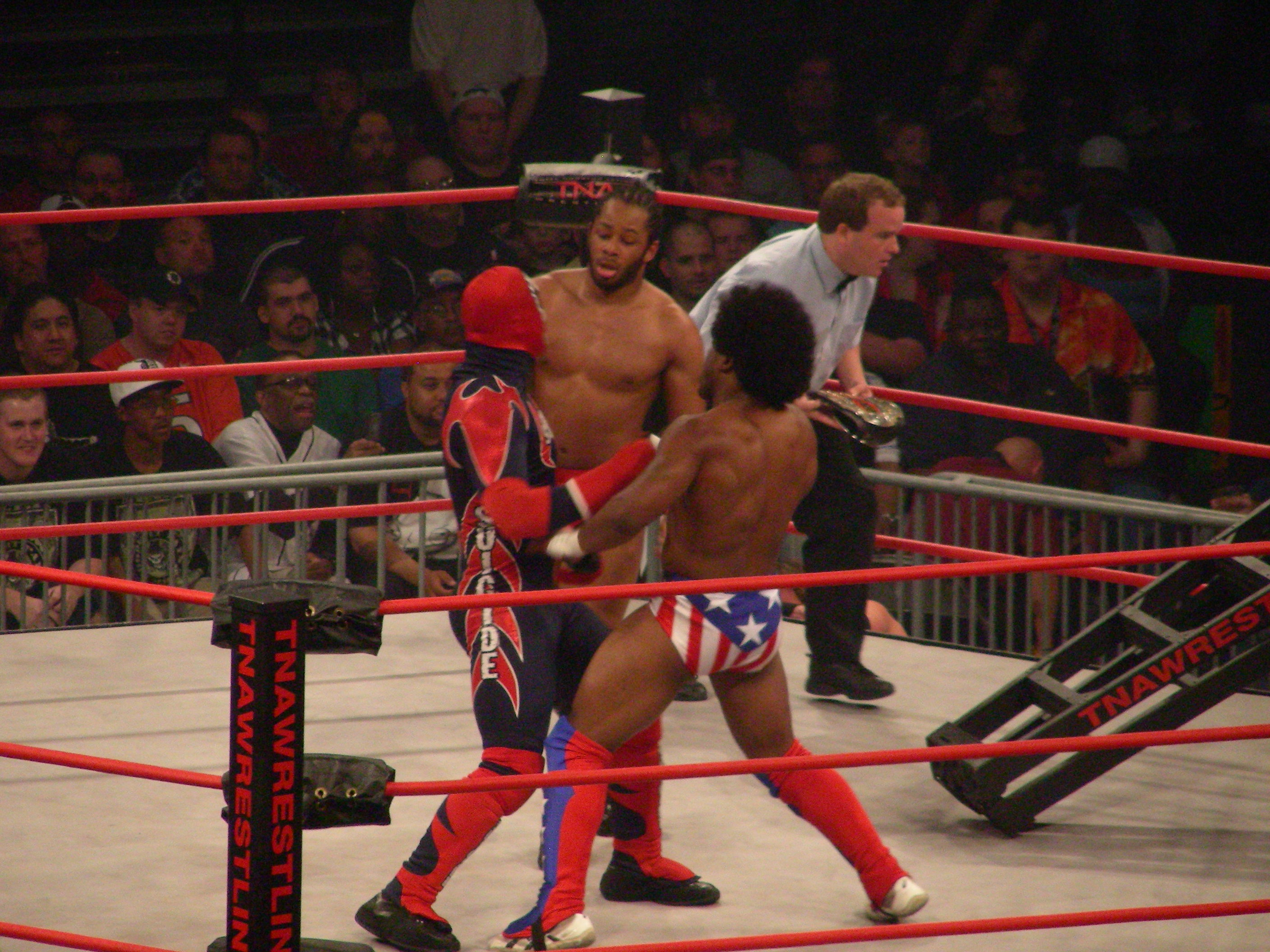
Jay Lethal in the ring beside his tag team partner Consequences Creed (The Lethal Consequences) double teaming Suicide.

On January 15, Lethal and Creed defeated Abyss and Matt Morgan to earn another shot at the Tag Team Championship. Upon becoming the number one contenders, Lethal and Creed formed a long-term tag team known as Lethal Consequences (a combination of their ring names) and then started a feud with The Motor City Machineguns (Alex Shelley and Chris Sabin) after dissention between the Guns and the Frontline. They were scheduled a match with the Guns on February 5, but Beer Money interfered in Creed's entrance, injuring his left shoulder. Frontline member Eric Young substituted for Creed, winning the match with a Death Valley driver to both Shelley and Sabin. Beer Money then went on to retain the title at Against All Odds due to Creed's shoulder injury. After their title match, Lethal Consequences continued their feud with the Motor City Machineguns, with both teams winning one match a piece over the next two weeks. At Destination X, Lethal competed in an Ultimate X match for the X Division Championship, along with Consequences Creed, Chris Sabin, Alex Shelley and Suicide, who ended up winning the match and the Championship.

On April 24, 2009, it was announced on TNAWrestling.com that Lethal had signed a new multi-year deal with the company.

On the November 5, 2009, episode of Impact! Jay Lethal announced an open invitational challenge. Due to the announcement of Hulk Hogan joining TNA, Lethal challenged wrestling legends to take him on. The following week, Jim Neidhart answered the challenge and defeated Lethal. The series continued on the December 17 episode of Impact!, when Tatanka answered the challenge and defeated Lethal in a singles match. After months of inactivity, Lethal's alliance with Consequences Creed came officially to an end on March 29, 2010, when Creed was released from his contract.

==== Feud with Ric Flair and Fortune (2010–2011) ====
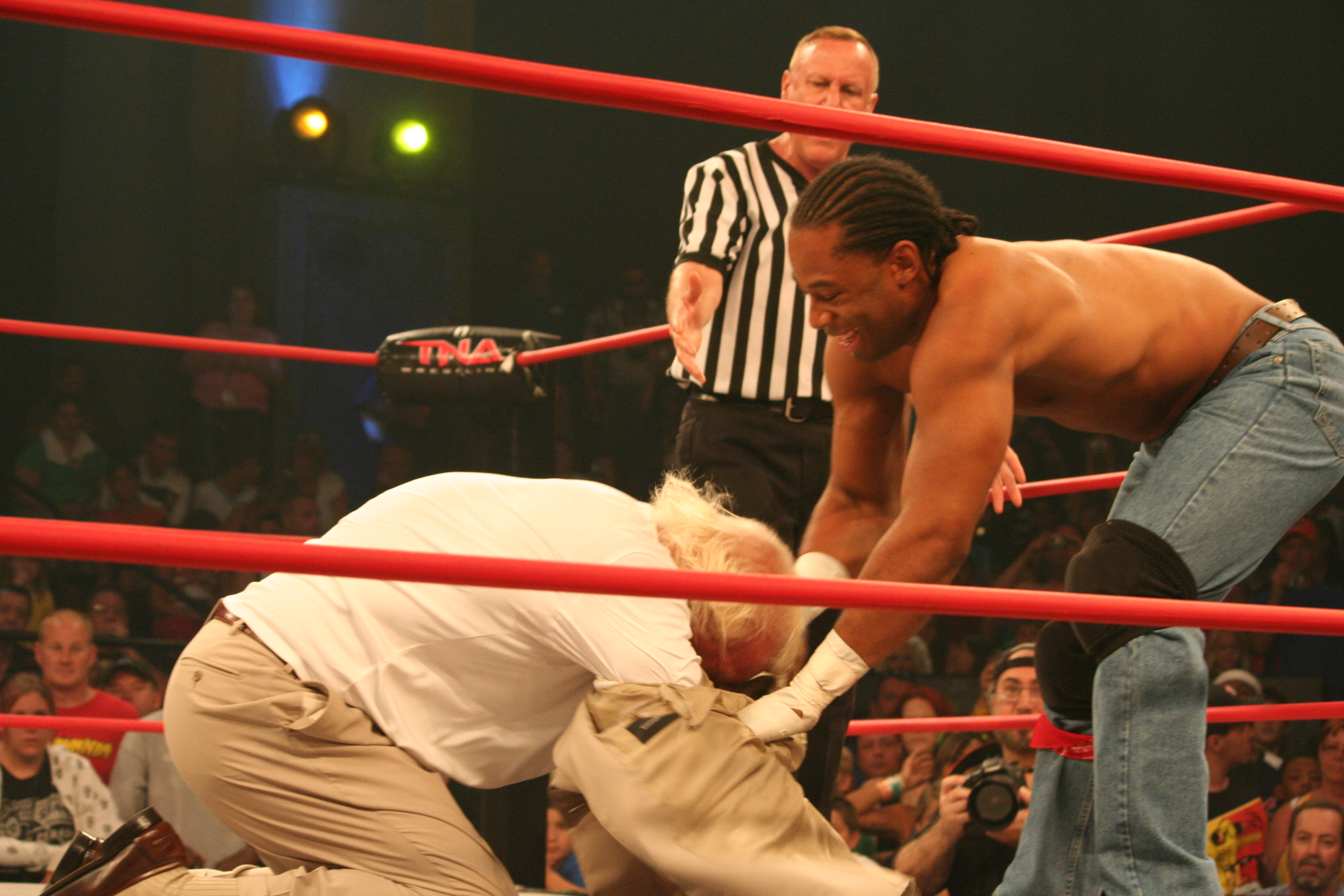
Lethal (right) wrestling Ric Flair in 2010

After spending most of early 2010 off TV, Lethal returned on the March 29 episode of Impact! by approaching Hulk Hogan, reminiscing about their days as "The Mega Powers" (Hogan's old team with Randy Savage). Playing along with Lethal's antics, Hogan placed him in charge of the show for his one-week absence due to a business trip. After raising the ire of Hogan's business partner Eric Bischoff with his comedic booking ideas, Bischoff placed Lethal in a two-on-one handicap match against Beer Money, Inc.; Lethal, however, managed to win the match after surprising Robert Roode with a roll-up. On the May 3 episode of Impact!, Hogan gave Lethal Ric Flair's Hall of Fame ring that Abyss had won from him the previous week. When Lethal, now imitating Flair, was confronted by Flair himself, he claimed that he meant no disrespect and out of respect towards Flair, returned the ring to him. This, however, wasn't enough for Flair, who attacked Lethal along with A.J. Styles, Desmond Wolfe and Beer Money, Inc., before he was saved by Abyss, Team 3D and the TNA World Heavyweight Champion Rob Van Dam. At Sacrifice, Lethal came out during the TNA World Heavyweight Championship match between champion Rob Van Dam and challenger A.J. Styles, and locked Ric Flair in a Figure-four leglock in order to prevent him from interfering in the match. On the May 20 episode of Impact!, Lethal competed in his first match after dropping the Black Machismo gimmick, and teamed up with Rob Van Dam to defeat Beer Money, Inc. in a tag team match. After the match, Lethal brawled with Flair. At Slammiversary VIII, Lethal defeated Flair's protégé A.J. Styles in a singles match. After defeating Desmond Wolfe, another one of Flair's allies, on the June 17 episode of Impact!, Hogan granted him a match with Flair at Victory Road. On July 11 at Victory Road, Lethal defeated Flair with his own move, the figure-four leglock. On the August 5 episode of Impact!, Lethal faced Flair in a rematch, this time contested under Street Fight rules, with A.J. Styles, Kazarian, Robert Roode and James Storm of Flair's Fortune stable banned from ringside. Flair managed to win the match, after an interference from X Division Champion Douglas Williams, who would officially join Fortune the following week. On September 6, at the tapings of the September 16 episode of Impact!, Lethal defeated Williams to win the X Division Championship for the fourth time. On September 23, at a live event in New York City, Lethal lost the X Division Championship to Amazing Red. Lethal regained the title two days later at a live event in Rahway, New Jersey. At Bound for Glory, Lethal successfully defended the X Division Championship against Douglas Williams.

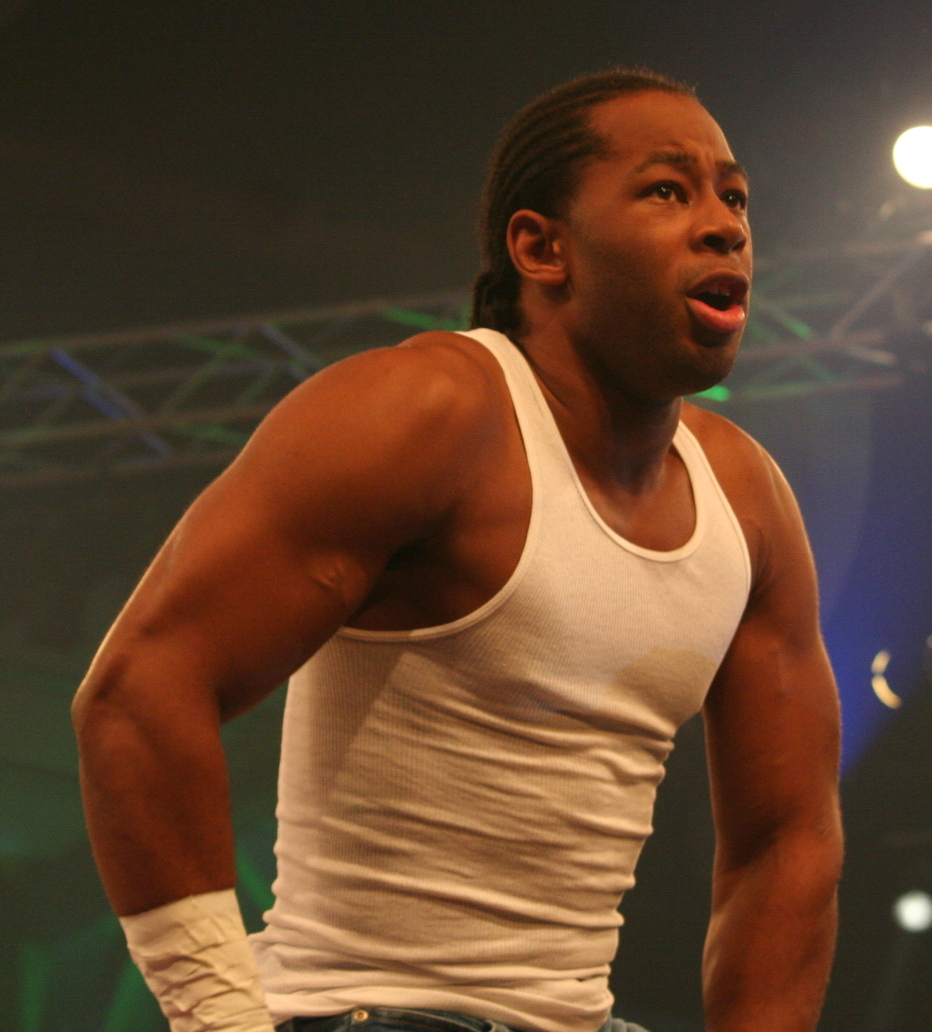
Lethal in 2010

After his title match at Bound for Glory, Lethal was attacked by Robbie E, who claimed he was a disgrace to New Jersey and vowed to bring some class to the X Division Championship himself. On the October 28 episode of Impact!, Robbie E defeated Lethal in a non–title Street Fight, after interference from his manager Cookie, to earn the right to challenge for the X Division Championship. At Turning Point, Lethal lost the X Division Championship to Robbie E, after another interference from Cookie. After suffering another loss to Robbie and Cookie on the following episode of Impact! in a mixed tag team match, where he teamed with Taylor Wilde, Lethal came to the conclusion that he needed to find someone who could negate Cookie the next time he went for the X Division Championship. At Final Resolution, Lethal faced Robbie E in a match for the X Division Championship, during which Cookie was suspended above the ring in a shark cage. Robbie retained the title via disqualification, when Lethal was caught using Cookie's hairspray on him. On December 7 at the tapings of the December 16 episode of Impact!, Lethal defeated Robbie E, after Christy Hemme came out to negate Cookie, to win the X Division Championship for the sixth time, and after the match celebrated with Hemme which led to a kiss between the two; Lethal now shared the record for most reigns as the X Division Champion. On January 9, 2011 at Genesis, Lethal lost the X Division Championship to Fortune member Kazarian. On April 21, 2011, it was reported that Lethal had parted ways with TNA. His final match for the promotion was an eight-man Xscape match, which took place on April 17 at Lockdown. His last televised match was aired on the April 19 episode of Xplosion, in a three-way match with Sangriento and Chris Sabin. Lethal's release from TNA was later used to ignite a storyline feud between the X Division and Eric Bischoff, as well as add fuel to the ongoing feud between the now-face Fortune and Bischoff's Immortal stable, with both Robert Roode and Brian Kendrick naming him on the May 5 episode of Impact!.

=== Return to ROH (2011–2021) ===
==== Various feuds (2011–2014) ====
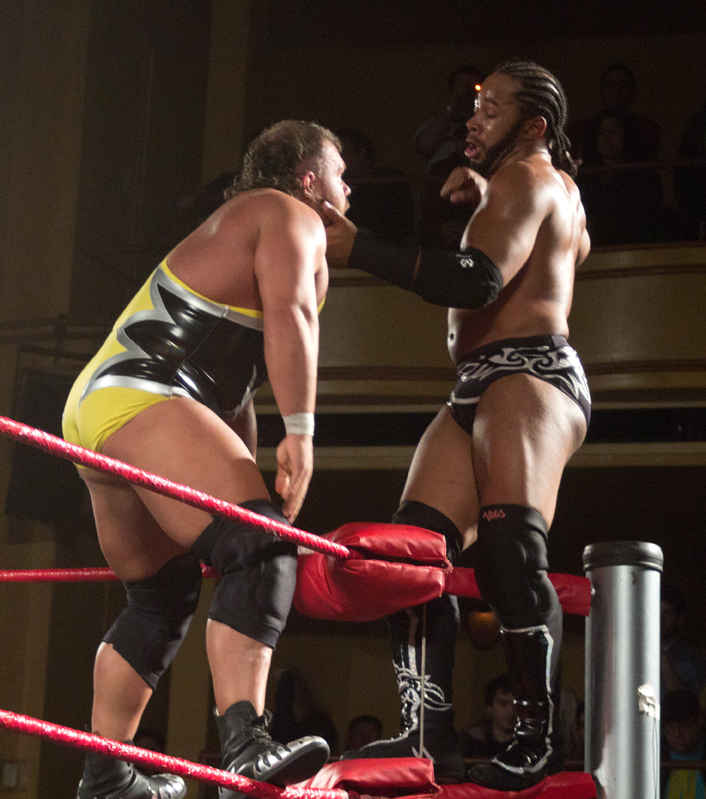
Lethal wrestling Michael Elgin in a number one contender's match at Supercard of Honor VII

On May 2, 2011, ROH announced that Lethal would be making his return to the promotion on June 26 at the Best in the World 2011 internet pay-per-view. In his ROH return match Lethal, as a face defeated Mike Bennett. On August 8, ROH announced that Lethal had signed a contract with the promotion. On August 13, at the first Ring of Honor Wrestling tapings under the Sinclair Broadcast Group banner, Lethal defeated El Generico to win the ROH World Television Championship. On September 17 at Death Before Dishonor IX, Lethal teamed up with fellow TNA alum Homicide in a tag team match, where they were defeated by Embassy's Rhino and Tommaso Ciampa. On December 3, Lethal defeated nineteen other men in the Honor Rumble to earn a shot at the ROH World Championship in 2012. On December 23 at Final Battle 2011, Lethal successfully defended the ROH World Television Championship in a three-way match against El Generico and Mike Bennett.

At the January 7, 2012, tapings of Ring of Honor Wrestling, Lethal successfully defended the title against Bennett in a No Time Limit match. On January 20, Lethal unsuccessfully challenged Davey Richards for the ROH World Championship. On March 4 at the 10th Anniversary Show, Lethal's ROH World Television Championship match with Tommaso Ciampa ended in a fifteen-minute time limit draw. On March 31 at Showdown in the Sun, Lethal lost the World Television Championship to Roderick Strong, following outside interference from Ciampa. At the following pay-per-view, Border Wars on May 12, Lethal defeated Ciampa in a singles match to end his undefeated streak. On June 24 at Best in the World 2012: Hostage Crisis, Lethal failed in his attempt to regain the World Television Championship from Strong in a three-way elimination match, also involving Ciampa. The feud between Lethal and Ciampa culminated on August 11 at Boiling Point, where Lethal defeated Ciampa in a two-out-of-three-falls match. On September 22, Lethal won the 2012 Survival of the Fittest tournament to earn another shot at the ROH World Championship. Lethal received his title shot on October 6 in Rahway, New Jersey, but the match with Kevin Steen ended in a no contest.

Following the match, ROH shot an angle, where Steen spat at Lethal's parents at ringside, which led to Lethal snapping and attacking several ROH officials, including Jim Cornette. Having found his "killer instinct", Lethal appeared at the following internet pay-per-view, Glory By Honor XI: The Unbreakable Hope on October 13, earning a submission win over Davey Richards. After defeating Rhino on December 16 at Final Battle 2012: Doomsday, Lethal petitioned for a shot at the ROH World Championship, which was turned down by matchmaker Nigel McGuinness, leading to Lethal spitting in his face and the two brawling with each other. At the January 5, 2013, tapings of Ring of Honor Wrestling, Lethal managed to coax Steen into accepting a title match with him, which led to McGuinness agreed to change his mind and make the match official. Lethal received his title shot on March 2 at the 11th Anniversary Show, but was defeated by Steen. On April 5 at Supercard of Honor VII, Lethal failed to earn another shot at the ROH World Championship, when he was defeated by Michael Elgin in a number one contender's match. After the ROH World Championship was vacated, Lethal entered a tournament to determine the new champion, defeating Sonjay Dutt in his first round match on July 27. On August 3, Lethal was eliminated from the tournament in the second round by Adam Cole.

==== ROH World Television Champion; ROH World Champion (2014–2016) ====
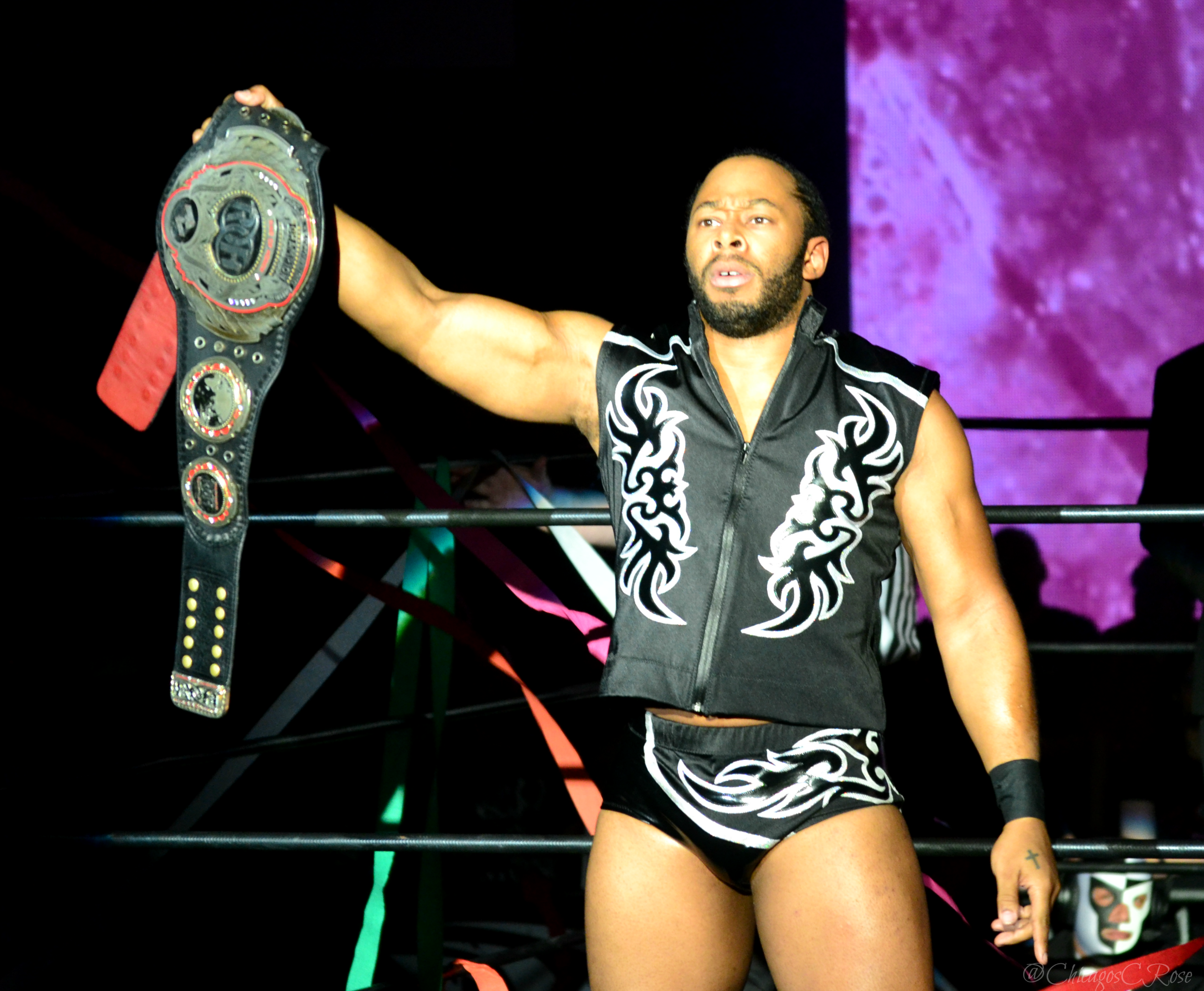
Jay Lethal holding the ROH World Championship belt at a taping on February 27, 2016

On April 4, 2014, at Supercard of Honor VIII, Lethal turned heel for the first time in nearly a decade by accepting help from Truth Martini, to defeat Tommaso Ciampa to regain the World Television Championship, becoming the first two-time holder of the title. After the match, Lethal declared that there was a house in ROH, "The House of Truth", marking the return of the stable with Lethal as the figurehead. Over the next year, Lethal would become recognized as the longest reigning World Television Champion in ROH history, with successful championship defenses against the likes of Matt Taven, Caprice Coleman, A. C. H., Matt Sydal on the last PPV of the year; Final Battle 2014 and again at the ROH 13th Anniversary Show against Alberto el Patrón. In March 2015, Lethal became the most successful World Television Champion of all time, with the most successful defenses as champion, more than doubling the previous record held by Matt Taven. On April 4, Lethal reached a full year in his title reign, effectively making him the holder of all records associated with the World Television Championship.

In April 2015, Lethal began professing himself as "the" ROH Champion, claiming his World Television championship was now the true top title that mattered in ROH (over the World Championship). In May 2015, Lethal debuted a new World Television Championship belt, which omitted the word "Television" and now read simply "ROH Champion". As a result, matchmaker Nigel McGuinness announced that at Best in the World 2015, Lethal would face Jay Briscoe in a winner-takes-all "Battle of the Belts" match with both the ROH World Championship and RHW World Television Championships on the line. Lethal defeated Briscoe after hitting Briscoe with his own Jay Driller and then a Lethal Injection to retain his title and win the World Championship, thus making him a double champion in the process, as well as becoming the first African-American to win the championship. The win also made him Ring of Honor's third Triple Crown Champion, as he is also a former ROH Pure Champion. On August 22, Lethal teamed with the "King of Strong Style" Shinsuke Nakamura to defeat reDRagon at Ring of Honor's Field of Honor event. On October 23 at Glory By Honor XIV, Lethal lost the Television Championship to Roderick Strong, ending his reign at 567 days, and 36 successful championship defenses.

As part 2015's "supershow" series with Preston City Wrestling, Lethal retained the ROH World Championship in three individual defenses over Noam Dar, Doug Williams and Joey Hayes. Through ROH's working relationship with New Japan Pro-Wrestling (NJPW), Lethal made his debut for the Japanese promotion on January 4, 2016, at Wrestle Kingdom 10 in Tokyo Dome, where he successfully defended the ROH World Championship against Michael Elgin. Lethal returned to the UK again to defend the ROH World Championship, this time defeating Mark Haskins at a sold-out show in York Hall, London for Revolution Pro Wrestling. On February 20, Lethal main evented the second night of the ROH and NJPW co-produced Honor Rising: Japan 2016 event in Tokyo, Japan, successfully defending the ROH World Championship against Tomoaki Honma. Afterwards, Lethal and Truth Martini joined Tetsuya Naito's Los Ingobernables de Japón stable. Lethal and Naito knew each other from working together in TNA. On March 26 of ROH tapings, Lethal successfully defended his title against Hirooki Goto. Afterwards, a rare double-turn took place when Donovan Dijak came out with Prince Nana and attacked Truth Martini. Lethal would then begin a feud with a returning Colt Cabana, who had set his sights on the ROH World Championship. At Global Wars, Lethal and Cabana fought to a no-contest after The Bullet Club interfered and attacked everyone in the ringside area, including Lethal. During the attack, Lethal was zip tied to the ring ropes and repeatedly superkicked by new Bullet Club member Adam Cole.

At Best in the World '16 on July 24, Lethal successfully defended his title after defeating Jay Briscoe. The two shook hands afterwards. The following day, Lethal was again attacked by Cole and Bullet Club, who shaved him bald. The following month, Lethal returned to NJPW, successfully defending the ROH World Championship against Satoshi Kojima on August 14. On August 19 at Death Before Dishonor XIV, Lethal lost the ROH World Championship to Adam Cole, ending his reign at 427 days.

==== Various feuds (2016–2018) ====
At Field of Honor Lethal was involved in a Four corner survival match for the ROH World Championship which was won by Adam Cole.

On August 20, 2016 Lethal was betrayed by Los Ingobernables de Japón after they walked out on Jay in a six-man tag team match. At All Star Extravaganza VIII Lethal defeated Tetsuya Naito. At Final Battle Lethal was defeated by Cody after he hit a low blow, then proceed to attack Lethal. Lethal defeated Jushin Thunder Liger in the first round of the Decade of Excellence. He was defeated by Jay Briscoe in the second round. On April 1 at Supercard of Honor XI Lethal defeated Cody in a Texas Bullrope match. On ROH TV taping Lethal defeated Silas Young, Jay White & Hangman Page in a four-way match to become #1 contender to the ROH World Championship. On May 12 at War of the Worlds, Lethal unsuccessfully challenged Christopher Daniels for the ROH World Championship in a three-way match, also involving Cody.

==== Second reign as ROH World Champion; ROH World Tag Team Champion; departure (2018–2021) ====
On the June 30, 2018 tapings of Ring of Honor Wrestling, Lethal defeated Dalton Castle for his second ROH World Championship, while also marking the first time the ROH World Championship changed hands at a non-pay-per-view event, a television taping and aired on tape delay. He would drop the title on April 6, 2019, to Matt Taven in a triple threat ladder match (with Marty Scurll also involved) at G1 Supercard, ending his second reign at 280 days.

On December 13, 2019, at Final Battle Lethal, along with Jonathan Gresham, won the ROH World Tag Team Championship for the first time, after they defeated The Briscoe Brothers. On the November 28, 2020 episode of Ring of Honor Wrestling, Lethal appeared with newly formed faction The Foundation (Jonathan Gresham, Rhett Titus, and Tracy Williams).

In October 2021, ROH announced they would enter into a hiatus until 2022. Shortly after the announcement, Lethal joined All Elite Wrestling and was pulled from the Final Battle card. However, after ROH World Champion Bandido was diagnosed with COVID-19, it was announced that Lethal would be replacing Bandido in his Final Battle match against Jonathan Gresham. At the event, Lethal was defeated by Gresham. This marked his final appearance with ROH prior to its acquisition by Tony Khan in March 2022.

=== Independent circuit (2011–present) ===
Lethal made his first independent appearance since his release from TNA on May 28, working for Lucha Libre USA. As a tribute to Randy Savage, who had died just a week earlier, Lethal worked in his Black Machismo gimmick in a tag-team match, where he and Magno were defeated by The Right (Jon Rekon and Petey Williams). In Lethal's second appearance for Lucha Libre USA on June 18, he defeated Medianoche in a singles match. On June 19 it was announced that Lethal would be taking part in the pilot tapings of All Wheels Wrestling on June 29, working under the ring name J.R. Lethal. At the pilot tapings, his ring name was changed to RPM. At the tapings he first defeated Dubai, the former Sheik Abdul Bashir, in a five-minute Iron Man match, but was then defeated by Schwagg Dutt, the former Sonjay Dutt, in an Ultimate X match, which also included Dubai and Aaron Aguilera.

On February 25, 2012, Lethal defeated Damien Darling at a Family Wrestling Entertainment (FWE) event to win the FWE Tri-Borough Championship. He lost the title to Darling on March 24, but later that same day first won the FWE Rumble and then defeated Eric Young for the FWE Heavyweight Championship. On July 28, Lethal lost the title to Tommy Dreamer in a four-way elimination match, which also included Brian Kendrick and Carlito. On March 22, 2013, Lethal made his debut for Southern California-based Pro Wrestling Guerrilla (PWG), losing to Eddie Edwards in a singles match. The following day, Lethal defeated Willie Mack at another PWG event. On May 25, Lethal took part in English promotion Southside Wrestling Entertainment's (SWE) Speed King 2013 tournament, eventually defeating Dean Allmark, El Ligero, Martin Kirby, Marty Scurll and MK McKinnan in a six-way final to win the tournament and become the new SWE Speed King Champion.

On July 30, 2016, Lethal defended the ROH World Championship against Denis Rivera for CWA in Puerto Rico where the CWA Heavyweight Championship was also on the line. Lethal was victorious, retaining his ROH World Championship and gaining the CWA title in the process.

Lethal made his What Culture Pro Wrestling (WCPW) debut on the second episode of WCPW Loaded in a match against El Ligero with the stipulation that if Ligero won he would get a shot at Lethal's ROH Championship. During the match, the two men (both being babyfaces) showed tremendous respect to each other; however, the match ended in a no contest when Martin Kirby interfered and attacked both men. After the match, Lethal stated that in order to defend his title, he would have to get permission from the Ring of Honor officials who were not present, but he guaranteed Ligero a shot at the title in the future. Later Lethal was against Noam Dar for his ROH World Championship on July 25, 2016 on the episode of WCPW: Built To Destroy, where Lethal won. Lethal was set to face El Ligero at WCPW Refuse To Lose on October 6, 2016. The match was originally scheduled to be for the ROH World Championship, but will instead be for the WCPW Internet Championship, due to Lethal no longer being ROH World Champion. In August, it was announced that Lethal would not be able to compete for the promotion due to contractual reasons. On WCPW Loaded episode 10 it was announced that Alberto El Patron would be Lethal's replacement.

Lethal returned to the promotion on January 29, 2017, where he took part of Triple Threat match for the ROH World Championship, which he lost. The match also included El Ligero; the winner was Adam Cole. On June 16 at the WCPW Build to Destroy 2017, Lethal would then defeat former ROH World Champion Davey Richards. After the match, Lethal was attacked by Drake, but he was able to fend off the attack.

On August 17, 2019; Lethal made his debut for High Impact Wrestling Canada at Battle Arts VI in Saskatoon, Saskatchewan. He unsuccessfully challenged Bobby Sharp for the HIW Wildside Provincial Championship.

On July 31, 2022, at Ric Flair's Last Match event, Lethal teamed with Jeff Jarrett losing to Ric Flair and Andrade El Idolo.

=== All Elite Wrestling / Second return to ROH (2021–present) ===
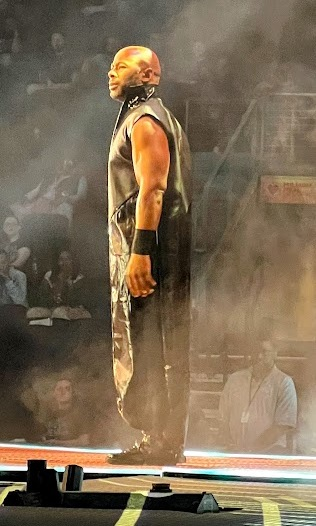
Lethal in 2023

On November 13, 2021, Lethal made his debut for All Elite Wrestling (AEW) at the Full Gear pay-per-view, challenging Sammy Guevara for the AEW TNT Championship on the November 17 episode of Dynamite, which Guevara accepted. Lethal would go on to lose the match, but got his arms raised by the Inner Circle post-match as a sign of respect. Lethal would then enter a feud with Team Taz in January 2022, which eventually led him to challenge Ricky Starks for the FTW Championship on the February 4, 2022 episode of Rampage; he eventually lost the match against Starks.

On April 1, 2022, Lethal returned to Ring of Honor, now owned by Tony Khan, and wrestled at Supercard of Honor XV. At the event, Lethal turned heel after using a low blow to defeat Lee Moriarty and then attacked crutch-donning Matt Sydal. He also would reunite with Sonjay Dutt, who restrained him as he was attacking Sydal, and the two began a feud with Samoa Joe after Joe won the ROH Television Championship.

On April 6, 2022, Lethal appeared on-screen with Sonjay Dutt, who was now his manager, and the two promised a present to Samoa Joe. The next week, Satnam Singh attacked Joe and aligned himself with Lethal and Dutt. On the May 6, 2022 episode of Rampage, Jay Lethal would defeat Konosuke Takeshita and have Dutt and Singh assist in attacking him, only for Best Friends (Orange Cassidy and Chuck Taylor) and Samoa Joe to make the save.

On Aug. 5, 2022, at Battle of the Belts III, Lethal failed to win the AEW TNT Championship from Wardlow. On November 2, Jeff Jarrett, debuting in AEW, attacked Darby Allin and aligned himself with Lethal, Dutt, Singh, and Cole Karter (who joined the group the same night dressing as Sting to ambush Allin), who came to be known as "The Lethal Connection". On November 19 at Full Gear, Lethal and Jarrett, representing The Lethal Connection, were defeated by Allin and Sting. On January 4, 2023 episode of Dynamite, The Lethal Connection (Lethal and Jarrett) challenged The Acclaimed (Anthony Bowens and Max Caster) for the AEW World Tag Team Championship, but failed to win the titles. Two days later at the Battle of the Belts V event, The Lethal Connection (Lethal and Jarrett) had a rematch with The Acclaimed in a No Holds Barred tag team match, which they were unsuccessful. On the January 18 episode of Dynamite, Lethal was unsuccessful at winning the AEW All-Atlantic Championship against Orange Cassidy. On January 25 episode of Dynamite, Lethal was defeated by Mark Briscoe in a tribute match to Jay Briscoe, who died in a car accident one week prior on January 17. After the match, Lethal and Briscoe hugged in the ring. On February 22 episode of Dynamite, The Lethal Connection (Lethal and Jarrett) won the Revolution Tag Team Battle Royal to be added to the AEW Tag Team Championship match, but were once again unsuccessful.

On the May 17 episode of Dynamite, The Lethal Connection (Lethal & Jarrett) and Karen Jarrett attacked the AEW World Tag Team Champions FTR (Cash Wheeler and Dax Harwood). The Lethal Connection (Lethal and Jarrett) failed to win the title from FTR at Double or Nothing, with Mark Briscoe as the special guest referee. On the June 14 episode of Rampage, The Lethal Connection (represented by Lethal, Jarrett, and Jarrett's wife, Karen) took on Mark Briscoe, Papa Briscoe and AEW referee Aubrey Edwards. During the match, Lethal was hit with the guitar by Edwards, who also made Karen submit with the figure-four leglock. Lethal was a participant in the inaugural Continental Classic, where he was placed in the Gold block. Lethal did not win a match in his block and recorded no points.

On the January 1, 2026 episode of Ring of Honor Wrestling, Lethal turned heel by attacking ROH World Champion Bandido and then formed an alliance with Blake Christian and Lee Johnson known as "The Lethal Twist". On August 21 at Death Before Dishonor, The Lethal Twist defeated Dalton Castle and The Outrunners (Turbo Floyd and Truth Magnum) to win the ROH World Six-Man Tag Team Championship, thus making Lethal the first man to win all five ROH men's championships.

== Other media ==
Shipman, under his Jay Lethal ring name, had a brief appearance in the critically acclaimed 2008 film The Wrestler. In November 2010, he was a contestant on an all-TNA week of Family Feud, teaming with Matt Morgan, Mick Foley, Mr. Anderson, and Rob Van Dam against Angelina Love, Christy Hemme, Lacey Von Erich, Tara, and Velvet Sky.

Lethal appeared in the video games TNA Impact!, TNA Impact!: Cross The Line, and TNA Wrestling Impact!.

== Championships and accomplishments ==
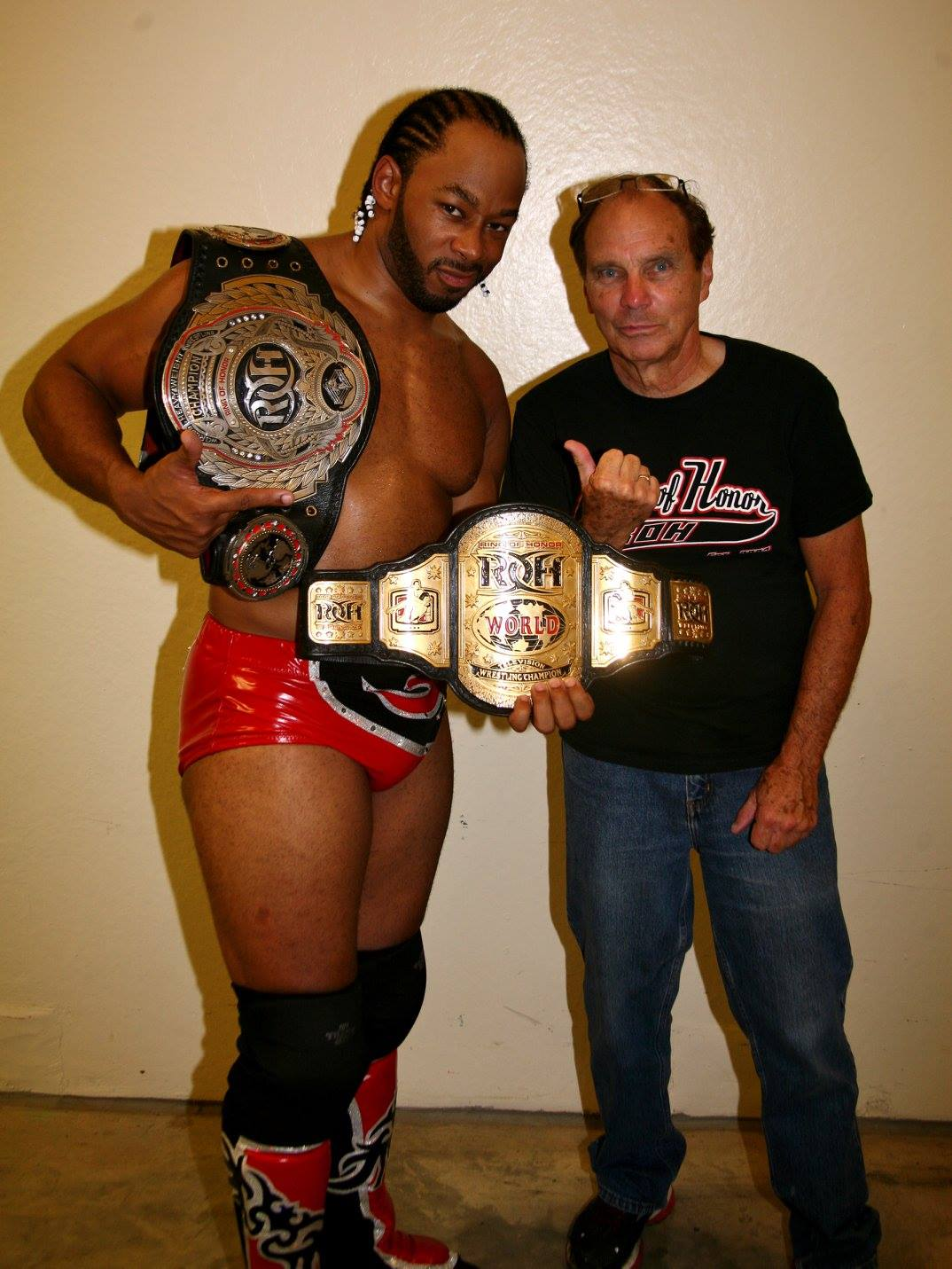
Lethal is a two-time ROH Television Champion (left hand), and two-time ROH World Champion (over shoulder)

- American Championship Entertainment
  - ACE Tag Team Championship (1 time) – with Mo Sexton
- Big Time Wrestling
  - BTW Heavyweight Championship (1 time)
- Champion Wrestling Association (Puerto Rico)
  - CWA World Championship (1 time)
- Discovery Wrestling
  - Discovery Awards (1 time)
    - Match of the Year (2016) – vs. Joe Coffey at Superkick Party Vol. 2
- Family Wrestling Entertainment
  - FWE Heavyweight Championship (1 time)
  - FWE Tri-Borough Championship (1 time)
  - FWE Rumble (2012)
- International High Powered Wrestling
  - IHPW Diamond Division Championship (1 time)
  - IHPW United States Heavyweight Championship (1 time)
- Politically Incorrect Wrestling
  - PIW World Championship (1 time)
- Jersey All Pro Wrestling
  - JAPW Heavyweight Championship (2 times)
  - JAPW Light Heavyweight Championship (1 time)
  - JAPW Television Championship (1 time)
  - JAPW Tag Team Championship (1 time) – with Azrieal
  - Jersey City Rumble (2009)
- Jersey Championship Wrestling
  - JCW Light Heavyweight Championship (1 time)
  - JCW Television Championship (1 time)
  - Jersey J-Cup (2003)
- Millennium Wrestling Federation
  - MWF Television Championship (1 time)
- National Wrestling Alliance Upstate
  - Upstate 8 Tag Team Tournament (2004) - with Azrieal
- National Wrestling Superstars
  - WSU/NWS King and Queen of the Ring (2009) – with Miss April
- Prairie Wrestling Alliance
  - PWA Championship (1 time)
- Pro-Wrestling ELITE
  - PWE Interstate Championship (1 time)
- Pro Wrestling Illustrated
  - Ranked No. 5 of the top 500 singles wrestlers in the PWI 500 in 2016
- Ring of Honor
  - ROH World Championship (2 times)
  - ROH World Television Championship (2 times) (Note: Lethal modified the championship's faceplate during his second reign to simply read as "ROH Champion".)
  - ROH Pure Championship (1 time)
  - ROH World Tag Team Championship (1 time) – with Jonathan Gresham
  - ROH World Six-Man Tag Team Championship (1 time, current) – with Blake Christian and Lee Johnson
  - Honor Rumble (2011)
  - Survival of the Fittest (2012)
  - Third Triple Crown Champion
  - Third Grand Slam Champion
  - ROH Year-End Award (6 times)
    - Wrestler of the Year (2018)
    - Feud of the Year (2017) vs. Silas Young
    - Match of the Year (2019) vs. Marty Scurll and Matt Taven at G1 Supercard
    - ROH Wrestler of the Decade (2020)
    - Tag Team of the Year (2020) with Jonathan Gresham
    - Faction of the Year (2020) – with The Foundation (Jonathan Gresham, Rhett Titus, & Tracy Williams)
- Southside Wrestling Entertainment
  - SWE Speed King Championship (1 time)
  - Speed King (2013)
- Stars & Stripes Championship Wrestling
  - SSCW Tradition Cup Championship (1 time)
- Total Nonstop Action Wrestling
  - TNA World Tag Team Championship (1 time) – with Consequences Creed
  - TNA X Division Championship (6 times)
  - Feast or Fired (2008 – World Tag Team Championship contract)
  - World X Cup (2006) – with Chris Sabin, Sonjay Dutt and Alex Shelley
  - TNA Year End Awards (1 time)
    - X Division Star of the Year (2007)
- Unreal Championship Wrestling
  - UCW United States Heavyweight Championship (1 time)
  - UCW World Heavyweight Championship (1 time)
- Wrestlezone Scotland
  - Wrestlezone Tag Team Championship (1 time) – with Scotty Swift
- Wrestling Observer Newsletter
  - Worst Worked Match of the Year (2006) TNA Reverse Battle Royal on Impact!
