= TNA Genesis (2009) =

2009 Total Nonstop Action Wrestling pay-per-view event

Genesis (2009)
- Promotional poster featuring Mick Foley
- Promotion: Total Nonstop Action Wrestling
- Date: January 11, 2009
- City: Charlotte, North Carolina
- Venue: Bojangles' Coliseum
- Attendance: 2,700

Pay-per-view chronology
← Previous; Final Resolution	Next → Against All Odds

Genesis chronology
← Previous; 2007	Next → 2010

The 2009 Genesis was a professional wrestling pay-per-view (PPV) event produced by Total Nonstop Action Wrestling (TNA), which took place on January 11, 2009, at the Bojangles' Coliseum in Charlotte, North Carolina. It was originally scheduled to take place on November 9, 2008, at the Impact! Zone in Orlando, Florida, however, TNA moved Turning Point to that date instead. It was the fourth event under the Genesis chronology.

== Storylines ==
Other on-screen personnel
Role:	Name:
Commentator	Mike Tenay
Commentator	Don West
Interviewer	Jeremy Borash
Interviewer	Lauren Thompson
Ring announcer	Jeremy Borash
Ring announcer	David Penzer
Referee	Earl Hebner
Referee	Rudy Charles
Referee	Mark Johnson
Referee	Andrew Thomas

Genesis featured eight professional wrestling matches that involved different wrestlers from pre-existing scripted feuds and storylines. Wrestlers portrayed villains, heroes, or less distinguishable characters in the scripted events that built tension and culminated in a wrestling match or series of matches.

== Results ==
No.	Results	Stipulations	Times
1	Eric Young and The Latin American Xchange (Hernandez and Homicide) defeated Jimmy Rave, Kiyoshi and Sonjay Dutt	Six-man elimination match	13:43
2	Alex Shelley defeated Chris Sabin	Singles match for the vacant TNA X Division Championship	16:38
3	Shane Sewell defeated Sheik Abdul Bashir	Singles match	10:18
4	Beer Money, Inc. (James Storm and Robert Roode) (with Jacqueline) defeated Consequences Creed and Jay Lethal (c) and Abyss and Matt Morgan	Three-way match for the TNA World Tag Team Championship	15:19
5	ODB, Roxxi and Taylor Wilde defeated The Kongtourage (Raisha Saeed, Rhaka Khan and Sojournor Bolt)	Six-Knockout tag team match to determine the #1 contender to the TNA Women's Knockout Championship	07:44
6	Kurt Angle defeated Jeff Jarrett	No Disqualification match	21:59
7	Sting (c) defeated Rhino	Singles match for the TNA World Heavyweight Championship	08:18
8	Mick Foley and The TNA Front Line (A.J. Styles and Brother Devon) defeated Cute Kip and The Main Event Mafia (Booker T and Scott Steiner) (with Sharmell)	Six-Man Hardcore match	14:02
(c) / – the champion(s) heading into the match

=== X Division Championship Tournament bracket ===
Quarterfinals; Impact! December 8–9, 2008 (Aired: December 11–18)
Eric Young	Pinfall
Sheik Abdul Bashir	3:16
Alex Shelley	Pinfall
Jay Lethal	1:56
Chris Sabin	Pinfall
Sonjay Dutt	5:20
Consequences Creed	4:35
Kiyoshi	Pinfall

Semifinals; Impact! December 15–16, 2008 (Aired: December 25, 2008 – January 8, 2009)
Eric Young	4:34
Alex Shelley	Pinfall
Chris Sabin	Pinfall
Kiyoshi	4:30

Final; Genesis; January 11, 2009
Alex Shelley	Pinfall
Chris Sabin	16:41

=== Six-Man Elimination Tag Team Match ===
Elimination	Wrestler	Eliminated by	Elimination Move	Time
1	Eric Young	Sonjay Dutt	Pinned after leg drop on ropes	10:33
2	Homicide	Jimmy Rave	Pinned by a Schoolboy	11:25
3	Kiyoshi	Hernandez	Pinned after Border Toss	12:45
4	Sonjay Dutt	Hernandez	Pinned after sitout powerbomb	13:03
5	Jimmy Rave	Hernandez	Pinfall after Diving splash	13:43
Winner:	Hernandez			
