= Impact Wrestling Lockdown (2020) =

Cancelled professional wrestling event

Lockdown (2020)
- Promotional poster featuring several Impact Wrestling wrestlers
- Promotion(s): Impact Wrestling; Border City Wrestling
- Date: March 28, 2020 (canceled)
- City: Windsor, Ontario, Canada
- Venue: St. Clair College

Impact Plus Monthly Specials chronology
| ← Previous; Sacrifice | Next → Victory Road |

Lockdown chronology
| ← Previous; 2016 | Next → 2026 |

The 2020 Lockdown was a scheduled professional wrestling Impact Plus event produced by Impact Wrestling in conjunction with Border City Wrestling, on March 28, 2020 at the St. Clair College in Windsor, Ontario, Canada. The event was cancelled due to the COVID-19 pandemic. It would have been the first Lockdown held since 2016, but following its cancellation, there would not be another Lockdown event for another six years until its return in 2026.

== Production ==
=== Background ===
Lockdown was previously held as a pay-per-view event from 2005 to 2014 by Impact Wrestling, then known as Total Nonstop Action Wrestling. In 2013, the promotion scaled back its monthly pay-per-view events in favor of the new pre-recorded One Night Only events. Lockdown would be dropped as a pay-per-view after 2014; it was then held as a special episode of the weekly television program Impact Wrestling in 2015 and 2016. On January 15, 2020, Impact Wrestling announced on Twitter that it would revive Lockdown as a monthly special for Impact Plus.

The event was to be co-produced with Border City Wrestling and would have been held on March 28, 2020 at the St. Clair College in Windsor, Ontario, Canada.

On March 13, Border City Wrestling announced St. Clair College, the venue for Lockdown, had canceled all upcoming events due to COVID-19 crisis.

=== Storylines ===
The card was to include matches that result from scripted storylines, where wrestlers portray heroes, villains, or less distinguishable characters to build tension and culminate in a wrestling match or series of matches, with results predetermined by Impact Wrestling writers, while storylines are produced on their weekly television program, Impact!

== Announced matches at the time of cancellation ==
| No. | Matches* | Stipulations |
|---|---|---|
| 1 | Team Edwards (Eddie Edwards, Tommy Dreamer, Daga, and Tessa Blanchard) vs. Team Elgin (Michael Elgin, Ethan Page, Josh Alexander, and Taya Valkyrie) | Lethal Lockdown match |
| 2 | Team Grace (Jordynne Grace, Alisha Edwards, and 2 TBA) vs. Team Rayne (Madison Rayne and 3 TBA) | Lethal Lockdown match |
*Card subject to change
