= TNA Lockdown (2016) =

Wrestling television special

Lockdown (2016)
- Promotion: Total Nonstop Action Wrestling
- Date: January 30, 2016; February 23, 2016 (aired)
- City: London, England
- Venue: Wembley Arena
- Attendance: 4,000
- Tagline: Free on Pop

Lockdown chronology
| ← Previous; 2015 | Next → 2026 |

Impact Wrestling special episodes chronology
| ← Previous; Turning Point | Next → Sacrifice |

The 2016 Lockdown (also known as Impact Wrestling: Lockdown) was a professional wrestling television special produced by Total Nonstop Action Wrestling (TNA), which took place on January 30, 2016 at the Wembley Arena in London, England as part of the TNA Maximum Impact 8 Tour in January 2016. It was the twelfth event under the Lockdown chronology. Like the previous year's event, the 2016 edition of Lockdown was not held on pay-per-view (PPV) and instead, was featured as a special edition of TNA's weekly broadcast of Impact Wrestling on Pop on February 23, 2016.

Five professional wrestling matches were contested at the event and all the events were contested inside a steel cage in the six-sided ring, dubbed the "Six Sides of Steel matches" while a Lethal Lockdown match was also featured at the event as per the theme of Lockdown events. The main event was a Six Sides of Steel match, in which Matt Hardy successfully defended the World Heavyweight Championship against Ethan Carter III. In other prominent matches, The Dollhouse (Jade, Marti Bell and Rebel) defeated Gail Kim and Velvet Sky in a Lethal Lockdown match and Trevor Lee retained the X Division Championship against Tigre Uno.

This was the last TNA Lockdown event until 2026, although another was planned for 2020, but cancelled due to the COVID-19 pandemic.

== Storylines ==
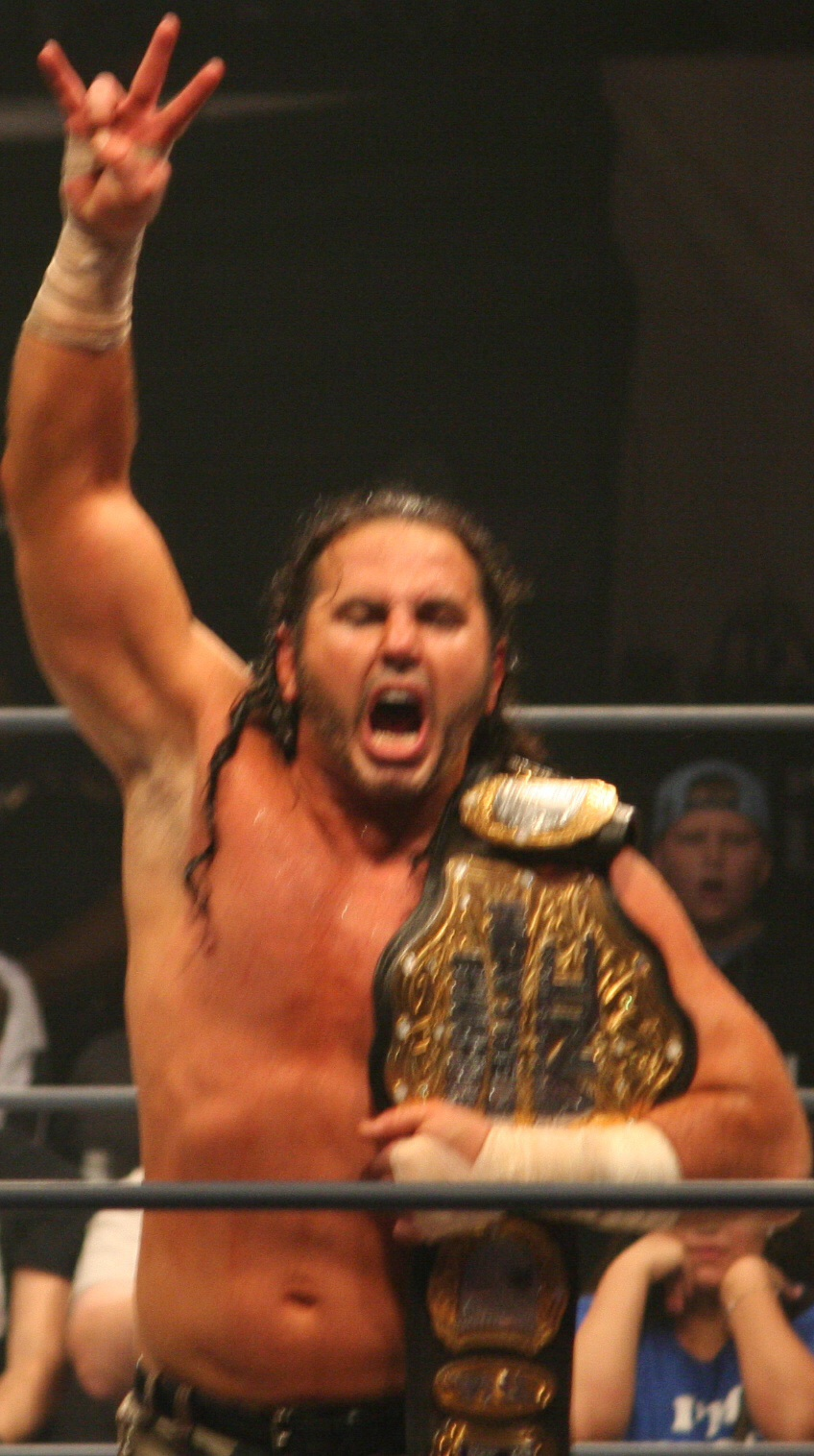
Matt Hardy was the defending World Heavyweight Champion heading into Lockdown.

At Bound for Glory, Matt Hardy defeated Ethan Carter III and Drew Galloway in a three-way match to win the World Heavyweight Championship, with Matt's brother Jeff Hardy as the special guest referee. EC3 filed an injunction against Matt that prevented him from appearing on television and Matt subsequently vacated the title. Matt and EC3 entered the TNA World Title Series tournament to crown the new champion and qualified to the tournament final on the January 5, 2016 episode of Impact Wrestling, where EC3 won. The following week, on Impact Wrestling, Matt demanded one final title shot against EC3 for the title where if he lost then he would leave TNA. EC3 agreed to a last man standing match for the January 19 episode of Impact Wrestling, which Hardy won after EC3's bodyguard Tyrus turned on him, resulting in a double turn as Hardy transitioned into a villain and EC3 became a fan favorite. On the February 16 episode of Impact Wrestling, Dixie Carter announced that EC3 would get a rematch against Hardy for the title in a Six Sides of Steel match at Lockdown.

At Bound for Glory, Gail Kim successfully defended the Knockouts Championship against Awesome Kong. On the January 5 episode of Impact Wrestling, The Beautiful People (Angelina Love, Madison Rayne and Velvet Sky) were supposed to take on The Dollhouse (Jade, Rebel and Marti Bell) in a six-woman tag team match but Love withdrew from the match due to her pregnancy and selected Gail Kim as her replacement. Kim, Rayne and Sky defeated Dollhouse in the subsequent match. After the match, Awesome Kong attacked Kim and joined Dollhouse. Kong and Jade defeated Sky and Rayne in a street fight on the following week's episode of Impact Wrestling. The two sides continued to feud with each other, facing in several matches until Kong departed TNA and the rest of the Dollhouse continued to feud with Kim, Sky and Rayne. On the February 16 episode of Impact Wrestling, Kim and Rayne defeated Bell and Jade in a tag team match and Dollhouse attacked them after the match until Sky made the save and challenged Dollhouse to a Lethal Lockdown match against Kim, Rayne and herself for Lockdown, which was later made official.

On the January 5 episode of Impact Wrestling, Bobby Roode successfully defended the King of the Mountain Championship against Bram in an open challenge and then Eric Young and Bram attacked Roode after the match until Roode's former tag team partner James Storm made his return to TNA and made the save for Roode against Young and Bram, thus reforming Beer Money, Inc. The following week, on Impact Wrestling, Young defeated Roode to capture the King of the Mountain Championship. On the February 16 episode of Impact Wrestling, Young issued an open challenge for the title, which was initially accepted by Roode but Storm stepped in as he claimed that Young had never beaten him. Young and Storm's title match ended in a double count-out and resulted in a brawl between Beer Money Inc. and the team of Young and Bram. It was later announced that Young and Bram would face Beer Money in a Six Sides of Steel match.

On the January 26 episode of Impact Wrestling, Gregory Helms interrupted Tigre Uno after Uno's successful title defense of the X Division Championship against Mandrews and challenged Uno to a title match for the next week, which Uno accepted and predicted that Uno would lose the title. The following week, on Impact Wrestling, Helms' new client Trevor Lee defeated Uno to win the title. Lee successfully defended the title against Uno on the February 9 episode of Impact Wrestling. It was later announced that Lee would defend the title against Uno in a Six Sides of Steel match at Lockdown.

On the January 26 episode of Impact Wrestling, Grado revealed one of the four briefcases in the Feast or Fired, which revealed to be a pink slip resulting in him getting fired. On the February 9 episode of Impact Wrestling, Grado revealed that he was screwed out and his briefcase switched places but Eli Drake came out with security and escorted Grado out of the arena. On the February 16 episode of Impact Wrestling, Grado appeared in a mask as Odarg the Great with the same moveset, mannerisms and entrance and teamed with Mahabali Shera to defeat Drake and Jessie Godderz by ripping off his mask and pinning Drake. Later at the show, Odarg informed Drake that the two would be facing each other in a Six Sides of Steel match at Lockdown.

== Event ==
=== Preliminary matches ===
The event kicked off with a Six Sides of Steel match between Beer Money, Inc. (Bobby Roode and James Storm) and the team of Eric Young and Bram. Beer Money attacked Young and Bram during their entrance and both teams brawled in the aisle to begin the match. As the match progressed towards conclusion, Beer Money hit a double suplex on Young and the Drinking While Investigating to Bram for the win.

Next, Trevor Lee defended the X Division Championship against Tigre Uno in a Six Sides of Steel match. Uno dived onto Lee from the top of the cage by hitting a diving crossbody and then Lee made a comeback by hitting a jumping knee strike and a small package driver to retain the title.

Later, Gail Kim and Velvet Sky took on The Dollhouse (Jade, Marti Bell and Rebel) in a handicap Lethal Lockdown match. Kim and Jade began the match as the first two participants. They were soon joined by Bell as the third entrant, who joined Jade in double teaming Kim. Sky entered next and sided with Kim to counter Jade and Bell. Rebel then entered next as the final participant. Maria Kanellis came in next to apparently replace the injured Madison Rayne as Kim and Sky's partner but she abandoned them. Dollhouse outnumbered Kim and Sky, allowing Jade to hit a package piledriver to Kim onto a chair for the win.

This was followed by the penultimate Six Sides of Steel match, in which Odarg the Great took on Eli Drake. Near the end of the match, Odarg tried to escape the cage until Drake ran and took off his mask to unmask him to reveal him to be Grado, who jumped off the cage to escape it for the win.

=== Main event match ===
The main event was a Six Sides of Steel match, in which Matt Hardy defended the World Heavyweight Championship against Ethan Carter III. Reby Sky tried to interfere in the match on Hardy's behalf by coming out with a hammer but Rockstar Spud took the hammer away from her and EC3 tried to escape the cage but Spud turned on him by slamming the cage door on EC3, which allowed Hardy to escape the cage to retain the title.

== Aftermath ==
Gail Kim began feuding with Maria as a result of her interference in the Lethal Lockdown. On the March 8 episode of Impact Wrestling, Kim successfully defended the Knockouts Championship against Jade.

Rockstar Spud became an ally of Matt Hardy, Reby Sky and Tyrus and Ethan Carter III attacked Spud on the March 1 episode of Impact Wrestling. On the March 15 episode of Impact Wrestling, Hardy successfully defended the World Heavyweight Championship against EC3 after Mike Bennett attacked EC3 and then Drew Galloway cashed in his Feast or Fired briefcase against Hardy and defeated him to win the title.

== Results ==
| No. | Results | Stipulations | Times |
|---|---|---|---|
| 1 | Beer Money, Inc. (Bobby Roode and James Storm) defeated Eric Young and Bram | Six Sides of Steel match | 08:33 |
| 2 | Trevor Lee (c) defeated Tigre Uno | Six Sides of Steel match for the TNA X Division Championship | 06:14 |
| 3 | The Dollhouse (Jade, Marti Bell and Rebel) defeated Gail Kim and Velvet Sky | Handicap Lethal Lockdown match | 11:15 |
| 4 | Odarg the Great defeated Eli Drake | Six Sides of Steel match | 06:40 |
| 5 | Matt Hardy (c) (with Tyrus and Reby) defeated Ethan Carter III | Six Sides of Steel match for the TNA World Heavyweight Championship | 11:35 |
(c) / – the champion(s) heading into the match
