= TNA Lockdown =

Total Nonstop Action Wrestling pay-per-view event series

Lockdown
- TNA Lockdown logo
- Promotions: Total Nonstop Action Wrestling
- First event: Lockdown (2005)
- Event gimmick: All matches are held inside a steel cage
- Signature matches: Lethal Lockdown

Lockdown is a professional wrestling event held by the American professional wrestling promotion TNA Wrestling. The event was first held in 2005 and was considered one of the flagship events in the company (alongside Slammiversary and Bound for Glory). The theme of the event is that the entire card would be contested inside a steel cage. Other matches on the card feature additional gimmicks added on to the steel cage format, such as the signature Lethal Lockdown match (a variant on the WarGames match), and the Xscape and "Queen of the Cage" matches.

Originally, Lockdown was to have only two cage matches to highlight the name; the 2013 event was the only one to follow this format. With the exception of the 2005 and 2006 events, Lockdown has been held outside the Impact Zone in Orlando, Florida. The first ten events were held on pay-per-view, while the last two events were broadcast as special episodes of Impact's weekly television series. On January 24, 2020, Impact announced the return of Lockdown as an Impact Plus special, to be held on March 28, 2020, but the event was cancelled due to the COVID-19 pandemic. On April 16, 2026, TNA announced the return of the pay-per-view event Lockdown on August 23, 2026, at Credit Union 1 Arena in Chicago, Illinois.

== History ==
The inaugural Lockdown event took place on April 24, 2005, at the TNA Impact! Zone in Orlando, Florida. The event started with Apolo and Sonny Siaki facing Chris Candido and Lance Hoyt in a Six Sides of Steel Cage match. During the match, Candido suffered a leg injury and was helped to the back as Apollo and Hoyt won the match. Candido was later diagnosed with a dislocated ankle, broken tibia, and a broken fibula that required surgery. On April 28, after the surgery, Candido was rushed to the hospital after he collapsed where he died a short time later due to a blood clot from the surgery. On May 15, 2005, at the inaugural Hard Justice event, TNA paid tribute to Candido with a ten-bell salute.

Lockdown remained a regular TNA's pay-per-view until the last event, which took place on January 30, 2016, and aired on tape delay on February 23, at the Wembley Arena in London, England. Lockdown will return as a pay-per-view event on August 23, 2026, at Credit Union 1 Arena in Chicago, Illinois.

== Events ==
#	Year	Date	City	Venue	Main event	Ref.
1	TNA Lockdown (2005)	April 24, 2005	Orlando, Florida	TNA Impact! Zone	A.J. Styles vs. Abyss in a Six Sides of Steel Cage match to determine the number one contender to the NWA World Heavyweight Championship	
2	TNA Lockdown (2006)	April 23, 2006	Orlando, Florida	TNA Impact! Zone	Jarrett's Army (Jeff Jarrett, Chris Harris, James Storm and Scott Steiner) vs. Sting's Warriors (Sting, A.J. Styles, Rhino and Ron Killings) in a Lethal Lockdown match	
3	TNA Lockdown (2007)	April 15, 2007	St. Charles, Missouri	Family Arena	Team Angle (Kurt Angle, Jeff Jarrett, Rhino, Samoa Joe and Sting) vs. Team Cage (Christian Cage, Abyss, A.J. Styles, Scott Steiner and Tomko) in a Lethal Lockdown match Harley Race was the gatekeeper.	
4	TNA Lockdown (2008)	April 13, 2008	Lowell, Massachusetts	Tsongas Arena	Kurt Angle (c) vs. Samoa Joe in a Six Sides of Steel match for the TNA World Heavyweight Championship	
5	TNA Lockdown (2009)	April 19, 2009	Philadelphia, Pennsylvania	Liacouras Center	Sting (c) vs. Mick Foley in a Six Sides of Steel match for the TNA World Heavyweight Championship	
6	TNA Lockdown (2010)	April 18, 2010	St. Charles, Missouri	Family Arena	Team Flair (Ric Flair, Desmond Wolfe James Storm, Robert Roode and Sting) vs. Team Hogan (Hulk Hogan, Abyss, Jeff Hardy, Jeff Jarrett and Rob Van Dam) in a Lethal Lockdown match	
7	TNA Lockdown (2011)	April 17, 2011	Cincinnati, Ohio	U.S. Bank Arena	Fortune (Christopher Daniels, James Storm, Kazarian and Robert Roode) vs. Immortal (Abyss, Bully Ray, Matt Hardy and Ric Flair) in a Lethal Lockdown match	
8	TNA Lockdown (2012)	April 15, 2012	Nashville, Tennessee	Nashville Municipal Auditorium	Bobby Roode (c) vs. James Storm in a Steel Cage match for the TNA World Heavyweight Championship	
9	TNA Lockdown (2013)	March 10, 2013	San Antonio, Texas	Alamodome	Jeff Hardy (c) vs. Bully Ray in a Steel Cage match for the TNA World Heavyweight Championship	
10	TNA Lockdown (2014)	March 9, 2014	Coral Gables, Florida	BankUnited Center	Team Dixie (Bobby Roode, Austin Aries and The BroMans (Jessie Godderz and Robbie E) vs. Team MVP (MVP, The Wolves (Davey Richards and Eddie Edwards) and Willow) in a Lethal Lockdown match Bully Ray was the special guest referee.	
11	TNA Lockdown (2015)	January 9, 2015 (Aired February 6)	New York City, New York	Manhattan Center	Team Angle (Kurt Angle, Austin Aries, Gunner and Lashley) vs. The Beat Down Clan (MVP, Kenny King, Low Ki and Samoa Joe) in a Lethal Lockdown match	
12	TNA Lockdown (2016)	January 30, 2016 (Aired February 23)	London, England	Wembley Arena	Matt Hardy (c) vs. Ethan Carter III in a Six Sides of Steel match for the TNA World Heavyweight Championship	
13	TNA Lockdown (2026)	August 23, 2026	Chicago, Illinois	Credit Union 1 Arena	The Hardys (Matt Hardy and Jeff Hardy) (c) vs. The Nemeths (Nic Nemeth and Ryan Nemeth) in a Steel Cage tornado tag team match for the TNA World Tag Team Championship	
(c) – refers to the champion(s) heading into the match

== Signature matches ==
Over the years, Lockdown has become a featured PPV in Impact Wrestling's monthly schedule, several gimmick matches have become recurring highlights of the show. These matches are intended to provide a different "flavor" to the show as opposed to a simple eight cage match card.

=== Lethal Lockdown ===
The first match ever announced for a Lockdown pay per view was the Lethal Lockdown, a variant of the WarGames match popularized in World Championship Wrestling. The match features a multi-man competition in which opponents from each team enter in alternating fashion. Victory can only be gained after everyone has entered the cage. The match has evolved over the years, developing from a three-on-three match (2005) to a four-on-four (2006, 2009, 2010-2011 and 2014) to a five-on-five (2007-2008, 2012-2013). Since 2006, the match also includes a roof to the cage, making it the only match with such a feature in TNA, until TNA introduced The Asylum.

=== Xscape Match ===
The second annually featured match on a Lockdown PPV was the Xscape match which was exclusive to the X Division. Consisting of a multi-stage, multi-wrestler competition, the rules involve wrestlers eliminating each other by pinfall or submission. Once the competition is down to two wrestlers, the two remaining competitors attempt to escape the cage by climbing out over the top or through the door. The second stage of this match is based on the concept of the Blassie cage match.

=== Queen of the Cage ===
Introduced in 2008, the Queen of the Cage match has been held at 2 Lockdown PPV's, and it features the TNA Knockouts. The match when it debuted began as similar to a reverse-battle royal involving eight wrestlers. The first two wrestlers that entered the cage then competed in a one-on-one match that was won via pin fall or submission. The winner became the number one contender for the TNA Women's Knockout Championship. In 2009, the match was a four-way. Since then, the matches have not been added in the pay-per-view any more.
