= TNA Lockdown (2009) =

2009 Total Nonstop Action Wrestling pay-per-view event

Lockdown (2009)
- Promotional poster featuring Sting and Mick Foley
- Promotion: Total Nonstop Action Wrestling
- Date: April 19, 2009
- City: Philadelphia, Pennsylvania
- Venue: Liacouras Center
- Attendance: 4,500

Pay-per-view chronology
← Previous; Destination X	Next → Sacrifice

Lockdown chronology
← Previous; 2008	Next → 2010

The 2009 Lockdown (marketed as Lockdown: Six Sides of Steel) was a professional wrestling pay-per-view (PPV) event produced by the Total Nonstop Action Wrestling (TNA) promotion, which took place on April 19, 2009 at the Liacouras Center in Philadelphia, Pennsylvania. It was the fifth event under the Lockdown chronology. In the theme of Lockdown events, every match took place inside a steel structure with six sides, known as Six Sides of Steel.

The main event was a Six Sides of Steel cage match for the TNA World Heavyweight Championship, in which Mick Foley defeated the reigning champion, Sting, to win the championship. Following another tradition of Lockdown events, TNA held the annual Lethal Lockdown match, which was contested inside a steel structure with a flat roof; in this match, Team Jarrett defeated Team Angle. Two featured bouts were scheduled on the undercard. In a Philadelphia Street Fight for the TNA World Tag Team and IWGP World Tag Team Championships, Team 3D (Brother Ray and Brother Devon) defeated Beer Money, Inc. (Robert Roode and James Storm) to retain the IWGP World Tag Team and to win the TNA World Tag Team Championship. The other bout was a Doomsday Chamber of Blood match, which saw Matt Morgan defeat Abyss.

Mick Foley chronicled the build to his match against Sting in the fourth volume of his memoirs, Countdown to Lockdown: A Hardcore Journal.

== Production ==
=== Storylines ===
Other on-screen personnel
Role:	Name:
Commentator	Mike Tenay
Commentator	Don West
Interviewer	Jeremy Borash
Interviewer	Lauren Thompson
Ring announcer	Jeremy Borash
Ring announcer	David Penzer
Referee	Earl Hebner
Referee	Rudy Charles
Referee	Mark Johnson
Referee	Andrew Thomas

Lockdown featured nine professional wrestling matches that involved different wrestlers from pre-existing scripted feuds, plots, and storylines. Wrestlers will be portrayed as either villains or heroes in the scripted events that build tension and culminated into a wrestling match or series of matches. Traditionally, every match was contested inside a 16 foot (4.9 m) high steel structure with six sides known as Six Sides of Steel.

The main event at Lockdown featured TNA World Heavyweight Champion Sting defending the title against Mick Foley in a Six Sides of Steel cage match. On the March 19 episode of TNA's primary television program, TNA Impact!, the team of Foley and Jeff Jarrett defeated the team of Kurt Angle and Sting, after Foley hit Sting with a steel chair which allowed Foley to gain the pinfall victory. As a result of Foley's actions, Sting challenged him to a match at Lockdown with the TNA World Heavyweight Championship on the line.

Continuing another tradition of Lockdown events, TNA held the fifth annual Lethal Lockdown match. In this match, one wrestler from each four-member team started in the ring; after five minutes, another wrestler entered, followed two minutes later by a member of the other team. Every two minutes, a new wrestler entered until all ten were in the ring; at this point a ceiling with weapons attached was lowered and pinfalls or submissions were allowed. On the March 26 episode of Impact!, a 20–man Six Sides of Steel Gauntlet match was held to determine the two captains for the match at Lockdown; the last two wrestlers to not be eliminated in the match would win this honor. Kurt Angle and Samoa Joe were last two remaining wrestlers in the contest. Joe refused to be captain of his team at Lockdown so Jarrett was appointed in his place on the April 3 episode of Impact!; setting up the official teams at Lockdown—Team Angle and Team Jarrett. Also on that episode, Booker T, Kevin Nash, and Scott Steiner were chosen by Angle to compete alongside him at Lockdown, while A.J. Styles was given the third spot in Team Jarrett; joining Jarrett and Joe. On the April 10 episode of Impact!, Christopher Daniels was announced as the fourth member of Team Jarrett.

The main feud in the tag team division was between Team 3D (Brother Ray and Brother Devon) and Beer Money, Inc. (Robert Roode and James Storm). Beer Money, the TNA World Tag Team Champions, granted Team 3D a title shot at Lockdown in Philadelphia (the city where Team 3D wrestled when a part of the hardcore wrestling promotion Extreme Championship Wrestling). Team 3D, who were the IWGP Tag Team Champions agreed to the match and announced they would defend their IWGP titles too - making the winner of the match both TNA and IWGP Tag Team Champions.

== Results ==
No.	Results	Stipulations	Times
1^{P}	Eric Young defeated Danny Bonaduce	Six Sides of Steel Cage match	03:24
2	Suicide (c) defeated Consequences Creed, Kiyoshi, Jay Lethal and Sheik Abdul Bashir	Xscape match for the TNA X Division Championship	11:37
3	ODB (with Cody Deaner) defeated Daffney, Madison Rayne and Sojournor Bolt	Queen of the Cage match	06:05
4	The Motor City Machine Guns (Alex Shelley and Chris Sabin) (c) defeated Latin American Xchange (Hernandez and Homicide) and No Limit (Naito and Yujiro)	Six Sides of Steel Cage match for the IWGP Junior Heavyweight Tag Team Championship	11:49
5	Matt Morgan defeated Abyss	Doomsday Chamber of Blood match	12:26
6	Angelina Love (with Velvet Sky) defeated Awesome Kong (c) (with Raisha Saeed) and Taylor Wilde	Six Sides of Steel Cage match for the TNA Women's Knockout Championship	06:53
7	Team 3D (Brother Devon and Brother Ray) (IWGP Champions) defeated Beer Money, Inc. (James Storm and Robert Roode) (TNA Champions)	Philadelphia Street Fight for the TNA World and IWGP Tag Team Championships	14:59
8	Team Jarrett (A.J. Styles, Christopher Daniels, Jeff Jarrett and Samoa Joe) defeated Team Angle (Booker T, Kevin Nash, Kurt Angle and Scott Steiner) (with Sharmell)	Lethal Lockdown match	23:01
9	Mick Foley defeated Sting (c)	Six Sides of Steel Cage match for the TNA World Heavyweight Championship	15:54
(c) / – the champion(s) heading into the match; P / – the match was broadcast on the pre-show

=== Xscape match ===
Elimination no.	Eliminated	Eliminated by	Notes
1	Kiyoshi	Consequences Creed and Jay Lethal	Pinned by both Lethal and Creed after a Fireman's carry cutter by Creed followed by a diving elbow drop by Lethal
2	Consequences Creed	Sheik Abdul Bashir	Pinned after a WMD
3	Jay Lethal	Sheik Abdul Bashir	Pinned after a Suicide Solution by Suicide
Loser	Sheik Abdul Bashir	N/A	Bashir failed to escape the cage before Suicide
Winner	Suicide	N/A	Suicide escaped the cage before Bashir to win the match and retain the championship
