= TNA Lockdown (2015) =

Professional wrestling television special

Lockdown (2015)
- Promotion: Total Nonstop Action Wrestling
- Date: January 9, 2015 (aired on February 6, 2015)
- City: New York City, New York
- Venue: Manhattan Center
- Attendance: 1,100
- Tagline: Every match contested in the six sides of steel!

Lockdown chronology
← Previous; 2014	Next → 2016

Impact Wrestling special episodes chronology
← Previous; No Surrender	Next → TKO: A Night of Knockouts

The 2015 Lockdown (also known as Impact Wrestling: Lockdown) was a professional wrestling television special produced by Total Nonstop Action Wrestling (TNA). The show took place on January 9, 2015 at the Manhattan Center in New York, New York. It was the eleventh event under the Lockdown chronology. Unlike the previous events, this event was not held on pay-per-view (PPV) and instead, was featured as a special edition of TNA's weekly broadcast of Impact Wrestling on Destination America on February 6.

Five professional wrestling matches were contested at the event. The main event was a Lethal Lockdown match, in which Team Angle (Kurt Angle, Austin Aries, Gunner and Lashley) defeated The Beat Down Clan (MVP, Kenny King, Samoa Joe and Low Ki). All the matches at the event were contested under the steel cage in the six-sided ring dubbed the "Six Sides of Steel matches".

== Production ==
=== Background ===
In July 2014, it was reported that Spike TV would not renew its deal with TNA to air its television program Impact Wrestling, with the deal to expire in October. The major reason was that TNA rehired Vince Russo, whom Spike disliked for the way he booked professional wrestling shows. The deal expired in September. TNA would sign a contract with Discovery Communications in November to air Impact Wrestling in 2015. The first television tapings for Impact Wrestling on Destination America were announced to take place across three nights from January 7 to January 9, 2015 at the Manhattan Center in New York City. The television tapings concluded on January 9, with matches taped for a special episode of Impact Wrestling to air on February 6. The episode was titled "Lockdown", thus continuing the former pay-per-view event as a television special.

=== Storylines ===
On the June 26, 2014 episode of Impact Wrestling, the TNA Board of Directors removed MVP from his position as the Director of Wrestling Operations due to his abuse of power and replaced him with Kurt Angle, who returned from a hiatus due to injury. The bitterness between Angle and MVP continued throughout the year, until Angle announced that he had stepped down from his authoritative position and returned as a part of the active roster on the January 7, 2015 episode of Impact Wrestling. He had scheduled one final match as Director of Wrestling Operations, a street fight against MVP, after MVP goaded him into it by insulting him that he was no longer a professional wrestler, and just a shadow of the person who once won the gold medal in the 1996 Summer Olympics. Angle would go on to defeat MVP in the street fight. The following week, on Impact wrestling, MVP formed a new faction with Kenny King, Low Ki and Samoa Joe called The Beat Down Clan. Joe would then defeat Angle in a match, while Ki would defeat Austin Aries to win the X Division Championship after assistance by BDC. Later that night, MVP claimed that the World Heavyweight Championship had become a part of Beat Down Clan after Lashley won the title the previous week. However, Lashley objected to it, saying that the title belonged to him, leading to BDC turning on him and attacking him, thus removing him from the group. BDC then picked up the title belt and left. On the January 23 episode of Impact Wrestling, Lashley demanded that BDC return his title belt, but was instead challenged to a match by King, which Lashley won by disqualification after BDC attacked him. MVP challenged Lashley to a New York City Street Fight later in the night. BDC interfered in the fight until Angle and Bobby Roode made the save and chased them off. Lashley then got back his title belt. On the January 30 episode of Impact Wrestling, Angle announced that he would assemble a team to fight BDC in a Lethal Lockdown match at Lockdown, recruiting Aries and Gunner to his team. Angle offered the fourth spot to Lashley but Lashley refused.

On the January 7 episode of Impact Wrestling, Eric Young interfered in his former Team Canada tag team partner Bobby Roode's World Heavyweight Championship title defense against Bobby Lashley. Young turned on Roode by attacking him with the title belt, thus costing him the title. The following week, on Impact Wrestling, Young defeated Roode in a no disqualification match. On the January 30 episode of Impact Wrestling, Roode challenged Young to a Six Sides of Steel match at Lockdown, which Young accepted.

On the January 7 episode of Impact Wrestling, Awesome Kong made her surprise return to TNA after a five-year absence, confronting Havok after the latter attacked Taryn Terrell due to failing to win the Knockouts Championship from Terrell in a Knockouts battle royal. Kong and Havok confronted each other during the following weeks, leading to a Six Sides of Steel match between the two at Lockdown.

On the November 5, 2014 episode of Impact Wrestling, The Hardys (Jeff Hardy and Matt Hardy) defeated Low Ki and Samoa Joe to win a tag team tournament to become the #1 contenders for the World Tag Team Championship. On the January 7 episode of Impact Wrestling, Hardys interfered in the World Tag Team Championship between The Revolution (Abyss and James Storm) and The Wolves (Davey Richards and Eddie Edwards) by preventing Revolution members The Great Sanada and Manik from interfering in the match. Jeff Hardy prevented Abyss from using the cowbell and tried to attack him but Abyss countered and Hardy accidentally hit Edwards with it, leading to Revolution winning the match and retaining the titles. This led to Hardys taking on Wolves for the #1 contendership for the World Tag Team Championship on the January 16 episode of Impact Wrestling. Hardys won to retain their #1 contendership. Hardys would battle Revolution over the following weeks, as Matt defeated James Storm on the January 23 episode of Impact Wrestling, and Jeff defeated Abyss in a Monster's Ball match on the January 30 episode of Impact Wrestling. It was later announced that Revolution would defend the titles against Hardys in a Six Sides of Steel match at Lockdown.

The feud between Rockstar Spud and Ethan Carter III dated back to the October 8 episode of Impact Wrestling, where EC3 held Spud responsible for failing to prevent Bully Ray from putting Dixie Carter through a table. EC3 slapped Spud and Spud punched him in the face. EC3 would then fire Spud from his position as Carters' chief of staff. After weeks of feuding, EC3 cut off Spud's hair after Spud was assaulted by EC3's bodyguard Tyrus. Jeremy Borash objected to it and slapped EC3, leading to Tyrus attacking Borash and EC3 shaving his head with a clipper on the January 7 episode of Impact Wrestling. EC3 then forced Borash to wrestle him in a match on the January 23 episode of Impact Wrestling. Spud interfered in the match but Tyrus attacked him, until Mandrews made his TNA debut and helped Spud in fighting off EC3 and Tyrus. EC3 retreated the ring while Spud and Mandrews outnumbered Tyrus. On the January 30 episode of Impact Wrestling, EC3 and Tyrus refused to wrestle Spud and Mandrews, and instead chose BroMans (Robbie E and Jessie Godderz) as their replacement. Spud and Mandrews defeated BroMans, and Tyrus attacked them after the match. EC3 then announced that Spud and Mandrews would take on Tyrus in a handicap Six Sides of Steel match at Lockdown.

== Event ==
=== Preliminary matches ===
The event kicked off with a Six Sides of Steel match, in which The Revolution (Abyss and James Storm) defended the World Tag Team Championship against The Hardys (Jeff Hardy and Matt Hardy). Near the end of the match, Khoya pulled Storm out of the cage through a hole and then Jeff tried to climb the cage after delivering a Twist of Fate to Abyss but Sanada spit mist on him, allowing Storm to hit a Last Call to Jeff to retain the titles. After the match, Revolution attacked Hardys as Khoya hit a Sky High to Matt through a table and then Manik tried to hit a frog splash on Jeff through a table but Jeff moved out and Manik crashed through the table. Jeff then climbed to the top of the cage and tried to climb down but Abyss knocked him off and he crotched on the cage door and Storm slammed a cowbell with Jeff's head causing him to fall down onto the steel ring steps.

The match was followed by a brawl between Team Angle (Kurt Angle, Austin Aries and Gunner) and The Beat Down Clan (MVP, Kenny King, Samoa Joe and Low Ki), during which BDC outnumbered Team Angle and injured Gunner's arm.

Next, Awesome Kong took on Havok in a Six Sides of Steel match. Havok began brawling with Kong in the aisle to begin the match. Kong nailed an Awesome Bomb and a diving splash to Havok for the win.

Later, Bobby Roode took on Eric Young in a Six Sides of Steel match. Roode tossed a chair at Young to knock him off the top rope and then repeatedly hit him with the chair and performed a Roode Bomb on Young onto the chair for the win.

It was followed by the penultimate Handicap Six Sides of Steel match, in which Tyrus took on Mark Andrews and Rockstar Spud. Ethan Carter III interfered in the match on Tyrus' behalf by attacking Andrews and Spud, allowing Tyrus to hit a Tongan death grip into a chokeslam on Spud for the win. After the match, EC3 tried to shave Spud's hair but Jeremy Borash cut off the cord of the shaver.

=== Main event match ===
The main event was a Lethal Lockdown match between Team Angle (Kurt Angle, Austin Aries, Gunner and Lashley) and Beat Down Clan (MVP, Low Ki, Kenny King and Samoa Joe). Gunner and King were the first two entrants of the match. Low Ki entered next and assisted King in attacking Gunner. Aries would enter next to even the odds. Joe entered as the fifth entrant of the match. Angle entered next who would run right into a hockey stick by Joe. He was followed by MVP, thus completing all the four members of BDC and Team Angle was outnumbered. Lashley would enter next as the final entrant to even the odds for Team Angle. After a back and forth action between the two teams, Lashley hit a spear to MVP for the win.

== Aftermath ==
Bobby Lashley and Kurt Angle continued their rivalry with Beat Down Clan after Lockdown as Lashley and Angle took on BDC members MVP and Samoa Joe on the February 13 episode of Impact Wrestling. BDC attacked Lashley and Angle's Lockdown teammates Austin Aries and Gunner before the tag team match, and went on to defeat Lashley and Angle after a miscommunication between the two. MVP would then win a Gauntlet for the Gold to earn a World Heavyweight Championship title shot against Lashley on the February 27 episode of Impact Wrestling, which MVP failed to win after interference by Drew Galloway. BDC would then begin feuding with Galloway, who had picked up a fight with BDC since his debut on the February 20 episode of Impact Wrestling. On the March 27 episode of Impact Wrestling, Galloway cost Low Ki, his X Division Championship match against Rockstar Spud, and after the match, Galloway introduced his two new teammates, the debuting Eli Drake and Micah, announcing the formation of The Rising, and setting the stage of a lengthy rivalry between Rising and BDC. BDC and Rising's feud would continue over the following weeks, leading to Galloway issuing a challenge to Low Ki on the April 24 episode of Impact Wrestling for a Pipe on a Pole match at Hardcore Justice, which was later made official.

On the February 27 episode of Impact Wrestling, BDC attacked Austin Aries after Aries defeated Samoa Joe and stole his Feast or Fired briefcase that contained a contract for a World Heavyweight Championship opportunity anytime and anywhere. Aries would return on the March 20 episode of Impact Wrestling and demand that BDC return the contract but Ki goaded him into a match against Joe. Aries won by disqualification after Ki attacked. Ki and Joe attacked Aries after the match but the attack backfired when Ki tried to hit Aries with the case but Aries avoided it and Joe was accidentally hit with it instead. Aries attacked Ki, allowing Rockstar Spud to cash in his Feast or Fired contract and defeat Ki for the X Division Championship.

Bobby Roode and Eric Young's rivalry continued on the February 13 episode of Impact Wrestling, when Young viciously attacked Roode after Roode defeated Austin Aries and demanded a World Heavyweight Championship rematch against Lashley. Young delivered a piledriver to Roode to injure him. Roode would then take revenge by attacking Young while the latter tried to interfere in Lashley and MVP's World Heavyweight Championship match on the February 27 episode of Impact Wrestling. Roode and Young continued their rivalry, with Roode defeating Young in a last man standing match on the March 13 episode of Impact Wrestling, which Roode won. Young would then defeat Roode in a submission match to conclude the rivalry on the April 3 episode of Impact Wrestling. Young's win over Roode made him the number one contender for the World Heavyweight Championship and he began a rivalry with Kurt Angle over the title, leading to a non-title stretcher match between the two at Hardcore Justice.

Jeff Hardy's fall from the cage onto the steps was widely discussed on the Internet with many wrestlers and fans voicing their concern over his health. However, it was reported that the injury was scripted to write him off from TNA's United Kingdom tour, where it would held television tapings for episodes of Impact! in February and March. Jeff was removed from the UK tour as he was not allowed into the country due to his drug abuse and drug possession issues. He had been similarly removed from TNA's previous UK tours in 2012 and 2013.

Jeff's fall was incorporated into a storyline where his brother Matt Hardy voiced his concern over Jeff's health until The Revolution interrupted him and James Storm gave Matt two options: either join Revolution or join Jeff in the hospital bed. Matt fought them but was outnumbered by Revolution until The Wolves made the save. On the February 20 episode of Impact Wrestling, Matt and Wolves defeated Revolution members Abyss, Storm and Manik by pinning Manik, which resulted in Revolution attacking Manik for losing the match. Matt would then assist Wolves in defeating Revolution to win the World Tag Team Championship on the March 6 episode of Impact Wrestling. Revolution would then continue the rivalry with Hardys, as Storm defeated Matt in a no disqualification match on the March 20 episode of Impact Wrestling, but lost to the returning Jeff in a Six Sides of Steel match on the March 27 episode of Impact Wrestling. Davey Richards would soon join Hardys in the feud with Revolution, leading to a street fight pitting Richards and Hardys against Revolution's Abyss, Manik and Khoya at Hardcore Justice.

EC3 and Tyrus continued to feud with Rockstar Spud, Mandrews and Jeremy Borash after Lockdown, with EC3 expressing his desire to shave off Spud's scalp with a clipper. It led to a handicap match on the February 13 episode of Impact Wrestling, where EC3 and Tyrus defeated Spud, Mandrews and Borash. EC3 tried to shave Spud's hair but Mr. Anderson returned to TNA and made the save. The following week, on Impact Wrestling, EC3 and Tyrus confronted Anderson, Spud and Mandrews, and it culminated in the three attacking Tyrus and shaving his head. Spud and Anderson defeated EC3 and Tyrus on the February 27 episode of Impact Wrestling. EC3 would then conclude his rivalry with Spud by defeating him in a hair versus hair match on the March 13 episode of Impact Wrestling.

== Results ==
No.	Results	Stipulations	Times
1	The Revolution (Abyss and James Storm) (c) defeated The Hardys (Jeff Hardy and Matt Hardy)	Six Sides of Steel match for the TNA World Tag Team Championship	07:57
2	Awesome Kong defeated Havok	Six Sides of Steel match	05:01
3	Bobby Roode defeated Eric Young	Six Sides of Steel match	08:36
4	Tyrus (with Ethan Carter III) defeated Mandrews and Rockstar Spud	Six Sides of Steel match	05:44
5	Team Angle (Kurt Angle, Austin Aries, Gunner and Lashley) defeated The Beat Down Clan (MVP, Kenny King, Samoa Joe and Low Ki)	Lethal Lockdown match	16:03
(c) / – the champion(s) heading into the match
