= TNA Lockdown (2026) =

Professional wrestling event

Lockdown (2026)
- Promotional poster
- Promotion: Total Nonstop Action Wrestling
- Date: August 23, 2026
- City: Chicago, Illinois, U.S.
- Venue: Credit Union 1 Arena
- Attendance: 6,504

Pay-per-view chronology
← Previous; Slammiversary	Next → Bound for Glory

Lockdown chronology
← Previous; 2016	Next → —

The 2026 Lockdown was a professional wrestling pay-per-view (PPV) event produced by Total Nonstop Action Wrestling (TNA). It took place on Sunday, August 23, 2026, at Credit Union 1 Arena in Chicago, Illinois, United States. It was the 13th event under the Lockdown chronology. This event was the first Lockdown since 2016 and the first held as a pay-per-view event since 2014. The event's central theme is that the entire card is contested inside a steel cage. Beyond standard cage matches, the event frequently features specialized variations, most notably the signature Lethal Lockdown match.

Eleven matches were contested at the event, including two on the pre-show and one dark match. In the main event, The Nemeths (TNA World Champion Nic Nemeth and Ryan Nemeth) defeated The Hardys (Matt Hardy and Jeff Hardy) in a Steel Cage tornado tag team match to win the TNA World Tag Team Championship. After the match, Leon Slater – who regained the TNA X-Division Championship against Cedric Alexander in a Last Man Standing Steel Cage match earlier that night – invoked Option C to face Nemeth for the TNA World Championship at Bound for Glory, subsequently vacating the TNA X-Division Championship. In other prominent matches, The System (Eddie Edwards, Brian Myers, Bear Bronson, and Alisha Edwards) defeated Ricky Sosa, Fabian Aichner, KC Navarro, and Jada Stone in a Lethal Lockdown match, and Mustafa Ali defeated Jason Hotch in a Steel Cage match to win the TNA International Championship. The event also featured the TNA return of Kiera Hogan as well as the TNA debut of AJ Styles' son Avery Styles.

== Production ==
=== Background ===
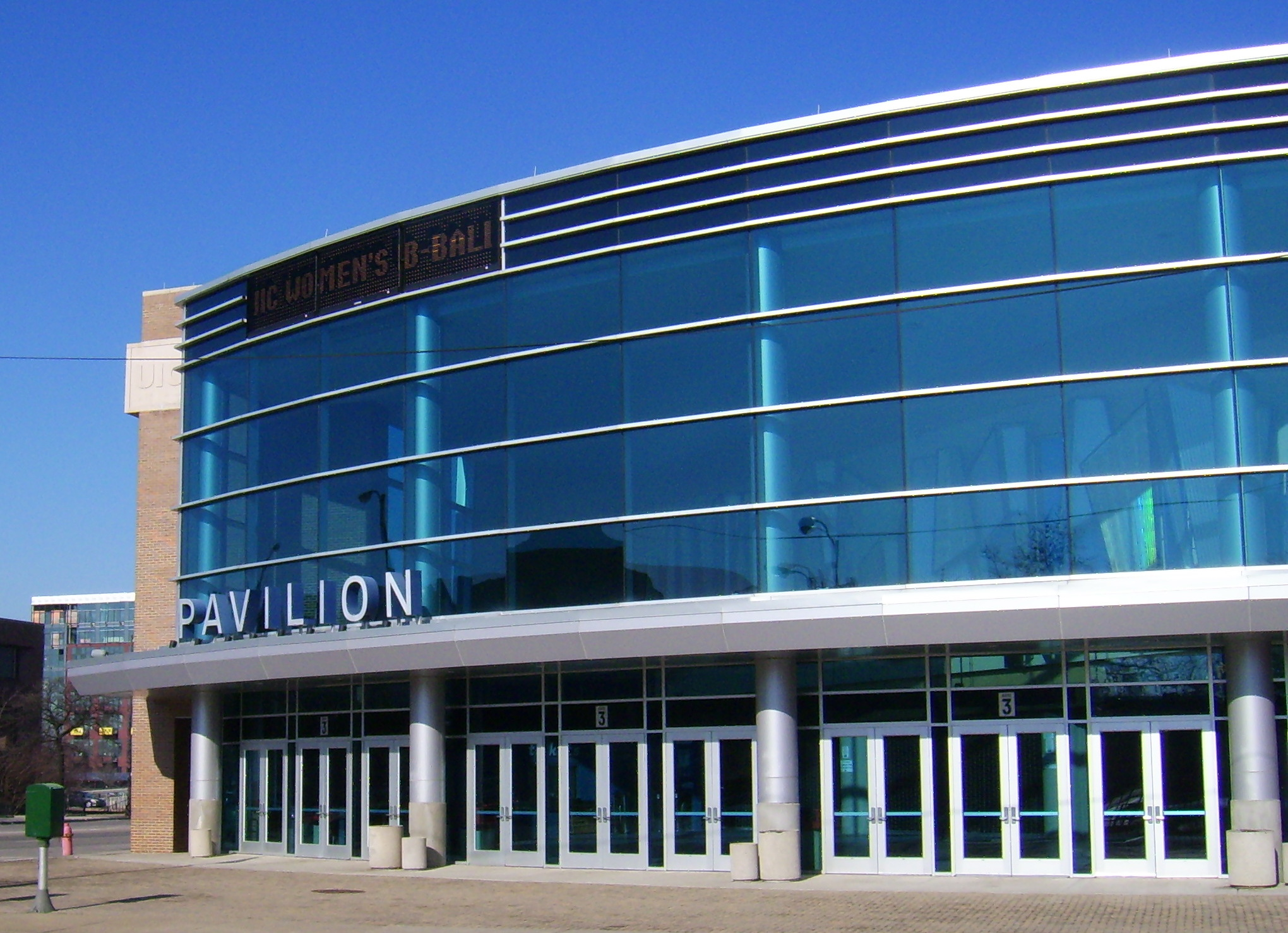
Lockdown took place at Credit Union 1 Arena in Chicago, Illinois, United States.

Lockdown is a professional wrestling pay-per-view (PPV) event produced by Total Nonstop Action Wrestling (TNA). The event was first held in 2005, which was the first professional wrestling pay-per-view event to have every match take place inside a steel cage. In 2013, the promotion scaled back its monthly pay-per-view events in favor of the new pre-recorded One Night Only events. Lockdown would be dropped as a pay-per-view after 2014; it was then held as a special episode of the weekly television program Impact Wrestling in 2015 and 2016 before the event was discontinued. It was set to be revived on March 28, 2020, as a monthly special for Impact Plus at St. Clair College in Windsor, Ontario, Canada, but St. Clair College cancelled all upcoming events, including Lockdown, due to the COVID-19 lockdowns.

On April 16, 2026, TNA announced the return of Lockdown on Sunday, August 23, at Credit Union 1 Arena in Chicago, Illinois, United States. On August 22, TNA announced that Avery Styles, son of former TNA wrestler AJ Styles, would appear at Lockdown.

=== Storylines ===
The event featured professional wrestling matches that involve different wrestlers from pre-existing scripted feuds and storylines. Wrestlers will portray villains, heroes, or less distinguishable characters in scripted events that build tension and culminate in a wrestling match or series of matches.

==== TNA championship matches ====
On the July 30, 2026, episode of Thursday Night Impact!, TNA World Champion Nic Nemeth and Ryan Nemeth declared themselves as the best brother tag team and challenged the TNA World Tag Team Champions The Hardys (Matt Hardy and Jeff Hardy) to a match for the tag team titles at Lockdown. The Hardys immediately agreed to the challenge. TNA Director of Authority Santino Marella made the match official. Per tradition of Lockdown, the match would be a Steel Cage match. Marella also announced that Nic would defend the TNA World Championship against Jeff on a later date. The following week, Matt defeated Ryan as Jeff and Nic brawled on the outside. On the August 13 episode, Nic successfully defended the TNA World Championship against Jeff.

At Slammiversary on June 28, DemonXBunny (Rosemary and Allie) dethroned The Elegance Brand (Heather by Elegance and M by Elegance) to win the TNA Knockouts World Tag Team Championship. Over the following weeks in the first round of the inaugural tournament for the TNA Knockouts Television Championship, Heather and M defeated Allie and Rosemary, respectively. The Elegance Brand received their title rematch on the July 30 episode of Impact!, but Allie defended the title alone in a 2-on-1 handicap match due to the absence of Rosemary. The match ended in a disqualification after Allie began hitting The Elegance Brand, including Mr. Elegance, with the title belt. Thus, DemonXBunny retained the title. Later that night, TNA Director of Operations Daria Rae announced a Steel Cage match between DemonXBunny and The Elegance Brand for the TNA Knockouts World Tag Team Championship at Lockdown. On August 20, TNA announced that Allie would have a mystery partner in her title defense against The Elegance Brand at Lockdown due to the absence of Rosemary.

On the July 23 episode of Impact!, TNA International Champion Mustafa Ali of Order 4 held a vote to determine the number one contender for his title. Ali berated Order 4 member John Skyler when he tried to tally the votes, accusing him of ruining the voting integrity. TNA Director of Operations Daria Rae announced the winner of the vote: Order 4's Jason Hotch. Ali laughed the results off, claiming it as a prank by the locker room and subsequently instructing Hotch to demand Rae to initiate a revote. However, Hotch chose to keep his title opportunity after talking with his family and Leon Slater, which enraged Ali. In their title match the following week, Ali attacked Hotch with his belt, which prompted Skyler to take the belt off of Ali. When Ali illegally used the ropes as leverage to pin Hotch, Order 4 member Tasha Steelz pushed Ali's feet off the ropes. After fellow Order 4 member Mila Moore confronted Steelz, the two women had a fight; Skyler and Order 4 member Special Agent 0 pulled them away from each other and brought them backstage. Afterwards, Hotch attacked and pinned Ali to win the TNA International Championship with his family in attendance. The following week, Ali told Hotch's wife that he was happy that Hotch won the title but was upset that Hotch did it against him. He then promised to take care of her and her child regardless of what would happen to Hotch before inappropriately placing his hand on her knee. Later that night, Hotch confronted Ali for his inappropriate actions towards his wife. He then declared that he would defend his title against Ali in a Steel Cage match at Lockdown and decided to leave Order 4. He then asked his The Great Hands tag team partner, Skyler, to leave with him, but Skyler refused, claiming that he needed the job. On the August 20 episode, Ali announced that Skyler would challenge Hotch for the TNA International Championship as a test of loyalty towards Order 4, and Rae forced Hotch to defend his title against Skyler, threatening to strip the title off of him if he objected. Their match took place, but it ended in a no contest after Agent 0 attacked Hotch.

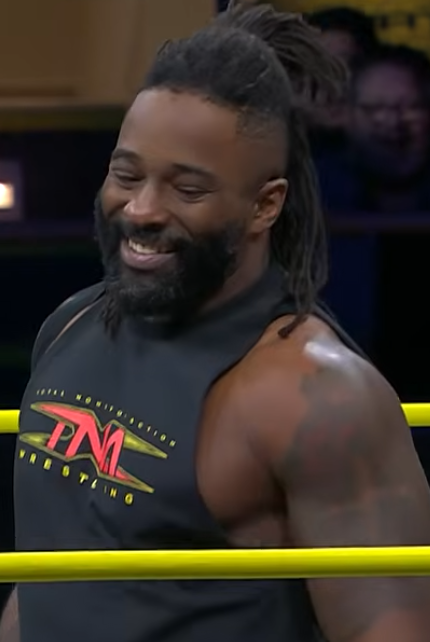
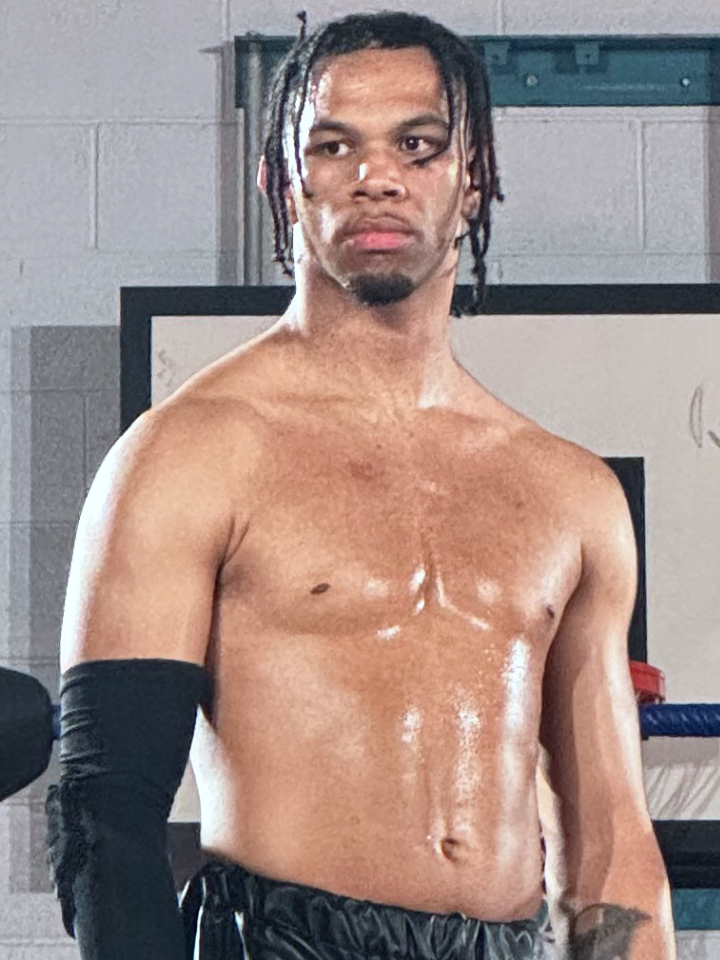
Cedric Alexander defended the TNA X Division Championship against Leon Slater in a Last Man Standing Steel Cage match, where if Slater lost, his record-tying 298-day reign as TNA X Division Champion would have been erased from history.

On the May 14 episode of Impact!, The System's Cedric Alexander ended Leon Slater's record-tying 298-day reign as TNA X Division Champion in a 2-out-of-3 Falls match by winning two falls to one. At Slammiversary on June 28, Alexander defended his title in a seven-man Ultimate X match that also included Slater. When Slater and Amazing Red simultaneously unhooked the title belt, Alexander grabbed the title off of their hands to retain his title. Over the following weeks, Slater began a partnership with Ricky Sosa against The System, including helping Fabian Aichner fend off The System's attack. On the July 30 episode, Slater and Sosa defeated The System's Alexander and Eddie Edwards after Slater pinned Alexander. After the match Slater demanded a shot at the TNA X Division Championship which Alexander later declined. When KC Navarro confronted The System, he suffered an attack from The System; Slater, Sosa, and Aichner then came out to help Navarro. The following week, TNA commentator Tom Hannifan interviewed Slater and Alexander, who disliked the fans calling Slater the "greatest X Division Champion". After Hannifan left per Slater's request, Alexander said that he worked hard to become champion while Slater was handed everything to him. He added that Slater would not get a title shot while he is the champion and vowed to erase Slater's accomplishments from history. On the August 13 episode, Slater prevented The System's Brian Myers from cheating to help Sosa gain a victory against Myers. After the match, Slater offered Alexander anything for a title shot at Lockdown. Alexander chose to have Slater's record-tying 298-day reign as the TNA X Division Champion erased from history if Slater loses at Lockdown; Slater accepted the stipulation to make the match official. The following week, TNA added a Last Man Standing stipulation to the match.

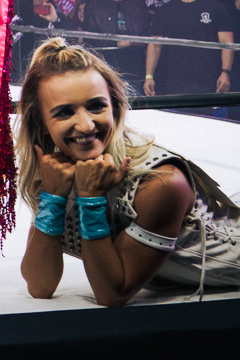
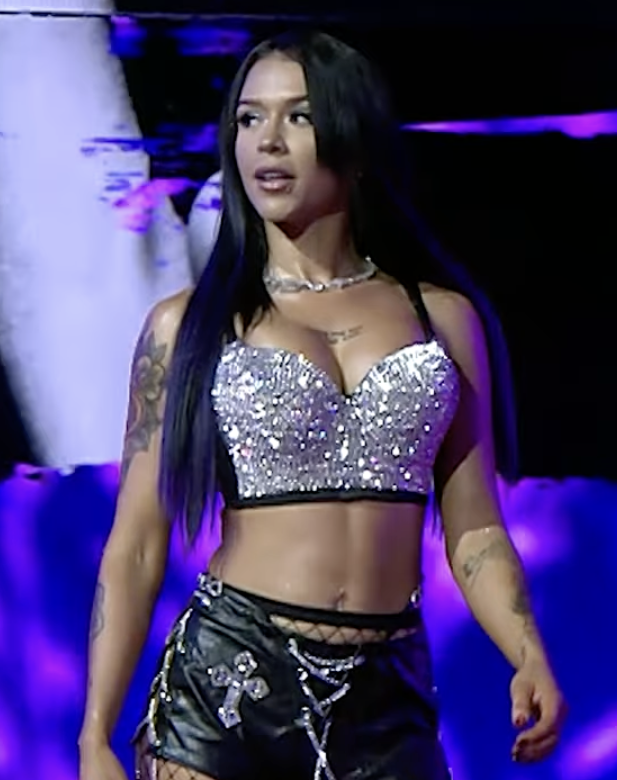
Xia Brookside defended the TNA Knockouts World Championship in a Steel Cage match against Chicago-native Elayna Black.

On the July 16 episode of Impact!, TNA Knockouts World Champion Xia Brookside had an issue with Elayna Black's goal to become the greatest Knockout of all-time, stating that she had beaten everyone she faced. Black claimed that Brookside was afraid and envious of her. In the following week, after Black's first round match against the inaugural TNA Knockouts Television Championship against Wendy Choo ended in a time limit draw, Brookside threw Black and Choo into the steel steps. On the August 6 episode, Brookside successfully defended her title against Choo. After the match. Later that night, Black declared that she would fight Brookside for the title at Lockdown in her hometown of Chicago. Per tradition of Lockdown, the match would be a Steel Cage match.

==== Other matches ====
At Slammiversary, Elijah defeated A. J. Francis to reclaim the rights to his name, likeness, and music catalog. On the July 23 episode of Impact!, Francis and Frankie Kazarian defeated Elijah and Moose after Francis' manager Expressions caused Elijah to fall off the ropes and get hit and pinned by Francis. After the match, Expressions tried to hit Elijah with a guitar, but Moose stopped him and Elijah before Elijah and him attacked Expressions instead. The following week, Francis solicited money for Expression's medical bills from various wrestlers, including Elijah, who did not make a donation as he accused of Francis being a hypocrite who wears expensive shoes. Francis then challenged Elijah to a Steel Cage match at Lockdown, which Elijah accepted.

On the July 16 episode of Impact!, Frankie Kazarian attacked Moose in his match against A. J. Francis. After the match, Kazarian continued to attack Moose before giving Francis and Expressions a turn. Moose later invited Elijah to battle Kazarian and Francis the following week, but they lost after an interference by Expressions. On the August 6 episode, Moose claimed that Kazarian did not earn the "King of TNA" nickname. He then challenged Kazarian to a match at Lockdown; Kazarian later accepted the challenge under the condition that it would be an Escape the Cage match. The following week, Moose impersonated Kazarian, mimicking his attire and talk show, before a brawl ensued between Moose and Kazarian. Later that night, Moose was found unconscious on the floor backstage.

On the July 2 episode of Impact!, Fabian Aichner was victorious in a six-way match to become the number one contender to The System's Cedric Alexander for the TNA X Division Championship. Later that night, Ricky Sosa declined the offer to join The System, which prompted an attack on Sosa. Leon Slater came out to help Sosa but he was unsuccessful. The following week, Sosa and Slater defeated The System's Bear Bronson and Brian Myers and The Righteous (Vincent and Dutch) in a three-way tag team match. On the July 16 episode, Bronson gained a victory over Sosa with the assistance of Myers, and Aichner failed to dethrone Alexander for the TNA X Division Championship after Edwards cost him the match. After the match, Bronson and Eddie Edwards kept attacking Aichner until Sosa and Slater came to successfully save him from The System's attack. The following week, Slater and Sosa defeated The System's Alexander and Edwards and they later helped KC Navarro against The System. Later that night, Jada Stone eliminated The System's Alisha Edwards in the first round of the inaugural TNA Knockouts Television Championship tournament, overcoming Eddie's attempt at interfering in their match. On the August 6 episode, a match between Navarro and Myers occurred, where Bronson was ejected after being caught interfering in the match. Sosa then came out to attack Bronson with a steel chair. The match ended in a disqualification after Eddie attacked Navarro in the ring. Aichner then came out to help Navarro against Eddie and Myers. TNA Director of Authority Santino Marella restarted the match as a tag team match between the team of Navarro and Aichner and The System's Eddie and Myers. Alisha later handed Eddie a kendo stick, which Eddie used to hit Navarro outside the referee's field of vision to get the victory. Sosa then appeared again to attack The System with a steel chair. The following week, Sosa defeated Myers after Slater prevented Myers from illegally using the TNA X Division Championship belt. Later that night, Navarro defeated Eddie after stopping Eddie from illegally using a kendo stick. After the match, The System began attacking Navarro until Sosa, Aichner, and Stone came out to save Navarro. Marella then announced a Lethal Lockdown match at Lockdown, pitting the team of Sosa, Aichner, Navarro, and Stone against The System (Eddie, Bronson, Myers, and Alisha). On the August 20 episode, Myers defeated Aichner to earn the advantage for The System in their upcoming match at Lockdown.

On the August 6 episode of Impact!, The Righteous (Vincent and Dutch) said that they were moving on from their feud with The Hardys and that they were searching for struggling wrestlers who have the potential to achieve greater success. Two weeks later, after Rich Swann defeated Mr. Elegance with BDE in Swann's corner, The Righteous appeared to scout BDE. Later that night, TNA announced The Righteous versus BDE and Swann on the Countdown to Lockdown.

On the August 13 episode of Impact!, Trey Miguel appeared as BDE and Rich Swann's mystery partner against Order 4 (Mustafa Ali, John Skyler, and Special Agent 0), where Miguel pinned Skyler to get the victory. Following the match, Agent 0 attacked Miguel. When Agent 0 attempted another attack on Miguel upon Ali's request, TNA International Champion Jason Hotch came out to successfully stop Order 4. The following week, TNA announced Agent 0 versus Miguel for the Countdown to Lockdown.

On August 22, TNA Director of Authority Santino Marella announced that Joe Alonzo would defend the AAW Heavyweight Championship against The Home Town Man in a dark match at Lockdown. He added that if Alonzo wins, he would earn a contract with TNA.

== Event ==
Other on-screen personnel
Role	Name
Commentators	Tom Hannifan
Commentators	Matthew Rehwoldt
Referees	Daniel Spencer
Referees	Frank Gastineau
Referees	Michael Romo
Referees	Paige Prinzivalli
Interviewer	Gia Miller
Pre-show panel	Tom Hannifan
Pre-show panel	Matthew Rehwoldt
Pre-show panel	Daria Rae
Pre-show panel	Candice Michelle
Pre-show panel	Ace Steel

=== Pre-show ===
The pre-show opened with BDE and Rich Swann versus The Righteous (Vincent and Dutch). When BDE climbed to the top turnbuckle, Dutch shoved him off of it and then tackled Swann into the announce table. Vincent then performed a springboard bulldog on BDE, in which Vincent grabbed BDE's head before bouncing off the ropes to drive his head into the mat, to get the pinfall victory.

Next, Trey Miguel battled Special Agent 0, where Miguel won via roll-up, rolling backwards to position himself on top of Agent 0's legs while Agent 0's shoulders were down on the mat.

=== Preliminary matches ===
The main card opened with A. J. Francis versus Elijah in a Steel Cage match, where the wrestlers were trapped in a ring surrounded by steel bars and the only ways to win were via pinfall or submission. After they attacked each other off the top of the cage, Francis' manager Expressions came out to ringside on a wheelchair. Francis ordered the referee to open the cage door, but he could not win by escaping. Elijah then dragged Francis back inside for an attack. When Elijah tried to close the door, Expressions slammed it into Elijah's face; he would then reveal that he was not injured. After Elijah executed a "Canadian Destroyer" on Francis, in which Elijah grabbed a bent-down Francis as he front flipped over Francis' back to slam Francis down the mat back-first, Elijah attempted a pinfall but it was voided by Expressions. Elijah retaliated by repeatedly slamming Expressions against the cage and executing a "Tombstone Piledriver" on Expressions, positioning Expressions upside down before kneeling down to slam Expression down head-first. Francis took advantage by executing a moonsault, in which Francis backflipped off the top rope onto Elijah. Francis then followed up with the "The Down Payment", in which Francis lifted Elijah up by his neck before slamming him down back-first, before pinning him to get the victory. Following the match, The Home Town Man handed Elijah a guitar, which he used to hit Francis' head as he dove off of the top rope.

The next match was a Steel Cage tag team match, where The Elegance Brand (Heather by Elegance and M by Elegance) (accompanied by Mr. Elegance and The Personal Concierge) challenged for the TNA Knockouts World Tag Team Championship against Allie and her mystery partner, which would be revealed to be the returning Kiera Hogan. Standard tag team rules applied inside the steel cage in this match. When Mr. Elegance tried to climb the cage, it distracted Allie, which led to Heather hitting Allie with a baton. Concierge later grabbed handcuffs, and then Heather got out of the cage by slipping through the metal bars to handcuff Allie to the steel cage. As Allie managed to escape from the handcuffs, Hogan performed a "Paige Turner", in which Hogan hooked M's head before hooking M's leg as Hogan fell backward to pull M backward down the mat. Hogan then pinned M to retain the titles.

The third match was an Escape the Cage match between Frankie Kazarian and Moose, where the first competitor to land on the outside would win the match. Kazarian immediately made escape attempts, but Moose prevented him. The two competitors later climbed to the top of the cage, which led to Moose executing a Spanish fly on Kazarian off of the top of the cage, in which Moose grabbed Kazarian while facing opposite directions before doing a backflip to slam Kazarian down back-first. After Kazarian countered Moose's attack, he dragged himself to stand up next to the cage door, opening the opportunity for Moose to execute a spear on Kazarian, driving his shoulder into Kazarian's midsection to force Kazarian to fall backwards. Although. Moose's spear drove Kazarian through the cage door, which led to Kazarian landing on the ground, and thus, Kazarian won the match.

The fourth match saw Xia Brookside defending the TNA Knockouts World Championship against Cora Jade in a Steel Cage match. Brookside repeatedly punched a bloodied Black with a belt and struck Black's head with the belt's prong. Brookside then licked Black's blood on her hand. Brookside trapped Black against the cage; Black's face was covered with blood. Brookside countered Black's attack with the "Darkside DDT", in which Brookside grabbed Black's head, lifted her up, and then fell backwards to drive her head into the mat, for a near-fall, an event that had not occurred in the past. Black then executed the "Blackout" on Brookside, in which Black hooked Brookside's arms before lifting and rotating her back down, for a near-fall. Brookside grabbed powder which she threw at Black before executing a roll-up to get the pinfall victory and retain her title.

Next, Jason Hotch defended the TNA International Championship against Mustafa Ali (accompanied by his Order 4 members John Skyler, Mila Moore, Tasha Steelz, Special Agent 0, and the Secret Service) in a Steel Cage match. Agent 0 later opened the cage door, but Steelz slammed it shut, which prompted Moore to confront Steelz and Steelz hitting Moore. When Hotch went after Ali, he accidentally knocked Steelz out instead, and then Skyler carried the unconscious Steelz backstage. After Hotch knocked Ali to ringside, Hotch climbed to the top of the cage before diving off of it to land on Ali through a table. Hotch began spitting out blood, and then Ali stole a plushie from Hotch's daughter in the crowd. Moore then gave Ali a lighter to try to burn the plushie, but Hotch took him down before Ali could do it. Ali responded by whipping Hotch's chest with Hotch's belt while Hotch was trapped upside down. When Ali and Hotch were on the top rope, Hotch shoved him off before proceeding to climb to the top of the cage and diving off of it onto Ali. After recovering, Ali placed the plushie on Hotch's chest before executing a 450° splash on Hotch, in which Ali jumped off the top rope to execute a front somersault with 1.5 rotations and then onto a supine Hotch, but Hotch kicked out of the ensuing pinfall attempt. Ali then attempted another 450° splash to get the pinfall victory and win the title. Following the match, Skyler checked on Hotch as Moore and Agent 0 carried Ali backstage. Hotch limped as he walked over to his crying daughter to return her plushie. Skyler then helped Hotch go backstage.

A segment followed in which TNA interviewer Gia Miller introduced Avery Styles, the son of former TNA wrestler AJ Styles. Avery stated his intent to follow his father's footsteps by signing with TNA. Frankie Kazarian then welcomed Avery. Kazarian stated his close connection with Avery's father and that he, AJ, Samoa Joe, and Christopher Daniels built TNA. He then warned Avery to not trust anyone in the roster except him.

Next, Cedric Alexander defended the TNA X Division Championship against Leon Slater in a Last Man Standing Steel Cage match, where if Slater lost, his reign as TNA X Division Champion would have been unrecognized. The winner of the match was the first competitor to knock down their opponent for a count of 10. Alexander threw Slater into the cage wall, which caused Slater's head to start bleeding. Slater later reciprocated by pressing Alexander against the cage wall to cause him to bleed. After a series of offensive exchanges, Alexander and Slater used each other to stand up and beat the 10 count. Slater later performed on Alexander three "Lumbar Checks", in which Slater brought Alexander's back down onto Slater's knees, and a Swanton 450, in which Slater dove off the top rope with his arms outstretched before doing a front somersault with 1.5 rotations onto Alexander. The referee began counting, and Alexander could not stand up before the ten count. Thus, Slater won the match and the TNA X Division Championship.

The penultimate match was the Lethal Lockdown match, where The System (Eddie Edwards, Bear Bronson, Brian Myers, and Alisha Edwards) faced off against Ricky Sosa, Fabian Aichner, KC Navarro, and Jada Stone. In this variation of a Steel Cage match, two wrestlers started the match with the other wrestlers entering individually in regular intervals. When all competitors entered the cage, the cage's roof with attached weapons was lowered onto the cage to officially start the match, where the only ways to win are pinfall or submission. Because The System earned the advantage, their members entered first before each member of the opposing team. Bronson and Aichner began the match; Myers, Navarro, Eddie, Sosa, Alisha, and Stone followed. Stone entered the cage by climbing to the top and executing a moonsault off the top of the cage onto other competitors. Bronson tossed chairs into the ring, and the roof of the cage was lowered to mark the official start of the match. Sosa, Aichner, Navarro, and Stone each grabbed weapons off the roof to attack The System. Alasha hit Navarro, Sosa, and Aichner's groins to help Eddie. Stone then attacked ALisha with a kendo stick and poured out thumbtacks onto the mat. Stone executed a superplex on Alisha, in which Stone lifted Alisha from the top rope up to over her shoulders before falling backwards, onto the thumbtacks. Aichner then placed a trash can on Eddie's head before jumping off the other side of the ring to kick the trash can and Eddie's head. Bronson then attacked Aichner and Navarro with a barbed wire bat. Bronson attempted to send Navarro through a barbed wire table, but Sosa sent Bronson through the barbed wire table instead. After Myers attacked Navarro, Sosa executed the "Blue Thunder Bang" on Myers, in which Sosa lifted Myers up, spun around, and then slammed Myers down back-first, onto the thumbtacks. After Sosa hit Myers' head with barbed wire, Sosa attempted a pinfall but Alisha voided it. Eddie then executed the "Boston Knee Party" on Sosa, in which Eddie struck Sosa's head with his knee, and then followed up with a package piledriver, in which Eddie lifted Sosa up until Sosa was upside down before sitting down with Sosa's head between Eddie's thighs, onto open chairs. Eddie then pinned Sosa to get the victory.

=== Main event ===
The main event was The Hardys (Matt Hardy and Jeff Hardy) defending the TNA World Tag Team Championship against The Nemeths (TNA World Champion Nic Nemeth and Ryan Nemeth) in a Steel Cage tornado tag team match, where tags were not required and the only ways to win were via pinfall or submission. After Ryan kicked Matt's groin, Ryan attempted a pinfall that was voided by Jeff. The Nemeths attacked Jeff for a near-fall. Matt blocked Nic's kick and then attacked The Nemeths. Matt then placed Ryan on a table before climbing to the top of the cage, but Nic recovered and saved Ryan. Jeff and Nic later caused each other to lose their balance on the ropes, causing each other to land their groins on the top rope. Matt then performed the "Twist of Fate" on Ryan, in which Matt grabbed Ryan's head with his arm before rotating 180°, grabbing Ryan's head with his other arm, and before falling down to pull Ryan down face-first. After Ryan stumbled onto a table, Matt climbed halfway up the cage and then dropped his elbow onto Ryan through the table. Nic then executed the "Danger Zone" on Matt, in which Nic pulled Matt from behind to force him to fall backwards, before pinning Matt to win the titles.

Following the match, the new TNA X Division Champion Leon Slater interrupted The Nemeth's champagne celebration. Slater announced his intent to invoke Option C to face Nic Nemeth for the TNA World Championship at Bound for Glory and become the youngest world champion in the history of TNA. Slater then voluntarily relinquished the TNA X Division Championship to TNA President Carlos Silva to make it official. Nic tried to ambush Slater, but he responded by kicking down The Nemeths. Slater then posed with the TNA World Championship belt as the event ended.

== Reception ==
Dave Meltzer of the Wrestling Observer Newsletter gave Elijah vs. A. J. Francis 3 stars, the TNA Knockouts World Tag Team Championship match 1.5 stars, Frankie Kazarian vs. Moose 3.25 stars, the TNA Knockouts World Championship 2.75 stars, the TNA International Championship match 4 stars, the TNA X Division Championship match 3.75 stars, and the Lethal Lockdown match 4 stars.

== Results ==
No.	Results	Stipulations	Times
1^{D}	Joe Alonzo (c) defeated The Home Town Man by pinfall	Singles match for the AAW Heavyweight Championship; Since Alonzo won, he earned a TNA contract.	—
2^{P}	The Righteous (Vincent and Dutch) defeated BDE and Rich Swann by pinfall	Tag team match	7:52
3^{P}	Trey Miguel defeated Special Agent 0 by pinfall	Singles match	5:12
4	A. J. Francis defeated Elijah by pinfall	Steel Cage match	13:29
5	Allie and Kiera Hogan (Note: DemonXBunny (Rosemary and Allie) were scheduled to defend the title against The Elegance Brand at Lockdown, but due to Rosemary's absence, TNA announced that Allie would defend the title with a mystery partner.) (c) defeated The Elegance Brand (Heather by Elegance and M by Elegance) (with Mr. Elegance and The Personal Concierge) by pinfall	Steel Cage tag team match for the TNA Knockouts World Tag Team Championship	7:35
6	Frankie Kazarian defeated Moose	Escape the Cage match	14:15
7	Xia Brookside (c) defeated Elayna Black by pinfall	Steel Cage match for the TNA Knockouts World Championship	12:54
8	Mustafa Ali (with John Skyler, Special Agent 0, Mila Moore, and Tasha Steelz) defeated Jason Hotch (c) by pinfall	Steel Cage match for the TNA International Championship	14:17
9	Leon Slater defeated Cedric Alexander (c)	Last Man Standing Steel Cage match for the TNA X Division Championship; Had Slater lost, his previous title reign would have been erased from history.	13:15
10	The System (Eddie Edwards, Brian Myers, Bear Bronson, and Alisha Edwards) defeated Ricky Sosa, Fabian Aichner, KC Navarro, and Jada Stone by pinfall (Note: Order of entry: Bear Bronson, Fabian Aichner, Brian Myers, KC Navarro, Eddie Edwards, Ricky Sosa, Alisha Edwards, Jada Stone)	Lethal Lockdown match	17:42
11	The Nemeths (Nic Nemeth and Ryan Nemeth) defeated The Hardys (Matt Hardy and Jeff Hardy) (c) by pinfall	Steel Cage tornado tag team match for the TNA World Tag Team Championship	11:58
(c) / – the champion(s) heading into the match; D / – this was a dark match; P / – the match was broadcast on the pre-show
