= TNA Lockdown (2014) =

2014 Total Nonstop Action Wrestling pay-per-view event

Lockdown (2014)
- Promotional poster featuring Magnus holding the TNA World Heavyweight Championship
- Promotion: Total Nonstop Action Wrestling
- Date: March 9, 2014
- City: Coral Gables, Florida
- Venue: BankUnited Center

Pay-per-view chronology
← Previous; Bound for Glory	Next → Sacrifice

Lockdown chronology
← Previous; 2013	Next → 2015

The 2014 Lockdown was a professional wrestling pay-per-view event produced by the Total Nonstop Action Wrestling (TNA) promotion, which took place on March 9, 2014 at the BankUnited Center in Coral Gables, Florida. It was the tenth event under the Lockdown name and first event in the 2014 TNA PPV schedule.

In October 2017, with the launch of the Global Wrestling Network, the event became available to stream on demand.

== Productions ==
=== Background ===
From 2005 to 2012, the tradition of Lockdown events featured every match taking place inside a steel cage. However, in 2013, Lockdown was modified to featuring standard matches and cage matches were reserved only for the high-profile bouts. This year Lockdown returned to being an all steel cage event.

=== Storylines ===
Lockdown featured seven professional wrestling matches that involved different wrestlers from pre-existing scripted feuds and storylines. Wrestlers portrayed villains, heroes, or less distinguishable characters in the scripted events that built tension and culminated in a wrestling match or series of matches.

After A.J. Styles won the TNA World Heavyweight Championship at Bound for Glory, he was stripped of the title after walking out of the company. TNA then began a World Title tournament to crown a new champion, with Magnus prevailing. Styles returned on the January 2, 2014 edition of Impact Wrestling still claiming to be the legitimate champion as he was never defeated for the title. He then lost to Magnus due to TNA President Dixie Carter directing a heavy amount of interference against Styles, making Magnus undisputed champion. Samoa Joe then stepped up to challenge Magnus, labeling him a "paper champion". On the January 30 edition of Impact Wrestling, Samoa Joe and Kurt Angle defeated Magnus and Ethan Carter III in a stipulated tag match. In the match, Joe forced Magnus to tap out and as a result of the stipulation put in place, he would receive a shot at the World Title.

Dixie Carter caught wind that a new investor was involved with TNA. The investor was revealed on the January 30, 2014 episode of Impact Wrestling to be MVP. In the following weeks, MVP explained that he had bought shares of the company through the TNA Board of Directors. Intending to clean up the company from the mess he felt Carter was making, MVP proposed they assembled their teams to compete in a Lethal Lockdown match to decide who gains full control, which Carter accepted.

Madison Rayne returned to TNA on the December 12, 2013 edition of Impact Wrestling, saving ODB and embroiling in a feud with Gail Kim and her associate, Lei'D Tapa. The feud progressed a month later with Rayne earning a shot at the TNA Women's Knockout Championship held then by Kim before defeating her to become the new champion. After Kim gained a non-title win against Rayne a month later, she became entitled to a championship rematch at Lockdown.

After losing the Tag Team Championships, James Storm began a feud with Gunner when Gunner pulled the Feast or Fired briefcase from Storm, which contained the World Heavyweight Championship match. On the January 2 episode of Impact Wrestling, for the first time in over two years, James Storm teamed with his former Beer Money partner, Bobby Roode, to defeat Gunner and Kurt Angle in a tag team match. After the match, Storm further taunted Gunner. On the January 23 special episode of Impact Wrestling, Gunner beat Storm in a ladder match with his Feast or Fired briefcase on the line. On the January 30th episode of Impact Wrestling, Storm apologized to Gunner for his previous actions, and later won a tag team match that night with Gunner against Bad Influence. On the February 20 episode of Impact Wrestling, Storm cost Gunner his Feast or Fired match against Magnus for the World Heavyweight Championship, turning heel in the process and setting a steel cage match between the two at Lockdown.

Other on-screen personnel
Commentator	Mike Tenay
Commentator	Taz
Ring announcers	Jeremy Borash
Ring announcers	Christy Hemme (only the six-man tag match)
Referees	Brian Hebner
Referees	Brian Stiffler
Interviewer	Jeremy Borash

At Turning Point, Samuel Shaw appeared in an at home interview with Christy Hemme. On the January 2, 2014 episode of Impact Wrestling, Shaw made his debut by defeating Norv Fernum via submission, during which he made continuous glares at Hemme who was at ringside. Shaw later became an obsessed fan of Hemme, and started asking her on dates, including one in his house where it was shown how Shaw had a room full of posters and pictures of Hemme. On the February 6 episode of Impact Wrestling, Hemme confronted Shaw about the mannequin and the room full of posters. On the February 20th Impact Wrestling, Shaw would attack Mr. Anderson in a rage after watching Hemme and Anderson converse for several minutes. Shaw then carried Hemme away after she was accidentally caught up in the ruckus and injured.

As part of a talent exchange partnership between TNA and Japan based promotion Wrestle-1, Wrestle-1 founder/owner and Japanese wrestling legend Keiji Mutoh (The Great Muta) and fellow Wrestle-1 stars Yasu and Seiya Sanada (who became TNA X Division Champion on March 2, 2014 at the Kaisen: Outbreak show in Tokyo, Japan) took part in the event, facing TNA veterans Bad Influence (Christopher Daniels and Kazarian) and Chris Sabin in a six-man cage match. The match marks the start of an indefinite TNA stay for Sanada.

New TNA acquisition Tigre Uno will make his TNA debut at the event, wrestling Manik in a steel cage match.

On January 30, 2014, Samoa Joe and Kurt Angle defeated TNA World Champion Magnus and Ethan Carter III (EC3). On February 6, 2014, Angle had a match against Magnus. However, he won by DQ, when EC3 attacked him, performing a leglock, which injured his knee. On February 27, 2014, Angle officially accepted his induction into the TNA Hall of Fame, but the ceremony was interrupted by EC3, who said he tore Angle's knee ligaments and therefore must retire. However, Angle attacked him and challenged him a match at LockDown. On March 7, 2014, Angle was attacked again by EC3. It was announced after that night's Impact that Kurt Angle, due EC3's attack, would be pulled from the Lockdown card due to a torn MCL. On March 9 at Lockdown EC3 issued an open challenge that was answered by the returning Bobby Lashley.

== Reception ==
The TNA title match was rated two and a half stars by James Cadwell, from PWTorch. He said about the Abyss interference "Abyss's unintentionally comedic hand-through-the-ring spot that didn't quite go according to plan." Nolan Howell, from CANOE Slam, rated the match with minus one star.

== Results ==
No.	Results	Stipulations	Times
1	The Great Muta, Sanada and Yasu defeated Bad Influence (Christopher Daniels and Kazarian) and Chris Sabin	Steel Cage match	09:25
2	Samuel Shaw defeated Mr. Anderson	Steel Cage match	10:09
3	Tigre Uno defeated Manik	Steel Cage match	07:42
4	Gunner defeated James Storm	Steel Cage Last Man Standing match	12:25
5	Madison Rayne (c) defeated Gail Kim (with Lei'D Tapa)	Steel Cage match for the TNA Women's Knockout Championship	06:30
6	Magnus (c) defeated Samoa Joe	Steel Cage match for the TNA World Heavyweight Championship	19:21
7	Team MVP (MVP, The Wolves (Davey Richards and Eddie Edwards) and Willow) defeated Team Dixie (Bobby Roode, The BroMans (Jessie Godderz and Robbie E) and Austin Aries) (with Dixie Carter, DJZ and Rockstar Spud)	Lethal Lockdown match with Bully Ray as special guest referee Leader of winning team receives 100% control of Wrestling Operations; Had Team Dixie won, Roode would've gained 10% ownership of TNA	26:09
(c) / – the champion(s) heading into the match

== See also ==
- 2014 in professional wrestling
