= Lethal Lockdown match =

Professional wrestling match type

A Lethal Lockdown match is a professional wrestling match used in Total Nonstop Action Wrestling (TNA). This match has become a staple of TNA's Lockdown pay-per-view event, but has also made appearances at other TNA pay-per-views, and during Impact! TV broadcasts.

== Match format ==
The match consists of a single ring enclosed by a steel cage with two teams facing off with each other. One member from each team begins, and at certain intervals the other team members enter one at a time, thus giving one team an advantage where they outnumber their opponents during certain periods until all team members have entered.

The staggered entry system is similar to WWE's WarGames match, and AEW's Blood & Guts match, with weapons permitted and even provided. When all competitors have entered the ring, a roof is lowered onto the top of the cage, with various weapons hanging from it. Victory can be attained by pinfall or submission.

== Matches ==
#	Winners	Losers	Event	Date	Location	Ref
1	Team Nash (BG James, Diamond Dallas Page, and Sean Waltman)	Team Jarrett (Jeff Jarrett, The Outlaw, and Monty Brown)	Lockdown	April 24, 2005	Orlando, FL, U.S.	
2	Sting's Warriors (Sting, AJ Styles, Ron Killings, and Rhino)	Jeff Jarrett's Army (Jeff Jarrett, Scott Steiner, Chris Harris, and James Storm)	Lockdown	April 23, 2006	Orlando, FL, U.S.	
3 (Note: Harley Race was the special enforcer.)	Team Angle (Kurt Angle, Samoa Joe, Rhino, Sting, and Jeff Jarrett)	Team Cage (Christian Cage, AJ Styles, Scott Steiner, Abyss, and Tomko)	Lockdown	April 15, 2007	St. Charles, MO, U.S.	
4	Team Cage (Christian Cage, Kevin Nash, Matt Morgan, Rhino, and Sting)	Team Tomko (Tomko, A.J. Styles, James Storm, and Team 3D (Brother Devon and Brother Ray)	Lockdown	April 13, 2008	Lowell, MA, U.S.	
5	Team Jarrett (Jeff Jarrett, A.J. Styles, Christopher Daniels, and Samoa Joe)	Team Angle (Kurt Angle, Booker T, Kevin Nash, and Scott Steiner)	Lockdown	April 19, 2009	Philadelphia, PA, U.S.	
6	Beer Money, Inc. and Team 3D (James Storm and Robert Roode) and (Brother Devon and Brother Ray)	The Main Event Mafia and The British Invasion (Booker T and Scott Steiner) and (Brutus Magnus and Doug Williams)	No Surrender	September 20, 2009	Orlando, FL, U.S.	
7	Team Hogan (Abyss, Jeff Hardy, Jeff Jarrett, and Rob Van Dam)	Team Flair (Desmond Wolfe, James Storm, Robert Roode, and Sting)	Lockdown	April 18, 2010	St. Charles, MO, U.S.	
8	EV 2.0 (Raven, Rhino, Sabu, Stevie Richards, and Tommy Dreamer)	Fortune (A.J. Styles, James Storm, Kazarian, Matt Morgan, and Robert Roode)	Bound for Glory	October 10, 2010	Daytona Beach, FL, U.S.	
9	Fortune (Christopher Daniels, James Storm, Kazarian, and Robert Roode)	Immortal (Abyss, Bully Ray, Matt Hardy, and Ric Flair)	Lockdown	April 17, 2011	Cincinnati, OH, U.S.	
10 (Note: This was also a Loser Leaves TNA match.)	Team Garett Bischoff (A.J. Styles, Austin Aries, Garett Bischoff, Mr. Anderson, and Rob Van Dam)	Team Eric Bischoff (Bully Ray, Christopher Daniels, Eric Bischoff, Gunner, and Kazarian)	Lockdown	April 15, 2012	Nashville, TN, U.S.	
11	Team TNA (Eric Young, James Storm, Magnus, Samoa Joe, and Sting)	Aces & Eights (Devon, D.O.C., Garett Bischoff, Knux, and Mr. Anderson)	Lockdown	March 10, 2013	San Antonio, TX, U.S.	
12	Team Angle (Kurt Angle, Samoa Joe, James Storm, and Abyss)	Team Roode (Bobby Roode, Robbie E, Jessie Godderz, and Magnus)	One Night Only: Hardcore Justice 3	December 29, 2013 (Aired January 10, 2014)	Lowell, MA, U.S.	
13 (Note: Bully Ray was the special guest referee.)	Team MVP (MVP, The Wolves (Davey Richards and Eddie Edwards), and Willow)	Team Dixie (Bobby Roode, BroMans (Jessie Godderz and Robbie E), and Austin Aries)	Lockdown	March 9, 2014	Miami, FL, U.S.	
14	Team Angle (Kurt Angle, Austin Aries, Gunner, and Lashley)	The Beat Down Clan (MVP, Kenny King, Samoa Joe, and Low Ki)	Impact Wrestling: Lockdown	January 9, 2015 (Aired February 6)	New York, NY, U.S.	
15 (Note: This was also a Winner Takes All match.)	Team TNA (Bram, Drew Galloway, Lashley, and The Wolves (Davey Richards and Eddie Edwards))	Team GFW (Brian Myers, Chris Mordetzky, Eric Young, Jeff Jarrett, and Sonjay Dutt)	Impact Wrestling: #WinnerTakeAll	July 29, 2015 (Aired September 16)	Orlando, FL, U.S.	
16	The Dollhouse (Jade, Marti Bell, and Rebel)	Gail Kim, Maria, and Velvet Sky	Impact Wrestling: Lockdown	January 30, 2016 (Aired February 23)	London, England	
17	Team Lashley (Bobby Lashley, Mike Bennett, Drew Galloway, and Maria Kanellis)	Team EC3 (Ethan Carter III, Moose, Aron Rex, and Gail Kim)	Impact Wrestling: The Road to Glory	August 17, 2016 (Aired September 29)	Orlando, FL, U.S.	
18	The System (Eddie Edwards, Brian Myers, Bear Bronson, and Alisha Edwards)	Ricky Sosa, Fabian Aichner, KC Navarro, and Jada Stone	Lockdown	August 23, 2026	Chicago, IL, U.S.	
