= Madison Rayne =

American professional wrestler (born 1986)

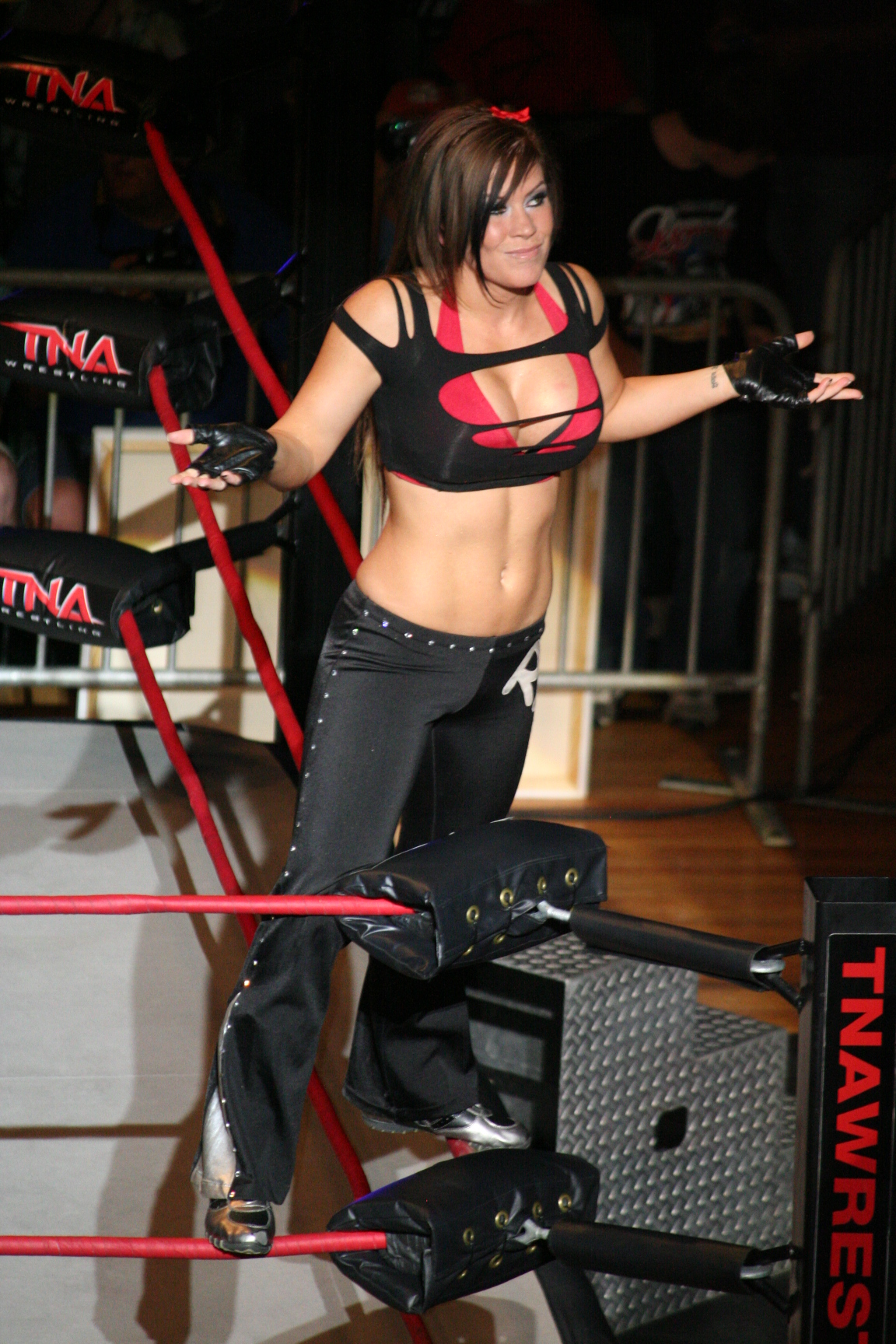
- Rayne in 2010

Personal information
- Born: Ashley Nichole Simmons; February 5, 1986 (age 40) Columbus, Ohio, U.S.
- Spouses: Jesse Cabot (m. 2011; div. 2015) Josh Mathews (m. 2015)
- Children: 1

Professional wrestling career
- Ring name(s): Amber Lively; Ashley Lane; Ashley Rayne; Lexi Lane; Madison Rayne
- Billed height: 5 ft 3 in (1.60 m)
- Billed weight: 120 lb (54 kg)
- Billed from: Seattle, Washington; Columbus, Ohio
- Trained by: Jeff Cannon
- Debut: 2005
- Retired: January 1, 2026

Ashley Nichole Lomberger (née Simmons; born February 5, 1986), better known by her ring name Madison Rayne, is an American retired professional wrestler. She is signed to All Elite Wrestling (AEW), where she is also a coach for the women's division. She is best known for her tenure with Total Nonstop Action/Impact Wrestling in its Knockouts women's division, where she was a five-time Knockouts World Champion and three-time Knockouts World Tag Team Champion.

Rayne began her wrestling career on the independent circuit, wrestling under the names Ashley Lane and Lexi Lane. She joined the all-female promotion Shimmer Women Athletes in 2007, where she was one half of the first-ever Shimmer Tag Team Champions, along with Nevaeh. In 2009, she signed with TNA, aligning herself with Angelina Love and Velvet Sky as part of the villainous stable The Beautiful People. In March 2010, alongside Lacey Von Erich and Velvet Sky, she won the TNA Knockouts Tag Team Championship; all three women defended the title simultaneously under the Freebird Rule. In April 2010, she won her first of five TNA Knockouts Championships. In addition, she was the first wrestler to hold both titles concurrently. She has also competed in Ring of Honor and took part in WWE's 2018 Mae Young Classic.

== Early life ==
Ashley Nichole Simmons was born in Columbus, Ohio, on February 5, 1986. She grew up in West Lafayette, Ohio, with her two older brothers. During high school, she was the homecoming queen and a varsity cheerleader. She also ran track and was a member of the drama club. After graduating high school, she studied radiology part-time at college while starting her wrestling career on the independent circuit. She later saw a poster for a local promotion, contacted the promoter, and began training soon after. She left college to pursue a full-time wrestling career, having had a 4.0 GPA at the time of leaving. After completing her training under Jeff Cannon, she began her wrestling career in her home state of Ohio. Her first match took place in her former high school and was refereed by former WWE wrestler Ivory.

== Professional wrestling career ==
=== Ohio Championship Wrestling (2005–2009) ===
Under the ring name Lexi Lane, she made her debut for Ohio Championship Wrestling (OCW) on March 13, 2005, event in Coshocton, Ohio, where she teamed up with trainer Jeff Cannon in a losing effort to Cruz Sangria and Jayme Braxton in a mixed tag team match. The following month, Lane made her singles match debut and defeated Jayme Braxton with Ivory as the special guest referee. At the June 18, 2005, event, Lane defeated Brian Biggs in an intergender match. The following month, Lane competed against Jayme Braxton, losing to her twice. At the OCW event on August 13, Lane teamed up with Scotty Sabre in a winning effort against Jayme Braxton and Matt Masonalso in a mixed tag team match. On November 12, Lane defeated Hailey Hatred in a singles match. On February 11, Lane competed against Shantelle Taylor in a winning effort. On the March 11, Lane unsuccessfully challenged Shark Boy for the OCW Cruiserweight Championship in a five-person match, which was won by Vic Montana. On May 12 and 13, Lane competed against Heather Owens in a losing effort.

Lane entered a feud with Jessicka Havok on June 10, after Lane defeated Havok by disqualification. On October 7 and 8, Lane defeated Havok in singles matches. On November 11, Lane teamed up with Traci Brooks in a winning effort against Havok and ODB in a tag team match. At the OCW Stairway to Stardom event on January 13, 2007, Lane competed against Havok in a singles match which ended in a no-contest.

At the March 13 OCW Ladies Night event, Lane defeated ODB in finals of the tournament to become the promotion's first ever OCW Women's Champion. On April 27, Lane made her first title defense against Sassy Stephie. The following month, Lane once again defeated Stephie in another title match. At the OCW Fan Appreciation Night, Lane successfully defended her title against Angel Dust. On August 25, Lane successfully retained her title against Stephie and Dust in a triple threat match. The following month, Lane teamed up with Nevaeh in a losing effort to Stephie and Dust in a tag team match. On November 24, Lane lost the Women's Championship to Nevaeh. Lane regained it in May 2008, but lost it to Sara Del Rey in February 2009.

=== Shimmer Women Athletes (2007–2009; 2011; 2017–2018) ===
On October 13, 2007, she made her debut in Shimmer Women Athletes as Ashley Lane. At Volume 15, Lane teamed with Lorelei Lee in a losing effort to Portia Perez and Nicole Matthews. At Volume 16, Lane lost to Alexa Thatcher.

Lane then formed a tag team with Nevaeh, and they made their debut in loss to The Experience (Lexie Fyfe and Malia Hosaka) at Volume 17, but then scored a win against The Minnesota Homewrecking Crew (Lacey and Rain) at Volume 18. At Volume 19, Lane competed in a battle royal, which was won by Jetta. Later that night, Lane teamed up with Nevaeh where they defeated the duo of Veronika Vice and Cat Power, but lost to The International Home Wrecking Crew (Rain and Jetta) at Volume 20. On October 19, Lane and Nevaeh emerged victorious from a six-team tag team gauntlet match to crown the first Shimmer Tag Team Champions. Later that evening, they successfully defended the titles against the Canadian NINJAs (Portia Perez and Nicole Matthews). At Volume 23, Lane and Neveah successfully defended their titles against The International Home Wrecking Crew (Rain and Jetta) in a two out of three falls match. At Volume 25, Lane and Neveah successfully defended their championships against Amazing Kong and Sara Del Rey. At Volume 26 on May 3, 2009, Lane and Nevaeh lost the Shimmer Tag Team Championship to the Canadian NINJAs.

At Volume 27, Lane and Nevaeh lost to the team of Melanie Cruise and Wesna Busic in a tag team match. At Volume 28, Lane and Naveah defeated Kacey Diamond and Sassy Stephie. Because of agreement with Shimmer and Ring of Honor (ROH), Lane made her debut for ROH on April 19, 2008, where she competed in a Four Corner Survival match against Daizee Haze, Lacey, and MsChif, which was won by MsChif. Lane later left ROH after debuting in Total Nonstop Action Wrestling (TNA) in January 2009.

On October 1, 2011, Lane returned to Shimmer as fan favorite, calling out former partner Nevaeh for turning on MsChif and Jessie McKay during a tag team match. Nevaeh in turn claimed that Lane had turned her back on Shimmer by leaving the promotion in 2009, which led to a brawl between the two. Later that night, Nevaeh defeated Lane in her return match. At Volume 44, Lane teamed with Mia Yim in a losing effort against Nevaeh and Sassy Stephie.

On July 8, 2017, she made her returns in Shimmer Women Athletes as Ashley Lane at Volume 92, defeating Taeler Hendrix and at Volume 93 was defeated by Veda Scott. The following day, she defeated Veda Scott at Volume 94. On November 11, Hottest Free Agents (Ashley Lane and Deonna Purrazzo) defeated Blue Nation (Charli Evans and Jessica Troy) at Volume 97 and the following day, at Volume 98, she and Deonna Purrazzo were defeated by Totally Tubular Tag Team (Delilah Doom and Leva Bates) in a tag team match for the Shimmer Tag Team Championship.

On October 20, at Shimmer Volume 105, she was defeated by Dust in a Heart of Shimmer Championship Match.

=== Wrestlicious (2009–2010) ===
In 2009, Lane took part in the first season of Wrestlicious, which began airing on television in March 2010. In the promotion, she played in the role of "Cheerleader" Amber Lively. She debuted in the third episode of Takedown (aired on March 17), teaming with Lacey Von Erich and winning by disqualification against the team of Draculetta and White Magic. On the April 7 episode of Takedown, Lively participated in a Hoedown Throwdown battle royal to determine the top two contenders for the Wrestlicious Championship, but failed to advance.

=== Other promotions (2010–2012) ===
As Madison Rayne, she made her debut for Remix Pro Wrestling (RPW) on April 24, 2010, at the Remix Pro Throw Down For The Pound 2 event in Marietta, Ohio, where she defeated Nevaeh and Sojournor Bolt in a triple threat match. Rayne made her debut for Purks International Championship Wrestling (PICW) on August 10 event in Cedartown, Georgia, where she defeated Tracy Taylor. On April 2, 2011, at the Remix Pro Throw Down-Hoedown For The Pound 3 event, she defeated Sara Del Rey in a singles match.

Rayne made her debut for Family Wrestling Entertainment (FWE) at the FWE Fallout pay-per-view, where she was defeated by Tara with Christy Hemme as the special guest referee. On September 22, 2012, Rayne made her debut for Northeast Wrestling, teaming up with Rosita to defeat The Beautiful People (Angelina Love and Velvet Sky) in a tag team match. Rayne made her debut for National Wrestling Superstars (NWS) on December 12, 2012, at the NWS Jingle Brawl, where she, along with Danny Demanto, accompanied Nikki Addams where Addams competed against Nikki Richardson. Later that night, Rayne teamed up with Demanto in a losing effort to Chris D'Andrea and Rosita in a mixed tag team match. The following night, Rayne teamed up with Demanto in a winning effort defeating D'Andrea and Rosita in a rematch.

=== Total Nonstop Action Wrestling (2009–2013) ===
==== The Beautiful People (2009–2010) ====
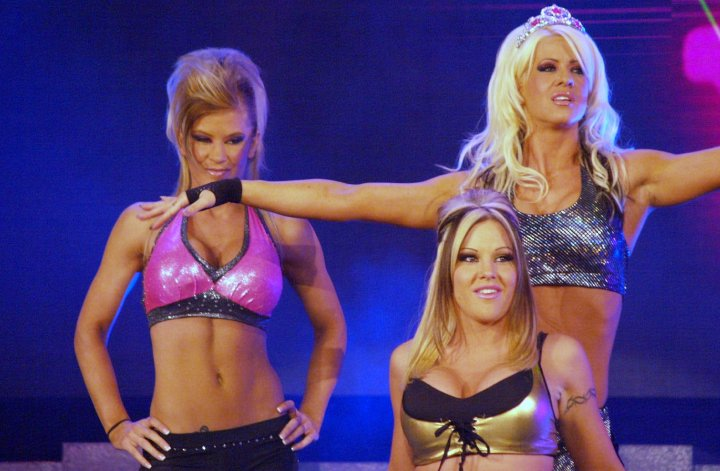
Rayne (left) as a part of The Beautiful People in March 2009

Lane debuted in Total Nonstop Action Wrestling (TNA) as Madison Rayne on the January 8, 2009, episode of TNA Impact!, where she was defeated by Awesome Kong. She returned on the February 12 episode of Impact! in a Knockouts gauntlet match, and was one of the finalists, but was eliminated by Sojo Bolt. The following week, she began her first storyline by slapping and walking out on her tag team partner Taylor Wilde in a match against The Beautiful People (Angelina Love and Velvet Sky), and her character became villainous in the process. On the March 5 episode of Impact!, Rayne aligned herself with The Beautiful People after assisting them in winning a four-way tag team match. At Destination X in March, Rayne made her pay-per-view debut, teaming with Love and Sky against The Governor, Taylor Wilde and Roxxi in a losing effort.

Rayne's hazing continued after The Beautiful People won an Impact! tag team match against Awesome Kong and Raisha Saeed, after which Rayne tried to cut the braided hair of the TNA Knockouts Champion Kong. With Sky in her corner, Angelina Love faced Kong and perennial nemesis Taylor Wilde in a three-way cage match for the Knockout Championship at Lockdown, which Love would win. The following week on Impact!, Mi Pi Sexy had a celebration with male dancers and named Rayne an official member of the Beautiful People. However, the celebration was cut short by Kong. Kong continued her attack on Mi Pi Sexy and proved her dominance by making her way through Rayne, Sky and Cute Kip, who Love brought back to stop her, in stretcher matches on the following weeks of Impact!.

At Hard Justice in August, Rayne cost Love her Knockouts Championship when her interference in the match backfired. On the following episode of Impact!, Rayne was scheduled to face Love in a match, but before it started, Love attacked her from behind. After Love had pinned Rayne, Sky showed up holding a brown paper bag and put it on Rayne's head to humiliate her. Rayne was then saved by Tara and Christy Hemme. On the September 10 episode of Impact!, Rayne and partner Roxxi lost to The Beautiful People in a match that was part of a tournament to crown the inaugural Knockouts Tag Team Champions.

The following week, Rayne, after helping Love and Sky advance to the finals of the tournament, was welcomed back into The Beautiful People. At No Surrender, Rayne replaced Love, who had been released from her contract due to work visa issues prior to the event, and teamed up with Sky in the tournament finals, where they were defeated by the team of Sarita and Taylor Wilde.

On the October 1 episode of Impact!, The Beautiful People apologized to the TNA fans and wrestlers for their behavior, blaming their past actions on Love. They invited the Knockouts Tag Team Champions, Taylor Wilde and Sarita, down to the ring to prove their apology was genuine and expressed their desire for a competitive match at Bound for Glory. The Beautiful People shook their hands, but then attacked them. As they began to lose the advantage in the assault, the debuting Lacey Von Erich took out Wilde and Sarita. The three then posed in the ring, welcoming Von Erich into The Beautiful People. Rayne gained her first victory in TNA on the October 8 episode of Impact! by scoring the deciding fall in an eight-wrestler elimination match where she, Sky, Alissa Flash and Traci Brooks defeated Sarita, Taylor Wilde, Hamada and Christy Hemme after the interference from Von Erich.

The three then won their first match as a team, defeating ODB, Tara and Awesome Kong, but was unsuccessful in their Tag Team title rematch at Bound For Glory. On the October 22 episode of Impact!, The Beautiful People began appearing in backstage segments they dubbed as their reality show "The Meanest Girls", an allusion to the 2004 teen comedy Mean Girls.

In the pilot episode, The Beautiful People attacked Taylor Wilde and Sarita, and engaged in a food fight, with The Beautiful People coming out on top. In the sequel, which aired on the November 5 episode of Impact!, the Beautiful People attacked ODB, setting up a six-wrestler tag team match at Turning Point, for both the Knockouts Championship and the Knockouts Tag Team Championship. At the pay-per-view, the Beautiful People were unsuccessful, as ODB pinned Rayne to win the match for the reigning champions. Around this time, the Beautiful People began using a weapon dubbed Lacey's Ugly Stick, a pink side-handle baton.

Angelina Love returned to the company on the January 14, 2010, episode of Impact!, but instead of re-joining The Beautiful People, she attacked them. Several weeks later on March 8, Rayne and Velvet Sky defeated the teams of Love and Tara, and Sarita and Taylor Wilde in a three-way match to win the vacant Knockouts Tag Team Championship. Under the Freebird Rule, all three members of The Beautiful People were considered champions, and any combination of two members were permitted to defend the title. At Lockdown in April, Rayne and Sky partnered against Tara and Angelina Love in a tag team cage match, during which Rayne pinned Tara to win Love's Knockouts Championship. With the win, she became the first person to hold both the Knockout Championship and the Knockouts Tag Team Championship simultaneously. The following month at Sacrifice, Rayne defeated Tara in a Title vs. Career match, causing Tara to retire from TNA and ending the storyline rivalry between Tara and The Beautiful People. At Slammiversary VIII Rayne retained her title against Roxxi in another Title vs. Career match.

==== Championship reigns (2010–2011) ====
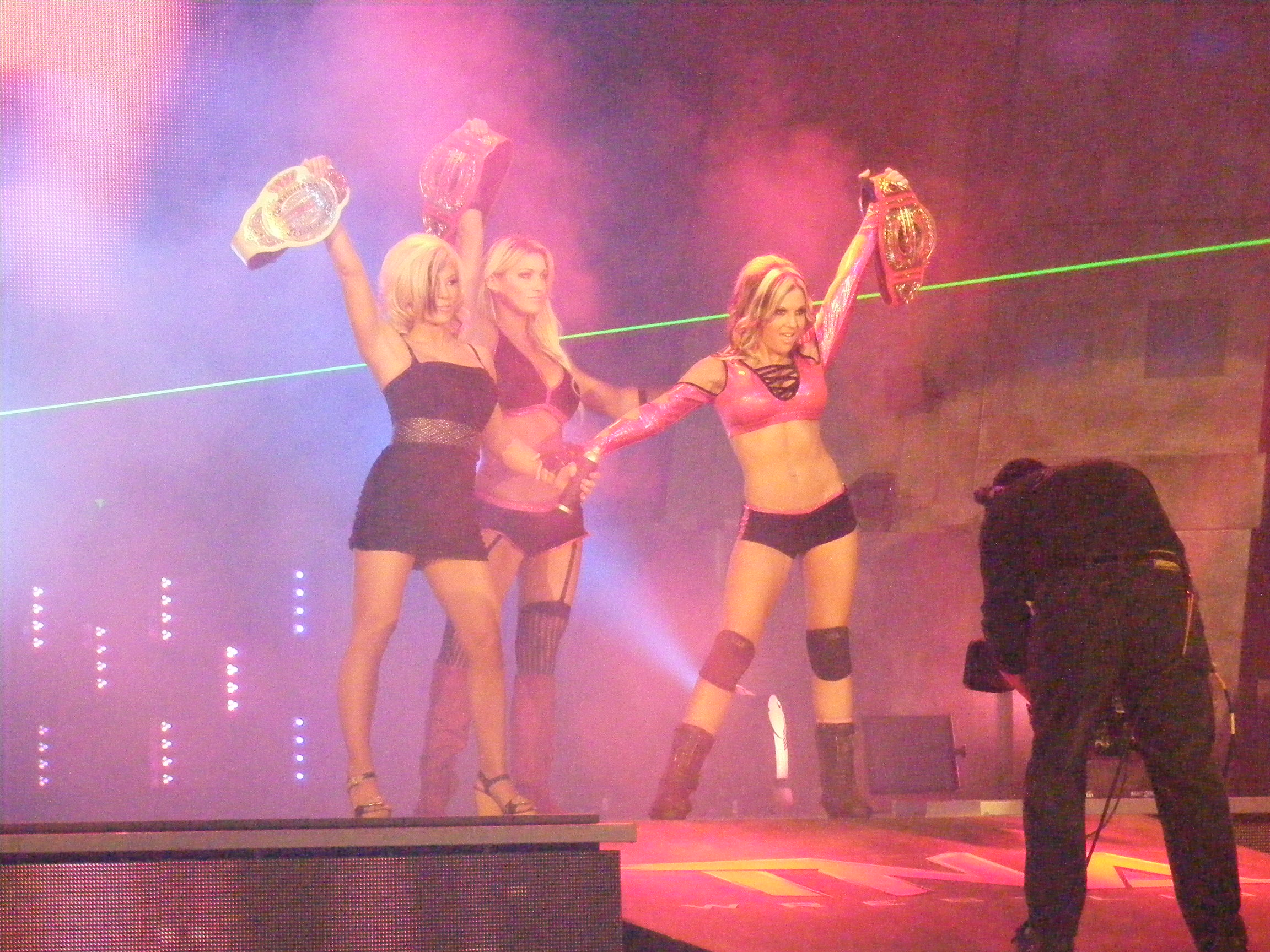
At their peak in spring 2010, The Beautiful People held all of TNA's women's championship, with Rayne (left) in particular being a double champion - holding both the Knockouts Title (white belt in her hand) and a share of the Knockouts Tag Team Titles under the Freebird Rule

On July 11 at the Victory Road pay-per-view, Madison Rayne defended her Knockouts Championship against Angelina Love in another Title vs. Career match with the added stipulation that Madison would lose the title by disqualification if either Velvet Sky or Lacey Von Erich interfered; the match ended when a villainess masked with a motorcycle helmet attacked Angelina and Madison was disqualified, losing the title due to the stipulation. However, the title was returned to her on the July 22 episode of Impact! as there was no proof that the masked woman was either Sky or Von Erich.

After weeks of arguing amongst each other over Rayne's attitude, the Beautiful People agreed to a truce on the July 29 episode of Impact!. However, on the following episode of Impact!, Rayne and the mystery woman inadvertently cost Sky and Von Erich the Knockouts Tag Team Championship in a match against Hamada and Taylor Wilde, when their interference backfired. The following week, Rayne lost the Knockouts Championship to Angelina Love, after a distraction caused by Velvet Sky attacking the mystery woman. Rayne received her rematch for the title on the following week's episode of Impact!, but was again defeated by Love, after an interference from Velvet Sky. After the match Rayne and the mystery woman beat down Love and Sky. Rayne's mysterious ally was finally unmasked and revealed as Tara on the September 2 episode of Impact!, when the two of them defeated the Beautiful People in a tag team match. At the No Surrender pay-per-view, Rayne was defeated by Velvet Sky in a singles match. On the September 16 episode of Impact!, Rayne and Tara turned on Lacey Von Erich, after she and Rayne failed to regain the Knockouts Tag Team Championship from Hamada and Taylor Wilde. Von Erich was then saved by Love and Sky, who took her back into the Beautiful People. On the September 30 episode of Impact!, Rayne signed a waiver to allow Tara to return to the ring, after losing a Title vs. Career match, which was supposed to end her TNA career.

Rayne attempted to regain the Knockout Championship in a four corners match with Love, Sky and Tara on October 10 at the Bound for Glory pay-per-view, but was unsuccessful, when Tara pinned Sky to win the title. After the match, the outraged Rayne went after special guest referee Mickie James, but ended up being laid out by her. On the October 14 episode of Impact!, Tara laid down for Rayne and let her pin her to win the championship back, making her a three-time Knockout Champion. On the December 16 episode of Impact!, Rayne and Tara defeated Mickie James and Miss Tessmacher to advance to the finals of a tournament for the vacated Knockouts Tag Team Championship. The following week, they were defeated in the finals by the team of Angelina Love and Winter. In 2011, Rayne would start a rivalry with Mickie James over the Knockouts Championship, and would successfully defend the title against her at Genesis, and at Against All Odds in a Last Knockout Standing match, both times after interference from Tara. Afterwards, Rayne, claiming to now be done with James, announced the beginning of an open challenge series intended to find her new opponents, and, as part of it, successfully defended the Knockout Championship against former Knockouts ODB, Roxxi and Alissa Flash. However, during the storyling, Tara began claiming that Rayne had gone too far in her brutality towards James, but was forced to follow her orders due to being under exclusive contract with Rayne and not with TNA. After Rayne lost her title to James at Lockdown, ending her reign at 188 days, James agreed to give her a rematch for it on the condition that if she is unable to regain the title, Tara would be released from her contract with Rayne. On May 15 at Sacrifice, Tara turned on Rayne during her match with James, costing her the Knockout Championship and guaranteeing herself a release from her contract with Rayne. Rayne attacked Tara on the June 9 episode of Impact Wrestling, costing her and Mickie James their tag team match against Angelina Love and Winter. The two faced each other in a singles match on the July 14 episode of Impact Wrestling, where Tara was victorious after distracting Rayne with her pet tarantula Poison. Rayne returned on the September 29 episode of Impact Wrestling, defeating Tara to earn a shot at the Knockouts Championship at Bound for Glory.

==== Alliance with Gail Kim and hiatus (2011–2013) ====
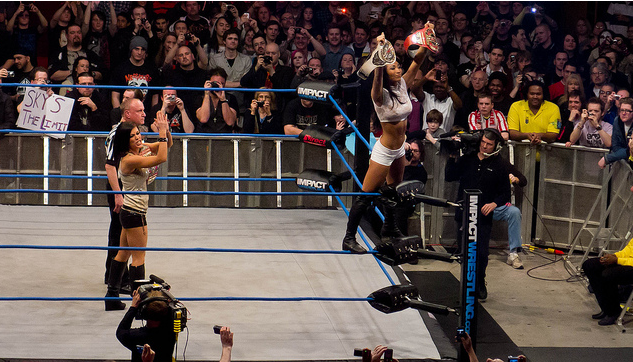
Rayne (left) and Gail Kim in 2012

On October 16 at the Bound for Glory pay-per-view, Rayne was defeated by Velvet Sky in the four-way title match, which also included Mickie James and Winter. On the following episode of Impact Wrestling, Rayne aligned herself with the returning Gail Kim and the Vice President of the Knockouts Division, Karen Jarrett.

On the November 3 episode of Impact Wrestling, Rayne and Kim defeated TnT (Brooke Tessmacher and Tara) to win the Knockouts Tag Team Championship. The following week, they made their first title defense, defeating Mickie James and Velvet Sky. On December 11 at the Final Resolution pay-per-view, Rayne caused a distraction during a Knockouts Championship match between Gail Kim and Mickie James, costing James the title. After Karen Jarrett was, in storyline, fired from TNA on the December 15 episode of Impact Wrestling, Rayne took over her role as the Vice President of the Knockouts Division, until Sting revoked her power on December 29 episode of Impact Wrestling. Later that same night, Rayne interfered in the main event between Gail Kim and Mickie James, once again costing James the Knockouts Championship. On the January 5 episode of Impact Wrestling, Rayne and Kim retained their titles against James and Traci Brooks. On the January 19 episode of Impact Wrestling, Rayne was defeated by James in a steel cage match. After walking out on Gail Kim at the Against All Odds pay-per-view, Rayne became the number one contender to her Knockouts Championship by winning a battle royal on the February 16 episode of Impact Wrestling. In the following weeks, tension between Rayne and Kim began show, with the two negatively interfering in each other's matches. On the March 8 episode of Impact Wrestling, Kim and Rayne lost the Knockouts Tag Team Championship to Eric Young and ODB. On March 18 at the Victory Road pay-per-view, Rayne failed to capture the Knockouts Championship from Kim. On the March 29 episode of Impact Wrestling, Kim and Rayne reconciled and remained together as a team.

The July 5 episode of Impact Wrestling saw the culmination of a several month long storyline, when Rayne revealed referee Earl Hebner as her secret crush. On the August 2 episode of Impact Wrestling, Hebner helped Rayne win a four-way match over Gail Kim, Mickie James and Tara to become the number one contender to the Knockouts Championship. On August 12 at the Hardcore Justice pay-per-view, Hebner helped Rayne defeat Miss Tessmacher to win the Knockouts Championship for the fourth time. Rayne lost the title back to Tessmacher on the following episode of Impact Wrestling in a match refereed by the debuting Taryn Terrell.

Rayne returned to TNA on the November 15 episode of Impact Wrestling, where competed in a battle royal to become the number one contender to the Knockouts Championship, but failed to win after being eliminated by ODB. Rayne faced off against the returning Velvet Sky on the December 13 episode of Impact Wrestling, where she was defeated by Sky. On March 17, 2013, Rayne made an appearance at TNA's Knockouts Knockdown pay-per-view to congratulate and crown her former tag team partner Gail Kim, who was named "Queen of the Knockouts". Rayne would later stop appearing on television due to being on a legitimate maternity leave. On July 3, Rayne announced on her Twitter account that her contract with TNA had expired.

=== Return to TNA (2013–2017) ===
==== Championship pursuits (2013–2014) ====
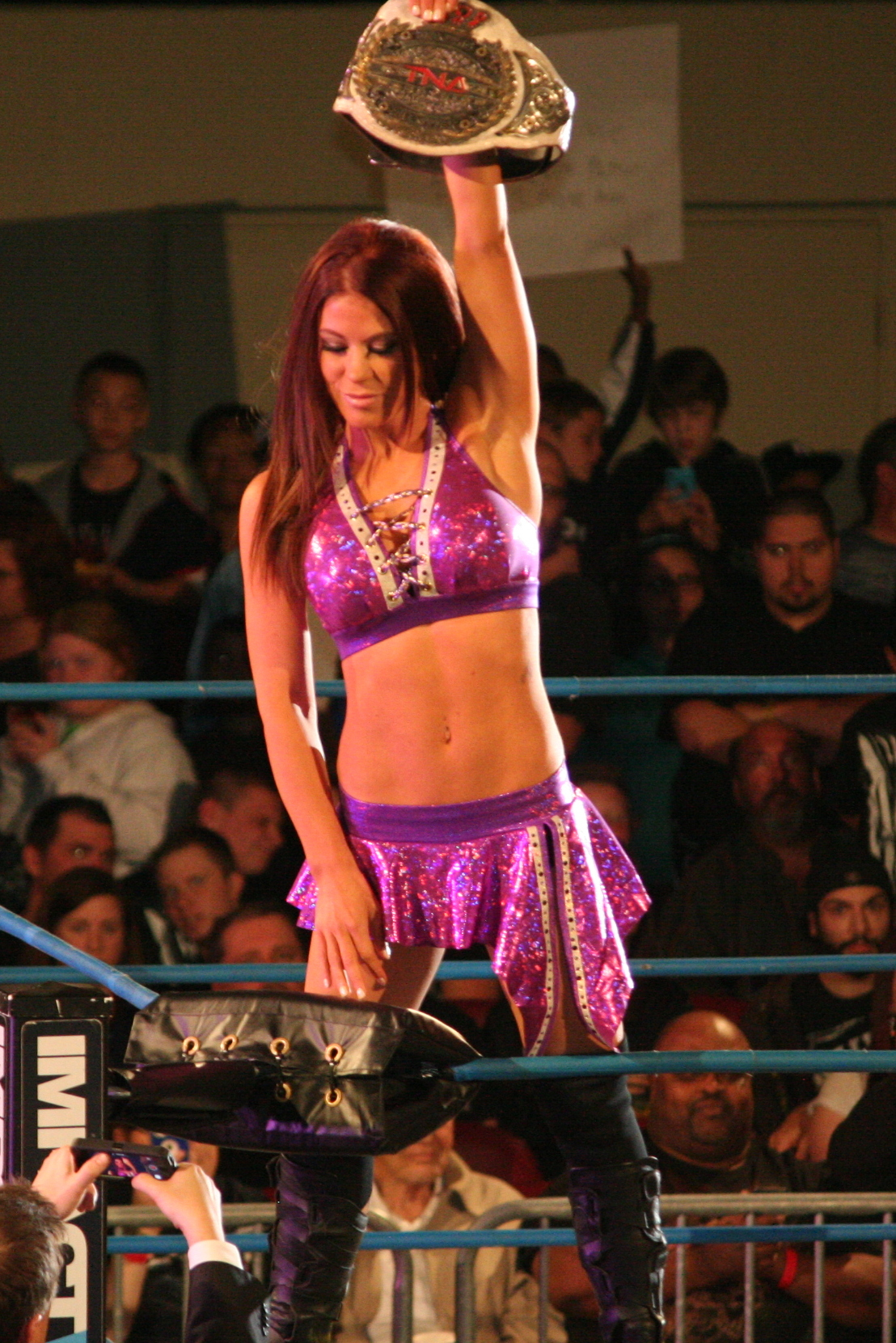
Rayne as TNA Knockouts Champion in 2014

Rayne returned to TNA on the December 12 episode of Impact Wrestling, saving ODB, who was being attacked by Lei'D Tapa and Rayne's former partner, the Knockouts Champion Gail Kim, establishing herself as a face in the process. Rayne made her in-ring return on the December 19 episode of Impact Wrestling, when she teamed with ODB to defeat Lei'D Tapa and Gail Kim, after Rayne pinned Kim. On the January 2, 2014, episode of Impact Wrestling, Rayne defeated Kim in an open challenge match, thus earning a match for the Knockouts Championship. On January 16 at the Impact Wrestling: Genesis special episode, Rayne defeated Kim to win the Knockouts Championship for a record-tying fifth time. On the January 30 episode of Impact Wrestling, Rayne and her former The Beautiful People partner Velvet Sky teamed up in a tag team match, which they won against Kim and Tapa. The rivalry between Kim and Rayne continued as the two competed in a street fight on the February 20 episode of Impact Wrestling, which Kim would win after a distraction by Lei'D Tapa. The following week on the February 27 episode of Impact Wrestling, Rayne once again reunited with Sky in a tag team match against Tapa and Alpha Female, which they would lose when Tapa pinned Rayne. On March 2, both Rayne and Gail Kim were part of a group of TNA wrestlers that took part in Wrestle-1's Kaisen: Outbreak event in Tokyo, Japan. During the event, Kim defeated Rayne in a non-title match. A week later at the Lockdown pay-per-view, Rayne defeated Kim in a steel cage match to retain the Knockouts Championship.

After ending her rivalry with Kim, Rayne entered a storyline with Angelina Love, who returned on the March 13 episode of Impact Wrestling, with the intent to reunite The Beautiful People. On the March 20 episode of Impact Wrestling, Velvet Sky would accept Love's offer, while Rayne would decline and was attacked by Love as a result. On the March 27 episode of Impact Wrestling, Rayne was defeated by Love due to interference from Sky. On the April 3 episode of Impact Wrestling, Rayne teamed with Brittany against The Beautiful People, and came out on the losing side when Love pinned Brittany. On April 27 at the Sacrifice pay-per-view, Rayne lost the Knockout Championship to Love, ending her reign at 101 days. After this, Rayne would enter a storyline in which Brittany would attempt to get involved in Rayne's feud with The Beautiful People, only to be repeatedly rejected. On the May 29 episode of Impact Wrestling, after Rayne refused to be Brittany's tag team partner, Brittany would confront Rayne and confess her attraction towards her, only to be rejected. On the June 5 episode of Impact Wrestling, Rayne received her rematch clause against Love in a losing effort, after a distraction by Sky. On the June 12 episode of Impact Wrestling, Rayne was defeated by Gail Kim in a number one contender's match, which also involved Brittany. On the July 3 episode of Impact Wrestling, during an in-ring segment, Rayne was attacked by Brittany after she promised to remain friends with Rayne. The feud between Brittany and Rayne culminated in a no count-out, no disqualification match on the July 17 episode of Impact Wrestling, which Rayne won.

Rayne competed in a #1 Contender's match against Taryn Terrell on the August 27 episode of Impact Wrestling, but was unsuccessful, despite showing signs of a villainous turn. On the October 8 episode of Impact Wrestling, Rayne became the number one contender to Havok's Knockouts Championship, after defeating Angelina Love and Taryn Terrell in a three-way match. After the match, Rayne continued displaying her heel persona when she left Terrell to be attacked by Havok. Rayne received her title opportunity on the following week's episode of Impact Wrestling but was unsuccessful in winning the championship from Havok. On the October 29 episode of Impact Wrestling, Rayne turned heel by attacking Taryn Terrell during their tag team match against The Beautiful People, allowing Love and Sky to win.

==== Various storylines (2015–2017) ====
On the January 30, 2015, episode of Impact Wrestling, the villainous Rayne unsuccessfully challenged Taryn Terrell for the Knockouts Championship in a three-way match, also involving Gail Kim. On the TKO: Night of Knockouts edition of Impact Wrestling on April 24, Rayne competed in a four-way number one contender's match against Angelina Love, Brooke and Gail Kim, which was ultimately won by Brooke. On the September 2 episode of Impact Wrestling, Rayne and Angelina Love came to the aid of Velvet Sky, who was being beaten down by Dollhouse members Rebel, Jade and Marti Bell, turning face and reforming The Beautiful People in the process. During October and November (taped in July), she participated in the TNA World Title Series, where she ended third of her block, tied with Brooke, failing to advance to the finals.

Rayne started competing individually after winning a match against Velvet Sky for a title shot against Gail Kim. She participated in a three-way match against Gail Kim and Jade for the TNA Knockouts Championship, which was won by Jade. On the August 25 episode of Impact Wrestling, Rayne competed in five-way match against the champion Sienna, Marti Bell, Jade and Allie for the TNA Knockouts Championship, which was won by the latter. On September 8, 2016, Rayne was announced as a new member of TNA's creative team, replacing Christy Hemme, who left TNA earlier in April 2016. Since then she has been acting as a female color commentator during the Knockouts matches. On April 6, 2017, during the episode of Impact Wrestling, Rayne slowly became a villainess once again and participated in a gauntlet match to become number one contender for Rosemary's Knockouts Championship, which was won by ODB. She left the promotion in July 2017. On October 13, 2017, it was announced that Rayne would be attending tryouts at the WWE Performance Center.

=== Ring of Honor (2017–2019) ===
On November 8, 2017, Ring of Honor announced that Lomberger was signed to compete for ROH for the first time in nine years. She debuted at the Survival of the Fittest event in Oklahoma City in singles competition against Deonna Purrazzo.

On January 10, 2018, Rayne was announced to compete in the Women of Honor Championship tournament. Rayne was defeated by Mandy Leon in a first-round match that was uploaded on February 21, 2018. On July 21, 2018, in the ROH TV Tapings, she was defeated by Sumie Sakai in a Women of Honor World Championship Match, that was uploaded on August 31. On September 19, Rayne announced that she signed one-year deal with ROH. On December 14, at Final Battle (2018) Rayne participated in a Four Corner Survival match for the Women of Honor World Championship, where she was unsuccessful to capture the title after being eliminated by Kelly Klein. Rayne and ROH came to terms on her release from her contract on February 28, 2019, reportedly due to creative differences.

=== WWE (2018) ===
On July 30, 2018, WWE announced that Simmons would compete as Ashley Rayne in the 2018 Mae Young Classic tournament. She was eliminated in the first round after losing to Mercedes Martinez.

=== Second return to Impact Wrestling (2018–2022) ===
On the November 29 episode of Impact!, Rayne returned as a heel in a three-way match between herself, Laurel Van Ness and K. C. Spinelli in a losing effort. Rayne once again returned on the May 17 episode of Impact! on commentary during a knockouts match between Tessa Blanchard and Kiera Hogan. After the match, Madison Rayne came down to the ring to save Hogan from the assault by Tessa Blanchard. On the May 31 episode of Impact!, she defeated Blanchard. At Slammiversary XVI, she unsuccessfully challenged Su Yung for the Impact Knockouts Championship. On August 24, 2018, Rayne's profile on Impact's website was moved to the alumni section.

On March 1, 2019, one day after her release from ROH, Rayne signed a multi-year contract to return to Impact Wrestling. In her first match on Impact! since her return, Rayne unsuccessfully challenged Jordynne Grace to become the #1 contender for the Impact Knockouts Championship. On the July 17 episode of Impact!, after Rayne lost to Grace in a triple threat match that also involved Hogan, Rayne joined forces with Hogan by attacking Grace, turning heel in the process.

During 2020, Rayne transitioned into a more active role in commentary along with her husband Josh Mathews, being the first female figure on the commentary on a weekly basis. On the Countdown to Hard to Kill pre-show for Hard to Kill (2021), Rayne announced her retirement from the wrestling business. She made her final appearance on Hard to Kill proper, presenting the Knockouts Tag Team Championship belts to Kiera Hogan and Tasha Steelz alongside former championship partner Gail Kim.

On the August 12, 2021, episode of Impact!, Rayne returned to Impact Wrestling, attacking Taylor Wilde during her match against Tenille Dashwood, and aligning with Dashwood after the match. In October, Rayne entered a tournament to determine the inaugural Impact Digital Media Champion, where she lost to Chelsea Green in the first round; however, Rayne replaced Dashwood to compete against Jordynne Grace in the final at Bound for Glory, where she lost. Rayne wrestled her final match on the August 11, 2022 episode of Impact against Mia Yim, in a losing effort, ending her third tenure with the company.

=== All Elite Wrestling / Return to ROH (2022–present) ===
All Elite Wrestling announced in August 2022 that Rayne had signed as a coach for the promotion's women's division. She is also set to compete as a wrestler. Rayne made her in-ring debut for the promotion on the August 5 episode of AEW Rampage. On August 10 at AEW Quake by the Lake, Rayne was unsuccessful at winning the TBS Championship against Jade Cargill.

Rayne appeared on January 18 at The Jay Briscoe Celebration of Life, where she was defeated by ROH Women's World Champion Athena, if Rayne won, she would have received a title match. Rayne made her Ring of Honor (ROH) return on the March 2, 2023, episode of ROH on Honor Club, where she alongside Skye Blue defeated The Renegades (Charlette Renegade and Robyn Renegade). During a dark match with Robyn Renegade on the April 13 episode of Honor Club, Rayne suffered a foot injury. Rayne returned on the December 12, 2024 episode of Honor Club.

Rayne had her final match on January 1, 2026 on ROH where Rayne and Deonna Purrazzo lost to Billie Starkz and Diamanté. Following the match, Rayne announced her retirement from in-ring competition.

== Personal life ==
Simmons married Jesse Cabot on February 8, 2011. Their daughter was born on August 29, 2013. Simmons and Cabot divorced in 2015. Later that year, in August, Simmons married Impact Wrestling commentator Josh Lomberger (better known as Josh Mathews).

== Championships and accomplishments ==
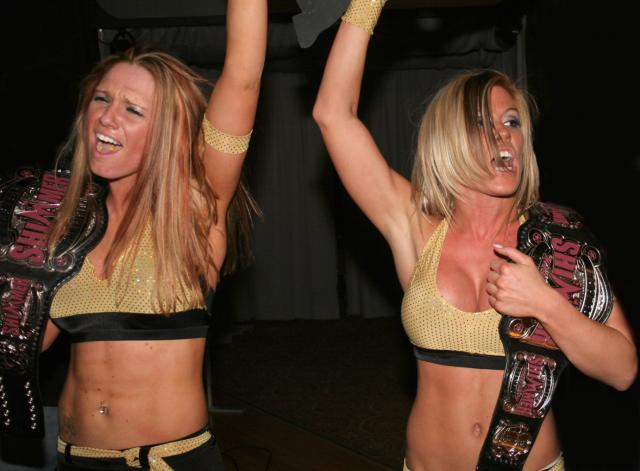
Early in her career Rayne (right as Ashley Lane) and Nevaeh were Shimmer Tag Team Champions

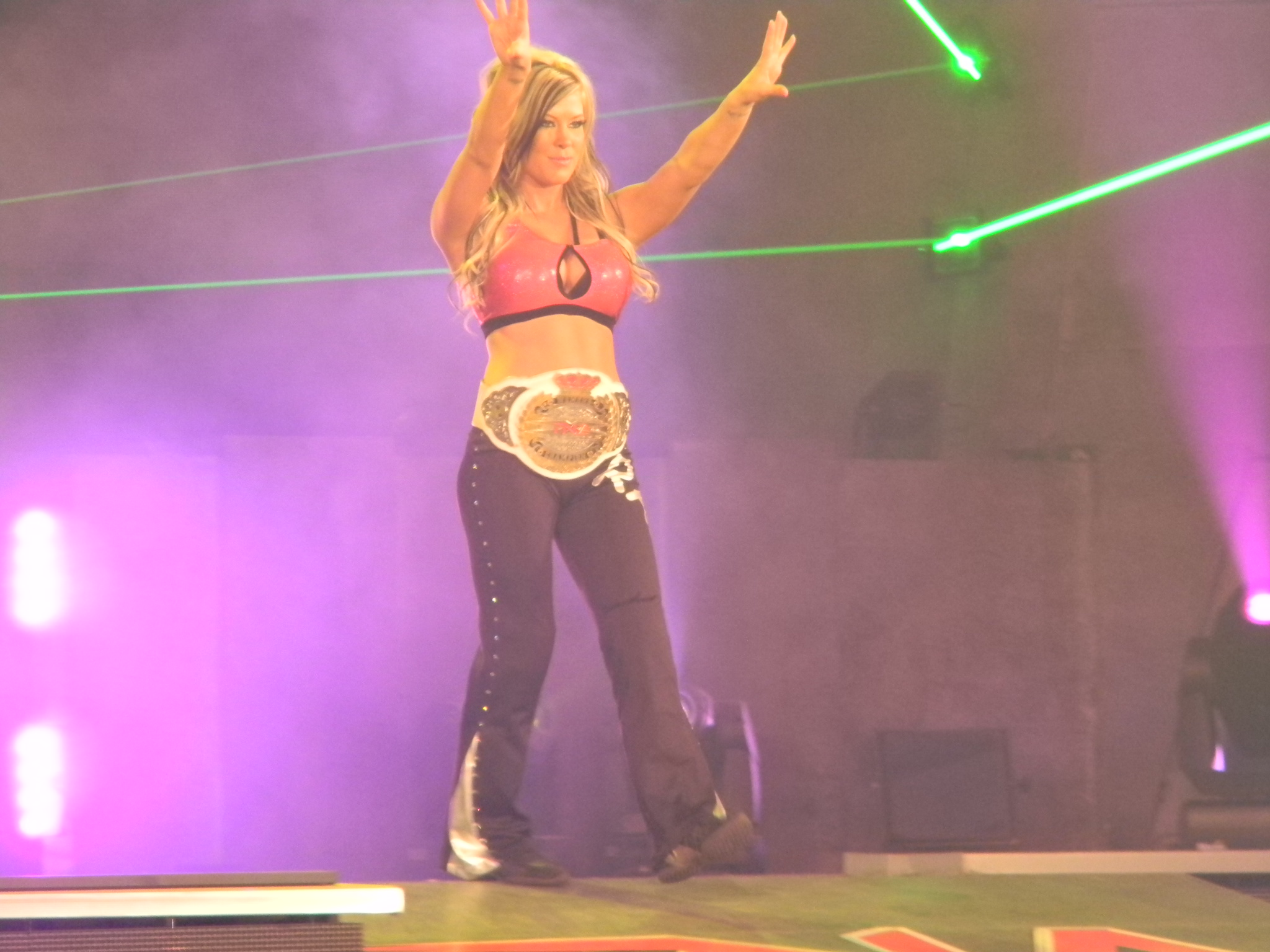
Once in TNA/Impact, Rayne became a five-time TNA Knockouts Champion...

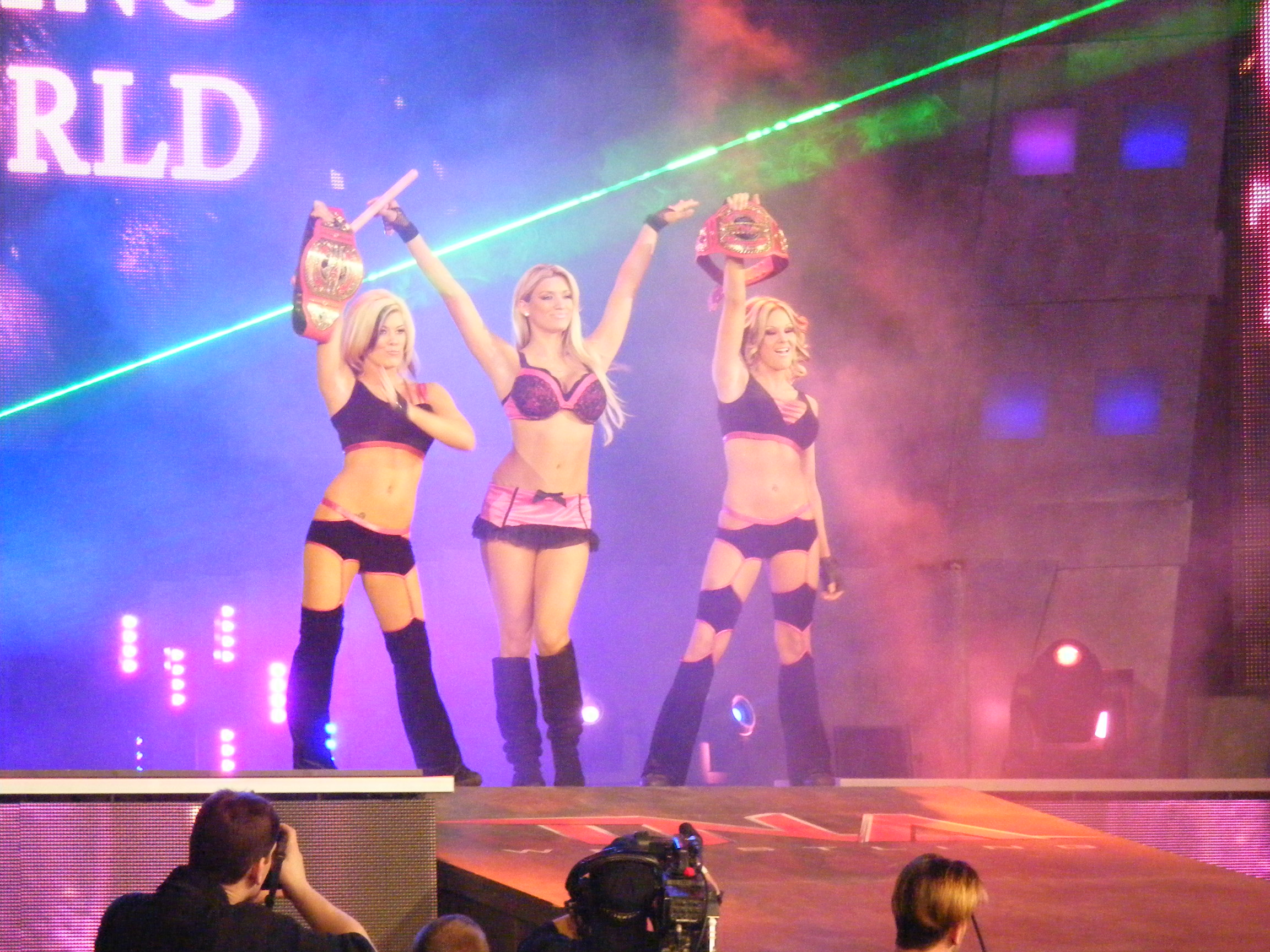
...and a three-time TNA Knockouts Tag Team Champion - shown here (on the left) during her reign as a member of The Beautiful People

- Dynamite Championship Wrestling
  - DCW Women's Championship (1 time)
- International Wrestling Cartel
  - IWC Women's Championship (1 time)
- Pro Wrestling Illustrated
  - Ranked No. 5 of the top 50 female wrestlers in the PWI Female Top 50 in 2011
- Ohio Championship Wrestling
  - OCW Women's Championship (2 times)
- Ohio Valley Wrestling
  - OVW Women's Championship (1 time)
- Shimmer Women Athletes
  - Shimmer Tag Team Championship (1 time, inaugural) – with Nevaeh
- Total Nonstop Action Wrestling / Impact Wrestling
  - TNA Knockouts Championship (5 times)
  - TNA / Impact Knockouts Tag Team Championship (3 times) – with Lacey Von Erich and Velvet Sky (1), (Note: Rayne defended the title with either Von Erich or Sky under the Freebird Rule.) Gail Kim (1), and Tenille Dashwood (1)
  - Queen of the Knockouts (2014)
- Zero 1 USA
  - Zero 1 USA Women's Championship (1 time)

=== Luchas de Apuestas ===
Winner (wager)	Loser (wager)	Location	Event	Date	Notes
Mickie James (hair)	Madison Rayne (championship)	Cincinnati, Ohio	Lockdown	April 17, 2011	
