= Bound for Glory (2011) =

2011 Total Nonstop Action Wrestling pay-per-view event

- Promotional poster featuring various TNA wrestlers
- Promotion: Total Nonstop Action Wrestling
- Date: October 16, 2011
- City: Philadelphia, Pennsylvania
- Venue: Liacouras Center
- Attendance: 3,585
- Tagline: We The People

Pay-per-view chronology
← Previous; No Surrender	Next → Turning Point

TNA Bound for Glory chronology
← Previous; 2010	Next → 2012

The 2011 Bound for Glory was a professional wrestling pay-per-view event produced by Total Nonstop Action Wrestling (TNA), that took place on October 16, 2011 at the Liacouras Center on the campus of Temple University in Philadelphia. It was the seventh annual event under the Bound for Glory chronology, and the premiere event of 2011 for TNA. On top of that, it was the first Bound for Glory in the city of Philadelphia and the second TNA PPV to be held in Philadelphia after TNA Lockdown in 2009. This was also the first TNA PPV that was simulcast live in over 100 theaters across the country.

Bound for Glory featured a supercard, a scheduling of more than one main event. Eight matches took place at the event. In the main event, Kurt Angle defeated Bobby Roode to retain the TNA World Heavyweight Championship. The other high-profile matches featured Sting defeating Hulk Hogan in a stipulated match where Dixie Carter regained control as owner of TNA as a direct result. This would be Hulk Hogan's final televised match before his death in 2025. Another featured match would be A.J. Styles defeating Christopher Daniels in an "I Quit" match.

In October 2017, with the launch of the Global Wrestling Network, the event became available to stream on demand.

== Production ==
Other on-screen personnel
Commentator	Mike Tenay
Commentator	Taz
Ring announcer	Jeremy Borash
Referee	Rudy Charles
Referee	Mark "Slick" Johnson
Referee	Andrew Thomas
Interviewers	Jeremy Borash

=== Background ===
On July 14, 2011 Sting, in an interview with ESPN SportsCenter anchor Robert Flores, declared that the event would be held in Philadelphia at the Liacouras Center on October 16, 2011. Tickets for the event went on sale on July 22, 2011.

On September 18, 2011, a new series called The Bound for Glory Chronicles debuted on TNA's website. The show featured exclusive interviews with wrestlers talking about their memories from previous Bound for Glory events. The wrestlers featured included Jeff Jarrett and Matt Morgan.

For the PPV, TNA also organized their annual Bound for Glory VIP Weekend, which included events such as Fan InterAction held at the Philadelphia Airport Marriott on the eve of Bound for Glory. This was a series of fan interaction sessions, which allowed fans to get close and personal with their favorite stars for opportunities such as pictures, autographs and special interviews. Other events included the "Night Before the Glory" Dinner Party, which featured more interaction between the fans and wrestlers.

=== Storylines ===
Bound for Glory featured eight professional wrestling matches and one pre-show match that involved different wrestlers from pre-existing scripted feuds and storylines. Wrestlers portrayed villains, heroes, or less distinguishable characters in the scripted events that built tension and culminated in a wrestling match or series of matches.

The top feud heading into Bound for Glory was between Sting and Hulk Hogan. On the January 4, 2010 special 3 hour Monday night episode of TNA Impact!, Hulk Hogan and Eric Bischoff debuted in TNA. From the moment they arrived, Sting suspected that they were up to a conspiracy and tried to warn TNA President Dixie Carter to no avail. The master plan was soon revealed on October 10 at Bound for Glory 2010, when Hulk Hogan, Eric Bischoff, Jeff Jarrett, Abyss and newly crowned TNA World Heavyweight Champion Jeff Hardy were revealed to be "They", an entity Abyss claimed for several months would come forth at the event. The group subsequently named themselves Immortal and Sting, along with his ally Kevin Nash, who had stuck by him and his suspicion for months, were invited to join the group but the two left the company. After several months of Immortal controlling TNA, Sting returned on the March 3, 2011 episode of Impact! to win the TNA World Heavyweight Championship, retaining the belt during his feud with Immortal until on June 12 at Slammiversary IX, where he began a short back-and-forth rivalry with Mr. Anderson for the title and eventually won it back. During this time, Sting began to assume a maniacal, Joker-like gimmick dubbed the "Insane Icon". On August 8 at Hardcore Justice, Sting lost the title to Kurt Angle after interference from Hogan, recruiting Angle to Immortal in the process. After Hogan cost Sting the opportunity to regain the title on two separate occasions in September 2011, Sting started plaguing Hogan to change for the better and fought long-time rival and Immortal member Ric Flair to earn the victory and a match against Hogan on October 16 at Bound for Glory. On the October 6 episode of Impact, Hogan agreed to give TNA back to Dixie Carter if Sting won the match.

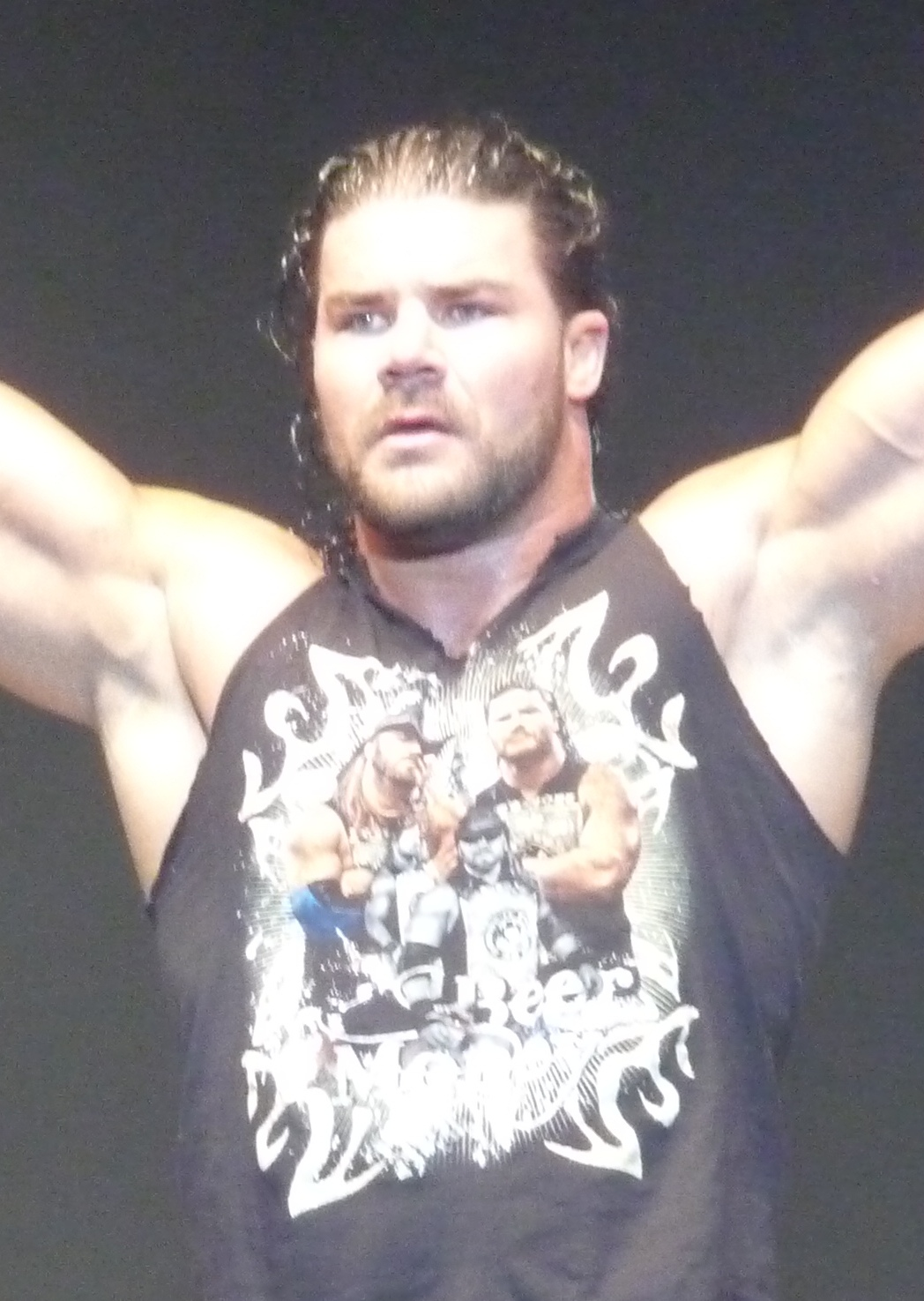
Bobby Roode, winner of the 2011 Bound for Glory Series.

During June, the implementation of a three-months long points tournament referred to as the "Bound for Glory Series", became the focal point in determining a number one contender for the TNA World Heavyweight Championship at Bound for Glory out of twelve top contenders. According to the rules, the top four wrestlers that accumulated the most points that were earned from matches held on Impact!, live shows, and pay per views, would compete in tournament finals matches at No Surrender, where the winner would gain the opportunity to challenge for the TNA World Title at the company's biggest annual spectacle. In September, Bobby Roode, Bully Ray, Gunner and James Storm emerged as the top four contenders heading into No Surrender. At the PPV on September 11, Roode and Bully Ray finished tied in the top of the standings, after Roode defeated Gunner via submission and Bully Ray defeated Storm via disqualification. Roode then defeated Bully Ray later in the night to break the tie and become the number one contender to the TNA World Heavyweight Championship.

A.J. Styles versus Christopher Daniels was another rekindled feud heading into an "I Quit" match at Bound for Glory. On the March 31 episode of Impact!, Daniels returned saving the heroic Fortune group from a beat down by the villain group, Immortal, who had also been responsible for an injury which temporarily sidelined Styles. On April 17 at Lockdown, Daniels teamed with the rest of Fortune to defeat Immortal in a Lethal Lockdown match during which saw the return of Styles seeking retribution against Immortal member Bully Ray. In June, Styles declared he was returning to the X Division for one night when it would be commemorated. Challenged by Daniels, Styles later accepted the match, with the two agreeing not to make the competition compromise their friendship. On July 10 at the X Division-based Destination X PPV, Styles defeated Daniels in the main event. Over the next several weeks, Daniels asked for a rematch which took place on the September 1 episode of Impact!, with Daniels picking up the win. After the match, Daniels refused to shake Styles' hand. On the September 22 episode of Impact!, Daniels kept bragging about his victory over Styles, which eventually led to a brawl between the two that was broken up by Fortune member Kazarian before Daniels then hit Styles, completing his heel turn. Two weeks later it was announced that, under Daniels' request, the two would fight in an "I Quit" match at Bound for Glory.

Another rivalry heading into Bound for Glory was between Rob Van Dam and Jerry Lynn, who fought in a Full Metal Mayhem match. The two reignited their rivalry over their extreme days in the defunct ECW similar to how the X Division operated and on July 10 at Destination X, Van Dam defeated Lynn. Over the next month, Lynn accompanied Van Dam to his matches. On August 8 at Hardcore Justice, Van Dam, ranked number two in the Bound for Glory Series, faced Crimson, ranked number one. In the match, Lynn came in and attacked Crimson, causing Van Dam to lose by disqualification, that cost him not only the match, but several spots in the tournament's standings. On the August 18 episode of Impact!, Lynn ensured a loss for Van Dam in a match against A.J. Styles in similar fashion. On the September 1 episode of Impact!, Lynn turned on Van Dam, costing him a loss in a match with Gunner and the entire tournament as a whole. On the following Impact, Lynn explained his actions saying that he was sick of being in Van Dam's shadow.

Two former group mates Mr. Anderson and Bully Ray, fought in a Falls Count Anywhere Philadelphia Street Fight. Given the ultimatum to join Immortal or go against them, Mr. Anderson became a member of the Immortal group in July 2011, after Immortal member Eric Bischoff assisted him to win the TNA World Heavyweight Championship from Sting on June 12 at Slammiversary IX. On the July 14 edition of Impact, Anderson lost the title back to Sting. Anderson's alliance with Immortal went short-lived as tension grew when Immortal's Bully Ray became the distraction that allowed Kurt Angle to defeat Anderson in a cage match on the July 28 episode of Impact. After Anderson and Bully Ray battled on August 8 at Hardcore Justice, which saw Bully Ray come out as the winner, Immortal later evicted Anderson from the group. Continuing his feud with Bully Ray, eventually on the October 7 edition of Impact, Anderson challenged Bully Ray to an Anything Goes match, which was later accepted by his counterpart.

Samoa Joe versus Crimson versus Matt Morgan was an altercation that headed into the PPV. The feud between Crimson and Samoa Joe continued since the Summer of 2011. Crimson had engaged in conflict with Joe, who was unhelpful to him during an attack from Abyss. Joe eventually claimed that he did not need help when he had his 18-month winning streak going. Competing in the Bound for Glory Series and maintaining a winning streak, Crimson faced Kurt Angle in a match, where Joe gave Crimson the disqualification win after attacking him and forcing him to the sidelines with an ankle injury, effectively eliminating him from the BFG Series. On the September 28 edition of Impact, Crimson returned and challenged Joe to an accepted fight, ending when Matt Morgan fended off Joe, who targeted harm to Crimson's ankle. After losing singles matches to Crimson and Morgan in consecutive weeks, Joe, who was fed up of the two looking out for one another in his business with Crimson, challenged them to a three-way match at Bound for Glory.

TNA X Division Champion Austin Aries defended his title against Brian Kendrick. On September 11 at No Surrender, Austin Aries defeated Brian Kendrick to win the X Division Title for the first time, after Aries returned to the company in June 2011 and pursued the title. On the September 29 edition of Impact, Kendrick won a five-man Ladder match against Alex Shelley, Zema Ion, Kid Kash, and Jesse Sorensen to earn a rematch with Aries for the title.

TNA Women's Knockout Champion Winter defended her title against Velvet Sky, Mickie James, and Madison Rayne, with Karen Jarrett serving as special guest referee. Over the Summer of 2011, Winter feuded with Mickie James, alternating reigns with the title, until eventually Winter regained the championship on September 11 at No Surrender. On the September 15 edition of Impact, Velvet Sky defeated Angelina Love to earn a shot at the Knockouts Title, and over the next two weeks, Mickie James and Madison Rayne did the same after defeating Brooke Tessmacher and Tara in singles matches, respectively. Karen Jarrett, who was newly appointed the Commissioner of the Knockouts, became the referee of the match.

== Reception ==
Bound for Glory was met with mixed to positive reviews. Canadian Online Explorer writer of the SLAM! Sports section, Matt Bishop, graded the entire event a 7.5 out of 10, which was essentially higher than the previous year's 7 out of 10. Bishop felt that the company delivered its best show in recent memory that was marred by a "horrendous finish in the main event", but went on to call the action, "outstanding". The highest rated match was given to the Angle-Roode main event match which received 7.5 out of 10. For other top rated matches, Anderson-Bully Ray received a 7 out of 10, Rob Van Dam-Jerry Lynn got 7 out of 10, and Austin Aries-Brian Kendrick got 7 out of 10. The lowest rated match was the Velvet Sky-Winter-Madison Rayne-Mickie James that was given 3 out of 10.

411 Mania writer of the wrestling section, Colin Rinehart, rated the event an 8.5 out of 10, praising the show as "far and away TNA's best PPV of the year so far" and "probably the most consistently entertaining Bound for Glory yet in company history", giving it an "Easy and enthusiastic Thumbs Up." The top two highest rated bouts were given to Van Dam-Lynn that got 3 and 3/4 out of 5 stars and the Angle-Roode main event got 3 and a 1/2 out of 5 stars. The lowest went to Velvet Sky-Winter-Madison Rayne-Mickie James at 1 and a 1/4 stars.

== Results ==
No.	Results	Stipulations	Times
1^{P}	Mexican America (Anarquia and Hernandez) (c) (with Rosita and Sarita) defeated Ink Inc. (Jesse Neal and Shannon Moore) (with Toxxin)	Tag team match for the TNA World Tag Team Championship	08:02
2	Austin Aries (c) defeated Brian Kendrick	Singles match for the TNA X Division Championship	10:27
3	Rob Van Dam defeated Jerry Lynn	Full Metal Mayhem match	13:14
4	Crimson defeated Matt Morgan and Samoa Joe	Three-Way match	07:14
5	Mr. Anderson defeated Bully Ray	Falls Count Anywhere Philadelphia Street Fight	14:33
6	Velvet Sky defeated Winter (c) (with Angelina Love), Madison Rayne and Mickie James	Four-Way match for the TNA Women's Knockout Championship with Karen Jarrett as special guest referee	08:31
7	A.J. Styles defeated Christopher Daniels	"I Quit" match	13:42
8	Sting defeated Hulk Hogan (with Ric Flair) by submission	Singles match for control of TNA with Garett Bischoff as special guest referee (Note: Since Sting won, Dixie Carter regained control of TNA. Had Hogan won, he would have remained in power and Sting would have been forced to leave TNA.)	10:43
9	Kurt Angle (c) defeated Bobby Roode	Singles match for the TNA World Heavyweight Championship	14:15
(c) / – the champion(s) heading into the match; P / – the match was broadcast on the pre-show
