= Slammiversary IX =

2011 Total Nonstop Action Wrestling pay-per-view event

- Promotional poster featuring various TNA wrestlers
- Promotion: Total Nonstop Action Wrestling
- Date: June 12, 2011
- City: Orlando, Florida
- Venue: Impact Zone
- Attendance: 1,100

Pay-per-view chronology
← Previous; Sacrifice	Next → Destination X

Slammiversary chronology
← Previous; VIII	Next → 10

Slammiversary IX was a professional wrestling pay-per-view event produced by Total Nonstop Action Wrestling (TNA), which took place on June 12, 2011, at the Impact Wrestling Zone in Orlando, Florida. It was the seventh event under the Slammiversary chronology.

In October 2017, with the launch of the Global Wrestling Network, the event became available to stream on demand.

== Storylines ==
Other on-screen personnel
Commentator	Mike Tenay
Commentator	Taz
Ring announcer	Jeremy Borash
Referee	Rudy Charles
Referee	Mark "Slick" Johnson
Referee	Andrew Thomas
Interviewers	Jeremy Borash

Slammiversary featured eight professional wrestling matches that involved different wrestlers from pre-existing scripted feuds and storylines. Wrestlers portrayed villains, heroes, or less distinguishable characters in the scripted events that built tension and culminated in a wrestling match or series of matches.

The predominant feud on the card was between Jeff Jarrett and Kurt Angle. Jarrett wanted Kurt's Olympic Gold Medal since he had already "taken away everything else" from Angle, including his wife and kids. TNA officials made the match a #1 contender's match as well, meaning the winner would be next in line to challenge for the TNA World Heavyweight Championship. Karen Jarrett, Kurt's ex-wife and Jeff's current wife, had been costing Kurt the matches against Jeff at the last few pay-per-views. Angle enlisted the aid of Chyna to get rid of Karen, but this didn't work. Angle confronted Karen, and after a scuffle between the two of them and Jeff, Karen fell down a flight of stairs. This injured her to the point that she would not be able to attend the match at Slammiversary.

The second main feud centered around the TNA World Heavyweight Championship. Mr. Anderson won the #1 contender's spot a month prior. He tried to get into champion Sting's head by attacking him after his match with Rob Van Dam at Sacrifice, and by dressing up like 1980s-era Sting. Anderson then invited a man from Sting's past, Disco Inferno, to Impact Wrestling, and bloodied him with a microphone. Anderson continued to taunt Sting's past by having Eric Young imitate The Great Muta to recreate and mock a classic match that the two once had. However, a distraction from Sting allowed Young to win the match. Young and Sting then teamed against Gunner and Mr. Anderson, but Eric Young's comedic antics cost them the match. A frustrated Sting attacked Mr. Anderson backstage and rubbed facepaint all over him, and skewed his own facepaint to make himself resemble an evil villain, having finally reached the boiling point.

Meanwhile, A.J. Styles and Bully Ray were also feuding. During a four-way match on Impact Wrestling, Ray powerbombed Styles off the stage and through a set of tables. This injured Styles' neck and put him out of action. Styles' faction Fortune enlisted the help of Styles' old friend Christopher Daniels to step in and take his place for the Lockdown pay-per-view. Styles returned at the end of the Lethal Lockdown match between Fortune and Bully Ray's Immortal faction, attacked Ray and cost his team the match. Styles' feud with Ray continued, with Tommy Dreamer getting involved as well, giving Styles a piledriver to try to reinjure his neck. Styles and Dreamer then met one-on-one at Sacrifice in a No Holds Barred match. Styles had the match won, but interference from Bully Ray gave Dreamer the opening to piledrive him on a table and win the match. This led to a Street Fight between the teams of Styles and Daniels and Bully Ray and Dreamer, which Styles and Daniels won. However, the war of words continued between Styles and Bully Ray, and they decided to settle it in a Last Man Standing match at Slammiversary.

New TNA Women's Knockout Champion Mickie James was involved in a match against newcomer Winter, and bloodied her up by accident during the match. Angelina Love, Winter's partner, viciously attacked James because of what she had done, which led to a tag team match where James teamed up with her former rival Tara to take on the team of Love and Winter. Love won the match by scoring a pinfall victory over James, earning a title shot at the PPV.

Samoa Joe let the "undefeated" rookie Crimson be brutalized by Abyss. Crimson had issues with it and confronted Joe about abandoning him to be attacked by Abyss. Joe then decided to get into Crimson's head by brutalizing Crimson's older brother, Amazing Red. Crimson saved his brother, but was then attacked by Samoa Joe at a bar.

Eric Bischoff and Hulk Hogan decided to try to rid TNA of their legendary X Division to rebel against the overbearing "Network" a.k.a. Spike, who was overstepping their boundaries in terms of power. Bischoff decided to try to get an Immortal member to win the TNA X Division Championship, so he booked a match between Abyss and then-champ Kazarian, which Abyss ended up winning. Brian Kendrick decided to lead a rebellion against Bischoff and Hogan in the name of the X Division and demanded a match against Abyss. Kendrick lost the match, but still demanded another rematch. However, Kazarian also felt like he deserved a title shot, too. Bischoff put the two of them in a #1 contender's bout, which ended in a time limit draw. They were granted five extra minutes to settle their differences, but Abyss came down to the ring and brutalized the two of them. Kendrick and Kazarian then confronted Abyss backstage, where Abyss said goodbye to his dangerous weapon "Janice" that Kazarian was trying to use as ransom, and then granted the two men a three-way match at the PPV for the title. Abyss then promised he wouldn't destroy the title, but keep it, due to the teachings of ancient Chinese war strategist Sun Tzu.

Scott Steiner and Matt Morgan started ripping on each other in promos, and then Morgan attacked Steiner backstage. They had a short brawl, with Morgan gaining the upper hand during the brawl. Steiner got revenge a couple of weeks later by attacking Morgan during a match and making Morgan lose.

Robert Roode's shoulder injury at the hands of Immortal gave Eric Bischoff the right to strip Beer Money, Inc. of the TNA World Tag Team Championship. However, Alex Shelley, whose partner Chris Sabin was injured at the hands of Mexican America, was given permission by The Network to defend the tag titles for Roode, along with James Storm, so Beer Money could keep the gold. Eric Bischoff chose The British Invasion to be the opponents of the new "Gun Money" team at the PPV. Before that, though, the duo faced off against Mexican America on Impact Wrestling. Gun Money lost the match when Alex Shelley inadvertently gave James Storm a superkick to the jaw.

== Results ==
No.	Results	Stipulations	Times
1	Gun Money (Alex Shelley and James Storm) (c) (with Bobby Roode) defeated The British Invasion (Douglas Williams and Magnus)	Tag team match for the TNA World Tag Team Championship	10:57
2	Matt Morgan defeated Scott Steiner	Singles match	09:20
3	Abyss (c) defeated Brian Kendrick and Kazarian	Three-way match for the TNA X Division Championship	12:05
4	Crimson defeated Samoa Joe	Singles match	10:33
5	Mickie James (c) defeated Angelina Love (with Winter)	Singles match for the TNA Women's Knockout Championship	08:03
6	Bully Ray defeated A.J. Styles	Last Man Standing match	20:18
7	Mr. Anderson defeated Sting (c)	Singles match for the TNA World Heavyweight Championship	15:52
8	Kurt Angle defeated Jeff Jarrett by submission	Singles match (Note: Since Angle won, he became the #1 contender for the TNA World Heavyweight Championship. Had Jarrett won, he would have received Angle's Olympic gold medal.)	17:42
(c) / – the champion(s) heading into the match

== See also ==
- Triplemanía XIX
