= TNA Sacrifice (2011) =

2011 Total Nonstop Action Wrestling pay-per-view event

Sacrifice (2011)
- Promotional poster featuring Sting and Rob Van Dam
- Promotion: Total Nonstop Action Wrestling
- Date: May 15, 2011
- City: Orlando, Florida
- Venue: Impact Zone
- Attendance: 1,100
- Tagline: "Will One Man's Legacy Fulfill Another Man's Dream? "

Pay-per-view chronology
| ← Previous; Lockdown | Next → Slammiversary IX |

Sacrifice chronology
| ← Previous; 2010 | Next → 2012 |

The 2011 Sacrifice was a professional wrestling pay-per-view (PPV) event produced by Total Nonstop Action Wrestling (TNA) promotion, which took place on May 15, 2011 at the Impact Zone in Orlando, Florida. It was the seventh Sacrifice event.

The event featured the return of Chyna to in-ring competition for the first time since 2002; in what would ultimately be her last match.

In October 2017, with the launch of the Global Wrestling Network, the event became available to stream on demand.

== Storylines ==
Other on-screen personnel
| Commentator | Mike Tenay |
| Commentator | Taz |
| Ring announcer | Jeremy Borash |
| Referee | Rudy Charles |
| Referee | Mark "Slick" Johnson |
| Referee | Andrew Thomas |
| Interviewers | Jeremy Borash |

Sacrifice featured nine professional wrestling matches that involved different wrestlers from pre-existing scripted feuds and storylines. Wrestlers portrayed villains, heroes, or less distinguishable characters in the scripted events that built tension and culminated in a wrestling match or series of matches.

The primary storyline which was featured at Sacrifice was between defending champion Sting and Rob Van Dam for the TNA World Heavyweight Championship. At Lockdown Sting defeated both RVD and Mr. Anderson in a Three Way Steel Cage match to retain his championship after he pinned Anderson, also during the match RVD refused to hit Sting with steel pipe when Hulk Hogan gave it to him. On the following edition of Impact April 21, Sting chose RVD to be his opponent at Sacrifice due to his good actions at Lockdown.

== Results ==
| No. | Results | Stipulations | Times |
|---|---|---|---|
| 1 | Mexican America (Anarquia and Hernandez) (with Rosita and Sarita) defeated Ink Inc. (Jesse Neal and Shannon Moore) | Tag team match | 09:39 |
| 2 | Brian Kendrick defeated Robbie E (with Cookie) | Singles match | 06:41 |
| 3 | Mickie James (c) defeated Madison Rayne | Singles match for the TNA Women's Knockout Championship (since Mickie won Tara was free from Madison, had Madison won Tara would have remained under contract to Madison) | 06:57 |
| 4 | Kazarian (c) defeated Max Buck | Singles match for the TNA X Division Championship | 11:21 |
| 5 | Crimson defeated Abyss | Singles match | 10:43 |
| 6 | Beer Money, Inc. (James Storm and Robert Roode) (c) defeated Immortal (Chris Harris and Matt Hardy) | Tag team match for the TNA World Tag Team Championship | 13:51 |
| 7 | Tommy Dreamer defeated A.J. Styles | No Disqualification match | 13:04 |
| 8 | Chyna and Kurt Angle defeated Jeff Jarrett and Karen Jarrett by submission | Mixed tag team match | 10:19 |
| 9 | Sting (c) defeated Rob Van Dam | Singles match for the TNA World Heavyweight Championship | 12:43 |
(c) / – the champion(s) heading into the match
