= TNA Turning Point (2011) =

2011 Total Nonstop Action Wrestling pay-per-view event

Turning Point (2011)
- Promotional poster featuring Jeff Hardy
- Promotion: Total Nonstop Action Wrestling
- Date: November 13, 2011
- City: Orlando, Florida
- Venue: Impact Zone
- Attendance: 1,100

Pay-per-view chronology
← Previous; Bound for Glory	Next → Final Resolution

Turning Point chronology
← Previous; 2010	Next → 2012

The 2011 Turning Point was a professional wrestling pay-per-view event produced by Total Nonstop Action Wrestling (TNA) promotion, that took place on November 13, 2011 at the Impact Wrestling Zone in Orlando, Florida. It was the eighth event under the Turning Point chronology.

In October 2017, with the launch of the Global Wrestling Network, the event became available to stream on demand.

== Storylines ==
Other on-screen personnel
Commentator	Mike Tenay
Commentator	Taz
Ring announcer	Christy Hemme
Referee	Brian Stiffler
Referee	Earl Hebner
Referee	Brian Hebner
Interviewers	Jeremy Borash

Turning Point featured eleven professional wrestling matches that involved different wrestlers from pre-existing scripted feuds and storylines. Wrestlers portrayed villains, heroes, or less distinguishable characters in the scripted events that built tension and culminated in a wrestling match or series of matches.

== Results ==
No.	Results	Stipulations	Times
1	Robbie E (with Robbie T) defeated Eric Young (c)	Singles match for the TNA Television Championship	07:50
2	Mexican America (Anarquia, Hernandez and Sarita) (c) (with Rosita) defeated Ink Inc. (Jesse Neal, Shannon Moore and Toxxin)	Six-person tag team match for the TNA World Tag Team Championship	08:28
3	Austin Aries (c) defeated Jesse Sorensen and Kid Kash	Three-way match for the TNA X Division Championship	12:54
4	Rob Van Dam defeated Christopher Daniels	No Disqualification match	11:17
5	Crimson vs. Matt Morgan ended in a double disqualification	Singles match	12:06
6	Abyss and Mr. Anderson defeated Immortal (Bully Ray and Scott Steiner)	Tag team match	12:35
7	Gail Kim (with Karen Jarrett and Madison Rayne) defeated Velvet Sky (c)	Singles match for the TNA Women's Knockout Championship	05:52
8	Jeff Hardy defeated Jeff Jarrett (with Karen Jarrett)	Singles match	06:00
9	Bobby Roode (c) defeated A.J. Styles	Singles match for the TNA World Heavyweight Championship	19:33
(c) / – the champion(s) heading into the match
