= Ink Inc. =

Professional wrestling stable

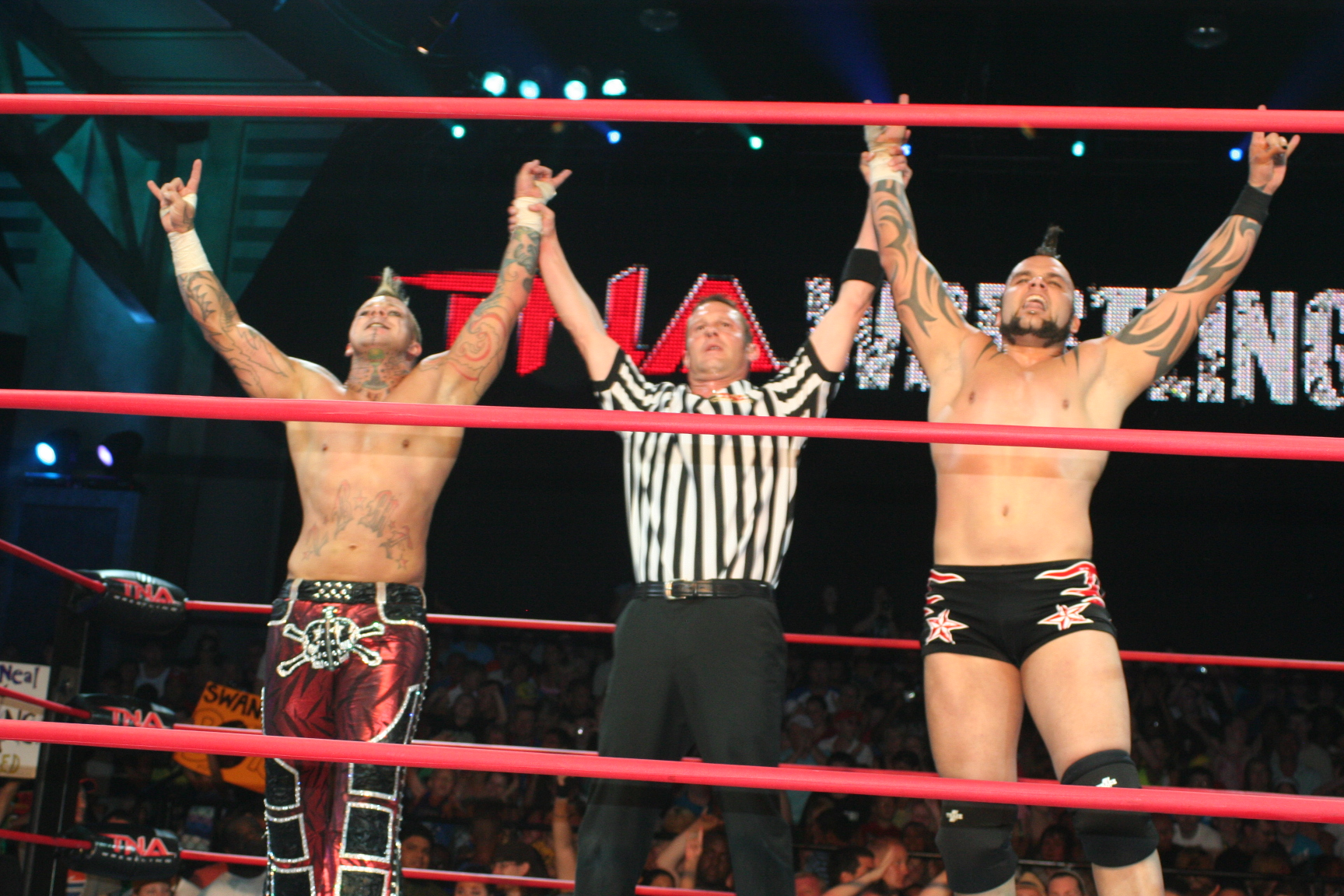
- Shannon Moore (left) and Jesse Neal (right)

Tag team
- Members: Shannon Moore; Jesse Neal; Toxxin (valet)
- Name: Ink Inc.
- Billed heights: 5 ft 8 in (1.73 m) Moore; 6 ft 0 in (1.83 m) - Neal
- Combined billed weight: 406 lb (184 kg)
- Debut: May 3, 2010
- Disbanded: December 12, 2011
- Years active: 2010-2011; 2017

Ink Inc. was a professional wrestling stable, consisting of Shannon Moore, Jesse Neal, and their valet Toxxin, in the professional wrestling promotion Total Nonstop Action Wrestling (TNA).

== History ==
=== Total Nonstop Action Wrestling (2010–2011) ===
On the April 19, 2010, episode of Impact! Shannon Moore insulted the TNA World Tag Team Champion Matt Morgan, who was looking for a new tag team partner, provoking a rivalry between the two. The following week Morgan cost Moore his shot at the TNA X Division Championship and then went on to defend his own championship, teaming with Jesse Neal. After successfully defending the title, Morgan attacked Neal, at which point Moore ran out to aid Neal. This led to the pair forming a tag team known as Ink Inc., and on the May 3 episode of Impact! Moore and Neal defeated Douglas Williams and Brian Kendrick in their first match as a team.

On May 16 at Sacrifice, Ink Inc. failed in their attempt to win the TNA World Tag Team Championship from The Band (Kevin Nash and Scott Hall), when Neal's trainer Brother Ray interfered in the match and attacked Neal. The following month, on the June 17 episode of Impact!, Ink Inc. defeated The Band (Kevin Nash and Eric Young) to advance to the finals of a tournament for a shot at the vacant TNA World Tag Team Championship. In the finals the following week, Ink Inc. was defeated by Beer Money, Inc. (James Storm and Robert Roode), when Brother Ray attacked Neal backstage prior to the match. At the July 26 and 27 tapings of Xplosion Ink Inc. entered a four team tournament to determine the new number one contenders to the TNA World Tag Team Championship. After defeating Generation Me (Jeremy and Max Buck) in the semifinals, Ink Inc. was defeated in the finals by Desmond Wolfe and Magnus. At Bound for Glory, Ink Inc. defeated Eric Young and Orlando Jordan, winning their first match on pay-per-view. On the October 28 episode of Impact!, Ink Inc. received a match for the TNA World Tag Team Championship against The Motor City Machine Guns (Alex Shelley and Chris Sabin) in a three-way match, which also included Generation Me, but failed to win the championship. On December 5 at the Final Resolution pay-per-view, Ink Inc. lost to Beer Money, Inc. in a number one contender's match for the TNA World Tag Team Championship. On the March 3 edition of Impact! Ink Inc. asked for and were granted a shot at Beer Money's TNA World Tag Team Championship at Victory Road. On March 13 at Victory Road, Ink Inc. failed in their attempt to win the TNA World Tag Team Championship. After the match Moore turned heel by refusing to shake hands with the champions and instead spat beer in Storm's face. A similar show of disrespect was carried out by Moore on the March 24 edition of Impact!, after Ink Inc. had been defeated by Crimson and Scott Steiner. On April 17 at Lockdown, Ink Inc. defeated The British Invasion (Douglas Williams and Magnus), Crimson and Scott Steiner and Eric Young and Orlando Jordan in a four tag team steel cage match to become the number one contenders to the TNA World Tag Team Championship. The following month at Sacrifice, Ink Inc. was defeated by Mexican America (Anarquia and Hernandez) becoming faces once again. In the finish of the match, Neal suffered a neck injury, which would sideline him for the next four months. Ink Inc. returned on the September 22 edition of Impact Wrestling, attacking Mexican America, now the TNA World Tag Team Champions, at a tattoo parlour. On the October 13 edition of Impact Wrestling, Toxxin aligned herself with Ink Inc. by saving them from Mexican America. On October 16, during the Bound for Glory Preshow, Ink Inc. unsuccessfully challenged Mexican America for the TNA World Tag Team Championship. On November 13 at Turning Point, Ink Inc. again failed to win the TNA World Tag Team Championship in a six-person tag team match, which also included Toxxin and Mexican America's Sarita. On November 17, Jesse Neal announced that he was parting ways with TNA after the following weekend's house shows. Despite the outburst, Neal appeared on the December 1 edition of Impact Wrestling, teaming with Moore in a three way TNA World Tag Team Championship number one contenders match, where they were defeated by the team of D'Angelo Dinero and Devon. Neal finished his dates with TNA on December 12 and afterwards left the promotion. Soon later, Toxxin also left the promotion.

=== Reunion ===
On July 1, 2017, Moore and Neal defeated Chico Adams and JD Amazing in a tag team match where Neal's AWE Hardcore Championship and Moore's AWE Heavyweight Championship were on the line.
