= Mexican America (professional wrestling) =

Professional wrestling stable

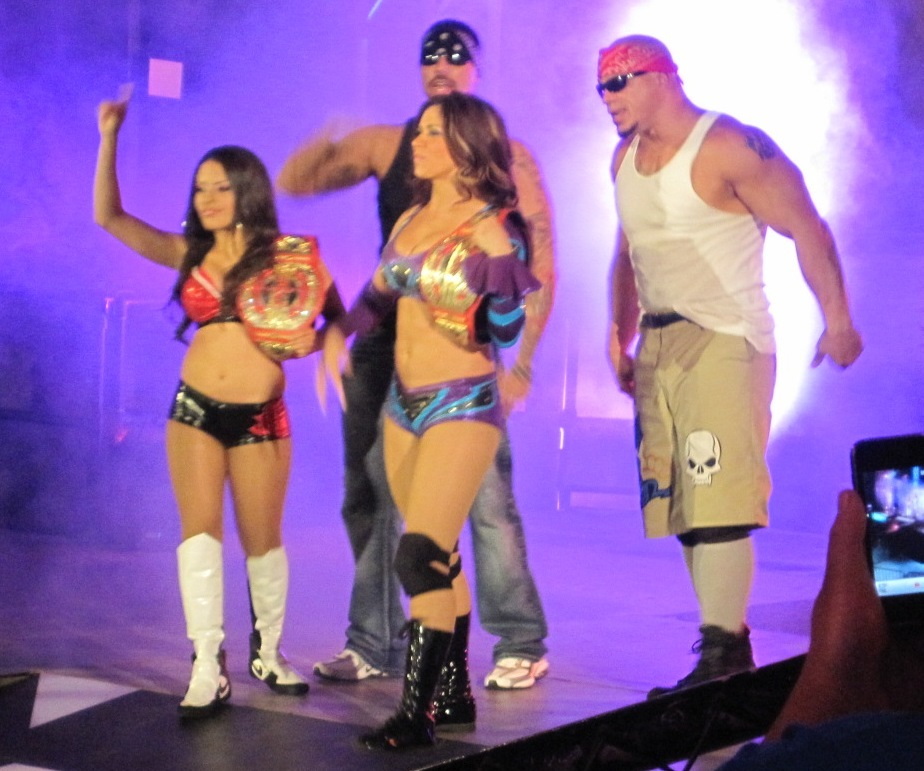
- Mexican America members (Front) Rosita (left) and Sarita (right) holding the TNA Knockouts Tag Team Championship's, (back) Anarquia (left) and Hernandez (right).

Stable
- Name: Mexican America
- Billed from: Mexico
- Former members: Hernandez; Anarquia; Rosita; Sarita
- Debut: March 17, 2011
- Disbanded: June 10, 2012

Mexican America was an American professional wrestling stable in the Total Nonstop Action Wrestling (TNA) promotion, consisting of leader Hernandez, Anarquia, Rosita and Sarita, who were portrayed as villainous anti-Americans, promoting the superiority of Mexican-Americans. While all members were portrayed as Mexican-Americans, Rosita is, in fact, Puerto Rican-American, while Sarita is Canadian, though she has wrestled in Mexico for the majority of her career, and Hernandez is of both Mexican and Puerto Rican descent. Hernandez and Anarquia are former TNA World Tag Team Champions, and Rosita and Sarita are former TNA Knockouts Tag Team Champions. The group's motto was "nada es imposible" (Spanish for "nothing is impossible"), after a tattoo on Hernandez's biceps.

== History ==
=== Formation (2011) ===
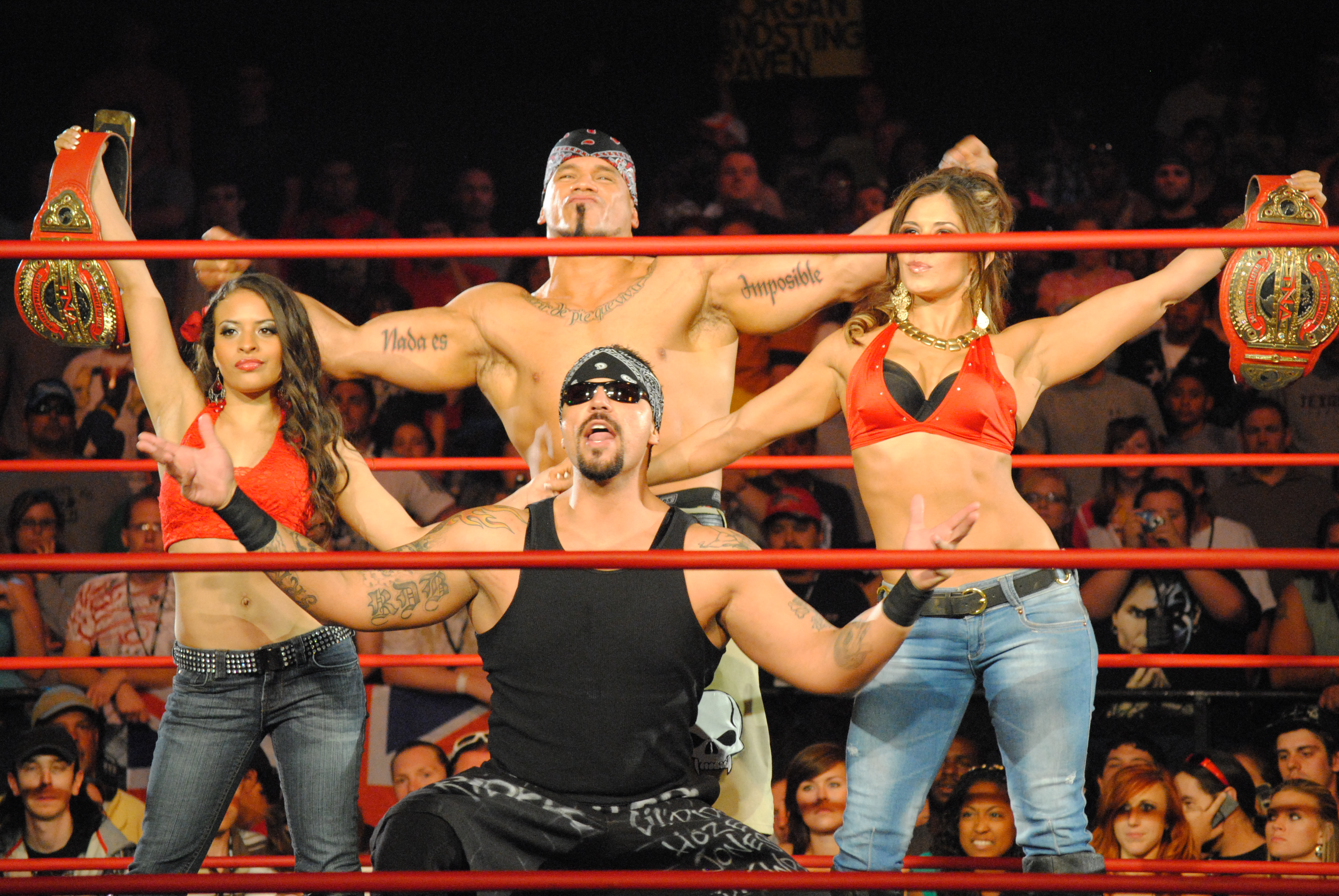
Mexican America members Rosita (left), Hernandez (back), Anarquia (front) and Sarita (right) in 2011.

After spending most of 2010 in Mexico, working with the AAA promotion, Hernandez returned to Total Nonstop Action Wrestling (TNA) from his excursion on the February 10, 2011, episode of its primary television program, Impact!. While Hernandez had worked the past 3½ years in TNA as a face, he was now presented as a heel, when he was hired by the Immortal stable to prevent his old rival Matt Morgan from winning the TNA World Heavyweight Championship. On February 13 at the Against All Odds pay-per-view, Hernandez explained the change in his attitude by claiming that, because of his race, he was treated in the United States like a second-class citizen, while in Mexico he was treated like a star. On the following episode of Impact!, Hernandez aligned himself with storyline cousins Rosita and Sarita. On March 13 at Victory Road, Hernandez defeated Matt Morgan in a First Blood match, after using fake blood on him, following a run–in from a planted fan. On the following episode of Impact!, the alliance of Hernandez, Rosita and Sarita was named Mexican America. The three of them were then defeated in a six person street fight by Morgan, Angelina Love and Winter. After the match, the "fan", who had interfered in the match at Victory Road, once again entered the ring and attacked Morgan. On the March 24 episode of Impact!, he was officially presented as the newest member of Mexican America and named Anarquia. Eventually Hernandez's role as Mexican America's spokesman was given to Anarquia. According to Hernandez this was because he refused to use stereotypical Mexican jargon.

=== Championship success (2011) ===
On March 13 at Victory Road, Rosita and Sarita defeated Angelina Love and Winter to win the TNA Knockouts Tag Team Championship, with Sarita proclaiming that their victory would start a Mexican takeover of TNA. They then went on to successfully defend the title against the teams of The Beautiful People (Love and Velvet Sky), Madison Rayne and Tara and Velvet Sky and Ms. Tessmacher. Meanwhile, after defeating Ink Inc. (Jesse Neal and Shannon Moore) on May 15 at Sacrifice and the team of Alex Shelley and TNA World Tag Team Champion James Storm on the June 9 episode of Impact Wrestling, Hernandez and Anarquia began demanding a shot at the TNA World Tag Team Championship, claiming that they were being held back because of their race. On the July 14 episode of Impact Wrestling, Hernandez and Anarquia defeated The British Invasion (Douglas Williams and Magnus), with help from Rosita, to become the number one contenders to the TNA World Tag Team Championship. However, the following week, Rosita and Sarita, who had recently been sidelined from in-ring action after suffering facial paralysis, lost the TNA Knockouts Tag Team Championship to the team of Ms. Tessmacher and Tara. Rosita and Sarita received a rematch for the title on August 7 at Hardcore Justice, but were again defeated by Tessmacher and Tara. Later that same night, Hernandez and Anarquia received their shot at the TNA World Tag Team Championship, but were defeated by the defending champions, Beer Money, Inc. (Bobby Roode and James Storm). Two days later, at the tapings of the August 18 episode of Impact Wrestling, Hernandez and Anarquia defeated Beer Money, Inc. in a rematch, following interference from the "Mexican Heavyweight Champion" Jeff Jarrett, to win the TNA World Tag Team Championship. On September 11 at No Surrender, Anarquia and Hernandez successfully defended the title against D'Angelo Dinero and Devon, following interference from Rosita and Sarita. Later that month, Mexican America began feuding with Ink Inc., stemming from their match at Sacrifice in May, where Hernandez had legitimately injured Jesse Neal. On October 16, during the Bound for Glory Preshow, Mexican America successfully defended the TNA World Tag Team Championship against Ink Inc. The following month at Turning Point, Anarquia, Hernandez and Sarita defeated Ink Inc.'s Jesse Neal, Shannon Moore and Toxxin in a six person tag team match to retain the TNA World Tag Team Championship.

=== Downfall (2011–2012) ===
On the November 17 episode of Impact Wrestling, Hernandez and Anarquia lost the TNA World Tag Team Championship to Crimson and Matt Morgan. On the following episode of Impact Wrestling, Hernandez and Anarquia failed to regain the title in a rematch. After three months of inactivity, Mexican America returned on the March 22, 2012, episode of Impact Wrestling, when Rosita and Sarita unsuccessfully challenged Eric Young and ODB for the Knockouts Tag Team Championship, while Anarquia and Hernandez failed to capture the World Tag Team Championship from Magnus and Samoa Joe after a distraction from Repo Games host Josh Lewis. On April 27, Anarquia's profile was removed from TNA's official website. His departure from the promotion was confirmed four days later. On June 10 at Slammiversary, Hernandez returned to TNA as a face, confirming Mexican America's disbandment.

== Championships and accomplishments ==
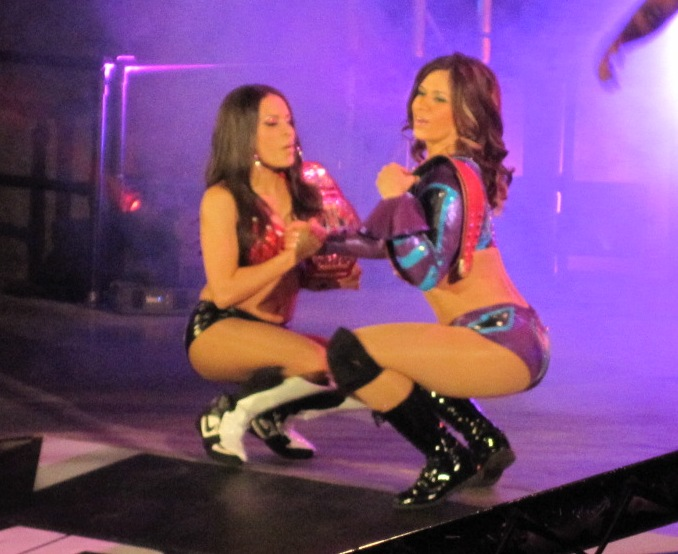
(Left to right) Rosita and Sarita as the TNA Knockouts Tag Team Champions

- Total Nonstop Action Wrestling
  - TNA Knockouts Tag Team Championship (1 time) – Sarita and Rosita
  - TNA World Tag Team Championship (1 time) – Hernandez and Anarquia

== See also ==
- The Latin American Xchange
- Latino World Order
