= Jesse Neal =

American retired professional wrestler (born 1980)

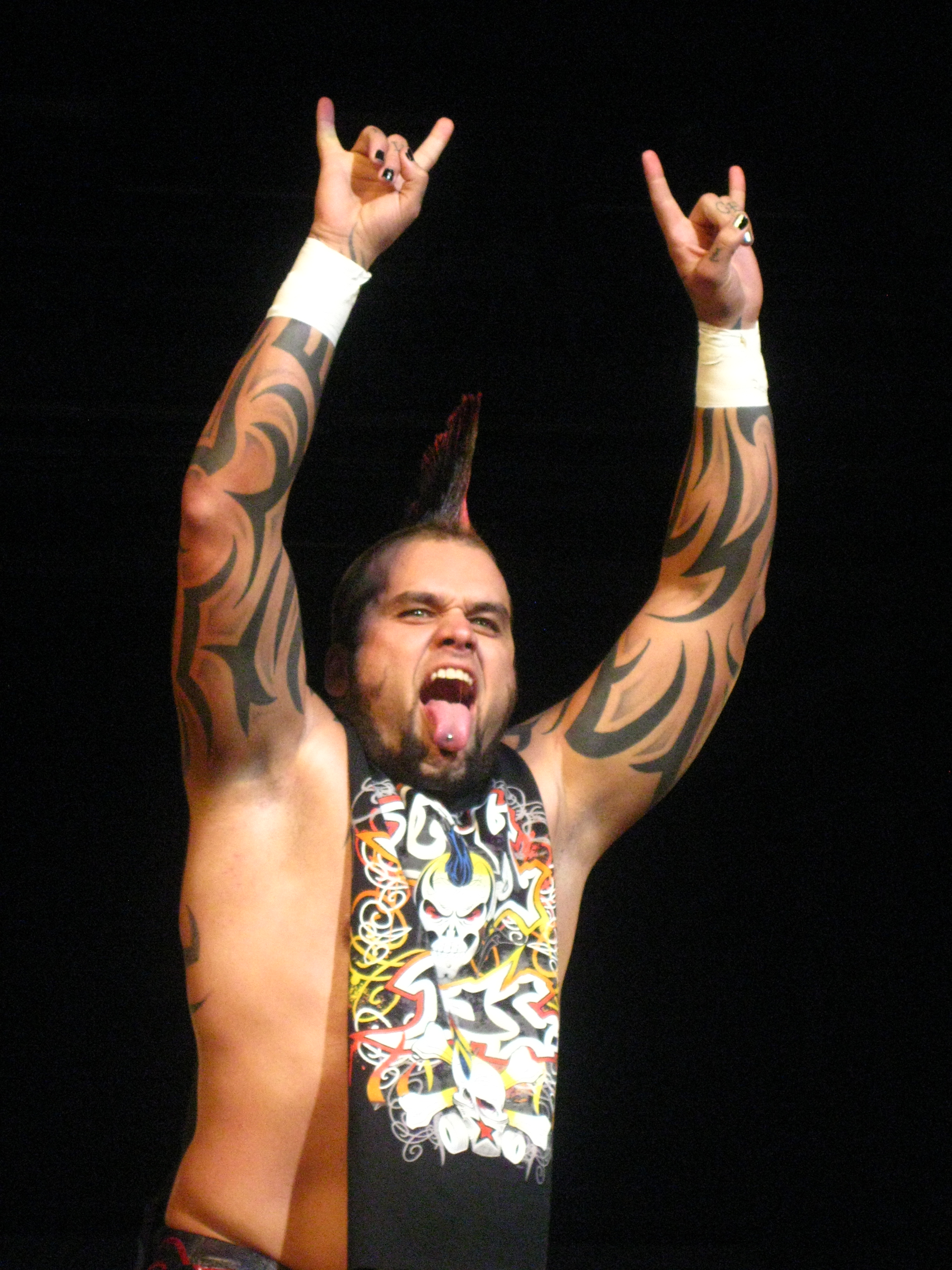
- Neal in 2011.

Personal information
- Born: April 10, 1980 (age 46) Orlando, Florida, U.S.
- Children: 1

Professional wrestling career
- Ring name(s): Jesse Neal; Salvation; Tribal
- Billed height: 6 ft 0 in (1.83 m)
- Billed weight: 220 lb (100 kg)
- Trained by: Devon Hughes; Mark LoMonaco
- Debut: 2008
- Military service
- Allegiance: United States
- Branch: United States Navy
- Service years: 1998–2002
- Rank: Petty officer third class
- Unit: USS Cole

Jesse Neal (born April 10, 1980) is an American professional wrestler and a former member of the U.S. military. He is best known for working for Total Nonstop Action Wrestling (TNA), where he was one half of the tag team Ink Inc., with his former partner Shannon Moore. He performed for Atomic Revolutionary Wrestling (ARW) where he was the former 2-time ARW Heavyweight champion and former 2-time ARW Hardcore champion.

== Military career ==
Neal served in the United States Navy from 1998 to 2002, reaching the rank of petty officer 3rd Class and was on board USS Cole, when it was suicide bombed on October 12, 2000. Neal has a tattoo on his right forearm of the initials of his best friend, who was killed in the attack. After the attack Neal was diagnosed with posttraumatic stress disorder and spent over a year on shore duty before finishing his four-year stint with the Navy in 2002.

== Professional wrestling career ==
=== Training and early career ===
In May 2007, Neal began training and wrestling under Team 3D at their Academy of Professional Wrestling and Sports Entertainment, using the ring name "Tribal". He then wrestled on the independent circuit.

=== Total Nonstop Action Wrestling ===
==== Debut (2009) ====
In 2009, Neal signed a contract with professional wrestling promotion Total Nonstop Action Wrestling (TNA). He made his first appearance in TNA at Destination X, wearing his Naval uniform, where he first introduced the match between Brutus Magnus and Eric Young and then confronted Sheik Abdul Bashir before singing "God Bless America". He made his first Impact! appearance on April 9 in a backstage interview, where TNA wrestler Rhino offered to train Neal to become a professional wrestler and fulfill his dream.

Neal wrestled his first match for TNA on the June 4 episode of Impact!, losing to Matt Morgan. Neal began an angle, where Rhino got frustrated with Neal while training him because of mistakes by Neal. On August 13 edition of Impact!, Rhino and Neal were booked to lose a tag team match against World Elite (Eric Young and Sheik Abdul Bashir). Neal lost the match after making a "rookie mistake" by refusing to tag Rhino and instead going after Bashir. After the match, Rhino turned heel by delivering a Gore to Neal. On August 27 Rhino defeated Neal, but the referee of the match ended up reversing the decision afterwards when Rhino once again delivered a Gore to Neal. Brother Devon ran in to save Neal from a further beating and the following week Team 3D announced that they were going to train him at their wrestling school.

==== Alliance with Team 3D (2009–2010) ====
Over the next few weeks, while Neal spent time off television, Team 3D and Rhino would butt heads over the state of the three's future in TNA, with Rhino eventually convincing 3D to band together to defend their spots from young talent they felt was expressly backed by TNA management. On the November 19 edition of Impact!, Neal returned to television with a new look featuring a spiked mohawk and tongue and lip piercings, turning heel by interfering on the gang's behalf to help them win the second of two consecutive street fights against Matt Morgan, Hernandez, and D'Angelo Dinero. In the ensuing backstage interview, Neal displayed the savage demeanor of his Tribal gimmick as his three trainers heralded him as "the real future of TNA". On the December 3 edition of Impact! Neal was defeated in his comeback match by D'Angelo Dinero. The following week Neal picked up his first victory in TNA by pinning Hernandez in a four-on-three handicap match, where he teamed up with Team 3D and Rhino to face Morgan, Hernandez and Suicide. At Final Resolution Morgan, Hernandez, Dinero and Suicide defeated Neal, Team 3D and Rhino in an eight-man elimination tag team match. When Hulk Hogan and Eric Bischoff took over TNA at the beginning of 2010, Neal's angle with Rhino and Team 3D was discontinued, as Team 3D turned face in order to feud with The Nasty Boys (Jerry Sags and Brian Knobs), while Rhino and Neal were taken off TV altogether. Neal returned on the February 4 edition of Impact! in a match, where he was squashed by Samoa Joe. On the February 25 edition of Impact! Neal turned face and re-formed his alliance with Team 3D by helping them defeat the Nasty Boys in a tables match.

==== Ink Inc. (2010–2011) ====
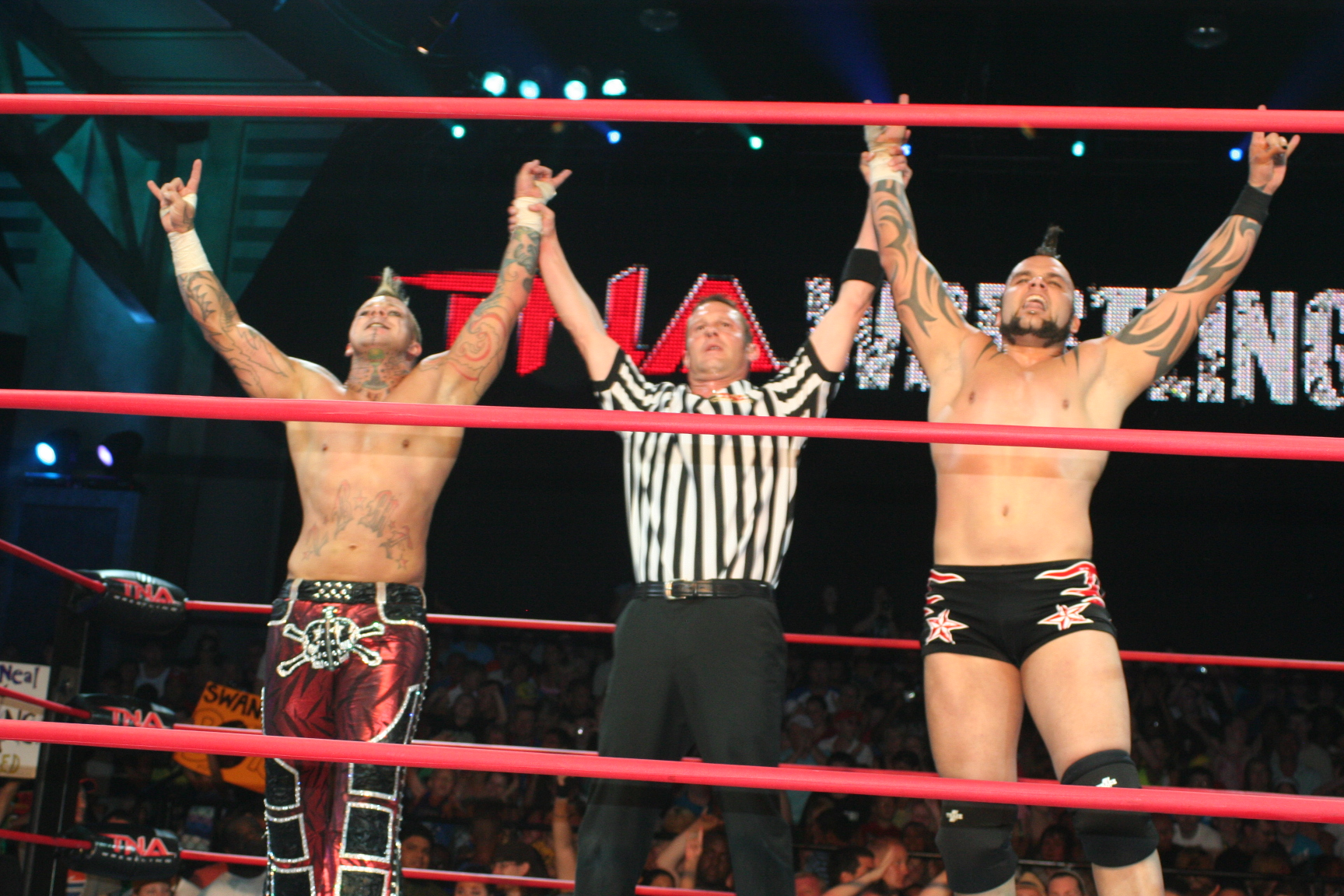
Ink Inc. in 2010

On the April 26 edition of Impact!, Neal, after receiving Team 3D's blessing, teamed with Matt Morgan to defend his TNA World Tag Team Championship against Team 3D. The match ended when The Band (Kevin Nash and Scott Hall) attacked Team 3D, while Morgan turned on Neal. After the match, Neal called out Morgan and then brawled with him, before Shannon Moore, whom Morgan had attacked earlier in the show, came out and helped Neal take care of Morgan. This led to the formation of the new tag team, Ink Inc., and on the May 3 edition of Impact! Neal and Moore defeated Douglas Williams and Brian Kendrick in their first match as a tag team. The following week Ink Inc. defeated Team 3D, Beer Money, Inc. and The Motor City Machineguns in a four-way match, when Neal pinned Brother Ray with a spear. At Sacrifice Ink Inc. failed in their attempt to win the TNA World Tag Team Championship from The Band (Kevin Nash and Scott Hall), when Brother Ray turned on Neal. The following month at Slammiversary VIII Neal defeated Ray in a singles match after a distraction from the debuting Tommy Dreamer. On the June 17 edition of Impact!, Ink Inc. defeated The Band (Kevin Nash and Eric Young) to advance to the finals of a tournament, where they would meet Beer Money, Inc. for a shot at the vacant TNA World Tag Team Championship. The following week Ink Inc. was defeated by Beer Money, after Brother Ray attacked Neal backstage prior to the match. The following month at Victory Road Neal faced Ray and Devon in a three-way match. During the match the members of Team 3D attacked each other, before Neal accidentally speared Devon and was then pinned by Ray. At the July 26 and 27 tapings of Xplosion Ink Inc. entered a four team tournament to determine the new number one contenders to the TNA World Tag Team Championship. After defeating Generation Me (Jeremy and Max Buck) in the semifinals, Ink Inc. was defeated in the finals by Desmond Wolfe and Magnus. At Bound for Glory, Ink Inc. defeated Eric Young and Orlando Jordan, winning their first match on PPV. On the October 28 edition of Impact!, Ink Inc. received a shot at the TNA World Tag Team Championship against The Motor City Machine Guns in a three-way match, which also included Generation Me, but failed to win the titles. On December 5 at Final Resolution, Ink Inc. was defeated by Beer Money, Inc. in a number one contender's match. On January 10, 2011, Neal announced that he had signed a new three–year deal with TNA. On the March 3 edition of Impact! Ink Inc. asked for and were granted a shot at Beer Money's TNA World Tag Team Championship at Victory Road. On March 13 at Victory Road, Ink Inc. failed in their attempt to win the TNA World Tag Team Championship. After the match Moore turned heel by refusing to shake hands with the champions and instead spat beer in Storm's face. A similar show of disrespect was carried out by Moore on the March 24 edition of Impact!, after Ink Inc. had been defeated by Crimson and Scott Steiner. On April 17 at Lockdown, Ink Inc. defeated The British Invasion (Douglas Williams and Magnus), Crimson and Scott Steiner and Eric Young and Orlando Jordan in a four tag team steel cage match to become the number one contenders to the TNA World Tag Team Championship. Before the May 2, 2011 taping of TNA Impact!, following the killing of Osama bin Laden, Neal, wearing his U.S. Navy uniform and holding an American flag, led the crowd in a rendition of The Star-Spangled Banner. Following this event, Moore once again began working as a face with no reference made to his previous heelish antics. On May 15 at Sacrifice, Ink Inc. was defeated by Mexican America (Anarquia and Hernandez). In the finish of the match, Neal suffered a neck injury, which would sideline him for the next four months. Ink Inc. returned on the September 22 edition of Impact Wrestling, attacking Mexican America, now the TNA World Tag Team Champions, at a tattoo parlour. On the October 13 edition of Impact Wrestling, Toxxin aligned herself with Ink Inc. by saving them from Mexican America. On October 16, during the Bound for Glory Preshow, Ink Inc. unsuccessfully challenged Mexican America for the TNA World Tag Team Championship. On November 13 at Turning Point, Ink Inc. again failed to win the TNA World Tag Team Championship in a six-person tag team match, which also included Toxxin and Mexican America's Sarita. On November 17, Neal announced that he was parting ways with TNA after the following weekend's house shows. Despite the outburst, Neal appeared on the December 1 edition of Impact Wrestling, teaming with Moore in a three way TNA World Tag Team Championship number one contenders match, where they were defeated by the team of D'Angelo Dinero and Devon. On December 12, Neal finished his dates with TNA and afterwards parted ways with the promotion. His final TNA appearance took place on the December 15 edition of Impact Wrestling, where he was DDT'd onto concrete floor by Gunner, before being stretchered out of the arena.

=== Independent circuit (2012–present) ===
Neal returned to the Independent circuit after his TNA release and on December 17, Neal defeated JD Amazing, on January 18, 2012, at Ring Warriors: Jesse Neal defeated Chasyn Rance. on February 25 at Best of the Best Turmoil, Neal and Derek Drexl defeated Dallas Riley and Gabriel Xavier. on March 29 at Ring Warriors, Neal and Christina Von Eerie defeated Chasyn Rance and Santana Garrett in a mix tag match, on May 30 at Ring Warriors: Neal defeated Francisco Ciatso. on June 2 Neal faced Johnny Vandal for the FOW International Championship but failed to win the title, on July 7, Neal defeated Bobby Wohlferton, on September 8, 2012, at Ring Warriors: Neal faced Vader in a losing effort. on September 22, Neal defeated Maxx Stardom, on September 27, Neal defeated Drake Evans. on November 24, Neal defeated Shawn Prime. On December 15 at Ring Warriors: Neal was in a Battle Royal that was won by Frank Stone. on February 23, 2013, at Ring Warriors: Neal defeated Kory Chavis by disqualification. on March 9, Neal defeated Sean Allen. on April 14, at Ring Warriors: Neal defeated Frank Stone. on April 20, Neal faced Big Vito in a losing effort, on April 27, Neal faced Akbar Farat which ended in a double disqualification. on April 28 at BELIEVE 52 Event, Neal defeated Chasyn Rance in a hair vs hair match. on May 4, Neal faced Drake Evans in a losing effort. on May 18, Neal faced Kory Chavisto for the Vintage Heavyweight Championship but failed to win the title. on May 25, 2013, at Florida Underground Wrestling Throwdown 3, Neal lost to Ryan Nemeth. the next night on May 26 at BELIEVE 53, Neal defeated Josh Hess. on June 9, Neal defeated Andreas Rossi. on June 15, Neal defeated Teddy Stigma. on June 23 at BELIEVE 54, Neal defeated Carlos Rivera. on June 29, Neal faced Derrick Bateman in a losing effort. on August 4, Neal and Brittney Savage defeated Justin Rando and Luscious Latasha. on October 6, Neal defeated Aaron Epic.

On August 31, 2015, at an In Your Face Wrestling event, following a tag team match, Jesse Neal announced he had just wrestled his final match, and he was retiring from professional wrestling. But then he announced his return to wrestling. He is currently wrestling in the Independent circuit. On March 20, 2017, Jesse Neal posted a photo of his ankle, which he had broken at the Team Vision Dojo in Orlando, Florida for an "I Believe in Wrestling" event. Neal was challenging Rhett Giddins for the SCW Florida Heavyweight title.

On November 17, 2017, at Atomic Revolutionary Wrestling's Fatal Feast, Neal defended the ARW Hardcore Championship against JD Amazing, whose title was also on the line, and Vertigo, with James Mitchell as his manager. Neal ended up winning and securing both the Hardcore and ARW Heavyweight Championship. His celebration was cut short as the Brothers In Arms attacked him from behind allowing former ARW Heavyweight Champion, JD Amazing to invoke the 24/7 hardcore title rules and take the title from a fallen Neal.

== Personal life ==
Prior to training at Team 3D's Wrestling Academy, Neal had been working at Blue Martini Orlando. On July 27, 2011, Neal announced that he had gotten engaged to fellow professional wrestler Christina Von Eerie, who worked alongside him in TNA as Toxxin, but their relationship later ended. Neal was married to professional wrestler Brittney Savage, and in December 2013 the pair announced they were expecting their first child, a girl named Brooklyn was born on April 12, 2014. As a result, Neal announced he was cutting back on his professional wrestling dates, only taking bookings in the Orlando area. Neal is best friends with fellow ARW wrestler Shannon Moore.

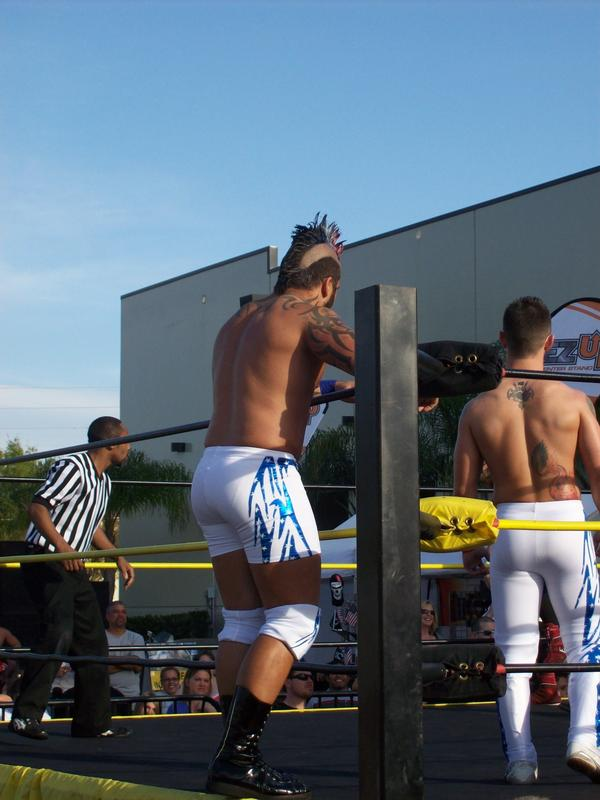
Jesse Neal at WrestleRock in 2008.

== Championships and accomplishments ==
- Atomic Revolutionary Wrestling
  - ARW Hardcore Championship (2 times)
  - ARW Heavyweight Championship (2 times)
- I Believe in Westling
  - SCW Florida Heavyweight Championship (1 time)
- Pro Wrestling Illustrated
  - PWI ranked him #84 of the top 500 singles wrestlers in the PWI 500 in 2011
- Real Canadian Wrestling
  - RCW Canadian Heavyweight Championship (1 time)
- RIOT Pro Wrestling
  - RIOT Tag Team Championships (1 time) - with Chico Adams
- United States Wrestling Alliance
  - USWA Heavyweight Championship (1 time)
  - USWA Tag Team Championship (1 time) – with Glacier
- Vintage Wrestling
  - Vintage Heavyweight Championship (1 time)
