= The British Invasion (professional wrestling) =

Professional wrestling tag team

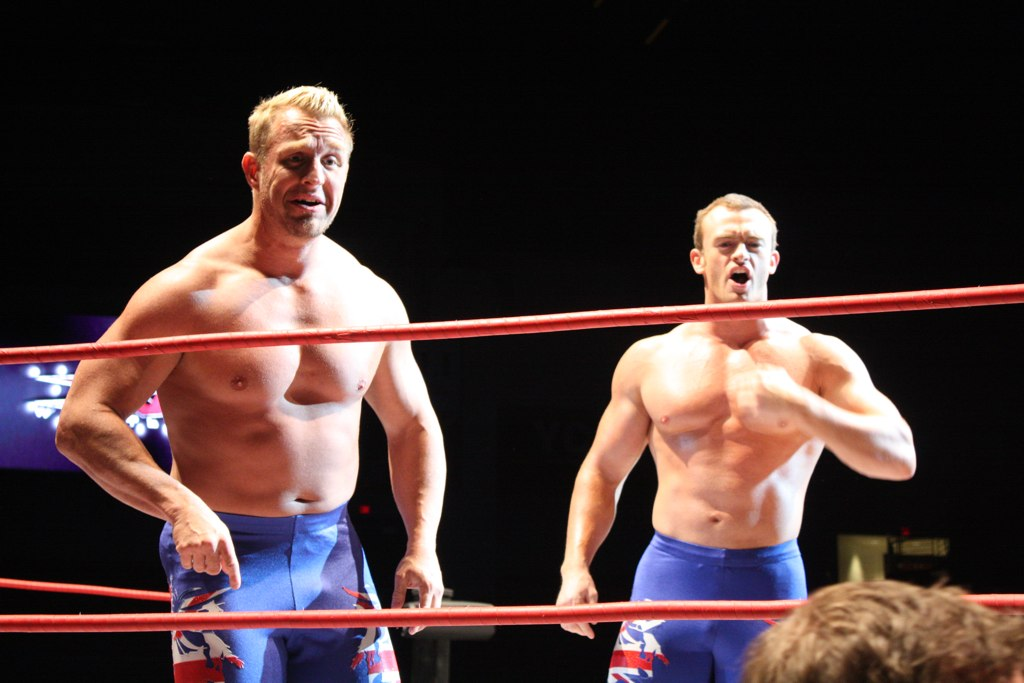
- Doug Williams (left) and Nick Aldis (right) of the British Invasion

Tag team
- Members: Douglas/Doug Williams; Nick Aldis/Brutus Magnus; Rob Terry
- Billed heights: Doug: 5 ft 11 in (1.80 m); Nick: 6 ft 4 in (1.93 m); Rob: 6 ft 5 in (1.96 m)
- Combined billed weight: 781 lb (354 kg)
- Billed from: Great Britain
- Debut: 30 April 2009
- Years active: 2009–2015; 2021–2023

The British Invasion was a professional wrestling alliance stable and later tag team consisting of Nick Aldis, Doug Williams and Rob Terry. They are best known for their time spent in the American promotion Total Nonstop Action Wrestling (TNA).

Williams and Aldis are two-time tag team champions holding the IWGP and TNA World Tag Team Championships.

== History ==
=== Total Nonstop Action Wrestling ===
==== Formation (2009) ====
In late April 2009 on Impact!, Doug Williams, the recently debuted Brutus Magnus and the newly signed Rob Terry attacked Latin American Xchange (LAX) members Hernandez and Homicide, ahead of a scheduled tag team match; the team also stole their Feast or Fired briefcases which guaranteed them TNA World Heavyweight Championship and TNA X Division Championship matches, respectively. Despite Hernandez being unable to compete, Homicide was forced to wrestle in what became a handicap match against Magnus and Williams. Terry acted, as he would for the next few months, as an enforcer who stood at ringside. By winning the match, they progressed to the second round of the Team 3D Invitational Tag Team Tournament. Two weeks later on Impact!, the team attacked Team 3D during an interview, much to the pleasure of Sheik Abdul Bashir and Kiyoshi, who were looking on. Later that evening, they faced the team of Suicide and Amazing Red in the semi-finals and won the match after an interference from The Motor City Machine Guns. The finals took place at the Sacrifice pay-per-view (PPV) on 24 May, with the winners receiving a shot at the TNA World Tag Team Championship against Team 3D the following month. However, the British Invasion was defeated by Beer Money, Inc. (Robert Roode and James Storm), despite Terry preventing the referee's count at one point, when Roode hit Williams with Hernandez's briefcase.

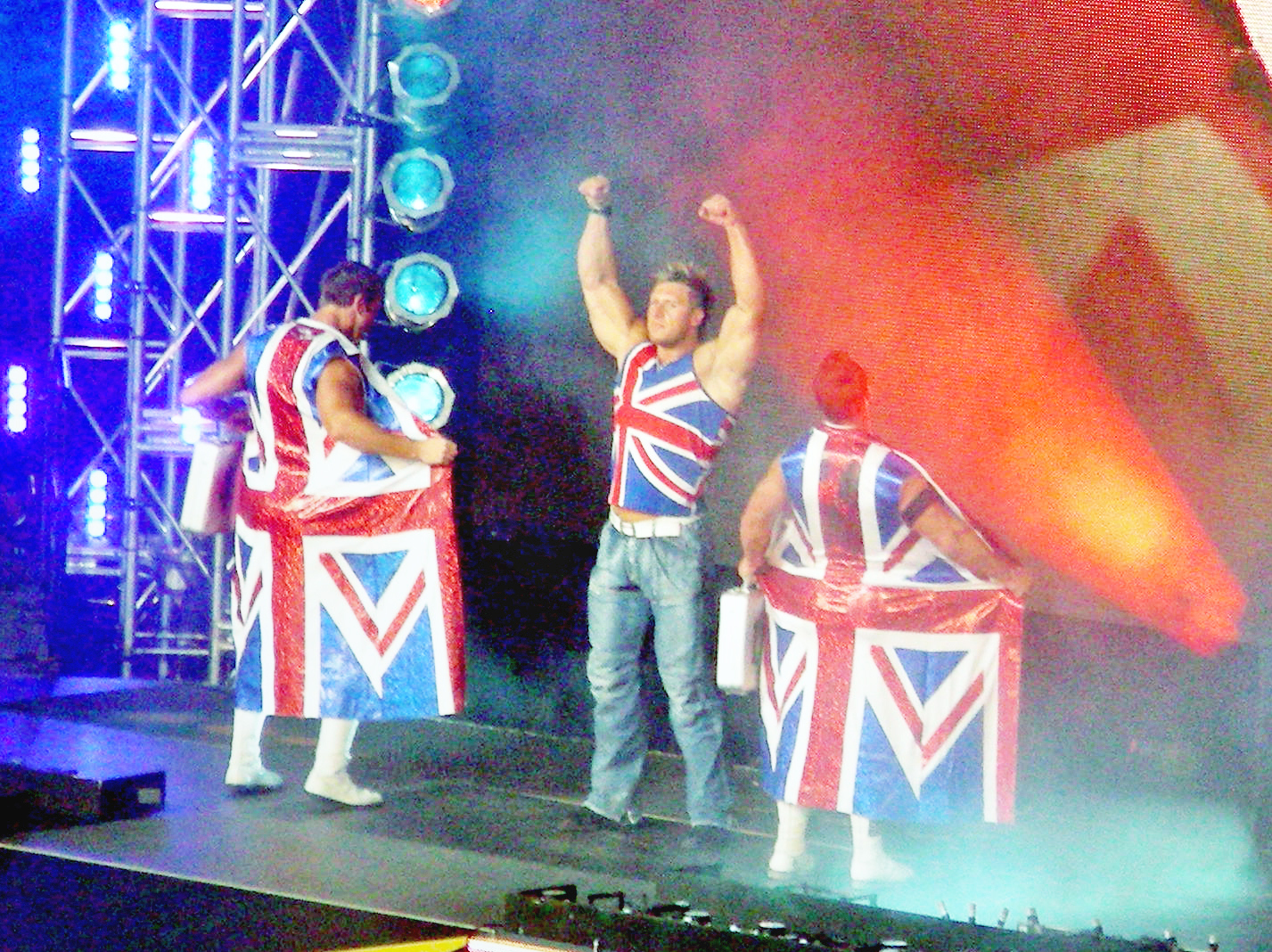
The British Invasion at Slammiversary 2009

Despite having stolen the briefcases, Williams was insulted when interviewer Jeremy Borash questioned him about them, claiming to possess the briefcase fairly and offering to defend it to legitimise his claims. On 28 May, on Impact!, Williams faced Cody Deaner with the X Division briefcase on the line in a Ladder match and won. Afterwards he celebrated with Bashir and Kiyoshi. However, a month later on 10 July's Impact!, Williams lost the briefcase back to Homicide in another Ladder match. The group kept possession of the TNA World Heavyweight contendership briefcase until Hard Justice in mid August when Terry lost it to Hernandez in a nine-second squash match.

==== World Elite (2009–2010) ====
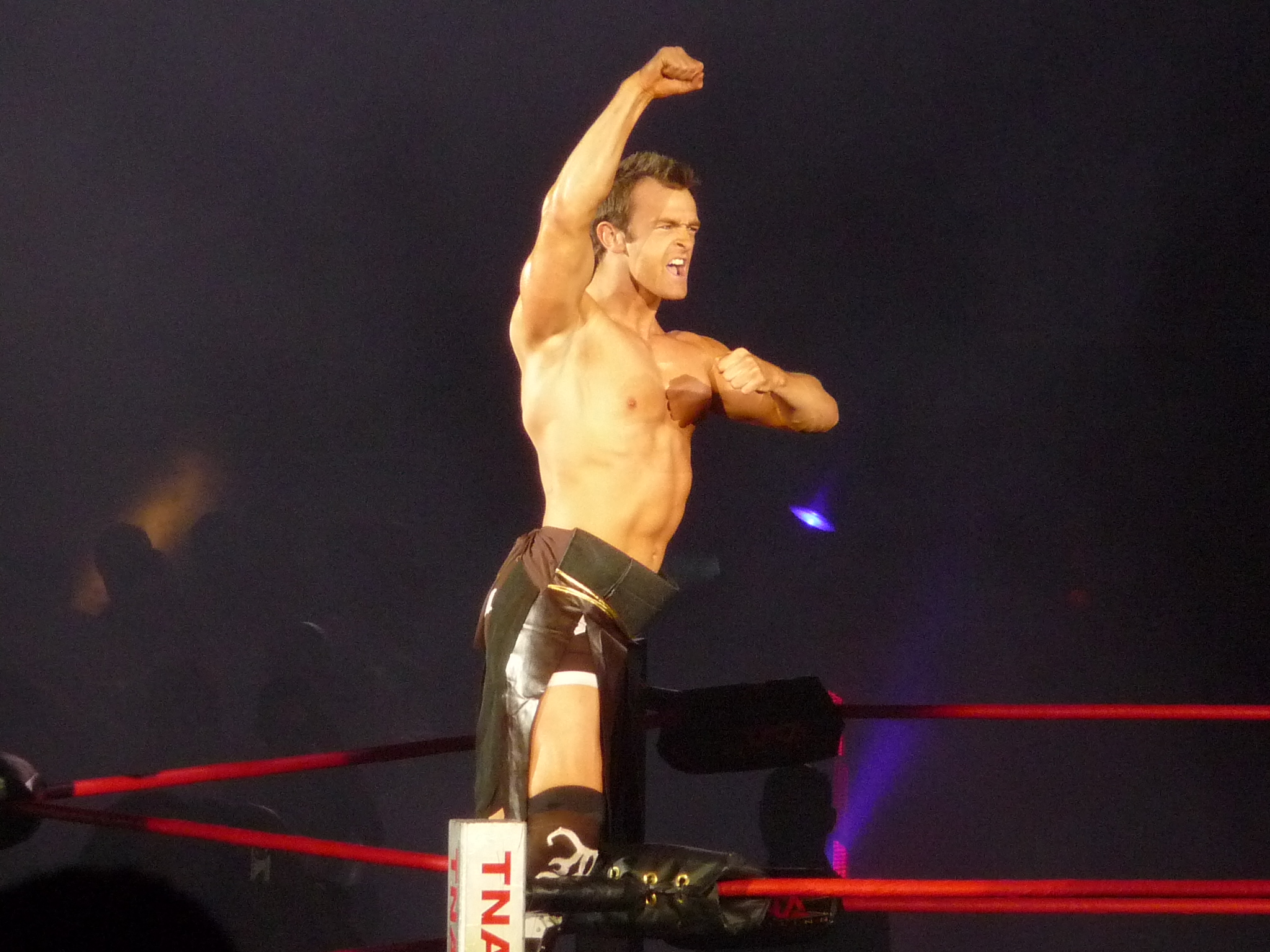
Brutus Magnus

After losing the Team 3D Invitational tournament, the British Invasion tried to interfere in Beer Money, Inc.'s match on 6 May's Impact! but were prevented from doing so by Team 3D, who had gained respect for Beer Money, Inc. The following week, Team 3D revealed in an interview that they had invited the British Invasion to TNA and felt betrayed by their villainous attitude. Williams responded by hitting Devon with a briefcase to cost them their match that week. At Slammiversary, the British Invasion interfered in the TNA World Tag Team Championship match, causing Team 3D to lose their titles to Beer Money, Inc. Earlier in the evening, the British invasion were scheduled to face Rhino and Eric Young in a match, but Young walked out on his partner to be replaced by Rhino's prodigée Jesse Neal, but the British Invasion won regardless. Because Mick Foley wanted a rematch of his own, he persuaded The Main Event Mafia to give him it by promising their tag team, Booker T and Scott Steiner, a World Tag Team Championship match. This angered Team 3D who goaded the Main Event Mafia into a match for the contendership, but once again British Invasion interfered and used the briefcase to cause Team 3D to lose the match and with it, their chances of regaining the TNA World Tag Team Championship. Team 3D countered by costing Williams his Ladder match for the X Division Championship briefcase, but afterwards the British Invasion, helped by Bashir and Kiyoshi, assaulted Team 3D. That Sunday, at the Victory Road PPV, the British Invasion faced Team 3D for the IWGP Tag Team Championship, a championship sanctioned by New Japan Pro-Wrestling (NJPW) which had a working agreement with TNA at the time. The British Invasion lost their match and afterwards Team 3D drove Bashir through a table.

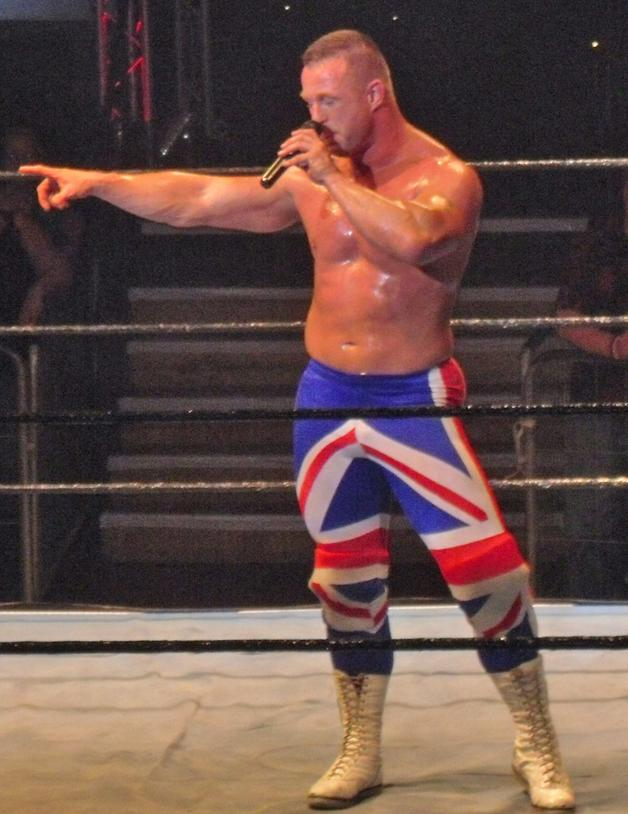
Williams in Union Flag tights

On 23 July edition of Impact! the British Invasion, Bashir and Kiyoshi faced the TNA Originals in a ten-man tag team match, but during the match Eric Young attacked his teammates and afterwards revealed himself to be the leader of the group which would later name themselves as The World Elite. The following week, on Impact!'s 200th episode, the British Invasion received a rematch for Team 3D's IWGP Tag Team Titles, but this time in a Tables match. After the referee was knocked out, chaos ensued with Terry and other members of the World Elite becoming involved. Devon put Williams through a table, but then Eric Young hit Devon with the IWGP title belt, laid Devon over the table and rewoke the referee making him think that Devon had been put through the table. Initially NJPW refused to recognise the title change, but they later acquiesced making the British Invasion officially the IWGP Tag Team Champions.

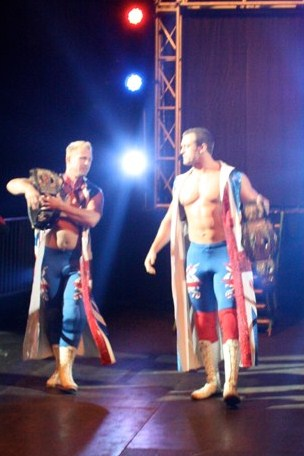
The British Invasion as TNA World Tag Team Champions

After helping them win the IWGP Tag Team Championship, Eric Young revealed the World Elite had allied with The Main Event Mafia. Williams and Terry cemented this by teaming with Mafia members Booker T and Steiner against Team 3D and Beer Money, Inc. Their tag match ended when Terry pinned Roode but even before it had ended a mass riot broke out in the Impact Zone as increasing numbers of members from the Mafia, the Elite and the TNA Originals continued to run into the arena before the fighting spilled out into locker rooms and Universal Studios until actors portraying the police came to break up the action. Also in that evening, Magnus faced Sting in a losing effort. The four tag teams continued to feud, as they met each other in respective tag team matches at Hard Justice, with British Invasion successfully defending their IWGP Tag Team Championship against Beer Money, Inc. In early September, Team 3D, Beer Money, Inc. and The Main Event Mafia faced British Invasion in a four-way tag team match, which Magnus won. This caused Main Event Mafia leader, Kurt Angle, to reprimand the British Invasion who were supposed to aid the Mafia in winning, but Young calmed Angle. The two teams continued to show their allegiance by teaming at No Surrender in a Lethal Lockdown match, a cage match with staggered entry where a roof with weapons is lowered once all competitors are entered. However, Terry attacked Brother Ray before he entered, giving the team a temporary advantage until Beer Money pinned Williams. At Bound for Glory the British Invasion lost the IWGP Tag Team Titles back to Team 3D, but managed to win the TNA World Tag Team Titles in a four way Full Metal Mayhem Tag Team match against Booker T and Scott Steiner, Team 3D and Beer Money.

The British Invasion gave Beer Money, Inc. a rematch on the next episode of Impact! in a Six Sides of Steel match but successfully cheated their way out of the match by disqualifying themselves, meaning they lost the match but retained the titles. In a scripted speech the following week they revealed they were suspended without pay because of this but at Turning Point Magnus and Williams successfully defended the titles in a three-way match against Beer Money and The Motor City Machine Guns (Alex Shelley and Chris Sabin). The Machineguns were given another chance at the titles the following month and in the build up to this all three members of The British Invasion faced Sabin in a handicap match, which Sabin won against the odds when Williams and Magnus accidentally clotheslined Terry, who was then pinned. Despite this, at Final Resolution they were once again able to retain their titles. Also at the event was the annual Feast or Fired match, which saw five members of World Elite enter under the orders of Eric Young to prevent Beer Money winning a chance at the Tag Team Championship; despite his orders not to retrieve any of the four briefcases Rob Terry earned contention for the TNA X Division Championship. At Genesis the British Invasion lost the TNA World Tag Team Titles to Matt Morgan and Hernandez.

==== Dissolution (2010) ====
On 27 January 2010, Terry defeated Eric Young at a non-televised house show in Cardiff, Wales, to win the TNA Global Championship. On the following night's edition of Impact! the three teammates attacked Amazing Red, but as Terry went to cash in his Feast or Fired contract he was ordered by Magnus to hand it over to Williams, who then instead faced Red and quickly defeated him for the X Division Championship. Terry completed his face turn by attacking Magnus on 18 February edition of Impact!, after growing tired of his abuse. On 21 March at Destination X Brutus Magnus announced that from now on he would be known only by the name Magnus. That same night he failed in his attempt to win the Global Championship from his former teammate Rob Terry, while Williams retained his X Division Championship against Shannon Moore. After the event Magnus was taken off television, while Williams continued his singles career in the X Division, effectively ending the British Invasion.

==== Reformation and sporadic appearances (2011–2014) ====
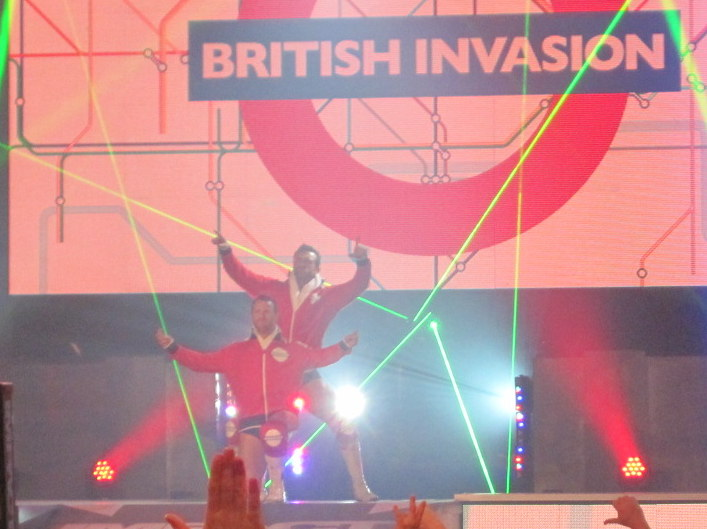
The British Invasion making their entrance at Slammiversary IX

On 30 December 2010, edition of Impact! Magnus and the now–face Williams teamed together for the first time in ten months, when they wrestled their former stable mate and now–heel Rob Terry and A.J. Styles in a losing effort. On 31 March 2011, edition of Impact!, Williams and Magnus officially reformed the British Invasion by attacking the team of Eric Young and Orlando Jordan, thus once again establishing themselves as a heel group. In their first match back together, Williams and Magnus were defeated by Ink Inc. (Jesse Neal and Shannon Moore) on 12 April edition of Xplosion. On 17 April at Lockdown, Williams and Magnus were defeated again by Ink Inc. in a four tag team number one contenders' steel cage match. Despite not having won a single match since their reformation, it was announced on 2 June edition of Impact Wrestling that the British Invasion would receive a shot at the TNA World Tag Team Championship at Slammiversary IX. At the pay-per-view, Williams and Magnus were unsuccessful in their challenge for the title, losing to the team of James Storm and Alex Shelley, who filled in for Robert Roode, who was sidelined with a storyline injury.

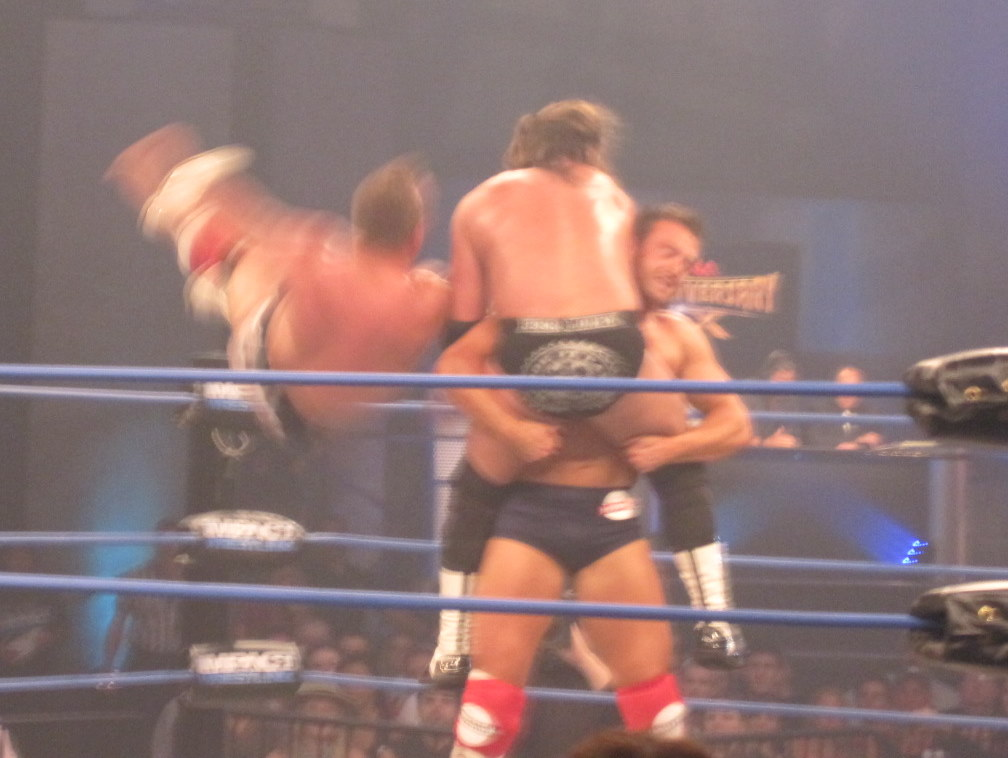
The British Invasion performing the bearhug / diving European uppercut combination on James Storm

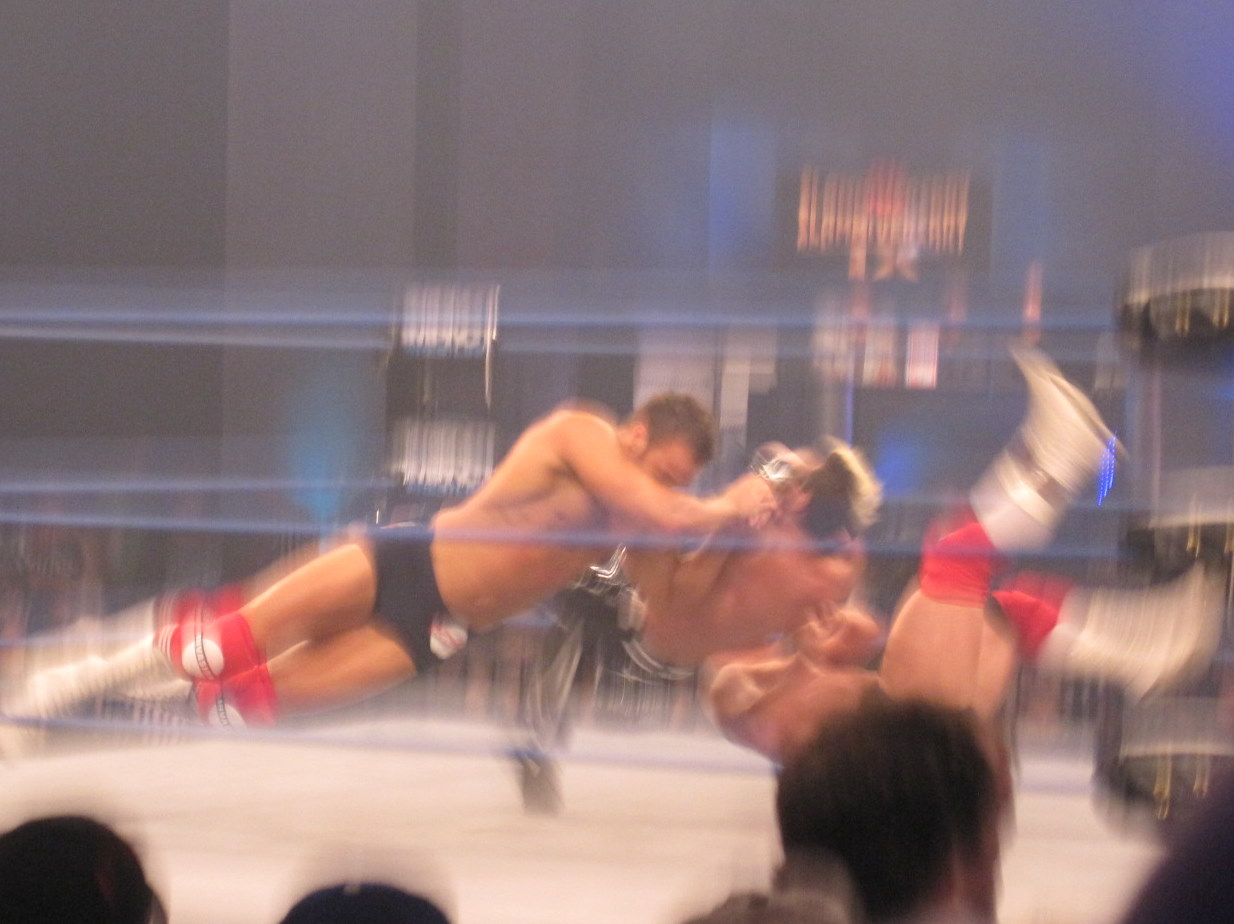
The British Invasion performing the double straight jacket neckbreaker on Alex Shelley

On 30 June edition of Impact Wrestling, Williams and Magnus turned face by responding to Mexican America's bad remarks by praising the United States. They were then attacked until Rob Terry, who had been recently exiled from Immortal, returned to save them, effectively adding him back to the group. On 14 July edition of Impact Wrestling, Mexican America's Anarquia and Hernandez defeated Williams and Magnus in a TNA World Tag Team Championship number one contender's match, following outside interference from their stablemate Rosita. After the grudge match, Terry's reunion with Magnus and Williams was abruptly forgotten as he no longer accompanied them to matches and eventually formed a new alliance with Robbie E. In December, Magnus went on to form a new tag team with Samoa Joe to rival tag team champions Crimson and Matt Morgan. On 2 February 2012, edition of Xplosion, it was announced that due to Magnus' alliance with Joe, the British Invasion had disbanded. On 18 March 2013, The British Invasion reunited to take part in the World Cup of Wrestling. Magnus and Williams also reunited on 2 February 2014 for the Joker's Wild II pay-per-view.

=== Global Force Wrestling (2015) ===
On 28 October 2015, The British Invasion reunited as part of Global Force Wrestling's GFW UK Invasion tour, Magnus wrestling under his real life name Nick Aldis teamed with Doug Williams defeating Marty Scurll and Rampage Brown.

=== National Wrestling Alliance (2021) ===
On 7 December 2021, The British Invasion reunited in NWA Powerrr, with Doug Williams debuting in National Wrestling Alliance teaming with Aldis defeating Hawx Aerie (PJ and Luke Hawx).

== Championships and accomplishments ==
- New Japan Pro-Wrestling
  - IWGP Tag Team Championship (1 time) – Magnus and Williams
- Total Nonstop Action Wrestling
  - TNA World Tag Team Championship (1 time) – Magnus and Williams
  - TNA Global Championship (1 time) – Terry
  - TNA X Division Championship (1 time) – Williams
  - Feast or Fired (2009 – X Division Championship contract) – Terry
  - Xplosion Championship Challenge (2011) – Magnus
