= TNA Lockdown (2011) =

2011 Total Nonstop Action Wrestling pay-per-view event

Lockdown (2011)
- Promotional Poster featuring Mr. Anderson
- Promotion: Total Nonstop Action Wrestling (TNA)
- Date: April 17, 2011
- City: Cincinnati, Ohio
- Venue: U.S. Bank Arena
- Attendance: 4,000
- Tagline: It's My Time

Pay-per-view chronology
← Previous; Victory Road	Next → Sacrifice

Lockdown chronology
← Previous; 2010	Next → 2012

The 2011 Lockdown was a professional wrestling pay-per-view (PPV) event produced by the Total Nonstop Action Wrestling (TNA) promotion, that took place on April 17, 2011 at the U.S. Bank Arena in Cincinnati, Ohio. It was the seventh event under the Lockdown chronology and the fourth event of the 2011 TNA PPV schedule. In the concept of Lockdown events, every match was booked to take place inside a steel cage.

The event featured double main events in which Sting defeated Rob Van Dam and Mr. Anderson in a steel cage match to retain the TNA World Heavyweight Championship, and Fortune (James Storm, Robert Roode, Kazarian and Christopher Daniels) defeated Immortal (Ric Flair, Abyss, Bully Ray and Matt Hardy) in a Lethal Lockdown match. In the other match at the top of the card Jeff Jarrett defeated Kurt Angle in an "Ultra Male Rules" Two out of Three Falls Steel Cage match.

In October 2017, with the launch of the Global Wrestling Network, the event became available to stream on demand.

== Production ==
Other on-screen personnel
Commentator	Mike Tenay
Commentator	Taz
Ring announcer	Jeremy Borash
Referee	Earl Hebner
Referee	Brian Hebner
Referee	Jackson James
Interviewers	Jeremy Borash
Interviewers	Christy Hemme

=== Background ===
The seventh installment to the Lockdown PPV chronology was first announced in a press release on February 10, 2011, with the event being determined to emanate from the US Bank Arena in Cincinnati, Ohio. A tradition of the series is that all encounters take place inside a steel cage which will be continued.

TNA arranged a weekend of festivities as part of the "TNA Lockdown VIP Weekend" featuring interaction with the TNA Superstars and Staff as well as appearances from wrestling legends Ric Flair, Hulk Hogan, Sting and Mick Foley. As part of the package, fans got the opportunity to board a RiverBoat Cruise and receive VIP entrance to Lockdown.

=== Storylines ===
Lockdown featured eight professional wrestling matches and one pre-show match that involved different wrestlers from pre-existing scripted feuds and storylines. Wrestlers portrayed villains, heroes, or less distinguishable characters in the scripted events that built tension and culminated in a wrestling match or series of matches.

The predominant feud entering Lockdown was between Mr. Anderson, Rob Van Dam, and TNA World Heavyweight Champion, Sting competing for the title. On the March 17 edition of TNA Impact!, Anderson demanded a rematch for contention to the world title, after wrestling to a double count-out with Van Dam at Victory Road, leaving no prevalent contender. Partially granted by “TNA owner” Hulk Hogan and partner Eric Bischoff, who booked a four-way involving Anderson and Van Dam, the match, however, ended in a double pinfall causing the same result. The following week, Sting entered the picture when he was selected by “The Network” to be the Special Enforcer (ringside referee) of the rematch between Anderson and Van Dam for title contention that night, but this led to a feud where Anderson accused Sting for disqualifying him for his actions that rendered the official referee unconscious, which made Van Dam the contender to the TNA World Heavyweight Championship. On the March 31 edition of TNA Impact!, Anderson vented his frustration on referee Earl Hebner, who had actually disqualified him for an inadvertent clothesline attack. Bischoff and Hogan then added Anderson to the world title match at Lockdown, making it a three-way match. The conflict between Van Dam, Anderson, and Sting deepened over the weeks, with Immortal trying unsuccessfully to recruit Anderson and Van Dam to their group. After Immortal plotted to get back at Anderson for swerving them, Sting helped Anderson out of the situation with his signature baseball bat.

In a major feud featured, Fortune had aligned themselves with Immortal, a group who were culprits behind the year-long mystery of "They" and their arrival on "10.10.10", in October 2010. After conning TNA President Dixie Carter to take over her company, Immortal was prepared to conquer and rule TNA, but Carter slapped Hogan with a court order. In January 2011, Immortal's tactics were used against them when threats from an entity named "They" surfaced and Crimson, the messenger, sidelined Abyss with an attack using his own 2x4-with-nails weapon named "Janice" (a name that was a pun on Dixie Carter's mother, Janice). On the February 3 edition of TNA Impact!, Fortune turned on Immortal without the knowledge of their manager, Ric Flair, revealing themselves as “They”, claiming they would no longer take a backseat to Immortal. On the February 17 edition of TNA Impact!, Flair tried to call a truce but eventually abandoned Fortune to join Immortal by turning on Fortune member A.J. Styles during his match with Immortal member Matt Hardy. Two weeks later, Hulk Hogan returned from absence to boast about his court battle victory for ownership of TNA, and along with his partner Eric Bischoff, conceded to manipulating Carter for the advantage, leaving Carter to only "provide the money" from there on out. Fortune, however, stood up for Carter, thanking her for giving them jobs and an opportunity in the company. The battle between both groups heated up in March when new Immortal member Bully Ray powerbombed Fortune member AJ Styles off the stage, sidelining him with a storyline injury, and later in the month, Christopher Daniels returned to the company to help Fortune fend off Immortal and their returning member, Abyss. On the April 7 edition of TNA Impact!, Daniels asked Hulk Hogan if he could be Fortune's fourth member for the Lethal Lockdown match against Immortal, which Hogan agreed to. The following week, Fortune and Immortal had a Best of 3 Series of matches to determine who would get the man advantage in Lethal Lockdown. In the first match, Immortal's Matt Hardy defeated Fortune's Kazarian, and Immortal's Abyss defeated Fortune's James Storm. This meant that Immortal would have the man advantage during their Lethal Lockdown match.

Another feud heading into Lockdown was the ongoing rivalry between Kurt Angle and Jeff Jarrett. At Against All Odds, Jeff Jarrett defeated Kurt Angle. Per the stipulation, Kurt Angle had to give his ex-wife Karen Jarrett away to his rival Jeff Jarrett at the wedding renewal of the Jarretts. On the February 24 edition of TNA Impact!, the Jarretts distracted Angle, costing him his match with Rob Van Dam and Mr. Anderson. The following week, Angle ruined the Jarretts wedding renewal ceremony by beating down Jeff and driving Karen's face into her wedding cake. Infuriated, the Jarretts redid the ceremony the same night. Angle cooperated this time despite insults being hurled at him from Karen until the ceremony concluded and he scared them off with an axe. On the March 17 edition of TNA Impact!, Angle presented a gift to Jeff and declared he was the better man as husband and father to Karen and Angle's kids that were under custody of Karen. Not sincerely meaning a word, Angle retrieved the guitar gift he gave to Jeff and blasted him over the head with it. Fed up with the Jarretts, Angle challenged Jeff to a match at Lockdown, which Jeff frantically accepted. Jeff appeared in a steel cage on the April 7 edition of TNA Impact to speak about his unavailing efforts to get a restraining order against Angle. Shortly after, Angle used a zip line to enter the ring and attack Jeff, who fled the scene altogether. A week later, it was announced that the match at Lockdown would be contested under "Ultra Male" rules. The first fall had to be won by submission, the second by pinfall, and the third fall had to be won by escaping the cage.

Another ongoing rivalry that was featured at Lockdown was the defending TNA Women's Knockout Champion Madison Rayne, who went up against Mickie James for the title. On the March 17 edition of TNA Impact!, following Rayne defeating Alissa Flash, James made the save during a post-match assault. Anxious to confront Rayne again for the Knockouts Title after past, unsuccessful attempts to capture the belt, Rayne gave her one last shot and pitched the terms that if James lost, she would have to get her hair shaved, to which James agreed to for Lockdown. On the April 7 edition of TNA Impact!, Tara, who served as Rayne's bodyguard, opposed Rayne's vicious idea of taking out their rival, but Rayne made Tara run over James with a motorcycle in the parking lot of the Impact Zone. The next week, Rayne claimed Tara should have backed up and ran James over again. Upset, Tara told Rayne that she was taking matters too far. James soon came out to the ring promising revenge against Rayne for the past six months she had been out-rivaled.

== Results ==
No.	Results	Stipulations	Times
1^{P}	Brother Devon defeated Anarquia	Steel Cage match	02:30
2	Max Buck defeated Amazing Red, Brian Kendrick, Chris Sabin, Jay Lethal, Jeremy Buck, Robbie E (with Cookie) and Suicide	Xscape match to determine the #1 contender for the TNA X Division Championship at Sacrifice	13:33
3	Ink Inc. (Jesse Neal and Shannon Moore) defeated The British Invasion (Douglas Williams and Magnus), Crimson and Scott Steiner and Eric Young and Orlando Jordan	Steel Cage match	08:51
4	Mickie James defeated Madison Rayne (c)	Steel Cage Title vs. Hair match for the TNA Women's Knockout Championship	00:36
5	Samoa Joe defeated D'Angelo Dinero by submission	Steel Cage match	10:25
6	Matt Morgan defeated Hernandez (with Anarquia, Rosita and Sarita)	Steel Cage match	08:13
7	Jeff Jarrett (with Karen Jarrett) defeated Kurt Angle	"Ultra Male Rules" Two out of Three Falls Steel Cage match: Fall one: Submissions only; Fall two: Pinfalls only; Fall three: Escape the cage	22:37
8	Sting (c) defeated Mr. Anderson and Rob Van Dam	Steel Cage match for the TNA World Heavyweight Championship	08:55
9	Fortune (Christopher Daniels, James Storm, Kazarian and Robert Roode) defeated Immortal (Abyss, Bully Ray, Matt Hardy and Ric Flair)	Lethal Lockdown match	22:52
(c) / – the champion(s) heading into the match; P / – the match was broadcast on the pre-show

=== Xscape match ===
Elimination No.	Eliminated	Eliminator	Notes	Time
1	Suicide	Robbie E	Pinned after an Inverted stomp facebreaker	2:04
2	Jay Lethal	Amazing Red	Pinned after a Code Red	4:59
3	Amazing Red	Chris Sabin	Pinned after a Lariat	5:06
4	Chris Sabin	Max Buck	Pinned after a Cutter	6:36
5	Jeremy Buck	Max Buck	Pinned by a Small package	9:12
6	Robbie E	Brian Kendrick	Pinned after an Enzuigiri and a dropkick to the head	11:44
Loser	Brian Kendrick	N/A	Kendrick failed to escape the cage before M. Buck	13:33
WINNER	Max Buck	N/A	M. Buck escaped the cage before Kendrick to win the match	13:33
