= Anarquia =

American professional wrestler (born 1980)

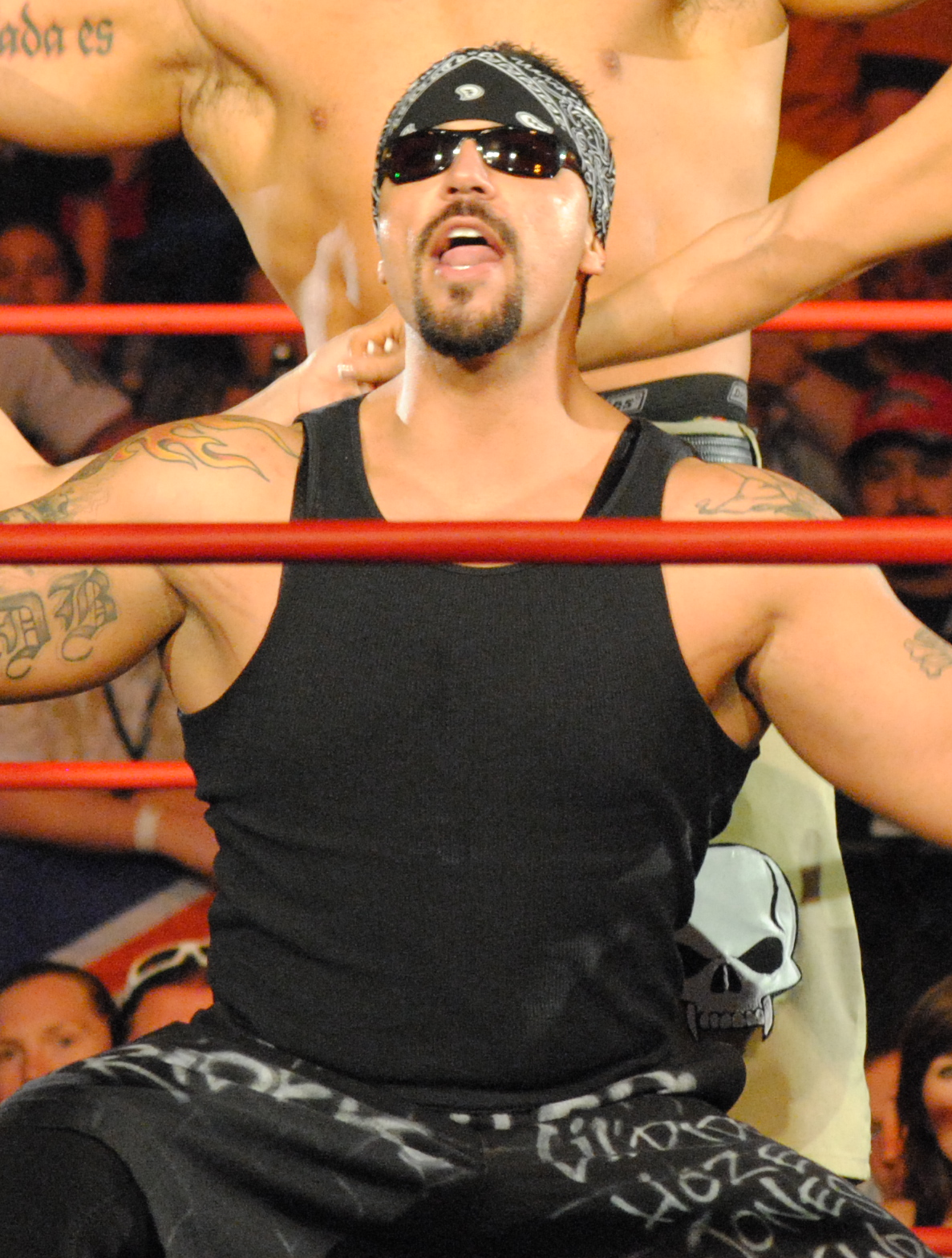
- Anarquia in March 2011

Personal information
- Born: Matt Barela; January 1980 (age 46) Santa Rosa, New Mexico, U.S.

Professional wrestling career
- Ring name(s): Anarquia; Low Rider; Matt Barela; Ramón; Ramón Loco
- Billed height: 6 ft 0 in (183 cm)
- Billed weight: 230 lb (104 kg)
- Billed from: Los Angeles, California, U.S. Mexico City, Mexico (TNA); Santa Rosa, New Mexico, U.S. (OVW)
- Trained by: Ohio Valley Wrestling
- Debut: 1999
- Retired: 2015

Matt Barela (born January 1980) is an American retired professional wrestler. He is best known for working for Total Nonstop Action Wrestling (TNA), where, under the ring name Anarquia, he was a member of the Mexican America stable.

== Professional wrestling career ==
=== Early career (1999–2011) ===
Barela debuted in 1999.

In 2004, Barela joined Ohio Valley Wrestling as "Ramón". He teamed with Raúl Loco as "Los Locos". The team won the OVW Southern Tag Team Championship twice, but eventually split, after which Barela adopted the new ring name Low Rider. As Low Rider, Barela portrayed a hot headed crowd favorite who would mix his interviews with bits of Spanish. Barela eventually worked to main event status, winning the OVW Heavyweight Championship twice through victories over Apoc and James "Moose" Thomas.

=== Total Nonstop Action Wrestling (2011–2012) ===
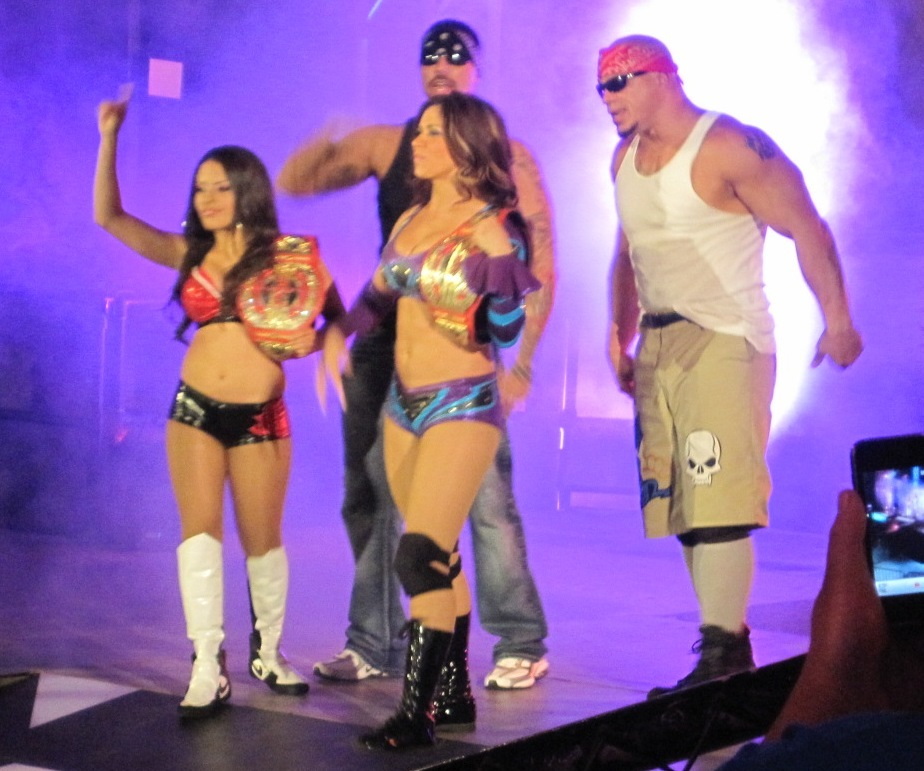
Mexican America making their entrance in June 2011

Barela made his debut for Total Nonstop Action Wrestling (TNA) on March 13, 2011, at the Victory Road pay-per-view, where he appeared as a planted fan and interfered in a First Blood match between Hernandez and Matt Morgan, helping Hernandez pick up the win. On the following edition of Impact!, the alliance of Hernandez, Sarita and Rosita, known collectively as Mexican America, faced Morgan, Angelina Love and Winter in a six-person street fight, after which Barela once again entered the ring and attacked Morgan. On the March 24 edition of Impact!, Barela was officially presented as the newest member of the anti-American group and was given the ring name Anarquia. On the July 14 edition of Impact Wrestling, Anarquia and Hernandez defeated The British Invasion (Douglas Williams and Magnus), with help from Rosita, to become the number one contenders to the TNA World Tag Team Championship. They would receive their shot at the TNA World Tag Team Championship on August 7 at Hardcore Justice, but were defeated by the defending champions, Beer Money, Inc. (Bobby Roode and James Storm). Two days later, at the tapings of the August 18 edition of Impact Wrestling, Anarquia and Hernandez defeated Beer Money, Inc. in a rematch, following interference from the "Mexican Heavyweight Champion" Jeff Jarrett, to win the TNA World Tag Team Championship. On September 11 at No Surrender, Anarquia and Hernandez successfully defended the title against D'Angelo Dinero and Devon, following interference from Rosita and Sarita. Later that month, Mexican America began feuding with Ink Inc. (Jesse Neal and Shannon Moore), stemming from their match at Sacrifice in May, where Hernandez had legitimately injured Neal. On October 16, during the Bound for Glory Preshow, Mexican America successfully defended the TNA World Tag Team Championship against Ink Inc. The following month at Turning Point, Anarquia, Hernandez and Sarita defeated Ink Inc.'s Jesse Neal, Shannon Moore and Toxxin in a six-person tag team match to retain the TNA World Tag Team Championship. On the following edition of Impact Wrestling, Anarquia and Hernandez lost the TNA World Tag Team Championship to Crimson and Matt Morgan. On the following edition of Impact Wrestling, Hernandez and Arnaquia failed to regain the title in a rematch. On December 6, it was reported that TNA had sent Barela back to Ohio Valley Wrestling, which had recently become the promotion's new developmental territory. After spending three months off television, Anarquia returned on the March 22, 2012, edition of Impact Wrestling, when he and Hernandez unsuccessfully challenged Magnus and Samoa Joe for the TNA World Tag Team Championship. Anarquia's last appearance was on the April 26 episode of Impact Wrestling, losing to Kurt Angle via submission. The following day, Barela's profile was removed from TNA's official website. His departure from the promotion was confirmed four days later.

=== Late career (2012–2015) ===
Barela retired in 2015.

== Acting career ==
Barela appeared in the comedy/action film Overtime alongside OVW trainer Al Snow and fellow OVW wrestlers Rudy Switchblade and Ted McNaler. He was also in the movie Sicario, Starring Josh Brolin and Benicio Del Toro

== Championships and accomplishments ==
- Ohio Valley Wrestling
  - OVW Heavyweight Championship (2 times)
  - OVW Southern Tag Team Championship (2 times) – with Raúl Loco/LaMotta
- Pro Wrestling Illustrated
  - PWI ranked him #167 of the top 500 singles wrestlers in the PWI 500 in 2011
- Total Nonstop Action Wrestling
  - TNA World Tag Team Championship (1 time) – with Hernandez
