= Victory Road (2011) =

2011 Total Nonstop Action Wrestling pay-per-view event

- Promotional Poster featuring Kurt Angle (who neither competed on the card nor appeared at the event).
- Promotion: Total Nonstop Action Wrestling (TNA)
- Date: March 13, 2011
- City: Orlando, Florida
- Venue: Impact Zone
- Attendance: 1,100
- Tagline: Victory is reserved for those who are willing to pay the price.

Pay-per-view chronology
← Previous; Against All Odds	Next → Lockdown

Victory Road chronology
← Previous; 2010	Next → 2012

The 2011 Victory Road was a professional wrestling pay-per-view event produced by Total Nonstop Action Wrestling (TNA) promotion, which took place on March 13, 2011 at the Impact Zone in Orlando, Florida. It was the seventh event under the Victory Road chronology and the third event of the 2011 TNA PPV schedule. In October 2017, with the launch of the Global Wrestling Network, the event became available to stream on demand.

The infamous main event between TNA World Heavyweight Champion Sting and challenger Jeff Hardy was impacted by Hardy arriving intoxicated and being unable to perform. The other matches on the card were poor and the event as a whole was viewed by critics as one of the worst pay-per-view events in the history of professional wrestling.

== Storylines ==
Other on-screen personnel
Commentator	Mike Tenay
Commentator	Taz
Ring announcer	Jeremy Borash
Referee	Rudy Charles
Referee	Mark "Slick" Johnson
Referee	Andrew Thomas
Referee	Brian Hebner
Interviewers	Jeremy Borash

Victory Road featured eight professional wrestling matches that involved different wrestlers from pre-existing scripted feuds and storylines. Wrestlers portrayed villains, heroes, or less distinguishable characters in the scripted events that built tension and culminated in a wrestling match or series of matches.

The primary storyline which was featured at Victory Road was between defending champion Sting and challenger Jeff Hardy for the TNA World Heavyweight Championship. On the March 3 edition of TNA Impact!, a show slated to shed light on a cryptic "3.3.11" promo shown a week prior, Sting, brought back by "The Network", made a surprise return coming off months of absence after failing to persuade Dixie Carter about the Immortal takeover, to challenge and win the title from Hardy, who was one of the frontrunners of the group. The following week, Hardy claimed he was robbed because he was deprived of time to prepare for his title defense. Moments after, "TNA owner" and Immortal members Hulk Hogan and his partner Eric Bischoff announced that it would be Sting against Hardy at Victory Road with the championship on the line.

Another storyline that entered into Victory Road was between Mr. Anderson and Rob Van Dam over contention to the TNA World Heavyweight Championship. At Against All Odds, Jeff Hardy defeated Anderson in a Ladder match. On the February 17 edition of TNA Impact!, Anderson protested Van Dam receiving a title shot that night over his rematch clause entitlement, but Bischoff told him that "The Network" wants ratings, and don't favor him due to his lack of family friendly nature, but made Anderson Special Referee of the match on terms of calling it impartially. In compliance with the deal, after the match which Hardy won, Anderson laid out Hardy and Van Dam with a Mic Check. The next week, Anderson, hellbent on obtaining his rematch, was confronted by Van Dam after the attack in the past week leading to retribution on his part and Bischoff making a contender's match between Kurt Angle, Van Dam and Anderson which Anderson won. On the March 3 edition of TNA Impact!, Anderson sought to cash in on his contention that night, but Sting returned and was selected to face Hardy for the title, which he won. The following week, Hardy, upset for being unprepared to face the returning likes of Sting in a world title defense, told Anderson that he had to wait in line. Van Dam also inserted that he was stripped of the title months ago, and felt screwed when Anderson officiated his match with Hardy for the championship. It was eventually announced that Anderson would take on Van Dam at Victory Road for a shot at the title.

A feud that went into Victory Road was between A.J. Styles, Matt Hardy and Ric Flair. On the February 17 edition of TNA Impact!, Flair betrayed Styles during his one on one contest with Hardy. Later in the night, Styles, angry, challenged Flair the next week to a match. The following week, before their match only amounted to a brawl, Flair, now with Immortal, dropped his Fortune leadership to Styles, disrespecting him vocally and physically in the process, igniting full-on retaliation. On the March 10 edition of TNA Impact!, Flair, Hardy and Styles faced off in a three-way Street Fight, which conspicuously turned into a Handicap match, where after a low blow and Twist of Hate, Hardy allowed Flair to gain the pinfall victory over Styles. Later, it was announced that Hardy, with Flair in his corner, would wrestle Styles at Victory Road.

A feud in the X-Division carried into Victory Road was between defending champion Kazarian, Robbie E, Jeremy Buck, and Max Buck over the TNA X Division Championship. On the February 17 edition of TNA Impact!, former champion Robbie E declared his intentions to reclaim the title, but Kazarian assured that he would resurge the X-Division that TNA was built upon. That night, Kazarian fought Robbie E for the title and picked up a disqualification win due to Cookie's interference, prompting Traci Brooks to make the save. On the March 10 edition of TNA Impact!, Generation Me lost their match to Ink Inc, putting a wedge in their partnership. They were later added to the X Division Title match at Victory Road.

On the February 24 edition of TNA Impact!, Matt Morgan and Hernandez continued their feud once Morgan quickly jumped on the assault of Immortal member Hernandez during his assistance to Ric Flair in a physical confrontation with A.J. Styles, attacking him all over the arena. On the show the week following, Morgan, much bloodied after the encounter, prevailed over Hernandez in a one on one match. It was later announced that Hernandez and Morgan were scheduled to compete in a First Blood match at Victory Road.

On the March 10 edition of TNA Impact!, it was announced that Ink Inc. would battle Beer Money, Inc. at Victory Road for the TNA World Tag Team Championship. On the night, they defeated Generation Me and told Beer Money, who were on commentary, that the Book of DILLIGAF said they were going to become the champions. James Storm said on behalf of Beer Money that "they're sorry about their damn luck".

== Jeff Hardy incident ==
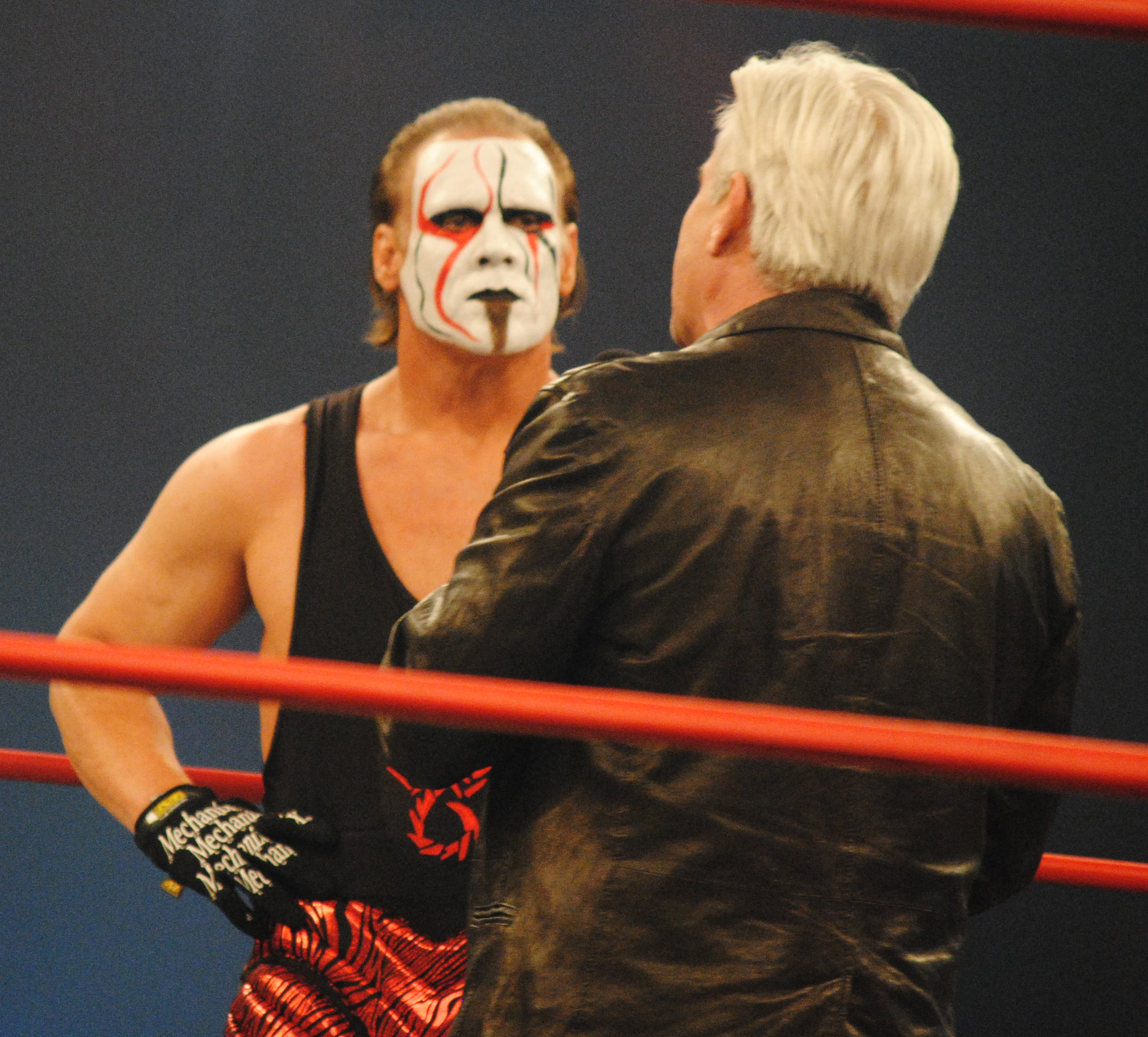
During an improvised segment, Eric Bischoff instructed Sting to end the match immediately after it started

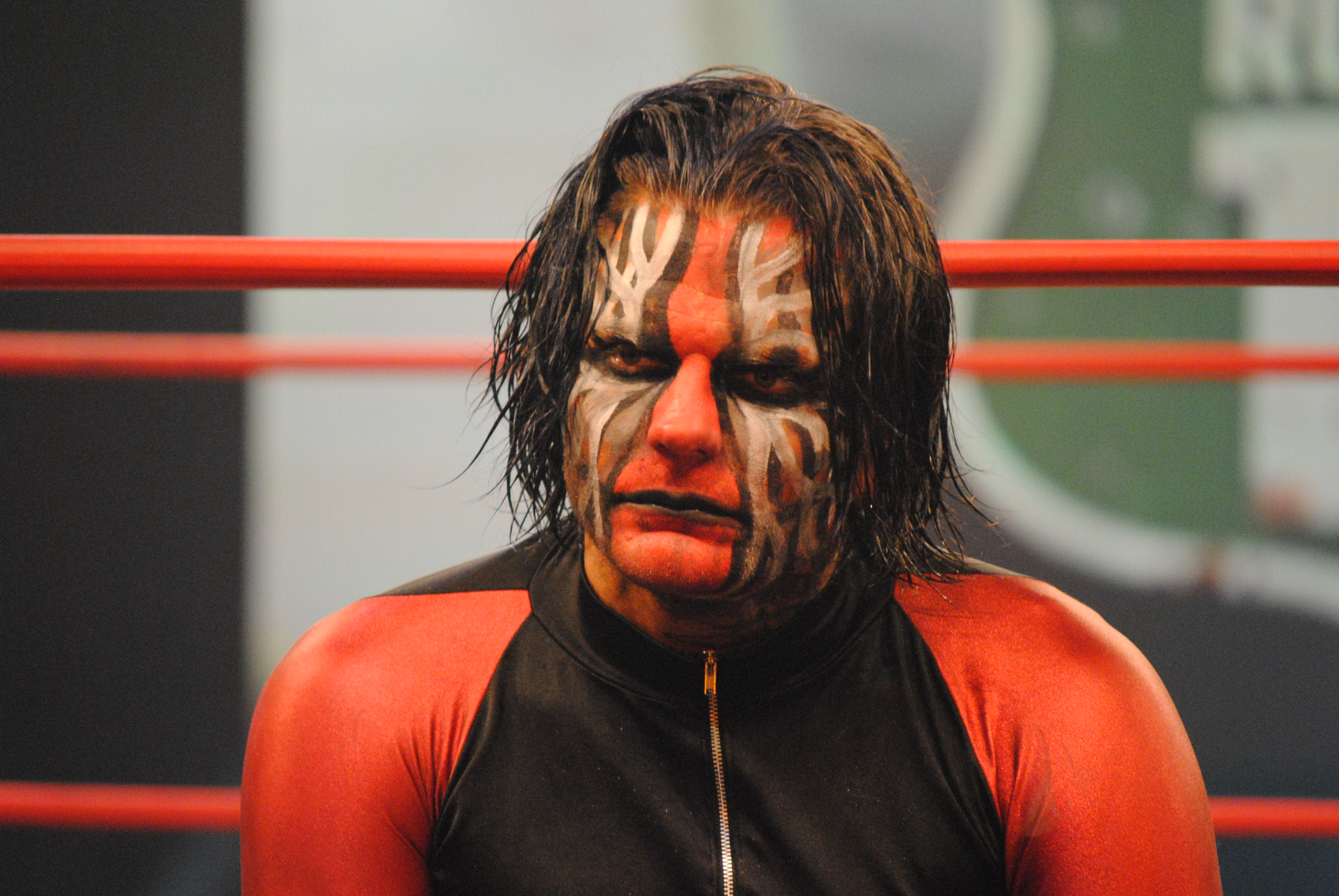
Jeff Hardy was not in a suitable condition to perform

According to reports, the main event featuring then TNA World Heavyweight Champion Sting defeating Jeff Hardy by pinfall to retain the title in 1 minute and 28 seconds, was cut short due to backstage concern over Jeff Hardy's well-being.

After Hardy's entrance music played, it took over 40 seconds before he emerged, clearly intoxicated and under the influence of drugs, then stumbled out and staggered his way into the ring, forcing referee Brian Hebner to give an "X" sign during Sting's entrance to the ring. Following an audible from Eric Bischoff, and Hardy spending over a minute teasing the crowd over whether or not he would throw his shirt, Sting hit Hardy with his Scorpion Death Drop and forcefully shoot pinned him to end the match in 88 seconds. Upon exiting the ring, a visibly angry Sting responded to chants from fans who were outraged at the length of the match and at Hardy's condition, as it was clear he was unfit to wrestle. Many fans chanted "that was bullshit", and as Sting was walking up the ramp, he turned to them and said "I agree! I agree!" TNA later apologized to its fans for the pay-per-view "falling short of their standard" and offered six months of free access to the TNAondemand.com library to anyone who bought the event.

As a result of the fiasco that unfolded at Victory Road, Hardy was sent home from Impact! tapings the following week, and subsequently written out of the next month of TNA programming. It was later reported that while Hardy was considered fine throughout the day, it was only moments before his match that he was deemed unable to compete. Hardy had been abusing drugs and alcohol, and completed a 120-day rehab during his time away from TNA. On the September 8 edition of Impact Wrestling, Hardy made his return to TNA, and acknowledged that he had "hit rock bottom at Victory Road", and was on the road to recovery, before asking the fans for "one more shot". Hardy made his return to TNA full-time by the end of September 2011.

In 2021, Bischoff told Conrad Thompson on his weekly 83 Weeks podcast that contrary to previous reports, Hardy showed up at the mandatory talent call-time of 11:00 a.m. before disappearing for hours, during which time he was presumably drinking and using drugs. He was not seen again until moments before his match, with Bischoff waiting in the gorilla position to confront Hardy about his absenteeism: at that moment, everyone discovered Hardy's condition. As Dixie Carter was not in gorilla at the time, nor was anyone else in power, Bischoff took it upon himself to call an audible and told both participants (while trying to cut an impromptu promo) to end the match with Sting winning as quick as possible. Bischoff also added that had Hardy been discovered 45 minutes sooner, TNA would have likely been able to find a replacement and inform all of the affected parties in time. However, as most talent had already been out of their ring gear and showered by the time of the main event (or, in some cases, had left the arena altogether), the crew in gorilla was left with no choice but to let Hardy compete and to end the match as quickly as possible.

== Reception ==
The event was heavily panned by critics, and was seen as one of the worst major professional wrestling events in recent history. Canadian Online Explorer writer Bob Kapur scored the show 5 out of 10. He scored the Matt Hardy versus AJ Styles match 8 out of 10 and the Ultimate X Championship match 7 out of 10. Kapur was overall critical when stating, "TNA ended the night off on two really low notes, in the form of a number one contender's match that had no winner, followed by a main event world championship match that ended in a minute". The Wrestling Observer Newsletter listed Victory Road as the worst major wrestling show of 2011. Colleagues Bryan Alvarez and Vince Verhei were particularly critical of the finish to the Knockouts Tag Team Championship match, with Alvarez having given the overall match minus three stars. Their two main points of criticism were the delay in Velvet Sky getting to the ring to intercept Rosita and the unbelievability that Rosita could keep the much larger Winter pinned for as long as she did. They also criticized the finish of the Hernandez/Morgan match, which Hernandez won by spraying fake blood onto Morgan's chest despite bleeding first (and being caught blading by the cameraman), and the RVD/Anderson match due to Anderson's inability to perform two basic moves as well as his choosing to perform a Mic Check on the entrance ramp to get himself counted out along with RVD, with the crowd reacting to the finish with half yelling "restart the match" and the other half simply yelling "No!" Finally, Alvarez gave the Hardy/Sting match a minus five star rating to close the show.

== Results ==
No.	Results	Stipulations	Times
1	Tommy Dreamer defeated Bully Ray	Falls Count Anywhere match	10:45
2	Rosita and Sarita defeated Angelina Love and Winter (c)	Tag team match for the TNA Knockouts Tag Team Championship	04:58
3	Hernandez defeated Matt Morgan	First Blood match	08:35
4	Kazarian (c) defeated Jeremy Buck, Max Buck, and Robbie E (with Cookie)	Ultimate X match for the TNA X Division Championship	14:22
5	Beer Money, Inc. (James Storm and Robert Roode) (c) defeated Ink Inc. (Jesse Neal and Shannon Moore)	Tag team match for the TNA World Tag Team Championship	12:30
6	A.J. Styles defeated Matt Hardy (with Ric Flair)	Singles match	17:38
7	Mr. Anderson vs. Rob Van Dam ended in a double countout	Singles match	12:54
8	Sting (c) defeated Jeff Hardy	No Disqualification match for the TNA World Heavyweight Championship	01:28
(c) / – the champion(s) heading into the match
