= 2011 in professional wrestling =

2011 in professional wrestling describes the year's events in the world of professional wrestling.

== List of notable promotions ==
These promotions held notable events in 2011.

Promotion Name	Abbreviation	Notes
Consejo Mundial de Lucha Libre	CMLL	
Juggalo Championship Wrestling	JCW	
LN Promotions	LN	
Lucha Libre AAA Worldwide	AAA	The "AAA" abbreviation has been used since the mid-1990s and had previously stood for the promotion's original name Asistencia Asesoría y Administración.
New Japan Pro-Wrestling	NJPW	
Pro Wrestling Guerrilla	PWG	
Ring of Honor	ROH	
Total Nonstop Action Wrestling	TNA	
World Wrestling Council	WWC	
World Wrestling Entertainment	WWE	In April, the promotion ceased going by its full name and began to solely refer to itself as WWE, becoming an orphaned initialism, though the full name is still the legal name for the company. WWE divided its roster into two storyline divisions, Raw and SmackDown, referred to as brands, where wrestlers exclusively performed on their respective weekly television programs until August, when the brand split ended.

== Calendar of notable shows ==
=== January ===
Date	Promotion(s)	Event	Location	Main event	Notes
4	NJPW	Wrestle Kingdom V	Tokyo	Hiroshi Tanahashi defeated Satoshi Kojima (c) in a Singles match to win the IWGP Heavyweight Championship	
7/8/9	WWC	Euphoria	San Juan, Puerto Rico	Various	
9	TNA	Genesis	Orlando	Mr. Anderson defeated Jeff Hardy (c) in a Singles match to win the TNA World Heavyweight Championship	This event was Matt Hardy's debut in TNA
30	WWE: Raw; SmackDown	Royal Rumble	Boston	Alberto Del Rio won the 40-man Royal Rumble match by last eliminating Santino Marella to earn a world championship match at WrestleMania XXVII	Alberto Del Rio chose to challenge for the World Heavyweight Championship. Largest Royal Rumble match, which traditionally has 30 participants, until the 50-man Greatest Royal Rumble match in 2018.
(c) – denotes defending champion(s)

=== February ===
Date	Promotion(s)	Event	Location	Main event
12	LN	A Nightmare To Remember	Villa Rica, Georgia	Original Bad Company (Steve Lawler and John Michaels) defeated Joel Deaton and Mr. Atlanta in a Villa Rica Street Fight
13	TNA	Against All Odds	Orlando	Jeff Hardy defeated Mr. Anderson (c) in a Ladder match to win the TNA World Heavyweight Championship
15 & 20	NJPW	The New Beginning	Tokyo (Day 1); Sendai (Day 2)	15 Feb: Hiroshi Tanahashi and Prince Devitt defeated Kojima-gun (Satoshi Kojima and Taka Michinoku) in a Tag team match 20 Feb: Hiroshi Tanahashi (c) defeated Satoshi Kojima in a Singles match to retain the IWGP Heavyweight Championship
20	WWE: Raw; SmackDown	Elimination Chamber	Oakland	John Cena defeated CM Punk, John Morrison, Sheamus, Randy Orton, and R-Truth in an Elimination Chamber match for a WWE Championship match at WrestleMania XXVII
26	ROH	ROH 9th Anniversary Show	Chicago	Wrestling's Greatest Tag Team (Charlie Haas and Shelton Benjamin) defeated The Briscoe Brothers (Jay Briscoe and Mark Briscoe) for a future match for the ROH World Tag Team Championship
(c) – denotes defending champion(s)

=== March ===
Date	Promotion(s)	Event	Location	Main event
13	TNA	Victory Road	Orlando	Sting (c) defeated Jeff Hardy in a No Disqualification match to retain the TNA World Heavyweight Championship
18	AAA	Rey de Reyes	Aguascalientes, Aguascalientes, Mexico	2011 Rey de Reyes final four-way elimination match
26	JCW	Hatchet Attacks	Milwaukee, Wisconsin	Corporal Robinson (c) defeated Ian Rotten in a Barbed wire, Tables, Ladders, and Glass match for the JCW World Heavyweight Championship
(c) – denotes defending champion(s)

=== April ===
Date	Promotion(s)	Event	Location	Main event	Notes
1–2	ROH	Honor Takes Center Stage	Atlanta	1 Apr Eddie Edwards (c) defeated Christopher Daniels in a Singles match to retain the ROH World Championship; 2 Apr Wrestling's Greatest Tag Team (Charlie Haas and Shelton Benjamin) defeated The American Wolves (Davey Richards and Eddie Edwards)	
3	WWE: Raw; SmackDown	WrestleMania XXVII	Atlanta	The Miz (c) defeated John Cena in a Singles match to retain the WWE Championship	This was Edge's last PPV match in his wrestling career until January 2020
17	TNA	Lockdown	Cincinnati	Fortune (Christopher Daniels, Kazarian, Robert Roode and James Storm) defeated Immortal (Ric Flair, Abyss, Bully Ray and Matt Hardy) in Lethal Lockdown match	
29	CMLL	55. Aniversario de Arena México	Mexico City, Mexico	La Máscara, La Sombra and Rush defeated La Peste Negra (Mr. Niebla and Negro Casas) and Averno	
(c) – denotes defending champion(s)

=== May ===
Date	Promotion(s)	Event	Location	Main event	Notes
1	WWE: Raw; SmackDown	Extreme Rules	Tampa	John Cena defeated The Miz (c) and John Morrison in a Triple threat steel cage match to win the WWE Championship	This event was Michelle McCool's last PPV match in her wrestling career and Kharma's debut in WWE
3	NJPW	Wrestling Dontaku	Fukuoka	Hiroshi Tanahashi (c) defeated Shinsuke Nakamura in a Singles match to retain the IWGP Heavyweight Championship	
4	JCW	St. Andrews Brawl	Detroit, Michigan	2 Tuff Tony and Rhino vs. Rob Conway and Sabu ended in a no contest	
15	TNA	Sacrifice	Orlando	Sting (c) defeated Rob Van Dam in a Singles match to retain the TNA World Heavyweight Championship	The event was notable for the return of Chyna to in-ring competition for the first time since 2002; however, it would ultimately be her last match.
22	WWE: Raw; SmackDown	Over the Limit	Seattle	John Cena (c) defeated The Miz in an "I Quit" match to retain the WWE Championship	
(c) – denotes defending champion(s)

=== June ===
Date	Promotion(s)	Event	Location	Main event
12	TNA	Slammiversary	Orlando	Kurt Angle defeated Jeff Jarrett in a Singles Match to determine the number one contender for the TNA World Heavyweight Championship; If Jarrett won, Angle would have had to give Jarrett his Olympic Gold Medal.
17	CMLL	Juicio Final	Mexico City	La Máscara defeated Averno in a Best two-out-of-three falls Lucha de Apuestas, Mask vs. Mask match
18	AAA	Triplemanía XIX	Mexico City, Mexico	Dr. Wagner Jr. defeated Rob Van Dam in a Singles match for the inaugural AAA Latin American Championship
18	NJPW	Dominion	Osaka	Hiroshi Tanahashi (c) defeated Hirooki Goto in a Singles match to retain the IWGP Heavyweight Championship
19	WWE: Raw; SmackDown	Capitol Punishment	Washington, D.C.	John Cena (c) defeated R-Truth in a Singles match to retain the WWE Championship
26	ROH	Best in the World	New York	Davey Richards defeated Eddie Edwards (c) in a Singles match to win the ROH World Championship
(c) – denotes defending champion(s)

=== July ===
Date	Promotion(s)	Event	Location	Main event	Notes
10	TNA	Destination X	Orlando	A.J. Styles defeated Christopher Daniels in a Singles Match	
15	WWC	38th WWC Aniversario	Bayamon, Puerto Rico	AJ Castillo and El Cuervo defeated Chris Joel and Steve Joel	
17	WWC	38th WWC Aniversario - Night 2	Ponce, Puerto Rico	Mr. Big defeated Black Pain	
17	WWE: Raw; SmackDown	Money in the Bank	Rosemont	CM Punk defeated John Cena (c) in a Singles match to win the WWE Championship; Since Cena lost, he was supposed to be fired.	The decision to fire Cena was overturned by new Chief Operating Officer Triple H and because CM Punk (kayfabe) left the WWE with the championship after winning it. This match received a 5 Star rating from Dave Meltzer, the first WWE match since 1997 to do so.
(c) – denotes defending champion(s)

=== August ===
Date	Promotion(s)	Event	Location	Main event	Notes
7	TNA	Hardcore Justice	Orlando	Kurt Angle defeated Sting (c) in a Singles Match to win the TNA World Heavyweight Championship	
1-14	NJPW	G1 Climax final	Tokyo	Shinsuke Nakamura defeated Tetsuya Naito in a G1 Climax tournament	
14	JCW	Bloodymania 5	Cave-In-Rock, Illinois	Corporal Robinson (c) defeated Vampiro for the JCW World Heavyweight Championship	
14	WWE: Raw; SmackDown	SummerSlam	Los Angeles	CM Punk (c) defeated John Cena (c) in a Singles match to win the undisputed WWE Championship with Triple H as the special guest referee, then Alberto Del Rio cashed in his Money in the Bank contract and defeated CM Punk (c) in a Singles match to win the WWE Championship.	This was the last PPV before the end of the first brand split.
20	PWG	Battle of Los Angeles	Reseda, California	El Generico defeated Kevin Steen in a Battle of Los Angeles tournament	
21	CMLL	Torneo de Parejas Increibles	Mexico City, Mexico	N/A	
(c) – denotes defending champion(s)

=== September ===
Date	Promotion(s)	Event	Location	Main event	Notes
11	TNA	No Surrender	Orlando	Kurt Angle (c) defeated Sting and Mr. Anderson in a Three-way match to retain the TNA World Heavyweight Championship	
17	ROH	Death Before Dishonor	New York	The All Night Express (Rhett Titus and Kenny King) defeated Briscoe Brothers (Jay Briscoe and Mark Briscoe) in a Ladder War III to determine the number one contender for the ROH World Tag Team Championship at Glory By Honor X	
18	WWE	Night of Champions	Buffalo	Triple H defeated CM Punk in a No Disqualification match	First WWE pay-per-view following the end of the first WWE brand extension.
30	CMLL	CMLL 78th Anniversary Show	Mexico City, Mexico	10-man steel cage elimination match Lucha de Apuestas, "hair vs. hair" match	
(c) – denotes defending champion(s)

=== October ===
Date	Promotion(s)	Event	Location	Main event
2	WWE	Hell in a Cell	New Orleans	Alberto Del Rio defeated John Cena (c) and CM Punk in a Triple threat Hell in a Cell match to win the WWE Championship
9	AAA	Héroes Inmortales IV	Ciudad Madero, Tamaulipas, Mexico	Los Psycho Circus (Monster Clown, Murder Clown and Psycho Clown) defeated Los Perros del Mal (Damián 666, Halloween and Nicho el Millonario) in a Six-man tag team steel cage Masks vs. Hairs match
10	NJPW	Destruction	Tokyo	Hiroshi Tanahashi (c) defeated Tetsuya Naito in a Singles match to retain the IWGP Heavyweight Championship
16	TNA	Bound for Glory	Philadelphia	Kurt Angle (c) defeated Bobby Roode in a Singles match to retain the TNA World Heavyweight Championship
23	WWE	Vengeance	San Antonio	Alberto Del Rio (c) defeated John Cena in a Last Man Standing match to retain the WWE Championship
(c) – denotes defending champion(s)

=== November ===
Date	Promotion(s)	Event	Location	Main event	Notes
12	NJPW	Power Struggle	Osaka	Hiroshi Tanahashi (c) defeated Toru Yano in a Singles match to retain the IWGP Heavyweight Championship	
13	TNA	Turning Point	Orlando	Bobby Roode (c) defeated A.J. Styles in a Singles match to retain the TNA World Heavyweight Championship	
19	ROH	Glory By Honor X	Chicago Ridge	Davey Richards (c) defeated El Generico in a Singles match to retain the ROH World Championship	
20	WWE	Survivor Series	New York City	John Cena and The Rock defeated The Miz and R-Truth in a Tag team match	This was The Rock's first match since WrestleMania XX in 2004
(c) – denotes defending champion(s)

=== December ===
Date	Promotion(s)	Event	Location	Main event
1	WWE	Tribute to the Troops	Fayetteville, North Carolina	John Cena, Big Show and CM Punk defeated Mark Henry, The Miz and Alberto Del Rio in a Six-man tag team match
11	TNA	Final Resolution	Orlando	Bobby Roode (c) wrestled A.J. Styles to a 3–3 draw in a 30-Minute Iron Man match for the TNA World Heavyweight Championship
16	CMLL	Sin Piedad	Mexico City, Mexico	Blue Panther defeated El Felino by disqualification in a Best two-out-of-three falls Lucha de Apuestas, hair vs. hair match
18	WWE	TLC: Tables, Ladders & Chairs	Baltimore	CM Punk (c) defeated The Miz and Alberto Del Rio in a Triple threat Tables, Ladders, and Chairs match to retain the WWE Championship
23	ROH	Final Battle	New York	Davey Richards (c) defeated Eddie Edwards in a Singles match to retain the ROH World Championship
(c) – denotes defending champion(s)

== Accomplishments and tournaments ==
=== AAA ===
Accomplishment	Winner	Date won	Notes
Rey de Reyes	Extreme Tiger	March 18	

=== JWP ===
Accomplishment	Winner	Date won	Notes
Blue Star Cup 2011	Manami Katsu	November 20	
Tag League The Best 2011	Kayoko Haruyama and Tsubasa Kuragaki	March 6	

=== Ring of Honor ===
Accomplishment	Winner	Date won	Notes
ROH World Tag Team Championship #1 Contender Lottery Tournament	Adam Cole and Kyle O'Reilly	July 8	

=== TNA ===
Accomplishment	Winner	Date won	Notes
TNA X Division Championship #1 Contender Tournament	Robbie E	February 13	
Xplosion Championship Challenge	Magnus	August 9	
X Division Showcase	Austin Aries	July 10	
Turkey Bowl	Eric Young	November 24	
Maximum Impact Tournament	Samoa Joe	December 13	

=== WWE ===
Accomplishment	Winner	Date won	Notes
Royal Rumble	Alberto Del Rio	January 30	First and only 40-man Royal Rumble match. Winner received their choice of a championship match for either Raw's WWE Championship or SmackDown's World Heavyweight Championship at WrestleMania XXVII; Del Rio last eliminated Santino Marella to win and chose to challenge for his own brand's World Heavyweight Championship, but was unsuccessful against Edge at the event.
NXT season 4	Johnny Curtis	March 1	Defeated Brodus Clay in the final to win season 4. Due to winning the season, Curtis earned himself and his Pro, R-Truth, a WWE Tag Team Championship match, but after R-Truth turned heel, Curtis teamed up with Michael McGillicutty and finally received the championship match on the October 11, 2012 episode of NXT, but they were defeated by champions Team Hell No (Daniel Bryan and Kane).
Money in the Bank ladder match (SmackDown)	Daniel Bryan	July 17	Defeated Cody Rhodes, Heath Slater, Justin Gabriel, Kane, Sin Cara, Sheamus, and Wade Barrett to win a World Heavyweight Championship match contract. After a voided cash-in attempt on Mark Henry in November, Bryan successfully cashed in his contract at TLC: Tables, Ladders & Chairs to win the title from Big Show, who had just won the title from Henry.
Money in the Bank ladder match (Raw)	Alberto Del Rio	July 17	Defeated Alex Riley, Evan Bourne, Jack Swagger, Kofi Kingston, The Miz, R-Truth, and Rey Mysterio to win a WWE Championship match contract. Del Rio cashed in the contract at SummerSlam and won the title from CM Punk, who had just defeated John Cena to determine the undisputed WWE Champion.
WWE Championship Tournament	Rey Mysterio	July 25	Defeated The Miz in the tournament final to win the vacant WWE Championship; CM Punk had won the title the week before at Money in the Bank, but left WWE with the title, thus WWE set up a tournament to crown a new champion.

==== WWE Hall of Fame ====
Category	Inductee	Inducted by
Individual	Shawn Michaels	Triple H
Individual	"Hacksaw" Jim Duggan	Ted DiBiase
Individual	"Bullet" Bob Armstrong	Scott, Brad, and Brian Armstrong
Individual	Sunny	WWE Divas
Individual	Abdullah the Butcher	Terry Funk
Group	The Road Warriors	Dusty Rhodes
Celebrity	Drew Carey	Kane

==== Slammy Awards ====
Poll	Winner
Outstanding Achievement in Muppet Resemblance	Sheamus and his long lost, red-headed relative Beaker
The Pee-wee Herman Bowtie Award	David Otunga, for his Harvard-law-by-way-of-the-Playhouse business attire
Most Predictable Outcome of the Year	Kevin Nash's powerbomb to Santino Marella after the trombone dance
Guess Who's Back or: Return of the Year	The Rock
Double Vision Moment of the Year	Sin Cara vs. Sin Cara
T-shirt of the Year	CM Punk for "Best in the World" T-shirt
WWE.com Exclusive of the Year	John Laurinaitis congratulates CM Punk
Most Regrettable Attire of the Year	Michael Cole as Triple H
Critter Moment of the Year	The mouse that ran past Alberto Del Rio on Raw
Superstar Transformation of the Year	Zack Ryder
"Tell Me I Did NOT Just See That" Moment of the Year	Jim Ross dancing during the "Michael Cole Challenge" on Raw Supershow
Holy $#!+ Move of the Year	Big Show and Mark Henry implode the ring after a superplex at Vengeance
"Pipe Bomb" of the Year	CM Punk
Divalicious Moment of the Year	Kelly Kelly wins the WWE Divas Championship
OMG Moment of the Year	Triple H performs The Undertaker's Tombstone Piledriver on The Undertaker at WrestleMania XXVII
#Trending Superstar of the Year	Zack Ryder
Game Changer of the Year	John Cena vs. The Rock at WrestleMania XXVIII
WWE A-lister of the Year	Nicole "Snooki" Polizzi
Superstar of the Year	CM Punk

== Awards and honors ==
=== Pro Wrestling Illustrated ===
Category	Winner
PWI Wrestler of the Year	CM Punk
PWI Tag Team of the Year	Beer Money, Inc. (Robert Roode and James Storm)
PWI Match of the Year	John Cena vs. CM Punk (Money in the Bank)
PWI Feud of the Year	CM Punk vs. John Cena
PWI Most Popular Wrestler of the Year	CM Punk
PWI Most Hated Wrestler of the Year	The Miz
PWI Comeback of the Year	Sting
PWI Most Improved Wrestler of the Year	Mark Henry
PWI Most Inspirational Wrestler of the Year	Rosita
PWI Rookie of the Year	Ace Hawkins
PWI Woman of the Year	Mickie James
PWI Lifetime Achievement	Randy Savage

=== Wrestling Observer Newsletter ===
==== Wrestling Observer Newsletter Hall of Fame ====
Inductee
Kent Walton
Steve Williams
Curtis Iaukea

==== Wrestling Observer Newsletter awards ====
Category	Winner
Wrestler of the Year	Hiroshi Tanahashi
Most Outstanding	Davey Richards
Best Box Office Draw	The Rock
Feud of the Year	John Cena vs. CM Punk
Tag Team of the Year	Bad Intentions (Giant Bernard and Karl Anderson)
Most Improved	Dolph Ziggler
Best on Interviews	CM Punk

== Title changes ==
=== AAA ===
AAA Mega Championship
Incoming champion – El Zorro
Date	Winner	Event/Show	Note(s)
June 18	Jeff Jarrett	Triplemanía XIX	

AAA Latin American Championship
(Title created)
Date	Winner	Event/Show	Note(s)
June 18	Dr. Wagner Jr.	Triplemanía XIX	
December 16	L.A. Park	Guerra de Titanes	

AAA World Mini-Estrella Championship
Incoming champion – Octagoncito
Date	Winner	Event/Show	Note(s)
June 6	Mini Psicosis	Triplemanía XIX	

AAA World Cruiserweight Championship
Incoming champion – Jack Evans
Date	Winner	Event/Show	Note(s)
No title changes			

AAA World Tag Team Championship
Incoming champions – Los Maniacos (Silver King and Último Gladiador)
Date	Winner	Event/Show	Note(s)
March 21	Extreme Tiger and Jack Evans	AAA Sin Límite TV Taping	
October 9	La Legión Extranjera (Abyss and Chessman)	AAA Sin Límite TV Taping	

AAA World Mixed Tag Team Championship
Incoming champions – Faby Apache and Pimpinela Escarlata
Date	Winner	Event/Show	Note(s)
March 13	La Sociedad (Alan Stone and Jennifer Blake)	AAA Television Taping	

AAA World Trios Championship
(Title created)
Date	Winner	Event/Show	Note(s)
June 18	Los Perros del Mal (Damián 666, Halloween and X-Fly)	Triplemania XIX	

=== NJPW ===
IWGP Heavyweight Championship
Incoming champion – Satoshi Kojima
Date	Winner	Event/Show	Note(s)
January 4	Hiroshi Tanahashi	Wrestle Kingdom V	

IWGP Intercontinental Championship
(Title created)
Date	Winner	Event/Show	Note(s)
May 15	MVP	Invasion Tour 2011: Attack on East Coast	Defeated Toru Yano in an eight–man tournament final to become the inaugural champion.
October 10	Masato Tanaka	Destruction '11	

IWGP Tag Team Championship
Incoming champions – Bad Intentions (Giant Bernard and Karl Anderson)
Date	Winner	Event/Show	Note(s)
No title changes

IWGP Junior Heavyweight Championship
Incoming champion – Prince Devitt
Date	Winner	Event/Show	Note(s)
June 18	Kota Ibushi	Dominion 6.18	
September 12	Vacated	–	The championship was vacated after Ibushi was sidelined with a shoulder injury.
September 19	Prince Devitt	Kantaro Hoshino Memorial Show	Devitt defeated Kushida to win the vacant championship.

IWGP Junior Heavyweight Tag Team Championship
Incoming champions – Golden☆Lovers (Kenny Omega and Kota Ibushi)
Date	Winner	Event/Show	Note(s)
January 23	Apollo 55 (Prince Devitt and Ryusuke Taguchi)	Fantastica Mania 2011	
October 10	No Remorse Corps (Davey Richards and Rocky Romero)	Destruction '11	

=== ROH ===
ROH World Championship
Incoming champion – Roderick Strong
Date	Winner	Event/Show	Note(s)
March 19	Eddie Edwards	Manhattan Mayhem IV	
June 26	Davey Richards	Best in the World	

ROH World Television Championship
Incoming champion – Christopher Daniels
Date	Winner	Event/Show	Note(s)
June 26	El Generico	Best in the World	
August 13	Jay Lethal	Ring of Honor Wrestling	

ROH World Tag Team Championship
Incoming champions – The Briscoe Brothers (Jay and Mark Briscoe)
Date	Winner	Event/Show	Note(s)
April 1	Wrestling's Greatest Tag Team (Charlie Haas and Shelton Benjamin)	Honor Takes Center Stage	
December 23	The Briscoe Brothers (Jay and Mark Briscoe)	Final Battle	

=== TNA ===
TNA World Heavyweight Championship
Incoming champion – Jeff Hardy
Date	Winner	Event/Show	Note(s)
January 9	Mr. Anderson	Genesis	
February 13	Jeff Hardy	Against All Odds	This was a ladder match
February 24 (aired March 3)	Sting	Impact!	
June 12	Mr. Anderson	Slammiversary	
July 11 (aired July 14)	Sting	Impact Wrestling	
August 7	Kurt Angle	Hardcore Justice	
October 18 (aired October 20)	James Storm	Impact Wrestling	
October 26 (aired November 3)	Bobby Roode	Impact Wrestling	

TNA X Division Championship
Incoming champion – Jay Lethal
Date	Winner	Event/Show	Note(s)
January 9	Kazarian	Genesis	
May 16	Abyss	Impact Wrestling	
July 10	Brian Kendrick	Destination X	
September 11	Austin Aries	No Surrender	

TNA World Tag Team Championship
Incoming champions – The Motor City Machine Guns (Alex Shelley and Chris Sabin)
Date	Winner	Event/Show	Note(s)
January 9	Beer Money, Inc. (James Storm and Robert/Bobby Roode)	Genesis	
August 9	Mexican America (Anarquia and Hernandez)	Impact Wrestling	
November 14	Crimson and Matt Morgan	Impact Wrestling	

TNA Knockouts Tag Team Championship
Incoming champions – Angelina Love and Winter
Date	Winner	Event/Show	Note(s)
March 13	Mexican America (Sarita and Rosita)	Victory Road	
July 21	TnT (Brooke Tessmacher and Tara)	Impact Wrestling	
November 3	Gail Kim and Madison Rayne	Impact Wrestling	

TNA Knockouts Championship
Incoming champion – Madison Rayne
Date	Winner	Event/Show	Note(s)
April 17	Mickie James	Lockdown	
August 7	Winter	Hardcore Justice	
August 25	Mickie James	Impact Wrestling	
September 11	Winter	No Surrender	
October 16	Velvet Sky	Bound for Glory	
November 13	Gail Kim	Turning Point	

TNA Television Championship
Incoming champion – Douglas Williams
Date	Winner	Event/Show	Note(s)
January 9	Abyss	Genesis	
March 14	Vacated	Impact!	
March 14	Gunner	Impact!	
May 17	Eric Young	Impact Wrestling	
November 13	Robbie E	Turning Point	

=== WWE ===
– Raw
– SmackDown

Prior to the end of the first WWE brand extension in August, Raw and SmackDown each had a world championship and a secondary championship, while the women's championship and male tag team championship were shared across the two brands.

WWE Championship
Incoming champion – The Miz
Date	Winner	Event/Show	Note(s)
May 1	John Cena	Extreme Rules	Triple threat steel cage match, also involving John Morrison.
July 17	CM Punk	Money in the Bank	CM Punk (kayfabe) left the WWE the day after with the championship. He returned on the July 25 episode of Raw; his reign was deemed to continue through this period.
July 25	Rey Mysterio	Monday Night Raw	Defeated The Miz in a tournament final for the vacant championship. CM Punk was also recognized as champion.
July 25	John Cena	Monday Night Raw	New Chief Operating Officer Triple H decreed that Rey Mysterio had to face former champion John Cena. CM Punk was also recognized as champion.
August 14	CM Punk	SummerSlam	Defeated John Cena in a match to determine the undisputed WWE Champion. This is considered a continuation of Punk's first reign, lasting a total of 28 days. Triple H was the special guest referee.
August 14	Alberto Del Rio	SummerSlam	Cashed in his Money in the Bank contract after CM Punk was attacked by Kevin Nash.
The first WWE brand extension ended on August 29, and the WWE Champion could appear on both Raw and SmackDown.
September 18	John Cena	Night of Champions	
October 2	Alberto Del Rio	Hell in a Cell	Triple threat match, also involving CM Punk.
November 20	CM Punk	Survivor Series	

World Heavyweight Championship
Incoming champion – Edge
Date	Winner	Event/Show	Note(s)
February 15 (aired February 18)	Vacated	SmackDown	Edge was stripped of the title by SmackDown General Manager Vickie Guerrero as a result of using the spear (which had been banned) in a previous match.
February 15 (aired February 18)	Dolph Ziggler	SmackDown	SmackDown General Manager Vickie Guerrero awarded the title to Ziggler.
February 15 (aired February 18)	Edge	SmackDown	Edge was awarded a rematch the same night by returning General Manager, Theodore Long.
April 12 (aired April 15)	Vacated	SmackDown	Title declared vacant due to Edge's retirement.
May 1	Christian	Extreme Rules	Defeated Alberto Del Rio in a ladder match to win the vacant title.
May 3 (aired May 6)	Randy Orton	SmackDown	
July 17	Christian	Money in the Bank	Defeated Randy Orton by disqualification after being hit with a low-blow. The stipulations of the match allowed the title to change hands via disqualification.
August 14	Randy Orton	SummerSlam	No Holds Barred match
The first WWE brand extension ended on August 29, and the World Heavyweight Champion could appear on both Raw and SmackDown.
September 18	Mark Henry	Night of Champions	On the November 25 episode of SmackDown, Daniel Bryan cashed in his Money in the Bank contract and pinned Henry. However, SmackDown General Manager Theodore Long revealed that Henry was not medically cleared to compete and voided the match. Henry remained champion and the briefcase was returned to Bryan.
December 18	Big Show	TLC: Tables, Ladders & Chairs	Chairs match
December 18	Daniel Bryan	TLC: Tables, Ladders & Chairs	Cashed in his Money in the Bank contract.

WWE United States Championship
Incoming champion – Daniel Bryan
Date	Winner	Event/Show	Note(s)
March 14	Sheamus	Monday Night Raw	If Sheamus lost, he would have quit the WWE.
The title became exclusive to the SmackDown brand following the 2011 WWE draft when Sheamus was drafted to SmackDown.
May 1	Kofi Kingston	Extreme Rules	Tables match
The title became exclusive to the Raw brand due to Kofi Kingston being a member of the Raw roster.
June 19	Dolph Ziggler	Capitol Punishment	
The first WWE brand extension ended on August 29, and the United States Champion could appear on both Raw and SmackDown.
December 18	Zack Ryder	TLC: Tables, Ladders & Chairs	

WWE Intercontinental Championship
Incoming champion – Dolph Ziggler
Date	Winner	Event/Show	Note(s)
January 4 (aired January 7)	Kofi Kingston	SmackDown	
March 22 (aired March 25)	Wade Barrett	SmackDown	
June 19	Ezekiel Jackson	Capitol Punishment	
August 9 (aired August 12)	Cody Rhodes	SmackDown	
The first WWE brand extension ended on August 29, and the Intercontinental Champion could appear on both Raw and SmackDown.

WWE Divas Championship
Incoming champion – Natalya
Date	Winner	Event/Show	Note(s)
January 30	Eve Torres	Royal Rumble	Fatal four-way match, also involving Layla and Michelle McCool. Eve pinned Layla to win.
April 11	Brie Bella	Monday Night Raw	
June 20	Kelly Kelly	Raw: Power to the People	This was a Power to the People special episode of Raw, where Brie Bella's opponent was determined by a fan-voted poll. Kelly Kelly received the highest number of votes over Beth Phoenix and Eve Torres.
October 2	Beth Phoenix	Hell in a Cell	

WWE Tag Team Championship
Incoming champions – Santino Marella and Vladimir Kozlov
Date	Winner	Event/Show	Note(s)
February 20	The Corre (Heath Slater and Justin Gabriel)	Elimination Chamber	
February 21	John Cena and The Miz	Monday Night Raw	
February 21	The Corre (Heath Slater and Justin Gabriel)	Monday Night Raw	
April 19 (aired April 22)	Big Show and Kane	SmackDown	
May 23	The New Nexus (David Otunga and Michael McGillicutty)	Monday Night Raw	Otunga and McGillicutty won the title under the name of The New Nexus, but the stable disbanded during their reign.
August 22	Air Boom (Evan Bourne and Kofi Kingston)	Monday Night Raw	

== Debuts ==
- January 23
  - Eri Susa
  - Mayu Iwatani
  - Arisa Hoshiki
- February 26 - Meari Naito (Ice Ribbon)
- March 2 – Neko Nitta
- March 11 - Maki Narumiya
- April 17 - Sareee
- May 4 – Trans-Am Hiroshi
- May 13 - EVIL
- June 1 – Solo Darling
- June 18 – Marius Al-Ani
- June 19 - Bandido
- June 26 – Saki Kashima
- July 7 – Cameron
- July 21 - Nana Kawasa
- August 7 – Rabbit Miu
- September 7 – Punch Tominaga
- September 18 – Yusaku Ito
- October 22 – Gianni Valletta
- October 23 – Jason Lee
- October 29 – Hektor Invictus
- November 24 – Koji Doi
- December 18 – Summer Rae

== Retirements ==
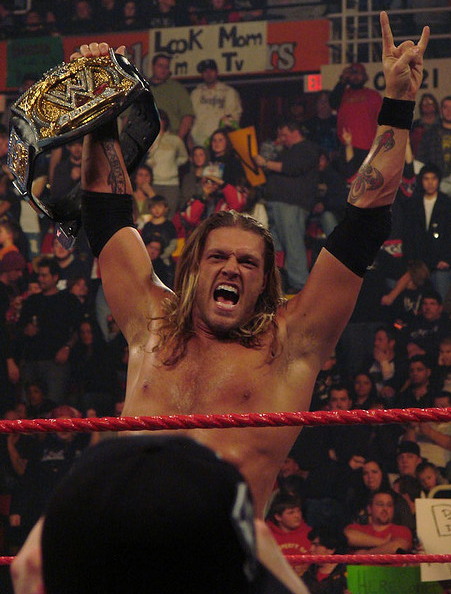
Edge was forced to retire due to a neck injury; however, in 2020, he was cleared to compete again and returned at that year's Royal Rumble in the namesake match

- Krissy Vaine (September 2000 – 2011) (returned to wrestling in 2019)
- Taylor Wilde (June 2003 – February 5, 2011) (returned to Impact Wrestling on April 25, 2021 at the Rebellion)
- Pierre Carl Ouellet (1987-February 8, 2011) (returned to wrestling in 2016)
- Edge (1992 – April 11, 2011) (was medically cleared in 2020 and returned in that year's Men's Royal Rumble match)
- Gypsy Joe (1951-January 7, 2011)
- Dave Kidney (1950s-January 28, 2011)
- Estrella Blanca (1954-April 17, 2011)
- Michelle McCool (November 18, 2004 – May 1, 2011) (brief return in 2018 - Royal Rumble and WWE Evolution)
- Chyna (1995 – May 15, 2011)
- Roddy Piper (1969–August 12, 2011)
- Brett DiBiase (July 22, 2008 – August 22, 2011)
- Daizee Haze (March 29, 2002 – October 1, 2011)
- Daikokubō Benkei (November 10, 1994 – October 23, 2011)
- Maryse (July 10, 2006 – October 28, 2011) (as a professional wrestler) (returned to WWE in April 2016 to become her husband's manager/valet and has had a couple of one-off tag team matches teaming with her husband, including one at WrestleMania 33)
- Takeshi Rikio (May 28, 2000 – November 27, 2011)
- Nigel McGuinness (September 1999 – December 17, 2011)
- Brent Albright (October 10, 1998 – December 17, 2011)

== Deaths ==
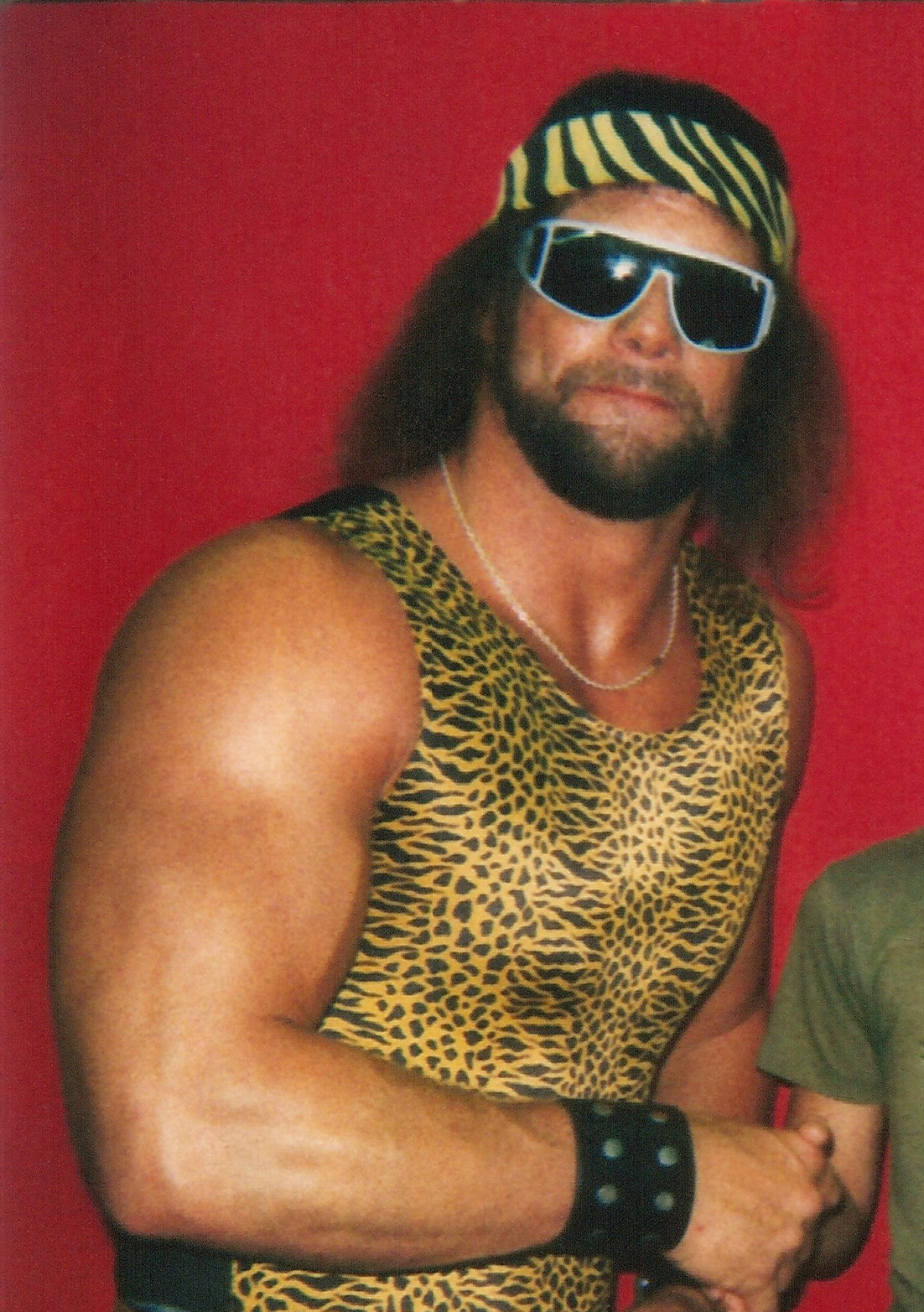
Randy Savage

- January 1 - Verne Langdon, 69
- January 7 – Val Puccio, 45
- January 11 - Paul Lincoln, 78
- January 23 - Jack LaLanne, 96
- January 26 - Shawn Osborne, 34
- January 27 - Johnny Heidemann, 90
- February 2 - Wolf, 38
- March 17 - Fabián el Gitano, 39
- March 20 – Oliver Humperdink, 62
- April 9 - Chip Fairway, 38
- April 11 - Larry Sweeney, 30
- May 20 – Randy Savage, 58
- June 21 - Tim Burke, 50
- August 11 – Scott LeDoux, 62
- August 20 – Rafael Halperin, (b. 1924) 86 or 87
- August 25 – Donna Christianello, 69
- September 6 – Little Tokyo, 70
- September 20 - Johnny Barend, 82
- October 11 – Doctor X, 43
- November 10 - Killer Karl Kox, 80
- November 22 - Bison Smith, 38
- December 21 - Umanosuke Ueda, 71

== See also ==
- List of NJPW pay-per-view events
- List of ROH pay-per-view events
- List of TNA pay-per-view events
- List of WWE pay-per-view events
