= Fortune (professional wrestling) =

Professional wrestling stable

- The logo of Fortune

Stable
- Members: See below
- Name(s): Fortune; Fourtune
- Debut: June 17, 2010
- Disbanded: January 5, 2012

Fortune (originally spelled Fourtune) was a professional wrestling stable in the Total Nonstop Action Wrestling (TNA) promotion. Originally consisting of leader Ric Flair, A.J. Styles, James Storm, Kazarian, and Robert Roode, the group was modeled and named after Flair's former alliance, the Four Horsemen. The group later also came to include Christopher Daniels, Douglas Williams, Rob Terry, and Matt Morgan.

== History ==
=== Formation and feud with EV 2.0 (2010) ===
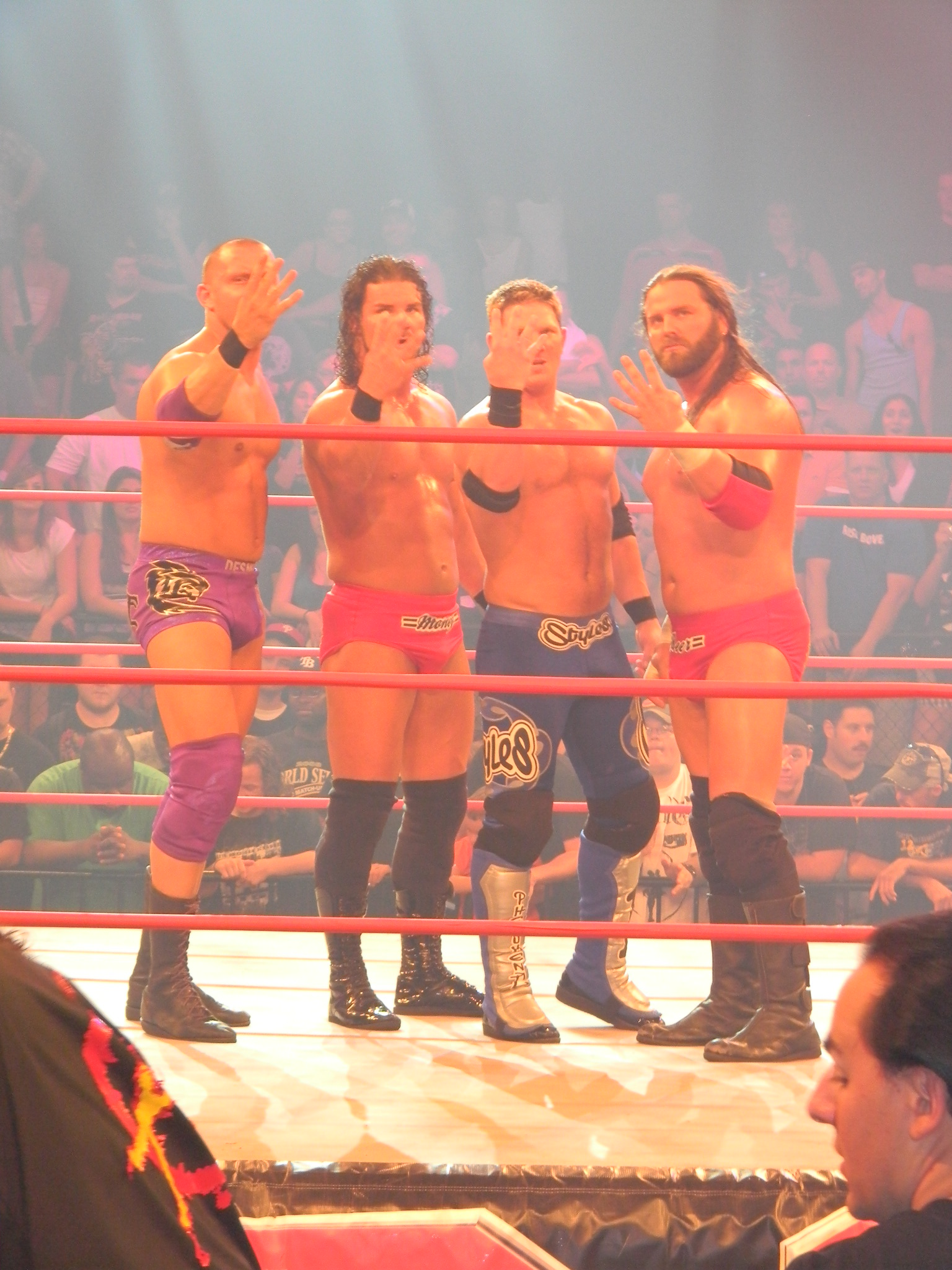
Fourtune hopefuls: (from left to right) Desmond Wolfe, Robert Roode, A.J. Styles, and James Storm

On the January 4, 2010, live, three-hour episode of Total Nonstop Action Wrestling (TNA)'s Impact! television show, Ric Flair made his debut for the company, observing the main event match between A.J. Styles and Kurt Angle. On January 17 at the Genesis pay-per-view, Flair helped Styles defeat Angle to retain the TNA World Heavyweight Championship, and in the process turned both himself and Styles heel. On the following episode of Impact!, Flair announced that he was going to take Styles under his wing and make him the next Nature Boy. On the February 24 episode of Impact! Flair and Styles were joined by Desmond Wolfe and in the weeks leading to Lockdown Beer Money, Inc. (James Storm and Robert Roode) and Sting were added to the group to complete Team Flair for the annual Lethal Lockdown match. On April 18 at Lockdown, Team Flair was defeated by Team Hogan (Abyss, Jeff Hardy, Jeff Jarrett and Rob Van Dam) and the following night on Impact! Styles lost the TNA World Heavyweight Championship to Van Dam. After Lockdown Sting left the group and went on to feud with Jarrett, while the rest of Team Flair remained intact.

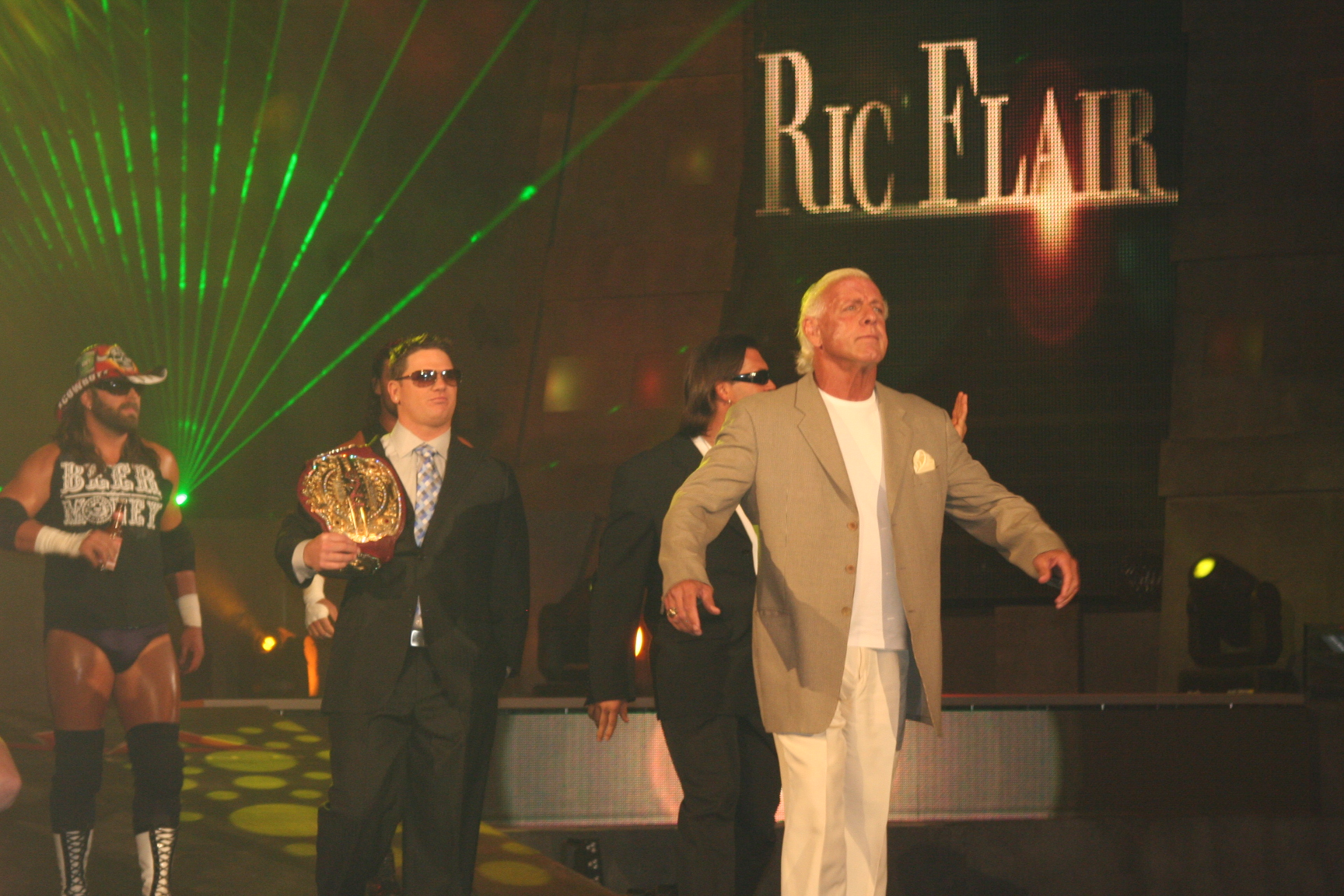
Ric Flair leading Fourtune to the ring in July 2010

With Styles' recent shortcomings, Flair adopted X Division standout Kazarian as his newest protégé on the May 27 episode of Impact!, much to Styles' dismay. On the June 17 episode of Impact!, Flair announced that he would reform the legendary stable Four Horsemen under the new name Fourtune (though not legally permitted to use the Four Horsemen moniker due to WWE's ownership) and compared Styles to his former Four Horsemen partner Arn Anderson, Kazarian to Barry Windham, Roode and Storm to Ole Anderson and Tully Blanchard and Wolfe to Lex Luger, while also stating that each of them would have to earn their spots in the group. Flair, wanting peace between Styles and Kazarian, booked them in a tag team match against Samoa Joe and TNA Global Champion Rob Terry at Victory Road. The plan seemed to work as Styles and Kazarian worked together and were victorious due to outside interference from Desmond Wolfe and, on the July 15 episode of Impact!, Flair announced that Styles and Kazarian had earned their spots in Fourtune. Wolfe confronted Flair and demanded a membership in the group, but was not given one due to his long losing streak. On the July 22 episode of Impact!, Styles defeated Rob Terry to win the Global Championship, after some assistance from Kazarian, and the following week renamed the title the TNA Television Championship. That same night Fourtune's lineup was seemingly completed with the addition of Robert Roode and James Storm as the final two members, leaving Desmond Wolfe outside the group.

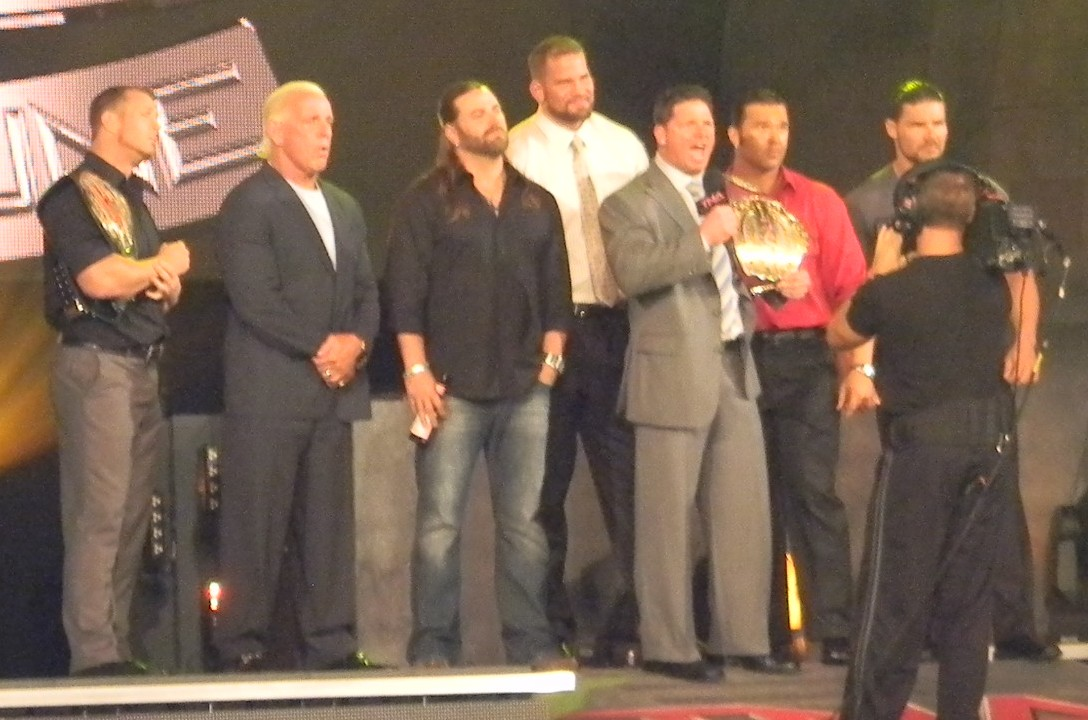
Fourtune in August 2010

On the August 12 episode of Impact!, TNA X Division Champion Douglas Williams, who had helped Flair defeat his nemesis Jay Lethal in a Street Fight the previous week, and Matt Morgan were added to Fourtune, as the stable attacked Extreme, Version 2.0 (EV 2.0), a stable consisting of former Extreme Championship Wrestling performers. Fourtune had hoped to drive the ECW originals, whom they considered outsiders in their company, out of TNA, but the following week TNA president Dixie Carter sided with EV 2.0 and signed each of its members to contracts so they could settle their score with Fourtune. In the first official matches between the two feuding factions, Styles defeated EV 2.0 leader Tommy Dreamer in a singles match, while Beer Money, Inc. squashed The Full Blooded Italians (Guido Maritato and Tony Luke) in a tag team match. At No Surrender, Fourtune defeated EV 2.0 in both of the matches between the two factions, when Douglas Williams retained his X Division Championship against Sabu and A.J. Styles defeated EV 2.0 leader Tommy Dreamer in an "I Quit" match. On September 6, at the tapings of the September 16 episode of Impact!, Williams lost the X Division Championship to Jay Lethal. Later that same night, Tommy Dreamer appeared on the Impact! Zone without his EV 2.0 partners, admitted his defeat and attempted to reach a truce with Fourtune, but was beaten down. The following week, he returned with Raven, Stevie Richards, Sabu and Rhino and announced that Dixie Carter had given the five of them a Lethal Lockdown match against Fourtune at Bound for Glory. Later that same night, A.J. Styles defeated Sabu in a ladder match contested for the advantage at Bound for Glory. In the weeks leading to Bound for Glory, the stable's name was tweaked to Fortune to represent the expansion in the number of members in the group. On the October 7 live episode of Impact!, Ric Flair was defeated by EV 2.0 member Mick Foley in a Last Man Standing match. At Bound for Glory, Styles, Kazarian, Morgan, Roode and Storm were defeated in a Lethal Lockdown match by Dreamer, Raven, Rhino, Richards and Sabu.

=== Storyline with Immortal (2010–2011) ===
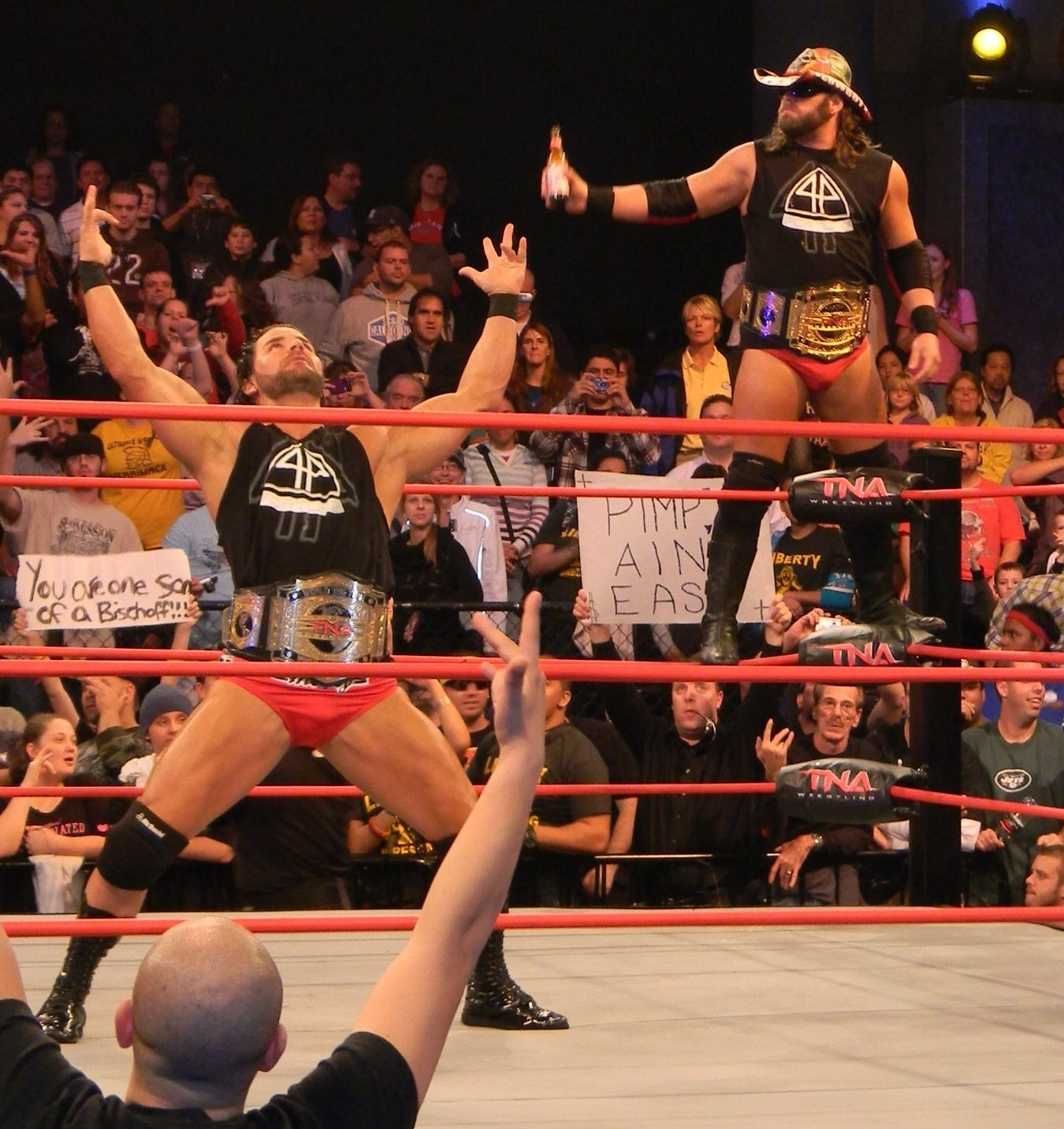
Beer Money, Inc. representing Fortune as the TNA World Tag Team Champions

On the October 14 episode of Impact!, Fortune teased a face turn by confronting the new heel regime of Hulk Hogan, Eric Bischoff, Jeff Jarrett, Abyss, and new TNA World Heavyweight Champion Jeff Hardy, collectively known as Immortal. After a brief staredown, Flair and Hogan would embrace instead, signifying a new alliance between the two heel groups. Later that night, Fortune defeated D'Angelo Dinero in a five-on-one handicap match. On the October 28 episode of Impact!, the rest of Fortune, minus Douglas Williams, turned on Matt Morgan and kicked him out of the group, when he showed concern for the concussed Mr. Anderson and didn't want him to wrestle Jeff Jarrett in a chain match in the main event of the night. During that same night tensions also rose between Williams and the rest of Fortune, excluding Ric Flair, who thought he had a bad attitude. Williams then replaced Kazarian in a tag team match, where he and A.J. Styles defeated EV 2.0 members Rob Van Dam and Raven, after Styles blind tagged Williams and stole his pinfall. On the Reaction following Impact!, Williams backed up Morgan and stated that he admired him for taking a stand, while also voicing his own concern for not being able to spotlight his talent, while a member of Fortune. The following week Flair ordered Kazarian and Williams to settle their differences in the ring. Kazarian won the match between the members of Fortune, after a miscommunication between Williams and James Storm. After the match Flair made Williams and Kazarian shake hands. At Turning Point Styles, Kazarian, Williams, Roode and Storm, all once again on the same page, defeated EV 2.0's Brian Kendrick, Raven, Rhino, Sabu and Stevie Richards in a ten-man tag team match and as a result Flair earned the right to fire a member of EV 2.0. Flair chose Sabu, who was then legitimately released from TNA. The following week on Impact!, Williams, Roode and Storm faced former Fortune member Matt Morgan in a three-on-one handicap match. During the match Roode and Storm abandoned Williams and left him to be pinned by Morgan. The following week, Williams completed his face turn by taking out Fortune, when they interfered in a match between Morgan and Ric Flair, costing Flair the match. On December 5 at Final Resolution, Williams defeated Styles to win the TNA Television Championship.

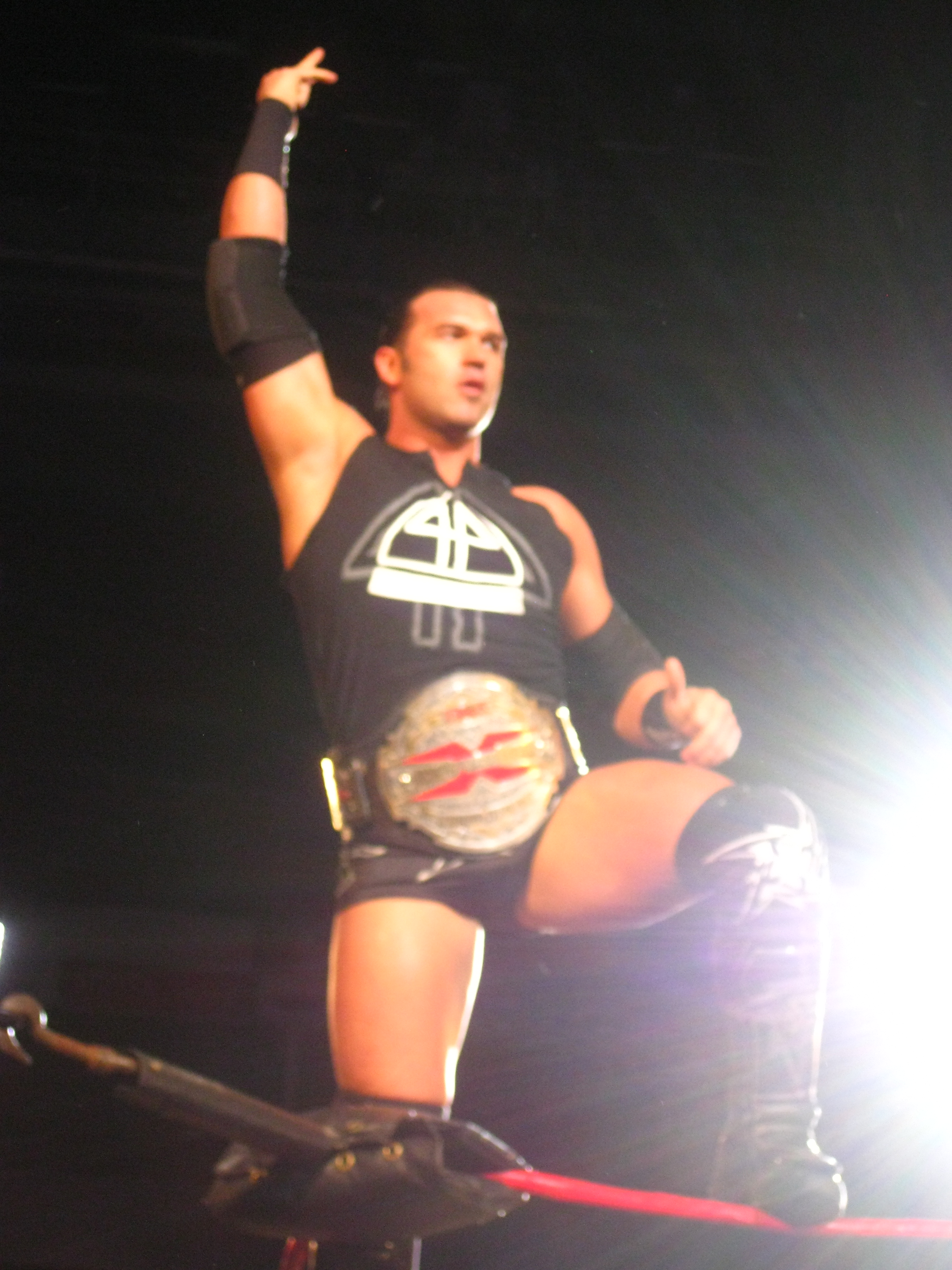
Kazarian representing Fortune as the TNA X Division Champion

On the December 9 episode of Impact!, Eric Bischoff declared that the alliance of Fortune and Immortal needed all the belts in TNA to use as a leverage in the upcoming court battle against Dixie Carter. On the December 23 episode of Impact!, Styles challenged Williams for the Television Championship in a 20 minute Iron Man match. The match ended in a 1–1 draw, setting up another match at Genesis, where Styles would put his spot in Fortune on the line against Williams' title. Later that night, Ric Flair hired Rob Terry to replace Matt Morgan as Fortunes bodyguard. On January 9, 2011, at Genesis, Kazarian defeated Jay Lethal to win the X Division Championship for the fourth time. Later at the same event, Beer Money, Inc. defeated The Motor City Machine Guns (Alex Shelley and Chris Sabin) to also bring the TNA World Tag Team Championship to Fortune. A.J. Styles was forced to pull out of his match with Douglas Williams, after suffering a legitimate hip injury, but ended up costing Williams the title in his match against Abyss, after running in and hitting him with the title belt. As a result, the alliance of Fortune and Immortal now held all the male championships in TNA. However, this didn't last long as in the main event of the evening Jeff Hardy lost the TNA World Heavyweight Championship to Mr. Anderson.

On January 31 at the tapings of the February 3 episode of Impact!, Fortune, without Flair, who was not at the show due to a torn rotator cuff, turned face by attacking Immortal, when they interfered in a TNA World Heavyweight Championship rematch between Anderson and Hardy, in the process revealing themselves to be the "they" Kurt Angle and Crimson had been referring to for the past weeks. A.J. Styles explained that Fortune was not going to allow Bischoff to destroy TNA like he did to World Championship Wrestling (WCW). Flair returned on February 14 at the tapings of the February 17 episode of Impact!, promising Eric Bischoff to bring Fortune and Immortal back together. Later, during a match between A.J. Styles and Immortal member Matt Hardy, Flair came to ringside cheering on Styles, before turning on him and costing him the match, revealing himself still being aligned with Immortal. On March 13 at Victory Road, Fortune scored a clean sweep, when Kazarian successfully defended the X Division Championship in an Ultimate X match against Jeremy Buck, Max Buck and Robbie E, Beer Money, Inc. successfully defended the World Tag Team Championship against Ink Inc. (Jesse Neal and Shannon Moore) and Styles defeated Matt Hardy, managed by Flair, in a singles match. On the following episode of Impact!, Styles was sidelined with a storyline injury, when Immortal's newest member, Bully Ray, aided by Flair, powerbombed him off the entrance stage through a table. On the March 31 episode of Impact!, Christopher Daniels made his return to TNA and aligned himself with Fortune in their battle with Immortal, vowing to avenge his best friend, A.J. Styles. On April 17 at Lockdown, Daniels, Kazarian, Roode and Storm defeated Immortal representatives Ric Flair, Abyss, Bully Ray and Matt Hardy in a Lethal Lockdown match, after Styles made his return and attacked Ray. On the following episode of Impact!, Daniels was officially named a member of Fortune. On May 16 at the tapings of the May 19 episode of Impact Wrestling, Kazarian lost the X Division Championship to Abyss. On June 12 at Slammiversary IX, Styles ended his feud with Bully Ray by losing to him in a Last Man Standing match. On July 10 at Destination X, TNA's first ever all X Division pay-per-view, Fortune members Styles and Daniels faced each other in the main event, with Styles emerging victorious. Fortune resumed their feud with Immortal on the July 14 episode of Impact Wrestling by disguising themselves as clowns and attacking each member of the group, preventing them from interfering in the evening's main event, where Mr. Anderson ended up losing the TNA World Heavyweight Championship to Sting. On August 7 at Hardcore Justice, Styles, Daniels and Kazarian defeated Immortal representatives Abyss, Gunner and Scott Steiner in a six-man tag team match. Two days later, at the tapings of the August 18 episode of Impact Wrestling, Beer Money, Inc.'s record-setting TNA World Tag Team Championship reign ended, when they lost the title to Mexican America (Anarquia and Hernandez).

=== Implosion and aftermath (2011) ===
After weeks of asking for a rematch from their Destination X bout, Styles finally granted Daniels one on the September 1 episode of Impact Wrestling, where Daniels managed to pick up the win. After the match, Daniels refused to shake hands with Styles. From June to September, Roode, Storm and Styles were three of the twelve participants in the Bound for Glory Series to determine the number one contender to the TNA World Heavyweight Championship. When the group stage of the tournament concluded, both Roode and Storm finished in the top four and thus advanced to the finals at No Surrender, while Styles finished sixth and was eliminated. On September 11 at No Surrender, Storm was eliminated from the tournament after losing to Bully Ray via disqualification. Meanwhile, Roode defeated Gunner via submission to set up a tiebreaker match against Ray later in the event, in which Roode managed to pick up the win via pinfall to become the number one contender to the TNA World Heavyweight Championship at Bound for Glory. In the weeks leading to Bound for Glory, TNA World Heavyweight Champion Kurt Angle, in an attempt to cause dissension within Fortune, forced Roode to face each of his stablemates in a series of singles matches, promising them title matches, should they be able to defeat him. In the first match on the September 15 episode of Impact Wrestling, Roode defeated Kazarian via submission. The following week, Daniels refused to face Roode, saying that he had nothing left to prove after defeating Styles on September 1. The arrogant Daniels was then confronted by Styles, which eventually led to a brawl, when he refused to give Styles a rematch. When the two were finally separated from each other by Kazarian, Daniels kicked Styles in the groin, completing his heel turn. The following two weeks, Roode finished his series of matches against his stablemates by defeating Styles and Storm. On October 16 at Bound for Glory, Roode failed in his attempt to win the TNA World Heavyweight Championship when he was pinned by Angle, after the referee failed to notice his arm under the ropes or Angle using the ropes for leverage. On the following episode of Impact Wrestling, after it was revealed that Roode was not eligible for a rematch with Angle, new authority figure Sting gave the next title shot to James Storm, who then went on to defeat Angle to win the TNA World Heavyweight Championship for the first time.

On the November 3 episode of Impact Wrestling, Roode defeated Storm to win the TNA World Heavyweight Championship, after hitting him with his own beer bottle, turning heel in the process, effectively dissolving Beer Money, Inc. and breaking away from Fortune. Roode then went on to successfully defend the title against his former Fortune stablemate A.J. Styles on November 13 at Turning Point. The following month at Final Resolution, Styles wrestled Roode to a 3–3 draw in a 30-minute Iron Man match, meaning that Roode retained the title. On the December 22, 2011 episode of Impact Wrestling, Mike Tenay described Fortune as "defunct", signifying the end of the group. The last remnants of the former Fortune alliance came to their end on the January 5 episode of Impact Wrestling, when Kazarian turned on A.J. Styles during the finals of the Wild Card Tournament, leaving him to be defeated by the team of Magnus and Samoa Joe. Kazarian eventually came together with former Fortune stablemate Christopher Daniels to form a tag team named "Bad Influence". In April 2013, Daniels and Kazarian began teasing a Fortune reunion to battle the Aces & Eights stable, however, this plan was foiled by A.J. Styles and Bobby Roode both turning down offers to join them. Nonetheless, Roode would later join forces with Bad Influence in an occasional collective known as the Extraordinary Gentlemen's Organization (EGO).

== Members ==
I–II	Leaders
*	Founding member

=== Fortune ===
Member	Time
Ric Flair (*/I)	June 17, 2010 – February 17, 2011
A.J. Styles (II)	July 15, 2010 – January 5, 2012
Kazarian	July 15, 2010 – January 5, 2012
James Storm	July 22, 2010 – January 5, 2012
Bobby Roode	July 22, 2010 – November 3, 2011
Douglas Williams	August 12, 2010 – November 18, 2010
Matt Morgan	August 12, 2010 – October 28, 2010
Rob Terry	December 16, 2010 – February 3, 2011
Christopher Daniels	March 31, 2011 – September 22, 2011

== Championships and accomplishments ==
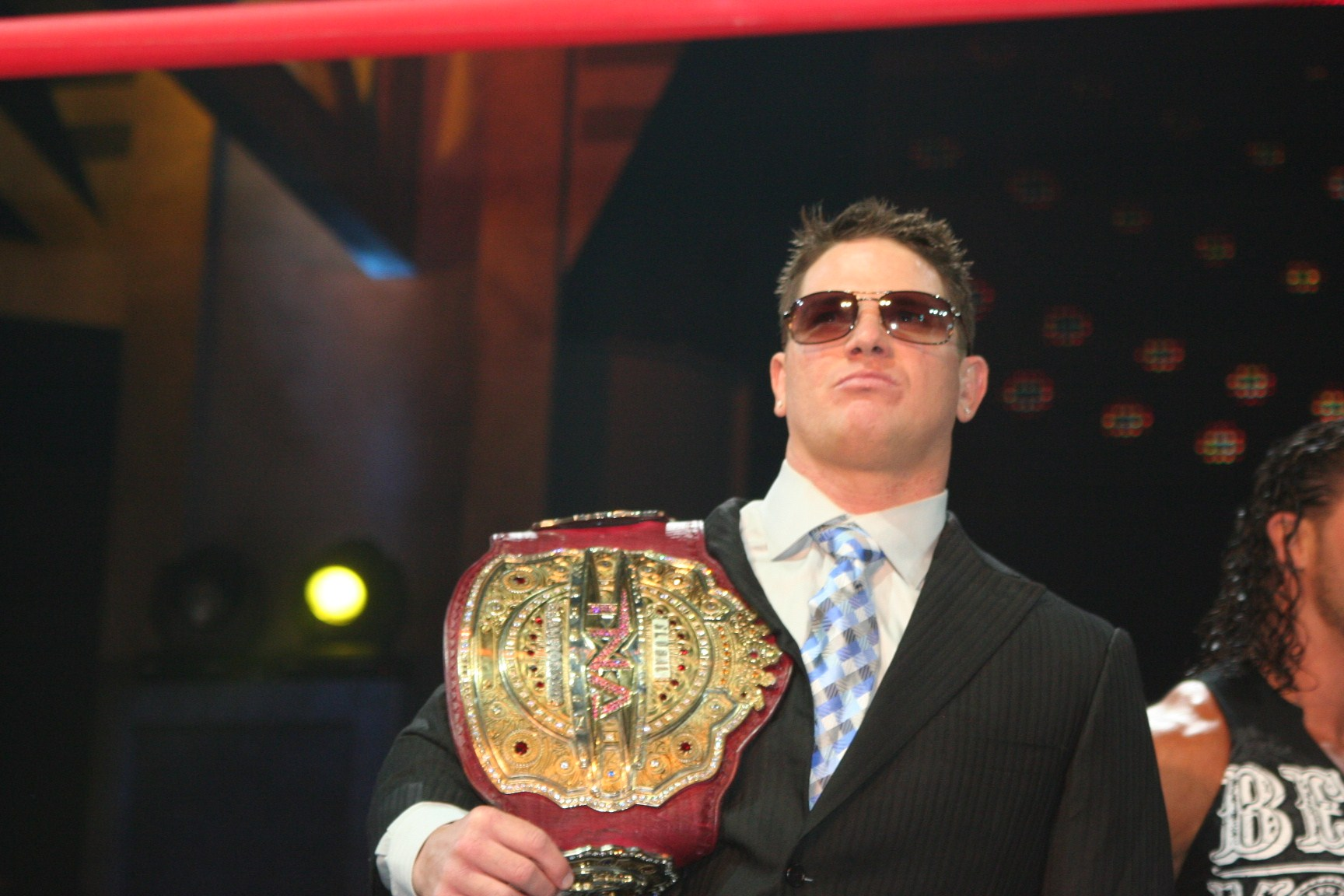
A.J. Styles with the TNA Television Championship belt

- Total Nonstop Action Wrestling
  - TNA World Heavyweight Championship (2 times) – Storm (1) and Roode (1)
  - TNA World Tag Team Championship (1 time) – Storm and Roode
  - TNA X Division Championship (2 times) – Williams (1) and Kazarian (1)
  - TNA Television Championship (1 time) - Styles
  - Bound for Glory Series (2011) – Roode
