= TNA Against All Odds (2011) =

2011 Total Nonstop Action Wrestling pay-per-view event

- Promotional poster featuring Jeff Hardy
- Promotion: Total Nonstop Action Wrestling
- Date: February 13, 2011
- City: Orlando, Florida
- Venue: Impact Zone
- Attendance: 1,100
- Tagline: Is Immortal Truly Forever?

Pay-per-view chronology
← Previous; Genesis	Next → Victory Road

Against All Odds chronology
← Previous; 2010	Next → 2012

The 2011 Against All Odds was a professional wrestling pay-per-view (PPV) event produced by Total Nonstop Action Wrestling (TNA), which took place on February 13, 2011 at Impact Zone in Universal Studios Florida. It was the seventh annual Against All Odds event.

In October 2017, with the launch of the Global Wrestling Network, the event became available to stream on demand.

== Storylines ==
Other on-screen personnel
Commentator	Mike Tenay
Commentator	Taz
Ring announcer	Jeremy Borash
Referee	Rudy Charles
Referee	Mark "Slick" Johnson
Referee	Andrew Thomas
Interviewers	Jeremy Borash

Against All Odds featured nine professional wrestling matches that involved different wrestlers from pre-existing scripted feuds and storylines. Wrestlers portrayed villains, heroes, or less distinguishable characters in the scripted events that built tension and culminated in a wrestling match or series of matches.

== Results ==
No.	Results	Stipulations	Times
1	Robbie E (with Cookie) defeated Jeremy Buck and Max Buck by forfeit	X Division Three-way match to determine the #1 contender for the TNA X Division Championship at same night	00:27
2	Kazarian (c) defeated Robbie E (with Cookie)	Singles match for the TNA X Division Championship	07:11
3	Scott Steiner and Beer Money, Inc. (James Storm and Robert Roode) defeated Immortal (Gunner, Murphy and Rob Terry)	Six-man tag team match	10:13
4	Samoa Joe (with Okato) defeated D'Angelo Dinero by submission	Singles match	08:31
5	Madison Rayne (c) defeated Mickie James	Last Knockout Standing match for the TNA Women's Knockout Championship	08:28
6	Rob Van Dam defeated Matt Hardy	Singles match	13:18
7	Bully Ray defeated Brother Devon	Street Fight	09:24
8	Jeff Jarrett (with Karen Jarrett) defeated Kurt Angle	Singles match (Note: Since Jeff won, Angle had to give Karen away at the Jarretts' wedding vow renewal ceremony on the March 3, 2011 edition of Impact!. Had Angle won, he would have gained full custody of his and Karen's children.)	16:13
9	Jeff Hardy defeated Mr. Anderson (c)	Ladder match for the TNA World Heavyweight Championship	18:15
(c) / – the champion(s) heading into the match

=== Tournament bracket ===
Semifinals
Amazing Red
Chris Sabin
Max Buck
Douglas Williams
Jay Lethal
Jeremy Buck
Brian Kendrick
Robbie E
Suicide

Finals
Max Buck
Jeremy Buck
Robbie E

== See also ==
- 2011 in professional wrestling
