= Immortal (professional wrestling) =

Professional wrestling stable

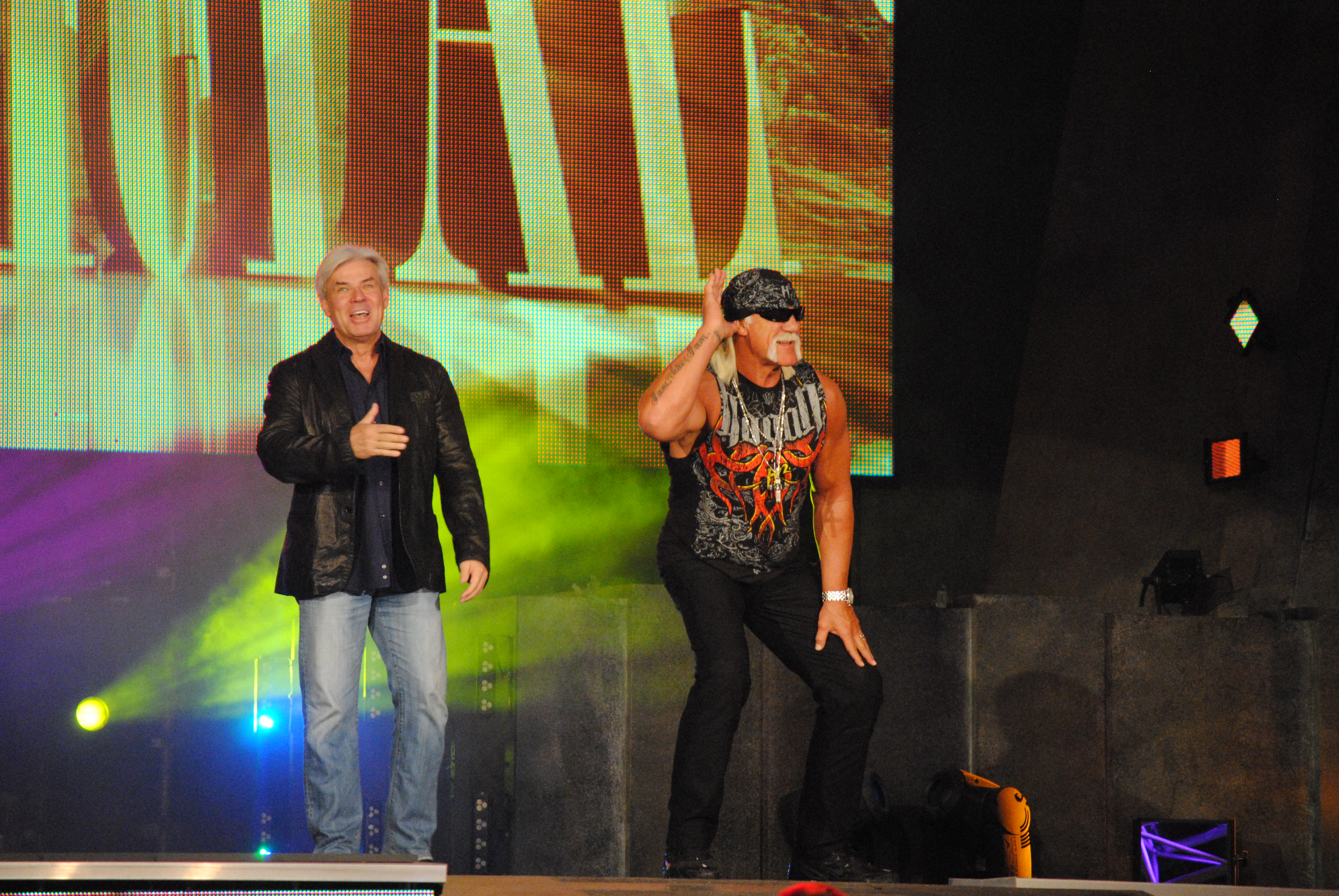
- Co-leaders Eric Bischoff and Hulk Hogan in March 2011

Stable
- Members: See below
- Debut: October 10, 2010
- Disbanded: April 15, 2012
- Years active: 2010–2012

Immortal was a villainous professional wrestling stable in Total Nonstop Action Wrestling (TNA). It originally consisted of leaders Eric Bischoff and Hulk Hogan, as well as Abyss, Jeff Hardy and Jeff Jarrett, and later also came to include Bully Ray, Chris Harris, Gunner, Kurt Angle, Matt Hardy, Mr. Anderson, Murphy, Ric Flair, Rob Terry, Scott Steiner, and Tommy Dreamer as well as the members of the formerly separate stable Fortune. Referee Jackson James and valet Karen Jarrett were also affiliated with the group. Jeff Hardy was a two-time TNA World Heavyweight Champion, while Anderson and Angle were one-time TNA World Heavyweight Champions as members of the stable, and Jarrett was also a one-time holder of the AAA Mega Championship (referring to himself as the "Mexican Heavyweight Champion") in the Mexican promotion AAA. The group's name was derived from Hogan's long-standing nickname "The Immortal".

== History ==
=== Formation (2010) ===
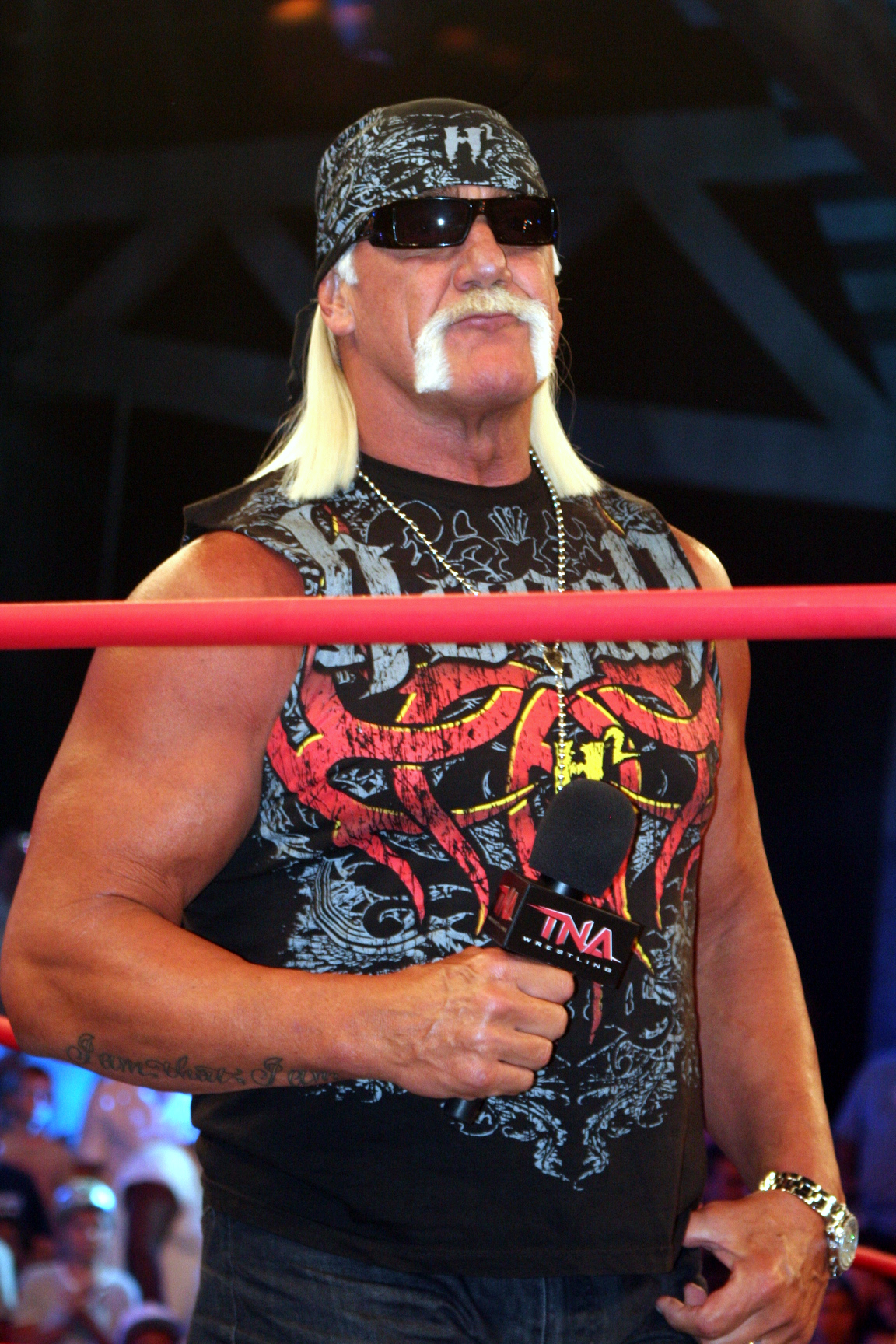
Hulk Hogan in July 2010

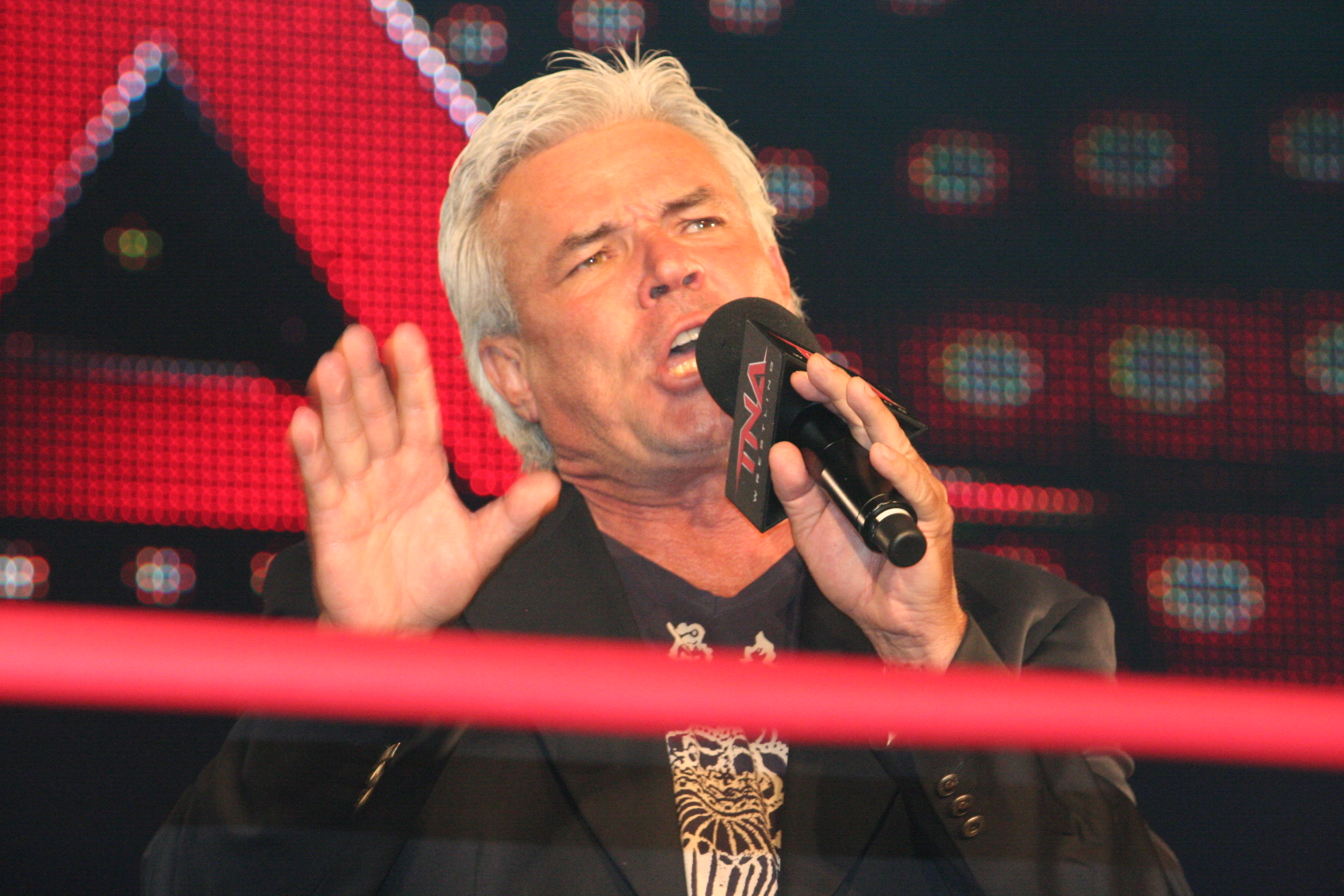
Eric Bischoff at a TNA event in July 2010

Hulk Hogan and Eric Bischoff debuted in Total Nonstop Action Wrestling (TNA) on the January 4, 2010, live edition of Impact!, where they were introduced as business partners of TNA President Dixie Carter. As faces, Hogan and Bischoff exercised control over the company, and attempted to help the company succeed. In February, Hogan began a storyline where he began mentoring Abyss, presenting him with his Hall of Fame ring. Conversely, Ric Flair had also recently debuted in the company and began to mentor A.J. Styles; the two pairs would begin a feud with each other, and later, Hogan, Abyss and fellow babyfaces Jeff Hardy, Rob Van Dam and Mr. Anderson would feud with Styles and Flair's Fortune stable. This continued until the June 17 edition of Impact!, where Abyss turned heel, attacking both Hardy and Anderson and confronting Hogan. Abyss would later go on to explain his actions by claiming that he was being controlled by an entity referred to only as "they"; and that "they" would be coming to TNA soon.

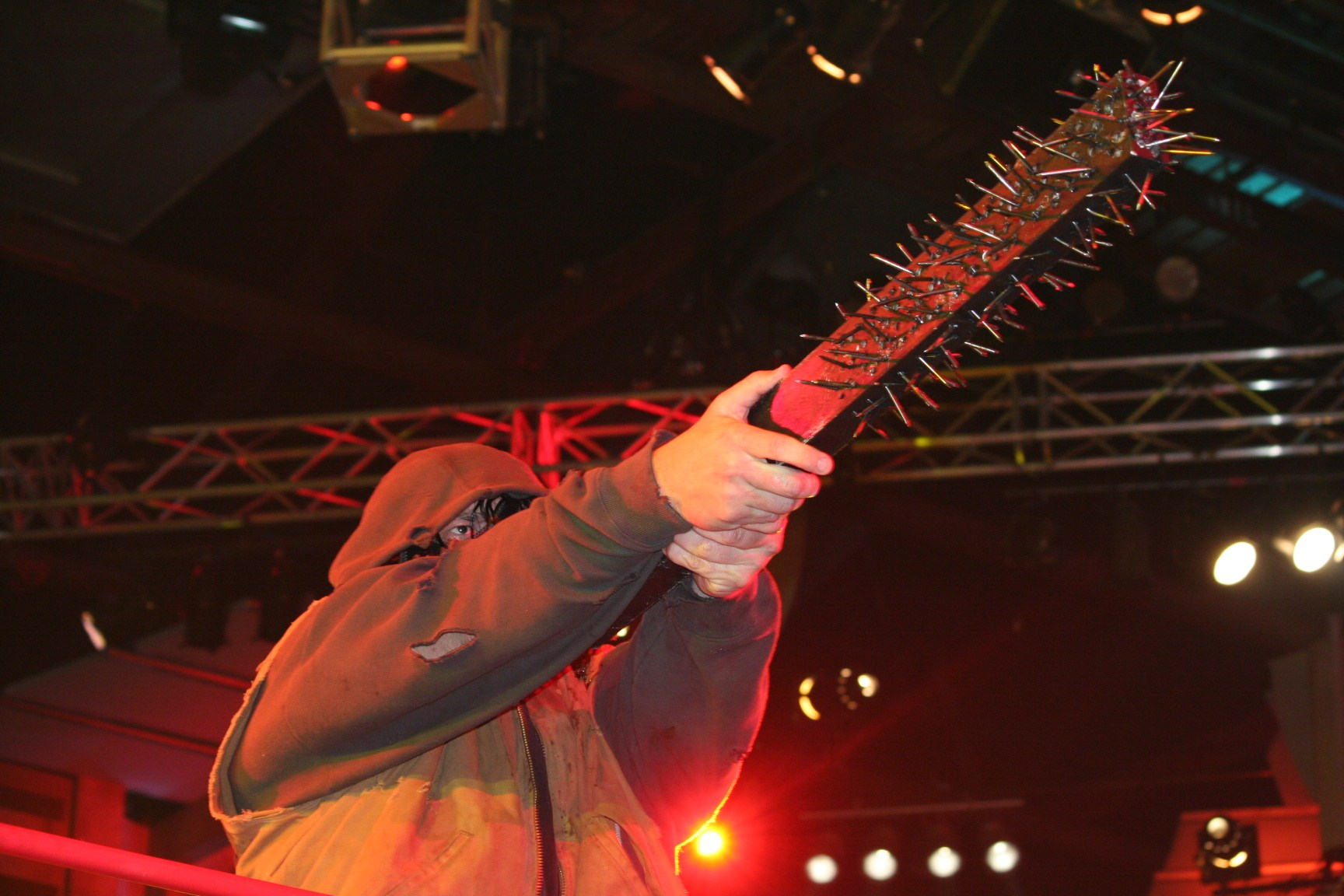
Abyss with "Janice"

Abyss began prophesizing the arrival of "they" on 10.10.10 at Bound for Glory, and attempted to gain the TNA World Heavyweight Championship for "they" by brutally attacking the champion Rob Van Dam with his new weapon of choice, Janice (a 2x4 covered with nails), sidelining him for over a month. As a result of the injury, Bischoff stripped Van Dam of the TNA World Heavyweight Championship and announced a tournament to determine a new champion.

Since Hogan's arrival, Sting had suspected that Hogan and Bischoff were up to something, but only hinted at this with vague accusations of Hogan. To prevent this, he attempted to gain the TNA World Heavyweight Championship and feuded with Rob Van Dam and Jeff Jarrett, while seen as a heel. Eventually Kevin Nash, whose partners in The Band had recently been ousted from TNA, was slowly tuned out by Hogan and Bischoff. He spent a few weeks questioning Hogan and Bischoff, as well as Jarrett for backing them up, and had a rendezvous with Bischoff's secretary, Miss Tessmacher, where presumably he learned some details about their plans. This led to Nash aligning himself with Sting to help his cause on the August 5 edition of Impact!. Nash and Sting feuded with Hogan, Bischoff and Jarrett, accusing them of deceiving everyone and playing the "smoke and mirrors." Having also learned Hogan and Bischoff's plans after a meeting with Miss Tessmacher, D'Angelo Dinero joined Sting and Nash, while Samoa Joe was recruited by Jarrett. Sting, Nash and Dinero challenged Hogan, Jarrett and Joe to a tag team match at Bound for Glory, but with Hogan out due to recovering from back surgery, Bischoff made the match a three–on–two handicap match. At Bound for Glory, Jarrett turned heel by abandoning Joe during their three–on–two handicap match against Sting, Nash and Dinero, costing them the match. The main event of Bound for Glory was a three-way match between Jeff Hardy, Mr. Anderson and Kurt Angle for the TNA World Heavyweight Championship. Near the end of the match, Bischoff came to the ring with a chair and attempted to interfere with the match, but was stopped by the surprise appearance of Hogan. Hogan and Bischoff appeared to have a disagreement, but this was a ruse as they helped Hardy win the match, with all three turning heel. After the match, it was revealed that Abyss, Hogan, Bischoff, Jarrett and Hardy were "they," proving that Sting was right about Hogan and Bischoff the whole time.

=== Dominance (2010–2011) ===
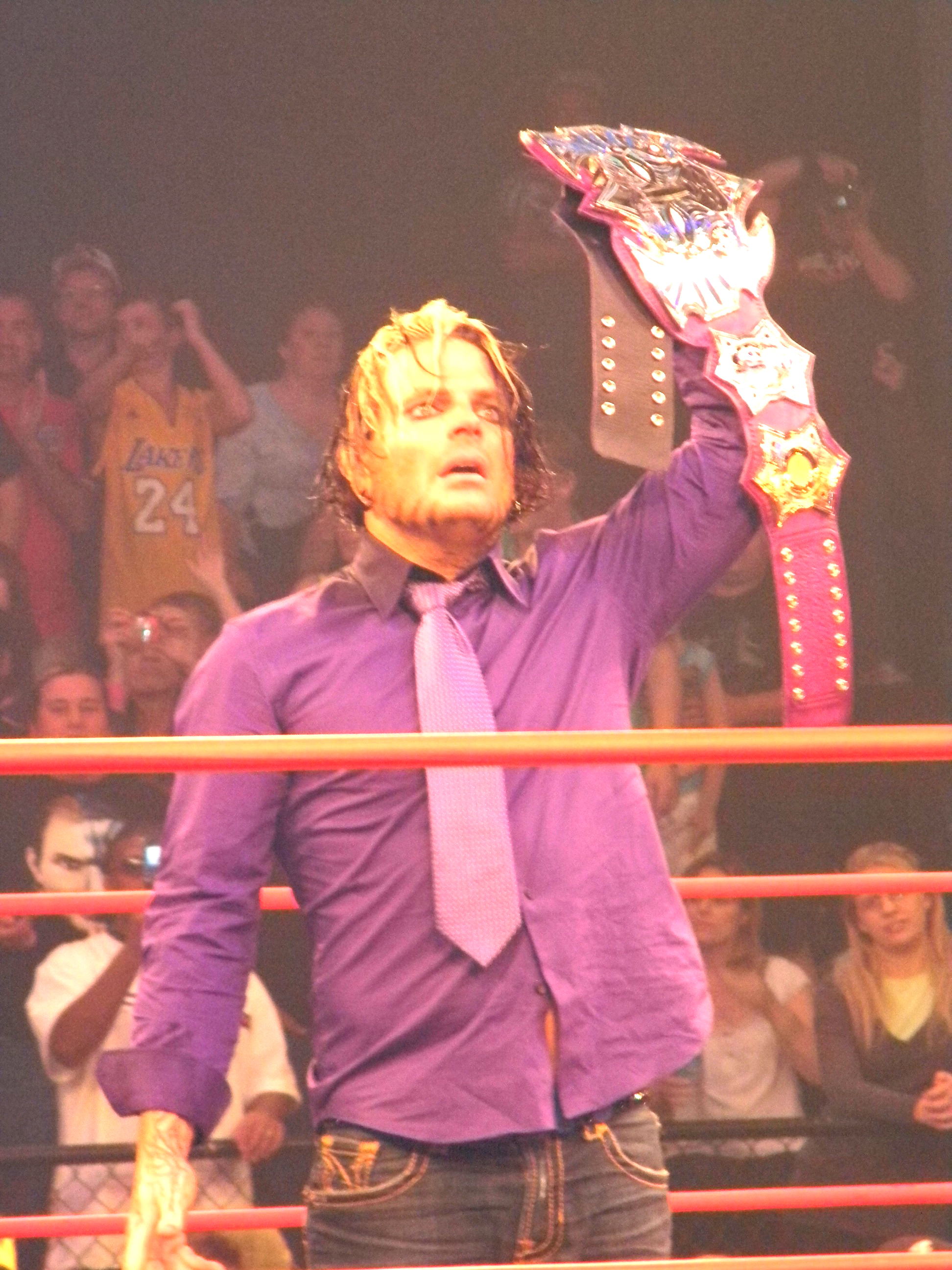
Jeff Hardy with the TNA Immortal Championship belt

On the October 14 edition of Impact!, the group adopted the name "Immortal" after a promo from new TNA World Heavyweight Champion Jeff Hardy, where he stated "We are Immortal, and we live forever." Hogan would once again start using the "Hollywood" moniker he used while a member of the nWo. Bischoff revealed that it had all been an elaborate plan to take complete control of the company. He revealed that he had tricked Carter into signing over the company to him and Hogan a week earlier when Carter thought she signed the paperwork to fire Abyss. Also that night, Immortal formed an alliance with Ric Flair's Fortune. At Turning Point, the alliance of Immortal and Fortune scored a clean sweep when Fortune defeated EV 2.0 in a ten-man tag team match, Abyss defeated D'Angelo Dinero in a lumberjack match, Jeff Jarrett defeated Samoa Joe, and Jeff Hardy retained the TNA World Heavyweight Championship in a match against Matt Morgan. On the following edition of Impact!, Hogan presented Hardy with a new design of the TNA World Heavyweight Championship, which he dubbed the TNA Immortal Championship.

Dixie Carter returned on the November 25 edition of Reaction, informing Hogan and Bischoff that a judge had filed an injunction against the two on her behalf over not having signatory authority, indefinitely suspending Hogan from TNA. Two weeks later, Bischoff declared that the alliance of Immortal and Fortune needed all of the championships in TNA to use as a leverage against Carter. On the December 23 edition of Impact!, Ric Flair hired Rob Terry to take over Morgan's old position as the bodyguard of Immortal and Fortune as a whole.

At Genesis, Fortune member Kazarian defeated Jay Lethal to win the TNA X Division Championship, while James Storm and Robert Roode defeated The Motor City Machine Guns to win the TNA World Tag Team Championship. Abyss also won the TNA Television Championship by defeating Douglas Williams, meaning that the alliance of Immortal and Fortune momentarily held all the male championships in TNA. At the same event, Matt Hardy made his TNA debut as Immortal's surprise opponent for Rob Van Dam and defeated him, thus preventing Van Dam from getting a shot at his brother Jeff's TNA World Heavyweight Championship. In the show's advertised main event, Mr. Anderson defeated Morgan to become the number one contender for the TNA World Heavyweight Championship. Immediately following the match, Bischoff - trying to capitalize on Anderson's fatigue - announced that the title match would take place straight away; Anderson defeated Hardy to become the new TNA World Heavyweight Champion following interference from Morgan, Mick Foley, Matt Hardy, Van Dam and Bischoff.

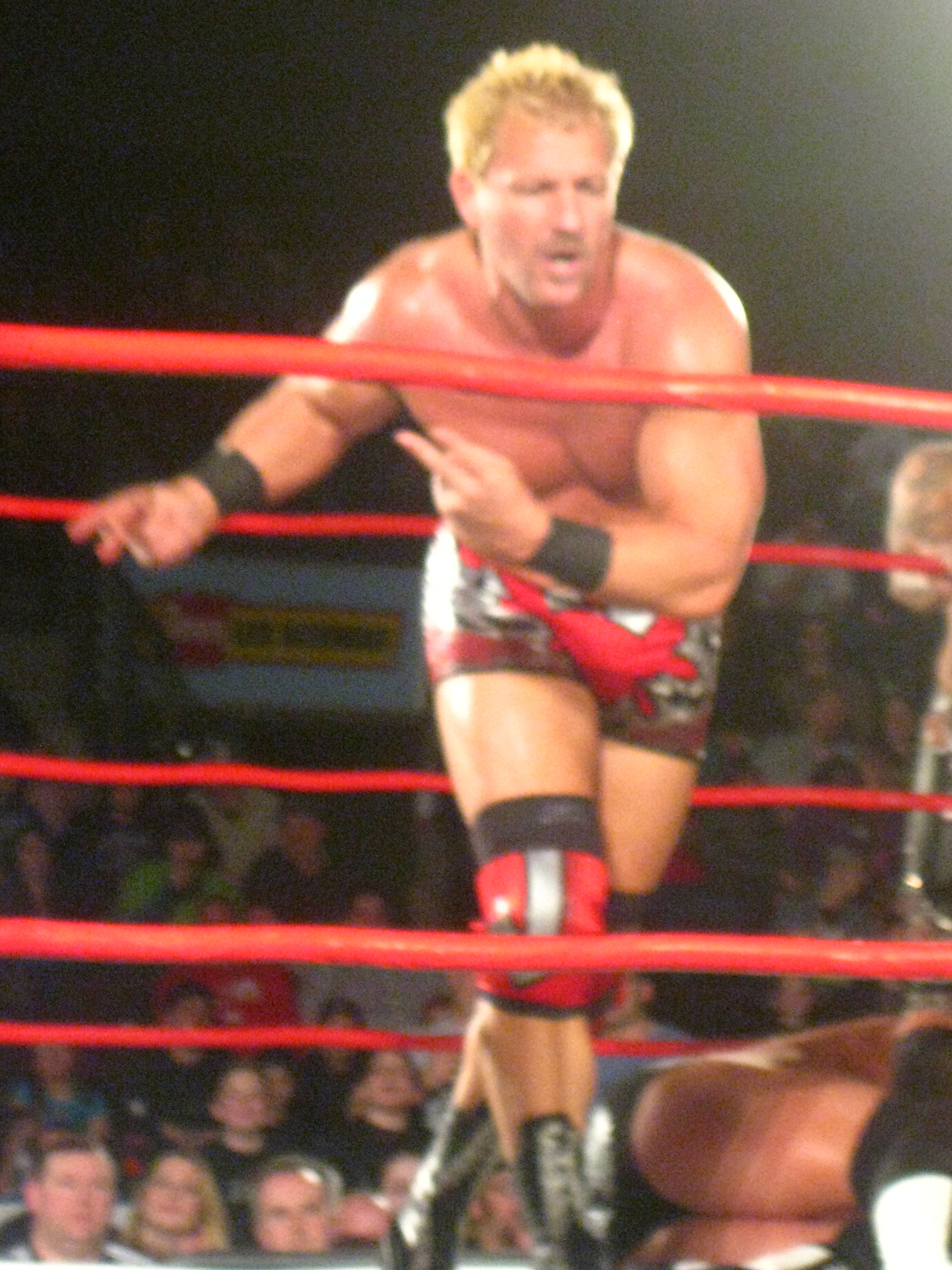
Former AAA Mega Champion Jeff Jarrett

On the February 3, 2011 edition of Impact!, Fortune (without Flair, who was not in attendance at the show due to a torn rotator cuff) turned on Immortal and explained that they were not going to allow Bischoff to destroy TNA like he did World Championship Wrestling (WCW). At Against All Odds, Jeff Hardy defeated Mr. Anderson in a ladder match to regain the TNA World Heavyweight Championship following interference from Immortal's newest member, Hernandez. Flair returned on the February 17 edition of Impact!, where he turned on Fortune and sided with Immortal. On the March 3 edition of Impact!, Hogan returned to TNA and regained control of the company, having won the court battle against Carter. Later in the show, Jeff Hardy lost the TNA World Heavyweight Championship to the returning Sting (who had turned face). Hardy received a rematch for the title at Victory Road, but was defeated in ninety seconds. TNA had made the decision to cut the match short after deeming that Hardy was in no condition to wrestle. On the following edition of Impact!, the rest of Immortal seemingly severed ties with Jeff Hardy, who didn't make an appearance on the show. His spot in the stable was filled by Bully Ray. Later in the show, Immortal's security guard Gunner won the TNA Television Championship, which had been vacated after Abyss had been sidelined with a storyline injury.

At Lockdown, Immortal, represented by Flair, Abyss, Bully Ray and Matt Hardy, was defeated by Fortune members Kazarian, Storm, Roode and Christopher Daniels (who had replaced Styles after he was sidelined with a storyline injury by Bully Ray) in a Lethal Lockdown match.

On the May 5 edition of Impact!, Tommy Dreamer was forced to join Immortal as an associate of Bully Ray after his job in TNA was put in jeopardy. Meanwhile, Murphy was fired and Terry was kicked out of the group by Hogan after Bischoff had forced them to wrestle one another in a "Loser Leaves Immortal" match, which was won by Terry.

On the May 12 edition of Impact!, Matt Hardy revealed the returning Chris Harris as his tag team partner to challenge Roode and Harris' former tag team partner Storm for the TNA World Tag Team Championship. Later in the show, Foley was revealed as the "Network" consultant who had been causing problems for Immortal over the past months, taking control away from Hogan. However, this angle was aborted three weeks later when Foley departed the company. Both Harris and Dreamer also left the company, removing them from the faction. Also in May, Bischoff declared war on the X Division, as part of which, Abyss defeated Kazarian on the May 19 edition of Impact Wrestling to win the TNA X Division Championship. The following week, Gunner lost the TNA Television Championship to Eric Young.

In early May, along with fellow Immortal member Abyss, Jeff Jarrett began making appearances for Mexican promotion AAA as part of a talent exchange program between the two promotions. After losing his long running feud against Kurt Angle, Bischoff forced Jarrett to obey the match stipulations and exiled him to Mexico, where he went on to win the AAA Mega Championship at Triplemanía XIX. On June 12 at Slammiversary IX, Eric Bischoff cost Sting the TNA World Heavyweight Championship in his match with Mr. Anderson. On the June 30 edition of Impact Wrestling, Scott Steiner joined Immortal. The following week, Immortal told Anderson to choose whether he was with them or against them. In the main event of the evening, Anderson turned on Kurt Angle and joined Immortal. On July 10 at Destination X, Abyss lost the X Division Championship to Brian Kendrick, when the rest of the X Division fended off Immortal after their interference. The following day at the tapings of the July 14 edition of Impact Wrestling, Anderson lost the TNA World Heavyweight Championship back to Sting. Throughout the evening, the members of Immortal were attacked by Sting's clown minions, later revealed as Fortune and Kurt Angle, which prevented them from interfering in the match. On the July 28 edition of Impact Wrestling, Bully Ray and Mr. Anderson began having problems with each other, as Ray cost Anderson his steel cage match against Kurt Angle. On August 7 at Hardcore Justice, Hulk Hogan introduced a steel chair into the World title match between champion Sting and challenger Kurt Angle. Angle disarmed Hogan, but then used the chair on Sting to win the TNA World Heavyweight Championship. After the match, Angle challenged the dumbfounded Hogan to come and take the belt from him, suggesting that this was not what he had planned as the outcome of the match. The following week, Angle claimed his reasons for his actions at Hardcore Justice was that he received inside information that Dixie Carter was aware of Jeff Jarrett's affair with his ex-wife Karen. He vowed to destroy the young talent of TNA and to never let Dixie regain control of her company.

=== Downfall (2011–2012) ===
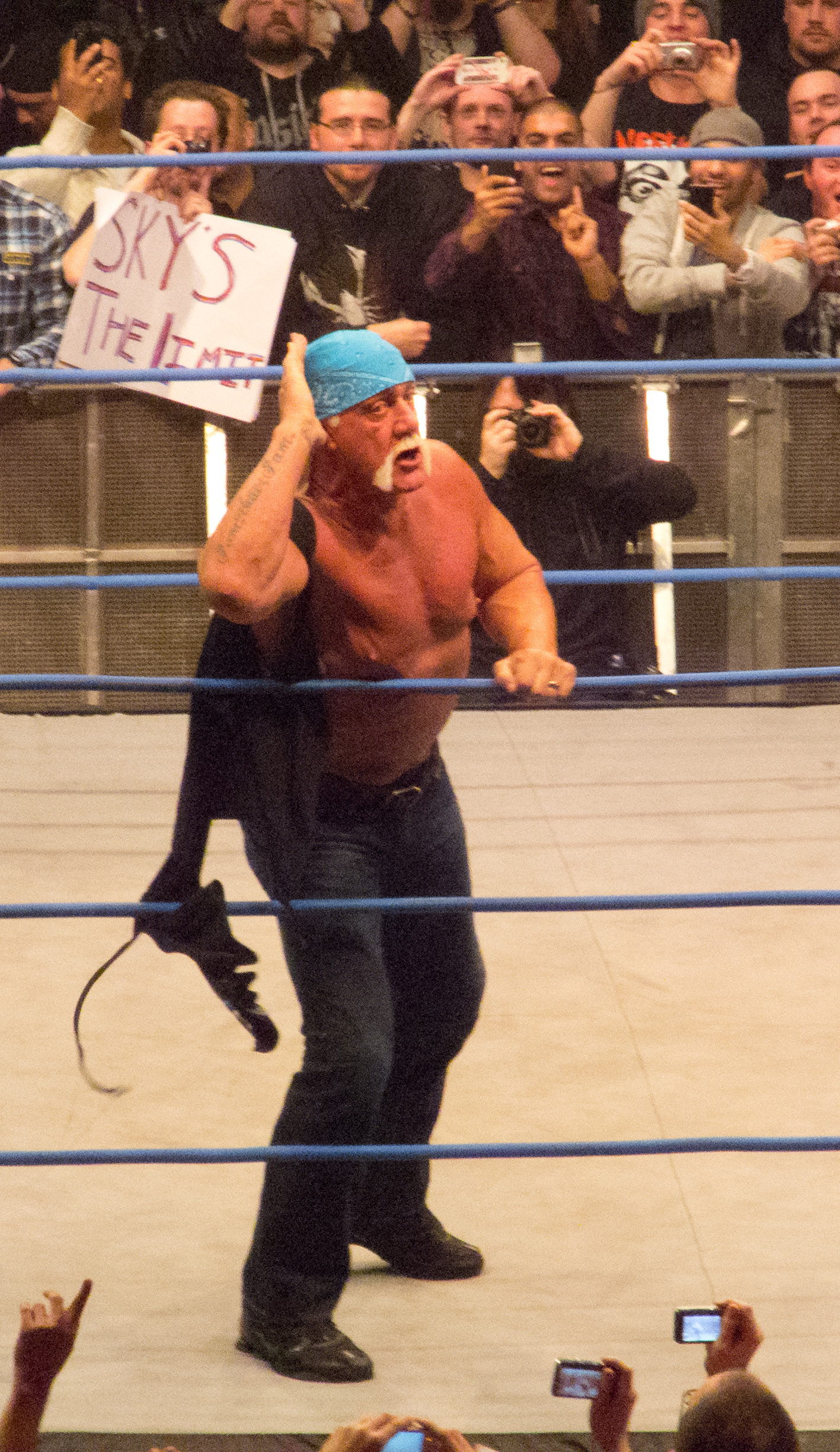
Hulk Hogan in 2012

On the following edition of Impact Wrestling, the rest of Immortal turned on Anderson and kicked him out of the group. On August 20, 2011, Matt Hardy, who was already suspended from TNA, was fired from the promotion due to him being arrested for driving while intoxicated, severing his connection with Immortal. On the October 6 edition of Impact Wrestling, Sting exposed via hidden footage that Hogan was feigning retirement all along, and was shown openly mocking the fans in Knoxville, Tennessee. In a fit of rage, Hogan accepted Sting's challenge for a match at Bound for Glory and added that should Sting win, he would surrender control of TNA back to Dixie Carter. After weeks of dissension, Abyss turned on Immortal on the October 13 edition of Impact Wrestling, and was afterwards beaten down by his former stablemates. On October 16 at Bound for Glory, Sting defeated Hogan, handing TNA back to Carter. After the match, Hogan turned face by attacking the rest of Immortal as they were beating down Sting. In the main event of the evening, Kurt Angle defeated Bobby Roode to retain the TNA World Heavyweight Championship. On the following edition of Impact Wrestling, Angle lost the TNA World Heavyweight Championship to James Storm in a match booked by new authority figure, Sting. On the December 15 edition of Impact Wrestling, Sting fired both Jeff and Karen Jarrett, in storyline, as per stipulation of a match at Final Resolution, where Hardy had defeated Jarrett in a steel cage match, which had happened after Storm defeated Angle in a match. On January 8, 2012, at Genesis, Bully Ray was defeated by Abyss in a Monster's Ball match; as per stipulation, Abyss did not have to rejoin Immortal, while earlier in the night Gunner defeated Rob Van Dam and Angle defeated Storm in a rematch. At Against All Odds, with Eric Bischoff in his corner, Gunner would defeat Garett Bischoff in a singles match with Hulk Hogan in Garett's corner, while in the main event Ray failed to win the TNA World Heavyweight Championship in a four-way match also involving Storm, Hardy, and the champion Roode. At Victory Road, Storm defeated Ray in a number one contender's match, while Kurt Angle defeated Jeff Hardy. In March 2012, Scott Steiner was released from TNA, thus removing him from Immortal. On April 15 at Lockdown, Eric Bischoff was, in storyline, forced to leave TNA, after his five-man team was defeated by a team led by Garett Bischoff in the annual Lethal Lockdown match while Angle was defeated by Hardy in a Steel Cage match, effectively dissolving Immortal. The final remnants of Immortal went their own ways, with Ric Flair continuing to manage Gunner after the group's dissolution until his release from TNA in May.

== Members ==
Member	Date
Abyss	October 10, 2010 – October 13, 2011
Eric Bischoff (co-leader)	October 10, 2010 – April 15, 2012
Hulk Hogan (co-leader)	October 10, 2010 – October 16, 2011
Jeff Hardy	October 10, 2010 – March 17, 2011
Jeff Jarrett	October 10, 2010 – December 15, 2011
Fortune (partnership)	October 14, 2010 - February 3, 2011
Gunner	October 21, 2010 – April 15, 2012
Murphy	October 21, 2010 - May 5, 2011
Jackson James (referee)	November 7, 2010 – October 16, 2011
Rob Terry	February 3, 2011 – May 5, 2011
Matt Hardy	January 9, 2011 – August 20, 2011
Karen Jarrett (valet)	January 13, 2011 – December 15, 2011
Ric Flair	February 17, 2011 – April 15, 2012
Bully Ray	March 17, 2011 – April 15, 2012
Tommy Dreamer	May 5, 2011 – June 11, 2011
Chris Harris	May 12, 2011 – May 15, 2011
Scott Steiner	June 30, 2011 – March 1, 2012
Mr. Anderson	July 7, 2011 – August 11, 2011
Kurt Angle	August 7, 2011 – April 15, 2012

== Championships and accomplishments ==
- AAA
  - AAA Mega Championship (1 time) – Jeff Jarrett
- Total Nonstop Action Wrestling
  - TNA Television Championship (3 times) – A.J. Styles (1), Gunner (1) and Abyss (1)
  - TNA World Heavyweight Championship (5 times) – Jeff Hardy (2), Mr. Anderson (1), Kurt Angle (1) and Bobby Roode (1)
  - TNA World Tag Team Championship (1 time) – Beer Money, Inc. (Bobby Roode and James Storm) (1)
  - TNA X Division Championship (2 times) – Kazarian (1) and Abyss (1)
  - TNA Knockouts Tag Team Championship (1 time) – Mexican America (Rosita and Sarita)
