= No Surrender (2011) =

2011 Total Nonstop Action Wrestling pay-per-view event

- Promotional poster featuring TNA wrestlers
- Promotion: Total Nonstop Action Wrestling
- Date: September 11, 2011
- City: Orlando, Florida
- Venue: Impact Zone
- Attendance: 1,100
- Tagline: "12 Men. One Shot at Glory"

Pay-per-view chronology
← Previous; Hardcore Justice	Next → Bound for Glory

No Surrender chronology
← Previous; 2010	Next → 2012

The 2011 No Surrender was a professional wrestling pay-per-view event produced by Total Nonstop Action Wrestling (TNA) that took place on September 11, 2011, at the Impact Wrestling Zone in Orlando, Florida. It was the seventh annual No Surrender chronology, and notably featured the final matches of the 2011 edition of the Bound for Glory Series. At the beginning of the event, there was a short memorial to 9/11 victims.

In October 2017, with the launch of the Global Wrestling Network, the event became available to stream on demand.

== Storylines ==
Other on-screen personnel
Commentators	Mike Tenay
Commentators	Taz
Ring announcer	Jeremy Borash
Referees	Rudy Charles
Referees	Mark "Slick" Johnson
Referees	Andrew Thomas
Interviewer	Jeremy Borash

No Surrender featured nine professional wrestling matches that involved different wrestlers from pre-existing scripted feuds and storylines. Wrestlers portrayed villains, heroes, or less distinguishable characters in the scripted events that built tension and culminated in a wrestling match or series of matches.

Going into the night the leaders were as follows: Bully Ray (49), Bobby Roode (42), Gunner (42), and James Storm (40). Bully Ray simply needed to win a match via pinfall or submission in order to continue in the series uncontested. The other three in the series would require a submission victory to pass Bully Ray if he lost.

Bully Ray defeated James Storm by disqualification and brought him to 52 pts requiring Bobby Roode or Gunner to win by submission in order to tie with Bully Ray and stay alive in the series. The battle between Bobby Roode and Gunner resulted in Roode getting the submission victory and bringing him to 52 pts tying with Bully Ray.

After Roode’s win Eric Bischoff dictated there will be a winner in the Bound for Glory Series tonight and created a match between Bobby Roode and Bully Ray. In the newly added match, Bobby Roode defeated Bully Ray making him the #1 Contender for the TNA World Heavyweight Championship at Bound for Glory in Philadelphia.

== Results ==
No.	Results	Stipulations	Times
1	Jesse Sorensen defeated Kid Kash	Singles match to determine the #1 contender to the TNA X Division Championship	07:55
2	Bully Ray defeated James Storm by disqualification	Singles match in the Bound for Glory Series	11:48
3	Winter defeated Mickie James (c)	Singles match for the TNA Women's Knockout Championship	08:38
4	Mexican America (Anarquia and Hernandez) (c) defeated D'Angelo Dinero and Devon	Tag team match for the TNA World Tag Team Championship	09:45
5	Matt Morgan defeated Samoa Joe	Singles match	11:35
6	Bobby Roode defeated Gunner by submission	Singles match in the Bound for Glory Series	11:58
7	Austin Aries defeated Brian Kendrick (c)	Singles match for the TNA X Division Championship	13:24
8	Bobby Roode defeated Bully Ray	Final match in the Bound for Glory Series	12:30
9	Kurt Angle (c) defeated Mr. Anderson and Sting	Three-way match for the TNA World Heavyweight Championship	15:28
(c) / – the champion(s) heading into the match

== See also ==
- 2011 in professional wrestling
