= Hardcore Justice (2011) =

2011 Total Nonstop Action Wrestling pay-per-view event

- Promotional poster featuring Abyss
- Promotion: Total Nonstop Action Wrestling
- Date: August 7, 2011
- City: Orlando, Florida
- Venue: Impact Zone
- Attendance: 1,100

Pay-per-view chronology
← Previous; Destination X	Next → No Surrender

Hardcore Justice chronology
← Previous; 2010	Next → 2012

The 2011 Hardcore Justice was a professional wrestling pay-per-view (PPV) event produced by Total Nonstop Action Wrestling (TNA) promotion, which took place on August 7, 2011 at the Impact Wrestling Zone in Orlando, Florida. It was the seventh event under the Hardcore Justice chronology.

In October 2017, with the launch of the Global Wrestling Network, the event became available to stream on demand.

== Storylines ==
Other on-screen personnel
Commentators	Mike Tenay
Commentators	Taz
Ring announcers	Jeremy Borash
Ring announcers	Christy Hemme
Referees	Jackson James
Referees	Earl Hebner
Referees	Brian Hebner
Interviewer	Jeremy Borash

Hardcore Justice featured nine professional wrestling matches that involved different wrestlers from pre-existing scripted feuds and storylines. Wrestlers portrayed villains, heroes, or less distinguishable characters in the scripted events that built tension and culminated in a wrestling match or series of matches.

On the May 19 episode of TNA's television program Impact Wrestling, Kurt Angle announced that Mick Foley, representing "The Network", would reward a shot at the TNA World Heavyweight Championship depending on who won the match between him and Jeff Jarrett at the TNA Slammiversary IX PPV event. Angle went on to win the match and on the July 14 episode of Impact Wrestling, it was announced that the title shot would take place at Hardcore Justice against whoever won a TNA World Heavyweight Championship bout between then-champion Mr. Anderson and Sting on the same episode. Sting went on to win the title from Anderson, thus making it Sting defending the title against Angle at Hardcore Justice. Angle confronted Sting, proclaiming that at Hardcore Justice, he would defeat him for the first time without outside interference. Sting, however, was too busy with his war with Immortal, and Angle was side-tracked with Immortal as well, engaging in battle against his former rival Mr. Anderson. Sting set up a steel cage match between Angle and Anderson, after he announced he was given full booking power by The Network. Sting also added the stipulation that Fortune were to be around ringside to make sure Immortal didn't interfere in the match. Sting then revealed he made up being the Network Executive all the time, and then released a raven in Eric Bischoff's office to keep him there and to stop him from stopping the match. Angle went on to win the match against Anderson after Bully Ray and Anderson got into an argument regarding a steel chair towards the end of the bout.

Hardcore Justice is the second-to-last pay-per-view before Bound for Glory, meaning that the wins and losses in the Bound for Glory series were more important than ever before. So, two Bound for Glory Series matches were scheduled for the card. The first announced bout would be between the currently undefeated BFG Series leader Crimson against the ring veteran and BFG Series number two Rob Van Dam. The other match would be between Devon and "The Pope" D'Angelo Dinero, which was considerably more personal than the Crimson/Van Dam dynamic. The Pope befriended Devon's wife and kids during episodes of TNA's secondary show Xplosion, and has desperately tried to earn Devon's trust. Devon has refused to trust Dinero, even after The Pope gave Devon a BFG Series win in a tag team match. Devon's kids keep hanging out with Dinero, despite protest from Devon, who has demanded that Dinero leave his family alone.

Mexican America (Anarquia and Hernandez) defeated The British Invasion (Douglas Williams and Magnus) at Midsummer's Nightmare to earn the right to face Beer Money, Inc. (Bobby Roode and James Storm) for the TNA World Tag Team Championship at Hardcore Justice. Beer Money confronted Mexican America and made fun of them. The following week, Beer Money was too busy engaging in the Bound for Glory Series (in the case of Roode) and helping Sting fight Immortal by posing as clowns with black baseball bats (Storm) with the rest of Fortune. The week after that, Beer Money, as a part of Fortune, were lumberjacks in the steel cage match between Mr. Anderson and Kurt Angle. Immortal, as well as Mexican America, charged the ring, resulting in a brawl between Fortune, Immortal, and Mexican America.

At Destination X, Brian Kendrick defeated Abyss to win the TNA X Division Championship and save the division from falling into obscurity. At that same pay-per-view, Alex Shelley won an Ultimate X match to earn the right to face Kendrick for the title. On Impact, Kendrick and Shelley battled in a match with the title on the line. Austin Aries interfered in the match by hitting Shelley in the head with the title belt to allow Kendrick to pick up the victory. The following week, Kendrick and Shelley called Aries out to the ring. They declared that there would be a three way match between the three of them at Hardcore Justice with the title on the line. Abyss, however, revealed that he would be getting a title shot against Kendrick that very night, and he would destroy the X Division Championship this time after winning it. Sting, posing as the Network Executive, gave Abyss his match, but decided to make it an Ultimate X match. Kendrick retained the title, and the three way at Hardcore Justice was solidified.

Fortune and Immortal's feud has continued in the form of Fortune aligning with Sting to help fight Immortal. Immortal interfered in Mr. Anderson's title match against Sting to ensure Anderson won the title. Sting was given a rematch at a night dubbed Midsummer's Nightmare, the Impact after Destination X. Fortune posed as clowns to attack various members of Immortal so they wouldn't be able to interfere in the title match that occurred that night, which would ensure Anderson retaining the belt. Fortune was then instructed by Sting to guard the cage during the Angle/Anderson match that occurred on Impact so that Immortal couldn't interfere in that bout either. Fortune was swarmed by Immortal and Mexican America during the match.

In the weeks leading up to Destination X, Winter revealed that she is the next in line to face Mickie James for her TNA Women's Knockout Championship, and she would be getting her title shot at Hardcore Justice.

On August 5, Impact Wrestling's official Facebook page announced TnT (Ms. Tessmacher and Tara) defending the TNA Knockouts Tag Team Championship against the former champions - Mexican America (Rosita and Sarita).

== Results ==
No.	Results	Stipulations	Times
1	Brian Kendrick (c) defeated Alex Shelley and Austin Aries	Three-way match for the TNA X Division Championship	13:10
2	TnT (Ms. Tessmacher and Tara) (c) defeated Mexican America (Rosita and Sarita) (with Anarquia and Hernandez)	Tag team match for the TNA Knockouts Tag Team Championship	07:08
3	D'Angelo Dinero defeated Devon	Singles match in the Bound for Glory Series	09:33
4	Winter (with Angelina Love) defeated Mickie James (c)	Singles match for the TNA Women's Knockout Championship	08:58
5	Crimson defeated Rob Van Dam (with Jerry Lynn) by disqualification	Singles match in the Bound for Glory Series	08:40
6	Fortune (A.J. Styles, Christopher Daniels, and Kazarian) defeated Immortal (Abyss, Gunner, and Scott Steiner)	Six-man tag team match	14:42
7	Bully Ray defeated Mr. Anderson	Singles match	10:04
8	Beer Money, Inc. (c) (Bobby Roode and James Storm) defeated Mexican America (Anarquia and Hernandez)	Tag team match for the TNA World Tag Team Championship	10:41
9	Kurt Angle defeated Sting (c)	Singles match for the TNA World Heavyweight Championship	15:22
(c) / – the champion(s) heading into the match
