= TNA Genesis (2011) =

2011 Total Nonstop Action Wrestling pay-per-view event

Genesis (2011)
- Promotional poster featuring Kurt Angle
- Promotion: Total Nonstop Action Wrestling
- Date: January 9, 2011
- City: Orlando, Florida
- Venue: Impact Zone
- Attendance: 1,100
- Tagline: Kurt Angle is back. And he's bringing hell with him!

Pay-per-view chronology
← Previous; Final Resolution	Next → Against All Odds

Genesis chronology
← Previous; 2010	Next → 2012

The 2011 Genesis was a professional wrestling pay-per-view (PPV) event produced by Total Nonstop Action Wrestling (TNA), that took place on January 9, 2011, at the Impact Zone in Universal Studios Florida. It was the sixth event under the Genesis chronology and the first event of the 2011 TNA PPV schedule.

In October 2017, with the launch of the Global Wrestling Network, the event became available to stream on demand. It would later be available on Impact Plus in May 2019.

== Storylines ==
Other on-screen personnel
Commentator	Mike Tenay
Commentator	Taz
Ring announcer	Jeremy Borash
Referee	Earl Hebner
Referee	Jackson James
Referee	Andrew Thomas
Interviewers	Jeremy Borash

Genesis featured nine professional wrestling matches that involved different wrestlers from pre-existing scripted feuds and storylines. Wrestlers portrayed villains, heroes, or less distinguishable characters in the scripted events that built tension and culminated in a wrestling match or series of matches.

== Results ==
No.	Results	Stipulations	Times
1	Kazarian defeated Jay Lethal (c)	Singles match for the TNA X Division Championship	11:40
2	Madison Rayne (c) defeated Mickie James	Singles match for the TNA Women's Knockout Championship	10:30
3	Beer Money, Inc. (James Storm and Robert Roode) defeated The Motor City Machine Guns (c) (Alex Shelley and Chris Sabin)	Tag team match for the TNA World Tag Team Championship	18:00
4	Bully Ray defeated Brother Devon by disqualification	Singles match	8:50
5	Abyss defeated Douglas Williams (c)	Singles match for the TNA Television Championship	9:45
6	Matt Hardy defeated Rob Van Dam	Singles match	11:55
7	Jeff Jarrett vs. Kurt Angle ended in a no contest	Double J Double M A "Exhibition"	4:30
8	Mr. Anderson defeated Matt Morgan	Singles match	15:25
9	Mr. Anderson defeated Jeff Hardy (c)	Singles match for the TNA World Heavyweight Championship	9:05
(c) / – the champion(s) heading into the match
