= Bobby Roode =

Canadian professional wrestler (born 1976)

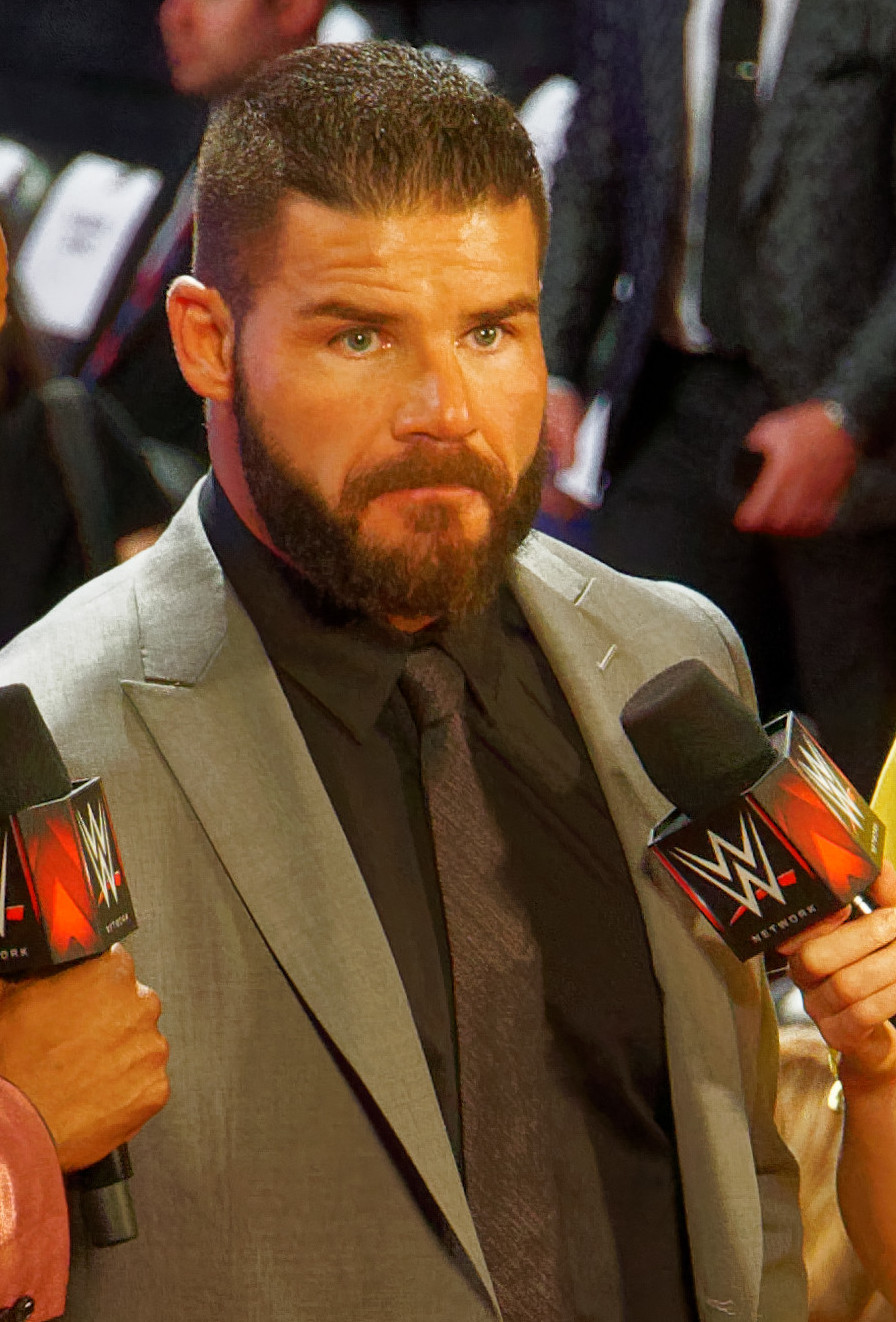
- Roode in 2018

Personal information
- Born: Robert Francis Roode Jr. May 11, 1976 (age 50) Peterborough, Ontario, Canada
- Spouse: Tracey Roode (m. 1995)
- Children: 3

Professional wrestling career
- Ring name(s): Bobby Roode; Bobby Rude; Lee Awesome; Robert Roode
- Billed height: 6 ft 1 in (1.85 m)
- Billed weight: 235 lb (107 kg)
- Billed from: Toronto, Ontario, Canada
- Trained by: Scott D'Amore; Shane Sewell; Val Venis
- Debut: June 19, 1998
- Retired: February 22, 2024

Robert Francis Roode Jr. (born May 11, 1976) is a Canadian retired professional wrestler. He is signed to WWE, where he works as a producer.

Widely regarded as one of the greatest TNA wrestlers of all time, Roode is best known for his twelve-year tenure with the company. After debuting for TNA as part of Team Canada in 2004, he won the NWA World Tag Team Championship with Eric Young. Following the team's breakup, embarked on a singles run before forming a tag team with James Storm as Beer Money, Inc. Together with Storm, he is a six-time TNA World Tag Team Champion and they are the longest reigning champions in TNA history. Roode eventually became a two-time TNA World Heavyweight Champion, with his first reign being the second longest reign in the company's history at 256 days, only behind Josh Alexander's reign at 335 days. In his later years with the company, Roode also won the World Tag Team Championship with Austin Aries and was a one-time TNA King of the Mountain Champion.

In 2016, he began his WWE career in NXT, where he was a one-time NXT Champion prior to his main roster call-up. Roode debuted on SmackDown in August 2017, winning the United States Championship in January 2018, his first championship on the main roster, and he won the Raw Tag Team Championship with partner Chad Gable that December. He also has held the Raw and SmackDown Tag Team Championships once each with Dolph Ziggler. Overall, Roode is a three-time world champion in professional wrestling.

== Professional wrestling career ==
=== Independent promotions (1998–2004) ===
Roode grew up around an athletic environment playing minor hockey in Peterborough and attended Kenner Collegiate Vocational Institution. He was also a stick boy for the OHL's Peterborough Petes and witnessed players such as future NHLers Mike Ricci, Tie Domi, and Chris Pronger train for the local major junior team.

Roode was trained in his hometown of Peterborough, Ontario by fellow Ontarians Shane Sewell and Sean Morley. He completed his training after a year and wrestled his debut match in June 1998 as "Total" Lee Awesome against Pete Rock. He then went on to work for various Canadian independent promotions, as well as making appearances for the Puerto Rican promotion, World Wrestling Council (WWC). He also went on to work a series of dark matches for World Wrestling Federation/World Wrestling Entertainment (WWF/WWE) between 1998 and 2004 before he was signed by Total Nonstop Action Wrestling (TNA).

Roode began working for Real Action Wrestling in 2001, where he formed a villainous stable known as The Kardinal Sinners along with Kingman and Mike Hughes as well as part-time members Wildman Gary Williams and The Acadian Giant. Roode later rejoined them as a part of their Wrestling Reality show to be aired on The Fight Network, but he was not seen on these episodes due to contractual obligations with TNA.

While in TNA, Roode also wrestled for BSE Pro in Ontario, Border City Wrestling in Windsor, Ontario and at NWA Shockwave in New Jersey. On March 18, 2006, he won the NWA Shockwave Internet Championship from Josh Daniels at an NWAS/New York Wrestling Connection cross-promotional event. Eight days later on March 26, Roode won the vacant NWA Shockwave Heavyweight Championship at Disturbing the Peace 2006 in a four-way match. Roode held both titles until May 21, when he dropped the Internet title and successfully defended the Heavyweight title against Slyck Wagner Brown. Due to the restarting of the company, all of the NWA Cyberspace championships were vacated, including Roode's Heavyweight title.

Roode performed for the WWF/WWE numerous times between 2001 and 2004. He usually appeared in secondary television programs like Jakked/Metal, Sunday Night Heat or Velocity. He also wrestled dark matches before Raw and SmackDown.

=== Total Nonstop Action Wrestling (2004–2016) ===
==== Team Canada (2004–2006) ====
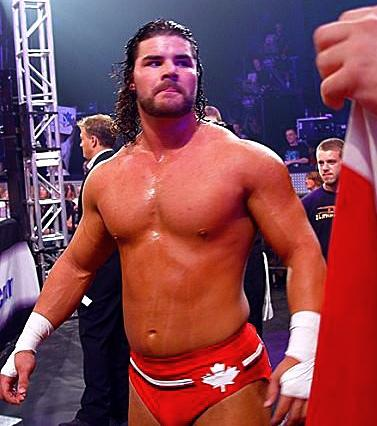
Roode in 2005 as a member of Team Canada

In May 2004, Roode was brought into Total Nonstop Action Wrestling (TNA) by Scott D'Amore, the owner of Border City Wrestling, a Canadian independent promotion for which Roode had worked on occasion. Roode debuted in TNA as part of the Team Canada stable, and took part in the World X-Cup, which was won by Team USA. Team Canada went on to feud with 3Live Kru and America's Most Wanted. on the October 12, 2004 episode of Impact, Team Canada (Roode and Eric Young) defeated Christopher Daniels (4) and James Storm to win the NWA World Tag Team Championship. at Victory Road, Team Canada lost the titles to 3Live Kru (B.G. James and Konnan). As the biggest and most powerful member of Team Canada at the time, Roode acted as the enforcer of the group, a role popularised by Arn Anderson. In early 2006, recognizing his comparisons to Anderson, he made the request that he be called "The Canadian Enforcer" from that point onward, and began coming to the ring in sequined robes reminiscent of the flashy style popularized by the Four Horsemen and Rick Rude in the late 1980s.

Roode began a feud with Dustin Rhodes in early 2005, losing to him at April's Lockdown in a best of three falls steel cage match, with the third fall a blindfold match. At Hard Justice, Roode competed in a Twenty-Man Gauntlet for the Gold which was won by Abyss. After that Roode feuded with Lance Hoyt, who he defeated at Slammiversary and at No Surrender with Team Canada, Hoyt teaming with The Naturals. At Sacrifice, Team Canada defeated America's Most Wanted and The Naturals in an Eight-man tag team match. After defeating Jeff Hardy at Unbreakable in September, Roode and the remainder of Team Canada resumed their feud with 3Live Kru. At Bound for Glory, Team Canada defeated 3Live Kru. at Genesis (2005), Team Canada lost to 3Live Kru in a 6-Sided Stick Fight with Kip James as special guest referee and at Turning Point Team Canada defeated 4Live Kru (B.G. James, Kip James, Konnan and Ron Killings) in an Eight-man tag team match.

At Final Resolution, Roode began a singles career, while still being linked to Team Canada, by defeating Ron Killings. Five months later, on the June 29 episode of TNA Impact!, TNA Management Director Jim Cornette forced the breakup of Team Canada. However, on the July 6 episode of Impact!, Cornette gave Team Canada one more chance to stay together but only if they could win a match a week later against Jay Lethal, Rhino and Team 3D (Brother Ray and Brother Devon). On the July 13 episode of Impact!, Team Canada lost the match when Jay Lethal pinned A-1, disbanding Team Canada once and for all.

==== Robert Roode Inc. (2006–2008) ====
After the breakup of Team Canada, Roode began referring to himself as "TNA's hottest free agent". Vignettes began playing with various TNA managers such as Simon Diamond, Jim Mitchell, and Shane Douglas putting over the idea of Roode being an NWA World Heavyweight Championship contender and stating their interest in becoming his manager, but he eventually dismissed them. Having chosen not to work with a current TNA manager, segments began airing with Roode interviewing managers for the position; Bobby "The Brain" Heenan on September 7, Col. Robert Parker on September 14, and Sherri Martel on September 21. He revealed his chosen manager, Traci Brooks, at Bound for Glory, and promptly started going by "Robert Roode" while adopting a Wall Street stock trader gimmick, with Brooks now being referred to as "Ms. Brooks", his "Chief Executive Offender" (CEO). His first feud after the retool was against Eric Young, of whom he became jealous when he realized fans still were not cheering him, but cheered Young's every move. After Young beat Brooks in a bikini contest he demanded that Brooks "sign" Young to "Robert Roode Inc.". Finally, at the 2007 Against All Odds event Brooks successfully seduced Young into signing a contract with "Robert Roode Inc.", and Roode began to control Young by ordering him around. However, Young began to fight back due to the advice of a mystery "friend".

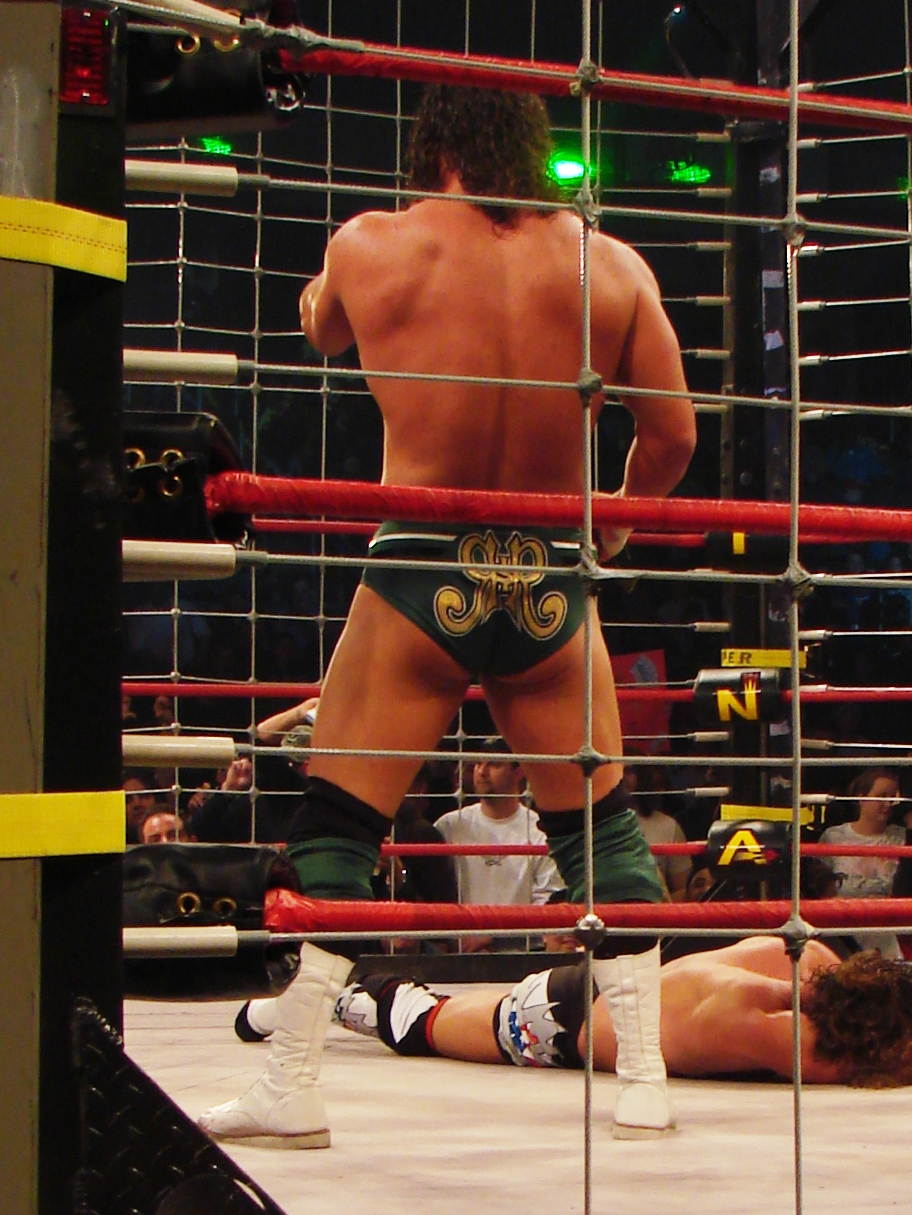
Roode at Lockdown in April 2007

At Lockdown, Roode faced Petey Williams, the man he believed to be Young's "friend", and won the match despite Young attempting to help Williams. The following week, Young proclaimed that Williams was not his "friend", and Roode, who controlled Young's contract, gave Young a week to tell him who his friend was or he'd be fired. The following week, Young revealed his "friend" to be Jeff Jarrett, which resulted in Roode facing Jarrett at Sacrifice. Roode went on to defeat Jarrett after hitting him with the Pay Off. Roode eventually faced Young in a match at Slammiversary. Roode scored the pinfall after hitting Young with a steel chair, but, just as he was about to fire Young, Jim Cornette came out and ordered the match to be restarted. Young then pinned Roode with an inside cradle, in the process severing his ties with Roode. At Victory Road, Roode and Ms. Brooks lost to Eric Young and Gail Kim in a Mixed tag team match.

Roode and Ms. Brooks then joined forces with Christian's Coalition to aid in their battles with Sting and Abyss, and on the July 26 episode of Impact!, Mike Tenay stated that Roode had joined the stable. Weeks after that, after Eric Young lost a match against Team 3D, Roode and Brooks "tarred and feathered" Young. On the August 7 episode of TNA Today Young issued a challenge for a "humiliation match" at Hard Justice to Roode, with the loser to be tarred and feathered. Roode won, but Ms. Brooks ended up tarred and feathered while Roode just watched from the stage and afterwards, as she questioned his loyalty, his apparent bullying of her became a key storyline and side angle.

Roode then entered a mini-feud with Kaz, who confronted Roode when he mistreated Ms. Brooks. Roode defeated Kaz at No Surrender. Soon afterwards, other wrestlers followed in Kaz's footsteps. An interview revealed that Brooks put up with Roode's actions because she needed to raise money for her ill mother. Since then, the "superstars' protest" portion of the mistreatment angle quietly faded, though Roode's egotistical bullying antics got worse.

Roode participated in the Fight for the Right Tournament. At Bound for Glory, he was the last person eliminated in the gauntlet section of the tournament by Eric Young and lost his opening tournament match to Junior Fatu. Around this time, Roode not only started mistreating Brooks even further, he started to show signs of full-blown misogyny in segments involving or referring to other women, such as Karen Angle, Gail Kim or Sharmell. In the loss to Fatu, the dissension was reciprocated by Brooks, who laughed as Fatu gave Roode a stinkface. On the November 8, 2007 episode of TNA Impact, Brooks finally stood up to Roode by shoving him away from his attack on Chris Harris, and herself attacking "Roode's No. 1 Fan". at Genesis (2007), Roode lost to Samoa Joe.

Roode formed a partnership with Christian Cage against TNA newcomer Booker T, claiming that "has beens" like Booker T show up and gain main event status at the expense of long time Talent like himself. at Turning Point (2007), Roode and Cage lost to Booker T and Kaz. Roode and Cage then aligned themselves with Kurt Angle, after an invitation to join the Angle Alliance on Impact!. This only lasted for one night, however, as the Angle Alliance lost to the team of Samoa Joe, Kevin Nash, Kaz, Booker T and Eric Young, when Nash pinned Roode. Cage and Roode then had a face to face altercation in the ring which lead to Angle and Roode attacking Cage, thus kicking Cage out of the Angle Alliance and turning the Angle-Cage tension into a full-blown feud.

At Final Resolution, Roode teamed up with Ms. Brooks in a mixed tag team match against Booker T and his wife Sharmell. After losing the match Roode finally completed his turn on Brooks and as Sharmell ran back into the ring to stop it, Roode turned around and hit her in the jaw, knocking her out. As Booker T ran to the ring to aid his wife, Roode escaped the ring, and looking back at the ring he realized what he had done. The following Impact!, Roode faced Brooks and fired her, but was stopped by Jim Cornette when he tried to lay hands on her. Subsequently, Roode's "number one fan" attacked Brooks when she was leaving the ring. Roode's fan, named Ms. Payton Banks, replaced Brooks.

After Final Resolution, and with Payton Banks by his side, Roode continued his feud with Booker T. at Against All Odds, where the two faced off in a singles match. Roode ran from the ring and escaped the arena in a car, only to further infuriate Booker. Booker and Roode faced off again at Destination X in a Stand By Your Man Strap Match, with the loser's manager (Banks for Roode, Brooks for Booker) to receive ten leather lashes from the winner's manager. Roode won after using a handcuff-armed fist, but Sharmell returned and whipped everyone with a leather belt, including Jim Cornette. The following week on Impact!, Cornette punished her by putting her in a mixed tag team match with Booker against Roode and Banks at Lockdown, which Booker and Sharmell won. After the match, Roode verbally abused Banks for losing, much like he used to abuse Ms. Brooks, effectively ending their alliance. At Sacrifice, Roode and Booker T lost to Christian Cage and Rhino in a Deuces Wild Tag Team Tournament Quarterfinal match. At Slammiversary, Roode competed in the King of the Mountain match for the TNA World Heavyweight Championship in a losing effort.

==== Beer Money, Inc. (2008–2011) ====
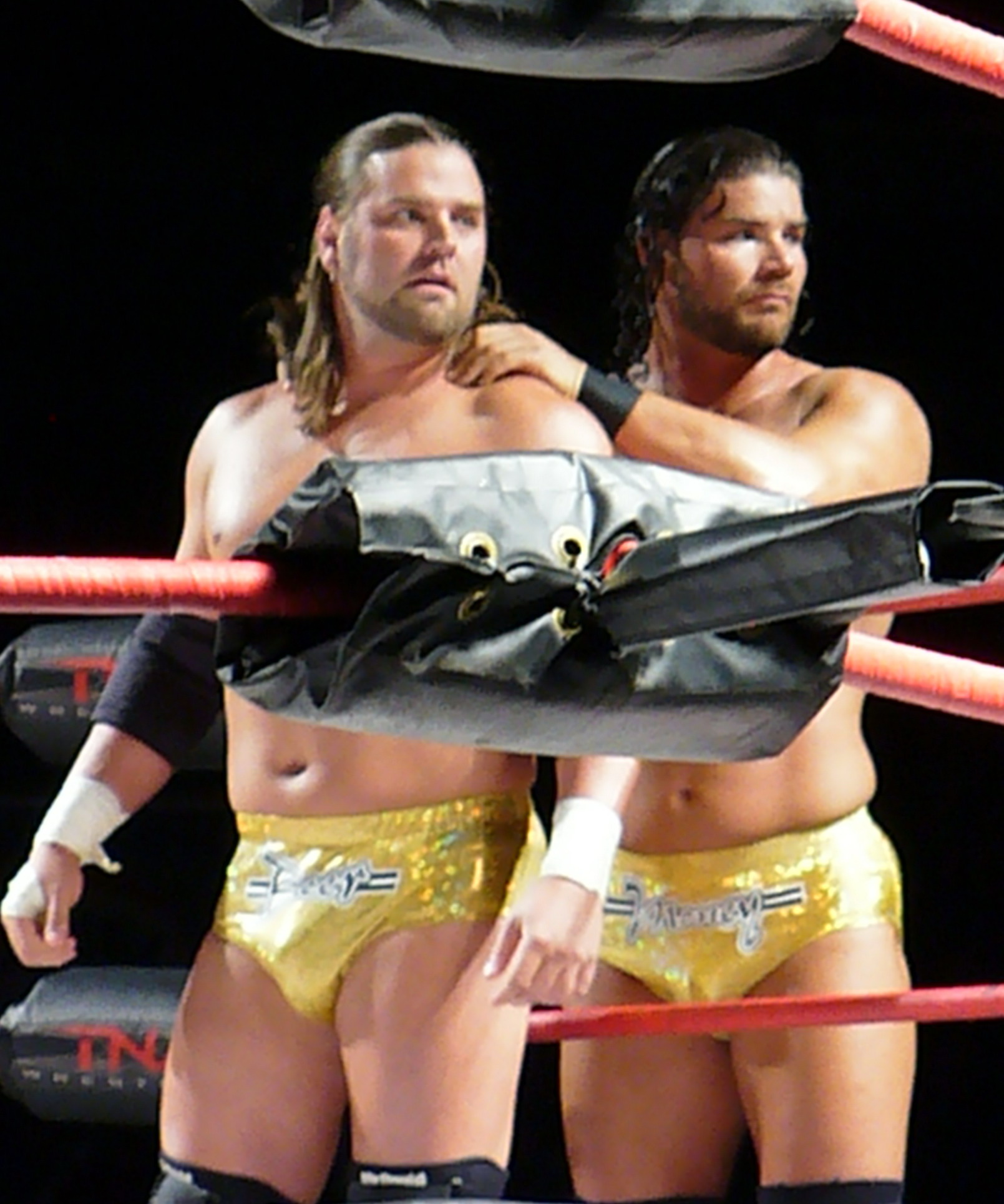
Beer Money, Inc. in London September 2008

On the June 12 episode of Impact!, Roode, along with James Storm, challenged The Latin American Xchange (LAX) (Homicide and Hernandez) for the TNA World Tag Team Championship. Storm and Roode won, after Storm performed a Last Call on Hernandez, with a belt wrapped around his boot. Hector Guerrero, LAX's manager, was at ringside, however, and got the match restarted by informing the referee about what had happened. LAX then retained, leading to Roode, Storm, and Jacqueline attacking LAX. The next week, LAX challenged Storm and Roode to a Fan's Revenge Lumberjack match at Victory Road. Roode and Storm then began calling themselves "Beer Money, Inc.", sometimes shortened to simply "Beer Money", with their name based on their individual gimmicks (Storm's beer-drinking cowboy gimmick representing "Beer" and Roode's Wall Street stock trader gimmick representing "Money"). At Victory Road, LAX won the match. At Hard Justice, however, Beer Money became the new TNA World Tag Team Champions, defeating LAX after hitting Homicide with a beer bottle. The feud continued through No Surrender with Beer Money, Inc. once again getting the win. At Bound for Glory IV, Beer Money successfully defended their titles in a four-team Monster's Ball match, after Roode pinned Hernandez of LAX.

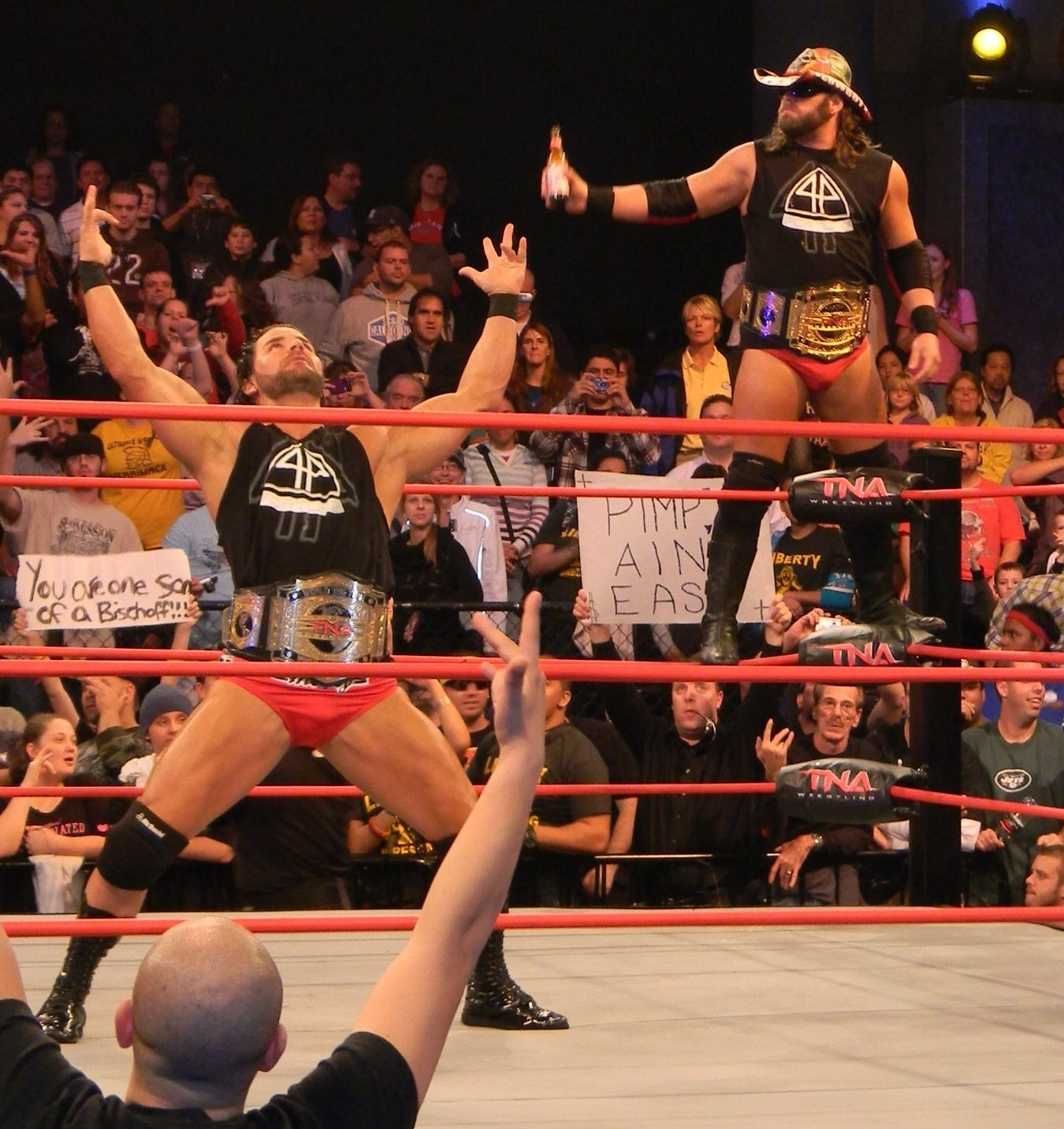
Beer Money, Inc. as TNA World Tag Team Champions

After that Beer Money retained the tag team championship at Turning Point against The Motor City Machine Guns (Alex Shelley and Chris Sabin). Beer Money, Inc. later engaged in a feud with Matt Morgan and Abyss, retaining the titles against them at Final Resolution. Roode and Storm lost the titles to Lethal and Creed on the January 8 episode of Impact! but regained them three days later at Genesis in a 3-way match which also involved the team of Abyss and Matt Morgan. Beer Money, Inc. faced Creed and Jay Lethal at Against All Odds and retained the championship. At Lockdown, Beer Money lost the TNA World Tag Team Championship to Team 3D in a Philadelphia Street Fight, where Team 3D's IWGP Tag Team Titles were also on the line. On May 21, Beer Money turned face by coming to the rescue of Team 3D, who were being attacked by The British Invasion (Doug Williams, Brutus Magnus and their bodyguard Rob Terry). They stated that from all of the times they have fought, Team 3D showed them that if you are going to fight, you should at least fight fairly. At Sacrifice Beer Money defeated The British Invasion to win the Team 3D Invitational Tag Team Tournament and earn the right to challenge Team 3D for the TNA World Tag Team Titles. At Slammiversary, Beer Money defeated Team 3D to win the TNA World Tag Team Titles for the third time. The following month at Victory Road, Beer Money lost the titles to Booker T and Scott Steiner of The Main Event Mafia.

The two teams' feud intertwined with that of Team 3D and the British Invasion, causing a three-month long war between the four teams. Beer Money went on to lose to the British Invasion in an IWGP Tag Team Championship match at Hard Justice, win a Lethal Lockdown match at No Surrender (teaming with Team 3D against MEM and the Invasion), and lose a 4-way Full Metal Mayhem match at Bound for Glory for both the TNA and IWGP Tag Team Championships, with Team 3D winning the IWGP belts and the British Invasion the TNA belts. Beer Money were permitted one last title shot the following Impact!, where they fought the British Invasion in a Six Sides of Steel match. Brutus Magnus had his team disqualified by punching the referee, causing him and Doug Williams to retain the championships. On the November 12 episode of Impact! Beer Money defeated the British Invasion in a non-title match to join the Motor City Machine Guns in the Tag Team Title match at Turning Point. At the Pay-Per-View The British Invasion managed to retain their titles after Kevin Nash nailed Storm with the TNA Global Championship belt. At Genesis Roode and Storm scored an upset victory over The Band of Kevin Nash and Syxx-Pac.

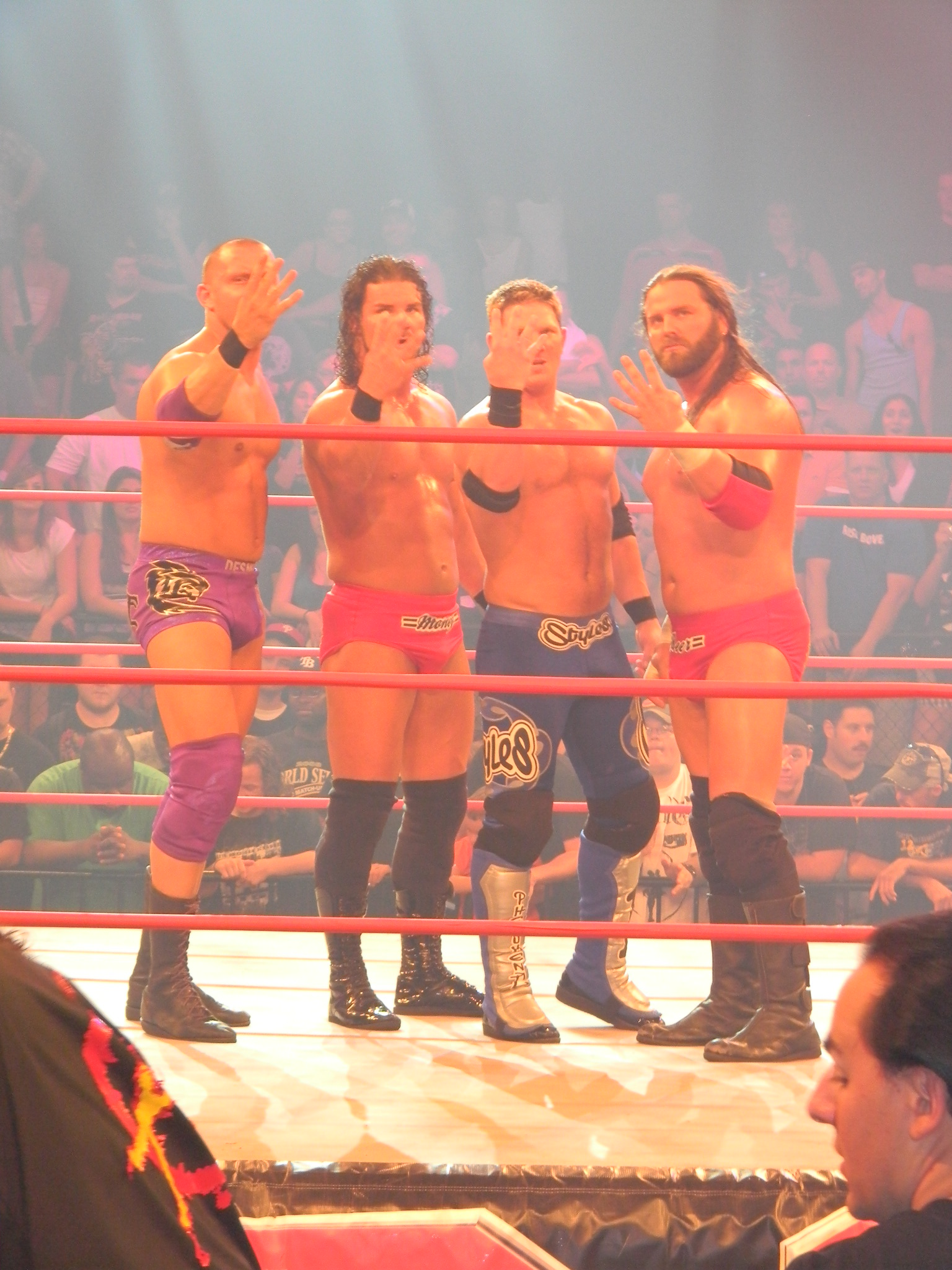
Fortune: (from left to right) Desmond Wolfe, Roode, A.J. Styles, and James Storm

With Hulk Hogan and Eric Bischoff taking over TNA at the beginning of 2010, Beer Money's TV time was significantly reduced. Upon their return to Impact!, Beer Money turned heel on the March 8 episode of Impact! by first volunteering to face Jeff Jarrett in a handicap match and then defeating him after a low blow and the DWI, claiming it was the only way they were going to get noticed by the new management. Roode and Storm had since acted as Bischoff's henchmen, taking on wrestlers he's had problems with, often in two-on-one situations. At Destination X Beer Money challenged Matt Morgan and Hernandez for the TNA World Tag Team Championship, but were unable to dethrone the defending champions. At Lockdown Beer Money, along with Sting and Desmond Wolfe, represented Team Flair in the annual Lethal Lockdown match, where they were defeated by Team Hogan (Abyss, Jeff Jarrett, Rob Van Dam and Jeff Hardy). They then started a feud with the newly formed team of Jeff Hardy and Mr. Anderson, known collectively as The Enigmatic Assholes, who went on to defeat them at Slammiversary VIII. On the following episode of Impact!, Ric Flair, who had aligned himself with Roode, Storm, A.J. Styles, Desmond Wolfe and Kazarian, revived the Four Horsemen under the new name Fourtune, stating that each of them had to earn their spots in the group; Flair also compared Storm and Roode to Ole Anderson and Tully Blanchard. After the TNA World Tag Team Championship was vacated in June, Beer Money entered a four-team, two-week-long tournament to decide the opponent of The Motor City Machine Guns for the titles at Victory Road. Beer Money advanced to the title match at the pay-per-view by defeating Team 3D and Ink Inc. (Jesse Neal and Shannon Moore). At Victory Road Beer Money was defeated by the Motor City Machine Guns in the match for the World Tag Team Championship. After Victory Road Beer Money entered a Best of Five Series with the Motor City Machine Guns, contested for the TNA World Tag Team Championship. Beer Money won the first two matches, a ladder match and a Street Fight, after knocking their opponents out with beer bottles. On the July 29 episode of Impact!, Ric Flair offered Roode and Storm, who were just one victory away from becoming four-time TNA World Tag Team Champions, the final two spots on Fourtune. However, Shelley and Sabin came back to win the two following matches in the Best of Five Series, a steel cage match and an Ultimate X match, to even the score to 2–2 and set up a deciding match for the August 12 episode of Impact!. On the August 12 episode of Impact! Beer Money, Inc. was defeated in a Two Out of Three Falls match and as a result lost the Best of Five Series 2–3. Later that night Douglas Williams and Matt Morgan were added to Fourtune, as the stable attacked EV 2.0, a stable consisting of former Extreme Championship Wrestling performers. In the weeks leading to Bound for Glory, the stable's name was tweaked to Fortune to represent the expansion in the number of members in the group. At Bound for Glory Roode, Storm, Styles, Kazarian and Morgan were defeated in a Lethal Lockdown match by EV 2.0 members Tommy Dreamer, Raven, Rhino, Sabu and Stevie Richards. On the following episode of Impact! Fortune formed an alliance with Hulk Hogan and Eric Bischoff's new stable, Immortal. At Turning Point Fortune defeated EV 2.0 in a ten-man tag team match and, as a result, EV 2.0's Sabu was released from TNA. The following month at Final Resolution, Roode and Storm returned to the TNA World Tag Team Championship picture by defeating Ink Inc. in a number one contender's match. On January 9, 2011, at Genesis, Beer Money, Inc. defeated the Motor City Machine Guns to win the TNA World Tag Team Championship for the fourth time.

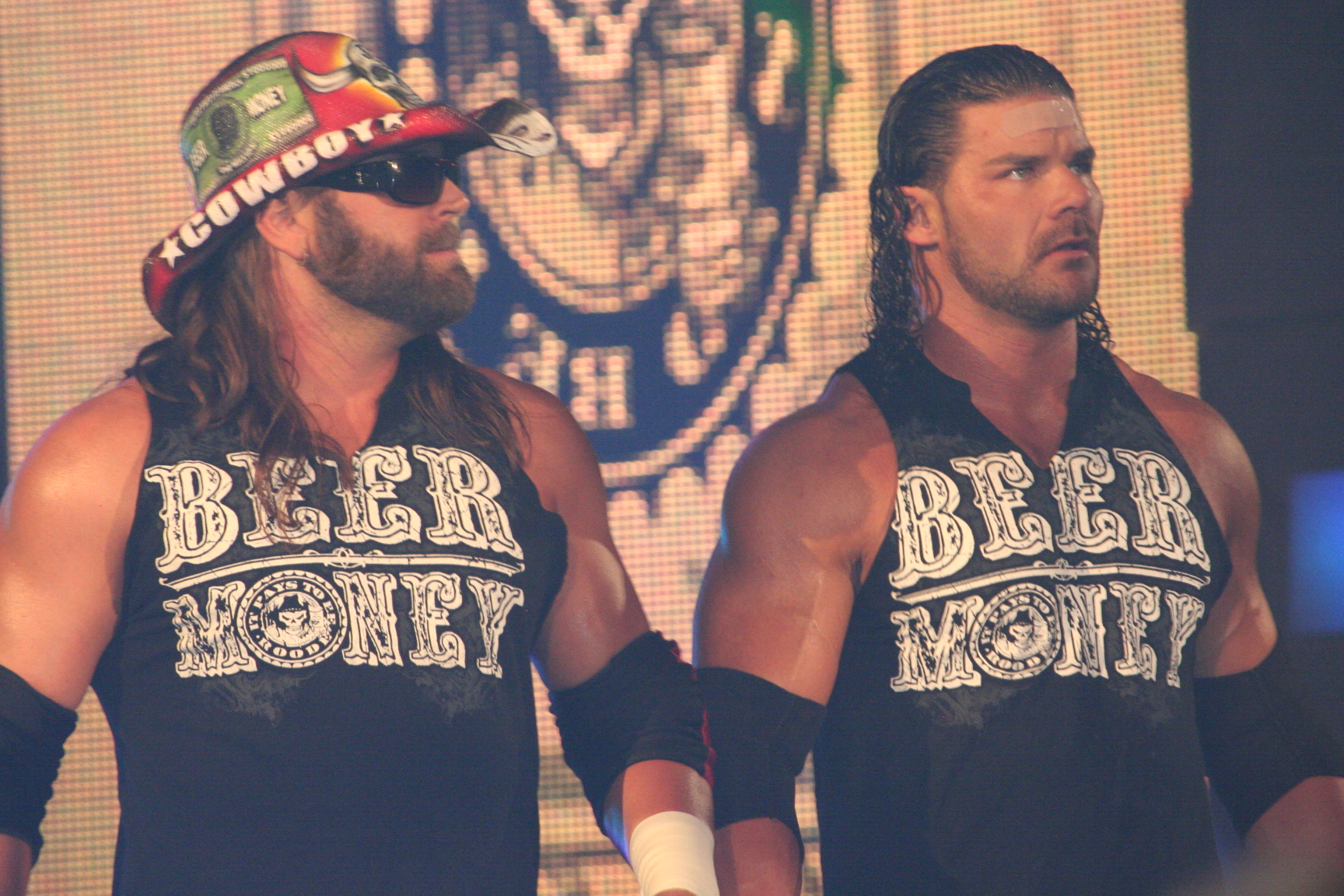
Beer Money, Inc. in July 2010

On January 31 at the tapings of the February 3 episode of Impact!, Fortune turned face by attacking Immortal, when they interfered in a TNA World Heavyweight Championship match between Mr. Anderson and Jeff Hardy. Ric Flair, who did not take part in Fortune's turn due being out with a torn rotator cuff, returned at the February 14 tapings of the February 17 episode of Impact!, turning on Fortune and jumping to Immortal. On April 17 at Lockdown, Roode, Storm, Kazarian and Christopher Daniels, who replaced an injured A.J. Styles, defeated Immortal representatives Ric Flair, Abyss, Bully Ray and Matt Hardy in a Lethal Lockdown match, when Roode forced Flair to submit with a Fujiwara armbar. The finish was used to write Flair off television for a month. In early May, Roode began once again using the first name Bobby. On May 15 at Sacrifice, Beer Money, Inc. successfully defended the TNA World Tag Team Championship against Immortal representatives Matt Hardy and Chris Harris, Storm's old tag team partner who had made his surprise return to TNA on the previous episode of Impact!. On the following episode of Impact Wrestling, Roode was a victim of a five-on-one beatdown at the hands of Immortal as a retribution for what he did to Flair at Lockdown. Two weeks later, Eric Bischoff attempted to strip Beer Money, Inc. of their TNA World Tag Team Championship due to Roode's injury, but was interrupted by the champions' former rival Alex Shelley (whose partner, Chris Sabin, had also become injured), who agreed to take Roode's spot in the title defense against the British Invasion at Slammiversary IX. At the pay-per-view, Storm and Shelley were successful in their title defense. Roode made his in-ring return on the June 23 episode of Impact Wrestling, in a tag team match, where he and Storm were defeated by Crimson and Matt Morgan. On July 13, Beer Money, Inc. became the longest reigning TNA World Tag Team Champions in the title's history, breaking the previous record of 184 days set by A.J. Styles and Tomko in 2007. On August 7 at Hardcore Justice, Beer Money, Inc. successfully defended the TNA World Tag Team Championship against Mexican America (Anarquia and Hernandez). Two days later, at the tapings of the August 18 episode of Impact Wrestling, Mexican America defeated Beer Money, Inc. in a rematch, following interference from Jeff Jarrett, to win the TNA World Tag Team Championship, ending Roode's and Storm's record-setting reign at 212 days.

==== TNA World Heavyweight Champion (2011–2013) ====
From June to September, Roode was one of the twelve participants in the Bound for Glory Series to determine the number one contender to the TNA World Heavyweight Championship. When the group stage of the tournament concluded, Roode finished in the top four and thus advanced to the finals at No Surrender along with James Storm, Bully Ray and Gunner. On September 11 at No Surrender, Roode defeated Gunner via submission, moving him up to 52 points, tying the score of Bully Ray, who had defeated Storm earlier in the event, and setting up a tiebreaker match between Roode and Ray. In the tiebreaker match, Roode defeated Ray via pinfall to win the Bound for Glory Series and earn a match for the TNA World Heavyweight Championship at Bound for Glory. In the weeks leading to Bound for Glory, TNA World Heavyweight Champion Kurt Angle, in an attempt to cause dissension within Fortune, forced Roode to face each of his stablemates in a series of singles matches, promising them title matches, should they be able to defeat him. In the first match on the September 15 episode of Impact Wrestling, Roode defeated Kazarian via submission. After Daniels refused to take part in his match, Roode finished the series by defeating Styles and Storm respectively on the September 29 and October 6 episodes of Impact Wrestling. On October 16 at Bound for Glory, Roode failed to win the TNA World Heavyweight Championship when he was pinned by Angle, after the referee failed to notice his arm under the ropes or Angle using the ropes for leverage.

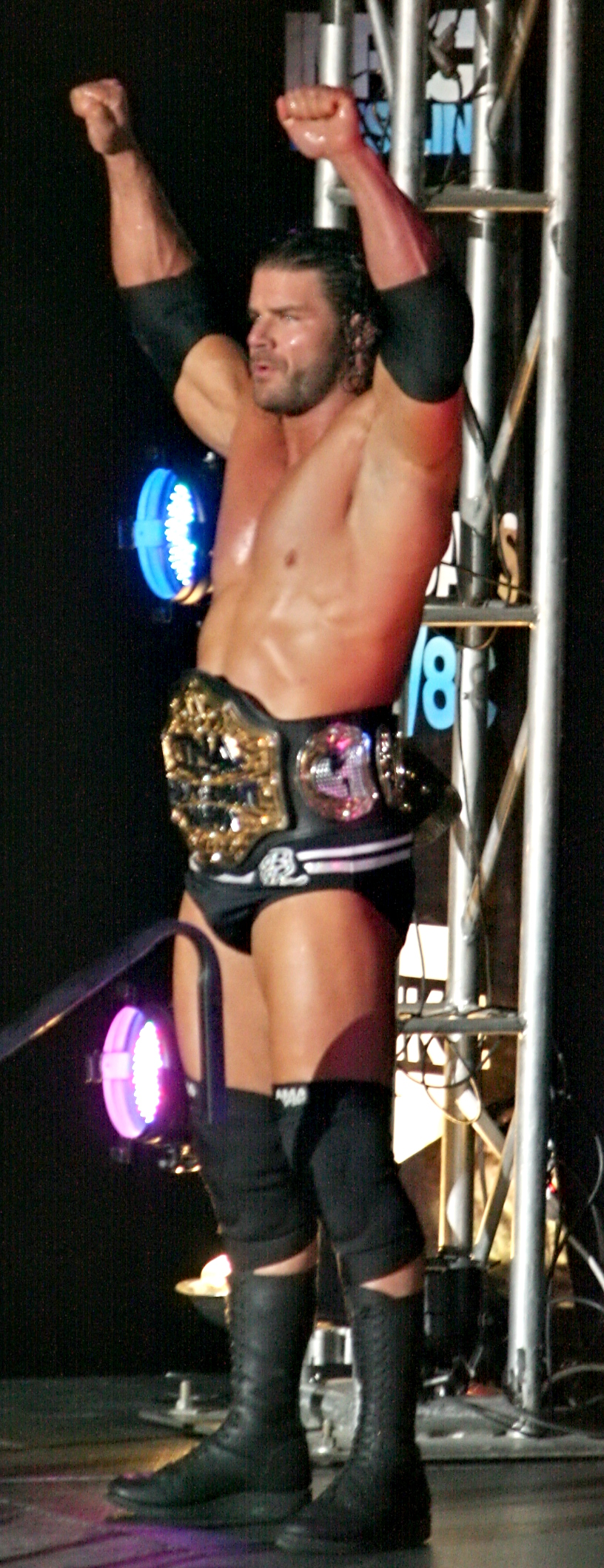
Roode as TNA World Heavyweight Champion

On the following episode of Impact Wrestling, after it was revealed that Roode was not eligible for a rematch with Angle, new authority figure Sting gave the next title shot to James Storm, who then went on to defeat Angle to become the new TNA World Heavyweight Champion. On the following episode of Impact Wrestling, Roode defeated Samoa Joe to become the number one contender to Storm's title. On the November 3 episode of Impact Wrestling, Roode defeated Storm to win the TNA World Heavyweight Championship, after hitting him with his own beer bottle, dissolving Beer Money, Inc. turning heel in the process. Roode and Storm had a rematch for the title the following week. As a result of a backstage attack, Storm came into the match bleeding and eventually lost, after passing out due to blood loss. After the match, Roode was challenged by his former Fortune stablemate, A.J. Styles. On November 13 at Turning Point, Roode successfully defended the TNA World Heavyweight Championship against Styles, pinning him while holding his tights. On December 11 at Final Resolution, Roode retained the TNA World Heavyweight Championship, after wrestling Styles to a draw in a 30-Minute Iron Man match. Roode and Styles wrestled a sudden death overtime period on the following episode of Impact Wrestling, where Roode managed to retain his title. On January 8, 2012, at Genesis, Roode again retained the TNA World Heavyweight Championship after getting himself disqualified in his title match against Jeff Hardy. On the following episode of Impact Wrestling, a rematch between Roode and Hardy ended in a no contest, following interference from Bully Ray. The following episode of Impact Wrestling, both Roode and Ray interfered in a number one contender's match between Hardy and Storm, which ended the match in a no contest. On February 12 at Against All Odds, Roode defeated Hardy, Ray, and Storm in a four-way match to retain the TNA World Heavyweight Championship after special ringside enforcer Sting accidentally knocked out Hardy with the title belt. The following episode of Impact Wrestling, Roode retained the championship against Hardy in a No Disqualification match, following interference from Kurt Angle. Roode then began feuding with TNA's General Manager Sting, which eventually led to Sting returning to the ring on March 18 at Victory Road, where Roode defeated him in a non-title No Holds Barred match. On April 15 at Lockdown, Roode defeated James Storm in a steel cage match to retain the TNA World Heavyweight Championship after being accidentally superkicked out of the cage for the win. On May 13 at Sacrifice, Roode defeated Rob Van Dam in a ladder match to retain the TNA World Heavyweight Championship. On the May 24 episode of Impact Wrestling, Roode successfully defended the title against A.J. Styles to break Styles' record of 211 days as TNA World Heavyweight Champion the following day. Following the match, Roode was attacked by the returning Sting. The following week, Roode was defeated by Sting in a non-title lumberjack match in the first live episode of Impact Wrestling. On June 10 at Slammiversary, Roode successfully defended the TNA World Heavyweight Championship in a rematch against Sting, after hitting him with James Storm's beer bottle. After the match, Roode was again attacked by Sting. On the following episode of Impact Wrestling, Roode made another successful title defense, defeating Mr. Anderson by submission. On July 8 at Destination X, Roode lost the TNA World Heavyweight Championship to Austin Aries, ending his reign at 256 days.

In an attempt to prove that Aries' victory had been a fluke, Roode faced the new TNA World Heavyweight Champion in a non-title match on the July 19 episode of Impact Wrestling. However, the match ended in a no contest, when both competitors were attacked by a group of masked assailants, known only as the "Aces & Eights". On August 12 at Hardcore Justice, Roode unsuccessfully challenged Aries for the TNA World Heavyweight Championship, with a pre-match stipulation preventing him from getting another rematch for the title as long as Aries was champion. After not being seen for several weeks, Roode returned on September 9 at No Surrender, costing James Storm his Bound for Glory Series semifinal match against Bully Ray. On the September 20 episode of Impact Wrestling, Storm challenged Roode to a match as part of the Open Fight Night. The match ended in a no contest, when referee Brian Hebner was unable control the two brawling rivals. The rivalry between Roode and Storm culminated on October 14 at Bound for Glory in a Street Fight, with King Mo serving as the special guest enforcer, which was won by Storm. On November 11 at Turning Point, Roode was again defeated by Storm in a three-way number one contenders match for the TNA World Heavyweight Championship, also involving A.J. Styles; however, Roode was not pinned; had he been, he would not get another title opportunity until Bound for Glory 2013. However, on the following episode of Impact Wrestling, Roode defeated Storm in a rematch for the number one contendership for the TNA World Heavyweight Championship. On the December 6 episode of Impact Wrestling, Roode was revealed as the man who paid off the Aces & Eights to attack TNA World Heavyweight Champion Jeff Hardy at the end of the show. Three days later at Final Resolution, Roode failed in his title challenge against Hardy, after which, both men were attacked by the Aces & Eights. On the following episode of Impact Wrestling, Aces & Eights member Devon revealed Roode was outbidded by Austin Aries to prevent him from winning the title. The following week, Roode attacked Aries in the main event of the evening, costing him his shot at the World Heavyweight Championship. Roode and Aries faced off in a number one contender's match on the next episode of Impact Wrestling. The match ended in a no contest after the two attacked referee Earl Hebner and then were, in turn attacked by Hardy. The rivalry culminated in a three-way elimination match on January 13, 2013, at Genesis, where Roode failed again to capture the TNA World Heavyweight Championship from Hardy.

==== Championship pursuits and reigns (2013–2015) ====
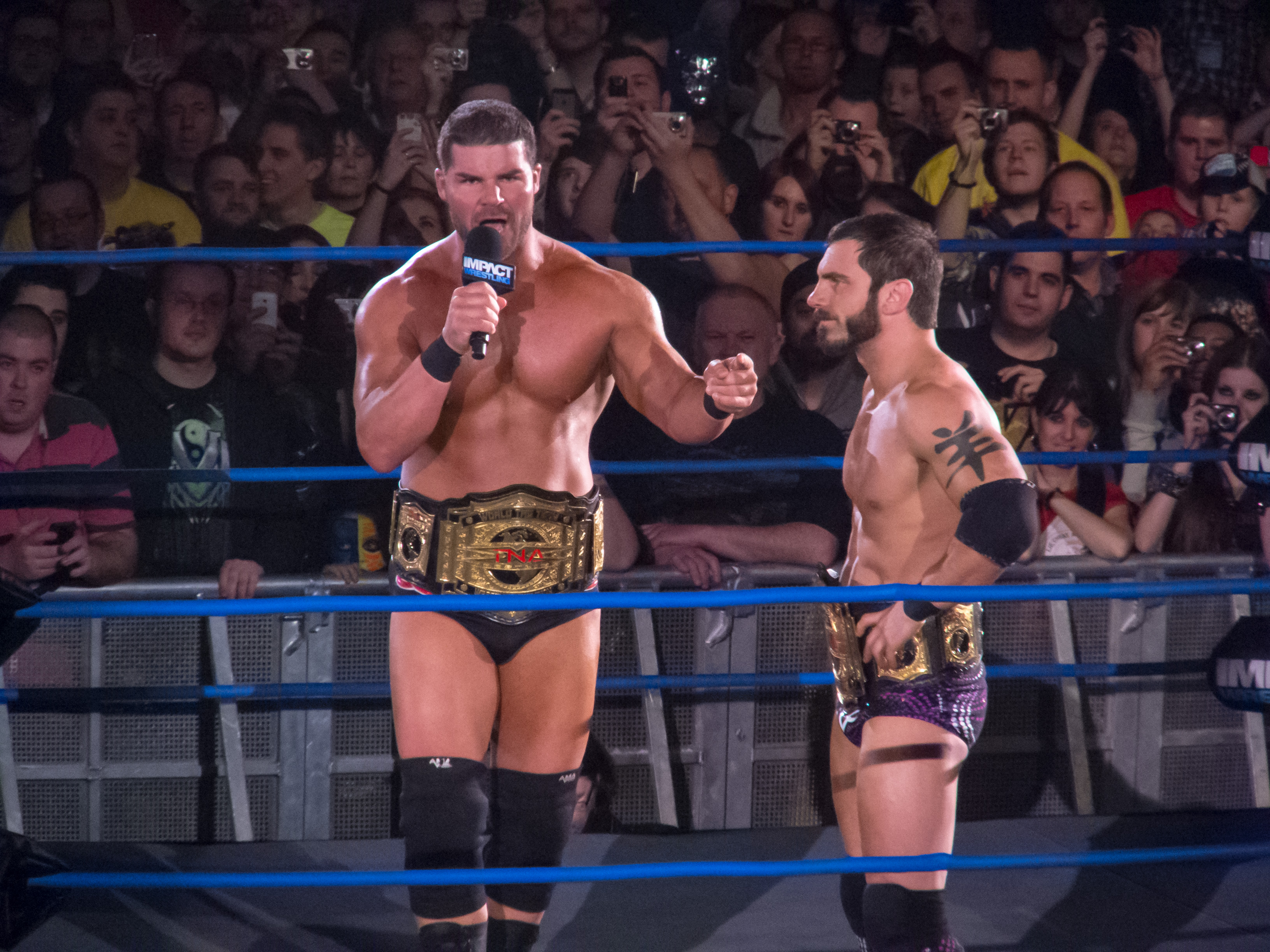
Roode and Austin Aries as TNA World Tag Team Champions

On January 25, at the tapings of the January 31 episode of Impact Wrestling in Manchester, England, Roode and Aries defeated Chavo Guerrero Jr. and Hernandez to win the TNA World Tag Team Championship, for the fifth time in his career. Roode and Aries made their first successful title defense on March 10 at Lockdown, defeating Bad Influence (Christopher Daniels and Kazarian) and Chavo Guerrero, Jr. and Hernandez in a three-way match. On the March 21 episode of Impact Wrestling, Roode and Aries defeated Guerrero and Hernandez to retain the TNA World Tag Team Championship, following interference from Daniels and Kazarian. Afterwards, the champions were attacked by Daniels and Kazarian. On the April 11 episode of Impact Wrestling, Roode and Aries lost the TNA World Tag Team Championship back to Guerrero and Hernandez in a Two-out-of-Three Falls match, ending their reign at 76 days. Roode and Aries received their rematch on the April 25 episode of Impact Wrestling, but were again defeated by Guerrero and Hernandez after an inadvertent interference from Christopher Daniels and Kazarian. Roode and Aries faced Daniels and Kazarian in number one contenders match on the May 9 episode of Impact Wrestling, however, the match ended in a no contest after special guest referee James Storm superkicked Aries and Daniels and walked out on the match. Roode and Aries received another shot at Guerrero and Hernandez's titles on June 2 at Slammiversary XI, in a fatal four-way elimination match, which also included Bad Influence and was won by Gunner and James Storm.

As a result of previously winning the Bound for Glory Series, Roode and Jeff Hardy were entered into the 2013 Bound for Glory Series on the June 13 episode of Impact Wrestling. Roode began the BFG series with a string of losses against Jeff Hardy, Magnus, and his former tag team partner Austin Aries. On the August 1 episode of Impact Wrestling, Roode claimed he would go back to his old ways in order to regain the World Heavyweight Championship. Roode then defeated Hernandez via pinfall, after hitting him in the head with a beer bottle, to earn seven points in the tournament. The following week, Roode allied himself with Christopher Daniels and Kazarian to form a new force and so that one of them would win the Bound for Glory series. On August 15 at Impact Wrestling: Hardcore Justice, Roode defeated Magnus, Mr. Anderson, and Samoa Joe in a tables match, following interference from Daniels and Kazarian, to capture twenty points in the BFG Series. The following week, the trio labelled themselves EGO and Roode and Kazarian went on to defeat TNA World Tag Team Champions Gunner and James Storm in a non-title match. EGO also tried to recruit Roode's former tag team partner Austin Aries, but Aries answered their offer by attacking Daniels and costing him his BFG series match. Roode's participation in the Bound for Glory series ended on the September 5 episode of Impact Wrestling, when he was eliminated from a twenty-point battle royal by A.J. Styles.

EGO went on to feud with Magnus by attacking him and costing him several matches. On the October 3 episode of Impact Wrestling, Magnus ran a gauntlet match against EGO and eliminated both Daniels and Kazarian before Roode won the match by making Magnus submit to an ankle lock. As a result of defeating Magnus, EGO held a mock Hall of Fame induction for Roode the following week, in mockery to Kurt Angle's induction, leading to Angle returning, attacking all three members of EGO in retaliation, and issuing a challenge to Roode at Bound for Glory, which Roode accepted. On October 20 at Bound for Glory, Roode defeated Kurt Angle after Angle injured himself while hitting his finisher. The two had a rematch on the October 31 episode of Impact Wrestling, where Roode won via referee stoppage after Angle suffered convulsions and post-concussive symptoms. After his two victories, Roode continued the feud by insulting Angle and brawling with him. Simultaneously, Roode entered a tournament for the vacant World Heavyweight Championship and defeated James Storm in a Florida Death Match in the first round to advance. Two weeks later, after losing in the semi-finals to Jeff Hardy in a Tables match, Roode attacked Angle during his match with Magnus, costing him and also eliminating him from the tournament. On December 19 at Final Resolution, Roode defeated Angle again in a 2-out-of-3 falls match. The rivalry culminated in a steel cage match on January 23, 2014, at Genesis, where Angle emerged victorious.

With his rivalry with Angle behind him, Roode began having problems with TNA President Dixie Carter due to being upset about not receiving a World title opportunity after aiding her on many occasions. On the February 20 episode of Impact Wrestling, Roode considered leaving TNA, citing changes in opinions on Angle and Carter, but was then persuaded to agree to captain Team Dixie against Team MVP at Lockdown in return for 10% ownership if Team Dixie was successful. On March 2, Roode was part of a group of TNA wrestlers that took part in Wrestle-1's Kaisen: Outbreak event in Tokyo, Japan. During the event, Roode was defeated by Masakatsu Funaki in a singles match. On March 9 at Lockdown, Team Dixie (Roode, The BroMans (Jessie Godderz and Robbie E), and Austin Aries) were defeated by Team MVP (MVP, The Wolves (Eddie Edwards and Davey Richards) and Willow) in the Lethal Lockdown match after special referee Bully Ray powerbombed Roode through a table, allowing MVP to pin him and gain control of TNA. This started a rivalry between Roode and Ray, with the two attacking each other on several occasions. At Sacrifice, Roode defeated Bully Ray in a Tables match, thanks to an intervention of Dixie Carter.

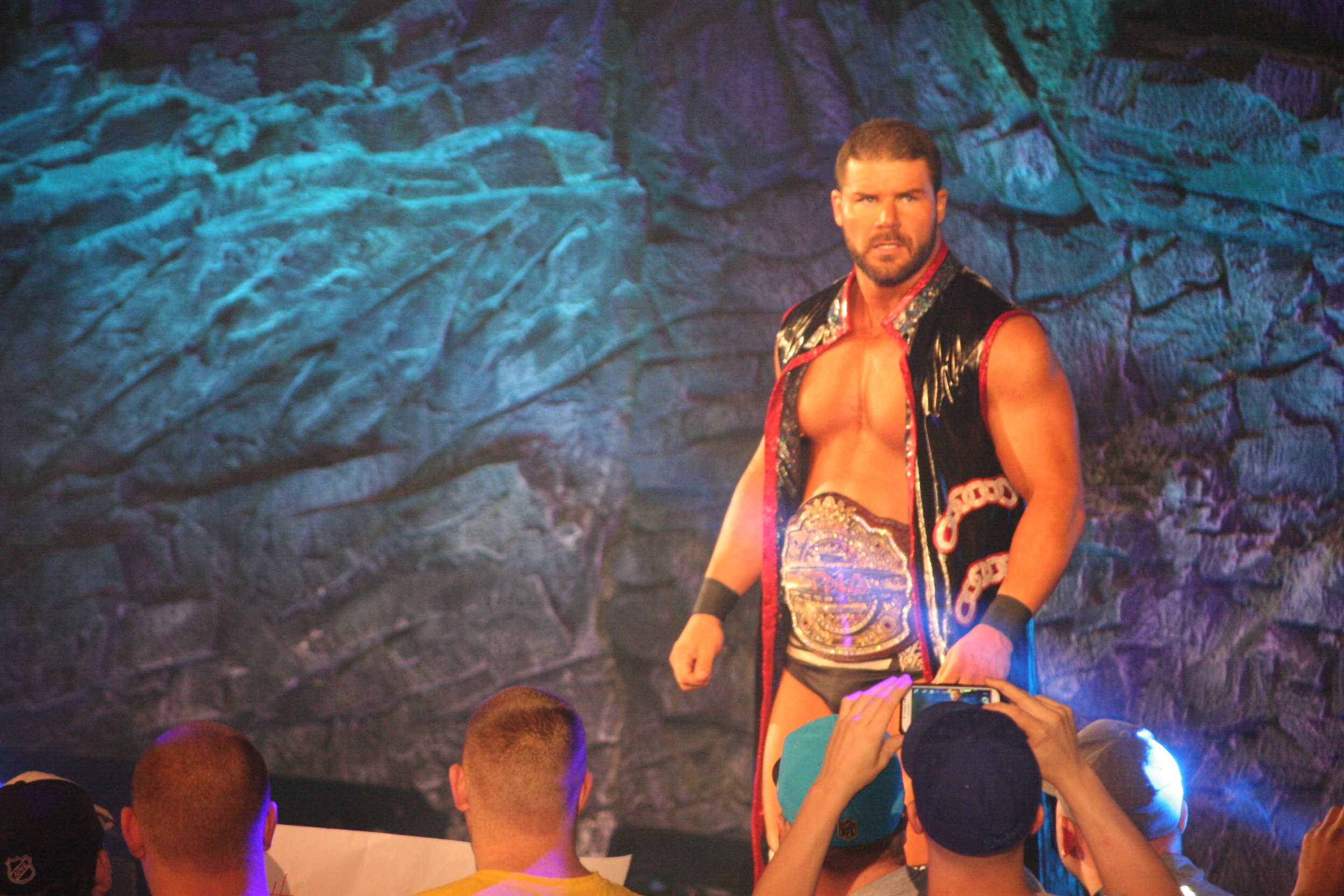
Roode as TNA King of the Mountain Champion in October 2015

At the edition of May 9 of Impact Wrestling, Bobby Roode showed signs of a possible face turn when he showed mutual respect for TNA World Champion Eric Young, and the two shook hands on one more championship match for that same night. The match, however, did not happen because TNA Director of Operations MVP declined to make the match. At the end of the episode, MVP ended up attacking Young and declared himself the number-one contender for the TNA World Heavyweight Championship at Slammiversary. At the edition of May 15 of Impact Wrestling, Roode was suspended indefinitely for his confrontation with MVP. A campaign began on impactwrestling.com to lift Roode's suspension. On the edition of June 19 of Impact Wrestling, Roode returned and attacked Kenny King and saving his long-time best friend Eric Young from further injury after losing the TNA World Heavyweight Championship to Lashley, and turning face in the process for the first time since 2011. On the July 3 episode of Impact Wrestling, he defeated Kenny King in a Street Fight and MVP on the July 24 episode of Impact Wrestling in a Falls Count Anywhere match. On the September 3 episode of Impact Wrestling, he defeated Eric Young to be the number one contender to the TNA World Heavyweight Championship. However, he was defeated by Lashley at No Surrender and failed to win the title. On the October 15 episode of Impact Wrestling, he defeated Austin Aries, Eric Young and Jeff Hardy once again to be the number one contender to the TNA World Heavyweight Championship. On September 18, 2014, in the main event of the Impact Wrestling episode taped to air on October 28, Roode defeated Lashley to win the TNA World Heavyweight Championship for the second time. He successfully retained his title against MVP on the November 5 episode of Impact Wrestling. On November 15, 2014, Roode successfully defended the TNA World Heavyweight Championship against Tommy Dreamer at House of Hardcore VII. On January 7, 2015 on Impact Wrestling Roode lost the TNA World Heavyweight Championship to Lashley, after interference from MVP, Kenny King, and two masked men who seconds later revealed themselves as Samoa Joe and Low Ki. Roode's best friend Eric Young came out with a steel chair to scare them away but ultimately hit Roode with the chair, costing him the match. On the January 16, 2015, episode of Impact Wrestling, Roode was defeated by Young in a No Disqualification match. On the January 23 episode of Impact Wrestling, Roode teamed with Kurt Angle, but lost once again against Eric Young and Low Ki. However, Bobby Roode defeated Eric Young in a Six Sides of Steel match at Lockdown and once again in a Last Man Standing match on the March 13 episode of Impact Wrestling. The feud ended in a Submission match on the April 3 episode of Impact Wrestling, which Eric Young won.

In May, Roode reformed Dirty Heels with Austin Aries in pursuit of the vacant TNA World Tag Team Championship. They both agreed to a best of five series with The Wolves. On June 3, 2015 in the third match of the series, with The Wolves up 2–0, Aries pressured Roode to hit Eddie Edwards with a steel chair. As Roode refused, Aries distracted the referee and Roode hit Edwards with a low blow and hit him with a steel chair to win the match, thanks to the influence of Aries, turning heel in the process. They win the fourth round on the June 24 episode of Impact Wrestling, in a Full Metal Mayhem match. At Slammiversary, Roode helped Aries to beat Davey Richards for pick the stipulation for the fifth match of the best of five series. Later, he competed in the King of the Mountain match for the reactivated TNA King of the Mountain Championship, in a losing effort. Roode and Aries lost the best of five series to The Wolves for the tag titles in the fifth match on the July 1 episode of Impact Wrestling in an Iron Man match. On the July 22 episode of Impact Wrestling, Roode lost a Tables match to Matt Hardy. On the August 5 episode of Impact Wrestling, Aries was forced to face Rockstar Spud, with Aries' TNA career and Spud's "Rockstar" moniker on the line. Aries ultimately lost the match, resulting in him leaving TNA. On the August 12 episode of Impact Wrestling, Roode attacked Rockstar Spud for ending Aries' career in TNA when Spud defeated Aries the previous week.

==== Beer Money reunion and departure (2015–2016) ====
On the September 2 episode of Impact Wrestling, Roode showed signs of a face turn after he defeated GFW representative PJ Black to win the TNA King of the Mountain Championship. On October 4, at Bound for Glory, Roode successfully defended his King of the Mountain Championship against Lashley. After the match, Roode and Lashley shook hands, thus turning Roode face once again. During October and November (taped in July), he participated in the TNA World Title Series. Roode ended first of his block, tied with Eric Young, advancing to the finals where he was defeated in the round of 16 by Matt Hardy.

On January 5, 2016 on TNA's debut on Pop, James Storm returned to TNA to help Bobby Roode fight off Eric Young and Bram. After Storm told Roode he wanted to "get back to having fun", Storm handed Roode a beer officially reuniting Beer Money, Inc. On the January 12, 2016, edition of Impact Wrestling, Roode lost the TNA King of the Mountain Championship to Eric Young. At TNA One Night Only, Beer Money defeated Eric Young and Bram. In a rematch at Lockdown, Beer Money defeated once again Eric Young and Bram in a Six Sides of Steel match, thus ending the feud. On February 9, 2016, Beer Money attempted to cash in their title shot against current champions the Wolves, however in their attempt to cash in, Decay (Abyss, Crazzy Steve, Rosemary) stopped them and mysteriously asked them to join their path of Decay. They eventually challenged the group to a match, but it ended in disqualification when Abyss pulled the referee out of the ring and began choking him. After the match, Crazzy Steve hit a low blow on Roode. On the March 8 episode of Impact Wrestling, Beer Money successfully cashed their Feast or Fired against The Wolves and win the TNA World Tag Team Championship for the fifth time in their career. They successfully retained their titles against The BroMans on the March 22 episode of Impact Wrestling and against Decay, The BroMans and Eric Young and Bram on the April 12 episode of Impact Wrestling. Their feud against Decay culminated at Sacrifice in a Valley of Shadow match, which Decay won, winning the TNA World Tag Team Championship. On March 19, 2016, TNA announced Roode's departure from the company after 12 years.

=== New Japan Pro-Wrestling (2009–2011) ===
Through TNA's working relationships with various Japanese promotions, Roode has competed in Japan numerous times, beginning in 2009 when he and Storm, as Beer Money, debuted in New Japan Pro-Wrestling (NJPW), defeating Legend (Akira and Masahiro Chono). They returned to New Japan in October 2010, first defeating Bad Intentions (Karl Anderson and Giant Bernard), and then No Limit (Tetsuya Naito and Yujiro Takahashi). Storm and Roode made their debuts in the Tokyo Dome on January 4, 2011, at Wrestle Kingdom V, taking part in a three-way tag team match for the IWGP Tag Team Championship, won by Bad Intentions.

=== Return to the independent circuit (2014–2016) ===
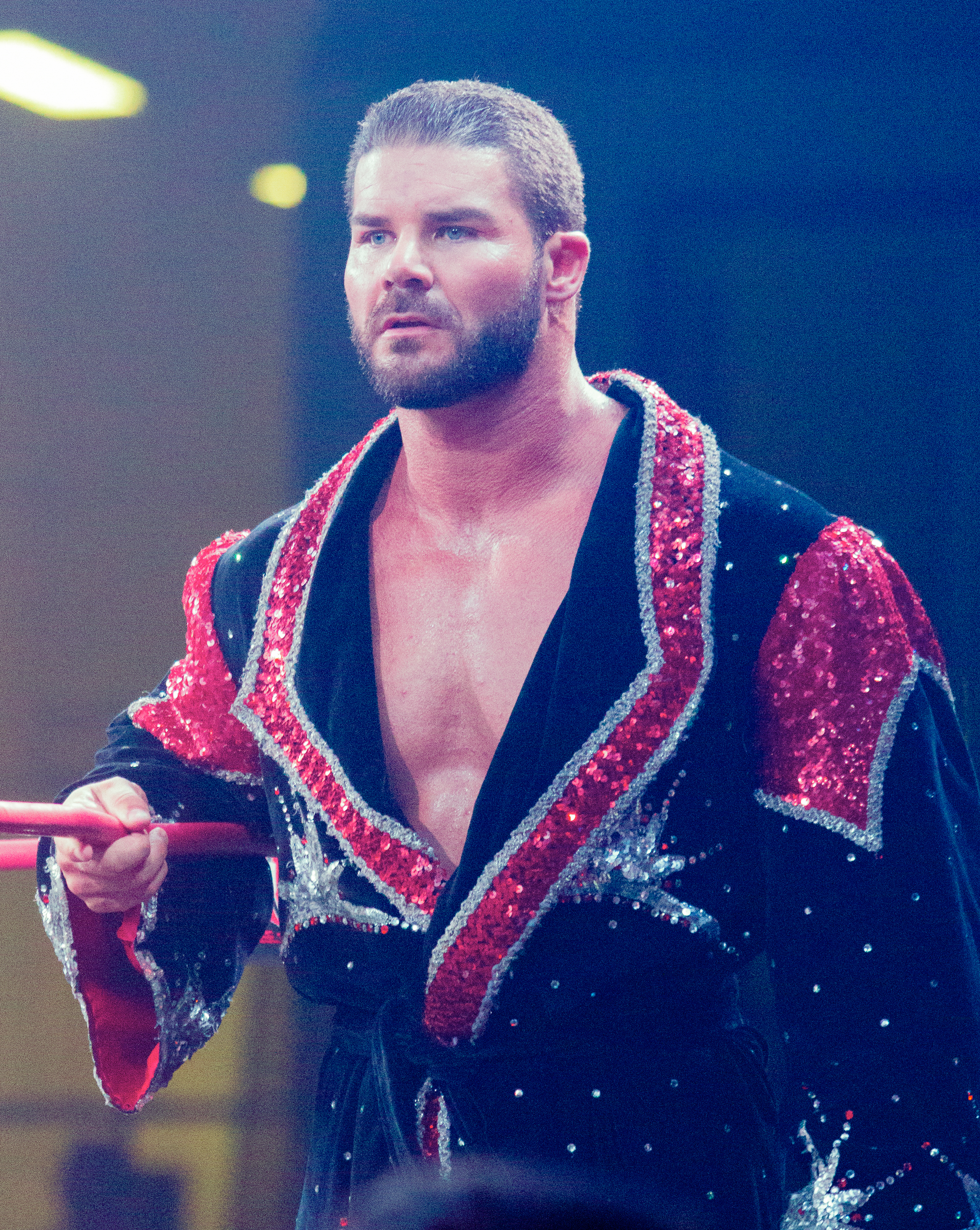
Roode making his ring entrance at House of Hardcore 9

Bobby Roode made his debut for House of Hardcore on November 15, 2014 as a surprise opponent for Tommy Dreamer in a successful defense of the TNA World Heavyweight Championship. On March 7, 2015 at House of Hardcore VIII, Dirty Heels lost to The Young Bucks (Matt and Nick Jackson) in the main event. On July 1, 2015, Roode competed in Global Force Wrestling's Global Championship tournament. Roode made it to the finals, losing to Nick Aldis. On July 18, 2015 at House of Hardcore IX, Roode defeated Pepper Parks. On November 13, 2015 at House of Hardcore 11, Roode faced Austin Aries in a losing effort. At House of Hardcore 11, Dirty Heels (Roode and Austin Aries) faced The Wolves for the TNA World Tag Team Championship but failed to win the titles. At House of Hardcore 14, Roode defeated Eric Young In the main event with Jimmy Korderas as the special guest referee.

=== WWE ===
==== NXT Champion (2016–2017) ====
On April 1, 2016, Roode was shown on-screen standing in the crowd at NXT TakeOver: Dallas. On June 8 at NXT TakeOver: The End, Roode appeared backstage during an interview with NXT General Manager William Regal, where he was seen walking into Regal's office, hinting that Roode was about to sign with WWE or had already done so. On June 11 during NXT's tour in the United Kingdom at Download Festival, Roode made his in-ring debut and defeated Angelo Dawkins. On August 3, Roode made his NXT television debut and quickly turned on the crowd to establish himself as a heel. The following week on NXT, Roode appeared after Andrade "Cien" Almas defeated Angelo Dawkins and informed Almas that General Manager William Regal scheduled a match between the two on August 20 at NXT TakeOver: Brooklyn II, where Roode defeated Almas. On the September 14 episode of NXT, Roode defeated No Way Jose in his Full Sail University debut. On the September 28 episode of NXT, Roode appeared after Tye Dillinger defeated Angelo Dawkins and later persuaded Dillinger to be his tag team partner for the 2016 Dusty Rhodes Tag Team Classic. On the October 12 episode of NXT, Roode and Dillinger were defeated by SAnitY (Alexander Wolfe and Sawyer Fulton) in the first round after Roode walked out on Dillinger during the match. Roode and Dillinger attacked each other following their matches throughout the subsequent weeks, leading to a match on November 19 at NXT TakeOver: Toronto, in which Roode defeated Dillinger.

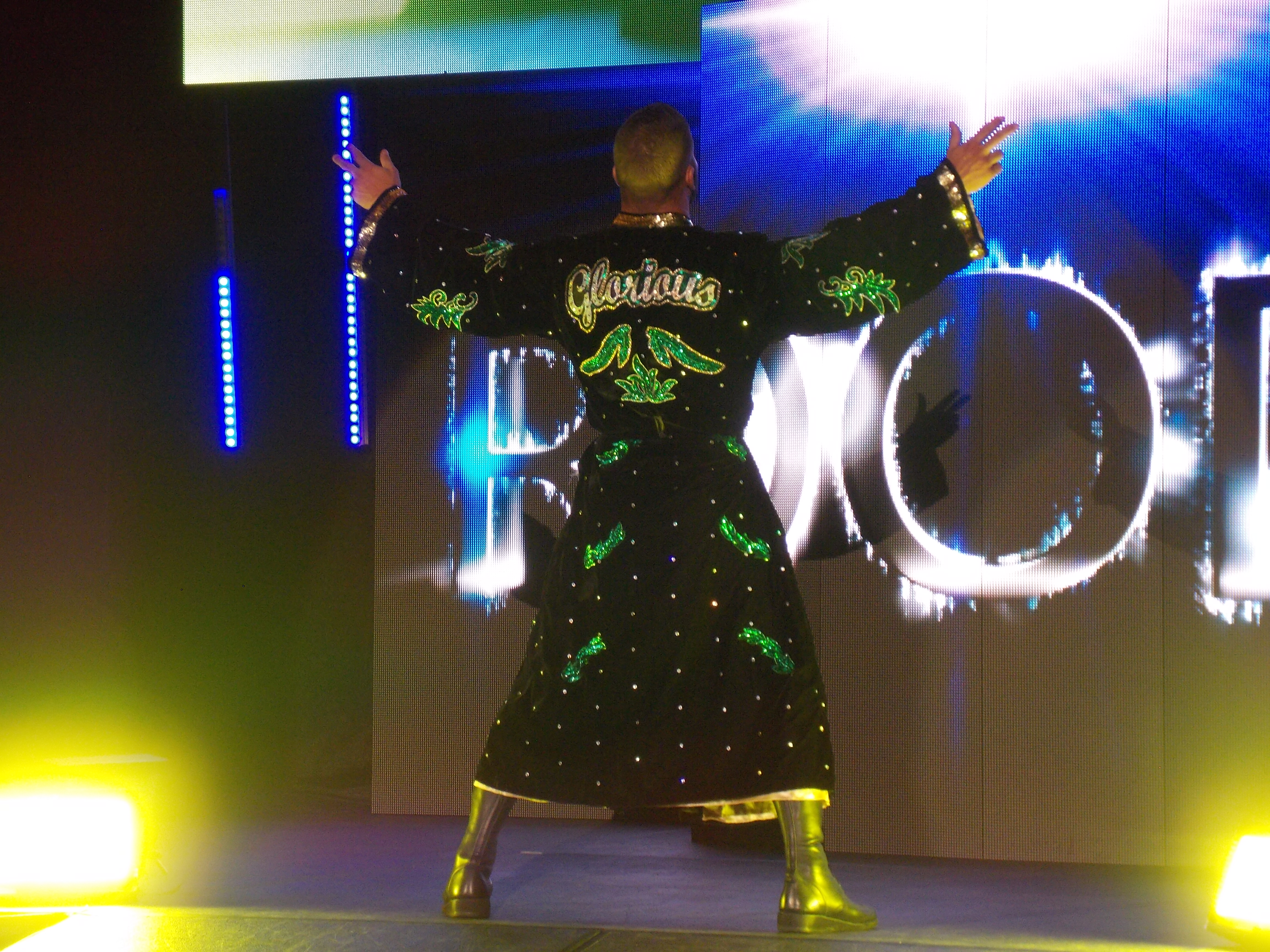
Roode making his entrance in September 2016

On the December 14 episode of NXT, Roode qualified for a #1 contender's fatal four-way match for the NXT Championship after defeating Oney Lorcan. On the December 21 episode of NXT, Roode defeated Andrade "Cien" Almas, Tye Dillinger and Roderick Strong in the fatal four-way match to earn the title shot against NXT Champion Shinsuke Nakamura. On January 28, 2017 at NXT TakeOver: San Antonio, Roode defeated Nakamura to win the title, becoming the oldest NXT champion in WWE history at the time (record beaten by Samoa Joe ) . On the March 15 episode of NXT, Roode made his first successful title defense, defeating Kassius Ohno. On April 1 at NXT TakeOver: Orlando, Roode successfully defended the title against Nakamura in a rematch, giving Nakamura his first clean singles loss in his departing match from NXT. On the April 19 episode of NXT, Roode was interrupted by Hideo Itami, who attacked him with a GTS. On May 20 at NXT TakeOver: Chicago, Roode retained the NXT Championship against Itami. On the June 7 episode of NXT, Roderick Strong announced his intentions of capturing the NXT Championship and Roode came out to mock him. Sparking a rivalry, the two engaged in a backstage brawl two weeks later after Roode mocked Strong and his family. On the July 5 episode of NXT, Roode successfully defended the NXT Championship against Strong. On the July 19 episode of NXT, Drew McIntyre defeated Killian Dain, earning the right to challenge Roode for the NXT Championship. On the August 2 episode of NXT, Strong attempted to attack Roode during a backstage interview, in which Roode claimed to be a "better man" than Strong. On the August 16 episode of NXT, Roode attacked both McIntyre and Strong during their main event to end the show. On August 19 at NXT TakeOver: Brooklyn III, Roode lost the NXT Championship to McIntyre, giving Roode his first singles loss in NXT. On the August 30 episode of NXT, Roode lost to Strong in his last televised NXT match. Roode wrestled his NXT farewell match at a NXT live event in Toronto on September 9, when he defeated Velveteen Dream.

==== United States Champion (2017–2018) ====
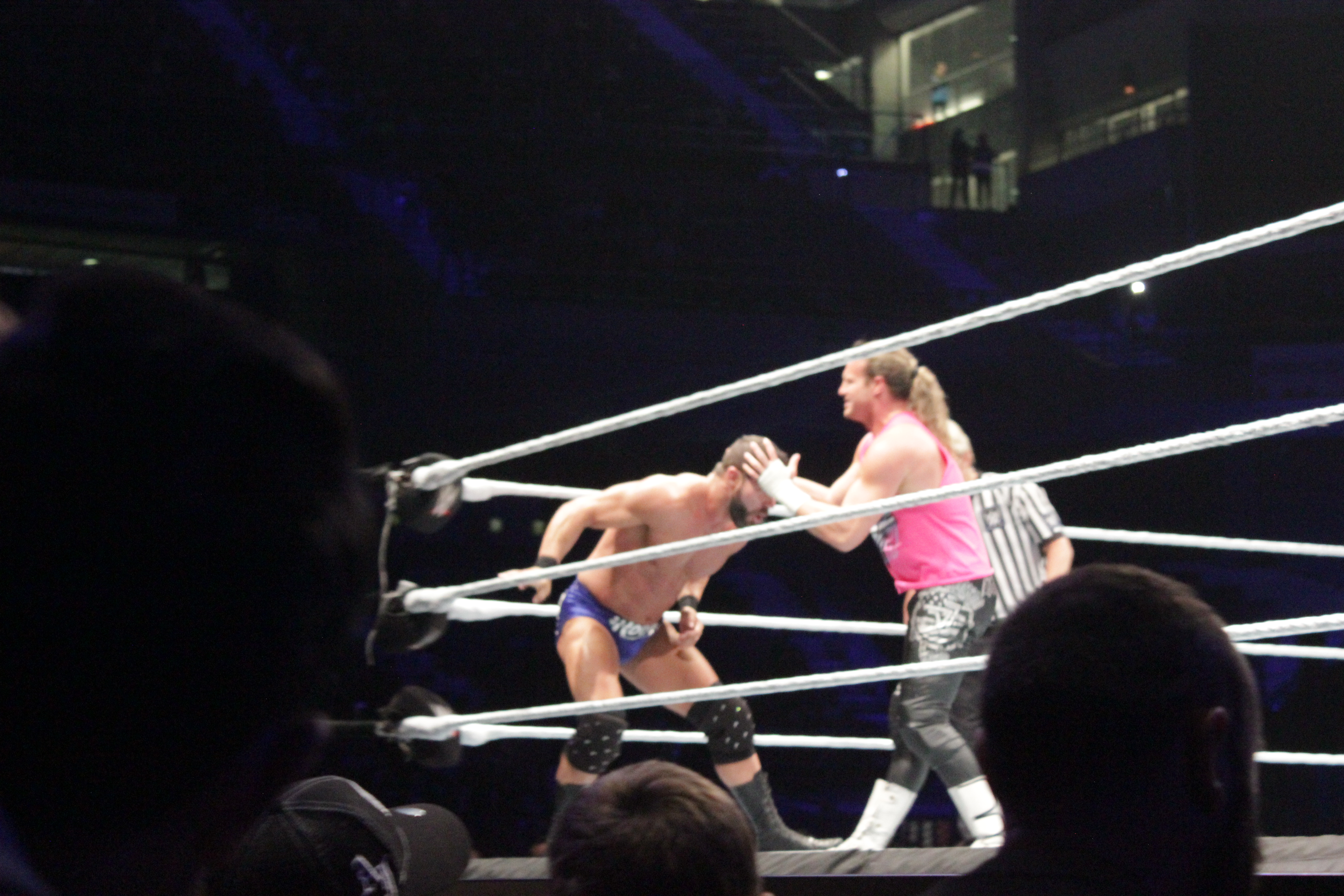
Roode's first feud on the main roster was with Dolph Ziggler, who would become his tag team partner in the following years.

On the August 22 episode of SmackDown, Roode made his main roster debut as a face, defeating Aiden English in a singles match and later defeated Mike Kanellis on the following episode of SmackDown Live. On the September 26 episode of SmackDown Live, Roode confronted and challenged Dolph Ziggler for a match on October 8 at Hell in a Cell which Roode won with a roll-up whilst holding Ziggler's tights. Afterwards, Ziggler attacked Roode and demanded a rematch on the following episode of SmackDown Live which Roode accepted, suffering his first pinfall loss on the main roster as this time it was Ziggler who held Roode's tights. On the October 24 episode of SmackDown Live, Roode interrupted a backstage interview with Ziggler and Renee Young, suggesting a two out of three falls match next week on SmackDown Live with Ziggler, which he accepted. Roode then defeated Ziggler two falls to one, ending their feud and also earning a spot on Team SmackDown at Survivor Series. On November 19 at Survivor Series, Roode was eliminated second overall by Braun Strowman and Team SmackDown then eventually lost to Team Raw. In late November, Roode started a rivalry with United States Champion Baron Corbin, leading to a match for the title on December 17 at Clash of Champions also involving Ziggler, who won the title by pinning Corbin.

On January 3, 2018, Roode was announced to team with SmackDown Women's Champion Charlotte Flair (dubbed The Robe Warriors) in the Mixed Match Challenge tournament. After Ziggler vacated the United States Championship on the December 19 episode of SmackDown Live, an eight-man tournament was set up to crown a new champion. Roode defeated Baron Corbin in the first round and Mojo Rawley in the semi-finals. On the January 16 episode of SmackDown Live, Roode defeated Jinder Mahal in the final to win his first championship since joining the main roster. Roode would hold the title for 54 days, retaining against Rawley during the Royal Rumble kick-off show during an open challenge and Rusev on the February 6 episode of SmackDown Live, Roode lost the title against Randy Orton at Fastlane, causing Roode to attack Orton out of frustration after saving him from Mahal. Roode tried to regain the title at WrestleMania 34 in a fatal 4-way match against Orton, Mahal and Rusev, which was won by Mahal. During this time, in the Mixed Match Challenge, Flair (who had to undergo a minor teeth surgery) was replaced by Becky Lynch via fan-vote on social media, and Roode and Lynch defeated Finn Bálor and Sasha Banks. Flair returned for the finals of the Mixed Match Challenge, which Roode and Flair lost to the team of The Miz and Asuka.

==== Teaming with Chad Gable (2018–2019) ====
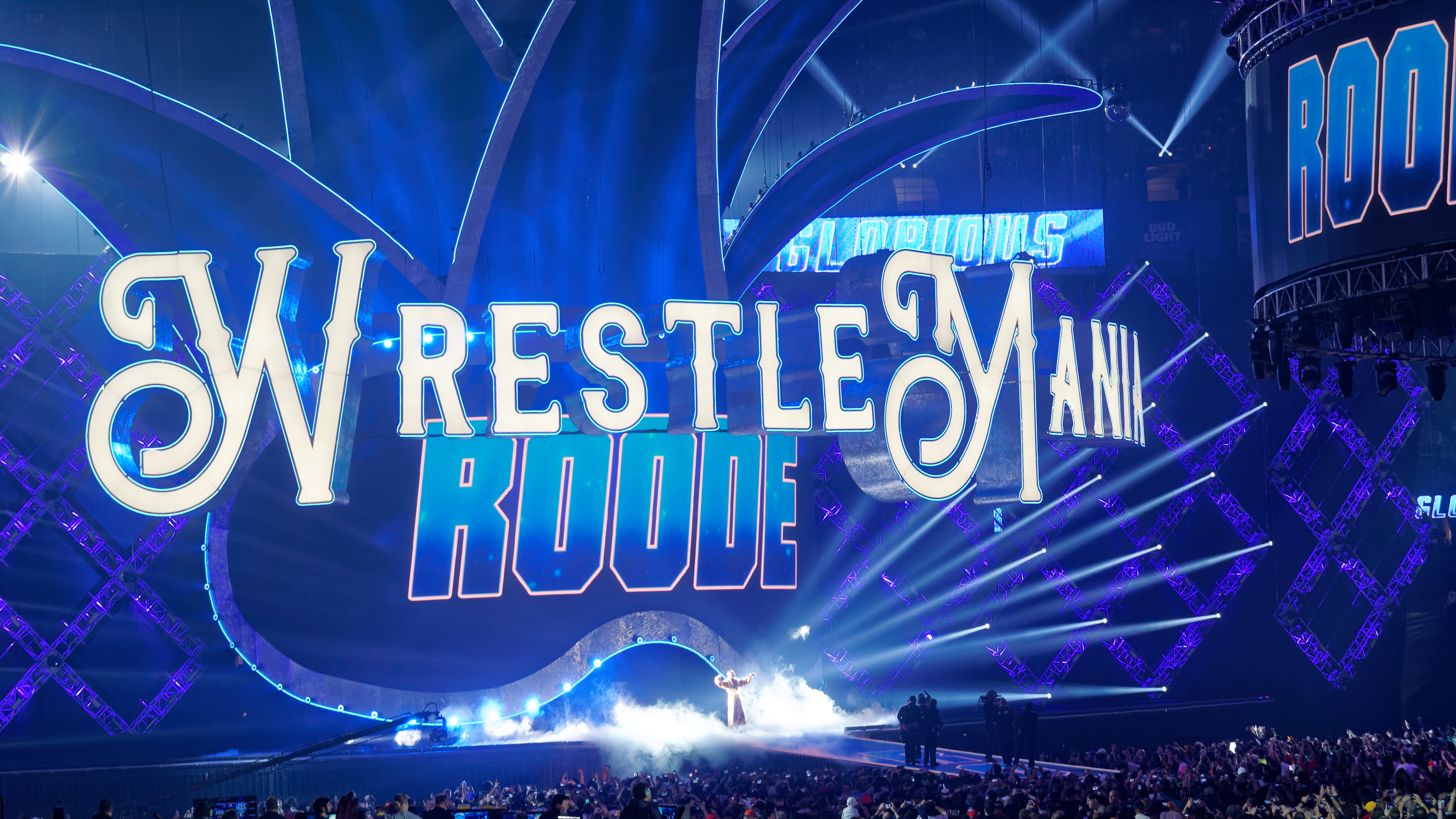
Roode made his WrestleMania debut at WrestleMania 34.

On April 16, Roode was moved to the Raw brand as part of the Superstar Shake-up. In his Raw debut, he was unveiled as the surprise member of the ten man tag match in which he teamed with Bobby Lashley, Braun Strowman, Finn Bálor, and Seth Rollins in successful fashion as they faced off against The Miz, Bo Dallas, Curtis Axel, Kevin Owens, and Sami Zayn. At the Greatest Royal Rumble event, Roode performed in his first ever Royal Rumble match, lasting just under eighteen minutes before being eliminated by Baron Corbin. Roode's first rivalry on the Raw roster was with Elias with the pair trading victories over the months of April and May. On the May 14 episode of Raw, Roode defeated Baron Corbin and No Way Jose to qualify for the Men's Money in the Bank ladder match at Money in the Bank on June 17, which was won by Braun Strowman.

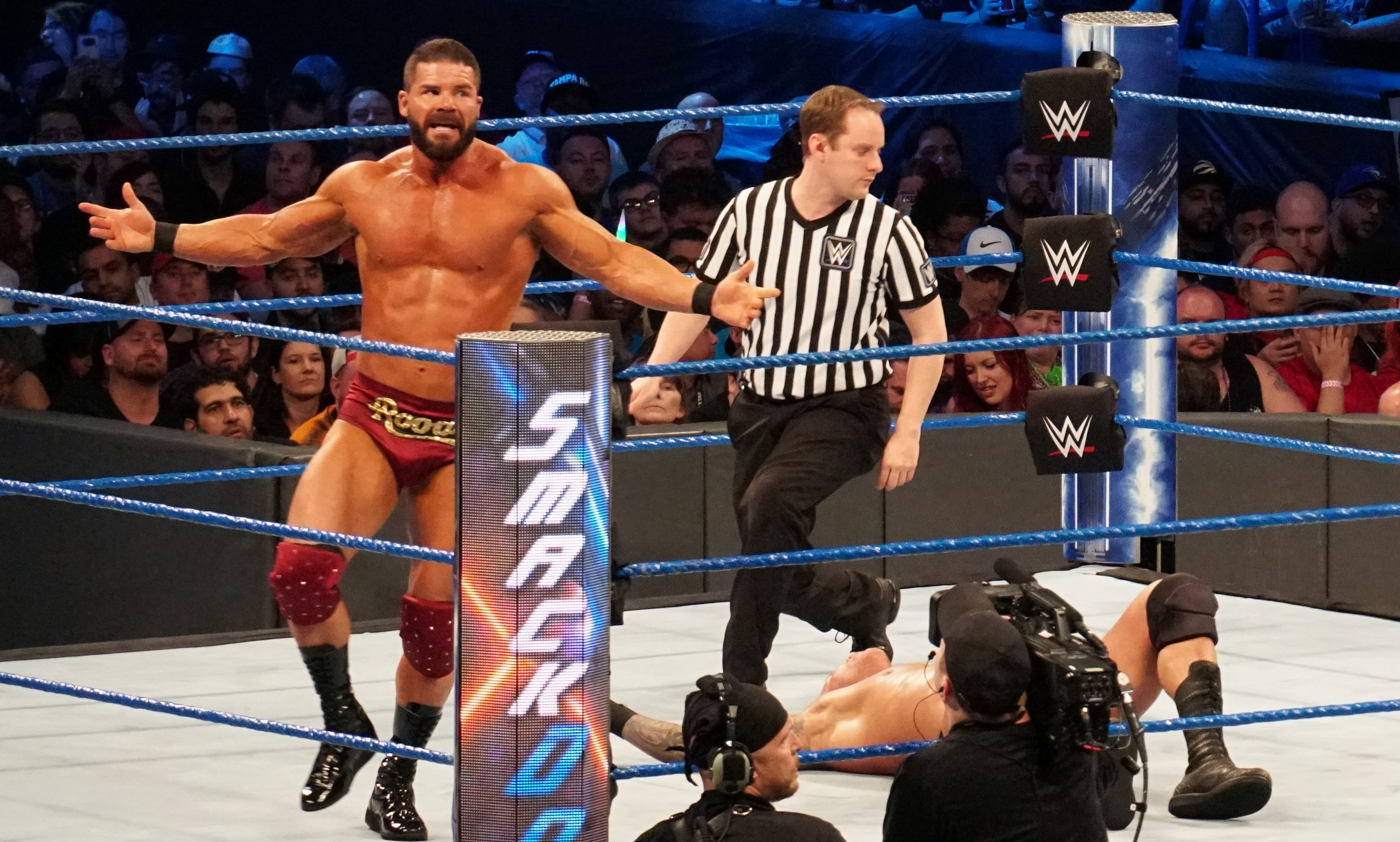
Roode during a match in April 2018.

On the September 3 episode of Raw, Roode started a partnership with Chad Gable and went on to defeat The Ascension. At Survivor Series, they would lead the Raw tag team division, but they would lose to Team SmackDown in a 10-on-10 Survivor Series tag team elimination match. After feuding with them for weeks, Roode and Gable defeated AOP (Akam and Rezar) and their manager Drake Maverick in a three-on-two handicap to capture the Raw Tag Team Championship on the December 10 episode of Raw, after Roode pinned Maverick. At TLC: Tables, Ladders & Chairs, Roode and Gable along with Balor, Crews and Angle helped Strowman defeat Baron Corbin in a Tables, Ladders, and Chairs match and Corbin was stripped of all authoritative power. Roode and Gable would go on to beat The Revival in title matches on December 24, 2018 episode of Raw and on the January 7, 2019 episode of Raw in a Lumberjack Match and then again on the January 21 episode of Raw with Curt Hawkins as the special guest referee. At the Royal Rumble kick-off show, Gable and Roode defeated Rezar and Scott Dawson in a non-title match. The match stipulation stated that if Rezar and Dawson were to win, their respective teams (AOP and The Revival) would both receive tag team championship matches. The Revival would eventually receive their title match on the February 11 episode of Raw, in which Gable and Roode lost the championship. On the March 4 episode of Raw, Roode and Gable interfered in The Revival's match with Ricochet and Aleister Black, attacking both teams. At Fastlane, Roode and Gable competed in a triple threat tag team match for the Raw Tag Team Championship, which was won by The Revival. At WrestleMania 35, Roode competed in the André the Giant Memorial Battle Royal, but was unsuccessful.

On the April 8 episode of Raw, Roode and Gable turned heel by attacking Aleister Black and Ricochet, after losing a tag team match to them. This would be Roode's first time as a heel on the main roster. On April 16, Chad Gable was drafted to SmackDown during the Superstar Shake-up, disbanding the team and leaving Roode on his own. On the April 22 episode of Raw, Roode, sporting a clean shave and moustache, formalized his name to Robert Roode, before defeating Ricochet. At Super ShowDown, Roode competed in the 50-Man Battle Royal where he was unsuccessful.

==== The Dirty Dawgs (2019–2022) ====
On the August 26 episode of Raw, Roode teamed with Dolph Ziggler to win a tag-team turmoil match to earn a Raw Tag Team Championship match against Seth Rollins and Braun Strowman at Clash of Champions. At the event on September 15, they won the titles after Roode pinned Rollins. On the September 30 episode of Raw, Roode and Ziggler defeated Heavy Machinery (Otis and Tucker) to retain the titles. On the October 14 episode of Raw, Roode and Ziggler lost the titles to The Viking Raiders (Erik and Ivar), ending their reign at 29 days. Later that night, both Roode and Ziggler were drafted to the SmackDown brand as part of the 2019 Draft. At Survivor Series, Roode and Ziggler won a 10-team Interbrand Tag Team Battle Royal.

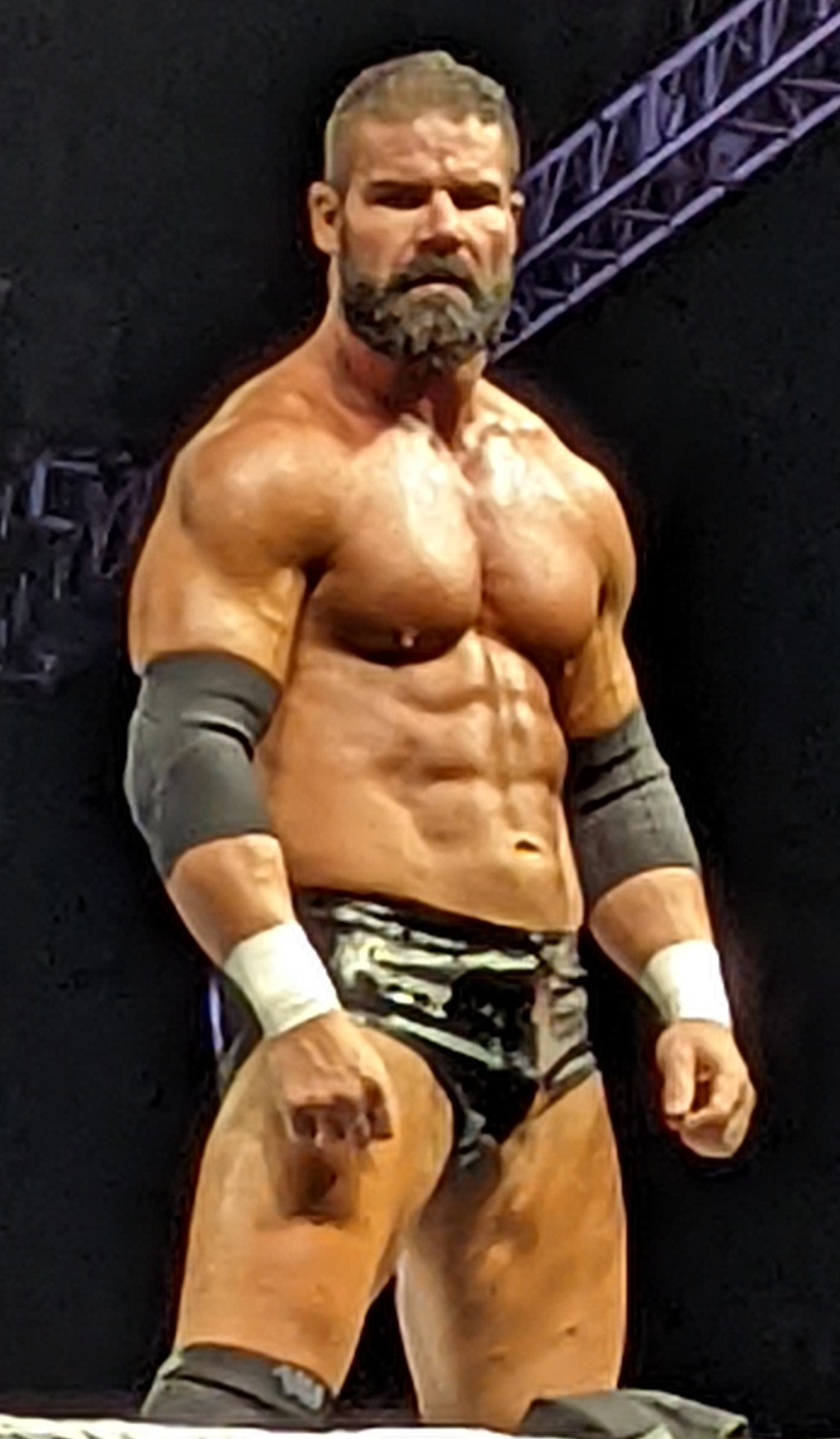
Roode in 2022

In the following weeks, they aligned themselves with King Corbin during his feud against Roman Reigns. On December 10, Roode was suspended for 30 days, for violating WWE's Wellness Policy. Roode returned on the January 10, 2020 episode of SmackDown, where he helped Ziggler and Corbin beat down Reigns and The Usos. Roode entered the Royal Rumble match at the namesake pay-per-view at number 4, but was eliminated by Brock Lesnar. At Elimination Chamber, Roode and Ziggler competed in the namesake match for the SmackDown Tag Team Championship, where the champions The Miz and John Morrison retained. Following Elimination Chamber, Roode was not seen on television as he was not able to travel due to the COVID-19 pandemic. On the June 22 episode of Raw, it was announced that Roode and Ziggler were traded to the Raw brand. On the September 28 episode of Raw, Roode returned and answered Drew McIntyre's WWE Championship open challenge, where he failed to win the title. As part of the 2020 Draft in October, both Roode and Ziggler was drafted back to the SmackDown brand. At Survivor Series, Roode competed in an 18-man Dual Brand Battle Royal, which was won by The Miz.

On the January 8, 2021 episode of SmackDown, Roode and Ziggler defeated The Street Profits (Angelo Dawkins and Montez Ford) to win the SmackDown Tag Team Championship. This would mark the team's first SmackDown Tag Team Championship, second tag team championship overall as a team, and Roode's third tag team championship as an individual. On the February 5 episode of Smackdown, Roode and Ziggler defeated Alpha Academy in a non title tag-team match. On the April 2 episode of Smackdown, Roode and Ziggler together with Alpha Academy defeated The Mysterios (composed of Rey and Dominik Mysterio) and the Street Profits in an 8-person tag-team match. At WrestleMania SmackDown on April 8, Roode and Ziggler defeated Alpha Academy, The Mysterios and The Street Profits in a Fatal four Way match to retain the titles. On the April 16 episode of SmackDown, Roode and Ziggler defeated The Street Profits to retain the titles. At WrestleMania Backlash, Roode and Ziggler lost the titles to The Mysterios, ending their reign at 128 days. As part of the 2021 Draft, both Roode and Ziggler were drafted to the Raw brand. On the October 4 episode of Raw, Roode and Ziggler lost to Big E and Drew McIntyre. On the October 25 episode of Raw, Ziggler and Roode defeated Alpha Academy and the Street Profits in a #1 contenders match for a Raw tag team Championship match later on that night, Roode and Ziggler failed to win the titles against RK-Bro. On the November 1 episode of Raw, Roode and Ziggler defeated The Street Profits in a tag-team match. At Survivor Series, Roode competed in a 25-man dual branded battle royal which was won by Omos. On the December 6 episode of Raw, Roode unsuccessfully challenged Damian Priest for his United States Championship. On the December 13 episode of Raw, Roode and Ziggler defeated Damian Priest and Finn Bálor in a tag-team match.

At Royal Rumble, on January 29, 2022, Roode competed in the Royal Rumble match where he was eliminated by AJ Styles. The night before WrestleMania 38 during the "WrestleMania Edition" of SmackDown, Roode competed in the André the Giant Memorial Battle Royal which was won by Madcap Moss. On the June 6 episode of Raw, Roode and Ziggler returned for the first time in months, where they appeared for an interview segment on the stage but would be interrupted by Omos and MVP. Ziggler then superkicked MVP and both Roode and Ziggler were chased out of the arena by Omos, therefore turning both men face. Roode wrestled his final match on June 25 at a live event, losing to Omos.

==== Producer role and in-ring retirement (2022–present) ====
On September 29, 2022, it was reported that Roode underwent C5-C6 neck fusion surgery and would be out of action indefinitely. In May 2023, Roode underwent C4-C5 cervical fusion. In August, Roode transitioned from being an active competitor to taking on the role of a match producer. On February 22, 2024, Roode stated in an interview on Insight with Chris Van Vliet that despite having been medically cleared to compete, a return was simply not going to happen, effectively announcing his retirement from in-ring competition. On September 16, 2025, at NXT Homecoming, Roode made his first appearance in three years, sharing a segment with Joe Hendry and No Quarter Catch Crew backstage.

== Other media ==
Roode made his video game debut in 2008's TNA Impact! and also appeared in its sequels TNA Wrestling (2009), TNA Impact!: Cross The Line (2010) and TNA Wrestling Impact! (2011). He made his WWE video game debut in WWE 2K18 (2017), later appearing in WWE 2K19 (2018), WWE 2K20 (2019), WWE 2K Battlegrounds (2020), WWE 2K22 (2022), WWE 2K23 (2023) and most recently WWE 2K24 (2024).

=== Video games ===
Year	Title	Role	Notes
2008	TNA Impact!	Himself	Playable character
2010	TNA Impact!: Cross The Line	Himself	Playable character
2011	TNA Wrestling Impact!	Himself	Playable character
2017	WWE 2K18	Himself	Playable character
2018	WWE 2K19	Himself	Playable character
2019	WWE 2K20	Himself	Playable character
2020	WWE 2K Battlegrounds	Himself	Playable character
2022	WWE 2K22	Himself	Playable character
2023	WWE 2K23	Himself	Playable character
2024	WWE 2K24	Himself	Playable character

== Personal life ==
Roode and his wife Tracey have three children: Robert III, Riley, and Nicholas. He is a childhood friend of professional lacrosse player Tracey Kelusky. Roode attended Kenner Collegiate Vocational Institute in Peterborough, Ontario.

== Championships and accomplishments ==
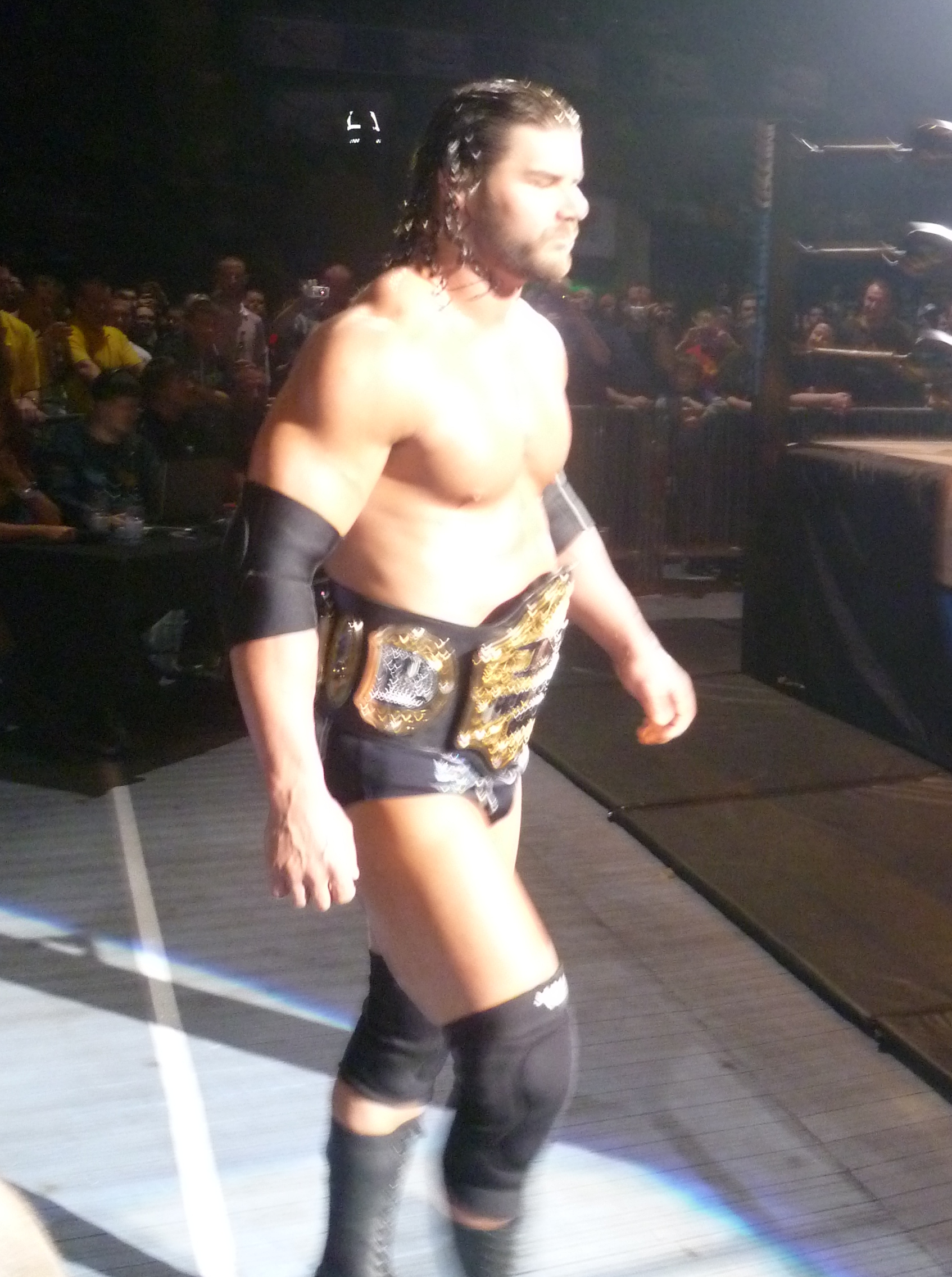
Roode is a two-time TNA World Heavyweight Champion

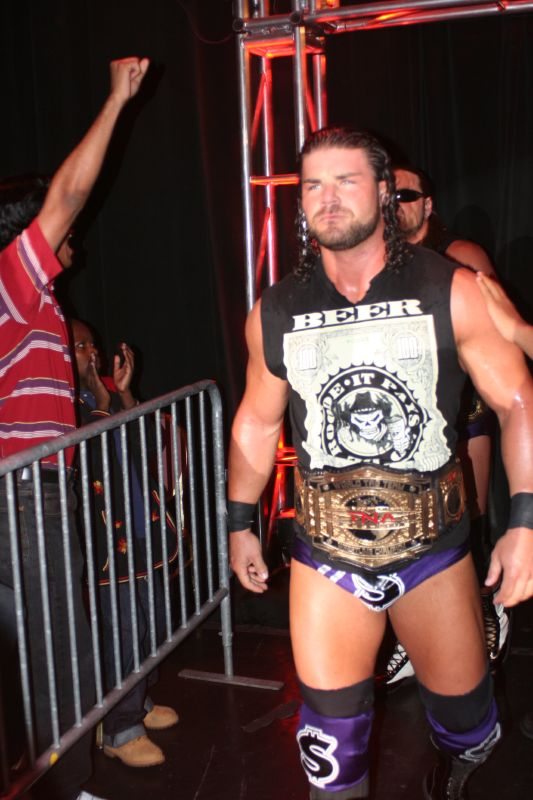
Roode is an eight-time (six TNA and two NWA) World Tag Team Champion in TNA

- The Baltimore Sun
  - Tag Team of the Year (2009) – with James Storm
- Border City Wrestling
  - BCW Can-Am Heavyweight Championship (1 time)
  - BCW Can-Am Tag Team Championship (1 time) – with Petey Williams
- Canadian Pro-Wrestling Hall of Fame
  - Class of 2023 – as member of Beer Money, Inc.
- NWA Shockwave
  - NWA Cyberspace Heavyweight Championship (1 time)
  - NWA Shockwave Internet Championship (1 time)
- Prime Time Wrestling
  - PTW Heavyweight Championship (2 times, final)
- Pro Wrestling Illustrated
  - Tag Team of the Year (2008, 2011) with James Storm
  - Ranked No. 2 of the top 500 singles wrestlers in the PWI 500 in 2012
- Real Action Wrestling
  - RAW Heavyweight Championship (4 times)
- Total Nonstop Action Wrestling
  - TNA World Heavyweight Championship (2 times)
  - TNA King of the Mountain Championship (1 time)
  - TNA World Tag Team Championship (6 times) – with James Storm (5) and Austin Aries (1)
  - NWA World Tag Team Championship (2 times) – with Eric Young
  - Bound for Glory Series (2011)
  - Team 3D Invitational Tag Team Tournament (2009) – with James Storm
  - TNA Tag Team Championship Series (2010) – with James Storm
  - TNA Tournament of Champions (2013)
  - TNA Year End Award (1 time)
    - Mr. TNA (2014)
- Twin Wrestling Entertainment
  - TWE Heavyweight Championship (1 time)
- Universal Wrestling Alliance
  - UWA Heavyweight Championship (2)
  - UWA Tag Team Championship (1 time) – with Petey Williams
- Wrestling Observer Newsletter
  - Worst Worked Match of the Year (2006) Reverse battle royal on Impact!
- WWE
  - NXT Championship (1 time)
  - WWE United States Championship (1 time)
  - WWE 24/7 Championship (1 time)
  - WWE SmackDown Tag Team Championship (1 time) – with Dolph Ziggler
  - WWE Raw Tag Team Championship (2 times) – with Chad Gable (1) and Dolph Ziggler (1)
  - WWE United States Championship Tournament (2017–2018)
