= TNA Wrestling Impact! =

2011 video game

- Developer: Namco Networks
- Publisher: Namco Networks
- Platforms: iOS, Android
- Release: iOS; May 19, 2011; Android; June 3, 2011
- Genre: Sports
- Mode: Single-player

TNA Wrestling Impact! (styled TNA Wrestling iMPACT!) is a mobile professional wrestling video game released by Namco Networks in 2011. It is based on the professional wrestling promotion Total Nonstop Action Wrestling (TNA). Unlike TNA Wrestling, the previous mobile game based on TNA, TNA Wrestling Impact features 3D graphics and is more action-oriented than its predecessor. The game was released for both iOS and Android devices. The game has received mixed reviews, with criticism directed at the game's presentation and controls. It is no longer available for download on the iTunes App Store or Google Play Store.

== Gameplay ==
Rob Van Dam wrestles against Kurt Angle. The buttons on the bottom right of screen represent what actions can currently be performed, while the virtual gamepad on the bottom left can control movement.

The game made use of the touch screen of iOS and Android devices by providing a virtual control pad for movement and three buttons for grapples, attacks and other in-ring actions. The actions that were available to the player were determined by the current in-ring situation - for example, pressing the attack button near a downed wrestler resulted in a stomp to the opponent's closest body part. The game also featured an option that allowed players to create an original wrestler.

Players could enter career mode to contend for one of three TNA titles: the TNA World Heavyweight Championship, the TNA X Division Championship or the TNA World Tag Team Championship. Match types included cage matches and submission matches.

== Reception ==
Reception

Aggregate score
Aggregator	Score
Metacritic	53/100

Review scores
Publication	Score
GamePro	2/5
Pocket Gamer	3.5/5
TouchArcade	3/5

The iOS version received "mixed" reviews according to the review aggregation website Metacritic. Harry Slater of Pocket Gamer criticized the pace as well as the repetitiveness of the game, but described the game as fun and as a good representation of pro wrestling as a whole.

== See also ==
- List of licensed wrestling video games
