= TNA Wrestling (video game) =

2008 video game

- Developer: Longtail Studios
- Publisher: Advanced Mobile Applications
- Platforms: Mobile phone, iOS
- Release: Verizon Wireless; August 7, 2008; iOS; March 30, 2009
- Genres: Turn-based strategy, role-playing
- Mode: Single-player

TNA Wrestling is a 2008 video game for Verizon Wireless devices by Canadian developer Longtail Studios. It is based on the professional wrestling promotion Total Nonstop Action Wrestling (TNA). Unlike most other professional wrestling games, the gameplay in TNA Wrestling is based on turn-based strategy with role-playing elements. The game garnered largely positive reviews and was re-released in early 2009 for iOS. It is no longer available for download on the iTunes Store and has been superseded by an unrelated game released by Namco Bandai called TNA Wrestling Impact!.

== Gameplay ==
Kevin Nash, Sting, Booker T and Abyss face each other in a match. The attacks in the game were selected via a menu system at the bottom of the screen.

The core of the game is its story mode, which allowed players to create their own wrestler and take him through his professional wrestling career. Players started out backyard wrestling and worked their way through the ranks of TNA, fighting and interacting with other wrestlers and crafting either a heroic or villainous personality. The player character was gradually leveled up to gain experience points, which could be used to acquire new moves. In addition to the story mode, a quick match option was available offering several different match types and the ability to play as actual members of the TNA roster.

During matches, wrestlers took turns attacking. Moves were selected via a menu and could be used in combos. Powerful special moves were also available and could be executed through quick time events.

== Reception ==
Reception

Aggregate score
| Aggregator | Score |
|---|---|
| GameRankings | 78% |

Review scores
| Publication | Score |
|---|---|
| Destructoid | 7.5/10 |
| IGN | 7/10 |
| Pocket Gamer | 4/5 |

The game received favorable reviews according to the review aggregation website GameRankings. Chris Plante of UGO Networks gave it an A−, lauding the turn-based gameplay as a good fit for mobile devices and praising the game's story mode and customization features. Levi Buchanan of IGN was not as positive, saying that the match gameplay was not fun and that the game is a better RPG than a wrestling game, but praised the game's story mode. Brad Nicholson of Destructoid gave a favorable review of the game. While citing the match gameplay as a weak point of the title, he also praised the game's story mode.

== See also ==
- List of licensed wrestling video games
