= TNA Today =

- Genre: Sports entertainment
- Presented by: Jeremy Borash
- Starring: Total Nonstop Action Wrestling roster
- Country of origin: United States

Production
- Camera setup: Single-camera setup
- Running time: Approximately 10 to 30 minutes per episode

Original release
- Network: YouTube; TNAWrestling.com (Webcast)
- Release: March 6, 2007 – March 21, 2011
- Release: June 12, 2012

Related
- TNA Global Impact! (2006); TNA Xplosion (2002–2021, 2024–present); TNA Impact! (2004–present); TNA Gut Check (2004–present); TNA British Boot Camp (2013–2014); Before the Impact (2021–2023)

TNA Today is an online professional wrestling program that was produced by Total Nonstop Action Wrestling (TNA). It was hosted by interviewer Jeremy Borash, with occasional appearances by Don West. The show purported to feature "exclusive footage, interviews, previews, reviews, news updates, merchandise deals and more," and was, in fact, used as a supplement to TNA's main program, Impact Wrestling (now known as TNA Impact!), and was used to further angles, debut wrestlers, and advertise merchandising deals (generally good for one day).

== History ==
Before the debut of TNA Today, TNA had a number of other internet exclusive shows, including TNA Global Impact! and audio only podcasts. In 2007, the company debuted "Hot News Updates" on their websites, which eventually came together as TNA Today. The show is mostly hosted on YouTube, though for a short time the TNA account was suspended for unspecified reasons and the show was uploaded to MySpace TV until the suspension was lifted.

In the September 14, 2007 edition, it was shown that TNA Today was YouTube's #1 video of the day 13 times in the month of August 2007. On April 27, 2010, the show began airing live every weekday on TNA's official website.

=== TNA En Espanol ===
In 2008, a Spanish-language version of TNA Today debuted on TNA's website hosted by Spanish-language announcer Willie Urbina. The program also featured exclusive interviews conducted by his broadcast partner Hector Guerrero.

=== Spin Cycle ===
In May 2008, TNA added a new web cast called TNA Spin Cycle, a roundtable discussion between employees of TNA Wrestling discussing different topics. Jeremy Borash hosted the show while Shark Boy or The Beautiful People run the "Dirty Laundry" segment.

=== Hermie's Hotseat ===
Beginning March 27, 2009, former NASCAR driver and politician Hermie Sadler debuted a web cast called Hermie's Hotseat, which features a candid sit-down interview with various TNA performers and employees.

=== TNAtion ===
In 2009, TNA launched a TNAtion website dedicated to promoting and marketing TNA programming and products. SoCal Val and Consequences Creed co-host a web cast along with Alex Abrahantes that includes a TNA Impact! recap, questions and answers from TNA performers, and behind the scenes information about using the TNAtion website. Alex Abrahantes was the man behind the creation and day-to-day operations of the program.

=== Pillow Talk ===
In December 2010, SoCal Val debuted a web cast called Pillow Talk, which featured a candid sit-down interview with various TNA performers and employees.

=== iMPACT Xtra ===
In November 2010, TNA launched the weekly iMPACT Xtra, which featured exclusive unseen footage from TNA iMPACT! that never aired on Spike.

=== TNA Today return ===
On June 7, 2012, during the TNA Impact Wrestling post-show, Jeremy Borash announced that TNA Today would return airing during the week having shows on Monday through Wednesday. The show officially returned June 12, 2012. Guests that have appeared on TNA Today include Bobby Roode, Joseph Park, Austin Aries, Billy Corgan, Bob Ryder, Brooke Tessmacher, Madison Rayne, Al Snow, Robbie E, Mike Tenay, Jeff Hardy, and former TNA President Dixie Carter.

== Special features ==
TNA Today commonly featured matches culled from Xplosion, as well as recaps of videos featured during the main TNA Impact! broadcasts. In September 2007, TNA took a new approach, having Jeremy Borash approach ringside at the end of the show and pick up briefly where the show left off. While providing a new perspective, this did not really change much of the material of the show, as Borash's occasional attempts for immediate interviews were often ignored. Alternate locations for the hosting of the show included on-site appearances in towns hosting pay-per-view events or fan festivals.

TNA Today also featured exclusives that were not available on mainstream television. The most common feature was the revelation of new products and deals, such as upcoming merchandise (T-shirts, action figures, DVDs, etc.) and Don West's "Insane Deals". In addition, TNA Today offered interviews not available on any other show, which varies between established wrestlers (such as Frankie Kazarian), newcomers making their TNA debut (such as Talia Madison and Angel Williams), and even several exclusive appearances from former TNA President Dixie Carter, who did not otherwise appear on TNA programming other than an occasional cameo appearance in the crowd.

Following the establishment of the new TNA World Championships, TNA Today held a special feature in which management director Jim Cornette presented Kurt Angle, Team 3D, and Chris Sabin with the reworked versions of the TNA World Heavyweight Championship, TNA World Tag Team Championship, and TNA X Division Championship, respectively. On the 12/31 edition, live in Oshawa, Ontario, Jeremy Borash said that people in the TNA office were thinking about having a TNA PPV in Canada.
