= TNA Gut Check =

- Also known as: Impact Wrestling Gut Check (2017–2024)
- Genre: Professional wrestling
- Created by: Jeff Jarrett
- Starring: Indy rookie wrestlers
- Judges: D'Lo Brown; Pat Kenney; Brian Hebner; Jeremy Borash; Bruce Prichard; Al Snow; Tazz; Danny Davis; John E. Bravo; Lance Storm
- Countries of origin: United States; Canada
- Original language: English
- No. of seasons: 5

Production
- Camera setup: Multi-camera setup
- Production company: Total Nonstop Action Wrestling (2004–2015; 2022–present)

Original release
- Network: Fox Sports Net (2004–2005); Webcast (2005); Urban America Television (2005); Spike (2005–2014); Destination America (2015)
- Release: October 16, 2004 – present

Related
- TNA Impact! (2004–present); TNA Global Impact! (2006); TNA Today (2007); TNA Xplosion (2002–2021, 2024-present); TNA British Boot Camp (2013–2014); Before the Impact (2021–2023)

In professional wrestling, the TNA Gut Check (formerly known as the Impact Wrestling Gut Check) was a tryout program turned indy wrestling rookies reality series that was produced by the American professional wrestling promotion Total Nonstop Action Wrestling (TNA), as a means of recruiting new talent. The TNA Wrestling Gut Check was featured as a segment on occasional episodes of the company's flagship television program of the same name. The TNA Wrestling Gut Check has also been used as an TNA One Night Only pay-per-view event on February 16, 2015.

== Seminars ==
TNA staged its first "Gut Check" on October 16, 2004, in Atlanta, Georgia. The event saw entrants rated on the basis of their performance in five categories: "back bump", "mat techniques", "ring interviews", "running the ropes" and "squat challenge". The female and male events were won by Jaime Dauncey and Jon Bolen respectively, with Dauncey and Bolen rewarded with a $4,000 USD cash prize and a subsequent appearance on TNA programming. In 2005, Dauncey was signed to a developmental deal by TNA.

TNA holds seminars at venues around the United States and Canada, hosted by TNA backstage employees such as D'Lo Brown, Pat Kenney, Brian Hebner and Jeremy Borash. The seminars, which last two hours, cover "promos, drills, simulated matches and in-ring work". The seminars are aimed at "prospective professional wrestlers, announcers, managers, valets and referees". Participation in the seminars costs US$250.

A number of wrestlers have been awarded contracts with TNA after participating in Gut Check Seminars, including Crimson and Jesse Sorensen. From April 2012 onwards, TNA began inviting a small number of participants in the seminars to wrestle a tryout match on Impact Wrestling.

On February 3, 2022, Impact announced the return of the Gut Check, a one-day camp at the Arnold Classic on March 6, which was held by John E. Bravo and Lance Storm. The winner of the Gut Check was awarded an Impact Wrestling contract.

== Television segment (April 2012–July 2013) ==
In April 2012, Gut Check began being featured as a regular segment on Impact Wrestling as part of each month's Open Fight Night episode. Contestants wrestled a match against a TNA wrestler, after which their performance was evaluated by three judges. Contestants who received a "yes" from at least two of the judges were awarded a contract with TNA and sent to Ohio Valley Wrestling, TNA's developmental territory, for further training.

On January 9, 2013, it was announced by TNA that the Gut Check segment would be overhauled with two contestants competing against each other instead of one contestant competing against a TNA wrestler.

The original judges for the TNA Gut Check were Ric Flair, the road agent Al Snow and TNA's Senior Vice President of Programming and Talent Relations, Bruce Prichard. On May 31, 2012, Flair, who would leave the company shortly thereafter, was replaced by the color commentator and retired wrestler Taz. On the November 29, 2012, episode of Impact Wrestling, Al Snow was replaced by D'Lo Brown for the night. On the March 7, 2013, episode of Impact Wrestling, Taz was replaced by Danny Davis.

TNA Gut Check contestants have featured in a number of angles:

- After Joey Ryan was refused a contract on the May 31, 2012, episode of Impact Wrestling, he began a campaign against the decision on Twitter and YouTube that was spearheaded by the results of an online poll showing that 87% of respondents felt that he should have been awarded a contract. Beginning on the June 28 episode of Impact Wrestling, Ryan began appearing in the audience of the Impact Wrestling Zone during Gut Check segments, heckling the judges. On July 21, 2012, at the Pro Wrestling Guerrilla show "Threemendous III", Ryan used the Tazmission - the signature submission hold of Taz - to defeat his opponent, Famous B. At Bound for Glory 2012 on October 14, 2012, Ryan defeated Snow to receive a contract with TNA.
- On the July 19, 2012, episode of Impact Wrestling, Sam Shaw was attacked by the Aces & Eights stable while being interviewed by Jeremy Borash. Shaw went on to wrestle Douglas Williams in a tryout match one week later.

Gut Check was cancelled when Bruce Pritchard was fired from TNA. At the same time, TNA launched a new online contest called Online Gut Check with hundreds of wrestlers where the fans voted for the winner. However, due to poor design it was possible for fans to post multiple votes for the same wrestler. The winner was German wrestler Bad Bones. In January 2014, Bad Bones was confirmed to appear in TNA Maximum Impact tour.

=== Contestants ===
==== April 2012–November 2012 ====
Contestants	Tryouts dates	Opponents	Decisions dates	Bruce Prichard	Al Snow	Tazz	Decisions	References
Alex Silva	April 26, 2012	Robbie E	May 3, 2012	Yes	Yes	(Ric Flair^{1}), Yes	Successful	
Joey Ryan	May 24, 2012	Austin Aries	May 31, 2012	No	Yes	No	Unsuccessful	
Taeler Hendrix	June 21, 2012	Tara	June 28, 2012	Yes	No	Yes	Successful	
Sam Shaw	July 26, 2012	Douglas Williams	July 26, 2012	Yes	No	Yes	Successful	
Kris Lewie	August 23, 2012	Gunner	August 30, 2012	No	N/A^{2}	No	Unsuccessful	
Evan Markopoulos	September 20, 2012	Douglas Williams	September 27, 2012	No	No	Yes	Unsuccessful	
Christian York	November 1, 2012	Zema Ion	November 8, 2012	Yes	Yes^{3}	Yes	Successful	
Wes Brisco	November 22, 2012	Garett Bischoff^{4}	November 29, 2012	Yes	(D'Lo Brown^{5}), Yes	No	Successful	

^{1}Flair served as the third judge for the inaugural Gut Check before being replaced by Taz.
^{2}As Lewie had already received two "no" votes, Snow was not required to cast his vote.
^{3}As York had already received two "yes" votes, Snow was not required to cast his vote. However, commentator Mike Tenay described York as having received a unanimous "yes" vote.
^{4}Brisco was the only contestant to win their tryout match
^{5}Brown substituted for Snow.

==== January 2013–July 2013 ====
Contestants #1	Contestants #2	Tryouts dates	Decisions dates	Judge's pick	Bruce Prichard	Al Snow	Danny Davis	Decisions	References
Jay Bradley	Brian Cage	January 10, 2013	January 17, 2013	Jay Bradley	Yes	Yes	(Tazz^{1}), No	Successful	
Ivelisse Vélez	Lei'D Tapa	February 28, 2013	March 7, 2013	Lei'D Tapa	No	Yes	Yes	Successful	
Adam Pearce	Magno	March 28, 2013 (aired April 4, 2013)	April 11, 2013	Magno	No	N/A^{2}	No	Unsuccessful	
Adam Ohriner	Ryan Howe	June 20, 2013 (aired June 27, 2013)	July 4, 2013	Ryan Howe	No	No	Yes	Unsuccessful	

^{1}Tazz served as the third judge for the revamped Gut Check before being replaced by Davis.
^{2}As Magno had already received two "no" votes, Snow was not required to cast his vote.

== One Night Only ==
=== TNA Gut Check ===
TNA Gut Check
- Promotion: Total Nonstop Action Wrestling
- Date: February 16, 2015
- City: Orlando, Florida
- Venue: Impact Zone
- Attendance: 1,100

One Night Only chronology
← Previous; TBA	Next → TBA

TNA held a series of matches featuring ten Gut Check participants competing in singles matches and tag matches against ten members of the active roster: if they would win, they would move on to compete in the main event match where the winner of that match earns an appearance on the next live Impact Wrestling. It took place on February 16, 2015, from Universal Studios in Orlando, Florida; it was a part of TNA One Night Only's pay-per view events.

No.	Matches	Stipulations
1	Martin Stone defeated Jessie Godderz	Singles match; if Martin Stone wins, he qualifies for the final match later that night
2	MVP defeated Jon Davis	Singles match; if Jon Davis won, he qualifies for the final match later that night
3	The Revolution (James Storm and Manik) defeated The Von Erichs (Marshall Von Erich and Ross Von Erich)	Tag Team match; if The Von Erichs won, they qualify for the final match later that night
4	Shaun Ricker defeated Crazzy Steve	Singles match; if Shaun Ricker won, he qualifies for the final match later that night
5	Davey Richards defeated Tony Kozina	Singles match; if Tony Kozina won, he qualifies for the final match later that night
6	Crimson defeated Samuel Shaw	Singles match; if Crimson won, he qualifies for the final match later that night
7	Tevita Fifita defeated Ethan Carter III by disqualification	Singles match; if Tevita Fifita won, he qualifies for the final match later that night
8	Drew Galloway defeated Pepper Parks	Singles match; if Pepper Parks won, he qualifies for the final match later that night
9	Dalton Castle defeated DJZ	Singles match; if Dalton Castle won, he qualifies for the final match later that night
10	Tevita Fifita defeated Shaun Ricker, Martin Stone, Dalton Castle and Crimson	Five-way elimination match

== Revival ==
On February 3, 2022, Impact announced the return of the Gut Check, a one-day camp at the Arnold Classic on March 6, which was held by John E. Bravo and Lance Storm. The winner of the Gut Check was awarded an Impact Wrestling contract.

On March 7, 2022, Impact Wrestling announced two Gut Check winners, Jason Hotch and Jack Price, and they were awarded Impact Wrestling contracts. On September 26, 2023, Impact announced the return of the Gut Check during their UK Invasion Tour on October 25 and 29, where the winners would receive a developmental contract. On October 29, it was confirmed that Harley Hudson won the Gut Check. It was later also confirmed that Mike D has also won the Gut Check.

== Winners ==
Year Won	Contestant Winners
2004	Jaime Dauncey
2004	Jon Bolen
2012	Alex Silva
2012	Taeler Hendrix
2012	Sam Shaw
2012	Christian York
2012	Wes Brisco
2013	Jay Bradley
2013	Lei'D Tapa
2015	Tevita Fifita
2020	Shogun
2022	Jason Hotch
2022	Jack Price
2023	Harley Hudson
2023	Mike D

== See also ==
- WWE LFG
- WWE Tough Enough
