= TNA British Boot Camp =

British reality TV show (2013–14)

- Genre: Reality television
- Starring: See below
- Country of origin: United Kingdom
- Original language: English
- No. of seasons: 2
- No. of episodes: 14

Production
- Executive producer: Jeremy Borash
- Production locations: Orlando, Florida, United States; London, United Kingdom; Manchester, United Kingdom; Nashville, Tennessee, United States; Louisville, Kentucky, United States
- Running time: 30 minutes (season 1); 60 minutes (season 2)
- Production company: TNA Productions

Original release
- Network: Challenge
- Release: 1 January 2013 – 7 December 2014

Related
- TNA Impact! (2004–present); TNA Xplosion (2002–2021, 2024-present); TNA Gut Check (2004–present); TNA Global Impact! (2006); TNA Today (2007); Before the Impact (2021–2023)

TNA British Boot Camp was a British reality television programme focusing on the professional wrestling industry. The programme documented the careers of four British professional wrestlers seeking a contract with the American professional wrestling promotion Total Nonstop Action Wrestling (TNA). The series was commissioned from TNA Productions by Sky UK and started airing on Challenge from 1 January 2013.

TNA British Boot Camp was both the first non-game show commissioned for Challenge by BSkyB and the first American professional wrestling programme exclusively created and broadcast for the British market. The commissioning of the series reflected a commitment by BSkyB to invest £600 million in British-made television content by 2014. The programme's executive producer was veteran TNA ring announcer Jeremy Borash, who created the show and edited the programme himself.

== Season 1 ==
=== Synopsis ===
The programme followed "four of Britain's most promising wrestlers" - Rockstar Spud, Marty Scurll and The Blossom Twins - who competed to receive a contract from TNA. The wrestlers were mentored by veteran professional wrestlers such as Hulk Hogan and Rollerball Rocco.

In the season finale of British Boot Camp, which aired on 22 January 2013, Rockstar Spud was named the winner, receiving a contract with TNA. Following the finale, all four wrestlers performed with TNA as part of the "Road to Lockdown" tour of the United Kingdom and Ireland.

=== Cast ===
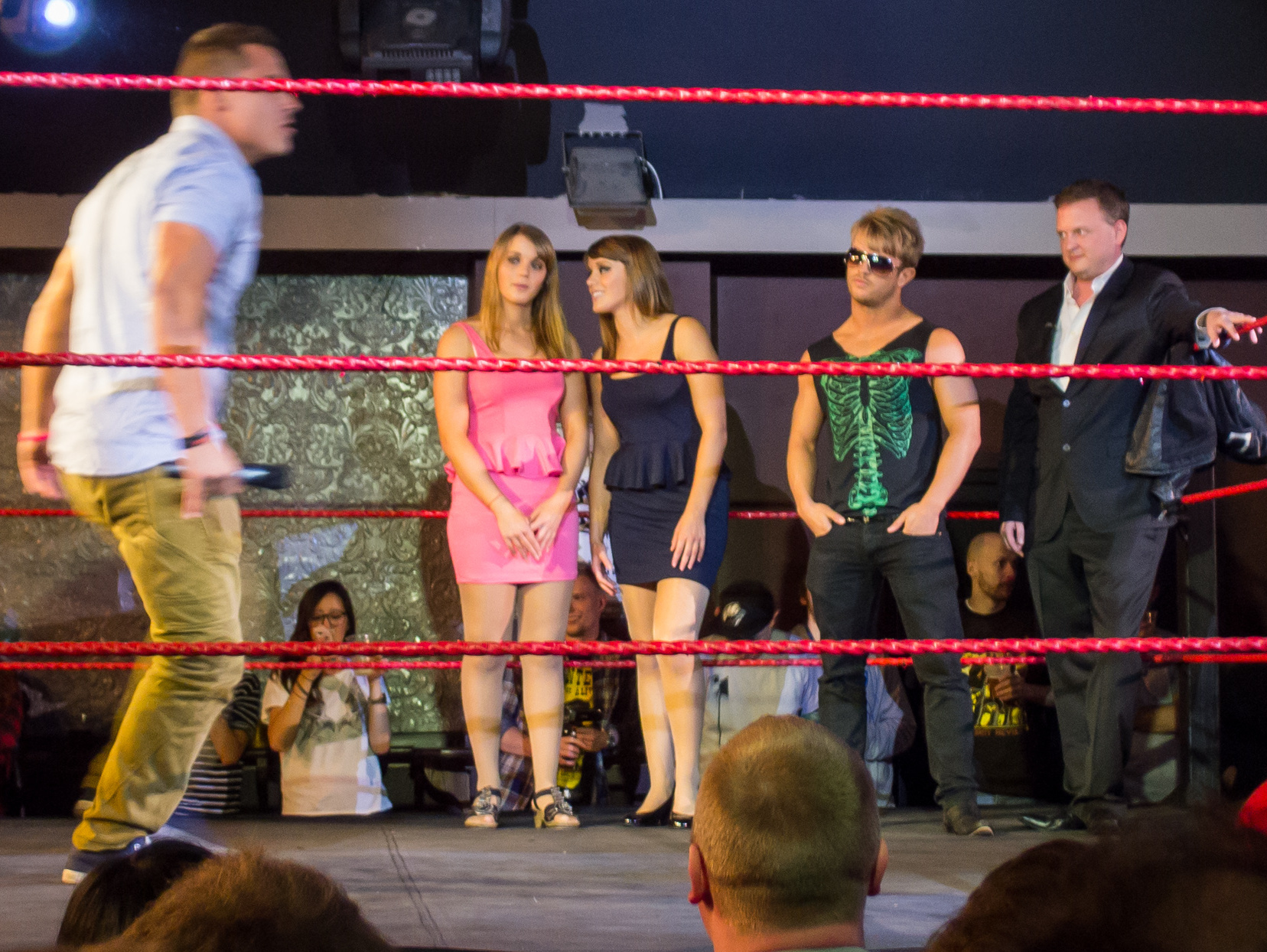
The contestants on British Boot Camp, from left to right, Marty Scurll, The Blossom Twins, and Rockstar Spud, with Jeremy Borash (far right).

==== Contestants ====
- Hannah Blossom
- Holly Blossom
- Marty Scurll
- Rockstar Spud (Winner)

==== Mentors ====
- Al Snow
- Doug Williams
- Rollerball Rocco

==== Other wrestling personalities ====
- Dixie Carter
- Hulk Hogan
- James Storm
- Kurt Angle
- Magnus
- Jeremy Borash

=== Production ===
TNA announced on 5 September 2012 that it had completed filming of TNA Wrestling: British Boot Camp. The series was originally scheduled to air in December 2012, but was moved back to January 2013.

=== Reception ===
The programme was described as "a ratings hit for Challenge TV". Rob Leigh of the Daily Mirror stated that "the show's post-reality show format is bang up to date".

== Season 2 ==
=== Synopsis ===
The programme followed "twelve of Britain's most promising wrestlers" who competed to receive a contract from TNA. It premiered on Challenge, on 19 October 2014.

=== Cast ===
==== Contestants ====
Ring Name	Real Name	From	Stage 1	Stage 2	Finals (London)
Babyfaced Pitbull	Sam Smitten-Downes	Leicester, England	Advanced to Stage 2	Eliminated	
Cyanide	Alex Walmsley	Manchester, England	Eliminated		
Dave Mastiff	David Minton	Dudley, England	Advanced to Stage 2	Advanced to the Finals	Final six
El Ligero	Simon Musk	Leeds, England	Advanced to Stage 2	Advanced to the Finals	
Grado	Graeme Stevely	Ayrshire, Scotland	Advanced to Stage 2	Advanced to the Finals - was given a 2nd chance after being eliminated	Final six
Joe Vega	Joseph Whittaker	Preston, England	Eliminated		
Joel Redman	Joel Pettyfer	Exeter, England	Advanced to Stage 2	Advanced to the Finals	
King Rorster	Rory Bailey	Burton, England	Eliminated		
Kris Travis	Kristoffer Travis	Sheffield, England	Advanced to Stage 2	Advanced to the Finals	
Mark Andrews	Mark Andrews	Cardiff, Wales	Advanced to Stage 2	Advanced to the Finals	WINNER
Martin Stone	Martin Harris	London, England	Advanced to Stage 2	Advanced to the Finals	
Matt Fox	Matthew McNamara	St. Helens, England	Eliminated		
Noam Dar	Noam Dar	Ayrshire, Scotland	Advanced to Stage 2	Advanced to the Finals	Final six
Nordic Warrior	Tom Newton	Manchester, England	Eliminated		
Priscilla	Ollie Burns	Leeds, England	Advanced to Stage 2	Eliminated	
Pyro	Unknown	Manchester, England	Advanced to Stage 2	Eliminated	
Rampage Brown	Oliver Biney	Leeds, England	Advanced to Stage 2	Advanced to the Finals	Final three
Richard Parliament	Richard Varty	London, England	Advanced to Stage 2	Advanced to the Finals	
RJ Singh	Ross Jones	Hertford, England	Advanced to Stage 2	Advanced to the Finals	
Sexy Kev	Kevin Lloyd	Warrington, England	Eliminated		
Sha Samuels	Shaaheen Hosseinpour	East London, England	Advanced to Stage 2	Advanced to the Finals	
Simon Lancaster	Simon Lancaster	Grimsby, England	Advanced to Stage 2	Eliminated	
Heather Schofield	Heather Schofield	London, England	Eliminated		
Kay Lee Ray	Kayleigh Ray	Glasgow, Scotland	Advanced to Stage 2	Advanced to the Finals	Final three
Melanie Price	Melanie Conneely	Manchester, England	Advanced to Stage 2	Eliminated	
Lana Austin	Leanne Austin	Manchester, England	Advanced to Stage 2	Eliminated	
Kasey Owens	Kelly Robinson	Belfast, Northern Ireland	Advanced to Stage 2	Advanced to the Finals	
Leah Owens	Leigh Robinson	Belfast, Northern Ireland	Advanced to Stage 2	Advanced to the Finals	
Nikki Storm	Nicola Glencross	Glasgow, Scotland	Advanced to Stage 2	Advanced to the Finals	
Viper	Kimberly Benson	Ayrshire, Scotland	Advanced to Stage 2	Eliminated	

==== Mentors ====
- Al Snow
- Gail Kim
- Samoa Joe

==== Other wrestling personalities ====
- Jeremy Borash
- Rockstar Spud

== Winners ==
Year Won	Winners
2013	Rockstar Spud
2014	Mark Andrews

== See also ==
- Professional wrestling in the United Kingdom
- TNA Gut Check
- WWE Diva Search
- WWE Tough Enough
