= SoCal Val =

American professional wrestler and manager

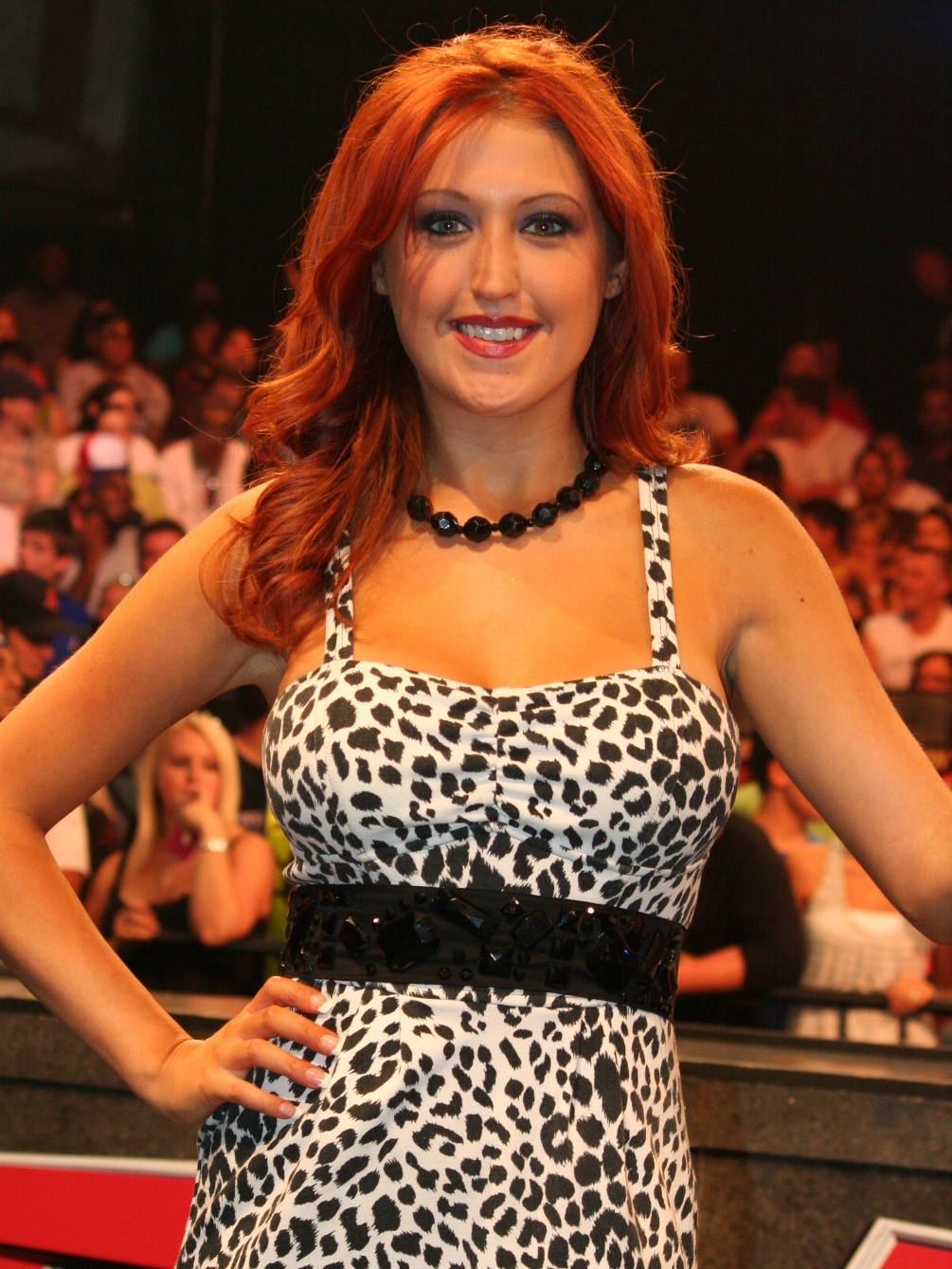
- SoCal Val in July 2010

Personal information
- Born: Paige Nicole Mayo; March 27, 1986 (age 40) Texas, U.S.
- Website: http://valeriewyndham.net/fashion/

Professional wrestling career
- Ring name(s): Miss Valerie; SoCal Val; SoCal Valerie; Valerie; Valerie Elizabeth Wyndham; Valerie Wyndham
- Billed height: 5 ft 7 in (1.70 m)
- Billed weight: 105 lb (48 kg)
- Billed from: Southern California
- Debut: 2002

Paige Nicole Mayo (born March 27, 1986) is an American professional wrestling valet, occasional professional wrestler, interviewer, ring announcer, model and ringside attendant who is better known by her ring name SoCal Val.

== Professional wrestling career ==
=== Independent circuit (2002–present) ===
Mayo was approached by a promoter at a wrestling show and offered the possibility of being a manager. She debuted in March 2002 for the Golden State Championship Wrestling independent promotion in Anaheim, California. She acted as the manager of Pinoy Boy. She promptly betrayed him by berating him after he was defeated by Scott Lost and then left with Lost. From the age of fifteen, she acted as a manager, ring girl, and timekeeper. She appeared for several other promotions in Southern California before her family moved across the country to Orlando, Florida when she was sixteen. Mayo developed the character of SoCal Val, a wealthy, petulant, ruthless villain, who was based on Stephanie McMahon of World Wrestling Entertainment (WWE), whom Mayo admired.

In addition to working for multiple independent promotions, Mayo appeared with WWE in early 2005 on SmackDown! as part of a vignette featuring Luther Reigns. She regularly appeared with the Orlando-based promotion TNA Wrestling, working variously as a ring girl and merchandise model beginning in June 2005. She appeared at TNA's No Surrender pay-per-view on July 17, 2005 alongside ring announcer Jeremy Borash and used to be an interviewer on the now defunct TNA Global Impact!.

As a part of Women's Extreme Wrestling (WEW), Val started out as an "executive" under Francine Fournier. Val later wrestled Francine in a Kiss My Foot match, which she lost. She later became the General Manager of WEW. In 2007, she starred in RingDivas second feature film, Girls of War.

=== Total Nonstop Action Wrestling (2006–2013) ===
In August 2006, SoCal Val officially signed with Total Nonstop Action Wrestling (TNA). On August 18, SoCal Val got kicked out by the Women's Extreme Wrestling promotion at their PPV taping event Twisted Steel and Sex Appeal. On the December 14, 2006 episode of Impact!, Kurt Angle dragged her in the ring and threatened to break her ankle until Jim Cornette talked him into letting her go. On the March 8, 2007 episode of Impact!, SoCal Val got injured after receiving the Black Hole Slam from Abyss.

In 2008, Val entered into an on-screen relationship with Jay Lethal with signs of Sonjay Dutt also showing affection for Val. Lethal lost his X Division championship to Petey Williams after a Canadian Destroyer on the April 17 episode of Impact!. As part of the storyline, at Slammiversary, Val was scheduled to marry Lethal, but their wedding was ruined when Sonjay Dutt claimed he should marry Val and attacked Lethal. At No Surrender, Val turned heel by giving Lethal a low blow, allowing Dutt to get the victory. In the following weeks, Val's actions were explained by transitioning her character into a gold digger, claiming that Dutt's father was the richest man in India. In 2009, Dutt was released thus ending the storyline.

She returned to her previous role as a ring girl on the April 2, 2009 edition of Impact!. She began working as a backstage interviewer beginning on the Sacrifice pre-show. On the October 8, 2009 edition of Impact!, Val was briefly assaulted by Awesome Kong, who had come to the ring during Tara's match against ODB with a sledgehammer that she intended to use to kill Tara's pet tarantula, Poison. Although Kong made Val position Poison on the floor outside the ring for her to smash with her sledgehammer, Tara was able to attack Kong and stop her from inflicting any damage.

In June 2010, Val began working as the ring announcer on Xplosion.

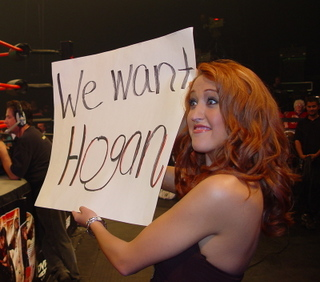
SoCal Val at a TNA event in 2007

On August 22, 2013, Mayo announced she had parted ways with TNA.

=== Shine Wrestling (2014–2016) ===
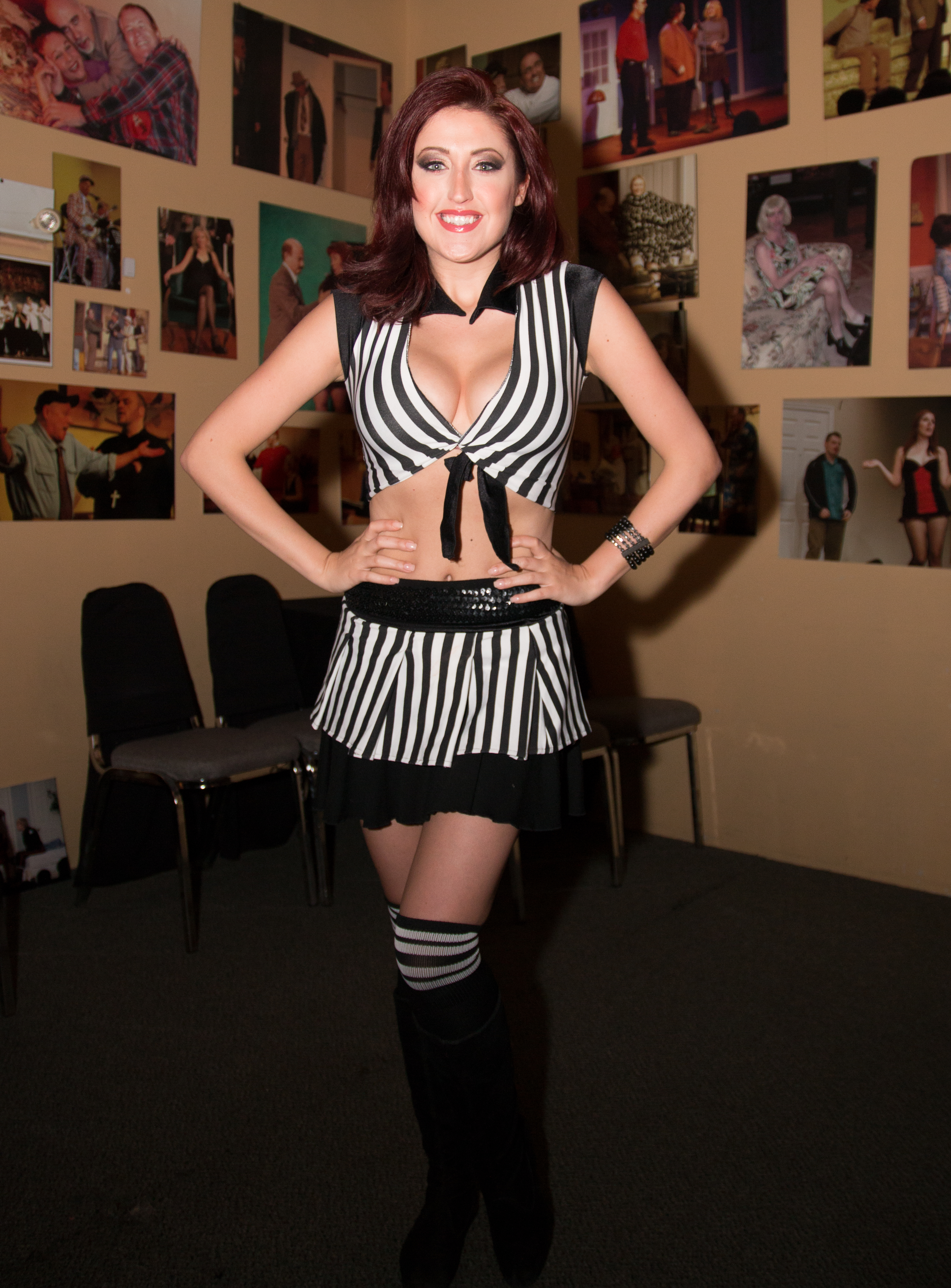
So Cal Val in 2014

Mayo joined the Shine Wrestling promotion under the SoCal Val name at SHINE 21 on August 22, 2014, where she debuted as an observer scouting various members of the roster. Val established herself as a villainous manager at SHINE 22 as she formed the stable, Valifornia, which consisted of Nevaeh, Marti Belle, and Jayme Jameson, who defeated Kellie Skater, Leva Bates, and Mia Yim at the event.

=== Return to TNA (2015) ===
In January 2015, Val returned to take part in TNA's tour of the United Kingdom, resuming her former duties as a ring announcer. She replaced Christy Hemme, who was unable to make the trip and was not expected to remain with the promotion following the tour.

=== World of Sport Wrestling (2018) ===
In May 2018, Val appeared as a hostess and commentator at tapings for Series 1 of UK television series World of Sport Wrestling. Her first episode debuted on July 28.

=== Maximum Pro Wrestling (2026) ===
As of 2026 she is the on-screen CEO of Maximum Pro Wrestling

== Other media ==
In July 2006, Val was contacted by Playboy about doing a centerfold for the magazine. She commented about it on her MySpace blog, saying: "It's a very serious thing to consider and the jury is still out on how I am going to handle this one. I've spoken to the people in my life whose opinions I value most, and each has been very supportive. For that I am grateful....but this is one I'm going to have to decide all on my own." She ended up declining the offer.

She has also been in advertisements for Morphoplex. In 2009, Val appeared in a video promo for the F.E.A.R. 2: Project Origin game, dressed as an Armacham FEAR AWAY nurse.

She appears as the ring announcer in the opening wrestling sequences of the 2013 film Pro Wrestlers vs. Zombies, which also stars Roddy Piper, Kurt Angle, Matt Hardy, Shane Douglas, and Hacksaw Jim Duggan.

In 2019, Val became a staff member of the YouTube channel "ScreenStalker", hosting the channel's movie news videos. Val has also hosted on the YouTube channel "Wrestletalk".

Val is a regular stage host for celebrity panels at fan conventions hosted by Monopoly Events, including Comic Con Liverpool and others, she frequently interviews popular guests and hosts question and answer panels between the guest and the audience.

== Personal life ==
On August 31, 2013, Mayo was arrested and charged with DUI and leaving the scene of an accident with property damage in Orlando. She was arrested and released the same day after posting bail of $600. She was later cited and charged with failing to yield to oncoming traffic when making a left turn from that incident. Mayo pled not guilty, with a third pre-trial conference scheduled for December 16, 2013, and a trial expected in January 2014, however there is no public information available for either of these events.
