= TNA Hall of Fame =

Professional wrestling hall of fame

- TNA HOF logo
- Established: May 31, 2012 (14 years ago)
- Founder: Total Nonstop Action Wrestling (TNA)
- Inductees: 13 individuals 2 groups (4 members) (16 total inductees)

The TNA Hall of Fame is a hall of fame that honors professional wrestlers and wrestling personalities who contributed to the history of the American based professional wrestling promotion Total Nonstop Action Wrestling (TNA).

It was established in 2012, and created as part of the celebration of the promotion's 10th anniversary. Inductees are usually announced at either the Slammiversary pay-per-view event or on episodes of TNA Impact!, and the ceremony takes place prior to Bound for Glory. It has been an annual tradition for TNA since 2012 with the exception of three years (2014, 2017 and 2019).

As of 2025, there have been 16 inducted in total; 13 individually, and two group inductions.

== Ceremony dates and locations ==
Date	Location	Venue	Associated event
October 13, 2012	Phoenix, Arizona	Pointe Hilton Tapatio Cliffs Resort	Bound for Glory
October 19, 2013	San Diego, California	San Diego Marriott Mission Valley	Bound for Glory
October 11, 2014	Tokyo, Japan	Korakuen Hall	Bound for Glory
June 27, 2015	Orlando, Florida	Universal Studios Florida	Impact Wrestling
October 3, 2015	Salem, Virginia	Salem Civic Center	Road to Bound for Glory Tour
October 2, 2016	Orlando, Florida	Universal Studios Florida	Bound for Glory
October 13, 2018	Manhattan, New York	McHale's Pub	Bound for Glory
October 24, 2020	Nashville, Tennessee	Skyway Studios	Bound for Glory
October 23, 2021	Sunrise Manor, Nevada	Sam's Town Live	Bound for Glory
October 7, 2022	Albany, New York	Washington Avenue Armory	Bound for Glory
October 21, 2023	Cicero, Illinois	Cicero Stadium	Bound for Glory
October 26, 2024	Detroit, Michigan	Wayne State Fieldhouse	Bound for Glory
October 12, 2025	Lowell, Massachusetts	Tsongas Center	Bound for Glory
October 11, 2026	Tampa, Florida	Yuengling Center	Bound for Glory

== Inductees ==
=== Individuals ===
Year	Image	Ring name (Birth name)	Inducted by	TNA recognized accolades
2012		Sting (Steve Borden)	Dixie Carter	One-time NWA World Heavyweight Champion; Four-time TNA World Heavyweight Champion; One-time TNA World Tag Team Champion
2013		Kurt Angle	Sting	Six-time TNA World Heavyweight Champion; One-time TNA X Division Champion; Two-time TNA World Tag Team Champion; Two-time King of the Mountain winner (2007, 2009); One-time IWGP Heavyweight Champion
2015		Jeff Jarrett	Dixie Carter	Co-founder of TNA; Six-time NWA World Heavyweight Champion; One-time TNA King of the Mountain Champion; One-time AAA Mega Champion; Three-time King of the Mountain winner (2004, 2006, 2015)
2015		Earl Hebner	Billy Corgan	TNA's senior referee from 2006 to 2017
2016		Gail Kim	Dixie Carter	Inaugural and seven-time TNA Knockouts Champion; One-time TNA Knockouts Tag Team Champion; Queen of the Knockouts winner (2013)
2018		Abyss (Christopher Parks)	Father James Mitchell	One-time NWA World Heavyweight Champion; Two-time TNA Television Champion; One-time TNA X Division Champion; Two-time TNA World Tag Team Champion; One-time NWA World Tag Team Champion; Fight for the Right Tournament winner (2006)
2020		Ken Shamrock	The Rock	One-time NWA World Heavyweight Champion; First World Champion in the promotion's history
2021		Awesome Kong (Kia Stevens)	Gail Kim	Two-time TNA Knockouts Champion; One-time TNA Knockouts Tag Team Champion; Queen of the Knockouts winner (2015)
2022		Raven (Scott Levy)	Tommy Dreamer	One-time NWA World Heavyweight Champion; King of the Mountain winner (2005)
2023		Traci Brooks (Tracy Brookshaw)	Gail Kim	Longtime manager/valet and wrestler Considered by TNA to be the original Knockout
2024		Rhino (Terry Gerin)	Tommy Dreamer	One-time NWA World Heavyweight Champion; Two-time TNA World Tag Team Champion
2024		Bob Ryder	Eric Young	Co-founder of and longtime executive for TNA Wrestling; Posthumous induction
2025		Mickie James	Tara	Five-time TNA Knockouts World Champion
2026		ODB (Jessica Kresa)	Traci Brooks and Al Snow	Four-time TNA Knockouts Champion; One-time TNA Knockouts Tag Team Champion; Two-time Gauntlet for the Gold winner (2008, 2017); 2010 New Year's Knockout Eve Tournament winner 2009 Queen of the Cage winner 2014 TNA World Cup of Wrestling winner
2026		Amazing Red (Jonathan Figueroa)	Frankie Kazarian	Three-time TNA X Division Champion; One-time NWA World Tag Team Champion; On the night of his induction, he won the TNA X Division Championship for the fourth time.
2026		Konnan (Charles Ashenoff)	Cruz Montana	Two-time NWA World Tag Team Championship

=== Group inductions ===
Year	Image	Group	Inducted by	TNA recognized accolades
2014		Team 3D	Kurt Angle	One-time NWA World Tag Team Champions; Two-time TNA World Tag Team Champions; Two-time IWGP Tag Team Champions; Recognized by TNA as 23-time World Tag Team Champions overall
2014		Bully Ray (Mark LoMonaco) – Two-time TNA World Heavyweight Champion. In 2022, Ray won the Call Your Shot Gauntlet; Devon (Devon Hughes) – Two-time TNA Television Champion		
2023		Don West and Mike Tenay	Scott D'Amore	TNA's original broadcast team (2002–2009)
2023		Tenay continued as an announcer until 2015. West went on to work in the TNA front office from 2009 until his death in 2022 and was inducted posthumously.		
2025		The Beautiful People	Tommy Dreamer	The founding members of The Beautiful People
2025		Angelina Love (Lauren Williams) – Six-time TNA Knockouts Champion and one-time TNA Knockouts Tag Team Champion; Velvet Sky (Jamie Szantyr) – Two-time TNA Knockouts Champion, one-time TNA Knockouts Tag Team Champion, and Feast or Fired (2015 – Pink Slip)		
