= Don West (wrestling) =

American sportscaster (1963–2022)

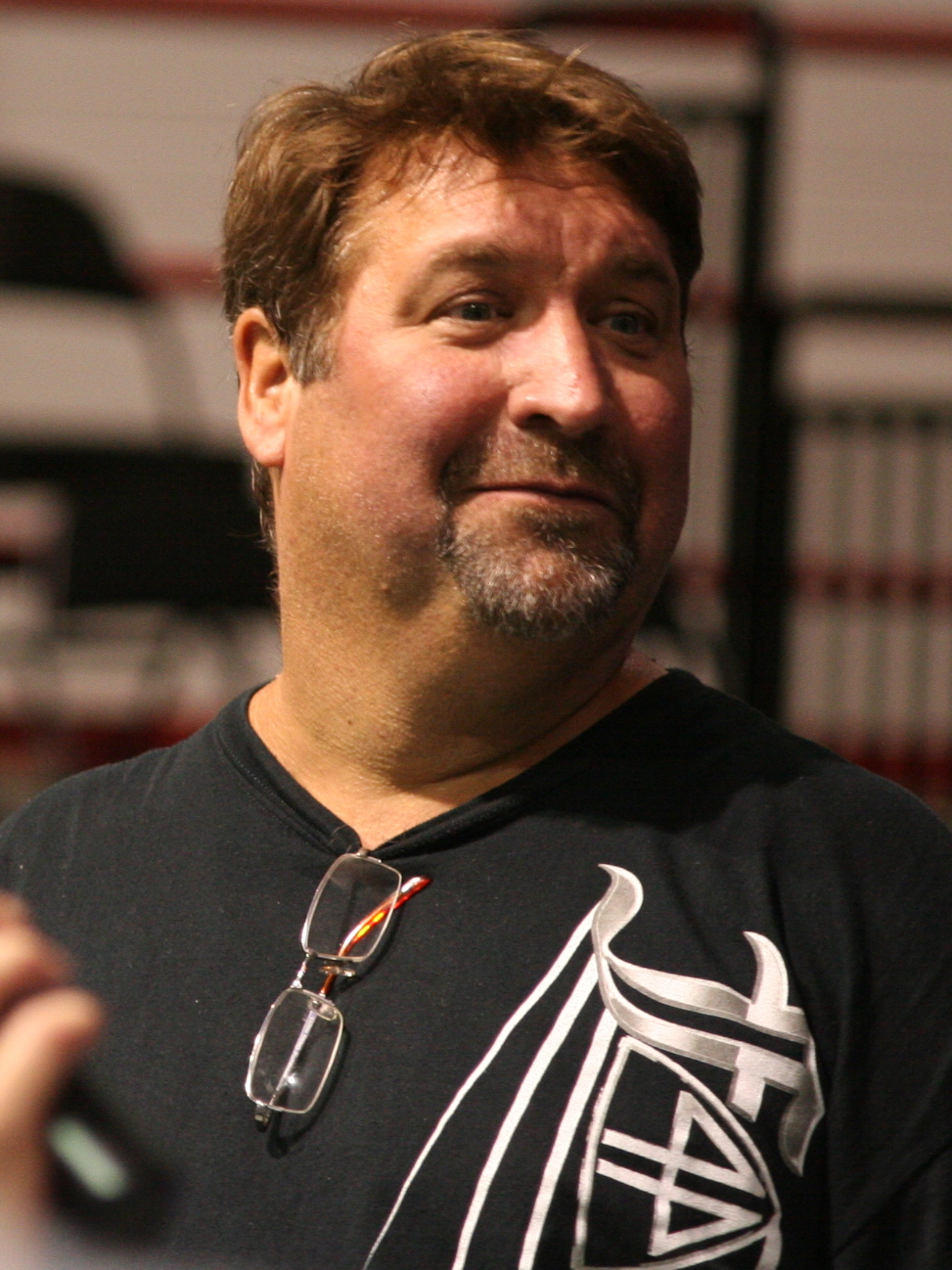
- West in 2010
- Born: Donald West; June 20, 1963; Chicago, Illinois, U.S.
- Died: December 30, 2022 (aged 59); Cashmere, Washington, U.S.
- Other name: D-Dub
- Education: Purdue University
- Occupations: Pitchman; television personality; professional wrestling broadcaster; sales director
- Years active: 2002–2017 (wrestling)
- Height: 5 ft 9 in (175 cm)
- Spouse: Terri West (m. 1992)

Donald West (June 20, 1963 – December 30, 2022) was an American pitchman, television personality, and professional wrestling broadcaster.

West first came to prominence as a host for the Shop at Home Network in the early 1990s, achieving a degree of fame for his loud, energetic, abrasive sales pitches on late night television and for his blunt tone and persuasive style. After briefly hosting a talk show, The Sports Reporters, on WNSR, West joined the professional wrestling promotion Total Nonstop Action Wrestling (TNA) as a color commentator in 2002; he would work with the promotion in various capacities over the 2000s and 2010s. In 2023, West was posthumously inducted into the TNA/Impact Hall of Fame.

== Early life ==
West was born in Chicago, Illinois, on June 20, 1963. He attended Purdue University, where he majored in sports broadcasting.

== Career ==
=== Shop at Home Network ===
Don West initially became involved with television shopping when he applied for a job with the Shop at Home Network as the host of a sports memorabilia show, Sports Collectibles. Despite his degree in sports broadcasting (and the fact that his brother Dale was the chief financial officer of the Shop at Home Network), West was rejected on the basis of his "scrabbly voice". In 1991, West began selling knives on television, and in March 1993, was made host of the Sports Memorabilia Show. Between 1993 and 2001, sales rose from $3 million to $150 million. In addition to sports memorabilia, West also pitched products such as Beanie Babies and Pokémon collectibles. Both Will Ferrell and Chris Kattan parodied West and his co-host, Eddy Lewis, on three episodes of Saturday Night Live.

=== The Sports Reporters ===
In 2001, West amicably left the Shop at Home Network and began hosting a sports talk show called The Sports Reporters on WNSR in Nashville, Tennessee. The program covered sports topics of the day and ongoing local sports issues. West was contacted by Vince Russo, then booker for World Championship Wrestling, who invited him to join the company. West declined the offer, the company being bought out a year later.

=== NWA Total Nonstop Action ===
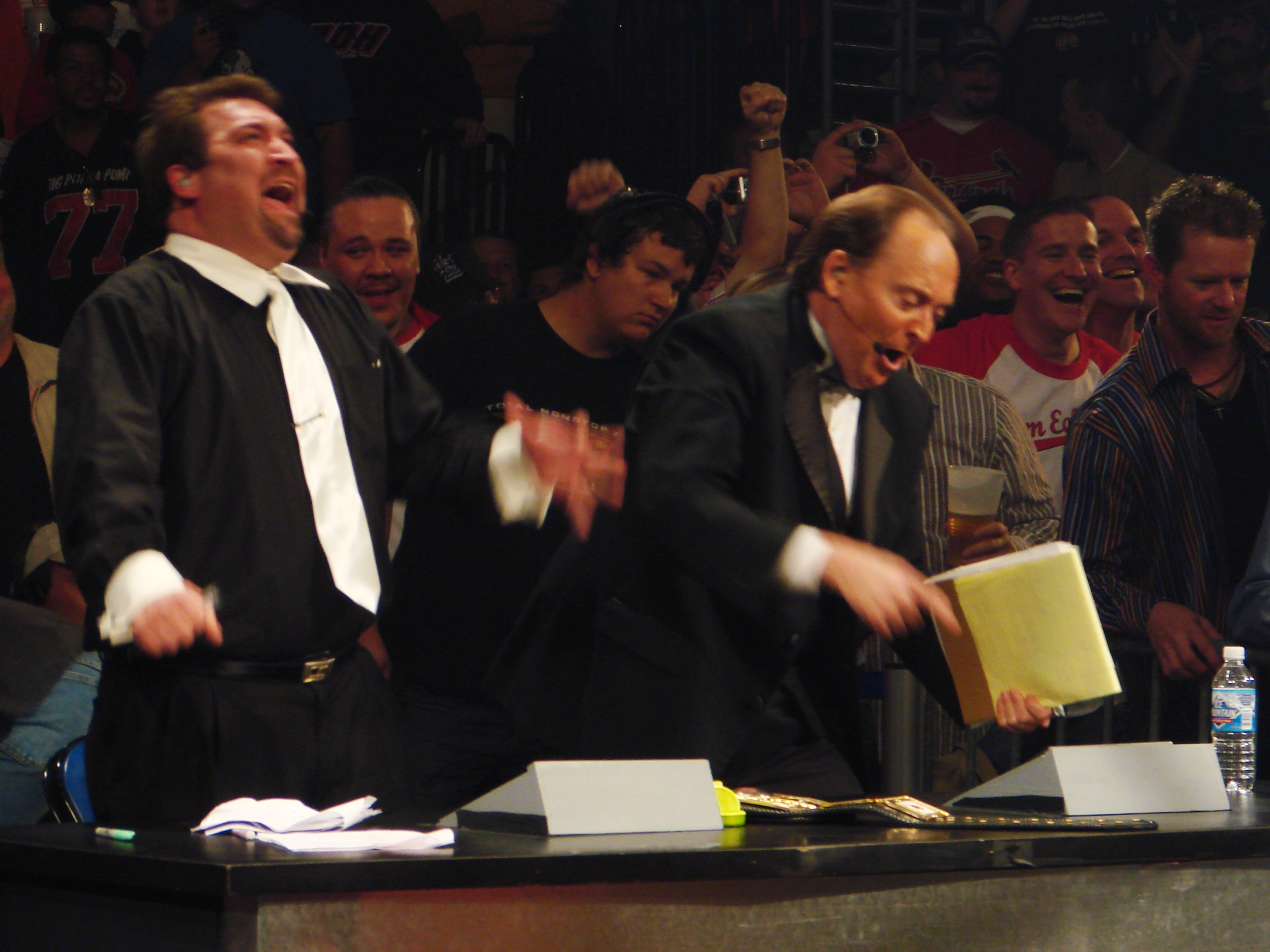
West (left) and Mike Tenay (right) commentating at Lockdown in April 2007.

In 2002, West was hired by Jeff Jarrett, who had been introduced to West by Russo, to serve as the color commentator for his newly formed professional wrestling promotion, Total Nonstop Action Wrestling. West made his commentary debut on June 19, 2002, on the inaugural TNA pay-per-view alongside Ed Ferrara and Mike Tenay. Ferrara departed TNA in August 2002, reducing the commentary team to Tenay and West. Aside from commentating, West accompanied Jeremy Borash on the YouTube-based show TNA Today, where he promoted new TNA merchandise and special packages called "Don West's Insane Daily Deals".

In 2007, West was appointed TNA's Director of Merchandise. In 2008, he was appointed TNA's Director of Merchandise for Live Events.

On the February 26, 2009, episode of Impact!, West turned heel when he verbally assaulted and walked out on his commentary partner Tenay, leaving him to call the remainder of the show alone. On the August 17, 2009, tapings of Impact! TNA removed West as a color commentator and replaced him with Taz. The company later announced that West had been promoted within the organization to oversee merchandise development and sales initiatives. On the October 15 edition of Impact! West returned as Amazing Red's new manager, turning face in the process.

On May 28, 2012, it was reported that West had given his notice and would be leaving TNA shortly.

=== Wenatchee Wild ===
In 2012, West left TNA to become the new director of sales and marketing of the Wenatchee, Washington–based Wenatchee Wild ice hockey team.

=== Impact Wrestling ===
On January 13, 2017, TNA (now known as Impact Wrestling) revealed that West had joined the merchandise department. On July 2, 2017, West returned to commentary for the final time at the Slammiversary XV pay-per-view. In 2022, Impact Wrestling featured a video tribute to their original announce team of West and Mike Tenay during Slammiversary.

On September 8, 2023, during Impact's Victory Road event, it was announced that West (alongside Mike Tenay) would be posthumously inducted into the Impact Hall of Fame in honor of them being the promotion's original broadcast team.

== Personal life and death ==
West married his wife Terri on July 18, 1992.

On June 16, 2021, West announced that he had been diagnosed with a lymphoma of the brain, and began treatment. On December 30, 2022, Mike Tenay confirmed that West had died from lymphoma at the age of 59. Memorial tributes to West were made by the pro-wrestling community through social media and on WWE, AEW, and Impact Wrestling programming.

== Awards and accomplishments ==
- Total Nonstop Action Wrestling
  - TNA Hall of Fame (2023 - alongside Mike Tenay)
- Wrestling Observer Newsletter
  - Worst Television Announcer (2007)
