= TNA Global Impact! =

- TNA Global Impact! logo
- Genre: Sports entertainment Professional wrestling
- Created by: Vince Russo; Jeff Jarrett
- Starring: See Total Nonstop Action Wrestling roster
- Country of origin: United States
- No. of episodes: 13

Production
- Camera setup: Multiple-camera setup
- Running time: Approximately 22 minutes per episode

Original release
- Network: Webcast
- Release: May 3 – August 19, 2006

Related
- TNA Xplosion (2002–2021, 2024–present); TNA Impact! (2004–present); TNA Gut Check (2004–present); TNA British Boot Camp (2013–2014); Before the Impact (2021–2023)

TNA Global Impact! is an online professional wrestling show produced by Total Nonstop Action Wrestling (TNA) that existed in 2006. Global Impact!, which was hosted by TNA interviewers Jeremy Borash and Christy Hemme, featured "exclusive footage, interviews, news updates, matches and more".

== History ==
=== Original segments ===
Global Impact! originated in TNA in 2005. Segments displayed the worldwide "Impact!" of TNA, with an unseen Jeremy Borash providing a voice-over. These segments included TNA performers appearing in promotions and tours of different countries, and various happenings in TNA.

=== Online show ===
On April 24, 2006, TNA announced that it would be converting Global Impact! into a weekly webcast show as of May 3, 2006 as part of an agreement between TNA and YouTube. Jeremy Borash was announced as the onscreen host, with Christy Hemme to co-host the inaugural broadcast. TNA website manager Bill Banks (who helped launch similar online shows such as WWE Byte This! and WCW Reload), was expected to have a large behind-the-scenes role.

This agreement would be short-lived after high viewership caused the YouTube server to crash, future episodes were hosted on TNA's official website.

On August 19, 2006, the show was put on hold with no real reason given. Instead, TNA switched to providing information in the form of an audio podcast.

=== Television revival ===
On December 14, 2007, Spike TV issued a press release which indicated that TNA would hold a one-hour special in January of the following year entitled "Global Impact!". The show would feature taped matches involving TNA wrestlers competing at the Wrestle Kingdom II New Japan Pro-Wrestling Tokyo Dome show on January 4, including Kurt Angle facing Yuji Nagata for the IGF's version of the IWGP Heavyweight Championship.

The show aired on Thursday, January 17, 2008 at 11:00pm EST following the weekly episode of TNA Impact!. According to TNA's recent contract renewal with Spike TV, it is expected that this will be the first of several occasional special-airing shows.

=== DVD release ===
On February 28, 2008, TNA released the first Global Impact! special from Japan on DVD. Unlike the on-air broadcast, it contains the 7 full-length-matches that TNA stars participated in during the January 4 Tokyo Dome Event. It also contained backstage interviews from before and after the event. A full DVD Review can be read at the following link:

=== Global Impact 2: Japan ===
On December 14, 2008, TNA Wrestling.com officially announced Global Impact 2: Japan. The show aired on Spike TV on October 8, 2009. It featured taped matches involving TNA wrestlers competing at the Wrestle Kingdom III New Japan Pro-Wrestling Tokyo Dome show on January 4. The Motor City Machine Guns (Alex Shelley and Chris Sabin) defeating No Limit (Tetsuya Naito and Yujiro) for the IWGP Junior Heavyweight Tag Team Championship, Kurt Angle, Kevin Nash, Masahiro Chono, and Riki Choshu defeating Giant Bernard, Takashi Iizuka, Tomohiro Ishii, and Karl Anderson, and Team 3D (Brother Devon and Brother Ray) defeating The Most Violent Players (Togi Makabe and Toru Yano) in a Hardcore match for the IWGP Tag Team Championship.

=== Global Impact 3 ===
Global Impact 3 logo.

Global Impact 3 debuted on pay-per-view on February 24, 2011, and featured matches involving TNA wrestlers from the January 4, 2011, New Japan Pro-Wrestling show Wrestle Kingdom V in Tokyo Dome which aired live on pay-per-view in Japan. The matches included saw Beer Money, Inc. (James Storm and Robert Roode) unsuccessfully challenging Bad Intentions (Giant Bernard and Karl Anderson) for the IWGP Tag Team Championship in a three–way tag team match, which also included Muscle Orchestra (Manabu Nakanishi and Strong Man), Rob Van Dam defeating Toru Yano in a hardcore match and Jeff Hardy successfully defending the TNA World Heavyweight Championship against Tetsuya Naito.
