= TNA World Tag Team Championship =

Men's professional wrestling championship

- The current TNA World Tag Team Championship belt

Details
- Promotion: Total Nonstop Action Wrestling
- Date established: May 17, 2007
- Current champions: The Nemeths (Nic Nemeth and Ryan Nemeth)
- Date won: August 23, 2026

Other names
- TNA World Tag Team Championship (2007–2017, 2024–present); Impact Wrestling World Tag Team Championship (2017); Unified GFW World Tag Team Championship (2017); GFW World Tag Team Championship (2017); Impact World Tag Team Championship (2017–2024)
Statistics
- First champions: Team 3D (Brother Devon and Brother Ray)
- Most reigns: As tag team (5 reigns): Beer Money, Inc. (Bobby Roode and James Storm); The Wolves (Davey Richards and Eddie Edwards); Hardys/Broken Hardys (Matt Hardy/Broken Matt and Jeff Hardy/Brother Nero); As individual (7 reigns): James Storm; Eddie Edwards
- Longest reign: The North (Ethan Page and Josh Alexander) (1st reign, 380 days)
- Shortest reign: Kaz and Eric Young/Super Eric (<1 day)
- Oldest champion: Scott Steiner (55 years, 267 days)
- Youngest champion: Trevor Lee (21 years, 301 days)
- Heaviest champion: Violent By Design (Eric Young, Rhino, Joe Doering, and Deaner) (1,015 lb (460 kg))
- Lightest champion: Kurt Angle (220 lb (100 kg))

The TNA World Tag Team Championship is a men's professional wrestling world tag team championship which is owned by the Total Nonstop Action Wrestling (TNA) promotion. The current champions are The Nemeths (Nic Nemeth and Ryan Nemeth), who are in their second reign as a team and individually. They won the title by defeating The Hardys (Matt Hardy and Jeff Hardy) in a Steel Cage tornado tag team match at Lockdown on August 23, 2026, in Chicago, Illinois.

Prior to the creation of this championship, TNA controlled the NWA World Tag Team Championship via an agreement with the National Wrestling Alliance (NWA). In 2007, the agreement between TNA and the NWA was terminated, leading to the creation of the TNA World Tag Team Championship which then debuted on May 14, 2007, at the taping of TNA's primary television program, TNA Impact!. It was officially introduced worldwide on the May 17, 2007, edition of TNA's online podcast TNA Today. Like most professional wrestling championships, the title is won as a result of a pre-determined match.

== History ==
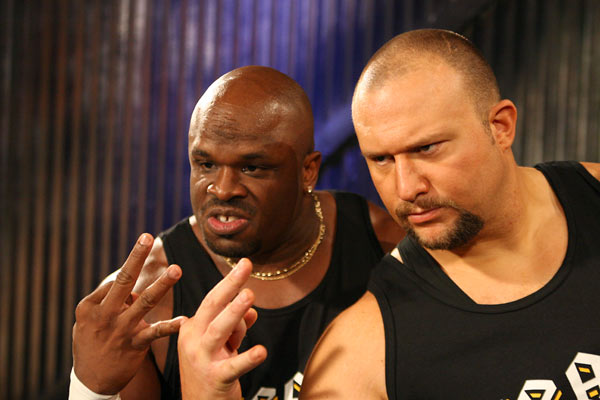
Inaugural and two-time champions Team 3D (Brother Devon and Brother Ray)

The Total Nonstop Action Wrestling promotion formed in May 2002. Later that same year, TNA were granted control over the NWA World Heavyweight and World Tag Team Championships by the National Wrestling Alliance (NWA) governing body, subsequently becoming an official NWA territory as NWA–TNA. On June 19, 2002, NWA–TNA held its first show: a weekly pay-per-view (PPV) event. The main event of the telecast was a twenty–man Gauntlet for the Gold match—involving all twenty men trying to throw each other over the top rope and down to the floor in order to eliminate them, until there are two men left who wrestle a standard match—to become the first ever TNA–era NWA World Heavyweight Champion. Ken Shamrock defeated Malice to win the vacant championship with Ricky Steamboat as Special Guest Referee at the event. TNA crowned the first TNA–era NWA World Tag Team Champions at their third weekly PPV event on July 3, 2002, when the team of A.J. Styles and Jerry Lynn defeated The Rainbow Express (Bruce and Lenny Lane) in a tournament final to win the championship.

=== Creation ===
The NWA World Heavyweight and World Tag Team Championships were contested for in TNA until the morning of May 13, 2007. On that day, NWA's Executive Director Robert Trobich announced that the NWA were ending their five–year agreement with TNA, which had allowed them full control over both titles. Trobich went on to state that effective that morning, then-NWA World Heavyweight Champion Christian Cage and the Team 3D pairing of Brother Devon and Brother Ray, then-NWA World Tag Team Champions, were stripped of their respective championships. The motivation behind these actions was that Cage refused to defend the NWA World Heavyweight Championship against wrestlers from NWA territories. That same day, TNA were scheduled to produce their Sacrifice 2007 PPV event, in which both Cage and Team 3D were to defend their respective championships. On the card, Cage was scheduled to defend the NWA World Heavyweight Championship against Kurt Angle and Sting in a three-way match. Team 3D were set to defend the NWA World Tag Team Championship against the team of Scott Steiner and Tomko and the team made up of Hernandez and Homicide, who were known as The Latin American Xchange (LAX), in another three-way match.

That night before each contest, the on-screen graphic used to refer to the champions and their respective championships, credited both Cage and Team 3D as still being NWA Champions. Team 3D defeated Steiner and Tomko and LAX in the three-way tag team match to retain the "World Tag Team Championship", while Angle defeated Cage and Sting to win the "World Heavyweight Championship".

On May 17, 2007, Jeremy Borash and TNA's primary authority figure at the time, Jim Cornette, unveiled the TNA World Tag Team Championship belt on that day's edition of TNA's online podcast TNA Today and awarded it to Team 3D as a result of them being the NWA Tag Team Champions before the NWA/TNA split; in the process making them the first official champions.

== Championship Tournaments ==
=== TNA World Tag Team Championship Tournament (2015) ===
Between March 14 and March 16, 2015 episodes of Impact Wrestling a tournament was held to crown new TNA World Tag Team Champions.

No.	Results	Stipulations	Times
1	The Hardys (Jeff Hardy and Matt Hardy) defeated The Revolution (James Storm and Khoya)	TNA World Tag Team Championship Tournament Semifinal match	5:40
2	The Beatdown Clan (Kenny King and Low Ki) defeated Mr. Anderson and Rockstar Spud	TNA World Tag Team Championship Tournament Semifinal match	6:50
3	Bram and Ethan Carter III defeated Jay Rios and Tigre Uno	TNA World Tag Team Championship Tournament Semifinal match	3:50
4	Austin Aries and Bobby Roode defeated The BroMans (Jessie Godderz and Robbie E)	TNA World Tag Team Championship Tournament Semifinal match	5:20
5	The Hardys (Jeff Hardy and Matt Hardy) defeated Austin Aries and Bobby Roode, Bram and Ethan Carter III and The Beatdown Clan (Kenny King and Low Ki)	Ultimate X match for the vacant TNA World Tag Team Championship	12:06

=== Impact World Tag Team Championship #1 Contendership Tournament (2023) ===
On August 2, 2023 a new four man tag team tournament was announced where the winners will face Subculture (Mark Andrews and Flash Morgan Webster) (with their female valet Dani Luna in their corner) for the Impact World Tag Team Championships at Impact Pay-per-view Emergence of year 2023.

== Championship belt designs ==
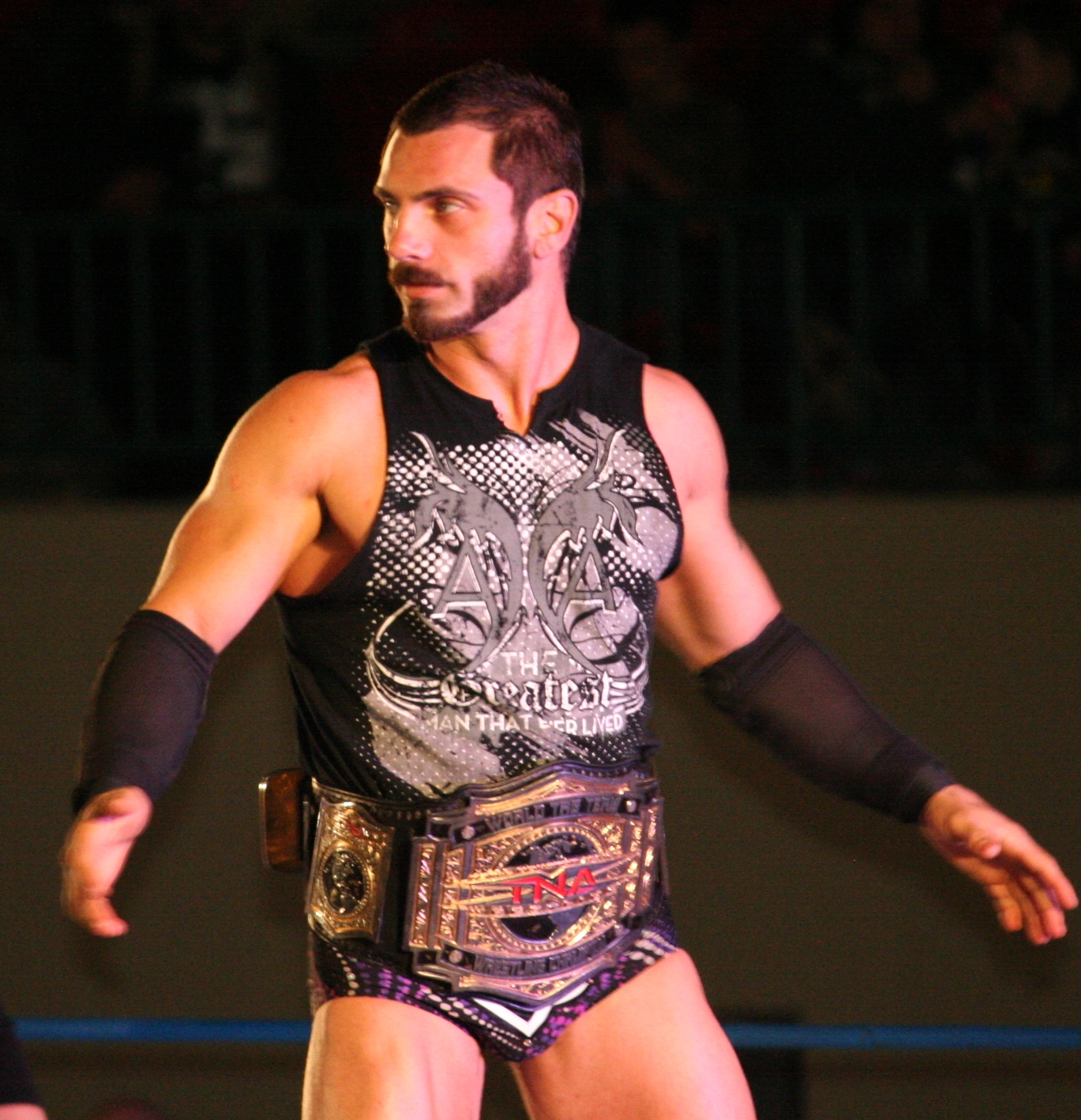
The original 2007 design of the TNA World Tag Team Championship belts, with Austin Aries.

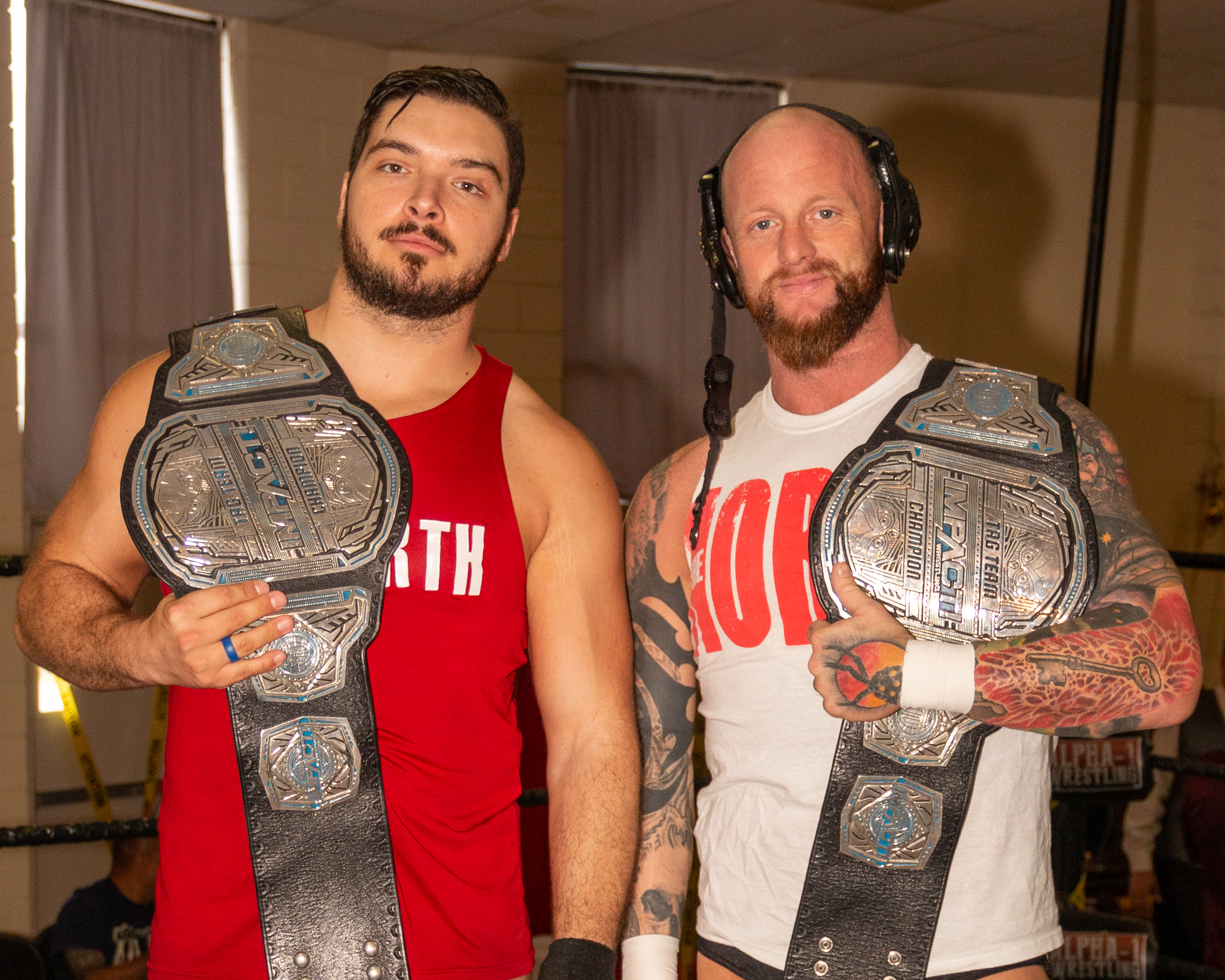
The 2019 design of the Impact World Tag Team Championships with Ethan Page & Josh Alexander.

The 2020 design of the title.

The 2024 design of the TNA World Tag Team Championship belts.

During the championship's entire history, it has had four designs. Until Destination X (2017), it had a leather strap covered with four small gold plates that has an imprint of the earth centered in the middle with TNA's official logo at the top of each. The center golden plate of the belt also has an imprint of a globe, with TNA's official logo engraved over it. The words "World Tag Team" are placed above the globe, while the words "Wrestling Champion" are placed below it.

At Destination X 2017, a recolored version of the GFW Tag Team Championships from the original promotion was revealed as the new tag team championships. The main plate had the Global Force Wrestling logo to the left and the words "Tag Team Champions" centered on the bottom of the belt. The top of the main plate had a globe, with a bird below it. The side plates had the words "Tag Team" on the top and "Champions" on the bottom, with the GFW Impact! logo on the left side plate and the GFW logo on the right side plate. After Jeff Jarrett left the company and took the GFW name with him, all championships have been updated with an Impact Wrestling logo to cover the GFW logo.

At Redemption on April 22, 2018, Impact revealed new championships. The main plate is oblong, similar to the WCW World Six-Man Tag Team Championship. It has the Impact logo at a diagonal angle centered between the words "Tag Team" on the top and "Champion" on the bottom. It features two designs of an owl above and below the words.

At Hard to Kill on January 13, 2024, new championships were used for the first time as part of Impact Wrestling's rebrand to return to being TNA Wrestling. The new belts had actually been presented to the reigning champs, the ABC (Ace Austin and Chris Bey) on social media in the days leading up to the PPV.

== Reigns ==
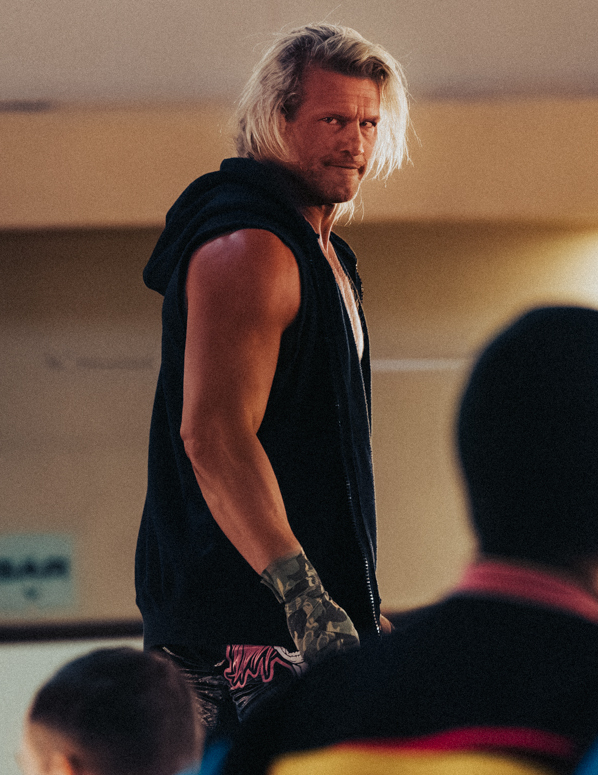
Current and two-time champions The Nemeths (Nic Nemeth and Ryan Nemeth (not pictured))

The inaugural champions were Team 3D (Brother Devon and Brother Ray), who were awarded the championship on the May 17, 2007 edition of TNA Today. At 380 days, The North's (Ethan Page and Josh Alexander) reign is the longest in the title's history. Eric Young/Super Eric and Kaz's only reign holds the record for shortest reign in the title's history at a half day. Individually, James Storm holds the record with seven reigns, while Beer Money and The Wolves (Davey Richards and Eddie Edwards) share the record of five reigns as a team.

Although the title is a World Tag Team Championship, three wrestlers have held the championship by themselves — Samoa Joe, Kurt Angle, and Matt Morgan. Joe held the championship during his entire reign alone; however, Angle held the championship alone for 15 days until Sting won a match involving three other competitors to become Angle's partner, and Morgan held the title after turning on and (kayfabe) injuring his tag team championship partner Hernandez. Overall, there have been 76 reigns shared between 74 wrestlers and 49 teams.

The Nemeths (Nic Nemeth and Ryan Nemeth) are the current champions in their second reign both as a team and individually. They won the title by defeating The Hardys (Matt Hardy and Jeff Hardy) in a Steel Cage tornado tag team match at Lockdown on August 23, 2026, in Chicago, Illinois.

== See also ==
- NWA World Tag Team Championship
- List of NWA World Tag Team Champions
- History of Total Nonstop Action Wrestling
