= TNA Impact! =

Professional wrestling television program

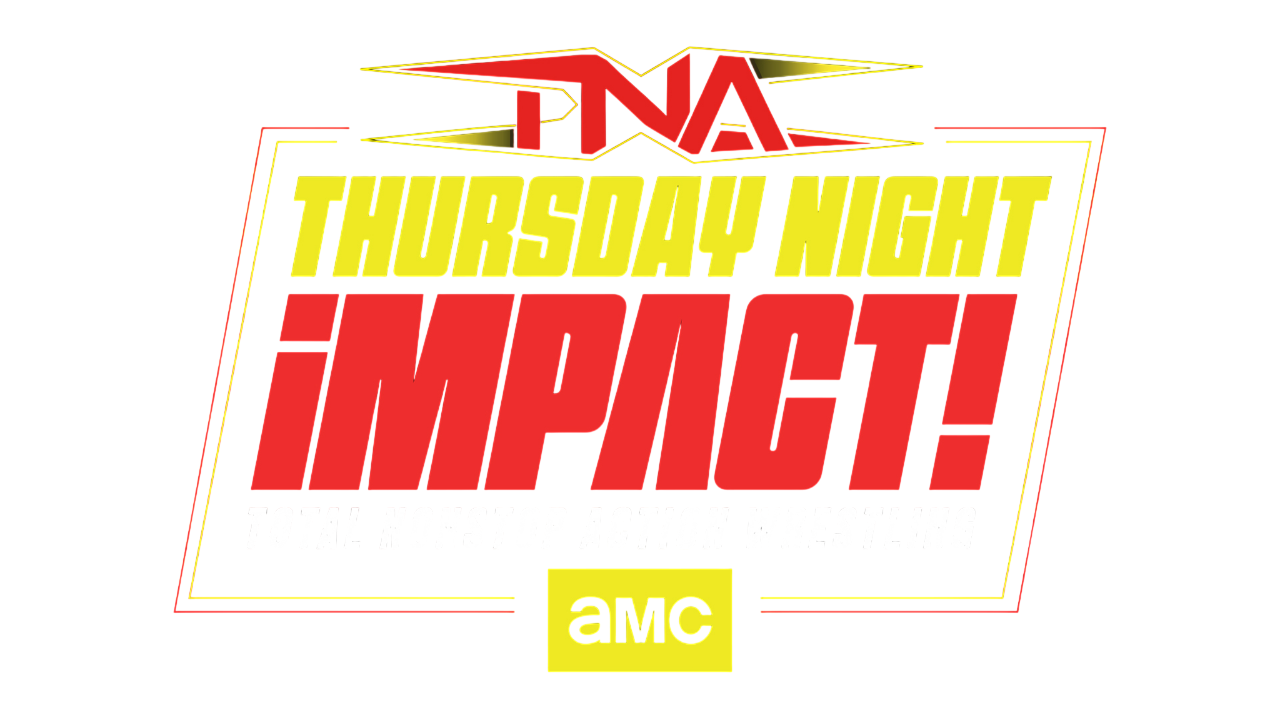
- The TNA Thursday Night Impact! logo as of 2026.
- Also known as: TNA Impact! (2004–2011, 2024–present); TNA Thursday Night Impact! (2026—present); Impact Wrestling (2011–2017); GFW Impact! (2017); Impact! (2017–2024)
- Genre: Professional wrestling
- Created by: Jeff Jarrett
- Presented by: Tom Hannifan (play-by-play commentator); Matthew Rehwoldt (color commentator)
- Starring: TNA roster
- Country of origin: United States
- Original language: English
- No. of seasons: 22
- No. of episodes: 1141

Production
- Production locations: Impact Zone (2004-2018) (Universal Studios Florida), Orlando, Florida; Various arenas and sports venues (2018–present)
- Camera setup: Multi-camera setup
- Running time: 120 minutes (inc. commercials)
- Production company: Anthem Wrestling Exhibitions, LLC

Original release
- Network: Fox Sports Net
- Release: June 4, 2004 – May 27, 2005
- Network: Urban America Television; TNAWrestling.com; Sun Sports
- Release: June 24 – September 16, 2005
- Network: Spike TV
- Release: October 1, 2005 – December 24, 2014
- Network: Destination America
- Release: January 7 – December 16, 2015
- Network: Pop
- Release: January 5, 2016 – January 4, 2019
- Network: Pursuit Channel; Fight Network (Note: from October 5, 2017 to July 26, 2018. Still airs reruns to the present day.); Twitch (Note: until July 20, 2021)
- Release: January 11 – October 18, 2019
- Network: AXS TV; TNA+ (Note: from January 5, 2024); New England Sports Network (Note: from January 4, 2025)
- Release: October 29, 2019 – January 8, 2026
- Network: AMC; AMC+ TNA+
- Release: January 15, 2026 – present

Related
- TNA Xplosion (2002–2021, 2024–present); Before the Impact (2021–2023)

TNA Impact!, also known as TNA Thursday Night Impact! or simply Impact! (stylized as iMPACT!), is an American professional wrestling television program produced by the American promotion Total Nonstop Action Wrestling (TNA) that debuted on June 4, 2004. It also features wrestlers from WWE's NXT brand due to the working relationship between the two companies.

The series currently airs every Thursday at 9 p.m. Eastern Time (ET) on AMC as well as streaming on AMC+ in the United States and TNA+ internationally, owned by its parent company Anthem Sports & Entertainment. It premiered on AMC on January 15, 2026.

== History ==
=== Fox Sports Net and Webcasts (2004–2005) ===
On May 5, 2004, TNA sealed a television deal with Fox Sports Net (FSN) where they would get a one-hour timeslot on Fridays in most markets, putting TNA on unrestricted cable and satellite for the first time. TNA began taping a new weekly series that month, TNA Impact!, with the first episode premiering on June 4, 2004.

After 51 shows TNA's contract with FSN expired in May 2005 and was not renegotiated, with the last FSN episode of Impact! airing on May 27, 2005. Impact! continued to air on certain regional networks in place of Xplosion. On July 1, TNA began offering new episodes through their website, first using BitTorrent downloads, then by streaming through RealPlayer. To save on production costs, four hours of the show were recorded in a day and made available throughout the subsequent month.

=== Spike TV (2005–2014) ===
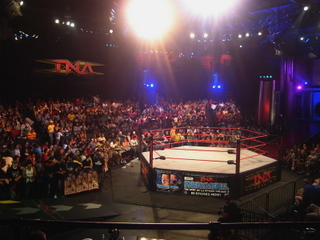
The Impact Zone in 2007

Seeking a more profitable television outlet, TNA negotiated a Saturday night timeslot with Spike TV (now known as the Paramount Network), which had recently lost WWE Raw back to USA Network. Spike TV started airing Impact! on October 1, 2005, five days after the departure of Raw. Two episodes were taped every other Tuesday, airing them on the subsequent Saturdays. TNA's syndication contracts for the show on local television channels, from after the FSN contract, were converted to contracts for their syndicated show, TNA Xplosion. They were no longer paying for the timeslot, though Spike controlled their advertising revenue. Because of viewership growth, Impact! was moved to Thursdays in April 2006, and later to an earlier primetime slot in November. At this time tapings were moved from Tuesdays to Mondays. In June 2006, episodes became available at the iTunes Store, though they have since been removed.

==== Expansion to two hours (2007–2010) ====
Due to further viewership growth, Impact! was expanded to two hours on October 4, 2007, still starting at the same time of 9:00 p.m. On January 17, 2008, Spike presented an event entitled "Global Impact!", which featured TNA wrestlers in matches against talents from New Japan Pro-Wrestling and on March 27, 2008, Impact! aired live for the first time in the show's history in its regular timeslot. By April 2, 2008, TNA had come to terms on a deal that had the show airing in Australia starting April 5. Up until then, they had only broadcast their monthly pay-per-view events on Main Event in Australia. The contract expired in March 2011 and was not renewed, however, in May 2011, the show was picked up by Australian Network FuelTV, which began airing it every Saturday at 8:30 p.m. AEST, starting on June 11. On October 23, 2008, TNA aired its first Impact! filmed outside the Impact Zone in Orlando, Florida. It was broadcast from The Joint in the Hard Rock Hotel and Casino in Las Vegas, Nevada. TNA also made the transition to HD for this and all future broadcasts.

==== Move to Mondays (2010) ====
On January 4, 2010, the show went head-to-head for the first time with TNA's rival-promotion WWE's flagship show Raw. This would be the first time since March 2001 that two major wrestling promotions went head-to-head in a Monday night television ratings competition. TNA advertised the debut of Hulk Hogan and his return to professional wrestling, while WWE promoted the return of Bret Hart to Raw, who last made an appearance in November 1997 before the Montreal Screwjob. On this night, Impact! was watched by around 4 million viewers for the opening hour, but towards the end of the show, the viewership declined to 2.2 million viewers. This was the highest viewership in the show's history. Raw was watched by 5.6 million viewers, the most since August 2009.

Impact! was permanently moved to Monday nights on March 8, 2010. The show would air live on a bi-weekly basis and be taped for the following week. Beginning with the April 12, 2010, episode, Impact! was aired at 8:00 p.m. Eastern on Spike TV. This change was made as a result of an increase in ratings from the March 29, 2010, show (which aired at 9:00 p.m. Eastern) to the April 5, 2010, episode, which aired at 8:00 p.m. Eastern. During this period, replays of the show continued to air on Thursday nights. After two months, the show returned to Thursdays permanently as the ratings for the Monday showings were declining. The final Monday Impact! scored a 0.8 rating.

==== Return to Thursday Nights (2010–2011) ====
The show returned to Thursday nights on Thursday, May 13, 2010. Commenting on the move on the TNA website, Brian J. Diamond (Spike's Senior Vice President of Sports and Specials) said, "The fans have spoken and with their input, we have determined the best time slot to maximize the TNA audience is on Thursday nights where we are confident it will be among the most-watched shows with young men." TNA president Dixie Carter called this move "a win/win opportunity for both TNA and the fans".

On June 24, 2010, Spike expanded "TNA Thursdays" to three hours with the addition of TNA Reaction (stylized as TNA ReAction or, alternatively, as TNA ReACTION), which became a regular one-hour docu-series immediately preceding TNA iMPACT! from 8:00 p.m.–9:00 p.m. Eastern. ReAction focused on the stories and characters of TNA Wrestling and previewed the upcoming episode of TNA iMPACT! On February 24, 2011, TNA held Impact! tapings at the Crown Coliseum in Fayetteville, North Carolina.

==== Re-branding to Impact Wrestling (2011–2014) ====
Second Impact logo used from 2011 to 2015

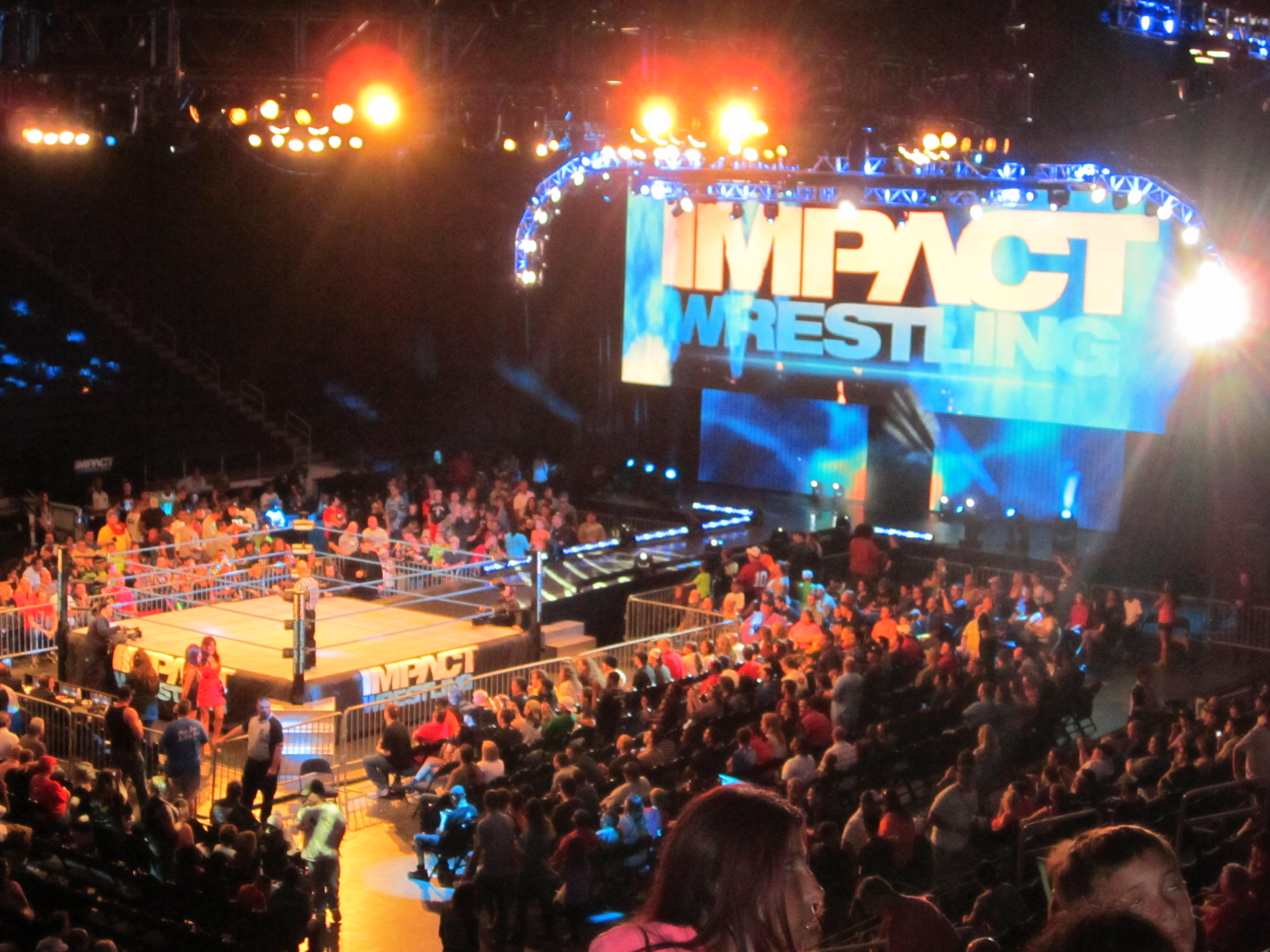
Impact Wrestling taping in Duluth, Georgia

On May 3, 2011, during the tapings of the May 12 episode of TNA Impact, the show would change its name to Impact Wrestling and adopt the slogan "Where Wrestling Matters". The show's color scheme would change from red and black to blue, white and gray, while the URL of TNA's website was also changed to impactwrestling.com. TNA held Impact Wrestling tapings on August 25, 2011 at the Von Braun Center in Huntsville, Alabama, on September 21 at the Knoxville Coliseum in Knoxville, Tennessee, and on October 26 at the Macon Coliseum in Macon, Georgia. The first international Impact Wrestling tapings took place on January 28, 2012 at the Wembley Arena in London, England.

Through the summer of 2012, starting on May 31, Impact Wrestling aired live at a new time slot at 8:00 p.m. ET. The live schedule was later extended first through September, and then through the rest of 2012. On March 14, 2013, TNA began taping Impact from different venues around the United States, such as the Sears Center in Chicago, the Sands Casino Event Center in Bethlehem, Pennsylvania, and the Manhattan Center's Grand Ballroom in New York City. TNA officially terminated its lease with Universal Studios in Orlando, Florida in late March 2013 and left the Impact Zone.

On March 14, 2013, TNA introduced a new universal HD set which is used for all weekly programming. On May 30, 2013, Impact Wrestling went back to its old start time of 9:00 p.m. In 2013, TNA broadcast five Impact Wrestling specials, starting on July 18, 2013 with Destination X. This was followed by Hardcore Justice, No Surrender, Final Resolution and Turning Point. These specials replaced the PPV events of the same name following TNA changing their monthly PPV format to a quarterly model.

On November 21, 2013 TNA returned to Universal Studios in Orlando, Florida due to the high cost of production on the road after being unable to cover the rising costs of taping on the road. Impact tapings were filmed from soundstage 19, rather than at the original Impact Zone at soundstage 21, but select shows were still taped on the road from time to time, such as the Genesis Impact Wrestling special on January 16 and 23, 2014 from Huntsville, Alabama. TNA also launched a new programming initiative called "IMPACT365" to advertise upcoming shows and start new angles and storylines.

On January 30, 2014, for the first time, Impact Wrestling was broadcast live in the United Kingdom on Challenge before it aired in the United States. The show took place at The Hydro in Glasgow, Scotland. Starting with the March 13, 2014 live broadcast of Impact Wrestling, TNA changed to soundstage 20 at Universal Studios. Soundstage 19 and 20 were only temporary venues for Impact Wrestling tapings. Since June 10, 2014 TNA taped Impact Wrestling from The Sands Casino Event Center in Bethlehem, Pennsylvania and the Manhattan Center's Grand Ballroom in New York City. On July 17, 2014, after a poll made on the Impact Wrestling website, TNA brought back the six-sided ring permanently.

==== Final months on Spike (July–December 2014) ====
On July 28, 2014, TMZ reported that Spike would not renew TNA's contract, which was due to expire in September. The decision was reportedly triggered by TNA's decision to bring writer Vince Russo back to the company as a consultant. However, Mike Johnson of PW Insider who first revealed that Russo was working for TNA insists that his involvement had nothing to do with the cancellation. TNA president Dixie Carter and Spike subsequently released independent statements claiming that negotiations were ongoing. In August, amid ongoing negotiations with Spike, Impact Wrestling moved to Wednesday nights. Spike spokesperson David Schwarz told The Christian Post that increasing competition from other sports programs prompted the move from Thursday nights. The show ceased airing new televised events after the edition of November 19 of Impact Wrestling, with the final episodes of 2014 being dedicated to Best of TNA clip shows, before resuming events on January 7, 2015 with a live show from The Manhattan Center's Grand Ballroom in New York City. The last episode of Impact Wrestling broadcast on Spike aired on December 24, 2014.

=== Post-Spike TV (2015–2017) ===
Fourth Impact logo used from 2015 to 2017

On November 19, 2014, TNA reached a deal with Discovery Communications to move its programming, including Impact Wrestling, to Destination America in January 2015. After premiering on Wednesday, January 7, Impact Wrestling moved to its permanent slot on Fridays on January 16.

Along with the move to Destination America, the show got a new logo, graphics package, theme music, and stage. Former WWE employee Josh Mathews was also added to the commentary team. A brand new weekly series hosted by Mike Tenay, Impact Wrestling: Unlocked, premiered on Saturday, January 17 and TNA Wrestling's Greatest Matches, a series featuring the best matches in the company's history, made its U.S. debut on Saturday, January 10. After switching timeslots numerous times, both shows were cancelled in May.

Also in May, Dave Meltzer of the Wrestling Observer Newsletter reported that Destination America had decided to cancel Impact Wrestling by late September 2015. TNA vehemently denied the report, stating: "These false statements constitute defamation and if necessary we will seek all legal remedies available to us." The following week, Destination America signed a 26-week trial deal with Ring of Honor (ROH) that would see Ring of Honor Wrestling air as Impact Wrestling's lead-in, which began on June 3. Impact Wrestling subsequently began airing on Wednesdays starting in June.

On June 3, D'Angelo Dinero officially joined Josh Mathews as a new addition to the commentary team for Impact Wrestling. In a September interview with Sports Illustrated, Dixie Carter indicated that Impact Wrestling would remain on Destination America for the rest of the year which ended on December 16, 2015.

Beginning January 5, 2016, Impact Wrestling aired Tuesday nights on Pop. With the show's move to Pop, Impact Wrestling received new theme music ("Roustabout" by The Smashing Pumpkins' Billy Corgan), a new stage, and a new opening intro for the first time in three years. Impact Wrestling moved back to Thursday nights beginning July 21, 2016, in order to avoid airing directly opposite WWE SmackDown, which moved to Tuesdays.

=== Early Anthem era (2017–2024) ===
Fifth Impact logo used in 2017

In 2017, TNA was acquired by Anthem Sports & Entertainment, the owner of Impact's Canadian broadcaster Fight Network; in March 2017, TNA subsequently changed its name to Impact Wrestling to match the show's title. On July 4, 2017, after the company briefly rebranded as Global Force Wrestling (GFW), the show's name was changed to GFW Impact! (or simply, Impact!). The GFW branding would be dropped in the October of that year, following the departure of Jeff Jarrett and the subsequent cancellation of the merger with Impact Wrestling.

After Bound for Glory 2017 in November 2017, Impact would do a set of tapings in Ottawa.

Following the 2018 Redemption pay-per-view, Impact Wrestling would return to touring, taping in various smaller venues. The year's taping locations included Windsor, Ontario, Toronto, Mexico City, New York City, and Las Vegas.

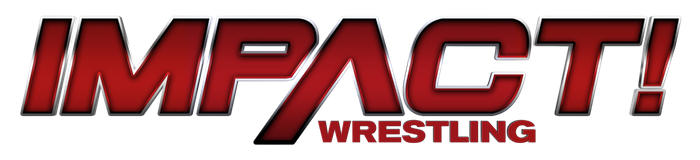
Sixth Impact logo used from 2019 to 2023

In 2019, Impact Wrestling held tapings in Philadelphia, Dallas, New York City, Houston, Windsor, Mexico City, Nashville, Toronto, Rahway, Fort Campbell, Owensboro, and other venues in Ontario.

On January 11, 2019, Impact!'s U.S broadcast moved to Pursuit Channel, a channel partly owned by Anthem but with a significantly smaller subscriber base than Pop; To compensate, Impact Wrestling expanded their previous agreement with Twitch to simulcast Impact! episode broadcasts online, beginning with the Pursuit Channel debut on January 11.

On September 9, 2019, Anthem purchased a majority stake in AXS TV. Impact! moved to AXS the following month, after Bound for Glory on October 20, 2019, and continued to simulcast on the company's Twitch channel. The show moved to Tuesday nights, beginning on October 29, 2019.

Due to the COVID-19 pandemic, all Impact! episode tapings were held behind closed doors at Skyway Studios in Nashville, Tennessee, beginning in April 2020 with the two-part Rebellion special, which was taped from April 8 to 10, and broadcast from April 21 to 28. Beginning with Hard to Kill on January 16, 2021, until Slammiversary on July 17, 2021, crowd noises were piped into Impact Wrestling programming.

In February 2021, Impact Wrestling launched a new one-hour preshow, Before the Impact (abbreviated as BTI), which premiered on February 16 on AXS TV in the U.S. BTI features news, recaps of previous episodes of Impact!, previews of the following episode, and an exclusive match. BTI would replace Xplosion, which was cancelled in March 2021. The two shows would crossover on the June 3 episodes, when Josh Alexander faced T. J. Perkins for the X Division Championship in Impact Wrestling's first-ever 60-minute Iron man match. The match began on BTI and concluded in the opening minutes of Impact!.

On April 8, 2021, Impact! moved back to Thursday nights.

On August 4, 2021, Impact Wrestling launched a new YouTube membership program called "Impact Wrestling Insiders", which would include day-and-date premieres of new Impact! episodes. Subsequently, the promotion ended its partnership with Twitch; the final Twitch broadcast of Impact! aired on July 29.

On October 23, 2021, Impact held their first event outside of Nashville in a year and a half with Bound for Glory, which took place just outside of Las Vegas in Sunrise Manor, Nevada, with Impact later resuming a full schedule of live touring in January 2022.

In March 2023, Impact held events in Windsor, Ontario, Canada. This marked their first shows outside of the U.S. in three years. Numerous other shows were held throughout Canada all through the year.

=== Return of TNA Impact! (2024–present) ===
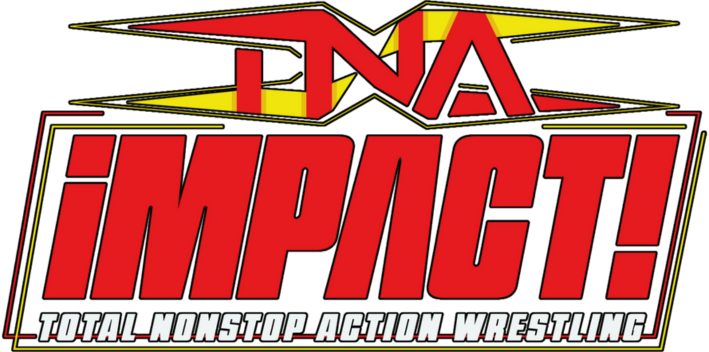
Seventh logo for Impact used from January 25, 2024 to January 8, 2026

In January 2024, Impact Wrestling reverted its name back to TNA, with its flagship weekly program likewise reverting back to TNA Impact!.

In mid-2024, TNA began a talent exchange agreement with WWE's NXT brand, with selected NXT wrestlers beginning to appear on TNA programming, and TNA wrestlers beginning to make appearances on WWE NXT. WWE and TNA later confirmed a long-term partnership in January 2025.

On December 2, 2025, it was announced that Impact! would move to AMC and AMC+ beginning on the January 15, 2026 episode, at which time the program changed its title to TNA Thursday Night Impact!.

== Broadcast history ==
TNA Impact! originally premiered on Fox Sports Net, where it remained until May 2005. The show began broadcasting episodes via syndication in limited markets on Urban America Television (replacing the syndicated show Xplosion) and on the Internet between June 24 and September 16, 2005.

The company would eventually secure a deal with Spike TV, with the first episode airing on October 1, 2005. Impact! first began airing episodes on Saturday nights, before later moving to Thursday nights in April 2006. The show would briefly move to Monday nights in 2010 before returning to Thursdays in the spring of 2010, where it remained until 2014.

In 2015, the show moved to Destination America, initially airing on Friday nights, before moving to Wednesday nights on June 3, 2015, until its final broadcast on December 16, 2015.

From January 5, 2016, until January 4, 2019, Impact! aired weekly on Pop, with the show moving back to Thursday nights on July 21, 2016.

In October 2018, Impact! moved to 10pm ET on Thursdays nights.

On January 11, 2019, Impact! moved to Friday nights on Pursuit Channel and Twitch; Impact would be simulcast on Twitch until the July 29, 2021 episode. On January 15, 2020, Impact's Twitch channel was banned after a sexually implicit segment involving Rob Van Dam was aired during that week's episode; the ban would be lifted on January 22.

Beginning October 29, 2019, Impact! moved to Tuesday nights on AXS TV. On April 8, 2021, Impact! moved back to Thursday nights.

Impact! began additionally airing on Sportsnet 360 in Canada on January 2, 2025, following its loss of the Canadian rights of WWE weekly programming to Netflix. Beginning on January 23, 2025, TNA began occasionally broadcasting Impact! episodes live on AXS TV. Beginning on January 15, 2026, Impact! moved to AMC, retaining its Thursday night time slot.

=== Ratings ===
Channel and Timeslot (ET)	Years	Rating or Viewership
FSN (Fri. 3pm)	2004	0.2
FSN (Fri. 4pm)	2005	0.3
Spike (Sat. 11pm)	2005–2006	0.7
Spike (Thurs. 11pm)	2006	0.9
Spike (Thurs. 9pm)	2006–2007	1.0
Spike (Thurs. 9pm; 2hrs)	2007–2010	1.2
Spike (Mon. 9pm; 2hrs)	2010	0.7
Spike (Mon. 8pm; 2hrs)	2010	0.9
Spike (Thurs. 9pm; 2hrs)	2010–2012	1.1
Spike (Thurs. 8pm: 2hrs)	2012–2013	1.0
Spike (Thurs. 9pm: 2hrs)	2013–2014	1.0
Spike (Wed. 9pm: 2hrs)	2014	0.8
Destination America (Fri. 9pm: 2hrs)	2015	390,000
Destination America (Wed. 9pm: 2hrs)	2015	292,000
Pop (Tues. 9pm: 2hrs)	2016	332,000
Pop (Thurs. 8pm: 2hrs)	2016–2018	300,000
Pop (Thurs. 10pm: 2hrs)	2018–2019	230,000
Pursuit Channel (Fri. 10pm: 2hrs)	2019	195,000
AXS TV (Tues. 8pm: 2hrs)	2019–2021	174,000 (AXS; 2020 Q1); 147,000 (AXS; 2020 Q2)
AXS TV (Thurs. 8pm: 2hrs)	2021–2025	150,000 - 95,000
TNA+ (Thurs. 9pm: 2hrs)	2024–present	
AXS TV (Thurs. 9pm: 2hrs)	2025	
AXS TV (Thurs. 8pm: 2hrs)	2025-2026	
AMC (Thurs. 9pm: 2hrs)	2026–present	

== Production ==
=== Format ===
Generally, the show features four to seven matches over the course of the two hours, as well as numerous interviews and segments interspersed between the matches. Due to the nature of the wrestling business, advertisements for merchandise and upcoming pay-per-view events often serve as bookends for the commercial segments.

From June 2004 to March 2013, TNA programming was taped at Universal Studios Florida's Soundstage 21. The Soundstages at Universal were dubbed the "Impact Zone" by the company with the promotion's pay-per-views being also broadcast from that location until October 2006, when Bound for Glory emanated from the Compuware Arena in Plymouth Township, Michigan.

When the show was on Fox Sports Net, all matches had a time limit (10 minutes for normal singles matches and 30 minutes for title matches), and the program also utilized a score banner similar to other FSN sports broadcasts to display the opponents and match timer. In the event of a time limit draw, the winner was determined by the NWA Championship Committee, a group consisting of three veteran stars. Since leaving the channel, TNA discarded the time limit concept.

=== Commentators ===
Commentators	Dates
Mike Tenay and Don West	June 4, 2004 – August 13, 2009
Mike Tenay and Taz	August 20, 2009 – November 8, 2012; June 6, 2013 – November 19, 2014
Todd Keneley, Mike Tenay and Taz	November 15, 2012 – May 30, 2013
Josh Mathews and Taz	January 7, 2015 – April 10, 2015
Josh Mathews	April 17, 2015 – May 15, 2015
Josh Mathews and Da Pope D'Angelo Dinero	May 22, 2015 – March 2, 2017
Josh Mathews, Jeremy Borash and Da Pope D'Angelo Dinero	March 9, 2017 – August 10, 2017
Jeremy Borash and Josh Mathews	August 17, 2017 – February 1, 2018
Josh Mathews and Sonjay Dutt	February 8, 2018 – April 19, 2018
Josh Mathews and Don Callis	April 26, 2018 – March 24, 2020
Josh Mathews and Madison Rayne	March 31, 2020 – January 12, 2021
Matt Striker and D'Lo Brown	January 19, 2021 – May 20, 2021; July 22, 2021 – January 6, 2022
Josh Mathews and D'Lo Brown	May 27, 2021 – July 15, 2021
Tom Hannifan and D'Lo Brown	January 13, 2022
Tom Hannifan and Various Guest Commentators	January 13, 2022 – January 20, 2022
Tom Hannifan and Matthew Rehwoldt	January 27, 2022 – present

== On-air personalities ==
The show features various on-air personalities including the wrestlers, ring announcers, commentators, and on-screen authority figures. TNA also has had various recurring on-air segments hosted by members of the roster.

=== Recurring segments ===
Segment	Type	Host(s)	Period active	Notes
Rough Cut	Interview segment	TNA roster	February 2008 – April 2009	An in-depth interview about someone's life and career in professional wrestling. Also used as a video package interview to hype feuds between two or more wrestlers on occasion
$25,000 Fan Challenge	Wrestling challenge	Awesome Kong with Raisha Saeed	May 2008 – July 2008	A fan entered the ring to compete against Awesome Kong. If they won they got $25,000 and the Knockouts Championship. The contest ended when Taylor Wilde defeated Awesome Kong.
Karen's Angle	Interview segment	Karen Angle	July 2008 – October 2008	Karen hosted a talk show interview segment. The segment came to an end when the host took time off to focus on her family.
O.D.B.'s Angle; Trash Talking with O.D.B.	Interview segment	O.D.B.	November 2008 – December 2009	Took the place of Karen's Angle after she left the company.
Hardcore History 101	Interview segment	Mick Foley	February 2009 – April 2009	Behind the scenes stories from Foley's career.
Off the Wagon Challenge	Wrestling challenge	Beer Money (Bobby Roode and James Storm)	February 2009 – April 2009	Open challenge for Beer Money's World Tag Team Championship. If the challengers lost by pin or submission, the wrestler who was pinned or submitted is fired.
Double J Double M A Open Challenge	MMA challenge	Jeff Jarrett	December 2010 – January 2011	An open challenge hosted by Jeff Jarrett, where any fan who could make him submit in a mixed martial arts match, would win $100,000.
Championship Thursday	Title match	Hulk Hogan	September 2012 – December 2012	Once a month, a championship was put on the line and four challengers met with Hogan to convince him to give them the title shot.
Gut Check Challenge	Wrestling challenge	Jeremy Borash	April 2012 – July 2013	A challenge held once a month, where two wrestlers from the independent circuit wrestled each other, with three judges picking one of them and voting whether they should be signed to a contract based on their performance.
Open Fight Night	Wrestling challenge	Impact Roster	April 2012 – June 2013, January 2017, November 2025	Once per month, all matches on Impact are open challenges where a member of the Impact roster can call out any other Impact wrestler.
Gail Kim's Open Challenge	Wrestling challenge	Gail Kim with Lei'D Tapa	November 2013 – January 2014	Gail Kim issued a challenge to every woman outside the Knockouts Division to come and face her. If Kim is defeated she promised another match with the Knockouts Championship on the line. The contest ended when the returning Madison Rayne defeated Gail Kim.
Bram's Open Challenge	Wrestling challenge	Bram	June 10, 2015 – June 28, 2015	Bram issued a challenge to every past Impact wrestler to come and face him, At Slammiversary XIII Bram defeated Matt Morgan in a street fight in what was the last open challenge match.
Fact of Life	Interview segment	Eli Drake	April 26, 2016 – January 17, 2017	Eli Drake interviews members of the Impact roster. Used to instigate and continue feuds and to further storylines.

== See also ==
- List of professional wrestling television series
