= Mike Tenay =

American podcaster and former professional wrestling play-by-play announcer

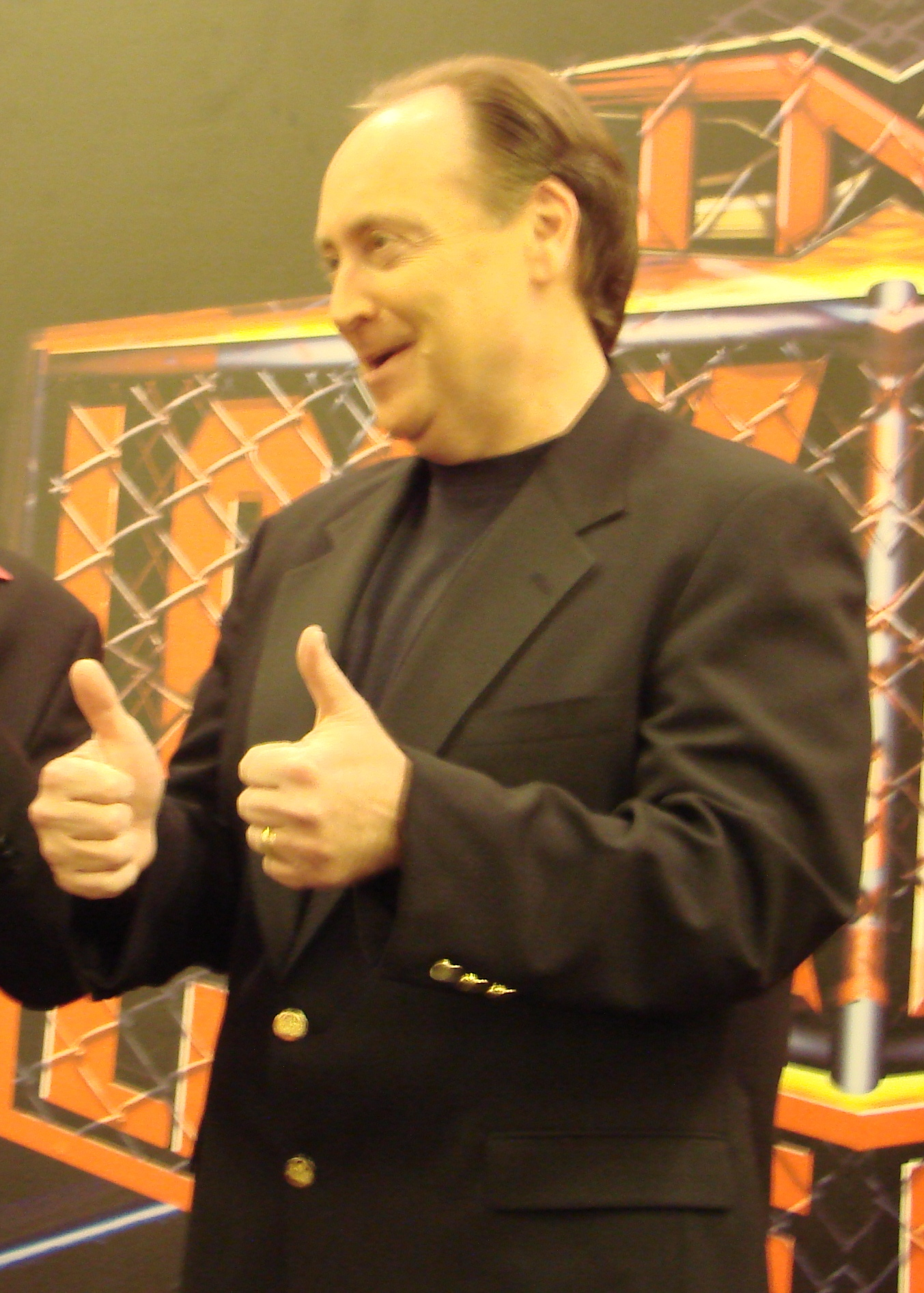
- Tenay in 2007
- Born: Michael William Tenay; March 1, 1955 (age 71); Los Angeles, California
- Occupation: professional wrestling commentator
- Employer(s): World Championship Wrestling (1994–2001); Total Nonstop Action Wrestling (2002–2016)
- Spouse: Karen Tenay (m. 1987)
- Children: 1
- Awards: TNA Hall of Fame

Michael William Tenay (born March 1, 1955) is an American podcast presenter and retired professional wrestling play-by-play announcer known for his time as an announcer for World Championship Wrestling (WCW) and Total Nonstop Action Wrestling (TNA, later Impact Wrestling). Tenay, according to Impact Wrestling, "is known as "The Professor" for his extensive knowledge of the sport". Former Impact Wrestling Executive Producer and WCW president Eric Bischoff has described Tenay as "a walking encyclopedia of knowledge".

Tenay is a five-time recipient of the Wrestling Observer award for Best Television Announcer, and was inducted into the Impact Hall of Fame (alongside longtime broadcast partner Don West) in 2023.

== Early life ==
Mike Tenay was born on March 1, 1955, in Los Angeles, California. In 1966, at age 11, Tenay began one of the country's first wrestling newsletters, Mat News. He also made audio recordings of Los Angeles wrestling programs and traded them with fans, a precursor to the tape traders who would follow. In the 1970s, Tenay wrote for the Olympic Auditorium's programs and several national wrestling magazines. After high school, he worked as a repairman and then a betting supervisor for a casino. From 1991–1995, Tenay talked about wrestling with the nationally aired late night sports talk radio show "Wrestling Insiders". He interviewed wrestling stars, including Jesse Ventura, Jim Cornette, and Sting. His work on radio led World Championship Wrestling (WCW) to hire Tenay to work on the WCW Hotline and do his on-location radio broadcasts at WCW events. This led to Tenay’s first major announcing assignments within WCW.

== Professional wrestling career ==
=== World Championship Wrestling (1994–2001) ===
Mike Tenay made his World Championship (WCW) announcing debut during the WCW co-promoted AAA When Worlds Collide pay-per-view in November 1994. Every announcer in WCW, including lead announcer Tony Schiavone, declined to work the broadcast. During this first broadcast, he and Chris Cruise called the match of Los Gringos Locos (Eddy Guerrero and Art Barr) vs. El Hijo del Santo and Octagón, judged by the Wrestling Observer Newsletter as a "legendary" five-star match. Following the success of that event, WCW added more Mexican luchadores to the roster, and Tenay would appear as a guest announcer during their pay-per-view matches due to his extensive knowledge of holds and maneuvers as well as lucha libre ring psychology. Tenay would later serve as a full-time play-by-play announcer for secondary television shows such as WCW Worldwide and WCW Saturday Night, where he was known as "Iron" Mike Tenay. He was also backstage interviewer for Uncensored 1995.

On September 2, 1996 he was moved up to the main show, WCW Monday Nitro, where he served as a third commentator to the team originally consisting of play-by-play announcer Tony Schiavone and color commentator Bobby Heenan. It was there that Schiavone gave him the nickname "The Professor" for his vast and impressive knowledge of the wrestling business, wrestling history, and wrestling maneuvers.

In light of WCW adding Thunder as another major weekly show in its lineup, the announce team was pulling double duty during the week. Tenay was named the lead announcer for WCW Thunder, with Schiavone and Heenan serving as the on-screen auxiliaries. He remained an announcer with WCW until its purchase by the World Wrestling Entertainment in 2001.

=== Total Nonstop Action Wrestling/Impact Wrestling (2002–2016, 2023) ===
==== Announcing positions (2002–2016) ====
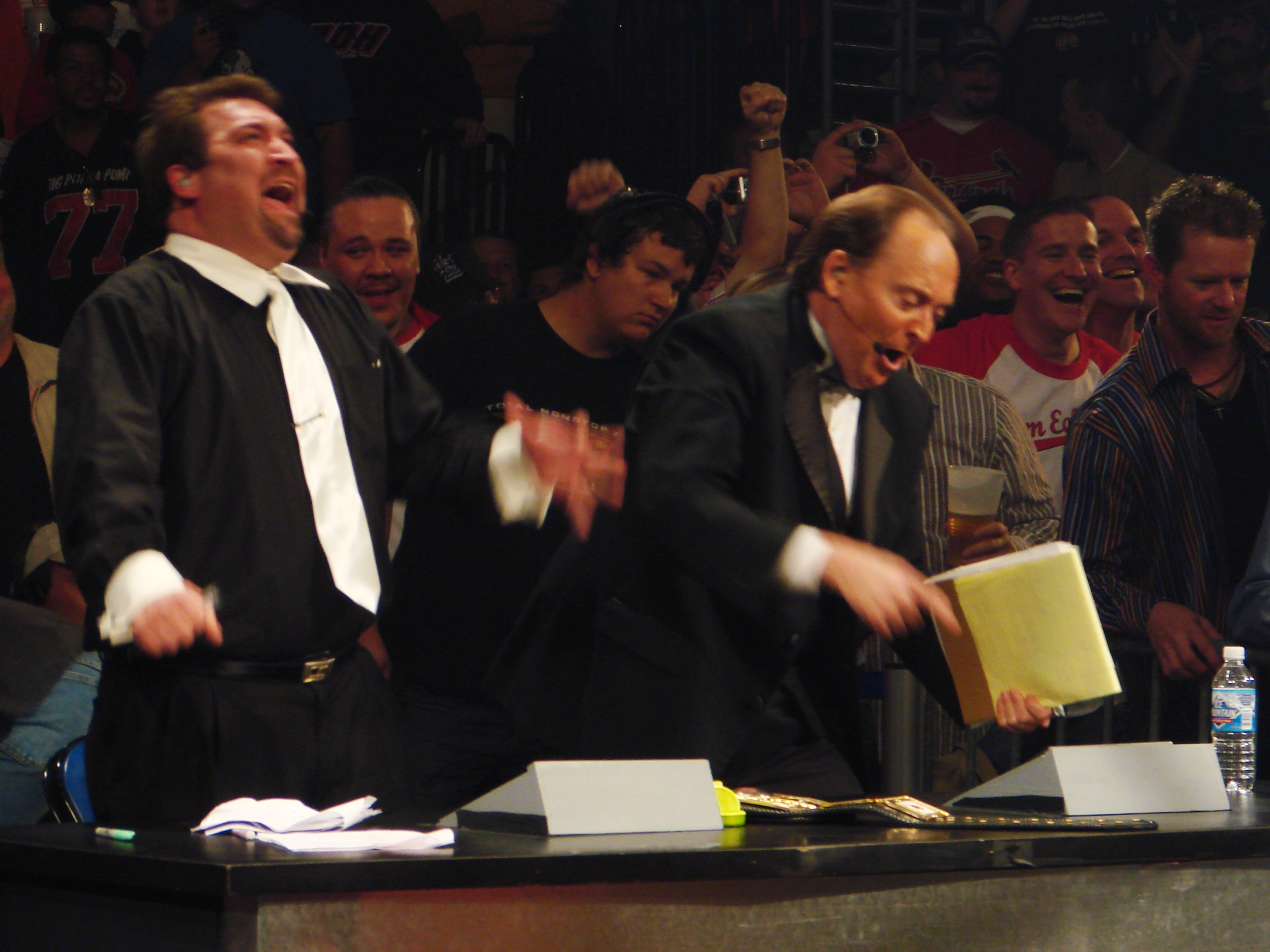
Tenay (right) and Don West (left) calling the action at Lockdown 2007

In early 2002, Tenay was approached by Jeff Jarrett regarding the play-by-play announcer's slot with Total Nonstop Action Wrestling (TNA). Tenay became the voice of the upstart company when it launched in June 2002. From that point onward, Tenay (now sporting a tuxedo at every event) became the voice of TNA, announcing the weekly pay-per-view events, every single episode of Impact Wrestling (originally TNA Impact!) and Xplosion, and every monthly pay-per-view until 2015.

Tenay's role for the company beyond that of play-by-play man has developed both in front of the camera and behind the scenes. After TNA decided to switch to a booking committee format in mid-2005, Tenay was named to the committee, enhancing his formerly modest influence behind the scenes. Tenay also became the prominent on-screen personality for TNA, conducting interviews with Jeff Jarrett (who has labeled Tenay as "the voice of the fans") as well as making major announcements (such as the signing of Sting).

Josh Mathews took Tenay's place as commentator on weekly airings of Impact Wrestling after its move from Spike to Destination America in January 2015. Following this, he briefly hosted Impact Wrestling: Unlocked until its cancellation, and sporadically appeared as backstage announcer or replacement commentator. As of December 2015, Tenay was still employed by TNA but had not appeared on television since July. Ahead of Impact Wrestling's debut on Pop in January 2016, Tenay said his future as an announcer on Impact Wrestling was uncertain. In 2015, Tenay also inducted Jeff Jarrett into the TNA Hall of Fame.

In June 2016, Tenay appeared on an episode of The Ross Report podcast with Jim Ross, where he explained that he had quietly departed TNA amicably and has retired from the wrestling business.

==== Hall of Fame (2023) ====
On September 8, 2023 during Impact Wrestling's Victory Road event, it was announced that Tenay and the late Don West would be inducted together into the Impact Hall of Fame to honor them being the promotion's original broadcast team. Tenay and West were inducted into the Hall of Fame on October 21, 2023 during the Bound for Glory event at Cicero Stadium.

== Other endeavors ==
In August 2015, Tenay announced on former wrestler Tazz's podcast the launch of his own podcast, Professor Vegas, through CBS Radio's Play.it platform, due to launch on August 6 of that same year. It would focus on sports betting, and feature Tenay's own expert analysis (he was a bookie in Las Vegas for ten years, and a lifelong betting fan) along with interviews with professional gamblers, bookies, linesmakers and athletes.

On July 22, 2016, Tenay tweeted "Sorry to report that I have not been able to reach agreement with CBS Radio for a second year of podcasts." The last recorded podcast was uploaded on June 14, 2016.

== Other media ==
He appeared in the video game TNA Impact! as a downloadable character.

=== Video games ===
Year	Title	Role	Notes
2008	TNA Impact!	Himself/Announcer	
2010	TNA Impact!: Cross the Line	Himself	

== Personal life ==
Tenay has been married to his wife Karen since 1987. They currently live in Las Vegas, Nevada.

== Awards and accomplishments ==
- Impact Wrestling
  - Impact Hall of Fame (2023 – alongside Don West)
- Wrestling Observer Newsletter
  - Best Television Announcer (1997, 2002–2005)

Preceded by Inaugural	TNA Impact! lead announcer 2004–2014	Succeeded by Josh Mathews
Preceded by Larry Zbyszko	WCW Nitro co-announcer 1996–2000	Succeeded by Mark Madden
