= TNA Xplosion =

Professional wrestling television program

- Logo used since 2026
- Also known as: NWA-TNA Xplosion; Impact Xplosion; GFW Xplosion
- Genre: Sports entertainment Professional wrestling
- Presented by: Mike Tenay (2002–2008, 2013–2014); Jeremy Borash (2008–2016); Josh Mathews (2015–2020); Matt Striker (2020–2021); Tom Hannifan (2024–present)
- Starring: TNA roster
- Opening theme: "Rise Up" by Lionel Fabert and Rebecca Lynn Schneider
- Country of origin: United States
- Original language: English
- No. of seasons: 18
- No. of episodes: 1004

Production
- Production locations: Tennessee State Fairground Sports Arena, Nashville, Tennessee (2002–2004, Early 2019); Impact Zone (Universal Studios Florida), Orlando, Florida (2004–2017, 2018–2019); Various arenas (2013–2014, 2017–2021, 2024–present)
- Camera setup: Multiple-camera setup
- Running time: 1 hour per episode (45 minutes plus commercials)
- Production company: Anthem Wrestling Exhibitions, LLC

Original release
- Network: Sun Sports (2002–2006); Syndication (2002-2008); Webcast (2008-2010); Extreme Sports Channel (UK: 2010); Challenge (UK: 2011–2017); 5Star (UK: 2017–2018); Twitch (2019–2021); TNA+ (2024–present); YouTube (2024–present)
- Release: October 5, 2002 – present

Related
- TNA Impact! (2004–present); Before the Impact (2021–2023)

TNA Xplosion is a professional wrestling television program that is produced by Total Nonstop Action Wrestling (TNA). Launched in 2002, the show features highlights from TNA's flagship television program Impact!, exclusive taped matches, and other content. It was mainly produced for international markets, though in later years, episodes would be distributed in the United States on Impact Plus (now TNA+).

Xplosion was cancelled in 2021, and its final episode aired on March 6. It was replaced by Before the Impact (BTI), which premiered two weeks earlier. Archived episodes continued to broadcast in Africa and India.

Following the company's rebranding to the TNA name on January 13, 2024, Xplosion relaunched as a web series on January 26, replacing BTI.

== Format and history ==
=== First run ===
TNA Xplosion was launched on November 27, 2002, as the promotion's first regular weekly syndicated show. In its original format, the show featured exclusive matches from the TNA Asylum at the Tennessee State Fairgrounds in Nashville, as well as exclusive interviews with members of the TNA roster.

On November 18, 2004, Xplosion was revamped as a recap of the previous week's Impact! episode in light of alterations in the taping schedule. The show would resume airing exclusive matches (billed as "Xplosion Xclusives") once more on October 7, 2005, in addition to recapping Impact!. These matches also aired on the TNA Global Impact! web show. "Xplosion Xclusives" matches normally featured wrestlers who rarely appeared during regular Impact! episodes. Occasionally, wrestlers may have made their debut or return on Xplosion and angles also took place.

Airings of Xplosion in the United States ceased at the end of 2006, although some of the exclusive matches could be seen on TNA Today. Starting on December 22, 2008, "Xplosion Xclusive" matches were also streamed on the promotion's website and YouTube channel.

Xplosion was revamped at the June 14, 2010 tapings of its 300th episode, now featuring more original matches with Jeremy Borash and Mike Tenay on commentary. In addition to the format changes, Xplosion received a new logo, graphics package and theme music performed by Taproot. The show would also feature a segment called "Spin Cycle", where Borash had a Q&A session with various TNA stars in front of a live crowd.

In 2013, Xplosion began including matches from the promotion's early years and matches prior to the upcoming PPV event. Beginning in December of that year, Rockstar Spud replaced long term color commentator Mike Tenay.

In early 2017, as the promotion officially changed its name to Impact Wrestling, the show gradually became known as simply Xplosion (and later, Impact Xplosion). On October 10, 2017, Xplosion launched on Global Wrestling Network, making the program available in the U.S. for the first time since 2006. By 2019, the show was streaming on Wednesdays 7PM ET on Impact Wrestling's Twitch channel and Impact Plus.

On March 3, 2021, PWinsider reported that production had halted on new Xplosion episodes. Later that month, it was reported in Wrestling Observer Newsletter that the show had been cancelled to focus on Before the Impact.

=== Revival (2024–present) ===
On January 14, 2024, at the Impact! "Snake Eyes" TV taping event, the promotion would begin taping matches for the return of TNA Xplosion for the first time in 3 years. The show officially returned on January 26, 2024; with new episodes premiering on Fridays on TNA+, and uploaded the following Tuesday to TNA's YouTube channel.

== See also ==
- TNA Xplosion Championship Challenge
