= Before the Impact =

American professional wrestling TV program

- Before the Impact logo
- Also known as: BTI
- Genre: Professional wrestling
- Presented by: Josh Mathews; Gia Miller; George Iceman
- Starring: Impact roster
- Country of origin: United States
- Original language: English
- No. of episodes: 141

Production
- Camera setup: Multicamera setup
- Running time: 60 minutes

Original release
- Network: AXS TV (2021–2022); Impact Plus (2022–2023); YouTube (2022-2023)
- Release: February 16, 2021 – October 19, 2023

Related
- TNA Xplosion (2002-2021, 2024-present); TNA Impact! (2004-present)

Before the Impact, or simply BTI, is a professional wrestling streaming television program produced by the American promotion Total Nonstop Action Wrestling (TNA; then known as Impact Wrestling) that premiered on February 16, 2021, on AXS TV in the United States, owned by parent company Anthem Sports & Entertainment. The show would also be made available on TNA+, as well as the promotion's YouTube channel and Facebook page.

BTI is a pre-show airing before the weekly broadcast of the flagship show, Impact!, that features recaps, previews, and an exclusive match.

The show's final episode aired on October 19, 2023. In 2024, it was replaced by a revival of TNA Xplosion.

== History ==
On February 10, 2021, Impact Wrestling announced the launch of a new program called Before the Impact, which will lead into the weekly Impact! broadcast. Josh Mathews serves as both senior producer and co-host, alongside Impact interviewer Gia Miller, and, previously, Nashville sportscaster Jon Burton. BTI features previews of upcoming matches, interviews with the Impact roster, behind-the-scenes access, and an exclusive match. Insider George Iceman hosts a segment called “Iceman’s Intel”, which features news relating to the upcoming Impact episode.

The first BTI match featured Decay (Black Taurus and Crazzy Steve) (accompanied by Rosemary) facing XXXL (Acey Romero and Larry D). BTI would first crossover with Impact! on their June 3 episodes, when Josh Alexander faced T. J. Perkins for the X Division Championship in a 60-minute Iron man match. The match began on BTI and concluded in the opening minutes of Impact!.

== Personnel ==
The wrestlers featured on BTI take part in scripted feuds and storylines. Wrestlers are portrayed as heroes, villains, or less distinguishable characters in scripted events that build tension and culminate in a wrestling match or series of matches.

=== Commentators ===
Commentators	Dates
Matt Striker and D'Lo Brown	February 16, 2021 – May 20, 2021; July 22, 2021 – January 6, 2022
Josh Mathews and D'Lo Brown	May 27, 2021 – July 15, 2021
Tom Hannifan and D'Lo Brown	January 13, 2022
Tom Hannifan and Various Guest Commentators	January 13, 2022 – January 20, 2022
Tom Hannifan and Matthew Rehwoldt	January 27, 2022 – October 19, 2023

== Broadcast history ==
On April 8, 2021, BTI, along with Impact!, would move to Thursday nights.

Beginning with the January 20, 2022 episode, BTI moved to Impact Plus and Impact's YouTube channel and Facebook page. The move coincided with the return of New Japan Pro Wrestling programming to AXS TV.

Channel	Time slot	Years
AXS TV	Tuesday 7:00pm	February 16, 2021 - April 1, 2021
AXS TV	Thursday 7:00pm	April 8, 2021 – January 13, 2022
Impact Plus	Thursday 7:00pm	January 20, 2022 – October 19, 2023
