= Jeremy Borash =

American wrestling announcer (born 1974)

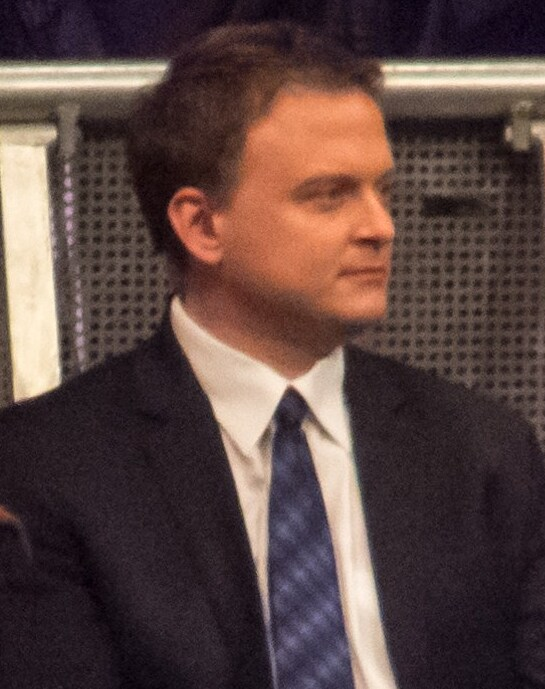
- Borash in 2013

Personal information
- Born: July 19, 1974 (age 52) Minnesota, U.S.
- Spouse: Vanessa De La Gala (m. 2021)

Professional wrestling career
- Ring name: Jeremy Borash
- Billed height: 5 ft 10 in (178 cm)
- Billed weight: 180 lb (82 kg)
- Debut: 1999

Jeremy Borash (born July 19, 1974) is an American professional wrestling play-by-play commentator, interviewer, ring announcer, host, booker, writer, and producer, who is currently employed by WWE as its Vice President of Content and Development.

He is best known for his tenure with Total Nonstop Action Wrestling (TNA), where he worked as a multifaceted staff member from the company's inception in 2002. In March 2017, he was appointed as the lead play-by-play commentator for its weekly TV program, Impact, after being mentored by Mike Tenay for many years. Borash left the promotion in 2018 for WWE.

Borash was also involved in the now-defunct World Championship Wrestling (WCW) and World Wrestling All-Stars (WWA) promotions in the late 1990s and early 2000s respectively.

== Radio career ==
Jeremy Borash was born near Minneapolis. He started a career in broadcasting at the age of 15, hosting both a nightly radio talk show and live television show in the Twin Cities. Borash's radio show on KSMM in Minneapolis and his television show Jeremy Borash Live! won several Minnesota broadcasting awards, as well as leading to on-air positions at KSTP and KDWB in the Twin Cities.

After graduating from Brown Institute for Broadcasting in Minneapolis, Borash took a position at the age of 19 as a program director/morning show host at KOOL 92 FM in Fort Dodge, Iowa. His popular Borash in the Morning show featured a wide variety of entertainment, including hypnotizing local politicians on the air, skydiving from 13,000 feet over Fort Dodge, and his popular breakfast drive through. During the drive through, Borash delivered free breakfasts to his listeners cars as they drove by. His involvement in local community activities included serving on the board of the United Way, as well as being the honorary chairman for the March of Dimes. He received national attention becoming the youngest person ever nominated for radio's prestigious Marconi Award for Broadcasting as America's Small Market Personality of the Year in 1996.

Offers came from around the country, and Borash chose to move back to Minnesota, as morning show host of KXLP in Mankato, Minnesota. He lasted only four months in Mankato, citing major creative differences with management after a New York radio consultant directed the station to name his on-air persona "Flash Borash." Borash found redemption months later, as he helped launch the syndicated Ruth Koscielak Show, and as co-host, was back with the station group he was fired from months earlier through the show's midwest syndication. He returned to a radio show format as host of the Impact Wrestling Podcast with TNA Knockout Christy Hemme.

== Professional wrestling career ==
=== Early career ===
While working weekdays on the Koscielak show in Minneapolis, Borash started a weekly Saturday morning wrestling show at the very station he began working with when he was 15. Through the show, he met Bob Ryder, an online wrestling executive who quickly pitched the show concept to Eric Bischoff of Ted Turner's World Championship Wrestling (WCW).

=== World Championship Wrestling (1999–2001) ===
In March 1999, WCW Live! premiered to an online audience with their first guest on the show, Hollywood Hogan. WCW Live! became the most listened to streaming audio program in the world, often reaching 50 thousand live audio streams nightly. While doing the nightly two hour internet show for WCW, Borash continued a stint on the Ruth Koscielak Show until August 1999, when he left Minneapolis to work full-time in the offices of WCW in Atlanta. He was one of the head writers for WCW Monday Nitro on TNT in the city, as well as WCW Thunder on TBS.

Later in 1999, Borash premiered on WCW TV, co-hosting the year end special for WCW on TBS. He made several appearances on WCW television as a play-by-play announcer for Nitro and Thunder. His role eventually led to an on-air character as Vince Russo's stooge, including a memorable episode where Borash was attacked by Goldberg (Bill Goldberg) while driving Russo in his own popemobile vehicle at the Cow Palace in San Francisco.

=== World Wrestling All-Stars (2001–2002) ===
After the WWF purchased WCW in March 2001, Borash met Australian concert promoter Andrew McManus and together they launched the World Wrestling All-Stars organization. Later in 2001, Borash left for Australia and worked out of the offices of McManus at Surfers Paradise on the Gold Coast in Queensland. The promotion's first tour of Australia concluded with a live pay per view from the Sydney SuperDome called "The Inception", where Borash provided play-by-play commentary alongside Jerry "The King" Lawler. The WWA produced numerous international tours as well as live pay per view events from Las Vegas; Glasgow, Scotland; Melbourne, Australia; and Auckland, New Zealand, with Borash serving as executive producer and host.

=== Total Nonstop Action Wrestling / Impact Wrestling (2002–2018) ===
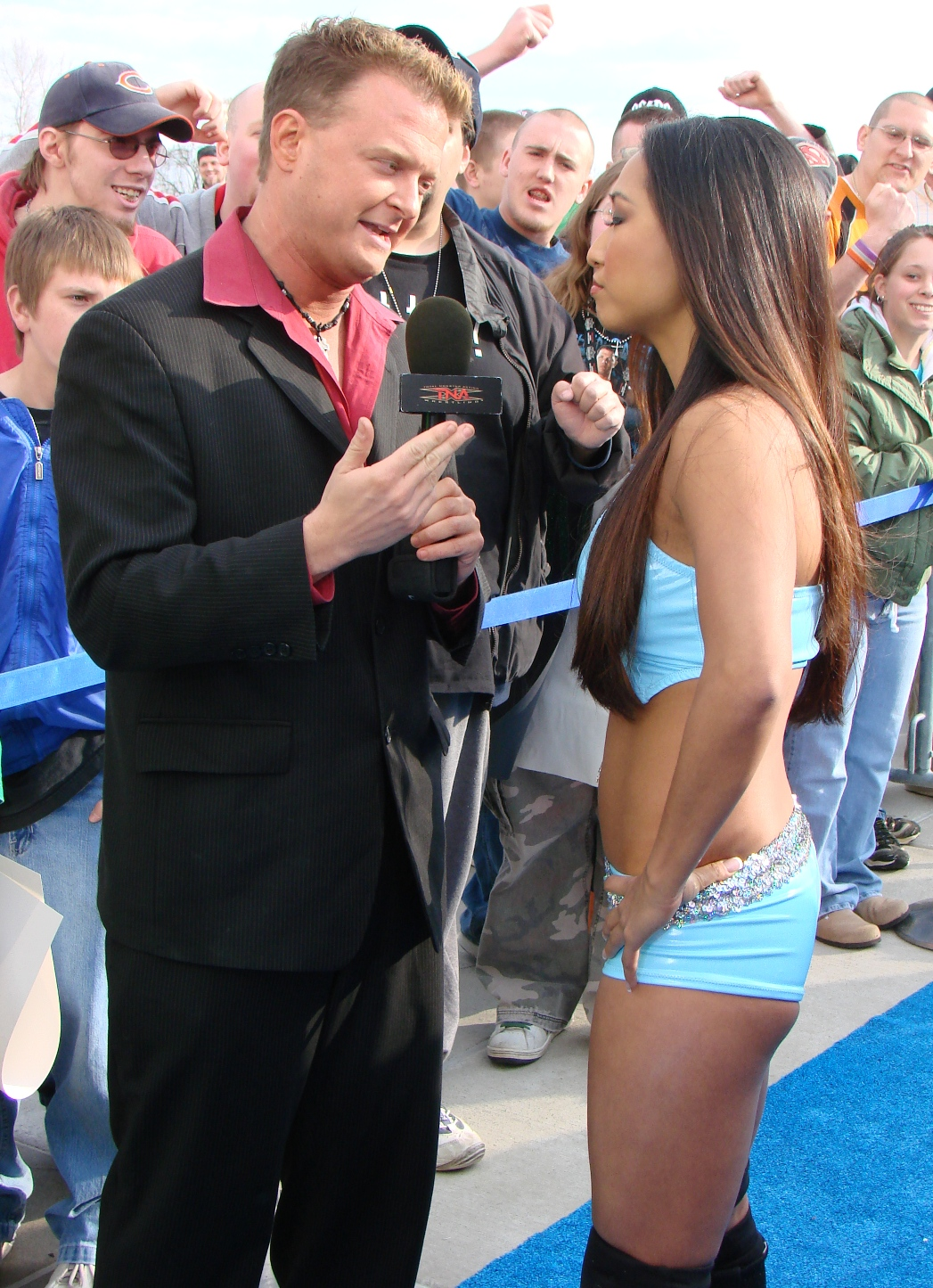
Borash interviewing Gail Kim prior to Lockdown, April 2007

In March 2002, Borash returned to the United States to join Jeff Jarrett in launching TNA Wrestling in Nashville. As the second employee the company hired, Borash worked in several positions for the organization including ring announcer, video editor, and show writer. In January 2006, he became the backstage interviewer for TNA's Impact! on Spike TV, a position he dreamed of as a child, watching his idol Gene Okerlund in the American Wrestling Association (AWA) growing up in Minneapolis. Since becoming backstage interviewer, Borash actually became involved with the kayfabe politics of TNA, as his respect for Kurt Angle led him to be a constant presence during many of Angle's backstage segments and gained him membership into Angle's stable, the Angle Alliance. He was humorously Karen Angle's maid of honor at her wedding vows renewal to Kurt on the Valentine's Day edition of Impact!.

In April 2007, Borash launched TNA Today on TNAWrestling.com, a show he hosted from the TNA corporate offices. In early 2008, he announced that Samoa Joe was voted the MVP of TNA. Joe then attacked Borash, thus (kayfabe) injuring him, which resulted in Borash wearing a neck brace on television. Borash has gone on to become the host of Internet-based TNA Spin Cycle which aired on TNA's YouTube channel. On January 17, 2010, at Genesis new executive producer Eric Bischoff took Borash off television. After Mick Foley agreed to work with Bischoff, Borash was brought back as the backstage interviewer on February 14 at Against All Odds. At Sacrifice, Borash he was made the ring announcer. On June 14, 2010, he began working as the lead play-by-play commentator for TNA Xplosion. He worked as the color commentator beside Mike Tenay on July 10, 2011, at the Destination X pay-per-view. On October 25, 2012, Borash and Todd Keneley, in his debut, working as the announcers for the first hour of impact!. In TNA Xplosion on June 12, he was a commentator with Mike Tenay. Borash assumed duties as TNA Wrestling's director of Social Media and took over marketing online for the company. He was the executive producer of the UK's Challenge TV exclusive British Boot Camp, a reality show featuring four aspiring U.K. wrestlers competing for a TNA contract. While interviewing Ethan Carter III, Borash was engaged in a feud with him after he interfered to help Rockstar Spud. While Carter and his bodyguard Tyrus tried to shave Spud's head but due to interference of Borash, the attempt was failed. Rather than shaving Spud, Carter and Tyrus decided to shave Borash. That caused an alliance with Spud and Borash, with Borash saving Spud numerous other times from getting his head shaved. Ken Anderson and Mandrews began to help Spud as well. On February 20 on Impact Wrestling, Borash, Anderson, Mandrews and Spud made an attempt to shave Carter's head but Tyrus saved him. Tyrus, got shaved by Spud.

Beginning in April 2015, Borash began conducting backstage interview at the One Night Only pay-per-view events along with Christy Hemme and some impact! tapings. In addition, Borash was still the lead commentator for Xplosion until Josh Mathews took over. Beginning at Bound for Glory 2015, he went on hiatus until returned to interviewing on January 5, 2016. Also in 2016, Borash returned to Xplosion alongside Mathews and took over ring announcer position full-time while Hemme went on hiatus. On March 21, 2016, Borash returned to TNA Wrestling commentary for the night after Lashley attacked color commentator The Pope.

In March 2017, after being mentored by Tenay for many years, Borash was appointed as the lead play-by-play announcer for TNA Wrestling by executive producer Jeff Jarrett. He was involved in a feud with Matthews, a fellow announcer, which culminated at Slammiversary with a tag team match featuring Borash and Abyss against Mathews and Scott Steiner. On January 30, 2018, PWInsider reported that Borash had officially left Impact Wrestling, thus ending his long-standing tenure with TNA Wrestling.

=== WWE (2018–present) ===
Borash signed with WWE in January 2018. On May 8, 2020, he made his first appearance on WWE programming as a part of the 205 Live broadcast team with Tom Phillips. WWE COO Triple H credits Borash as being a true innovator. Borash was chosen as the director for the Undertaker's "Boneyard Match", which headlined Wrestlemania 36 and was voted 2020 WWE Match of the Year. Borash is the senior director of Content and Development working directly with Shawn Michaels on the NXT brand.

== Other media ==
While working for TNA, Borash began video editing and producing and with only a laptop and video camera, set out to make a documentary on ECW, the organization he credits for rekindling his childhood love for professional wrestling.

=== Hardcore Homecoming (2005) ===
Forever Hardcore led to Borash co-promoting Hardcore Homecoming, a reunion of ECW wrestlers in Philadelphia's famed Alhambra Arena, the place where it started. The Hardcore Homecoming event held the record for the largest gate of any independent show in wrestling history. It was considered a historical success for the era, culminating with a surprise barbwire rematch of one of the most famous matches in ECW history with Terry Funk vs Sabu vs Shane Douglas, with featured referee Mick Foley. The show led to a Hardcore Homecoming tour and the show's DVDs broke Billboard's Top 10 Sports and Rec DVD releases. The release of Forever Hardcore and Hardcore Homecoming in the UK debuted at No. 1 and No. 2 on the Sports and Recreational charts, over two years after their US release. The show holds the largest gate in the history of the ECW Arena, as a sellout with tickets ranging from $99–$149 and premiums given to all fans attending.

== Personal life ==
Borash and his longtime girlfriend, Vanessa De La Gala married in 2021.

== Filmography ==
=== Film ===
Year	Title	Role	Notes
2003	Head of State	"Wrestling announcer"	
2005	Forever Hardcore	Director	

=== Television ===
Year	Title	Role	Notes
2005	Blue Collar TV	Himself	With other TNA superstars
2026	Hulk Hogan: Real American	Himself	Netflix documentary

=== Video games ===
Year	Title	Role	Notes
2008	TNA Impact!	Himself / ring announcer	

== Awards and accomplishments ==
- The Baltimore Sun
  - Non-Wrestling Performer of the Year (2009)

Preceded by Josh Mathews	Impact! lead announcer 2017–2018	Succeeded by Josh Mathews
