= 2009 in professional wrestling =

2009 in professional wrestling describes the year's events in the world of professional wrestling.

== List of notable promotions ==
These promotions held notable events in 2009.

Promotion Name	Abbreviation	Notes
Consejo Mundial de Lucha Libre	CMLL	
Georgia Championship Wrestling	GCW	
Juggalo Championship Wrestling	JCW	
Lucha Libre AAA Worldwide	AAA	The "AAA" abbreviation has been used since the mid-1990s and had previously stood for the promotion's original name Asistencia Asesoría y Administración.
National Wrestling Alliance New Jersey territory	NWA-NJ	
New Japan Pro-Wrestling	NJPW	
Pro Wrestling Guerrilla	PWG	
Ring of Honor	ROH	
Total Nonstop Action Wrestling	TNA	
World Wrestling Council	WWC	
World Wrestling Entertainment	WWE	WWE divided its roster into three storyline divisions, Raw, SmackDown, and ECW, referred to as brands, where wrestlers exclusively performed on their respective weekly television programs.

== Calendar of notable shows ==
=== January ===
Date	Promotion(s)	Event	Location	Main Event	Notes
3	WWC	Euphoria	Bayamón, Puerto Rico	The Sons of Tonga vs Los Aéreos (Hiram Tua y El Sensacional Carlitos)	
4	NJPW	Wrestle Kingdom III	Tokyo	Hiroshi Tanahashi defeated Keiji Mutoh (c) in a Singles match to win the IWGP Heavyweight Championship	
11	CMLL	La Hora Cero	Mexico City	Pierrothito defeated Shockercito in a 13-man Steel Cage "elimination" match	
11	TNA	Genesis	Charlotte	Mick Foley and The TNA Front Line (A.J. Styles and Brother Devon) defeated Cute Kip and The Main Event Mafia (Booker T and Scott Steiner) in a Six-man tag team hardcore match	
25	WWE: Raw; SmackDown; ECW	Royal Rumble	Detroit	Randy Orton won the 30-man Royal Rumble match by last eliminating Triple H to earn a world championship match at WrestleMania XXV	Randy Orton chose to challenge for the WWE Championship.
31	ROH	Caged Collision	Chicago Ridge	Brent Albright, Roderick Strong, Erick Stevens, Jay Briscoe and Ace Steel defeated Sweet & Sour Inc. (Adam Pearce, Tank Toland, Eddie Edwards, Davey Richards and Bobby Dempsey) in the Steel Cage Warfare match.	
(c) – denotes defending champion(s)

=== February ===
Date	Promotion(s)	Event	Location	Main Event
8	N/A	Eddie Graham Memorial Battle of the Belts	Brooksville, Florida	N/A
8	TNA	Against All Odds	Orlando	Sting (c) defeated Kurt Angle, Brother Ray and Brother Devon in a Fatal 4-Way match to retain the TNA World Heavyweight Championship
15	WWE: Raw; SmackDown; ECW	No Way Out	Seattle, Washington	Edge defeated John Cena (c), Rey Mysterio, Chris Jericho, Mike Knox, and Kane in the Elimination Chamber match to win the World Heavyweight Championship
(c) – denotes defending champion(s)

=== March ===
Date	Promotion(s)	Event	Location	Main Event
15	AAA	Rey de Reyes	Guadalajara, Jalisco, Mexico	Rey de Reyes Finals Elimination match
15	TNA	Destination X	Orlando	Sting (c) defeated Kurt Angle in a Singles match to retain the TNA World Heavyweight Championship with Jeff Jarrett as the special guest referee and Mick Foley as the special guest enforcer.
(c) – denotes defending champion(s)

=== April ===
Date	Promotion(s)	Event	Location	Main Event
4	ROH	Take No Prisoners	Houston	Kenta and Tyler Black defeated Austin Aries and Katsuhiko Nakajima in a tag team match
5	WWE: Raw; SmackDown; ECW	WrestleMania 25	Houston	Triple H (c) defeated Randy Orton in a Singles match to retain the WWE Championship; Had Triple H been counted out or disqualified, he would have lost the title
12	CMLL	53. Aniversario de Arena México	Mexico City, Mexico	Negro Casas (c) defeated Místico in a Best two-out-of-three falls match for the CMLL World Welterweight Championship
19	TNA	Lockdown	Philadelphia	Mick Foley defeated Sting (c) in a Six Sides of Steel Cage match to win the TNA World Heavyweight Championship
26	WWE: Raw; SmackDown; ECW	Backlash	Providence	Edge defeated John Cena (c) in a Last Man Standing match to win the World Heavyweight Championship
(c) – denotes defending champion(s)

=== May ===
Date	Promotion(s)	Event	Location	Main Event
3	NJPW	Wrestling Dontaku	Fukuoka	Hiroshi Tanahashi (c) defeated Hirooki Goto in a Singles match to retain the IWGP Heavyweight Championship
17	WWE: Raw; SmackDown; ECW	Judgment Day	Rosemont	Edge (c) defeated Jeff Hardy in a Singles match to retain the World Heavyweight Championship
24	TNA	Sacrifice	Orlando	Sting defeated Mick Foley, Kurt Angle and Jeff Jarrett in a Four-way Ultimate Sacrifice match
(c) – denotes defending champion(s)

=== June ===
Date	Promotion(s)	Event	Location	Main Event	Notes
7	WWE: Raw; SmackDown; ECW	Extreme Rules	New Orleans	Jeff Hardy defeated Edge (c) in a Ladder match to win the World Heavyweight Championship, then CM Punk cashed in his Money in the Bank contract and defeated Jeff Hardy (c) to win the World Heavyweight Championship.	Final PPV appearance for Umaga
13	AAA	Triplemanía XVII	Mexico City, Mexico	Team AAA (El Hijo del Santo, La Parka, Vampiro, Octagón, and Jack Evans) defeated La Legion Extranjera (Silver King, Chessman, Kenzo Suzuki, Electroshock, and Teddy Hart) in a Six Sided Steel cage match for control of AAA	
18	NJPW	Dominion	Osaka	Hiroshi Tanahashi defeated Manabu Nakanishi (c) in a Singles match to win the IWGP Heavyweight Championship	
21	TNA	Slammiversary	Auburn Hills	Kurt Angle defeated Mick Foley (c), Jeff Jarrett, A.J. Styles and Samoa Joe in the King of the Mountain match to win the TNA World Heavyweight Championship	
28	WWE: Raw; SmackDown; ECW	The Bash	Sacramento	Randy Orton (c) defeated Triple H 2-1 in a Three Stages of Hell match to retain the WWE Championship	
(c) – denotes defending champion(s)

=== July ===
Date	Promotion(s)	Event	Location	Main Event
11	WWC	36th WWC Aniversario	San Juan, Puerto Rico	Ray Gonzalez defeated La Pesadilla
19	TNA	Victory Road	Orlando	Kurt Angle (c) defeated Mick Foley in a Singles match to retain the TNA World Heavyweight Championship
26	WWE: Raw; SmackDown; ECW	Night of Champions	Philadelphia	Jeff Hardy defeated CM Punk (c) in a Singles match to win the World Heavyweight Championship
31	CMLL	Infierno en el Ring	Mexico City, Mexico	15-man Infierno en el Ring, Lucha de Apuestas hair vs. hair Steel cage match
(c) – denotes defending champion(s)

=== August ===
Date	Promotion(s)	Event	Location	Main Event	Notes
9	JCW	Bloodymania III	Cave-In-Rock, Illinois	10-man Tag Team match	
7-16	NJPW	G1 Climax final	Tokyo	Togi Makabe defeated Shinsuke Nakamura in a G1 Climax tournament	
16	TNA	Hard Justice	Orlando	Kurt Angle (c) defeated Sting and Matt Morgan in a Three-way match to retain the TNA World Heavyweight Championship	
14	AAA	Verano de Escándalo	Zapopan, Mexico	Dr. Wagner Jr. (c) defeated El Mesias and Cibernético in a Steel cage match for the AAA Mega Championship.	
23	WWE: Raw; SmackDown; ECW	SummerSlam	Los Angeles	CM Punk defeated Jeff Hardy (c) in the Tables, Ladders, and Chairs match to win the World Heavyweight Championship	This event was Jeff Hardy's last PPV match in WWE until 2017, as he lost to CM Punk on the following SmackDown in Steel cage match in which the loser left WWE.
(c) – denotes defending champion(s)

=== September ===
Date	Promotion(s)	Event	Location	Main Event
13	WWE: Raw; SmackDown; ECW	Breaking Point	Montreal	CM Punk (c) defeated The Undertaker in a Submission match for the World Heavyweight Championship
17	GCW	Sixth Annual Fred Ward Memorial Show	Phenix City, Alabama	Jimmy Rave (c) defeated Murder One in a Singles match for the GCW Heavyweight Championship
18	CMLL	CMLL 76th Anniversary Show	Mexico City, Mexico	Místico defeated Negro Casas in a Best two-out-of-three falls Lucha de Apuestas mask vs. hair match
20	TNA	No Surrender	Orlando	A.J. Styles defeated Kurt Angle (c), Matt Morgan, Sting and Hernandez in a Five-way match to win the TNA World Heavyweight Championship (This was Hernandez's Feast or Fired title opportunity.)
26	AAA	Héroes Inmortales III	Monterrey, Mexico	Dr. Wagner, Jr. (c) defeated El Mesías in a Singles match for the AAA Mega Championship
26	NWA-NJ	Dennis Coralluzzo Invitational	Wayne, New Jersey	Crowbar defeated Judas Young in a tournament final
(c) – denotes defending champion(s)

=== October ===
Date	Promotion(s)	Event	Location	Main Event	Notes
4	WWE: Raw; SmackDown; ECW	Hell in a Cell	Newark	D-Generation X (Triple H and Shawn Michaels) defeated The Legacy (Cody Rhodes and Ted DiBiase) in a Hell in a Cell match	
18	TNA	Bound for Glory	Irvine	A.J. Styles (c) defeated Sting in a Singles match to retain the TNA World Heavyweight Championship	This event was Booker T's last PPV match in TNA
25	WWE: Raw; SmackDown; ECW	Bragging Rights	Pittsburgh	John Cena defeated Randy Orton (c) 6–5 in a 60-minute Iron Man match to win the WWE Championship; Had Cena lost, he would have been fired from Raw.	
(c) – denotes defending champion(s)

=== November ===
Date	Promotion(s)	Event	Location	Main Event
8	NJPW	Destruction	Tokyo	Shinsuke Nakamura (c) defeated Hiroshi Tanahashi in a Singles match to retain the IWGP Heavyweight Championship
15	TNA	Turning Point	Orlando	A.J. Styles (c) defeated Daniels and Samoa Joe in a Three-way match to retain the TNA World Heavyweight Championship
20-21	PWG	Battle of Los Angeles	Reseda, California	Kenny Omega defeated Roderick Strong in a Battle of Los Angeles tournament
22	WWE: Raw; SmackDown; ECW	Survivor Series	Washington, D.C.	John Cena (c) defeated Triple H and Shawn Michaels in a Triple threat match to retain the WWE Championship
(c) – denotes defending champion(s)

=== December ===
Date	Promotion(s)	Event	Location	Main Event
4	CMLL	Sin Salida	Mexico City, Mexico	El Texano Jr. and El Terrible defeated No Limit (Yujiro and Naito)
11	AAA	Guerra de Titanes	Madero, Tamaulipas, Mexico	El Mesías defeated Dr. Wagner Jr. (c) in a Domo De La Muerte cage match for the AAA Mega Championship
13	WWE: Raw; SmackDown; ECW	TLC: Tables, Ladders & Chairs	San Antonio	D-Generation X (Triple H and Shawn Michaels) defeated Jeri-Show (Chris Jericho and Big Show) (c) Tables, Ladders, and Chairs match for the Unified WWE Tag Team Championship
19	WWE: Raw; SmackDown; ECW	Tribute to the Troops	Joint Base Balad, Iraq	John Cena (c) defeated Chris Jericho in a Singles match for the WWE Championship
19	ROH	Final Battle	New York City	Austin Aries (c) wrestled Tyler Black to a time-limit draw in a Singles match for the ROH World Championship
20	TNA	Final Resolution	Orlando	A.J. Styles (c) defeated Daniels in a Singles match to retain the TNA World Heavyweight Championship
(c) – denotes defending champion(s)

== Accomplishments and tournaments ==
=== AAA ===
Accomplishment	Winner	Date won	Notes
Rey de Reyes	Electroshock	March 15	

==== AAA Hall of Fame ====
Inductee
Pepe "Tropi" Casas

=== DDT ===
Accomplishment	Winner	Date won	Notes
Young Drama Cup	Keisuke Ishii	October 25	

=== Sendai Girls ===
Accomplishment	Winner	Date won	Notes
Jaja Uma Tournament	Sendai Sachiko	April 19	

=== TNA ===
Accomplishment	Winner	Date won	Notes
TNA X Division Championship Tournament	Alex Shelley	January 11	
Team 3D Invitational Tag Team Tournament	Beer Money, Inc. (Robert Roode and James Storm)	May 24	
TNA Knockouts Tag Team Championship Tournament	Taylor Wilde and Sarita	September 20	
TNA Championship Series	Bobby Lashley	November 26	
New Year's Knockout Eve Tournament	ODB	December 31	

=== WWE ===
Accomplishment	Winner	Date won	Notes
Royal Rumble	Randy Orton	January 25	Winner received their choice of a championship match for either Raw's World Heavyweight Championship, SmackDown's WWE Championship, or the ECW Championship at WrestleMania XXV; Orton from Raw last eliminated Triple H to win and chose to challenge for SmackDown's WWE Championship, which Triple H had since won at Elimination Chamber, but Orton was unsuccessful against Triple H at WrestleMania.
Money in the Bank ladder match	CM Punk	April 5	Defeated Christian, Finlay, Kane, Kofi Kingston, Mark Henry, Montel Vontavious Porter, and Shelton Benjamin to win a world championship match contract; Punk from SmackDown cashed in the contract at Extreme Rules and won his own brand's World Heavyweight Championship from Jeff Hardy, who had just won the title from Edge.

==== WWE Hall of Fame ====
Category	Inductee	Inducted by
Individual	Stone Cold Steve Austin	Vince McMahon
Individual	Ricky "The Dragon" Steamboat	Ric Flair
Individual	"Cowboy" Bill Watts	Jim Ross
Individual	Howard Finkel	Gene Okerlund
Individual	Koko B. Ware	The Honky Tonk Man
Group	The Funks (Terry Funk and Dory Funk Jr.)	Dusty Rhodes
Group	The Von Erichs	Michael Hayes

==== Slammy Awards ====
Poll	Results
Tag Team of the Year	Jeri-Show (Chris Jericho and Big Show)
Breakout Star of the Year	Sheamus
Shocker of the Year	CM Punk forces Jeff Hardy to leave the company after Steel Cage Match victory
Match of the Year	Shawn Michaels vs. The Undertaker – WrestleMania XXV
Raw Guest Host of the Year	Bob Barker
Extreme Moment of the Year	Jeff Hardy jumps from ladder onto CM Punk at SummerSlam
Diva of the Year	Maria
The "Oh My" Moment of the Year	Michael Cole vomits on Chris Jericho at SmackDown's 10th Anniversary
Superstar of the Year	John Cena won a tournament to win the Superstar of the Year Award

== Awards and honors ==
=== Pro Wrestling Illustrated ===
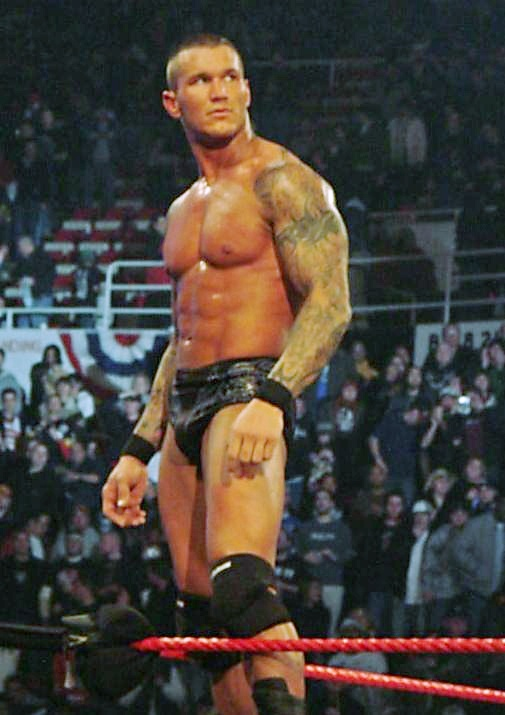
2009 PWI Wrestler of the Year, Randy Orton

Category	Winner
PWI Wrestler of the Year	Randy Orton
PWI Tag Team of the Year	Team 3D (Brother Ray and Brother Devon)
PWI Match of the Year	The Undertaker vs. Shawn Michaels (WrestleMania XXV)
PWI Feud of the Year	Randy Orton vs. Triple H
PWI Most Popular Wrestler of the Year	Jeff Hardy
PWI Most Hated Wrestler of the Year	Randy Orton
PWI Comeback of the Year	Jerry Lynn
PWI Most Improved Wrestler of the Year	John Morrison
PWI Most Inspirational Wrestler of the Year	Ricky Steamboat
PWI Rookie of the Year	Mike Sydal
PWI Woman of the Year	Mickie James
PWI Lifetime Achievement	Vince McMahon

=== Wrestling Observer Newsletter ===
==== Wrestling Observer Newsletter Hall of Fame ====
Category	Inductee
Individual	Konnan
Individual	Everett Marshall
Individual	Bill Miller
Individual	Masa Saito
Individual	Roy Shire
Group	The Midnight Express (Bobby Eaton, Stan Lane and Dennis Condrey)

==== Wrestling Observer Newsletter awards ====
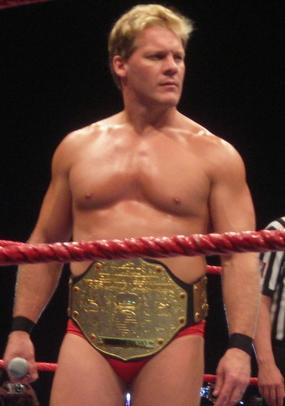
2009 Wrestling Observer Newsletter Wrestler of the Year, Chris Jericho

Category	Winner
Wrestler of the Year	Chris Jericho
Most Outstanding	Bryan Danielson
Feud of the Year	Jeff Hardy vs. CM Punk
Tag Team of the Year	The Kings of Wrestling (Chris Hero and Claudio Castagnoli)
Most Improved	The Miz
Best on Interviews	Chris Jericho

== Title changes ==
=== AAA ===
AAA Mega Championship
Incoming champion – El Mesias
Date	Winner	Event/Show	Note(s)
June 13	Dr. Wagner Jr.	Triplemanía XVII	
December 11	El Mesias	Guerra de Titanes	

AAA World Mini-Estrella Championship
Incoming champion – Mini Charly Manson
Date	Winner	Event/Show	Note(s)
December 11	Mini Abismo Negro	Guerra de Titanes	

AAA World Cruiserweight Championship
(Title created)
Date	Winner	Event/Show	Note(s)
May 21	Alex Koslov	AAA Television Taping	
June 13	Xtreme Tiger	Triplemanía XVII	
August 21	Alex Koslov	Verano de Escándalo	
August 30	Vacated	AAA Television Taping	
September 26	Xtreme Tiger	Héroes Inmortales III	

AAA World Tag Team Championship
Incoming champions – La Hermandad 187 (Joe Líder and Nicho el Millonario)
Date	Winner	Event/Show	Note(s)
No title changes			

AAA World Mixed Tag Team Championship
Incoming champions – Cynthia Moreno and El Oriental
Date	Winner	Event/Show	Note(s)
September 6	Aero Star and Faby Apache	AAA Television Taping	

=== NJPW ===
IWGP Heavyweight Championship
Incoming champion – Keiji Mutoh
Date	Winner	Event/Show	Note(s)
January 4	Hiroshi Tanahashi	Wrestle Kingdom III	
May 6	Manabu Nakanishi	Dissidence	
June 20	Hiroshi Tanahashi	Dominion 6.20	
August 29	Vacated	–	Title vacated due to Tanahashi fracturing his eye socket.
September 27	Shinsuke Nakamura	Circuit2009 New Japan Generation tour	Nakamura defeated Togi Makabe to win the vacant title.

IWGP Tag Team Championship
Incoming champions – RISE (Giant Bernard and Travis Tomko)
Date	Winner	Event/Show	Note(s)
January 4	Team 3D (Brother Ray and Brother Devon)	Wrestle Kingdom III in Tokyo Dome	
July 21	The British Invasion (Brutus Magnus and Doug Williams)	TNA Impact!	
October 18	Team 3D (Brother Ray and Brother Devon)	Bound for Glory	

IWGP Junior Heavyweight Championship
Incoming champion – Wataru Inoue
Date	Winner	Event/Show	Note(s)
January 4	Tiger Mask	Wrestle Kingdom III in Tokyo Dome	
August 15	Místico	G1 Climax 2009: New Lords, New Laws	
November 8	Tiger Mask	Destruction '09	

IWGP Junior Heavyweight Tag Team Championship
Incoming champions – No Limit (Tetsuya Naito and Yujiro Takahashi)
Date	Winner	Event/Show	Note(s)
January 4	The Motor City Machine Guns (Alex Shelley and Chris Sabin)	Wrestle Kingdom III in Tokyo Dome	
July 5	Apollo 55 (Prince Devitt and Ryusuke Taguchi)	Circuit2009 New Japan Soul	

=== ROH ===
ROH World Championship
Incoming champion – Nigel McGuinness
Date	Winner	Event/Show	Note(s)
April 3	Jerry Lynn	Supercard of Honor IV	
June 13	Austin Aries	Manhattan Mayhem III	

ROH World Tag Team Championship
Incoming champions – The Age of the Fall (Jimmy Jacobs and Tyler Black)
Date	Winner	Event/Show	Note(s)
April 10	The American Wolves (Davey Richards and Eddie Edwards)	Ring of Honor Wrestling	
December 19	The Briscoe Brothers (Jay and Mark Briscoe)	Final Battle	

=== TNA ===
TNA World Heavyweight Championship
Incoming champion – Sting
Date	Winner	Event/Show	Note(s)
April 19	Mick Foley	Lockdown	This was a six sides of steel cage match
June 21	Kurt Angle	Slammiversary	This was a King of the Mountain match also involving A.J. Styles, Jeff Jarrett and Samoa Joe
September 20	A.J. Styles	No Surrender	This was a five-way match also involving Hernandez, Matt Morgan and Sting

TNA X Division Championship
Incoming champion – Vacant
Date	Winner	Event/Show	Note(s)
January 11	Alex Shelley	Genesis	
March 15	Suicide	Destination X	
June 25	Homicide	Impact!	
August 16	Samoa Joe	Impact!	
October 5	Amazing Red	Impact!	

TNA World Tag Team Championship
Incoming champions – Jay Lethal and Consequences Creed
Date	Winner	Event/Show	Note(s)
January 11	Beer Money, Inc. (James Storm and Robert Roode)	Genesis	
April 19	Team 3D (Brother Devon and Brother Ray)	Lockdown	
June 21	Beer Money, Inc. (James Storm and Robert Roode)	Slammiversary	
July 19	The Main Event Mafia (Booker T and Scott Steiner)	Victory Road	
October 18	The British Invasion (Brutus Magnus and Doug Williams)	Bound for Glory	

TNA Knockouts Tag Team Championship
(Title created)
Date	Winner	Event/Show	Note(s)
September 20	Sarita and Taylor Wilde	No Surrender	

TNA Women's Knockout Championship
Incoming champion – Awesome Kong
Date	Winner	Event/Show	Note(s)
April 19	Angelina Love	Lockdown	
June 25	Tara	Impact!	
July 19	Angelina Love	Victory Road	
August 16	ODB	Hard Justice	
August 27	Vacated	Impact!	
September 20	ODB	No Surrender	
December 20	Tara	Final Resolution	

TNA Television Championship
Incoming champion – Booker T
Date	Winner	Event/Show	Note(s)
March 15	A.J. Styles	Destination X	
July 19	Kevin Nash	Victory Road	
July 22	Mick Foley	Impact!	
August 16	Kevin Nash	Hard Justice	
October 18	Eric Young	Bound for Glory	

=== WWE ===
– Raw
– SmackDown
- ECW

Raw and SmackDown each had a world championship, a secondary championship, a women's championship, and a male tag team championship until their respective tag team titles became shared across all the brands. ECW only had a world championship.

World Heavyweight Championship
Incoming champion – John Cena
Date	Winner	Event/Show	Note(s)
February 15	Edge	No Way Out	Elimination Chamber match, also involving Chris Jericho, Rey Mysterio, Mike Knox, and Kane. Edge, a member of the SmackDown roster, attacked Kofi Kingston and replaced him in the match.
The title became exclusive to the SmackDown brand due to Edge being a member of the SmackDown roster.
April 5	John Cena	WrestleMania XXV	Triple threat match, also involving Big Show.
The title became exclusive to the Raw brand due to John Cena being a member of the Raw roster.
April 26	Edge	Backlash	Last Man Standing match.
The title became exclusive to the SmackDown brand due to Edge being a member of the SmackDown roster.
June 7	Jeff Hardy	Extreme Rules	Ladder match
June 7	CM Punk	Extreme Rules	Cashed in his Money in the Bank contract.
July 26	Jeff Hardy	Night of Champions	
August 23	CM Punk	SummerSlam	Tables, Ladders, and Chairs match
October 4	The Undertaker	Hell in a Cell	Hell in a Cell match

WWE Championship
Incoming champion – Jeff Hardy
Date	Winner	Event/Show	Note(s)
January 25	Edge	Royal Rumble	No disqualification match
February 15	Triple H	No Way Out	Elimination Chamber match, also involving Jeff Hardy, Vladimir Kozlov, The Undertaker, and Big Show.
The title became exclusive to the Raw brand following the 2009 WWE draft when Triple H was drafted to Raw.
April 26	Randy Orton	Backlash	Six-man tag team match with Orton, Ted DiBiase, and Cody Rhodes against Triple H, Shane McMahon, and Batista. Orton won the championship due to his team winning.
June 7	Batista	Extreme Rules	Steel cage match
June 9	Vacated	—	Vacated when Batista suffered a torn left biceps.
June 15	Randy Orton	Monday Night Raw	Fatal four-way match for the vacant title, also involving Triple H, John Cena, and Big Show.
September 13	John Cena	Breaking Point	"I Quit" match. If anyone interfered on Randy Orton's behalf, he would have forfeited the title.
October 4	Randy Orton	Hell in a Cell	Hell in a Cell match
October 25	John Cena	Bragging Rights	60-minute Anything Goes Iron Man match in which Cena won 6–5. If Cena lost, he would have had to leave the Raw brand.
December 13	Sheamus	TLC: Tables, Ladders & Chairs	Tables match

ECW Championship
Incoming champion – Matt Hardy
Date	Winner	Event/Show	Note(s)
January 12 (aired January 13)	Jack Swagger	ECW	
April 26	Christian	Backlash	
June 7	Tommy Dreamer	Extreme Rules	Triple threat hardcore match, also involving Jack Swagger. With this win, Tommy Dreamer became the only wrestler to win the title both in the original ECW promotion, and in the WWE sponsored revival.
July 26	Christian	Night of Champions	

WWE Intercontinental Championship
Incoming champion – William Regal
Date	Winner	Event/Show	Note(s)
January 19	CM Punk	Monday Night Raw	No disqualification match
March 9	John "Bradshaw" Layfield	Monday Night Raw	
April 5	Rey Mysterio	WrestleMania XXV	
The title became exclusive to the SmackDown brand following the 2009 WWE draft when Rey Mysterio was drafted to SmackDown.
June 7	Chris Jericho	Extreme Rules	No Holds Barred match
June 28	Rey Mysterio	The Bash	Mask vs. title match
September 1 (aired September 4)	John Morrison	SmackDown	
December 13	Drew McIntyre	TLC: Tables, Ladders & Chairs	

WWE United States Championship
Incoming champion – Shelton Benjamin
Date	Winner	Event/Show	Note(s)
March 17 (aired March 20)	Montel Vontavious Porter	SmackDown	
The title became exclusive to the Raw brand following the 2009 WWE draft when MVP was drafted to Raw.
June 1	Kofi Kingston	Monday Night Raw	
October 5	The Miz	Monday Night Raw	

WWE Women's Championship
Incoming champion – Beth Phoenix
Date	Winner	Event/Show	Note(s)
January 25	Melina	Royal Rumble	
The title became exclusive to the SmackDown brand following the 2009 WWE draft when Melina was drafted to SmackDown.
June 28	Michelle McCool	The Bash	With this victory, McCool became the first person to hold both the Women's and Divas Championships.

WWE Divas Championship
Incoming champion – Maryse
Date	Winner	Event/Show	Note(s)
The title became exclusive to the Raw brand following the 2009 WWE draft when Maryse was drafted to Raw.
July 26	Mickie James	Night of Champions	
October 12	Jillian Hall	Monday Night Raw	
October 12	Melina	Monday Night Raw	

World Tag Team Championship
Incoming champions – John Morrison and The Miz
Date	Winner	Event/Show	Note(s)
April 5	The Colóns (Carlito and Primo)	WrestleMania XXV	Lumberjack match to unify the World Tag Team Championship with the WWE Tag Team Championship.
At WrestleMania XXV, the World Tag Team Championship was unified with the WWE Tag Team Championship to become the Unified WWE Tag Team Championship. Both titles remained independently active, but were collectively defended on any brand as the Unified WWE Tag Team Championship.

WWE Tag Team Championship
Incoming champions – The Colóns (Carlito and Primo)
At WrestleMania XXV on April 5, The Colóns defeated John Morrison and The Miz to unify the WWE Tag Team Championship with the World Tag Team Championship to become the Unified WWE Tag Team Championship. Both titles remained independently active, but were collectively defended on any brand as the Unified WWE Tag Team Championship.

Unified WWE Tag Team Championship (World Tag Team Championship and WWE Tag Team Championship)
Incoming champions – The Colóns (Carlito and Primo)
Date	Winner	Event/Show	Note(s)
June 28	Edge and Chris Jericho	The Bash	Triple threat tag team match, also involving The Legacy (Cody Rhodes and Ted DiBiase).
July 26	Jeri-Show (Chris Jericho and Big Show)	Night of Champions	Shortly after Edge and Chris Jericho won the title, Edge suffered a torn Achilles tendon, which required surgery and forced him to vacate his half of the championship. Jericho was allowed to keep his title and choose a new partner; he chose Big Show at Night of Champions. WWE views this as a second reign for Jericho.
December 13	D-Generation X (Triple H and Shawn Michaels)	TLC: Tables, Ladders & Chairs	Tables, Ladders, and Chairs match

== Births ==
- February 21 – Saran

== Debuts ==
- Unknown month – Tony Deppen
- April – Bray Wyatt
- April 29 – Kazumasa Yoshida (Big Japan)
- May 6 – Kengo
- July 17 – Cedric Alexander
- July 18
  - Powerhouse Hobbs
  - Michio Kageyama
- August 1 – Trey Miguel
- August 14 - Zack Gibson
- August 15 – Big Cass
- August 17 – Apollo Crews/Uhaa Nation
- August 22 – Mia Yim
- August 23 – Soma Takao
- September – Aksana
- September 3 – Naomi
- September 6 – Toru Sugiura
- September 20 – Aoi Ishibashi (NEO Ladies)
- September 21 – Takumi Tsukamoto
- September 26
  - Robert Dreissker
  - Tamina Snuka
- October – Aaron Solo
- October 4 – Saya
- October 17 – Sam Stackhouse
- November 5 – Jun Masaoka
- November 21 – Tristan Archer
- November 23 – Akito
- November 27 – Alexander James
- December 6 – Alex Windsor
- December 12 - Flamita
- December 17 – Big E

== Retirements ==
- Lena Yada (January 4, 2008 – 2009)
- One Man Gang (1977-2009)
- Mike Shaw (1980-2009)
- Doug Basham (1993–2009)
- John Layfield (1992 – April 6, 2009) (moved to color commentator, later returned to compete at Royal Rumble 2014)
- David Flair (1999-May 15, 2009)
- Candice Michelle (November 15, 2004 – June 19, 2009) (although she had been fully inactive from in-ring competition since 2009, she announced her full retirement in December 2017)
- Sharmell (1998 – October 18, 2009)
- Jamie Noble (1995 – November 10, 2009) (semi-retired)
- Jon Heidenreich (2001 – November 28, 2009)
- Christy Hemme (July 15, 2004 – December 16, 2009) (moved to ring announcer)
- Azumi Hyuga (December 4, 1994 – December 27, 2009)

== Deaths ==
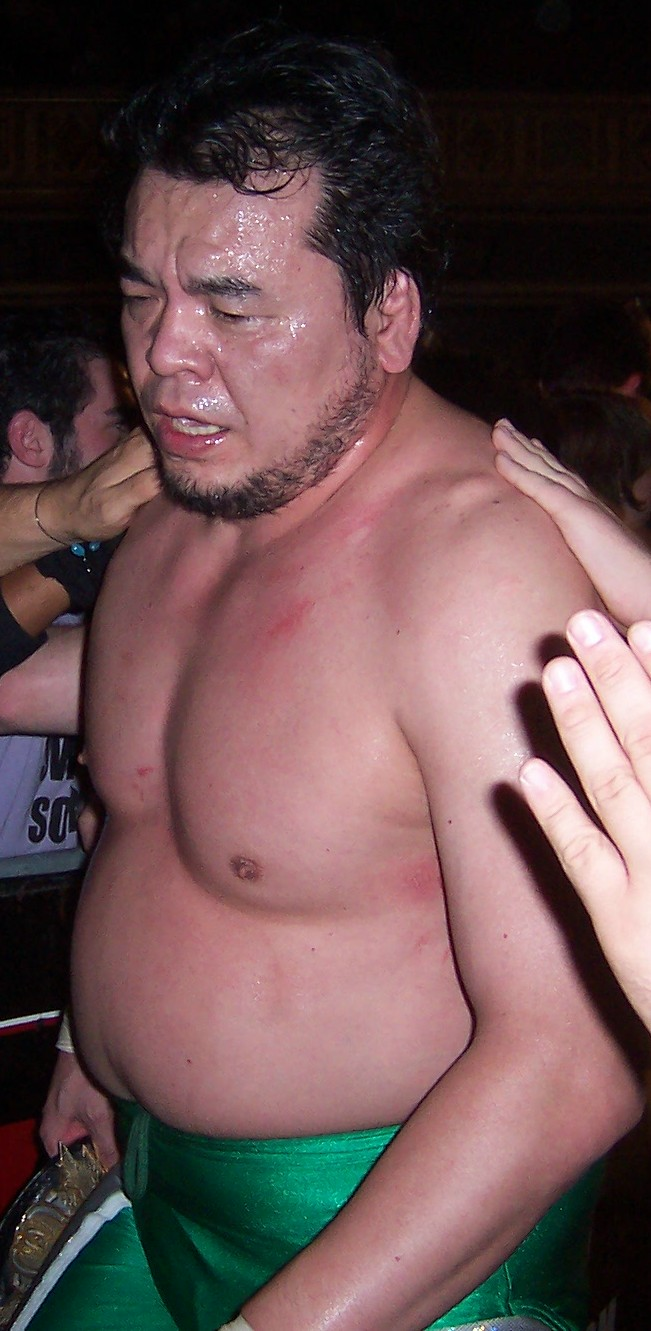
Mitsuharu Misawa

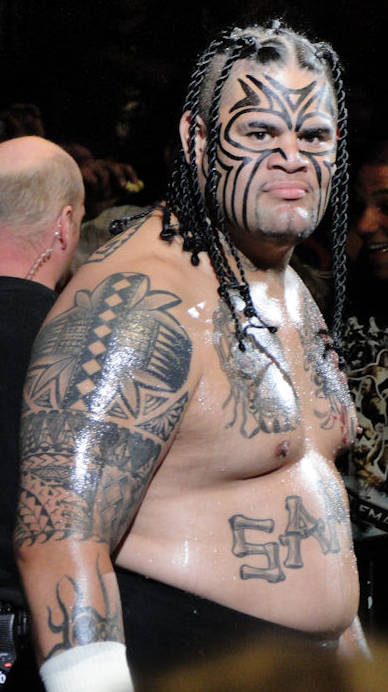
Umaga

- January 10 - Gil Mains, 79
- January 13 – Cousin Junior, 48
- January 16 – Paul E. Normous, 33
- February 2 - Jim Wilson (wrestler), 66
- March 2 - Robert Bruce (wrestler), 65
- March 4 – Yvon Cormier, 70
- March 13 – Test, 33
- March 22
  - Steve Doll, 48
  - Abismo Negro, 37
- April 28 – Buddy Rose, 56
- May 8 – Cynthia Peretti, 60
- May 28 - John Tolos, 78
- June 13 – Mitsuharu Misawa, 46
- June 22 – Billy Red Lyons, 77
- July 5 - Waldo Von Erich, 75
- July 22 - Damian Steele, 33/34
- August 5 – Al Tomko, 77
- August 12 - Karl Von Hess, 90
- August 27 - Shota Chochishvili, 59
- September 6 - Butcher Brannigan, 61
- September 10 - Kerry Brown (wrestler), 51
- October 14 – Lou Albano, 76
- October 18 - Ryuma Go, 53
- November 12 - Orig Williams, 78
- November 25 – Adam Firestorm, 32
- December 4 – Umaga, 36
- December 29 - Dr. Death Steve Williams, 49

== See also ==
- List of NJPW pay-per-view events
- List of ROH pay-per-view events
- List of TNA pay-per-view events
- List of WWE pay-per-view events
