= The Beautiful People (professional wrestling) =

Professional wrestling stable

- The Beautiful People logo

Stable
- Name(s): The Beautiful People; The BP's; Velvet-Love Entertainment; Mi Pi Sexy; Meanest Girls
- Former members: Angelina Love; Velvet Sky; Cute Kip; Madison Rayne; Lacey Von Erich
- Debut: December 2, 2007
- Disbanded: 2023
- Years active: 2007–2011, 2012, 2014–2016, 2023

The Beautiful People was a stable known for its time with Total Nonstop Action Wrestling (TNA) where Angelina Love, Velvet Sky, Madison Rayne, Lacey Von Erich and Cute Kip were all members throughout its several incarnations. The team is known for its narcissistic gimmick and holding the TNA Knockouts Championship and the TNA Knockouts Tag Team Championship simultaneously. Their characters were portrayed as arrogant blonde Barbie dolls, whose main goal as a team was to "cleanse" the TNA roster "one ugly person at a time", based on the belief that their physical attractiveness was greater than that of others in the company, however various incarnations have portrayed them as faces. Original members Angelina Love and Velvet Sky came up with the characters, inspired by Paris Hilton and Nicole Richie.

== Concept ==
The Beautiful People were vain and narcissistic prima donnas. After a brief initial period without these traits, they became villainous characters who emphasized an interest in looks and created the motto "cleansing the world, one ugly person at a time." The team was created by then-TNA booker Vince Russo, with Love and Sky drawing inspiration for their performance from celebrities like Paris Hilton and Nicole Richie and the movie Mean Girls.

Their fixation with physical beauty is emphasized when they use cosmetics and hair spray as weapons. They also favored placing paper bags over the heads of opponents they regarded as ugly, as a way of humiliating them.

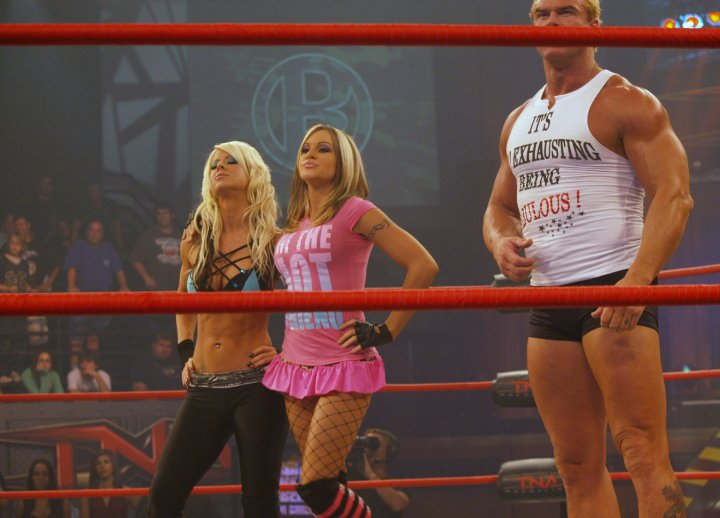
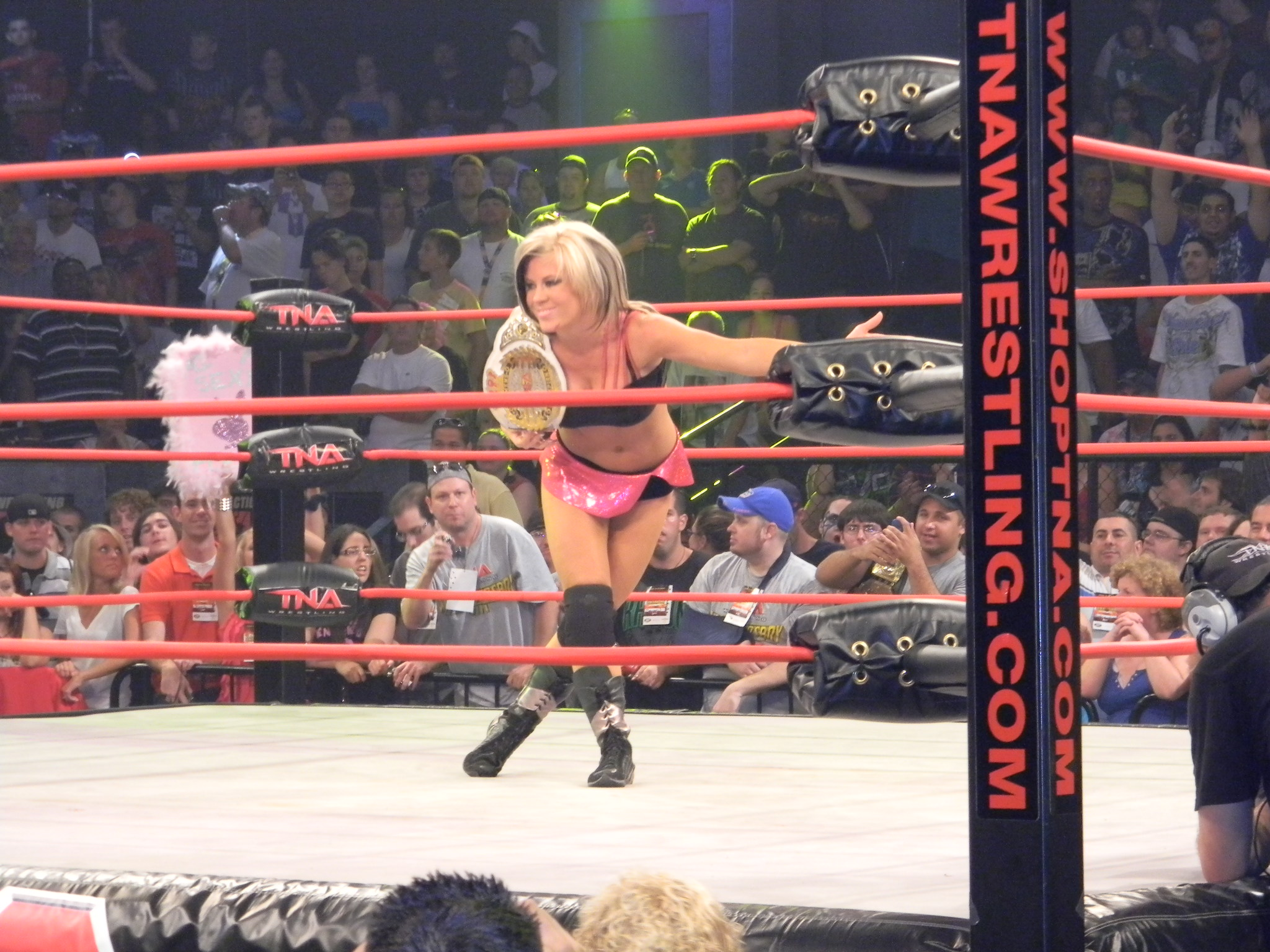
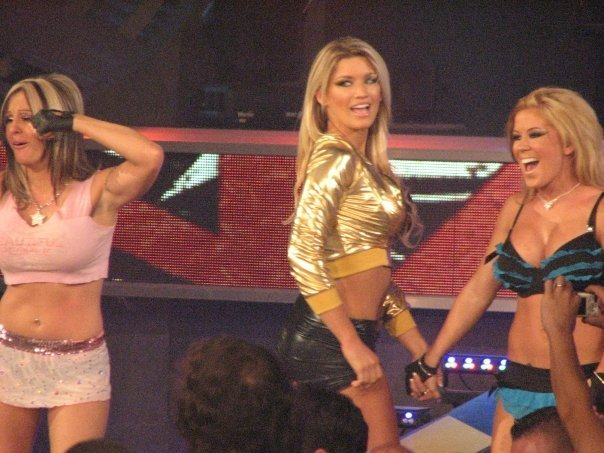
Angelina Love, Velvet Sky, Cute Kip, Madison Rayne, and Lacey Von Erich.

== History ==
=== Velvet-Love Entertainment (2007–2008) ===
Angelina Love and Velvet Sky made their Total Nonstop Action Wrestling (TNA) debuts as fan favorites. At the Turning Point pay-per-view in 2007, Love and Sky were placed into a tag team named Velvet-Love Entertainment (although often shown in chyron and announced as simply Velvet Sky and Angelina Love). At Turning Point the newly formed tag team defeated O.D.B. and Roxxi Laveaux. In March, Roxxi had a premonition about their safety which they ignored and offered Roxxi a makeover to apologize. On the March 13 edition of Impact!, Roxxi resisted their attempt at a makeover, offending Love and Sky, causing them to react violently. Love and Sky retaliated against the resistance by using the makeover to hurt, rather than help Roxxi. During the attack they utilized their cosmetics to humiliate Roxxi by spraying her in the eyes with hairspray and smearing makeup all over her face, thus becoming villains.

=== The Beautiful People ===
==== Makeovers (2008–2009) ====
Adopting the personas of superficial prima donnas, who loathe and insult anyone they consider to be physically unattractive, they dropped the Velvet-Love Entertainment moniker and became The Beautiful People. In 2008 at Lockdown, they participated in the first ever "Queen of the Cage" match, which was won by Roxxi, when she defeated Love in the finals. The following month's pay-per-view, Sacrifice, saw a Battle Royal where the last two in the ring competed in a Ladder match with the loser having their head shaved; the week before on Impact! Gail Kim won immunity in a Shears-On-A-Pole-Match. The Makeover Battle Royal-Ladder Match saw Kim and Roxxi survive the Battle Royal and with Kim having immunity this meant the third runner-up, Angelina Love, would have her head shaved if Roxxi won. Knowing this, Love interfered in the Ladder Match to ensure Kim's victory and Roxxi's head being shaved bald. While the Knockouts watched the haircut in pity, Love and Sky paraded around celebrating with Roxxi's freshly shaved hair cementing them as villains in one of TNA's most controversial moments.

The Beautiful People continued to harass the fan favorite Knockouts, including ruining Kim's chance at winning the TNA Women's Knockout Championship, injuring her, and unsuccessfully attempting to shave ODB's head after a match. This led to a Street Fight on June 5 between Sky and ODB, during which Mickie Knuckles (later renamed Moose) debuted as The Beautiful People's ally on Impact!. At Slammiversary the new trio lost in a six-woman tag team match against Roxxi, ODB and Kim when ODB pinned Moose.

On July 18, Sky won a ten-Knockout Battle Royal to earn a shot at the Knockouts Championship. However, she failed to win the match, afterwards her and Love assaulted champion Taylor Wilde, putting a paper bag over her head. Their bad luck continued when The Beautiful People main evented the July 31 Impact! in a losing effort to Wilde and Kim.

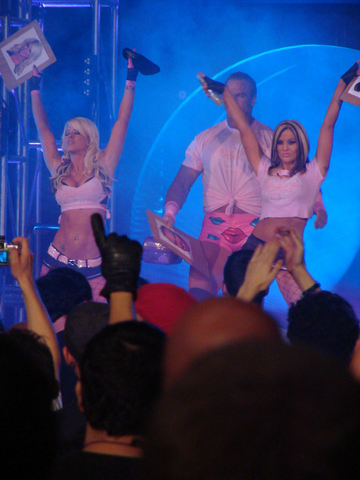
The Beautiful People holding paper bags, hair spray, and a makeup box

On the August 14 episode of Impact!, Kip James was introduced as the team's "fashionist" and male equivalent under the name Cute Kip. At times he would bring with him a tin like makeup box, that was also used as a weapon. As Sky had failed to win the title from Wilde, Love was given a chance at No Surrender. The following week on Impact!, The Beautiful People tried to intimidate Wilde before No Surrender, by attacking her backstage. Love and Wilde competed in a beauty pageant which Love lost after losing the evening gown and talent contest segments. Love also lost the title match at No Surrender. While Sky and Love had been focusing on Wilde and her title, Kip had begun a feud with Rhino. This feud ended in defeat for the Beautiful People, with them losing to ODB, Rhaka Khan and Rhino at Bound for Glory IV. Their feud with ODB spilled out into an alliance with Booker T who hired The Beautiful People to protect his wife, Sharmell, from ODB in exchange for his locker room on the December 4 episode of Impact!. This resulted in a six-woman tag team match at Final Resolution against ODB, Wilde and Roxxi, which they lost.

Also in December it was announced on TNA's website that the company had extended an invitation to United States Vice-Presidential candidate Sarah Palin which The Beautiful People looked forward to as they considered her husband to be attractive. A Governor Palin parody character, often referred to simply as The Governor, appeared on December 4 played by Shannon Spruill. Love and Sky were oblivious to The Governor being an imposter, resulting in some comedy skits where Kip tried to convince them they were being fooled while others mocked their stupidity. The Governor, meanwhile, convinced the duo that they would have a makeover that would make them worthy of her cabinet; the makeover involved frumpy clothes, no make-up and unstyled hair. On January 15, Taylor Wilde and Roxxi revealed that it had all been a ruse to humiliate The Beautiful People who, in Wilde's opinion, were making a mockery of TNA's women's division. After this they had mud dropped on them from the ceiling. The following week, The Beautiful People brutally attacked Spruill backstage until Kip stopped them after a sufficient beating. On February 5, The Beautiful People exacted revenge on Roxxi and Wilde in a tag match and put paper bags over their heads; however, their revenge was cut short when The Governor made the save.

==== Mi Pi Sexy (Mi∇⦵) (2009) ====
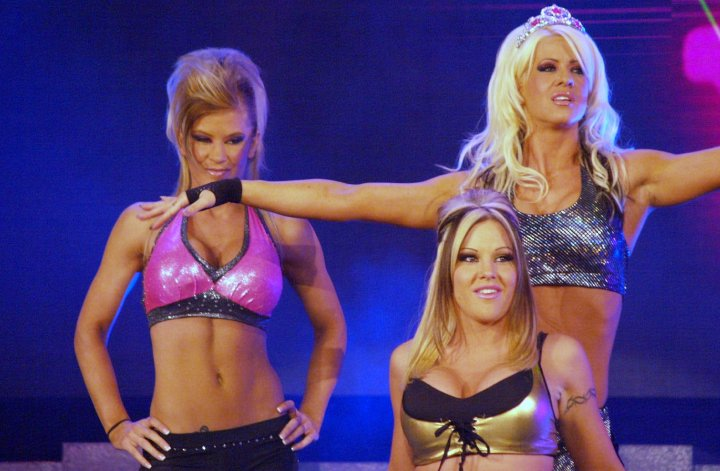
Madison Rayne (left) joined in March 2009 to make the sorority Mi∇⦵

Wilde's rivalry with The Beautiful People continued when she teamed with the recently debuted Knockout Madison Rayne on February 26. Rayne turned on Wilde in the tag team match giving The Beautiful People the win. With Rayne's help, The Beautiful People won a Four Corners Tag Team match against Awesome Kong and Raisha Saeed, Rhaka Khan and Sojourner Bolt, and Wilde and Roxxi. On the March 12 edition of Impact!, Madison Rayne was formally revealed as an initiate to Mi Pi Sexy (Mi∇⦵) (the newly formed sorority of the group). However, Rayne lost her initiation match to Taylor Wilde. Love and Sky continued to be referred to as "The Beautiful People", but when Rayne accompanied them, they were referred to as "Mi Pi Sexy". Some time later, the term "Mi Pi Sexy" became a nickname, thus being used occasionally on television.

The Beautiful People began hazing of Madison Rayne on March 19's Impact, which began with her helping them clip The Governor's hair after Rayne lost her match. Mi Pi Sexy would fight against Wilde, Roxxi, and The Governor at Destination X. Despite the numbers being even with the acquisition of Rayne, The Beautiful People failed to defeat their opponents. Monty Sopp, who played Cute Kip, was removed from television prior to Destination X to become a road agent, meaning his departure from the stable. This was explained on-screen by Sky, who stated that Kip was on probation before declaring he would be spoken about no more.

Rayne's hazing continued after The Beautiful People won an Impact! tag team match against Kong and Saeed, after which Rayne tried to cut the braided hair of the Knockout Champion Kong. With Sky in her corner, Angelina Love faced Kong and perennial nemesis Taylor Wilde in a three-way cage match for the Knockout Championship at Lockdown. Love narrowly escaped a somersault leg drop from Kong, and as she was recovering Love pushed her towards the cage while Sky pulled her frayed hair through the holes in the cage and tied her to it. With Kong unable to move from the cage, Wilde dove onto Love with a cross body press and legitimately knocked her unconscious with her knee. As she recovered, Wilde attacked Kong, allowing Love to roll-up Wilde for the pin and win the Knockout Championship. The following week on Impact!, Mi Pi Sexy had a celebration with male dancers and named Madison Rayne an official member of the Beautiful People. However the celebration was cut short by Kong. Kong continued her attack on Mi Pi Sexy and proved her dominance by making her way through Rayne, Sky and Kip, who Love brought back to stop her, in stretcher matches on the following weeks of Impact!. Despite this, at Sacrifice, Love retained her title against Kong.

On May 28, Love defended her title again against Sojourner Bolt with all of her associates at ringside. After quickly defeating Bolt, Love questioned why Cute Kip was still appearing with them and officially fired him from the group. After this Love made a speech about the dominance of The Beautiful People and mocked the lack of competition in TNA. This led to the debut of Tara who laid out both Sky and Rayne and used her Widow's Peak finisher on Love, before accepting the challenge. At Slammiversary, Tara had her chance at the title but with the help of some hairspray from Sky and Rayne, Love retained the championship. Tara, whose name alludes to the tarantula spider, began taunting the group with a tarantula over the next few weeks on Impact!, which resulted in Sky voicing her frustration about Love leaving her alone with the tarantula and threatening to leave the group, if Love didn't back her up.

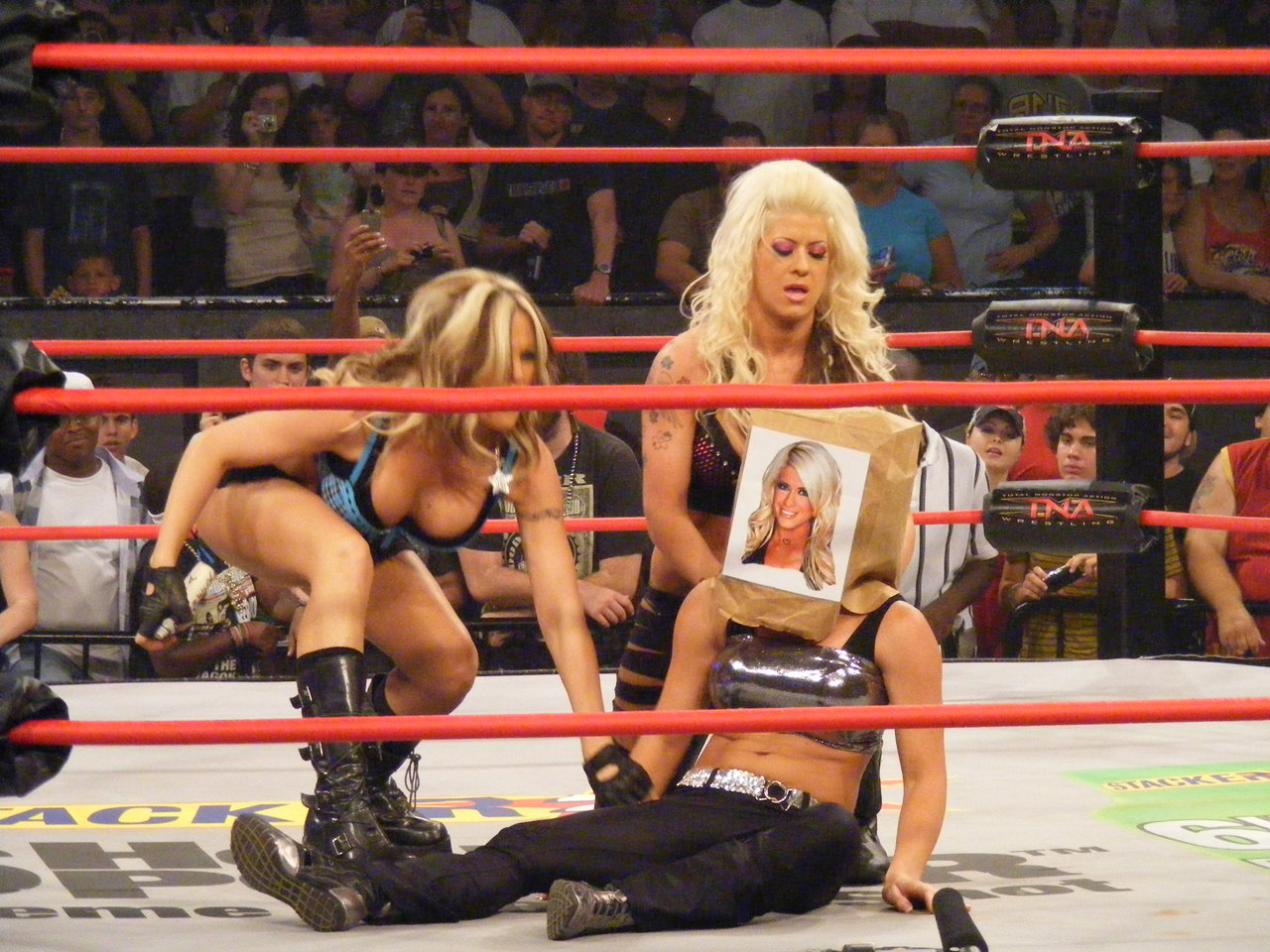
Rayne was paper bagged after being evicted

Consequently, when Tara defeated Sky and threatened to place a tarantula on her, Love agreed to put her Knockout Championship on the line immediately afterwards, and without Rayne for support, Love lost the championship. The following week Love demanded, and gained a rematch but was laid out with the Widow's Peak from Tara. At Victory Road, Love almost lost her match when she was accidentally blinded with hairspray, but kicked out and later pinned Tara despite her foot being under the bottom rope, to win back the Knockout Championship. Later in the evening the referee was seen leaving Rayne's shower, with the implication she had seduced him to officiate the match in Love's favour.

After all three failed to win a Battle Royal to become a member of Main Event Mafia, the group were seen mocking ODB and her associate Cody Deaner. A six-woman tag team match between all of Mi Pi Sexy against Tara, Kong and ODB turned into a three-on-one handicap match when Tara and Kong began to brawl between themselves. After a kiss from Deaner at ringside, Love was stunned and lost the match. It was later announced that at Hard Justice, the Knockout Championship would be on the line in a tag team contest between The Beautiful People against ODB and Deaner. After more mistimed hairspraying from Rayne, ODB won the title by virtue of Deaner pinning Sky. On the August 20 edition of Impact!, Madison Rayne was kicked out of Mi Pi Sexy for costing Love the title, being assaulted and paper bagged by them.

==== The Meanest Girls (2009–2010) ====
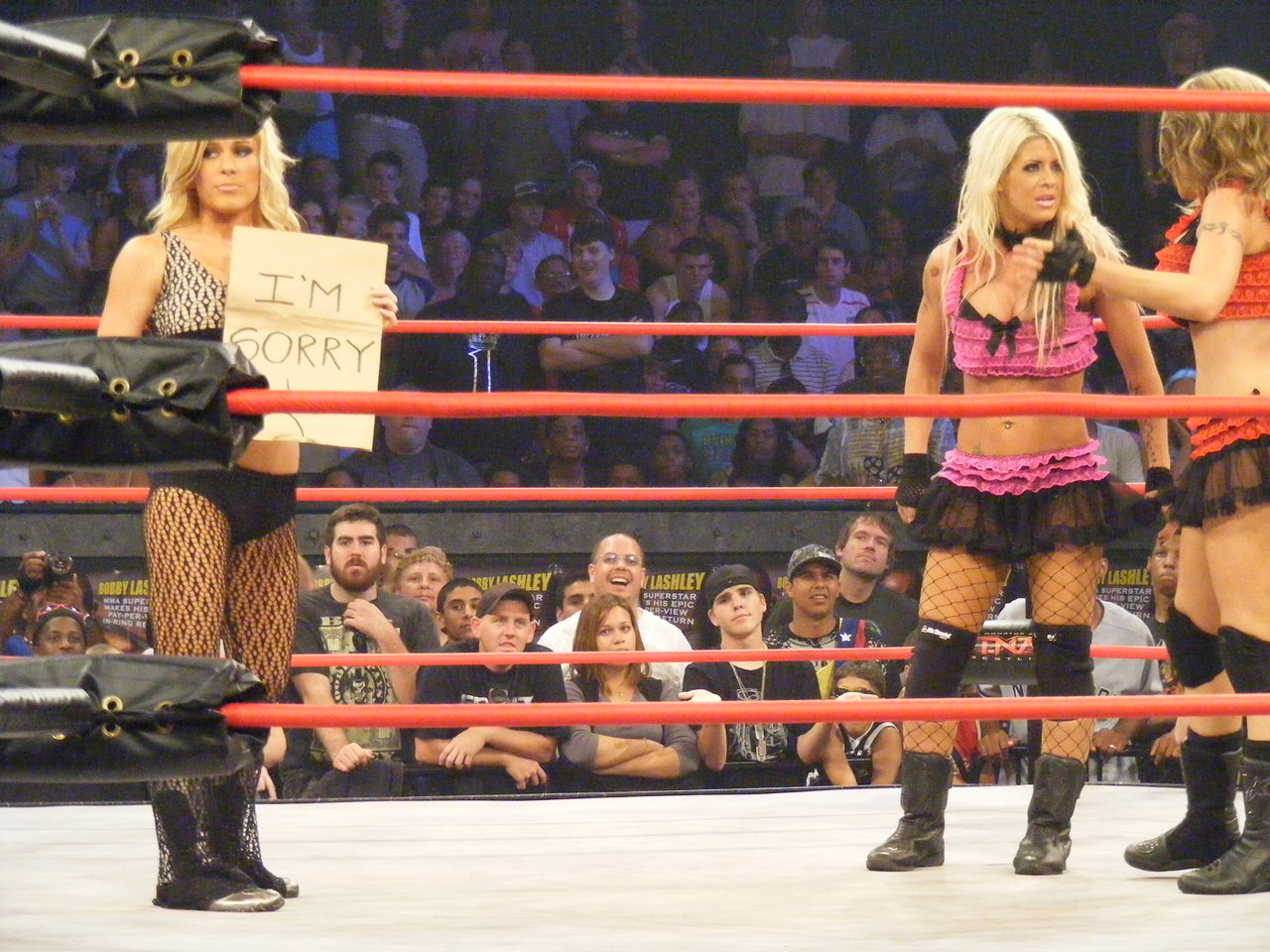
Rayne's apology was written on a brown paper bag

On September 3, Love — a Canadian national — was released from her contract with TNA due to problems with her visa. She, however, appeared on two more weeks of Impact! due to tapings being held before her release. During these episodes, Love and Sky took part in the tournament to crown the inaugural Knockouts Tag Team Champions. The Beautiful People defeated Madison Rayne and the returning Roxxi in the first round. The following week they defeated the team of Tara and Christy Hemme to advance to the finals of the tournament, after Hemme was hair sprayed in the eyes by Rayne. After the match Rayne joined Love and Sky in the ring and extended an apology to them, written on her brown paper bag. They accepted Rayne's apology and hugged in the ring. At No Surrender, the announcers explained Love's departure due to "business issues." Rayne replaced Love and teamed with Sky in the tournament finals where they lost their championship match to the team of Sarita and Taylor Wilde.

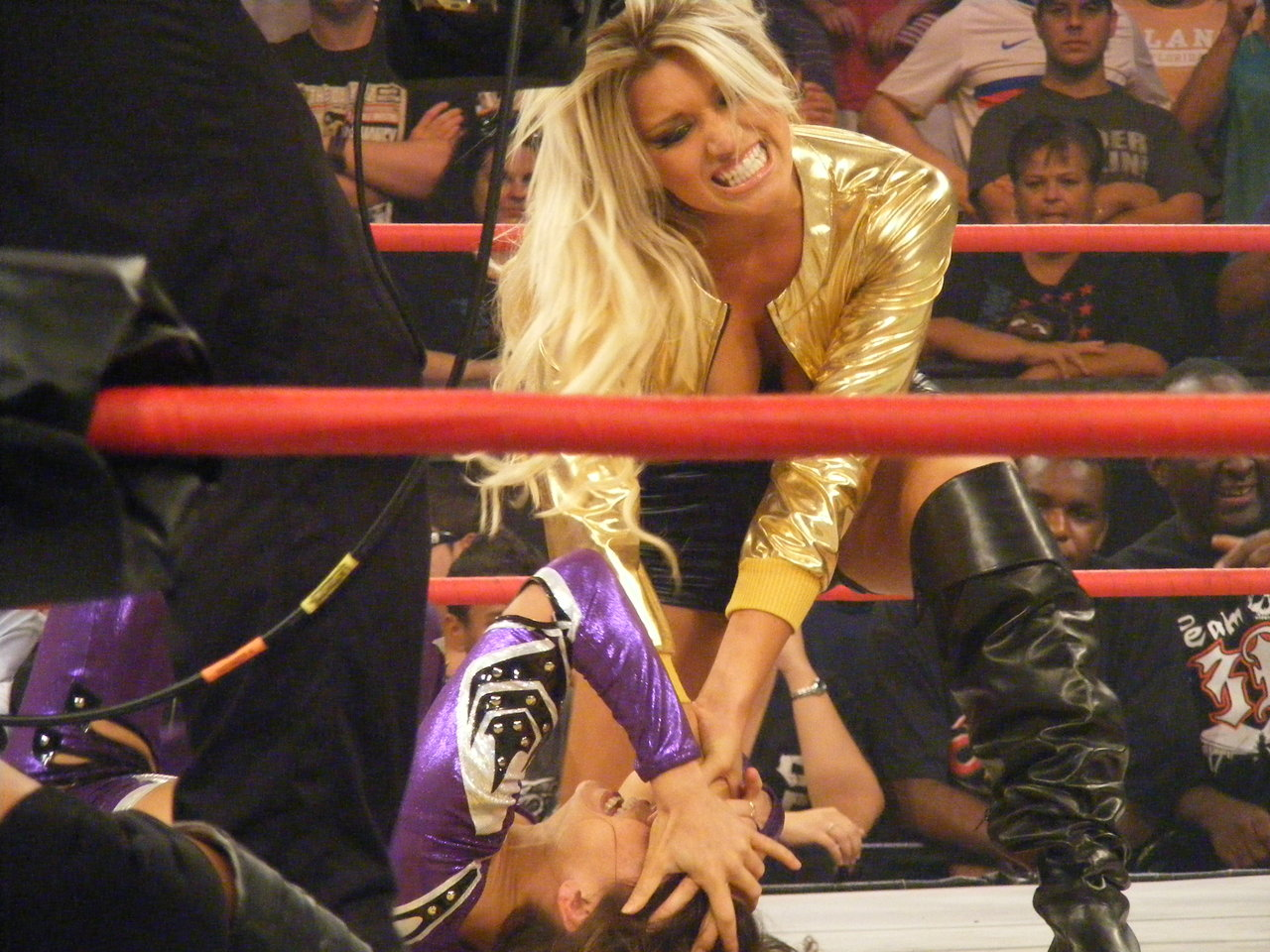
The debut of Lacey Von Erich

On the October 1 episode of Impact!, The Beautiful People apologized to the TNA fans and Knockouts for their behavior, blaming their past actions on Love. They invited the Knockouts Tag Team Champions, Wilde and Sarita, down to the ring to prove their apology was genuine and expressed their desire for a competitive match at Bound for Glory. The Beautiful People shook their hands, but then attacked them. As they began to lose the advantage in the assault, Lacey Von Erich debuted and took out Wilde and Sarita. The three then posed in the ring, welcoming Von Erich into The Beautiful People. The three then won their first match as a team, defeating ODB, Tara and Kong, but lost their Tag Team title rematch at Bound For Glory. On the October 22 episode of Impact!, The Beautiful People began appearing in backstage segments they dubbed as their reality show "The Meanest Girls", an allusion to the 2004 teen comedy Mean Girls. In the pilot episode, The Beautiful People attacked Wilde and Sarita at catering, and engaged in a food fight with The Beautiful People coming out on top. In the sequel, which aired on the November 5 edition of Impact!, the Beautiful People attacked ODB, setting up a six knockout tag team match at Turning Point for both the Women's Knockout Championship and the Knockouts Tag Team Championship. At the Pay-Per-View the Beautiful People were unsuccessful, as ODB pinned Rayne to win the match for the reigning champions. Around this time they also began using a new weapon named Lacey's Ugly Stick, a pink baton used to attack opponents.

Going into 2010, the group were met with a familiar face on the January 14 edition of Impact! when Angelina Love made her return, observing Sky and Rayne in a tag team match from the crowd. After the match, Love attacked Sky and Von Erich, telling Sky it was a mistake to replace her. On the March 8 Monday night edition of Impact! Rayne and Sky defeated the teams of Love and Tara and Sarita and Wilde in a three-way match to win the vacant TNA Knockouts Tag Team Championship, after interference from Daffney. The three members of the Beautiful People then defended the title under the Freebird rule. At Lockdown Rayne pinned Tara in a tag team steel cage match, where she teamed with Velvet Sky against Tara and TNA Women's Knockout Champion Angelina Love, to win Love's title and become the first person to hold both Knockout Championships simultaneously. At Sacrifice Rayne successfully defended the TNA Women's Knockout Championship against Tara in a Title vs. Career match, ending her TNA career in the process. Rayne once again successfully defended the Knockout Championship against Roxxi at Slammiversary VIII, ending another TNA career in the process.

==== Implosion (2010) ====
After returning from an injury in June, former member Angelina Love set her sights on the Beautiful People and regaining the Women's Knockout Championship from Rayne. Three weeks before Victory Road, Love was defeated by Von Erich via disqualification when she dropped Von Erich with a DDT on a steel chair. The following week in a match featuring Love and Sky, Sky suffered the same fate. Following this match, Love stared at Sky and said, "One more", meaning that she just had Rayne left to deal with. On July 11 at Victory Road, Rayne lost the Women's Knockout Championship to Angelina Love via disqualification due to outside interference from a masked villainess in a motorcycle helmet. Prior to the match it was announced that the title would change hands via disqualification, if either Velvet Sky or Lacey Von Erich interfered in the match. On the following edition of Impact!, The Beautiful People imploded as Sky said she didn't approve of Rayne's recent attitude, behavior, and apparent affiliation with the mystery woman at the pay-per-view, to which Rayne responded by saying that she didn't need Sky anymore. Sky then walked out on Rayne as she and the mystery woman ganged up on Love. On the July 22 edition of Impact!, the Women's Knockout Championship was returned to Rayne, when it was declared that there was no proof that the person who had interfered in the match was either Sky or Von Erich.

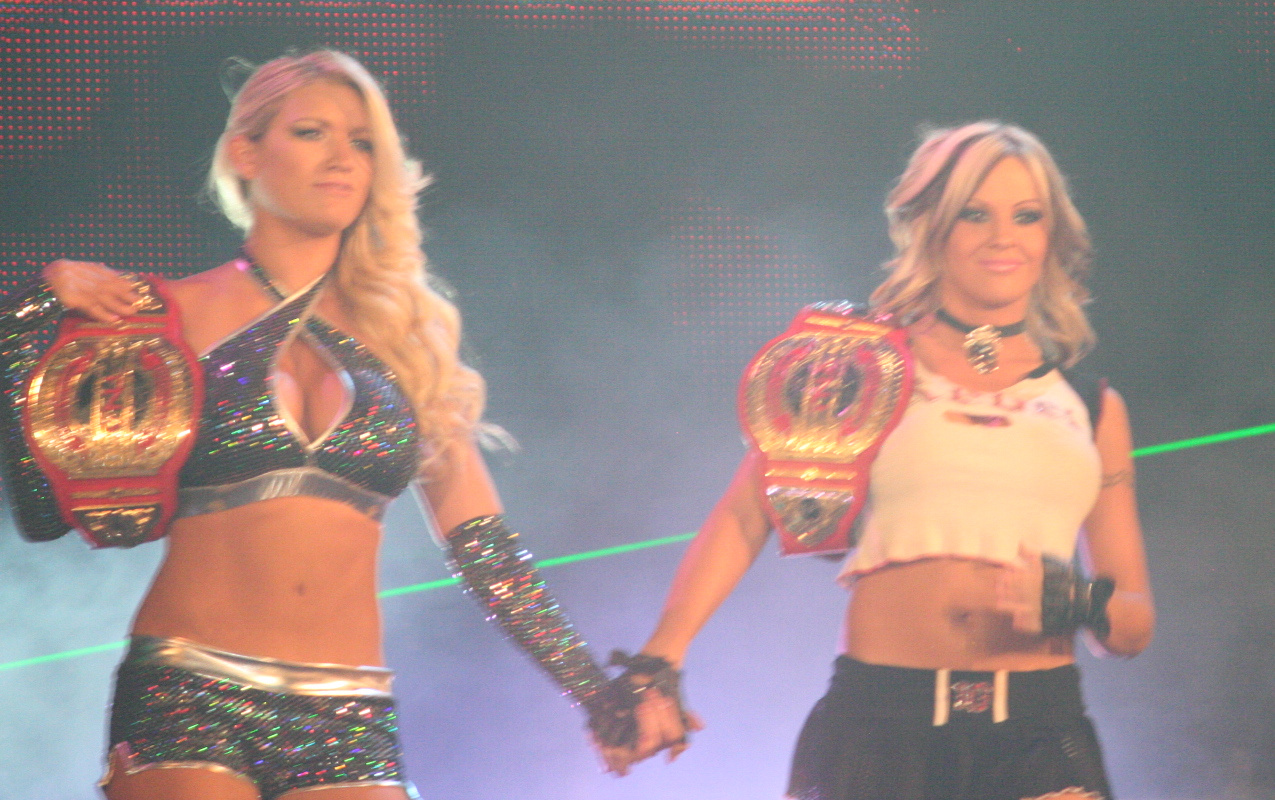
Von Erich and Velvet Sky making their entrance in July 2010

On the July 29 edition of Impact! Rayne apologized to Sky and the three Beautiful People agreed to a truce. However, on the following edition of Impact!, Sky and Von Erich lost the TNA Knockouts Tag Team Championship to Hamada and Taylor Wilde, when Rayne and the mystery woman's interference backfired. Later in the night, Sky and Rayne were seen fighting backstage, during which Sky vented her frustrations to Rayne, proclaiming their truce and friendship over and then shoved Von Erich, who tried to make peace between her teammates, inadvertently knocking her unconscious. The following week Rayne lost the Women's Knockout Championship to Love. During the match the mystery woman tried to distract Love; however, Velvet Sky stopped her. Love countered the Rayne Drop and executed the Lights Out for the victory. On the August 19 episode of Impact!, Sky reunited with Angelina Love, accompanying her to the ring and helping her successfully defend the Women's Knockout Championship against Rayne, who was with the mysterious biker woman. After the match, Sky and Love were beaten down by Rayne and the mystery woman, who later unmasked and revealed herself as Tara. That night, Tara and Rayne defeated the reunited Beautiful People in a tag match when Tara hit Sky with the motorcycle helmet.

==== Storyline with Winter (2010–2011) ====
The following week, Love and Sky were featured on Impact! and were announced as The Beautiful People, whilst using the stable's signature entrance music, clarifying that the stable now consists of its original members and for the first time since 2007, is a face group. Rayne's mysterious ally was finally unmasked as Tara on the September 2 edition of Impact!, when the two of them defeated the Beautiful People in their first match together in a year. At No Surrender Sky defeated her former Beautiful People partner Rayne in a singles match. On the September 16 edition of Impact! Love and Sky saved Lacey Von Erich, who was making a return from her injury, from a beating at the hands of Rayne and Tara and accepted her back into The Beautiful People. During the feud Rayne had claimed to own the rights to the name the Beautiful People, but on the October 7 live edition of Impact!, Love and Sky defeated her and Tara in a tag team match to officially earn the right to call themselves the Beautiful People. At Bound for Glory Love lost the Women's Knockout Championship to Tara in a Four Corners match, which also included Velvet Sky and Madison Rayne and was refereed by Mickie James. On November 11, Lacey Von Erich announced that she had left TNA earlier that day. On the December 9 edition of Impact! Love and Sky entered a four–team tournament for the vacated Knockouts Tag Team Championship and defeated Sarita and Daffney in their first round match. Two weeks later, Sarita attacked Sky and took her out of the final match, which led to Winter, who had been stalking Love for the past months, replacing her and teaming with Love to defeat Madison Rayne and Tara for the Knockouts Tag Team Championship. On March 13, 2011, at Victory Road, Sky, who had grown jealous of Winter's relationship with Love, inadvertently cost them the Knockouts Tag Team Championship in a match against Sarita and Rosita. Love began turning heel on the March 24 edition of Impact!, when Winter, seemingly having control over Love's actions, prevented Love from saving Sky from a beatdown at the hands of Sarita and Rosita. On the April 7 edition of Impact!, Love, still under Winter's spell, attacked Sky during a Knockouts Tag Team Championship match against Sarita and Rosita and left her to be pinned by the champions. cementing Love's heel turn. On the April 28 edition of Impact!, the villainous Love defeated Sky via submission in a singles match, no-selling all of her opponent's offense during the match. The following week, Sky declared the Beautiful People dead and announced her intention of going for the TNA Women's Knockout Championship.

==== Independent circuit (2011–2012) ====
Love and Sky reunited for one night only on June 18, 2011, at Mexican promotion Lucha Libre AAA World Wide's (AAA) Triplemanía XIX pay-per-view, where they teamed with Mickie James and Sexy Star in an eight-woman tag team match, where they defeated Cynthia Moreno, Faby Apache, Mari Apache and Lolita.

After both Love's and Sky's departures from TNA, the two reunited as the Beautiful People on September 22, 2012, at a Northeast Wrestling event, where they were defeated by Madison Rayne and Rosita. The Beautiful People made their debut for Family Wrestling Entertainment (FWE) on October 4, 2012, at the Back 2 Brooklyn internet pay-per-view, where they defeated Maria Kanellis and Katrina Lea.

==== Reunion and various feuds (2014) ====
Velvet Sky and Madison Rayne reunited as "The Beautiful People" for one night on the January 30, 2014, episode of Impact Wrestling, defeating Gail Kim and Lei'D Tapa in a tag team match. On the February 27 episode of Impact Wrestling, The Beautiful People were reunited again in a tag team match against Tapa and Alpha Female, which they would lose when Tapa pinned Rayne due to interference from Chris Sabin and Kim.

On the March 13 episode of Impact Wrestling, Angelina Love returned to TNA and called out Sky, wanting to reunite the team, and a week later on Impact Wrestling, Sky would accept Love's offer, while Rayne would decline. Love would later attack Rayne backstage, which would lead to a match between the two on the following week. Love defeated Rayne in her return match after Sky turned on Rayne and attacked her, which turned Sky villainous. After the match, Love and Sky would pose and laugh at Rayne, officially reuniting the original heel incarnation. The Beautiful People made their in-ring return the following week on Impact Wrestling as villains, defeating Rayne and Brittany after Love pinned Brittany following the Makeover. On the April 10 episode of Impact Wrestling, Love defeated ODB, Gail Kim and Brittany in a fatal four-way match to become the number one contender to Rayne's Women's Knockout Championship. On the April 24 episode of Impact Wrestling, The Beautiful People would once again defeat Rayne in a tag team match, only this time with Gail Kim as her partner. At Sacrifice, Love defeated Rayne to become a sixth time Knockouts Champion. Few weeks later, Sky lost two matches to Gail Kim on Impact Wrestling and Xplosion. At Slammiversary, Love successfully defended her title against Kim. On June 20, during the tapings of the July 3 episode of Impact Wrestling, Love lost the Knockout's title to Kim, ending her reign at only 54 days. On the September 10 episode of Impact Wrestling, Sky was announced that she is the winner of the 2015 Knockouts Calendar, after the celebration, The Beautiful People shoved Brittany right into a chokeslam from Havok. The Beautiful People defeated Madison Rayne and Taryn Terrell in a tag team match on the October 29 edition of Impact Wrestling, with the win coming after Rayne turned villainous and attacked Terrell, allowing Love and Sky to pin her.

In late 2014, The Beautiful People formed an alliance with The BroMans and regularly teamed with them. On the January 23, 2015, episode of Impact Wrestling, Velvet Sky retrieved a briefcase for Robbie E during the Feast or Fired match. The briefcase contained the "pink" slip and Sky was fired, effectively disbanding The Beautiful People in the process. Love later separated from The BroMans after they disbanded in April 2015.

==== Feud with The Dollhouse (2015–2016) ====
On the May 8 episode of Impact Wrestling, Velvet Sky returned to TNA and attacked Love. On the June 3 episode of Impact Wrestling, Love got Sky arrested by her security staff after she attacked Madison Rayne, while Love was arrested herself by event staff as Sky appeared as a fan, and was arrested for fan assault. This led to a match between the two, which occurred on June 24, in which Velvet Sky won to get her spot back in the company.

On the September 2 episode of Impact Wrestling, Love and Rayne turned face and saved Sky after being attacked by The Dollhouse (Jade, Marti Bell and Rebel). The following week, Sky and Rayne went up against The Dollhouse in a losing battle after Rebel distracted Rayne and threw powder in her face. On the January 5 tapings, Sky and Rayne would team up with Gail Kim to defeat The Dollhouse only after being attacked by Awesome Kong and The Dollhouse.

On the March 27, 2016, Love announced her Twitter account that her contract with TNA had expired during the pregnancy. On the April 22, 2016, Sky left the company, leaving Rayne as the final active member of the group in TNA. However, Love returned to the company in January 2017, before both Rayne and Love left the company in the summer of that year.

==== Returns (2023) ====
In August 2023, Impact Wrestling announced that The Beautiful People would return for the promotion's historic 1,000th episode of Impact!. On the September 14, 2023 episode of Impact! (which was taped on September 9), Angelina Love and Velvet Sky made their first appearance for the company in seven years. They opened the milestone show with a signature entrance alongside other notable Knockouts alumni. Later that night, Angelina Love competed in a 10-woman tag team match, teaming with Deonna Purrazzo, Gisele Shaw, Savannah Evans, and Tasha Steelz against Awesome Kong, Gail Kim, Jordynne Grace, Mickie James, and Trinity. Velvet Sky, who had previously retired from in-ring competition, accompanied Love and her team to ringside as their manager. Love's team was defeated after Awesome Kong pinned Shaw.

== Members ==
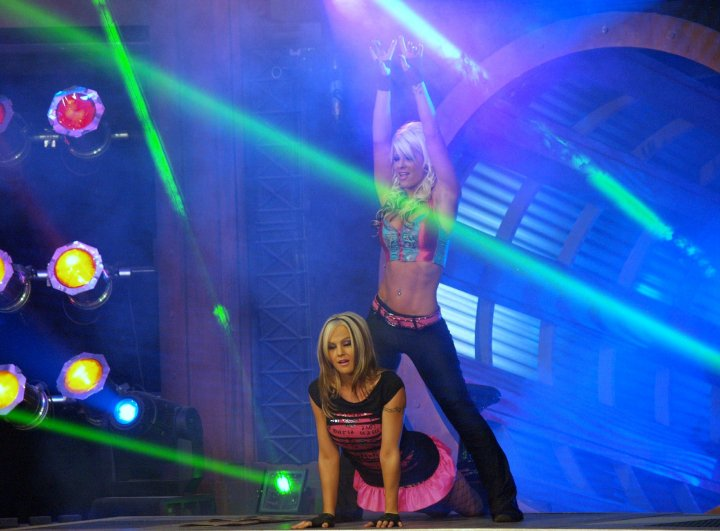
Original members Angelina Love and Velvet Sky

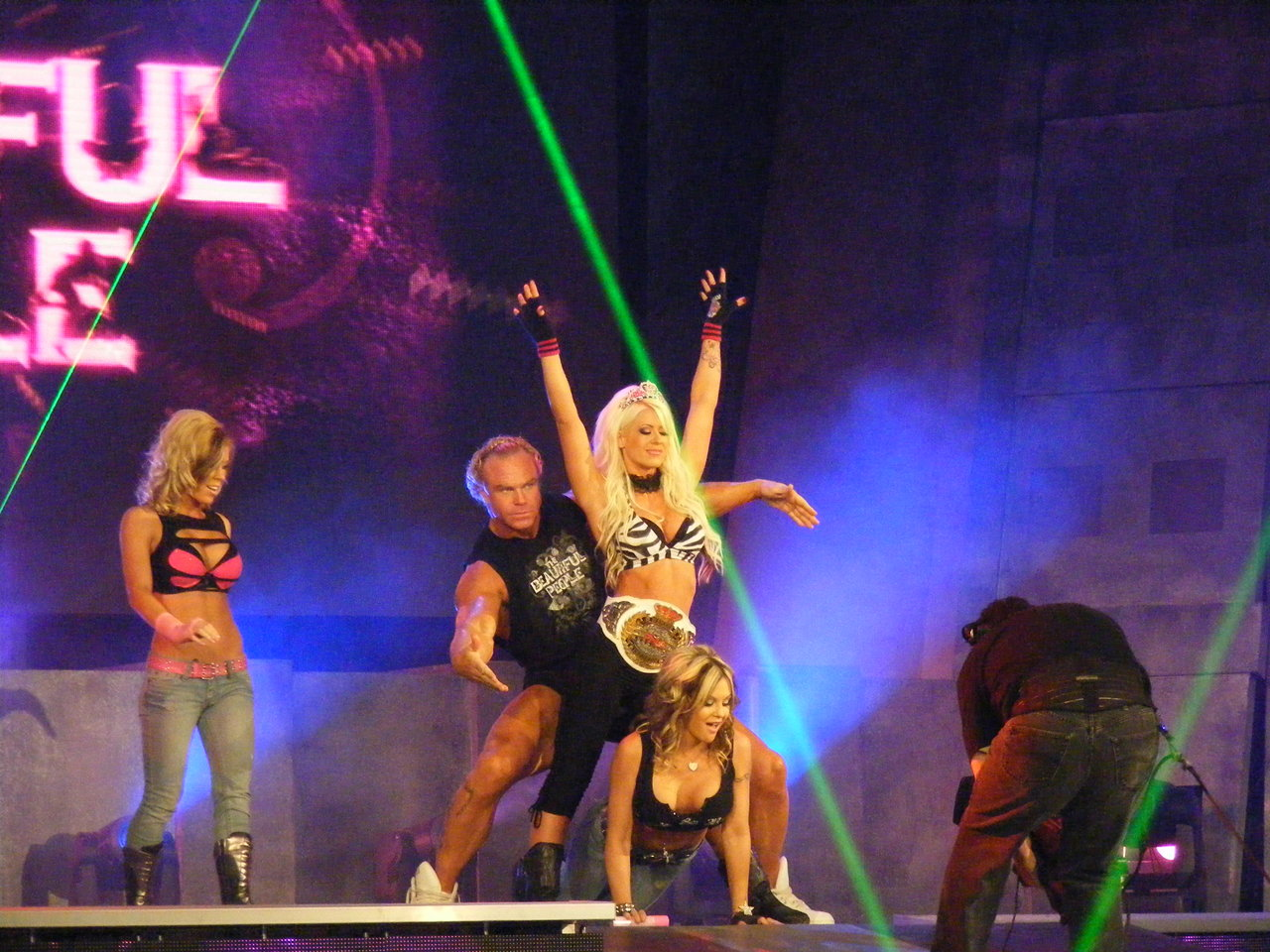
Angelina Love, Velvet Sky, Cute Kip and Madison Rayne as The Beautiful People

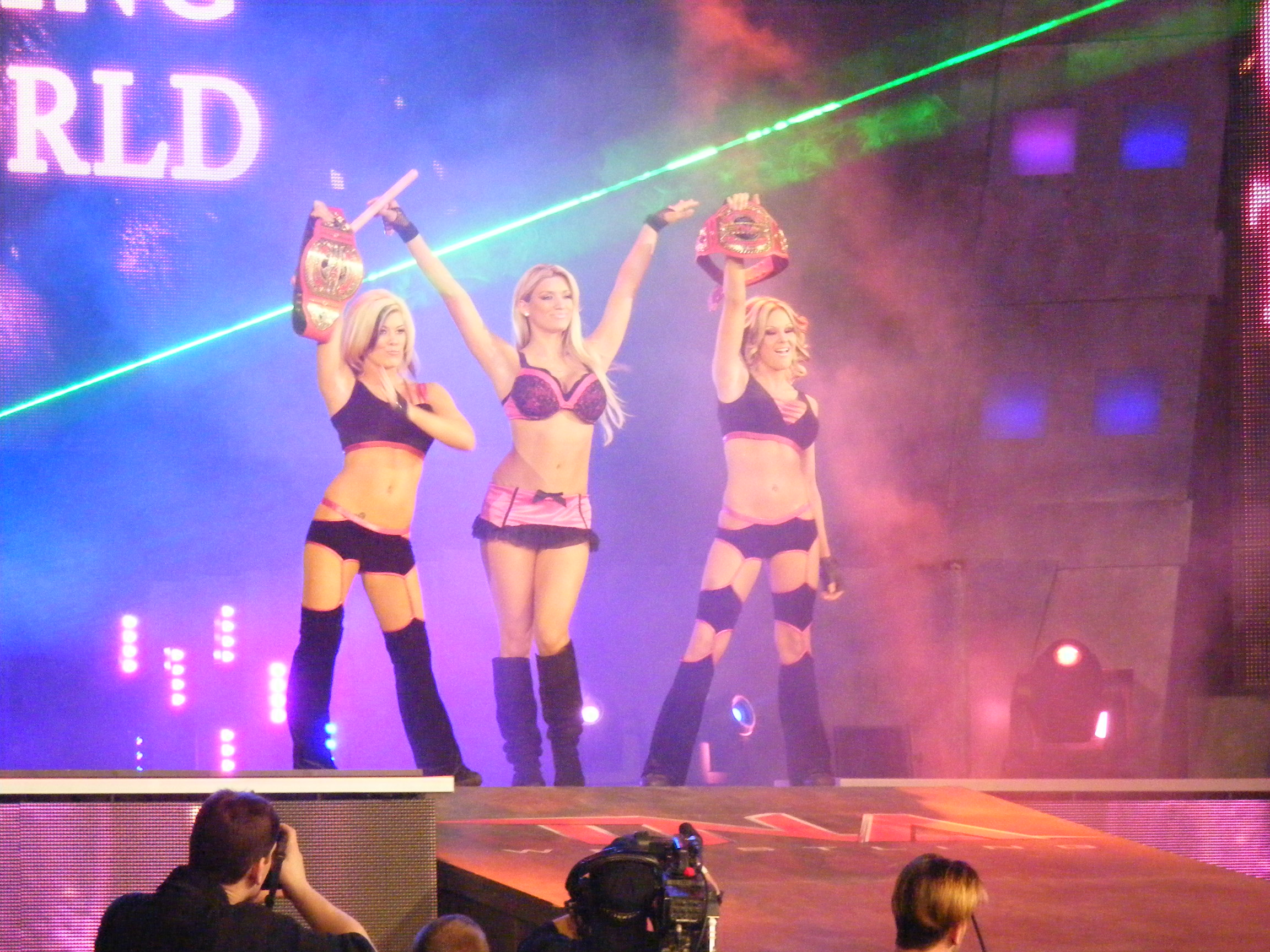
From left to right: Madison Rayne, Lacey Von Erich and Velvet Sky

- Angelina Love:
  - December 2, 2007 — September 20, 2009
  - August 19, 2010 — April 7, 2011
  - March 20, 2014 — January 23, 2015
  - September 2, 2015 — March 27, 2016
- Velvet Sky:
  - December 2, 2007 — April 7, 2011
  - January 30, 2014 — January 23, 2015
  - September 2, 2015 — April 22, 2016
- Cute Kip:
  - August 14, 2008 — May 28, 2009
- Madison Rayne:
  - March 12, 2009 — August 16, 2009
  - September 17, 2009 — August 5, 2010
  - January 30, 2014 — March 20, 2014
  - September 2, 2015 — April 22, 2016
- Lacey Von Erich:
  - October 1, 2009 — August 5, 2010
  - September 16, 2010 — November 11, 2010

== Championships and accomplishments ==
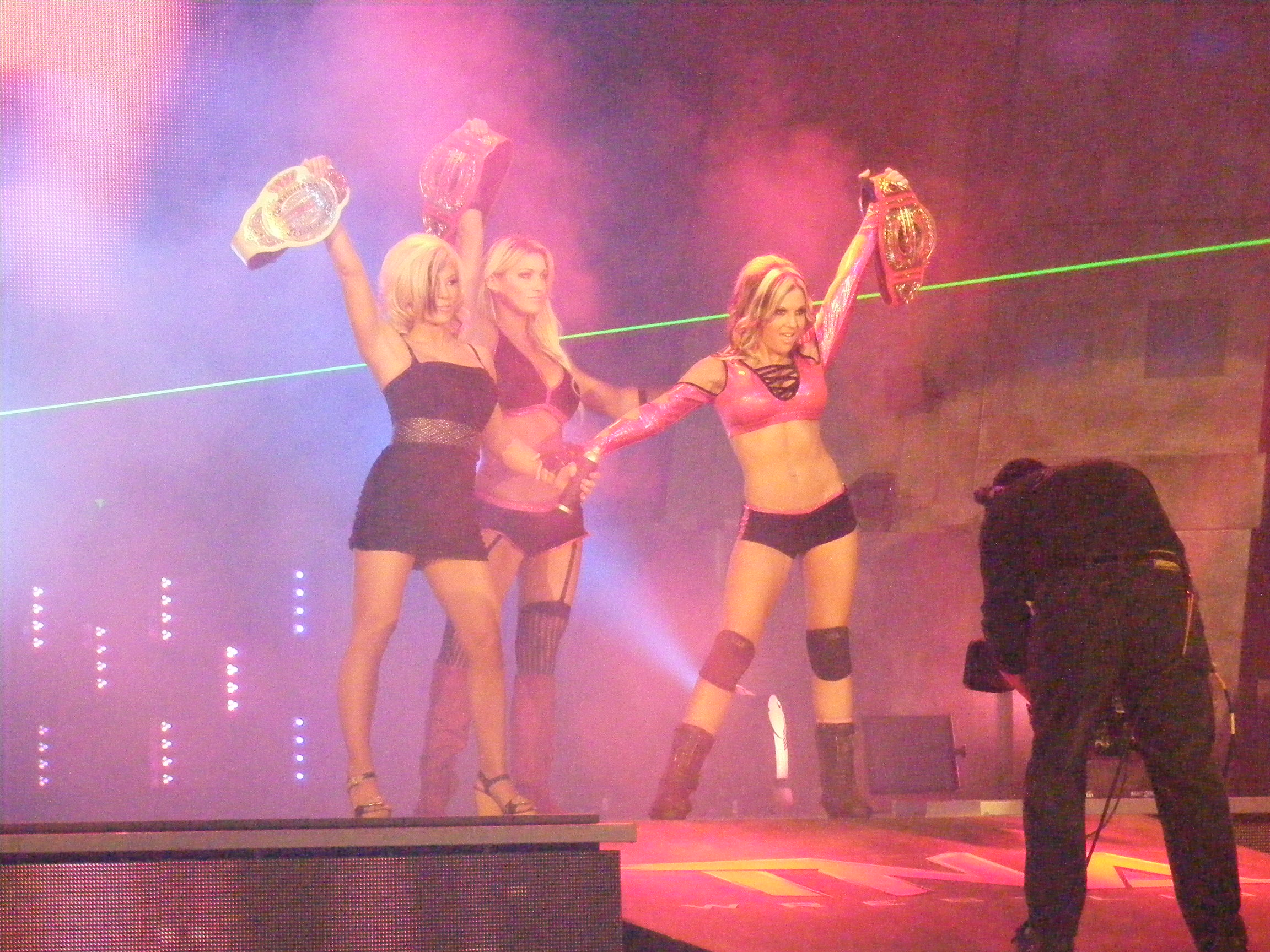
Von Erich (middle) and Sky (right) as the TNA Knockouts Tag Team Champions and Madison Rayne (left) as the TNA Knockouts Champion

- Pro Wrestling Illustrated
  - Love ranked No. 2 of the top 50 female wrestlers in the PWI Female Top 50 in 2009 and 2010
  - Rayne ranked No. 6 of the top 50 female wrestlers in the PWI Female Top 50 in 2010
  - Sky ranked No. 11 of the top 50 female wrestlers in the PWI Female Top 50 in 2013
- Total Nonstop Action Wrestling
  - TNA Knockouts Championship (6 times) – Love (4) and Rayne (2)
  - TNA Knockouts Tag Team Championship (2 times) – Rayne, Sky and Von Erich (1), (Note: Rayne, Sky and Von Erich defended the title under the Freebird Rule.) Love (with Winter) (1)
  - TNA Knockouts Tag Team Championship Tournament (2010) – with Angelina Love
  - Feast or Fired (2015 – Pink Slip) – Sky
  - TNA Hall of Fame (Class of 2025) - Love and Sky
