= Caged Collision =

2009 professional wrestling event

- Promotion: Ring of Honor
- Date: January 31, 2009 (taped); April 17, 2009 (aired)
- City: Chicago Ridge, Illinois
- Venue: Frontier Fieldhouse
- Attendance: 900

Pay-per-view chronology
| ← Previous; Rising Above | Next → Take No Prisoners |

Caged Collision was a professional wrestling pay-per-view (PPV) event produced by Ring of Honor (ROH). It took place on January 31, 2009, at the Frontier Fieldhouse in Chicago Ridge, Illinois, and aired on pay-per-view on April 17, 2009. Nine matches took place the event's card, with seven that aired on the broadcast.

== Production ==
=== Storylines ===
Other on-screen personnel
| Role | Name |
|---|---|
| Commentators | Dave Prazak |
| Commentators | Lenny Leonard |

Caged Collision featured storylines and nine different professional wrestling matches that involved different wrestlers from pre-existing scripted feuds and storylines. Storylines were produced on ROH's weekly television programme Ring of Honor Wrestling.

== Results ==
| No. | Results | Stipulations | Times |
|---|---|---|---|
| 1^{D} | The Ring Side Review (Gavin Star and Keith Creme) defeated Erin Scott and Andrew Ridgeway | Tag team match | 04:34 |
| 2^{D} | Egotistico Fantastico defeated Derrick St. Holmes | Singles match | 03:35 |
| 3 | Alex Payne defeated Kenny King and Silas Young | Three-way match | 07:11 |
| 4 | Claudio Castagnoli defeated Kevin Steen | Singles match | 09:05 |
| 5 | Grizzly Redwood defeated Rhett Titus | Singles match | 04:50 |
| 6 | Jerry Lynn and Necro Butcher defeated The Age of the Fall (Brodie Lee and Delirious) (with Jimmy Jacobs) | Tag team match | 11:39 |
| 7 | Tyler Black defeated Austin Aries, Bryan Danielson and Jimmy Jacobs | Four Corner Survival match for a future ROH World Championship match | 19:51 |
| 8 | Nigel McGuinness (c) defeated El Generico by submission | Singles match for the ROH World Championship | 17:06 |
| 9 | Ace Steel, Brent Albright, Erick Stevens, Jay Briscoe and Roderick Strong defeated Sweet & Sour Inc. (Adam Pearce, Bobby Dempsey, Davey Richards, Eddie Edwards and Tank Toland) (with Larry Sweeney) | Steel Cage Warfare | 17:24 |
(c) / – the champion(s) heading into the match; D / – this was a dark match

== See also ==
- 2009 in professional wrestling
- List of Ring of Honor pay-per-view events
