= No Surrender (2009) =

2009 Total Nonstop Action Wrestling pay-per-view event

- Promotional poster featuring Bobby Lashley
- Promotion: Total Nonstop Action Wrestling
- Date: September 20, 2009
- City: Orlando, Florida
- Venue: TNA Impact! Zone
- Attendance: 1,100

Pay-per-view chronology
← Previous; Hard Justice	Next → Bound for Glory

No Surrender chronology
← Previous; 2008	Next → 2010

The 2009 No Surrender was a professional wrestling pay-per-view (PPV) event produced by the Total Nonstop Action Wrestling (TNA) promotion, which took place on September 20, 2009 at the TNA Impact! Zone in Orlando, Florida. It was the fifth event under the No Surrender chronology.

Nine matches were contested at the event. In the main event, AJ Styles defeated Kurt Angle, Sting, Matt Morgan and Hernandez in a Five-Way Dance to win the TNA World Heavyweight Championship. In other prominent matches, Bobby Lashley defeated Rhino, Kevin Nash defeated Abyss in a $50,000 Bounty Challenge to retain the TNA Legends Championship, Samoa Joe defeated Daniels to retain the TNA X Division Championship, and Sarita and Taylor Wilde defeated The Beautiful People (Madison Rayne and Velvet Sky) to become the inaugural TNA Knockouts World Tag Team Champions.

== Storylines ==
Other on-screen personnel
Role:	Name:
Commentator	Mike Tenay
Commentator	Taz
Interviewer	Jeremy Borash
Interviewer	Lauren Thompson
Ring announcer	Jeremy Borash
Ring announcer	David Penzer
Referee	Earl Hebner
Referee	Rudy Charles
Referee	Mark Johnson
Referee	Andrew Thomas

No Surrender featured nine professional wrestling matches that involved different wrestlers from pre-existing scripted feuds and storylines. Wrestlers portrayed villains, heroes, or less distinguishable characters in the scripted events that built tension and culminated in a wrestling match or series of matches.

At Hard Justice, ODB and her manager Cody Deaner defeated The Beautiful People (Angelina Love and Velvet Sky) in a tag team match to claim Angelina Love's TNA Women's Knockout Championship. However, because he scored the pinfall on Velvet Sky to win the match, Deaner began to insist he was the "true" Knockout Champion instead of ODB (despite it being a women's title), going as far as to call himself the "King of the Knockouts". Amid this infighting, an intergender match was scheduled between ODB and Deaner for the Knockout Championship at No Surrender.

== Results ==
No.	Results	Stipulations	Times
1	Sarita and Taylor Wilde defeated The Beautiful People (Madison Rayne and Velvet Sky) by pinfall	Tag team match for the inaugural TNA Knockouts Tag Team Championship	04:55
2	Hernandez defeated Eric Young by pinfall	Singles match	00:48
3	Samoa Joe (c) defeated Daniels by submission	Singles match for the TNA X Division Championship	13:47
4	D'Angelo Dinero defeated Suicide by pinfall	Falls Count Anywhere match	12:14
5	ODB defeated Cody Deaner by pinfall	Singles match for the vacant TNA Women's Knockout Championship	07:14
6	Kevin Nash (c) defeated Abyss by pinfall	$50,000 Bounty Challenge for the TNA Legends Championship	08:23
7	Beer Money, Inc. (James Storm and Robert Roode) and Team 3D (Brother Devon and Brother Ray) defeated The Main Event Mafia (Booker T and Scott Steiner) and The British Invasion (Brutus Magnus and Doug Williams) by pinfall	Lethal Lockdown match	21:27
8	Bobby Lashley defeated Rhino	Singles match	07:04
9	A.J. Styles defeated Hernandez, Kurt Angle (c), Matt Morgan and Sting	Five-Way Dance for the TNA World Heavyweight Championship (This was Hernandez's Feast or Fired World Title match)	15:10
(c) / – the champion(s) heading into the match

== See also ==
- 2009 in professional wrestling
