= Sarah Stock =

Canadian professional wrestler (born 1979)

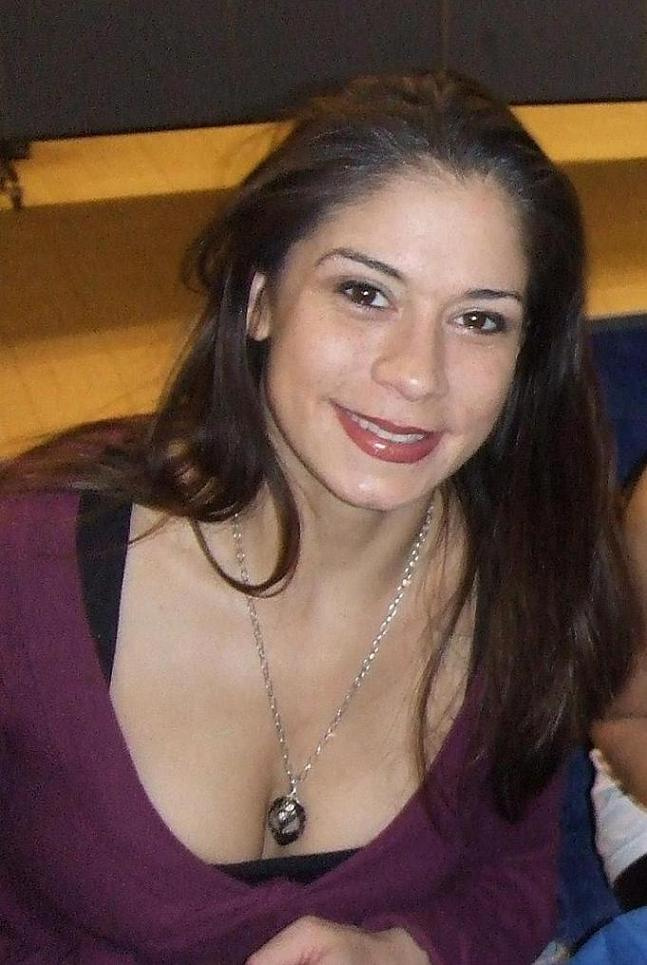
- Stock in 2010

Personal information
- Born: March 4, 1979 (age 47) Winnipeg, Manitoba, Canada
- Education: University of Manitoba

Professional wrestling career
- Ring name(s): Canadian Dark Angel; Dark Angel; Natasha Graves; Sarah Griffin; Sarah Stock; Sarah Swayze; Sarita; Sweet Sarah
- Billed height: 5 ft 5 in (1.65 m)
- Billed weight: 125 lb (57 kg)
- Billed from: Winnipeg, Manitoba, Canada; Mexico City, Mexico
- Trained by: Phil Lafon; Eddie Watts; Diluvio Negro I El Satánico
- Debut: February 22, 2002
- Retired: May 28, 2022

Sarah Stock (born March 4, 1979) is a Canadian professional wrestler. She is known for her role in All Elite Wrestling (AEW) and as a trainer and producer for WWE. Previously began her career in Canada and moved back and forth across the country, working for various promotions, facing both male and female wrestlers. She then moved to Mexico, where she worked under the ring name Dark Angel for Lucha Libre AAA World Wide (AAA) and later for Consejo Mundial de Lucha Libre (CMLL). She is also known for her time in Total Nonstop Action Wrestling (TNA), where under the ring name Sarita she became the inaugural and two-time TNA Knockouts Tag Team Champion, holding the title the first time with Taylor Wilde and the second time with Rosita. She has also worked in Japan for JDStar and World Wonder Ring Stardom, where she held the Wonder of Stardom Championship.

== Early and personal life ==
Stock was born in Winnipeg, Manitoba, and graduated from Winnipeg's St. John's-Ravenscourt School. She then attended the University of Manitoba, where she was an honors student and completed a Bachelor of Science degree with a major in chemistry. Stock is trilingual, with the ability to speak English, French, and Spanish, the latter of which she learned and practiced during her tenures in Mexico.

Stock practiced and competed in Muay Thai kickboxing for several years before entering professional wrestling. She has also participated in soccer, track and field, cross country running and horseback riding. Stock has stated that, if she had to pick a career outside of wrestling, she would consider the field of sports psychology and nutrition.

== Professional wrestling career ==
=== Early years (2002–2003) ===
Stock began training as a professional wrestler in Winnipeg, Manitoba's Top Rope Championship Wrestling. She trained for five weeks before an open spot on the company's tour gave her the opportunity to debut. She debuted on the Northwest Territories independent circuit on February 22, 2002. She wrestled for Can-Am Wrestling in early 2002 and was awarded the Can-Am Wrestling Women's Championship upon her debut in the promotion. That July, she joined Real Action Wrestling under the ring name Sweet Sarah, in the Canadian Maritimes as a valet to Johnny Wiseguy. Soon after, she began wrestling in the promotion, teaming with Wiseguy in a series of mixed tag team matches against Duke MacIsaac and his valet, Rachel. The promotion soon folded, but Stock signed with MainStream Wrestling (MSW) in Halifax, Nova Scotia, where she debuted in August 2002 and continued to wrestle as Sweet Sarah. There were few female wrestlers in the area, so she worked in several matches against male wrestlers.

The following month, Stock began wrestling for Afa Anoaʻi's World Xtreme Wrestling (WXW), based in Pennsylvania, United States. She worked against female wrestlers, including Mercedes Martinez and Valentina. In October, she returned to Canada and wrestled in Albertan independent promotions under the ring name Sarah Griffin. She engaged in a feud with Charlotte Webb, and the two faced each other in both Hybrid Wrestling Coalition and Can-Am Wrestling. Griffin was successful in the majority of these matches. From November 2002 to April 2003, she worked for several other Canadian independent promotions, including Extreme Canadian Championship Wrestling, Monster Pro Wrestling, and Premier Championship Wrestling. In April, she returned to MSW, where she feuded with male wrestler Kyle Kruze. This feud included matches with special stipulations, including a "Kiss My Ass" match which she won, and a Bra and Panties match.

=== LLF and AAA (2003–2004) ===
In 2003, in an effort to improve her in-ring skills, Stock relocated to Monterrey, Mexico to face the female wrestlers there. At the suggestion of a promoter, Stock began working while wearing a mask. She also took on the ring name Dark Angel, on the advice of Eddie Watts. She initially found it difficult to work with the wrestlers in Mexico, as she did not speak Spanish and could not communicate with them throughout the match. On October 17, she defeated Simply Luscious to win the Lucha Libre Femenil Juvenil Championship.

While wrestling in Mexico, Stock continued to work for various promotions in the United States and worked several tours through Europe, where among others, she worked for the now defunct Lucha Libre España Wrestling, wrestling for the LLEW World Women's championship. In November 2003 Stock worked matches for World Xtreme Wrestling. On November 23, she wrestled a match for Ring of Honor (ROH), where she lost to Allison Danger. She also had a match in Ohio Valley Wrestling (OVW), which at the time was a developmental promotion for World Wrestling Entertainment (WWE).

On April 2, 2004, Stock lost her mask in a forty-five minute mask vs. mask match against Princesa Sujei at a Lucha Libre Femenil event. Shortly thereafter, she decided to leave Monterrey to move to Mexico City and wrestle for Lucha Libre AAA World Wide (AAA). Although Stock began appearing with AAA under the assumption that she would be wrestling, the company had her start out by holding up signs for the crowd at events. Stock did not wrestle regularly for AAA, and she stopped appearing for the promotion after a few sporadic shows.

=== Consejo Mundial de Lucha Libre (2004–2015) ===
Upon returning to Mexico, Stock signed with Consejo Mundial de Lucha Libre (CMLL), AAA's rival promotion. She began working regularly for CMLL as Dark Angel in the promotion's newly rebuilt women's division, while also working for various independent promotions. On March 25, 2005, she defeated Princesa Sujei to win Federación Internacional de Lucha Libre Women's Championship. On September 9, Stock was one of two winners, along with Marcela, of a Torneo cibernetico elimination match to determine who would get to battle for the vacant CMLL World Women's Championship. However, on September 16, at CMLL's 72nd Anniversary Show, Marcela defeated Stock to win the title. Afterwards, Stock entered a feud with La Amapola, which concluded on April 14, 2006, when Stock put her hair on the line against Amapola's mask. Stock ended up winning the match and forcing Amapola to unmask herself.

In September 2006, Stock toured the Canadian Maritimes with MainStream Wrestling, where she once again wrestled Kyle Kruze, the MSW Atlantic Canadian Champion, and beat him in all three of their matches. Because the title was not on the line, however, she did not win the belt. She also had several high-profile matches against Nattie Neidhart, daughter of professional wrestler Jim Neidhart. Stock and Neidhart split the series, with Stock winning two matches and Neidhart winning three.

Returning to CMLL, Stock competed in, and won, a bodybuilding contest between CMLL wrestlers, a contest she would win three times in a row. While working for the promotion, she also appeared in a commercial for PlayStation 3. An agent came to the arena looking for someone to perform a stunt for the commercial, and Stock was given the role. On November 25, 2009, Stock won the CMLL Bodybuilding Contest for the fourth year in a row. She would go on to pick her fifth, sixth, seventh and eighth victories in the contest on November 25, 2010, November 24, 2011, November 29, 2012, and November 26, 2014.

In April 2011, it was announced that Stock, as Dark Angel, would be the basis of a three-part action-horror comic book series titled Dark Legacy.

On August 26, 2015, Stock announced she would be leaving CMLL and Mexico, following September 18. Her final match took place at the 82nd Anniversary Show, where she defeated Princesa Sugehit.

=== Japan (2005, 2009, 2010, 2012–2013, 2015) ===
Stock, working under the ring name Dark Angel, made her first tour of Japan in mid-2005, when she worked mainly for the JDStar promotion. She returned to Japan on February 22, 2009, when she took part in the Fuka Matsuri event in Tokyo, during which she defeated Ray in a singles match. She returned to take part in the final Fuka Matsuri event on March 28, 2010, during which she teamed with fellow CMLL wrestler Hiroka in a tag team match, where they were defeated by Leon and Tigre Fuka. On April 5, Dark Angel defeated Princesa Sujei at an event in Shin-Kiba 1st Ring, and was handed Arsion promotion's Sky High of Arsion Championship belt as a trophy. The title had been retired in 2002 and Stock is not recognized as one of the champions.

Dark Angel returned to Japan on March 4, 2012, to take part in Io Shirai's fifth anniversary event, which saw her and Shirai defeat Miho Wakizawa and Nanae Takahashi in the main event. A week later, Dark Angel made her debut for World Wonder Ring Stardom, during which she affiliated herself with Io Shirai's Planet stable. In a six-woman tag team match, which celebrated Dark Angel's ten-year anniversary in professional wrestling, she, Shirai and Arisa Hoshiki defeated Eri Susa, Hiroyo Matsumoto and Miho Wakizawa. On July 13, Stardom announced Dark Angel as a participant in the 5★Star GP2012 tournament, which ran from August 19 to September 30. After wins over Saki Kashima, Kairi Hojo and Kyoko Kimura and a loss against Miho Wakizawa, Dark Angel headed to final day of the tournament at the top of her round-robin block, however, a loss to Natsuki☆Taiyo meant that she missed advancing to the finals of the tournament. In Dark Angel's final match of the tour on October 3, she and Io Shirai wrestled Miho Wakizawa and Nanae Takahashi to a twenty-minute time limit draw. Dark Angel was scheduled to return to Stardom on March 3, 2013, but due to a visa issue, she had to postpone her return until March 10, when she, Io Shirai and Yuzuki Aikawa defeated Act Yasukawa, Natsuki☆Taiyo and Yoshiko in a six-woman tag team main event. On March 24, Dark Angel entered a four-woman tournament to determine the number one contender to the World of Stardom Championship. After defeating Hiroyo Matsumoto in the semi-finals, she was defeated by Io Shirai in the finals. On April 29 at Ryōgoku Cinderella, Dark Angel defeated Act Yasukawa to win the vacant Wonder of Stardom Championship. Dark Angel made her first successful defense of the title on May 19 against Miho Wakizawa. On June 2, she made another successful title defense against Yuhi. Dark Angel returned to Stardom on August 17 to make her third successful title defense against Takumi Iroha. From August 25 to September 23, Dark Angel took part in 5★Star GP2013, where she finished with a record of two wins and three losses, failing to qualify for the finals. On November 4 at Stardom's 100th event, Dark Angel lost the Wonder of Stardom Championship to Act Yasukawa in her fourth title defense.

After signing with WWE, Dark Angel returned to Stardom for two farewell appearances. In the first on October 4, 2015, she teamed with Mayu Iwatani in a tag team match, where they defeated Chelsea and Kairi Hojo. Dark Angel's final Stardom match took place on October 11, when she unsuccessfully challenged Io Shirai for the Wonder of Stardom Championship.

=== Shimmer Women Athletes (2007–2008, 2010) ===
On June 1, 2007, Stock, under her real name, made her debut for Shimmer Women Athletes, an all-female wrestling promotion based in Berwyn, Illinois. She was brought in the promotion for Volume 11 as an "international wildcard competitor" in the tournament to crown the inaugural Shimmer Champion. She started her Shimmer career with two upset victories over established main eventers Cheerleader Melissa and MsChif, but in the end lost a semi-final match against the eventual winner of the tournament, Sara Del Rey, on Volume 12. On October 13, 2007, at Volume 15, Stock defeated Daizee Haze to earn a championship match on Volume 16, taped later that same evening. Stock faced Del Rey in a two out of three falls match for Del Rey's title belt, but was defeated two falls to one. On April 26, 2008, Stock returned to Shimmer to take part in the tapings of Volumes 17 and 18. After defeating Lacey, Stock was defeated by Cheerleader Melissa in a rematch of their Shimmer Championship tournament match.

On February 5, 2010, Shimmer announced that after a two-year absence, Stock would be returning to the company in April for the tapings of Volumes 29 to 32. Stock returned on April 10 at the tapings of Volume 29, announcing that she would be challenging for the Shimmer Championship on Volume 30, taped later that same day. On Volume 30, MsChif defeated Stock to retain her championship. The following day on Volume 32, Stock defeated one half of the Shimmer Tag Team Champions, Nicole Matthews, in a singles match.

=== Total Nonstop Action Wrestling ===
==== Storyline with Taylor Wilde (2009–2010) ====
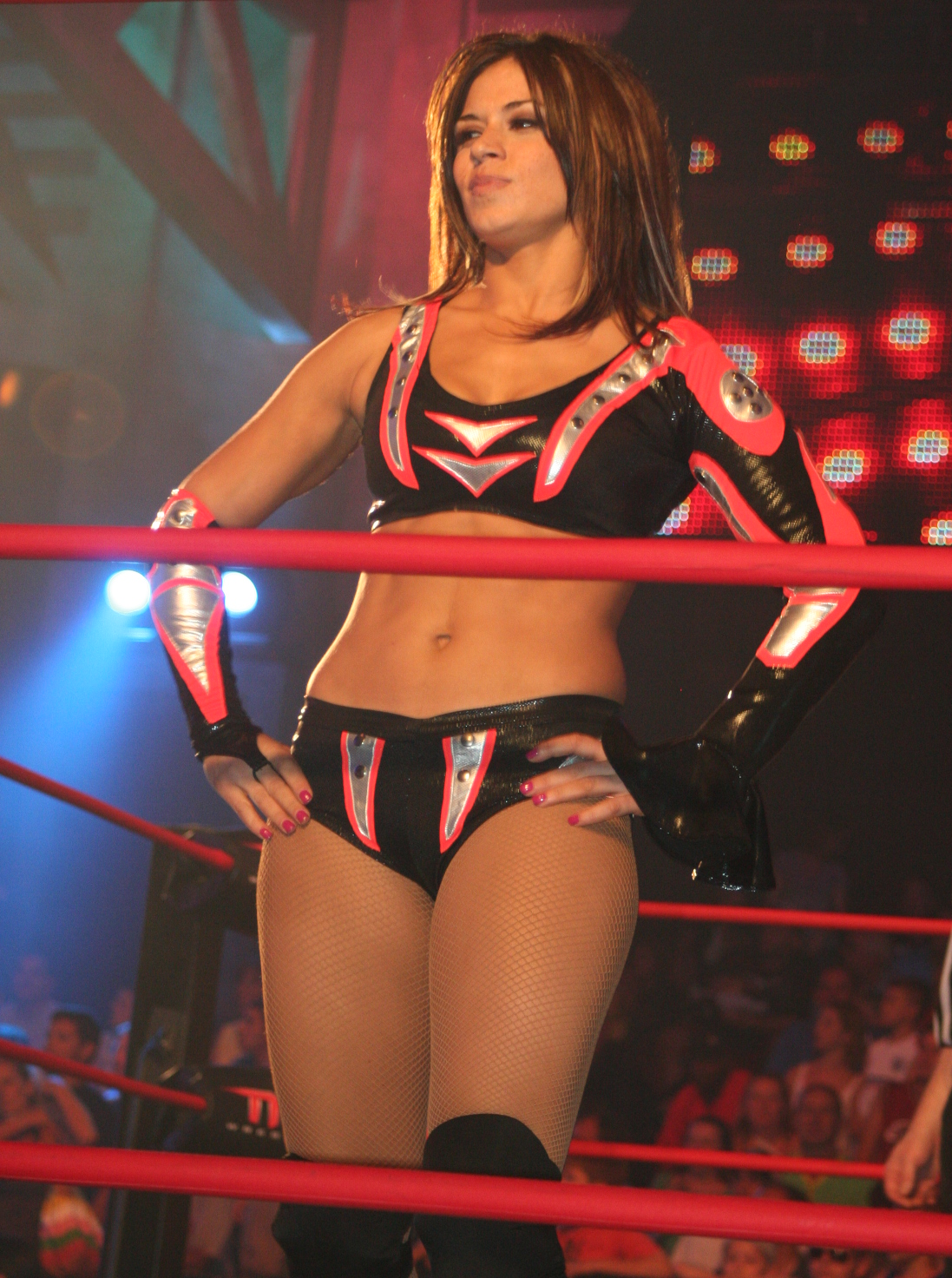
Sarita in July 2010

On April 21, 2009, Stock wrestled a dark match for Total Nonstop Action Wrestling (TNA), where she was defeated by Awesome Kong. She then defeated Taylor Wilde in another dark match the following day. On the May 11, 2009, episode of the Spanish-language version of TNA Today, Stock was introduced as Sarita. Stock made her debut as a face on the July 16 episode of Impact!, defeating Alissa Flash. During August and September, Sarita teamed with Taylor Wilde in a tournament, where the winners would be crowned the inaugural Knockouts Tag Team Champions. After defeating the teams of Alissa Flash and Daffney and Awesome Kong and Raisha Saeed, Sarita and Wilde defeated The Beautiful People (Madison Rayne and Velvet Sky) at No Surrender to win the championship. At Bound for Glory, Sarita and Wilde retained the Knockouts Tag Team Championship when they defeated The Beautiful People (Madison Rayne and Velvet Sky). On November 15 at Turning Point, Sarita, Wilde and ODB defeated The Beautiful People (Lacey Von Erich, Madison Rayne and Velvet Sky) in a six-woman tag team match; as a result, Sarita and Wilde retained the Knockouts Tag Team Championship and ODB the TNA Women's Knockout Championship. On the December 17 episode of Impact!, Sarita and Wilde were defeated by Awesome Kong and Hamada in non-title three-way match, which also included The Beautiful People. This led to a match on the January 4, 2010, live episode of Impact!, where Sarita and Wilde lost the Knockouts Tag Team Championship to Kong and Hamada.

Sarita began turning villainous on the June 25 episode of Xplosion, when she interfered and helped Wilde defeat Daffney to end the team's long losing streak. The following week, when Wilde confronted her tag team partner and explained that she did not want to win by cheating, Sarita claimed that she was a winner and, unlike Wilde, did not need her tag team partner's help in her match against Daffney. After Sarita was defeated by Daffney in a singles match, Wilde came to the ring and stopped her tag team partner from attacking her opponent. On the July 1 episode of Impact!, Sarita cemented her villainous turn by attacking Wilde after she had lost her match against the Knockouts Champion Madison Rayne, proclaiming she was sick of losing matches. Sarita and Wilde faced each other on the following episode of Xplosion, with Sarita picking up the pinfall victory by putting her feet on the ropes for leverage. On the July 15 episode of Impact!, Sarita defeated Wilde again, this time in a Street Fight. At the July 26 tapings of Impact!, Stock tore her triceps and was expected to miss two months of in-ring action. She returned at the September 6 tapings of Xplosion, defeating Daffney.

==== Mexican America (2011–2013) ====
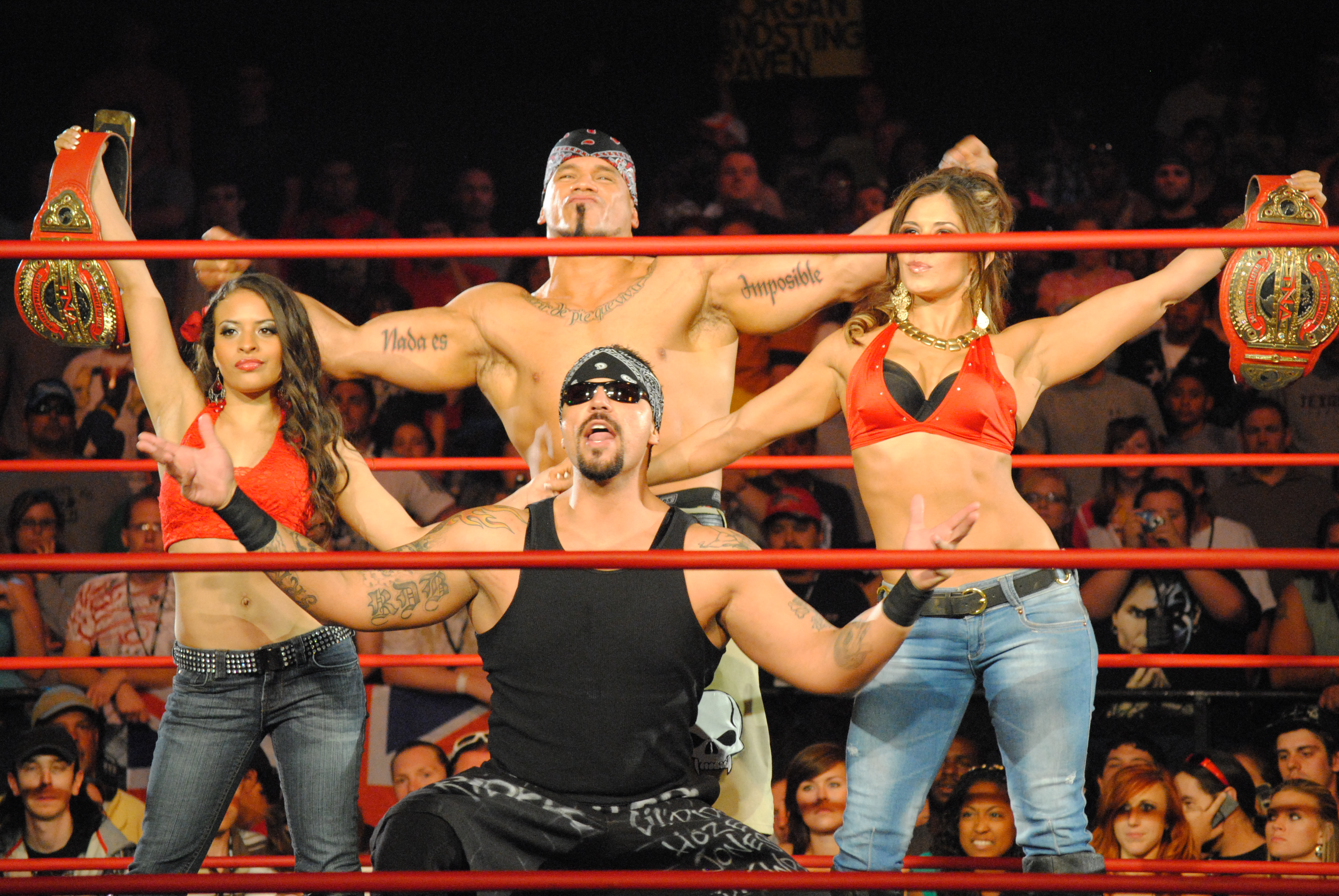
Stock (right) as a member of l1=Mexican America in June 2011

The following month, Sarita entered a feud with Velvet Sky, scoring back-to-back pinfall victories over her on the October 28 and the November 4 episodes of Impact!, first in a six-woman tag team match and then in a singles match. Sarita and Taylor Wilde had their third match at the November 9 tapings of Xplosion, with Sarita once again coming out victorious. Despite wrestling on the November 25 episode of Impact! as a face, when she answered the challenge of TNA Women's Knockout Champion Madison Rayne and then defeated her in a non-title match, Sarita resumed her status as a heel and her feud with Sky on the December 9 episode of Impact! when, despite losing to her and Love in the first round match of a tournament for the TNA Knockouts Tag Team Championship, Sarita claimed that Sky was a loser, and would never be able to beat her. On the December 23 episode of Impact!, Sky was set to wrestle for the Knockouts Tag Team Championship, but was forced to miss the match, after being attacked backstage by Sarita. The following week, Sarita defeated Sky in a Strap match. On the February 10 episode of Impact!, Sarita's on-screen cousin, Rosita, made her TNA debut in an eight-woman tag team match, where the duo teamed with Madison Rayne and Tara and defeated Angelina Love, Mickie James, Velvet Sky and Winter. The following week, Sarita and Rosita aligned themselves with Hernandez, who had returned from working in Mexico the previous week and had begun expressing anti-American views. Later in the evening, Sarita and Rosita defeated Angelina Love and Velvet Sky in a tag team match. Afterwards, Sky challenged Sarita to a one-on-one match, where she agreed to put her career on the line. On the March 3 episode of Impact!, Sky was able to defeat Sarita in a singles match, salvaging her career in the process.

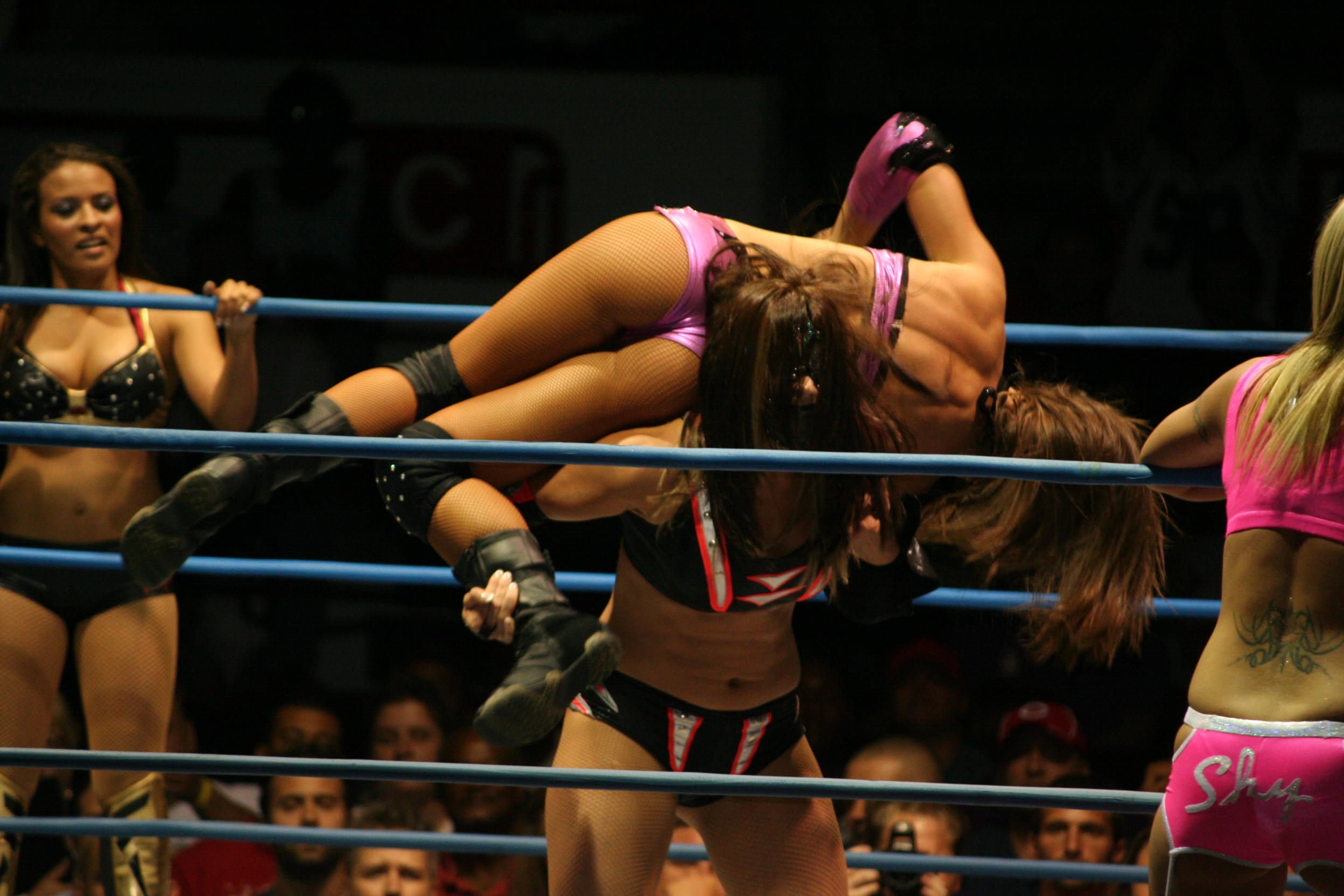
Sarita performing a "La Reinera" on Brooke Tessmacher, 2013

On March 13 at Victory Road, Sarita and Rosita defeated Angelina Love and Winter to win the TNA Knockouts Tag Team Championship, with Sarita proclaiming that their victory would start a "Mexican takeover" of TNA. On the following episode of Impact!, the alliance of Sarita, Rosita and Hernandez was named Mexican America. The three of them were then defeated in a six-person street fight by Love, Winter and Matt Morgan. On the March 24 episode of Impact!, Anarquia became the fourth member of the group. In the following weeks, Sarita and Rosita successfully defended the Knockouts Tag Team Championship, first against The Beautiful People (Angelina Love and Velvet Sky), and then against Madison Rayne and Tara. They made their third successful defense on the June 16 episode of Impact Wrestling, defeating Velvet Sky and Ms. Tessmacher, following interference from ODB. In early July, Stock was sidelined from in-ring competition after suffering facial paralysis. On the July 21 episode of Impact Wrestling, Sarita, wearing a protective mask, and Rosita lost the Knockouts Tag Team Championship to Ms. Tessmacher and Tara. Sarita and Rosita received a rematch for the title on August 7 at Hardcore Justice, but were again defeated by Tessmacher and Tara. Sarita was eventually unmasked on October 16, during the Bound for Glory pre-show by Ink Inc. member Toxxin. The following month at Turning Point, Sarita, Anarquia and Hernandez faced Ink Inc.'s Jesse Neal, Shannon Moore and Toxxin in a six-person tag team match for the TNA World Tag Team Championship, which Mexican America managed to retain, when Sarita pinned Toxxin after hitting her with the title belt. On the March 22, 2012, episode of Impact Wrestling, Sarita and Rosita again failed to recapture the Knockouts Tag Team Championship, when they were defeated by Eric Young and ODB. Sarita and Rosita were given another title opportunity on April 15 at Lockdown, but were once again defeated by Eric Young and ODB, this time in a tag team steel cage match. Afterwards, both Sarita and Rosita went inactive from TNA, while Anarquia left the promotion and Hernandez turned face, effectively disbanding Mexican America.

Sarita returned to work a house show main event on June 14 in Belton, Texas, in which she, Rosita, Angelina Love and Winter were defeated by Mickie James, Tara and Velvet Sky, before once again going inactive from TNA. After seven months of inactivity, it was reported on January 9, 2013, that Stock had parted ways with TNA.

=== WWE (2015–2020) ===
On April 13, 2015, it was reported that Stock was working as a guest trainer for a week at WWE's WWE Performance Center in Orlando, Florida. Stock then made an appearance as part of Tyler Breeze's entrance at the NXT TakeOver: Unstoppable event on May 20. In September 2015, it was reported that Stock had signed with WWE as a developmental trainer, which was confirmed by Stock the following month.

She was furloughed, along with many other WWE employees, on April 15, 2020, and was officially released on September 10.

=== All Elite Wrestling (2023–2025) ===
On March 15, 2023, before a taping of AEW Rampage, AEW President and CEO Tony Khan introduced Stock as the newest AEW coach and producer. On April 17, 2025, it was reported that Stock had been released by AEW.

== Championships and accomplishments ==
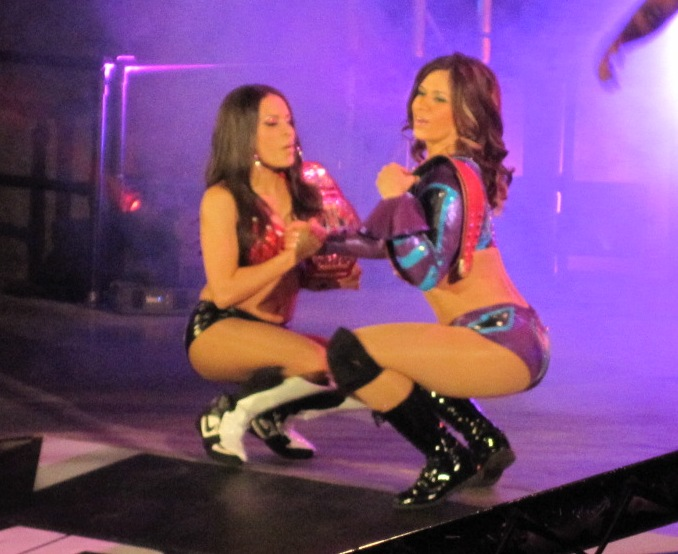
Sarita (right) and Rosita as the TNA Knockouts Tag Team Champions

- Alianza Universal de Lucha Libre
  - AULL Copa Internacional Femenil (2007)
- Beauty Slammers
  - Beauty Slammers Championship (1 time)
- Can-Am Wrestling
  - Can-Am Wrestling Women's Championship (1 time)
- Consejo Mundial de Lucha Libre
  - CMLL Bodybuilding Contest (2006–2012, 2014)
- Federación Internacional de Lucha Libre
  - FILL Women's Championship (1 time)
- Lucha Libre Feminil
  - LLF Juvenil Championship (1 time)
- Pro Wrestling Illustrated
  - Ranked No. 14 of the top 50 female wrestlers in the PWI Female 50 in 2011
- Total Nonstop Action Wrestling
  - TNA Knockouts Tag Team Championship (2 times, inaugural) – with Taylor Wilde (1) and Rosita (1)
  - TNA Knockouts Tag Team Championship Tournament (2009) – with Taylor Wilde
- World Wonder Ring Stardom
  - Wonder of Stardom Championship (1 time)
- Other titles
  - Nuevo León State Women's Championship (1 time)

== Luchas de Apuestas record ==
Winner (wager)	Loser (wager)	Location	Event	Date	Notes
Princesa Sujei (mask)	Dark Angel (mask)	Monterrey, Nuevo León, Mexico	LLF live event	April 2, 2004	
Dark Angel (hair)	La Amapola (mask)	Mexico City, Mexico	CMLL live event	April 14, 2006	
