= Hard Justice (2009) =

2009 Total Nonstop Action Wrestling pay-per-view event

- Promotional poster featuring Mick Foley
- Promotion: Total Nonstop Action Wrestling
- Date: August 16, 2009
- City: Orlando, Florida
- Venue: TNA Impact! Zone
- Attendance: 1,100

Pay-per-view chronology
← Previous; Victory Road	Next → No Surrender

Hard Justice chronology
← Previous; 2008	Next → 2010

The 2009 Hard Justice was a professional wrestling pay-per-view (PPV) event produced by the Total Nonstop Action Wrestling (TNA) promotion, which took place on August 16, 2009 at the TNA Impact! Zone in Orlando, Florida. It was the fifth event under the Hard Justice chronology. Nine professional wrestling matches were featured on the event's card.

The main event saw Kurt Angle defending his TNA World Heavyweight Championship against Sting and Matt Morgan in a 3 – way match. Kevin Nash defeated Mick Foley to win the TNA Legends Championship. Other matches featured on the card included a Falls Count Anywhere match and a singles match. In the first, The Main Event Mafia (Booker T and Scott Steiner) defeated Team 3D (Brother Ray and Brother Devon) to retain the Tag Team championships. The second was for the TNA X Division Championship, in which Samoa Joe defeated Homicide to win the championship.

The event featured the debut of D'Angelo Dinero in TNA, who had previously worked for the WWE. The event was released on DVD on October 20, 2009 by TNA Home Video.

In October 2017, with the launch of the Global Wrestling Network, the event became available to stream on demand.

== Storylines ==
Other on-screen personnel
Role:	Name:
Commentator	Mike Tenay
Commentator	Don West
Interviewer	Jeremy Borash
Interviewer	Lauren Thompson
Ring announcer	Jeremy Borash
Ring announcer	David Penzer
Referee	Earl Hebner
Referee	Rudy Charles
Referee	Mark Johnson
Referee	Andrew Thomas

Hard Justice featured nine professional wrestling matches that involved different wrestlers from pre-existing scripted feuds and storylines. Wrestlers were portrayed as either villains or heroes in the scripted events that built tension and culminated into a wrestling match or series of matches.

The main feud heading into Hard Justice was between Kurt Angle, Sting, and Matt Morgan over the TNA World Heavyweight Championship. On TNA's primary television program TNA Impact! in the weeks leading to the event, Morgan competed against A.J. Styles for a spot in the main event at Hard Justice. Morgan won their contest and injured Styles in the process. Angle tried to trade Morgan a spot in The Main Event Mafia in exchange for Morgan making sure that Angle kept his title at the event. Sting had been attacked by Angle and The Main Event Mafia on Impact!, and his presence distracted Kevin Nash and Angle long enough for Mick Foley to win the TNA Legends Championship from Nash with the help of Bobby Lashley.

Another feud was between Mick Foley and Kevin Nash over the TNA Legends Championship. Foley had won the title from Nash in a tag team match with special stipulations that also involved Angle and Bobby Lashley. Foley and Nash then argued about whether wrestling was about the wrestling or the money, which heated up their emotions leading into the event.

A feud on the mid-card revolved around Rob Terry stealing Hernandez's Feast or Fired Briefcase which holds a title shot at the TNA World Heavyweight Championship. Their match at Hard Justice would be with the briefcase on the line. The final major feud heading into the event was between Abyss, Dr. Stevie, and Jethro Holliday. Dr. Stevie had offered $50,000 to anyone who could beat Abyss, and Holliday took up the offer and attacked Abyss with a steel chair while he was giving an interview on Impact!.

== Reception ==
411mania.com writer Arnold Furious rated the event 4 out of 10 stars, which was lower than the 2008 event's rating of 7.6 out of 10 stars. The main event for the TNA World Heavyweight Championship was rated a 1.5 out of 5 stars, while the Tag Team Match for the IWGP Tag Team Championship was rated a 2.5 out of 5 stars.

== Results ==
No.	Results	Stipulations	Times
1	Daniels defeated Alex Shelley, Amazing Red, Chris Sabin, Consequences Creed, D'Angelo Dinero, Jay Lethal and Suicide	Steel Asylum match to determine the #1 contender to the TNA X Division Championship at No Surrender	16:33
2	Abyss defeated Jethro Holliday (with Dr. Stevie)	$50,000 Bounty Challenge	08:49
3	Hernandez defeated Rob Terry (with Brutus Magnus and Doug Williams)	Singles match for Hernandez's TNA World Heavyweight Championship Feast or Fired briefcase	00:09
4	The British Invasion (Brutus Magnus and Doug Williams) (c) defeated Beer Money, Inc. (James Storm and Robert Roode)	Tag team match for the IWGP Tag Team Championship	08:45
5	Cody Deaner and ODB defeated The Beautiful People (Angelina Love (c) and Velvet Sky) (with Madison Rayne)	Tag team match for the TNA Women's Knockout Championship	07:26
6	Samoa Joe (with Taz) defeated Homicide (c) by submission	Singles match for the TNA X Division Championship	08:56
7	The Main Event Mafia (Booker T and Scott Steiner) (c) (with Sharmell) defeated Team 3D (Brother Devon and Brother Ray)	Falls Count Anywhere match for the TNA World Tag Team Championship	13:08
8	Kevin Nash defeated Mick Foley (c)	Singles match for the TNA Legends Championship	10:38
9	Kurt Angle (c) defeated Matt Morgan and Sting	Three-Way match for the TNA World Heavyweight Championship	11:22
(c) / – the champion(s) heading into the match
