= Yūjirō =

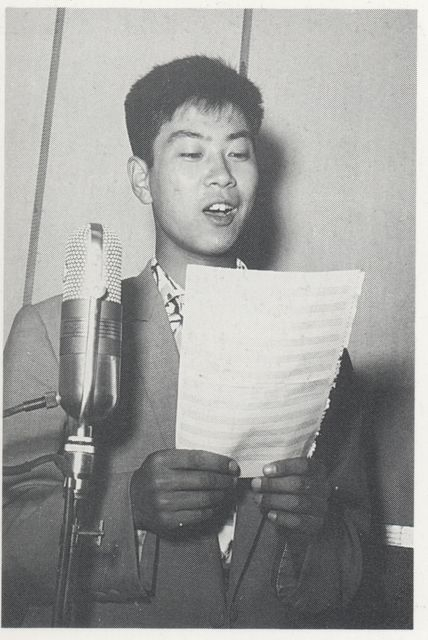
- Yujiro Ishihara (1934–1987), Japanese actor and singer
- Pronunciation: jɯɯdʑiɾoɯ (IPA)
- Gender: Male

Origin
- Origin: Japanese
- Meaning: Different meanings depending on the kanji used

Other names
- Alternative spelling: Yuziro (Kunrei-shiki) Yuziro (Nihon-shiki) Yūjirō, Yujiro, Yuujirou (Hepburn)

Yūjirō, Yujiro or Yuujirou is a masculine Japanese given name.

== Written forms ==
Yūjirō can be written using different combinations of kanji characters. Some examples:

- 勇二郎, "courage, 2, son"
- 勇次郎, "courage, next, son"
- 勇治郎, "courage, to manage, son"
- 雄二郎, "masculine, 2, son"
- 雄次郎, "masculine, next, son"
- 雄治郎, "masculine, to manage, son"
- 裕二郎, "abundant, 2, son"
- 裕次郎, "abundant, next, son"
- 佑二郎, "to help, 2, son"
- 佑次郎, "to help, next, son"

The name can also be written in hiragana ゆうじろう or katakana ユウジロウ.

== Notable people with the name ==
- Yujiro Hayami (速水 佑次郎; 1932–2012), Japanese agricultural economist
- Yujiro Ishihara (石原 裕次郎; 1934–1987), Japanese actor and singer
- Yujiro Kawamata (川又 雄二郎; born 1952), Japanese mathematician
- Yujiro Kushida (櫛田 雄二郎; born 1983), Japanese professional wrestler
- Yūjirō Motora (元良 勇次郎; 1858-1912), Japanese psychologist
- Yujiro Shirakawa (白川 裕二郎; born 1976), Japanese actor and singer
- Yujiro Takahashi (高橋 裕二郎; born 1981), Japanese professional wrestler

== Fictional characters ==
Yujiro Hanma (範馬 勇次郎) from manga and anime Baki the Grappler.
