= Victory Road (2009) =

2009 Total Nonstop Action Wrestling pay-per-view event

- Promotional poster featuring The Beautiful People: Madison Rayne, Angelina Love and Velvet Sky
- Promotion: Total Nonstop Action Wrestling
- Date: July 19, 2009
- City: Orlando, Florida
- Venue: TNA Impact! Zone
- Attendance: 1,100

Pay-per-view chronology
← Previous; Slammiversary	Next → Hard Justice

Victory Road chronology
← Previous; 2008	Next → 2010

The 2009 Victory Road was a professional wrestling pay-per-view (PPV) event produced by Total Nonstop Action Wrestling (TNA), which took place on July 19, 2009, at the TNA Impact! Zone in Orlando, Florida. It was the fifth event under the Victory Road chronology.

== Storylines ==
Other on-screen personnel
Role:	Name:
Commentator	Mike Tenay
Commentator	Don West
Interviewer	Jeremy Borash
Interviewer	Lauren Thompson
Ring announcer	Jeremy Borash
Ring announcer	David Penzer
Referee	Earl Hebner
Referee	Rudy Charles
Referee	Mark Johnson
Referee	Andrew Thomas

Victory Road featured nine professional wrestling matches that involved different wrestlers from pre-existing scripted feuds and storylines. Wrestlers portrayed villains, heroes, or less distinguishable characters in the scripted events that built tension and culminated in a wrestling match or series of matches.

At Slammiversary, TNA's preceding pay per view, Kurt Angle won the TNA World Heavyweight Championship, and subsequently reclaimed his position as leader of the villainous alliance, The Main Event Mafia. Former champion and executive shareholder of the company, Mick Foley, decided to get a rematch for the title at Victory Road.

To appease Angle in getting his match, Foley also gave Main Event Mafia member, Kevin Nash, a match for the TNA Legends Championship against A.J. Styles; he also had created a chance for two other members of the Mafia in Booker T and Scott Steiner to challenge Beer Money, Inc. (the name of the tag team of Robert Roode and James Storm) for the TNA World Tag Team Championship, which they received their chance following their victory over Team 3D (Brother Devon and Brother Ray).

After allowing Angle to win the TNA World Heavyweight Championship at Slammiversary, Samoa Joe was initiated into the Main Event Mafia at the expense of its former leader, Sting, which was represented by the Mafia beating down on Sting the edition of Impact! following the show. After weeks of confrontation between Joe and Sting, it was announced on the July 9 edition of Impact! that the two would face each other at Victory Road.

Abyss had been seeing a psychiatrist for months in the form of Dr. Stevie in an attempt to overcome his sadistic desires; it came to light eventually that Stevie was physically and mentally abusing his patient and controlling him with stun guns and drugs, eventually recruiting associates (Raven and Daffney) to aid him in controlling Abyss in similar fashion, as well as threatening Abyss's love interest, Lauren Brooke. The provocation continued, and on the July 16 edition of Impact!, it was announced Abyss would face Stevie.

== Reception ==
The Wrestling Observer Newsletter named Victory Road as the worst major wrestling show of 2009, while the match between Jenna Morasca and Sharmell was named the worst match of 2009 by the same publication and is widely regarded as being among the worst televised professional wrestling matches of all-time. Figure Four Weekly webmaster Bryan Alvarez said on the July 19, 2009 edition of "The Bryan and Vinny Show" that he could not rate any match above two and a half stars, and was critical of the finish to the Beer Money vs. Booker T and Scott Steiner match saying that referee Earl Hebner should not be able to get into a ring faster than James Storm. Alvarez saved his harshest criticism for the Jenna/Sharmell match; not only did he give it a minus five star rating and call it the worst women's match he had ever seen, he said he had been unable to remember the last time he had done so because it had been so long since he had seen a match that bad.

The Morasca vs. Sharmell match is widely considered one of the worst matches in wrestling history. Dutch Mantell called it "the worst match [he] had ever seen." Dave Meltzer gave the match minus four stars out of five, and WhatCulture ranked it as the second worst TNA match ever.

== Results ==
No.	Results	Stipulations	Times
1	Angelina Love (with Madison Rayne and Velvet Sky) defeated Tara (c)	Singles match for the TNA Knockouts Championship	07:02
2	Matt Morgan defeated Daniels	Singles match	10:31
3	Abyss defeated Dr. Stevie	No Disqualification match	09:51
4	Team 3D (Brother Devon and Brother Ray) (c) defeated The British Invasion (Brutus Magnus and Doug Williams) (with Rob Terry)	Tag team match for the IWGP Tag Team Championship	10:16
5	Jenna Morasca (with Awesome Kong) defeated Sharmell (with Sojournor Bolt)	Singles match	05:49
6	Kevin Nash defeated A.J. Styles (c)	Singles match for the TNA Legends Championship	14:07
7	The Main Event Mafia (Booker T and Scott Steiner) defeated Beer Money, Inc. (James Storm and Robert Roode) (c)	Tag team match for the TNA World Tag Team Championship	12:29
8	Samoa Joe defeated Sting by submission	Singles match	11:36
9	Kurt Angle (c) defeated Mick Foley by submission	Singles match for the TNA World Heavyweight Championship	14:06
(c) / – the champion(s) heading into the match
