= TNA Sacrifice (2010) =

2010 Total Nonstop Action Wrestling pay-per-view event

Sacrifice (2010)
- Promotional poster featuring Rob Van Dam
- Promotion: Total Nonstop Action Wrestling
- Date: May 16, 2010
- City: Orlando, Florida
- Venue: TNA Impact! Zone
- Attendance: 1,100
- Tagline: What Sacrifice Would You Be Willing To Make?

Pay-per-view chronology
← Previous; Lockdown	Next → Slammiversary VIII

Sacrifice chronology
← Previous; 2009	Next → 2011

The 2010 Sacrifice was a professional wrestling pay-per-view event produced by Total Nonstop Action Wrestling (TNA), which took place on May 16, 2010 at the TNA Impact! Zone in Orlando, Florida. It is the sixth event under the Sacrifice chronology and the fifth event of the 2010 TNA PPV schedule.

Ten matches were contested at the event. In the main event, Rob Van Dam defeated AJ Styles to retain the TNA World Heavyweight Championship. In other prominent matches, Sting defeated Jeff Jarrett, Jeff Hardy defeated Mr. Anderson, and in the opening contest, The Motor City Machine Guns (Alex Shelley and Chris Sabin) defeated Beer Money, Inc. (James Storm and Robert Roode) and Team 3D (Brother Devon and Brother Ray) to determine the #1 contenders to the TNA World Tag Team Championship.

== Storylines ==
Other on-screen personnel
Commentators	Mike Tenay
Commentators	Taz
Ring announcer	Jeremy Borash
Referee	Earl Hebner
Referee	Brian Hebner
Referee	Brian Stiffler

Sacrifice featured nine professional wrestling matches that involved different wrestlers from pre-existing scripted feuds and storylines. Wrestlers portrayed villains, heroes, or less distinguishable characters in the scripted events that built tension and culminated in a wrestling match or series of matches.

== Results ==
No.	Results	Stipulations	Times
1	The Motor City Machine Guns (Alex Shelley and Chris Sabin) defeated Beer Money, Inc. (James Storm and Robert Roode) and Team 3D (Brother Devon and Brother Ray)	Three-Way Dance to determine #1 contenders for the TNA World Tag Team Championship	13:13
2	Rob Terry (c) defeated Orlando Jordan	Singles match for the TNA Global Championship	07:45
3	Douglas Williams defeated Kazarian (c)	Singles match for the TNA X Division Championship	13:50
4	Madison Rayne (c) defeated Tara	Title vs. Career match for the TNA Women's Knockout Championship	06:28
5	The Band (Kevin Nash and Scott Hall) (c) defeated Ink Inc. (Jesse Neal and Shannon Moore)	Tag team match for the TNA World Tag Team Championship	08:47
6	Abyss defeated Desmond Wolfe (with Chelsea)	Singles match	09:27
7	Jeff Hardy defeated Mr. Anderson	Singles match	13:57
8	Sting defeated Jeff Jarrett	Singles match	00:14
9	Rob Van Dam (c) defeated A.J. Styles (with Ric Flair)	Singles match for the TNA World Heavyweight Championship	24:47
(c) / – the champion(s) heading into the match
