= TNA Against All Odds (2010) =

2010 Total Nonstop Action Wrestling pay-per-view event

Against All Odds (2010)
- Promotional poster featuring (clockwise) A.J. Styles, Hulk Hogan, Kurt Angle, and Mick Foley
- Promotion: Total Nonstop Action Wrestling
- Date: February 14, 2010
- City: Orlando, Florida
- Venue: TNA Impact! Zone
- Attendance: 1,100
- Tagline(s): The countdown to Lockdown begins

Pay-per-view chronology
← Previous; Genesis	Next → Destination X

Against All Odds chronology
← Previous; 2009	Next → 2011

The 2010 Against All Odds was a professional wrestling pay-per-view (PPV) event produced by the Total Nonstop Action Wrestling (TNA) promotion, which took place on February 14, 2010 at the TNA Impact! Zone in Orlando, Florida. It was the sixth event under the Against All Odds chronology and the second event of the 2010 TNA PPV scheduled.

== Storylines ==
Other on-screen personnel
Commentators	Mike Tenay
Commentators	Taz
Ring announcer	Jeremy Borash
Referee	Earl Hebner
Referee	Brian Hebner
Referee	Brian Stiffler

Against All Odds featured nine professional wrestling matches that involved different wrestlers from pre-existing scripted feuds and storylines. Wrestlers were portrayed as villains, heroes or less distinguishable characters in the scripted events that build tension and culminate into a wrestling match or series of matches.

== Results ==
No.	Results	Stipulations	Times
1	D'Angelo Dinero defeated Desmond Wolfe (with Chelsea)	First round of the 8 Card Stud Tournament	07:39
2	Matt Morgan defeated Hernandez	First round of the 8 Card Stud Tournament	08:50
3	Mr. Anderson defeated Kurt Angle	First round of the 8 Card Stud Tournament	09:44
4	Abyss defeated Mick Foley	No Disqualification match, First round of the 8 Card Stud Tournament	07:40
5	The Nasty Boys (Brian Knobbs and Jerry Sags) defeated Team 3D (Brother Devon and Brother Ray)	Tag team match	10:39
6	D'Angelo Dinero defeated Matt Morgan	Semi-Finals of the 8 Card Stud Tournament	08:20
7	Mr. Anderson defeated Abyss	Semi-Finals of the 8 Card Stud Tournament	08:07
8	A.J. Styles (c) (with Ric Flair) defeated Samoa Joe	No Disqualification match for the TNA World Heavyweight Championship with Eric Bischoff as special guest referee (This was Joe's Feast or Fired World Title match)	21:26
9	D'Angelo Dinero defeated Mr. Anderson	Finals of the 8 Card Stud Tournament	15:56
(c) / – the champion(s) heading into the match

=== Tournament bracket ===
8 Card Stud Tournament for a shot at the TNA World Heavyweight Championship at Lockdown.

Quarterfinals
D'Angelo Dinero	Pin
Desmond Wolfe	07:38
Hernandez	Pin
Matt Morgan	08:58
Kurt Angle	Pin
Mr. Anderson	09:49
Mick Foley	Pin
Abyss	07:44

Semifinals
D'Angelo Dinero	Pin
Matt Morgan	08:30
Abyss	Pin
Mr. Anderson	08:07

Finals
Mr. Anderson	Pin
D'Angelo Dinero	15:45

== See also ==
- 2010 in professional wrestling
