= ROH Rising Above =

- Promotions: Ring of Honor
- First event: Rising Above (2007)
- Last event: Rising Above (2008)

ROH Rising Above was a professional wrestling pay-per-view (PPV) event produced by Ring of Honor.

== Events ==
| # | Event | Date | Venue | City | Main Event |
|---|---|---|---|---|---|
| 1 | Rising Above (2007) | December 29, 2007 (taped); March 7, 2008 (aired) | Manhattan Center | New York, New York | The Briscoe Brothers (Jay Briscoe and Mark Briscoe) (c) vs. No Remorse Corps (Roderick Strong and Rocky Romero) in a Two out of Three Falls match for the ROH World Tag Team Championship. |
| 2 | Rising Above (2008) | November 22, 2008 (taped); January 16, 2009 (aired) | Frontier Fieldhouse | Chicago Ridge, Illinois | Nigel McGuinness (c) vs. Bryan Danielson for the ROH World Championship. |
(c) – refers to the champion(s) heading into the match
