= Beer Money, Inc. =

Professional wrestling tag team

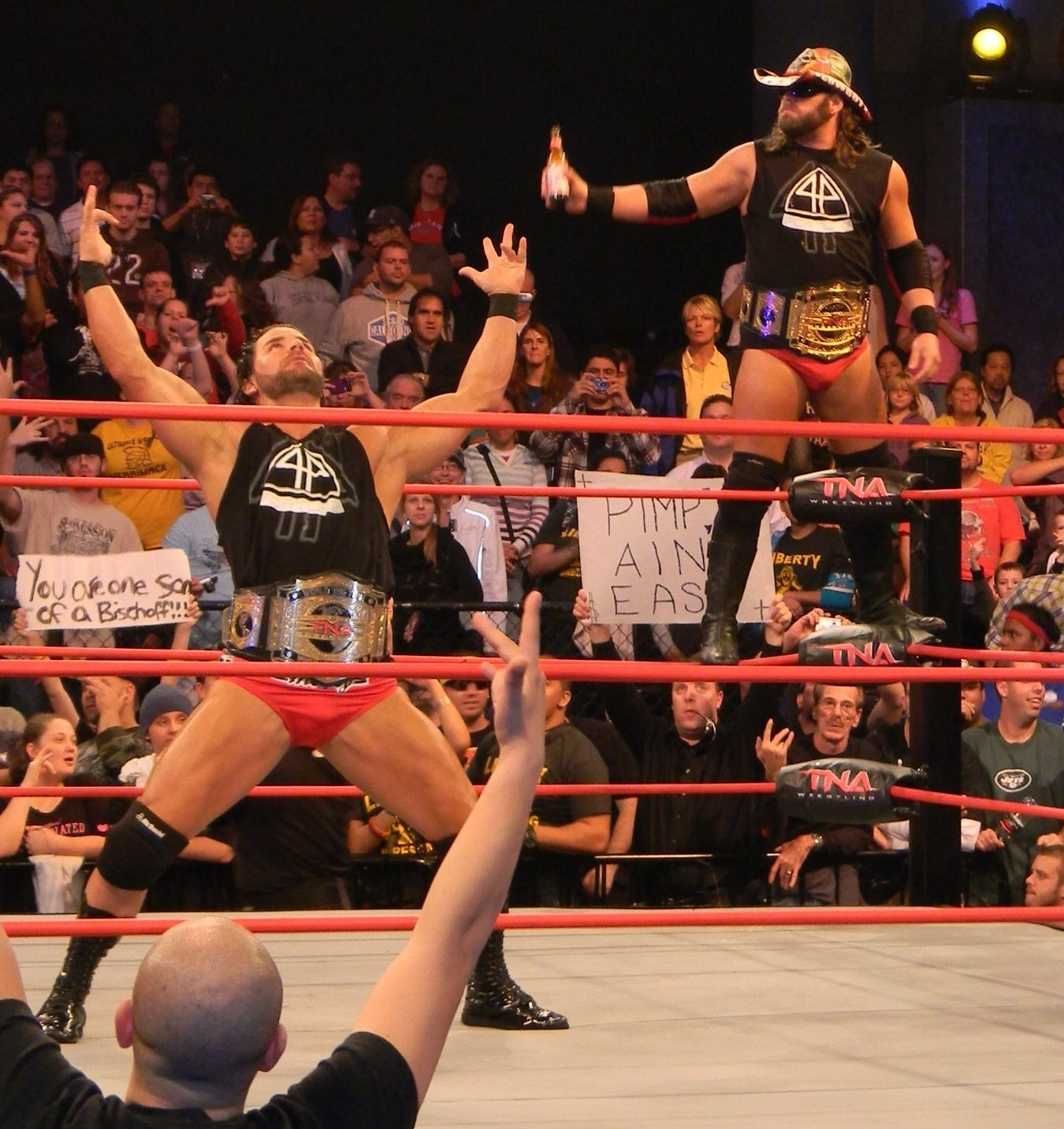
- Bobby Roode (left) and James Storm (right)

Tag team
- Members: Robert/Bobby Roode; James Storm
- Name(s): Beer Money; Beer Money, Inc. Robert Roode and James Storm Fortune
- Billed heights: 6 ft 1 in (1.85 m) - Roode; 6 ft 0 in (1.83 m) - Storm
- Combined billed weight: 470 lb (210 kg)
- Former members: Jacqueline (valet); Ric Flair (manager)
- Debut: June 12, 2008
- Years active: 2008–2011; 2016

Beer Money, Inc. was a professional wrestling tag team which consisted of Robert "Bobby" Roode and James Storm in the professional wrestling promotion Total Nonstop Action Wrestling (TNA), where they are record-tying five-time TNA World Tag Team Champions, while also holding the record for the longest single reign and longest combined reigns as champions. From 2008 to 2009, the team was managed by Storm's continuing manager Jacqueline.

== History ==
=== Total Nonstop Action Wrestling ===
==== Background (2008–2009) ====
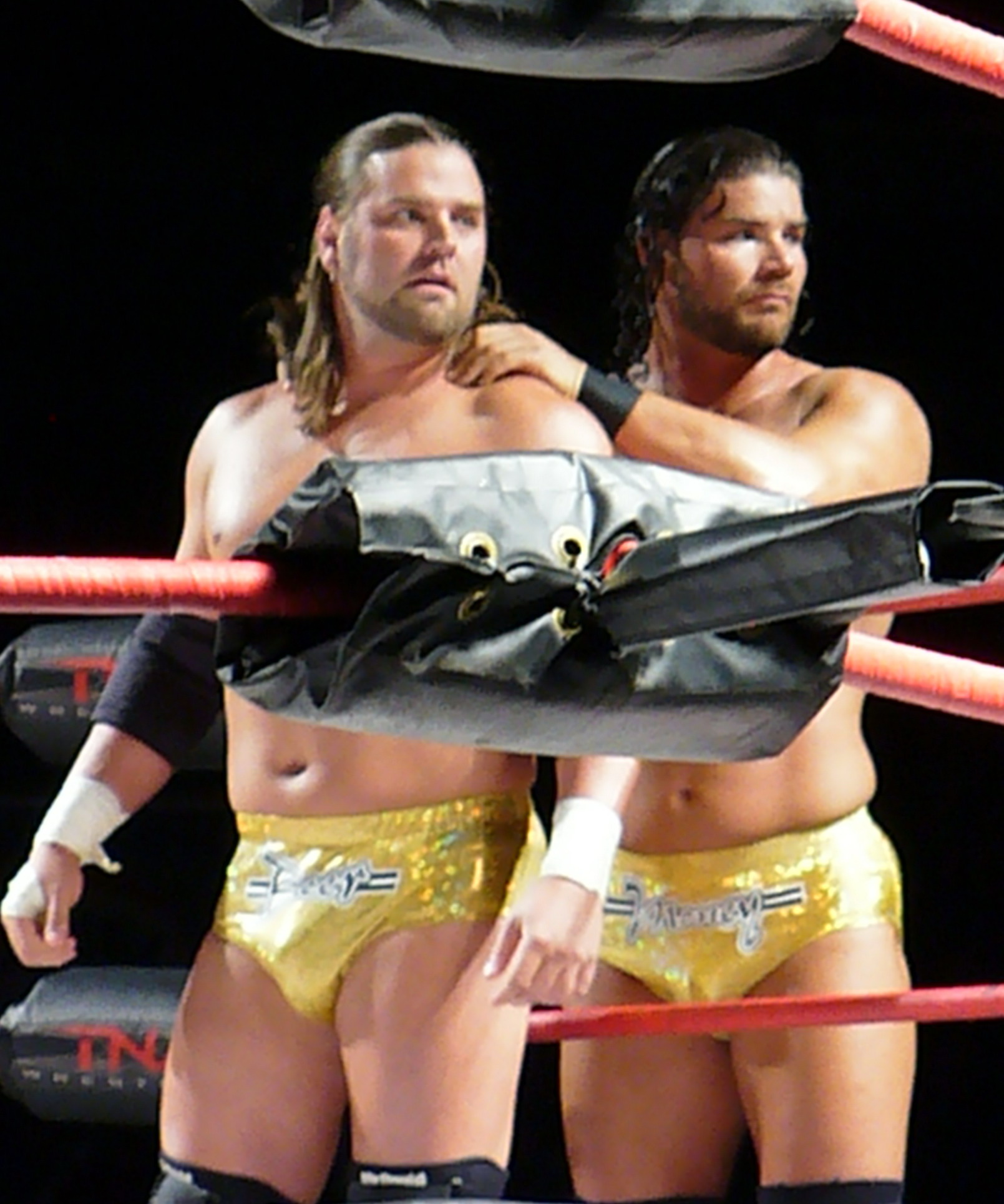
Beer Money in September 2008.

James Storm and Robert Roode had teamed up on several occasions over the years prior and following the end of their alliances in America's Most Wanted and Team Canada respectively, but it wasn't until the second quarter of 2008 that they started to become a regular tag team. On the June 12, 2008 episode of TNA's primary television program, TNA Impact!, Storm and Roode challenged The Latin American Xchange (LAX) (Homicide and Hernandez) for the TNA World Tag Team Championship. Storm and Roode were successful in winning the match following a superkick from Storm, which he named the Last Call, to Hernandez with a leather-belt wrapped around his boot. LAX's manager, Hector Guerrero, was at ringside and informed the referee about what happened and the match was restarted. LAX ended up retaining the titles after the restart. After the match, Storm, Roode and Jacqueline handcuffed LAX to the ring posts, and then proceeded to whip them with leather belts. Later that night they challenged LAX to retaliate. The next week on Impact!, LAX challenged Storm and Roode to a Fan's Revenge Match at Victory Road for the titles, which would involve the two teams fighting in a ring surrounded by legitimate fans of the promotion armed with leather belts.

Furthering the feud, the following week on Impact!, Homicide challenged Roode to a Parking Lot Brawl, which he accepted. Although both Storm and Hernandez were meant to be barred from the area, Storm interfered during the brawl, and the two dragged Homicide back into the arena and attacked him, until Hernandez saved him. At Victory Road, LAX retained the titles. At Hard Justice, there was a rematch where Beer Money defeated LAX to win the TNA World Tag Team Championship. In the rematch at No Surrender, Beer Money defeated LAX to retain the titles. Two weeks later, on Impact!, they faced LAX again in a Six Person Mixed Tag Team match with the two teams managers also competing, in which the losing team would lose the services of their manager. Beer Money won the bout, and as per the pre-match stipulation, Guerrero could no longer be LAX's manager. After that Beer Money retained the tag team titles at Turning Point against The Motor City Machine Guns (Alex Shelley and Chris Sabin).

Beer Money, Inc. later engaged in a feud with Matt Morgan and Abyss, retaining the titles against them at Final Resolution. On the January 8 episode of Impact!, they lost the titles to Jay Lethal and Consequences Creed after Lethal cashed in his Feast or Fired briefcase. At Genesis, they won back the TNA World Tag Team Championship by defeating Matt Morgan and Abyss and Lethal and Creed in a 3-Way Dance. Beer Money faced Creed and Lethal again at Against All Odds, with Beer Money retaining the championship.

==== Off the Wagon Challenge and various feuds (2009–2010) ====
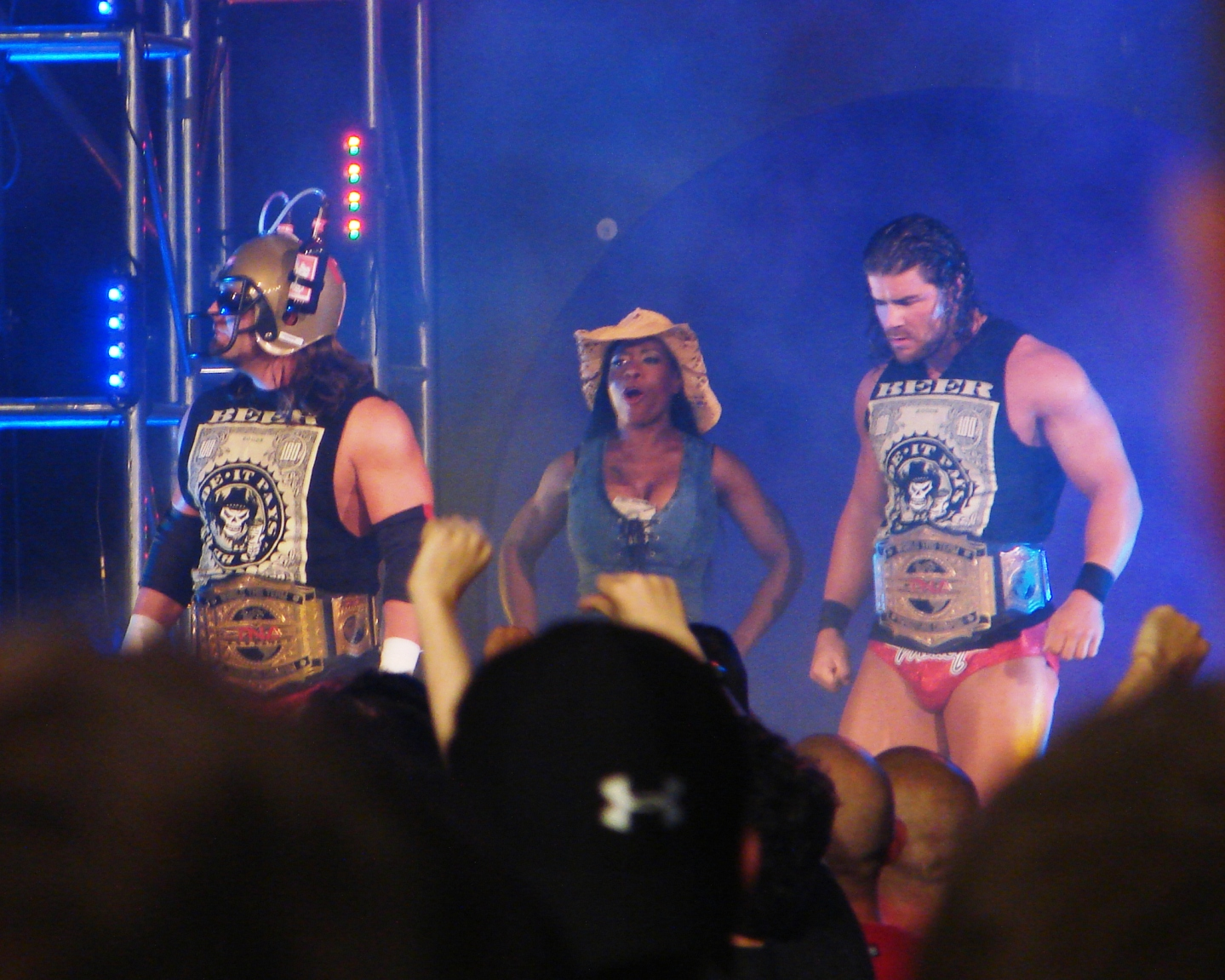
Beer Money, Inc. with then-manager Jacqueline.

On the February 19, 2009 episode of Impact! Beer Money began a weekly segment they called the "Off the Wagon Challenge", where the stipulation was that any two wrestlers could challenge them and they would put the World Tag Team Championship on the line, however, if they were able to retain their belts the wrestler who was pinned or made to submit would be released from TNA. They were first challenged by Eric Young and Petey Williams, in which Williams was pinned. The second challengers were The Rock 'n Rave Infection (Lance Rock and Jimmy Rave), who were defeated when Rock was pinned. On the March 5 episode of Impact!, LAX challenged Beer Money, but were unable to regain the titles as the champions got themselves disqualified. After the match Team 3D (Brother Ray and Brother Devon) saved LAX from a beatdown and announced that they would accept Beer Money's Off the Wagon Challenge at Destination X. At Destination X, Beer Money got themselves disqualified, however Jim Cornette restarted the match and made it a No Disqualification match, in which Roode walked out with Storm draped over his shoulder, resulting in a countout.

At Lockdown, Beer Money lost the TNA World Tag Team titles to Team 3D in a match where Team 3D's IWGP Tag Team titles were also on the line. On the May 21, 2009 episode of TNA Impact!, Beer Money came to Team 3D's aid against The British Invasion (Doug Williams, Brutus Magnus and their bodyguard Rob Terry) and shook hands with 3D afterwards which turned them face. Beer Money then entered Team 3D's Invitational Tag Team Tournament, where the winners would receive a tag team title shot against Team 3D. Beer Money made it all the way to the finals, and they beat The British Invasion at Sacrifice on May 24, 2009, to face Team 3D for the TNA World Tag Team Titles. In the weeks leading up to Slammiversary, Team 3D assisted Beer Money in fending off The British Invasion however, Beer Money didn't return the favour. In the last week before Slammiversary, Beer Money brawled with Team 3D after making crude remarks. At Slammiversary, Beer Money defeated Team 3D to win the TNA World Tag Team Titles for the third time. Two weeks after Slammiversary, Booker T and Scott Steiner of The Main Event Mafia defeated Team 3D to win the right to face Beer Money for the titles at Victory Road, thus entering into a feud with the two. At Victory Road, Beer Money lost the titles to Booker T and Scott Steiner.

The two teams would see their feud intervene with that of Team 3D and the British Invasion, causing a 4-way war that would last the next 3 months. Beer Money would go on to lose to the British Invasion in an IWGP Tag Team Championship match at Hard Justice, win a Lethal Lockdown match at No Surrender (teaming with Team 3D against MEM and the Invasion), and lose a 4-way Full Metal Mayhem match at Bound for Glory for both the TNA and IWGP Tag Team Championships, with Team 3D winning the IWGP belts and the British Invasion the TNA belts. Beer Money were permitted one last title shot the following Impact!, where they fought the British Invasion in a Six Sides of Steel match. Brutus Magnus would have his team disqualified by punching the referee, causing him and Doug Williams to retain the championships. On the November 12 episode of Impact! Beer Money defeated the British Invasion in a non-title match to join the Motor City Machine Guns in the TNA World Tag Team Championship match at Turning Point. At Turning Point, the British Invasion managed to retain their titles after Kevin Nash nailed Storm with the TNA Global Championship belt. At Genesis Roode and Storm scored an upset victory over The Band of Kevin Nash and Syxx-Pac.

==== Fortune (2010–2011) ====
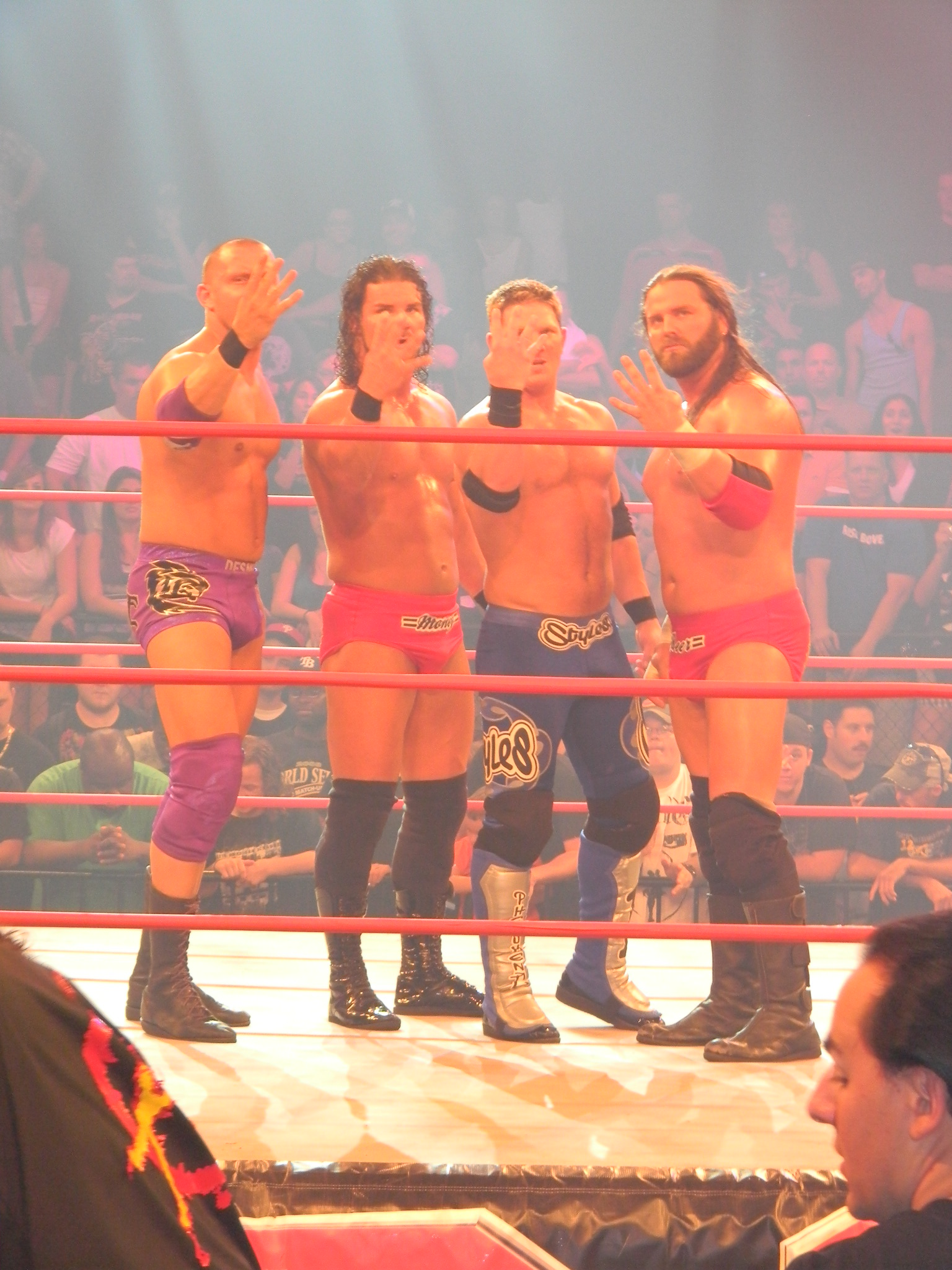
Fortune: (from left to right) Desmond Wolfe, Roode, A.J. Styles and Storm.

With Hulk Hogan and Eric Bischoff taking over TNA at the beginning of 2010, Beer Money's TV time was significantly reduced. Upon their return to Impact!, Beer Money turned heel on the March 8 episode of Impact! by first volunteering to face Jeff Jarrett in a handicap match and then defeating him after a low blow and the DWI, claiming it was the only way they were going to get noticed by the new management. Roode and Storm have since acted as Bischoff's henchmen, taking on wrestlers he's had problems with, often in two-on-one situations. At Destination X Beer Money challenged Matt Morgan and Hernandez for the TNA World Tag Team Championship, but were unable to dethrone the defending champions. At Lockdown Beer Money, along with Sting and Desmond Wolfe, represented Team Flair in the annual Lethal Lockdown match, where they were defeated by Team Hogan (Abyss, Jeff Jarrett, Rob Van Dam and Jeff Hardy). They then started a feud with the newly formed team of Jeff Hardy and Mr. Anderson, known collectively as The Enigmatic Assholes, who would go on to defeat them at Slammiversary VIII. On the following episode of Impact! Ric Flair, who had aligned himself with Beer Money, A.J. Styles, Desmond Wolfe and Kazarian, announced that he would reform the Four Horsemen under the new name Fourtune, stating that each of them would have to earn their spots in the group and that in order for Roode and Storm to earn their spots, they needed to become the Ole Anderson and Tully Blanchard of the group. After the TNA World Tag Team Championship was vacated in June, Beer Money entered a four–team, two–week-long tournament to decide who would get to face The Motor City Machine Guns for the titles at Victory Road. Beer Money advanced to the title match at the pay-per-view by defeating Team 3D and Ink Inc. (Jesse Neal and Shannon Moore). At Victory Road Beer Money was defeated by the Motor City Machine Guns in the match for the World Tag Team Championship.

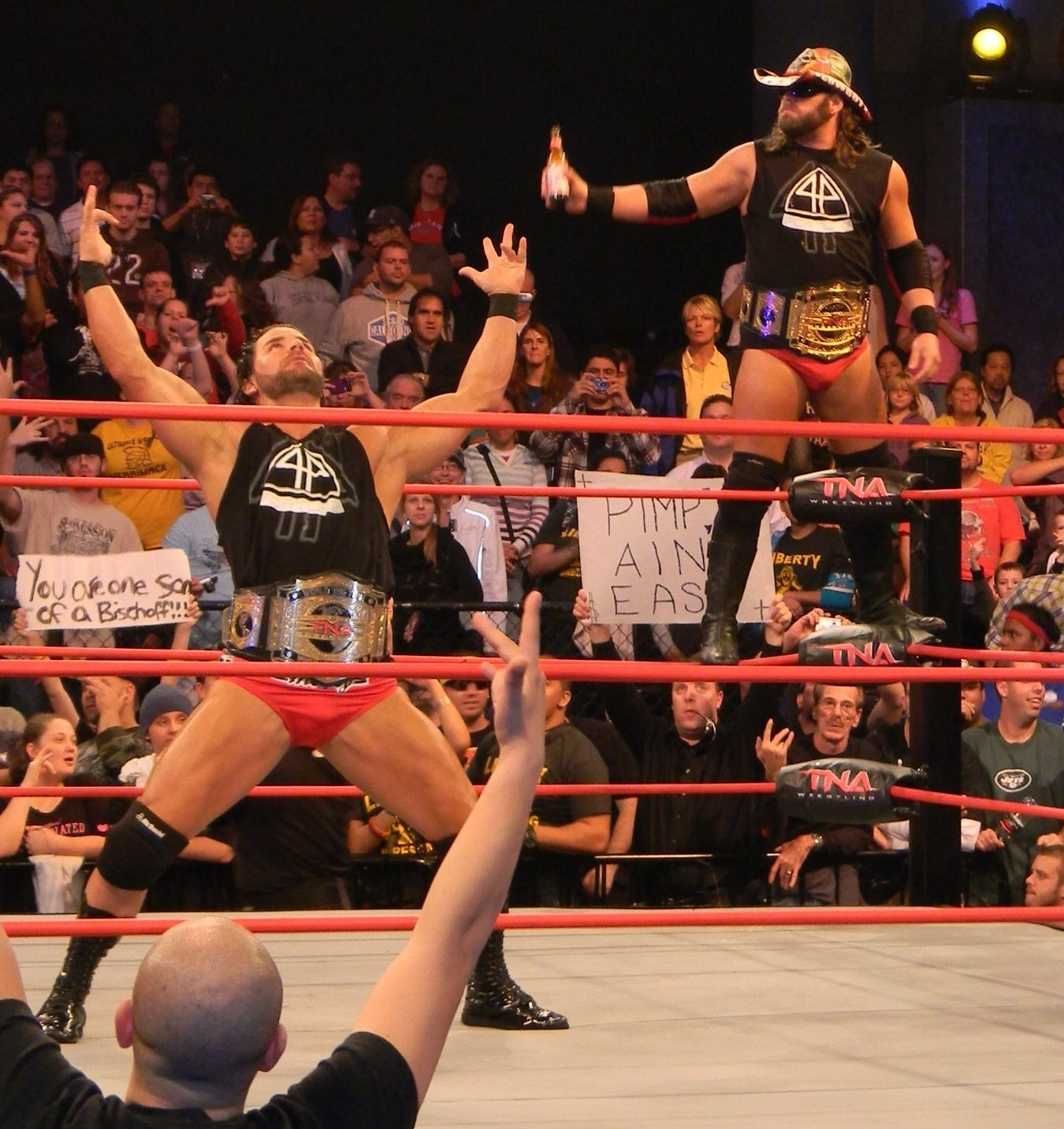
Beer Money, Inc. as the TNA World Tag Team Champions in January 2011.

After Victory Road Beer Money entered a Best of Five Series with the Motor City Machine Guns, contested for the TNA World Tag Team Championship. Beer Money won the first two matches, a ladder match and a Street Fight, after knocking their opponents out with beer bottles. On the July 29 episode of Impact!, Ric Flair announced that Roode and Storm, who were just one victory away from becoming four–time TNA World Tag Team Champions, had earned the right to join himself, Styles and Kazarian to become the final two members of Fourtune. However, Shelley and Sabin came back to win the two following matches in the Best of Five Series, a steel cage match and an Ultimate X match, to even the score to 2–2 and set up a deciding match for the August 12 episode of Impact!. On the August 12 episode of Impact! Beer Money, Inc. was defeated in a Two Out of Three Falls match and as a result lost the Best of Five Series 2–3. Later that night Douglas Williams and Matt Morgan were added to Fourtune, as the stable attacked EV 2.0, a stable consisting of former Extreme Championship Wrestling performers. In the weeks leading to Bound for Glory, the stable's name was tweaked to Fortune to represent the expansion in the number of members in the group. At Bound for Glory Roode, Storm, Styles, Kazarian and Morgan were defeated in a Lethal Lockdown match by EV 2.0 members Tommy Dreamer, Raven, Rhino, Sabu and Stevie Richards, ending the feud between the two factions. On the following episode of Impact! Fortune formed an alliance with Hulk Hogan's and Eric Bischoff's new stable, Immortal. At Turning Point Fortune defeated EV 2.0 in a ten-man tag team match and, as a result, EV 2.0's Sabu was released from TNA. The following month at Final Resolution, Beer Money, Inc. returned to the TNA World Tag Team Championship picture by defeating Ink Inc. in a number one contender's match. On January 9, 2011, at Genesis, Beer Money, Inc. defeated the Motor City Machine Guns to win the TNA World Tag Team Championship for the fourth time.

On January 31 at the tapings of the February 3 episode of Impact!, Fortune turned face by attacking Immortal, when they interfered in a TNA World Heavyweight Championship match between Mr. Anderson and Jeff Hardy. Ric Flair, who did not take part in Fortune's turn due to being out with a torn rotator cuff, returned at the February 14 tapings of the February 17 episode of Impact!, turning on Fortune and jumping to Immortal. On April 17 at Lockdown, Roode, Storm, Kazarian and Christopher Daniels, who replaced an injured A.J. Styles, defeated Immortal representatives Ric Flair, Abyss, Bully Ray and Matt Hardy in a Lethal Lockdown match. In early May, Roode returned to using the first name Bobby, which he had previously used during his days as a member of Team Canada. On May 15 at Sacrifice, Beer Money, Inc. successfully defended the TNA World Tag Team Championship against Immortal representatives Matt Hardy and Chris Harris, Storm's old tag team partner who had made his surprise return to TNA on the previous episode of Impact!. On the following episode of Impact Wrestling, Immortal assaulted Roode, sidelining him with a storyline shoulder injury. Two weeks later, Eric Bischoff attempted to strip Beer Money, Inc. of their TNA World Tag Team Championship due to Roode's injury, but was interrupted by the champions' former rival Alex Shelley, who agreed to take Roode's spot in the title defense against the British Invasion at Slammiversary IX. At the pay-per-view, Storm and Shelley were successful in their title defense. Roode made his in-ring return on the June 23 episode of Impact Wrestling, in a tag team match, where he and Storm were defeated by Crimson and Matt Morgan. On July 13, Beer Money, Inc. became the longest reigning TNA World Tag Team Champions in the title's history, breaking the previous record of 184 days set by A.J. Styles and Tomko in 2007. On August 7 at Hardcore Justice, Beer Money, Inc. successfully defended the TNA World Tag Team Championship against Mexican America (Anarquia and Hernandez). Two days later, at the tapings of the August 18 episode of Impact Wrestling, Mexican America defeated Beer Money, Inc. in a rematch, following interference from Jeff Jarrett, to win the TNA World Tag Team Championship, ending Roode's and Storm's record-setting reign at 212 days.

==== Bound for Glory Series and split (2011) ====
From June to September, Roode and Storm were two of the twelve participants in the Bound for Glory Series to determine the number one contender to the TNA World Heavyweight Championship. When the group stage of the tournament concluded, both of them finished in the top four and thus advanced to the finals at No Surrender along with Immortal members Bully Ray and Gunner. On September 11 at No Surrender, Storm was eliminated from the tournament after losing to Ray via disqualification. Meanwhile, Roode defeated Gunner via submission to set up a tiebreaker match against Ray later in the event, in which Roode managed to pick up the win via pinfall to become the number one contender to the TNA World Heavyweight Championship at Bound for Glory. On October 16 at Bound for Glory, Roode failed in his attempt to win the TNA World Heavyweight Championship when he was pinned by Kurt Angle, after the referee failed to notice his arm under the ropes or Angle using the ropes for leverage. On the following episode of Impact Wrestling, after it was revealed that Roode was not eligible for a rematch with Angle, new authority figure Sting gave the next title shot to James Storm, who then went on to defeat Angle to win the TNA World Heavyweight Championship for the first time. On the November 3 episode of Impact Wrestling, Roode defeated Storm to win the TNA World Heavyweight Championship, after hitting him with his own beer bottle, dissolving Beer Money, Inc.

==== Occasional teaming (2013–2014) ====
Storm and Roode reunited for the first time in two years on December 4, 2013 (aired January 2, 2014) at Impact Wrestling. Beer Money defeated Kurt Angle and Gunner.

On February 2, Roode and Storm appeared as Beer Money in the TNA One Night Only Joker's Wild, where they were beaten by The Wolves.

==== Reunion (2016) ====
On January 5, 2016, on TNA's debut on Pop, James Storm returned to TNA to help Bobby Roode fight off Eric Young and Bram. After Storm told Roode he wanted to "get back to having fun". Storm handed Roode a beer officially reuniting Beer Money, Inc. On the January 26, 2016 edition of Impact Wrestling, Storm won feast or fired briefcase for future World Tag Team Championship. On February 9, 2016, Beer Money attempted to cash in their title shot against current champions the Wolves, however in their attempt to cash in, The Decay stopped them and mysteriously asked them to join their path of Decay. They eventually challenged the group to a match, but it ended in disqualification when Abyss pulled the referee out of the ring and began choking him. After the match Crazzy Steve lowblowed Roode. On the March 8, 2016, Beer Money officially cashed in Feast or Fired contract and defeated The Wolves to win the title.

On March 19, 2016, Impact Wrestling tapings, Decay defeated Beer Money to win the TNA World Tag Team Championship. After this, Bobby Roode left TNA, disbanding the team.

=== Other promotions (2009–2011) ===
On February 15, 2009, Beer Money, Inc. made their debut for New Japan Pro-Wrestling, defeating the team of Akira and Masahiro Chono at the Sumo Hall in Tokyo, Japan.

On May 29, 2010, Beer Money, Inc. made their debut for British professional wrestling promotion One Pro Wrestling (1PW), challenging Fight Club (Kid Fite and Liam Thomson) for the 1PW Tag Team Championship and winning the match via disqualification, which meant that Fite and Thomson retained their titles. On June 6, 2010, Beer Money, Inc. participated in the Mexican wrestling promotion AAA's Triplemanía XVIII event. The team competed in a 4-way elimination match for the AAA World Tag Team Championship and outlasted both then champions Atsushi Aoki and Go Shiozaki as well as former champions La Hermandad 187 (Joe Líder and Nicho el Millonario), but were defeated by Los Maniacos (Silver Cain and Último Gladiador), who won the championship. The match was a result of a working relationship between TNA and AAA. On October 12, 2010, New Japan Pro Wrestling announced that Beer Money, Inc. would return to the promotion on October 22. In their match Roode and Storm defeated IWGP Tag Team Champions, Bad Intentions (Giant Bernard and Karl Anderson), in a non–title match. The following day Beer Money, Inc. continued their undefeated streak in Japan, by defeating No Limit (Tetsuya Naito and Yujiro Takahashi). Beer Money, Inc. returned to New Japan on January 4, 2011, at Wrestle Kingdom V in Tokyo Dome, where they unsuccessfully challenged Bad Intentions for the IWGP Tag Team Championship in a three-way match, which also included Muscle Orchestra (Manabu Nakanishi and Strong Man).

== Championships and accomplishments ==
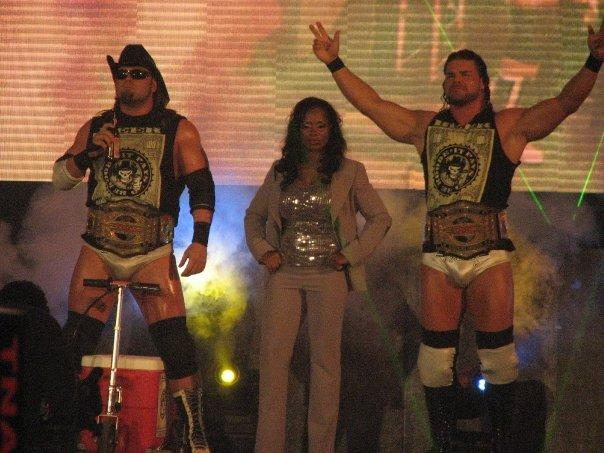
Beer Money, Inc. at Final Resolution.

- The Baltimore Sun
  - Tag Team of the Year (2009)
- Canadian Pro-Wrestling Hall of Fame
  - Class of 2023
- Pro Wrestling Illustrated
  - Tag Team of the Year (2008, 2011)
- Total Nonstop Action Wrestling
  - TNA King of the Mountain Championship (1 time) – Roode
  - TNA World Heavyweight Championship (1 time) – Storm
  - TNA World Tag Team Championship (5 times)
  - Team 3D Invitational Tag Team Tournament (2009)
  - TNA Tag Team Championship Series (2010)
  - Bound for Glory Series (2011) – Roode
  - Feast or Fired (2016 – World Tag Team Championship contract) – Storm

== See also ==
- America's Most Wanted (professional wrestling)
- Fortune (professional wrestling)
- Immortal (professional wrestling)
