= Rising Above (2007) =

Professional wrestling pay-per-view event

- Promotional poster featuring Nigel McGuinness
- Promotion: Ring of Honor
- Date: December 29, 2007 (aired March 7, 2008)
- City: New York, New York
- Venue: Manhattan Center
- Attendance: 1,200

Pay-per-view chronology
← Previous; Undeniable	Next → Take No Prisoners

Rising Above chronology
← Previous; First	Next → 2008

Rising Above (2007) was the inaugural Rising Above professional wrestling pay-per-view (PPV) event promoted by Ring of Honor. It took place on December 29, 2007, from the Manhattan Center in New York, New York and first aired on March 7, 2008.

== Storylines ==
Other on-screen personnel
Role	Name
Commentators	Dave Prazak
Commentators	Lenny Leonard

Rising Above featured storylines and professional wrestling matches that involved different wrestlers from pre-existing scripted feuds and storylines. Storylines were produced on ROH's weekly television programme Ring of Honor Wrestling.

== Results ==
No.	Results	Stipulations	Times
1	Daizee Haze defeated Lacey and Sara Del Rey	Women of Honor Three-way match	6:26
2	Delirious defeated Brent Albright (with Adam Pearce)	Singles match	6:11
3	Kevin Steen and El Generico defeated The Age of the Fall (Jimmy Jacobs and Tyler Black) (with Lacey), The Hangmen 3 (Adam Pearce and B. J. Whitmer), and The Vulture Squad (Jack Evans and Ruckus) (with Julius Smokes)	Tag team scramble match	7:31
4	Davey Richards defeated Erick Stevens by submission	Singles match	9:52
5	Claudio Castagnoli defeated Chris Hero (with Larry Sweeney, Tank Toland and Bobby Dempsey)	Singles match	9:20
6	Nigel McGuinness (c) defeated Austin Aries	Singles match for the ROH World Championship	23:16
7^{D}	Necro Butcher defeated Jigsaw, Matt Cross and Mitch Franklin	Four Way Fray	—
8	Bryan Danielson defeated Takeshi Morishima by disqualification	Singles match	8:20
9	The Briscoe Brothers (Jay and Mark Briscoe) (c) defeated No Remorse Corps (Roderick Strong and Rocky Romero)	Two out of three falls match for the ROH World Tag Team Championship	21:45
10^{D}	Naomichi Marufuji defeated Claudio Castagnoli	Singles match	—
(c) / – the champion(s) heading into the match; D / – this was a dark match

== See also ==
- 2007 in professional wrestling
- List of Ring of Honor pay-per-view events
