= TNA Lockdown (2010) =

2010 Total Nonstop Action Wrestling pay-per-view event

Lockdown (2010)
- Promotional poster featuring Mr. Anderson, AJ Styles, Ric Flair, Hulk Hogan, Kurt Angle, and D'Angelo Dinero
- Promotion: Total Nonstop Action Wrestling
- Date: April 18, 2010
- City: Saint Charles, Missouri
- Venue: Family Arena
- Attendance: 3,023
- Tagline: Every Match Inside the Steel Cage

Pay-per-view chronology
← Previous; Destination X	Next → Sacrifice

Lockdown chronology
← Previous; 2009	Next → 2011

The 2010 Lockdown was a professional wrestling pay-per-view (PPV) event produced by the Total Nonstop Action Wrestling (TNA) promotion, which took place on April 18, 2010 at the Family Arena in Saint Charles, Missouri. It was the sixth event under the Lockdown chronology and the fourth event of the 2010 TNA PPV schedule. As per the theme of Lockdown events, every match took place inside a steel cage. It was the first Lockdown event with a four-sided steel cage.

In October 2017, with the launch of the Global Wrestling Network, the event became available to stream on demand.

== Production ==
Other on-screen personnel
Commentators	Mike Tenay
Commentators	Taz
Ring announcer	Jeremy Borash
Referee	Earl Hebner
Referee	Brian Hebner
Referee	Brian Stiffler

=== Background ===
The sixth installment to the Lockdown PPV chronology was first announced in a press release on January 16, 2010, regarding the February Against All Odds PPV event. The date and area of the event was not announced until February 4, 2010, when another press release proclaimed that it would take place on April 18, 2010, at the Family Arena in Saint Charles, Missouri. A tradition of the series is that all encounters take place inside a steel cage which will be continued. On January 17, 2010, at their Genesis PPV event, TNA discontinued the use of a six sided ring, with a four sided ring being used instead. That made the 2010 edition the first Lockdown to feature the traditional four-sided cage.

=== Storylines ===
Lockdown featured nine professional wrestling matches that involved different wrestlers from pre-existing scripted feuds and storylines. Wrestlers portrayed villains, heroes, or less distinguishable characters in the scripted events that built tension and culminated in a wrestling match or series of matches.

The headline match for the Lockdown event featured the TNA World Heavyweight Champion A.J. Styles defending his title against D'Angelo Dinero, who, at Against All Odds, won the opportunity to challenge for the title.

At the beginning of the show it was announced that X Division Champion Douglas Williams was unable to get to St Louis due to the massive flight cancellations worldwide and was therefore stripped of the title. The Motor City Machine Guns' match with Brian Kendrick and Homicide was changed to a four-man Xscape match, in which the winner would replace Williams in the X Division Title Match. Homicide was victorious, but was unable to capture the gold.

It was also announced that Syxx-Pac had no-showed the event and would not compete in his scheduled match teaming with Scott Hall to take on Team 3D. Later in the night it was announced that Hall needed to find a partner, or go into a handicap match against Team 3D. At the conclusion of Kevin Nash's match he announced he would replace Syxx-Pac as Hall's tag partner. It was later revealed that the Missouri Athletic Commission had barred Waltman from wrestling as he had tested positive for hepatitis C.

== Aftermath ==
The night after Lockdown, Rob Van Dam defeated AJ Styles to win the TNA World Heavyweight Championship. A rematch would take place at Sacrifice, with Van Dam defeating Styles to retain the title.

After turning heel at Lockdown, Tara teamed up with the babyface duo of Sarita and Taylor Wilde in a losing effort against The Beautiful People in a match for all of the Knockouts championships. Tara later challenged Madison Rayne to a Title vs Career match at Sacrifice, which Rayne won to retain the title and end Tara's career. However, Tara would return at Victory Road and continue her status as a villainess by aligning with Rayne.

== Results ==
No.	Results	Stipulations	Times
1	Rob Van Dam defeated James Storm	Steel Cage match	06:40
2	Homicide defeated Alex Shelley, Brian Kendrick and Chris Sabin	Xscape match to determine Douglas Williams replacement in the TNA X Division Championship match	04:58
3	Kevin Nash defeated Eric Young	Steel Cage match	04:50
4	The Beautiful People (Madison Rayne and Velvet Sky) (c) (with Lacey Von Erich) defeated Angelina Love (c) and Tara	Steel Cage match for the TNA Knockout and TNA Knockouts Tag Team Championships (Since Madison Rayne pinned Tara, she became the Knockouts champion)	05:10
5	Kazarian defeated Homicide and Shannon Moore	Steel Cage match for the vacant TNA X Division Championship	09:07
6	Team 3D (Brother Devon and Brother Ray) defeated The Band (Kevin Nash and Scott Hall)	Falls Count Anywhere Street Fight Steel Cage match	06:45
7	Kurt Angle defeated Mr. Anderson	Steel Cage match	20:55
8	AJ Styles (c) (with Ric Flair) defeated D'Angelo Dinero	Steel Cage match for the TNA World Heavyweight Championship	15:43
9	Team Hogan (Abyss, Jeff Hardy, Jeff Jarrett and Rob Van Dam) defeated Team Flair (Desmond Wolfe, James Storm, Robert Roode, and Sting)	Lethal Lockdown match	30:15
(c) / – the champion(s) heading into the match
