= Slammiversary VIII =

2010 Total Nonstop Action Wrestling pay-per-view event

- Promotional poster featuring Sting and Rob Van Dam
- Promotion: Total Nonstop Action Wrestling
- Date: June 13, 2010
- City: Orlando, Florida
- Venue: TNA Impact Zone
- Attendance: 1,100
- Tagline(s): The Biggest Pay Per View Of The Summer

Pay-per-view chronology
← Previous; Sacrifice	Next → Victory Road

Slammiversary chronology
← Previous; Seven	Next → IX

Slammiversary VIII was a professional wrestling pay-per-view event produced by Total Nonstop Action Wrestling (TNA), which took place on June 13, 2010 at the TNA Impact! Zone in Orlando, Florida. It was the sixth event under the Slammiversary chronology.

This was the first time since 2006 that Slammiversary was held at the Impact! Zone, and the first time that a King of the Mountain match did not take place.

The main event was between Rob Van Dam and Sting for the TNA World Heavyweight Championship in which Van Dam retain his title. Matches on the undercard featured The Enigmatic Assholes (Jeff Hardy and Mr. Anderson) defeated Beer Money, Inc. (James Storm and Robert Roode) in a tag team match, Jay Lethal defeated A.J. Styles, and Abyss defeated Desmond Wolfe in a Monster's Ball match. The event saw the TNA debut of Tommy Dreamer, during the event.

In October 2017, with the launch of the Global Wrestling Network, the event became available to stream on demand.

== Storylines ==
Other on-screen personnel
Commentators	Mike Tenay
Commentators	Taz
Ring announcer	Jeremy Borash
Referee	Earl Hebner
Referee	Brian Hebner
Referee	Brian Stiffler

Slammiversary VIII featured nine professional wrestling matches that involved different wrestlers from pre-existing scripted feuds and storylines. Wrestlers are portrayed as villains, heroes or less distinguishable characters in the scripted events that build tension and culminate into a wrestling match or series of matches.

On the May 20 edition of TNA Impact! Sting was ranked number one in the first Top 10 ranking by the TNA Championship Committee and was as a result given a shot at the TNA World Heavyweight Championship at Slammiversary.

On June 10, Dixie Carter said on Twitter she would have a big surprise at Slammiversary that would ultimately change TNA forever. Also using Twitter, she later clarified her statement to indicate that while there will be a surprise revealed at Slammiversary, it will not be the one said to "change TNA forever," which will instead be revealed in the coming weeks. It was soon known that Tommy Dreamer was the surprise after making his debut at the TNA Wrestling Pay-per-view event.

== Results ==
No.	Results	Stipulations	Times
1	Kurt Angle defeated Kazarian	Singles match	14:15
2	Douglas Williams (c) defeated Brian Kendrick	Singles match for the TNA X Division Championship	09:33
3	Madison Rayne (c) defeated Roxxi	Title vs. Career match for the TNA Women's Knockout Championship	04:42
4	Jesse Neal defeated Brother Ray	Singles match	05:51
5	Matt Morgan defeated Hernandez via disqualification	Singles match	05:18
6	Abyss defeated Desmond Wolfe (with Chelsea)	Monster's Ball match	11:45
7	Jay Lethal defeated A.J. Styles (with Ric Flair)	Singles match	16:45
8	Jeff Hardy and Mr. Anderson defeated Beer Money, Inc. (James Storm and Robert Roode)	Tag team match	13:55
9	Rob Van Dam (c) defeated Sting	Singles match for the TNA World Heavyweight Championship	10:58
(c) / – the champion(s) heading into the match
