= Victory Road (2010) =

2010 Total Nonstop Action Wrestling pay-per-view event

- Promotional poster featuring Kurt Angle
- Promotion: Total Nonstop Action Wrestling
- Date: July 11, 2010
- City: Orlando, Florida
- Venue: TNA Impact! Zone
- Attendance: 1,100

Pay-per-view chronology
| ← Previous; Slammiversary VIII | Next → Hardcore Justice |

Victory Road chronology
| ← Previous; 2009 | Next → 2011 |

The 2010 Victory Road was a professional wrestling pay-per-view event produced by Total Nonstop Action Wrestling (TNA), which took place on July 11, 2010 at the TNA Impact! Zone in Orlando, Florida. It was the sixth event under the Victory Road chronology and the seventh event of the 2010 TNA PPV schedule.

In October 2017, with the launch of the Global Wrestling Network, the event became available to stream on demand.

== Storylines ==
Other on-screen personnel
| Commentators | Mike Tenay |
| Commentators | Taz |
| Ring announcer | Jeremy Borash |
| Referee | Earl Hebner |
| Referee | Brian Hebner |
| Referee | Brian Stiffler |

Victory Road featured nine professional wrestling matches that involved different wrestlers from pre-existing scripted feuds and storylines. Wrestlers portrayed villains, heroes, or less distinguishable characters in the scripted events that built tension and culminated in a wrestling match or series of matches.

== Results ==
| No. | Results | Stipulations | Times |
|---|---|---|---|
| 1 | Douglas Williams (c) defeated Brian Kendrick | Submission match for the TNA X Division Championship | 10:08 |
| 2 | Brother Ray defeated Brother Devon and Jesse Neal | Three-Way Dance | 06:01 |
| 3 | Angelina Love defeated Madison Rayne (c) by disqualification (Note: Per the pre-match stipulation, if any member of The Beautiful People interfered on Rayne's behalf, she would forfeit the match and her title. A woman in biker gear interfered on Rayne's behalf, and the referee could not verify her identity, so awarded Love the match. The title change was reversed on Impact, and the interfering woman was revealed to be Tara.) | Title vs. Career match for the TNA Knockouts Championship | 04:43 |
| 4 | Fortune (A.J. Styles and Kazarian) defeated Rob Terry and Samoa Joe | Tag team match | 08:12 |
| 5 | Hernandez defeated Matt Morgan | Steel Cage match | 10:52 |
| 6 | Jay Lethal defeated Ric Flair | Singles match | 12:06 |
| 7 | The Motor City Machine Guns (Alex Shelley and Chris Sabin) defeated Beer Money, Inc. (James Storm and Robert Roode) | Tag team match for the vacant TNA World Tag Team Championship | 15:50 |
| 8 | Kurt Angle defeated D'Angelo Dinero | Career Threatening match | 12:10 |
| 9 | Rob Van Dam (c) defeated Abyss, Jeff Hardy and Mr. Anderson | Four-Way match for the TNA World Heavyweight Championship | 13:34 |
(c) / – the champion(s) heading into the match

=== Tournament bracket ===
Teams:

- The Band (Eric Young and Kevin Nash)
- Ink Inc. (Jesse Neal and Shannon Moore)
- Team 3D (Brother Ray and Brother Devon)
- Beer Money, Inc. (James Storm and Robert Roode)

Semifinals
The Band | Pin
Ink Inc. | 07:00
Team 3D | Pin
Beer Money, Inc. | 05:00

Finals
Ink Inc. | Pin
Beer Money, Inc. | 06:00
