= Rising Above (2008) =

Professional wrestling pay-per-view event

- Promotional poster featuring Bryan Danielson and Nigel McGuinness
- Promotion: Ring of Honor
- Date: November 22, 2008(taped); January 16, 2009 (aired)
- City: Chicago Ridge, Illinois
- Venue: Frontier Fieldhouse
- Attendance: 900

Pay-per-view chronology
← Previous; Driven	Next → Caged Collision

Rising Above chronology
← Previous; 2007	Next → Final

Rising Above (2008) was the second Rising Above professional wrestling pay-per-view (PPV) event produced by Ring of Honor. It took place on November 22, 2008, from the Frontier Fieldhouse in Chicago Ridge, Illinois. It aired on January 16, 2009.

== Production ==
=== Storylines ===
Other on-screen personnel
Role	Name
Commentators	Dave Prazak
Commentators	Lenny Leonard

Rising Above 2008 featured professional wrestling matches that involved different wrestlers working for the Ring of Honor promotion. It also involved a match for the Shimmer Championship, the top title in Ring of Honor's then sister promotion Shimmer Women Athletes.

The major feuds leading into the event were those between Austin Aries and Jimmy Jacobs and Nigel McGuinness and Bryan Danielson. Austin Aries and Jimmy Jacobs began feuding when Aries took Jacobs' kayfabe girlfriend Lacey away from him. The feud escalated to the point in which it was decided the pair would face each other in an "I Quit" Match. The Nigel McGuinness and Bryan Danielson feud largely revolved around their very competitive previous matches. The ROH World Champion Nigel McGuinness also resented the fact that Danielson was considered the 'best wrestler in the world' by many fans, despite the fact that he was the World Champion.

== Results ==
No.	Results	Stipulations	Times
1^{D}	The Phoenix Twins (Tweak Phoenix and Dash Phoenix) defeated Grizzly Redwood and Aaron Scott	Tag team match	—
2	Kevin Steen and El Generico (c) defeated The Briscoe Brothers (Jay Briscoe and Mark Briscoe)	Tag team match for the ROH World Tag Team Championship	06:39
3	MsChif (c) defeated Sara Del Rey (with Larry Sweeney)	Women of Honor Singles match for the Shimmer Championship	09:11
4^{D}	Delirious defeated Rhett Titus	Singles match	06:43
5	Claudio Castagnoli defeated Sami Callihan, Silas Young, and Alex Payne	Four-corner survival match	08:54
6	Sweet n' Sour, Inc.(Chris Hero, Go Shiozaki and Davey Richards) (with Larry Sweeney and Bobby Dempsey) defeated Roderick Strong, Brent Albright and Ace Steel	Six-man tag team match	16:15
7	Austin Aries (with Lacey) defeated Jimmy Jacobs (with Tyler Black)	"I Quit" match	22:08
8	Nigel McGuinness (c) defeated Bryan Danielson	Singles match for the ROH World Championship	28:16
9^{D}	Samoa Joe defeated Tyler Black	Singles match	18:56
(c) / – the champion(s) heading into the match; D / – this was a dark match

== See also ==
- 2008 in professional wrestling
- List of Ring of Honor pay-per-view events
