= Alison Skipper =

American actress

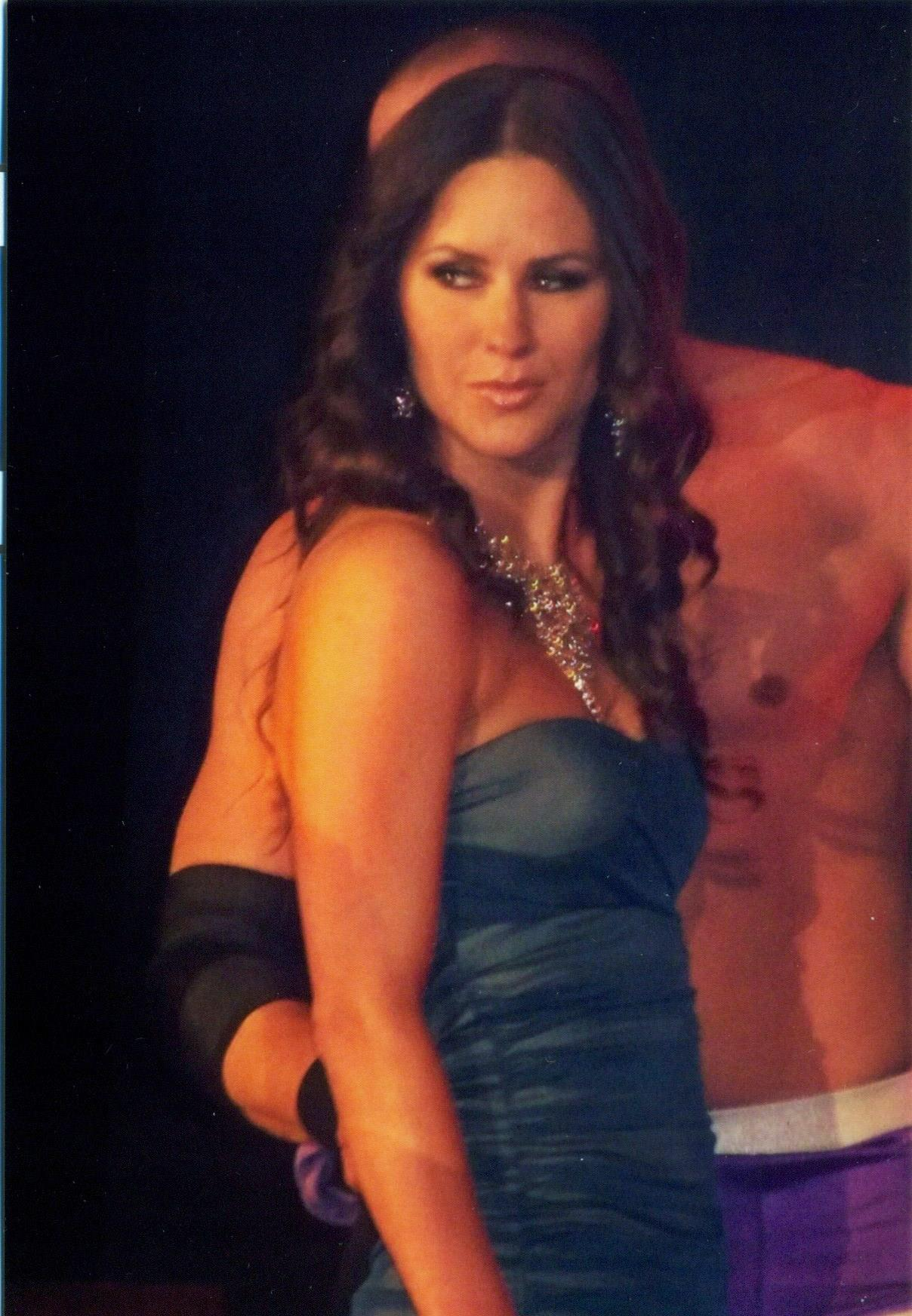
- Skipper as Chelsea in 2010

Personal information
- Born: Alison Marie Skipper; August 10, 1982 (age 44) Orlando, Florida, United States

Professional wrestling career
- Ring name: Chelsea
- Billed height: 5 ft 8 in (173 cm)
- Billed weight: 118 lb (54 kg)
- Debut: 2010
- Retired: 2010

Alison Skipper (born August 10, 1982), is an American actress, model, television personality, dancer, and former professional wrestling valet who is best known for her work with Total Nonstop Action Wrestling (TNA) as a valet under the ring name Chelsea. Outside of TNA, Skipper hosted "The College Experiment" on Fox Sports and appeared on the Home Shopping Network. Skipper opened a full service talent agency, Professionally Pretty Model & Talent Agency, with model and actress friend Jaycelle Coltman Veigle in 2012.

== Early life and career ==
Skipper was born in Orlando, Florida where she still resides and is now twice divorced. She attended the University of Central Florida. Skipper took up dancing and modeling at a young age. She has modeled for Lucky, Vogue, Hyatt Hotels, Breezes Resorts, Body Glove, Kumho Tires, Boost Mobile, Ron Jon Surf Shop, Nike, Victoria's Secret, Macy's and Nordstrom. She has also been featured in television commercials for Walt Disney World and Papa John's Pizza. Alison was a regular fashion & jewelry model for the Home Shopping Network (HSN), and hosted "The College Experiment" on Fox Sports from 2009 to 2011.

== Professional wrestling career ==
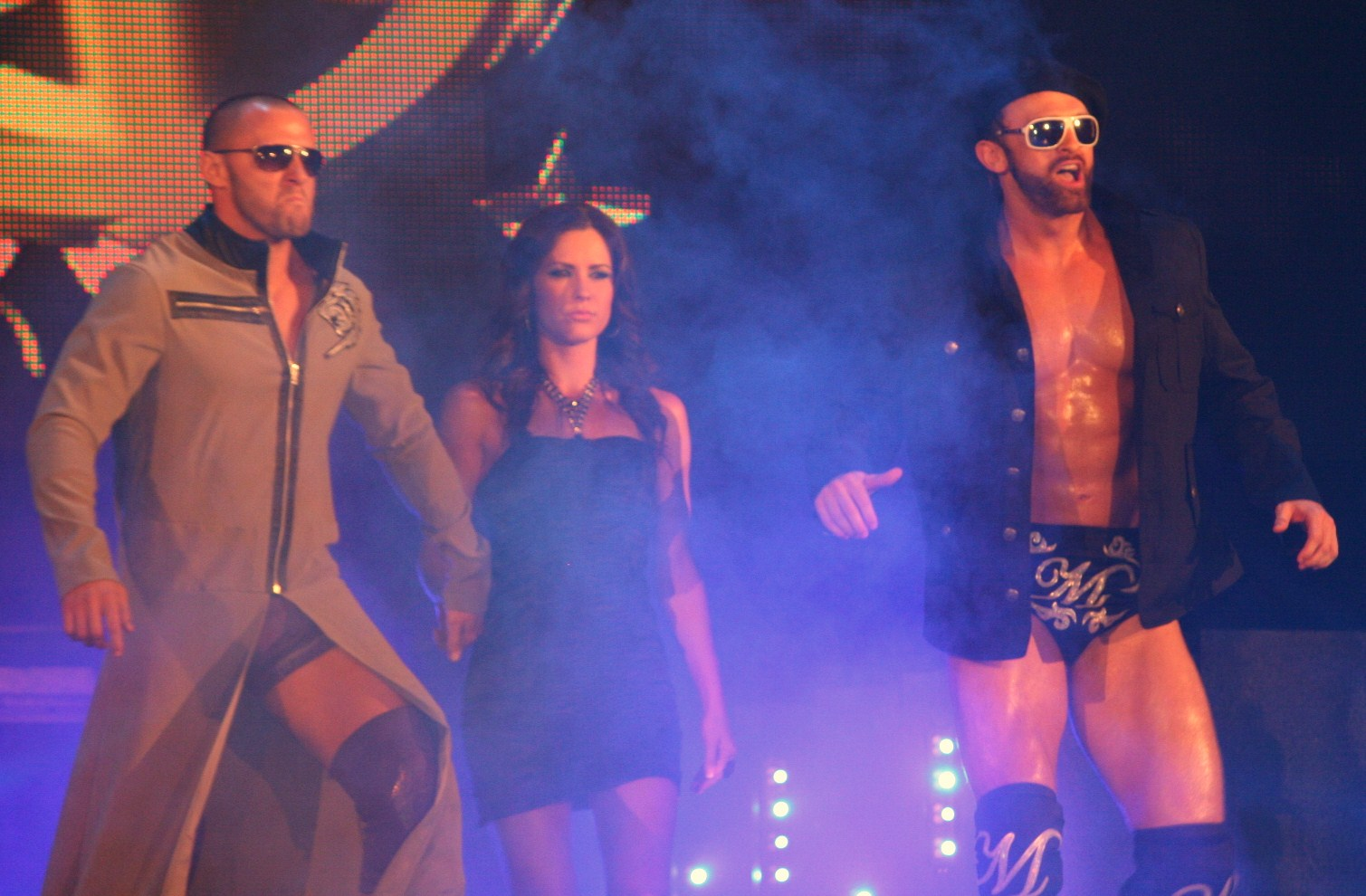
Chelsea (middle) managing Desmond Wolfe (left) and Magnus in 2010

Skipper signed with TNA Wrestling, and debuted under the name Chelsea during the Genesis pay-per-view January 17, 2010. She aligned herself with Desmond Wolfe at the event, where he defeated D'Angelo Dinero. She would continue to appear accompany Wolfe to the ring as he feuded with D'Angelo Dinero, at times even helping him cheat to win matches.

Wolfe later began a feud with Abyss, after Chelsea said she wanted the hall-of-fame ring Abyss won from Ric Flair. Chelsea accused Abyss of assault and he was arrested, she later acknowledged that she had planned with Wolfe to falsely accuse him. Wolfe challenged Abyss to a match at TNA Sacrifice (2010); if Wolfe won, he got the hall-of-fame ring, but if Abyss won, he would win Chelsea's services for 30 days. On the following edition of Impact!, Chelsea started showing sympathy towards Abyss, when he was being brutalized by Wolfe. The following month at Slammiversary VIII, Wolfe was defeated by Abyss in a Monster's Ball match, when Chelsea turned on him and helped Abyss pick up the victory. On the June 17, 2010 episode of Impact! Chelsea reluctantly returned to Wolfe after her 30 days with Abyss were up, and Wolfe gave her a chance to redeem herself, but her behaviour outside the ring provided a distraction which cost Wolfe his match against Flair's nemesis Jay Lethal for a spot in Flair's stable Fourtune.

After failing to make it into Fourtune, Wolfe went on to form a tag team with fellow Briton Magnus and together the two were named London Brawling, a team that was managed by Chelsea. The team earned themselves the right to challenge for the TNA World Tag Team Championship, and were scheduled to receive their shot against then-champions The Motor City Machine Guns (Alex Shelley and Chris Sabin) at No Surrender, but were at the last minute pulled from the event, with TNA citing a "personal issue" as the reason. It was later reported that Wolfe was pulled from the event due to an undisclosed medical condition that would sideline him for the next few months, with Wolfe later revealing that at this time, he tested positive for Hepatitis B. On-screen, his absence was explained by Magnus, who claimed that in an attempt to become a dual athlete, Wolfe had travelled to London to try out for Chelsea F.C. During this team, Chelsea was written off on 16 December episode of Impact!, where Magnus met his former tag team partner Doug Williams and informed him that Wolfe was now done with Chelsea (the football club) and would be coming back soon, while also telling him that in the meantime they had gotten rid of Chelsea (their manager) too. On February 9, 2011, it was reported that Skipper had been released by TNA.
