= Nigel McGuinness =

British professional wrestler

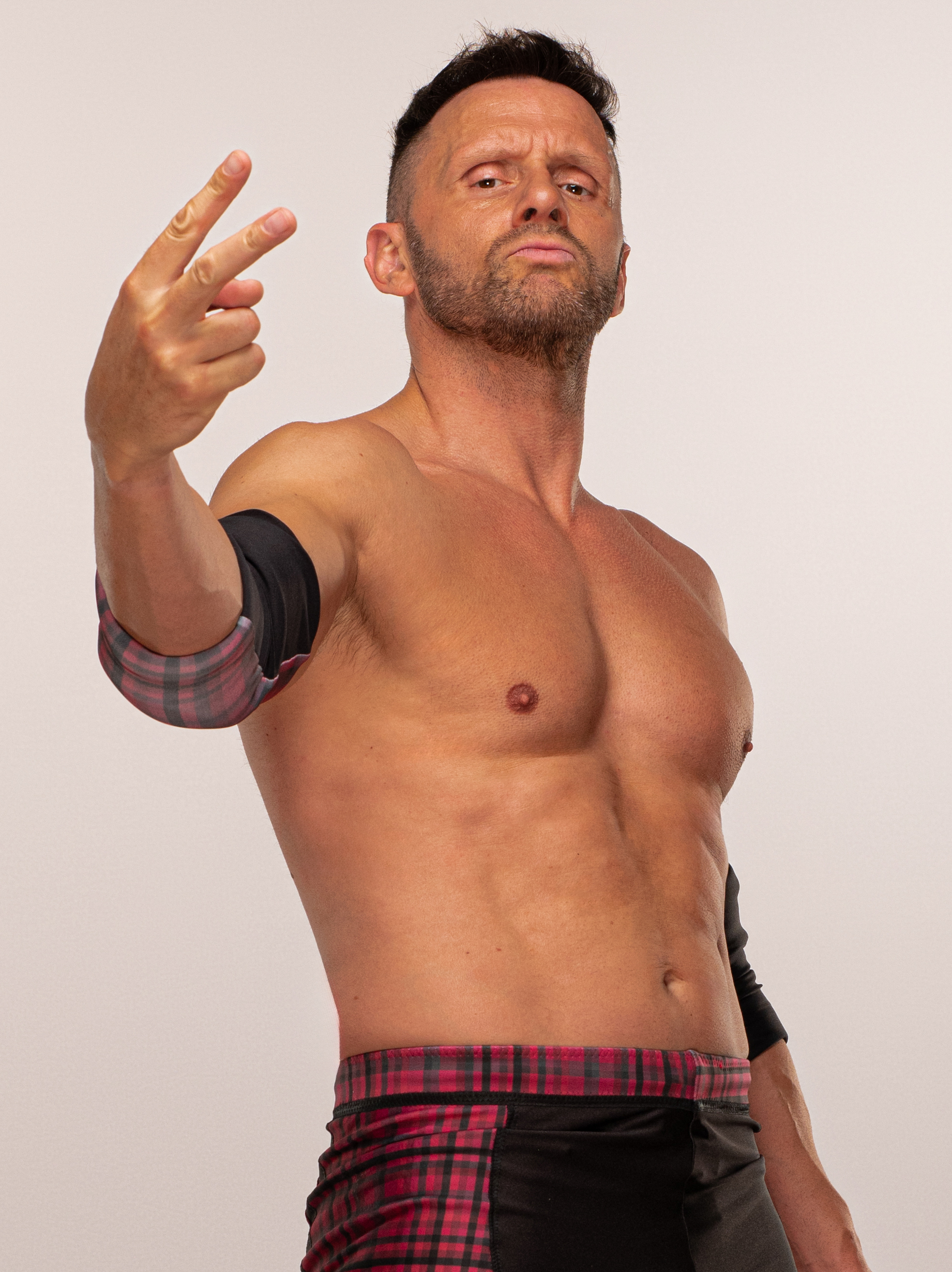
- McGuinness in 2024

Personal information
- Born: Steven Haworth; 23 January 1976 (age 50) London, England
- Education: University of Leicester
- Children: 2

Professional wrestling career
- Ring name(s): Desmond Wolfe; Nigel McGuinness; Vyvyan Edmondson; Kane
- Billed height: 6 ft 3 in (191 cm)
- Billed weight: 211 lb (96 kg)
- Billed from: London, England
- Trained by: Chic Cullen; Dave Taylor; Les Thatcher; Robbie Brookside
- Debut: September 1999

Steven Haworth (born 23 January 1976), better known by his ring name Nigel McGuinness, is an English professional wrestler, sports commentator and magician. He is signed to All Elite Wrestling (AEW), where he serves as a colour commentator on Collision and an occasional in-ring talent. He is known for work with Ring of Honor (ROH), Total Nonstop Action Wrestling (TNA), Pro Wrestling Noah and WWE.

Haworth started his career in 1999 in the American independent circuit as Nigel McGuinness before signing with ROH in 2003. In 2005, he won the ROH Pure Championship and held it for a then-record 350 days (before it was eclipsed by Lee Moriarty's reign in 2025). He also won the ROH World Championship in 2007 and held the title for 545 days. In 2009, Haworth worked with TNA under the ring name Desmond Wolfe until his in-ring retirement in 2011 due to medical complications. He returned to ROH in August 2011 as a colour commentator and on-screen authority figure, but left in December 2016 and signed with WWE shortly after, working as a commentator for NXT and NXT UK. After his departure from WWE in October 2022, he signed with AEW in April 2023 as a commentator and returned to in-ring competition in August 2024.

== Early life ==
Steven Haworth was born in London on 23 January 1976. He grew up in Staplehurst, Kent, where he attended Maidstone Grammar School. He was a wrestling fan from the age of 12, particularly enjoying The Hart Foundation and The British Bulldogs, and attended SummerSlam in 1992 while wearing Ultimate Warrior face paint. He studied at the University of Leicester in the 1990s and spent a sandwich year at Kent State University in Kent, Ohio, graduating in 1997 with a 2:1 degree in chemistry.

== Professional wrestling career ==
=== Heartland Wrestling Association (1998–2006) ===
In September 1998, Haworth began training under Les Thatcher in the Heartland Wrestling Association (HWA) in Cincinnati, Ohio, incurring large debts in the process. He debuted in September 1999 under the ring name "Nigel McGuinness", defeating GQ Masters III in a match that was featured on ABC's 20/20. He subsequently spent a year wrestling in the Midwestern United States. Haworth then returned to England, where he worked two full-time jobs to earn enough money to be able to return to the United States to wrestle and wrestled for All Star Wrestling promotions between September and December 2001, where he learned from wrestlers such as Robbie Brookside.

McGuinness developed a heel character which he described as "a punk rock soccer hooligan... Billy Idol meets Johnny Saint".

On 10 July 2001, McGuinness defeated Dean Jablonski in a singles match with the HWA Tag Team Championship on the line (the co-holder of the title, Chet Jablonski, was indisposed), claiming the title for himself and his partner, The Human Time Bomb. McGuinness and The Bomb held the title until 7 August, when the Jablonski brothers regained the title. McGuinness and The Bomb would become champions for a second time on 23 July 2002, defeating the Jablonski brothers once more. They lost the title to Southern Breeze later that year.

In 2003, McGuinness introduced the HWA European Championship to HWA. He held the title until 30 September 2003, when he lost to Hoss. He regained the title on 4 November and promptly retired it.

McGuinness won the HWA Heavyweight Championship on 6 September 2003 in Batavia, Ohio, defeating Chad Collyer, He held the title until 3 January 2004, when he lost the title to Hoss. McGuinness defeated Hoss to begin a second reign with the title on 6 January, and held it until 17 March 2004, when he lost to El Temor.

=== Ring of Honor (2003–2009) ===
==== Pure Champion (2003–2006) ====
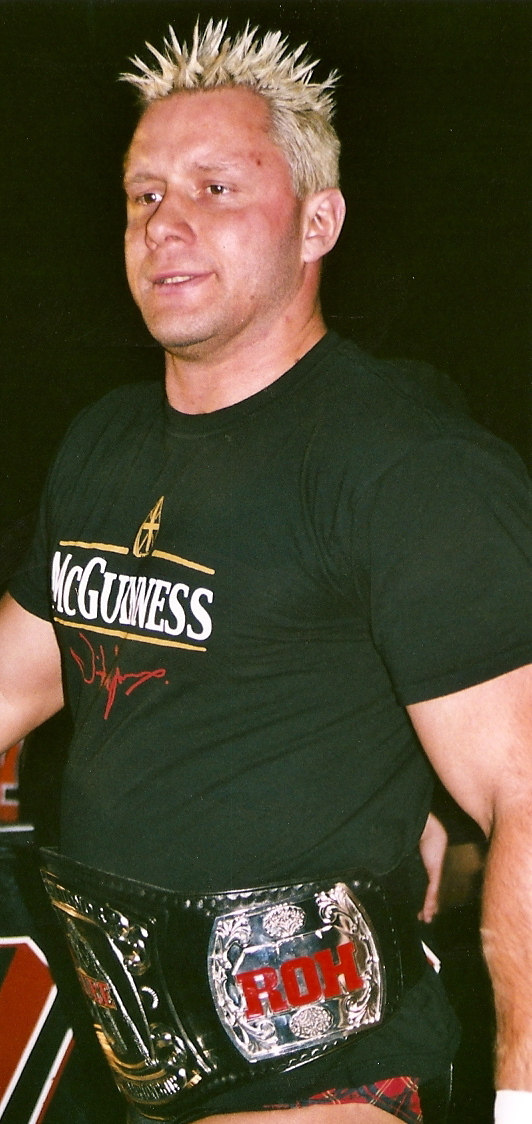
McGuinness as the ROH Pure Champion in November 2007

McGuinness debuted in Ring of Honor (ROH) on 9 August 2003, defeating Chet Jablonski. He wrestled for ROH throughout 2004, but had limited success. In March 2005, McGuinness and Colt Cabana teamed together to challenge for the ROH Tag Team Championship, but lost to the incumbents, Dan Maff and B. J. Whitmer. Cabana and McGuinness then began fighting one another, with McGuinness defeating Cabana on 7 May 2005, with an accidental low blow for a shot at the ROH Pure Championship. He challenged the champion, Samoa Joe, on 12 June 2005, but was defeated. He faced Joe once more on 27 August, and defeated him to win the Pure Championship.

After becoming champion, McGuinness turned heel and for several months was engaged in a feud with Claudio Castagnoli, instigated by a non-title match on 14 October where Castagnoli was able to use his knowledge of McGuinness's European wrestling style to score a pinfall on the champion. This led to a series of matches for the title, with McGuinness using underhanded tactics to avoid losing the championship belt. On 25 March 2006, McGuinness defeated Castagnoli in a match billed as the latter's last chance to win the championship as long as McGuinness was champion.

During his Pure Championship run, McGuinness regularly carried an iron (decorated with the Union Jack) to ringside. When asked, the typical story given was that a group of men once broke into his home to attack him, but he was able to defend himself with the iron. In reality, he began carrying the iron after a girlfriend's mother asked him why some wrestlers carried weapons to ringside, and then inquired as to whether anyone had ever carried an iron before. He would often use the iron as a weapon to win his matches.

McGuinness also had a malapropistic gimmick in ROH of mispronouncing words. An example would be at Survival of the Fittest 2005 in Dorchester, Massachusetts, when he said the fans appreciated him as much as "their beloved Boston Red Stockings".

During the rest of 2006, McGuinness was mostly uninvolved in the war between ROH and Combat Zone Wrestling (CZW), instead developing a new gimmick where he would win his matches by countout by using (often unfair) methods of preventing opponents from returning to the ring. McGuinness received a shot at the ROH World Championship against Bryan Danielson with his own Pure Championship on the line and contested under pure wrestling rules on 29 April. McGuinness again won by countout, by which only the Pure title could be won, but not Danielson's World title. The victory was enough to earn a rematch under regular rules on 29 July, in which Danielson narrowly managed to retain his title. A month later in Liverpool, England, ROH arranged a unification match between the two titles and guaranteed there would be a winner, with both titles able to change hands due to countout or disqualification under pure wrestling rules. McGuinness lost the match on 12 August and the Pure Championship was unified and retired. McGuinness reign of 350 days is the longest in the two-year history of the Pure Championship. After the match, Danielson offered McGuinness one more shot at the unified ROH World Championship and on 25 August the two of them wrestled a two-out-of-three-falls match to a 60-minute time limit and as a result McGuinness could no longer challenge for the title as long as Danielson was the champion. After the match, Danielson recognised McGuinness' efforts and gave him the now retired Pure Championship belt as a trophy.

==== Feud with Jimmy Rave and Chris Hero (2006–2007) ====
After losing the Pure Championship, McGuinness, now a face, challenged for Pro Wrestling Noah's GHC Heavyweight Championship on 16 September 2006, at ROH's Glory by Honor V – Night 2, but was defeated by the defending champion Naomichi Marufuji. The rest of the year saw McGuinness feuding with Jimmy Rave, who, using his new submission manoeuvre, the Heel Hook (a single leg Boston crab and twisting ankle lock combination), forced him to tap out on two separate occasions, first on 8 December 2006, at The Chicago Spectacular Night 1 and then on 23 December 2006, at Final Battle 2006. Rave followed that up with another victory over McGuinness on 27 January 2007, this time in an "I Quit" match, which he won via referee stoppage. In February, McGuinness began acting as a representative of NOAH and as a spokesperson and tag team partner of NOAH talent Takeshi Morishima, upon his arrival to the company. On 4 March in Liverpool, McGuinness ended his feud with Jimmy Rave by defeating him with a Rebound Lariat, which in storyline resulted in Rave suffering a broken jaw and earned the move the new name of Jawbreaker Lariat, when in reality Rave had broken his jaw a month earlier. McGuinness' next feud would be with Chris Hero, who had dubbed himself the best pure wrestler in the world. During this feud McGuinness also received two shots at the ROH World Championship, on 14 April and 16 July, but was both times defeated by champion Takeshi Morishima. On 23 June, McGuinness defeated Hero in a 30-minute time limit match, but Hero came back on 10 August and defeated McGuinness with help from his agent Larry Sweeney and the Sweet 'n' Sour Inc. in a match contested under pure wrestling rules.

==== ROH World Champion (2007–2009) ====
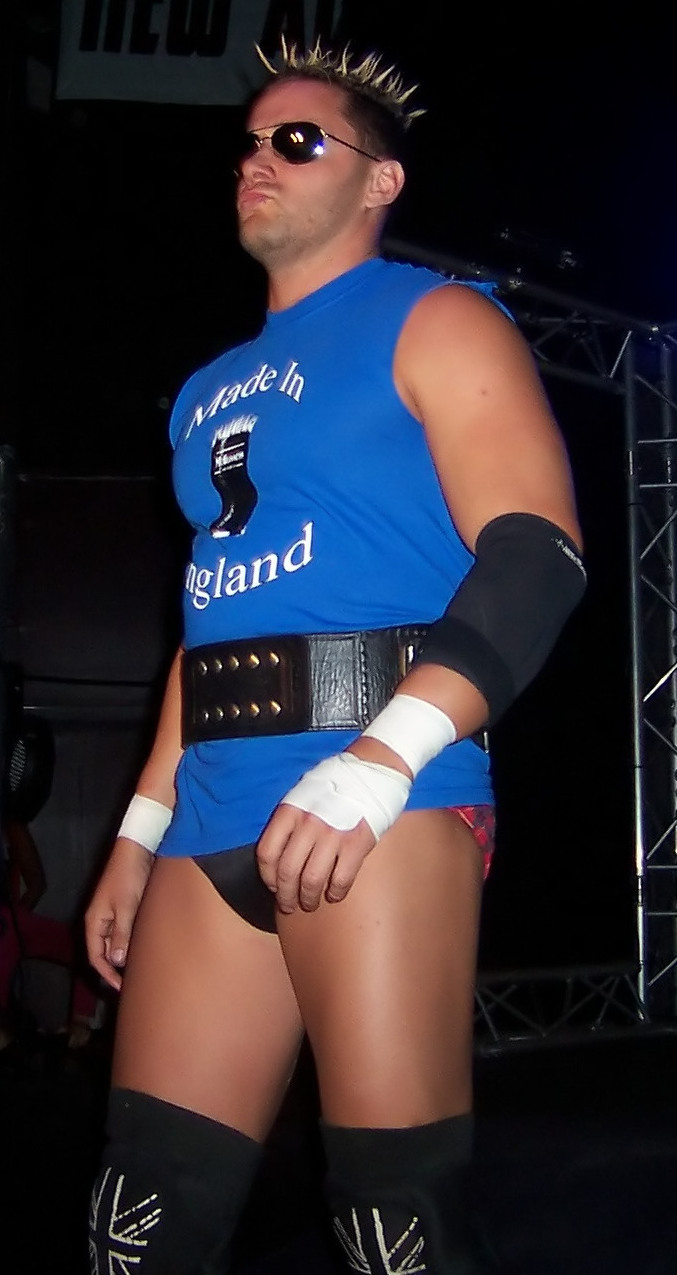
McGuinness as the ROH World Champion in October 2008

On 15 September 2007, at Man Up, ROH's third pay-per-view, McGuinness defeated Chris Hero, Claudio Castagnoli and Naomichi Marufuji in a four-way match to earn one more shot at Takeshi Morishima's ROH World Championship, which McGuinness won at Undeniable on 6 October 2007.

In late 2007, ROH confirmed that McGuinness had suffered a torn biceps and would be out of action until Final Battle 2007, however he would not be stripped of the ROH World Championship. On 2 November, the first night of ROH's Glory by Honor VI event in Philadelphia, Chris Hero and his agent Larry Sweeney complained of McGuinness' injury, calling him a fluke champion. Sweeney felt that Hero's victory of the Survival of the Fittest in Las Vegas earned him a title shot any time he wanted. McGuinness, in street clothes, accepted the challenge. He successfully retained the title against Hero, despite first losing the match due to the referee failing to notice McGuinness' foot on the rope while Hero made him tap out to submission.

On 29 December 2007, McGuinness returned to the ring full-time at ROH fifth pay-per-view, Rising Above. During his defence of the ROH World Championship against Austin Aries, however, McGuinness injured his head when Aries dove from the ring onto him, which resulted in him hitting his head on the metal guard rail. The impact gave McGuinness a concussion, broke his nose, opened his eyebrow, and required 14 stitches.

On 25 January 2008, McGuinness wrapped up his feud with Chris Hero by successfully defending his title against him in a steel cage match. In February at ROH's Sixth Anniversary Show, McGuinness turned heel during his successful title defence against Bryan Danielson by breaking an earlier agreement and targeting his head, injured earlier at the hands of Morishima. Throughout the rest of the year, McGuinness successfully defended his title against the likes of Tyler Black, Austin Aries, Kevin Steen, Claudio Castagnoli, Go Shiozaki, Jerry Lynn, Roderick Strong, El Generico and on 22 November 2008, at Rising Above, in a grudge match against Bryan Danielson.

On 20 March 2009, McGuinness sustained an arm injury competing in a tag team match. However, despite the injury reportedly requiring surgery, he still wrestled at the Seventh Anniversary Show the next night and defeated KENTA to retain his title. Finally, on 3 April 2009 at Supercard of Honor IV, McGuinness lost the ROH World Championship to Jerry Lynn at his 39th defence, ending his reign at 545 days.

==== Injuries and departure (2009) ====
After a hiatus to recover from the injury, McGuinness returned to wrestling a few months later. On 24 July, McGuinness suffered a minor injury during a four-way match after his "spine got compacted taking a piledriver", and was unable to wrestle the following night. On 4 September, ROH announced that McGuinness had "in principle" agreed to a contract with World Wrestling Entertainment (WWE), but confirmed that he would continue to wrestle for ROH until the end of September. McGuinness wrestled his last ROH match on 26 September at Glory by Honor VIII: The Final Countdown, losing to Bryan Danielson, who was also making his final appearance for the company.

=== Independent circuit (2004–2009) ===
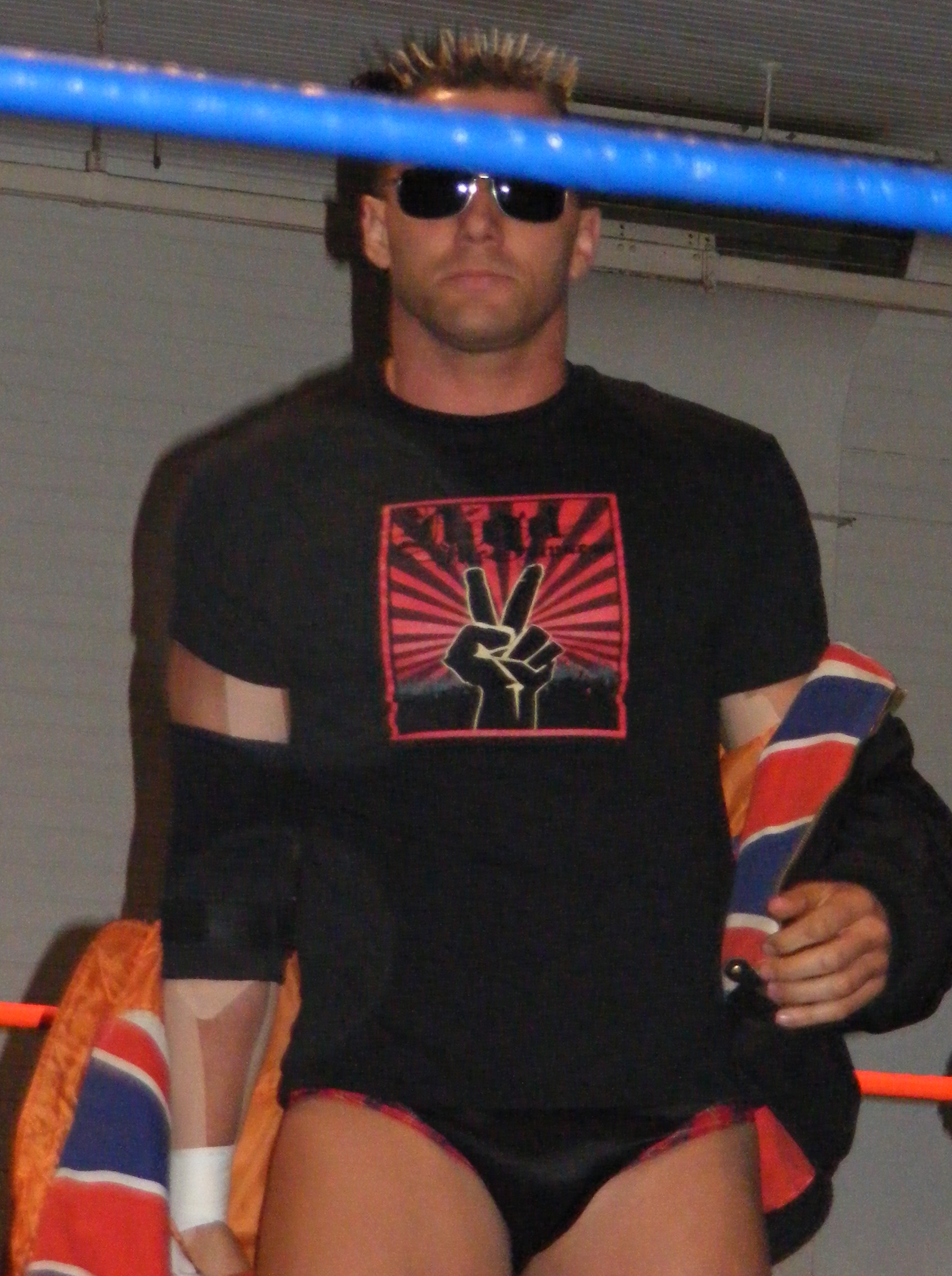
McGuinness at a 2CW show in April 2009

While still in ROH, McGuinness continued to compete in various other independent promotions like IWA Mid-South, New Era Pro Wrestling, Italian Championship Wrestling, and American All-Star Wrestling, as well as tours in various countries.

McGuinness would also make appearances for some major promotions. On 11 August 2004, McGuinness appeared in Total Nonstop Action Wrestling (TNA), debuting in a 22-man Gauntlet for the Gold for the TNA X Division Championship, which was won by Petey Williams. On 31 August 2005, McGuinness competed in Ohio Valley Wrestling, WWE's developmental territory, on episode of its OVW TV, losing to Elijah Burke. He would go on to wrestle Danny Basham on 11 September 2005, episode of Sunday Night Heat, taped prior to Raw on 5 September, losing after Basham hit an inverted DDT.

On 13 November 2005, McGuinness returned to TNA at the pre-show prior to the Genesis pay-per-view in a losing effort to Shark Boy, before leaving America to tour Japan with NOAH in November and December 2005. He wrestled nine matches in total, seven of which he won, and teamed with fellow gaijin Doug Williams, 2 Cold Scorpio and Bison Smith. During his tour of Japan, McGuinness was supposed to compete in TNA's 2006 World X Cup Tournament, but Team UK was replaced by Team Canada, after McGuinness and Williams could not appear because both were booked in Japan.

In 2007, McGuinness represented ROH in the King of Europe Cup. He made his way through to the final and, in his home country, defeated fellow Brit and tag-team partner Doug Williams to win the 2007 tournament final.

On 14 October 2007, McGuiness wrestled James Tighe in the first round of the British National Championship held by International Pro Wrestling: United Kingdom (IPW:UK), however McGuiness was disqualified for the use of brass knuckles and eliminated from the tournament.

McGuinness won the 1PW Openweight Championship, his first title in a British promotion, on 19 April 2009, by defeating Johnny Moss.

=== Total Nonstop Action Wrestling (2009–2011) ===
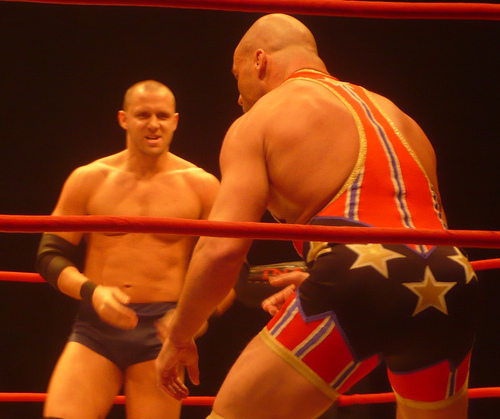
Wolfe in a match with Kurt Angle in January 2010

On 4 September 2009, ROH announced that Haworth had agreed to a contract with the WWE "in principle". On 20 October 2009, it was reported that Haworth's deal with the WWE had fallen through due to him failing a pre-screening physical test after feeling an old biceps injury needed surgery and that he had decided to sign with TNA instead. He officially made his TNA return as a heel under the ring name Desmond Wolfe on 22 October episode of Impact! by attacking Kurt Angle. The following week, Wolfe defeated Angle in a street fight via referee stoppage, following a lariat. On 12 November, Wolfe won a third exchange with Angle as he laid him out with a DDT. At Turning Point, Angle defeated Wolfe via submission. The following month at Final Resolution, Wolfe faced Angle in a "Three Degrees of Pain" two-out-of-three-falls match. Wolfe managed to gain the first fall by pinning Angle following the Tower of London, but tapped out to the ankle lock in the second fall to make it even. In the final fall, which could only be won by escaping the cage, Angle managed to escape first and won the match and the feud.

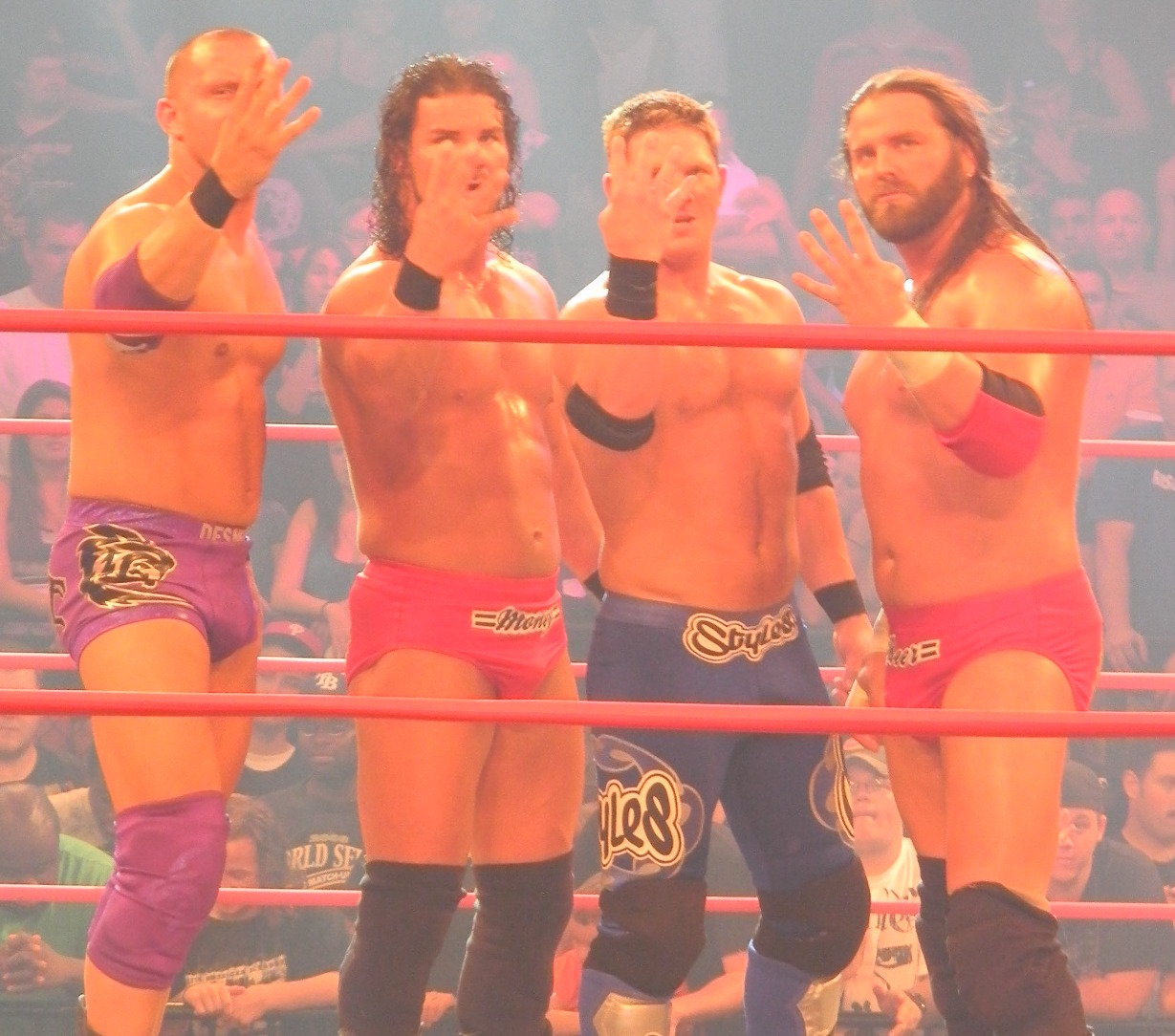
Fourtune hopefuls: (from left to right) Wolfe, Robert Roode, A.J. Styles, and James Storm.

Following the loss to Angle, Wolfe moved on to feuding with D'Angelo Dinero, who defeated him on 4 January 2010, three-hour, Monday night episode of Impact!. At Genesis, Wolfe debuted a new valet, who was later named Chelsea, and defeated Dinero in a rematch. At Against All Odds, Wolfe entered the 8 Card Stud Tournament to crown a new number one contender to the TNA World Heavyweight Championship, but was defeated in the first round by the eventual winner of the whole tournament, Dinero. On 25 February episode of Impact!, Wolfe aligned himself with Ric Flair and then TNA World Heavyweight Champion A.J. Styles in their battle with Hulk Hogan, Abyss and D'Angelo Dinero. On 4 March episode of Impact!, Wolfe received his first shot at the TNA World Heavyweight Championship, held by Styles, in a four-way match, which also included Dinero and Abyss, but Styles was able to retain his title by defeating Dinero via referee stoppage. The following week on Impact!, Wolfe and Dinero were scheduled to once again face each other, but the match was cancelled after Wolfe attacked Dinero during an interview and re-injured his ankle. Wolfe and Dinero finally had their fourth singles match together on 29 March episode of Impact!, and this time Wolfe was able to pin the number one contender after hitting him with a chain, while Chelsea was distracting the referee, but on the following episode of Impact! Dinero defeated Wolfe in a rematch in just two minutes.

At Lockdown, along with Sting, Robert Roode and James Storm, Wolfe represented Team Flair in the annual Lethal Lockdown match, where they were defeated by Team Hogan (Abyss, Jeff Jarrett, Rob Van Dam and Jeff Hardy), when Abyss pinned Wolfe. On 26 April, TNA introduced a new "Championship Ranking" system, where fans were allowed to vote on the number one contender to the TNA World Heavyweight Championship. Wolfe led the first poll from start to finish, ahead of the likes of Jeff Hardy, Mr. Anderson, Sting, A.J. Styles, Kurt Angle, Dinero, and Abyss, and on the 3 May episode of Impact! was granted a shot at the title, held by Rob Van Dam. However, Wolfe was defeated in the title match. At Sacrifice, Wolfe was defeated by Abyss, who as a result won Chelsea's services for 30 days. On the following episode of Impact!, Chelsea started showing sympathy towards Abyss, when he was being brutalised by Wolfe. The following month at Slammiversary VIII, Wolfe was defeated by Abyss in a Monster's Ball match, when Chelsea turned on him and helped Abyss pick up the victory.

In June 2010, Ric Flair, who had aligned himself with Wolfe, Styles, Roode, Storm and Kazarian, announced that he would reform The Four Horsemen under the new name Fourtune, stating that each of them would have to earn their spots in the group and that in order for Wolfe to earn his spot, he needed to become the Lex Luger of the group. Later in the night, Chelsea reluctantly returned to Wolfe after her 30 days with Abyss were up. Wolfe gave her a chance to redeem herself, but her behaviour outside the ring provided a distraction, which cost Wolfe his match against Flair's nemesis Jay Lethal. After a series of losses, Wolfe attempted to get back in good graces with Flair by helping Styles and Kazarian defeat Samoa Joe and Rob Terry at Victory Road to earn their spots in Fourtune, only to get a muscle buster from Joe after the match. On the following episode of Impact!, Wolfe confronted Flair when he inducted Styles and Kazarian into Fourtune, demanding to be included in the stable. Two weeks later on Impact!, Flair revealed Robert Roode and James Storm as the final two members of Fourtune, leaving Wolfe out of the stable.

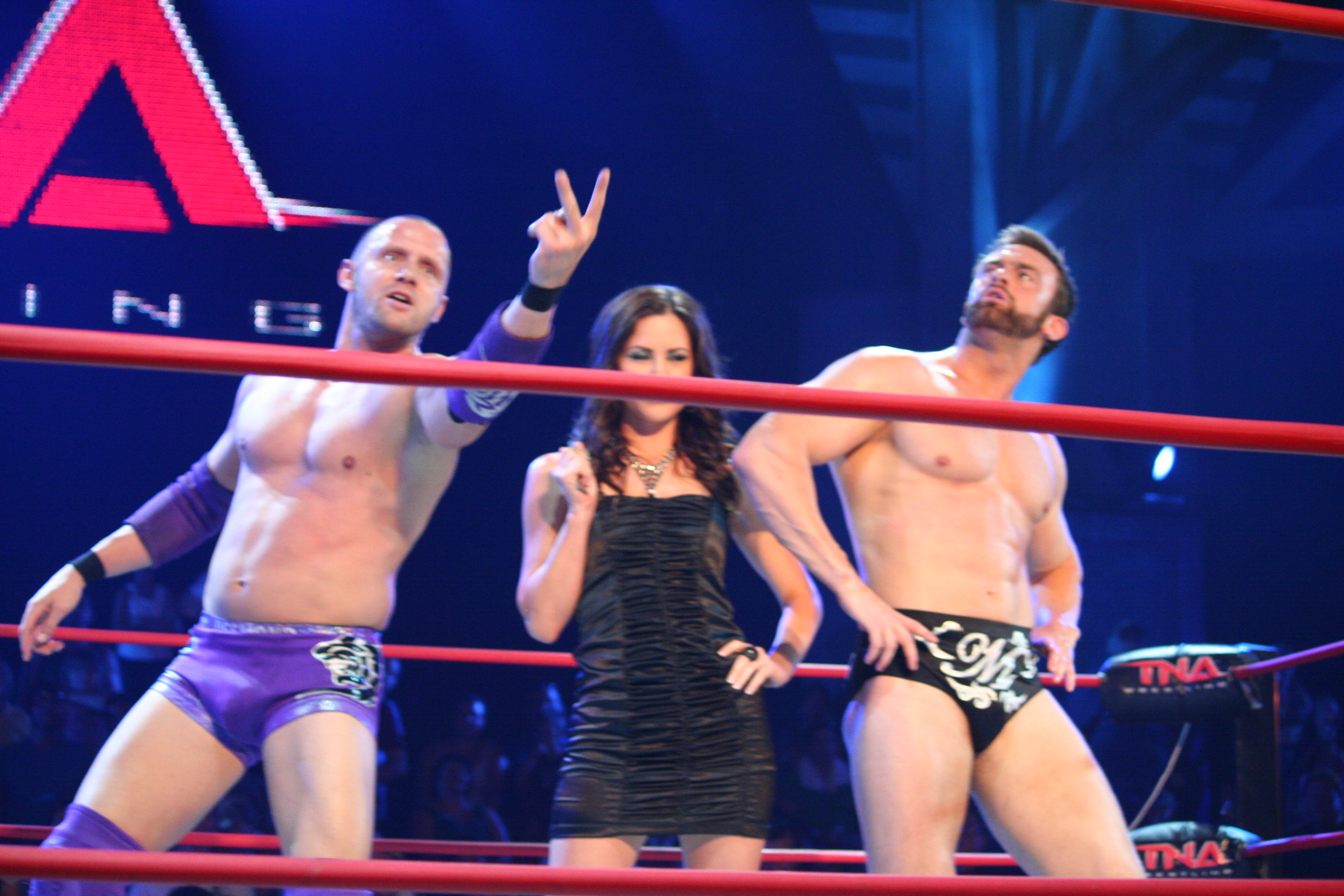
Wolfe, Chelsea and Magnus posing in the ring in July 2010

After failing to make it into Fourtune, Wolfe went on to form a tag team with fellow Briton Magnus and together the two not only ended Wolfe's losing streak, but also started a winning streak, defeating teams like Amazing Red and Suicide, Hernandez and Rob Terry and Ink Inc. (Jesse Neal and Shannon Moore) on episodes of Xplosion, and in the process earned themselves the right to challenge for the TNA World Tag Team Championship. On 26 August episode of Impact!, the team was named London Brawling. They were scheduled to receive their shot at The Motor City Machine Guns (Alex Shelley and Chris Sabin) and the TNA World Tag Team Championship at No Surrender, but were at the last minute pulled from the event, with TNA citing a "personal issue" as the reason. It was later reported that Wolfe was pulled from the event due to an undisclosed medical situation that would sideline him for the next few months. On a December 2014 podcast, McGuinness revealed that at this time, he tested positive for Hepatitis B.

On-screen his absence was explained by Magnus, who claimed that in an attempt to become a dual athlete, Wolfe had travelled to London to try out for Chelsea F.C. On 21 November 2010, TNA president Dixie Carter announced that Wolfe was close to a comeback. On 16 December episode of Impact!, Magnus met his former tag team partner Doug Williams and informed him that Wolfe was now done with football and would be coming back soon, while also telling him that they had gotten rid of Chelsea. Wolfe finally made his return in a non-televised segment on 10 December 2010, at the tapings of the 6 January 2011, episode of Impact!, when he and Magnus saved Williams from Fortune members A.J. Styles and Rob Terry.

On 16 May 2011, Wolfe made his return to TNA, when he was announced as the new commissioner of Xplosion, turning face in the process. During his time as the commissioner, Wolfe also served as the third member of the Xplosion announcing team, working beside Jeremy Borash and Taz. However, on 17 June it was reported that Wolfe had been released from his TNA contract.

=== Independent circuit and retirement (2011) ===
After a fourteen-month break from in-ring competition, it was announced on 24 October that McGuinness would be making his return to the ring on 11 November at a Squared Circle Wrestling (2CW) event in Watertown, New York, starting a two-month-long string of shows billed as the "Nigel McGuinness Retirement Tour". In his return match, McGuinness faced Eddie Edwards in a losing effort. McGuinness decided to retire since WWE didn't sign him, he didn't want to return to TNA and he couldn't continue to use the wrestling style he used in ROH. The following day, McGuinness was defeated by Chad Collyer at a HWA event in Hamilton, Ohio. A week later Haworth, performing as Desmond Wolfe, was defeated by Jebediah at a Main Event Championship Wrestling event in Alliance, Ohio. On 25 November, McGuinness returned to the United Kingdom, when he was defeated by Eddie Edwards in a Fight Club: Pro Championship three-way match in Wolverhampton, which also included Trent Seven. The following day, McGuinness was defeated by Jon Ryan at a Westside Xtreme Wrestling (wXw) event in Oberhausen, Germany, before returning to lose to Joel Redman at an International Pro Wrestling: United Kingdom (IPW:UK) event in Sittingbourne on 27 November. After two more weekends of shows in the United Kingdom, McGuinness returned to the United States for his final match, which took place at an American Pro Wrestling Alliance (APWA) event in Clarksburg, West Virginia on 17 December 2011. When Jimmy Jacobs couldn’t make it due to bad weather, promoter Don West inserted McGuinness into the match; he would initially lose this match, but the decision was reversed due to a handful of tights, causing him to win (and retire with) the championship. He would then become the APWA Commissioner/Associate Booker before signing an exclusive deal with Ring of Honor. He would compete in his final matches at APWA's 3rd Annual Holiday Grand Prix, which was a two-night show in Clarksburg, WV.

=== Return to ROH (2011–2016) ===
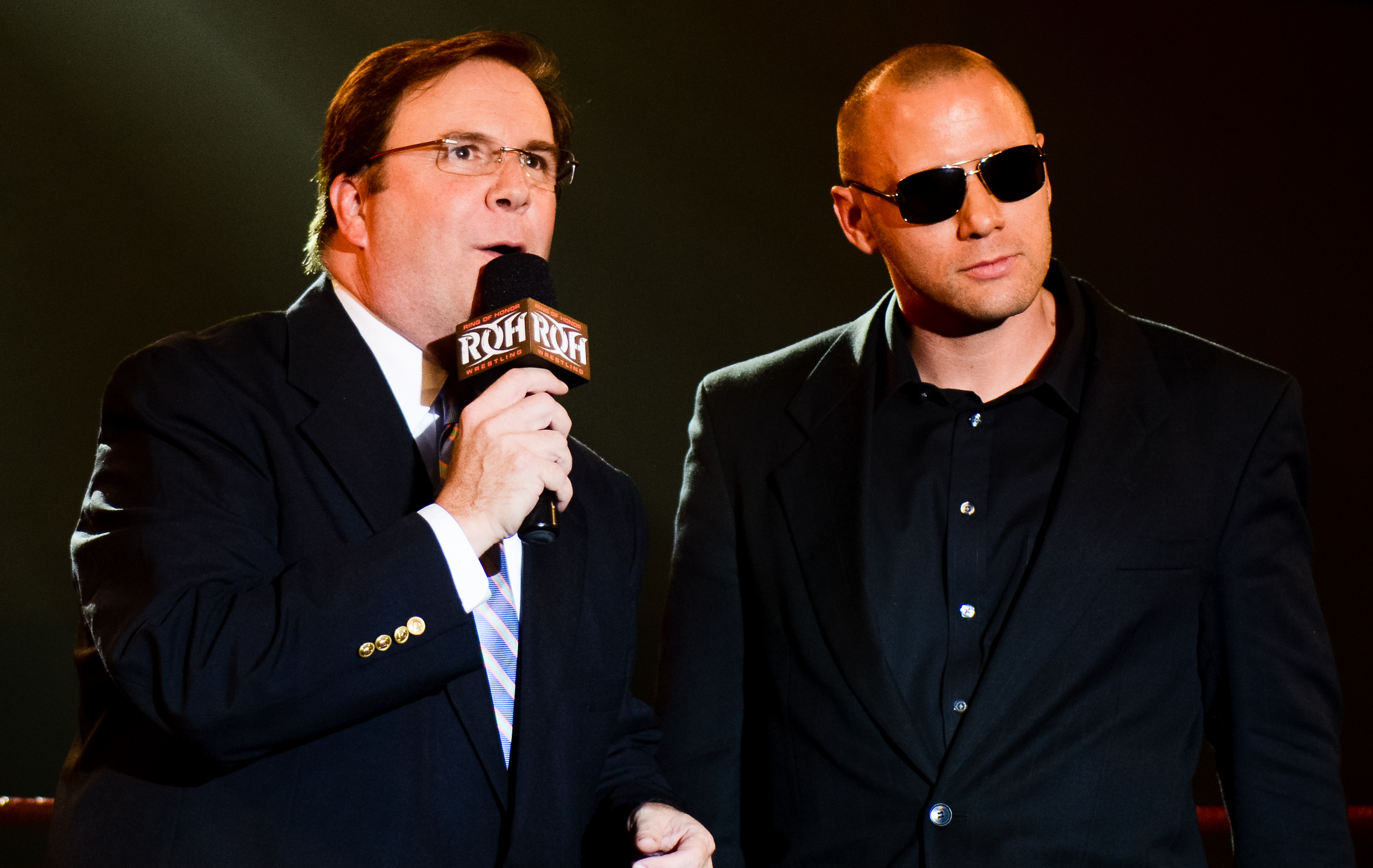
McGuinness (right) with his Ring of Honor Wrestling broadcast partner Kevin Kelly in August 2011

On 13 August 2011, Haworth, returning to his Nigel McGuinness ring name, returned to ROH at the promotion's first Ring of Honor Wrestling tapings under the Sinclair Broadcast Group banner, working as the colour commentator beside Kevin Kelly. The tapings concluded with McGuinness saving Eddie Edwards from the House of Truth. At the 3 November 2012, tapings of Ring of Honor Wrestling, McGuinness was named the new "Matchmaker" of Ring of Honor, replacing Jim Cornette as the main on-screen authority figure. In December 2012, McGuinness released a documentary titled The Last of McGuinness on his final days as an in-ring performer, during which he revealed that WWE had rescinded his contract after feeling an old biceps injury needed surgery, while his in-ring career in TNA ended after contracting hepatitis B during his time there. In late May 2013, McGuinness toured the United Kingdom with the shorter final cut of his documentary and has become an advocate for hepatitis B vaccination and an end to the use of intentional blood loss in wrestling. In 2014, following the success of his documentary, McGuinness began working in the film industry as an Assistant Editor and Production Assistant on various television shows and in December of that year launched a Kickstart campaign for his new creative project, L.A. Fights, described as a scripted show about "a diverse group of amateur fighters and their morally ambivalent promoter struggle to coexist in their upstart fight league". In December 2016, ROH announced McGuinness had resigned as the promotion's matchmaker.

=== WWE (2016–2022) ===
After being recommended by WWE lead commentator Michael Cole, on 15 December 2016, WWE announced that McGuinness had signed with the company as a commentator. McGuinness made his commentary debut at the WWE United Kingdom Championship Tournament on 14 and 15 January 2017, alongside Michael Cole. In February 2017, McGuinness became a colour commentator for NXT. In September 2017, McGuinness joined the 205 Live and Main Event commentary teams.

In 2019, WWE released a documentary on McGuinness' career entitled Chasing the Magic: The Nigel McGuinness Story on the WWE Network, that covered his full career from his early childhood fandom of wrestling to his success as a commentator for the company.

In May 2020, it was reported McGuinness had been furloughed during April as part of budget cuts stemming from the COVID-19 pandemic. He returned on the 17 September episode of NXT UK alongside Andy Shepherd and the following night on 205 Live alongside Vic Joseph.

McGuinness was released from WWE on October 22, 2022, ending his six year tenure with the company.

=== All Elite Wrestling / Ring of Honor (2023–present) ===
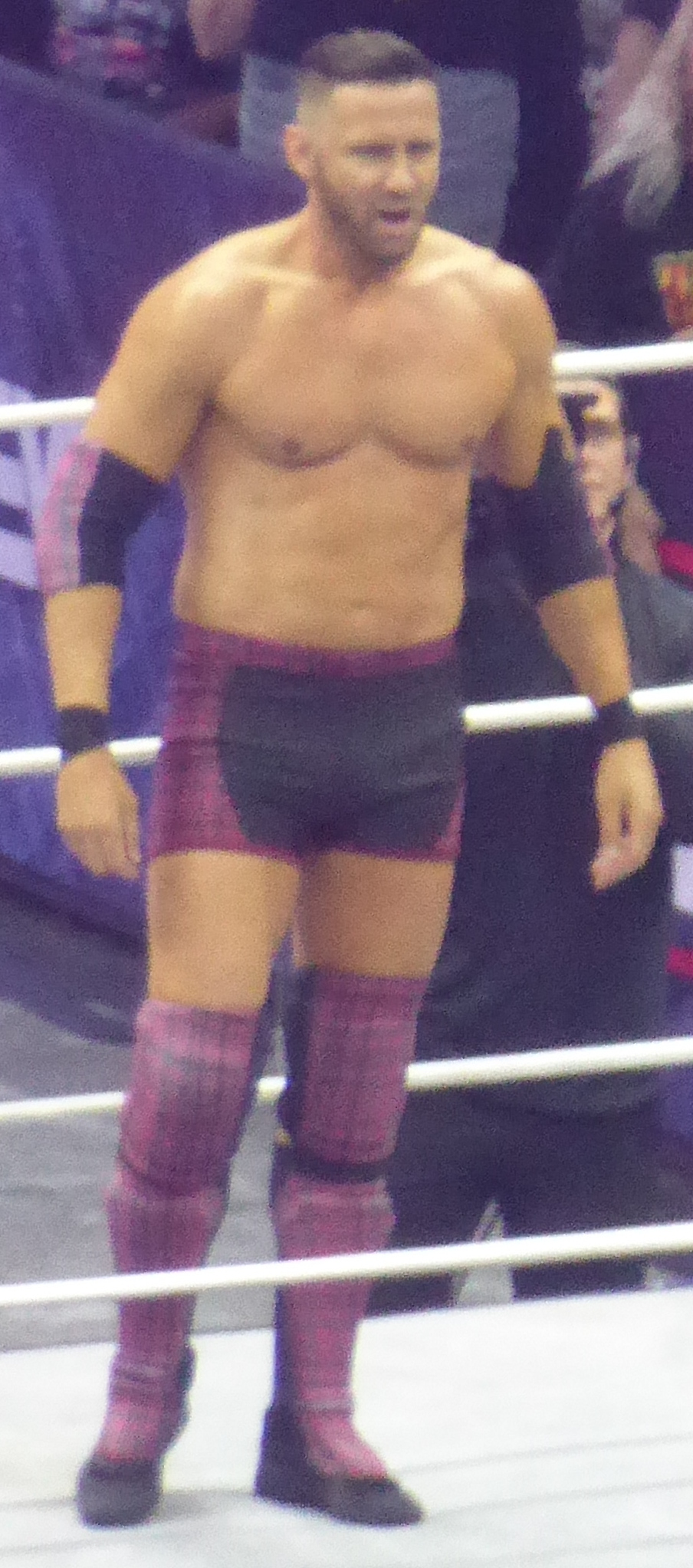
McGuinness making his in-ring return at All In in August 2024

At Supercard of Honor in March 2023, McGuinness made his surprise return to ROH for the first time since 2016, as a commentator. McGuinness went on to commentate on Ring of Honor Wrestling from April to June 2023. On 5 April 2023, AEW and ROH President and CEO Tony Khan announced that McGuinness signed a contract with ROH's sister company All Elite Wrestling (AEW). On 16 June, it was announced that McGuinness would be part of the AEW Collision commentary team alongside Kevin Kelly and Jim Ross, and later Tony Schiavone who became full-time commentary on 14 October.

McGuinness made his surprise in-ring return at All In at Wembley Stadium on 25 August 2024 as the third entrant of the Casino Gauntlet, marking McGuinness' first wrestling match since 2011. On the 11 September episode of AEW Dynamite, McGuinness challenged his long-time rival Bryan Danielson to a match at Grand Slam two weeks later, where McGuinness was defeated. On 20 December at Final Battle, McGuinness answered Lee Moriarty's open challenge for the ROH Pure Championship, but failed to win the title.

On May 25, 2025 at Double or Nothing, McGuinness teamed with Daniel Garcia in a losing effort against FTR (Cash Wheeler and Dax Harwood). On the 16 August episode of Collision. McGuinness won a "Technical Spectacle" to earn the right to challenge Zack Sabre Jr. for the IWGP World Heavyweight Championship at Forbidden Door on 24 August, but was defeated at the event. At Final Battle in December 2025, McGuinness once again failed to defeat Moriarty for the ROH Pure Championship in an 30-minute Iron man match that ended in sudden death overtime 5-4.

In August 2026, McGuinness entered the inaugural Continental Challenge Cup and was able to make it to the grand final at All In on 30 August, where he lost to the reigning AEW Continental Champion Jon Moxley.

== Personal life ==
Haworth had one child in 2018. He also has a child with his girlfriend Kaori.

Haworth's in-ring run in TNA ended when he tested positive for hepatitis B. He was taken off TV in September 2010 and never wrestled for the company again.

In March 2023, Haworth staged a one-man show in Santa Monica, California. It combined stories from his wrestling career with magic.

== Championships and accomplishments ==
- The Baltimore Sun
  - Newcomer of the Year (2009)
- FIST Wrestling
  - FIST Heavyweight Championship (1 time)
- Heartland Wrestling Association
  - HWA European Championship (2 times, final)
  - HWA Heavyweight Championship (2 times)
  - HWA Tag Team Championship (2 times) – with the Human Time Bomb
- New Breed Wrestling Association
  - New Breed Heavyweight Championship (2 times)
- One Pro Wrestling
  - 1PW Openweight Championship (1 time)
- Pro Wrestling Illustrated
  - Ranked No. 6 of the top 500 singles wrestlers in the PWI 500 in 2009
- Ring of Honor
  - ROH Pure Championship (1 time)
  - ROH World Championship (1 time)
- Total Nonstop Action Wrestling
  - TNA World Tag Team Championship No. 1 Contenders Tournament (2010) – with Magnus
- Other titles
  - King of Europe Cup (2007)
- Wrestling Observer Newsletter
  - Best Television Announcer (2024)
