= The Band (professional wrestling) =

Professional wrestling stable

Stable
- Members: See below
- Name: The Band
- Debut: January 4, 2010
- Disbanded: October 10, 2010
- Years active: 2010 (9 months, 6 days)

The Band was a professional wrestling stable which competed in Total Nonstop Action Wrestling (TNA) in 2010. The group – which originally consisted of Kevin Nash, Scott Hall and Syxx-Pac – was presented as an unofficial reunion of the World Championship Wrestling (WCW) stable the New World Order (nWo), specifically its Wolfpac subgroup.

== History ==
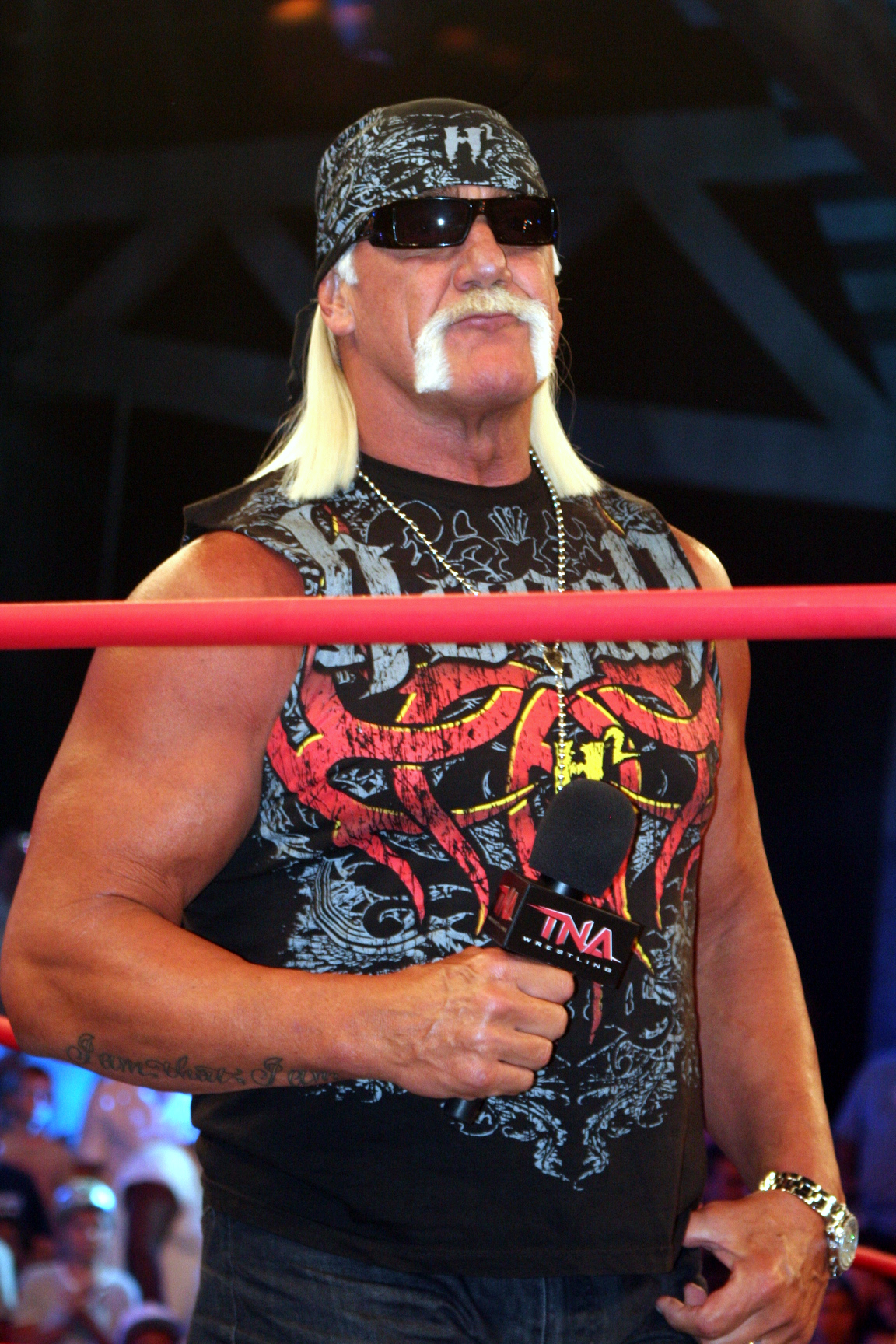
A reunion was spurred by Hogan's TNA arrival in 2010

The Band debuted in TNA in 2010 when, weeks prior to the debut of Hulk Hogan in Total Nonstop Action Wrestling (TNA), Kevin Nash had hinted that "the band was getting back together" (a reference to nWo 2000 catchphrase, "The Band is Back Together"). On the January 4, 2010, live Impact! Monday night three-hour special, Sean Waltman and Scott Hall made their returns to TNA and with Nash had sought to rehash, to some extent, their invasive alliance (though not legally permitted to use the nWo moniker due to WWE's ownership), with the debuting Hogan (who used an edit of the nWo 2000 theme as his entrance music, as well as all black attire and 5 o'clock shadow). This was the first time in over eight years the members had been seen together at a wrestling event. Hogan conceded the others were his "brothers 4 life"; however, he would decline the offer, stating that "it's a different time". Eric Bischoff then came down and clarified that in partnering with Hogan to run the talent department, everyone would have to earn their spots in the company. At the end of the show, Nash, Hall and Waltman assaulted Mick Foley, who confronted Bischoff in the office while trying to get a meeting with Hogan, and beat him down until Hogan arrived on the scene to end the show.

The following week, The Band attacked Beer Money, Inc. (Robert Roode and James Storm), who had asked Bischoff for a match against Hall and Nash, after their match with Hernandez and Matt Morgan, which led to Bischoff, clearly on friendly terms with The Band, coming out and announcing a match between Beer Money and Hall and Nash at Genesis where Waltman, once again using the ring name Syxx-Pac, replaced Hall after a game of rock-paper-scissors for the spot in the match and teamed up with Nash against Beer Money in a losing effort. On the following episode of Impact!, Hogan told Nash, Hall and Syxx-Pac that their attitude towards their pay-per-view return was disrespectful. He added that since Hall and Syxx-Pac did not have TNA contracts, they were ordered to leave the company. Despite this, Hall and Syxx-Pac kept on returning to the Impact! Zone for random attacks and on the February 4 episode of Impact!, Hall and Syxx-Pac turned on Nash and beat him down. At Destination X, Hall and Syxx-Pac faced Nash and Eric Young in a tag team match, where their TNA futures were on the line; if The Band managed to win the match, they would get contracts with TNA, but if they lost, they would have to leave the company for good. In the end, Nash turned on Young and gave Hall and Syxx-Pac the victory.

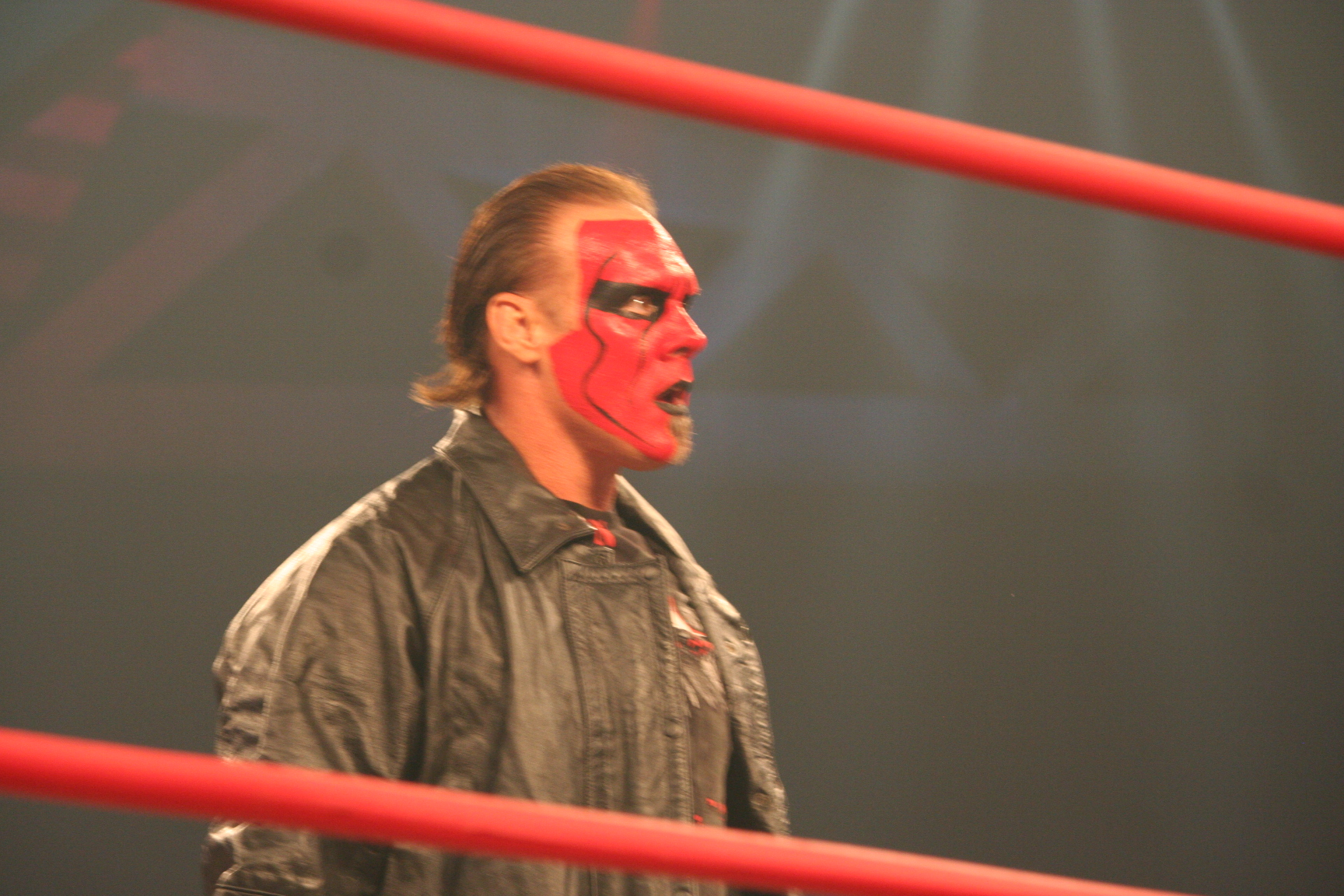
Sting with red face paint, similar to the paint he used during the Wolfpac

Beginning in late March, the group also began referring to themselves as the Wolfpack, after the nWo Wolfpac splinter group in WCW, and using an instrumental version of the nWo Wolfpac/Kevin Nash's WCW theme music, a version created by former WCW music director Jimmy Hart. On the March 29 episode of Impact!, Nash offered Young a spot in the Wolfpac. Young refused the offer and in the main event of the evening, teamed up with Rob Van Dam and Jeff Hardy to defeat the Wolfpac in a six-man tag team steel cage match. During the episode, Bubba also debuted as the group's personal interviewer. At Lockdown, Nash defeated Young in a steel cage match. Later in the night, Nash replaced Syxx-Pac, who no-showed the event, and teamed up with Hall in a St. Louis Street Fight, where they were defeated by Team 3D. It was later reported that Waltman had let TNA know days in advance that he was not cleared to wrestle by the Missouri State Commission and was not going to be able to attend the event. On the April 26 episode of Impact!, Waltman was found lying backstage in a pool of his own blood, after apparently having been put through a table off screen by Team 3D. The following week, Eric Young turned on Team 3D and revealed himself as the surprise third member of the Wolfpac, replacing Syxx-Pac. On May 4, at the tapings of the May 13 episode of Impact!, after TNA World Tag Team Champion Matt Morgan had been attacked by Samoa Joe, Nash cashed in his "Feast or Fired" contract, teaming with Hall, and pinned him to win the TNA World Tag Team Championship. Prior to their match at Sacrifice, Nash invoked the so-called "Freebird Rule" which allowed Eric Young to be recognized as a champion and allowed any two of the three members to defend the championships at any time. At the event, Nash and Hall defeated Ink Inc. (Jesse Neal and Shannon Moore). At the June 14 tapings of the June 17 episode of Impact!, the Wolfpac was stripped of the TNA World Tag Team Championship due to Hall's legal problems. The following day it was reported that both Hall and Waltman had been released from their contracts with TNA. On the June 24 episode of Impact!, Nash and Young decided to part ways, as Nash intended to go after Hogan, whom he blamed for what had happened to Hall and Waltman, and did not want Young to get into trouble for it.

After Nash was unable to convince Hogan to re-hire Hall and Waltman and failed to secure a meeting with Eric Bischoff, he set his sights on renewing his feud with Jeff Jarrett, who claimed that Nash had tried to hurt TNA by bringing in Hall and Waltman. On the August 5 episode of Impact!, Sting, who had feuded with Jarrett prior to his 30-day suspension, returned to TNA and, together with Nash, beat down Jarrett, Bischoff and Hogan. On the August 26 episode of Impact!, Nash defeated Jarrett in a singles match after an interference from Sting. The following week, Nash helped Sting to defeat Jarrett. After the match, Samoa Joe aligned himself with Jarrett and Hogan and drove Nash and Sting away. At No Surrender, Jarrett and Joe defeated Nash and Sting in a tag team match after Jarrett hit Sting with a baseball bat. On the September 16 episode of Reaction, Nash and Sting were joined by D'Angelo Dinero, who claimed to have gotten inside information from Bischoff's secretary Miss Tessmacher that would suggest Nash and Sting were right about Hogan and Bischoff being up to something. At Bound for Glory, Nash, Sting and Dinero faced Jeff Jarrett and Samoa Joe in a handicap match after Hogan, who was scheduled to team with Jarrett and Joe, was forced to pull out due to a back surgery. At the end of the match, Jarrett abandoned Joe and left him to be pinned by Nash. It was revealed that Nash and Sting had been right about Hogan and Bischoff all along, as they turned heel with Jarrett, Abyss and Jeff Hardy, and in the process turned Nash, Sting and Dinero back to being faces. On October 13, 2010, Nash's contract with TNA expired and he announced his retirement from professional wrestling. His last TNA appearance was a taping broadcast on October 14, 2010, when Nash and Sting both announced they were walking away from TNA rather than being a part of Hogan and Bischoff's regime.

== Members ==
Incarnation	Members	Tenures	Notes
The Band	Kevin Nash (leader; kicked out on February 4, rejoined on March 21); Scott Hall (left TNA in June); Syxx-Pac (left TNA in June); Eric Young (joined on May 3, left on June 24); Bubba (personal interviewer; joined in late March, fired from TNA on April 30); Sting (joined on August 5); D'Angelo Dinero (joined on September 16)	January 4, 2010 – June 24, 2010; August 5, 2010 – October 14, 2010	

== Championships and accomplishments ==
- Total Nonstop Action Wrestling
  - TNA World Tag Team Championship (1 time) – Eric Young, Kevin Nash and Scott Hall (1)^{1}

^{1} During their reign, Hall and Nash invoked "The Band Rules" and named Eric Young as a co-champion.
