= TNA Genesis (2010) =

2010 Total Nonstop Action Wrestling pay-per-view event

Genesis (2010)
- Promotional poster featuring (clockwise) Kurt Angle, A.J. Styles, and Hulk Hogan
- Promotion: Total Nonstop Action Wrestling
- Date: January 17, 2010
- City: Orlando, Florida
- Venue: TNA Impact! Zone
- Attendance: 1,100
- Tagline: The Night of Firsts

Pay-per-view chronology
← Previous; Final Resolution	Next → Against All Odds

Genesis chronology
← Previous; 2009	Next → 2011

The 2010 Genesis was a professional wrestling pay-per-view (PPV) event produced by the Total Nonstop Action Wrestling (TNA) promotion, which took place on January 17, 2010 at the TNA Impact! Zone in Orlando, Florida. It was the fifth event under the Genesis chronology and the first event of the 2010 TNA PPV schedule. The PPV poster was released in early December 2009, promoting Hulk Hogan's debut on TNA PPV. It is the first event since TNA moved to the Impact! Zone to feature a four-sided ring (as opposed to the six-sided ring used by TNA since the move).

== Storylines ==
Genesis featured professional wrestling matches that involved different wrestlers from pre-existing scripted feuds and storylines. Wrestlers portrayed villains, heroes or less distinguishable characters in the events that build tension and culminate into a wrestling match or series of matches.

The main rivalry showcased at Genesis was between Kurt Angle and defending champion A.J. Styles, both fighting for the TNA World Heavyweight Championship. Ric Flair made his debut in the company on the January 4, 2010 live episode of TNA Impact!, getting acquainted with A.J. Styles on a monumental night for the company, where in a high-profile match, Styles retained his championship by defeating his competitive rival in Kurt Angle. By doing so, and for the past months, Styles solidified himself as champion successfully defending his title. Angle would later receive one last chance at the TNA World Heavyweight Championship, with Angle claiming that he only needed one more chance to be able to defeat Styles.

Bobby Lashley was lined up to compete with Abyss but was attacked backstage by Abyss before the match. As a result, this set up a mystery opponent to take on Abyss leading to the re-debut of Mr. Anderson, who last made appearances for TNA in its early years.

A feud on the card had Beer Money, Inc. (Robert Roode and James Storm) seeking vengeance against Kevin Nash and Scott Hall. It was revealed that Hall and Nash had mysteriously attacked Roode and Storm. Wanting to avenge the beat down they encountered, an upset Roode and Storm approached on-screen executive Eric Bischoff and requested a match with Hall and Nash at Genesis.

Another feud was between D'Angelo Dinero and Desmond Wolfe. D'Angelo Dinero started a feud with Desmond Wolfe calling him "Desmond Ruffy". With the two competing in a one-on-one match, Dinero was able to gain the victory with a successful small package pin. After Wolfe later secured a victory over Samoa Joe, Dinero and Wolfe accosted each other, both claiming they would beat one another at the PPV.

After Rob Terry of British Invasion interfered in a match that caused a disqualification win for Hernandez and Matt Morgan in their match with Beer Money, Morgan reacted by attacking Terry which set up defending champions British Invasion (Brutus Magnus and Doug Williams) versus Hernandez and Matt Morgan for the TNA World Tag Team Championship at Genesis.

A match in the Knockout Division pit Tara against defending champion ODB for the TNA Women's Knockout Championship. This match came about after ODB defeated Tara for the TNA Women's Knockout Title, setting up a rematch at Genesis.

Sean Morley made his debut in TNA, much to Daniels displeasure, claiming Morley was someone who did not belong in "his company" during a brawl between the two.

A match was made where a debuting Brian Kendrick faced defending champion Amazing Red for the TNA X Division Championship.

== Event ==
Other on-screen personnel
Role:	Name:
Commentator	Mike Tenay
Commentator	Taz
Interviewer	Jeremy Borash
Interviewer	Lauren Thompson
Ring announcer	Jeremy Borash
Ring announcer	David Penzer
Referee	Earl Hebner
Referee	Rudy Charles
Referee	Mark Johnson
Referee	Andrew Thomas

=== Preliminary matches ===
The event began with Amazing Red defending the TNA X Division Championship against a mystery opponent, which was revealed to be Brian Kendrick. After an intense back and forth, high flying contest, Red was on the apron as Kendrick charged him. Red countered the charge into his finisher Code Red and scored the pinfall victory, retaining the championship.

The following contest saw the in-ring debut of Sean Morley as he competed against the villainous Daniels. During the contest the heel Daniels was cheered by the crowd, while the supposed face Morley was booed. The match concluded after Daniels missed the BME, allowing Morley to capitalize and connect with the Money Shot, followed by the pinfall.

The third match of the night, and the second of four championship bouts saw Tara challenge ODB for the TNA Women's Knockout Championship in a two out of three falls match. Tara quickly won the first fall with a roll-up. Tara then won the second fall several minutes later after executing her finisher the Widow's Peak, winning the Championship for the third time.

The next match saw The British Invasion defend their TNA World Tag Team Championship against the number one contenders Matt Morgan and Hernandez. As the match neared its conclusion Hernandez hit his inverted powerslam finisher on Brutus Magnus, which allowed Morgan (the legal man) to connect with the Carbon Footprint on Magnus and score the three count, and simultaneously, the Tag Team Championships with Hernandez.

The fifth contest saw Desmond Wolfe attempt to defeat D'Angelo Dinero in re-match from their bout on the January 4 edition of Impact!, which Dinero had won. Wolfe was successful in the contest after connecting with a lariat and scoring the pinfall.

After a backstage segment in which The Band members Syxx-Pac and Scott Hall competed in a game of rock, paper, scissors to determine who would be Kevin Nash's tag team partner, the following match began. The match saw Nash and Syxx-Pac face Beer Money, Inc., aka Robert Roode and James Storm. As the match neared its finish, Nash attempted his Jackknife Powerbomb, however was distracted by the emergence of Hall, which allowed Storm to hit a Last Call, and Roode to pin him with a roll-up. During Hall's walk to the ring he kayfabe assaulted a fan at ringside by slapping him and pulling him over the barricade to kick him.

=== Main event matches ===
The first of Genesis' two main event matches saw Abyss compete against a mystery opponent. Abyss was scheduled to face Bobby Lashley, however Lashley was replaced by Hulk Hogan, after Abyss knocked out Lashley with a computer monitor while defending Eric Bischoff in an altercation between the three. After Abyss' entrance the arena lights were killed momentarily as Mr. Anderson (formerly Mr. Kennedy), made his TNA debut. During the match Anderson played on Hogan's demand (that Abyss not use weapons to prove his abilities), by attempting to use a chair, or throwing the chair in the ring. As Abyss grabbed the chair from the ring he momentarily appeared to contemplate using it, however decided to hand the chair to the referee, which allowed Anderson to retrieve brass knuckles from his tights and hit Abyss with them, which he followed with the pin and the victory.

The eighth and final contest of the event was between A.J. Styles and challenger Kurt Angle for the TNA World Heavyweight Championship in his last chance for the title. The contest was highly competitive, featuring back and forth action between he two. Eventually Styles connected with the Pelé, providing him with a near fall on Angle. Angle followed this with his finisher the Angle Slam, which provided him with a similar near fall. During the contest Ric Flair made his way to ringside to watch the match. Styles managed to gain momentum once again and attempt a Styles Clash, which Angle countered into the ankle lock submission. Styles managed to make it to the ropes, but only momentarily, as Angle quickly locked the submission in again, though Styles once again countered it. In desperation, Angle attempted a moonsault, which he missed, allowing Styles to capitalize with a 450° splash attempt, which Angle managed to avoid. Angle once again locked in the ankle lock, and after several moments, he followed it by grapevining his legs around Styles' leg. After several moments Styles submitted to the hold, however, the referee did not witness the submission due to Ric Flair suddenly pulling him out of the ring. Angle chased Flair around the ringside, but when he returned to the ring, he ran straight into a clothesline from Styles. Flair then retrieved the championship belt from ringside and slid it to Styles, who thought hard about using it but in the end decided to hit Angle with it, thus turning himself heel. Flair threw the referee back into the ring to make the three count, which meant that Styles retained his championship.

== Results ==
No.	Results	Stipulations	Times
1	Amazing Red (c) defeated Brian Kendrick	Singles match for the TNA X Division Championship	09:04
2	Sean Morley defeated Daniels	Singles match	09:07
3	Tara defeated ODB (c) (2–0)	Two-out-of-three falls match for the TNA Women's Knockout Championship	09:20
4	Hernandez and Matt Morgan defeated The British Invasion (Brutus Magnus and Doug Williams) (c)	Tag team match for the TNA World Tag Team Championship	08:45
5	Desmond Wolfe defeated D'Angelo Dinero	Singles match	13:32
6	Beer Money, Inc. (James Storm and Robert Roode) defeated The Band (Kevin Nash and Syxx-Pac)	Tag team match	09:43
7	Mr. Anderson defeated Abyss	Singles match	10:35
8	A.J. Styles (c) defeated Kurt Angle	Last Chance match for the TNA World Heavyweight Championship	28:48
(c) / – the champion(s) heading into the match
