= 2010 in professional wrestling =

2010 in professional wrestling describes the year's events in the world of professional wrestling.

== List of notable promotions ==
These promotions held notable events in 2010.

| Promotion Name | Abbreviation | Notes |
|---|---|---|
| Combat Zone Wrestling | CZW | |
| Consejo Mundial de Lucha Libre | CMLL | |
| Jersey All Pro Wrestling | JAPW | |
| Juggalo Championship Wrestling | JCW | |
| Lucha Libre AAA Worldwide | AAA | The "AAA" abbreviation has been used since the mid-1990s and had previously stood for the promotion's original name Asistencia Asesoría y Administración. |
| New Japan Pro-Wrestling | NJPW | |
| Pro Wrestling Guerrilla | PWG | |
| Ring of Honor | ROH | |
| Total Nonstop Action Wrestling | TNA | |
| Westside Xtreme Wrestling | wXw | |
| World Wrestling Council | WWC | |
| World Wrestling Entertainment | WWE | WWE divided its roster into three storyline divisions, Raw, SmackDown, and ECW, referred to as brands, where wrestlers exclusively performed on their respective weekly television programs until February, when ECW was disbanded, leaving only Raw and SmackDown. |

== Calendar of notable shows ==
=== January ===
| Date | Promotion(s) | Event | Location | Main event | Notes |
|---|---|---|---|---|---|
| 4 | NJPW | Wrestle Kingdom IV | Tokyo | Shinsuke Nakamura (c) defeated Yoshihiro Takayama in a Singles match to retain the IWGP Heavyweight Championship | |
| 3 | WWC | Euphoria | San Juan, Puerto Rico | El Sensacional Carlitos pinned Hiram Tua | |
| 17 | TNA | Genesis | Orlando | AJ Styles (c) defeated Kurt Angle in a Singles match to retain the TNA World Heavyweight Championship | This event was Ken Anderson (now under ring name Mr. Anderson) and Brian Kendrick's debut in TNA. |
| 31 | WWE: Raw; SmackDown; ECW | Royal Rumble | Atlanta | Edge won the 30-man Royal Rumble match by last eliminating John Cena to earn a world championship match at WrestleMania XXVI | Edge chose to challenge for the World Heavyweight Championship. Final WWE PPV to feature the ECW brand, as well as the ECW Championship, as the brand was disbanded on February 16, and the title was deactivated along with it. |
(c) – denotes defending champion(s)

=== February ===
| Date | Promotion(s) | Event | Location | Main event |
|---|---|---|---|---|
| 14 | TNA | Against All Odds | Orlando | D'Angelo Dinero defeated Mr. Anderson in Finals of the 8 Card Stud Tournament |
| 21 | WWE: Raw; SmackDown | Elimination Chamber | St. Louis | Chris Jericho defeated The Undertaker (c), John Morrison, R-Truth, CM Punk, and Rey Mysterio in an Elimination Chamber match for the World Heavyweight Championship |
(c) – denotes defending champion(s)

=== March ===
| Date | Promotion(s) | Event | Location | Main event | Notes |
|---|---|---|---|---|---|
| 12 | AAA | Rey de Reyes | Querétaro, Querétaro, Mexico | Rey de Reyes final three-way elimination match | |
| 13 | wXw | The Vision | Philadelphia, Pennsylvania | Thumbtack Jack defeats Drake Younger in a Pain In The Glass Match. | First show in the United States. |
| 21 | TNA | Destination X | Orlando | AJ Styles (c) fought Abyss to a no-contest for the TNA World Heavyweight Championship | |
| 28 | WWE: Raw; SmackDown | WrestleMania XXVI | Glendale | The Undertaker defeated Shawn Michaels in No Disqualification Streak vs. Career match | This was Shawn Michaels's last match in his wrestling career until he had one further match at Crown Jewel 2018. Last WrestleMania to feature the Money in the Bank ladder match due to the establishment of an annual pay-per-view based on the match. |
(c) – denotes defending champion(s)

=== April ===
| Date | Promotion(s) | Event | Location | Main event | Notes |
|---|---|---|---|---|---|
| 3 | ROH | ROH The Big Bang! | Charlotte | Blue Demon, Jr. and Magno defeated Super Parka and Misterioso in a Tag team match | |
| 16 | CMLL | 54. Aniversario de Arena México | Mexico City, Mexico | El Felino defeated Místico | |
| 18 | TNA | Lockdown | Saint Charles | Team Hogan (Abyss, Rob Van Dam, Jeff Jarrett, Jeff Hardy, and D'Angelo Dinero) defeated Team Flair (Sting, James Storm, Robert Roode, Desmond Wolfe, and Samoa Joe); Lethal Lockdown match. Had Team Flair won, Hulk Hogan would have left the company. | |
| 25 | WWE: Raw; SmackDown | Extreme Rules | Baltimore | John Cena (c) defeated Batista in Last Man Standing match to retain the WWE Championship | This was Triple H's last appearance as full-time wrestler |
(c) – denotes defending champion(s)

=== May ===
| Date | Promotion(s) | Event | Location | Main event | Notes |
|---|---|---|---|---|---|
| 3 | NJPW | Wrestling Dontaku | Fukuoka, Japan | Togi Makabe defeated Shinsuke Nakamura (c) in a Singles match to win the IWGP Heavyweight Championship | |
| 16 | TNA | Sacrifice | Orlando | Rob Van Dam (c) defeated AJ Styles in a Singles match to retain the TNA World Heavyweight Championship | |
| 23 | WWE: Raw; SmackDown | Over the Limit | Detroit | John Cena (c) defeated Batista in an "I Quit" match to retain the WWE Championship | This was Batista's last match in WWE until 2014 |
(c) – denotes defending champion(s)

=== June ===
| Date | Promotion(s) | Event | Location | Main event |
|---|---|---|---|---|
| 6 | AAA | Triplemanía XVIII | Mexico City, Mexico | L.A. Park defeated La Parka in a Singles match for the rights to the name "La Parka" |
| 6 | CMLL | Sin Salida | Mexico City, Mexico | Máximo defeated Taichi in a Lucha de Apuestas, hair vs. hair match |
| 13 | TNA | Slammiversary | Orlando | Rob Van Dam (c) defeated Sting in a Singles match to retain the TNA World Heavyweight Championship |
| 19 | NJPW | Dominion | Osaka | Togi Makabe (c) defeated Go Shiozaki in a Singles match to retain the IWGP Heavyweight Championship |
| 19 | ROH | Death Before Dishonor | Toronto | Tyler Black (c) defeated Davey Richards in a Singles match to retain the ROH World Championship |
| 20 | WWE: Raw; SmackDown | Fatal 4-Way | Uniondale | Sheamus defeated John Cena (c), Randy Orton, and Edge in a Fatal 4-Way match to win the WWE Championship |
(c) – denotes defending champion(s)

=== July ===
| Date | Promotion(s) | Event | Location | Main event |
|---|---|---|---|---|
| 10 | CZW/JAPW | Acid-Fest: A Tribute to Trent Acid | South Philadelphia, Pennsylvania | Johnny Kashmere defeated Devon Moore |
| 11 | TNA | Victory Road | Orlando | Rob Van Dam (c) defeated Jeff Hardy, Mr. Anderson and Abyss in a Fatal 4-Way match to retain the TNA World Heavyweight Championship |
| 11 | WWC | 37th WWC Aniversario | Bayamon, Puerto Rico | Carlito defeated Orlando Colon by countout; Booker T vs. Carlito saw no winner as the official referee was knocked out; Banderas defeated Carlito after he revealed himself as the third opponent |
| 12 | CMLL | Promociones Gutiérrez 1st Anniversary Show | Nuevo Laredo, Tamaulipas, Mexico | Místico defeated El Oriental in a Lucha de Apuestas, mask vs. mask match |
| 18 | CMLL | Infierno en el Ring | Mexico City, Mexico | 12-man Infierno en el Ring, Lucha de Apuestas mask vs. mask Steel cage match |
| 18 | WWE: Raw; SmackDown | Money in the Bank | Kansas City | Sheamus (c) defeated John Cena in a Steel Cage match to retain the WWE Championship |
(c) – denotes defending champion(s)

=== August ===
| Date | Promotion(s) | Event | Location | Main event |
|---|---|---|---|---|
| 8 | TNA | Hardcore Justice | Orlando | Rob Van Dam defeated Sabu in a Hardcore Rules match |
| 12 | TNA | The Whole F'n Show | Orlando | Rob Van Dam (c) defeated Abyss in a Stairway to Janice Ladder match to retain the TNA World Heavyweight Championship with Eric Bischoff as the guest referee |
| 14 | AAA | Verano de Escándalo | Orizaba, Veracruz, Mexico | El Mesías defeated Dr. Wagner Jr. (c) in a Domo De La Muerte cage match for the AAA Mega Championship |
| 6–15 | NJPW | G1 Climax final | Tokyo | Satoshi Kojima defeated Hiroshi Tanahashi in the G1 Climax tournament |
| 15 | JCW | Bloodymania IV | Cave-In-Rock, Illinois | Corporal Robinson (c) defeated Mike Knox and Raven |
| 15 | WWE: Raw; SmackDown | SummerSlam | Los Angeles | Team WWE (John Cena, Daniel Bryan, Edge, Chris Jericho, Bret Hart, R-Truth and John Morrison) defeated The Nexus (Wade Barrett, Justin Gabriel, Heath Slater, David Otunga, Skip Sheffield, Michael Tarver and Darren Young) in a 7-on-7 Elimination tag team match |
(c) – denotes defending champion(s)

=== September ===
| Date | Promotion(s) | Event | Location | Main event | Notes |
|---|---|---|---|---|---|
| 4–5 | PWG | Battle of Los Angeles | Reseda, California | Joey Ryan defeated Chris Hero in a Battle of Los Angeles tournament | |
| 5 | TNA | No Surrender | Orlando | Mr. Anderson defeated D'Angelo Dinero in Semi-Finals of the TNA World Heavyweight Championship Tournament | |
| 11 | ROH | Glory By Honor | New York City | Roderick Strong defeated Tyler Black (c) No Disqualification match to win the ROH World Championship | This was Tyler Black's last match in ROH before signing with WWE. |
| 19 | WWE: Raw; SmackDown | Night of Champions | Rosemont | Randy Orton defeated Sheamus (c), Wade Barrett, John Cena, Edge, and Chris Jericho in a Six-Pack Challenge to win the WWE Championship | Last event of Women's Championship |
(c) – denotes defending champion(s)

=== October ===
| Date | Promotion(s) | Event | Location | Main event | Notes |
|---|---|---|---|---|---|
| 1 | AAA | Héroes Inmortales IV | Ciudad Madero, Tamaulipas, Mexico | Legado AAA (Dark Cuervo, Dark Ozz, Heavy Metal and La Parka) defeated La Sociedad (Electroshock, El Zorro, Hernandez and L.A. Park) | |
| 3 | CMLL | CMLL 77th Anniversary Show | Mexico City, Mexico | 14-man elimination steel cage match | |
| 3 | WWE: Raw; SmackDown | Hell in a Cell | Dallas | Kane (c) defeated The Undertaker in Hell in a Cell match to retain the World Heavyweight Championship | |
| 10 | TNA | Bound for Glory | Daytona Beach | Jeff Hardy defeated Mr. Anderson and Kurt Angle in a Three-way match to win the vacant TNA World Heavyweight Championship; Since Angle lost, he had to retire. | |
| 11 | NJPW | Destruction | Tokyo | Satoshi Kojima defeated Togi Makabe (c) in a Singles match to win the IWGP Heavyweight Championship | |
| 15 | CMLL | CMLL Entre el Cielo y el Infierno | Mexico City | Charly Manson defeated Negro Casas | |
| 24 | WWE: Raw; SmackDown | Bragging Rights | Minneapolis | Wade Barrett defeated Randy Orton (c) by disqualification in a Singles match for the WWE Championship; Had Barrett lost, John Cena would have been fired. | Team SmackDown won for the second time in a row in a 14-man elimination tag team match This was The Undertaker's last appearance as a full-time wrestler |
(c) – denotes defending champion(s)

=== November ===
| Date | Promotion(s) | Event | Location | Main event |
|---|---|---|---|---|
| 7 | TNA | Turning Point | Orlando | Jeff Hardy (c) defeated Matt Morgan in a Single match to retain the TNA World Heavyweight Championship |
| 21 | WWE: Raw; SmackDown | Survivor Series | Miami | Randy Orton (c) defeated Wade Barrett in a Singles match to retain the WWE Championship with John Cena as special guest referee Since Orton won, Cena was fired. Had Barrett won, Cena would be free from Nexus |
(c) – denotes defending champion(s)

=== December ===
| Date | Promotion(s) | Event | Location | Main event |
|---|---|---|---|---|
| 3 | CMLL | Sin Piedad | Nuevo Laredo, Tamaulipas, Mexico | Rey Bucanero defeated Mr. Águila in a Best two-out-of-three falls Lucha de Apuestas, hair vs. hair match |
| 5 | AAA | Guerra de Titanes | Guadalajara, Jalisco | Six-man tag team steel cage Lucha de Apuestas, hair-vs.-mask match |
| 5 | TNA | Final Resolution | Orlando | Jeff Hardy (c) defeated Matt Morgan in a No Disqualification match to retain the TNA World Heavyweight Championship with Mr. Anderson as special guest referee |
| 11 | WWE: Raw; SmackDown | Tribute to the Troops | Fort Hood, Texas | John Cena, Rey Mysterio and Randy Orton defeated Alberto Del Rio, Wade Barrett and The Miz |
| 18 | ROH | Final Battle | New York City | El Generico defeated Kevin Steen in an Unsanctioned Fight Without Honor for El Generico's mask vs. Kevin Steen leaving ROH |
| 19 | WWE: Raw; SmackDown | TLC: Tables, Ladders & Chairs | Houston | John Cena defeated Wade Barrett in a Chairs match |
(c) – denotes defending champion(s)

== Accomplishments and tournaments ==
=== AAA ===
| Accomplishment | Winner | Date won | Notes |
|---|---|---|---|
| Rey de Reyes | Chessman | March 12 | |

=== DDT ===
| Accomplishment | Winner | Date won | Notes |
|---|---|---|---|
| Young Drama Cup | Soma Takao | November 28 | |

=== Ring of Honor ===
| Accomplishment | Winner | Date won | Notes |
|---|---|---|---|
| ROH World Television Championship Tournament | Eddie Edwards | March 5 | |

=== TNA ===
| Accomplishment | Winner | Date won | Notes |
|---|---|---|---|
| 8 Card Stud Tournament | D'Angelo Dinero | April 18 | |
| TNA Tag Team Championship Series | Beer Money, Inc. (James Storm and Robert Roode) | July 11 | |
| TNA World Tag Team Championship #1 Contenders Tournament | Desmond Wolfe and Magnus | July 27 | |
| TNA World Heavyweight Championship Tournament | Jeff Hardy | October 10 | |
| TNA Knockouts Tag Team Championship Tournament | The Beautiful People (Angelina Love and Velvet Sky) | December 23 | |

=== WWE ===
| Accomplishment | Winner | Date won | Notes |
|---|---|---|---|
| ECW Homecoming Tournament | Ezekiel Jackson | January 12 | Last eliminated Kane to win the battle royal, which was the final of the tournament to earn an ECW Championship match at the Royal Rumble. Jackson, however, was unsuccessful in winning the title from Christian at the event. |
| Royal Rumble | Edge | January 31 | Winner received their choice of a championship match for either Raw's WWE Championship, SmackDown's World Heavyweight Championship, or the ECW Championship at WrestleMania XXVI; Edge last eliminated John Cena to win and chose to challenge for his own brand's World Heavyweight Championship, but was unsuccessful against Chris Jericho at the event. |
| WWE Divas Championship Tournament | Maryse | February 22 | Defeated Gail Kim in the tournament final to win the vacant WWE Divas Championship; previous champion Melina vacated the title after suffering a legitimate injury. |
| Money in the Bank ladder match | Jack Swagger | March 28 | This was the final Money in the Bank ladder match to happen at WrestleMania, with all future matches held at the annual namesake pay-per-view. Swagger from Raw defeated Christian, Dolph Ziggler, Drew McIntyre, Evan Bourne, Kane, Kofi Kingston, Matt Hardy, Montel Vontavious Porter, and Shelton Benjamin to win a world championship match contract; Swagger cashed in and won SmackDown's World Heavyweight Championship from Chris Jericho on the April 2 episode of SmackDown and was in turn transferred to SmackDown. |
| WWE Intercontinental Championship Tournament | Kofi Kingston | May 14 | Defeated Christian in the tournament final to win the vacant Intercontinental Championship after previous champion Drew McIntyre had been (kayfabe) fired by SmackDown General Manager Theodore Long; however, the decision was overturned by Mr. McMahon. Kingston subsequently faced and defeated McIntyre for the title at Over the Limit. |
| NXT season 1 | Wade Barrett | June 10 | Defeated David Otunga in the final to win a WWE contract and a championship match, which he invoked for the WWE Championship at Night of Champions, but was unsuccessful in the six-pack challenge, though did eliminate champion John Cena from the match. |
| Money in the Bank ladder match (SmackDown) | Kane | July 18 | Defeated Big Show, Christian, Cody Rhodes, Dolph Ziggler, Drew McIntyre, Kofi Kingston, and Matt Hardy to win a World Heavyweight Championship match contract; later that same night, Kane cashed in the contract and won the title from Rey Mysterio, who had just won the title from Jack Swagger. |
| Money in the Bank ladder match (Raw) | The Miz | July 18 | Defeated Chris Jericho, Edge, Evan Bourne, John Morrison, Mark Henry, Randy Orton, and Ted DiBiase to win a WWE Championship match contract. Miz cashed in his contract and won the title from Orton on the November 22 episode of Raw after Orton had just retained the title over Wade Barrett. |
| NXT season 2 | Kaval | August 31 | Defeated Michael McGillicutty and Alex Riley in the final to win a WWE contract and a championship match, which he invoked for the Intercontinental Championship at Survivor Series, but was unsuccessful against Dolph Ziggler at the event. |
| King of the Ring | Sheamus | November 29 | Defeated John Morrison in the tournament final to win and be crowned King of the Ring. Sheamus subsequently changed his ring name to King Sheamus. |
| NXT season 3 | Kaitlyn | November 30 | Defeated Naomi in the final to win a WWE contract. |

==== WWE Hall of Fame ====
| Category | Inductee | Inducted by |
|---|---|---|
| Individual | Ted DiBiase | Ted DiBiase Jr. and Brett DiBiase |
| Individual | Antonio Inoki | Stan Hansen |
| Individual | Wendi Richter | Roddy Piper |
| Individual | Maurice "Mad Dog" Vachon | Pat Patterson |
| Individual | Gorgeous George | Dick Beyer |
| Individual | Stu Hart | Bret Hart |
| Celebrity | Bob Uecker | Dick Ebersol |

==== Slammy Awards ====
| Poll | Winner |
|---|---|
| Best Performance By a Winged Specimen | Raw Chicken |
| Best Use of Exercise Equipment | Rosa Mendes uses a Shake-Weight |
| Most Menacing Haircut | Tyler Reks |
| Best Family Values | Kane beats up Jack Swagger, Sr. |
| Superstar/Diva Most in Need of Make-up | Sheamus |
| Cole in Your Stocking | Daniel Bryan beats up Michael Cole on NXT |
| Outstanding Achievement of Baby Oil Application | Cody Rhodes |
| Frequent Tweeter Award | Goldust |
| Best WWE.com Exclusive TV Show | NXT |
| Most Annoying Catchphrase | Zack Ryder for "Woo Woo Woo You Know It." |
| Shocker of the Year | The debut of The Nexus |
| Despicable Me Award | CM Punk sings "Happy Birthday" to Rey Mysterio's daughter |
| Guest Star Shining Moment of the Year | Pee-wee Herman vs. The Miz |
| Holy %&@*# Move of the Year | John Cena sends Batista through the stage with an Attitude Adjustment |
| WWE Universe Fan Reaction of the Year | "Angry Miz Girl" Cayley |
| "Oh Snap" Meltdown of the Year | Edge destroys the Raw GM's computer |
| Knucklehead Moment of the Year | Lay-Cool (Layla El and Michelle McCool) gets beaten by Mae Young |
| "And I Quote ..." Line of the Year | Michael Cole |
| WWE Diva of the Year | Michelle McCool |
| WWE Moment of the Year | The Undertaker vs. Shawn Michaels in Michaels' final match |
| Superstar of the Year | John Cena |

== Awards and honors ==
=== Pro Wrestling Illustrated ===
| Category | Winner |
|---|---|
| PWI Wrestler of the Year | Randy Orton |
| PWI Tag Team of the Year | The Motor City Machine Guns (Alex Shelley and Chris Sabin) |
| PWI Match of the Year | The Undertaker vs. Shawn Michaels (WrestleMania XXVI) |
| PWI Feud of the Year | The Nexus vs. WWE |
| PWI Most Popular Wrestler of the Year | Randy Orton |
| PWI Most Hated Wrestler of the Year | The Nexus |
| PWI Comeback of the Year | Rob Van Dam |
| PWI Most Improved Wrestler of the Year | D'Angelo Dinero |
| PWI Most Inspirational Wrestler of the Year | Shawn Michaels |
| PWI Rookie of the Year | David Otunga |
| PWI Woman of the Year | Michelle McCool |
| PWI Lifetime Achievement | Killer Kowalski |

=== Wrestling Observer Newsletter ===
==== Wrestling Observer Newsletter Hall of Fame ====
Inductee
Chris Jericho
Rey Mysterio, Jr.
Wladek Zbyszko

==== Wrestling Observer Newsletter awards ====
| Category | Winner |
|---|---|
| Wrestler of the Year | John Cena |
| Most Outstanding | Daniel Bryan |
| Feud of the Year | El Generico vs. Kevin Steen |
| Tag Team of the Year | The Kings of Wrestling (Chris Hero and Claudio Castagnoli) |
| Most Improved | Sheamus |

== Title changes ==
=== AAA ===
AAA Mega Championship
Incoming champion – El Mesias
| Date | Winner | Event/Show | Note(s) |
| March 12 | Electroshock | Rey de Reyes | Three-way match, also involving Mr. Anderson. |
| June 6 | Dr. Wagner, Jr. | Triplemania XVIII | |
| December 5 | El Zorro | Guerra de Titanes | |

AAA World Mini-Estrella Championship
Incoming champion – Mini Abismo Negro
| Date | Winner | Event/Show | Note(s) |
| June 6 | Octagoncito | Triplemanía XVIII | |

AAA World Cruiserweight Championship
Incoming champion – Xtreme Tiger
| Date | Winner | Event/Show | Note(s) |
| June 6 | Jack Evans | Triplemanía XVIII | |

AAA World Tag Team Championship
Incoming champions – La Hermandad 187 (Joe Líder and Nicho el Millonario)
| Date | Winner | Event/Show | Note(s) |
| March 19 | La Legión Extranjera (Taiji Ishimori and Takeshi Morishima) | AAA Sin Límite TV Taping | |
| May 23 | Atsushi Aoki and Go Shiozaki | NOAH Navigation With Breeze – Day 1 | |
| June 6 | Los Maniacos (Silver King and Último Gladiador) | NOAH Navigation With Breeze – Day 1 | |

AAA World Mixed Tag Team Championship
Incoming champions – Aero Star and Faby Apache
| Date | Winner | Event/Show | Note(s) |
| July 2 | La Legión Extranjera (Alex Koslov and Christina Von Eerie) | AAA Television Taping | |
| October 1 | Faby Apache and Pimpinela Escarlata | Héroes Inmortales IV | |

=== NJPW ===
IWGP Heavyweight Championship
Incoming champion – Shinsuke Nakamura
| Date | Winner | Event/Show | Note(s) |
| May 3 | Togi Makabe | Wrestling Dontaku | |
| October 11 | Satoshi Kojima | Destruction '10 | |

IWGP Tag Team Championship
Incoming champions – Team 3D (Brother Devon and Brother Ray)
| Date | Winner | Event/Show | Note(s) |
| January 4 | No Limit (Tetsuya Naito and Yujiro Takahashi) | Wrestle Kingdom IV | This was a three-way hardcore match, which also included Bad Intentions (Giant Bernard and Karl Anderson). |
| May 3 | Seigigun (Wataru Inoue and Yuji Nagata) | Wrestling Dontaku | This was a three-way match, which also included Bad Intentions (Giant Bernard and Karl Anderson). |
| June 19 | Bad Intentions (Giant Bernard and Karl Anderson) | Dominion 6.19 | This was a three-way elimination match, which also included No Limit (Tetsuya Naito and Yujiro Takahashi). |

IWGP Junior Heavyweight Championship
Incoming champion – Tiger Mask
| Date | Winner | Event/Show | Note(s) |
| January 4 | Naomichi Marufuji | Wrestle Kingdom IV | |
| June 19 | Prince Devitt | Dominion 6.19 | |

IWGP Junior Heavyweight Tag Team Championship
Incoming champions – Apollo 55 (Prince Devitt and Ryusuke Taguchi)
| Date | Winner | Event/Show | Note(s) |
| April 21 | Vacated | – | Title held up after the championship was not defended for 30 days. |
| May 8 | El Samurai and Koji Kanemoto | Super J Tag Tournament 1st | Defeated Apollo 55 (Prince Devitt and Ryusuke Taguchi) in the finals of an eight-team tournament to win the vacant title. |
| July 19 | Apollo 55 (Prince Devitt and Ryusuke Taguchi) | Circuit2010 New Japan Soul | |

=== ROH ===
ROH World Championship
Incoming champion – Austin Aries
| Date | Winner | Event/Show | Note(s) |
| February 13 | Tyler Black | 8th Anniversary Show | |
| September 11 | Roderick Strong | Glory By Honor IX | |

ROH World Television Championship
(Title created)
| Date | Winner | Event/Show | Note(s) |
| March 5 | Eddie Edwards | Ring of Honor Wrestling | |
| December 10 | Christopher Daniels | Ring of Honor Wrestling | |

ROH World Tag Team Championship
Incoming champions – The Briscoe Brothers (Jay and Mark Briscoe)
| Date | Winner | Event/Show | Note(s) |
| April 3 | The Kings of Wrestling (Chris Hero and Claudio Castagnoli) | The Big Bang! | |

=== TNA ===
TNA World Heavyweight Championship
Incoming champion – A.J. Styles
| Date | Winner | Event/Show | Note(s) |
| April 19 | Rob Van Dam | Impact! | |
| August 10 (aired August 19) | Vacated | Impact! | The title was vacated due to Rob Van Dam suffering a storyline injury. |
| October 10 | Jeff Hardy | Bound for Glory | Hardy defeated Kurt Angle and Mr. Anderson in a three-way tournament final to win the vacant title. Per the pre-match stipulation, Angle (in storyline) was forced to retire |

TNA X Division Championship
Incoming champion – Amazing Red
| Date | Winner | Event/Show | Note(s) |
| January 19 | Douglas Williams | Impact! | |
| April 18 | Vacated | Lockdown | |
| April 18 | Kazarian | Lockdown | |
| May 16 | Douglas Williams | Sacrifice | |
| September 6 | Jay Lethal | Impact! | |
| September 25 | Amazing Red | Live event | |
| November 7 | Robbie E | Turning Point | |
| December 7 | Jay Lethal | Impact! | |

TNA World Tag Team Championship
Incoming champions – The British Invasion (Brutus Magnus and Doug Williams)
| Date | Winner | Event/Show | Note(s) |
| January 17 | Hernandez and Matt Morgan | Genesis | |
| April 5 | Matt Morgan | Impact! | |
| May 4 | The Band (Eric Young, Kevin Nash and Scott Hall) | Impact! | |
| June 14 | Vacated | Impact! | |
| July 11 | The Motor City Machine Guns (Alex Shelley and Chris Sabin) | Victory Road | |

TNA Knockouts Tag Team Championship
Incoming champions – Sarita and Taylor Wilde
| Date | Winner | Event/Show | Note(s) |
| January 4 | Awesome Kong and Hamada | Impact! | |
| March 8 | Vacated | Impact! | |
| March 8 | The Beautiful People (Lacey Von Erich, Madison Rayne and Velvet Sky) | Impact! | |
| August 5 | Hamada and Taylor Wilde | Impact! | |
| December 9 | Vacated | Impact! | |

TNA Women's Knockout Championship
Incoming champion – Tara
| Date | Winner | Event/Show | Note(s) |
| January 4 | ODB | Impact! | |
| January 17 | Tara | Genesis | |
| April 5 | Angelina Love | Impact! | |
| April 18 | Madison Rayne | Lockdown | |
| July 11 | Angelina Love | Victory Road | |
| July 13 | Madison Rayne | Impact! | |
| August 9 | Angelina Love | Impact!: The Whole F'n Show | |
| October 10 | Tara | Bound for Glory | |
| October 11 | Madison Rayne | Impact! | |

TNA Television Championship
Incoming champion – Douglas Williams
| Date | Winner | Event/Show | Note(s) |
| January 27 | Rob Terry | Live event | |
| July 13 | A.J. Styles | Impact! | |
| December 5 | Douglas Williams | Final Resolution | |

=== WWE ===
– Raw
– SmackDown
– ECW

Raw and SmackDown each had a world championship, a secondary championship, and a women's championship, while the male tag team championship was shared across all the brands. ECW only had a world championship.

WWE Championship
Incoming champion – Sheamus
| Date | Winner | Event/Show | Note(s) |
| February 21 | John Cena | Elimination Chamber | Elimination Chamber match, also involving Triple H, Randy Orton, Ted DiBiase, and Kofi Kingston. |
| February 21 | Batista | Elimination Chamber | Mr. McMahon granted SmackDown wrestler Batista a championship match with John Cena after Cena won the Elimination Chamber match. Batista then transferred to the Raw roster after winning the title. |
| March 28 | John Cena | WrestleMania XXVI | |
| June 20 | Sheamus | Fatal 4-Way | Fatal four-way match, also involving Edge and Randy Orton. |
| September 19 | Randy Orton | Night of Champions | Six-Pack Elimination Challenge, also involving Edge, John Cena, Chris Jericho, and Wade Barrett. |
| November 22 | The Miz | Monday Night Raw | Cashed in his Money in the Bank contract after Randy Orton had successfully defended the WWE Championship against Wade Barrett. |

World Heavyweight Championship
Incoming champion – The Undertaker
| Date | Winner | Event/Show | Note(s) |
| February 21 | Chris Jericho | Elimination Chamber | Elimination Chamber match, also involving John Morrison, R-Truth, CM Punk, and Rey Mysterio. |
| March 30 (aired April 2) | Jack Swagger | SmackDown | Cashed in his Money in the Bank contract. Jack Swagger transferred from Raw to SmackDown upon winning the title. |
| June 20 | Rey Mysterio | Fatal 4-Way | Fatal four-way match, also involving Big Show and CM Punk. The championship was referred to as the "World Championship" due to Mysterio not being a heavyweight. |
| July 18 | Kane | Money in the Bank | Cashed in his Money in the Bank contract that he had won earlier that same night. |
| December 19 | Edge | TLC: Tables, Ladders & Chairs | Fatal four-way Tables, Ladders, and Chairs match, also involving Alberto Del Rio and Rey Mysterio. |

ECW Championship
Incoming champion – Christian
| Date | Winner | Event/Show | Note(s) |
| February 16 | Ezekiel Jackson | ECW | Extreme rules match |
| February 16 | Retired | ECW | Final broadcast of ECW. The title was retired due to the ECW brand being discontinued. |

WWE United States Championship
Incoming champion – The Miz
| Date | Winner | Event/Show | Note(s) |
| May 17 | Bret Hart | Monday Night Raw | No disqualification, no countout match |
| May 24 | Vacated | Monday Night Raw | Vacated when Bret Hart became the Raw General Manager. |
| May 24 | R-Truth | Monday Night Raw | Defeated The Miz to win the vacant title. |
| June 14 | The Miz | Monday Night Raw | Fatal four-way match, also involving John Morrison and Zack Ryder |
| September 19 | Daniel Bryan | Night of Champions | |

WWE Intercontinental Championship
Incoming champion – Drew McIntyre
| Date | Winner | Event/Show | Note(s) |
| May 23 | Kofi Kingston | Over the Limit | |
| July 28 (aired August 6) | Dolph Ziggler | SmackDown | |

WWE Divas Championship
Incoming champion – Melina
| Date | Winner | Event/Show | Note(s) |
| January 4 | Vacated | Monday Night Raw | Vacated the title after Melina sustained a torn anterior cruciate ligament. |
| February 22 | Maryse | Monday Night Raw | Defeated Gail Kim in a tournament final to win the vacant title. |
| April 12 | Eve Torres | Monday Night Raw | |
| June 20 | Alicia Fox | Fatal 4-Way | Fatal four-way match, also involving Gail Kim and Maryse. Fox pinned Maryse to win the championship. |
| August 15 | Melina | SummerSlam | |
| September 19 | Michelle McCool | Night of Champions | Lumberjill match where the WWE Women's Championship was unified with the Divas Championship. The title was briefly referred to as the "Unified Divas Championship", keeping the lineage of the Divas Championship whilst the Women's Championship was retired. Layla was unofficially the co-champion during this reign; she defended the championship in McCool's place on some occasions. |
After unification with the WWE Women's Championship, the WWE Divas Championship was no longer brand exclusive.
| November 21 | Natalya | Survivor Series | Handicap match, also involving Layla as Michelle McCool's tag team partner. |

WWE Women's Championship
Incoming champion – Michelle McCool
| Date | Winner | Event/Show | Note(s) |
| January 31 | Mickie James | Royal Rumble | |
| February 23 (aired February 26) | Michelle McCool | SmackDown | Vickie Guerrero served as the special guest referee. |
| April 25 | Beth Phoenix | Extreme Rules | Extreme Makeover match |
| May 11 (aired May 14) | Layla | SmackDown | LayCool (Michelle McCool and Layla) defeated Beth Phoenix in a Texas Tornado Handicap match when Layla pinned Phoenix. Michelle McCool was unofficially the co-champion during this reign; she defended the championship in Layla's place on some occasions, but was not officially recognized as the title holder. |
| September 19 | Retired | Night of Champions | Retired after Michelle McCool, who had been unofficially co-reigning with Layla, defeated Melina to unify the Women's Championship and WWE Divas Championship. |

Unified WWE Tag Team Championship^{1} (World Tag Team Championship and WWE Tag Team Championship)
Incoming champions – D-Generation X (Triple H and Shawn Michaels)
| Date | Winner | Event/Show | Note(s) |
| February 8 | ShoMiz (Big Show and The Miz) | Monday Night Raw | Triple threat elimination match, also involving The Straight Edge Society (CM Punk and Luke Gallows). |
| April 26 | The Hart Dynasty (David Hart Smith and Tyson Kidd) | Monday Night Raw | |
On August 16, the World Tag Team Championship was decommissioned in favor of continuing the WWE Tag Team Championship's lineage, which dropped the "unified" moniker.
| September 19 | Cody Rhodes and Drew McIntyre | Night of Champions | Tag Team Turmoil, also involving The Usos (Jey and Jimmy Uso), Santino Marella and Vladimir Kozlov, and Evan Bourne and Mark Henry. |
| October 24 | The Nexus (John Cena and David Otunga) | Bragging Rights | |
| October 25 | The Nexus (Heath Slater and Justin Gabriel) | Monday Night Raw | Wade Barrett kept the title within Nexus, but took out John Cena by ordering David Otunga to lie down purposely for a pinfall. |
| December 6 | Santino Marella and Vladimir Kozlov | Monday Night Raw | Fatal four-way tag team elimination match, also involving The Usos (Jey and Jimmy Uso) and Mark Henry and Yoshi Tatsu. |

1 Both titles were independently active, but were collectively defended on any brand as the Unified WWE Tag Team Championship.

Million Dollar Championship
(Title reactivated but not officially sanctioned)
| Date | Winner | Event/Show | Note(s) |
| April 5 | Ted DiBiase, Jr. | Monday Night Raw | Was given the championship by his father, Ted DiBiase |
| November 15 | Retired | Monday Night Raw | Title returned to his father, Ted DiBiase |

== Debuts ==
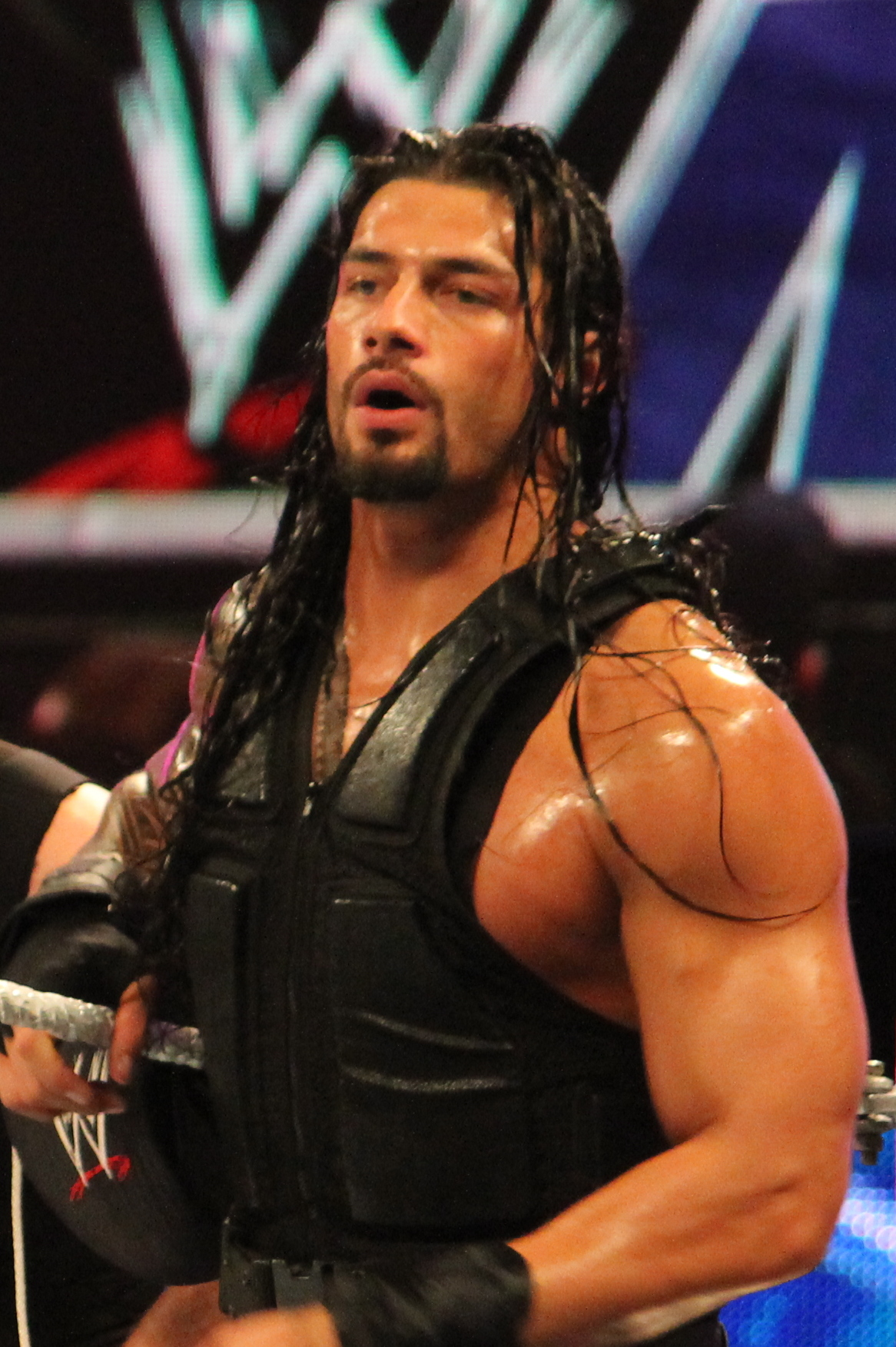
Roman Reigns

- Uncertain debut date

- Reby Sky

- January 21 – Toru
- February 19 – Parrow
- February 20 – Zelina Vega/Rosita
- February 28 – Yoshikazu Yokoyama
- March 14 – Kazuki Hirata
- March 21 – Sawako Shimono
- March 26 – Jessie Godderz
- April 29 – Sayaka Obihiro
- May 3 – Hiragi Kurumi
- May 15 – Fuma
- June 11 – Musashi
- July 18 – Moon Mizuki
- August 8 – Mercedes Mone
- August 19 – Roman Reigns
- September – Taya Valkyrie
- September 2 – Alex Lee
- September 7 – Kaitlyn
- October 16 – Shinichiro Tominaga
- November 21 – Mika Iida
- November 25 – Dralístico
- December – Shaul Guerrero
- December 11 – Sammy Guevara
- December 12 – Ruby Soho (wrestler)
- December 18 – Dennis Dullnig
- December 23 – masu-me
- December 25 – Mochi Miyagi

== Retirements ==
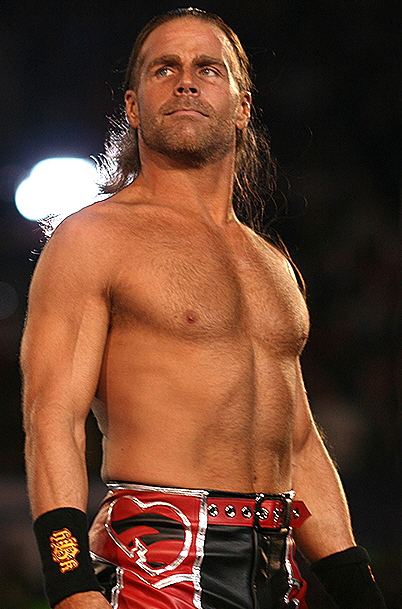
Shawn Michaels

- The Iron Sheik (1972–April 24, 2010)
- Chavo Guerrero Sr. (1970–2010)
- Ron Simmons (1986–2010)
- DJ Gabriel (2004 – 2010)
- Kamala (1978 – 2010)
- Kristal Marshall (December 2, 2005 – February 2010)
- Shawn Michaels (October 10, 1984 – March 28, 2010) (had a one-off match at Crown Jewel in 2018)
- Ray Gordy / Jesse Dalton / Slam Master J (2000 – April 23, 2010)
- Scott Hall (1984-June 2010, return to wrestle one match in 2016)
- Ricky Steamboat (1976-June 18, 2010, returned to wrestle one match in 2022)
- Abdullah the Butcher (1958 – October 9, 2010)
- Lacey Von Erich (September 15, 2007 – November 11, 2010)
- Mae Young (August 20, 1939 – November 15, 2010)
- Caylen Croft (2001 – November 19, 2010)
- Ashley Vance (June 22, 2010 – December 28, 2010)
- Kazumi Shimouma (September 16, 2007 – December 26, 2010)
- Tanny Mouse (October 7, 1994 – December 31, 2010)

== Deaths ==
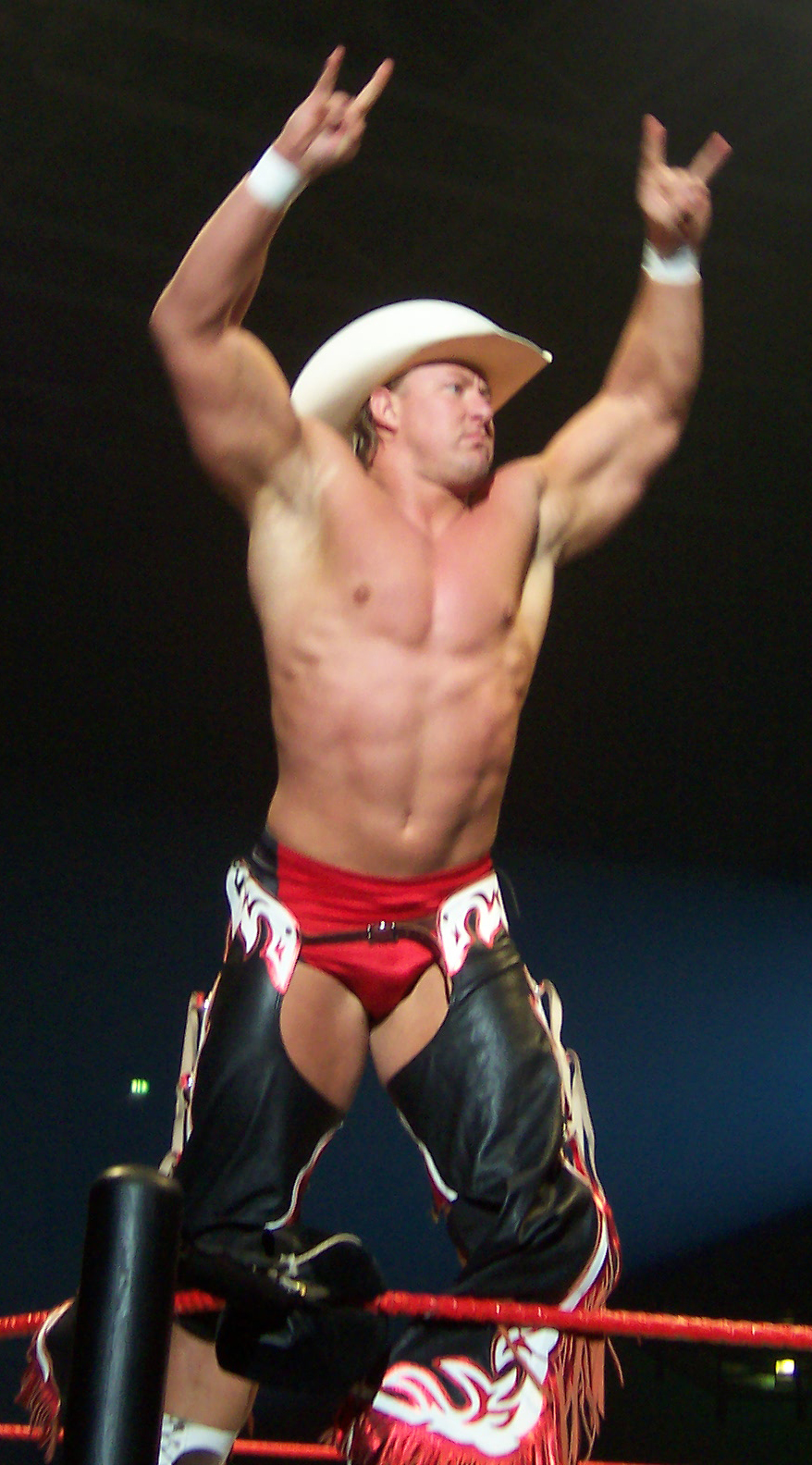
Lance Cade

- January 8 – Tony Halme, 47
- February 1 – Jack Brisco, 68
- March 4 - Angelo Poffo, 84
- March 8 - Jerry Valiant, 68
- March 11 - Sandy Scott, 75
- March 14 - Corsica Joe, 90
- March 20 – Mikel Scicluna, 80
- March 29 - Tom Burton, 48
- April 2 – Chris Kanyon, 40
- April 14 - Gene Kiniski, 81
- April 21 –
  - Mr. Hito, 67
  - George Grant, 83
- May 3:
  - Kinji Shibuya, 88
  - El Supremo (wrestler), 67
- May 15 - Andre Baker, 45
- May 24 - Rusher Kimura, 68
- June 7 - Rocket Monroe, 69
- June 12 – Grizzly Smith, 77
- June 18 - Trent Acid, 29
- June 24 - Toni Adams, 45
- July 2 - Steve Stanlee, 90
- August 13 – Lance Cade, 29
- August 19 - Ted Allen, 54
- August 20 - Skandor Akbar, 75
- August 27 -
  - Anton Geesink, 76
  - Tony Borne, 84
- August 28 - Kotetsu Yamamoto, 68
- August 30 – J. C. Bailey, 27
- September 10 – Mike Shaw, 53
- September 11 - La Fiera, 49
- September 22 – Giant González, 44
- October 6 - Gran Naniwa, 33
- October 23 - Michael Porter, 59
- October 30 - Édouard Carpentier, 84
- November 8 - Joe Higuchi, 81
- November 25 - Kantaro Hoshino, 67
- December 3 - Skip Young, 59
- December 4 - King Curtis Iaukea, 73
- December 15 - Hans Mortier, 85
- December 18 - Donn Lewin, 84

== See also ==
- List of NJPW pay-per-view events
- List of ROH pay-per-view events
- List of TNA pay-per-view events
- List of WWE pay-per-view events
