= No Surrender (2010) =

2010 Total Nonstop Action Wrestling pay-per-view event

- Promotional poster featuring Mr. Anderson
- Promotion: Total Nonstop Action Wrestling
- Date: September 5, 2010
- City: Orlando, Florida
- Venue: Impact Zone
- Attendance: 1,100

Pay-per-view chronology
← Previous; Hardcore Justice	Next → Bound for Glory

No Surrender chronology
← Previous; 2009	Next → 2011

The 2010 No Surrender was a professional wrestling pay-per-view event produced by Total Nonstop Action Wrestling (TNA), which took place on September 5, 2010 at the Impact Zone in Orlando, Florida. It was the sixth event under the No Surrender chronology and the ninth event of the 2010 TNA pay-per-view schedule.

In October 2017, with the launch of the Global Wrestling Network, the event became available to stream on demand.

== Storylines ==
Other on-screen personnel
Role:	Name:
Commentator	Mike Tenay
Commentator	Taz
Interviewer	Jeremy Borash
Interviewer	Lauren Thompson
Ring announcer	Jeremy Borash
Referee	Andrew Thomas
Referee	Brian Hebner
Referee	Earl Hebner
Referee	Frank Gastineau
Referee	Mickie James

No Surrender featured eight professional wrestling matches that involved different wrestlers from pre-existing scripted feuds and storylines. Wrestlers portrayed villains, heroes, or less distinguishable characters in the scripted events that built tension and culminated in a wrestling match or series of matches.

== Results ==
No.	Results	Stipulations	Times
1	The Motor City Machine Guns (Alex Shelley and Chris Sabin) (c) defeated Generation Me (Jeremy and Max Buck) (Note: Generation Me replaced London Brawling (Desmond Wolfe and Magnus), who were unable to attend the event due to a "personal issue" (in reality Wolfe's Hepatitis B diagnosis).)	Tag team match for the TNA World Tag Team Championship	12:51
2	Douglas Williams (c) defeated Sabu	Singles match for the TNA X Division Championship	11:13
3	Velvet Sky (with Angelina Love) defeated Madison Rayne (with Tara)	Singles match	04:43
4	Abyss defeated Rhino	Falls Count Anywhere match	12:40
5	Jeff Jarrett and Samoa Joe defeated Kevin Nash and Sting by technical submission	Tag team match	06:12
6	A.J. Styles defeated Tommy Dreamer	"I Quit" match	16:30
7	Jeff Hardy vs. Kurt Angle ended in a time limit draw	TNA World Heavyweight Championship tournament semi-final match Angle had lost, he would have retired from wrestling	30:00
8	Mr. Anderson defeated D'Angelo Dinero	TNA World Heavyweight Championship tournament semi-final match	17:22
(c) / – the champion(s) heading into the match

== See also ==
- 2010 in professional wrestling
