= Bound for Glory (2010) =

2010 Total Nonstop Action Wrestling pay-per-view event

- Promotional poster featuring Jeff Jarrett, Hulk Hogan, Sting, Mr. Anderson, Kurt Angle, and Jeff Hardy
- Promotion: Total Nonstop Action Wrestling
- Date: October 10, 2010
- City: Daytona Beach, Florida
- Venue: Ocean Center
- Attendance: 3,500

Pay-per-view chronology
← Previous; No Surrender	Next → Turning Point

TNA Bound for Glory chronology
← Previous; 2009	Next → 2011

The 2010 Bound for Glory was a professional wrestling pay-per-view event produced by Total Nonstop Action Wrestling (TNA), that took place on October 10, 2010, at the Ocean Center in Daytona Beach, Florida. It was the sixth annual event under the Bound for Glory chronology. Bound For Glory is considered to be the premiere event of the year for the Total Nonstop Action Wrestling company. The event was hyped as "10.10.10", a tagline surrounding a storyline that involved the mystery of "They", who would reveal themselves on the date, making the event remembered for the formation of Immortal.

Bound for Glory featured a supercard, a scheduling of more than one main event. Eight matches took place at the event. The main event featured Jeff Hardy defeating Mr. Anderson and Kurt Angle in a Three Way No Disqualification match for the vacant TNA World Heavyweight Championship. In other prominent matches, EV 2.0 (Tommy Dreamer, Raven, Rhino, Sabu, and Stevie Richards defeated Fortune (A.J. Styles, Kazarian, Matt Morgan, and Beer Money, Inc. (Robert Roode, and James Storm)) in a Lethal Lockdown match, Sting, Kevin Nash and D'Angelo Dinero beat Samoa Joe and Jeff Jarrett in a 3-on-2 Handicap match, Rob Van Dam defeated Abyss in a Monster's Ball match, and in the opening contest The Motor City Machine Guns (Chris Sabin and Alex Shelley) defeated Generation Me (Nick Jackson and Matt Jackson).

In October 2017, with the launch of the Global Wrestling Network, the event became available to stream on demand.

== Production ==
=== Background ===
The sixth annual Bound for Glory PPV spectacle was announced in a press release on June 25, 2010, where it was determined that the event would take place at the Ocean Center in Daytona Beach, Florida. In the press TNA President Dixie Carter stated that, "So many people come to ‘Bound For Glory' from around the world", and added, "We wanted a locale that would truly be a destination. With our biggest pay-per-view of the year and all the fan experiences we have planned, it will make ‘10.10.10' an unforgettable weekend". Tickets for the event went on sale on August 7, 2010. To celebrate the making of the event, a "Bound for Glory Block Party" was held on the same day at the Ocean Center and garnered a good turnout despite weather conditions. It featured fan interaction and an exclusive match.

In October, the final Impact! episode the week leading to Bound for Glory was themed "Before the Glory", a special live broadcast hyping the event. TNA also organized "Bound for Glory VIP Weekend", a series of fan interaction sessions over the event weekend, which allowed fans to get close and personal with their favorite stars for opportunities such as pictures, autographs and special interviews. In addition, the musical theme for Bound for Glory was selected to be "FOL" by The Smashing Pumpkins.

=== Storylines ===
Bound for Glory featured eight professional wrestling matches that involved different wrestlers from pre-existing scripted feuds and storylines. Wrestlers portrayed villains, heroes, or less distinguishable characters in the scripted events that built tension and culminated in a wrestling match or series of matches.

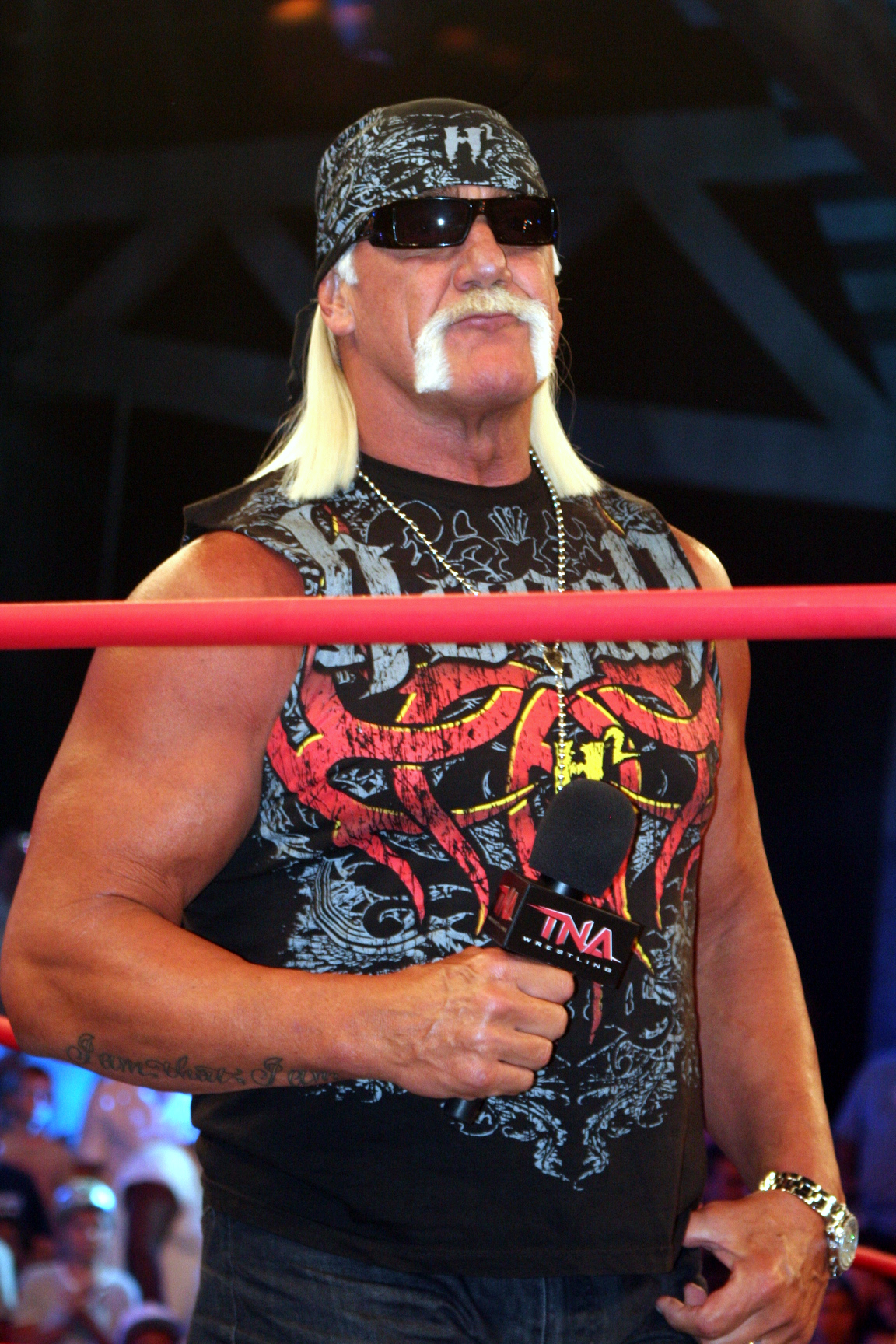
Hulk Hogan in July 2010.

The development of the "10.10.10" angle built over a year was centered on the mystery of “They”, leading to a 3-on-2 Handicap match featuring Jeff Jarrett and Samoa Joe facing Sting, Kevin Nash and D'Angelo Dinero. In October 2009, Hulk Hogan and Eric Bischoff came on board as business partners of TNA President Dixie Carter to take over the on-screen operations of TNA beginning with the new year. Having to earn their spots in the company like everyone else, TNA Founder Jeff Jarrett and former Executive Shareholder Mick Foley both engaged in issues with Bischoff. Acting on his own accord, Bischoff often feuded with Foley and forced Jarrett to work humiliating jobs backstage such as flipping burgers, cleaning restrooms, and placing Jarrett in unfavorable matches. In February, Hogan offered guidance to a neurotically unstable Abyss and this new friendship uplifted Abyss when Hogan gave him his Hall of Fame ring and vowed to make him a “god of wrestling”. In March, Sting attacked Hogan and Abyss, turning heel in the process due to suspicion of Hogan and Bischoff. After Foley lost a Career-Threatening match against Jarrett set up by Bischoff, where the loser was fired as a result, Hogan ordered Bischoff to lay off of Jarrett. At Lockdown, on April 18, Bischoff turned face helping Team Hogan, which included Jarrett, pick up the victory defeating Team Flair. Subsequently, Sting raised his inquisition of Hogan and Bischoff after he was ranked number one by the TNA Championship Committee in the top 10 rankings for a shot at the TNA World Title. By June, Abyss turned heel leading to heated confrontations with Hogan, revealing he was controlled by an entity known as “They”, who he said was coming to TNA on the date of 10.10.10. For costing him his World Title shot on June 13 at Slammiversary, Sting retaliated against Jarrett, resulting in a 30-day suspension without pay by Dixie Carter, who ignored his warnings about Hogan and Bischoff being up to a conspiracy. In August, Sting returned with nWo Wolfpac face paint and helped Kevin Nash, who supported him through the suspension, beat down Hogan, Bischoff and Jarrett. In September, Samoa Joe joined forces with Jarrett in his feud with Sting and Nash, who were later joined by D'Angelo Dinero. Sting, Nash and Dinero would all eventually uncover inside information from Bischoff's assistant, Ms. Tessmacher, that suggested Hogan and Bischoff had been planning something all along. At the end of the month, Sting claimed his good-vs-evil battle with Hogan from WCW was still ongoing and challenged Jarrett, Joe and Hogan to square off with him, Nash and Dinero on October 10 at Bound for Glory. However, due to legitimate back injuries over the years plaguing his body, Hogan underwent surgery and was subject to intensive care, rendering him unable to accept his part in the match as revealed in October. Thus, Bischoff arranged for Joe and Jarrett to take on Sting, Nash and Dinero in a Handicap match.

The primary match heading into Bound for Glory surrounded Jeff Hardy, Kurt Angle and Mr. Anderson, who competed in a No Disqualification match for the vacant TNA World Heavyweight Championship. Angle, who returned from a hiatus, was ranked number two by the TNA Championship Committee in the first top 10 rankings, which listed the top contenders for the World Title. However, Angle pulled out of his top 10 ranking position to begin at the bottom in an effort to prove himself, claiming he would retire if he lost a match during his title hunt. On the August 12 Whole F'N Show edition of Impact!, then-TNA World Heavyweight Champion Rob Van Dam sustained multiple severe storyline injuries from a brutal attack by Abyss, forcing him to surrender the title, as seen the next week when vacated by Executive Producer Eric Bischoff. As a result, Bischoff announced a tournament between the top eight contenders, with the finals scheduled to occur at Bound for Glory. That same night, Jeff Hardy, Mr. Anderson, Kurt Angle, and D'Angelo Dinero won their tournament quarterfinal matches. At No Surrender, Hardy and Angle fought to a no contest in their semifinals match, but Anderson defeated Dinero in the main event to advance. On the September 16 edition of Impact!, Bischoff announced a three-way match for Bound for Glory on October 10 between Hardy, Angle and Anderson, but it was overruled by TNA President Dixie Carter pitting Angle and Hardy in a rematch that night. When the match ended in an indecisive double pinfall, Bischoff once again announced the Three Way match for Bound for Glory against Carter's wishes.

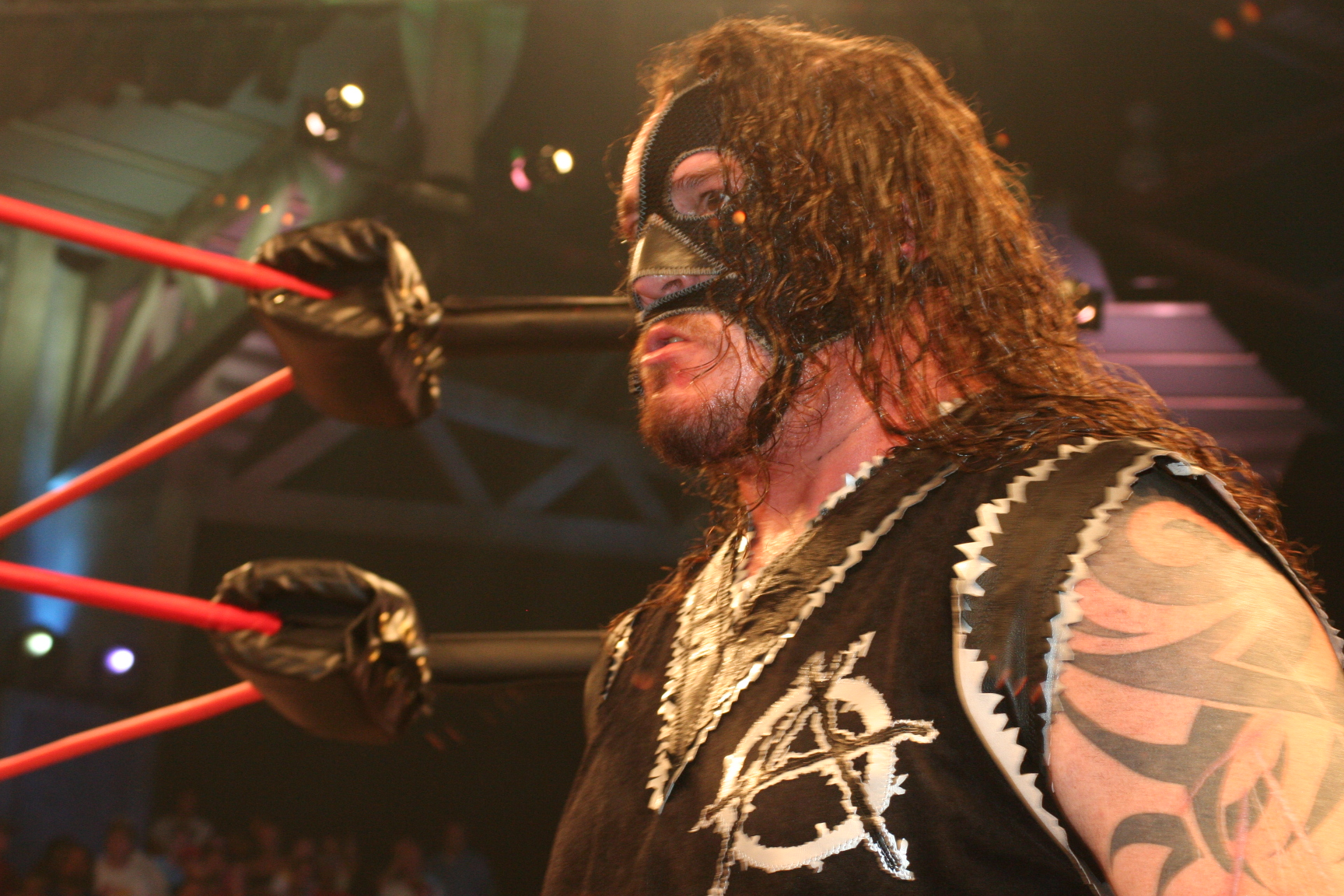
Abyss, who warned about the emergence of "They" and their arrival on 10.10.10 at Bound for Glory.

A top feud heading into Bound for Glory was Rob Van Dam seeking revenge against Abyss in a Monster's Ball match. For weeks, ECW alumni surfaced by repeatedly appearing in the stands of the Impact Zone, and on the July 15 edition of Impact, then-TNA World Heavyweight Champion Van Dam reunited with his longtime co-employees from the defunct promotion, who saved him from an onslaught by Abyss. On the August 12 special edition of Impact, named the Whole F'N Show, Van Dam defended his title against Abyss in a Stairway to Janice match. Later in the night, Van Dam and the ECW alumni, dubbed EV 2.0, were attacked by Abyss and Fortune respectively. The attack on Van Dam was severely brutal, sidelining him with serious storyline injuries, and forcing him to relinquish the World Title. He made his resurfacing on the September 16 edition of Impact via telephone interview, where he announced he was returning to the Impact Zone the following week against his doctor's orders. On that week's show, Van Dam confronted Abyss referencing that his doctors said he would be cleared for 10.10.10 and demanded a match against Abyss at Bound for Glory, which Bischoff agreed to sanction. Two weeks later, Abyss suggested that their encounter at the event be a Monster's Ball match. On the October 7 episode of Impact named "Before the Glory", when Abyss was fated to be fired by Bischoff for mishandling TNA President Dixie Carter, Van Dam threatened to quit the company if his chance slipped to face Abyss at Bound for Glory and so, Carter followed through and quickly signed papers for the firing of Abyss the day after the pay-per-view.

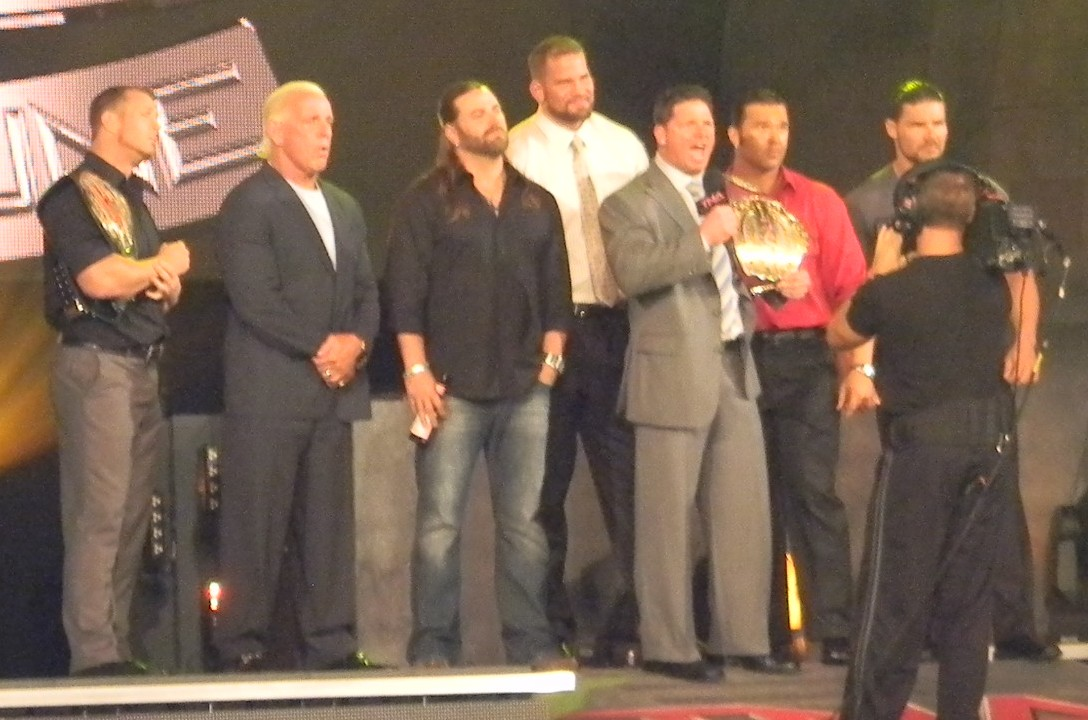
Fourtune in August 2010

Fortune (A.J. Styles, Kazarian, Matt Morgan, Robert Roode, and James Storm, all accompanied by Ric Flair) versus EV 2.0 (Tommy Dreamer, Raven, Rhino, Sabu, and Stevie Richards, all accompanied by Mick Foley) was another feud entering Bound for Glory, who faced off in a Lethal Lockdown match. On the August 12 "Whole F'N Show" edition of Impact, EV 2.0, a group of ECW alumni who made appearances for the promotion, gave their farewell speech off the heels of their reunion themed pay per view on August 8 at Hardcore Justice, given to them by TNA President Dixie Carter. During that night, Fortune appeared and assaulted the entire group, with Ric Flair blaming Carter for the situation. The next week, Flair and Fortune made their contempt clear for the hardcore-based nature of their adversaries and did not appreciate them coming in for another shot at glory. That night, the feud between the two parties escalated when Carter clarified that she contracted all members of EV 2.0, who looked to avenge Van Dam. Foley who had recently returned during the EV 2.0 invasion and regretted getting Flair to join TNA, sparked a rivalry between the two. Meanwhile, Tommy Dreamer, who respected A.J. Styles until the week prior, challenged him to a match that night. Later in the night, Abyss helped Styles defeat Dreamer in a match that ended with a brawl between the two fighting groups. On the September 2 edition of Impact, Fortune competed with EV 2.0 in an 8-Man Elimination Tag; the match boiled down to Styles as the sole survivor battling Dreamer, and Styles winning the match for Fortune. At No Surrender, on September 5, A.J. Styles and Douglas Williams of Fortune defeated EV 2.0 members Dreamer and Sabu in individual matches. Weeks later, Dreamer, within the absence of the rest of his group, tried to call a truce, but Fortune refused and attacked him leading to Brian Kendrick unsuccessfully attempting to make the save. On the September 23 edition of Impact!, Styles prevailed over Sabu in a Ladder match for the man advantage (Fortune got to make the first entry) in the Lethal Lockdown match set up for the two groups to do combat at Bound for Glory. After EV 2.0 mounted some momentum the next week, Foley confronted Flair to resolve their differences by challenging him to a Last Man Standing match for the following week, where if Flair lost, he would have to kiss Foley's rear end. On the final week's Impact! before pay per view, Foley defeated Flair. Per the stipulation, Flair was to perform the embarrassing deed but Fortune attacked Foley prior to EV 2.0 arriving to the rescue.

The Knockouts feud consisted of Angelina Love defending the TNA Knockouts Championship against Tara, Madison Rayne and Velvet Sky. Since her return from an injury in June, Love focused on going after the Knockouts Title and Beautiful People, now composed of her partner, Velvet Sky along with Madison Rayne and newbie Lacey Von Erich. At Victory Road, on July 11, Love defeated Rayne for the Knockouts Title by disqualification — the result of a stipulation that was put in effect in case Sky or Erich interfered in the match, which appeared to be so. As it turned out, an unknown woman bodily disguised and wearing a motorcycle helmet attacked Love. Due to Rayne's recent attitude, actions and apparent affiliation with the mystery woman, Sky started to get into problems with her. On the July 22 episode of Impact, the Knockouts Title was returned to Rayne because it could not be confirmed if Sky or Erich were the mystery woman. On the August 5 edition of Impact, Sky and Erich lost their TNA Knockouts Tag Team Championship, when Rayne's and the mystery woman's interference backfired, causing Sky to depart from Beautiful People. The following week, Rayne lost the Knockouts Title to Love after Sky stopped the mystery woman from distracting Love during the match. Sky went on to reunite with Love the next week, and thereafter, found themselves feuding with Rayne and the mystery woman. On the September 2 edition of Impact, the mystery woman revealed herself as Tara, who lost a Career versus Title match against then-Knockouts Champion Rayne on May 16 at Sacrifice, with the reveal establishing Tara as a villainess. On the September 30 episode of Impact!, Ms. Tessmacher became the Knockouts General Manager in consequence of the division falling into disorder and had Rayne sign a waiver to allow Tara back as an active competitor. Tessmacher then set up a Four Way match between Tara, Love, Rayne and Sky for the Knockouts Title at Bound for Glory. The next week, the returning Mickie James announced she would be refereeing the match.

== Event ==
Other on-screen personnel
Role:	Name:
Commentator	Mike Tenay
Commentator	Taz
Interviewer	Jeremy Borash
Interviewer	Lauren Thompson
Ring announcer	Jeremy Borash
Referee	Andrew Thomas
Referee	Brian Hebner
Referee	Earl Hebner
Referee	Frank Gastineau
Referee	Mickie James

=== Preliminary matches ===
The opening match at Bound for Glory was Motor City Machine Guns (Alex Shelley and Chris Sabin) defending the TNA World Tag Team Championship against Generation Me (Jeremy Buck and Max Buck). In a highly athletic match, The Guns mostly took control of the first half of the match, and one highlight, was hitting double suicide dives on Generation Me outside the ring. The match got explosive and led to a back-and-forth pace with plenty high flying and high impact executions. In the end, Generation Me set up a double team move that involved Jeremy rolling up Shelley and Max on the top rope. Quickly, Sabin ran and sprung off Jeremy's back onto the top rope and hit a release German suplex on Max. The Guns later followed up with their signature Skull and Bones and a pinfall by Shelley to retain their titles.

The second match of the evening was Angelina Love defending the TNA Women's Knockout Championship against Tara, Velvet Sky and Madison Rayne with Mickie James as Special Guest Referee. During early stages, the match evolved into more of a tag team match of Rayne and Tara against Love and Sky. It broke down to an all-out beat down and during its finals moments, Tara went for the Widow's Peak on Sky, who countered pushing Tara into Rayne, who fell off the apron onto Love on the outside. Tara ended up reversing Sky's roll up into her own and won the match, becoming Knockouts Champion for the fourth time in her career. After the match, Rayne argued with Tara. When Mickie tried to fathom the issue, Rayne pushed her away. Mickie retaliated by grabbing her, and as Rayne went to strike her, Mickie blocked it and knocked her out, smiling at an upset Tara before leaving the ring.

The next match featured Ink Inc. (Jesse Neal and Shannon Moore) going up against Eric Young and Orlando Jordan. During his entrance, Young brought the so-called "TNA Rule Book" to the ring. A much playful Young played his shenanigans, such as assuming the referee's duties, turning on his partner to help Ink Inc and taking advice from the "TNA Rule Book" during the match. One comedic moment in the match, a match which displayed alternating offense, was where Ink Inc turned on Young and jerked him and Jordan front-and-back on the top rope. With Young still defecting to their side, Ink Inc eventually capitalized executing their Samoan drop-Mooregasm combination finisher. After the match, Young celebrated with Ink Inc in front of Jordan, who wasn't pleased.

Jay Lethal defended the TNA X Division Championship against Douglas Williams in the fourth and following contest. Williams dominated the match from a technical standpoint. On the defensive, Lethal constantly attempted to turn the tables, but Williams one-upped him. At one point, Williams almost won with the Chaos Theory out of the ring corner. In the end, Williams attempted a Hurricanrana off the top rope but Lethal reversed it into a sunset flip roll up on the canvas to retain the title. After the match, Lethal exited through the crowd and encountered an attack from Robbie E, who was accompanied by Cookie. Robbie attacked Lethal back to the ring and executed a jumping cutter on him. Robbie, with the X-Division Title, alleged that Lethal was an embarrassment to New Jersey and made his intentions clear that he was going to win the title.

=== Main event matches ===
Rob Van Dam faced off with Abyss in a Monster's Ball no rules match next. Before the match, Abyss cut a promo in the ring saying, for months, he had prophesied about the arrival of "They", and that the date was upon us, and would begin with the destruction of Van Dam and continue with the takeover. Van Dam, immediately after his entrance, attacked Abyss slugging him into a corner and followed up with kicks. Van Dam stayed on the offense until him and Abyss began to go back-and-forth. Two high impact spots were Van Dam performing the Van Daminator, a corner-to-corner missile dropkick into a barbed wire board that also hit Abyss, as well as, Abyss tossing a chair at Van Dam, who fell off the top rope and through a barbed wire board. Near the end, Van Dam nailed Abyss with his own brutal signature weapon named Janice and carried on to jump off the top rope with a Five-Star Frog Splash to gain the victory through pinfall. After the match, Abyss signaled for the camera and brought up 10.10.10 and said to get ready because him and "They" were coming.

In a three-on-two Handicap match, Sting, Kevin Nash and D'Angelo Dinero took on Jeff Jarrett and Samoa Joe next. Joe and Dinero began the action, sharing in on the striking offense. During that, Dinero hit a shoulder block and Joe later responded with a Belly to belly suplex. After Dinero tagged out to Sting, Joe found himself on the defensive taking a beating but making a comeback. When Joe was close to finally tagging in Jarrett, Jarrett jumped off the apron turning on him and abandoning the match. Inevitably, Joe was left to fend for himself against all three of his opponents. To end the match, Nash went on to hit the Jackknife on Joe and won the match after pinning.

Team 3D made an appearance to deliver their big announcement which was scheduled to take place at the event. After citing their accomplishments of the past that included being 23-time world tag team champions in all of professional wrestling, they praised TNA for taking pride in tag team wrestling and claimed they had the best division in the world. Then and there, Team 3D announced their retirement, but requested their final match be against TNA World Tag Team Champions, Motor City Machine Guns.

The penultimate match of the night was EV 2.0 (Tommy Dreamer, Raven, Rhino, Sabu, and Stevie Richards) accompanied by Mick Foley combating Fortune (A.J. Styles, Kazarian, Matt Morgan, Robert Roode, and James Storm) accompanied by manager Ric Flair in a Lethal Lockdown match. Flair and Foley wasted no time to get the first shots in on each other at ringside before all participants could reach to the ring. Due to entry at a timed interval, Kazarian and Richards initiated the match, and as things progressed, Kazarian started off with control in the early going but Richards took over for the most part after executing four neckbreakers all until Styles, who won the Lethal Lockdown advantage, came in to help Kazarian double team Richards. Next in was Dreamer who came in taking down Styles and Kazarian. Roode stormed in to turn the tables successfully and this allowed Styles to cause Dreamer to shed blood by raking his face against the cage. Sabu came in next with a strong momentum against Styles, Kazarian and Roode. Following this, Storm entered the Lethal Lockdown and thereafter, an all-out brawl began ensuing. Raven made his way in and worked over his adversaries. When Morgan, Fortune's final entrant got in, he powerbombed Sabu into the cage and subsequently, Sabu started bleeding. Rhino as the last entrant made his way in and the top of the Lethal Lockdown structure was lowered to begin the match festivities. Everyone grabbed weapons and started going after each other in an all-out war simultaneous to Flair and Foley fighting. Near the end, Morgan kicked the cage door open unintentionally in a misdirected effort. Kazarian and Richards winded up at the top of the cage, where Brian Kendrick appeared out of nowhere, and before Kazarian could jump off a ladder onto Richards, knocked him off and put him through a table with a backdrop. As Kendrick meditated at the top of the cage, back in the ring, Dreamer scored a top rope Dreamer Driver on top of a chair on Styles and claimed the victory by pinfall for EV 2.0.

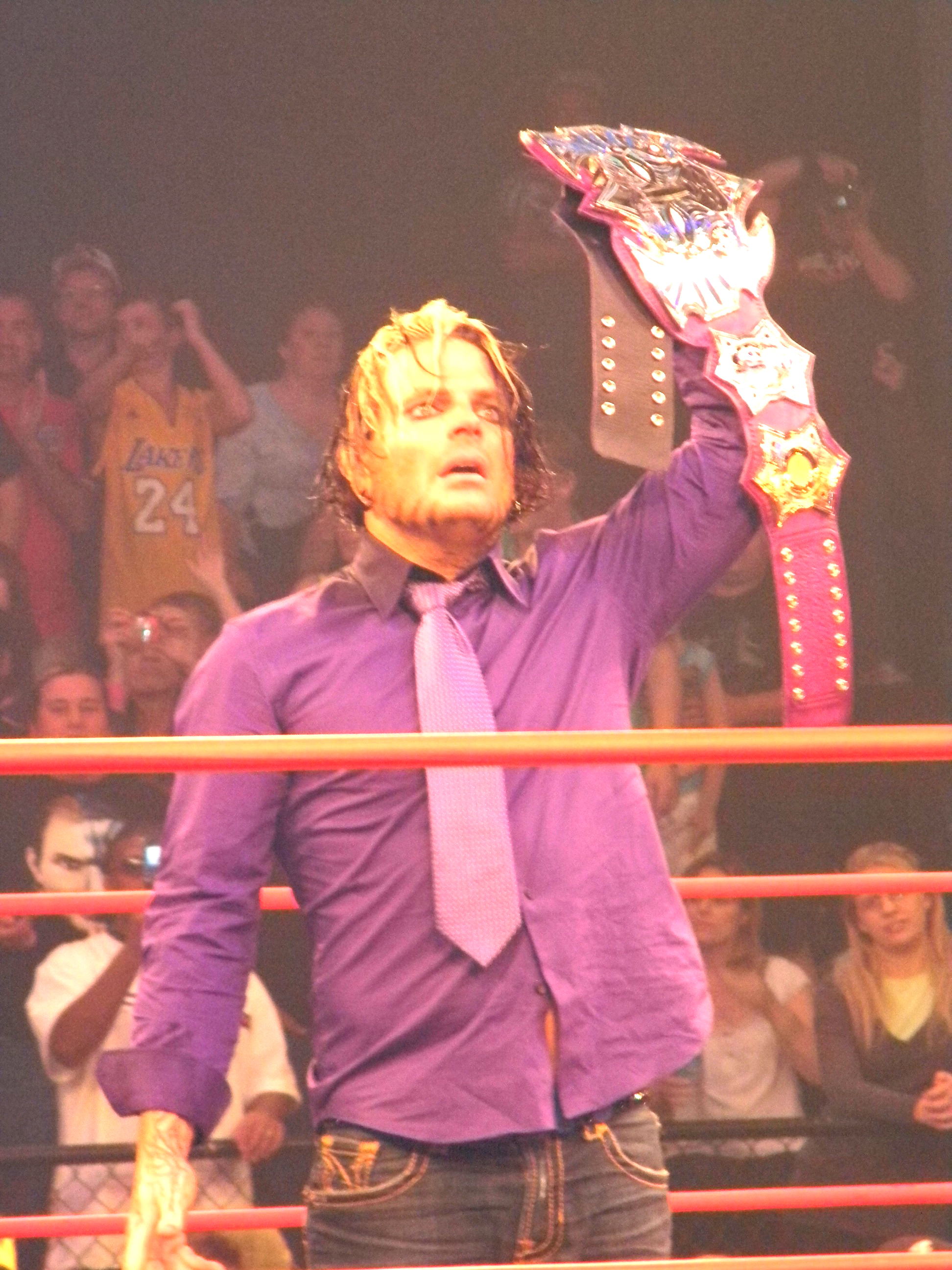
Jeff Hardy, who won the TNA World Heavyweight Championship at Bound for Glory

The main event of the night featured Jeff Hardy versus Kurt Angle, who vowed to retire if he lost, versus Mr. Anderson for the vacant TNA World Heavyweight Championship. Angle and Hardy pursued Anderson to beat him down in the outset of the match but Anderson fought back against the two of them. The short-lived team between Hardy and Angle dissolved after Angle attempted a pin on Anderson right off a Belly to belly Suplex. During Hardy's onslaught on Angle in the ring corner, Anderson struck Hardy and soon, this all led to Angle executing a German Suplex on Hardy, who also performed one on Anderson simultaneously. The action took to the outside and showcased a spot that had Hardy diving out the ring at Angle and Anderson, who were brawling, with a suicide dive. Back in the ring, the offense swung between all three, who tried to capitalize for the win. As the match progressed, in a series of failed attempts, Angle looked to hit the Angle Slam on Anderson as Anderson tried to hit the Mic Check on Angle. When Angle went for a clothesline on the Anderson, he inadvertently missed and connected with the referee. At this time, Angle and Anderson exchanged offense where Angle delivered a German Suplex and Anderson was able to get in a Mic Check which left both men grounded. Near the end of the match, Eric Bischoff came to the ring with a chair and attempted to interfere in the match, but was stopped by the surprise appearance of Hulk Hogan, who made his entrance with crutches due to a back injury. Bischoff grabbed a crutch and appeared to have a disagreement with Hogan, while Hardy grabbed Hogan's other crutch to ward off the two. This all turned out to be a ruse in the end when Hardy attacked Angle with the crutch. Amused, Bischoff offered up his crutch to Hardy, repeating the act on Anderson and following up with the Twist of Fate and the cover to become the new TNA World Heavyweight Champion. After the match, it was revealed that Abyss, Hogan, Bischoff, Jarrett and Hardy were "They". This revealed that Sting and Nash's suspicions against Hogan and Bischoff were right the whole time.

== Aftermath ==
On the following episode of Impact!, Dixie Carter's attorney, Guy Blake, accosted Eric Bischoff and accused him for getting Carter to sign a different contract other than the one to carry out the firing of Abyss, alleging that Bischoff switched contracts and had her sign it under false pretenses. Bischoff declared that Carter openly signed the papers live on television and welcomed any legal action as Blake made his intentions clear that he would further the case.

Hulk Hogan and Bischoff firmly stated that they were the new owners of TNA and together with their new group, "they" were Immortal. Fortune joined their regime after Ric Flair and Hogan exposed that they had gotten over their past differences. At that time, new TNA World Heavyweight Champion Jeff Hardy admitted to being responsible for Abyss critically attacking Rob Van Dam in order to remove him from the TNA World Heavyweight Championship picture, and although Kevin Nash and Sting were invited to align with Immortal, they refused and chose to leave TNA. Carter was also ejected from the building while trying to find out why Hogan and Bischoff conned her into taking over the company.

Soon enough, Carter eventually slapped Hogan with a court order. On the March 3, 2011 edition of Impact!, when the case settled, Hogan made his return and publicly announced that the judge ruled in his favor, and he would take full control of TNA as the owner, while Carter would only "provide the money". On this same episode, Sting returned and from then on, did everything in his power to turn Hogan back to the good side, ending with their match at Bound for Glory 2011, that saw Sting defeat Hogan (before Hogan changed for the better), with the stipulations that Carter would get back control of TNA if Sting won.

Fortune and EV 2.0 continued their feud into Turning Point, where Fortune picked up the victory in their final group versus group war, which allowed Fortune to "fire" a member of EV 2.0 that manifested itself as Sabu. EV 2.0 gradually crumbled before Fortune divided from Immortal in January 2011 to start their next rivalry.

Kurt Angle prepared to retire by giving his farewell address following his loss at Bound for Glory, but found himself in a dilemma over the situation, when he discovered a loophole that he wasn't pinned or submitted in the match. Interrupted, Jeff Jarrett re-lit his feud with Angle, blaming him for making his life a living hell after recruiting him to TNA and was seeking to return the favor. Around the same time, Samoa Joe sought retribution against Jarrett for placing his trust in him and getting betrayed, which converted into matches at the next two PPVs.

In addition, TNA World Tag Team Champions Motor City Machine Guns went on to finish up their feud in a successful effort with Generation Me at Final Resolution 2010 in a Full Metal Mayhem match for the titles.

=== Reception ===
Bound for Glory was received with mixed reviews. Canadian Online Explorer pro wrestling section writer Matt Bishop graded the event a 7 out of 10, the same as last year's event. He stated, “TNA's biggest show of the year, Bound For Glory, was a mix of good and bad. The show's biggest matches delivered on a show that featured a weak undercard”. He also gave the main event 8 out of 10, and the Lethal Lockdown match 7 out of 10. His lowest scores were for the Knockouts Title match that was given a 2 out of 10 and the Young-Jordan versus Neal-Moore match that was rated a dud.

== Results ==
No.	Results	Stipulations	Times
1	The Motor City Machine Guns (Alex Shelley and Chris Sabin) (c) defeated Generation Me (Jeremy Buck and Max Buck)	Tag team match for the TNA World Tag Team Championship	12:54
2	Tara defeated Angelina Love (c), Madison Rayne and Velvet Sky	Four-Way match for the TNA Women's Knockout Championship with Mickie James as special guest referee	05:58
3	Ink Inc. (Jesse Neal and Shannon Moore) defeated Eric Young and Orlando Jordan	Tag team match	06:38
4	Jay Lethal (c) defeated Douglas Williams	Singles match for the TNA X Division Championship	08:16
5	Rob Van Dam defeated Abyss	Monster's Ball match	12:58
6	The Band (D'Angelo Dinero, Kevin Nash and Sting) defeated Jeff Jarrett and Samoa Joe	Three-on-two handicap match	07:45
7	EV 2.0 (Raven, Rhino, Sabu, Stevie Richards and Tommy Dreamer) (with Mick Foley) defeated Fortune (A.J. Styles, James Storm, Kazarian, Matt Morgan and Robert Roode) (with Ric Flair)	Lethal Lockdown match	23:38
8	Jeff Hardy defeated Kurt Angle and Mr. Anderson	Three-Way Dance for the vacant TNA World Heavyweight Championship	18:37
(c) / – the champion(s) heading into the match

=== TNA World Heavyweight Championship Tournament ===
1st Round; Impact! August 10, 2010 (Aired August 19)
Jeff Hardy	Pinfall
Rob Terry	3:23
Kurt Angle	Submission
Douglas Williams	4:57
Jay Lethal	4:11
Mr. Anderson	Pinfall
D'Angelo Dinero	Pinfall
Matt Morgan	4:34

Semifinals; No Surrender; September 5, 2010
Jeff Hardy	No contest (30:00)
Kurt Angle	No contest (30:00) (Note: Angle and Hardy wrestled to another draw on the September 16 episode of Impact!; executive producer Eric Bischoff made the tournament final at Bound for Glory into a three-way match.)
Mr. Anderson	Pinfall
D'Angelo Dinero	16:58

Final; Bound for Glory; October 10, 2010
Jeff Hardy	Pinfall
Kurt Angle Mr. Anderson	— 18:37
