= ROH The Big Bang! =

American wrestling event

The Big Bang!
- Promotional poster
- Promotion: Ring of Honor
- Date: April 3, 2010
- City: Charlotte, North Carolina
- Venue: Grady Cole Center
- Attendance: 800

Pay-per-view chronology
← Previous; Final Battle	Next → Death Before Dishonor VIII

The Big Bang! was a professional wrestling pay-per-view (PPV) event produced by Ring of Honor (ROH), which was only available online. It took place on April 3, 2010 from the Grady Cole Center in Charlotte, North Carolina. Eight matches were featured on the card.

== Production ==
=== Background ===
On November 23, 2009, ROH announced that they had signed a pay-per-view deal with Go Fight Live (GFL) to air live events over the Internet. The first event to be aired as part of this deal was Final Battle 2009.

The Big Bang! was the first ROH show to be held in Charlotte, and it took place in the Grady Cole Center. The event featured several Lucha libre wrestlers as well as ROH competitors, including Blue Demon Jr. and Magno. Prior to the show, an autograph session was held, featuring Jim Cornette, Bobby Eaton, and Tommy Young.

=== Storylines ===
Other on-screen personnel
Commentators	Dave Prazak
Commentators	Kevin Kelly
Commentators	Jim Cornette

The Big Bang! featured professional wrestling matches that involved different wrestlers from pre-existing scripted feuds and storylines. Wrestlers were portrayed as either villains or heroes in the scripted events that built tension and culminated in a wrestling match.

On January 18, 2010, Jim Cornette announced on an episode of Ring of Honor Wrestling that ROH would make its debut in Charlotte, North Carolina with an Internet-only pay-per-view called "The Big Bang!", which sported the slogan, "pro wrestling explodes into the 21st century".

The main feud heading into The Big Bang! was between Tyler Black, Austin Aries, and Roderick Strong over Black's ROH World Championship. At ROH's first online-pay-per-view, Final Battle 2009 in December 2009, then-champion Aries had successfully defended the championship against Black in an hour-long time-limit draw. As a result of Aries trying to run away and take a countout loss, where he would have retained the championship, executive producer Jim Cornette announced that Aries and Black would have a rematch at ROH's 8th Anniversary Show in New York City on February 13. In case of a draw in the rematch, Cornette decreed that three judges would select the winner of the match, and that both Black and Aries would choose a judge. Black elected Roderick Strong, and Aries chose his ally, Kenny King. Cornette then announced himself as the third judge. Strong agreed to be a judge, on the condition that he receive a match for the championship if Black won. During the match at the 8th Anniversary Show, Black superkicked both Cornette and Strong en route to defeating Aries to win his first ROH World Championship. In early March, Cornette announced that as a result of Strong being promised a championship match and Aries invoking his rematch clause, a three-way elimination match would occur at The Big Bang!.

At Final Battle 2009, the regular tag team of Kevin Steen and El Generico disbanded following a loss to The Young Bucks, when Kevin Steen turned on El Generico and hit him with a steel chair. Colt Cabana came out to the ring to stop Steen, who then left ringside. Following this, Cabana attempted to reason with Steen, who had allied himself with Steve Corino. During this time, Generico refused to hurt Steen, despite Cabana encouraging him to exact revenge.

At Final Battle 2009, Claudio Castagnoli and Chris Hero, collectively known as The Kings of Wrestling, reunited and attacked the Briscoe Brothers moments after the Briscoes had won the ROH World Tag Team Championship. Following this, both members of the Kings of Wrestling went on a tour of Japan with Pro Wrestling Noah in January, with it being worked into the storyline between the two teams. The Kings of Wrestling later teamed with The American Wolves (Eddie Edwards and Davey Richards) to defeat the Briscoes and The Young Bucks in an eight-man tag team match in Los Angeles. It was later announced the Kings of Wrestling would receive a World Tag Team Championship match against the Briscoes at The Big Bang!.

== Event ==
=== Preliminary matches ===
Prior to the live broadcast, a dark match was shown the audience, in which Grizzly Redwood and The Bravado Brothers (Harlem and Lance) defeated Ernie Osiris, Zack Sabre Jr., and KC McKnight.

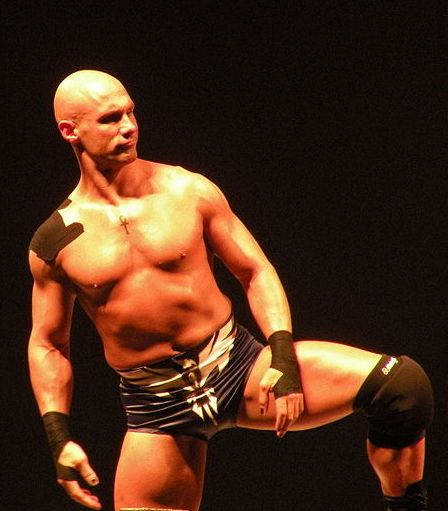
Christopher Daniels, who returned to Ring of Honor at The Big Bang! to challenge Davey Richards

The first match that aired was between Phill Shatter and Zack Salvation. Salvation controlled the first part of the match, but Shatter was able to counter several submission attempts, and eventually won the match with a slam.

The second match was a Pick 6 Series match between Kenny King, ranked number five, and Davey Richards. King was accompanied by his occasional tag team partner, Rhett Titus, who interfered at several points during the match. Richards won the back and forth encounter by submission, by forcing King to tap out to the cloverleaf. After the match, Richards declared his intention to win the ROH World Championship and called himself the best in the world. Christopher Daniels made his return to ROH for the first time in several years to challenge Richards' statement, and told him that if he wanted to call himself the best in the world, he had to go through Daniels first.

The third match was a Butcher's Rules match between the Necro Butcher and Erick Stevens, who was accompanied by his manager Prince Nana and Mr. Ernesto Osiris. Necro won with a roll-up. The fourth match was Rhett Titus versus Cassandro el Exotico in a singles match. Cassandro won the match via a roll-up, despite having appeared to have suffered a leg injury after a suicide dive to the outside.

The next match was a tag team match between El Generico and Colt Cabana and the team of Kevin Steen and Steve Corino. The match ended in disqualification when Steen hit Cabana with a steel chair. After the match, Steen kept attacking Cabana, making him bleed, until Generico made the save. Generico went on to attack Corino and Steen. When other wrestlers attempted to restrain Generico, he attacked them, and ended by performing a super brainbuster on Grizzly Redwood. Cabana then challenged Steen and Corino to a Chicago Street Fight on April 24.

During intermission, Kevin Kelly hosted an interview with Ring of Honor Wrestling executive producer Jim Cornette, Bobby Eaton, and former National Wrestling Alliance referee Tommy Young. Cornette announced that Young would be a special outside referee for the ROH World Championship match that evening, and also confirmed that Daniels would be in attendance at ROH shows on May 7 and 8.

=== Main event matches ===
The match immediately following the intermission was for the ROH World Tag Team Championship, between the defending champions The Briscoe Brothers (Jay Briscoe and Mark Briscoe) and the Kings of Wrestling (Chris Hero and Claudio Castagnoli). The Kings of Wrestling defeated the Briscoes to win the championship for the second time.

The second-last match of the night was the triple threat elimination match for the ROH World Championship, between the defending champion Tyler Black and the challengers Roderick Strong and Austin Aries. Strong was the first eliminated after Aries performed two brainbusters and pinned him for the elimination approximately 26 minutes and 42 seconds. Less than five minutes later, after a total of 31 minutes and 32 seconds, Black pinned Aries to win the match and retain the championship after a series of superkicks. After the pin, Kenny King (who had come down to ringside in an attempt to aid Aries) and Aries attacked Black, until Strong made the save. Strong then refused to shake Black's hand before walking backstage.

The main event was a tag team match which pitted the team of Blue Demon Jr. and Magno against Super Parka and Misterioso. Magno and Blue Demon Jr. won the match when Magno pinned Misterioso.

== Aftermath ==
On April 28, 2010 ROH announced that they would be returning to Charlotte, for a show at the Metrolina Tradeshow Expo on August 28, 2010.

During his match with Rhett Titus, it appeared that wrestler Cassandro el Exotico had suffered a leg injury. Later on in the evening, commentator Dave Prazak announced that Cassandro had suffered a broken leg.

Following their ROH World Tag Team Championship victory, Claudio Castagnoli and Chris Hero (collectively known as The Kings of Wrestling), continued to feud with the Briscoes. The Briscoes invoked their rematch clause for the next pay-per-view, Death Before Dishonor VIII. In the weeks prior to Death Before Dishonor VIII, Hero attacked the Briscoes' father, knocking him out with a rolling elbow. As a result, Cornette announced the match between the two teams would be a No Disqualification match.

Christopher Daniels returned to ROH for the first time in almost three years at The Big Bang!, making his first appearance since April 28, 2007 to challenge Davey Richards. Daniels had his first matches back for ROH the following month, on May 7 and 8, when he faced Kevin Steen, and Davey Richards' long-time tag team partner, Eddie Edwards.

On May 6, ROH announced that they were considering the next challenger for Tyler Black's ROH World Championship. It was later announced that Davey Richards had received a title match, and would be facing Black at Death Before Dishonor VIII. Following his failed attempt to regain the World Championship at The Big Bang!, Austin Aries announced his intention to become "the greatest manager that ever lived", and dedicated himself to helping his proteges The All Night Express (Kenny King and Rhett Titus) win the World Tag Team Championship. Roderick Strong obtained a new manager in Truth Martini, and was announced as a participant in the "Toronto Gauntlet" at Death Before Dishonor VIII.

== Results ==
No.	Results	Stipulations	Times
1^{D}	The Bravado Brothers (Harlem Bravado and Lance Bravado) and Grizzly Redwood defeated KC McKnight, Mr. Ernesto Osiris and Zack Sabre Jr.	Six-man tag team match	—
2	Phill Shatter defeated Zack Salvation	Singles match	07:25
3	Davey Richards defeated Kenny King (with Rhett Titus) (5)	Singles match in the Pick 6 series	16:56
4	Necro Butcher defeated Erick Stevens (with Mr. Ernesto Osiris and Prince Nana)	Butcher's Rules match	08:41
5	Cassandro el Exotico defeated Rhett Titus	Singles match	09:03
6	Colt Cabana and El Generico defeated Kevin Steen and Steve Corino by disqualification	Tag team match	09:57
7	The Kings of Wrestling (Chris Hero and Claudio Castagnoli) (with Shane Hagadorn) defeated The Briscoe Brothers (Jay Briscoe and Mark Briscoe) (c)	Tag team match for the ROH World Tag Team Championship	30:19
8	Tyler Black (c) defeated Austin Aries and Roderick Strong: Aries pinned Strong (26:42).; Black pinned Aries (31:37).	Three-way elimination match for the ROH World Championship	31:37
9	Blue Demon Jr. and Magno defeated Misterioso and Super Parka	Tag team match	15:36
(c) / – the champion(s) heading into the match; D / – this was a dark match

== See also ==
- 2010 in professional wrestling
- List of Ring of Honor pay-per-view events
