= Earl Hebner =

American professional wrestling referee (born 1949)

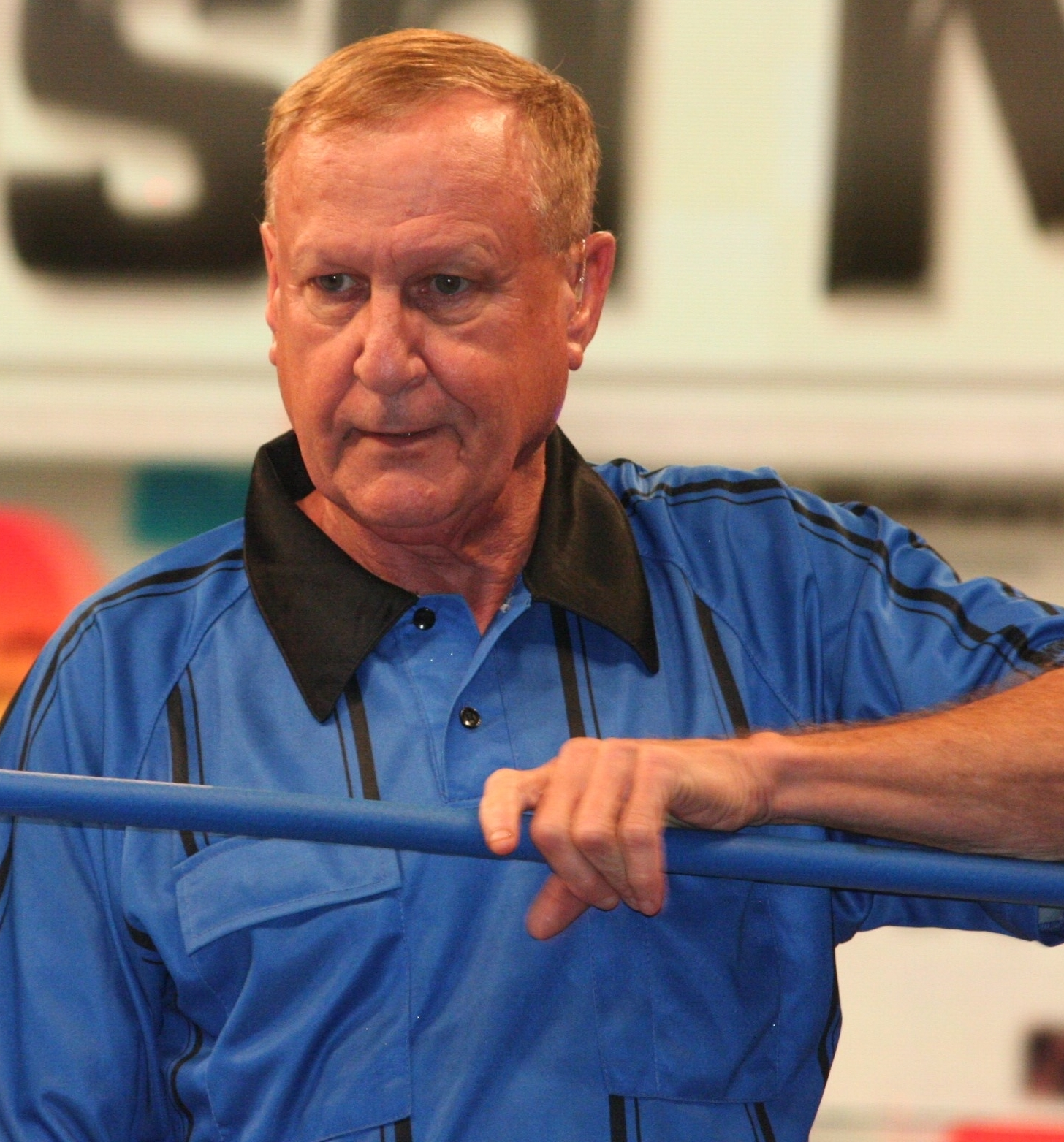
- Hebner in 2017

Personal information
- Born: Earl William Hebner; May 17, 1949 (age 77) Richmond, Virginia, U.S.
- Spouses: Carol Ann Kettner (m. 1969; div. 1977) Susan Ann Green (m. 1978; div. 2000)
- Children: 2 including Brian Hebner (wrestling referee)
- Relative: Dave Hebner (twin brother)

Professional wrestling career
- Ring name: Earl Hebner
- Billed height: 5 ft 7 in (1.70 m)
- Billed weight: 161 lb (73 kg)
- Trained by: Tommy Young
- Debut: 1977
- Retired: 2021

Earl William Hebner (born May 17, 1949) is an American retired professional wrestling referee. He is best known for his time as senior referee for the World Wrestling Federation (now WWE) from 1988 to 2005. Hebner was also the senior referee for Total Nonstop Action Wrestling (TNA) from 2005 to 2017, and was inducted into the TNA Hall of Fame in 2015. In 2019, Hebner joined All Elite Wrestling, where he was used primarily for main event and title matches.

Hebner (along with his identical twin brother, Dave) played a prominent role in the inaugural The Main Event card in 1988, in which André the Giant controversially defeated Hulk Hogan for the WWF World Heavyweight Championship, as well as the infamous "Montreal Screwjob" during the main event of the 1997 Survivor Series. He also participated in a number of storylines, including feuds involving The McMahon–Helmsley Faction and The Alliance.

== Professional wrestling career ==
=== Early career (1977–1988) ===
Hebner officiated matches for Jim Crockett Promotions during much of the 1980s. He was the referee during the famous "I Quit" match at Starrcade 1985 between Tully Blanchard and Magnum T. A. He can be seen at ringside during the first ever WarGames match at the 1987 Great American Bash as well as the final match of the Bunkhouse Stampede tournament in January 1988.

=== World Wrestling Federation/Entertainment (1988–2005) ===
==== Debut and championship controversy (1988–1997) ====
Just days after that match, Hebner debuted in the World Wrestling Federation as a referee during a WWF World Heavyweight Championship match pitting champion Hulk Hogan against challenger André the Giant, which aired live on February 5, 1988, on NBC's The Main Event. In the storyline, Hebner's identical twin brother Dave Hebner was the assigned official, but unbeknownst to Hogan, André's manager Ted DiBiase had bribed the then-unknown Earl Hebner to steal the victory and the championship. Earl then counted André's pin against Hogan, even though Hogan's shoulders were clearly off the mat. As André and DiBiase were celebrating (with André quickly "selling" his title to an overjoyed DiBiase), Dave (whom DiBiase had locked in a closet prior to the match) ran to the ring and confronted Earl. The two brothers argued, and then they fought each other in the middle of the ring. Hulk Hogan, figuring out that Dave's "evil twin" had jobbed him out, picked Earl up and gorilla press slammed him over the ropes and onto the aisleway (missing DiBiase). It was part of the storyline for Hogan to lose the title in order for him to take time off to spend time with his newborn daughter Brooke Hogan and to film the movie No Holds Barred.

This match helped set up a 14-man elimination tournament at WrestleMania IV, since WWF President Jack Tunney declared the title "vacant" a week after The Main Event match as the WWF World Heavyweight Championship "cannot be bought or sold," where the winner would win the WWF World Heavyweight Championship. Vince McMahon paid both Hebners a bonus of $2,500 for participating in the angle.

Meanwhile, the WWF continued to build heat for Earl Hebner through a kayfabe "investigative report" published in the promotion's flagship publication, WWF Magazine. The article claimed, through a fictional backstory, that Dave had "been plagued by the misdeeds of his brother Earl" throughout their childhoods, citing such examples as Earl's cheating in school and, while posing as Dave, doing such things as bullying fellow students and abandoning Dave's pretty girlfriend on a sidewalk in a slum district at night. The report continued by noting that, despite Dave's appeal of the controversial ending to the Hogan-Andre match at The Main Event, Tunney had to uphold the decision since Earl was a licensed referee in Indiana (the match took place in Indianapolis); and that, as a result of Earl's cooperation, he became a "very rich" man thanks to a payoff by DiBiase.

However, the "evil twin" referee storyline was quickly dropped when Dave was apparently injured in the aftermath of the Hogan-Andre Main Event match; in a 2001 interview with the WWF RAW Magazine, Dave claimed to have suffered broken ribs as a result of Earl kicking him as part of the angle, forcing Dave out of action until after WrestleMania IV. The storyline was then shifted to have Earl come clean, and he was the referee when "Macho Man" Randy Savage won the Tournament final at WrestleMania IV against "Million Dollar Man" Ted DiBiase for the WWF World Heavyweight Championship.

==== Montreal Screwjob (1997) ====
The most infamous event in Hebner's career—and possibly in the history of professional wrestling in North America—came during the main event of the 1997 Survivor Series in what has since been dubbed the "Montreal Screwjob". During a match for the WWF Championship between then champion Bret Hart and challenger Shawn Michaels, Hebner signaled for the timekeeper to ring the bell (signifying the end of the match) while Michaels had Hart in a Sharpshooter hold—Hart's long-established signature move—even though Hart visibly had not submitted. Michaels had thus "won" the WWF Championship. This was not the match ending that Hart had asked for. Hebner had, at the behest of Vince McMahon, "screwed" Hart out of the title. The reason for the "screwjob" was that Hart, who would be leaving the company one month later to join a rival promotion World Championship Wrestling (WCW), was unwilling to lose the title to Michaels in Canada. Though Hart said that he was willing to vacate the title the next night on WWF Raw, McMahon feared that Hart would leave the company with the title, take the belt to WCW, and disrespect it as Madusa had done in 1995 with the WWF Women's Championship, throwing the belt into a garbage can during a live Nitro show. He therefore decided to remove the title from Hart forcibly, by instructing Hebner (who had previously promised Hart "on his children's lives" that he would not betray him) to signal an end to the bout when Michaels had Hart in a submission hold.

The fallout of the screwjob led to a large degree of antagonism towards Hebner, McMahon, and Michaels, especially in Canada, where fans often chant "You screwed Bret!" at the offending parties. In the same vein, Earl's son Brian Hebner, a former WWE referee on the SmackDown! brand and current Impact Wrestling referee, received chants of "Your dad screwed Bret!" at shows in Canada. However, on Right After Wrestling, hosted by Arda Ocal and Jimmy Korderas, Hebner stated that he has since spoken with Hart and they have buried the hatchet, with regards to the Montreal Screwjob.

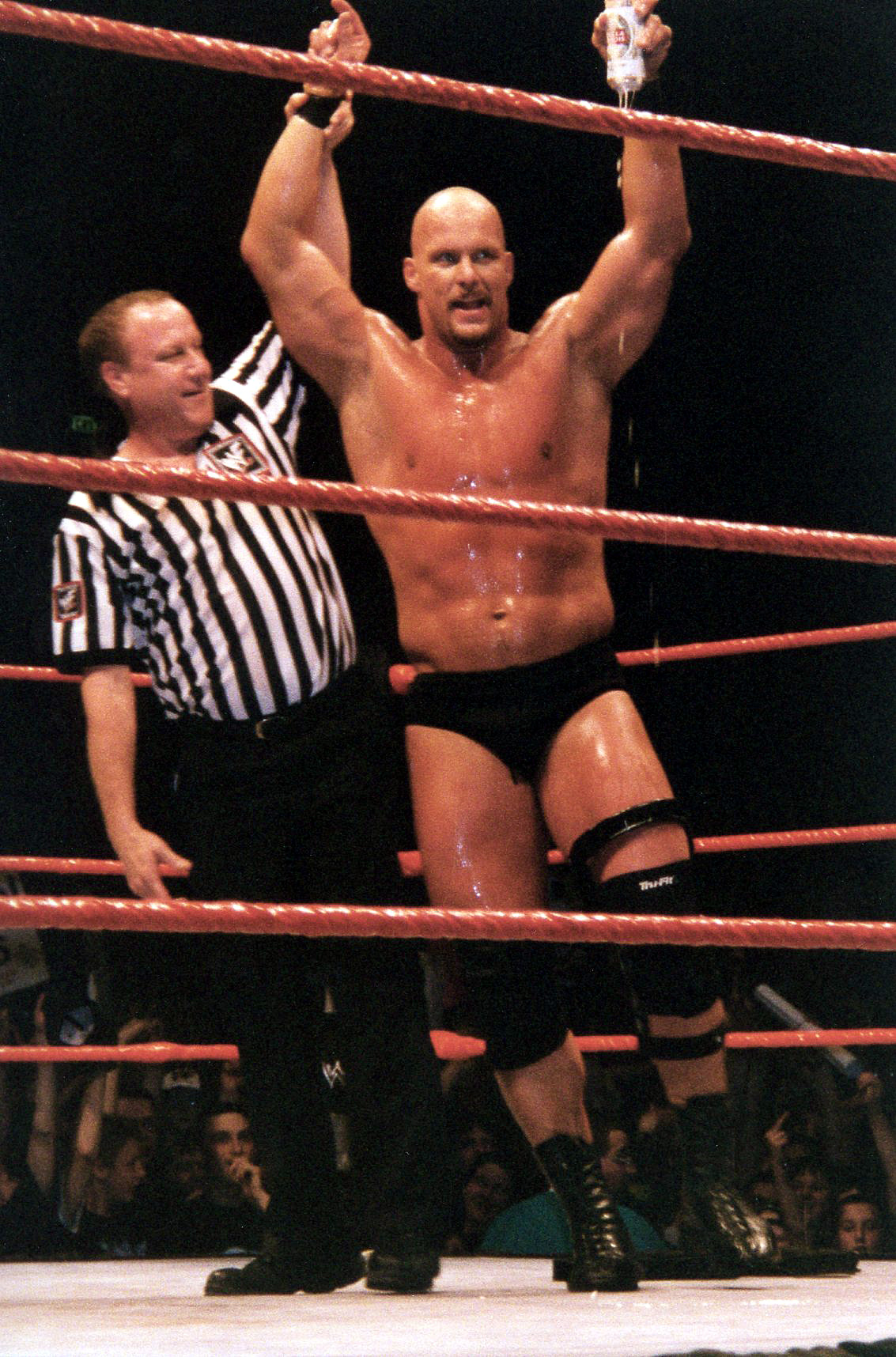
Hebner in the WWF with Stone Cold Steve Austin.

==== Later WWF/WWE career and departure (1999–2005) ====
Hebner was involved in several storylines. He spearheaded the (kayfabe) referee's strike in 1999, resulting in referees being given the authority to defend themselves if physically provoked by wrestlers. In early 2000, he cost Triple H his WWF Championship by quick-counting during a match between Triple H and Chris Jericho following weeks of abuse by Triple H. Triple H eventually forced Hebner to reverse the decision, promising never to lay his hands on Hebner as long as Hebner was a WWF employee. After Hebner took the title from Jericho and gave it back to Triple H, Triple H "fired" Hebner and promptly Pedigreed him and beat him unconscious. Hebner was reinstated by Linda McMahon thirteen days later, replacing corrupt guest referee Shane McMahon during a title match between Triple H and The Rock at Backlash and counting the fall when The Rock covered Triple H for the pin. Hebner was also the first referee to be a playable character in a wrestling video game as he was included in the roster of WWF No Mercy. During the Invasion angle in late 2001, Hebner became involved in a feud involving WCW referee Nick Patrick. Patrick was a biased referee who often helped The Alliance achieve victories over their WWF opponents. Hebner defeated Patrick in a match at WWF Invasion.

On July 18, 2005, WWE announced that Hebner was fired from WWE for selling WWE merchandise without permission. Hebner's identical twin brother Dave was released from WWE as well on July 19 in connection with these events. These activities would have been conducted from a store that Earl Hebner had partial ownership in, the St. Louis based Pro Shirt Shop. To avoid negative publicity, the controlling owner of the Pro Shirt Shop, Nick Ridenour, bought out Hebner's share in the company and released a press statement which claimed that the company only received merchandise from licensed distributors. However, the claim of Hebner's firing for selling bootleg merchandise was then rebuked during a March 2025 interview when WWE's then-head of talent relations John Laurinaitis actually fired him because he wanted to terminate his brother, Dave, who was McMahon's right hand man, from his employment.

=== Total Nonstop Action Wrestling/Impact Wrestling (2006–2017) ===
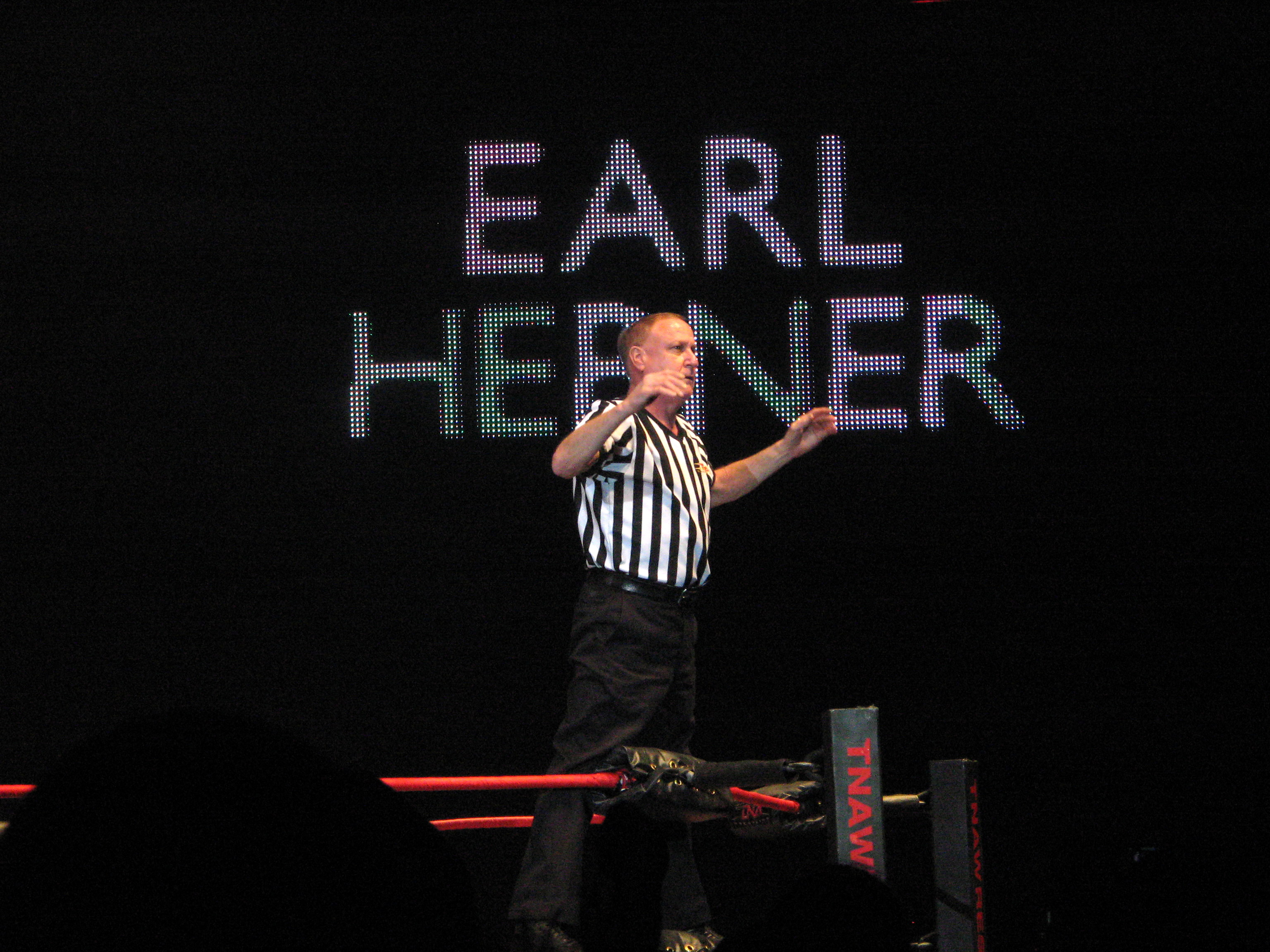
Hebner at a TNA event in January 2010.

Seven months after his departure from WWE, Hebner debuted for Total Nonstop Action Wrestling (TNA) at the Against All Odds pay-per-view on February 12, 2006. He officiated the main event, which saw Canadian born Christian Cage defeat Jeff Jarrett for the NWA World Heavyweight Championship. During the match, commentators Mike Tenay and Don West alluded to the Montréal Screwjob on several occasions, urging Hebner not to call for the bell when Jarrett placed Cage in a sharpshooter. Despite the concerns of the commentators, Hebner was an impartial referee. However, he once again caused controversy based on his actions at the TNA Slammiversary 2006 pay-per-view. During the King of the Mountain match, he assisted Jeff Jarrett in winning the match by pushing a ladder over with Sting and then-champion Christian Cage on it. This led to the new head of management Jim Cornette taking the belt from Jarrett as the show ended, leaving the status of the belt in question as to who would be the champion. On the June 22 episode of TNA Impact!, Cornette vacated the title. On the June 30 episode, he awarded the title to Jarrett, but fired (kayfabe) Hebner. Hebner was then reinstated by Cornette due to Jarrett's polygraph test saying that Hebner was not involved. Hebner was punched in the face by Jeff Jarrett and was (kayfabe) injured. At No Surrender he replaced original referee Slick Johnson for the TNA Knockout Tag Team Championship match because of what happened at Victory Road.

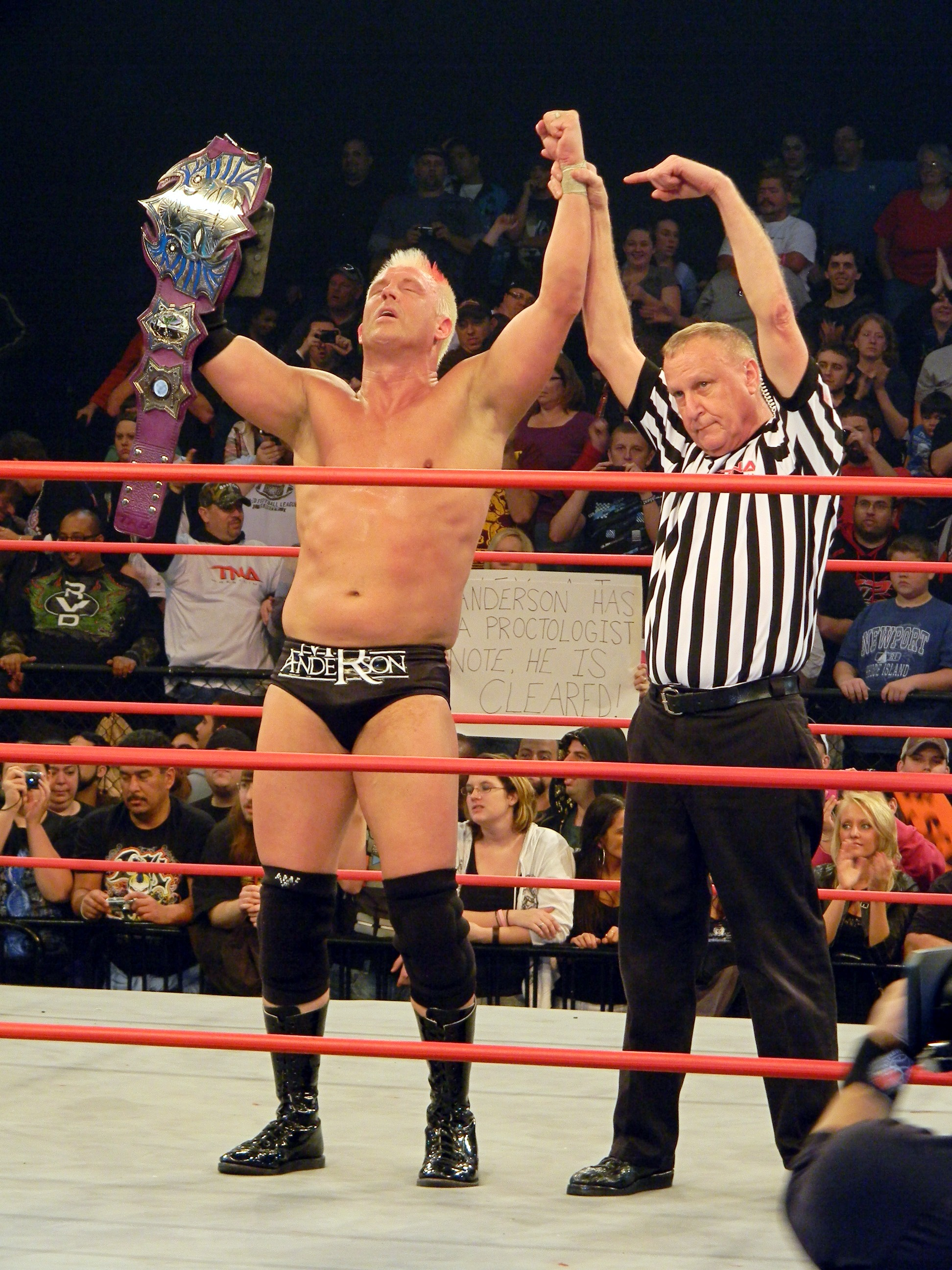
Hebner with Mr. Anderson at TNA Genesis 2011.

TNA Wrestling had their own version of the Montreal Screwjob, in this case, it was a TNA World Heavyweight Championship match on the January 21, 2010, episode of TNA Impact! between Kurt Angle and defending champion A.J. Styles. Previously to this match, Angle and Styles had fought at the TNA pay-per-view Genesis, which was also for the TNA World Heavyweight Championship except the stipulation was that if Angle were to lose, he would never get another shot at the title in 2010. In this match, Ric Flair interfered causing Styles to retain his title. Hulk Hogan, now running TNA with Eric Bischoff somewhat controversially to some fans, said that due to Flair's interference in the match at Genesis, Angle would get another match at the title on Impact! and if Flair were to interfere, Styles would be stripped of the title and the title would be awarded to Angle. During the match, Angle put his signature move, the Ankle Lock on Styles, but Styles reversed it and used the Ankle Lock on Angle which resulted in the "Screwjob" when referee Earl Hebner called for the bell although Angle did not submit, similar to The Montreal Screwjob. On the January 28 episode of Impact! Earl confessed to screwing Bret Hart and Kurt Angle for the money. Hulk Hogan then suspended him indefinitely. On the March 8 Monday night edition of Impact! Hogan decided to give Hebner a second chance and had him referee the main event of the evening, a tag team match, where Hogan and Abyss faced A.J. Styles and Ric Flair.

In May 2012, Hebner signed a contract extension with TNA, which would keep him with the promotion through 2013. In July 2012, Hebner started a romance storyline with Madison Rayne, as part of which, he started helping her win matches, including one for the TNA Women's Knockout Championship on August 12 at Hardcore Justice. In response to this situation, Knockouts Executive Brooke Hogan announced that Hebner would no longer referee the Knockouts matches. On April 17, 2014, Hebner was reinstated as Knockouts referee, when Madison Rayne defeated Velvet Sky in a Street Fight. On June 19, 2014, Hebner was involved in the TNA World Heavyweight Championship bout between Kenny King and Eric Young, but after King's loss, MVP fired Hebner and made him get rid of his uniform, to the disgust of his son, Brian, but was reinstated by the new Executive Chief of Wrestling Operations, Kurt Angle after MVP was relieved of his duties by Board of Directors. On September 14, 2015, it was announced that Hebner would be inducted into the TNA Hall of Fame class of 2015. On November 3, 2017, it was reported both Hebner and his son, Brian, had parted ways with Impact Wrestling.

=== Independent circuit (2018–2019) ===
On July 7, 2018, Hebner refereed what was advertised as his final event at Ring Wars Carolina, which also saw the refereeing debut of his daughter, Katie. On September 1, 2018, Hebner refereed All In, and was part of the match between Nick Aldis and Cody Rhodes for the NWA World Heavyweight Championship. Hebner refereed NWA 70th Anniversary Show in Nashville, Tennessee, and was part of the main event match between Nick Aldis and Cody Rhodes for the NWA World Heavyweight Championship. On February 16, 2019, Hebner refereed at All Star Wrestling's Justice in the main event between Sharp Dressed Man Lawrence and the debuting Brian Snyder in Lewisburg, Tennessee. Near the end of the match, Snyder put Lawrence in the crossface, Lawrence's finishing hold, as Hebner called for the bell, even though Lawrence never gave up. The finish was very similar to the Montreal Screwjob.

=== All Elite Wrestling (2019–2021) ===
In 2019, Hebner, along with a number of other referees, joined All Elite Wrestling. He officiated a limited number of AEW events, primarily AEW pay-per-views and selected episodes of AEW Dynamite. Hebner then went on a one-year officiating hiatus that ended in 2022 when he returned to Impact Wrestling.

=== Return to Total Nonstop Action Wrestling (2022–present) ===
Hebner made his return to IMPACT Wrestling after 5 years away from the company at Slammiversary (2022) to count the 1–2–3 to give the Impact Originals the win against Honor No More. He returned again at Slammiversary (2024) in Montreal as a referee in X-Division champion Mustafa Ali's pocket, in reference to Hebner's role in the Montreal Screwjob, but this time refused to call the match against challenger Mike Bailey while Ali had him locked in the sharpshooter, and ultimately called the match fair when Ali submitted to a sharpshooter from Bailey.

== Personal life ==
Hebner was married twice, he was first married to Carol Ann Kettner from 1969 to 1977. He later married Susan Ann Green, the marriage lasted from 1978 to 2000. Hebner's son Brian Hebner is also a professional wrestling referee (retired in June 2022) before becoming a professional wrestling podcaster with Jim Korderas, while his daughter Katie made a cameo appearance with TNA in 2008 as "Katie Kim", the sister of Gail Kim. Hebner's identical twin brother, Dave, was also a wrestling referee as well as a promoter.

Hebner played himself in the episode "Sixteen Candles and Four-Hundred Pound Men" of Boy Meets World. Stock footage of one of his WWF matches was also featured in the motion picture Encino Man. In July 2016, Hebner was named part of a class action lawsuit filed against WWE which alleged that performers incurred "long term neurological injuries" and that the company "routinely failed to care" for them and "fraudulently misrepresented and concealed" the nature and extent of those injuries. The suit was litigated by attorney Konstantine Kyros, who has been involved in a number of other lawsuits against WWE, primarily over chronic traumatic encephalopathy, an issue that has risen to the forefront of sports-related injuries, especially after the Chris Benoit double-murder and suicide. In September 2018, US District Judge Vanessa Lynne Bryant dismissed the lawsuit.

== Awards and accomplishments ==
- Ground Xero Wrestling
  - GXW Hall of Fame (Class of 2016)
- Total Nonstop Action Wrestling
  - TNA Hall of Fame (2015)

Sporting positions
Preceded by none	WWF/WWE Senior Referee; 1988–2002	Succeeded by Replaced with WWE Raw Senior Referee and WWE SmackDown Senior Referee
Preceded by First	WWE Raw Senior Referee; 2002–2005	Succeeded by Mike Chioda
Preceded by Rudy Charles	Total Nonstop Action Wrestling/Impact Wrestling Senior Referee; 2009–2017	Succeeded by Brian Hebner
