= Tommy Young =

Professional wrestling referee (born 1947)

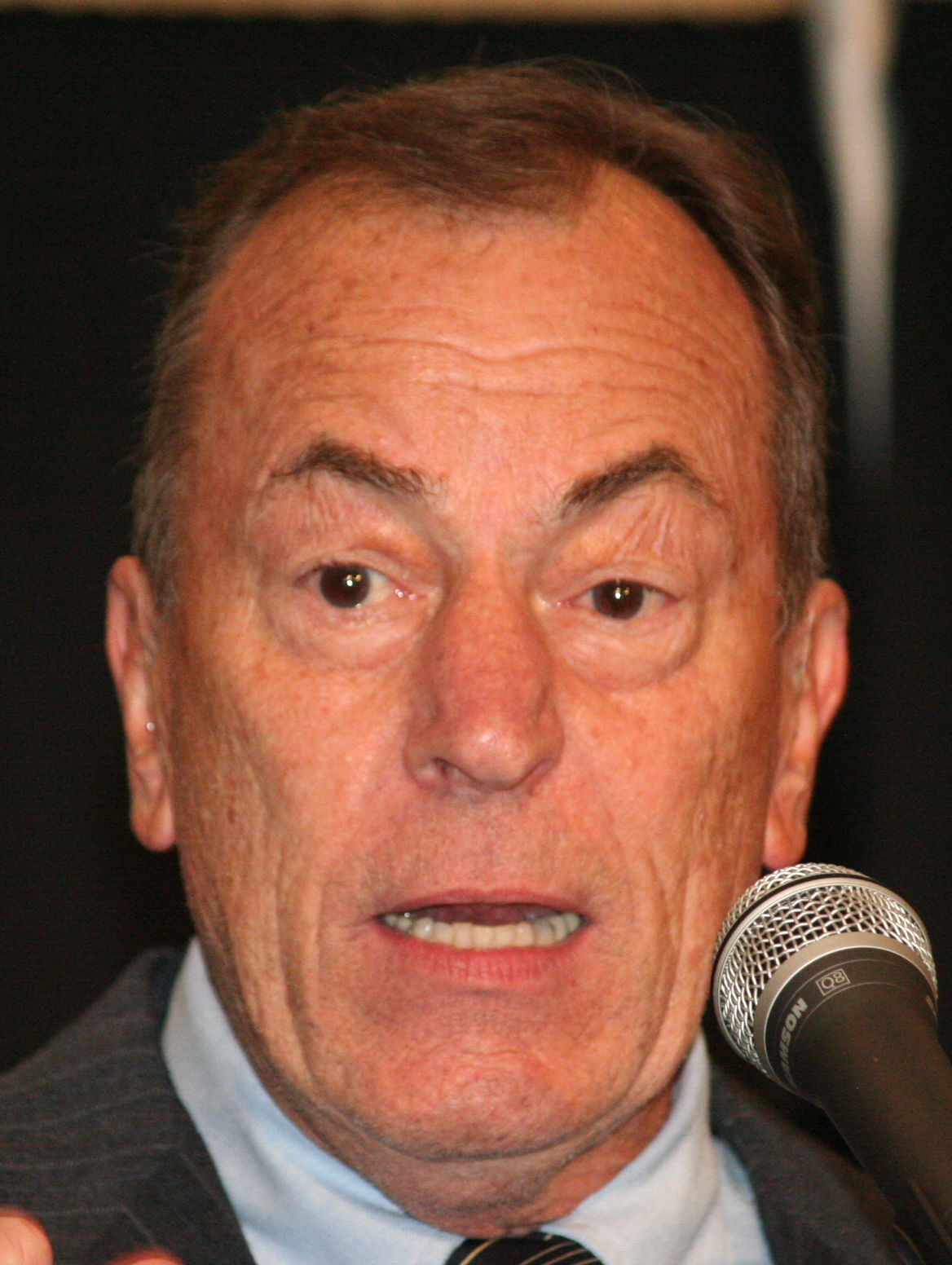
- Young in 2014

Personal information
- Born: Thomas M. Machlay; July 9, 1947 (age 79)
- Spouse: Pam Machlay
- Children: 6

Professional wrestling career
- Ring name: Tommy Young
- Trained by: Lou Klein
- Debut: 1971
- Retired: 1989

Thomas M. Machlay (born July 9, 1947), better known by the ring name Tommy Young, is an American retired professional wrestling referee and professional wrestler. He is best known for his appearances with Jim Crockett Promotions.

== Career ==
Tommy Young started out as a wrestler in 1971 for Ed Farhat in Michigan and later as a referee in Pedro Martínez's National Wrestling Federation which evolved into the International Wrestling Association (IWA). He usually traveled with George "Crybaby" Cannon in a large green Buick 225 between matches. Jim Crockett Promotions was able to lure Tommy away from IWA In 1976, he began working for the National Wrestling Alliance and Jim Crockett Promotions as a referee. By the 1980s, Young was the Senior Referee for Jim Crockett Promotions and refereed most of the NWA World Heavyweight Championship matches. In this role, Young officiated many famous matches throughout professional wrestling history, including several classic bouts between Ric Flair and Ricky Steamboat. He had a unique style of urgently sliding to the mat to officiate the pinfall. He often employed strong facial expressions and creative body language to sell wrestler's moves, express pain if he was attacked, or show frustration over the villains' cheating.

On November 28, 1989, while refereeing a match between Mike Rotunda and Tommy Rich at a World Championship Wrestling TV taping in Atlanta, Georgia, Young suffered a career-ending injury. After an angered Rich threw Young out of his way, Young's head bounced off the rope and he was left legitimately incapacitated for the remainder of the match. The match aired on December 9, 1989. This resulted in a broken neck and the end of his full-time career as a referee. Following the injury, Young drove a parts truck for a Toyota dealership and made home deliveries for prescription drugs.

In 1998, Young appeared briefly in the World Wrestling Federation as part of a NWA invasion angle. He attends wrestling reunion shows and still occasionally referees, including special matches such as the Rock 'n' Roll Express vs. Midnight Express matches. In 2010, at Ring of Honor's Big Bang! pay-per-view, Young served outside the ring as a special guest referee for the ROH World Championship match. He also officiated the George South Battle Royal at WrestleCade IV in 2015.

== Personal life ==
Young has been married to his wife Pam for over forty years. They have six children and two grandchildren. Young has two twin brothers. He has expressed support for the Crockett Foundation which was founded by Jim Crockett Sr. in 1931 to support US military veterans.

== Accomplishments and legacy ==
Young was named Referee of the Year in 1981, 1982, 1983, 1985 and 1986. In 2010, he became the first referee inducted into 411Mania's Wrestling Hall of Fame. Jim Cornette has referred to Young as his all-time favorite referee due to his lively expressiveness in the ring.

- Ohio Professional Wrestling Hall of Fame
  - Ohio Professional Wrestling Hall of Fame (Class of 2023)
