= Buck Quartermain =

American professional wrestler (born 1967)

Personal information
- Born: Jason Seguine; July 24, 1967 (age 59) Tampa, Florida, U.S.

Professional wrestling career
- Ring name(s): Buck Quartermain; Buck Quartermaine; Buck Q
- Billed height: 5 ft 10 in (1.78 m)
- Billed weight: 200 lb (91 kg)
- Trained by: Jimmy Del Ray
- Debut: 1991
- Retired: 2018

Jason Seguine (born July 24, 1967) is an American professional wrestler known by his ring name Buck Quartermain.

He has worked for World Wrestling Federation/Entertainment, Extreme Championship Wrestling, World Championship Wrestling and Total Nonstop Action Wrestling, where he formed a tag team with Lex Lovett.

== Early life ==
Born in Tampa, Florida, Seguine attended Westmore College playing college football, basketball and baseball becoming a three sport letterman before his graduation. He later played as a defensive back for Jacksonville State University.

== Professional wrestling career ==
Seguine trained under Jimmy Del Ray, and thereafter made his professional debut in 1991 as Buck Quartermain. A mainstay on the Florida independent circuit, Seguine competed for Independent Pro Wrestling and NWA Florida during much of his early career.

=== World Wrestling Federation/Entertainment ===
During early 1995, he had a brief stint in the World Wrestling Federation and although having little success against opponents such as Jeff Jarrett and Hunter Hearst Helmsley wrestling on Monday Night Raw he did defeat The Brooklyn Brawler in a dark match at the 1995 Royal Rumble in his hometown of Tampa on January 22, 1995.

He also made a one-time appearance on Monday Night Raw as Buck Quartermaine teaming with Steve Madison to lose to The Big Show in a handicap match in Tampa on August 29, 2005.

On September 1, 2005, he would also appear on SmackDown in a tag team match with Antonio Banks in a losing effort against The Shane Twins in a dark match.

=== Total Nonstop Action Wrestling ===
Quartermain made his TNA debut losing to Christopher Daniels on January 21, 2005. After competing In singles action for a while, Quartermain formed a tag team with Lex Lovett.

On February 13, 2005, at Against All Odds, Quartermain and Lovett lost to Phi Delta Slam on the pre-show.

On March 13, 2005, after losing to Andy Douglas and Chris Candido at Destination X 2005 in a dark match during the Pay per view broadcast Jonny Fairplay offered to become their manager and sign them to TNA contracts. They later ended their tag team in May 2005.

On December 11, 2005, at TNA Turning Point 2005, he lost a six-man tag team match to Lance Hoyt and The Naturals along with Joe Doering and Jon Bolen.

Appearing in TNA in a part-time capacity, Quartermain and Lovett appeared on TNA iMPACT! during early 2006 losing to Team 3D on January 7 and while teaming with Kenny King they lost to The James Gang on January 21, 2006.

On March 4, 2006, Quartermain made his final appearance in an eight-man tag team match teaming Cassidy Riley, Shark Boy and Norman Smiley losing to Abyss, Jeff Jarrett and America's Most Wanted.

== Championships and accomplishments ==
- Caribbean Championship Wrestling
  - CCW Heavyweight Championship (1 time)
- Coastal Championship Wrestling
  - CCW Heavyweight Championship (2 times)
- Elite Wrestling Entertainment
  - Florida's Strongest Tournament (2005)
- Florida State Professional Wrestling Association
  - FSPWA Heavyweight Championship (1 time)
- Future of Wrestling
  - FOW Heavyweight Championship (1 time)
- Florida Wrestling Alliance
  - FWA Light Heavyweight Championship (1 time)
  - FWA Tag Team Championship (1 time)
- Florida Wrestling Federation
  - FWF Light Heavyweight Championship (1 time)
- Independent Professional Wrestling
  - IPW Heavyweight Championship (1 time)
  - IPW Tag Team Championship (1 time) – with Freedom Ryder
- NWA Championship Wrestling from Florida
  - NWA Florida Heavyweight Championship (1 time)
  - NWA Florida World Tag Team Championship (1 time) – with Mike Sullivan
  - NWA Florida Junior Heavyweight Championship (1 time)
- Universal Championship Wrestling Association
  - UCWA Junior Heavyweight Championship (1 time)
- Other titles
  - WWC Heavyweight Championship (2 times)
