= TNA Against All Odds (2005) =

2005 Total Nonstop Action Wrestling pay-per-view event

Against All Odds (2005)
- Promotional poster featuring Scott Hall, Jeff Jarrett, Kevin Nash
- Promotion: Total Nonstop Action Wrestling
- Date: February 13, 2005
- City: Orlando, Florida
- Venue: TNA Impact! Zone
- Attendance: 775

Pay-per-view chronology
← Previous; Final Resolution	Next → Destination X

Against All Odds chronology
← Previous; First	Next → 2006

The 2005 Against All Odds was a professional wrestling pay-per-view (PPV) event produced by Total Nonstop Action Wrestling (TNA), which took place on February 13, 2005, at the TNA Impact! Zone in Orlando, Florida. It was the first event under the Against All Odds chronology. Eight matches were featured on the event's card.

The main event was for the NWA World Heavyweight Championship between the champion, Jeff Jarrett, and the challenger, Kevin Nash, in which Jarrett won to retain the championship. Another featured match was an Iron Man match for the TNA X Division Championship, in which the wrestler with the most scoring conditions after thirty minutes would win. The champion, A.J. Styles, defeated the challenger, Christopher Daniels, to retain the championship in this match. Multiple bouts were scheduled on the undercard. One saw Abyss defeat Jeff Hardy in a match where the competitors had to climb a ladder and retrieve an envelope to become number one contender to the NWA World Heavyweight Championship, in what is called a Full Metal Mayhem match. The other being for the NWA World Tag Team Championship between the champions, America's Most Wanted (Chris Harris and James Storm) (AMW), and Kid Kash and Lance Hoyt; AMW claimed victory in the match.

The event marked the debut of the Full Metal Mayhem match, which later became one of TNA's most successful match types. The professional wrestling section of the Canadian Online Explorer website rated the entire event a 7 out of 10 stars, which was the same rating as the 2006 event.

== Production ==
=== Background ===
The event featured eight professional wrestling matches that involved different wrestlers from pre-existing scripted feuds, plots, and storylines. Wrestlers were portrayed as either villains or heroes in the scripted events that built tension and culminated in a wrestling match or series of matches.

The main event at Against All Odds was a standard wrestling match for the NWA World Heavyweight Championship, in which Jeff Jarrett defended the championship against his on-screen rival Kevin Nash. The bout was announced on the January 21 episode of TNA's primary television program, TNA Impact!, during a pre-taped press conference. On the February 11 episode of Impact!, authority figure Dusty Rhodes added the stipulation that if Jarrett used a guitar (a weapon he often used to win his matches) during the match, he would be automatically disqualified and would lose the NWA World Heavyweight Championship to Nash even if the referee did not see him use it.

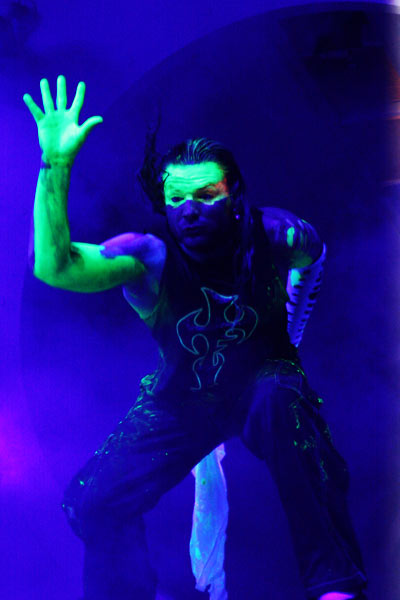
Jeff Hardy fought Abyss in a Full Metal Mayhem match at Against All Odds.

Another storyline rivalry heading into Against All Odds was for the TNA X Division Championship between the champion, A.J. Styles, and the challenger, Christopher Daniels, in a thirty-minute Iron Man match. An Iron Man match involves two competitors fighting for a predetermined amount of time, in this case thirty-minutes, after which whoever gained more pinfalls or submissions is the victor. The rivalry for this match began on the January 21 episode of Impact!, when Daniels challenged Styles to a match that night, in which if Styles could not defeat him in under ten-minutes then Daniels got a X Division Championship match at Against All Odds. The match ended in a time limit draw, which meant per the pre-match stipulation Daniels gained a championship match at Against All Odds. Dusty Rhodes then entered the arena after the match and announced that the contest would be a thirty-minute Iron Man match.

A featured match heading into Against All Odds was the debuting of Full Metal Mayhem, in which Abyss fought Jeff Hardy, with the winner becoming number one contender to the NWA World Heavyweight Championship. In a Full Metal Mayhem match, two or more competitors fight to either gain a pinfall, submission, or climb a ladder to retrieve an envelope or a championship belt in no disqualification rules. In this particular one there were two envelopes, one with a contract for the championship match, while the other one was empty. At TNA's previous PPV, Final Resolution, Abyss attacked Hardy after his match with Scott Hall. On the January 21 episode of Impact!, Abyss attacked Hardy once again and this time by slamming him through a table. On the January 28 episode of Impact!, TNA advertised the debut of Full Metal Mayhem between Hardy and Abyss at Against All Odds. On the February 4 episode of Impact!, the second stipulation of the match was announced, that the winner would gain a future championship match on a future edition of Impact!.

In the tag team division, the reigning NWA World Tag Team Champions America's Most Wanted (Chris Harris and James Storm) defended the championship against the team of Kid Kash and Lance Hoyt. This match was the result of a challenge issued by Kash and Hoyt on the January 21 episode of Impact! to AMW to defend the championship against them at Against All Odds, which AMW accepted.

== Event ==
Other on-screen personnel
Commentator	Mike Tenay
Commentator	Don West
Ring announcer	Jeremy Borash
Referee	Rudy Charles
Referee	Mark "Slick" Johnson
Referee	Andrew Thomas
Interviewers	Jeremy Borash
Interviewers	Shane Douglas

=== Pre-Show ===
The thirty-minute pre-show aired before the event began with a match between Phi Delta Slam (Bruno Sassi and Big Tilly) and the team of Lex Lovett and Buck Quatermain. Phi Delta Slam won the match by pinfall, after Big Tilly performed a splash from the top rope onto Lovett. The second saw real-life brothers Ron and Don Harris defeat the team of Mikey Batts and Jerelle Clark.

=== Preliminary matches ===
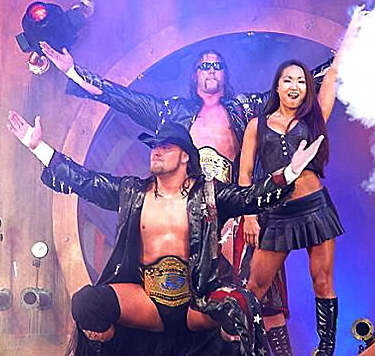
America's Most Wanted (Chris Harris and James Storm) defended the NWA World Tag Team Championship against Kid Kash and Lance Hoyt at Against All Odds.

Against All Odds official began with a standard match between Elix Skipper and Petey Williams, who was accompanied by Coach D'Amore. The match ended when Skipper performed a move in which he holds his opponent upside-down and around his back. He grabs their head and falls to a seated position to cause their head and neck to be forced into the mat, a move he dubbed the Sudden Death. Skipper followed by covering Williams for the pinfall.

The following bout was a tag team match between the team of B.G. James and Jeff Hammond and Michael Shane and Kazarian. James and Hammond were the victors in the encounter after Hammond dropped onto Kazarian with his elbow cocked to gain the pinfall.

The third contest pitted Raven against Dustin Rhodes in a standard match. After a few minutes of fighting, Raven pinned Rhodes with a roll-up style pin-attempt.

The NWA World Tag Team Championship was on the line in the encounter between the champions, America's Most Wanted (Chris Harris and James Storm), and Kid Kash and Lance Hoyt. The match ended when America's Most Wanted performed their finishing maneuver the Death Sentence, which saw Storm wrap his arms around Hoyt and squeeze tightly while Harris jumped off the top turnbuckle and performed a legdrop across his neck and head. America's Most Wanted followed by covering Hoyt to retain the World Tag Team Championship.

=== Main event matches ===
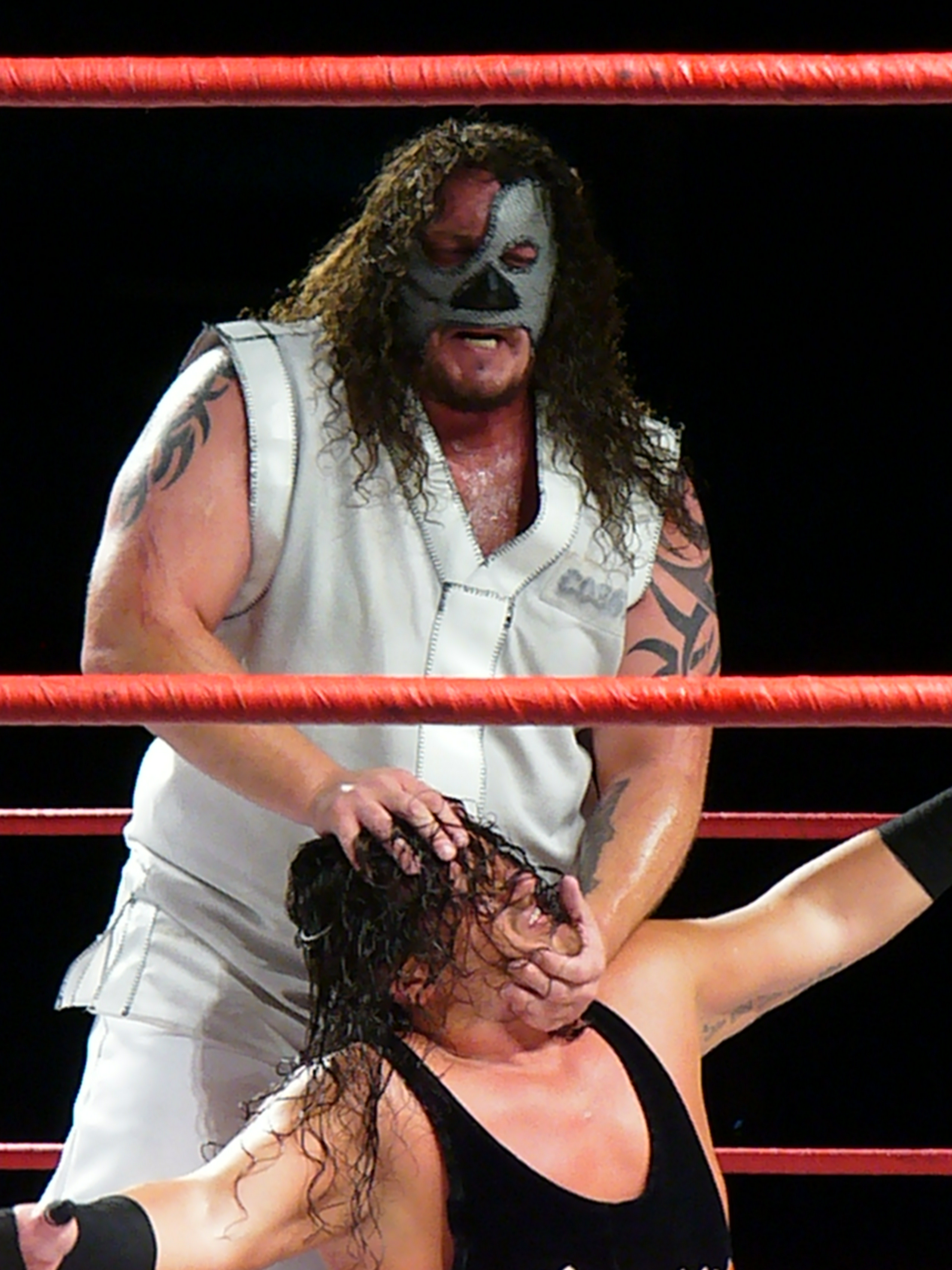
Abyss defeated Jeff Hardy in a Full Metal Mayhem match at Against All Odds to win a future NWA World Heavyweight Championship match.

The fifth contest was a Full Metal Mayhem match for a future match on Impact! for the NWA World Heavyweight Championship. Early in the match, Abyss placed two tables side-by-side and then stacked two more on top of those at ringside. Mid-way through the match, Hardy grabbed Abyss and placed him on a table at the top of the entrance ramp, he then ascended to the roof of the entrance ramp and performed a front-flip, landing on Abyss in a move Hardy calls the Swanton Bomb. In the final minutes of the match, Hardy climbed a ladder and retrieved one of the envelopes, however, it was empty which meant the last one held the future championship match. Hardy then tried to move the ladder and retrieve the second envelope. While he was climbing again, Abyss grabbed him and pulled him down, he then threw Hardy against the ropes. When Hardy connected with the ropes, he flipped over them and crashed through the four tables set up earlier in the match. Abyss followed by climbing the ladder and removing the envelope to win the match.

The next bout was between the team of Diamond Dallas Page (DDP) and Monty Brown and Team Canada (Bobby Roode and Eric Young), who were accompanied by Coach D'Amore and Johnny Devine. DDP and Brown were the winners of the contest after DDP grabbed Young around the head and neck, jumped forward and landed on his back to force Young's face into the mat and his shoulder. DDP followed by covering Young for the pinfall and the win.

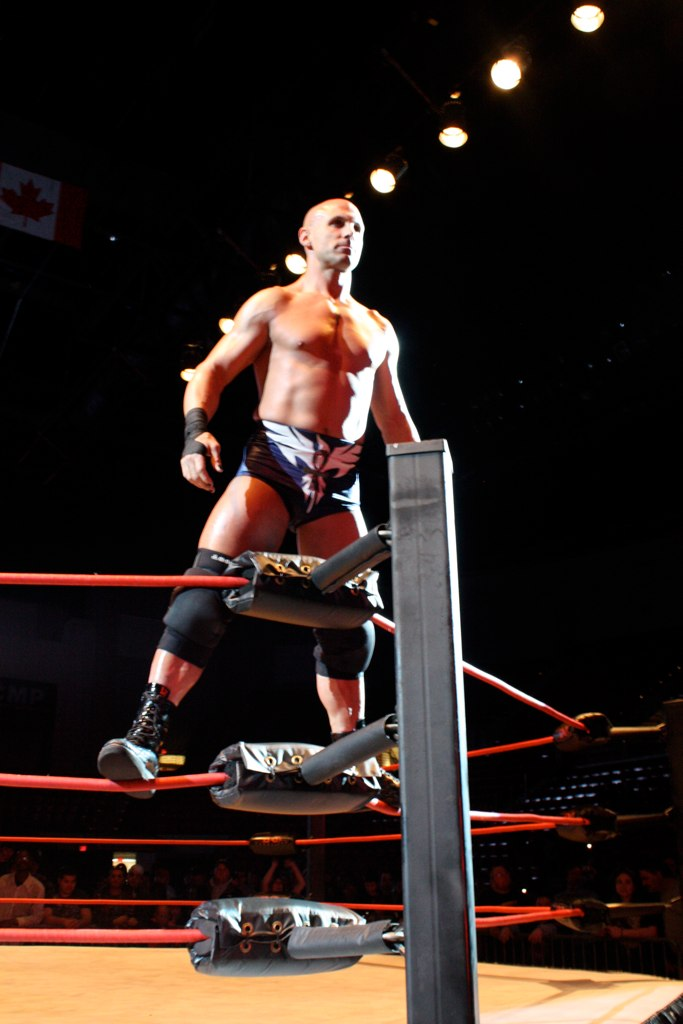
Christopher Daniels fought A.J. Styles in an Iron Man match at Against All Odds for the TNA X Division Championship.

The TNA X Division Championship was contested for in an Iron Man match in the seventh match, as then-champion, A.J. Styles, defended the title against Christopher Daniels. The first fall of the match came when Daniels pinned Styles following bending Styles forward, placing Styles' head between his legs, tucked Styles' arms behind Styles' back, lifted him up, turned 90°, and dropped to the mat to force Styles' face into the mat in what Daniels dubbed the Angel's Wings. Styles scored the second fall by pinning Daniels with a roll-up, tying the match one fall apiece. Before the deciding fall to break the tie could take place, the thirty-minute time limit ran out. Daniels then demanded the match go into overtime/sudden death, which he was granted by Dusty Rhodes. The deciding pinfall saw Styles grab Daniels, lift him up, hold him upside down, trap Daniels' arms behind his legs, and jump forward to implant Daniels entire body into the mat in a move Styles dubbed the Styles Clash to retain the X Division Championship.

The main event was for the NWA World Heavyweight Championship, in which defending champion, Jeff Jarrett, fought Kevin Nash. During the match, since Jarrett couldn't use his trademark guitar, Jarrett used a similar instrument, a cello. Jarrett went to hit Nash with the cello, however it broke before he could swing it. Later, Nash grabbed the broken cello and placed it on the canvass. He then followed by lifting up Jarrett onto his shoulders and dropping him onto the cello to perform what he dubbed the Jackknife Powerbomb. While lifting Jarrett, Nash accidentally knocked out the referee. With the referee unconscious, no one could count the pinfall. Monty Sopp then made his debut in TNA and attacked Nash, which led to a fight between the two. After the conclusion to the brawl, referee's tried to remove Sopp from the ringside area. Sean Waltman then made his debut in TNA and attacked Jarrett, which also led to a fight between them. A while later the match came to an end, when Jarrett hit Nash in the groin, grabbed him, and tripped him, which caused him to fall and force his face into the canvass, which completed Jarrett's finishing maneuver the Stroke. Jarrett then covered Nash for the pinfall victory and to retain the NWA World Heavyweight Championship.

== Aftermath ==
After Against All Odds, Jarrett went on to fight Diamond Dallas Page at Destination X in a Ringside Revenge match for the NWA World Heavyweight Championship. The match was announced on the Impact! following Against All Odds. The match was changed to a Ringside Revenge match on the March 4 episode of Impact!. Jarrett was victorious and retained the championship at the event.

A.J. Styles went on to Destination X to defend the TNA X Division Championship in an Ultimate X Challenge match. An Ultimate X Challenge match has three stages. Stage one involves the four men being paired up into two tag teams and having a standard tag team match, with the person who is pinned being eliminated from the bout. Then it becomes a standard match involving three people, with the one being pinned in that phase being eliminated from the match. The final two then fight to climb the ropes and retrieve the championship that hangs in the middle. The participants were announced for the match on the March 11 episode of Impact!, with Elix Skipper and Ron Killings being added to face Styles. The final participant was determined in a match that pitted Christopher Daniels against Chris Sabin, which Daniels won. Styles would lose the championship to Daniels at the event.

Kevin Nash went on to fight Monty Sopp, newly dubbed The Outlaw, in a First Blood match at Destination X, in which the only way to win is to make your opponent bleed. The match was officially announced on the March 11 episode of Impact!. The Outlaw would claim victory in the match.

Abyss and Jeff Hardy continued their feud at Destination X in a Falls Count Anywhere match, which was announced on the February 18 episode of Impact!. Hardy went on to win the encounter.

== Reception ==
Canadian Online Explorer writer Jason Clevett rated the entire event 7 out of 10 stars, which was the same rating as the 2006 event. The Iron Man match for the TNA X Division Championship was rated 9 out of 10 stars. The main event match for the NWA World Heavyweight Championship was rated a 7 out of 10 stars, the lesser of the two. When Clevett spoke of the Iron Man match, he said it "met expectations". His comments on the main event were a bit different as he said it was "entertaining" and a "decent match" overall. The event was released on DVD on November 15, 2005, by TNA Home Video.

== Results ==
No.	Results	Stipulations	Times
1^{P}	Phi Delta Slam (Bruno Sassi and Big Tilly) defeated Lex Lovett and Buck Quartermain	Tag team match	3:48
2^{P}	Harris Brothers (Don Harris and Ron Harris) defeated Mikey Batts and Jerelle Clark	Tag team match	3:12
3	Elix Skipper defeated Petey Williams (with Coach D'Amore)	Singles match to determine #1 contender to the TNA X Division Championship	7:58
4	B.G. James and Jeff Hammond (with Ron Killings and Konnan) defeated Michael Shane and Kazarian	Tag team match	5:33
5	Raven defeated Dustin Rhodes	Singles match	8:20
6	America's Most Wanted (Chris Harris and James Storm) (c) defeated Kid Kash and Lance Hoyt	Tag team match for the NWA World Tag Team Championship	12:25
7	Abyss defeated Jeff Hardy	Full Metal Mayhem match to determine #1 contender to the NWA World Heavyweight Championship	15:21
8	Diamond Dallas Page and Monty Brown defeated Team Canada (Eric Young and Bobby Roode) (with Coach D'Amore and Johnny Devine)	Tag team match	9:43
9	A.J. Styles (c) defeated Christopher Daniels 2-1 in overtime	30-minute Iron Man match for the TNA X Division Championship	31:42
10	Jeff Jarrett (c) defeated Kevin Nash	Singles match for the NWA World Heavyweight Championship	19:45
(c) / – the champion(s) heading into the match; P / – the match was broadcast on the pre-show

=== Iron Man Match ===
A.J. Styles defeated Christopher Daniels to retain the TNA X Division Championship. It was a draw after 30 minutes, but Director of Authority Dusty Rhodes ordered for sudden death overtime.

Score		Point winner	Decision	Notes	Time
Styles	Daniels	Point winner	Decision	Notes	Time
0	1	Christopher Daniels	Pinfall	Daniels pinned Styles after the Angel's Wings	14:30
1	1	A.J. Styles	Pinfall	Styles pinned Daniels with a roll-up	24:00
2	1	A.J. Styles	Pinfall	Styles pinned Daniels after the Styles Clash	31:42
