= Destination X (2005) =

2005 Total Nonstop Action Wrestling pay-per-view event

- Promotional poster featuring Diamond Dallas Page
- Promotion: Total Nonstop Action Wrestling
- Date: March 13, 2005
- City: Orlando, Florida
- Venue: TNA Impact! Zone
- Attendance: 775

Pay-per-view chronology
← Previous; Against All Odds	Next → Lockdown

Destination X chronology
← Previous; First	Next → 2006

The 2005 Destination X was a professional wrestling pay-per-view (PPV) event produced by the Total Nonstop Action Wrestling (TNA) promotion, which took place on March 13, 2005 at the TNA Impact! Zone in Orlando, Florida. It was the first event under the Destination X chronology. Nine matches and two preshow matches were featured on the event's card.

The main event was a Ringside Revenge match for the NWA World Heavyweight Championship between the champion, Jeff Jarrett, and the challenger, Diamond Dallas Page (DDP), in which Jarrett retained the title. Another featured match was an Ultimate X Challenge for the TNA X Division Championship involving A.J. Styles, Christopher Daniels, Ron Killings, and Elix Skipper. Daniels was declared the winner of the contest, thus winning the championship from Styles. The Outlaw versus Kevin Nash in a Taped Fist First Blood match and Abyss versus Jeff Hardy in a Falls Count Anywhere match were two matches also featured on the card. The Outlaw and Hardy won their respective encounters.

This event is the only time the Ultimate X Challenge variation of the Ultimate X match has been used. Chris Sokol of the professional wrestling section of the Canadian Online Explorer website felt the event was a "tremendous PPV". The event was down by 10,000 from previous TNA PPV events.

== Production ==
=== Background ===
Destination X was announced in early 2005 to be taking place on March 13, with the location unknown but anticipated to be the TNA Impact! Zone in Orlando, Florida. On January 24, 2005 a TNA press release confirmed that the event would be held in Orlando. Sometime prior to the event, TNA released a promotional poster for the event featuring Diamond Dallas Page. An idea considered during the planning stages of the PPV, was to host a one-night X Division tournament similar to the Super J-Cup held by New Japan Pro-Wrestling. Holding an Ultimate X match was also planned. After TNA's previous PPV event, Against All Odds, TNA created a section about Destination X on their official website. In early-March 2005 TNA announced they would be holding a 30-minute pre-show prior to the event featuring two matches: Chris Candido and Andy Douglas versus Lex Lovett and Buck Quartermain; Kid Kash and Lance Hoyt versus Cassidy Riley and Jerrelle Clark.

=== Storylines ===
Destination X featured nine professional wrestling matches and two pre-show matches that involved different wrestlers from pre-existing scripted feuds and storylines. Wrestlers portrayed villains, heroes, or less distinguishable characters in the scripted events that built tension and culminated in a wrestling match or series of matches.

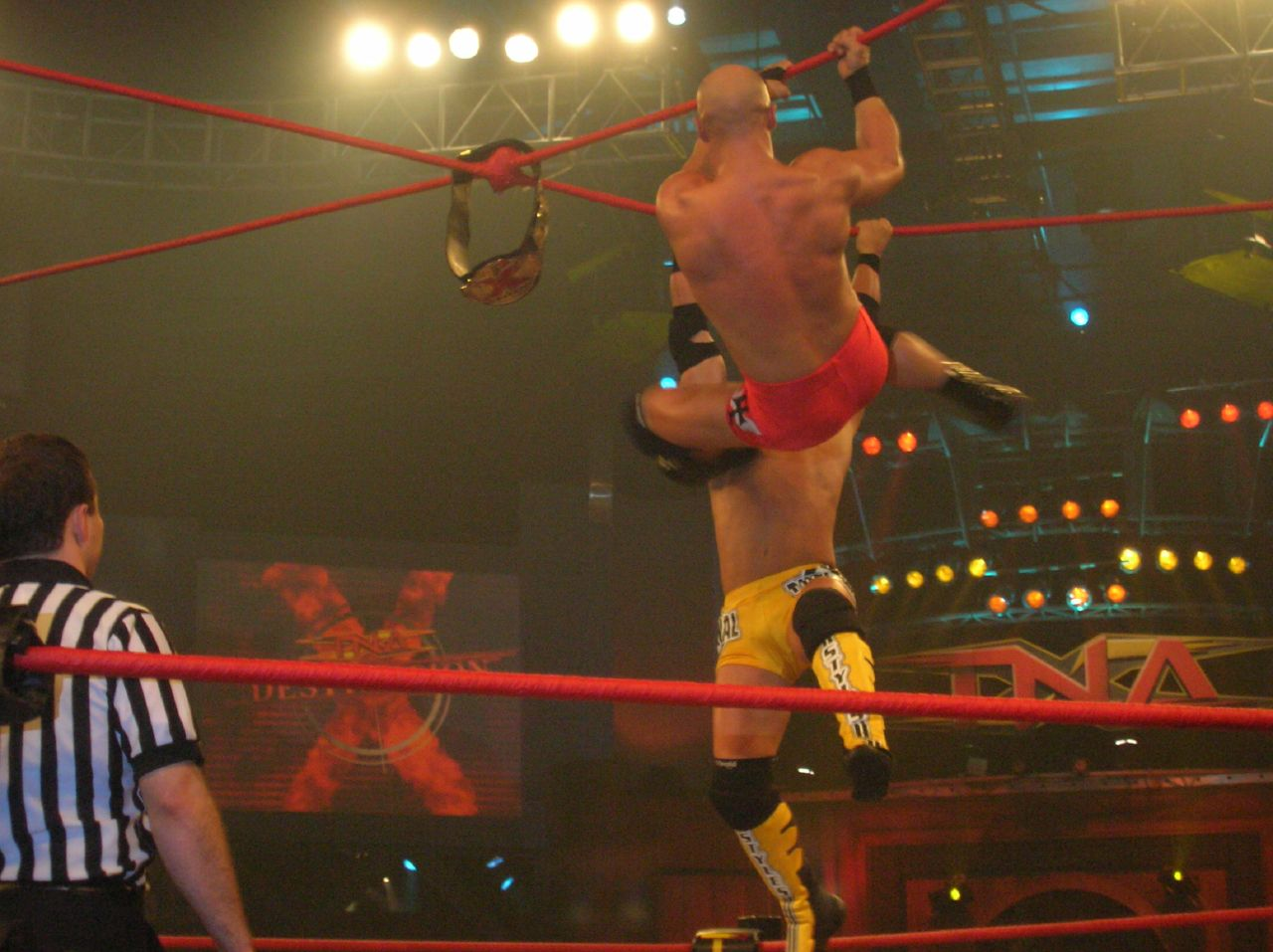
Christopher Daniels [red trunks] and A.J. Styles [yellow trunks] competing in an Ultimate X match

The main event was a Ringside Revenge match for the NWA World Heavyweight Championship between the champion, Jeff Jarrett, and the challenger, Diamond Dallas Page (DDP). On February 4, Fox Sports Net's The Best Damn Sports Show Period held a special episode named "The Best Darn Super Bowl Road Show Period". During the broadcast, TNA wrestlers DDP, Kevin Nash, Monty Brown, and Jarrett were involved in a segment where they debated over who would win at Super Bowl XXXIX between the New England Patriots and the Philadelphia Eagles. The segment concluded with Jarrett attempting to bash an acoustic guitar over Nash's head, due to the two being involved in a match at the Against All Odds PPV event on February 13. DDP, however, thrust Nash out of the way and was struck by the guitar instead. On the February 18 episode of TNA's television program TNA Impact!, Director of Authority Dusty Rhodes announced that Jarrett's next title defense would be against DDP at Destination X. On the March 4 episode of Impact!, Rhodes announced the match would be held under a stipulation—the ringside would be occupied by wrestlers who had previously been attacked by Jarrett.

TNA play-by-play commentator Mike Tenay announced on the February 11 episode of Impact! that TNA were planning to host an Ultimate X match at their March PPV event. On the February 18 episode of Impact!, Tenay announced that the Ultimate X match at Destination X would be contested for the TNA X Division Championship, TNA would be hosting qualifying matches to fill the remaining spots leading up to the event, and that the match would be contested under special rules: The match would follow a series of stages; stage one being a tag team match until a pinfall or submission eliminates a competitor; stage two being a Three Way match until another pinfall or submission eliminates a competitor; and in stage three the match would fall to standard Ultimate X match rules, with the two remaining wrestlers having to climb the structure to retrieve the championship belt which hung above the ring. On the March 4 episode of Impact!, Styles defeated Kid Kash to retain the X Division Championship and earn his spot in the Ultimate X match. On the March 11 episode of Impact!, it was announced that Ron Killings and Elix Skipper were slated to participate. Christopher Daniels earned the final spot by defeating Chris Sabin later in the same episode.

Several matches on the undercard were promoted for the event. Build to Jeff Hardy versus Abyss in a Falls Count Anywhere match began at TNA's Final Resolution PPV event on January 16, where Abyss attacked Hardy after his match with Scott Hall. This led to a match at Against All Odds, in which Abyss defeated Hardy in a Full Metal Mayhem match. On the February 18 episode of Impact!, Rhodes announced their match at Destination X. Set-up for the bout between Nash and The New Age Outlaw (NAO) started at Against All Odds, where Nash faced Jarrett for the NWA World Heavyweight Championship. During the contest the debuting NAO interfered aiding Jarrett. On the February 18 episode of Impact!, Nash and NAO was involved in a small brawl. Later in the episode, Tenay announced that Nash and NAO would face in a No Disqualification match at Destination X. Another encounter promoted prior to the event was the Bullrope match between Raven and Dustin Rhodes. The pair previously met in a match at Against All Odds, which Raven won. On the February 18 episode of Impact!, Dustin announced a rematch for Destination X in a Bullrope match.

== Event ==
Other on-screen personnel
Commentator	Mike Tenay
Commentator	Don West
Ring announcer	Jeremy Borash
Referee	Rudy Charles
Referee	Mark "Slick" Johnson
Referee	Andrew Thomas
Interviewers	Jeremy Borash
Interviewers	Shane Douglas

=== Pre-Show ===
Prior to the event's commencement, two matches were held during the 30 minute pre-show. The first match pitted the teams of Chris Candido and Andy Douglas against Lex Lovett and Buck Quartermain. It lasted 7 minutes and 58 seconds, which Candido and Douglas won after Candido performed a diving headbutt from the top of a padded turnbuckle onto Buck and covered for the pinfall.

The second lasted 8 minutes and 45 seconds, pitting the team of Kid Kash and Lance Hoyt against the team of Cassidy Riley and Jerrelle Clark. Kash and Hoyt came out the victors in the contest following Kash gaining the pinfall after slamming Clark into the mat by performing his signature maneuver the Money Maker.

=== On-air employees ===
The event featured employees other than the wrestlers involved in the matches. Mike Tenay and Don West were the commentators for the telecast. Jeremy Borash was the ring announcer for the event. Andrew Thomas, Rudy Charles, and Mark "Slick" Johnson participated as referees for the encounters. Besides employees appearing in a wrestling role, Coach D'Amore, Johnny Devine, Andy Douglas, Chris Candido, Traci, Trinity, Dusty Rhodes, Larry Zbyszko, Dirk Diggler, Jonny Fairplay, Shocker, Buck Quartermain, and Lex Lovett all appeared on camera, either in backstage or ringside segments. Jimmy Hart was reported to have been backstage during the show. It was reported following the event, that TNA wrestler Petey Williams performed with an injury during the eight man tag team match which he had sustained the night before.

=== Preliminary matches ===
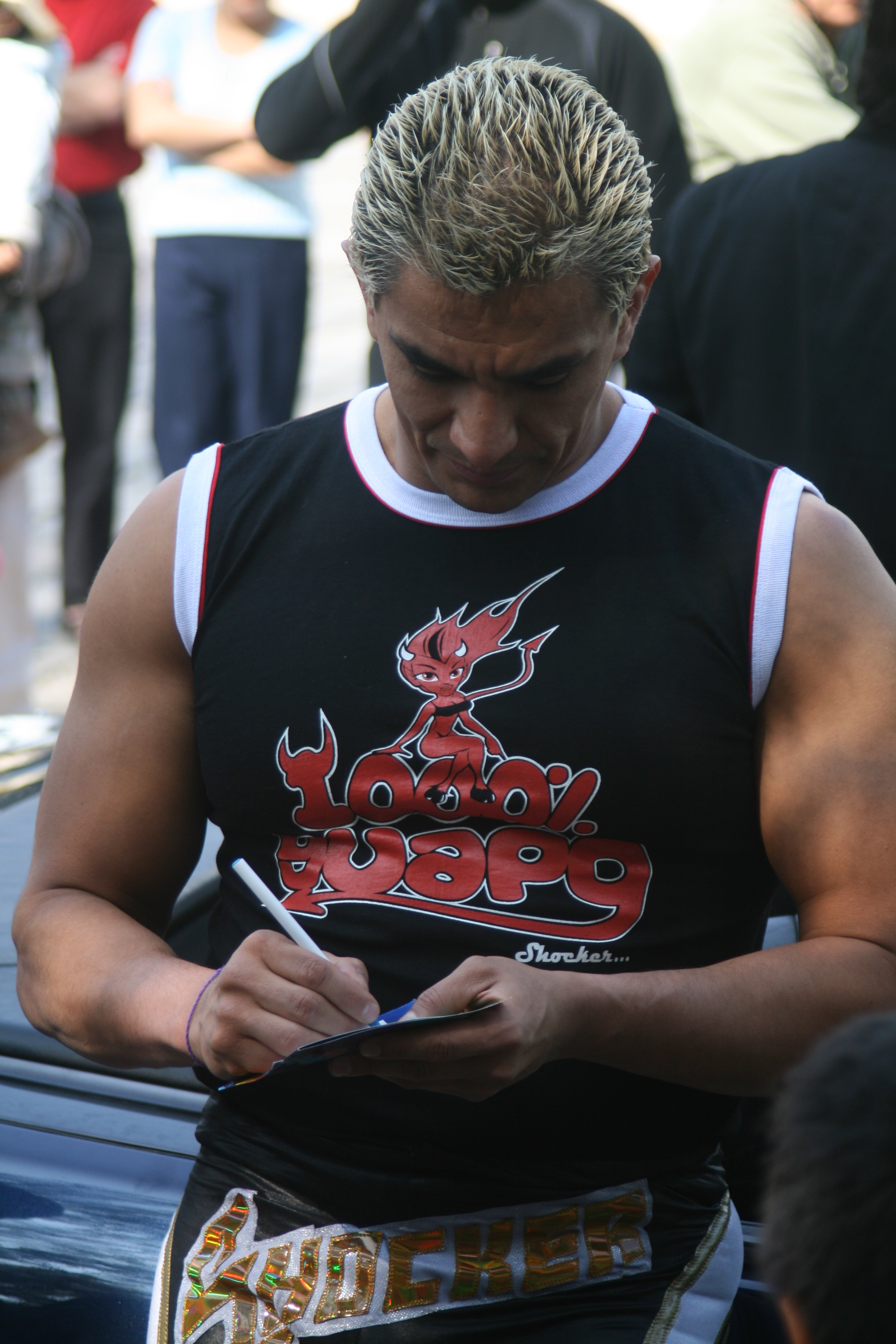
Shocker made his TNA debut at Destination X.

The opening contest was an eight-man tag team match pitting the teams of the 3Live Kru (B.G. James and Konnan) and America's Most Wanted (Chris Harris and James Storm) against Alex Jerrell, Bobby Roode, Eric Young, and Petey Williams, who were accompanied by Coach D'Amore and Johnny Devine, collectively known as Team Canada. The match lasted 8 minutes and 52 seconds before concluding following Roode hitting the back of Konnan's head with his forearm then covering for the pinfall.

Chris Sabin fought Chase Stevens, who was accompanied by Andy Douglas and Chris Candido, in the following match. The duration of the bout was 6 minutes and 18 seconds. Sabin won the contest after countering a roll-up pin attempt by Stevens, into one of his own for the three count. After the bout, Stevens, Douglas, and Candido proceeded to attack Sabin until Shocker made his TNA debut, coming to the aid of Sabin.

A bullrope match was held between Dustin Rhodes and Raven, which lasted 6 minutes and 10 seconds. In a bullrope match, both competitors are tied together during the duration of the match by a bullrope with the only way to win being pinfall or submission. Dustin won the encounter following slamming Raven face-first into a steel chair and covering him for the pinfall.

Don and Ron Harris, known as The Disciples of Destruction and representatives of Traci, were pitted against Phi Delta Slam(Bruno Sassi and Big Tilly), representatives of Trinity, in a tag team match. The pre-match stipulation for the contest was that whoever the winning team represented would become the personal assistant of Director of Authority Dusty Rhodes. The two teams fought for 10 minutes and 18 seconds before a pinfall occurred, as a result of Ron kicking Big Tilly in the face.

The fifth encounter was Monty Brown versus Trytan; its duration was 5 minutes and 26 seconds. Near the end of the bout, the lights went off in the building. When they came back on Trytan had left the ring, replaced by an unknown masked man. After a few seconds, Brown gained the upper hand and performed his signature maneuver the Pounce then covered the masked man for the pin, as the referee began to count. After the bout, Trytan was shown standing on the entrance ramp watching Brown, leaving the match with an unknown outcome.

=== Main event matches ===
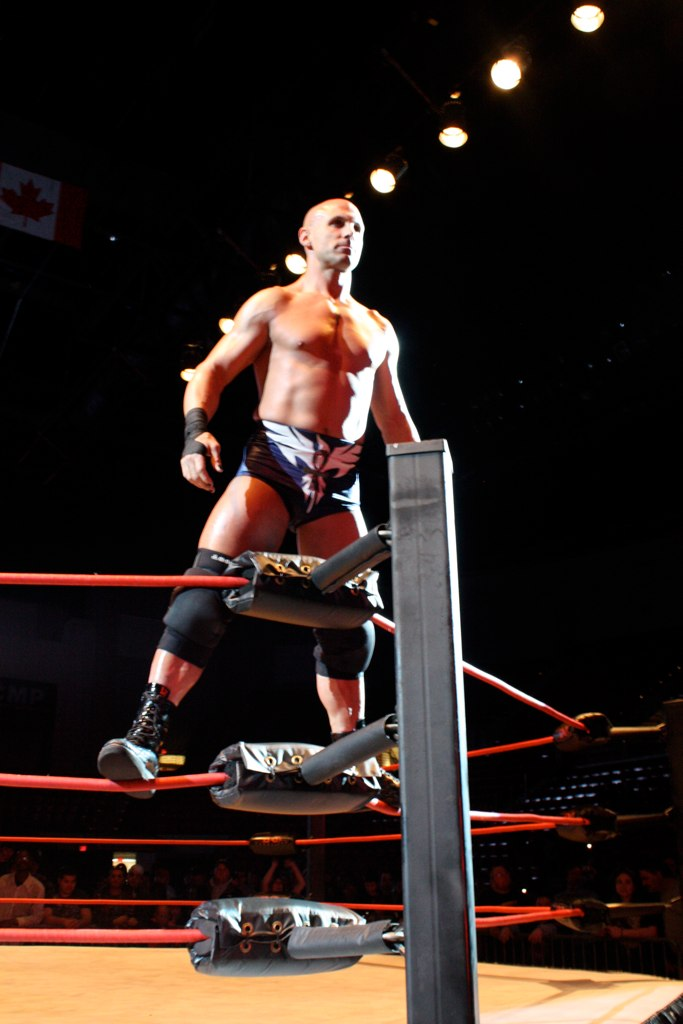
Christopher Daniels won the Ultimate X Challenge match to become the new TNA X Division Champion at Destination X.

Abyss fought Jeff Hardy in a Falls Count Anywhere match next, lasting 15 minutes and 48 seconds. Midway through the match, Hardy placed Abyss on two wooden tables, climbed up to the rafters ten feet above, then performed a Swanton Bomb onto Abyss through both tables. Hardy claimed victory in the contest after slamming Abyss into a ladder by using his signature maneuver the Twist of Fate. After the contest, Abyss attacked Hardy, covered the ring in thumbtacks, and used his signature maneuver the Black Hole Slam to drive Hardy into the tacks back first. Reported after the event, Abyss sustained an injury during this match, in which he dislocated a finger.

Kevin Nash faced The New Age Outlaw, now simply The Outlaw, in a Taped Fist First Blood match, originally advertised as a No Disqualification match. A First Blood match is fought until one of the competitors bleeds. The match lasted 11 minutes and 20 seconds. The Outlaw was the first to bleed after Nash dropped him face first into an exposed turnbuckle, however the referee had been knocked unconscious, in storyline terms, and did not see this occur. As Nash tried to revive the referee, Jeff Jarrett ran down to ringside and bashed Nash in the face with the NWA World Heavyweight Championship belt, causing him to bleed. When the referee awoke, he saw Nash was bleeding and gave the victory to The Outlaw, who had been aided by Jarrett's lawyer Dirk Diggler and a doctor in wiping away the blood on his face.

An Ultimate X match was held, promoted as an Ultimate X Challenge match, for the TNA X Division Championship, in which then-champion A.J. Styles defended the title against Christopher Daniels, Elix Skipper, and Ron Killings. It lasted 25 minutes and 19 seconds. The match began with the tag team match stage, in which the team of Styles and Skipper faced the team of Killings and Daniels. Killings was the first eliminated, as a result of Skipper using his signature maneuver the Sudden Death to slam Killings into the mat. The second stage was a Three Way match between the remaining participants. During this stage, Daniels climbed up the Ultimate X structure and performed a backflip off the center onto both Skipper and Styles. Skipper was later eliminated by Daniels using a roll-up pin. Due to this elimination, stage three began with the match falling to standard Ultimate X rules. Near the end of the bout, Styles and Daniels fell from the structure and crashed into the referee, causing him to be knocked unconscious in the storyline. Afterwards, Styles climbed and retrieved the belt. With the referee down, Daniels attacked Styles and performed his signature maneuver the Angel's Wings. Then grabbed the title belt, fell to the ground, and draped it over his chest as the referee came too. The referee then awarded Daniels' the victory upon seeing him with the title belt.

The main event was a Ringside Revenge match for the NWA World Heavyweight Championship between defending champion Jeff Jarrett and the challenger Diamond Dallas Page. The wrestlers who appeared at ringside were Konnan, Ron Killings, Monty Brown, B.G., Larry Zbyzsko, Dirk Diggler, Chris Candido, Andy Douglas, and Chase Stevens. The bout lasted 21 minutes and 40 seconds, ending when Brown interfered and Pounced DDP, then pulled an unconscious Jarrett over DDP for the pinfall.

== Reception ==
A total of 775 people attended the event, however, TNA were forced to turn away 600 people. It was said that the buyrate was down by 10,000 from previous PPV events. Canadian Online Explorer writer Chris Sokol felt the event was a "tremendous PPV". Going on to conclude that it was the "best one of the year thus far". Regarding the main event, Sokol felt it "was a given that Jarrett would retain", however felt it was "still very exciting". James Caldwell of the Pro Wrestling Torch stated in his review that he felt the Ultimate X Challenge match was "absolutely amazing". He also felt it had "plenty of psychologically sound factors mixed in with the high spots". Caldwel referred to Daniels' backflip from the Ultimate X structure represented "what athleticism and amazing pro wrestling is all about". Caldwell stated in his review that he felt that Abyss' attack on Hardy after their encounter was "amazing". As for the match, Caldwell believed it was a "great match". Wade Keller of the Pro Wrestling Torch rated the Ultimate X Challenge 4 and a quarter stars out of 5, while the main event 2 and three-quarter stars out of 5. The Falls Count Anywhere match was given 3 and a quarter stars out of 5, 1 and a half stars more than the Taped Fist First Blood match. His lowest rated match during his review was the encounter between The Disciples of Destruction and Phi Delta Slam, which he gave three-quarters of a star. The event was released on DVD on November 15, 2005 by TNA Home Video.

== Aftermath ==
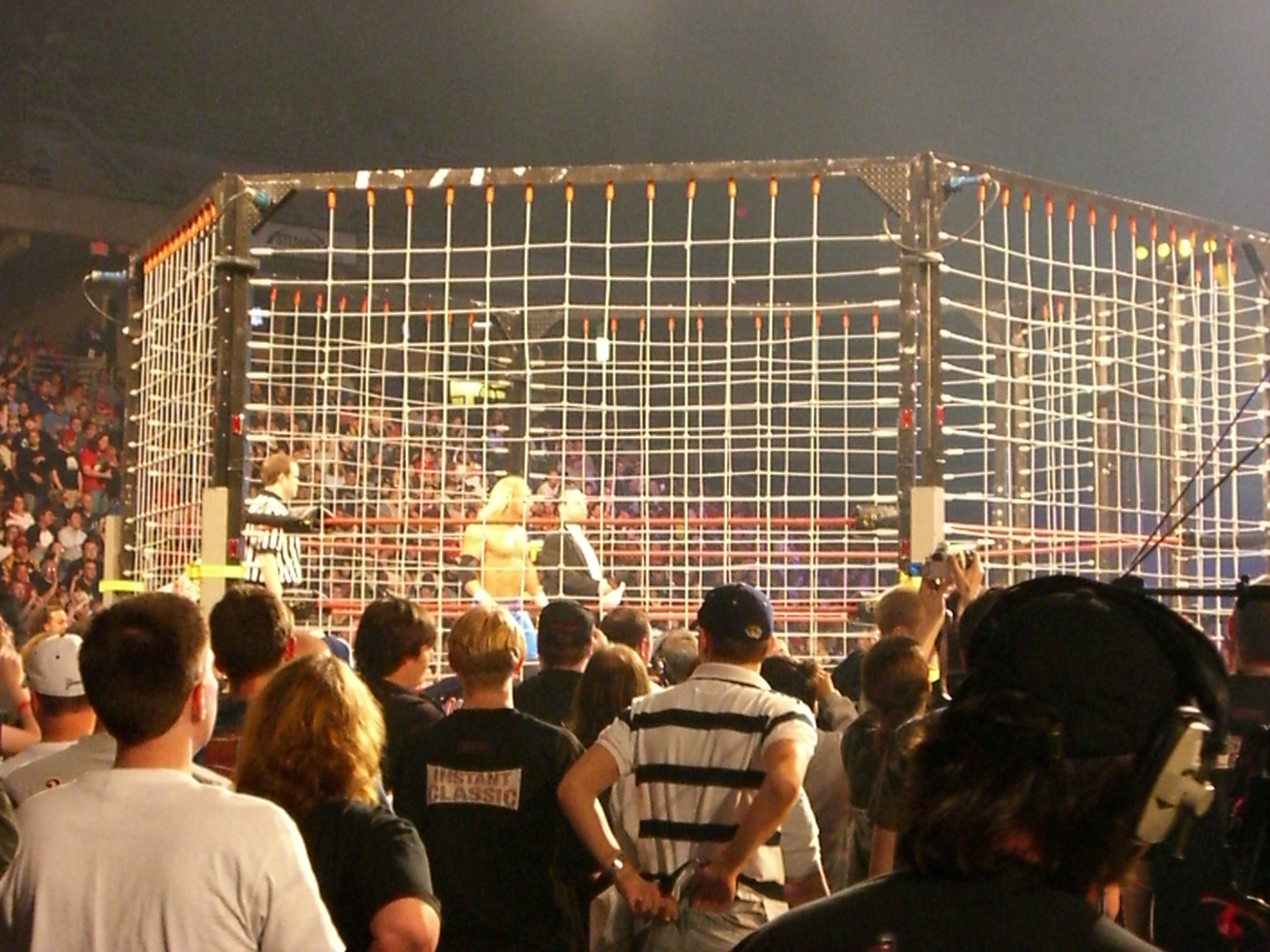
All matches contested at TNA's April pay-per-view event Lockdown were held inside the Six Sides of Steel.

TNA's next PPV after Destination X was Lockdown held on April 24. All matches held at Lockdown were conducted inside a six sided steel structure known as the Six Sides of Steel.

Following Destination X, Jeff Jarrett teamed with The Outlaw and Monty Brown under the name Team Jarrett to face Team Nash (DDP, Sean Waltman, and B.G. James) in a Lethal Lockdown match at Lockdown. The match was announced on the March 25 episode of Impact! by Director of Authority Dusty Rhodes by request of Kevin Nash. Nash was originally slated to be in the match but was removed due to an injury and replaced by B.G. James. Team Nash ended up winning the contest.

A.J. Styles fought Abyss at Lockdown in the main event. The match was announced on the April 1 episode of Impact! with the stipulation being the winner got a future NWA World Heavyweight Championship. On the April 8 episode of Impact! Rhodes announced that the winner would get their title match at TNA's May PPV event Hard Justice. Styles was the winner of the encounter at Lockdown. Styles went on to Hard Justice to defeat then-champion Jarrett to win the title.

Christopher Daniels went on to defend the TNA X Division Championship against Elix Skipper at Lockdown. Skipper won a four-way elimination match to become the number one contender on the April 1 episode of Impact!. Daniels successfully retained the title against Skipper at the event.

A Six Sides of Steel Tables match was held at Lockdown between Raven and Jeff Hardy. It was announced on the April 8 episode of Impact!. Raven ended up on the losing end of the bout.

Destination X later became an annual event, with the second installment taking place on March 12, 2006 in Orlando, Florida at the TNA Impact! Zone. The main matches promoted for the event were Christian Cage defending the NWA World Heavyweight Championship against Monty Brown and Samoa Joe defending the TNA X Division Championship against Christopher Daniels and A.J. Styles in an Ultimate X match.

== Results ==
No.	Results	Stipulations	Times
1^{P}	Chris Candido and Andy Douglas defeated Lex Lovett and Buck Quartermain	Tag team match	7:58
2^{P}	Kid Kash and Lance Hoyt defeated Cassidy Riley and Jerrelle Clark	Tag team match	8:45
3	Team Canada (Petey Williams, Eric Young, Bobby Roode and A-1) (with Coach D'Amore and Johnny Devine) defeated 3 Live Kru (Konnan and B.G. James) and America's Most Wanted (Chris Harris and James Storm)	Eight-man tag team match	8:53
4	Chris Sabin defeated Chase Stevens (with Chris Candido and Andy Douglas)	Singles match	6:18
5	Dustin Rhodes defeated Raven	Texas Bullrope match	6:10
6	The Disciples of Destruction (Don Harris and Ron Harris) (with Traci) defeated Phi Delta Slam (Bruno Sassi and Big Tilly) (with) Trinity)	Tag team match; per the pre-match stipulation, Traci became the personal assistant to Director of Authority Dusty Rhodes	10:18
7	Monty Brown vs. Trytan ended in a no contest	Singles match	5:26
8	Jeff Hardy defeated Abyss	Falls Count Anywhere match	15:48
9	The Outlaw defeated Kevin Nash	First Blood match	11:20
10	Christopher Daniels defeated A.J. Styles (c), Ron Killings and Elix Skipper	Ultimate X Challenge for the TNA X Division Championship	25:19
11	Jeff Jarrett (c) defeated Diamond Dallas Page	Ringside Revenge match for the NWA World Heavyweight Championship	21:40
(c) / – the champion(s) heading into the match; P / – the match was broadcast on the pre-show
