= TNA Lockdown (2005) =

2005 Total Nonstop Action Wrestling pay-per-view event

Lockdown (2005)
- Promotional poster featuring [from left to right] Kevin Nash, Diamond Dallas Page, A.J. Styles, Jeff Jarrett, and The Outlaw
- Promotion: Total Nonstop Action Wrestling
- Date: April 24, 2005
- City: Orlando, Florida
- Venue: TNA Impact! Zone
- Attendance: 775

Pay-per-view chronology
← Previous; Destination X	Next → Hard Justice

Lockdown chronology
← Previous; First	Next → 2006

The 2005 Lockdown was a professional wrestling pay-per-view (PPV) event produced by the Total Nonstop Action Wrestling (TNA) promotion, which took place on April 24, 2005, at the TNA Impact! Zone in Orlando, Florida. It was the first event under the Lockdown chronology and the fourth event in the 2005 TNA PPV schedule. Eight professional wrestling matches and one pre-show match were featured on the event's card. Every match took place inside a six sided steel structure known as the Six Sides of Steel. As a result, Lockdown was the first-ever all steel cage event held in professional wrestling.

The main event was for a NWA World Heavyweight Championship match at TNA's Hard Justice PPV event between A.J. Styles and Abyss. Styles won the match, thus earning his title shot against then-champion Jeff Jarrett at Hard Justice. TNA held the first-ever Lethal Lockdown match during the event. It pitted Team Nash (Diamond Dallas Page, Sean Waltman, and B.G. James) against Team Jarrett (Jeff Jarrett, Monty Brown, and The Outlaw), which Team Nash won. Kevin Nash was originally supposed to take part in the match but was removed due to sickness and was replaced with James. The TNA X Division Championship defense by Christopher Daniels against Elix Skipper was another highly promoted match for the event. Daniels won the bout and successfully retained the title. Jeff Hardy versus Raven in a Six Sides of Steel Tables match was featured on the card, which Hardy won.

This event marked the introduction of the Lethal Lockdown and Xscape matches, which became annually held matches at future Lockdown events. During the event, Chris Candido broke his leg during a tag team match with Lance Hoyt against Apolo and Sonny Siaki, which days later led to Candido's post-surgery death from pneumonia.

Jason Clevett of the professional wrestling section of the Canadian Online Explorer rated the event a 6 out of 10, two marks lower than the 2006 event's ranking by Chris Sokol.

== Production ==
=== Background ===
TNA announced in a January 24, 2005, press release that they planned to host a PPV titled Lockdown on April 24, 2005 at the TNA Impact! Zone in Orlando, Florida. In late-February 2005, In Demand ran a preview and stated that there would be two steel cage matches held at Lockdown. A Six Man Tag Team match that featured Sean Waltman was thrown around prior to the event. TNA created a section for the event on their official website before it started. On the April 8, 2005 episode of TNA's television program TNA Impact!, Director of Authority (DOA) Dusty Rhodes announced that all matches at Lockdown would be held inside a six sided steel structure known as the Six Sides of Steel. TNA followed up with a press release through their website that confirmed this. TNA issued a parental advisory a few days after the announcement due to violence associated with steel cage matches. A thirty-minute pre-show was planned before the spectacle that featured a Three Way Tag Team match between 3Live Kru (Ron Killings and Konnan), David Young and Lex Lovett, and The Naturals (Andy Douglas and Chase Stevens).

=== Storylines ===
Lockdown featured eight professional wrestling matches and one pre-show match that involved different wrestlers from pre-existing scripted feuds and storylines. Wrestlers portrayed villains, heroes, or less distinguishable characters in the scripted events that built tension and that culminated into a wrestling match or series of matches. Every match was contested inside the Six Sides of Steel.

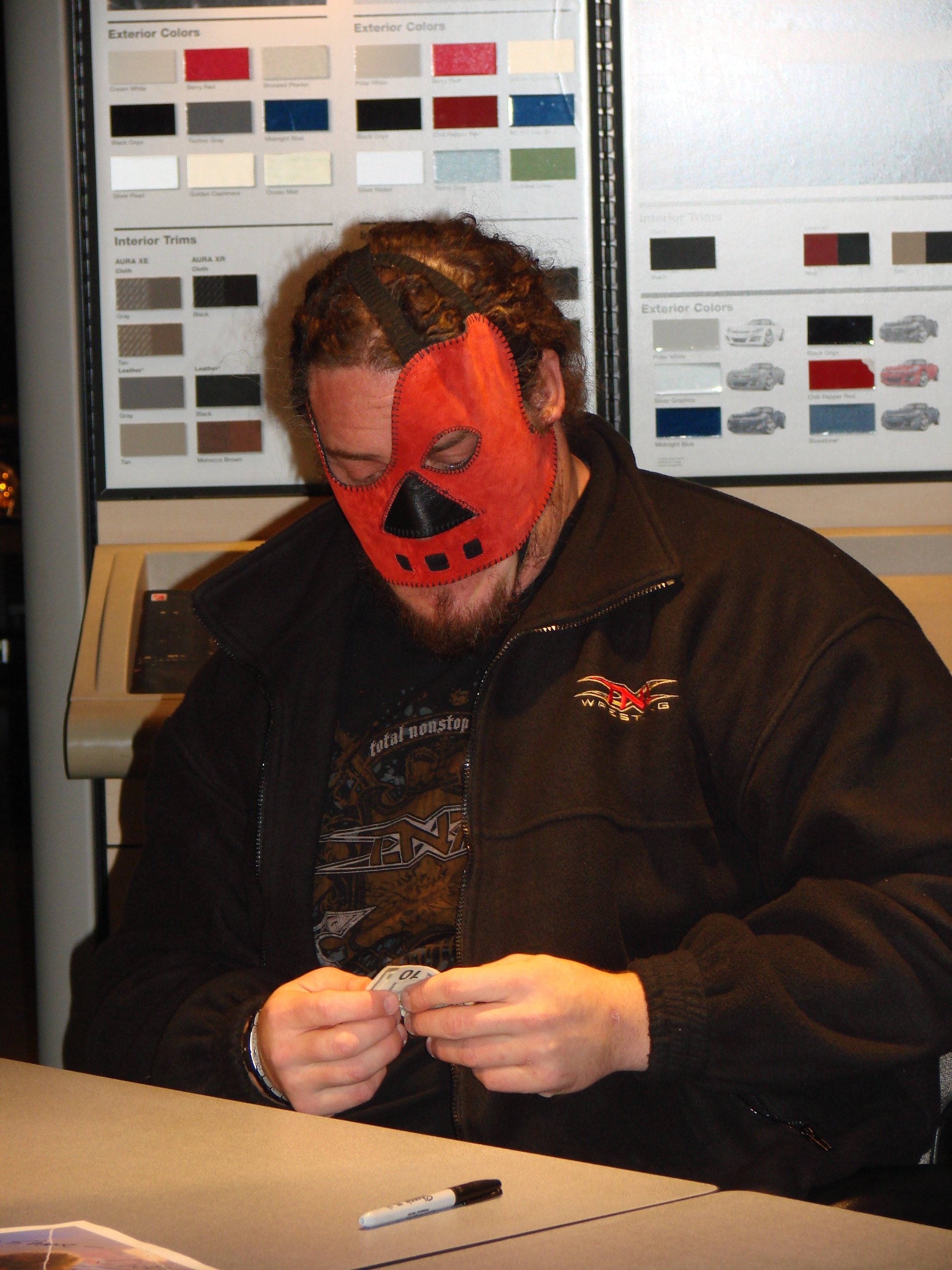
Abyss fought A.J. Styles in the main event of Lockdown.

Before the announcement that all matches be held inside the Six Sides of Steel, TNA advertised that only two would be under such rules. These two matches later became the headlining bouts for the card. The first was announced on the March 25 episode of Impact! as Team Nash (Kevin Nash, Sean Waltman, and Diamond Dallas Page) versus Team Jarrett (Jeff Jarrett, Monty Brown, and The Outlaw). Abyss versus A.J. Styles for a future NWA World Heavyweight Championship match was the second announced on the April 1 episode of Impact!, which became the main event of the gathering. The storyline behind Styles versus Abyss began at TNA's Against All Odds PPV event on February 13, where Abyss defeated Jeff Hardy in a Full Metal Mayhem match to earn a future NWA World Heavyweight Championship title shot. During a backstage segment on the February 18 episode of Impact!, Abyss gave the title match contract to Traci, wanting it given to DOA Dusty Rhodes as she was trying to become Rhodes' personal assistant at the time. On the March 25 episode of Impact!, Abyss tried to retrieve his contract from now co-assistant to Rhodes, Traci. This led to a brawl with Styles as he tried to defend Traci and co-assistant Trinity as they fled in fear from Abyss. The match was then announced on the April 1 episode of Impact!. Rhodes announced on the April 8 episode of Impact! that the winner of the bout would get their title shot at TNA's Hard Justice PPV event on May 15.

Team Nash versus Team Jarrett began on the March 18 episode of Impact! when Nash requested a six-man tag team cage match at Lockdown from Rhodes. The following week, Rhodes granted the request and officially announced it for the Lockdown card. On the April 8 episode of Impact!, Rhodes proclaimed that the encounter was now a Lethal Lockdown match, in which weapons were legal and one wrestler from each team started the match. Afterwards, members from each team entered at time intervals until all wrestlers were involved in the bout so a pinfall or submission could occur. The storyline behind this encounter revolved around Jarrett and his reign as NWA World Heavyweight Champion. At Against All Odds, Jarrett successfully defended the title against Nash, which Waltman and The Outlaw interfered with by aiding Nash and Jarrett, respectively. At TNA's previous PPV event Destination X on March 13, Jarrett defended the title against Page, in which Brown turned on Page by helping Jarrett retain the title.

Elix Skipper challenged Christopher Daniels for the TNA X Division Championship at Lockdown. The build to this encounter began on the March 18 episode of Impact!, when Skipper interrupted Daniels after a match and hinted at a future encounter. On the March 25 episode of Impact!, TNA commentator Mike Tenay announced that a four-way elimination match involving Chris Sabin, Michael Shane, Skipper, and Petey Williams would be held on the April 1 episode of Impact! to determine Daniels' opponent for the title at Lockdown. Skipper went on to win the match the following week, earning the opportunity to challenge for the title. The main surrounding storyline was that Daniels and Skipper used to be tag team partners as part of the group Triple X, which disbanded after losing a Six Sides of Steel Cage match against America's Most Wanted (Chris Harris and James Storm) at TNA's Turning Point PPV event on December 5, 2004. Jeff Hardy fought Raven in a Six Sides of Steel Tables match at Lockdown. On the March 25 episode of Impact!, Raven offered Hardy an alliance, which Hardy turned down. On the April 1 episode of Impact!, Raven attacked Hardy during an incident between Hardy and Abyss. Rhodes announced that the two would face at Lockdown in a Six Sides of Steel Tables match on the April 8 episode of Impact!.

== Event ==
Other on-screen personnel
Commentator	Mike Tenay
Commentator	Don West
Ring announcer	Jeremy Borash
Referee	Rudy Charles
Referee	Mark "Slick" Johnson
Referee	Andrew Thomas
Interviewers	Jeremy Borash
Interviewers	Shane Douglas

=== Pre-Show ===
Prior to the event's commencement, TNA held a thirty-minute pre-show. It featured a Three Way Tag Team match between the 3Live Kru (Ron Killings and Konnan), the team of David Young and Lex Lovett, and The Naturals (Andy Douglas and Chase Stevens), who were accompanied by Chris Candido, which lasted 6 minutes and 34 seconds. 3Live Kru were the victors in the contest after Killings gained the pinfall by forcing Young's face into the mat.

=== On-air employees ===
The event featured employees other than the wrestlers involved in the matches. Mike Tenay and Don West were the commentators for the telecast. Jeremy Borash was the ring announcer for the event. Andrew Thomas, Rudy Charles, and Mark "Slick" Johnson participated as referees for the encounters. Besides employees who appeared in a wrestling role, Kevin Nash, Coach D'Amore, A-1, Traci, Trinity, and DOA Dusty Rhodes all appeared on camera, either in backstage or in ringside segments. TNA announced via their official website a few days prior to the event that Kevin Nash would be unable to appear in the Lethal Lockdown match due to a staph infection. This was explained at the start of the telecast, and DOA Rhodes would announce Nash's replacement later during the event.

=== Preliminary matches ===
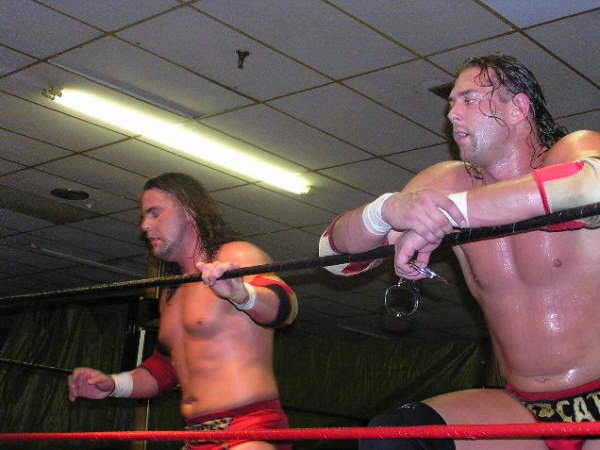
America's Most Wanted (Chris Harris and James Storm) defended the NWA World Tag Team Championship against Team Canada (Eric Young and Petey Williams) at Lockdown.

The show opened with a Six Sides of Steel Tag Team Cage match that pitted the team of Apolo and Sonny Siaki against Chris Candido and Lance Hoyt, which lasted 6 minutes and 58 seconds. This was originally promoted as a bout between Hoyt and Apolo but was changed at the event. During the opening minutes, Candido suffered a bad fall and was helped to the backstage area. Siaki and Apolo won the contest after Siaki performed a splash from the top of a padded turnbuckle on Hoyt.

Dustin Rhodes fought Bobby Roode, who was accompanied by Coach D'Amore and A-1, in what was billed as a Prince of Darkness match next. The duration of the bout was 15 minutes and 20 seconds. In this contest, there would be three falls, but the third fall would be contested under blindfold match rules, in which both wrestlers wore hoods over their heads. Roode earned the first fall with a roll-up pin, and Dustin earned the second one when he forced Roode face-first into the mat from the top rope. During the third fall, both wrestlers wore black hoods that impaired their vision, causing Dustin to accidentally knock the referee unconscious in storyline terms. Due to this, D'Amore opened the cage door and passed Roode a steel folding chair. Roode then attempted to bash Dustin with it but instead mistakenly struck D'Amore. Dustin then grabbed the chair and struck Roode with it, which gave him the pinfall as the referee came to.

TNA held the first-ever Xscape match between Shocker, Michael Shane (who was accompanied Trinity), Sonjay Dutt, and Chris Sabin in the following bout. It lasted 15 minutes and 42 seconds. In this match, the four competitors fought until two were eliminated by pinfall or submission; the two remaining wrestlers then fought to escape from the cage, with the first to do so the winner. Dutt was the first wrestler eliminated after Shocker slammed him into the steel cage. After this elimination, Trinity climbed up to the top of the cage and performed a backflip off the top onto the three wrestlers below. Traci then entered the arena and forced Trinity to the backstage area. The second eliminated was Shane, after Sabin forced him back-first into the mat with his signature maneuver the Cradle Shock. Sabin and Shocker remained as they both fought to escape the cage, which Shocker did first to win the contest.

The fourth encounter was a Six Sides of Steel Tables match between Jeff Hardy and Raven, which lasted 11 minutes and 51 seconds. In a tables match, two opponents fight until one is forced through a table by the other. At one point during the contest, Hardy laid Raven on a table then ascended to the top of the cage. Hardy followed by jumping off and performing a front-flip towards Raven, who moved out of the way and caused Hardy to crash through the table. Due to not being forced through by Raven, the match continued until Hardy laid Raven on a stack of four tables. Hardy then jumped off the top of the cage onto Raven in a seated position, forcing him through all the tables and winning the encounter.

America's Most Wanted (Chris Harris and James Storm) defended the NWA World Tag Team Championship against Team Canada (Eric Young and Petey Williams), who were accompanied by A-1, in a Six Sides of Steel Strap match next. It lasted 14 minutes even. In a strap match, wrestlers are attached by a strap for the duration of the match, but they mainly used it as a weapon. AMW retained the titles after forcing Williams into the mat by performing their signature maneuver, the Death Sentence.

=== Main event matches ===
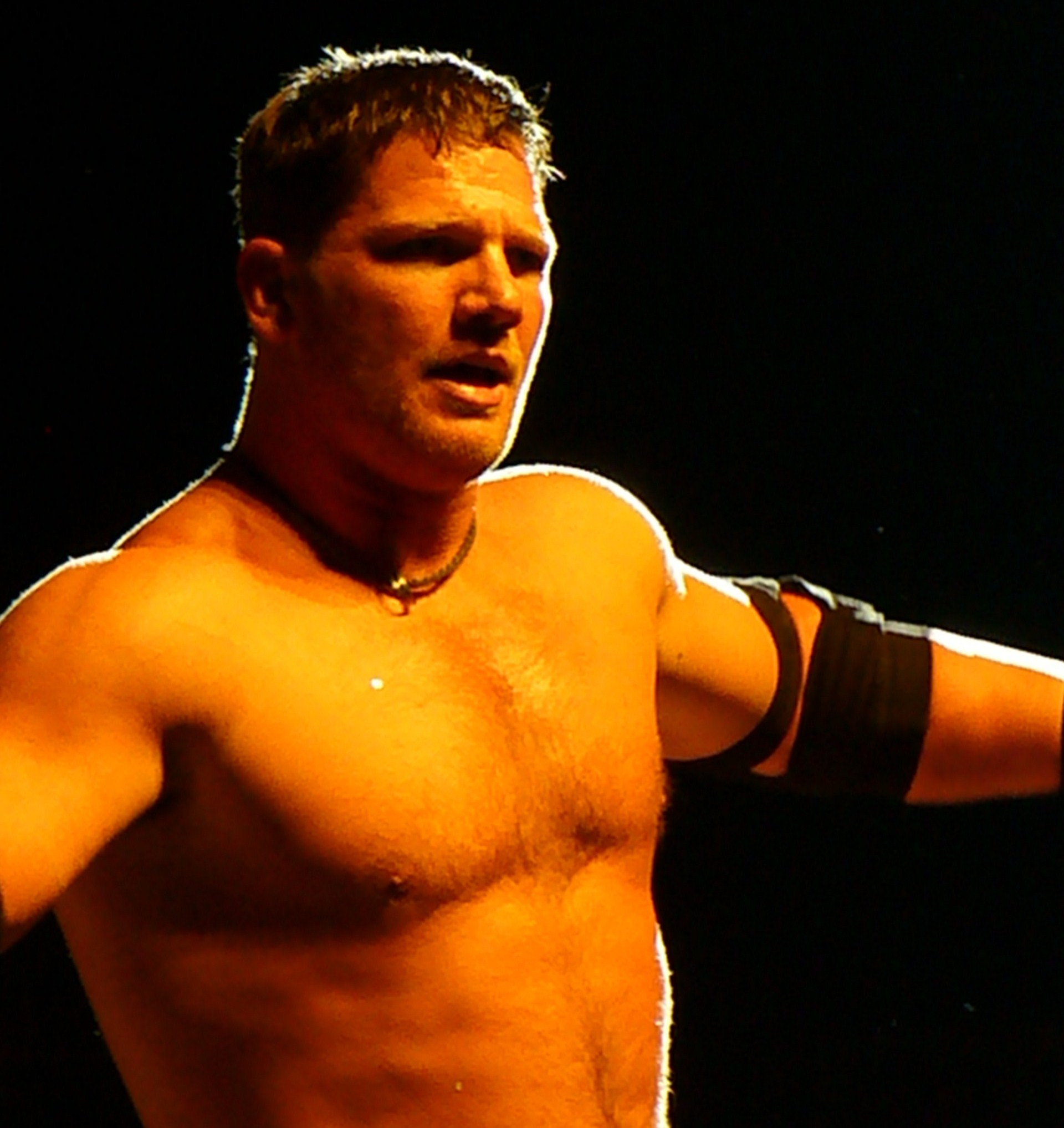
A.J. Styles defeated Abyss for a future NWA World Heavyweight Championship match at Lockdown.

The TNA X Division Championship was defended in a bout that lasted 15 minutes and 28 seconds between then-champion Christopher Daniels and Elix Skipper. During the encounter, Daniels performed his signature backflip, the Best Moonsault Ever, on Skipper, which earned him a near-fall. Skipper later jumped off the top of the cage and bashed Daniels in the back of the head with his forearm. This also gained Skipper a near-fall. Daniels went on to perform his signature maneuver, the Angel Wings, on Skipper, which forced him face-first into the mat and allowed him to gain the pinfall and to retain the title.

Team Nash (Diamond Dallas Page, Sean Waltman, and an unknown member) fought Team Jarrett (Jeff Jarrett, Monty Brown, and The Outlaw) in the first-ever three-on-three Lethal Lockdown match, which ran 15 minutes and 35 seconds. Waltman and Jarrett started the match by fighting through the crowd before entering the cage. After five minutes, The Outlaw joined the match and helped Jarrett attack Waltman. Diamond Dallas Page entered the match two minutes later and attacked Jarrett and The Outlaw with a cane. Following another two minutes, Brown joined the fray, finished out Team Jarrett, and threw Waltman into the cage wall. The final member of Team Nash was revealed after the final two minutes, as B.G. James was thrown into the mix that allowed a pinfall or submission to occur. Brown gained a near-fall for Team Jarrett on James after forcing him into a trash can with his signature maneuver, the Pounce. Eventually, Waltman performed a move called a hurricanrana on Brown, leading to the pinfall and victory.

The main event was between A.J. Styles and Abyss, in which the winner received an NWA World Heavyweight Championship match at Hard Justice. Its duration was 18 minutes even. The match began on the outside as Styles performed a front-flip onto Abyss, who was standing in the doorway of the cage. Later, as Styles was about to enter the cage, Abyss slammed the door twice into Styles, while the second door slam the second hit him in the face and caused him to crash to the floor and to bleed from the forehead. During the contest, Abyss used a steel chain as a weapon to help open up Styles' wound more. At one point, Abyss opened a bag and poured a large number of thumbtacks onto the mat, then proceeding to try to slam Styles into them. Styles countered and slammed Abyss face-first into the tacks instead with his signature maneuver, the Styles Clash. Near the end of the contest, Styles climbed the steel cage and stood on the top, but Abyss grabbed and threw the referee into the cage wall, causing Styles to fall and barely hang on. Abyss then followed by climbing the cage and by hanging Styles by the neck for a brief time with the steel chain. Then, Styles performed a sunset flip powerbomb and slammed Abyss into the tacks back-first. He followed by covering for the three count, winning of the encounter and earning his future title match.

== Reception ==
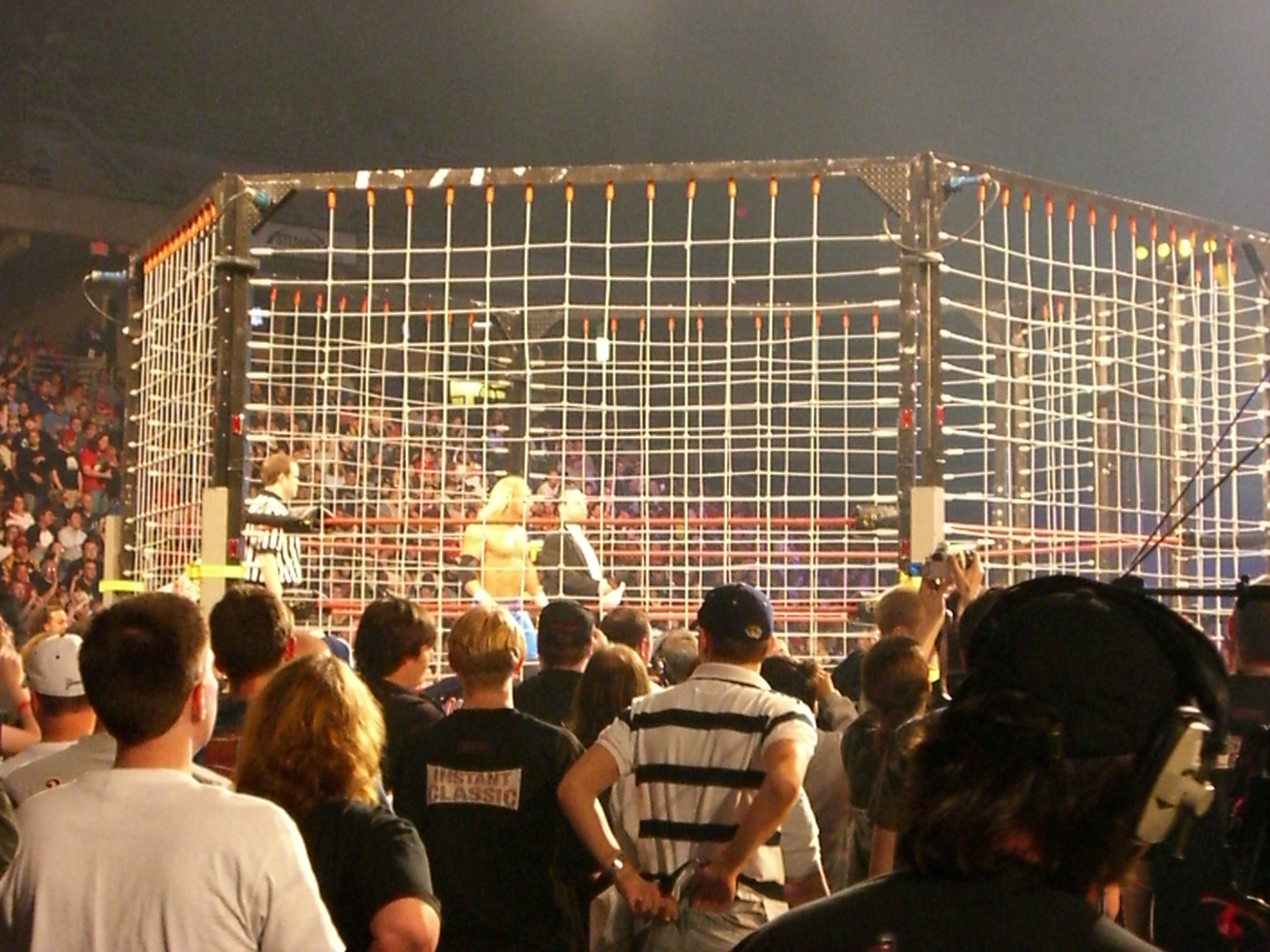
All matches contested at Lockdown were held inside the Six Sides of Steel.

A total of 775 people attended the event. Canadian Online Explorer writer Jason Clevett rated the entire event a 6 out of 10, which was lower than the 8 out of 10 given to the 2006 Lockdown event by Chris Sokol. A rating was not given to TNA's previous event Destination X, but Clevett gave a rating of 7 out of 10 in his review of TNA's Against All Odds. Compared to rival World Wrestling Entertainment's WrestleMania 21 PPV event held on April 4, Lockdown was rated lower, Dale Plummer and Nick Tylwalk gave WrestleMania a 7 out of 10. Regarding the overall event, Clevett felt the all cage match format was "too much of a good thing". He went on to state that by the end of the event he "was tired of seeing the cage", but that Styles and Abyss "quickly brought my interest back with a brutal and fun bout that ended off the show on a positive note". When speaking of the TNA X Division Championship match, Clevett wrote that he felt it "was technically a very good match", but he "expected more considering the talent involved". However, he felt that the psychological aspect was "excellent" regarding the two former Triple X partners' counters of each other's moves. Clevett gave the highest match rating of 8.5 out of 10 to the main event, while he gave the lowest rating of 2 out of 10 to the Prince of Darkness match. He gave the Lethal Lockdown match a 5 out of 10, while he gave the X Division Title match an 8 out of 10.

Wade Keller of the Pro Wrestling Torch rated the main event and the X Division Championship match 3 1/2 stars out of 5, while he rated the Lethal Lockdown match a 2 and three-fourths out of 5. He gave the lowest ranking to the Prince of Darkness match, at a fourth of a star. Keller commented on the main event as not being "bad at all, but not quite at a four-star level". He felt that if there had not been "any other cage matches or stunt bumps, it might have been four-stars-plus". Regarding the Lethal Lockdown match, Keller believed the bout "felt rushed". As for the X Division Championship defense, Keller stated that it was a "good match". When speaking on Candido's injury, Keller stated it was "absolutely brutal looking" and felt it was an "obvious full snapping of his ankle bone". 411Mania's Ronnie LaFianza rated Lockdown an overall 8 out of 10. The main event was given 4 and three-fourths stars out of 5, the Lethal Lockdown match 2 1/2 stars, and the X Division Championship defense 3 1/2 stars. LaFianza felt the event "just seemed to get better and better as it went on", but felt it was a "pretty average PPV leading up into the main event". On August 19, 2005, the event was released on DVD by TNA Home Video. A DVD boxset called "TNA Anthology: The Epic Set", including Lockdown, TNA's November 2004 Victory Road PPV event, and the 2004 Turning Point event was also released on September 20, 2005. TNA released a DVD counting down the top 50 moments in their history in 2007, and Lockdown was the first all steel cage PPV listed at number 23.

== Aftermath ==
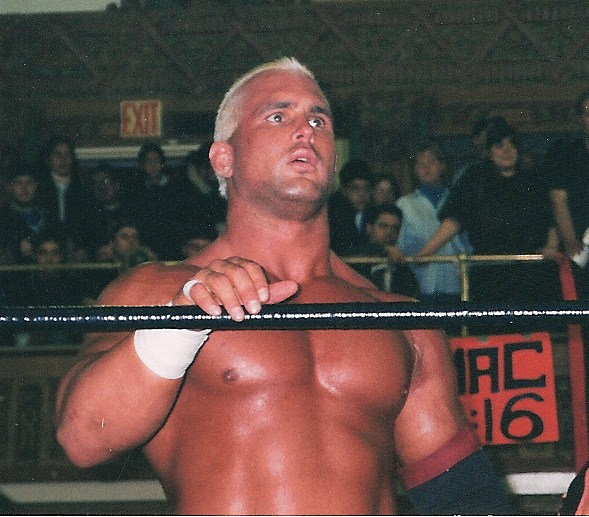
Chris Candido suffered an injury at Lockdown that eventually led to his death.

After Lockdown on the April 29 episode of Impact!, DOA Dusty Rhodes announced that A.J. Styles would face Jeff Jarrett for the NWA World Heavyweight Championship at Hard Justice with Tito Ortiz as the Special Guest Referee. Styles went on to Hard Justice to defeat Jarrett and win the championship. Styles held the title until TNA's Slammiversary PPV event on June 19, where he lost the title in a five-man King of the Mountain match to Raven, which also involved Abyss, Sean Waltman, and Monty Brown. Raven continued his feud with Jeff Hardy following Lockdown. On the May 13 episode of Impact!, it was announced that Raven would face Hardy in a Clockwork Orange House of Fun match at Hard Justice. Hardy ended up not appearing at the event; Raven instead faced and defeated Waltman in the encounter. Raven then replaced Jarrett in the King of the Mountain match at Slammiversary, where he won the NWA World Heavyweight Championship.

TNA held a Twenty-Man Gauntlet for the Gold at Hard Justice to determine the number one contender to the NWA World Heavyweight Championship. The match was announced on the April 29 episode of Impact!. Abyss, Bobby Roode, Zach Gowen, Eric Young, Cassidy Riley, Elix Skipper, Shark Boy, A-1, Chris Sabin, Petey Williams, Sonny Siaki, Lance Hoyt, Michael Shane, Jerrelle Clarke, Mikey Batts, The Outlaw, Trytan, Ron Killings, Apolo, and B.G. James all participated in the bout. Abyss pinned Killings to win the contest.

Following Lockdown, Shocker was named number one contender to the TNA X Division Championship. On the April 29 episode of Impact!, Christopher Daniels' defense of the TNA X Division Championship against Shocker was promoted for Hard Justice. Shocker failed to win the championship at the event. America's Most Wanted lost the NWA World Tag Team Championship on the April 29 episode of Impact! to The Naturals, who were aided by Chris Candido. On the May 6 episode of Impact! it was announced The Naturals would defend the tag team championship against AMW at Hard Justice. The Naturals retained the titles over AMW at the PPV event.

Due to the legal issues with WWE, all TNA DVD releases featuring footage of Kip James as "The Outlaw" or "The New Age Outlaw" had the on-screen graphics blurred, the name silenced out of the audio, and match commentary completely replaced to reflect a retroactive name change to "Kip James". The change begins during a backstage announcement by DOA Dusty Rhodes.

=== Death of Chris Candido ===
Besides Chris Candido suffering a leg injury during his tag team match, Abyss also suffered a dislocated shoulder during the main event against A.J. Styles. Abyss' injury was taken care of backstage after the event, but Candido was diagnosed with a dislocated ankle, broken tibia, and a broken fibula that required surgery. Candido had an operation on April 25 to have a plate, screws, and pins placed in his ankle to fix the problem. Candido was reported to be sidelined for 2 to 3 months. According to reports, Candido suffered the injury from taking a dropkick by Sonny Siaki and landing on his leg improperly. After the surgery, he hoped to be recovered in 6 to 8 weeks. On April 28, Candido was rushed to the hospital after he collapsed where he died a short time later. Cause of death was released by his brother Johnny afterwards as a blood clot due to the surgery a few days prior. TNA released a public statement on April 29 regarding the subject. TNA paid tribute to Candido on the April 29 episode of Impact! as well as at TNA's Hard Justice PPV event. The April 29 episode of Impact! opened and ended with a memorial to Candido. At Hard Justice, a ten-bell salute was held while a photo of Candido, a pair of boots, and one-half of the NWA World Tag Team Championship positioned on a steel chair sat in the center of the ring. In TNA's 50 Greatest Moments DVD, Candido's aiding The Naturals to win the NWA World Tag Team Championship was listed as number 10. A portion of the Lockdown DVD sale profits were donated by TNA to the Chris Candido Memorial Fund. TNA originally planned to remove Candido's match from the DVD, but were given the blessing of his family to include it on the publication. A tribute to Candido was included on the DVD by TNA.

== Results ==
No.	Results	Stipulations	Times
1^{P}	3Live Kru (Konnan and Ron Killings) defeated David Young and Lex Lovett and The Naturals (Andy Douglas and Chase Stevens) (with Chris Candido)	Three-way tag team match	6:34
2	Apolo and Sonny Siaki defeated Chris Candido and Lance Hoyt	Six Sides of Steel Cage match	6:58
3	Dustin Rhodes defeated Bobby Roode (with A-1 and Coach D'Amore) 2-1	Prince of Darkness match	15:20
4	Shocker defeated Chris Sabin, Matt Bentley (with Trinity), and Sonjay Dutt^{1}	Four-man Xscape match for an TNA X Division Championship match at Hard Justice	16:14
5	Jeff Hardy defeated Raven	Six Sides of Steel Tables match	11:51
6	America's Most Wanted (Chris Harris and James Storm) (c) defeated Team Canada (Eric Young and Petey Williams) (with A-1)	Six Sides of Steel Strap match for the NWA World Tag Team Championship	14:00
7	Christopher Daniels (c) defeated Elix Skipper	Six Sides of Steel Cage match for the TNA X Division Championship	15:28
8	Team Nash (B.G. James, Diamond Dallas Page and Sean Waltman) defeated Team Jarrett (Jeff Jarrett, Monty Brown and The Outlaw)^{2}	Lethal Lockdown match	15:35
9	A.J. Styles defeated Abyss	Six Sides of Steel match for a NWA World Heavyweight Championship match at Hard Justice	18:00
(c) / – the champion(s) heading into the match; P / – the match was broadcast on the pre-show

1. Xscape match

Elimination No.	Eliminated	Eliminator	Notes	Time
1	Sonjay Dutt	Shocker	Pinfall after being slammed into the cage wall.	10:45
2	Michael Shane	Chris Sabin	Pinfall after a Cradle Shock	14:03
Loser	Chris Sabin	N/A	Sabin failed to escape the cage and touch the floor before Shocker.	15:20
WINNER	Shocker	N/A	Shocker escaped the cage and touched the floor before Sabin.	15:20

2. Lethal Lockdown entrances

Entrance	Wrestler	Team	Time
1	Sean Waltman	Team Nash	0:00
2	Jeff Jarrett	Team Jarrett	0:00
3	The Outlaw	Team Jarrett	5:00
4	Diamond Dallas Page	Team Nash	7:00
5	Monty Brown	Team Jarrett	9:00
6	B.G. James	Team Nash	11:00
