= Big Tilly =

American professional wrestler

Personal information
- Born: James Tilquist; September 4 New Jersey

Professional wrestling career
- Ring name(s): Big Rocco; Big Tilly; Blue Tilly
- Billed height: 6 ft 0 in (1.83 m)
- Billed weight: 400 lb (180 kg)
- Billed from: Fraternity Row, College Town

James Tilquist is an American professional wrestler better known by the ring name Big Tilly. He is best known for being a member of the tag team Phi Delta Slam as well as his appearances in Total Nonstop Action Wrestling. In early 2009 he returned to TNA under ring name Big Rocco as one half of The Main Event Mafia's (and later Mick Foley's) personal security force.

== Professional wrestling career ==
Tilly worked for World Championship Wrestling throughout the mid-1990s as a jobber. He later began wrestling primarily on the Floridian independent circuit, where he formed a tag team with Bruno Sassi known as Phi Delta Slam. Phi Delta Slam used the gimmick of a pair of boisterous fraternity members.

=== Total Nonstop Action Wrestling (2005, 2007, 2009–2010) ===
Phi Delta Slam were introduced to Total Nonstop Action Wrestling (TNA) after Dusty Rhodes told his two competing assistants, Traci Brooks and Trinity, to each find a tag team. The tag teams would wrestle one another at Destination X, with the winning tag team's sponsor becoming Rhodes' sole assistant. Trinity selected Phi Delta Slam, and they debuted in February 2005, wrestling dark matches. They made their on-screen debut on March 13 at Destination X, where they lost to Traci's choice, The Harris Brothers. Phi Delta Slam remained in TNA for several weeks afterwards, but were unable to get over with fans, and began appearing only sporadically with the promotion. In September 2005, their profiles were removed from the TNA website, confirming that the team was gone from TNA.

Tilly and Sassi later made a cameo appearance in a series of comedy segments on the December 20, 2007 episode of Impact! where they were seen at Eric Young's Christmas party, which also involved the likes of Luke Williams, Kevin Nash, ODB, and Awesome Kong.

==== Return ====
In early 2009, both Tilly and Sassi returned to TNA as the personal security of The Main Event Mafia in order to help them fend off The TNA Front Line. In order play into the mafia aspect of the stable, Tilly was renamed to Rocco (before it was later tweaked to Big Rocco), he began wearing sunglasses at all times, he dyed his normally brown hair to black and began sporting a goatee. On the March 13 edition of Impact!, Sal and Kurt Angle accompanied Rocco as he wrestled Front Line member Eric Young in the main event, which he lost after Young pinned him following a Death Valley driver. On the April 2 edition of Impact!, Rocco and Sal challenged and lost to Team 3D. On the May 7 edition of Impact! they were defeated in a handicap match by Matt Morgan. On the May 28 edition of Impact! Sting, the new leader of the Main Event Mafia, fired Rocco and Sal. On the June 4, 2009, edition of Impact! Rocco and Sal were hired by Mick Foley. The two of them have since made only sporadic appearances as security men.

On August 8, 2010, at ECW reunion show, Hardcore Justice, Tilquist portrayed a fake version of The Blue Meanie, using the name Blue Tilly, and, along with Hollywood Nova, accompanied Stevie Richards to the ring. Later in the night Tilly and Nova attacked Tommy Dreamer during his match with Raven.

=== Independent circuit ===
Phi Delta Slam is currently wrestling with the South Florida based Coastal Championship Wrestling. In addition, all three members of Phi Delta Slam (Sassi, Tilly and Evans) operate a professional wrestling school called "Bodyslam University" in Fort Lauderdale, Florida.

== Championships and accomplishments ==
- Coastal Championship Wrestling
  - CCW Tag Team Championship (1 time) – with Bruno Sassi
- Florida Wrestling Alliance
  - FWA Tag Team Championship (4 times) – with Bruno Sassi
- Independent Pro Wrestling Association
  - IPWA Tag Team Championship (5 times) – with Bruno Sassi
- International Wrestling Federation
  - IWF Tag Team Championship (4 times) – with Bruno Sassi
- South Eastern Championship Wrestling
  - SECW Tag Team Championship (1 time) – with Bruno Sassi
- World Wide Wrestling
  - WWW Tag Team Championship (2 times) – with Bruno Sassi

== See also ==
- Bruno Sassi
