= 3 Live Kru =

Professional wrestling stable

Stable
- Name(s): 2 Live Kru; 3 Live Kru; 4 Live Kru
- Former member(s): Ron Killings; Konnan; B.G. James; Kip James
- Debut: July 2003
- Disbanded: December 11, 2005

The 3 Live Kru (3LK) was a professional wrestling stable in Total Nonstop Action Wrestling (TNA). It debuted in July 2003, and was initially a trio consisting of Ron Killings, Konnan and B.G. James. Each member exemplified an ethnic stereotype, and rapped as they approached the ring in camouflage clothing.

The White Southerner James was dubbed "The Trailer Park Gangsta" or "B-Jizzle". The African American Killings, already known as "The Truth", was dubbed "The Suntan Superman". The Latino Konnan was dubbed "The Magic Stick", his New World Order (nWo) nickname "K-Dogg", or sometimes "K-Dizzle."

In November 2005, they aligned with Kip James, and began referring to themselves as the 4 Live Kru (4LK) before disbanding soon after.

== History ==
=== Pre-TNA ===
In the World Wrestling Federation in late 2000, Degeneration X finally came to an end following a short feud between Road Dogg (B.G. James) and X-Pac. Afterwards, James was paired with the debuting K-Kwik (Ron Killings) in a short lived hip hop-themed tag team. This was the first instance of James & Killings teaming before the two reunited years later in TNA. James was released in December, and Killings shortly thereafter.

=== Debut ===
3LK began as an on-screen entity on June 18, 2003. In the preceding weeks, Konnan, James and Killings appeared together on the pay-per-views in varying combinations, but June 18 was the first time all three appeared together. At first, they did spots where the three of them were made fun of other Total Nonstop Action Wrestling wrestlers and, occasionally, each other. They also began wrestling together as a three-man tandem in dark matches and on TNA Xplosion. Starting on July 16 of that year, they began with a series of vignettes where they all went to the settings of their individual stereotypes. In the first one, the three went to the ghetto, where B.G. ended up dressed like a pimp. In the second one, they all went to a Mexican restaurant, where The Truth ordered orange juice and instead got tequila, proceeding to get drunk. In the third one, they all went to B.G.'s "home" in a trailer park, where The Truth was lusted over by a Deliverance-inspired redneck. It was during these vignettes that the term "3 Live Kru" was born.

=== Titles ===
3LK is one of the most recognized stables in TNA, and at some points has been its most powerful stable. Killings and James got a shot at the NWA World Tag Team Championship by winning a four-team/eight-man Gauntlet Match on November 12. On November 19 they faced Simon and Swinger, the team of Simon Diamond and Johnny Swinger. The match ended with the titles held up after Killings and Swinger double-pinned each other. On November 26, the entire 3LK faced Diamond, Swinger and Glenn Gilberti in a six-man tag team match for the titles. 3LK ultimately won the match thanks to revenge interference by America's Most Wanted, and became the first team to win the Tag Team titles in a six-man tag team match. 3LK defended the titles using the Freebird Rule, just as Triple X did earlier in the year. They beat AMW in their first title defense on December 10. They were ultimately defeated for the titles by Red Shirt Security, Kevin Northcutt and Joe Legend, on January 28, 2004.

As part of the rap persona, they recorded two songs together. On September 24, 2003, they performed 3 Live K on a TNA pay-per-view. They performed a new song, Beware (The Remix), on January 7, 2004. Both have since been used at different times as their entrance music.

3LK continue to make an impact in TNA throughout 2004, with The Truth eventually returning to singles action and going after the NWA World Heavyweight Championship. He won the title in a four-way match on May 19, 2004, over champion A.J. Styles, Chris Harris and Raven. He would lose the title two weeks later to Jeff Jarrett in the first King of the Mountain match on June 2. Over the next few months, 3LK would feud directly with Jeff Jarrett and his hired guns, the Elite Guard (Shawn Hernandez, Chad Collyer and Onyx, assembled by Jarrett specifically to foil the ethnic diversity of 3LK). Their first match in Orlando, Florida on TNA Impact! was a six-man tag match against David Young and The Naturals, Andy Douglas and Chase Stevens, on June 11.

3LK would finally come across the Tag Team titles once more at Victory Road on November 7, when B.G. James and Konnan defeated Bobby Roode and Eric Young of Team Canada. They would lose the titles back to Roode and Young at Turning Point on December 5.

The Kru would begin 2005 with a feud with Shazarian, Michael Shane and Frankie Kazarian, which embroiled TNA Impact! analyst Jeff Hammond. B.G. James and Jeff Hammond would beat Shazarian in a tag-team match at Against All Odds on February 13, a humiliation which would help precipitate Shazarian's ultimate breakup.

=== Kip James ===
The group suffered some turmoil during 2005. Soon after Billy Gunn signed with TNA initially as "The Outlaw", he started targeting B.G., his former tag-team partner in the WWF, and began a campaign of sabotage against the 3LK. This first led to The Outlaw and B.G. James being on opposite sides of the Lethal Lockdown at Lockdown on April 24, with The Outlaw on Jeff Jarrett's team, and B.G. on the team of Diamond Dallas Page as their "mystery partner" to replace an injured Kevin Nash. The two avoided confronting each other, but Page's team won the match ultimately.

The next month, B.G. James asked Diamond Dallas Page to tag with him against their respective foes, The Outlaw and Monty Brown at Hard Justice on May 15. B.G. however continued his unwillingness to come to blows with The Outlaw as "travel problems" led to him not arriving in time for the match. The Truth took his place, but he and Page lost the match when Page was Pounced by Brown.

By this time, Konnan was beginning to distrust B.G. to the point of not even recognizing him as a member of 3LK. Ron Killings, however, still trusted B.G. At Slammiversary on June 19, B.G. James promised his 3LK teammates that he would prove his loyalties. After The Truth's solo match with The Outlaw, which Killings won, The Outlaw tried to hit Truth with a steel chair. B.G. took the chair from The Outlaw, but refused to strike his former tag-team partner once more. Konnan ultimately ran The Outlaw off. Later, Konnan and B.G. James took on America's Most Wanted. They lost when Konnan was distracted by The Outlaw, causing B.G. James to not be able to tag out and get pinned after a Hart Attack. B.G. James was upset that Konnan had let The Outlaw get to him so badly, and left the Impact! Zone alone.

B.G. James stopped appearing alongside Konnan and The Truth for the next few months. However, he also refused The Outlaw's advances, despite Outlaw's changing his name to Kip James in brotherhood with B.G. at No Surrender 2005 on July 17. Kip James and Monty Brown beat Konnan and The Truth there, and B.G. finally appeared at the end of the match. Kip James gave B.G. an opportunity to join with him by hitting The Truth with a chair, but he refused to do it. The Truth saw that as hope that B.G. could be talked back into the Kru, but Konnan had long since given up, calling himself and Killings the "2Live Kru".

At Sacrifice on August 14, Truth and Konnan faced Kip James and The Alpha Male once more. On the July 29, 2005, episode of TNA Impact!, TNA Director of Authority Larry Zbyszko, citing fear from the referee team in the face of Kip and Monty's intentional targeting of them, named B.G. James the special guest referee for the match. B.G. proved his allegiance to 3LK after two months of silence, making his decision loud and clear when he stopped Kip from using a steel chair, then attacked Kip himself. Konnan got the pin, and 3 Live Kru reunited and celebrated together after the match.

=== Return ===
In the 2005 Chris Candido Memorial Tag Team Tournament where tag teams are formed by pairing a veteran wrestler with a rookie, a quarterfinal match pitted B.G. James with Cassidy Riley against Ron Killings and Sonjay Dutt on the August 19, 2005, episode of TNA Impact! Eventually B.G and The Truth ended up facing each other in the ring, but they refused to fight, drawing the ire of their respective partners. Ultimately B.G. hit Cassidy with the Pumphandle Drop after Cassidy, an admirer of Raven, used one of Raven's moves on The Truth. This allowed Sonjay to hit the Hindu Press and get the pin for the victory, advancing with The Truth to the semifinals. B.G. did not seem too upset to lose the match, and celebrated with Ron and Sonjay. Konnan also participated in the tournament, teamed with Lance Hoyt, but both remaining 3LK teams were eliminated in the semifinals. The full tandem won a match against The Diamonds in the Rough at Unbreakable on September 11.

In the weeks before Bound for Glory, Kip James again came to the rescue of B.G. James in situations with Team Canada, suffering the ire of Konnan in the process. He offered his protection (to neutralize D'Amore in particular, in his own words) to the group at BFG, but Konnan thought it was a bad idea. 3LK lost their match with Team Canada, but Kip James made the save when Team Canada beat down 3LK after the match. Team Canada held Konnan, expecting Kip to hit him with a steel chair. Instead, Kip proceeded to lay out members of Team Canada, saving Konnan instead. Later that night, after being eliminated from the 10-man Gauntlet Match to determine Jeff Jarrett's opponent for the NWA World Heavyweight Championship, Kip would save The Truth from elimination twice before being restrained by the referees.

3LK came to the rescue of Rhino after he beat Jarrett for the title at the end of Bound for Glory. Kip James refereed a Hockey Stick Fight between 3LK and Team Canada at Genesis on November 13 and called the match fairly. 3LK won the match.

=== 4 Live Kru ===
On the November 26 episode of Impact!, B.G. brought Kip and the 3LK to the ring, and asked the Truth and Konnan to give Kip James a yes/no vote to be accepted into the group. After B.G. got heated with Konnan, both gave Kip "yes" votes, and the "4 Live Kru" was born. That night, Kip James had a fight with NWA World Heavyweight Champion Jeff Jarrett, and almost won before the usual interference tipped the match in Jarrett's favor.

On December 3, 4LK gave an interview to Terry Taylor along with BG's father, "Bullet" Bob Armstrong. Armstrong opined that 4LK were the chosen ones, and that if they stuck together they could rule TNA.

On December 11 at Turning Point 2005, Konnan hit Kip James with a steel chair at the end of their match with Team Canada. He also hit B.G. with the same chair. He offered his companionship to The Truth, but Killings was upset, yelling at Konnan to hit him as well, thus ending the team.

== Championships and accomplishments ==
- Total Nonstop Action Wrestling
  - NWA World Heavyweight Championship (1 time) – Killings
  - NWA World Tag Team Championship (2 times)
  - Gauntlet for the Gold (2003 – Tag Team) – James and Killings

== See also ==
- The Filthy Animals
- The New Age Outlaws
- Team Pacman
