= Michael Shane and Kazarian =

Professional wrestling tag team

Tag team
- Members: Kazarian; Michael Shane
- Name(s): Maverick Matt and Kazarian; Michael Shane and Kazarian; Shazarian; Serotonin
- Billed heights: 6 ft 1 in (1.85 m) - Kazarian; 6 ft 0 in (1.83 m) - Shane
- Combined billed weight: 436 lb (198 kg)
- Debut: 2004
- Disbanded: 2007

Michael Shane and Kazarian were a professional wrestling tag team in Total Nonstop Action Wrestling formed by Matt Bentley (then known as "Michael Shane") and Frankie Kazarian (usually known just by his last name, "Kazarian"), and managed by Traci Brooks.

Although the two were largely a failure in the tag team circuit, they did have the distinction of becoming the first two wrestlers to achieve a tie in an Ultimate X match, thus both holding the TNA X Division Championship at the same time.

== History ==
=== X Division ===
The team formed in June 2004 as part of a plot by several villainous X Division wrestlers to kick A.J. Styles out of the X Division after coming back from being a two-time NWA World Heavyweight Champion. Shane and Kazarian made the claim that it was illegal under TNA rules to win the X Division Title if a wrestler had previously won the NWA World Title (if so, the rule has since been stricken because numerous wrestlers, including Styles, Ron Killings and Sabu, have competed in X Division Championship matches after previously being an NWA World Heavyweight Champion).

Shane and Kazarian instigated an Ultimate X match, Ultimate X4, with Styles on the July 28, 2004, weekly pay-per-view. After interference by Kid Kash and his Heavyweight enforcer Dallas, both Shane and Kazarian took the title and fell to the mat at the same time. They were declared co-winners and co-champions, and would go on to defend the belt jointly.

Three weeks later, at the August 11 pay-per-view, the X Division Title was contested in a Gauntlet for the Gold. As per the rules, one co-champion would start the match, while the other would get the final spot in the match. Kazarian was the first entrant, but remained in until the final three. He was ultimately eliminated by the Amazing Red, who was then defeated by "The Canadian Destroyer" Petey Williams who won the belt.

=== Tag team ===
Following their loss of the X Division Title, the two remained together and focused on the tag team division, feuding most memorably with 3Live Kru.

At Against All Odds on February 13, 2005, they faced B.G. James and Fox Sports NASCAR commentator Jeff Hammond in a tag team match. In that match, Shane accidentally superkicked Kazarian, causing them to lose the match.

The duo seemed poised to earn a title shot for the NWA World Tag Team Championship in early 2005, but their run as a team was cut short when the team disbanded. Kazarian disappeared after a match with the same result the next week on TNA Impact!, having accepted a developmental contract with World Wrestling Entertainment. His TNA contract lapsed in September 2004, but he continued to appear on a per-show basis and left on good terms.

=== Split ===
With the team disbanded, Shane returned to the X Division. In the Spring of 2005 he feuded with Traci, even using her archrival Trinity as a valet for a time. After Hard Justice on May 15, when Traci turned on new partner Chris Sabin after he supposedly hit on Trinity, Shane and Traci reunited. That summer, due to a lawsuit, Shane began wrestling under the name Matt Bentley, his real name. Prior to the Spike TV move, Bentley teamed frequently with Alex Shelley, although he has focused more on singles action since the jump, and had even turned into a fan favorite after spending most of his career to that point as a villain.

Kazarian debuted on WWE Velocity on July 14, 2005. Despite going undefeated, however, Kazarian quit WWE on August 13.

=== Reformation and Serotonin ===
Kazarian returned to TNA at Victory Road on July 16, 2006. Bentley (now known as "Maverick" Matt) and Kazarian reunited as a tag team on the July 20 episode of TNA Impact!.

Over the course of October and November 2006, Bentley and Kazarian began displaying new gothic looks, with Bentley appearing with bright red hair at Raven's "perch" in the Impact! Zone, while Kazarian (with green hair and a grunge attire) appeared out of nowhere, attacking Rhino during one of his matches with Christian Cage. It was later revealed that Bentley and Kazarian had joined Raven's new flock, called Serotonin, along with Johnny Devine.

On August 15, 2007, Matt Bentley was released from his TNA contract. After a single appearance on WWE in 2008, Bentley left wrestling and formed a rock band that is based in Orlando. Frankie Kazarian currently wrestles on AEW as Frankie Kazarian.

== Championships and accomplishments ==
- Total Nonstop Action Wrestling
  - TNA X Division Championship (1 time, co-holders)
