= Phi Delta Slam =

Professional wrestling tag team

Tag team
- Name(s): Phi Delta Slam; Main Event Mafia Security; Mick Foley's Security; Rocco and Sally Boy
- Members: Big Tilly; Bruno Sassi
- Billed from: Fraternity Row, College Town
- Former members: Dan Evans; Trinity (manager)
- Debut: 1994

Phi Delta Slam (ΦΔS) is a professional wrestling tag team, consisting of Big Tilly and Bruno Sassi. They wrestle principally on the Floridian independent circuit.

== History ==
When Sassi began wrestling on the Floridian independent circuit, he formed a tag team with "Brother" Dan Evans. Evans and Sassi used the gimmick of a pair of boisterous, prank playing fraternity members. After Evans retired for several years, Sassi continued to use the gimmick, and eventually found a new tag team partner, Big Tilly. Sassi and Tilly then became known collectively as "Phi Delta Slam".

Phi Delta Slam made their debut in ECW on June 26, 1994. Their first match was on ECW Hardcore TV episode #64 on July 5, 1994 against ECW Tag Team Champions Public Enemy. They appeared in the now-defunct Future of Wrestling promotion in 2001 and remained there until the promotion folded in 2002. They were rejoined by Evans, expanding Phi Delta Slam to a stable. Phi Delta Slam appeared with the South Florida based Coastal Championship Wrestling promotion throughout 2004.

=== Total Nonstop Action Wrestling (2005–2007, 2009, 2010) ===
In 2005, Phi Delta Slam were signed by Total Nonstop Action Wrestling. Phi Delta Slam were introduced to TNA after Dusty Rhodes told his two competing assistants, Traci Brooks and Trinity, to each find a tag team. The tag teams would wrestle one another at Destination X, with the winning tag team's sponsor becoming Rhodes' sole assistant. Trinity selected Phi Delta Slam, and they debuted in February 2005, wrestling dark matches, and made their onscreen debut on March 13 at Destination X, where they lost to Traci's choice, The Harris Brothers. Phi Delta Slam remained in TNA for several weeks afterwards, but were unable to get over with fans, and began appearing only sporadically with the promotion. In September 2005, their profiles were removed from the TNA website, confirming that the team was gone from TNA.

Tilly and Sassi later made a cameo appearance in a series of comedy segments on the December 20, 2007 episode of Impact! where they were seen at Eric Young's Christmas party, which also involved the likes of Bushwhacker Butch, Kevin Nash, ODB, and Awesome Kong.

In early 2009, both Tilly and Sassi returned to TNA as the personal security of The Main Event Mafia in order to help them fend off the TNA Frontline. In order play into the mafia aspect of the stable, both were renamed to Rocco and Sal respectively, both began wearing sunglasses at all times and Sassi dyed his normally blond hair to black and began sporting a beard. On the March 13 edition of Impact!, Sal and Kurt Angle accompanied Rocco as he wrestled Frontline member Eric Young in the main event, which Rocco lost after Young pinned him following a Death Valley driver. On the April 2 edition of Impact! they were defeated in a tag team match by Team 3D. On the May 7 edition of Impact! they were defeated in a handicap match by Matt Morgan. On the May 28 edition of Impact! Sting, the new leader of the Main Event Mafia, fired Rocco and Sal. On the June 4, 2009, edition of Impact! Rocco and Sal were hired by Mick Foley, thus turning face. They wrestled their first title match on the July 23 edition of impact, losing to TNA World Tag Team Champions Scott Steiner and Booker T. The two of them have since made only sporadic appearances as security men.

== Championships and accomplishments ==
- American Wrestling Federation (Puerto Rico)

- AWF Tag Team Championship (1 time)

- Coastal Championship Wrestling

- CCW Tag Team Championship (1 time)

- Florida Wrestling Alliance

- FWA Tag Team Championship (4 times)

- Independent Pro Wrestling Association

- IPWA Tag Team Championship (5 times)

- International Wrestling Federation

- IWF Tag Team Championship (4 times)

- South Eastern Championship Wrestling

- SECW Tag Team Championship (1 time)

- World Wide Wrestling

- WWW Tag Team Championship (2 times)
