= Bruno Sassi =

American professional wrestler (born 1970)

Personal information
- Born: December 15, 1970 (age 55) Baltimore, Maryland

Professional wrestling career
- Ring name(s): Bruno Sassi; Big Bruno; Sal; Sally Boy; Billy Brooks
- Billed height: 6 ft 0 in (1.83 m)
- Billed weight: 280 lb (130 kg)
- Billed from: Fraternity Row, College Town
- Debut: September 30, 1988
- Retired: 2014

Bruno Sassi (born December 15, 1970) is an American professional wrestler best known for being a member of the tag team Phi Delta Slam, as well as his appearances in Total Nonstop Action Wrestling. In early 2009 he returned to TNA under the ring name Sally Boy, or simply Sal, as one half of The Main Event Mafia's, and later Mick Foley's, personal security force.

== Career ==
Sassi graduated from Miramar High School in 1988, and turned down academic scholarships in order to train as a wrestler, financing his training through a series of odd jobs, including waiting tables in Hollywood Florida at Napoli's Italian restaurant, formerly run by his father-in-law Paul. Sassi made his wrestling debut on September 30, 1988. In 1990, Sassi appeared with the Nashville-based NWA Worldwide Wrestling.

Sassi eventually began wrestling primarily on the Floridian independent circuit, where he formed a tag team with "Brother" Dan Evans. Evans and Sassi used the gimmick of a pair of boisterous, prank playing fraternity members. After Evans retired due to injury, Sassi continued to use the gimmick with the third part of the team, Big Tilly. Sassi and Tilly were known collectively as Phi Delta Slam.

=== World Wrestling Federation ===
Sassi also had several matches with World Wrestling Federation from 1994 to 2000. His final and most notable match for the WWF occurred on April 15, 2000 when he lost to Stevie Richards on an episode of Jakked.

=== Total Nonstop Action Wrestling (2005, 2007, 2009–2010) ===
Phi Delta Slam were introduced to Total Nonstop Action Wrestling (TNA) after Dusty Rhodes told his two competing assistants, Traci Brooks and Trinity, to each find a tag team. The tag teams would wrestle one another at Destination X, with the winning tag team's sponsor becoming Rhodes' sole assistant. Trinity selected Phi Delta Slam, and they debuted in February 2005, wrestling dark matches. They made their on-screen debut on March 13 at Destination X, where they lost to Traci's choice, The Harris Brothers. Phi Delta Slam remained in TNA for several weeks afterwards.

Tilly and Sassi later made a cameo appearance in a series of comedy segments on the December 20, 2007 episode of Impact! where they were seen at Eric Young's Christmas party, which also involved the likes of Bushwhacker Butch, Kevin Nash, ODB, and Awesome Kong.

==== Return ====
In early 2009, both Tilly and Sassi returned to TNA as the personal security of The Main Event Mafia in order to help them fend off The TNA Front Line. In order play into the mafia aspect of the stable, Sassi was renamed to Sal (it was later tweaked to Sally Boy), he began wearing sunglasses at all times, dyed his normally blond hair to black and began sporting a short beard. On the March 13 edition of Impact!, Sal and Kurt Angle accompanied Rocco as he wrestled Frontline member Eric Young in the main event, which Rocco lost after Young pinned him following a Death Valley driver. On the April 2 edition of Impact!, Rocco and Sal challenged and lost to Team 3D. On the May 7 edition of Impact! they were defeated in a handicap match by Matt Morgan. On the May 28 edition of Impact! Sting, the new leader of the Main Event Mafia, fired Sal and Rocco. On the June 4, 2009, edition of Impact! Rocco and Sal were hired by Mick Foley. The two of them have since made sporadic appearances as bodyguards.

=== Independent circuit ===
Phi Delta Slam is currently wrestling with the South Florida-based Coastal Championship Wrestling. In addition, all three members of Phi Delta Slam (Sassi, Tilly and Evans) operate a professional wrestling school called Bodyslam University in Fort Lauderdale, Florida. Notable graduates include former WWE United States and WWE Tag Team Champion Montel Vontavious Porter.

== Championships and accomplishment ==
- Americas Wrestling Federation (Puerto Rico)
  - AWF World Tag Team Championship (1 time) - Brett Blair
- Coastal Championship Wrestling
  - CCW Heavyweight Championship (1 time)
  - CCW Tag Team Championship (3 times) – with Big Tilly and Blackheart
- Future of Wrestling
  - FOW Heavyweight Championship (1 time)
  - FOW International Heavyweight Championship (1 time)
- Florida Wrestling Alliance
  - FWA Heavyweight Championship (1 time)
  - FWA Light Heavyweight Championship (1 time)
  - FWA Tag Team Championship (4 times) – with Big Tilly
- Independent Pro Wrestling Association
  - IPWA Light Heavyweight Championship (1 time)
  - IPWA Tag Team Championship (5 times) – with Big Tilly
- International Wrestling Federation
  - IWF Tag Team Championship (4 times) – with Brett Blair
- South Eastern Championship Wrestling
  - SECW Tag Team Championship (1 time) – with Big Tilly
- World Wide Wrestling
  - WWW Tag Team Championship (2 times) – with Big Tilly
