= World Elite =

Professional wrestling stable

Stable
- Members: Eric Young (Canada; leader); Doug Williams (United Kingdom); Brutus Magnus (United Kingdom); Kiyoshi (Japan); Homicide (Puerto Rico); Sheik Abdul Bashir (Iran); Rob Terry (United Kingdom); Kevin Nash (United States)
- Name: World Elite
- Debut: July 23, 2009
- Disbanded: February 2010

The World Elite was a villainous professional wrestling alliance in the American promotion Total Nonstop Action Wrestling (TNA). The group consisted of multicultural wrestlers, representing various countries around the world. Created by Canadian wrestler Eric Young, the group had a mainly anti-American stance.

== History ==
=== Formation ===
The first seeds for World Elite were planted in March 2009, when Japanese wrestlers Kiyoshi and No Limit (Naito and Yujiro) aligned themselves with Sheik Abdul Bashir, forming an (unnamed) Anti-American faction. No Limit later left the company. In May, The British Invasion attacked Team 3D during an interview, much to the pleasure of Bashir and Kiyoshi, who were looking on.

On the July 23, 2009, edition of Impact!, Eric Young joined the team of A.J. Styles, Daniels and Beer Money, Inc. to face the British Invasion, Kiyoshi and Bashir in a ten-man tag team match. However, in the conclusion of the match, Young turned on the TNA originals by hitting Styles with a spike piledriver and allowing him to be pinned. Eric Young then became leader of a new faction named World Elite, consisting of himself (representing Canada), Bashir (representing Iran), Kiyoshi (representing Japan), and The British Invasion (representing the United Kingdom). The following week, Young debuted a new look that included a shaved head and wearing new attire, as went on to defeat Daniels before helping Doug Williams and Brutus Magnus win the IWGP Tag Team Championship from Team 3D.

=== Alliance and feud with the Main Event Mafia ===
On the August 6 episode of Impact! it was revealed that Kurt Angle and Eric Young had made a deal to turn the Main Event Mafia and the World Elite factions into one super faction. On the September 10 edition of Impact!, World Elite recruited Homicide (representing Puerto Rico) into their group, turning him heel in the process. On the October 1 edition of Impact! the alliance between World Elite and Main Event Mafia came to an end in an all out brawl between the two factions. At Bound for Glory Young pinned Kevin Nash in a three-way dance, which also included Hernandez, to win the TNA Legends Championship. In a four way Full Metal Mayhem Tag Team match, the British Invasion lost the IWGP tag titles but won the TNA World Tag Team Championship.

On the October 29 edition of Impact! Young renamed the Legends Championship to the "TNA Global Championship" and claimed he wouldn't defend it on U.S. soil or against any American wrestler. On the same night, after Angle announced the death of the Main Event Mafia and turned face, Kevin Nash also became a face as he began feuding with Eric Young and the World Elite. However, the following month at Turning Point Nash helped World Elite members Doug Williams and Brutus Magnus retain their TNA World Tag Team Championship, thus once again becoming a heel. On the following edition of Impact!, Nash congratulated Young on outsmarting him at Bound for Glory and aligned himself with the World Elite, ironically becoming the faction's American representative in the process despite the faction's anti-American leanings. At Final Resolution Young, Bashir, Homicide, Kiyoshi, Terry and Nash took part in the "Feast or Fired" match, with Nash, Terry and Bashir coming out of the match with briefcases despite Young ordering them not to get the briefcases. After the match it was revealed that Nash had earned himself a shot at fellow World Elite members Brutus Magnus & Doug Williams TNA World Tag Team Championship and Terry a shot at the X Division Championship, while Bashir had gotten a pink slip and was as a result fired from TNA. On January 17, 2010, at Genesis, Williams and Magnus lost the World Tag Team Title to Matt Morgan and Hernandez. On January 27, 2010, Eric Young lost the Global Championship to World Elite team mate Rob Terry at a house show in Cardiff, Wales. On the following day's Impact!, Williams used Terry's "Feast or Fired" briefcase to get a shot at Amazing Red's X Division Championship and quickly defeated him for the title.

=== Dissolution and aftermath ===
Soon after, the members of The World Elite began to focus on separate goals. On the January 4, 2010, edition of Impact! Homicide turned on Kiyoshi, after which both of them left World Elite. After months of abuse, Terry finally turned on Magnus and left World Elite on the February 18 edition of Impact. After being defeated by Terry at Destination X, Magnus left World Elite, while Williams moved on to wrestling in the X Division. Eric Young and Kevin Nash ended World Elite to join Scott Hall to re-form The Band.

== Championships and accomplishments ==
- Total Nonstop Action Wrestling
  - IWGP Tag Team Championship (1 time) – Magnus and Williams
  - TNA Global Championship (2 times) – Young (1) and Terry (1)
  - TNA World Tag Team Championship (1 time) – Magnus and Williams
  - TNA X Division Championship (1 time) – Williams
  - Feast or Fired (2009 – X Division Championship contract) – Terry
  - Feast or Fired (2009 – World Tag Team Championship contract) – Nash
  - Feast or Fired (2009 – Pink Slip) – Bashir
