= Main Event Mafia =

Professional wrestling stable

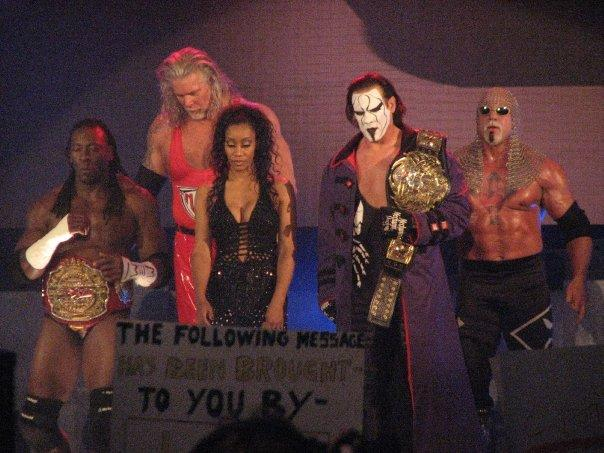
- Booker T (left), Sharmell (next to Booker), Nash (back left), Sting (center) and Steiner (right)

Stable
- Members: See below
- Name: Main Event Mafia
- Debut: October 23, 2008 (original incarnation); June 13, 2013 (second incarnation)
- Disbanded: October 22, 2009 (original incarnation); November 7, 2013 (second incarnation)
- Years active: 2008–2009, 2013

The Main Event Mafia was an American professional wrestling stable in the American promotion Total Nonstop Action Wrestling (TNA). Beginning in 2008, the group included former WWF/E wrestler Kurt Angle as leader, four of the former World Championship Wrestling (WCW) alumni Sting (who was the second leader before being ousted), Kevin Nash (with Survivor: The Amazon winner Jenna Morasca), Booker T (with his real-life wife Sharmell) and Scott Steiner as well as Samoa Joe and Traci Brooks. All the male members of the stable were multiple-time world heavyweight champions of multiple companies (with the exception of Magnus, who would win the TNA World Heavyweight Championship in December 2013), TNA included, with extensive experience in main event matches. The MEM at one time held all the male titles TNA had to offer.

The group formed in October 2008 and had been largely successful, with Sting and Kurt Angle being TNA World Heavyweight Champions, Booker T introducing a new championship into TNA called the TNA Legends Championship and declaring himself the first official champion, with Kevin Nash going on to win the belt as well, and Booker T and Scott Steiner holding the TNA World Tag Team Championship. The group's formation was the result of TNA introducing a new storyline in which the veterans began a rivalry with younger talent within the company who called themselves The TNA Front Line; with the MEM being the villains of the storyline as the veterans modelling themselves after the Mafia, portrayed as being upset at the disrespect being shown by the younger wrestlers.

In June 2013, Sting announced the return of the Main Event Mafia, now as a heroic stable, in response to a year-long war between the TNA roster and the Aces & Eights. The group included past members of the original Mafia (Sting, Kurt Angle, and Samoa Joe) and new members Magnus and Quinton "Rampage" Jackson.

== History ==
=== Background ===
In the summer of 2008, A.J. Styles was being attacked by the villainous alliance of Booker T, Team 3D and Tomko until Karen Angle got then husband Kurt Angle to help Styles. However, Kurt then joined in on the assault on Styles, planting the seeds for the Main Event Mafia. Tomko left the group after taking a year-long hiatus from TNA. At TNA's July pay-per-view Victory Road during a bout between the face Samoa Joe and heel Booker T for the TNA World Heavyweight Championship, Joe went on a storyline rampage and attacked referees, security and Booker T without on-screen mercy. Sting, who was also a face, then entered the arena and stopped Joe's assault. However, Joe gave Sting the middle finger and continued his assault on Booker T. This angered Sting to a point in which he grabbed Joe and hit him with a baseball bat, thus turning heel in the process, allowing Booker T to steal the TNA World Heavyweight Championship belt from Joe. Following the event, Sting did not appear on TNA's primary television program TNA Impact! in a wrestling role or to explain his actions at Victory Road. Instead, he was only seen standing in the rafters on each episode. As a result of Sting's actions at Victory Road, a storyline within TNA began that saw a possible alliance between Booker T and Sting.

On the July 31 episode of TNA Impact!, Samoa Joe was brawling with Booker T, a baseball bat fell from the ceiling hanging by a wire; Booker T grabbed it and smashed Joe over the back with it. At TNA's August pay-per-view Hard Justice, Sting attacked A.J. Styles, an on-screen ally of Joe's, after Styles had defeated Kurt Angle in a Last Man Standing match. The reasons for Sting's actions were eventually revealed on the August 14 episode of TNA Impact!, in which he stated that he attacked Joe and Styles because they were not showing enough respect for veterans such as Angle and Booker T by doing what they did at the events. Sting, being a veteran of the sport himself, went on to say when he was Styles' and Joe's age, if he had a match with a veteran, he pinned them and walked away, not adding insult to injury by trying to end their careers, like Styles and Joe were trying to do. This sparked a rivalry between the three, which later involved Angle and Booker T.

At TNA's September pay-per-view No Surrender, Sting announced that, at TNA's October pay-per-view Bound for Glory IV, he would challenge Joe for the TNA World Heavyweight Championship; later in the event during a match between Christian Cage, Angle, and Joe, Jeff Jarrett made his on-screen return to TNA after not being seen in TNA since late May 2007, by helping Joe retain the TNA World Heavyweight Championship. Jarrett went on to Bound for Glory to defeat Angle in a standard match with Mick Foley as the Special Guest Ringside Enforcer. Also at Bound for Glory, Sting defeated Joe after Kevin Nash turned heel by striking his friend Joe with a baseball bat while the referee was not looking to allow Sting to take the advantage and pin Joe after a Scorpion Death Drop. Nash's actions were explained on the October 16 episode of TNA Impact!, when he said that Joe disrespected him and his long-time real-life friend Scott Hall in late 2007 when Joe insulted Hall for not showing up at TNA's December pay-per-view Turning Point.

=== Feud with TNA Frontline (2008–2009) ===
The group officially joined together on the October 23 episode of TNA Impact! In a segment between Nash, Booker T, Angle, Sting, and Jeremy Borash, Angle announced that the four had joined together to form a group of legends called The Main Event Mafia. Team 3D were offered a spot in the group, seemingly accepting before attacking them, turning face. The goal of the group was to start a "war" against the younger talent to take what they deserved: respect. The following week, they added Scott Steiner to the Main Event Mafia as he made his return from an injury and attacked Joe, Styles and their allies. Steiner notably spared using his lead pipe on his protégé, Petey Williams, who backed off as soon as he saw him.

At Turning Point, Booker T defeated Christian Cage to retain the TNA Legends Championship. As per the stipulation, Cage was forced to join the Main Event Mafia, however, the Main Event Mafia attacked Cage and kicked him out of the group because they believed he was leaving TNA for WWE (later proven to be true). The Main Event Mafia proceeded to go on a rampage, assaulting Brother Ray, Samoa Joe, Petey Williams (Steiner doing the deed, finally severing the ties between the two), B.G. James, Rhino, Jeff Jarrett and A.J. Styles, injuring all in their "hits". At Genesis, Kevin Nash could not make it to the event due to a legitimate staph infection in his left elbow. When it came time for his tag team match, Booker T announced that they had found a suitable replacement in Cute Kip James. Kip was not intended to be a long-term addition to the team, as he quickly disappeared from the main event scene as the original five members of the Main Event Mafia resumed their positions. At Destination X, Booker T lost the TNA Legends Championship to A.J. Styles while Sting retained the TNA World Heavyweight Championship against Angle with Jeff Jarrett as the special guest referee and Mick Foley was the special guest enforcer. At Lockdown, Sting lost the TNA World Heavyweight Championship to Mick Foley and the rest of the Main Event Mafia (Nash, Steiner, Booker T and Angle) lost to Team Jarrett, which consisted of Jeff Jarrett, Samoa Joe, A.J. Styles and Christopher Daniels. At Sacrifice, Sting pinned Angle in an Ultimate Sacrifice match also involving Mick Foley and Jeff Jarrett to become the new Godfather of the Main Event Mafia. Sting immediately made his new leadership felt, as on the May 28, 2009, edition of TNA Impact!, he dismissed Sharmell, Jenna Morasca and Angle's security men Big Rocco and Sally Boy from the alliance as part of his new leadership. Rocco and Sally promptly signed on to be Mick Foley's security the following week.

Heading into Slammiversary, Matt Morgan expressed his wishes to join the Main Event Mafia. This would lead to Angle facing Morgan in a singles match on TNA Impact! which Angle would win. After the match, Angle shook Morgan's hand, showing that he would want him in the Main Event Mafia. On the following week's TNA Impact!, during a King of the Mountain qualification match between Angle and Sting, Morgan interfered and helped Angle win. After the match, Angle thanked Morgan for helping him win. Morgan would go on and ask Sting to let him become a member of the Main Event Mafia. Sting agreed to a match at Slammiversary against Morgan where, if Morgan won, he could join the group. Sting went on to defeat Morgan at Slammiversary. In the final match of Slammiversary, Angle won the King of the Mountain match to win the TNA World Heavyweight Championship after Samoa Joe turned heel and joined the Main Event Mafia by handing him the TNA World Heavyweight Championship belt, backstabbing the TNA Front Line in the process. On the June 25 edition of TNA Impact!, it was explained that Joe had been paid off by the Main Event Mafia due to them being unable to defeat him. The Main Event Mafia, as well as Morgan, attacked Sting in disapproval of his leadership, with Angle announcing that he had regained leadership of the group. The following week, Sting saved A.J. Styles from a beat down from his former stablemates, attacking each member of the Main Event Mafia with his baseball bat and stealing Angle's TNA World Heavyweight Championship belt. The following week, Sting confronted Samoa Joe, claiming to unveil Joe's mystery adviser before Victory Road, where he would be facing Samoa Joe. Later on in the show, Sting disguised himself as Joe and nearly dragged out Joe's adviser from his car, before Joe stopped him, choking him out with the Coquina Clutch and his signature tribal knife. Joe then took back the TNA World Heavyweight Championship, returning it to Angle during the beatdown on Mick Foley at the end of the show. At Victory Road, the Main Event Mafia gained full control of TNA's championship scene as Nash won the TNA Legends Championship from A.J. Styles to bring the title back to the Main Event Mafia. At the same event, Booker T and Steiner defeated Beer Money, Inc. for the TNA World Tag Team Championship, Angle defeated Foley to retain the TNA World Heavyweight Championship and Taz was also revealed to be Joe's adviser; Taz would later state that he was just an associate of the Main Event Mafia. On the July 30 episode of TNA Impact!, Kevin Nash lost the TNA Legends Championship to Mick Foley in a tag team match with Kurt Angle against Bobby Lashley and Mick Foley.

=== The Elite Mafia and dissolution (2009) ===
On the August 6 episode of TNA Impact! it was revealed that the Main Event Mafia would join forces with World Elite, a stable consisting of Eric Young, Sheik Abdul Bashir, Kiyoshi, Brutus Magnus, Doug Williams and Rob Terry to form a super-stable known as The Elite Mafia. At Hard Justice, the Main Event Mafia further solidified their dominance with Kevin Nash regaining the TNA Legends Championship, Samoa Joe winning the TNA X Division Championship, and Booker T, Scott Steiner and Kurt Angle retaining the TNA World Tag Team and TNA World Heavyweight Championships. By Hard Justice, the Main Event Mafia controlled every male championship in TNA. At No Surrender, Angle lost the TNA World Heavyweight Championship to A.J. Styles. On the October 1 edition of TNA Impact! the alliance between the Main Event Mafia and World Elite crumbled after an all-out brawl between the two factions. The following week, Joe lost the TNA X Division Championship to Amazing Red after Bobby Lashley interfered. The Main Event Mafia's championship match losing streak continued at Bound for Glory, where Nash lost the TNA Legends Championship to World Elite leader Eric Young, while Booker T and Steiner lost the TNA World Tag Team Championship to Doug Williams and Brutus Magnus, also of the World Elite. At the same PPV Angle narrowly defeated long-time foe Matt Morgan and afterwards shook his hand. On the following edition of TNA Impact!, the stable's future was thrown into question, when Booker T was announced as having left TNA and Angle admitted that he had been wrong all along about the younger talent of TNA and praised the likes of A.J. Styles and Matt Morgan, thus becoming a face. However, Scott Steiner still wore Main Event Mafia clothing and said that the group was still alive as long as he was involved and that he did not take orders from Kurt Angle. He still maintained that the young talent did not show enough respect to the veterans of the professional wrestling business. However, in February 2010, Steiner left TNA, effectively ending the Main Event Mafia.

=== Aborted return (2011) ===
In January 2011, TNA started a storyline aiming to bring back the Main Event Mafia as a face group on the February 3 edition of TNA Impact! to feud with Immortal. Scott Steiner returned to TNA on the January 27 edition of TNA Impact! and aligned himself with Kurt Angle, but on January 30, Booker T and Kevin Nash instead made surprise returns to World Wrestling Entertainment (WWE) to compete at the Royal Rumble pay-per-view, forcing TNA to change their plans and abandon the storyline.

=== Main Event Mafia reunion (2013) ===
On the June 13, 2013 episode of Impact Wrestling, Sting announced the return of the Main Event Mafia to combat Bully Ray's Aces & Eights stable, who had been running rampant throughout the entire TNA roster. On June 20, 2013, the second member of the new Main Event Mafia was revealed to be Kurt Angle. On the tapings of the June 27 episode of Impact Wrestling, Samoa Joe was revealed as the third member, as he aided Sting and Angle after they attacked the Aces & Eights to help Samoa Joe defeat Mr. Anderson in a submission victory in his second Bound for Glory Series bout. On the July 4 episode of Impact Wrestling, Magnus was revealed to be the fourth member, as nominated by Samoa Joe because, as of the time of the announcement, Magnus was leading the Bound for Glory Series, but also the fact that they had fought alongside and against each other many times. In the main event between Chris Sabin, Austin Aries and Manik, the Main Event Mafia was stationed at ringside to prevent the Aces & Eights from getting involved. After Chris Sabin won the match, the Main Event Mafia congratulated Sabin on the win and appeared to back him up. On the July 11 episode of Impact Wrestling', Quinton "Rampage" Jackson was announced as the fifth member. On the August 22 episode of Impact Wrestling, due to Kurt Angle taking a hiatus on August 2 to go into rehab for (legit) alcohol use, A.J. Styles took his place as the fifth member of the team and helped pin Devon in the 5-on-5 tag match, forcing Devon to leave TNA. On September 12, on the No Surrender episode of Impact Wrestling, Hulk Hogan announced that Bellator MMA had pulled Rampage Jackson and Aces & Eights member Tito Ortiz from TNA programming due to their upcoming PPV fight, thus removing Jackson from the Main Event Mafia. In the main event of the night, Magnus lost the BFG Series finals to A.J. Styles. During his match, EGO interfered. Due to this, Magnus started a feud with EGO. After losing to EGO, the Main Event Mafia trio of Sting, Magnus and Joe engaged in different storylines. At Bound for Glory, Magnus defeated Sting. On the October 31 edition of Impact Wrestling Magnus won a gauntlet match by eliminating Sting to be in the TNA World Heavyweight Championship Tournament. On the following edition of Impact Wrestling, the Main Event Mafia announced that their mission was accomplished and they parted ways, with Sting saying he was going to teach the wrestlers who think that the business owes them something a lesson and Joe, Magnus, and Angle wanting to become TNA World Heavyweight Champion. Magnus ended up winning the TNA World Heavyweight Championship defeating Joe in the first round, Angle in the second round, and Jeff Hardy in the finals, but aligned himself with Dixieland and turned heel. Sting would then question Magnus why he did it, which set up a title match between the two with the added stipulation that, if Sting lost, his contract would be rendered null and void. Magnus would retain the championship with help from Dixieland, thereby forcing Sting to leave TNA forever. Magnus would then enter a feud with Joe for the title after Joe made him submit in a tag team match, with the match happening at Lockdown. Magnus retained the championship at Lockdown with help from Abyss, but would ultimately lose it to Eric Young on the April 10 episode of Impact Wrestling.

== Members ==
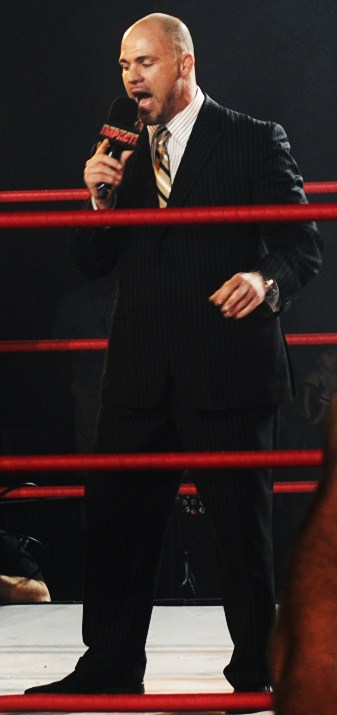
Kurt Angle as the leader of the Main Event Mafia.

| I–II | Leader(s) |
| * | Founding member(s) |

=== Main Event Mafia ===
| Member | Time |
|---|---|
| Kurt Angle (I) | October 23, 2008 – October 22, 2009 * |
| Sting (II) | October 23, 2008 – June 23, 2009 * |
| Kevin Nash | October 23, 2008 – October 22, 2009 * |
| Booker T | October 23, 2008 – October 22, 2009 * |
| Scott Steiner | October 30, 2008 – October 22, 2009 |
| Christian Cage | November 9, 2008 – November 13, 2008 |
| Samoa Joe | June 21, 2009 – October 22, 2009 |
| Traci Brooks | July 23, 2009 – October 22, 2009 |

=== Second incarnation ===
| Member | Time |
|---|---|
| Sting | June 13, 2013 – November 7, 2013 |
| Kurt Angle | June 20, 2013 – November 7, 2013 |
| Samoa Joe | June 27, 2013 – November 7, 2013 |
| Magnus | July 4, 2013 – November 7, 2013 |
| Rampage Jackson | July 11, 2013 – September 12, 2013 |

== Championships and accomplishments ==
- Pro Wrestling Illustrated
  - PWI ranked Sting #9 of the top 500 singles wrestlers in the PWI 500 in 2009
  - PWI ranked Angle #12 of the top 500 singles wrestlers in the PWI 500 in 2009
  - PWI ranked Joe #29 of the top 500 singles wrestlers in the PWI 500 in 2009
  - PWI ranked Booker #38 of the top 500 singles wrestlers in the PWI 500 in 2009
  - PWI ranked Magnus #43 of the top 500 singles wrestlers in the PWI 500 in 2013
  - PWI ranked Steiner #71 of the top 500 singles wrestlers in the PWI 500 in 2009
  - PWI ranked Nash #105 of the top 500 singles wrestlers in the PWI 500 in 2009
- Total Nonstop Action Wrestling
  - TNA World Heavyweight Championship (2 times) – Sting (1), Kurt Angle (1)
  - TNA Legends Championship (3 times) – Booker T (1), Kevin Nash (2)
  - TNA X Division Championship (1 time) – Samoa Joe
  - TNA World Tag Team Championship (1 time) – Booker T and Scott Steiner
  - King of the Mountain (2009) – Kurt Angle

== See also ==
- The Millionaire's Club
- New World Order (professional wrestling)
