= TNA Front Line =

Professional wrestling stable

The TNA Front Line
- The logo of TNA Front Line.

Stable
- Members: A.J. Styles; Samoa Joe; Rhino; Brother Devon; Brother Ray; Daniels; Alex Shelley; Chris Sabin; Consequences Creed; James Storm; Jay Lethal; Robert Roode; ODB; Petey Williams; Eric Young
- Name(s): TNA Front Line; Frontline; TNA Originals
- Debut: October 30, 2008
- Disbanded: July 23, 2009
- Years active: 2008–2009

The TNA Front Line (also spelled Frontline and commonly referred to as the Front Line) was a heroic alliance in the professional wrestling promotion Total Nonstop Action Wrestling (TNA). They were also known as The TNA Originals. They feuded with The Main Event Mafia.

== History ==
On the October 23, 2008 episode of Impact! Kurt Angle, Sting, Booker T and Kevin Nash formed a villainous alliance called the Main Event Mafia, whose aim was to teach the younger stars of TNA about respect. The next week, Scott Steiner joined the Mafia. The following week Samoa Joe and A.J. Styles asked the younger talent in TNA to join them against the Main Event Mafia, they were soon joined by many of the younger stars. At this point, they were called the TNA Originals. Later in the event, after his match with Abyss, Kurt Angle attacked Abyss, but Matt Morgan came to his aid. Booker T and Kevin Nash then came to help Angle, and A.J. Styles, Samoa Joe and the other members of the Front Line came out to help Morgan and Abyss. Initially gaining the upper hand, they were attacked by Scott Steiner who was revealed to be the fifth member of the Main Event Mafia. At Turning Point, Styles was defeated by Sting in the main event, and Samoa Joe was defeated by Kevin Nash. Another match at the event was Christian Cage (who had refused to join sides with either the Main Event Mafia or the Frontline) against Booker T. The stipulation was that if Cage lost than he would have to join the Main Event Mafia. Cage lost, but he was attacked by the Main Event Mafia who said it was because he was planning to leave TNA. Because of the attack, Cage’s real life friend Rhino joined the younger talent, becoming leader and changing the name to The TNA Front Line. Rhino had not been with the Front Line for when he began training Jesse Neal to become a pro wrestler.

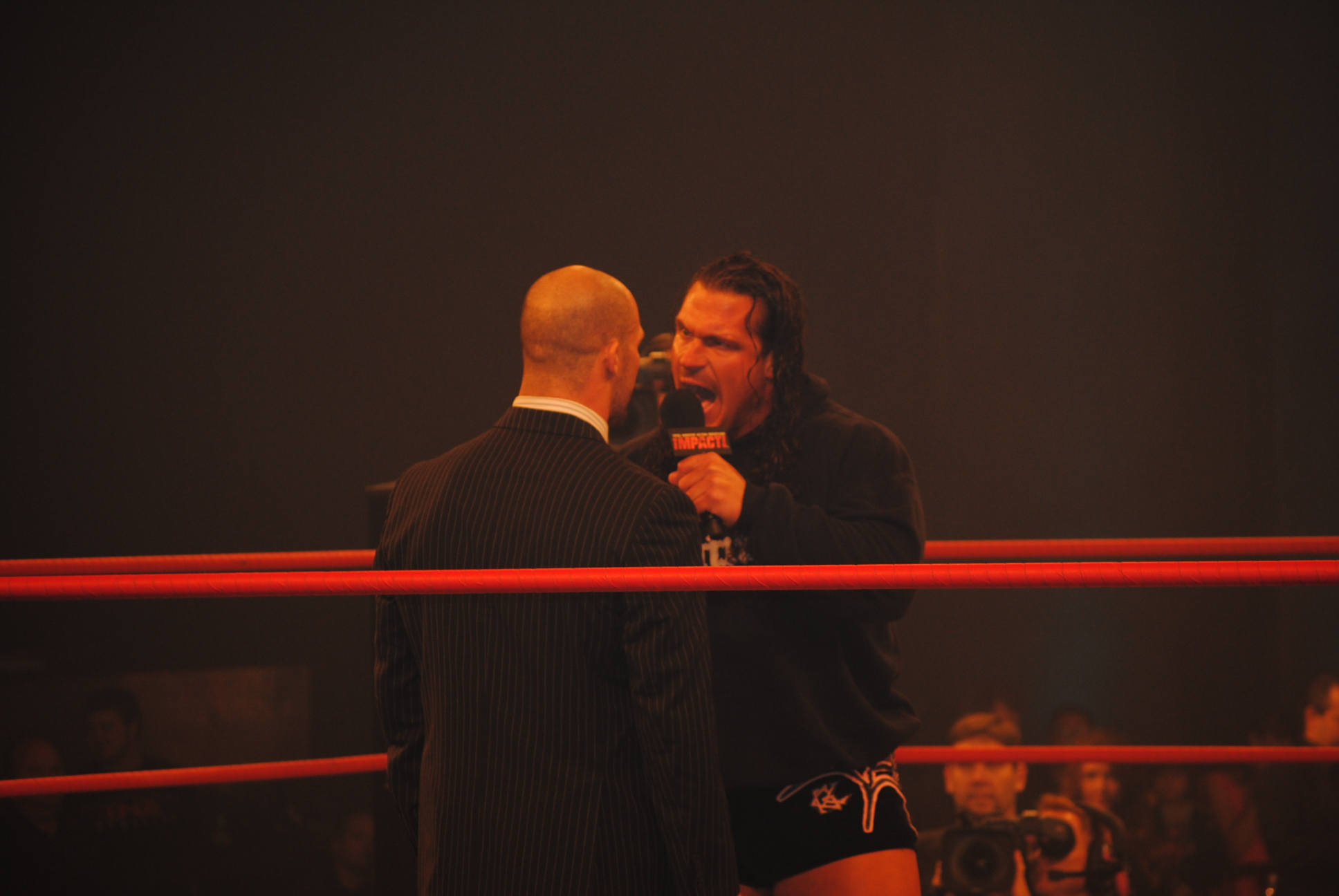
Rhino during his feud with the Godfather of the Main Event Mafia Kurt Angle

Angle and the Main Event Mafia then attempted to recruit Team 3D. Team 3D appeared to join the Main Event Mafia but turned face by double crossing the Mafia and jumping them along with TNA Front Line leaders Samoa Joe, A.J. Styles, and Rhino. They also attempted to put former ally Kurt Angle through a table. The Front Line then formed alliances with other wrestlers, primarily Mick Foley, Jeff Jarrett and Abyss. Petey Williams, however, was released from TNA, thus removing him from the alliance. ODB was with the Front Line when it first formed. She joined to feud with Sharmell of the Main Event Mafia. She has not been a Front Line member since she paired up with Cody Deaner. While the group's stand remained active in TNA, their status was in question. Only Mick Foley, Jeff Jarrett, and A.J. Styles were still involved in feuds with the Main Event Mafia. All the other members had since become involved in different storylines. The Frontline name was rarely if ever mentioned for a continuous period of months. Eventually, Samoa Joe turned on his friends by helping Kurt Angle reclaim the TNA World Heavyweight Championship at Slammiversary, joining the Main Event Mafia in the process. On the July 23, 2009, episode of Impact!, A.J. Styles, Daniels, Robert Roode, James Storm, and Eric Young regrouped as the TNA Originals. During their 10-man tag team match against The British Invasion, Kiyoshi, and Sheik Abdul Bashir, Young turned against his teammates by attacking Styles and aligned himself with their opponents. After the match, Young announced that he joined an alliance with their opponents, dubbing themselves "the World Elite". All the remaining members of the TNA Originals then moved on to separate feuds and story lines and have not appeared together as a team since the emergence of the World Elite.

Through most of 2010 and 2011, Styles, Roode, and Storm, as well as Kazarian, joined at differing points by others including Christopher Daniels, became the stable Fortune, whose character purpose was similar to the Originals, fighting as the young guys facing the more established stars.

== Championships and accomplishments ==
- New Japan Pro-Wrestling
  - IWGP Tag Team Championship (1 time) – Team 3D (Brother Ray and Brother Devon)
  - IWGP Junior Heavyweight Tag Team Championship (1 time) – The Motor City Machine Guns (Chris Sabin and Alex Shelley)
- Total Nonstop Action Wrestling
  - TNA Legends Championship (1 time) – A.J. Styles
  - TNA X Division Championship (2 times) – Eric Young (1) and Alex Shelley (1)
  - TNA World Tag Team Championship (1 time) – Jay Lethal and Consequences Creed

== Reception ==
In 2008, the Baltimore Sun argued that the TNA Originals feud with the Main Event Mafia was "about as compelling as the basketball rivalry between the Harlem Globetrotters and the Washington Generals". Editor Kevin Eck suggested that while "A victory by a TNA Original over a MEM member would be a bigger upset than if the winless Detroit Lions knocked off the unbeaten Tennessee Titans on Thanksgiving", it was unclear that fans would care.

== See also ==
- Main Event Mafia
- The New Blood
- Sports Entertainment Xtreme
- Fortune (professional wrestling)
