= Akira Raijin =

Japanese professional wrestler

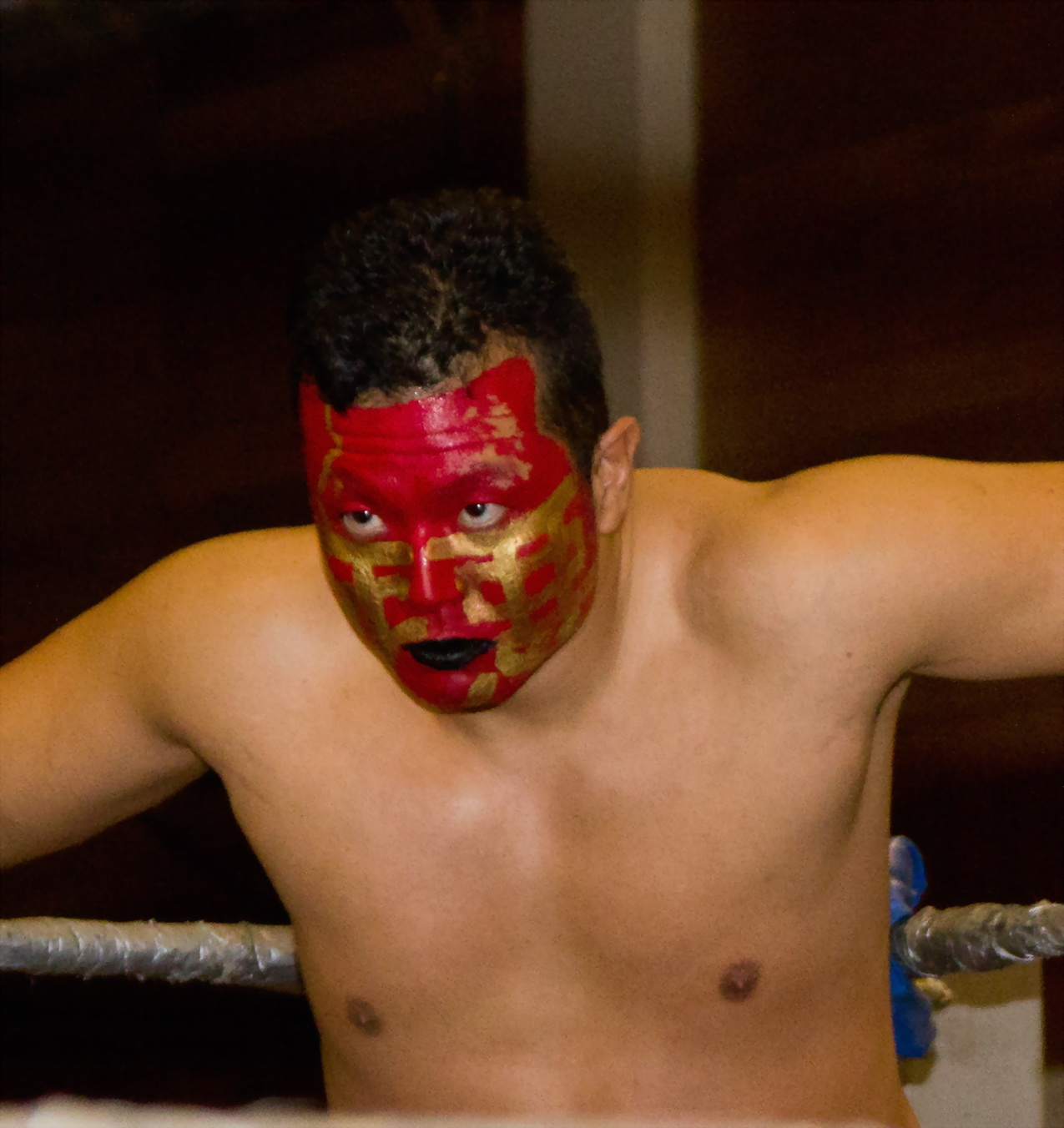
- Kawabata as Kiyoshi at an MPW event in October 2011

Personal information
- Born: Akira Kawabata; July 17, 1978 (age 48) Takarazuka, Hyōgo, Japan

Professional wrestling career
- Ring name(s): Akira Raijin; Akira Thunder Raijin; Kaminari; Kawabata; Kowabata; Kiyoshi; Suicide; Sushi
- Billed height: 6 ft 0 in (1.83 m)
- Billed weight: 231 lb (105 kg)
- Billed from: Osaka, Japan
- Trained by: Masanobu Kurisu; Animal Hamaguchi; Arashi; Kaz Hayashi; Scott D'Amore; Shigeo Okumura; Keiji Mutoh
- Debut: February 1, 1998

Akira Kawabata (川畑 顕, Kawabata Akira) (born July 17, 1978) is a Japanese professional wrestler, currently working for the independent circuit in under the ring name Sushi (stylized as SUSHI). He is best known for his work in All Japan Pro Wrestling (AJPW), He is a two-time holder of the Gaora TV Championship and under the ring name Akira Raijin (雷陣 明, Raijin Akira). He is also known for working in North America for the Total Nonstop Action Wrestling (TNA), where is under the ring names Kiyoshi and Suicide.

== Early life ==
Akira Kawabata was born on July 17, 1978, in Takarazuka, Hyōgo.

== Professional wrestling career ==
=== Early career ===
Trained by former junior heavyweight contender Masanobu Kurisu, Kawabata made his debut in 1998, using the ring name Akira Raijin, working primarily on the Japanese independent circuit.

=== All Japan Pro Wrestling (2004–2010) ===
On August 28, 2004, Raijin debuted for All Japan Pro Wrestling losing to Ryuji Hijikata. His early years with All Japan would be mostly uneventful which is normal for a new wrestler in a Japanese promotion. On June 17, 2005, Raijin teamed with Nobukazu Hirai in a tournament to determine the number one conders for the All Asia Tag Team Championship but lost to Katsuhiko Nakajima and Tomoaki Honma. In November, Raijin and Kohei Suwama participated in the 2005 Real World Tag League but would not pass the round robin stage. On January 4, 2007, Raijin along with Kikutaro and Nobutaka Araya took on, and lost to, El Samurai, Masanobu Fuchi and Ryusuke Taguchi at New Japan Pro-Wrestling's Wrestle Kingdom in Tokyo Dome. On May 13, All Japan said farewell to Raijin along with Brute Issei, who both went on overseas training excursions.

Raijin returned to All Japan on June 22, 2008, but just three months later it was announced that he would be travelling back to North America, to work for Total Nonstop Action Wrestling (TNA), who had signed him to a contract. On October 11 Raijin lost to Suwama in his All Japan farewell match.

On September 13, 2009, Raijin made a one-night return to All Japan, teaming up with Great Muta in a winning effort against Suwama and Shuji Kondo.

On March 21, 2010, Raijin made another return to All Japan, now using his TNA ring name Kiyoshi, he teamed up with Bushi to defeat the tag team of Chessman and Dark Ozz. On April 3 Kiyoshi entered All Japan's 2010 Champion Carnival. He defeated René Duprée and Suwama, but lost to Taiyō Kea and Masakatsu Funaki in the round robin stage of the tournament, finished third in his block and did not advance to the semifinals. On April 11, the final night of the tournament, Kiyoshi teamed with Satoshi Kojima to defeat Gurentai (Nosawa Rongai and Taiyō Kea) in a tag team match.

=== North American independent circuit (2007–2012) ===
Raijin left Japan to live in Windsor, Ontario, Canada with Scott D'Amore to gain "learning experience" in North America. Raijin would go on to work for various promotions within Canada and eventually branched off into the United States. Raijin wrestled for Total Nonstop Action Wrestling, teaming with Brute Issei and losing to Havok and Martyr in a tryout dark match on July 15, 2007, prior to the Victory Road pay-per-view. On August 12, 2007, Raijin appeared at Juggalo Championship Wrestling's premier show, Bloodymania. He teamed with Brute Issei in the 8 Team Tag Team Elimination match for the JCW Tag Team Championship, becoming the fifth team eliminated in the match. On August 18, at Chikara, Raijin took on Mike Quackenbush in a losing effort for the NWA World Junior Heavyweight Championship. On April 23, 2008, Raijin took part in JCW's "Slam TV Tour 2008". He debuted as Kowabata, being managed by "The Guidance Counselor" Scott D'Amore. After a series of singles victories, Kowabata was put into a stable alongside Scott D'Amore and Conrad "Lights Out" Kennedy. D'Amore proclaimed that the team of Kowabata and Kennedy would reform JCW. At the following show, Kowabata and Kennedy defeated fan favorites The Ring Rydas. Raijin took part in two BSE Pro tournaments which included Adrenaline Cup and the Sudbury Scramble Cup, both of which he did not win. Kowabata was set to appear at the 2008 Hallowicked After Party, but was signed to TNA weeks prior to the event, resulting in him having to cancel the appearance.

While part of TNA, Raijin continued to wrestle on the independent circuit. On December 20, Kowabata took on JCW Heavyweight Champion Corporal Robinson at Big Ballas X–Mas Party '08 in a losing effort. Raijin would mostly appear for Border City Wrestling and even had a shot at the BCW Can-Am Heavyweight Championship which he lost. On March 13, 2010, Raijin took on Kevin Steen for the Capital City Championship Combat Championship and lost. Raijin, as Kowabata, returned to JCW on May 4, 2011, at the St. Andrews Brawl internet pay-per-view, where he defeated Bill Martel in a singles match. At the June 30 pay-per-view Kawabata defeated Jimmy Jacobs in a singles match. His final match in North America came on January 28, 2012, when he lost to Josh Alexander at Squared Circle Wrestling (2CW).

=== Total Nonstop Action Wrestling (2008–2011) ===
In the later half of 2008, Kawabata signed a two-year deal with Total Nonstop Action Wrestling after an appearance on Border City Wrestling's (BCW) 15th anniversary show. He was given a heel gimmick, Kiyoshi, which resembled his mentor Great Muta, together with similar face paint and mannerisms. In his debut match on December 18, 2008, he defeated Consequences Creed with a moonsault to advance to the semifinals in a tournament for the vacant TNA X Division Championship. On December 25, he lost to Chris Sabin, failing to advance into the finals of the tournament.

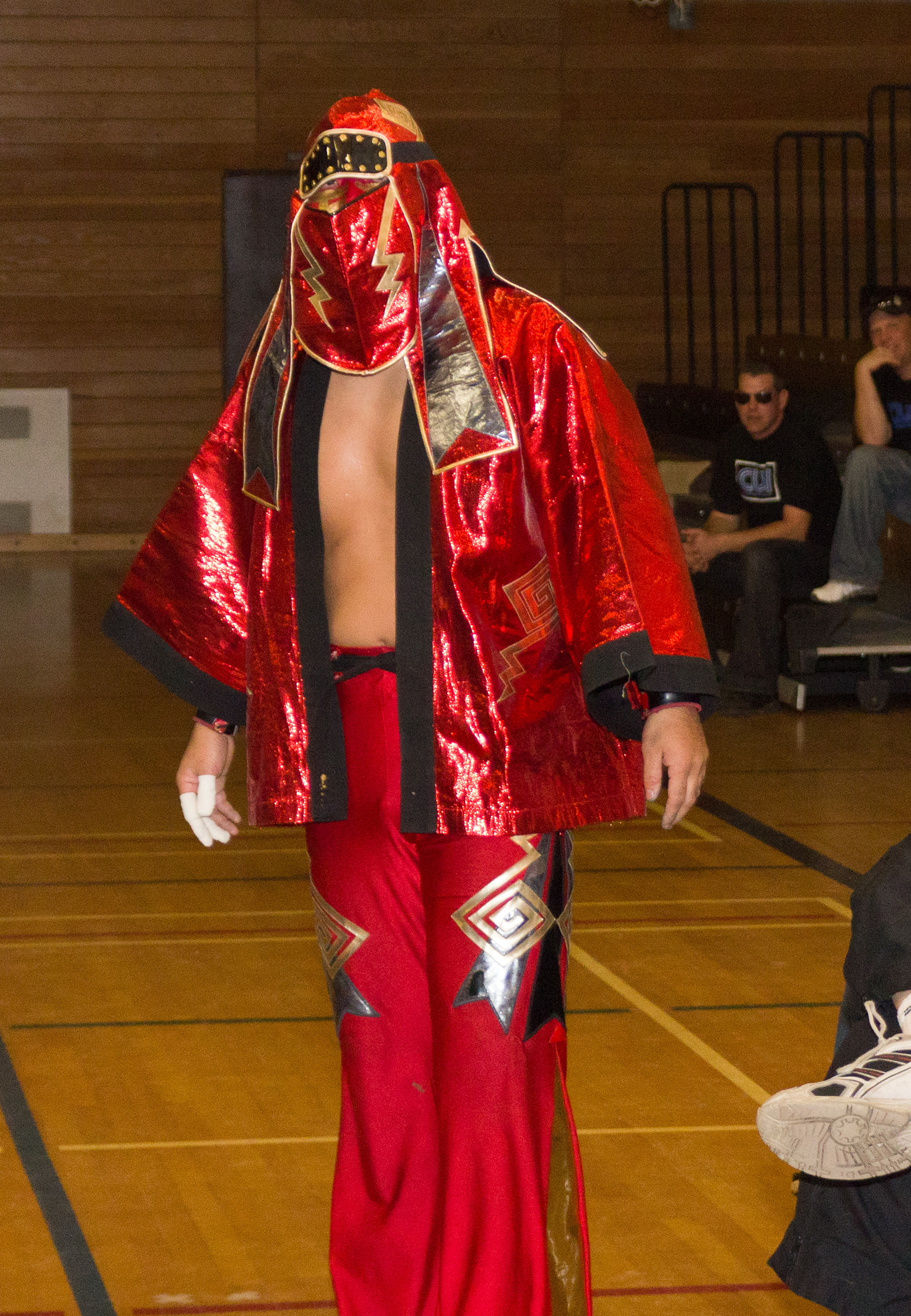
Kiyoshi in full pre-ring garb making his way to the ring

On the March 5, 2009, episode of TNA Impact!, Kiyoshi, accompanied by the tag team No Limit (Yujiro and Naito), was unable to defeat the TNA X Division Champion Alex Shelley in a match for the title. On the March 14 edition of TNA Xplosion, Kiyoshi defeated Shark Boy with his signature Lightning Flash. On the March 26, 2009, episode of Impact!, Kiyoshi, accompanied by the tag team of No Limit, unsuccessfully challenged Suicide for the TNA X Division Championship. Kiyoshi and No Limit then aligned themselves with Sheik Abdul Bashir.

After No Limit left the company in May 2009, the duo of Kiyoshi and Bashir went on to form an alliance with The British Invasion of Doug Williams, Brutus Magnus and Rob Terry as well as Eric Young, known as World Elite. The members represented anti–American faction of countries, with Williams, Magnus and Terry representing Great Britain, Bashir representing Iran, Young representing Canada, Kiyoshi representing Japan and Homicide, who joined the group later, representing Puerto Rico. During the summer of 2009, Kiyoshi gradually faded out his Great Muta look and debuted a new look, complete with new ring attire and altered hair style. The World Elite split in early 2010, with Kiyoshi wrestled his last match so far for TNA on February 16, 2010, in an X Division three-way match, taped for Xplosion, where he and Homicide were defeated by Amazing Red. Kawabata spent the next four months wrestling part-time in Japan for All Japan Pro Wrestling.

Kawabata returned to TNA on June 14, 2010, now under a mask portraying the face character of Suicide, losing to Magnus in a match taped for Xplosion. At the July 12 tapings of Xplosion, Kawabata picked up his first victory as Suicide, defeating Eric Young.

After Kawabata's original two–year contract with TNA expired, it was announced on September 28, 2010, that he had signed a two–year contract extension with the promotion. On the October 8, 2010, edition of Xplosion Kawabata returned without the Suicide gimmick, working as Kiyoshi and forming a new tag team with compatriot Okada. They were defeated in their first match together by Ink Inc. (Jesse Neal and Shannon Moore). On October 13, Suicide's profile was removed from TNA's official website, seemingly signaling the end of the gimmick. Kiyoshi and Okada had a rematch with Ink Inc. at the December 7 tapings of Xplosion, but were once again defeated. Shortly afterwards, Kiyoshi's profile was also removed from TNA's official website.

=== Return to AJPW (2012–2017) ===
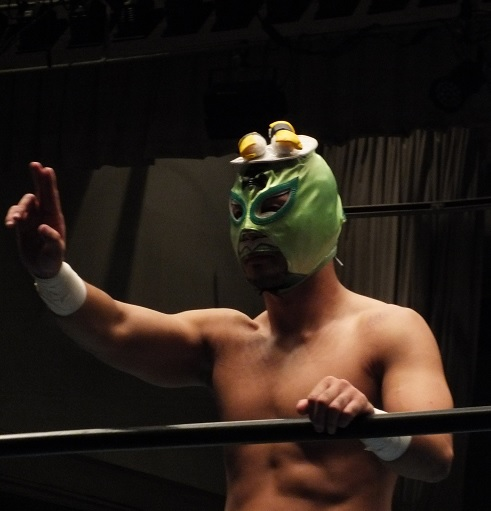
Kawabata as Sushi in July 2013

On February 29, 2012, All Japan Pro Wrestling announced that Raijin would be returning to the promotion from his American excursion on March 20. In his return match, Raijin teamed with Kaz Hayashi and Minoru Tanaka in a losing effort against the team of Gillette, Hiroshi Yamato and Kai, with Gillette pinning Raijin for the win. On April 1, Kawabata debuted as the masked character Sushi, when he entered the 2012 Junior Tag League alongside Bushi. Sushi and Bushi made it all the way to the finals of the tournament on April 14, where they were defeated by Kaz Hayashi and Shuji Kondo. In July, Sushi took part in the 2012 Junior Hyper League, where he finished with a record of three wins and two losses, failing to advance from his round-robin block. Following Bushi's departure from All Japan, Sushi formed a new partnership with rookie Andy Wu, with the two taking part in the Junior Hyper Tag League in early 2013, where they failed to advance to the finals. On April 26, Kawabata as Sushi received his first shot at the World Junior Heavyweight Championship, but was defeated by the defending champion Yoshinobu Kanemaru. Sushi re-entered the title picture on October 12 by pinning Kanemaru in a six-man tag team main event. Sushi received his title shot on October 27, but was again defeated by Kanemaru.

Afterwards, Sushi began petitioning for All Japan to restore the Gaora TV Championship, which had been quietly sidelined earlier in the year. After its restoration, Sushi entered a four-man tournament for the vacant title, defeating Hikaru Sato in his semifinal match on November 21. Three days later, Sushi defeated Dramatic Dream Team (DDT) representative Keisuke Ishii in the finals to win the tournament and become the third Gaora TV Champion. Sushi made his first successful title defense on January 3, 2014, against another DDT representative, Soma Takao. On February 23, Sushi, alongside Menso～re Oyaji, received his first shot at the All Asia Tag Team Championship. The two were, however, defeated by the defending champions, Burning (Jun Akiyama and Yoshinobu Kanemaru). On May 17, Sushi lost the Gaora TV Championship to Kotaro Suzuki in his second defense. On December 14, Sushi put his mask on the line in a tag team match, where he and "Mr. Christmas" faced Último Dragón and Masked Burning #2. Though Sushi was pinned for the win by Dragón and was per stipulation supposed to unmask himself, Mr. Christmas instead offered to unmask in his place, revealing himself as Jun Akiyama. On June 4, 2015, Sushi defeated Kenso to win the Gaora TV Championship for the second time. On August 15, Sushi fractured his jaw in a match, which sidelined him indefinitely and forced him to forfeit the Gaora TV Championship. He made his return to in-ring action on November 1. On January 15, 2017, AJPW announced that Sushi would be leaving the promotion at the end of the month and becoming a freelancer. On January 28, Sushi was defeated by Jun Akiyama in his final AJPW match.

=== Freelancing (2017–present) ===
After becoming a freelancer, Kawabata continued working under a mask as Sushi, but also resumed working unmasked as Kiyoshi.

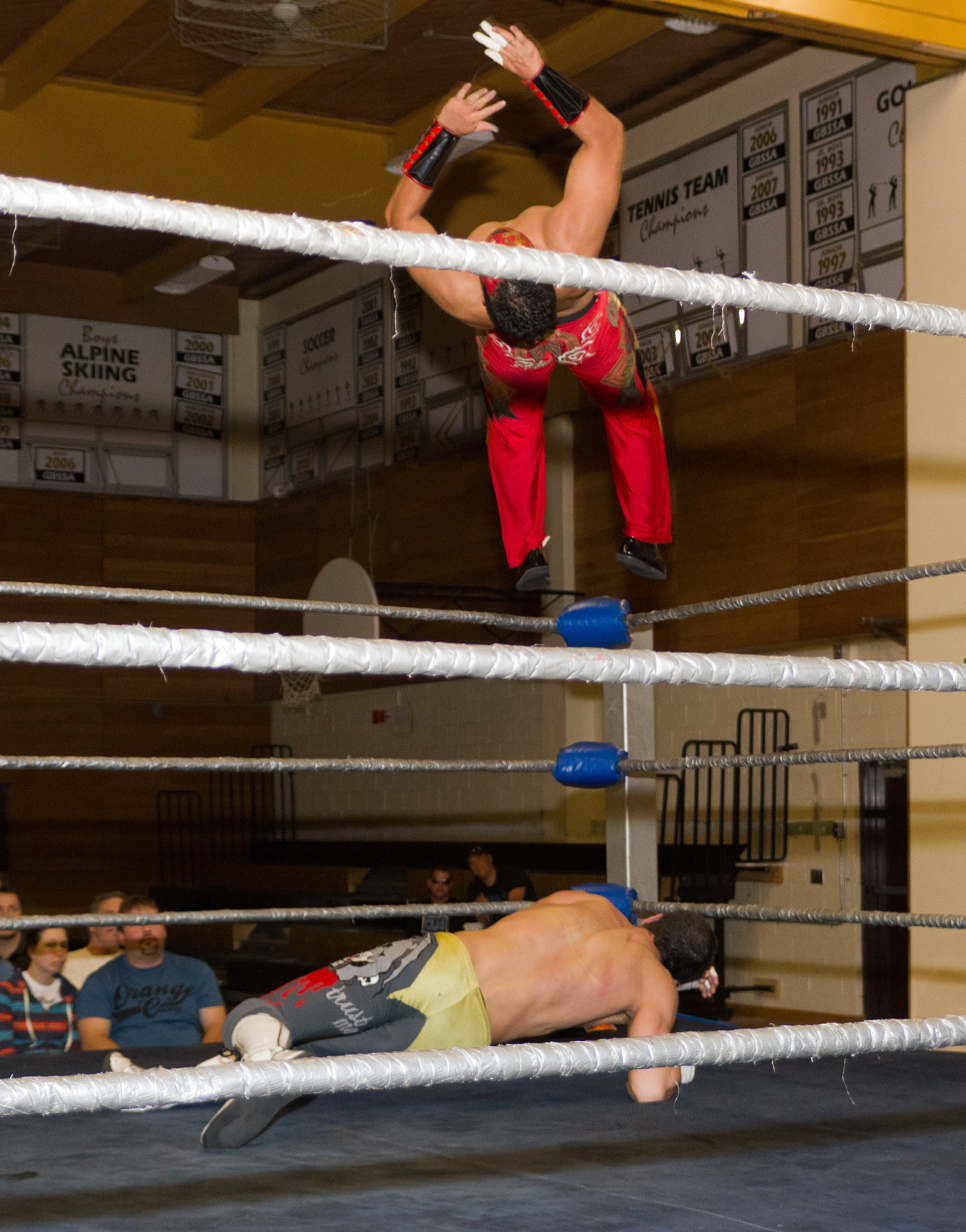
Kiyoshi performing a moonsault

== Championships and accomplishments ==
- All Japan Pro Wrestling
  - Gaora TV Championship (2 times)
  - Gaora TV Championship Tournament (2013)
- Championship International Wrestling
  - CIW United States Heavyweight Championship (1 time)
- UPW Pro Wrestling
  - UPW Alternative Championship (1 time)
- Pro Wrestling Illustrated
  - PWI ranked him #151 of the top 500 singles wrestlers in the PWI 500 in 2009
- Tenryu Project
  - Tenryu Project World 6-Man Tag Team Championship (1 time) — with Daichi Hashimoto and Hikaru Sato

=== Luchas de Apuestas record ===
Winner (wager)	Loser (wager)	Location	Event	Date	Notes
Multifacético (mask)	Kaminari (hair)	Naucalpan, Mexico State	Live event	February 17, 2008	
Último Dragón (mask)	Sushi (mask)	Tokyo, Japan	Live event	December 14, 2014	(Note: Tag team match, where Sushi and Mr. Christmas were defeated by Dragón and Masked Burning #2. Mr. Christmas unmasked instead of Sushi, the loser of the fall.)
