= BCW Can-Am Heavyweight Championship =

Professional wrestling championship

Details
- Promotion: Border City Wrestling
- Date established: June 13, 1992
- Current champion: Jake Something
- Date won: October 7, 2023
Statistics
- First champion: Canadian Patriot
- Most reigns: Scott D'Amore (5)
- Longest reign: Scott D'Amore (1790 days)
- Shortest reign: Scott D'Amore

The BCW Can-Am Heavyweight Championship is the top title contested for in the Ontario-based professional wrestling promotion Border City Wrestling.

On March 18, 2010 the BCW Can-Am Championship was unified with the BSE Pro and Neo Spirit Pro-Wrestling Championships to form the Maximum Pro Wrestling Triple Crown Championship.

On August 24, 2012 the Can-Am Championship was splintered from the Triple Crown with its defense on the debut event of BCW off-shoot promotion Can-Am Rising. Since then the title has been referred to it original title name the BCW Can-Am Heavyweight Championship, predominantly defending under the BCW banner.

== Title history ==
BCW Can-Am Heavyweight Championship

Key
No.	Overall reign number
Reign	Reign number for the specific champion
Days	Number of days held

No.	Champion	Championship change			Reign statistics		Notes	Ref.
No.	Champion	Date	Event	Location	Reign	Days	Notes	Ref.
1	The Canadian Patriot	June 13, 1992	All-Star Championship Wrestling	Amherstburg, Ontario	1	265	Defeated "Irish" Bobby Clancy in a tournament final to become the inaugural Can-Am Champion.	
2	Denny Kass	March 5, 1993	N/A	Warren, Ontario	1	85		
3	Mickey Doyle	May 29, 1993	N/A	LaSalle, Ontario	1	36		
4	Rock Stevens	July 4, 1993	N/A	LaSalle, Ontario	1	25		
—	Vacated	July 29, 1993	—	—	—	—	Stevens was stripped of the title due to unsanctioned title match.	
5	Scott D'Amore	August 14, 1993	N/A	Noëlville, Ontario	1	265	Defeated Otis Apollo to win the vacant title.	
6	Jake Steele	May 6, 1994	N/A	North Bay, Ontario	1	1		
7	Scott D'Amore	May 7, 1994	N/A	Noëlville, Ontario	2	41		
8	Mickey Doyle	June 17, 1994	N/A	Wallaceburg, Ontario	2	266		
9	Scott D'Amore	March 10, 1995	N/A	Oldcastle, Ontario	3	72		
10	Bruiser Bedlam	May 21, 1995	N/A	LaSalle, Ontario	1	33		
11	Scott D'Amore	June 23, 1995	N/A	LaSalle, Ontario	4	1,790		
12	Sabu	May 17, 2000	N/A	London, Ontario	1	294		
—	Vacated	March 7, 2001	—	Oldcastle, Ontario	—	—	Sabu was stripped of the title due to no-showing event.	
13	Tommy Dreamer	March 7, 2001	N/A	Oldcastle, Ontario	1	42	Defeated Scott D'Amore and Rhino in three-way match to win the vacant title.	
14	Scott D'Amore	April 18, 2001	N/A	Oldcastle, Ontario	5	<1		
15	Mikey Whipwreck	April 18, 2001	N/A	Oldcastle, Ontario	1	133		
—	Vacated	August 29, 2001	Mikey Whipwreck Retirement Bash	Oldcastle, Ontario	—	—	Whipwreck vacated the title after a successful defense against Little Guido.	
16	Johnny Swinger	November 27, 2001	N/A	Oldcastle, Ontario	1	464	Swinger won the vacant title in an 8-man Gauntlet Match defeating CW Anderson, Larry Destiny, Little Guido, Otis Apollo, Scott D'Amore, Simon Diamond, and Steve Corino.	
†	The Brooklyn Brawler	January 15, 2003	BCW New Years Revolution	—		N/A	Brawler answered Johnny Swinger's open challenge and defeated him for the BCW Championship. As Brawler was not an active member of the BCW roster at the time Swinger had the decision overturned nullifying Brawler's reign and continuing Swinger's.	
17	D'Lo Brown	March 6, 2003	BCW March Breakdown	Oldcastle, Ontario	1	192		
18	Shane Douglas	September 14, 2003	BCW/IWF Belleville Bash	Belleville, Michigan	1	315		
—	Vacated	July 18, 2004	—	Belleville, Michigan	—	—	Douglas wasn't able to make the scheduled title defense and was stripped as a result.	
19	D'Lo Brown	July 18, 2004	N/A	Belleville, Michigan	2	147	Defeated Gangrel to win the vacant title.	
20	A-1	December 12, 2004	A Night of Appreciation for Sabu	Belleville, Michigan	1	222		
21	Bobby Roode	July 22, 2005	BCW WrestleFest 2005	Oldcastle, Ontario	1	55		
22	Abyss	September 15, 2005	BCW International Incident	Oldcastle, Ontario	1	303		
—	Vacated	July 15, 2006	—	Windsor, Ontario	—	—	Title vacated due to inactivity.	
23	Tyson Dux	March 28, 2009	BCW March Breakdown 2009	Windsor, Ontario	1	355	Dux won an 8-man Gauntlet Match. Other contenders in the match were Kiyoshi, Phil Atlas, Johnny Devine, Conrad Kennedy III, Derek Wylde, Joe Doering, and Petey Williams. The title was reinstated after going dormant during Abyss' reign. Dux then won a title unification match for the BCW, BSE, & NSP Championships, defeating Derek Wylde, on March 18, 2010 for Maximum Pro Wrestling.	
†	Robbie McAllister	April 11, 2010	MPW Spring Loaded	Woodstock, Ontario	1	6	Then known as the MPW Triple Crown Championship	
24	Tyson Dux	April 17, 2010	MPW Gold Rush	North Bay, Ontario	2	860	Defended the title under the MPW brand until the revival of BCW in 2012.	
25	Phil Atlas	August 24, 2012	CAN-AM Rising	Windsor, Ontario	1	728	Defeated Dux at a CAN-AM Rising event.	
26	Jon Bolen	August 22, 2014	CAN-AM Rising	Windsor, Ontario	1	645	Defeated Atlas at a CAN-AM Rising event with help from The Syndicate as Brad Martin joined forces with the group.	
27	Cody Deaner	May 28, 2016	BCW Spring Loaded 2016	Windsor, Ontario	1	332	After Bolen was unable to defend title due to injury, Deaner defeated Bobby Roode and Kongo Kong to win Interim Championship at Excellence 2015. Defeated Bolen on May 28, 2016 at Spring Loaded 2016 to become undisputed champion.	
28	Kongo Kong	March 25, 2017	BCW March Breakdown 2017	Windsor, Ontario	1	560	Won in a triple threat match including Billy Gunn.	
29	Cody Deaner	October 6, 2018	BCW 25th Anniversary Show	Windsor, Ontario	2	1,737	This was a Fatal 4 Way also including Matt Sydal and Johnny Impact.	
30	N8 Mattson	July 9, 2023	BCW at Essex Fun Fest	Windsor, Ontario	1	<1	Became the first-ever BCW Triple Crown Champion.	
31	Cody Deaner	July 9, 2023	BCW at Essex Fun Fest	Windsor, Ontario	3	90	Immediately invoked his rematch clause to regain the Championship.	
32	Jake Something	October 7, 2023	BCW 30th Anniversary Show	Windsor, Ontario	1	1131+		

== Combined reigns ==
As of November 11, 2026.

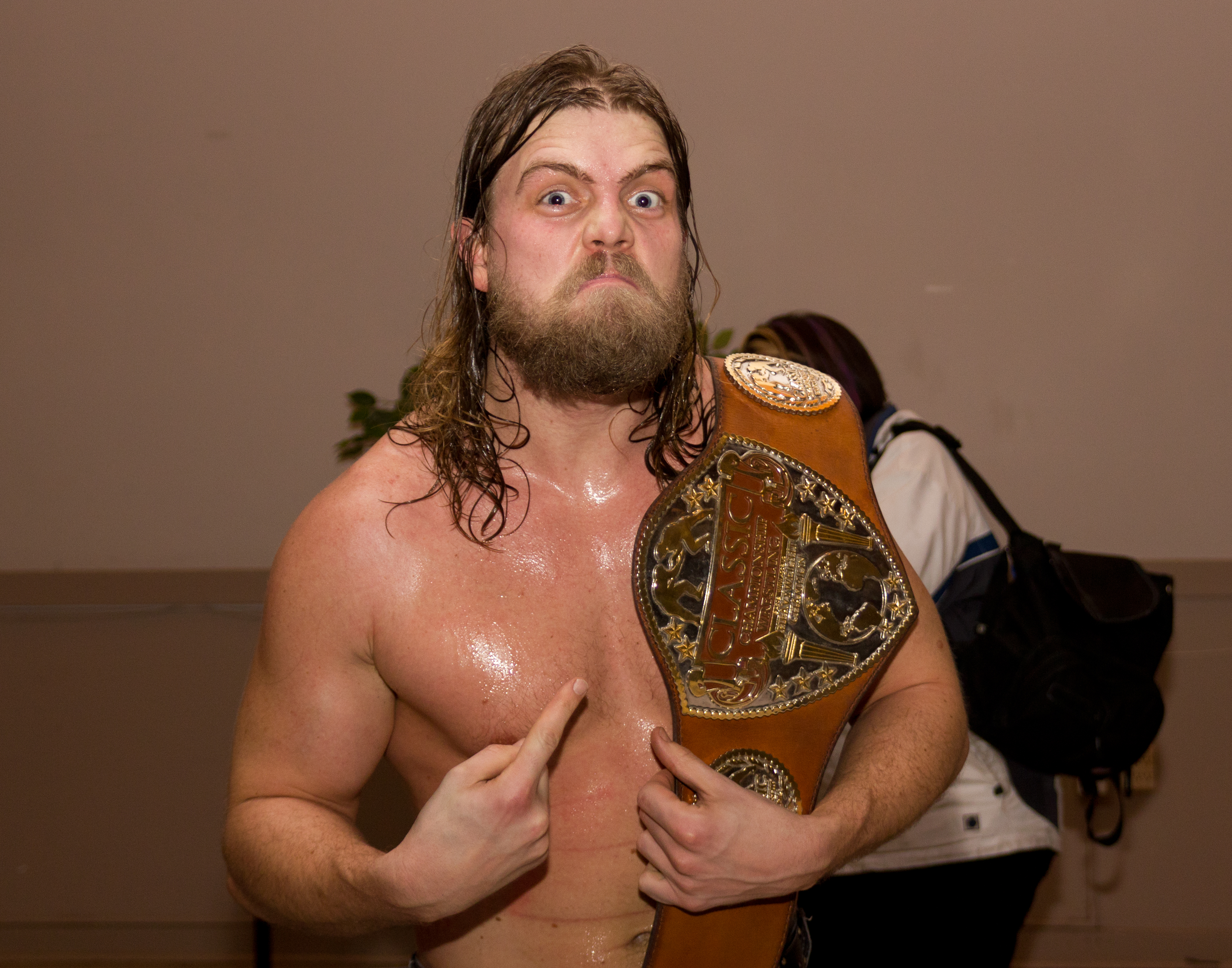
Three-time champion Cody Deaner

†	Indicates the current champion

Rank	Champion	No. of reigns	Combined days
1	Scott D'Amore	5	2,168
2	Cody Deaner	3	2,159
3	Tyson Dux	2	1,215
4	Jake Something†	1	1131+
5	Phil Atlas	1	728
5	Jon Bolen	1	645
7	Kongo Kong	1	560
8	Johnny Swinger	2	464
9	D'Lo Brown	2	339
10	Shane Douglas	1	315
11	Abyss	1	303
12	Mickey Doyle	2	302
13	Sabu	1	294
14	Canadian Patriot	1	265
15	A-1	1	222
16	Mikey Whipwreck	1	133
17	Denny Kass	1	85
18	Bobby Roode	1	55
19	Tommy Dreamer	1	42
20	Bruiser Bedlam	1	33
21	Rock Stevens	1	25
22	Robbie McAllister	1	6
23	Jake Steele	1	1
24	Nate Mattson	1	<1

== See also ==
- Professional wrestling in Canada
