= Jon Bolen =

American professional wrestler, bodybuilder

Personal information
- Born: Jonathan Bolen Uniontown, Pennsylvania, U.S.

Professional wrestling career
- Ring name(s): John Bolen; Jon Bolen; War Child
- Billed height: 5 ft 10 in (1.78 m)
- Billed weight: 220 lb (100 kg)
- Billed from: Wilkes-Barre, Pennsylvania; Erie, Pennsylvania
- Trained by: Scott D'Amore; Ohio Valley Wrestling
- Debut: October 16, 2004

Jonathan Bolen is an American professional wrestler and bodybuilder. He currently competes on the independent circuit including Maximum Pro Wrestling, the International Wrestling Cartel and the National Wrestling Alliance. After winning Total Nonstop Action Wrestling's "Gut Check Challenge" in 2004, he was briefly signed to the company before then signing a developmental contract with World Wrestling Entertainment and assigned to its developmental territories Ohio Valley Wrestling and Deep South Wrestling. While in Ohio Valley Wrestling, he was one half of High Dosage with "Silverback" Ryan Reeves.

== Early life ==
Born in Uniontown, Pennsylvania, Bolen became involved in weightlifting and football as a teenager. Attending California University of Pennsylvania, Bolen played football as a two-time All-Conference and All-American nose guard and two-time defensive captain. Although tearing three ligaments in his knee breaking his tibia and fibula, he spent only a year in rehab and continued playing during his senior year completing the season without missing a single game.

== Bodybuilding ==
After graduation, he continued bodybuilding and eventually set a state bench record in the 275 lb (125 kg). weight class at 670 lb (300 kg). At a state power lifting meet, he attempted to qualify for the Arnold Classic by benching 700 lb (320 kg). Although coming two inches of locking out the qualifying limit, he did manage to break his own record at 670 lb (300 kg). During the meet, he met former Gold's Gym Venice owner Ed Conners who had happened to be in town that evening to attend a bodybuilding show. During this meeting, Conners encouraged Bolen to participate in the "Gut Check Challenge", a talent recruitment event organized by Total Nonstop Action Wrestling in conjunction with TrimSpa as part of the Show of Strength Pro Championship weekend.

== Professional wrestling career ==
=== Total Nonstop Action Wrestling ===
Bolen accepted Conners' offer to fly him to Atlanta, Georgia and eventually won the "Gut Check Challenge" on October 16, 2004. The event saw entrants rated on the basis of their performance in five categories: "back bump", "mat techniques", "ring interviews", "running the ropes" and "squat challenge". The male and female events were won by Bolen and Jaime Dauncey respectively, with Bolen and Dauncey rewarded with a $4,000 USD cash prize and a subsequent appearance on TNA programming. During the next two months, he trained under Scott D'Amore for three hours a day and five days a week and began appearing at house shows after an 8-week period.

Bolen appeared several times in TNA during 2005, including an appearance at Turning Point on December 11, where he teamed with Buck Quartermain and Joe Doering in losing effort to Lance Hoyt and The Naturals (Andy Douglas and Chase Stevens) in a six-man tag team match. In later appearances, he was utilized as a preliminary wrestler during his later appearances with the promotion.

=== World Wrestling Entertainment ===
==== Ohio Valley Wrestling ====
Appearing on the undercard of the final episode of WWE Velocity, he and Sterling James Keenan had a WWE tryout match losing to Kid Kash and Jamie Noble. Bolen eventually signed a developmental contract with World Wrestling Entertainment in July 2006 and assigned to Ohio Valley Wrestling, a WWE developmental territory based in Louisville, Kentucky. On July 27, Bolen made his OVW debut losing to Elijah Burke at a house show. Two days later at an event at Six Flags Kentucky Kingdom, he teamed with Aaron Stevens, Rod Steel and Eddie Craven in an 8-man tag team match losing to Chet the Jet, Brent Albright, Cody Runnels and Shawn Osborne. On August 11, he participated in a 15-man battle royal which included Shawn Osborne, Elijah Burke, Eddie Craven III, Pat Buck, Mike Kruel, Shad Gaspard, Lennox Lightfoot, Ranger Milton, Neighborhoodie, Johnny Punch, Seth Skyfire, Rod Steele, Jack Bull, Los Locos (Ramón and Raúl) and The Untouchables (Deuce Shade and Dice Domino).

In September, Bolen formed a tag team with Ryan Reeves called High Dosage. On January 10, 2007, High Dosage received their first and only opportunity at Southern Tag Team Championship, which they lost to defending champions Cody Runnels and Shawn Spears. The team ended soon afterwards when Reeves was released from his WWE developmental contract on January 19, 2007.

On January 20, Bolen teamed up with Katie Lea to defeat Domino and Cherry in a mixed tag team match in Hillview, Kentucky. He would again team with Katie Lea in a handicap mixed tag team match against Cherry and Deuce 'n Domino on January 24. The following night, he and Ariel defeated Idol Stevens and Beth Phoenix. Bolen would remain in OVW only a brief time before his final television appearance in the promotion teaming with T.J. Dalton against Charles "The Hammer" Evans and Justin "The Ox" LaRoche on January 31.

==== Deep South Wrestling and departure ====
By mid-February, Bolen appeared in Deep South Wrestling, teaming with Shawn Osborne in a losing effort against Freakin' Deacon and G-Rilla on February 15. Defeating Heath Miller in a dark match several days later, Bolen continued to team with Osborne, although the two were less than successful. On March 16, he also lost to Kofi Kingston at a DSW event in Atlanta, Georgia. In his final appearance, he and Osborne defeated Robert Anthony and Johnny Curtis at the DSW Arena in McDonough, Georgia on April 5. Bolen was then released the following day.

=== Return to the independent circuit ===
On June 9, 2007, Bolen won the NWA Upstate Kayfabe Dojo Championship after defeating Colin Olsen, Cloudy and then-champion JP Black. Beginning in 2008, the Kayfabe Dojo Title was retired without Bolen ever having lost it. During the summer, he made his return to the International Wrestling Cartel, making a surprise appearance at the supercard Super Indy VI interfering on behalf of former Heavyweight Champion Ricky Reyes, who was being attacked by Dennis Gregory and Brent Albright. Although scheduled to face Albright the following month at Summer Sizzler 4: Checkmate, Albright was unable to make the event due to "travel issues" and Bolen instead faced Chris Hero, who he defeated.

At the 2007 Ellsworth Basebrawl, Bolen was to team with former tag team partner Sterling James Keenan against War Machine (Brent Albright and Sebastian Dark). However, Keenan ended up defeating Albright in an Ellsworth Street Fight after Bolen was unable to make the event due to travel issues.

After being seen at many IWC events in the past several months, Bolen made his official return at the Promotional Consideration Paid for by the Following championship tournament as a color commentator.

In March 2009, Bolen was featured on all three shows of the inaugural tour of Scott D'Amore's new promotion Maximum Pro Wrestling in Ontario.

In late 2013, Bolen began wrestling under the name "Warchild" as a part of Krimson's 'Dead Wrestling Society' stable.

=== Global Force Wrestling (2015, 2017) ===
Bolen debuted in the original Global Force Wrestling on July 10, 2015 during a GFW Grand Slam Tour event in Erie, Pennsylvania, teaming with Jamin Olivencia in a losing effort against Sonjay Dutt and Moose. The following night, Bolen defeated Olivencia in a singles match.

Following the merger of Total Nonstop Action Wrestling (then called Impact Wrestling) with GFW, Bolen began appearing in GFW Impact! losing against the likes of Alberto El Patron, Ethan Carter III, Mahabali Shera and in tag team action against LAX and OvE.

== Championships and accomplishments ==
- Border City Wrestling
  - BCW Heavyweight Championship (1 time)
  - BCW Tag Team Championship (1 time) – with Johnny Devine
- Championship Wrestling International
  - CWI Tag Team Championship (1 time) - with Guillotine Graham
  - CWI Tag Team Championship Tournament (2011)
- Midwest Pro Wrestling Alliance
  - MPWA Heavyweight Championship (1 time)
- NWA Upstate
  - NWA Upstate Kayfabe Dojo Championship (1 time)
- Pro Wrestling Illustrated
  - Ranked #425 of the top 500 singles wrestlers in the PWI 500 in 2006
- Pro Wrestling Rampage
  - PWR Tag Team Championship (2 times) – with Krimson
- Total Nonstop Action Wrestling
  - TNA Gut Check winner
