= Mat DuVall =

American bodybuilder and wrestler (1972–2013)

- Professional bodybuilder

Personal info
- Born: Matthew Thomas DuVall; 31 October 1972; Prince William County, Virginia, USA
- Died: 22 February 2013 (aged 40); Marietta, Georgia, USA

Best statistics
- Height: 5 ft 11.5 in (182 cm)
- Weight: 260 lb (118 kg)

Matthew Thomas DuVall (1972–2013) was an American professional bodybuilder and wrestler.

== Biography ==
DuVall was born in Prince William County in Virginia in 1972. He started competing in national bodybuilding competitions in 1992, when he placed third in the Heavyweight category of that year's NPC Teen Nationals competition.

DuVall was the overall winner of the 2003 NPC Nationals bodybuilding competition, which earned him his IFBB Pro Card, allowing him to compete as a professional bodybuilder. Between 2004 and 2007 he participated in three events, with his best place finish being 13th.

In April 2004, he appeared on the cover of Muscular Development magazine.

DuVall trained as a professional wrestler in 2005 at the CanAm wrestling school run by Scott D'Amore. Between 2005 and 2009, he wrestled with Border City Wrestling, winning seven of his eight matches.

In 2008, DuVall moved to Cobb County, Georgia, and later set up a fitness gym called American Body Works. DuVall died on February 22, 2013, at his home, aged 40.
