= Oldcastle, Ontario =

Unincorporated community in Tecumseh, Ontario, Canada

Coordinates: 42.2263°N 82.9581°W

- Interactive map of Oldcastle, Ontario
- Time zone: UTC-5 (Eastern (EST))
  - Summer (DST): UTC-4 (EDT)
- Postal code span: N0R
- Area code: (519)

Oldcastle is an unincorporated community in the town of Tecumseh, Ontario, Canada. It is bounded to the north by Highway 3, to the east by the Chrysler Canada Greenway trail, to the south by County Road 8 (Townline), and to the west by Howard Avenue. It is the starting point of the Chrysler Canada Greenway rail trail. Its western half consists primarily of industries and businesses, while the remaining area is farmland and residential.

== Business ==
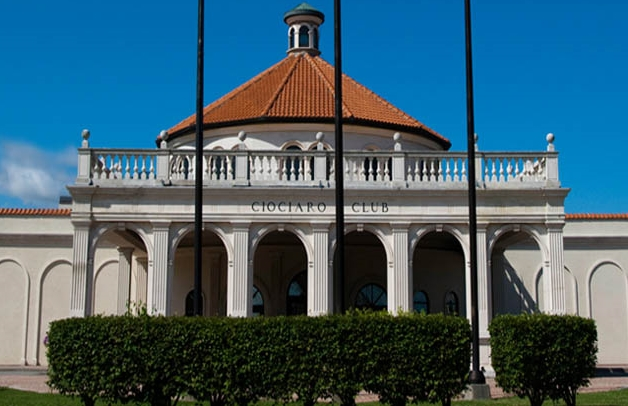
The Ciociaro Club in Oldcastle, Ontario

It is home to Ciociaro Club of Windsor, the largest Italian Club in Southwestern Ontario. The club sits on 71 acres (290,000 m^{2}) of land bordered by North Talbot Road and Oldcastle Road, including several baseball diamonds and soccer fields, and is encircled by a 1 kilometre (0.62 mi) cycling track.

== Wrestling ==
The community was known as a venue for Border City Wrestling from 1995 to 2005 and even hosted BCW Can-Am Tag Team Championship events with such notable wrestlers as Tommy Dreamer, Brooklyn Brawler, Johnny Swinger, Cyrus and Terry Taylor. Wrestling was held at the Ciociaro Club on North Talbot Road and drew as much as 1,000 people to the matches.

== Fibre Internet ==
In 2012 MNSi Telecom started installing optical fiber cable Internet service to Walkerville with a gradual roll-out of upgrades through to 2020. The Walkerville upgrade is part of an expected investment of more than $35 million. As of 2016, the service is available in Walkerville, Oldcastle, and East Windsor.

== Notable people ==
Oldcastle is the hometown of retired Winnipeg Jets forward Kyle Wellwood and his brother Eric who was a Philadelphia Flyers prospect.
