= Mickey Doyle (wrestler) =

American professional wrestler (born 1948)

Personal information
- Born: 24 June 1948 Detroit, Michigan, U.S.

Professional wrestling career
- Ring name(s): Mickey Doyle; Mickey Boyette; Mr. America; Piel Blanco
- Billed height: 5 ft 11 in (1.80 m)
- Billed weight: 222 lb (101 kg)
- Debut: 1970
- Retired: 2013

Mickey Doyle (born June 24, 1948), better known as 'Irish' Mickey Doyle is an American professional wrestler.

== Career ==
Doyle debuted in 1970 with Big Time Wrestling, before making appearances for several National Wrestling Alliance member promotions including Championship Wrestling from Florida, St. Louis Wrestling Club, Gulf Coast Championship Wrestling and NWA Hollywood Wrestling. He also made several appearances for All Japan Pro Wrestling and Maple Leaf Wrestling.

In 1984, he made appearances with the WWF, notably wrestling against David Schultz and Alexis Smirnoff.

== Championships and accomplishments ==
- NWA Hollywood Wrestling
  - NWA Americas Tag Team Championship (1 time, with Mando Lopez)
- Gulf Coast Championship Wrestling
- NWA United States Tag Team Championship (2 times with Mike Boyette as The California Hippies)
- World Wrestling Association
  - WWA World Tag Team Championship (1 time, with Al Snow as The Motor City Hitmen)
- Border City Wrestling
  - BCW Can-Am Heavyweight Championship (2 times)
- Global Wrestling Alliance
  - GWA Heavyweight Championship (1 time)
- UPW Pro Wrestling
  - UPW Heavyweight Championship (1 time)
