= Johnny Swinger =

American professional wrestler (born 1975)

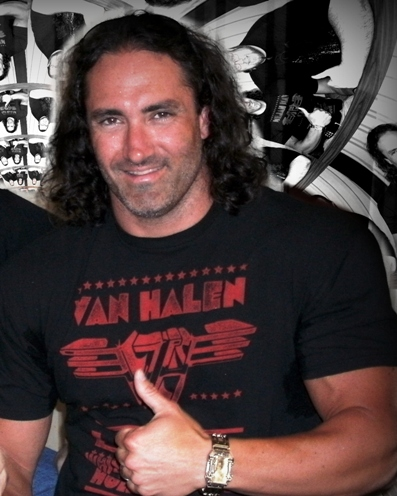
- Swinger in 2011

Personal information
- Born: Joseph Dorgan; July 3, 1975 (age 51) Niagara Falls, New York, U.S.
- Family: Tony Parisi (uncle)
- Website: http://swingtimewrestling.com

Professional wrestling career
- Ring name(s): Swing Man; Johnny Hollywood Swinger; Johnny Paradise; Johnny Parisi; Johnny Swinger; Swinger
- Billed height: 5 ft 10 in (1.78 m)
- Billed weight: 250 lb (110 kg)
- Billed from: Long Island, New York
- Trained by: Ron Hutchinson; Sweet Daddy Siki
- Debut: 1993

Joseph Dorgan (born July 3, 1975), better known the ring name Johnny Swinger, is an American professional wrestler. He performs on the independent circuit. He is best known for his time with Total Nonstop Action Wrestling (TNA).

== Professional wrestling career ==
=== Early career (1993–1995) ===
After training in Toronto, Ontario, Dorgan started wrestling on the independent circuit in 1993 as "Johnny Paradise". After he discovered that another wrestler was already using that name, he renamed himself "Johnny Hollywood Swinger" and began to make a name for himself as a villain in Scott D'Amore's "Syndicate" faction in Border City Wrestling.

=== World Championship Wrestling (1995) ===
Dorgan received his first national exposure when he appeared on World Championship Wrestling (WCW)'s show WCW Pro. Shortening his name to "Johnny Swinger", he lost to Chris Jericho on June 11 and Johnny B. Badd on the July 29 episode of Pro. On August 8 at a WCW Pro taping in Gainesville, Georgia, Swinger faced Dave Sullivan. Later that month he made an appearance on WCW's then-flagship program, WCW Saturday Night. Teaming with Terry Richards (later known as Rhyno), the young wrestler lost to the Nasty Boys in an episode that aired on September 16.

=== World Wrestling Federation (1995) ===
Eleven days later, Dorgan would work for the World Wrestling Federation going by his real name, Joe Dorgan, following in the footsteps of his uncle, Tony Parisi, who worked for the WWWF under Vince McMahon, Sr. Johnny Swinger appeared on WWFs flagship program, WWF RAW, facing Shane Douglas in a nationally televised broadcast on September 25, 1995. A day later, Dorgan would wrestle Hunter Hearst Helmsley at a WWF Superstars taping in Valparaiso, Indiana. On the October 30 edition of Raw, Dorgan would also get an opportunity to face Marty Jannetty.

=== Cleveland All Pro Wrestling (1996) ===
In April 1996, Dorgan joined Cleveland All Pro Wrestling, an independent promotion run by JT Lightning. He made his debut on April 13, 1996 at the CAPW Spring Slam, winning a battle royal and later challenging unsuccessfully for the vacated CAPW Junior Heavyweight Championship against Steve Nixon. On June 16 he defeated Bobby Blayze to win the CAPW North American Heavyweight Championship.

=== World Championship Wrestling (1996–1999) ===
Swinger returned to World Championship Wrestling on May 26, 1997 losing to the Giant in a three versus one match. Also on December 12, he wrestled Alex Wright on WCW Pro. He was utilized primarily on syndication & TBS programs, appearing on WCW Saturday Night and WCW WorldWide. Swinger also made appearances on both of the company's flagship programs Monday Nitro (on TNT) and Thunder (on TBS). His broadcast appearances include the highest rated Monday Nitro in July 1998, losing to Chavo Guerrero Jr. in front of a sold-out Georgia Dome; this same night, Goldberg defeated Hollywood Hogan for the WCW World Heavyweight Championship. Swinger remained in WCW for three years until joining Extreme Championship Wrestling.

=== Extreme Championship Wrestling (2000–2001) ===
Swinger joined ECW in 2000. He was placed in a tag team with Simon Diamond by booker Paul Heyman in May 2000 and shortened his name to "Swinger." He remained with ECW until it folded in April 2001.

=== Return to WCW (2001) ===
Swinger returned to WCW for one week for the Cruiserweight Tag Team Tournament. On the February 26, 2001 edition of Nitro where he and Jason Lee were defeated by Billy Kidman and Rey Mysterio Jr. He also wrestled on the February 28, 2001 edition of WCW Thunder where Swinger (accompanied by Jason Lee) lost to Shane Helms. Shortly after, WCW was purchased by the WWF and its programming ceased.

=== Border City Wrestling (2001–2002) ===
Following the closure of WCW, Swinger moved to Border City Wrestling. He made his debut on March 7, 2001, at an event in Oldcastle, Ontario, Canada and teamed with Otis Apollo to win the BCW Tag-Team Championship from Dyson Price and Geza Kalman Jr. They would lose the belts three months later to Nova and Tommy Dreamer. In the fall of 2001 he formed a new tag-team with Simon Diamond, and on November 27, 2001 in Oldcastle he would win an eight man gauntlet match against CW Anderson, Larry Destiny, Little Guido, Otis Apollo, Scott D'Amore, Simon Diamond, and Steve Corino and captured the BCW Can-Am Heavyweight Championship.

Swinger remained champion for the remainder of 2001 and through all of 2002, defending the title against Jerry Lawler, Bobby Rude, Chris Sabin, Gangrel, and Jerry Lynn. After a 464-day reign, he would finally lose the title to D-Lo Brown in Oldcastle on March 6, 2003.

=== World Wrestling All-Stars (2003) ===
Swinger had a brief stint in the earlier part of 2003 in the World Wrestling All-Stars promotion. The promotion featured primarily talents known from other wrestling promotions, boasting talents such as Bret Hart, Sting, Lex Luger, Jeff Jarrett, and others. Swinger's highest profile match in the promotion came on May 23, 2003, when he faced Chris Sabin, Frankie Kazarian, and Jerry Lynn in an inter-promotional match for the WWA International Cruiserweight and NWA-TNA X-Division Championships. Swinger also appeared and was victorious on World Wrestling All Stars International card "Retribution" in Glasgow Scotland, teaming with Buff "The Stuff" Bagwell to defeat Norman Smiley and Malice.

=== Total Nonstop Action Wrestling (2002–2005) ===
On July 24, 2002, Simon Diamond and Swinger debuted as a team in Total Nonstop Action Wrestling (TNA). They feuded with America's Most Wanted (Chris Harris and James Storm) for some time before winning the NWA World Tag Team Championships. The team split on February 18, 2004 when Swinger turned into a villain by pledging allegiance to Jeff Jarrett, and feuded with one another. Swinger eventually formed a stable known as "The New York Connection" with Glenn Gilbertti, Vito and Trinity.

=== World Wrestling Entertainment (2005–2006, 2007) ===
Dorgan signed a developmental deal with World Wrestling Entertainment (WWE) in 2005 and began training at Ohio Valley Wrestling (OVW) in May 2005. He made his WWE debut on the July 31, 2005 episode of Sunday Night Heat as "Johnny Parisi" winning his debut match for the company. He was a main stay on Heat. His ring name was derived from his great uncle Tony Parisi.

In September 2005, Parisi was sent to Deep South Wrestling wrestling there for two months while also wrestling on Sunday Night Heat, until being taken off of television in November due to an injury. He came back in December 2005, but was sent back to DSW. He worked two more Heat matches for WWE in February 2006, losing competitively to Chavo Guerrero and Kane. He was released on June 29, 2006.

He returned to WWE to face Ron Simmons in a match on WWE Heat on October 14, 2007.

=== Return to the independent circuit (2006–2019) ===
After being released from the WWE he went back to wrestling on the independent circuit mainly wrestling for Great Championship Wrestling (GCW). He has great title success there winning the GCW Heavyweight title on 2 occasions and the GCW Tag Titles twice, once with Glenn Gilberti and once with Bull Buchanan. Raven came to GCW to help Swinger with his feud against Michaels Inc. in December 2006. After winning the GCW title from Chris Stevens, Swinger turned on Raven and joined Michaels Inc. In January 2007, Swinger began challenging TNA wrestlers to try to come to challenge him in GCW. In response to this, TNA Director of Authority, Jim Cornette came to a GCW show to confront Swinger. Swinger and Bull Buchanan were defeated by Raven and David Young on January 31. Afterwards, David Young challenged Swinger for the GCW title. He later lost the title to Scotty Beach in a steel cage match via submission. On September 15, he defeated Scotty Beach for the GCW title once again. On September 29 he faced Bull Buchanan in a losing effort within a steel cage at the fourth-annual Fred Ward Memorial Show. He appeared for TNA's flagship pay-per-view, Bound for Glory, competing in a dark match with Joey Matthews against The Motor City Machineguns. Swinger recaptured the GCW Heavyweight Championship from Bull Buchanan on December 15, 2007, in a triple threat match that also included another TNA veteran, Sonny Siaki. Swinger spent most of 2008 fighting off challenges of various contenders for the GCW Championship, including Scotty 2 Hotty, Disco Inferno, and Bull Buchanan.

On July 29, 2010, it was confirmed that Swinger would take part in TNA's ECW reunion show Hardcore Justice on August 8. At the event Swinger, Simon Diamond and Kid Kash were defeated by Little Guido, Tony Luke and Tracy Smothers of The Full Blooded Italians in a six-man tag team match.

In 2011, Johnny Swinger continued success for Peachstate Wrestling Alliance in Georgia, feuding with Bill the Butcher, Ultimate Dragon, and others. Swinger continues to be one of the most popular babyfaces in the organization, despite spending the majority of his career as a heel. He is also currently training pro wrestlers and hopefuls with Rick Steiner at Hard Knocks Gym in Kennesaw, Georgia.

In 2017, Johnny Swinger started to co-host The Raven Effect podcast on Podcast One with fellow pro wrestler Raven; however after a couple of weeks, he was replaced by comedian and former WCW employee Buttsby Berkeley, and backyard wrestler Joseph Feeney due to poor ratings.

=== Return to Impact Wrestling / TNA (2019–2024) ===
In 2019, Swinger re-signed with TNA, now known as Impact Wrestling. He debuted on the September 27, 2019 episode of Impact Wrestling. After a brief feud with Petey Williams establishing himself as a villainous character with the gimmick of an out-of-touch 80's wrestler, Swinger would proceed to get beaten by Ken Shamrock. After this match with Shamrock, Swinger would briefly reunite with former tag team partner Glenn Gilbertti. From there, Swinger would force himself into a temporary tag team informally known as the Mack and Pack Connection with Willie Mack on the February 19, 2020 episode of Impact. After Mack won the X Division Championship, Chris Bey would inform Swinger of Mack's disdain for Swinger, leading to a match between the two, which was won by Mack. After losing the contest Swinger engaged in post-match beatdown. Swinger started to manage and team with Bey.

On the July 28 episode of Impact!, Swinger joined a bunch of wrestlers in the reality show Wrestle House. The following week, he lost against Alisha Edwards and Susie in a mixed gender handicap match. During Night 2 of Emergence, Swinger lost to Crazzy Steve in a Blindfold match, and had to dress like him the next week. On the September 1 episode of Impact!, he and the rest of the Wrestle House cast returned to the Impact Zone during Knockouts Champion Deonna Purrazzo's Black Tie Affair. In November, Swinger was accused by Tommy Dreamer for shooting John E. Bravo and was found with a gun in his fanny pack. He was taken to Wrestler's Court to defend himself and it was revealed that Larry D (as his alter-ego "Lawrence D") shot Bravo for taking Rosemary away from him.

In early 2021, Swinger established "Swinger's Palace", an underground casino in the Impact Zone, which was used as a location for feuds to play out, having John E. Bravo (whom he consistently called Dino) as his pit boss and Hernandez as his bouncer. The casino was shut down by Scott D'Amore on the September 30, 2021 episode of Impact! after Swinger nonchalantly admitted that he didn't have a license from the Tennessee Gaming Commission. In October, Swinger entered a tournament to determine the inaugural Impact Digital Media Champion, where he was defeated by eventual tournament winner Jordynne Grace in the first round. At Bound for Glory, he participated in the Call Your Shot Gauntlet match, where the winner could choose any championship match of their choice, but was eliminated by The Demon. On the November 25 episode of Impact!, Swinger joined a bunch of wrestlers in the reality show Wrestle House 2, where he was brought in to be cheered up, per Bravo's request. He lost to Downtown Daddy Brown (Willie Mack's throwback gimmick) in a grudge match but was able to beat Larry D in his "Lawrence D" alter-ego, winning the affection of Swingerella 1 and her hand in marriage. During the wedding, it was revealed that Bravo slept with Swingerella 1 to not be a virgin and escape the deal he made with Rosemary.

In 2022, with Impact resuming full time touring and no longer having a set location for Swinger's Palace, Swinger switched his focus to being a mentor for Zicky Dice, training him as part of his "Swinger's Dungeon" wrestling school.

Johnny Swinger was removed from the TNA (Total Nonstop Action) Wrestling official roster page in March 2024.

== Personal life ==
Dorgan is the nephew of wrestler Tony Parisi, who died from an aneurysm on August 19, 2000, at the age of 59.

Dorgan and his wife, Meghan, have two daughters and one son.

== Championships and accomplishments ==
- American Premier Wrestling
  - APW Tag Team Championship (1 time) - with Antonio
- Border City Wrestling
  - BCW Can-Am Heavyweight Championship (2 times)
  - BCW Can-Am Tag Team Championship (2 times) – with Scotty Summers and Otis Apollo
- Cleveland All-Pro Wrestling
  - CAPW North American Heavyweight Championship (1 time)
- Elite Wrestling Federation
  - EWF Tag Team Championship (1 time) – with Scott D'Amore
- Georgia Championship Wrestling / Great Championship Wrestling
  - GCW Heavyweight Championship (6 times)
  - GCW Tag Team Championship (2 times) – with Glenn Gilberti (1) and Bull Buchanan (1)
- Lariato Pro Wrestling
  - W4CC Championship (1 time, current)
- Maximum Pro Wrestling
  - MXPW Tag Team Championship (1 time) – with Simon Diamond
- Mid Atlantic Championship Wrestling
  - MACW Heavyweight Championship (1 time)
  - MACW Junior Heavyweight Championship (1 time)
- Motor City Wrestling
  - MCW Tag Team Championship (2 times) – with Johnny Paradise
- NWA Main Event
  - NWA Mid-America Heavyweight Championship (1 time)
- Peachstate Wrestling Alliance
  - PWA Heritage Championship (2 times)
  - PWA Southern Cruiserweight Championship (1 time)
  - PWA Tag Team Championship (1 time) - with Rick Michaels
- Pro Wrestling Illustrated
  - Ranked No. 447 of the top 500 singles wrestlers in the PWI 500 in 2021
- Total Nonstop Action Wrestling/Impact Wrestling
  - NWA World Tag Team Championship (1 time) – with Simon Diamond
  - Gravy Train Turkey Trot (2023) – with Jake Something, Mike Bailey, and PCO
- Universal Championship Wrestling
  - UCW World Championship (1 time)
- Universal Independent Wrestling
  - UIW Heavyweight Championship (1 time, final)
