= Highlanders (professional wrestling) =

Professional wrestling tag team

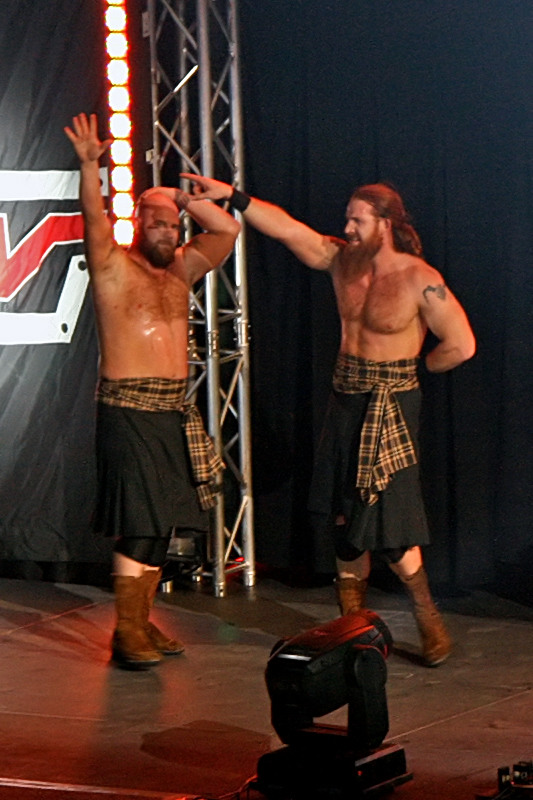
- Rory (left) and Robbie McAllister in 2007

Tag team
- Members: Robbie McAllister; Rory McAllister
- Name(s): Highlanders; Scottish Highlanders
- Billed heights: 6 ft 0 in (1.83 m) – Rory; 6 ft 3 in (1.91 m) – Robbie
- Combined billed weight: 488 lb (221 kg; 34.9 st)
- Hometown: Oban, Scotland
- Billed from: Oban, Scotland
- Debut: 2000
- Disbanded: 18 January 2014; 14 December 2019
- Years active: 2000–2014; 2019
- Trained by: Waldo Von Erich

The Highlanders were a Scottish professional wrestling tag team consisting of storyline cousins Robbie McAllister (Derek Graham-Couch) (born 20 September 1974) and Rory McAllister (Russell Murray) (born 28 March 1976) who were best known for wrestling for World Wrestling Entertainment on the Raw brand.

== History ==
Couch and Murray were both born and raised in Oban, Scotland, where the team was billed from. Couch was born on 20 September 1974 and Murray was born on 28 March 1976.

Couch first started going to a wrestling school at the behest of co-worker at CAMI Automotive, Inc. where he met future tag team partner Murray. The two were trained by Waldo Von Erich at the Von Erich/Hart Brothers School of Wrestling.

=== Independent circuit (2001–2005) ===
They debuted in 2001, and the two men began wrestling as the team Highlanders with promotions such as GLCW, PWA and NSPW, which ran shows in Ontario, Canada. They also had longtime feud with another team out of the Ontario indy scene known as the Texas Hell-Razors which lasted for over 2 years. They also worked dark matches for WWE since 2003 and debuted on Heat in a losing effort against Tajiri and Rhyno on 26 July 2004. The team's last independent match before signing to WWE, was for PWA against Andrew Davis and Phil Latio in Cambridge, Ontario.

=== World Wrestling Entertainment (2005–2008) ===
==== Ohio Valley Wrestling (2005–2006) ====
In July 2005, they signed a developmental deal with World Wrestling Entertainment and were assigned to their "farm territory" Ohio Valley Wrestling (OVW) where they wrestled for several months.

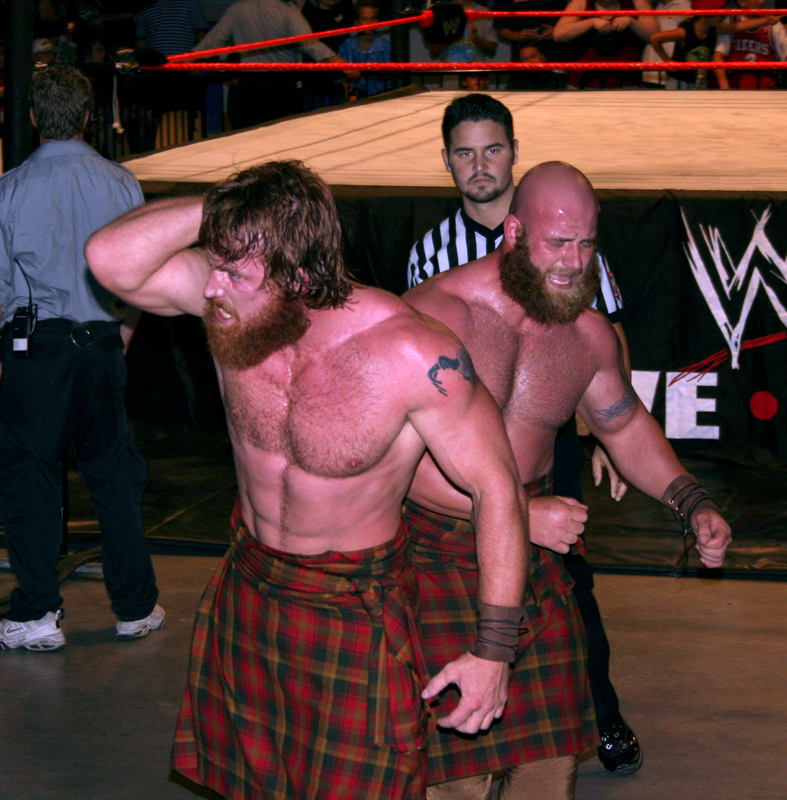
Robbie (left) and Rory McAllister leaving the ring after a match

In June 2006 vignettes began airing on Raw featuring The Highlanders exploring "the big city" and comparing the differences to their native Scotland in classic Fish Out Of Water style.

==== Raw (2006–2008) ====
The Highlanders made their Raw debut on 3 July, with a victory over the duo of Matt Striker and Rob Conway. They followed this victory with another over the same team and were put on the fast track to a match for the Spirit Squad's Tag Team titles. When they were granted a match against Spirit Squad members Kenny and Mikey, The Highlanders were defeated after abundant interference by the other members. Throughout the month of August, The Highlanders continued to battle different tag teams until they won a Triple Threat tag team match over the team of Charlie Haas and Viscera and Lance Cade and Trevor Murdoch, which made them the number one contenders to the Spirit Squad's title on the 4 September edition of Raw. They were unsuccessful in winning the title at Unforgiven, again because of interference from Spirit Squad members not technically a part of the match.

The Highlanders went on to lose a Texas Tornado match at Cyber Sunday and a Tag Team Turmoil match at New Year's Revolution for a future tag title shot. In-between the pay-per-views, The Highlanders briefly feuded with Lance Cade and Trevor Murdoch, both teams exchanging wins on Heat before ending the feud on the 4 December episode of Raw, defeating Cade and Murdoch in a Roddy Piper tribute match.

In late 2006, they mostly competed on Raw's sister show Heat, occasionally making appearances on Raw, throughout 2007, primarily to job to other teams or singles wrestlers such as Snitsky. On the 24 September 2007 episode of Raw, The Highlanders interrupted a match between Paul London and Brian Kendrick and Lance Cade and Trevor Murdoch, due to The Highlanders getting tired of being held back from a World Tag Team Championship opportunity, thus the duo turning heel. Nothing came of this turn, however, as they lost a number one contenders match on 12 November. They then feuded with London and Kendrick and Jim Duggan and Super Crazy, mainly on Heat.

The Highlanders had a Royal Rumble qualifying match, but lost to the team of Mick Foley and Hornswoggle.

The Highlanders only appeared once on ECW before Rory tore his pectoral muscle and was sidelined for six months in February 2008. They lost to then WWE Tag Team champions John Morrison and the Miz. Robbie started wrestling on Raw again during this time, mostly on Heat and also formed a brief tag team with Charlie Haas during this time. Robbie also made an appearance on the 17 March episode of Raw as a part of the Raw roster taking on John Cena and Randy Orton. Robbie was the fourth man to be pinned, when Cena pinned him after a flying leg drop.

In their last televised match on 11 August 2008 they were defeated by Cryme Tyme. Both members of the team were released from WWE on 15 August 2008.

=== Return to independent circuit (2008–2019) ===
In September 2008, Rory and Robbie returned to the Independent wrestling scene appearing mostly in single matches all over the U.S. and Canada, as well as Europe. In April 2010 they became the CWI tag team champs in Ontario Canada. Also in 2010, Robbie became the MPW Ontario heavyweight champion by defeating Tyson Dux. In August 2011 Highlander Robbie appeared on the CWI east coast tour with his hair cut short and beard shaved off and announced he was no longer Highlander Robbie McAllister and from that point on he was to be known as Robert Graham.

The Highlanders reunited on 19 January 2013 at the WAR X - 10th Anniversary show in Lima, Ohio. The two would reunite again at WAR 11th Anniversary on 18 January 2014.

In December 2019 they reunited and fought in two tag team matches together at the Battle On The Border Christmas shows, during which they won the Battle On The Border Tag Team Championships. They never defended the titles however, with the titles remaining inactive. They were eventually vacated in September 2021, with the duo having technically reigned as Champions for 637 days.

== Personal life ==
Murray, a graduate of Clemson University, now works in aviation management and is a single father raising his son, Ian and a daughter, Sophia. Rory makes limited wrestling appearances and is signed to Think Ink Signatures out of New York. In his spare time Rory can be found boxing or doing canvas painting. Rory now resides in a rural area outside of Cincinnati, Ohio.

Robbie married Rhonda in 2003, and they have a son named Treyton, born on 27 April 1996.

The Highlanders both have Scottish designed tattoos, of which some represent their families.

On the live, 27 March 2008 episode of TNA Impact!, Robbie was in attendance at the Impact Zone and was shown on camera (under his real name). This reportedly had a WWE official calling him and ordering that he leave immediately, which he did. The event was days prior to WrestleMania weekend when both companies were in the Orlando area. Robbie lost his $5,000 WrestleMania paycheck due to the appearance. Robbie later said in an interview that "I was very unhappy in WWE, and in retrospect I think it was kind of my way to get fired."

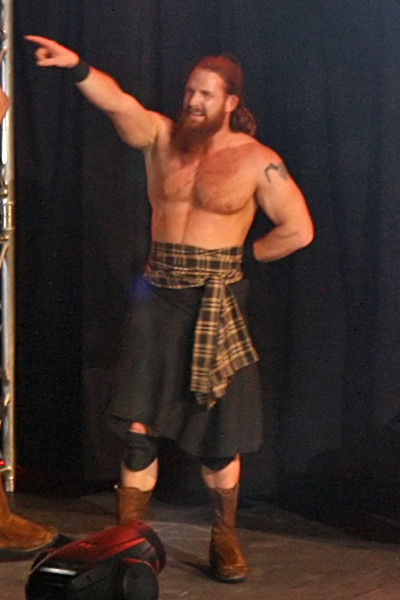
Robbie signals to the crowd

== Championships and accomplishments ==
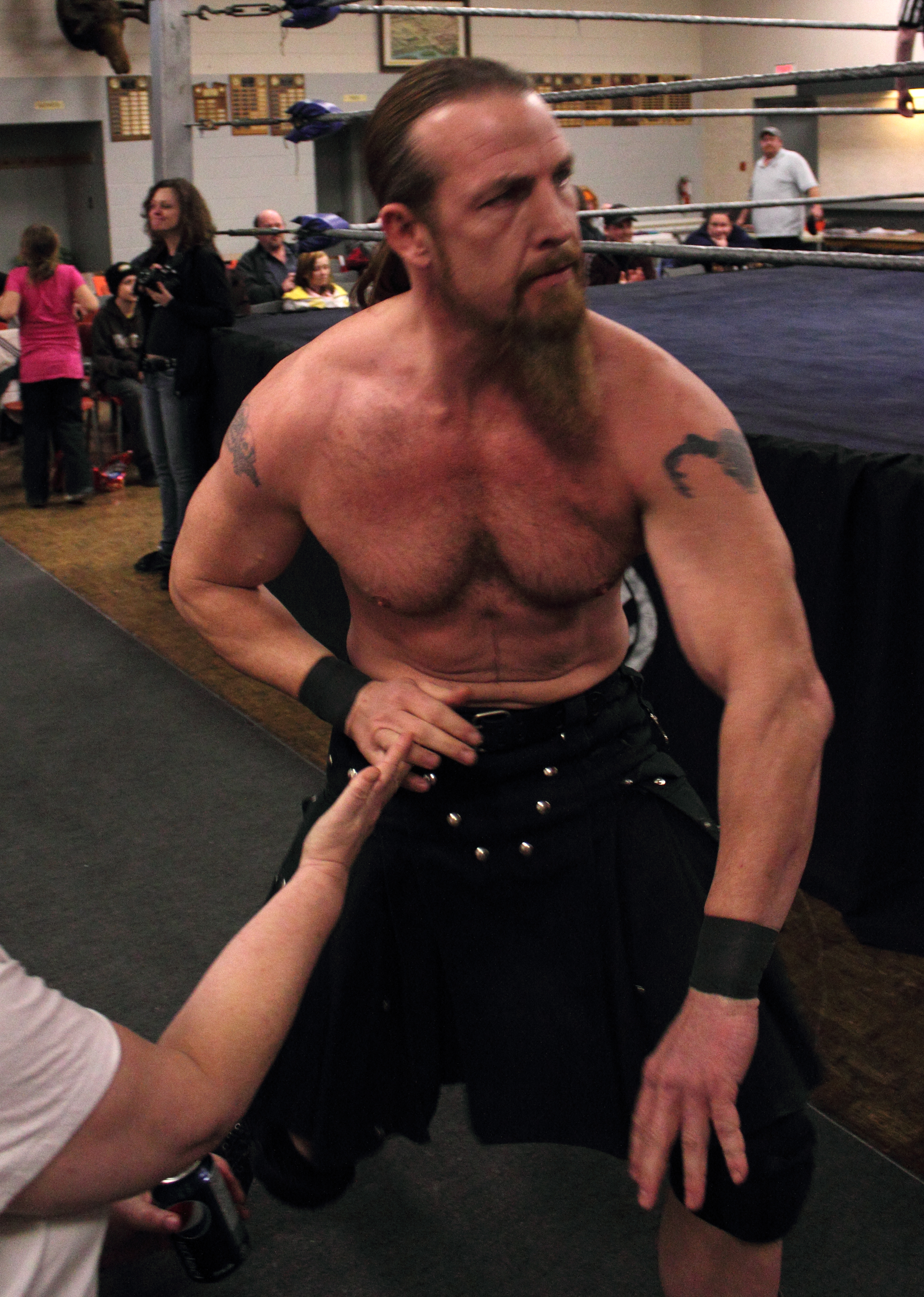
Robbie McAllister in January 2011

- Battle On The Border
  - Battle On The Border Tag Team Championship (1 time)

Kayfabe Conquest Heavyweight champion (1 time) Rory

- Border City Wrestling
  - BCW Can-Am Heavyweight Championship (1 time) – Robbie
- Championship Wrestling International
  - CWI Tag Team Championships (1 time)
- Great Canadian Wrestling
  - GCW Canadian Championship (1 time) – Robbie
- Legend City Wrestling
  - LCW Heavyweight Championship (1 time) – Robbie
- Maximum Pro Wrestling

- MaxPro Triple Crown Championship (1 time) – Robbie

- Pro Wrestling Illustrated
  - PWI ranked Robbie #168 of the best 500 singles wrestlers in the PWI 500 in 2006
  - PWI ranked Rory #176 of the best 500 singles wrestlers in the PWI 500 in 2006
- TWA Powerhouse
  - TWA Championship (1 time) – Robbie
