= Tyrant Eric Dawson =

Canadian professional wrestler

Personal information
- Born: Ian Prindible; June 22, 1976 (age 50) Peterborough, Ontario, Canada
- Spouse: Melissa Dauncey (divorced)
- Children: 2

Professional wrestling career
- Ring name(s): The Tyrant; Eric Dawson; Tyrant Eric Dawson
- Billed height: 6 ft 0 in (1.83 m)
- Billed weight: 244 lb (111 kg)
- Billed from: Fort Worth, Texas
- Trained by: Shane Sewell
- Debut: 1998

Ian Prindible is a Canadian professional wrestler. He is best known for being one half of the tag team known as the Texas Hell-Razors as Tyrant Eric Dawson with the Outlaw Scott Chase. The team was managed for over a year by former ROH, NWA, and TNA Impact wrestling knockout Angelina Love, who was known at the time as Angel Williams. They also had a two-year feud with former WWE tag team the Highlanders on the Independent wrestling circuit all over the U.S. and Canada before Robbie and Rory went to the WWE.

== History ==
In 1996 Dawson was working out at a local gym in Peterborough when he was introduced to Sean Morley (who later became Val Venis in WWE). At the time, Morley was in a tag team called the Canadian Glamor Boys with Shane Sewell. The team had made a name for itself in Puerto Rico. Dawson asked Morley about training and breaking into wrestling. Dawson was given a phone number to contact Jason Sterling, who was the son of the Missing Link Dewey Robertson. Dawson called the number and never got a response. Then he found out about a wrestling school in the Hamilton, Ontario area that was run by Leighton Morrison. Morrison claimed to have been trained by Dewey Robertson. Dawson went there and trained for a few weeks then Morrison told him it was gonna be $5,000 to keep on training at his school. In 1997 Dawson ran into Shane Sewell at the gym and told him about his Morrison experience. Sewell told him he had taken a break from wrestling and was needing to get back into ring shape and that someone else at the gym had asked him about training as well. Sewell then explained that he would be willing to help him and this other person start their training if he could find a place with a ring. Sewell found a place in Burlington, Ontario known as the RWA wrestling school/promotion. Sewell, Dawson and the other person (which turned out to be Bobby Roode) went to the RWA school 2 times a week. Dawson had his first match for RWA under the name the Mercenary in London Ontario against Robin Knightwing from the tag team known as the All knighters. He was then put into a tag team called the Mayham Patrol as the Mercenary which was a military gimmick. After a few months Dawson went to the RWA promoter and told him he wanted out of the military gimmick and had his own idea for a new name and image. Dawson then became the Tyrant Eric Dawson and embarked on a singles career wrestling for many independent wrestling promotions all over Canada and the U.S. At this point Dawson wrestled mostly singles matches as a bad guy(heel) and was put together with other singles wrestlers for the odd tag match. Which led to a feud with JQ Publik who was at the time one of the best good guys (baby face) in the Ontario indy wrestling circuit. In 1999 he became one half of the Texas Hell-Razors. In 2002 Dawson became the first ever GLCW champion in Hamilton Ontario after the new promotion held a title tournament, two months later he lost the title to Flexx Falcone.

In 2009 his longtime on again-off again feud with JQ Publik started up again.

Tyrant Eric Dawson has stated in interviews that his childhood hero and biggest influence that made him want to become a pro wrestler was WWE hall of famer Barry Windham.

== The Texas Hell-Razors ==
Dawson, seeing the lack of tag teams on the independent wrestling circuit, began looking for a full-time tag partner. At the same time JQ Publik started tagging up with Reggie Marley as the Ebony Express. In 1999 Dawson met Pat Murphy on a CWI show who was wrestling at the time under the name Pretty Boy Pat. They were put together for the show to work a tag team match. Dawson and Murphy had good chemistry as a team right away. So Dawson convinced Murphy to team with him as the Texas Hell-Razors. Within the same week Dawson was wrestling on a HWF show and met backstage a newcomer who was brought in to be a possible valet. Her name was Lauren Williams. During the show the HWF promoter put her with another wrestler as a valet and she was announced as Angel. The next night on another HWF show Dawson chatted to the wrestler about his new valet and found out it was not gonna be a long term thing. After the show Dawson gave Angel a ride to the next town for another HWF show the next day. After chatting with her he learned that she was very serious and sincere about getting into the wrestling business compared to most girls that hang out backstage. Dawson approached Angel about working with him as a valet. Dawson, Murphy, and their manager Angel Williams began appearing as kind of a trio rather than just a regular tag team to help them stand out. Murphy changed his name to Mercenary Scott Chase to have more of a Texas name, later he dropped the Mercenary name and replaced it with the Outlaw. They began to feud right away with the Ebony Express. In 2001 Dawson and Chase split up as a team due to conflict after a match where they ended up in a real fist fight in the dressing room thus causing them not to speak for couple months. During this time Angel Williams started her in ring training to wrestle. She never returned as their valet. Dawson and Chase then began to feud with the Highlanders until they left for the WWE. In 2004 Chase started wrestling more single matches since Dawson wanted to be at home more after the birth of his twin daughters. Also in 2004 Dawson suffered a knee injury in a match in Brantford Ontario. After knee injury he wrestled with Scott Chase as a team for a few different promotions but Dawson had nagging injuries as well as a none wrestling job and wanting to be with his family led to only a few shows a year until 2008 where they tagged together a few times. In April 2010 Dawson and Chase again teamed for the first time in a few years to face one of their longtime rivals The Highlanders Rory and Robbie.

== Book ==
In 2005 Dawson was featured with many other wrestlers in the book Wrestling's Underbelly from bingo halls to shopping malls, By James Vanderlinden.

== Personal life ==
In 1999 he lost his father John Prindible to cancer.
Prindible and his ex Melissa Dauncey had twin daughters Emily and Haily in 2004. They divorced in 2008.
Prindible was seen in September 2008 at the TNA Impact wrestling PPV talking with his old manager Angelina Love.
Prindible also played high school football against WWE wrestler Bobby Roode.
In 2009 Prindible was going through pre-op for knee and ankle surgery.

In Feb 2019 Prindible lost 90% of his vision in one of his eyes due to a damaged eye retina.
