= Tyson Dux =

Canadian wrestler (born 1978)

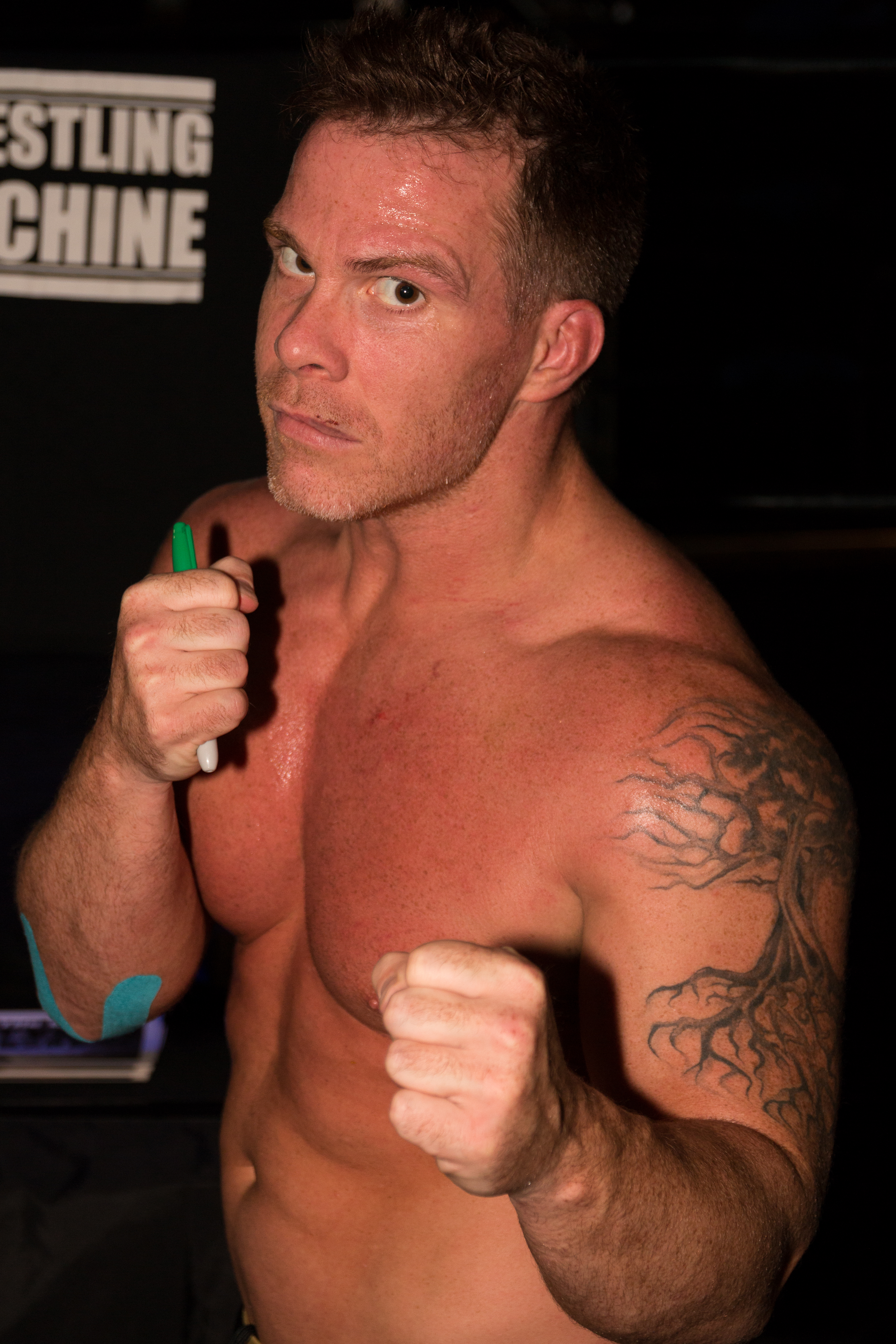
- Dux at an indy wrestling show in November 2015

Personal information
- Born: Tyson Moody; June 19, 1978 (age 48) Miramichi, New Brunswick, Canada
- Spouse: Lisa Marie Moody (m. 2016)

Professional wrestling career
- Billed height: 5 ft 10 in (1.78 m)
- Billed weight: 193 lb (88 kg)
- Trained by: Scott D'Amore; Joe E. Legend; Terry Taylor
- Debut: 1997
- Retired: 2022

Tyson Moody (born June 19, 1978), known by his ring name Tyson Dux (/duːks/ DOOKS), is a retired Canadian professional wrestler.

== Professional wrestling career ==
=== Independent circuit (1997–2022) ===
Dux trained under Scott D'Amore, Joe E. Legend and Terry Taylor and debuted in 1997 at the age of 18 in the International Championship Wrestling promotion. He was initially known by the ring name "Muay Thai Kid", with a gimmick that saw him don red karate pants and shave off his hair and eyebrows, before switching to the name Tyson Dux. Dux was asked to participate in the East Coast Wrestling Association's 2004 Super 8 Tournament, a tournament highlighting prominent cruiserweights on the independent circuit. However, he was forced to pull out of the tournament on March 31, 2004 after tearing his anterior cruciate ligament while wrestling Mark Jindrak on an episode of Velocity. Dux went on to take part in the 2005 Super 8 Tournament on April 9, 2005, losing to J.J. Perez in the first round.

Dux wrestled for numerous Canadian independent promotions, most prominently BSE Pro and Border City Wrestling. He joined the American Total Nonstop Action Wrestling promotion in April 2006 as a member of Team Canada in the 2006 World X Cup.

He wrestled in Blood, Sweat & Ears, Living Legends Wrestling (LLW), Prime Time Wrestling (PWT), Northwest Ohio Wrestling (NOW) and New Vision Pro Wrestling (NVP).

On September 20, 2009, Dux was defeated by Mr. Anderson at the inaugural Defiance Wrestling Federation show in Barrie, Ontario. This was Mr. Anderson's first match since leaving WWE.

When BSE Pro and Border City Wrestling merged in the beginning of 2010 to form Maximum Pro Wrestling, Dux, at the time the BCW Can-Am Heavyweight Champion, defeated Derek Wylde on March 18 to merge the title with NSP Grand Independent titles, BSE's Suicide Six Pack Championship, which he won from Xtremo, and become the first MaxPro Triple Crown Champion. On April 11 he lost the title to Robbie McAllister. Dux regained the Triple Crown championship on April 17 in North Bay, Ontario.

In September 2010, Dux debuted for the Japanese promotion Pro Wrestling Zero1 losing to Masato Tanaka. Dux later took part in the Tenkaichi Jr. tournament being eliminated in the second round after losing to Munenori Sawa. Dux teamed with the likes of Hikaru Sato, Sonjay Dutt and Takuya Sugawara on several occasions before leaving the company.

On May 26, 2017, at What Culture Pro Wrestling's Pro Wrestling World Cup - Canadian Qualifying Round, Dux was defeated by Kyle O'Reilly in the First Round of the Canada Leg.

=== World Wrestling Entertainment / WWE (2002–2005; 2007; 2014; 2016) ===
Between 2002 and 2004, Dux made several appearances with World Wrestling Entertainment on Heat and Velocity. He appeared in an angle on an episode of SmackDown in 2003 that saw him pose as a security guard who was attacked by The Undertaker, and in 2005, he wrestled in dark matches at Raw and SmackDown tapings. On 28 May 2007, Dux made an appearance for WWE in a match for Saturday Night's Main Event XXXIV in which he was defeated by Chuck Palumbo.

On 8 June 2014, Dux returned to WWE for a dark match prior to Friday Night's Smackdown in Ottawa, Ontario, Canada, where he was defeated by Sin Cara. Dux was named as a participant in the Cruiserweight Classic in the spring of 2016. The tournament kicked off on 23 June with Dux being eliminated in his first round match by Zack Sabre Jr.

=== Total Nonstop Action Wrestling / Impact Wrestling (2006; 2008; 2017–2019) ===
Dux debuted in TNA in April 2006 as a member of Team Canada in the 2006 World X Cup and at Sacrifice, Dux competed in the World X Cup Gauntlet match which was won by Petey Williams.

On June 12, 2008, Dux returned to TNA and was confirmed as a member of Team International for the TNA 2008 World X Cup Tournament. On the June 19 episode of Impact!, Dux and Daivari lost to Alex Shelley and Chris Sabin, at Victory Road, Dux competed in a four-team twelve man elimination tag team match with Alex Koslov and Doug Williams; the match was won by Team TNA.

Dux returned to Impact Wrestling at Bound for Glory, where Dux lost to Taiji Ishimori.

On the November 30, 2017 episode of Impact!, Dux lost to Matt Sydal.

=== Ring of Honor (2009–2010; 2014–2015) ===
On July 25, 2009 Dux made his debut in Ring of Honor in a losing effort against Tyler Black as a replacement for Nigel McGuinness, who was injured from the previous night. In May 2010, Dux began wrestling for the Ring of Honor promotion, marking his return to the national wrestling scene.

=== Hard Knocks Wrestling Academy (2021–2023) ===
In 2021, Tyson took the role of Head Coach and Lead Trainer at Hard Knocks Wrestling Academy in Listowel, Ontario, Canada where he continued to train the young and up and coming talent of the wrestling industry.Hard Knocks closed in 2023.

== In other media ==
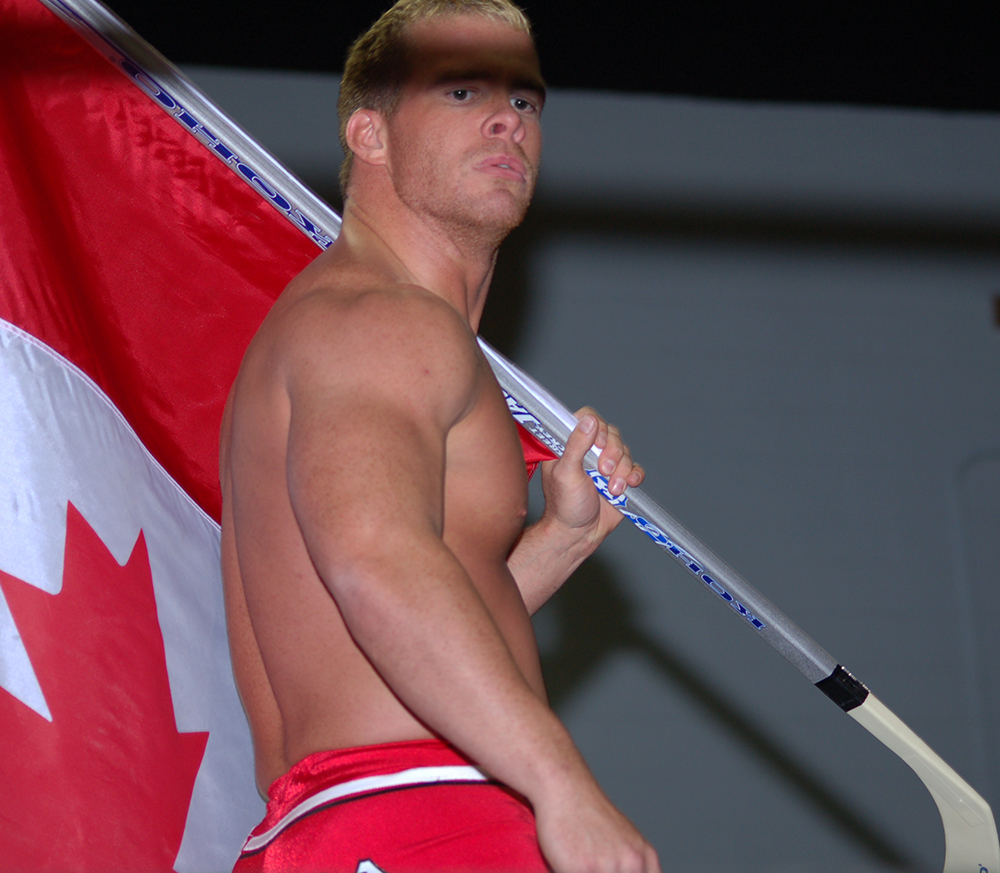
Dux at an NWA Midwest show in November 2006

Dux has been featured in an episode of Kenny vs Spenny in which the two friends train to become the best professional wrestlers. Dux is assigned with training Spenny, who chooses the name "The Nice Guy", whereas Kenny chooses the name "Specimen Yarp". When the actual match occurs, Dux turns on Spenny, aiding Kenny and his trainer in a three-on-one assault. At the conclusion of the episode, Kenny is declared the winner because Spenny breaks character, and as his humiliation forces Spenny to strip naked and receive a beating from wrestling legend The Iron Sheik.

In 2003, Dux appeared in Zombie Beach Party. Dux also makes a cameo in the music video for "Suplex" by A Tribe Called Red.

In 2020, Dux portrayed wrestler Chris Benoit in the second-season premiere of Viceland's Dark Side of the Ring. He also played Dutch Mantell in the Bruiser Brody episode.

== Personal life ==
Moody is married and has four children. Quietly retired November 2022

== Championships and accomplishments ==
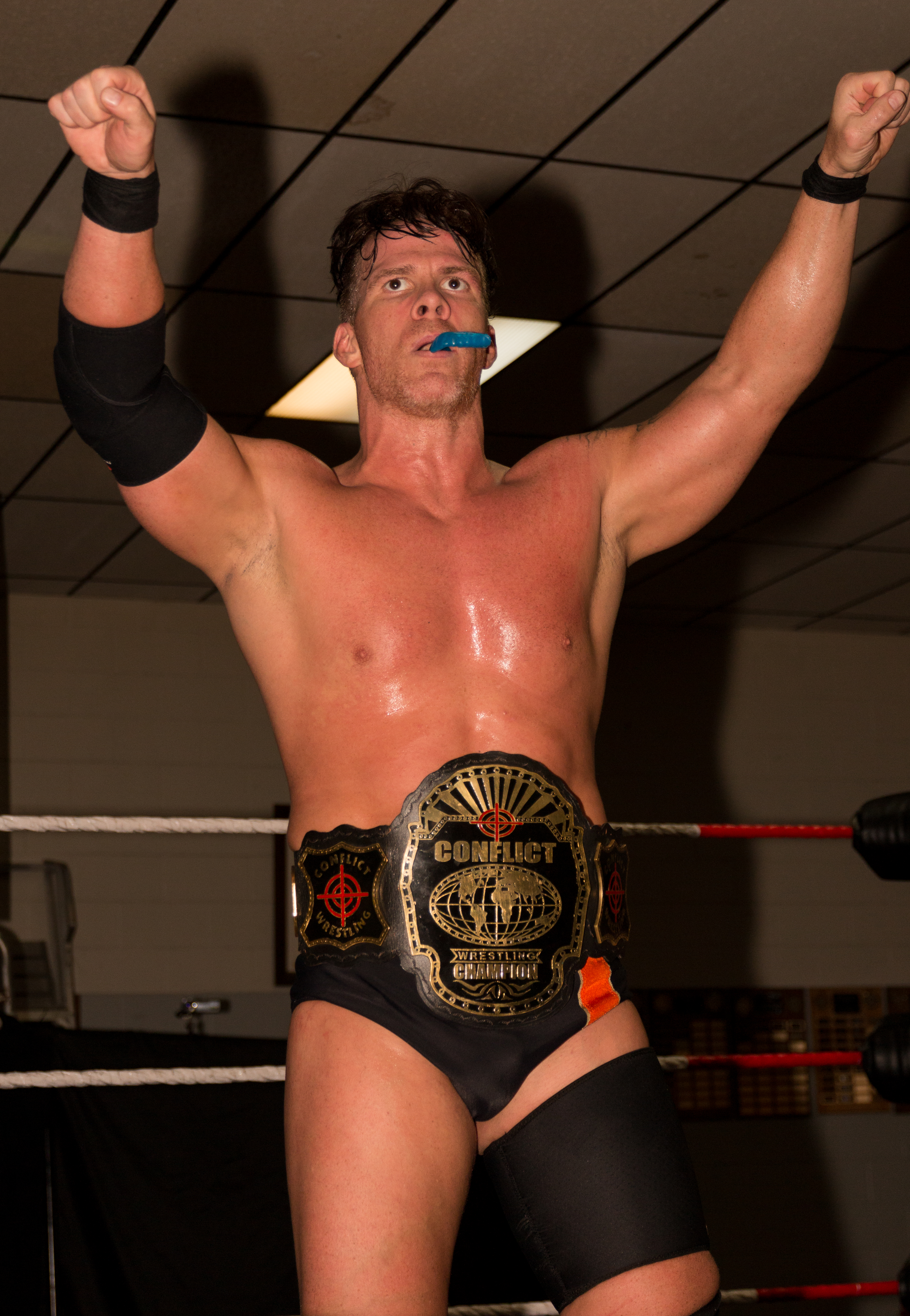
Dux with the Conflict Wrestling championship belt around his waist.

- Absolute Intense Wrestling
  - AIW Tag Team Championship (2 times) – with Tracy Williams
- All-Star Wrestling
  - ASW Canadian Heavyweight Championship (1 time)
- Alpha-1 Wrestling
  - A1 Tag Team Championship (1 time) – with Gavin Quinn and Josh Alexander
- Absolute Wrestling Entertainment
  - AWE Heavyweight Championship (1 time)
- Barrie Wrestling
  - BW Heavyweight Championship (2 time)
  - BW 400 North Tag Team Championship (1 time) - with Brent Banks And Sebastian Suave
- Blood Sweat and Ears
  - BSE Adrenaline Cup (2008)
  - BSE Arctic Championship (1 time)
  - BSE Suicide Six Pack Championship (1 time)
  - BSE Tag Team Championship (2 times) – with El Tornado
- Border City Wrestling
  - BCW Can-Am Heavyweight Championship (2 times)
  - BCW Can-Am Tag Team Championship (3 times) – with Jack Damage (2), and El Tornado (1)
- Canadian Wrestling Federation
  - CWF Heavyweight Championship (1 time)
- Twin City Wrestling
  - TCW Heavyweight Championship (1 time, inaugural)
  - TCW Heavyweight Title Tournament (2015)
- Conflict Wrestling
  - Conflict Wrestling Heavyweight Championship (1 time)
- Full Impact Wrestling
  - FIW Heavyweight Championship (1 time)
- Future Stars of Pro Wrestling
  - FSPW Internet Championship (1 time)
- Hardcore Championship Wrestling
  - HCW Heavyweight Championship (1 time)
- Maximum Pro Wrestling
  - MaxPro Triple Crown Championship (2 times)
  - MaxPro Arctic Championship (1 time)
- Motor City Wrestling
  - MCW Heavyweight Championship (1 time)
- New Vision Pro Wrestling
  - NVPW Pride Championship (1 time)
- North Shore Pro Wrestling
  - NSPW Championship (1 time)
  - NSPW Tag Team Championship (1 time) - with Tarik
- Pro Wrestling Eclipse
  - PWE Tag Team Championship (1 time) – with Tarik
- New Evolution Wrestling
  - NEW Heavyweight Championship (1 time)
- Pro Wrestling Illustrated
  - PWI ranked him #98 of the top 500 singles wrestlers in the PWI 500 in 2009
- Proving Ground Pro
  - Ryan Buckley Memorial Tournament (2016)
- Pro Wrestling Xtreme
  - PWX Bar Championship (1 time)
  - PWX X Division Championship (1 time)
- Smash Wrestling
  - Smash Wrestling Championship (1 time)
  - Smash Wrestling Tag Team Championship (1 time) - with Brent Banks
  - The Northern Tournament (2018)
- Squared Circle Wrestling
  - SCW Triple Crown Champion (1 time)
- Wolverine Pro Wrestling
  - WPW Heavyweight Championship (1 time)
- Other titles
  - ICW Cruiserweight Championship (1 time)
- Theatre Extreme/Federation de Lutte Quebecoise
  - FLQ Heavyweight Championship (1 time)
- Ontario Indy Wrestling Awards
  - Technical Wrestler Of The Year - 2008, 2009
  - Wrestler Of The Year - 2009
  - Match Of The Year - 2008: vs. Derek Wylde
