= Maximum Pro Wrestling =

Professional wrestling championship

- Acronym: MaxPro
- Founded: 2010
- Defunct: 2012
- Style: American Wrestling
- Headquarters: Windsor & Toronto, Ontario
- Founder(s): Scott D'Amore; Arda Ocal; Jason Brown; Jeffrey Scott; James Trepanier; Dave Blezard

Maximum Pro Wrestling (MaxPro) was a Canadian independent professional wrestling organization, founded in 2010 with the merger of Scott D'Amore's Border City Wrestling out of Windsor, Ontario and BSE Pro Wrestling out of Toronto, Ontario.

== History ==
The formation of MaxPro was confirmed on February 3, 2010, when D'Amore announced that he was leaving his position as an Agent with Total Nonstop Action Wrestling to pursue this new project within Ontario.

On March 3, 2010, a partnership was announced between MaxPro and Dragon Gate USA that will bring Dragon Gate USA to Canada for the first time with shows scheduled on May 7 and 8 in Windsor and Toronto respectively.

The company's inaugural tour in March 2010 was labeled as The March Breakdown Tour and was held in the cities of Niagara Falls, Chatham, and Georgetown, Ontario. Rhino headlined all three events for the tour.

The company's second tour in April 2010 was labeled as The Spring Loaded Tour and was held in the cities of Windsor, Markham, and Woodstock, Ontario. Tommy Dreamer wrestled on all 3 events for the tour.

The company's third tour in April 2010 was labeled as The Gold Rush Tour and was held in the cities of Timmins, North Bay, and Brampton, Ontario. Kevin Nash made a rare Canadian independent appearance.

== Championships ==
=== MaxPro Triple Crown Championship ===
Key
No.	Overall reign number
Reign	Reign number for the specific team—reign numbers for the individuals are in parentheses, if different
Days	Number of days held

No.	Champion	Championship change			Reign statistics		Notes	Ref.
No.	Champion	Date	Event	Location	Reign	Days	Notes	Ref.
1	Tyson Dux	March 18, 2010	N/A	Niagara Falls, Ontario	1	24	Defeated Derek Wylde to unify the BSE Suicide Six Pack title, BCW Heavyweight title, and NSP Grand Independent title	
2	Robbie McAllister	April 11, 2010	N/A	Woodstock, Ontario	1	6		
3	Tyson Dux	April 17, 2010	N/A	North Bay, Ontario	2	989 (Max)		

=== MaxPro Arctic Championship ===
Key
No.	Overall reign number
Reign	Reign number for the specific team—reign numbers for the individuals are in parentheses, if different
Days	Number of days held

No.	Champion	Championship change			Reign statistics		Notes	Ref.
No.	Champion	Date	Event	Location	Reign	Days	Notes	Ref.
1	Tyson Dux	January 18, 2008	N/A	Iqaluit, Nunavut	1	1		
2	Robbie McAllister	January 18, 2008	N/A	Iqaluit, Nunavut	1	1,809 (Max)		

- MaxPro recognizes all the previous titles of Border City Wrestling, BSE Pro, and Neo Spirit Pro-Wrestling in their records, but retired.

== Roster ==
=== Regular roster ===
- Josh Alexander
- Phil Atlas
- Turk Celik
- James Champagne
- Jayson Cyprus
- Tyson Dux
- Michael Elgin
- Flesh
- Brent B
- Johnny J
- Kobra Kai
- Tiberius King
- Marcus Marquez
- Robbie McAllister
- Jake O'Reilly
- Player Dos
- Player Uno
- Pierre Shadows
- Sebastian Suave
- Tyler Tirva

=== Female wrestlers ===
- Xandra Bale
- Nikita
- Courtney Rush
- Gabrielle Vanderpool

=== Staff ===
- Dave Blezzard (Play-By-Play Commentator)
- Bob Kapur (Colour Commentator)
- Jim Korderas (Senior Referee)
- Arda Ocal (Ring Announcer)

=== Featured stars and alumni ===
- Big Daddy Hammer
- Colt Cabana
- Dane Jarris
- Franky The Mobster
- The Hurricane
- Jimmy Jacobs
- Kevin Nash
- Kiyoshi
- Manabu Soya
- Masayuki Kono
- Matt Morgan
- Rhino
- Robbie E
- Shawn Spears
- Sonjay Dutt
- Tommy Dreamer
- Taylor Wilde
- Traci Brooks
- Val Venis
- Yujiro Kushida
