= BSE Pro =

Professional wrestling promotion

BSE Pro Wrestling
- Acronym: BSE
- Founded: 2005
- Defunct: 2010
- Style: American Wrestling
- Headquarters: Toronto, Ontario, Canada
- Founder(s): Rob Fuego; Arda Ocal; Dave Blezard; Tom Harbin; Jason Brown; Steve Cvetkovitch

BSE Pro (formerly Blood Sweat and Ears or BSE Wrestling) was a Canadian independent professional wrestling organization, founded in 2005. It held 10-12 events a year in the Greater Toronto Area, as well as quarterly tours to Northern Ontario cities such as Timmins, Sudbury, Iroquois Falls, Kirkland Lake and North Bay. It evolved into Maximum Pro Wrestling after it merged with fellow Canadian promotion Border City Wrestling in 2010.

== History ==
BSE's first show was held on July 10, 2005, at the Nashville North nightclub in Norval, Ontario. As was usual at the start of the promotion, the show was split between wrestling and music, with local band Severity playing two sets. The main event that night featured Rhyno. Also appearing were The Highlanders, Shantelle Taylor and Tiana Ringer.

The next show, in August, featured a main event pitching Christopher Daniels in a Fatal 3way against Chris Sabin and Petey Williams, as well as featuring Bobby Roode. 2005 was completed with a show in Mississauaga on 30 October, featuring Bobby Roode, Traci Brooks and Chris Kanyon, as well as a main event match between Chris Sabin and Petey Williams.

On February 5, held their first show of 2006 in Sudbury, Ontario, during which Chris Kanyon revealed that he was homosexual. Throughout the remainder of 2006, BSE brought in more outside stars including Eric Young, Tommy Dreamer, Abyss, Christian Cage, Gail Kim, AJ Styles, Monty Brown, Steve Corino, Senshi, Lance Storm and Pat Tanaka, a tactic that saw the number of fans at shows rise from 200 to around 750.

BSE Wrestling was brought to the attention of a wider audience at the 2008 CHIKARA King of Trios tournament. Team BSE, consisting of Kobra Kai, La Sombra Canadiense and Super Xtremo were involved in the second night of matches, facing Elite Pro Wrestling's representatives Da Soul Touchaz (Acid Jaz, Willie Richardson & Marshe Rockett) in the first round. However, as the three were not natural teammates, and were instead put together as a team to promote BSE Wrestling, they did not work as a team and were eliminated by Da Soul Touchaz after Willie Richardson pinned La Sombra Canadiense.

On July 22, BSE announced a free show in Mississauga, Ontario in association with The Discovery Channel's Guinea Pig show. The show's host Ryan Stock took part in the main event Extreme Rules match against Franky the Mobster. The show was recorded for broadcast on the Discovery Channel at a later date. In August 2008, BSE embarked on a cross-provincial wrestling tour, in support of the United Way. Spanning Ontario, Manitoba and Saskatchewan, the tour included characters Randy and Mr. Lahey from the Trailer Park Boys, Joe E. Legend, Rhino, and Tracy Brooks during certain stops.

On February 3, 2010 it was announced that Windsor's Border City Wrestling owner Scott D'Amore has left TNA Wrestling and has announced that his promotion, will be merging with BSE Pro, to become one of North America's largest and longest running independent wrestling company under the new banner, Maximum Pro Wrestling.

== Squared Circle Training ==
The BSE promotion is partnered with Squared Circle Training, a pro wrestling school in Toronto run by Rob Fuego and Steve Cvetkovich (Kobra Kai). Alumni include TNA Knockouts Gail Kim, Angel Williams, Traci Brooks and Shantelle Taylor aka Taylor Wilde, as well as a number of independent wrestlers such as Tiana Ringer, Xtremo and Brian Youngblood.

== Championships ==
=== BSE Suicide Six-Pack Championship ===
Key
No.	Overall reign number
Reign	Reign number for the specific team—reign numbers for the individuals are in parentheses, if different
Days	Number of days held

No.	Champion	Championship change			Reign statistics		Notes	Ref.
No.	Champion	Date	Event	Location	Reign	Days	Notes	Ref.
1	Don Paysan	September 10, 2006	BSE show	Mississauga, Ontario	1	287	Defeated Ash, James Champagne, Christopher Daniels, Bobby Roode and Chris Sabin.	
2	Ash	June 24, 2007	Higher Ground	Brampton, Ontario	1	63	Defeated James Champagne, Tyson Dux, Franky the Mobster, Don Paysan and El Tornado	
3	Franky the Mobster	August 26, 2007	BSE show	Brampton, Ontario	1	258	Defeated Ash, Cody 45, Pierre Shadows, Vane and Xtremo at Scorched Earth.	
4	Xtremo	May 10, 2008	BSE show	Iroquois Falls, Ontario	1	N/A	Defeated Bang Bang Pete, Johnny Devine, Franky the Mobster, Kaz and Akira Raijin.	
—	Deactivated	2010	—	—	—	—	Deactivated when BSE Pro Wrestling closed down	

=== BSE Tag Team Championship ===
Key
No.	Overall reign number
Reign	Reign number for the specific team—reign numbers for the individuals are in parentheses, if different
Days	Number of days held

No.	Champion	Championship change			Reign statistics		Notes	Ref.
No.	Champion	Date	Event	Location	Reign	Days	Notes	Ref.
1	The Suicide Kidz (Cody 45 and Xtremo)	April 22, 2007	BSE show	N/A	1	111	Defeated James Champagne and Robert Roode in the finals of the four-team Premier Tag Team Tournament.	
2	TNT (Tyson Dux and El Tornado)	August 11, 2007	BSE The Homecoming	North Bay, Ontario	1	182		
3	The Blackouts (Pierre Shadows and Vane)	February 9, 2008	"A Year in the Making"	Milton, Ontario	1	90		
4	TNT (Tyson Dux and El Tornado)	May 9, 2008	BSE show	Timmins, Ontario	2	93	Defeated The Blackouts and The Suicide Kidz in a Triple Threat Ladder match.	
5	The All-Starters (Brent B and Johnny J)	August 10, 2008	BSE show	North Bay, Ontario	1	371	Defeated TNT in a two out of three falls match at BSE On Tour: Night Two.	
6	Assault and Battery (Mike Elias and Kenneth Crisis)	August 16, 2009	BSE show	Brampton, Ontario	1	83	Defeated the All-Starters in a No Holds Barred match.	
7	Ashley Sixx and Michael Elgin	November 7, 2009	BSE show	Markham, Ontario	1	N/A		
—	Deactivated	2010	—	—	—	—	Deactivated when BSE Pro Wrestling closed down	

=== BSE Adrenaline Cup ===
Year:	Winner:	Date:	Location:
2005	Ash	September 25, 2005	Norval, Ontario
2006	Ash	July 9, 2006	Mississauga, Ontario
2007	Don Paysan	July 29, 2007	Brampton, Ontario
2008	Tyson Dux	November 7, 2008	Brampton, Ontario
2009	Anthony Fiasco	November 21, 2009	North Bay, Ontario

=== BSE Arctic Championship ===
Key
No.	Overall reign number
Reign	Reign number for the specific team—reign numbers for the individuals are in parentheses, if different
Days	Number of days held

No.	Champion	Championship change			Reign statistics		Notes	Ref.
No.	Champion	Date	Event	Location	Reign	Days	Notes	Ref.
1	"Textbook" Tyson Dux	January 18, 2008	BSE show	Iqaluit, Nunavut	1	1		
2	Brent B	January 18, 2008	BSE show	N/A	1	N/A		

== Alumni ==
- Abyss
- AJ Styles
- Angelina Love
- Christian Cage
- Christopher Daniels
- Chris Kanyon
- Chris Sabin
- Christy Hemme
- Cody Deaner
- Danyah Rivietz
- Doug Basham
- Eric Young
- Gail Kim
- Jay Lethal
- Joe Doering
- Joe E. Legend
- Kurt Angle
- Lance Storm
- LR11
- Matt Morgan
- Murat Bosporus
- Rhino
- Robbie McAllister
- Robert Roode
- Rory McAllister
- Samoa Joe
- Senshi
- Shawn Spears
- Sinn Bowdee
- Tommy Dreamer
- Vane

== Accolades ==
- Ontario Indy Wrestling Awards
  - Promotion Of The Year - 2008, 2009
