= Scott D'Amore =

Canadian professional wrestler, manager, and promoter

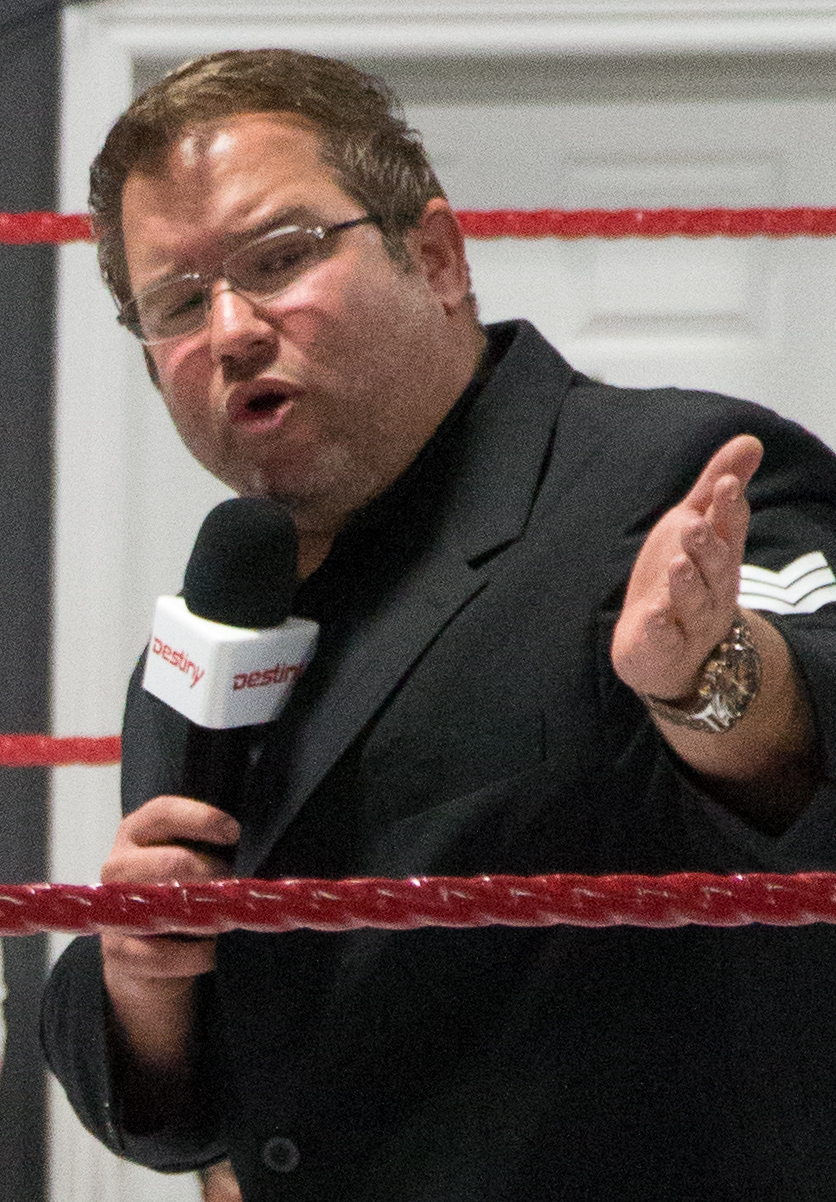
- D'Amore in 2015

Personal information
- Born: Scott Francis D'Amore; August 8, 1974 (age 52) Windsor, Ontario, Canada
- Education: University of Windsor

Professional wrestling career
- Ring name(s): Chip Birdy; Coach D'Amore; Masked Super Warrior #2; Nightmare; Scott D'Amore; Scott Hunter; Bluto
- Billed height: 5 ft 9 in (1.75 m)
- Billed weight: 253 lb (115 kg)
- Billed from: Windsor, Ontario, Canada
- Trained by: Al Snow; Denny Kass; Doug Chevalier; Mickey Doyle; WCW Power Plant
- Debut: June 14, 1992
- Retired: July 15, 2023

Scott Francis D'Amore (born August 8, 1974) is a Canadian professional wrestling manager, promoter, booker and retired professional wrestler. Since August 2024, D'Amore has been the owner and promoter of Maple Leaf Pro Wrestling (MLP), a professional wrestling promotion based in his native Canada. He is also known for his time with Total Nonstop Action Wrestling (TNA), where he served as the president and an on-screen personality for many years.

== Professional wrestling career ==
=== Early career (1991–1996) ===
D'Amore began training with Doug Chevalier in 1991 at the age of sixteen. He debuted on June 14, 1992, defeating Otis Apollo in Amherstburg, Ontario. In 1993 he underwent further training under "Irish" Mickey Doyle, Denny Kass and Al Snow. He went on to work for World Championship Wrestling and the World Wrestling Federation as an enhancement talent from June 1993 to early 1996. While working for WCW, he frequently trained at the WCW Power Plant. D'Amore worked for a range of independent promotions. In 1995 D'Amore toured Germany with the World Cup of Wrestling. In 1996 he toured Japan with Wrestle Association R and England with the English Wrestling Federation. Later that year he formed a tag team with Dave Clark as "Scott Hunter" known as "Gross Misconduct", with the duo depicting ice hockey players. In 1996 he briefly traded his hockey stick for a golf club and became "Chip Birdy", a golfer.

D'Amore began working as a booker and producer for promotions throughout Canada.

=== Border City Wrestling (1993–present) ===
D'Amore founded Border City Wrestling in 1993 along with Doug Chevalier and Chuck Fader. He began booking in 1994 when Chevalier left the area, and took over the promotion of the company when Fader resigned in 2000, leaving D'Amore as the sole owner.

In February 2000, D'Amore formed a stable known as The Syndicate when he allied himself with Rhyno to defeat D'Lo Brown. The Syndicate eventually expanded to include "Arrogant" Otis Apollo, Johnny Swinger, Fantasy and Don Callis.

BCW ceased operations for several months in late 2000, before coming back in 2001. The first show of 2001 was held on March 7, and featured former Extreme Championship Wrestling talent including Tommy Dreamer, Johnny Swinger, Mikey Whipwreck, Sabu, Don "Cyrus" Callis and Nova (D'Amore had a tryout match with ECW in 1998, and befriended many ECW employees). All the aforementioned held titles in BCW.

In addition to promoting and wrestling, D'Amore operates the Can-Am Wrestling School and trained dozens of wrestlers. He later turned face and began a heated feud with one of his students, A-1, in January 2005 after A-1 interrupted a Hall of Fame ceremony.

After being mostly inactive from 2005 to 2007, D'Amore started running events again regularly under the Border City Wrestling banner in 2008. During that time BCW was still in operation, with less of a presence from D'Amore.

BCW took a hiatus in 2010-2011 but returned with small shows in 2012. D'Amore then turned heel again by betraying one of his students of the CAN-AM Wrestling School and BCW Champion, Phil Atlas. At this time, The Syndicate re-emerged with a new group featuring Jon Bolen, Tyson Dux, Moose, and eventually Kongo Kong.

BCW still runs shows in Windsor and Michigan and is partnered with Impact Wrestling. D'Amore very occasionally wrestles for the promotion, but is often seen in a managers role for The Syndicate.

=== Total Nonstop Action Wrestling (2003–2010) ===
D'Amore began working with Total Nonstop Action Wrestling, TNA, as a road agent in 2003, and brought in Chris Sabin, one of his former pupils. In 2004, D'Amore took an onscreen role as the coach of Team Canada. The propensity of the TNA character of "Coach D'Amore" to interfere on Team Canada's behalf led to commentator Mike Tenay often referring to him as a "big fat load" and "Canadian bacon". D'Amore led Team Canada to numerous victories, feuding with Jerry Lynn, Dusty Rhodes and Dustin Rhodes. He also began working backstage as a creative team member and trainer, operating the TNA Academy along with Terry Taylor.

On December 12, 2004, D'Amore organised a benefit show for Sabu, who was incapacitated with a serious back injury. "A Night of Appreciation for Sabu" was held in Belleville, Michigan and featured wrestlers from TNA, BCW and ECW.

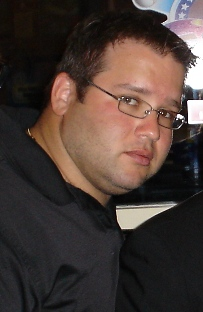
D'Amore in 2005

In May 2005, D'Amore was appointed head of the TNA booking team. As a result of his increased offscreen workload, D'Amore opted to reduce his onscreen appearances. To explain his absence, D'Amore was attacked by Lance Hoyt at the Slammiversary PPV. Hoyt choke-slammed D'Amore and then hit him with a moonsault. D'Amore was taken on a stretcher as Team Canada spent weeks afterward talking about him being in the hospital. He came back as an on-screen force, however, when he used his BCW promotion in a plot to get Jeff Jarrett back the NWA World Heavyweight Championship. After that, he and Team Canada became fixtures in the Planet Jarrett stable.

On November 13 at Genesis, D'Amore tried to get the premiering Christian Cage, a longtime friend, to join Team Canada, and gave him a T-shirt to signify membership. At the end of the night, when Team Canada came out to help Jeff Jarrett beat down Team 3D, Christian came down. Under his Captain Charisma jacket, he was wearing the Team Canada shirt. After hugging D'Amore, however, he gave him the Unprettier and helped Team 3D put Jarrett through a table, doublecrossing his former friend.

An all-or-nothing 8-man tag team match happened on the July 13 edition with them going against Rhino, Team 3D, and Jay Lethal, with a stipulation that the disbanding order would be null and void if Team Canada won; Jay Lethal pinned A-1, ending Team Canada's run as a group in TNA. Afterwards at Victory Road, D'Amore would say goodbye to the team once and for all, saying his farewells to all 4 members while blaming Young saying it was his fault they were disbanded. D'Amore had not been seen on Impact! until two years later on June 19, 2008, billed simply as a TNA Road Agent discussing Gail Kim. D'Amore then appeared on the July 17 episode of Impact!, only to get whipped by James Storm and Robert Roode. In July 2008 D'Amore's contract with TNA expired and he left to work in Border City Wrestling. However, in August 2009 D'Amore was hired back to TNA as the primary road agent for the Knockouts division. D'Amore left TNA on February 3, 2010, just as it was announced that BCW would be merging with BSE Pro to form Maximum Pro Wrestling.

=== Global Force Wrestling (2014–2017) ===
In 2014, D'Amore became the Vice President of International Relations with Jeff Jarrett's new Global Force Wrestling (GFW) promotion. On August 10, D'Amore and Jarrett made an appearance for New Japan Pro-Wrestling (NJPW), taking part in a ceremony, where Jarrett signed a working agreement between GFW and NJPW.

=== Return to Impact / TNA (2017–2024) ===
Following the purchase of Impact Wrestling, Anthem Sports & Entertainment appointed Jeff Jarrett to run the promotion. Jeff brought back many former members of the TNA backstage personnel, including Dutch Mantel, Bruce Prichard and Scott D'Amore. Jarrett appointed D'Amore with the position he had been working in Global Force Wrestling: Vice President of International Relations. After Impact Wrestling terminated its relationship with Jarrett, D'Amore took on the role as Head of Creative with Impact. On December 5, D'Amore and Don Callis were announced as Impact Wrestling's new executive vice presidents. From May 2021, D'Amore held this role alone after Callis left his position. On the January 5, 2023 episode of Impact Wrestling, Bully Ray powerbombed D' Amore through a table, injuring him. On January 13, 2023, at the Hard to Kill PPV, Santino Marella became the Director of Authority replacing D' Amore. On March 13, 2023, D'Amore was promoted to President of Impact Wrestling.

On February 7, 2024, Anthem Sports & Entertainment announced that D'Amore's contract was terminated. D'Amore was thus fired from his position as President of TNA and was replaced by Anthony Cicione. Following his release, D'Amore received praise by wrestlers he worked with including Moose, Josh Alexander, and Jordynne Grace.

=== Maple Leaf Pro Wrestling (2024–present) ===
On August 8, D’Amore announced a relaunch of the Maple Leaf Wrestling brand dubbed Maple Leaf Pro Wrestling (MLP). Its inaugural two-night event, "Forged in Excellence" took place October 19 and 20 at St. Clair College in Windsor, Ontario, and streamed live on Triller TV. The promotion has plans to upload archival footage of Maple Leaf Wrestling on its new YouTube and social media platforms.

== Personal life ==
D'Amore is of Italian descent. He holds a degree in communication studies from the University of Windsor, where he played football for the Lancers. He has owned various bars and restaurants in Windsor, Ontario and his family owns D'Amore Construction, also based in Windsor.

== Championships and accomplishments ==
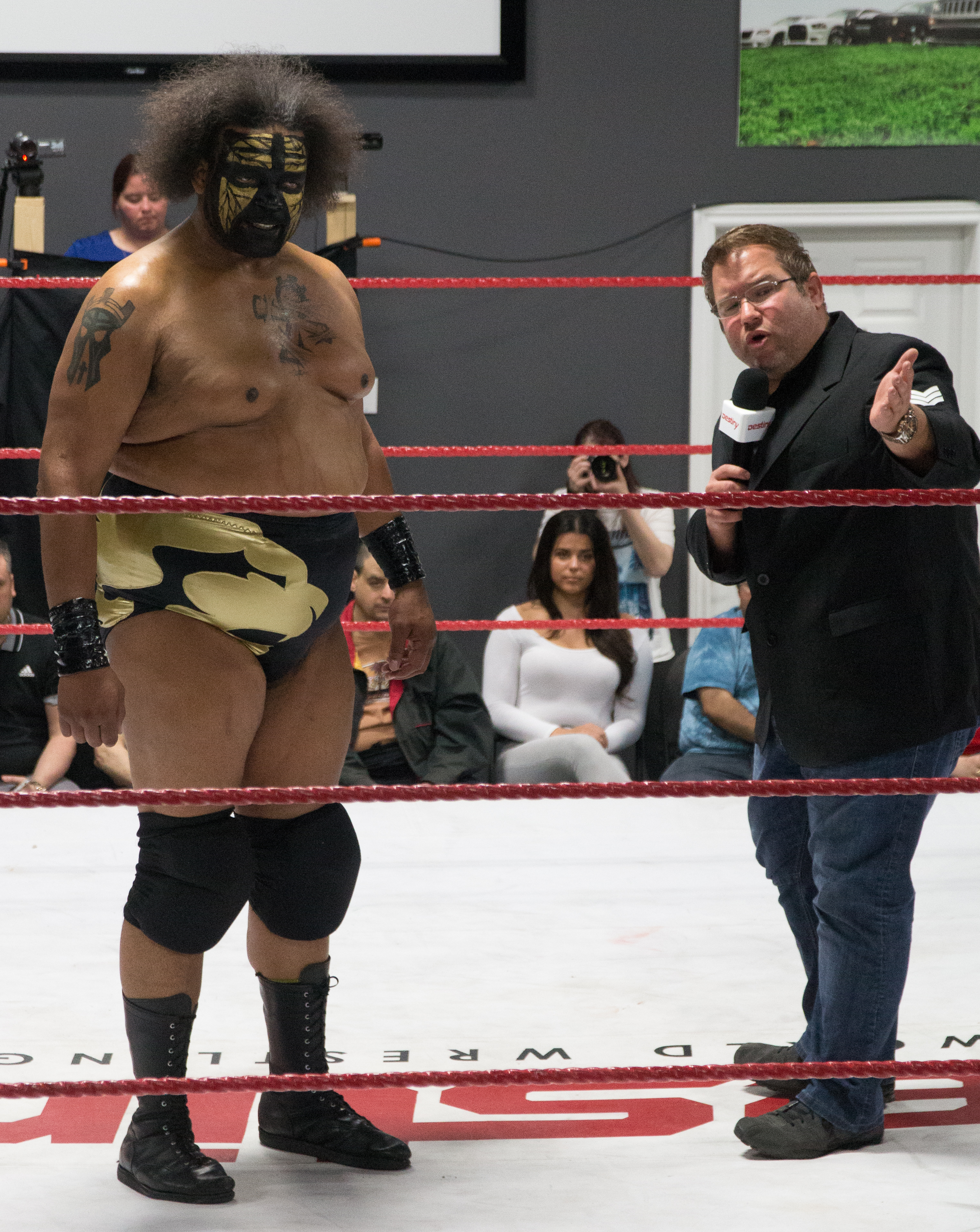
Scott D'Amore (right) addressing fans with wrestler Kongo Kong looking on, in May 2015

- Border City Wrestling
  - BCW Can-Am Heavyweight Championship (5 times)
  - BCW Can-Am Tag Team Championship (1 time) – with Bobby Clancy
  - BCW Hall of Fame (class of 2009)
- Canadian Pro-Wrestling Hall of Fame
  - Class of 2024
- Elite Wrestling Federation
  - EWF Tag Team Championship (1 time) – with Johnny Swinger
- Grand Prix Wrestling
  - Grand Prix Hybrid Championship (1 time)
- Michigan Championship Wrestling
  - MCW Can-Am Heavyweight Championship (1 time)
- Midwest Territorial Wrestling
  - MTW Tag Team Championship (1 time) – with Otis Apollo
- Ultimate Championship Wrestling
  - UCW Heavyweight Championship (1 time)
- World Wrestling Superstars
  - WWS Heavyweight Championship (1 time)
