= Border City Wrestling =

Independent professional wrestling promotion

- Acronym: BCW
- Founded: 1993 (Original), 2012 (Revival)
- Headquarters: 2501 Ouellette Avenue; Windsor, Ontario; N8X 4Y6
- Founder(s): Doug Chevalier; Scott D'Amore; Chuck Fader
- Website: bordercitywrestling.com

Border City Wrestling (BCW) is an independent professional wrestling promotion owned and booked by Scott D'Amore, and based in Windsor, Ontario, Canada.

Many of the promotion's employees were trained at the Can-Am wrestling school. After the promotion briefly merged with BSE Pro to create Maximum Pro Wrestling in 2010, an offshoot promotion named after the school would be launched in 2012. BCW would resume holding shows later that year.

== History ==
=== Early years (1993–2010) ===
Border City Wrestling was founded in late 1992 by Scott D'Amore, Chuck Fader, and "The Canadian Destroyer" Doug Chevalier. The promotion's home base was LaSalle's Centennial Arena, with most their shows being held at this venue. The promotion was known for featuring a mix of local talent and stars from major promotions, such as WWE (then known as the World Wrestling Federation (WWF)) and Extreme Championship Wrestling (ECW) in the United States.

From 2002 to 2003, BCW had a weekly television series that was produced for Cogeco Cable and aired in several Ontario markets. In 2004, BCW would merge with Ontario Championship Wrestling (OCW). At BCW's International Incident event on September 15, 2005, Total Nonstop Action Wrestling founder Jeff Jarrett defeated Raven to win the NWA World Heavyweight Championship with help from D'Amore.

On February 3, 2010, it was announced that D'Amore had left TNA Wrestling and that BCW would be merging with Toronto's BSE Pro, run by Jason A. Brown, to become Maximum Pro Wrestling. This merger would ultimately last for two years.

=== Revival (2012–2024) ===
In August 2012, an offshoot of BCW known as CAN-AM Rising debuted featuring up-and-coming talent as well as past graduates from BCW's Can-Am Wrestling School. On the debut show. Phil Atlas defeated Tyson Dux to become the new BCW Champion. In October of that year, BCW returned with its first show since breaking off from the BSE merger. One year later, on October 19, 2013, BCW held their 20th anniversary show at St. Clair College.

On May 9, 2014, BCW presented a special event titled East Meets West, featuring talent from New Japan Pro-Wrestling. The event featured appearances by Shinsuke Nakamura, Kazuchika Okada, Karl Anderson, and Hiroshi Tanahashi.

BCW's "Excellence" event, held in October 2014 and headlined by Bret Hart drew the promotion's largest crowd to date. As a result, it would become a reoccurring, annual event. The second Excellence event would be held at St. Clair College the following October in 2015.

In spring 2016, BCW revived their BCW Can-Am Tag Team Championship through a tournament. The event was won by Phil Atlas & Brent Banks after defeating The Fraternity at Spring Loaded 2016 on May 28, 2016.

In March 2017, BCW formed a partnership with Japanese promotion Pro Wrestling Noah to exchange talent between Japan and Canada.

On December 5, 2017, D'Amore and Don Callis were announced as Impact Wrestling's (known as Total Nonstop Action Wrestling (TNA) from 2004–2016, and 2024–present) new executive vice presidents. As a result, the two promotions began to work together, with content from BCW becoming available on Impact's streaming service, and most BCW events serving as television tapings for both Impact's eponymous weekly program and Xplosion.

Border City Wrestling announced their 25th Anniversary show in July 2018, on October 6 at St. Clair College. The event was filmed as part of Impact's One Night Only series for the Global Wrestling Network.

=== 2024–present ===
On February 7, Anthem Sports & Entertainment, TNA's parent company, terminated their contract with Scott D'Amore. Despite this, TNA talent would continue to be featured at BCW events.

After D’Amore acquired the trademarks to Maple Leaf Wrestling, and announced a revival of the brand called Maple Leaf Pro Wrestling (MLP), MLP's new YouTube and social media platforms would begin uploading classic content from BCW.

== Events ==
=== 2000 ===
Date	Event	Venue	City	Main Event	Notes
November 29	Doug Chevalier Memorial Tag Tournament	IBEW Local Union 58 Hall	Detroit, Michigan		
November 30	Doug Chevalier Memorial Tag Tournament	Ciciaro Club	Oldcastle, Ontario, Canada		
(c) – refers to the champion(s) heading into the match

=== 2001 ===
Date	Event	Venue	City	Main Event	Notes
August 28	Mikey Whipwreck Retirement Bash	Ciciaro Club	Oldcastle, Ontario, Canada		
(c) – refers to the champion(s) heading into the match

=== 2002 ===
Date	Event	Venue	City	Main Event	Notes
November 28	Doug Chevalier Memorial Show	Ciciaro Club	Oldcastle, Ontario, Canada		
(c) – refers to the champion(s) heading into the match

=== 2003 ===
Date	Event	Venue	City	Main Event	Notes
January 15	New Year's Revolution	Ciciaro Club	Oldcastle, Ontario, Canada		
March 6	March Breakdown	Ciciaro Club	Oldcastle, Ontario, Canada		
April 17	Culture Shock	Ciciaro Club	Oldcastle, Ontario, Canada		Co-produced with Maximum Xtreme Pro Wrestling
May 27	Vendetta	Ciciaro Club	Oldcastle, Ontario, Canada		Co-produced with Maximum Xtreme Pro Wrestling
July 24	10th Anniversary Show	Ciciaro Club	Oldcastle, Ontario, Canada		
November 19	Belleville Bash	Diamondback Saloon	Belleville, Michigan		Co-produced with Insane Wrestling Federation
November 21	Belleville Bash 2	Diamondback Saloon	Belleville, Michigan		Co-produced with Insane Wrestling Federation
(c) – refers to the champion(s) heading into the match

=== 2004 ===
Date	Event	Venue	City	Main Event	Notes
February 8	Vendetta	Diamondback Saloon	Belleville, Michigan		Co-produced with Prime Time Wrestling
May 30	Resurrection	Dillon's Niteclub	Windsor, Ontario, Canada		
June 27	Payback	Dillon's Niteclub	Windsor, Ontario, Canada		
July 25	Heatwave	Dillon's Niteclub	Windsor, Ontario, Canada		
October 24	Fan Appreciation Night	Dillon's Niteclub	Windsor, Ontario, Canada		
November 28	A Steiner Thanksgiving	Diamondback Saloon	Belleville, Michigan		Co-produced with Prime Time Wrestling
(c) – refers to the champion(s) heading into the match

=== 2005 ===
Date	Event	Venue	City	Main Event	Notes
January 21	Doug Chevalier Memorial	Ciciaro Club	Oldcastle, Ontario, Canada		
February 27	Aftershock	Octane Night Club	Windsor, Ontario, Canada		
April 15	Nobody's Fool	Hellenic Banquet Halls	Oldcastle, Ontario, Canada		
April 17	Re-Generation X	Diamondback Saloon	Belleville, Michigan		Co-produced with Prime Time Wrestling
July 22	WrestleFest		Oldcastle, Ontario, Canada		
September 15	International Incident	Ciociaro Club	Oldcastle, Ontario, Canada		
(c) – refers to the champion(s) heading into the match

=== 2006 ===
Date	Event	Venue	City	Main Event	Notes
July 15	WrestleFest	Riverfront Festival Plaza	Windsor, Ontario, Canada		
(c) – refers to the champion(s) heading into the match

=== 2008 ===
Date	Event	Venue	City	Main Event	Notes
May 3	Awakening	Assumption College Catholic High School	Windsor, Ontario, Canada		
June 30	WrestleFest	Riverfront Festival Plaza	Windsor, Ontario, Canada		
July 18	Double Jeopardy	CAW Hall	Chatham, Ontario, Canada		
July 19	Double Jeopardy	Royal Canadian Legion 261	Tecumseh, Ontario, Canada		
October 4	Night of Extreme	Assumption College Catholic High School	Windsor, Ontario, Canada		
December 13	15th Anniversary Show	Assumption College Catholic High School	Windsor, Ontario, Canada		
(c) – refers to the champion(s) heading into the match

=== 2009 ===
Date	Event	Venue	City	Main Event	Notes
March 27	March Breakdown Tour	Canadian Serbian Cultural Centre	Niagara Falls, Ontario, Canada		
March 28	March Breakdown Tour	Assumption College Catholic High School	Windsor, Ontario, Canada		
March 29	March Breakdown Tour	Goff Hall	Woodstock, Ontario, Canada		
May 8	Spring Loaded Tour	CAW Hall	Chatham, Ontario, Canada		
May 9	Spring Loaded Tour	Morrisburg Arena	Morrisburg, Ontario, Canada		
May 16	Spring Loaded Tour	Royal Canadian Legion 261	Tecumseh, Ontario, Canada		
June 27	WrestleFest	Windsor Armouries	Windsor, Ontario, Canada		
September 12	Aftershock	Royal Canadian Legion 261	Tecumseh, Ontario, Canada		
September 13	Fan Appreciation Day	Dillon's Nightclub	Windsor, Ontario, Canada		
November 13	War Without Honour	Windsor Armouries	Windsor, Ontario, Canada		
(c) – refers to the champion(s) heading into the match

=== 2012 ===
Date	Event	Venue	City	Main Event	Notes
August 24	Rising	Windsor Croatian Centre	Windsor, Ontario, Canada		Co-produced with Can-Am Rising Wrestling
(c) – refers to the champion(s) heading into the match

=== 2013 ===
Date	Event	Venue	City	Main Event	Notes
February 2	Rising	The Caboto Club	Windsor, Ontario, Canada		Co-produced with Can-Am Rising Wrestling
July 19	Rising	The Caboto Club	Windsor, Ontario, Canada		Co-produced with Can-Am Rising Wrestling
October 19	20th Anniversary Show	St. Clair College	Windsor, Ontario, Canada		
(c) – refers to the champion(s) heading into the match

=== 2014 ===
Date	Event	Venue	City	Main Event	Notes
May 9	East Meets West	St. Clair College	Windsor, Ontario, Canada		
October 18	Excellence	St. Clair College	Windsor, Ontario, Canada		
(c) – refers to the champion(s) heading into the match

=== 2015 ===
Date	Event	Venue	City	Main Event	Notes
February 20	Campus Combat	St. Clair College	Windsor, Ontario, Canada		
October 17	Excellence	St. Clair College	Windsor, Ontario, Canada		
November 20	Pre-Wedding Warfare	Club Alouette	Windsor, Ontario, Canada		
(c) – refers to the champion(s) heading into the match

=== 2016 ===
Date	Event	Venue	City	Main Event	Notes
May 28	Spring Loaded	Royal Canadian Legion 261	Tecumseh, Ontario, Canada		
June 20	Fantastic Father's Day	Unifor Local 195	Windsor, Ontario, Canada		
August 20	Heatwave	Royal Canadian Legion 261	Tecumseh, Ontario, Canada		
November 5	Excellence	St. Clair College	Windsor, Ontario, Canada		
November 18	Ontario Super Series	Don Kolov Arena	Mississauga, Ontario, Canada		Co-produced with Destiny Pro Wrestling and Battle Arts Professional Wrestling
December 18	Twas The Fight Before Christmas	Royal Canadian Legion 261	Tecumseh, Ontario, Canada		
(c) – refers to the champion(s) heading into the match

=== 2017 ===
Date	Event	Venue	City	Main Event	Notes
January 11	New Years Revolution	University of Windsor	Windsor, Ontario, Canada		
March 25	March Breakdown	St. Clair College	Windsor, Ontario, Canada		
October 14	Excellence	St. Clair College	Windsor, Ontario, Canada		
December 3	Motown Showdown	Diamondback Saloon	Belleville, Michigan		
(c) – refers to the champion(s) heading into the match

=== 2018 ===
Date	Event	Venue	City	Main Event	Notes
March 3	One Night Only: March Breakdown	St. Clair College	Windsor, Ontario, Canada		Co-produced with Impact Wrestling
March 4	Last Chancery	Don Kolov Arena	Mississauga, Ontario, Canada		Co-produced with Impact Wrestling and Destiny Pro Wrestling
October 6	One Night Only: 25th Anniversary	St. Clair College	Windsor, Ontario, Canada		Co-produced with Impact Wrestling
October 7	Motown Showdown	Diamondback Saloon	Belleville, Michigan		Co-produced with Impact Wrestling
December 8	Twas The Fight Before Christmas 2	Royal Canadian Legion 261	Tecumseh, Ontario, Canada		
(c) – refers to the champion(s) heading into the match

=== 2019 ===
Date	Event	Venue	City	Main Event	Notes
August 25	Heatwave	Royal Canadian Legion 261	Tecumseh, Ontario, Canada		
December 8	Motown Showdown	Diamondback Saloon	Belleville, Michigan		Co-produced with Impact Wrestling
(c) – refers to the champion(s) heading into the match

=== 2022 ===
Date	Event	Venue	City	Main Event	Notes
July 10	Essex Fun Fest	Essex Centre Sports Complex	Essex, Ontario, Canada		
(c) – refers to the champion(s) heading into the match

=== 2023 ===
Date	Event	Venue	City	Main Event	Notes
June 17	Family Fathers Extravaganza	St. Clair College	Windsor, Ontario, Canada		
July 9	Essex Fun Fest	Essex Centre Sports Complex	Essex, Ontario, Canada		
October 7	30th Anniversary	St. Clair College	Windsor, Ontario, Canada		
(c) – refers to the champion(s) heading into the match

=== 2024 ===
Date	Event	Venue	City	Main Event	Notes
June 15	Fantastic Fathers	St. Clair College	Windsor, Ontario, Canada		
July 7	Essex Fun Fest	Essex Centre Sports Complex	Essex, Ontario, Canada		
July 27	Downtown Showdown	Lefty's on the O	Windsor, Ontario, Canada		
September 15	60th Annual Cottam Fall Fair & Horse Festival	Ridgeview Park	Cottam, Ontario, Canada		
(c) – refers to the champion(s) heading into the match

== Champions ==
Current Champions:

Championship:	Current champion(s):	Held since:
BCW Can-Am Heavyweight Championship	Jake Something	October 7, 2023
BCW Can-Am Tag Team Championship	Aiden Prince & El Reverso	September 15, 2024

Retired Championships:

Championship:	Last Champion:	Date won:
BCW Can-Am Television Championship	Nate Mattson	July 15, 2006

== Roster ==
- Aiden Prince
- Aurora Teves
- Brent Banks
- Bhupinder Gujjar
- Bryce Hansen
- Cody Deaner
- Darren McCarty
- El Reverso
- Gisele Shaw
- Jake Something
- Kurt Hendrick
- Mat DuVall
- Matrox
- 'Psycho' Mike Rollins
- 'Amazing' N8 Mattson
- Nate Bock
- Rohan Raja
- Rohit Raju
- Sam Beale
- Scott D'Amore
- Sheldon Jean
- Taylor Rising
- Tyler Tirva

== BCW Hall of Fame ==
The BCW Hall of Fame is a professional wrestling hall of fame maintained by Border City Wrestling. It was established in 2009 to honor select wrestling personalities, mostly alumni of the Ontario-based promotion. The induction ceremony for the Class of 2009, the inaugural inductees into the Hall of Fame, took place at BCW's "War Without Honour" held at the Windsor Armories on November 13, 2009. Doug Chevalier and Chuck Fader, the original co-founders of BCW along with Scott D'Amore in 1992, led the class, along with other former BCW "originals".

#	Year	Ring name (Real name)^{[a]}	Inducted by	Inducted for	Notes^{[b]}
1	2009	The Canadian Destroyer (Doug Chevalier)		Wrestling	Posthumous inductee; won the BCW Can-Am Championship (1 time) and founder of the BCW Can-Am Wrestling School
2	2009	Chuck Fader		Promoting	Co-founder of Border City Wrestling
3	2009	Otis Apollo		Wrestling	Won the BCW Can-Am Tag Team Championship (5 times)
4	2009	Bobby Clancy		Wrestling	Won the BCW Can-Am Tag Team Championship (5 times)
5	2009	Mickey Doyle		Wrestling	Won the BCW Can-Am Championship (2 times)
6	2009	Denny Kass (Dennis Kasprowicz)		Wrestling	Won the BCW Can-Am Championship (1 time) and BCW Can-Am Tag Team Championship (1 time)
7	2009	Larry Destiny (Larry Brun)		Wrestling	Won the BCW Can-Am Tag Team Championship (1 time)
8	2009	Scott D'Amore		Wrestling	Won the BCW Can-Am Championship (5 times) and BCW Can-Am Tag Team Championship (1 time)
9	2023	Jeffrey Scott		Promoting	Referee, announcer, emcee, and promoter for BCW since 1993

- ^{a} – Entries without a birth name indicates that the inductee did not perform under a ring name.
- ^{b} – This section mainly lists the major accomplishments of each inductee in the promotion.
