= List of TNA pay-per-view and livestreaming events =

This is a list of events held by the American professional wrestling promotion Total Nonstop Action Wrestling (TNA) on pay-per-view (PPV) and on streaming services.

From its inception, TNA's main output was a two-hour weekly program broadcast exclusively on pay-per-view. Their first event was held on June 19, 2002, in Huntsville, Alabama; the last of these shows aired on September 8, 2004. Soon after the launch of its flagship, weekly television program, Impact!, on June 4, 2004, the promotion began producing monthly, live, three-hour pay-per-view events; the first of these events, Victory Road aired on November 7, 2004. These events were initially held at the Impact Zone in Orlando, Florida.

In January 2013, TNA's monthly event schedule was revamped to focus on four, quarterly-held, PPV cards (later reduced to two events per year, from 2015 to 2017). In place of monthly events, TNA began producing the TNA One Night Only series of taped specials that aired via pay-per-view providers. These in-turn would be succeeded from 2019 onwards by the TNA+ Monthly Specials, which are directly tied to storylines leading into the promotion's PPV events. In 2024, the promotion began using the term "Premium Live Event" to refer to their events airing on PPV and the livestreaming services.

== Weekly pay-per-view events (2002–2004) ==
=== NWA: Total Nonstop Action events ===
Events promoted when the promotion was known as NWA: Total Nonstop Action (NWA:TNA) under the National Wrestling Alliance banner.

==== 2002 ====
Date	Event	Venue	Location	Main event
June 19	Weekly PPV #1	Von Braun Center	Huntsville, Alabama	20-man Gauntlet for the Gold for the NWA World Heavyweight Championship
June 19 (aired June 26)	Weekly PPV #2	Von Braun Center	Huntsville, Alabama	A.J. Styles vs. Jerry Lynn vs. Low Ki vs. Psicosis in a four-way double elimination match for the NWA TNA X Championship
July 3	Weekly PPV #3	Nashville Municipal Auditorium	Nashville, Tennessee	Jeff Jarrett and K-Krush vs. Brian Christopher and Scott Hall
July 10	Weekly PPV #4	Nashville Municipal Auditorium	Nashville, Tennessee	Christopher Daniels vs. Elix Skipper vs. Jerry Lynn vs. Kid Romeo vs. Low Ki vs. Tony Mamaluke in an NWA TNA X Championship Contender's Ranking Six-Way Elimination match
July 17	Weekly PPV #5	Nashville Municipal Auditorium	Nashville, Tennessee	Brian Lawler vs. Scott Hall
July 24	Weekly PPV #6	TNA Asylum (Nashville Fairgrounds)	Nashville, Tennessee	Ken Shamrock (c) vs. Sabu in a Ladder vs. Submission match for the NWA World Heavyweight Championship
July 31	Weekly PPV #7	TNA Asylum (Nashville Fairgrounds)	Nashville, Tennessee	Scott Hall vs. Jeff Jarrett in a stretcher match
August 7	Weekly PPV #8	TNA Asylum (Nashville Fairgrounds)	Nashville, Tennessee	A.J. Styles (c) vs. Jerry Lynn vs. Low Ki for the NWA TNA X Championship
August 14	Weekly PPV #9	TNA Asylum (Nashville Fairgrounds)	Nashville, Tennessee	A.J. Styles and Jerry Lynn (c) vs. Jeff Jarrett and Ron Killings for the NWA World Tag Team Championship
August 21	Weekly PPV #10	TNA Asylum (Nashville Fairgrounds)	Nashville, Tennessee	A.J. Styles vs. Jerry Lynn in an iron man match to determine the number one contender to the NWA TNA X Championship
August 21 (aired August 28)	Weekly PPV #11	TNA Asylum (Nashville Fairgrounds)	Nashville, Tennessee	Low Ki (c) vs. A.J. Styles vs. Jerry Lynn in a triple ladder match for the NWA TNA X Championship
September 4	Weekly PPV #12	TNA Asylum (Nashville Fairgrounds)	Nashville, Tennessee	Featured the best of NWA-TNA's X Division
September 18	Weekly PPV #13	TNA Asylum (Nashville Fairgrounds)	Nashville, Tennessee	Ron Killings (c) vs. Jerry Lynn for the NWA World Heavyweight Championship
September 25	Weekly PPV #14	TNA Asylum (Nashville Fairgrounds)	Nashville, Tennessee	BG James vs. Jeff Jarrett
October 2	Weekly PPV #15	TNA Asylum (Nashville Fairgrounds)	Nashville, Tennessee	BG James and Syxx-Pac vs. Brian Lawler and Jeff Jarrett
October 9	Weekly PPV #16	TNA Asylum (Nashville Fairgrounds)	Nashville, Tennessee	Ace Steel vs. A.J. Styles vs. Joel Maximo vs. Jose Maximo vs. Kid Kash vs. Syxx-Pac vs. Tony Mamaluke in a ladder match for the vacant NWA TNA X Championship
October 16	Weekly PPV #17	TNA Asylum (Nashville Fairgrounds)	Nashville, Tennessee	Ron Killings (c) vs. Curt Hennig for the NWA World Heavyweight Championship
October 23	Weekly PPV #18	TNA Asylum (Nashville Fairgrounds)	Nashville, Tennessee	Ron Killings (c) vs. Curt Hennig for the NWA World Heavyweight Championship
October 30	Weekly PPV #19	TNA Asylum (Nashville Fairgrounds)	Nashville, Tennessee	A.J. Styles (c) vs. The Amazing Red for the NWA TNA X Championship
November 6	Weekly PPV #20	TNA Asylum (Nashville Fairgrounds)	Nashville, Tennessee	A.J. Styles (c) vs. Jerry Lynn for the NWA TNA X Championship
November 13	Weekly PPV #21	TNA Asylum (Nashville Fairgrounds)	Nashville, Tennessee	Jerry Lynn (c) vs. A.J. Styles vs. Kid Kash for the NWA TNA X Championship
November 20	Weekly PPV #22	TNA Asylum (Nashville Fairgrounds)	Nashville, Tennessee	Ron Killings (c) vs. Jeff Jarrett for the NWA World Heavyweight Championship
November 27	Weekly PPV #23	TNA Asylum (Nashville Fairgrounds)	Nashville, Tennessee	Jeff Jarrett (c) vs. Ron Killings for the NWA World Heavyweight Championship
December 4	Weekly PPV #24	TNA Asylum (Nashville Fairgrounds)	Nashville, Tennessee	Jeff Jarrett and Ron Killings vs. The Harris Brothers (Don and Ron)
December 11	Weekly PPV #25	TNA Asylum (Nashville Fairgrounds)	Nashville, Tennessee	Jeff Jarrett (c) vs. Curt Hennig for the NWA World Heavyweight Championship
December 18	Weekly PPV #26	TNA Asylum (Nashville Fairgrounds)	Nashville, Tennessee	Triple X (Christopher Daniels, Elix Skipper and Low Ki) vs. The Amazing Red and The S.A.T. (Joel and Jose Maximo)
(c) – refers to the champion(s) heading into the match

==== 2003 ====
Date	Event	Venue	Location	Main event
January 8	Weekly PPV #27	TNA Asylum (Nashville Fairgrounds)	Nashville, Tennessee	Jeff Jarrett vs. Triple X (Christopher Daniels, Elix Skipper and Low Ki)
January 15	Weekly PPV #28	TNA Asylum (Nashville Fairgrounds)	Nashville, Tennessee	Dusty Rhodes, Jeff Jarrett and The Road Warriors (Animal and Hawk) vs. Triple X (Christopher Daniels, Elix Skipper and Low Ki) and Vince Russo
January 22	Weekly PPV #29	TNA Asylum (Nashville Fairgrounds)	Nashville, Tennessee	Jeff Jarrett (c) vs. BG James, Christopher Daniels and Don Harris in a 3-on-1 Handicap elimination match for the NWA World Heavyweight Championship
January 29	Weekly PPV #30	TNA Asylum (Nashville Fairgrounds)	Nashville, Tennessee	The Rock 'n' Roll Express (Ricky Morton and Robert Gibson) vs. America's Most Wanted (Chris Harris and James Storm)
February 5	Weekly PPV #31	TNA Asylum (Nashville Fairgrounds)	Nashville, Tennessee	Triple X (Elix Skipper and Low Ki) (c) vs. The Disciples of the New Church (Brian Lee and Slash) for the NWA World Heavyweight Championship
February 12	Weekly PPV #32	TNA Asylum (Nashville Fairgrounds)	Nashville, Tennessee	The Sandman vs. Raven in a falls count anywhere match
February 19	Weekly PPV #33	TNA Asylum (Nashville Fairgrounds)	Nashville, Tennessee	Jeff Jarrett (c) vs. A.J. Styles for the NWA World Heavyweight Championship
February 26	Weekly PPV #34	TNA Asylum (Nashville Fairgrounds)	Nashville, Tennessee	Dusty Rhodes and Vader vs. The Harris Brothers (Don and Ron)
March 5	Weekly PPV #35	TNA Asylum (Nashville Fairgrounds)	Nashville, Tennessee	The Sandman vs. Raven in Raven's Clockwork Orange House of Fun match
March 12	Weekly PPV #36	TNA Asylum (Nashville Fairgrounds)	Nashville, Tennessee	A.J. Styles vs. Raven to determine the number one contender to the NWA World Heavyweight Championship
March 19	Weekly PPV #37	TNA Asylum (Nashville Fairgrounds)	Nashville, Tennessee	A.J. Styles vs. Raven in a ladder match to determine the number one contender to the NWA World Heavyweight Championship
March 26	Weekly PPV #38	TNA Asylum (Nashville Fairgrounds)	Nashville, Tennessee	Perry Saturn, The Sandman and The Disciples of the New Church (Brian Lee and Slash) vs. The Harris Brothers (Don and Ron) and Triple X (Christopher Daniels and Elix Skipper) in a Sadistic Madness match
April 2	Weekly PPV #39	TNA Asylum (Nashville Fairgrounds)	Nashville, Tennessee	Jeff Jarrett (c) vs. D-Lo Brown for the NWA World Heavyweight Championship
April 9	Weekly PPV #40	TNA Asylum (Nashville Fairgrounds)	Nashville, Tennessee	Jerry Lynn and The Amazing Red vs. Chris Sabin and Jonny Storm vs. Jason Cross and Shark Boy vs. Triple X (Christopher Daniels and Elix Skipper) to determine the number one contender to the NWA World Tag Team Championship
April 16	Weekly PPV #41	TNA Asylum (Nashville Fairgrounds)	Nashville, Tennessee	Jeff Jarrett vs. Alexis Laree and Julio Dinero in Raven's Clockwork Orange House of Fun match
April 23	Weekly PPV #42	TNA Asylum (Nashville Fairgrounds)	Nashville, Tennessee	The Amazing Red vs. Jerry Lynn to determine the number one contender to the NWA TNA X Championship
April 30	Weekly PPV #43	TNA Asylum (Nashville Fairgrounds)	Nashville, Tennessee	Jeff Jarrett (c) vs. Raven for the NWA World Heavyweight Championship
May 7	Weekly PPV #44	TNA Asylum (Nashville Fairgrounds)	Nashville, Tennessee	Anarchy in the Asylum battle royal
May 14	Weekly PPV #45	TNA Asylum (Nashville Fairgrounds)	Nashville, Tennessee	Triple X (Christopher Daniels and Elix Skipper) (c) vs. A.J. Styles and D-Lo Brown for the NWA World Tag Team Championship
May 21	Weekly PPV #46	TNA Asylum (Nashville Fairgrounds)	Nashville, Tennessee	The Sandman vs. Sonny Siaki in Raven's Clockwork Orange House of Fun match
May 28	Weekly PPV #47	TNA Asylum (Nashville Fairgrounds)	Nashville, Tennessee	Glen Gilberti vs. Raven
June 4	Weekly PPV #48	TNA Asylum (Nashville Fairgrounds)	Nashville, Tennessee	Jeff Jarrett (c) vs. Glen Gilberti for the NWA World Heavyweight Championship
June 11	Weekly PPV #49	TNA Asylum (Nashville Fairgrounds)	Nashville, Tennessee	Jeff Jarrett (c) vs. A.J. Styles and Raven for the NWA World Heavyweight Championship
June 18	Weekly PPV #50: 1st Anniversary Show	TNA Asylum (Nashville Fairgrounds)	Nashville, Tennessee	Jeff Jarrett and Sting vs. A.J. Styles and Syxx-Pac
June 25	Weekly PPV #51	TNA Asylum (Nashville Fairgrounds)	Nashville, Tennessee	Jeff Jarrett and Raven vs. Glen Gilberti and Shane Douglas
July 2	Weekly PPV #52	TNA Asylum (Nashville Fairgrounds)	Nashville, Tennessee	A.J. Styles (c) vs. Frankie Kazarian for the NWA World Heavyweight Championship
July 9	Weekly PPV #53	TNA Asylum (Nashville Fairgrounds)	Nashville, Tennessee	A.J. Styles (c) vs. D-Lo Brown for the NWA World Heavyweight Championship
July 16	Weekly PPV #54	TNA Asylum (Nashville Fairgrounds)	Nashville, Tennessee	D-Lo Brown vs. Vince Russo
July 23	Weekly PPV #55	TNA Asylum (Nashville Fairgrounds)	Nashville, Tennessee	A.J. Styles vs. D-Lo Brown in a ladder match for the NWA World Heavyweight Championship
July 30	Weekly PPV #56	TNA Asylum (Nashville Fairgrounds)	Nashville, Tennessee	Jeff Jarrett vs. Legend in a Guitar and Baseball Bat on a Pole match
August 6	Weekly PPV #57	TNA Asylum (Nashville Fairgrounds)	Nashville, Tennessee	A.J. Styles (c) vs. D-Lo Brown in a steel cage match for the NWA World Heavyweight Championship
August 13	Weekly PPV #58	TNA Asylum (Nashville Fairgrounds)	Nashville, Tennessee	A.J. Styles (c) vs. Low Ki for the NWA World Heavyweight Championship
August 20	Weekly PPV #59	TNA Asylum (Nashville Fairgrounds)	Nashville, Tennessee	Raven vs. Shane Douglas to determine the number one contender to the NWA World Heavyweight Championship
August 20 (aired September 3)	Weekly PPV #61: Super X Cup	TNA Asylum (Nashville Fairgrounds)	Nashville, Tennessee	Chris Harris, D-Lo Brown, James Storm, Jeff Jarrett and Raven vs. A.J. Styles, Christopher Daniels, Johnny Swinger, Shane Douglas and Simon Diamond in a Wednesday Bloody Wednesday match
August 27	Weekly PPV #60	TNA Asylum (Nashville Fairgrounds)	Nashville, Tennessee	A.J. Styles (c) vs. Raven for the NWA World Heavyweight Championship
September 10	NWA-TNA Special Presentation	TNA Asylum (Nashville Fairgrounds)	Nashville, Tennessee	Triple X (Christopher Daniels and Elix Skipper) (c) vs. America's Most Wanted (Chris Harris and James Storm) for the NWA World Tag Team Championship
September 17	Weekly PPV #62	TNA Asylum (Nashville Fairgrounds)	Nashville, Tennessee	Raven vs. Shane Douglas in a Hair vs. Hair match
September 24	Weekly PPV #63	TNA Asylum (Nashville Fairgrounds)	Nashville, Tennessee	The Gathering (CM Punk, Julio Dinero and Raven) vs. Shane Douglas and The Disciples of the New Church (Sinn and Slash) in a dog collar match
October 1	Weekly PPV #64	TNA Asylum (Nashville Fairgrounds)	Nashville, Tennessee	Dusty Rhodes and Jeff Jarrett vs. A.J. Styles and Vince Russo
October 8	Weekly PPV #65	TNA Asylum (Nashville Fairgrounds)	Nashville, Tennessee	A.J. Styles (c) vs. Dusty Rhodes for the NWA World Heavyweight Championship
October 15	Weekly PPV #66	TNA Asylum (Nashville Fairgrounds)	Nashville, Tennessee	Slash and Vampiro vs. The Gathering (CM Punk and Julio Dinero)
October 22	Weekly PPV #67	TNA Asylum (Nashville Fairgrounds)	Nashville, Tennessee	A.J. Styles (c) vs. Jeff Jarrett for the NWA World Heavyweight Championship
October 29	Weekly PPV #68	TNA Asylum (Nashville Fairgrounds)	Nashville, Tennessee	Jeff Jarrett vs. Rick Steiner
November 5	Weekly PPV #69	TNA Asylum (Nashville Fairgrounds)	Nashville, Tennessee	Jeff Jarrett (c) vs. Sting for the NWA World Heavyweight Championship
November 12	Weekly PPV #70	TNA Asylum (Nashville Fairgrounds)	Nashville, Tennessee	A.J. Styles and Sting vs. Jeff Jarrett and Lex Luger
November 19	Weekly PPV #71	TNA Asylum (Nashville Fairgrounds)	Nashville, Tennessee	A.J. Styles vs. Abyss
November 26	Weekly PPV #72	TNA Asylum (Nashville Fairgrounds)	Nashville, Tennessee	Dusty Rhodes vs. Jeff Jarrett in a Fan's Revenge Lumberjack Strap match
December 3	Weekly PPV #73	TNA Asylum (Nashville Fairgrounds)	Nashville, Tennessee	Jeff Jarrett (c) vs. A.J. Styles for the NWA World Heavyweight Championship
December 10	Weekly PPV #74	TNA Asylum (Nashville Fairgrounds)	Nashville, Tennessee	A.J. Styles and D-Lo Brown vs. Jeff Jarrett and Kid Kash
December 17	Weekly PPV #75	TNA Asylum (Nashville Fairgrounds)	Nashville, Tennessee	Abyss, Kevin Northcutt and Legend vs. The Gathering (CM Punk, Julio Dinero and Raven) in a steel cage match
December 24	Best of the X Division in 2003	TNA Asylum (Nashville Fairgrounds)	Nashville, Tennessee	Featured the best matches of X Division from 2003
December 31	Best of TNA 2003	TNA Asylum (Nashville Fairgrounds)	Nashville, Tennessee	Featured the best main event matches from 2003
(c) – refers to the champion(s) heading into the match

=== Total Nonstop Action Wrestling events ===
Events promoted after the promotion dropped the NWA branding.

==== 2004 ====
Date	Event	Venue	Location	Main event
January 7	Weekly PPV #76	TNA Asylum (Nashville Fairgrounds)	Nashville, Tennessee	Michael Shane (c) vs. Chris Sabin vs. Christopher Daniels vs. Low Ki in an Ultimate X match for the NWA TNA X Championship
January 14	Weekly PPV #77	TNA Asylum (Nashville Fairgrounds)	Nashville, Tennessee	A.J. Styles and Erik Watts vs. Abyss and Jeff Jarrett
January 21	Weekly PPV #78	TNA Asylum (Nashville Fairgrounds)	Nashville, Tennessee	Jeff Jarrett (c) vs. El León in a street fight for the NWA World Heavyweight Championship
January 28	Weekly PPV #79	TNA Asylum (Nashville Fairgrounds)	Nashville, Tennessee	Don Callis vs. Erik Watts in a Loser Leaves TNA match
February 4	Weekly PPV #80	TNA Asylum (Nashville Fairgrounds)	Nashville, Tennessee	Jeff Jarrett (c) vs. Dustin Rhodes for the NWA World Heavyweight Championship
February 11	Weekly PPV #81: America's X Cup Part I	TNA Asylum (Nashville Fairgrounds)	Nashville, Tennessee	Team Mexico (Abismo Negro, Hector Garza, Juventud Guerrera and Mr. Águila) vs. Team TNA (Chris Sabin, Elix Skipper, Jerry Lynn and Sonjay Dutt) in the TNA America's X Cup Tournament Finals
February 18	Weekly PPV #82	TNA Asylum (Nashville Fairgrounds)	Nashville, Tennessee	Chris Harris vs. Jeff Jarrett
February 25	Weekly PPV #83	TNA Asylum (Nashville Fairgrounds)	Nashville, Tennessee	A.J. Styles vs. Abyss in a tables match for sole control of the NWA World Tag Team Championship
March 3	Weekly PPV #84	TNA Asylum (Nashville Fairgrounds)	Nashville, Tennessee	Chris Harris vs. Shane Douglas
March 3 (aired March 10)	Weekly PPV #85: America's X Cup Part II	TNA Asylum (Nashville Fairgrounds)	Nashville, Tennessee	David Young, Glen Gilberti and Kid Kash vs. 2 Tuff Tony and The Insane Clown Posse (Shaggy 2 Dope and Violent J)
March 17	Weekly PPV #86	TNA Asylum (Nashville Fairgrounds)	Nashville, Tennessee	Jeff Jarrett vs. Chris Harris for the NWA World Heavyweight Championship
March 24	Weekly PPV #87	TNA Asylum (Nashville Fairgrounds)	Nashville, Tennessee	The Amazing Red vs. Elix Skipper vs. Jerry Lynn vs. Kazarian vs. Nosawa vs. Petey Williams in a six-way elimination match to determine the number one contender to the NWA TNA X Championship
March 31	Weekly PPV #88	TNA Asylum (Nashville Fairgrounds)	Nashville, Tennessee	Abyss vs. A.J. Styles vs. Raven vs. Ron Killings
March 31 (aired April 7)	Weekly PPV #89: America's X Cup Part III	TNA Asylum (Nashville Fairgrounds)	Nashville, Tennessee	Dallas and Kid Kash vs. Christopher Daniels and Low Ki in the finals of the NWA World Tag Team Championship tournament
April 14	Weekly PPV #90	TNA Asylum (Nashville Fairgrounds)	Nashville, Tennessee	Chris Harris vs. Raven to determine the number one contender by the NWA World Heavyweight Championship
April 21	Weekly PPV #91	TNA Asylum (Nashville Fairgrounds)	Nashville, Tennessee	Jeff Jarrett (c) vs. A.J. Styles in a steel cage match for the NWA World Heavyweight Championship
April 28	Weekly PPV #92	TNA Asylum (Nashville Fairgrounds)	Nashville, Tennessee	A.J. Styles (c) vs. Ron Killings for the NWA World Heavyweight Championship
May 5	Weekly PPV #93	TNA Asylum (Nashville Fairgrounds)	Nashville, Tennessee	A.J. Styles (c) vs. Raven for the NWA World Heavyweight Championship
May 12	Weekly PPV #94	TNA Asylum (Nashville Fairgrounds)	Nashville, Tennessee	A.J. Styles (c) vs. Chris Harris for the NWA World Heavyweight Championship
May 19	Weekly PPV #95	TNA Asylum (Nashville Fairgrounds)	Nashville, Tennessee	A.J. Styles (c) vs. Chris Harris vs. Raven vs. Ron Killings for the NWA World Heavyweight Championship
May 26	Weekly PPV #96: World X Cup	TNA Asylum (Nashville Fairgrounds)	Nashville, Tennessee	Chris Sabin vs. Hector Garza vs. Petey Williams in the finals of the World X Cup
June 2	Weekly PPV #97	TNA Asylum (Nashville Fairgrounds)	Nashville, Tennessee	Ron Killings (c) vs. A.J. Styles vs. Chris Harris vs. Jeff Jarrett vs. Raven in a King of the Mountain match for the NWA World Heavyweight Championship
June 9	Weekly PPV #98	TNA Asylum (Nashville Fairgrounds)	Nashville, Tennessee	Kazarian (c) vs. A.J. Styles for the TNA X Division Championship
June 16	Weekly PPV #99	TNA Asylum (Nashville Fairgrounds)	Nashville, Tennessee	Team Canada (Bobby Roode, Eric Young and Petey Williams) vs. Team TNA (Chris Sabin, Elix Skipper and Jerry Lynn) in a flag match
June 23	Weekly PPV #100: 2nd Anniversary Show	TNA Asylum (Nashville Fairgrounds)	Nashville, Tennessee	Jeff Jarrett (c) vs. Ron Killings for the NWA World Heavyweight Championship
June 30	Weekly PPV #101	TNA Asylum (Nashville Fairgrounds)	Nashville, Tennessee	A.J. Styles vs. Chris Sabin vs. Elix Skipper vs. Kazarian vs. Michael Shane vs. The Amazing Red for the TNA X Division Championship
July 7	Weekly PPV #102	TNA Asylum (Nashville Fairgrounds)	Nashville, Tennessee	8-man Gauntlet for the Gold for the NWA World Heavyweight Championship
July 14	Weekly PPV #103	TNA Asylum (Nashville Fairgrounds)	Nashville, Tennessee	America's Most Wanted (Chris Harris and James Storm) vs. The Naturals (Andy Douglas and Chase Stevens) in a ladder match for AMW's Jackets
July 21	Weekly PPV #104	TNA Asylum (Nashville Fairgrounds)	Nashville, Tennessee	The Naturals (Andy Douglas and Chase Stevens) (c) vs. America's Most Wanted (Chris Harris and James Storm) in a steel cage match for the NWA World Tag Team Championship
July 28	Weekly PPV #105	TNA Asylum (Nashville Fairgrounds)	Nashville, Tennessee	A.J. Styles (c) vs. Frankie Kazarian vs. Michael Shane in an Ultimate X match for the TNA X Division Championship
August 4	Weekly PPV #106	TNA Asylum (Nashville Fairgrounds)	Nashville, Tennessee	A.J. Styles vs. Kid Kash
August 11	Weekly PPV #107	TNA Asylum (Nashville Fairgrounds)	Nashville, Tennessee	22-man Gauntlet for the Gold for the TNA X Division Championship
August 18	Weekly PPV #108	TNA Asylum (Nashville Fairgrounds)	Nashville, Tennessee	A.J. Styles vs. Kid Kash in a street fight
August 25	Weekly PPV #109	TNA Asylum (Nashville Fairgrounds)	Nashville, Tennessee	A.J. Styles, Jeff Hardy and Ron Killings vs. Dallas, Kid Kash and Monty Brown
September 1	Weekly PPV #110	TNA Asylum (Nashville Fairgrounds)	Nashville, Tennessee	A.J. Styles and Ron Killings vs. Dallas and Kid Kash in a street fight
September 8	Weekly PPV #111	TNA Asylum (Nashville Fairgrounds)	Nashville, Tennessee	Jeff Jarrett (c) vs. Jeff Hardy for the NWA World Heavyweight Championship
(c) – refers to the champion(s) heading into the match

- Note – In November 2004, TNA discontinued their weekly pay-per-views and began promoting monthly pay-per-view events.

== Monthly pay-per-view and livestreaming events (2004–present) ==
=== 2000s ===
==== 2004 ====
Date	Event	Venue	Location	ATN	Main event	Ref.
November 7	Victory Road	Impact Zone	Orlando, Florida	700	Jeff Jarrett (c) vs. Jeff Hardy in a Ladder match for the NWA World Heavyweight Championship	
December 5	Turning Point	Impact Zone	Orlando, Florida	700	America's Most Wanted (Chris Harris and James Storm) vs. Triple X (Christopher Daniels and Elix Skipper) in a "Losers Must Split Up" Steel Cage match	
(c) – refers to the champion(s) heading into the match

==== 2005 ====
Date	Event	Venue	Location	ATN	Main event	Ref.
January 16	Final Resolution	Impact Zone	Orlando, Florida	875	Jeff Jarrett (c) vs. Monty Brown for the NWA World Heavyweight Championship	
February 13	Against All Odds	Impact Zone	Orlando, Florida	775	Jeff Jarrett (c) vs. Kevin Nash for the NWA World Heavyweight Championship	
March 13	Destination X	Impact Zone	Orlando, Florida	775	Jeff Jarrett (c) vs. Diamond Dallas Page in a Ringside Revenge match for the NWA World Heavyweight Championship	
April 24	Lockdown	Impact Zone	Orlando, Florida	775	A.J. Styles vs. Abyss in a Steel Cage match to determine the number one contender to the NWA World Heavyweight Championship	
May 15	Hard Justice	Impact Zone	Orlando, Florida	775	Jeff Jarrett (c) vs. A.J. Styles for the NWA World Heavyweight Championship	
June 19	Slammiversary	Impact Zone	Orlando, Florida	775	A.J. Styles (c) vs. Abyss vs. Monty Brown vs. Sean Waltman vs. Raven in a King of the Mountain match for the NWA World Heavyweight Championship	
July 17	No Surrender	Impact Zone	Orlando, Florida	775	Raven vs. Abyss in a No Surrender Dog Collar match for the NWA World Heavyweight Championship	
August 14	Sacrifice	Impact Zone	Orlando, Florida	775	Raven and Sabu vs. Jeff Jarrett and Rhino	
September 11	Unbreakable	Impact Zone	Orlando, Florida	775	Christopher Daniels (c) vs. A.J. Styles vs. Samoa Joe in a three-way match for the TNA X Division Championship	
October 23	Bound for Glory	Impact Zone	Orlando, Florida	900	Jeff Jarrett (c) vs. Rhino for the NWA World Heavyweight Championship	
November 13	Genesis	Impact Zone	Orlando, Florida	900	Team 3D (Brother Ray and Brother Devon) and Rhino vs. America's Most Wanted (Chris Harris and James Storm) and Jeff Jarrett	
December 11	Turning Point	Impact Zone	Orlando, Florida	900	Jeff Jarrett (c) vs. Rhino for the NWA World Heavyweight Championship	
(c) – refers to the champion(s) heading into the match

==== 2006 ====
Date	Event	Venue	Location	ATN	Main event	Notes	Ref.
January 15	Final Resolution	Impact Zone	Orlando, Florida	900	Sting and Christian Cage vs. Jeff Jarrett and Monty Brown		
February 12	Against All Odds	Impact Zone	Orlando, Florida	775	Jeff Jarrett (c) vs. Christian Cage for the NWA World Heavyweight Championship		
March 12	Destination X	Impact Zone	Orlando, Florida	900	Christian Cage (c) vs. Monty Brown for the NWA World Heavyweight Championship		
April 23	Lockdown	Impact Zone	Orlando, Florida	900	Sting's Warriors (Sting, A.J. Styles, Ron Killings, and Rhino) vs. Jarrett's Army (Jeff Jarrett, Scott Steiner, and America's Most Wanted (Chris Harris and James Storm)) in a Lethal Lockdown match		
May 14	Sacrifice	Impact Zone	Orlando, Florida	900	Christian Cage (c) vs. Abyss in a Full Metal Mayhem match for the NWA World Heavyweight Championship		
June 18	Slammiversary	Impact Zone	Orlando, Florida	900	Christian Cage (c) vs. Abyss vs. Sting vs. Jeff Jarrett vs. Ron Killings in a King of the Mountain match for the NWA World Heavyweight Championship		
July 16	Victory Road	Impact Zone	Orlando, Florida	900	Sting vs. Christian Cage vs. Samoa Joe vs. Scott Steiner in a four-way match to determine the number one contender to the NWA World Heavyweight Championship		
August 13	Hard Justice	Impact Zone	Orlando, Florida	900	Jeff Jarrett (c) vs. Sting for the NWA World Heavyweight Championship		
September 24	No Surrender	Impact Zone	Orlando, Florida	900	Jeff Jarrett vs. Samoa Joe in a Fan's Revenge Lumberjack match		
October 22	Bound for Glory	Compuware Sports Arena	Plymouth, Michigan	3,600	Jeff Jarrett (c) vs. Sting in a Title vs. Career match for the NWA World Heavyweight Championship	First PPV held outside of Universal Studios Florida	
November 19	Genesis	Impact Zone	Orlando, Florida	—	Kurt Angle vs. Samoa Joe		
December 10	Turning Point	Impact Zone	Orlando, Florida	—	Kurt Angle vs. Samoa Joe		
(c) – refers to the champion(s) heading into the match

==== 2007 ====
Date	Event	Venue	Location	ATN	Main event	Ref.
January 14	Final Resolution	Impact Zone	Orlando, Florida	—	Abyss (c) vs. Christian Cage vs. Sting in a three-way elimination match for the NWA World Heavyweight Championship	
February 11	Against All Odds	Impact Zone	Orlando, Florida	900	Christian Cage (c) vs. Kurt Angle for the NWA World Heavyweight Championship	
March 11	Destination X	Impact Zone	Orlando, Florida	900	Christian Cage (c) vs. Samoa Joe for the NWA World Heavyweight Championship	
April 15	Lockdown	Family Arena	St. Charles, Missouri	6,000	Team Angle (Kurt Angle, Samoa Joe, Sting, Rhino, and Jeff Jarrett) vs. Team Cage (Christian Cage, A.J. Styles, Abyss, Scott Steiner, and Tomko) in a Lethal Lockdown match	
May 13	Sacrifice	Impact Zone	Orlando, Florida	900	Christian Cage vs. Kurt Angle vs. Sting in a three-way match for the inaugural TNA World Heavyweight Championship	
June 17	Slammiversary	Nashville Municipal Auditorium	Nashville, Tennessee	3,500	Kurt Angle vs. A.J. Styles vs. Samoa Joe vs. Christian Cage vs. Chris Harris in a King of the Mountain match for the vacant TNA World Heavyweight Championship	
July 15	Victory Road	Impact Zone	Orlando, Florida	900	Kurt Angle (World) and Samoa Joe (X Division) vs. Team 3D (Brother Ray and Brother Devon) (Tag Team) in a Winner Takes All match for the TNA World Heavyweight Championship, TNA X Division Championship, and TNA World Tag Team Championship	
August 12	Hard Justice	Impact Zone	Orlando, Florida	900	Kurt Angle (TNA, IWGP) vs. Samoa Joe (X Division, Tag Team) in a Winner Takes All match for the TNA World Heavyweight Championship, IWGP Heavyweight Championship, TNA X Division Championship, and TNA World Tag Team Championship	
September 9	No Surrender	Impact Zone	Orlando, Florida	900	Kurt Angle (c) vs. Abyss for the TNA World Heavyweight Championship	
October 14	Bound for Glory	Arena at Gwinnett Center	Duluth, Georgia	4,000	Kurt Angle (c) vs. Sting for the TNA World Heavyweight Championship	
November 11	Genesis	Impact Zone	Orlando, Florida	900	Kurt Angle (c) and Kevin Nash vs. Sting and Booker T for the TNA World Heavyweight Championship	
December 2	Turning Point	Impact Zone	Orlando, Florida	900	Samoa Joe, Kevin Nash, and Eric Young vs. The Angle Alliance (Kurt Angle, A.J. Styles, and Tomko)	
(c) – refers to the champion(s) heading into the match

==== 2008 ====
Date	Event	Venue	Location	ATN	Main event	Ref.
January 6	Final Resolution	Impact Zone	Orlando, Florida	900	Kurt Angle (c) vs. Christian Cage for the TNA World Heavyweight Championship	
February 10	Against All Odds	BI-LO Center	Greenville, South Carolina	3,500	Kurt Angle (c) vs. Christian Cage for the TNA World Heavyweight Championship	
March 9	Destination X	Norfolk Scope	Norfolk, Virginia	3,200	The Unlikely Alliance (Christian Cage, Kevin Nash, and Samoa Joe) vs. The Angle Alliance (Kurt Angle, A.J. Styles, and Tomko)	
April 13	Lockdown	Tsongas Arena	Lowell, Massachusetts	5,500	Kurt Angle (c) vs. Samoa Joe in a Steel Cage match for the TNA World Heavyweight Championship	
May 11	Sacrifice	Impact Zone	Orlando, Florida	900	Samoa Joe (c) vs. Scott Steiner vs. Kaz in a three-way match for the TNA World Heavyweight Championship	
June 8	Slammiversary	DeSoto Civic Center	Southaven, Mississippi	2,000	Samoa Joe (c) vs. Christian Cage vs. Booker T vs. Rhino vs. Robert Roode in a King of the Mountain match for the TNA World Heavyweight Championship	
July 13	Victory Road	Reliant Arena	Houston, Texas	3,000	Samoa Joe (c) vs. Booker T for the TNA World Heavyweight Championship	
August 10	Hard Justice	Sovereign Bank Arena	Trenton, New Jersey	3,500	Samoa Joe (c) vs. Booker T in a Steel Cage Weapons match for the TNA World Heavyweight Championship	
September 14	No Surrender	General Motors Centre	Oshawa, Ontario, Canada	3,500	Samoa Joe (c) vs. Christian Cage vs. Kurt Angle in a three-way match for the TNA World Heavyweight Championship	
October 12	Bound for Glory	Sears Centre	Hoffman Estates, Illinois	5,000–5,500	Samoa Joe (c) vs. Sting in a No Countout match for the TNA World Heavyweight Championship	
November 9	Turning Point	Impact Zone	Orlando, Florida	1,100	Sting (c) vs. A.J. Styles for the TNA World Heavyweight Championship	
December 7	Final Resolution	Impact Zone	Orlando, Florida	1,200	The Main Event Mafia (Sting (c), Kevin Nash, Booker T, and Scott Steiner) vs. The TNA Front Line (A.J. Styles, Samoa Joe, Brother Ray, and Brother Devon) for the TNA World Heavyweight Championship	
(c) – refers to the champion(s) heading into the match

==== 2009 ====
Date	Event	Venue	Location	ATN	Main event	Ref.
January 11	Genesis	Bojangles' Coliseum	Charlotte, North Carolina	2,700	Mick Foley and The TNA Front Line (A.J. Styles and Brother Devon) vs. Cute Kip and The Main Event Mafia (Booker T and Scott Steiner) in a Hardcore match	
February 8	Against All Odds	Impact Zone	Orlando, Florida	1,100	Sting (c) vs. Kurt Angle vs. Brother Ray vs. Brother Devon in a four-way match for the TNA World Heavyweight Championship	
March 15	Destination X	Impact Zone	Orlando, Florida	1,100	Sting (c) vs. Kurt Angle for the TNA World Heavyweight Championship	
April 19	Lockdown	Liacouras Center	Philadelphia, Pennsylvania	4,500	Sting (c) vs. Mick Foley in a Steel Cage match for the TNA World Heavyweight Championship	
May 24	Sacrifice	Impact Zone	Orlando, Florida	1,100	Sting vs. Mick Foley vs. Kurt Angle vs. Jeff Jarrett in an "Ultimate Sacrifice" match	
June 21	Slammiversary Seven	The Palace of Auburn Hills	Auburn Hills, Michigan	4,000	Mick Foley (c) vs. Kurt Angle vs. Jeff Jarrett vs. A.J. Styles vs. Samoa Joe in a King of the Mountain match for the TNA World Heavyweight Championship	
July 19	Victory Road	Impact Zone	Orlando, Florida	1,100	Kurt Angle (c) vs. Mick Foley for the TNA World Heavyweight Championship	
August 16	Hard Justice	Impact Zone	Orlando, Florida	1,100	Kurt Angle (c) vs. Sting vs. Matt Morgan in a three-way match for the TNA World Heavyweight Championship	
September 20	No Surrender	Impact Zone	Orlando, Florida	1,100	Kurt Angle (c) vs. A.J. Styles vs. Sting vs. Matt Morgan vs. Hernandez in a five-way match for the TNA World Heavyweight Championship	
October 18	Bound for Glory	Bren Events Center	Irvine, California	2,400	A.J. Styles (c) vs. Sting for the TNA World Heavyweight Championship	
November 15	Turning Point	Impact Zone	Orlando, Florida	1,100	A.J. Styles (c) vs. Daniels vs. Samoa Joe in a three-way match for the TNA World Heavyweight Championship	
December 20	Final Resolution	Impact Zone	Orlando, Florida	1,200	A.J. Styles (c) vs. Daniels for the TNA World Heavyweight Championship	
(c) – refers to the champion(s) heading into the match

=== 2010s ===
==== 2010 ====
Date	Event	Venue	Location	ATN	Main event	Ref.
January 17	Genesis	Impact Zone	Orlando, Florida	1,100	A.J. Styles (c) vs. Kurt Angle for the TNA World Heavyweight Championship	
February 14	Against All Odds	Impact Zone	Orlando, Florida	1,100	D'Angelo Dinero vs. Mr. Anderson in the 8 Card Stud Tournament final	
March 21	Destination X	Impact Zone	Orlando, Florida	1,100	A.J. Styles (c) vs. Abyss for the TNA World Heavyweight Championship	
April 18	Lockdown	Family Arena	St. Charles, Missouri	3,023	Team Flair (Sting, Desmond Wolfe, James Storm, and Robert Roode) vs. Team Hogan (Abyss, Jeff Hardy, Jeff Jarrett, and Rob Van Dam) in a Lethal Lockdown match	
May 16	Sacrifice	Impact Zone	Orlando, Florida	1,100	Rob Van Dam (c) vs. A.J. Styles for the TNA World Heavyweight Championship	
June 13	Slammiversary	Impact Zone	Orlando, Florida	1,100	Rob Van Dam (c) vs. Sting for the TNA World Heavyweight Championship	
July 11	Victory Road	Impact Zone	Orlando, Florida	1,100	Rob Van Dam (c) vs. Abyss vs. Jeff Hardy vs. Mr. Anderson in a four-way match for the TNA World Heavyweight Championship	
August 8	Hardcore Justice	Impact Zone	Orlando, Florida	1,100	Rob Van Dam vs. Sabu	
September 5	No Surrender	Impact Zone	Orlando, Florida	1,100	Mr. Anderson vs. D'Angelo Dinero in the TNA World Heavyweight Championship Tournament semifinals	
October 10	Bound for Glory	Ocean Center	Daytona Beach, Florida	3,500	Jeff Hardy vs. Kurt Angle vs. Mr. Anderson in a three-way match for the vacant TNA World Heavyweight Championship	
November 7	Turning Point	Impact Zone	Orlando, Florida	1,100	Jeff Hardy (c) vs. Matt Morgan for the TNA World Heavyweight Championship	
December 5	Final Resolution	Impact Zone	Orlando, Florida	1,100	Jeff Hardy (c) vs. Matt Morgan for the TNA World Heavyweight Championship	
(c) – refers to the champion(s) heading into the match

==== 2011 ====
Date	Event	Venue	Location	ATN	Main event	Notes	Ref.
January 9	Genesis	Impact Zone	Orlando, Florida	1,100	Jeff Hardy (c) vs. Mr. Anderson for the TNA World Heavyweight Championship		
February 13	Against All Odds	Impact Zone	Orlando, Florida	1,100	Mr. Anderson (c) vs. Jeff Hardy in a Ladder match for the TNA World Heavyweight Championship		
February 24 (taped January 4)	Global Impact 3	Tokyo Dome	Tokyo, Japan	—	Jeff Hardy (c) vs. Tetsuya Naito for the TNA World Heavyweight Championship	Co-produced with New Japan Pro-Wrestling	
March 13	Victory Road	Impact Zone	Orlando, Florida	1,100	Sting (c) vs. Jeff Hardy in a No Disqualification match for the TNA World Heavyweight Championship		
April 17	Lockdown	U.S. Bank Arena	Cincinnati, Ohio	4,000	Fortune (Christopher Daniels, Kazarian, James Storm, and Robert Roode) vs. Immortal (Ric Flair, Abyss, Bully Ray, and Matt Hardy) in a Lethal Lockdown match		
May 15	Sacrifice	Impact Zone	Orlando, Florida	1,100	Sting (c) vs. Rob Van Dam for the TNA World Heavyweight Championship		
June 12	Slammiversary	Impact Zone	Orlando, Florida	1,100	Kurt Angle vs. Jeff Jarrett to determine the number one contender to the TNA World Heavyweight Championship and for Angle's gold medal		
July 10	Destination X	Impact Zone	Orlando, Florida	1,100	A.J. Styles vs. Christopher Daniels		
August 7	Hardcore Justice	Impact Zone	Orlando, Florida	1,100	Sting (c) vs. Kurt Angle for the TNA World Heavyweight Championship		
September 11	No Surrender	Impact Zone	Orlando, Florida	1,100	Kurt Angle (c) vs. Sting vs. Mr. Anderson for the TNA World Heavyweight Championship		
October 16	Bound for Glory	Liacouras Center	Philadelphia, Pennsylvania	3,585	Kurt Angle (c) vs. Bobby Roode for the TNA World Heavyweight Championship		
November 13	Turning Point	Impact Zone	Orlando, Florida	1,100	Bobby Roode (c) vs. A.J. Styles for the TNA World Heavyweight Championship		
December 11	Final Resolution	Impact Zone	Orlando, Florida	1,100	Bobby Roode (c) vs. A.J. Styles in an Iron Man match for the TNA World Heavyweight Championship		
(c) – refers to the champion(s) heading into the match

==== 2012 ====
Date	Event	Venue	Location	ATN	Main event	Ref.
January 8	Genesis	Impact Zone	Orlando, Florida	1,100	Bobby Roode (c) vs. Jeff Hardy for the TNA World Heavyweight Championship	
February 12	Against All Odds	Impact Zone	Orlando, Florida	1,100	Bobby Roode (c) vs. Jeff Hardy vs. James Storm vs. Bully Ray for the TNA World Heavyweight Championship	
March 18	Victory Road	Impact Zone	Orlando, Florida	1,100	Bobby Roode vs. Sting in a No Holds Barred match	
April 15	Lockdown	Nashville Municipal Auditorium	Nashville, Tennessee	3,000	Bobby Roode (c) vs. James Storm in a Steel Cage match for the TNA World Heavyweight Championship	
May 13	Sacrifice	Impact Zone (Universal Studios Florida)	Orlando, Florida	1,100	Bobby Roode (c) vs. Rob Van Dam in a Ladder match for the TNA World Heavyweight Championship	
June 10	Slammiversary	College Park Center	Arlington, Texas	5,500	Bobby Roode (c) vs. Sting for the TNA World Heavyweight Championship	
July 8	Destination X	Impact Zone	Orlando, Florida	1,100	Bobby Roode (c) vs. Austin Aries for the TNA World Heavyweight Championship	
August 12	Hardcore Justice	Impact Zone	Orlando, Florida	1,100	Austin Aries (c) vs. Bobby Roode for the TNA World Heavyweight Championship	
September 9	No Surrender	Impact Zone	Orlando, Florida	1,100	Jeff Hardy vs. Bully Ray in the final of the Bound for Glory Series	
October 14	Bound for Glory	GCU Arena	Phoenix, Arizona	2,900	Austin Aries (c) vs. Jeff Hardy for the TNA World Heavyweight Championship	
November 11	Turning Point	Impact Zone	Orlando, Florida	1,100	Jeff Hardy (c) vs. Austin Aries in a Ladder match for the TNA World Heavyweight Championship	
December 9	Final Resolution	Impact Zone	Orlando, Florida	1,100	Jeff Hardy (c) vs. Bobby Roode for the TNA World Heavyweight Championship	
(c) – refers to the champion(s) heading into the match

==== 2013 ====
Beginning April 2013, TNA began offering pre-recorded pay-per-view events to consumers under the brand name "One Night Only"; this was preceded by a decrease in the number of live pay-per-view events produced by the promotion.

One Night Only branded event

Date	Event	Venue	Location	ATN	Main event	Ref.
January 13	Genesis	Impact Zone	Orlando, Florida	1,100	Jeff Hardy (c) vs. Austin Aries vs. Bobby Roode in a three-way elimination match for the TNA World Heavyweight Championship	
March 10	Lockdown	Alamodome	San Antonio, Texas	7,200	Jeff Hardy (c) vs. Bully Ray in a Steel Cage match for the TNA World Heavyweight Championship	
April 5 (taped January 12)	X-Travaganza	Impact Zone	Orlando, Florida	1,400	Austin Aries vs. Samoa Joe	
May 3 (taped January 12)	Joker's Wild	Impact Zone	Orlando, Florida	1,400	$100,000 Joker's Wild gauntlet battle royal	
June 2	Slammiversary	Agganis Arena	Boston, Massachusetts	3,800	Bully Ray (c) vs. Sting in a No Holds Barred match for the TNA World Heavyweight Championship	
July 5 (taped March 19)	Hardcore Justice 2	Impact Zone	Orlando, Florida	1,400	Jeff Hardy and Brother Runt vs. Team 3D (Bully Ray and Devon) in a Tables match	
August 2 (taped March 17)	10 Reunion	Impact Zone	Orlando, Florida	1,400	Kurt Angle vs. Samoa Joe	
September 6 (taped March 17)	Knockouts Knockdown	Impact Zone	Orlando, Florida	1,400	9-woman Queen of the Knockouts gauntlet battle royal	
October 20	Bound for Glory	Viejas Arena	San Diego, California	3,000	Bully Ray (c) vs. A.J. Styles in a No Disqualification match for the TNA World Heavyweight Championship	
November 1 (taped March 19)	Tournament of Champions	Impact Zone	Orlando, Florida	1,400	Bobby Roode vs. Samoa Joe in the Tournament of Champions final	
December 6 (taped March 18)	World Cup	Impact Zone	Orlando, Florida	1,400	Team USA (Christopher Daniels, James Storm, Kazarian, Kenny King, and Mickie James) vs. Team Aces & Eights (D.O.C., Knux, Mr. Anderson, Wes Brisco, and Ivelisse) in the World Cup final	
(c) – refers to the champion(s) heading into the match

==== 2014 ====
One Night Only branded event

Date	Event	Venue	Location	ATN	Main event	Notes	Ref.
January 3 (taped March 18, 2013)	Tag Team Tournament	Impact Zone	Orlando, Florida	1,400	Team 3D (Bully Ray and Devon) vs. Austin Aries and Bobby Roode in the Tag Team Tournament final		
January 10 (taped December 29, 2013)	Hardcore Justice 3	Lowell Memorial Auditorium	Lowell, Massachusetts	1,000	Team Angle (Kurt Angle, Samoa Joe, James Storm, and Abyss) vs. Team Roode (Bobby Roode, Robbie E, Jessie Godderz, and Magnus) in a Lethal Lockdown match		
February 7 (taped December 30, 2013)	#OldSchool	Mid-Hudson Civic Center	Poughkeepsie, New York	1,500	Magnus (c) vs. Samoa Joe for the TNA World Heavyweight Championship		
March 9	Lockdown	BankUnited Center	Coral Gables, Florida	—	Team MVP (MVP, Davey Richards, Eddie Edwards and Willow) vs. Team Dixie (Bobby Roode, Austin Aries, Jessie Godderz and Robbie E) in a Lethal Lockdown match		
April 27	Sacrifice	Impact Zone	Orlando, Florida	800	Eric Young (c) vs. Magnus for the TNA World Heavyweight Championship		
May 9 (taped February 2)	Joker's Wild 2	National Indoor Arena	Birmingham, England	3,000	$100,000 Joker's Wild gauntlet battle royal		
June 15	Slammiversary	College Park Center	Arlington, Texas	3,500	Eric Young (c) vs. Lashley vs. Austin Aries in a Steel Cage match for the TNA World Heavyweight Championship		
July 4 (taped March 2)	Global Impact Japan	Ryōgoku Kokugikan	Tokyo, Japan	5,800	Magnus (c) vs. Kai for the TNA World Heavyweight Championship	Co-produced with Wrestle-1	
August 1 (taped April 12)	X-Travaganza	Impact Zone	Orlando, Florida	1,100	Low Ki vs. Rashad Cameron vs. Ace Vedder vs. Sonjay Dutt in an Ultimate X match		
September 5 (taped April 12)	World Cup	Impact Zone	Orlando, Florida	1,100	Team Young (Eric Young, Bully Ray, Eddie Edwards, Gunner, and ODB) vs. Team EC3 (Ethan Carter III, Jessie Godderz, Robbie E, Magnus, and Gail Kim) in the World Cup final		
October 12	Bound for Glory	Korakuen Hall	Tokyo, Japan	1,500	The Great Muta and Tajiri vs. James Storm and The Great Sanada	Co-produced with Wrestle-1	
November 7 (taped May 10)	Knockouts Knockdown	Impact Zone	Orlando, Florida	1,100	8-woman Queen of the Knockouts gauntlet battle royal		
December 5 (taped May 10)	Victory Road	Impact Zone	Orlando, Florida	1,100	12-man battle royal to determine the number one contender to the TNA World Heavyweight Championship		
(c) – refers to the champion(s) heading into the match

==== 2015 ====
One Night Only branded event

Date	Event	Venue	Location	ATN	Main event	Ref.
January 9 (taped September 5, 2014)	Turning Point	John Paul Jones Arena	Charlottesville, Virginia	430	Jeff Hardy vs. MVP	
February 6 (taped September 6, 2014)	Rivals	Royal Palace Theatre	Roanoke Rapids, North Carolina	400	Jeff Hardy vs. Magnus	
March 6 (taped February 14)	Joker's Wild	Impact Zone	Orlando, Florida	1,100	$100,000 intergender Joker's Wild gauntlet battle royal	
April 1 (taped February 13)	Hardcore Justice	Impact Zone	Orlando, Florida	1,100	Bobby Roode vs. Lashley in a Last Man Standing match	
May 6 (taped February 15)	X-Travaganza	Impact Zone	Orlando, Florida	1,100	Rockstar Spud vs. Kenny King vs. DJZ vs. Crazzy Steve vs. Manik vs. Tigre Uno in an Ultimate X match	
June 28	Slammiversary	Impact Zone	Orlando, Florida	—	Drew Galloway vs. Jeff Jarrett vs. Matt Hardy vs. Bobby Roode vs. Eric Young in a King of the Mountain match for the vacant TNA World Heavyweight Championship	
July 1 (taped February 14)	Knockouts Knockdown	Impact Zone	Orlando, Florida	1,100	7-woman Queen of the Knockouts gauntlet battle royal	
August 5 (taped February 15)	World Cup	Impact Zone	Orlando, Florida	1,100	Team Hardy (Jeff Hardy, Gunner, Crazzy Steve, Rockstar Spud, Davey Richards and Gail Kim) vs. Team EC3 (Ethan Carter III, James Storm, Jessie Godderz, Robbie E, Tyrus and Awesome Kong) in a 12-person intergender elimination tag team match	
September 4 (taped February 16)	Gut Check	Impact Zone	Orlando, Florida	1,100	Tevita Fifita vs. Shaun Ricker vs. Martin Stone vs. Dalton Castle vs. Crimson in a five-way elimination match	
October 4	Bound for Glory	Cabarrus Arena	Concord, North Carolina	1,800	Ethan Carter III (c) vs. Drew Galloway vs. Matt Hardy for the TNA World Heavyweight Championship	
November 6 (taped February 16)	The TNA Classic	Impact Zone	Orlando, Florida	1,100	Gunner vs. Bram in the TNA Classic final	
December 4 (taped February 13)	Global Impact – USA vs. The World	Impact Zone	Orlando, Florida	1,100	The Great Muta vs. Mr. Anderson	
(c) – refers to the champion(s) heading into the match

==== 2016 ====
One Night Only branded event

Date	Event	Venue	Location	ATN	Main event	Ref.
January 8	Live!	Sands Bethlehem Event Center	Bethlehem, Pennsylvania	—	Beer Money, Inc. (Bobby Roode and James Storm) vs. Eric Young and Bram	
February 5 (taped January 5–7)	Rivals	Sands Bethlehem Event Center	Bethlehem, Pennsylvania	—	Mr. Anderson vs. Bram in a No Disqualification match	
March 4 (taped January 7–9)	Joker's Wild	Sands Bethlehem Event Center	Bethlehem, Pennsylvania	—	$100,000 Intergender Joker's Wild gauntlet battle royal	
March 4 (taped January 7–9)	Joker's Wild	Wembley Arena	London, England	—	$100,000 Intergender Joker's Wild gauntlet battle royal	
March 4 (taped January 7–9)	Joker's Wild	Barclaycard Arena	Birmingham, England	—	$100,000 Intergender Joker's Wild gauntlet battle royal	
April 22 (taped March 17)	Knockouts Knockdown	Impact Zone	Orlando, Florida	—	8-woman Queen of the Knockouts gauntlet battle royal	
May 20 (taped March 17–19)	Victory Road	Impact Zone	Orlando, Florida	—	Ethan Carter III vs. Eli Drake	
June 12	Slammiversary	Impact Zone	Orlando, Florida	—	Drew Galloway (c) vs. Lashley in a "Knockout or Tapout" match for the TNA World Heavyweight Championship	
July 22 (taped June 13)	World Cup	Impact Zone	Orlando, Florida	—	Team Hardy (Jeff Hardy, Eddie Edwards, Jessie Godderz, Robbie E, and Jade) vs. Team Bennett (Mike Bennett, Ethan Carter III, Grado, Crazzy Steve, and Rosemary) in a 10-person intergender elimination tag team match	
August 26 (taped July 13–14)	X-Travaganza	Impact Zone	Orlando, Florida	—	Braxton Sutter vs. DJZ vs. Chuck Taylor vs. Marshe Rockett vs. Eddie Edwards vs. Suicide vs. Crazzy Steve in an Ultimate X match to determine the number one contender to the TNA X Division Championship	
September 16 (taped August 11–14)	September	Impact Zone	Orlando, Florida	—	Lashley vs. Eddie Edwards	
October 2	Bound for Glory	Impact Zone	Orlando, Florida	1,100	Lashley (c) vs. Ethan Carter III in a No Holds Barred match for the TNA World Heavyweight Championship	
November 4 (taped August 16–17)	Against All Odds	Impact Zone	Orlando, Florida	—	Ethan Carter III vs. Matt Hardy	
December 12 (taped October 5)	December	Impact Zone	Orlando, Florida	—	Eddie Edwards vs. Mike Bennett	
(c) – refers to the champion(s) heading into the match

==== 2017 ====
One Night Only branded event

Date	Event	Venue	Location	ATN	Main event	Notes	Ref.
January 6	Live!	Impact Zone	Orlando, Florida	1,100	Eddie Edwards (c) vs. Ethan Carter III for the TNA World Heavyweight Championship		
February 10 (taped January 7)	Joker's Wild	Impact Zone	Orlando, Florida	—	$100,000 Intergender Joker's Wild gauntlet battle royal		
March 17 (taped January 8)	Rivals	Impact Zone	Orlando, Florida	—	Lashley vs. Jeff Hardy		
April 14 (taped March 3–4)	Victory Road – Knockouts Knockdown	Impact Zone	Orlando, Florida	—	Leva Bates, Alisha Edwards, Santana Garrett, and OBD vs. Laurel Van Ness, Rosemary, Angelina Love, and Diamanté		
May 11 taped April 22)	Turning Point	Impact Zone	Orlando, Florida	—	Lashley (c) vs. Moose for the Impact Wrestling World Heavyweight Championship		
June 16 (taped April 23)	No Surrender	Impact Zone	Orlando, Florida	—	Lashley (c) vs. Eddie Edwards for the Impact Wrestling World Heavyweight Championship		
July 2	Slammiversary	Impact Zone	Orlando, Florida	—	Lashley (Impact) vs. Alberto El Patrón (GFW) to unify the Impact Wrestling World Heavyweight Championship and GFW Global Championship		
August 11 (taped July 24, 2015)	GFW Amped Anthology – Part 1	Orleans Arena	Paradise, Nevada	—	Nick Aldis vs. Kongo Kong in a GFW Global Championship tournament quarterfinal match	Originally taped for Global Force Wrestling's weekly show Amped	
September 15 (taped July 25, 2015)	GFW Amped Anthology – Part 2	Orleans Arena	Paradise, Nevada	—	Bobby Roode vs. Eric Young in a GFW Global Championship tournament quarterfinal match	Originally taped for Global Force Wrestling's weekly show Amped	
October 13 (taped August 21, 2015)	GFW Amped Anthology – Part 3	Orleans Arena	Paradise, Nevada	—	Kongo Kong vs. Brian Myers vs. Kevin Kross to determine the number one contender to the GFW Global Championship	Originally taped for Global Force Wrestling's weekly show Amped	
November 5	Bound for Glory	Aberdeen Pavilion	Ottawa, Ontario, Canada	650	Eli Drake vs. Johnny Impact for the Impact Global Championship		
December 8 (taped October 23, 2015)	GFW Amped Anthology – Part 4	Orleans Arena	Paradise, Nevada	—	Nick Aldis vs. Bobby Roode in the GFW Global Championship tournament finals	Originally taped for Global Force Wrestling's weekly show Amped	
(c) – refers to the champion(s) heading into the match

==== 2018 ====
In 2018, Impact ceased offering their One Night Only events via pay-per-view providers and the events became Global Wrestling Network exclusives in collaboration with independent promotions. In 2018, Impact began offering free exclusive events on Twitch in collaboration with independent promotions.

Twitch special event	Global Wrestling Network One Night Only event

Date	Event	Venue	Location	ATN	Main event	Notes	Ref.
January 10 (taped October 14, October 21, 2017)	Collision in Oklahoma	Firelake Arena	Shawnee, Oklahoma	—	Alberto El Patrón vs. Lashley in a No Disqualification match	Co-produced with Imperial Wrestling Revolution and Border City Wrestling	
January 10 (taped October 14, October 21, 2017)	Collision in Oklahoma	St. Clair College Sportsplex	Windsor, Ontario, Canada	—	Alberto El Patrón vs. Lashley in a No Disqualification match	Co-produced with Imperial Wrestling Revolution and Border City Wrestling	
January 18 (taped November 9, 2017)	Barbed Wire Massacre III	Aberdeen Pavilion	Ottawa, Ontario, Canada	—	Latin American Xchange (Homicide, Santana, and Ortiz) vs. Ohio Versus Everything (Dave Crist, Jake Crist, and Sami Callihan) in a Barbed Wire Massacre		
February 9 (taped February 3)	Brace for Impact	Rahway Recreation Center	Rahway, New Jersey	—	Tenille Dashwood vs. Angelina Love	Co-produced with WrestlePro	
February 16 (taped October 14, November 7, December 3, 2017)	Canadian Clash	St. Clair College Sportsplex	Windsor, Ontario, Canada	—	Alberto El Patrón vs. James Storm	Co-produced with Border City Wrestling	
February 16 (taped October 14, November 7, December 3, 2017)	Canadian Clash	Aberdeen Pavilion	Ottawa, Ontario, Canada	—	Alberto El Patrón vs. James Storm	Co-produced with Border City Wrestling	
February 16 (taped October 14, November 7, December 3, 2017)	Canadian Clash	Diamondback Saloon	Belleville, Michigan	—	Alberto El Patrón vs. James Storm	Co-produced with Border City Wrestling	
March 9 (taped March 4)	Last Chancery	Don Kolov Arena	Mississauga, Ontario, Canada	—	Austin Aries (c) vs. Matt Sydal vs. Kongo Kong in a three-way match for the Impact World Championship	Co-produced with Border City Wrestling and Destiny World Wrestling	
March 16 (taped March 3)	March Breakdown	St. Clair College Sportsplex	Windsor, Ontario, Canada	—	Austin Aries and Alberto El Patrón vs. Kongo Kong and RJ City	Co-produced with Border City Wrestling	
April 6	Impact Wrestling vs. Lucha Underground	Sugar Mill	New Orleans, Louisiana	—	Austin Aries vs. Pentagón Dark vs. Fénix in a three-way match	Co-produced with Lucha Underground Held in conjunction with WrestleCon	
April 22	Redemption	Impact Zone	Orlando, Florida	—	Austin Aries (c) vs. Fénix vs. Pentagón Jr. in a three-way match for the Impact World Championship		
May 5	Penta Does Iowa	Val Air Ballroom	Des Moines, Iowa	—	Eli Drake vs. Clayton Gainz	Co-produced with Wrestling Revolver	
May 11 (taped March 24)	Cali Combat	Salinas Pal Armory	Salinas, California	900	Austin Aries (c) vs. Eli Drake for the Impact World Championship	Co-produced with Kirk White's Big Time Wrestling	
June 15 (taped June 3)	Zero Fear	Don Kolov Arena	Mississauga, Ontario, Canada	300–500	Eli Drake vs. Moose vs. Pentagón Jr. in a three-way match		
July 7	Rise of the Knockouts	Illinois Basketball Academy	Naperville, Illinois	—	Tessa Blanchard vs. Mercedes Martinez in a 30-minute Iron Man match for the vacant Phoenix of Rise Championship	Co-produced with Rise Wrestling	
July 22	Slammiversary XVI	The Rebel Complex	Toronto, Ontario, Canada	3,700	Austin Aries (c) vs. Moose for the Impact World Championship		
July 29	Confrontation	Triad Stage	Greensboro, North Carolina	—	Caleb Konley (c) vs. Matt Sydal for the AML Championship	Co-produced with America's Most Liked Wrestling	
August 19	Uncivil War	Knoxville Convention Center	Knoxville, Tennessee	—	Sami Callihan vs. Matt Cross	Co-produced with Next Generation Wrestling	
August 31 (taped August 25)	Bad Intentions	Don Kolov Arena	Mississauga, Ontario, Canada	400–600	Josh Alexander vs. Sami Callihan in a Steel Cage match to determine the number one contender to the Destiny World Wrestling Championship	Co-produced with Destiny Pro Wrestling	
September 9	Impact Wrestling vs. The UK	Bowlers Exhibition Centre	Manchester, England	—	Sami Callihan vs. Jimmy Havoc in a Barbed Wire Baseball Bat Death match	Held as part of Wrestling MediaCon	
September 14 (taped August 25)	Night of the Dummies	American Legion Post 80	Binghamton, New York	400–600	Eddie Edwards vs. Eli Drake	Co-produced with Xcite Wrestling	
October 7	Motown Showdown	Diamondback Saloon	Belleville, Michigan	—	Johnny Impact vs. Moose	Co-produced with Border City Wrestling	
October 14	Bound for Glory	Melrose Ballroom	Queens, New York	2,000	Austin Aries (c) vs. Johnny Impact for the Impact World Championship		
November 16 (taped October 6)	BCW 25th Anniversary	St. Clair College Sportsplex	Windsor, Ontario, Canada	900–1,000	Kongo Kong (c) vs. Cody Deaner vs. Johnny Impact vs. Matt Sydal in a four-way match for the BCW Can-Am Heavyweight Championship	Co-produced with Border City Wrestling	
November 30	Gold Rush	Newark Pavilion	Newark, California	—	Johnny Impact (c) vs. Eli Drake for the Impact World Championship	Co-produced with Kirk White's Big Time Wrestling	
December 14	Ohio vs. Everything	Rockstar Pro Arena	Dayton, Ohio	—	oVe (Dave Crist, Jake Crist and Sami Callihan) vs. The Night Ryderz (Aaron Williams, Alex Colon and Dustin Rayz) in an oVe Rules six-man tag team match	Co-produced with Rockstar Pro Wrestling	
December 21 (taped December 1)	Back to Cali	Salinas Pal Youth Center	Salinas, California	900	Johnny Impact (c) vs. Moose for the Impact World Championship	Co-produced with Kirk White's Big Time Wrestling	
(c) – refers to the champion(s) heading into the match

==== 2019 ====
Beginning in April 2019, Impact Wrestling began holding select pay-per-view events that are sold exclusively through the FITE digital video streaming service and are not available for purchase via traditional pay-per-view providers. On May 1, Global Wrestling Network was discontinued alongside the One Night Only event series. In replacement of the service, the promotion launched Impact Plus, which hosts the new Monthly Specials.

Twitch special event	Global Wrestling Network One Night Only event	FITE exclusive event	Impact Plus exclusive event

Date	Event	Venue	Location	ATN	Main event	Notes	Ref.
January 6	Homecoming	The Asylum	Nashville, Tennessee	—	Johnny Impact (c) vs. Brian Cage for the Impact World Championship		
January 26	Battle of Brooklyn	St. Pats Cyo Sports	Bay Shore, New York	—	Dan Maff vs. Kongo Kong	Co-produced with WrestlePro	
February 2	Brace for Impact	London Music Hall	London, Ontario, Canada	—	Johnny Impact (c) vs. Sami Callihan for the Impact World Championship		
February 9 (taped January 26)	New Beginnings	Holy Family Academy	Hazleton, Pennsylvania	—	Johnny Impact (c) vs. Eli Drake for the Impact World Championship	Co-produced with Pennsylvania Premiere Wrestling	
March 2 (taped January 3)	Opening Day	Dayton Convention Center	Dayton, Ohio	—	Johnny Impact (c) vs. Larry D for the Impact World Championship	Co-produced with Rockstar Pro Wrestling	
March 9 (taped March 2)	Clash in the Bluegrass	Davis Arena	Louisville, Kentucky	—	Tony Gunn (c) vs. Sami Callihan for the OVW Heavyweight Championship	Co-produced with Ohio Valley Wrestling	
April 4	United We Stand	Rahway Recreation Center	Rahway, New Jersey	—	The Lucha Bros (Fénix and Pentagón Jr.) vs. Rob Van Dam and Sabu		
April 13	Critical Transformation	Owensboro Sportscenter	Owensboro, Kentucky	—	Johnny Impact (c) vs. Chris Michaels for the Impact World Championship	Co-produced with Universal Championship Wrestling	
April 28	Rebellion	The Rebel Complex	Toronto, Ontario, Canada	—	The Lucha Bros (Fénix and Pentagón Jr.) (c) vs. The Latin American Xchange (Santana and Ortiz) in a Full Metal Mayhem match for the Impact World Tag Team Championship		
May 5	Code Red	NYC Arena	New York City, New York	—	Sami Callihan vs. Tommy Dreamer in an oVe Rules match	Co-produced with House of Glory	
May 11 (taped April 12)	Salute to the Troops	Fort Campbell Army Post	Fort Campbell, Kentucky	—	Johnny Impact vs. Crazzy Steve	Co-produced with Tried-N-True Pro Wrestling	
June 8	A Night You Can't Mist	2300 Arena	Philadelphia, Pennsylvania	—	Johnny Impact and Michael Elgin vs. The Great Muta and Tommy Dreamer in a Tag team match	Co-produced with House of Hardcore	
June 9	Digital Destruction	Sports Arena	St. James, New York	—	Billy Gunn, Jordynne Grace and Tommy Dreamer vs. Johnny Impact, Moose and Taya Valkyrie	Co-produced with House of Hardcore	
July 5	Bash at the Brewery	Freetail Brewing Company	San Antonio, Texas	—	Rob Van Dam vs. Sami Callihan	Co-produced with River City Wrestling	
July 6	Deep Impact	World Gym Arena	Texas City, Texas	—	Rich Swann (X Division) vs. Ryan Davidson (ROW Heavyweight) for the Impact X Division Championship and ROW Heavyweight Championship	Co-produced with Reality of Wrestling	
July 7	Slammiversary XVII	Gilley's Dallas	Dallas, Texas	1,200	Sami Callihan vs. Tessa Blanchard		
August 2	Unbreakable	Santa Ana Esports Arena	Santa Ana, California	—	Sami Callihan vs. Tessa Blanchard to determine the number one contender for the Impact World Championship		
August 3	Star Struck	Florentine Gardens	Los Angeles, California	—	The North (Ethan Page and Josh Alexander) (c) vs. Rhino and Tommy Dreamer for the Impact World Tag Team Championship	Co-produced with United Wrestling Network and Championship Wrestling from Hollywood	
September 13	Operation Override	Comanche County Fairgrounds	Lawton, Oklahoma	—	Eddie Edwards vs. Sami Callihan	Co-produced with World Class Revolution	
September 14	Victory Road	Stride Bank Center	Enid, Oklahoma	—	Michael Elgin vs. TJP		
September 15	Lucha Invades NY	Hulu Theater at Madison Square Garden	New York City, New York	3,000	Blue Demon Jr. vs. Dr. Wagner Jr.	Co-produced with Lucha Libre AAA Worldwide	
October 4	Tales From The Ring 3	Val Air Ballroom	Des Moines, Iowa	—	Tessa Blanchard vs. Sami Callihan in an Iowa Street Fight	Co-produced with Wrestling Revolver	
October 18	Prelude to Glory	Palais Royale	South Bend, Indiana	—	Naomichi Marufuji, Rhino, and Rob Van Dam vs. The North (Ethan Page and Josh Alexander) and Michael Elgin		
October 19	All Glory	115 Bourbon Street	Merrionette Park, Illinois	—	Ace Romero vs. Larry D		
October 20	Bound for Glory	Odeum Expo Center	Villa Park, Illinois	3,200	Brian Cage (c) vs. Sami Callihan in a No Disqualification match for the Impact World Championship		
November 9	Turning Point	Holy Family Academy	Hazleton, Pennsylvania	—	Sami Callihan (c) vs. Brian Cage for the Impact World Championship		
November 11	Over Drive	The Marketplace at Steamtown	Scranton, Pennsylvania	—	Sami Callihan vs. Rhino in a Street Fight	Co-produced with Pennsylvania Premiere Wrestling	
December 7	No Surrender	The Brightside Music & Event Venue	Dayton, Ohio	—	Sami Callihan (c) vs. Rich Swann for the Impact World Championship		
December 8	Motown Showdown	Diamondback Saloon	Belleville, Michigan	—	Sami Callihan (c) vs. Rhino in a Street Fight for the Impact World Championship	Co-produced with Border City Wrestling	
(c) – refers to the champion(s) heading into the match

=== 2020s ===
==== 2020 ====
Impact Plus exclusive event	Twitch special event

Date	Event	Venue	Location	ATN	Main event	Notes	Ref.
January 10	Bash at the Brewery 2	Freetail Brewing Company	San Antonio, Texas	—	Ohio Versus Everything (Dave Crist, Jake Crist, Madman Fulton and Sami Callihan) vs. Brian Cage, Rich Swann, Tessa Blanchard and Willie Mack in an eight-person tag team elimination match	Co-produced with River City Wrestling	
January 11	Arlington Brawl	The Backyard	Arlington, Texas	—	Matthew Palmer vs. Andy Dalton		
January 12	Hard To Kill	The Bomb Factory	Dallas, Texas	—	Sami Callihan (c) vs. Tessa Blanchard for the Impact World Championship		
February 21	Outbreak	Ice Center	Lexington, Kentucky	—	Daga and Tessa Blanchard vs. Ace Austin and Jake Crist	Co-produced with Ohio Valley Wrestling	
February 22	Sacrifice	Davis Arena	Louisville, Kentucky	—	Tessa Blanchard vs. Ace Austin	Co-produced with Ohio Valley Wrestling	
July 18	Slammiversary	Skyway Studios	Nashville, Tennessee	0	Eric Young vs. Eddie Edwards vs. Rich Swann vs. Ace Austin vs. Trey Miguel in a five-way elimination match for the vacant Impact World Championship		
October 3	Victory Road	Skyway Studios	Nashville, Tennessee	0	Eric Young (c) vs. Eddie Edwards for the Impact World Championship		
October 24	Bound for Glory	Skyway Studios	Nashville, Tennessee	0	Eric Young (c) vs. Rich Swann for the Impact World Championship		
November 14	Turning Point	Skyway Studios	Nashville, Tennessee	0	Rich Swann (c) vs. Sami Callihan for the Impact World Championship		
December 12	Final Resolution	Skyway Studios	Nashville, Tennessee	0	Rich Swann (c) vs. Chris Bey for the Impact World Championship		
(c) – refers to the champion(s) heading into the match

==== 2021 ====
Impact Plus exclusive event

Date	Event	Venue	Location	ATN	Main event	Ref.
January 9	Genesis	Skyway Studios	Nashville, Tennessee	0	Willie Mack vs. Moose in an "I Quit" Match	
January 16	Hard To Kill	Skyway Studios	Nashville, Tennessee	0	Kenny Omega and The Good Brothers (Karl Anderson and Doc Gallows) vs. Rich Swann, Chris Sabin, and Moose	
February 13	No Surrender	Skyway Studios	Nashville, Tennessee	0	Rich Swann (c) vs. Tommy Dreamer for the Impact World Championship	
March 13	Sacrifice	Skyway Studios	Nashville, Tennessee	0	Rich Swann (Impact) vs. Moose (TNA) to unify the Impact World Championship and TNA World Heavyweight Championship	
April 10	Hardcore Justice	Skyway Studios	Nashville, Tennessee	0	Team Dreamer (Eddie Edwards, Rich Swann, Willie Mack, and Trey Miguel) vs. Violent By Design (Eric Young, Joe Doering, Deaner, and Rhino) in a Hardcore War	
April 25	Rebellion	Skyway Studios	Nashville, Tennessee	0	Kenny Omega (AEW) vs. Rich Swann (Impact) in a Winner Takes All match for the Impact World Championship and the AEW World Championship	
May 15	Under Siege	Skyway Studios	Nashville, Tennessee	0	Moose vs. Chris Sabin vs. Matt Cardona vs. Sami Callihan vs. Trey Miguel vs. Chris Bey in a six-way match to determine the number one contender for the Impact World Championship at Against All Odds	
June 12	Against All Odds	Skyway Studios	Nashville, Tennessee	0	Kenny Omega (c) vs. Moose for the Impact World Championship	
June 12	Against All Odds	Daily's Place	Jacksonville, Florida	0	Kenny Omega (c) vs. Moose for the Impact World Championship	
July 17	Slammiversary	Skyway Studios	Nashville, Tennessee	—	Kenny Omega (c) vs. Sami Callihan in a No Disqualification match for the Impact World Championship	
July 31	Homecoming	Skyway Studios	Nashville, Tennessee	—	Eddie Edwards vs. W. Morrissey in a Hardcore match	
August 20	Emergence	Skyway Studios	Nashville, Tennessee	—	Christian Cage (c) vs. Brian Myers for the Impact World Championship	
September 18	Victory Road	Skyway Studios	Nashville, Tennessee	—	Christian Cage (c) vs. Ace Austin for the Impact World Championship	
October 9 (taped September 17)	Knockouts Knockdown	Skyway Studios	Nashville, Tennessee	—	Decay (Rosemary and Havok) (c) vs. The Influence (Madison Rayne and Tenille Dashwood) for the Impact Knockouts Tag Team Championship	
October 23	Bound for Glory	Sam’s Town Live	Sunrise Manor, Nevada	—	Josh Alexander (c) vs. Moose for the Impact World Championship	
November 20	Turning Point	Sam's Town Live	Sunrise Manor, Nevada	—	Moose (c) vs. Eddie Edwards in a Full Metal Mayhem match for the Impact World Championship	
December 18	Throwback Throwdown II	Davis Arena	Louisville, Kentucky	—	Sex Ferguson (c) vs. Santa Claus in a North Pole Street Fight for the IPWF International Commonwealth Television Championship	
(c) – refers to the champion(s) heading into the match

==== 2022 ====
FITE exclusive event	Impact Plus exclusive event

Date	Event	Venue	Location	ATN	Main event	Notes	Ref.
January 8	Hard To Kill	The Factory in Deep Ellum	Dallas, Texas	—	Mickie James (c) vs. Deonna Purrazzo in a Texas Deathmatch for the Impact Knockouts World Championship		
February 19	No Surrender	Alario Center	Westwego, Louisiana	500	Team Impact (Chris Sabin, Rhino, Rich Swann, Steve Maclin, and Willie Mack) vs. Honor No More (Matt Taven, Mike Bennett, PCO, Vincent, and Kenny King)		
March 5	Sacrifice	Old Forester's Paristown Hall	Louisville, Kentucky	—	Moose (c) vs. Heath for the Impact World Championship		
April 1	Multiverse of Matches	Fairmont Dallas Hotel	Dallas, Texas	—	The Good Brothers (Doc Gallows and Karl Anderson) vs. The Briscoe Brothers (Jay Briscoe and Mark Briscoe)	Held as part of WrestleCon	
April 23	Rebellion	Mid-Hudson Civic Center	Poughkeepsie, New York	—	Moose (c) vs. Josh Alexander for the Impact World Championship		
May 7	Under Siege	Promowest Pavilion at Ovation	Newport, Kentucky	—	Josh Alexander (c) vs. Tomohiro Ishii for the Impact World Championship		
June 19	Slammiversary	The Asylum	Nashville, Tennessee	526	Josh Alexander (c) vs. Eric Young for the Impact World Championship		
July 1	Against All Odds	Center Stage Theater	Atlanta, Georgia	—	Josh Alexander (c) vs. Joe Doering for the Impact World Championship		
August 12	Emergence	Cicero Stadium	Cicero, Illinois	—	Josh Alexander (c) vs. Alex Shelley for the Impact World Championship		
September 23	Victory Road	Skyway Studios	Nashville, Tennessee	—	Moose vs. Sami Callihan vs. Steve Maclin in a Three-way Barbed Wire Massacre		
October 7	Bound for Glory	Washington Avenue Armory	Albany, New York	—	Josh Alexander (c) vs. Eddie Edwards for the Impact World Championship		
November 18	Over Drive	Old Forester's Paristown Hall	Louisville, Kentucky	—	Josh Alexander (c) vs. Frankie Kazarian for the Impact World Championship		
December 2 (taped November 25)	Throwback Throwdown III	Benton Convention Center	Winston-Salem, North Carolina	—	Team Impact Provincial Wrestling Federation (Colt McCoy, Tim Burr, Frank The Butcher, Giuseppe Scovelli Sr., and Giuseppe Scovelli Jr.) vs. Team Great Lakes Unionized Wrestling (Devon Damon, Neptune, Lord Humongous, and Manfred The Mad Mammal) in an 5-on-4 handicap elimination match	Held as part of WrestleCade	
(c) – refers to the champion(s) heading into the match

==== 2023 ====
FITE exclusive event	Impact Plus exclusive event

Date	Event	Venue	Location	ATN	Main event	Notes	Ref.
January 13	Hard To Kill	Center Stage Theater	Atlanta, Georgia	550	Jordynne Grace (c) vs. Mickie James in a Title vs. Career match for the Impact Knockouts World Championship		
February 24	No Surrender	Sam's Town Live	Sunrise Manor, Nevada	—	Josh Alexander (c) vs. Rich Swann for the Impact World Championship		
March 24	Sacrifice	St. Clair College Sportsplex	Windsor, Ontario, Canada	—	Frankie Kazarian, Rich Swann and Steve Maclin vs. Time Machine (Kushida, Alex Shelley, and Chris Sabin)		
March 30	Multiverse United	Globe Theater	Los Angeles, California	—	Hiroshi Tanahashi vs. Mike Bailey	Co-produced with New Japan Pro-Wrestling Held as part of WrestleCon	
April 16	Rebellion	The Rebel Complex	Toronto, Ontario, Canada	—	Jordynne Grace vs. Deonna Purrazzo for the vacant Impact Knockouts World Championship		
May 26	Under Siege	Western Fair District Agriplex	London, Ontario, Canada	—	Steve Maclin (c) vs. PCO in a No Disqualification match for the Impact World Championship		
June 9	Against All Odds	Ohio Expo Center	Columbus, Ohio	—	Steve Maclin (c) vs Alex Shelley for the Impact World Championship		
June 30	Down Under Tour	Equex Centre	Wagga Wagga, New South Wales, Australia	—	Alex Shelley (c) vs. Steve Maclin for the Impact World Championship	Co-produced with Oceania Pro Wrestling	
July 1	Down Under Tour	Equex Centre	Wagga Wagga, New South Wales, Australia	—	Deonna Purrazzo (c) vs. Gisele Shaw for the Impact Knockouts World Championship	Co-produced with Oceania Pro Wrestling	
July 15	Slammiversary	St. Clair College Sportsplex	Windsor, Ontario, Canada	—	Alex Shelley (c) vs. Nick Aldis for the Impact World Championship		
August 20	Multiverse United 2	2300 Arena	Philadelphia, Pennsylvania	665	Alex Shelley (c) vs. Hiroshi Tanahashi for the Impact World Championship	Co-produced with New Japan Pro-Wrestling	
August 27	Emergence	Rebel Entertainment Complex	Toronto, Ontario, Canada	—	Trinity (c) vs. Deonna Purrazzo for the Impact Knockouts World Championship		
September 8	Victory Road	Westchester County Center	White Plains, New York	—	Josh Alexander vs. Steve Maclin		
October 21	Bound for Glory	Cicero Stadium	Cicero, Illinois	1,000	Alex Shelley (c) vs. Josh Alexander for the Impact World Championship		
October 27 (aired November 3)	Turning Point	Walker Activity Dome	Newcastle upon Tyne, England	—	Will Ospreay vs. Eddie Edwards		
December 9	Final Resolution	Don Kolov Arena	Mississauga, Ontario, Canada	—	Josh Alexander and Zack Sabre Jr. vs. Motor City Machine Guns (Alex Shelley and Chris Sabin)		
(c) – refers to the champion(s) heading into the match

=== Total Nonstop Action Wrestling events ===
==== 2024 ====
TNA+ exclusive event

Date	Event	Venue	Location	ATN	Main event	Notes	Ref.
January 13	Hard To Kill	Palms Casino Resort	Paradise, Nevada	—	Alex Shelley (c) vs. Moose for the TNA World Championship		
February 23	No Surrender	Alario Center	Westwego, Louisiana	750	Chris Sabin (c) vs. Mustafa Ali for the TNA X Division Championship		
March 8	Sacrifice	St. Clair College Sportsplex	Windsor, Ontario, Canada	—	Moose (c) vs. Eric Young for the TNA World Championship		
April 20	Rebellion	Palms Casino Resort	Paradise, Nevada	1,150	Moose (c) vs. Nic Nemeth for the TNA World Championship		
May 3	Under Siege	Washington Avenue Armory	Albany, New York	—	The System (Moose, Brian Myers, and Eddie Edwards) vs. "Broken" Matt Hardy and Speedball Mountain (Trent Seven and Mike Bailey)		
June 14	Against All Odds	Cicero Stadium	Cicero, Illinois	—	Moose (c) vs. "Broken" Matt Hardy in a Broken Rules match for the TNA World Championship		
July 20	Slammiversary	Verdun Auditorium	Montreal, Quebec, Canada	4,100	Moose (c) vs. Nic Nemeth vs. Josh Alexander vs. Steve Maclin vs. Frankie Kazarian vs. Joe Hendry in a six-way elimination match for the TNA World Championship		
August 30	Emergence	Old Forester's Paristown Hall	Louisville, Kentucky	—	Nic Nemeth (c) vs. Josh Alexander in a 60-minute Iron Man match for the TNA World Championship		
September 13	Victory Road	Boeing Center at Tech Port	San Antonio, Texas	2,000	Nic Nemeth (c) vs. Moose for the TNA World Championship		
October 26	Bound for Glory	Wayne State Fieldhouse	Detroit, Michigan	3,000	The System (Brian Myers and Eddie Edwards) (c) vs. The Hardys (Matt Hardy and Jeff Hardy) vs. ABC (Ace Austin and Chris Bey) in a Three-way Full Metal Mayhem match for the TNA World Tag Team Championship		
November 29	Turning Point	Benton Convention Center	Winston-Salem, North Carolina	—	Nic Nemeth (c) vs. Eddie Edwards for the TNA World Championship	Held as part of WrestleCade	
December 13	Final Resolution	Center Stage Theater	Atlanta, Georgia	—	Nic Nemeth (c) vs. A. J. Francis for the TNA World Championship		
(c) – refers to the champion(s) heading into the match

==== 2025 ====
TNA+ exclusive event

Date	Event	Venue	Location	ATN	Main event	Notes	Ref.
January 19	Genesis	Curtis Culwell Center	Garland, Texas	4,032	Nic Nemeth (c) vs. Joe Hendry for the TNA World Championship		
March 14	Sacrifice	El Paso County Coliseum	El Paso, Texas	3,500	The System (Eddie Edwards, Brian Myers, and JDC) and The Colons (Eddie Colon and Orlando Jordan) vs. Matt Hardy, Nic Nemeth, Leon Slater, Elijah, and Joe Hendry in a 10-man Steel Cage tag team match		
April 17	Unbreakable	Cox Pavilion	Las Vegas, Nevada	—	Steve Maclin vs. AJ Francis vs. Eric Young in a three-way match for the TNA International Championship		
April 27	Rebellion	Galen Center	Los Angeles, California	—	Joe Hendry (c) vs. Frankie Kazarian vs. Ethan Page in a three-way match for the TNA World Championship		
May 23	Under Siege	CAA Centre	Brampton, Ontario, Canada	—	Elijah and Joe Hendry vs. Frankie Kazarian and Trick Williams		
May 25	Border Brawl	Niagara Falls Convention Centre	Niagara Falls, Ontario, Canada	—	Santino Marella, Tommy Dreamer, Cody Deaner, Matt Hardy, and Jody Threat vs. The System (Moose, Eddie Edwards, Brian Myers, JDC, and Alisha Edwards)	Zone·ify exclusive event	
June 6	Against All Odds	Mullett Arena	Tempe, Arizona	—	Trick Williams (c) vs. Elijah for the TNA World Championship		
July 20	Slammiversary	UBS Arena	Elmont, New York	7,623	Trick Williams (c) vs. Joe Hendry vs. Mike Santana in a three-way match for the TNA World Championship		
August 15	Emergence	Chesapeake Employers Insurance Arena	Baltimore, Maryland	—	Trick Williams (c) vs. Moose for the TNA World Championship		
September 26	Victory Road	Edmonton Expo Centre	Edmonton, Alberta, Canada	—	Leon Slater (c) vs Myron Reed for the TNA X Division Championship		
October 12	Bound for Glory	Tsongas Center	Lowell, Massachusetts	6,137	Trick Williams (c) vs. Mike Santana for the TNA World Championship		
November 14	Turning Point	Full Sail University	Winter Park, Florida	626	Frankie Kazarian and Nic Nemeth vs. Steve Maclin and Mike Santana		
December 5	Final Resolution	El Paso County Coliseum	El Paso, Texas	2,567	Frankie Kazarian (c) vs. JDC for the TNA World Championship		
(c) – refers to the champion(s) heading into the match

==== 2026 ====
Date	Event	Venue	Location	ATN	Main event	Ref.
January 17	Genesis	Curtis Culwell Center	Garland, Texas	3,946	Mike Santana (c) vs. Frankie Kazarian in a Texas Deathmatch for the TNA World Championship; Nic Nemeth was the special guest referee.	
February 13	No Surrender	The Pinnacle	Nashville, Tennessee	—	Mike Santana and Leon Slater vs. Nic Nemeth and Eddie Edwards	
March 27	Sacrifice	Alario Center	Westwego, Louisiana	1,341	Mike Santana (c) vs. Steve Maclin for the TNA World Championship	
April 11	Rebellion	Wolstein Center	Cleveland, Ohio	3,929	Mike Santana (c) vs. Eddie Edwards for the TNA World Championship	
June 28	Slammiversary	Agganis Arena	Boston, Massachusetts	2,983	Mike Santana (c) vs. Nic Nemeth for the TNA World Championship	
August 23	Lockdown	Credit Union 1 Arena	Chicago, Illinois	6,504	The Hardys (Matt Hardy and Jeff Hardy) (c) vs. The Nemeths (Nic Nemeth and Ryan Nemeth) in a Steel Cage Tornado tag team match for the TNA World Tag Team Championship	
October 11	Bound for Glory	Yuengling Center	Tampa, Florida	2,419	Nic Nemeth (c) vs. Leon Slater for the TNA World Championship	
November 15	Destination X	Edmonton Expo Centre	Edmonton, Alberta, Canada	2,089	Leon Slater (c) vs. Trey Miguel for the TNA World Championship	
(c) – refers to the champion(s) heading into the match

== Upcoming events ==
=== 2027 ===
Date	Event	Venue	Location	ATN	Main event	Notes	Ref.
(c) – refers to the champion(s) heading into the match

== Number of events by year ==
Overall total – 414

Number of TNA pay-per-view and livestreaming events
