= List of Global Force Wrestling events and specials =

This is a list of Global Force Wrestling events and specials, detailing all professional wrestling cards promoted, co-promoted or produced by Global Force Wrestling.

== Pay-per-view specials ==
Event	Date (taped)	Date (aired)	City	Venue
GFW Amped Anthology	July 24, 2015	August 11, 2017	Paradise, Nevada	Orleans Arena
GFW Amped Anthology	August 21, 2015	September 15, 2017	Paradise, Nevada	Orleans Arena
GFW Amped Anthology	August 21, 2015	October 13, 2017	Paradise, Nevada	Orleans Arena
GFW Amped Anthology	October 23, 2015	December 8, 2017	Paradise, Nevada	Orleans Arena

== Live events ==
=== 2015 ===
Date	Event	Venue	Location	Main event
June 12	GFW Grand Slam Tour	The Ballpark at Jackson	Jackson, Tennessee	Bullet Club (Doc Gallows and Karl Anderson) vs. The New Heavenly Bodies (Dustin Corino and Justin Corino)
June 13	GFW Grand Slam Tour	Smokies Park	Knoxville, Tennessee	Bullet Club (Doc Gallows and Karl Anderson) vs. The New Heavenly Bodies (Dustin Corino and Justin Corino)
June 20	GFW Grand Slam Tour	Trustmark Park	Jackson, Mississippi	Chris Mordetzky vs. Shelton Benjamin
June 21	GFW Grand Slam Tour	Bowling Green Ballpark	Bowling Green, Kentucky	The Young Bucks (Matt Jackson and Nick Jackson) vs. Andrew Everett and PJ Black
July 9	GFW Grand Slam Tour	Fox Cities Stadium	Appleton, Wisconsin	Bullet Club (Doc Gallows and Karl Anderson) vs. OI4K (Dave Crist and Jake Crist)
July 10	GFW Grand Slam Tour	Jerry Uht Park	Erie, Pennsylvania	Bullet Club (Doc Gallows and Karl Anderson) vs. PJ Black and Seiya Sanada
July 11	GFW Grand Slam Tour	Classic Park	Lake County, Ohio	Eric Young vs. Johnny Gargano
August 14	GFW Grand Slam Tour	BB&T Ballpark	Winston-Salem, North Carolina	Nick Aldis vs. Lance Hoyt
August 22	GFW Grand Slam Tour	Aces Ballpark	Reno, Nevada	Reno Scum (Adam Thornstowe and Luster The Legend) vs. Bullet Club (Doc Gallows and Karl Anderson)
August 28	GFW Grand Slam Tour	Metro Bank Park	Harrisburg, Pennsylvania	Doc Gallows vs. Ali Akbar and Seiya Sanada
August 29	GFW Grand Slam Tour	Diamond Ballpark	Richmond, Virginia	Doc Gallows vs. Ali Akbar and Seiya Sanada
September 3	GFW Grand Slam Tour	Veterans Memorial Stadium	Cedar Rapids, Iowa	Nick Aldis vs. Chris Mordetzky
September 4	GFW Grand Slam Tour	Riverfront Stadium	Waterloo, Iowa	Nick Aldis vs. Chris Mordetzky
September 5	GFW Grand Slam Tour	Ashford University Field	Clinton, Iowa	Colt Cabana vs. Ariya Daivari
October 28	GFW UK Invasion	Grimsby Auditorium	Grimsby, England	The British Invasion (Doug Williams and Nick Aldis) vs. Marty Scurll and Rampage Brown
October 30	GFW UK Invasion	The Lynnsport & Leisure Park	King's Lynn, England	Nick Aldis vs. Marty Scurll
(c) – refers to the champion(s) heading into the match

=== 2016 ===
Date	Event	Venue	Location	Main event
January 22	GFW Amped Live	Mid-Hudson Civic Center	Poughkeepsie, New York	Andrew Everett, Brian Myers and Nick Aldis vs. Kevin Matthews, Pat Buck and Amazing Red
March 2	GFW Amped Live	Exeter Corn Exchange	Exeter, England	Nick Aldis (c) vs. Joel Redman for the GFW Global Championship
March 3	GFW Amped Live	Epic Dalston	London, England	Nick Aldis (c) vs. John Klinger for the GFW Global Championship
March 4	GFW Amped Live	Sports Connexion	Coventry, England	Nick Aldis (c) vs. Cyanide for the GFW Global Championship
July 1	Global Force Wrestling Live	Rent One Park	Marion, Illinois	Cody Deaner, Colt Cabana and Swoggle vs. Connor Braxton, Jake Dirden and Joe Coleman
(c) – refers to the champion(s) heading into the match

== Co-promoted events ==
=== 2016 ===
Date	Event	Venue	Location	Main event
January 30	Pro Wrestling Syndicate vs. Global Force Wrestling	Rahway Rec Center	Rahway, New Jersey	Team PWS vs. Team GFW
February 19	GFW vs. GWX – Military Mayhem	Indian Head Naval Base	Indian Head, Maryland	Gunner vs. Cory Bush (c) for the GWX Heavyweight Championship
March 5	PCW vs. GFW – Global Conflict	Club Domain	Blackpool, England	Sha Samuels (c) vs. Dave Mastiff for the PCW Heavyweight Championship
April 8	TNT vs. GFW – Show of Force	Wilma Rudolph Event Center	Clarksville, Tennessee	Nick Aldis (c) vs. Bram for the GFW Global Championship
May 13	MCW vs. GFW – Collision Course	MCW Arena	Joppa, Maryland	Jeff Jarrett and The Punk Rock All Stars (Drake Carter & Shaun Cannon) vs. Ken Dixon and The Ecktourage (Dirty Money & Eric Chapel)
May 14	Nova Pro Wrestling vs. Global Force Wrestling	Spotswood High School	Penn Laird, Virginia	Nick Aldis (c) vs. Brandon Scott for the GFW Global Championship
May 15	AML vs. GFW – Confrontation 2016	Hickory Metro Convention Center	Hickory, North Carolina	Jeff Jarrett (c) vs. Matt Hardy vs. Ethan Carter III in a Three-way Steel Cage Match for the WrestleCade Championship
June 11	WrestlePro vs. Global Force Wrestling	St. Joseph R.C. Church	Keyport, New Jersey	Pat Buck vs. Jeff Jarrett in a Steel Cage Match
October 1	GFW vs. MXPW – Northern Justice	École Secondaire Catholique Thériault	Timmins, Ontario, Canada	Chris Mordetzky vs. Kongo Kong
October 2	DWW vs. GFW – Global Showdown	Don Kolov Arena	Mississauga, Ontario, Canada	Jeff Jarrett vs. Kongo Kong
November 19	TNT vs. GFW – Road To The Gold	Wilma Rudolph Event Center	Clarksville, Tennessee	Jeff Jarrett vs. Jeremiah Plunkett and Tony Kozina
(c) – refers to the champion(s) heading into the match

=== 2017 ===
Date	Event	Venue	Location	Main event
March 18	TNT vs. GFW – The Art of War II	Wilma Rudolph Event Center	Clarksville, Tennessee	Jeff Hardy vs. Bram
(c) – refers to the champion(s) heading into the match

== Produced events ==
=== Professional wrestling shows ===
Date	Event	Venue	Location	Main event
January 4, 2015	Wrestle Kingdom 9	Tokyo Dome	Tokyo, Japan	Hiroshi Tanahashi (c) vs. Kazuchika Okada for the IWGP Heavyweight Championship
October 21, 2018	NWA 70th Anniversary Show	Tennessee State Fairground Sports Arena	Nashville, Tennessee	Cody (c) vs. Nick Aldis for the NWA World Heavyweight Championship
(c) – refers to the champion(s) heading into the match

=== Conventions and events ===
Date	Event	Venue	Location
July 25, 2018	Jeff Jarrett – Ain't He Great	Sheffield Library Theatre	Sheffield, England
August 28 – September 2, 2018	Starrcast 2018	Hyatt Regency Chicago	Schaumburg, Illinois
(c) – refers to the champion(s) heading into the match

== See also ==
- List of All Elite Wrestling pay-per-view events
- List of major Lucha Libre AAA Worldwide events
- List of ECW supercards and pay-per-view events
- List of FMW supercards and pay-per-view events
- List of Impact Wrestling pay-per-view events
- List of Major League Wrestling events
- List of National Wrestling Alliance pay-per-view events
- List of NJPW pay-per-view events
- List of NWA/WCW closed-circuit events and pay-per-view events
- List of Ring of Honor pay-per-view events
- List of Smokey Mountain Wrestling supercard events
- List of WCW Clash of the Champions shows
- List of WWA pay-per-view events
- List of World Class Championship Wrestling Supercard events
- List of WWE pay-per-view and WWE Network events
- List of WWE Saturday Night Main Event shows
- List of WWE Tribute to the Troops shows
