= Ray Tanguay =

Former chair and president of Toyota Motor Manufacturing Canada Inc

Real (Ray) C. Tanguay is the former chair and president of Toyota Motor Manufacturing Canada Inc. (TMMC). Tanguay retired from Toyota in March 2015 and currently serves as Auto Advisor to the federal and Ontario governments and the Vice-Chair of the Board of Directors for the Trillium Network for Advanced Manufacturing. He currently lives in Kitchener, Ontario. He was named to the Order of Canada in 2017.

== Education ==
Born and raised on a dairy farm in Northern Ontario, Tanguay earned his degree in Electrical Engineering Technology from St. Clair College in 1972 and graduated from Wilfrid Laurier University in business management in 1983.

== Career ==
Tanguay spent the first 19 years of his career working in the electronics industry. He was employed as the manager of Electrohome Ltd in Kitchener, Ontario from 1972 to 1982. Tanguay joined Philips Electronics Limited in 1983, as a Director of Electronics Displays and Consumer Service and was promoted to Vice President of Eastern Region in 1989.

In 1991, Tanguay joined TMMC, and was quickly recognized as a leading force in instilling innovation within the company. during the next 24 years, TMMC has been recognized with 14 J.D. Power and Associates plant quality awards, including the global best Platinum Award in 2011 and 2014. Under his stewardship, TMMC became the first Toyota manufacturing plant outside of Japan to produce Lexus vehicles, beginning in 2003. In 2005 Toyota announced the investment of $1.2 billion to build the Woodstock factory for the RAV4. In 2005, Tanguay was promoted as Managing Officer of Toyota Motor Corporation (TMC) in Japan and took additional responsibilities as Executive Vice President of Toyota Engineering Manufacturing North America and Chief Risk Officer. In 2011 Tanguay was promoted to the position of Senior Managing Officer and was instrumental in developing the Global Vision for the company.

In addition to his role as Automotive Advisor, Tanguay is a founding member of the Canadian Automotive Partnership Council, founding member of OG100, Executive Advisor to FIRST, Dean Advisory Council for both University of Waterloo and Wilfrid Laurier University.

== Honours and awards ==
In 2012, Tanguay received an honorary Doctorate of Law (JD) from Wilfrid Laurier University and an honorary Doctorate of Engineering from the University of Waterloo. He was named a member of the Order of Canada in 2017.
