= Impact Wrestling vs. Lucha Underground =

2018 Impact Wrestling and Lucha Underground event

- Promotional poster
- Promotion(s): Impact Wrestling; Lucha Underground
- Date: April 6, 2018
- City: New Orleans, Louisiana
- Venue: Sugar Mill

Impact Wrestling Twitch special chronology
← Previous; Last Chancery	Next → Penta Does Iowa

Impact Wrestling vs. Lucha Underground was a professional wrestling livestreaming event co-produced by Impact Wrestling and Lucha Underground. The event took place on April 6, 2018 at the Sugar Mill in New Orleans, Louisiana and was streamed live on Impact Wrestling's Twitch channel in conjunction with WrestleCon during WrestleMania 34 weekend.

== Production ==
=== Background ===
Lucha Underground was founded in 2014 after the El Rey Network announced that they would be launching a one-hour weekly television series with Lucha Libre AAA Worldwide. The promotion was a joint venture between Mark Burnett, a British-American television producer known for creating series such as The Apprentice, Are You Smarter than a 5th Grader?, Shark Tank, and The Voice, and the El Rey Network. The promotion often featured wrestlers from the AAA promotion in addition to wrestlers signed to Lucha Underground or have wrestled in the independent circuit.

On March 1, 2018, Impact Wrestling announced that they would be holding a joint show with Lucha Underground at the Sugar Mill in New Orleans, Louisiana. In addition to the announcement, Impact announced a working relationship with Lucha Underground. On March 21, 2018, Impact Wrestling announced the main event match which would be between Austin Aries and Fenix and Alberto El Patron and Pentagon Jr.

=== Storylines ===
Impact Wrestling vs. Lucha Underground featured professional wrestling matches that involves different wrestlers from pre-existing scripted feuds and storylines. Wrestlers portrayed villains, heroes, or less distinguishable characters in scripted events that built tension and culminated in a wrestling match or series of matches. Storylines were produced on Impact Wrestling's weekly shows Impact and Xplosion and on Lucha Underground's eponymous television show.

== Results ==
No.	Results	Stipulations	Times
1	Matanza Cueto defeated Caleb Konley, Chavo Guerrero Jr., Jack Evans, Matt Sydal and Moose	Six-way match	6:40
2	Allie (c) defeated Taya Valkyrie	Singles match for the Impact Knockouts Championship	9:14
3	Scott Steiner and Teddy Hart defeated oVe (Dave Crist and Jake Crist)	Tag team match	7:44
4	Aero Star, Drago and King Cuerno defeated Andrew Everett, Dezmond Xavier and DJ Z	Six Man Tag Team Match	10:14
5	Trevor Lee defeated Marty Martinez (with Famous B)	Singles match	5:10
6	Latin American Exchange (Santana and Ortiz) (c) defeated Killshot and The Mack	Tag Team match for the Impact World Tag Team Championship	13:14
7	Brian Cage defeated Eli Drake	Singles match	7:12
8	Jeremiah Crane defeated Eddie Edwards	I Quit Match	20:14
9	Pentagón Dark defeated Austin Aries and Fénix	Three-way match	10:24
(c) / – the champion(s) heading into the match
