= St. Clair College =

College in Essex and Chatham-Kent, Ontario, Canada

Coordinates: 42°14′48.02″N 83°01′07.26″W

St. Clair College of Applied Arts and Technology
- Motto: Start Here. Go Anywhere.
- Type: Public college of applied arts and technology
- Established: 1966; 60 years ago
- Affiliations: CICan, Colleges Ontario, Canadian Bureau for International Education
- Chair: Garry Rossi
- President: Michael Silvaggi
- Faculty: c. 264
- Students: 2025: 6,956 FTEs
- Location: 2000 Talbot Road West (main campus), Windsor, Ontario, Canada
- Campus: Suburban
- Colours: Black, gold, green
- Nickname: Saints
- Sporting affiliations: CCAA, OCAA, CFJL
- Mascot: Griff the Griffin
- Website: www.stclaircollege.ca

St. Clair College of Applied Arts and Technology is a college in the Southwestern Ontario counties of Essex and Chatham-Kent, partnered with private Ace Acumen Academy in Toronto.

== Campus ==
Its main administration and largest campus sites are in Windsor, Ontario, Canada. In addition, other campuses are located in Chatham and formerly in Wallaceburg. In 2007, St. Clair College expanded to downtown Windsor by purchasing the former City of Windsor owned Cleary International Centre, renaming it St. Clair College Centre for the Arts. In 2009, St. Clair College bought the former City of Windsor owned Salvation Army building in downtown Windsor for $1. With a $5 million grant from the federal government, the building was turned into a state of the art journalism school; the first of its kind in Canada. In 2014, St. Clair College built a new sports complex at the main campus, called the SportsPlex.

== History ==
The college has its roots in the Western Ontario Institute of Technology, founded in 1958 to supplement the then-Ryerson Institute in Toronto, now Toronto Metropolitan University. With the advent of the Colleges of Applied Arts and Technology, St. Clair was founded in 1966; the two institutions were merged a year later. Growth of the college has generally paralleled that of Windsor. Colleges of Applied Arts and Technology were established on May 21, 1965. It is an Ontario College of Applied Arts and Technology. The school was founded in 1966 as part of a provincial initiative to create many such institutions to provide career-oriented diploma and certificate courses, as well as continuing education programs to Ontario communities.

In 2018 annual college revenue sat at roughly $150 million. By 2021-22 St. Clair College's student headcount of international students exceeded domestic students. The unprecedented growth in international student enrolment has not been met with a corresponding increase in student housing at St. Clair College. By 2024 annual college revenue was over $300 million with more than $200 million coming from foreign student tuition. Student-led protest claimed the college was issuing failing grades to increase tuition.

== Campuses ==
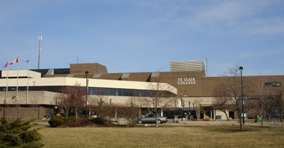
Windsor (South) Campus - Main Building

Windsor, Ontario

- The Windsor (South) Campus is the main campus, 2000 Talbot Road West
  - Ford Centre for Excellence in Manufacturing (FCEM)
  - Anthony P. Toldo Centre for Applied Health Sciences
  - SportsPlex Fitness Centre
- The St. Clair Centre for the Arts is located on the riverfront in downtown Windsor, 201 Riverside Drive West
- MediaPlex is located in downtown Windsor, 275 Victoria Avenue

Chatham-Kent, Ontario

- The Thames Campus is located on 1001 Grand Avenue West, Chatham
  - HealthPlex

Toronto, Ontario

- The St Clair College, Ace Acumen Academy campus is located at 1440 Don Mills Rd, North York

== Student government & athletics ==
The college has of student regulated governments that handle much of the student related activities at the college. They are the Student Representative Council (SRC), the Student Athletic Association (SAA), and the Thames Students Inc. (TSI).

The college's athletic teams are the called Saints and the school fields seven men's teams and seven women's teams in the Canadian Collegiate Athletic Association and Ontario Colleges Athletic Association. Additionally, since 2020, St. Clair's SAA has owned the St. Clair Saints football team, which plays in the Canadian Junior Football League (CJFL), as an eighth men's sport.

== Scholarships and bursaries ==
St. Clair College scholarships for Indigenous, First Nations and Métis students include: Métis Nation of Ontario, St. Clair College Bursary.

== 2017 strike ==
On Monday, October 16, 2017, the team bargaining on behalf of the province's 24 Colleges and the OPSEU union representing 12,000 full-time faculty, partial load faculty, counsellors and librarians, could not reach an agreement, and all faculty entered a work stoppage. On November 21, the strike was lifted and classes were resumed, however, many initial issues were not resolved.

== See also ==
- Canadian government scientific research organizations
- Canadian industrial research and development organizations
- Canadian Interuniversity Sport
- Canadian university scientific research organizations
- Higher education in Ontario
- List of colleges and universities named after people
- List of colleges in Ontario
