= One Night Only: GFW Amped Anthology =

- Promotion(s): Impact Wrestling; Global Force Wrestling
- Date: Part 1: July 24, 2015; Part 2 and 3: August 21, 2015; Part 4: October 23, 2015 (aired Part 1: August 11, 2017; Part 2: September 15, 2017; Part 3: October 13, 2017; Part 4: December 8, 2017)
- City: Paradise, Nevada
- Venue: Orleans Arena
- Attendance: 3,000

One Night Only chronology
← Previous; No Surrender	Next → Collision in Oklahoma

One Night Only: GFW Amped Anthology was a professional wrestling pay-per-view event produced by Global Force Wrestling (GFW) and Impact Wrestling. The event aired on August 11, 2017, September 15, 2017, October 13, 2017, and December 8, 2017 in four parts. The event consisted of matches which were taped for GFW's weekly television show Amped at the Orleans Arena in Paradise, Nevada.

== Production ==
=== Background ===
With Jeff Jarrett's departure as minority investor of Total Nonstop Action Wrestling (TNA), he launched Global Force Wrestling (business name Global Force Entertainment, LLC) in April 2014 and began promoting the brand and establishing international partnerships with wrestling promotions across the world. The promotion had a strategic partnership with 25/7 Productions and David Broome (creator of NBC's The Biggest Loser). Broome stated that the promotion planned to create new on-air content 52 weeks per year.

By August 2014, GFW had established partnerships with Mexican promotion Lucha Libre AAA World Wide (AAA), Japan's New Japan Pro-Wrestling (NJPW) promotion, multiple European promotions, South African promotion World Wrestling Professionals (WWP), and promotions from Australia and New Zealand. As part of GFW's relationship with New Japan Pro-Wrestling, it presented NJPW's Wrestle Kingdom 9 at the Tokyo Dome on the American pay-per-view market on January 4, 2015. The pay-per-view featured English language commentary from Jim Ross and Matt Striker. Wrestle Kingdom 9 reportedly drew 12,000 to 15,000 buys in North America.

Throughout May 2015, Jarrett announced talent for their roster, which included Bullet Club members Karl Anderson and Doc Gallows, the Killer Elite Squad, and Chael Sonnen as a color commentator. Jarrett also announced that four champions (Global, NEX*GEN, Tag Team and Women's Champion) would be crowned at the July 24 tapings.

On June 12, 2015, GFW held its first show at The Ballpark at Jackson in Jackson, Tennessee, as part of the Grand Slam Tour, which entailed holding events at minor league baseball stadiums. In that show's main event, Karl Anderson and Doc Gallows defeated the New Heavenly Bodies.

On July 9, 2015, Jeff Jarrett announced that the name of GFW's television program was "Amped". Tapings for Amped took place at the Orleans Arena in Las Vegas, Nevada on July 24, August 21, and October 23, 2015. In a December 2015 interview, Jeff Jarrett said that they had sixteen one-hour shows filmed at the Las Vegas tapings and hoped to have the programs air globally on television in the future.

=== Aftermath ===
Following Jarrett's return to TNA on January 5, 2017 as the promotion's chief creative officer, Jarrett stated that GFW and the newly renamed Impact Wrestling were "becoming one day-by-day". On the April 20 episode of Impact Wrestling, Karen Jarrett announced that GFW and Impact Wrestling had officially merged. In a press release issued on June 28, Impact Wrestling announced that their parent company, Anthem Sports & Entertainment Corp., had entered into an agreement to acquire GFW. After the announcement, Impact Wrestling rebranded and took on the GFW name. Jeff Jarrett took an indefinite leave of absence from the company in September and Anthem slowly reverted to using the Impact Wrestling name. Impact Wrestling's rebranding officially concluded on October 23, when Impact announced that they had severed ties with Jarrett and GFW. The deal for Anthem to acquire GFW was never completed and Jeff Jarrett continues to own the rights to GFW.

On August 14, 2018, Jeff Jarrett and Global Force Entertainment announced that they had filed a lawsuit against Anthem Sports & Entertainment in the District Court of Tennessee for copyright infringement over the GFW rights, as Jarrett owned all GFW properties since its founding in 2014. It was revealed on February 19, 2019, that Jarrett filed another lawsuit accusing Impact Wrestling of deleting the master copies of all 16 hours of GFW Amped. Jarrett also sued in attempt to get the trademarks of his name and likeness from Anthem. Anthem counter-sued in July 2019, arguing that they were the rightful owners of the "Jeff Jarrett" copyright, that Jarrett knew the master tapes had been deleted, that they made no money off of GFW's content and that the looks and trademarks of GFW and their former Global Wrestling Network app are not similar.

A mistrial was declared on July 30, 2020. The jury had come to a verdict but this was voided by a judge after a motion by Anthem stated that comments made by Jarrett's attorney had prejudiced them. Jarrett requested for a new trial but it was turned down without prejudice, meaning that he could have requested a new trial at a later date. However, Jarrett and Anthem reached a settlement in January 2021.

== Results ==
Part 1 - July 24, 2015 (aired August 11, 2017)
No.	Results	Stipulations	Times
1	PJ Black defeated Seiya Sanada	GFW NEX*GEN Championship Tournament match	08:50
2	Los Luchas (Phoenix Star and Zokre) and Misterioso Jr. defeated Bestia 666, Blood Eagle and Shamu Jr.	Six-man Lucha rules tag team match	06:30
3	KUSHIDA defeated Virgil Flynn via submission	Singles match	10:30
4	Bobby Roode defeated Kevin Kross via submission	Singles match	07:40
5	The Bollywood Boyz (Gurv Sihra and Harv Sihra) defeated The Akbars (Ali Akbar and Omar Akbar)	GFW Tag Team Championship Tournament match	08:55
6	Christina Von Eerie defeated Lei'D Tapa (with Royal Red) and Mickie James	GFW Women's Championship Tournament match	07:10
7	Jigsaw defeated Sonjay Dutt	GFW NEX*GEN Championship Tournament match	10:30
8	Nick Aldis defeated Kongo Kong (with Henry Maxwell)	GFW Global Championship Tournament match	09:40

Part 2 - August 21, 2015 (aired September 15, 2017)
No.	Results	Stipulations	Times
1	Reno Scum (Adam Thornstowe and Luster the Legend) defeated Los Luchas (Phoenix Star and Zokre)	GFW Tag Team Championship Tournament match	09:10
2	Chris Mordetzky defeated Brian Myers via submission	GFW Global Championship Tournament match	08:47
3	Teaze 'n' Sleaze (Juicy Joey and Kenny Klimax) defeated Cielo and Misterioso Jr.	GFW Tag Team Championship Tournament match	06:40
4	Shelton Benjamin defeated JR Kratos	GFW Global Championship Tournament match	05:58
5	T. J. Perkins defeated Andrew Everett via submission	GFW NEX*GEN Championship Tournament match	10:55
6	Bullet Club (Doc Gallows and Karl Anderson) (with Amber Gallows) defeated Killer Elite Squad (Lance Archer and Davey Boy Smith Jr.)	GFW Tag Team Championship Tournament match	09:25
7	PJ Black and The Akbars (Ali Akbar and Omar Akbar) defeated Sonjay Dutt and Los Luchas (Phoenix Star and Zokre)	Six-man tag team match	07:18
8	Bobby Roode defeated Eric Young	GFW Global Championship Tournament match	09:17

Part 3 - August 21, 2015 (aired October 13, 2017)
No.	Results	Stipulations	Times
1	Virgil Flynn defeated Trevor Lee	GFW NEX*GEN Championship Tournament Match	8:22
2	Amber Gallows defeated Katarina Leigh and Laura James	GFW Women's Championship Tournament Match	8:19
3	Kevin Kross defeated Juicy Joey (with Kenny Klimax)	Singles match	5:27
4	Nick Aldis defeated Chris Mordetzky	GFW Global Championship Tournament Match	11:15
5	PJ Black defeated Jigsaw, TJP and Virgil Flynn	GFW NEX*GEN Championship Tournament Finals 4-Way Match	11:54
6	Reno Scum (Adam Thornstowe and Luster the Legend) defeated Teaze 'n' Sleaze (Juicy Joey and Oozing Austin)	GFW Tag Team Championship Tournament Match	7:34
7	Kongo Kong (with Henry Maxwell) defeated Brian Myers and Kevin Kross	GFW Global Championship #1 Contenders Triple Threat Match	8:47

Part 3 - October 23, 2015 (aired December 8, 2017)
No.	Results	Stipulations	Times
1	Sonjay Dutt defeated Seiya Sanada	GFW NEX*GEN Championship #1 Contender's match	9:22
2	The Masked Saint defeated Juicy Joey	Singles match	5:11
3	The Bollywood Boyz (Gurv Sihra and Harv Sihra) defeated The Whirlwind Gentlemen (Jack Manley and Remy Marcel)	GFW Tag Team Championship Tournament match	9:50
4	Enigma defeated Bestia 666 and Cielo Escorpion	Three-way match	5:21
5	Christina Von Eerie defeated Amber Gallows	GFW Women's Championship Tournament Finals match	11:34
6	The Bollywood Boyz (Gurv Sihra and Harv Sihra) defeated Reno Scum (Adam Thornstowe and Luster the Legend) (with Christina Von Eerie)	GFW Tag Team Championship Tournament Finals match	11:48
7	Nick Aldis defeated Bobby Roode	GFW Global Championship Tournament Finals match	10:22
