= Impact One Night Only (2018) =

Impact Wrestling's One Night Only events during 2018

One Night Only is a series of professional wrestling events held by the American promotion Impact Wrestling in 2018. Beginning with the 2018 events, the series became exclusive to Global Wrestling Network, rather than be distributed on pay-per-view. All the 2018 events were co-promoted with independent promotions across North America.

== Collision in Oklahoma ==
Collision in Oklahoma
- Promotion(s): Impact Wrestling; Imperial Wrestling Revolution; Border City Wrestling
- Date: October 14, 2017; October 21, 2017 (aired January 10, 2018)
- City: Shawnee, Oklahoma; Windsor, Ontario, Canada
- Venue: Firelake Arena; St. Clair College Sportsplex
- Tagline: "When Worlds Collide"

One Night Only chronology
← Previous; GFW Amped Anthology – Part 4	Next → Canadian Clash

One Night Only: Collision in Oklahoma was a professional wrestling pay-per-view (PPV) event produced by Impact Wrestling, Imperial Wrestling Revolution and Border City Wrestling released exclusively on Global Wrestling Network. Some of the matches were taped in Shawnee, Oklahoma at IWR's second annual When Worlds Collide show, while others were taped in Windsor, Ontario at BCW's annual Excellence event.

No.	Results	Stipulations	Times
1	Malico defeated Trevor Lee, DJZ and Fuego Del Sol	Four-way match	06:03
2	Ohio Versus Everything (Dave Crist and Jake Crist) (c) defeated Phil Atlas and Brent Banks	Tag team match for the Impact World Tag Team Championship	07:40
3	Gail Kim defeated Rebel	Singles match	09:15
4	The Von Erichs (Marshall Von Erich and Ross Von Erich) (c) defeated The Arrow Club (Kid Kash and Ky-ote)	Tag team match for the IWR Tag Team Championships	10:10
5	Allie defeated K. C. Spinelli	Singles match	07:08
6	Allie and Rosemary defeated K. C. Spinelli and Sienna	Tag team match	06:22
7	The Latin American Xchange (Santana and Ortiz) defeated The Young Guns (Chandler Hopkins and Cody Dickson)	Tag team match	08:10
8	Hakim Zane and Mark Wheeler defeated Jon Bolen and John E. Bravo	Tag team match	08:00
9	Eli Drake (c) defeated Montigo Sika	Singles match for the Impact Global Championship	09:30
10	Alberto El Patrón defeated Lashley	No Disqualification match	18:05
(c) / – the champion(s) heading into the match

== Canadian Clash ==
Canadian Clash
- Promotion(s): Impact Wrestling; Border City Wrestling
- Date: October 14, 2017; November 7, 2017; December 3, 2017 (aired February 16, 2018)
- City: Ottawa, Ontario, Canada; Belleville, Michigan; Windsor, Ontario, Canada
- Venue: Aberdeen Pavilion; Diamondback Saloon; St. Clair College Sportsplex

One Night Only chronology
← Previous; Collision in Oklahoma	Next → March Breakdown

One Night Only: Canadian Clash was a professional wrestling pay-per-view (PPV) event produced by Impact Wrestling to be released exclusively on Global Wrestling Network. The event included matches taped during Border City Wrestling's annual Excellence event as well as BCW Motown Showdown.

No.	Results	Stipulations	Times
1	Dezmond Xavier and Eddie Edwards defeated Ohio Versus Everything (Dave Crist and Jake Crist)	Tag team match	10:38
2	Rosemary defeated K. C. Spinelli	Singles match	07:55
3	Petey Williams defeated Gavin Quinn, Hakim Zane and Jimmy Jacobs	Four-way X Division match	10:11
4	The Latin American Xchange (Santana and Ortiz) (with Homicide and Konnan) defeated The Cult of Lee (Trevor Lee and Caleb Konley)	Tag team match	07:50
5	Laurel Van Ness defeated Sienna	Singles match	08:48
6	Lashley defeated El Hijo del Fantasma	Singles match	09:12
7	Eli Drake (c) defeated A-1	Singles match for the Impact Global Championship	10:15
8	James Storm defeated Kurt Angle	Singles match (Final Resolution (2011) match)	17:48
9	Moose defeated Ethan Carter III	Singles match	09:10
10	Alberto El Patrón defeated James Storm	Singles match	13:02
(c) / – the champion(s) heading into the match

== March Breakdown ==
March Breakdown
- Promotion(s): Impact Wrestling; Border City Wrestling
- Date: March 3, 2018 (aired March 16, 2018)
- City: Windsor, Ontario, Canada
- Venue: St. Clair College Sportsplex

One Night Only chronology
← Previous; Canadian Clash	Next → Cali Combat

One Night Only: March Breakdown was a professional wrestling pay-per-view (PPV) event produced by Impact Wrestling in conjunction with Border City Wrestling to be released exclusively on Global Wrestling Network.

No.	Results	Stipulations	Times
1	El Reverso defeated Idris Abraham	Singles match	7:29
2	Madison Rayne defeated Gisele Shaw	Singles match	6:59
3	Desi Hit Squad (Gursinder Singh and Rohit Raju) defeated Sheldon Jean and Stone Rockwell	Tag team match	7:50
4	A-1 and Allie defeated Braxton Sutter and K. C. Spinelli	Mixed tag team match	8:11
5	Matt Sydal (c) defeated Petey Williams and Trevor Lee	Three-way match for the Impact X Division Championship	10:40
6	Eli Drake defeated Cody Deaner	Singles match	10:56
7	Jake Something and Phil Atlas (c) defeated Aiden Prince and Brent Banks	Tag team match for the BCW Can-Am Tag Team Championship	11:36
8	Joe Doering defeated Moose	Singles match	12:42
9	Kongo Kong (with Jimmy Jacobs) and RJ City defeated Austin Aries and Alberto El Patrón	Tag team match	14:05
(c) / – the champion(s) heading into the match

== Cali Combat ==
Cali Combat
- Promotion(s): Impact Wrestling; Big Time Wrestling
- Date: March 24, 2018 (aired May 11, 2018)
- City: Salinas, California
- Venue: Salinas PAL Armory
- Attendance: 900

One Night Only chronology
← Previous; March Breakdown	Next → Zero Fear

One Night Only: Cali Combat was a professional wrestling pay-per-view (PPV) event produced by Impact Wrestling in conjunction with Big Time Wrestling to be released exclusively on Global Wrestling Network.

No.	Results	Stipulations	Times
1	Luster the Legend defeated Scotty Wringer	Singles match	07:47
2	Trevor Lee defeated Kimo	Singles match	09:46
3	Scott Steiner and Teddy Hart defeated Ohio Versus Everything (Dave Crist and Jake Crist)	Tag team match (WrestleCon 2018 match)	07:25
4	Katarina Leigh defeated Taya Valkyrie	Singles match	08:48
5	James Ellsworth defeated Kal Jak	Singles match	06:08
6	The Latin American Xchange (Santana and Ortiz) (c) (with Diamante) defeated Killshot and Willie Mack	Tag team match for the Impact World Tag Team Championship (WrestleCon 2018 match)	13:15
7	The Latin American Xchange (Santana and Ortiz) (c) defeated The Ballard Brothers (Shane Ballard and Shannon Ballard) (with Missy Carlyle)	Tag team match for the Impact World Tag Team Championship	10:51
8	Allie (c) defeated Samara	Singles match for the Impact Knockouts Championship	07:32
9	Matt Sydal (c) defeated Eddie Edwards	Singles match for the Impact X Division Championship	09:28
10	King Cuerno, Drago and Aero Star defeated Andrew Everett, Dezmond Xavier and DJZ	Six-man Lucha Rules tag team match (WrestleCon 2018 match)	10:14
11	Austin Aries (c) defeated Eli Drake	Singles match for the Impact World Championship	12:01
(c) / – the champion(s) heading into the match

== Zero Fear ==
Zero Fear
- Promotion(s): Impact Wrestling; Destiny World Wrestling
- Date: June 3, 2018 (aired June 15, 2018)
- City: Mississauga, Ontario, Canada
- Venue: Don Kolov Arena
- Attendance: 300-500

One Night Only chronology
← Previous; Cali Combat	Next → Bad Intentions

One Night Only: Zero Fear was a professional wrestling pay-per-view (PPV) event produced by Impact Wrestling in conjunction with Destiny World Wrestling to be released exclusively on Global Wrestling Network.

No.	Results	Stipulations	Times
1	Matt Sydal defeated Dezmond Xavier	Singles match	09:18
2	Ace Austin defeated Mr. Atlantis	Singles match	03:52
3	Desi Hit Squad (Gursinder Singh and Rohit Raju) (w/Gama Singh) defeated Aiden Prince and Dustin Quicksilver	Tag team match	10:35
4	Madison Rayne defeated K. C. Spinelli	Singles match	08:14
5	Fallah Bahh and Stone Rockwell defeated The Fraternity (Channing Decker and Trent Gibson)	Tag team match	10:17
6	Eddie Edwards defeated Trevor Lee	Singles match	10:53
7	Su Yung (c) defeated Katarina	Singles match for the Impact Knockouts Championship	06:45
8	Sami Callihan defeated Josh Alexander	Singles match	11:52
9	Austin Aries (c) defeated Rich Swann	Singles match for the Impact World Championship	12:40
10	Pentagón Jr. defeated Eli Drake and Moose	Triple Threat match	14:12
(c) / – the champion(s) heading into the match

== Bad Intentions ==
Bad Intentions
- Promotion(s): Impact Wrestling; Destiny World Wrestling
- Date: August 25, 2018 (aired August 31, 2018)
- City: Mississauga, Ontario, Canada
- Venue: Don Kolov Arena
- Attendance: 400-600

One Night Only chronology
← Previous; Zero Fear	Next → Night of the Dummies

One Night Only: Bad Intentions was a professional wrestling pay-per-view (PPV) event produced by Impact Wrestling in conjunction with Destiny World Wrestling to be released exclusively on Global Wrestling Network.

No.	Results	Stipulations	Times
1	Ohio Versus Everything (Dave Crist & Jake Crist) defeated Desi Hit Squad (Gursinder Singh & Rohit Raju)	Tag team match	10:33
2	Channing Decker defeated Clayton Gainz	Singles match	09:00
3	Phil Atlas (w/Pasquale di Papa) defeated Greg Osbourne	Singles match	08:51
4	Kiera Hogan defeated K. C. Spinelli	Singles match	08:35
5	Aiden Prince defeated Ace Austin and Dustin Quicksilver	Triple Threat match	12:27
6	Stone Rockwell defeated Holden Albright	Singles match	09:00
7	Tessa Blanchard (c) defeated Gisele Shaw	Singles match for the Impact Knockouts Championship	09:47
8	Michael Elgin defeated Petey Williams	Singles match	16:25
9	Josh Alexander defeated Sami Callihan	Steel Cage match to determine the #1 Contender to the Destiny World Wrestling Championship	15:10
(c) / – the champion(s) heading into the match

== Night of the Dummies ==
Night of the Dummies
- Promotion(s): Impact Wrestling; Xcite Wrestling
- Date: August 25, 2018 (aired September 14, 2018)
- City: Binghamton, New York
- Venue: American Legion Post 80
- Attendance: 400-600

One Night Only chronology
← Previous; Bad Intentions	Next → BCW 25th Anniversary

One Night Only: Night of the Dummies was a professional wrestling pay-per-view (PPV) event produced by Impact Wrestling in conjunction with Xcite Wrestling to be released exclusively on Global Wrestling Network.

No.	Results	Stipulations	Times
1	Jay Freddie defeated Isys Ephex	Singles match	08:47
2	Fallah Bahh defeated Dick Justice	Singles match	08:13
3	Slyck Wagner Brown defeated Axel Lennox	Singles match	08:45
4	Alisha defeated Rebel	Singles match	07:32
5	Team Tremendous (Bill Carr & Dan Barry) defeated The Heavenly Bodies (Desirable Dustin & Gigolo Justin)	Tag team match	10:28
6	Santana defeated Homicide	Street Fight	05:58
7	Sean Carr defeated Brute VanSlyke (w/Father Derek)	Singles match	10:51
8	Moose defeated KM	Singles match	14:26
9	Eddie Edwards defeated Eli Drake	Singles match	24:32

== BCW 25th Anniversary ==
BCW 25th Anniversary
- Promotion(s): Impact Wrestling; Border City Wrestling
- Date: October 6, 2018 (aired November 16, 2018)
- City: Windsor, Ontario, Canada
- Venue: St. Clair College Sportsplex
- Attendance: 900-1,000

One Night Only chronology
← Previous; Night of the Dummies	Next → Back to Cali

One Night Only: BCW 25th Anniversary was a professional wrestling pay-per-view (PPV) event produced by Impact Wrestling in conjunction with Border City Wrestling to be released exclusively on Global Wrestling Network.

No.	Results	Stipulations	Times
1	Scarlett Bordeaux & Stone Rockwell defeated Eli Drake & K. C. Spinelli	Mixed tag team match	05:06
2	Matrox defeated Brad Martin, CK3, Fabio Morocco, Kurt Hendrik, Mr. Atlantis, N8 Mattson, Quicksilver, Rico Montana, Sheldon Jean, Trey Miguel, and Zachary Wentz	12-man Gauntlet Battle Royal	12:51
3	Kiera Hogan defeated Gisele Shaw	Singles match	07:48
4	Arquette City (David Arquette & RJ City) defeated Halal Beefcake (Idris Abraham & Joe Coleman)	Tag team match	08:28
5	D'Lo Brown, Highlander Robbie, & Tommy Dreamer defeated The Syndicate (Johnny Swinger, Jon Bolen, & Scott D'Amore) (w/Handsome Johnny Bradford)	Six-man tag team match	13:42
6	Aiden Prince & Brent Banks defeated Jake Something & Phil Atlas (c)	Tag team Ladder Match for the BCW Can-Am Tag Team Championship	16:46
7	Moose defeated Eddie Edwards	Street Fight	13:58
8	Cody Deaner defeated Johnny Impact, Kongo Kong (c), and Matt Sydal	Four-way match for the BCW Can-Am Heavyweight Championship	13:33
(c) / – the champion(s) heading into the match

== Back to Cali ==
Back to Cali
- Promotion(s): Impact Wrestling; Big Time Wrestling
- Date: December 1, 2018 (aired December 21, 2018)
- City: Salinas, California
- Venue: Salinas PAL Armory
- Attendance: 900

One Night Only chronology
← Previous; BCW 25th Anniversary	Next → New Beginnings

One Night Only: Back to Cali was a professional wrestling pay-per-view (PPV) event produced by Impact Wrestling in conjunction with Big Time Wrestling to be released exclusively on Global Wrestling Network.

No.	Results	Stipulations	Times
1	Eddie Edwards defeated Marcus Lewis	Singles match	13:49
2	Calder McColl defeated Kaka Meng	Singles match	05:11
3	Jules defeated Lisa Lace	Singles match	07:25
4	Eli Drake defeated Sledge	Singles match	10:28
5	Scotty Wringer defeated Tony Vargas	Singles match	05:55
6	Brian Cage & Rich Swann defeated Ohio Versus Everything (Dave Crist & Jake Crist)	Tag team match	09:41
7	Tessa Blanchard (c) defeated Kiera Hogan	Singles match for the Impact Knockouts Championship	09:39
8	Johnny Impact (c) defeated Moose	Singles match for the Impact World Championship	23:24
(c) / – the champion(s) heading into the match
