= List of Impact Wrestling Twitch specials =

This is a list of live professional wrestling events held by the American Professional wrestling promotion Impact Wrestling and seen exclusively on Twitch.

== 2018 ==
=== Brace for IMPACT (2018) ===
Brace for IMPACT
- Promotion(s): Impact Wrestling; WrestlePro
- Date: February 3, 2018 (aired February 9, 2018)
- City: Rahway, New Jersey
- Venue: Rahway Recreation Center

chronology
← Previous; First	Next → Last Chancery

Brace for IMPACT was a professional wrestling event produced by Impact Wrestling in conjunction with Wrestlepro to be released exclusively on Impact Wrestling's Twitch channel.

No.	Results	Stipulations
1	Chris Avery Queling, Delroy and Habib From The Car Wash defeated Reality Check (Chris Steeler, Kevin Matthews and Talon)	Six Man tag team match
2	Colby Covington defeated Tyquil Woodley	Singles match
3	Chris Payne and Matt Sydal defeated The Heavenly Bodies (Desirable Dustin and Gigolo Justin)	Tag Team match
4	Moose defeated Shawn Donavan	Singles match
5	Alberto El Patron defeated Fallah Bahh	Singles match
6	Nikki Addams and Nikos Rikos defeated Allie and Braxton Sutter	Mixed Tag team match
7	Bobby Wayward defeated Teddy Hart	Singles match
8	Craig Steele defeated Buster Jackson and Joe Keys and John Hartnett and Micah Jenkins and Richard Sharpe	Six-way match
9	Anthony Bowens defeated Eli Drake and Matt Macintosh	Three-way match
10	Johnny Impact defeated Dan Maff	Singles match
11	Tenille Dashwood defeated Angelina Love	Singles match

=== Last Chancery ===
Last Chancery
- Promotion(s): Impact Wrestling; Border City Wrestling
- Date: March 4, 2018 (aired March 9, 2018)
- City: Mississauga, Ontario, Canada
- Venue: Don Kolov Arena

chronology
← Previous; Brace for IMPACT	Next → Impact Wrestling vs. Lucha Underground

Last Chancery was a professional wrestling event co-produced by Impact Wrestling and Border City Wrestling which aired exclusively on Impact Wrestling's Twitch channel.

No.	Results	Stipulations	Times
1	Tyson Dux defeated Braxton Sutter	Singles match	10:38
2	The Desi Hit Squad (Gursinder Singh and Rohit Raju) defeated The Deaners (Cody Deaner and Cousin Jake)	Tag team match	9:02
3	Petey Williams defeated Brent Banks, Idris Abraham and Phil Atlas	Four-way match	16:00
4	Trevor Lee defeated Josh Alexander	Singles match	10:20
5	Eli Drake defeated Markus Burke	Singles match	8:30
6	Alberto El Patron defeated Moose	Singles match	13:14
7	Allie (c) defeated K. C. Spinelli	Singles match for the Impact Knockouts Championship	7:25
8	Austin Aries (c) defeated Matt Sydal and Kongo Kong (with Jimmy Jacobs)	Three-way match for the Impact World Championship	13:37
(c) / – the champion(s) heading into the match

=== Impact Wrestling vs. Lucha Underground ===
Impact Wrestling vs. Lucha Underground
- Promotion(s): Impact Wrestling; Lucha Underground
- Date: April 6, 2018
- City: New Orleans, Louisiana
- Venue: Sugar Mill

chronology
← Previous; Last Chancery	Next → Penta Does Iowa

Impact Wrestling vs. Lucha Underground was a professional wrestling livestreaming event co-produced by Impact Wrestling and Lucha Underground. The event took place on April 6, 2018 at the Sugar Mill in New Orleans, Louisiana and was streamed live on Impact Wrestling's Twitch channel.

No.	Results	Stipulations	Times
1	Matanza Cueto defeated Caleb Konley, Chavo Guerrero Jr., Jack Evans, Matt Sydal and Moose	Six-way match	6:40
2	Allie (c) defeated Taya Valkyrie	Singles match for the Impact Knockouts Championship	9:14
3	Scott Steiner and Teddy Hart defeated oVe (Dave Crist and Jake Crist)	Tag team match	7:44
4	Aero Star, Drago and King Cuerno defeated Andrew Everett, Dezmond Xavier and DJ Z	Six Man Tag Team Match	10:14
5	Trevor Lee defeated Marty Martinez (with Famous B)	Singles match	5:10
6	Latin American Exchange (Santana and Ortiz) (c) defeated Killshot and The Mack	Tag Team match for the Impact World Tag Team Championship	13:14
7	Brian Cage defeated Eli Drake	Singles match	7:12
8	Jeremiah Crane defeated Eddie Edwards	I Quit Match	20:14
9	Pentagón Dark defeated Austin Aries and Fénix	Three-way match	10:24
(c) / – the champion(s) heading into the match

=== Penta Does Iowa ===
Penta Does Iowa
- Promotion(s): Impact Wrestling; The Wrestling Revolver
- Date: May 5, 2018
- City: Des Moines, Iowa
- Venue: Val Air Ballroom

chronology
← Previous; Impact Wrestling vs. Lucha Underground	Next → RISE of the Knockouts

Penta Does Iowa was a professional wrestling event produced by Impact Wrestling in conjunction with The Wrestling Revolver to be released exclusively on Impact Wrestling's Twitch channel.

No.	Results	Stipulations
1	Pentagón Jr. defeated Jimmy Jacobs	Street Fight match for the Impact World Championship
2	Rich Swann defeated Ace Austin, Air Wolf, Andy Dalton, Chip Day, Gringo Loco, Larry D, Matt Palmer (c) and Sugar Dunkerton	Scramble match for the PWR Scramble Championship
3	Tommy Dreamer defeated Jake Manning	Hardcore match
4	oVe (Dave Crist, Jake Crist and Sami Callihan) defeated Matt Sydal and The Rascalz (Dezmond Xavier and Zachary Wentz)	Six Man Tag Team Match
5	The Dirty (Austin Manix and Brandon Edwards) defeated Zero Gravity (Brett Gakiya and CJ Esparza) and The Night Ryderz (Alex Colon and Dustin Rayz)	Three-way Tag Team match
6	Jason Cade (with Famous B) defeated Shane Strickland	Singles match
7	Taya Valkyrie defeated Jessicka Havok	Singles match
8	Eli Drake defeated Clayton Gainz	Singles match
(c) / – the champion(s) heading into the match

=== RISE of the Knockouts ===
RISE of the Knockouts
- Promotion(s): Impact Wrestling; Rise Wrestling
- Date: July 7, 2018
- City: Naperville, Illinois
- Venue: Illinois Basketball Academy

chronology
← Previous; Penta Does Iowa	Next → Confrontation

RISE of the Knockouts was a professional wrestling event produced by Impact Wrestling in conjunction with Rise Wrestling to be released exclusively on Impact Wrestling's Twitch channel.

No.	Results	Stipulations
1	Tessa Blanchard defeated Kris Wolf	Singles match
2	The Twisted Sisters (Holidead and Thunder Rosa) defeated Karen Q and Ray Lyn	Tag Team match
3	Madison Rayne defeated Kikyo	Singles match
4	Kimber Lee defeated Shazza McKenzie	Singles match
5	Su Yung (c) defeated Saraya Knight	Falls Count Anywhere match for the Impact Knockouts Championship
6	Paradise Lost (Dust and Raven's Ash) (with Rosemary) defeated Fire And Nice (Britt Baker and Chelsea Green) and The Blue Nation (Charli Evans and Jessica Troy) and Kylie Rae and Miranda Alize	Four Way Elimination Tag Team match for the Guardians of Rise Championship
7	Tessa Blanchard defeated Mercedes Martinez	30-minute Iron Man match for the vacant Phoenix of Rise Championship
(c) / – the champion(s) heading into the match

=== Confrontation ===
Confrontation
- Promotion(s): Impact Wrestling; America's Most Liked Wrestling
- Date: July 29, 2018
- City: Greensboro, North Carolina
- Venue: Triad Stage

chronology
← Previous; RISE of the Knockouts	Next → Uncivil War

Confrontation was a professional wrestling event produced by Impact Wrestling in conjunction with America's Most Liked Wrestling to be released exclusively on Impact Wrestling's Twitch channel.

No.	Results	Stipulations
1	Tessa Blanchard (with Tully Blanchard) defeated Allie and Kristen Stadtlander	Three-way match
2	Suicide defeated Jaxon Stone	Singles match
3	Zane Dawson (with George South) defeated Fallah Bahh	Singles match
4	Axton Ray defeated Eli Drake	Singles match
5	Eddie Edwards defeated Chris Payne	Singles match
6	Billy Brash (c) defeated Brandon Scott and Cam Carter and Devin Driscoll and Sean Denny (with Mark Denny) and Yahya	Six-way Ladder match for the AML Prestige Championship
7	The Heavenly Bodies (Desirable Dustin and Gigolo Justin) defeated C. W. Anderson and Preston Quinn (c)	Tag Team match for the AML Tag Team Championship
8	Caleb Konley (c) defeated Matt Sydal	Singles match for the AML Championship
(c) / – the champion(s) heading into the match

=== Uncivil War ===
Uncivil War
- Promotion(s): Impact Wrestling; Next Generation Wrestling
- Date: August 19, 2018
- City: Knoxville, Tennessee
- Venue: Knoxville Convention Center

chronology
← Previous; Confrontation	Next → Impact Wrestling vs. UK

Uncivil War was a professional wrestling event produced by Impact Wrestling in conjunction with Next Generation Wrestling. The event was held on August 19, 2018 at the Knoxville Convention Center in Knoxville, Tennessee and was streamed live on Impact Wrestling's Twitch channel.

No.	Results	Stipulations
1	A. R. Fox and Menace defeated Matt Sydal and Rich Swann	Tag Team match
2	Trevor Lee defeated Myron Reed	Singles match
3	Madison Rayne defeated Kikyo	Singles match
4	Nicole Pain defeated Su Yung	Singles match
5	Eli Drake defeated Joey Ryan	Singles match
6	The Lynch Mob (Joey Lynch and Matt Lynch) defeated The War Kings (Crimson and Jax Dane)	Tag Team match
7	Lenny Stratton defeated Eddie Edwards	Singles match
8	Moose defeated Shawn Hoodrich (with Lucky P. Larson)	Singles match
9	Sami Callihan defeated Matt Cross	Singles match

=== Impact Wrestling vs. UK ===
Impact Wrestling vs. UK
- Promotion: Impact Wrestling
- Date: September 9, 2018
- City: Manchester, England, United Kingdom
- Venue: Bowlers Exhibition Centre

chronology
← Previous; Uncivil War	Next → Ohio Versus Everything

Impact Wrestling vs. UK was a professional wrestling event produced by Impact Wrestling to be released exclusively on Impact Wrestling's Twitch channel.

No.	Results	Stipulations	Times
1	Rich Swann defeated Matt Sydal and Trevor Lee	Three-way match	8:59
2	Adam Maxted and Robbie X defeated Jake McCluskey and Lucas Steel	Tag Team match	11:05
3	Su Yung defeated Lana Austin	Singles match	10:49
4	Latin American Exchange (Santana and Ortiz) (c) defeated Jody Fleisch and Jonny Storm	Tag Team match for the Impact World Tag Team Championship	15:27
5	Joe Hendry defeated Eli Drake	Singles match	7:58
6	Eddie Edwards and Justin Sysum defeated Moose and Nathan Cruz	Tag Team match	18:00
7	Sami Callihan defeated Jimmy Havoc	Barbed Wire Baseball Bat Death match	17:50
(c) / – the champion(s) heading into the match

=== Ohio vs. Everything ===
Ohio vs. Everything
- Promotion(s): Impact Wrestling; Rockstar Pro Wrestling
- Date: December 14, 2018
- City: Dayton, Ohio
- Venue: Rockstar Pro Arena

chronology
← Previous; Impact Wrestling vs. UK	Next → Battle of Brooklyn

Ohio Versus Everything was a professional wrestling event produced by Impact Wrestling to be released exclusively on Impact Wrestling's Twitch channel.

No.	Results	Stipulations
1	Zachary Wentz defeated Jeremiah	Singles match
2	The Killer Death Machines (Jessicka Havok and Nevaeh) defeated Allie and Samantha Heights	Tag Team match
3	Moose defeated Madman Fulton	Singles match
4	Latin American Exchange (Santana and Ortiz) (c) defeated The Dirty (Austin Manix and Brandon Edwards) and The Besties In The World (Davey Vega and Mat Fitchett)	Three-way Tag Team match for the Impact World Tag Team Championship
5	Jon Murray defeated Stone Rockwell	Singles match
6	Trey Miguel defeated Ace Austin, Clayton Gainz, Kevin Bennett, Matt Sydal and Ron Mathis	Mosh Pit Scramble match
7	Eddie Edwards defeated Larry D	Singles match
8	oVe (Dave Crist, Jake Crist and Sami Callihan) defeated The Night Ryderz (Aaron Williams, Alex Colon and Dustin Rayz)	oVe Rules Six Man Tag Team Match
(c) / – the champion(s) heading into the match

== 2019 ==
=== Battle of Brooklyn ===
Battle of Brooklyn
- Promotion(s): Impact Wrestling; WrestlePro
- Date: January 26, 2019
- City: Bay Shore, New York
- Venue: St. Pats Cyo Sports

chronology
← Previous; Ohio vs. Everything	Next → Brace for IMPACT

Battle of Brooklyn was a professional wrestling event produced by Impact Wrestling to be released exclusively on Impact Wrestling's Twitch channel.

No.	Results	Stipulations
1	Nikos Rikos (c) defeated Talon	Singles match for WrestlePro Silver Championship
2	Pat Buck defeated Bobby Wayward	Singles match
3	Matt Macintosh defeated Rich Swann and TJ Crawford	Three way match
4	The Heavenly Bodies (Desirable Dustin and Gigolo Justin) defeated Fallah Bahh and KM	Tag Team match
5	Scarlett Bordeaux defeated Corinne Mink	Singles match
6	Moose defeated Craig Steele	Singles match
7	Eli Drake defeated Anthony Bowens	Singles match
8	Dan Maff defeated Kongo Kong	Singles match
(c) / – the champion(s) heading into the match

=== Brace for IMPACT (2019) ===
Brace for IMPACT
- Promotion(s): Impact Wrestling; SMASH Wrestling
- Date: February 2, 2019
- City: London, Ontario, Canada
- Venue: London Music Hall

chronology
← Previous; Battle of Brooklyn	Next → Opening Day

Brace for IMPACT was a professional wrestling event produced by Impact Wrestling to be released exclusively on Impact Wrestling's Twitch channel.

No.	Results	Stipulations
1	Kevin Bennett defeated Carter Mason and Sebastian Suave (with Kingdom James)	Three way match
2	Rosemary defeated Allie, KC Spinelli and Xandra Bale	Four way match
3	Mike Rollins defeated Cody Deaner	Singles match
4	Mark Wheeler defeated Kyle Boone	Singles match
5	Halal Beefcake (Idris Abraham and Joe Coleman) defeated The Pillars (Brent Banks and Tyson Dux) (c)	Tag team Tables match for the SMASH Tag Team Championship
6	The Rascalz (Trey Miguel and Zachary Wentz) defeated oVe (Dave Crist and Jake Crist)	Tag team match
7	TARIK (c) defeated Scotty O'Shea	Singles match for the SMASH Championship
8	Johnny Impact (c) defeated Sami Callihan	Singles match for the Impact World Championship
(c) / – the champion(s) heading into the match

=== Opening Day ===
Opening Day
- Promotion(s): Impact Wrestling; Rockstar Pro Wrestling
- Date: March 2, 2019
- City: Dayton, Ohio
- Venue: Dayton Convention Center

chronology
← Previous; Brace for IMPACT	Next → Salute to the Troops

Opening Day was a professional wrestling event produced by Impact Wrestling to be released exclusively on Impact Wrestling's Twitch channel.

No.	Results	Stipulations	Times
1	Moose defeated Jake Crist (with JT Davidson)	Singles match	10:01
2	Jeremiah defeated Aaron Williams, Crash Jaxon, Nate Wings, Rohit Raju and Ron Mathis	Mosh Pit Scramble match	8:36
3	The Killer Death Machines (Jessicka Havok and Nevaeh) defeated Madison Rayne and Samantha Heights	Tag team match	9:35
4	Ace Austin defeated JT Dunn	Singles match	14:04
5	Brian Cage defeated Ace Romero and Clayton Gainz	Three way match	12:00
6	Dave Crist and Madman Fulton (with JT Davidson) defeated Austin Manix and Jake Something, Grits And Gravy (Bruce Grey and Jon Murray) and Pompano Joe and Steve Manders	Four way Tag team match	10:57
7	Sami Callihan (with JT Davidson) defeated Eddie Edwards	Street fight	19:23
8	Johnny Impact (c) defeated Larry D	Singles match for the Impact World Championship	16:19
(c) / – the champion(s) heading into the match

=== Salute to the Troops ===
Salute to the Troops
- Promotion(s): Impact Wrestling; Tried-N-True Pro Wrestling
- Date: April 12, 2019 (aired May 11, 2019)
- City: Fort Campbell, Kentucky
- Venue: Fort Campbell Army Post

chronology
← Previous; Opening Day	Next → —

Salute for the Troops was a professional wrestling event produced by Impact Wrestling to be released exclusively on Impact Wrestling's Twitch channel.

No.	Results	Stipulations
1	Rich Swann (c) defeated Ace Austin, Caleb Konley and Jeremiah Plunkett	Four way match for the Impact X Division Championship
2	Chris Melendez defeated Sami Callihan	Singles match
3	Moose defeated The Rascalz (Trey and Wentz)	Handicap match
4	Eddie Edwards defeated Bram	Singles match
5	Brian Cage defeated Jake Crist	Singles match
6	Madison Rayne defeated Cali Young	Singles match
7	The War Kings (Crimson and Jax Dane) defeated Dave Crist and Madman Fulton	Tag team match
8	Johnny Impact defeated Crazzy Steve	Singles match
(c) / – the champion(s) heading into the match
