= St. Clair College Sportsplex =

Sports arena located in Windsor, Ontario, Canada

- Interactive map of St. Clair College Sportsplex
- Address: 2000 Talbot Road
- Location: Windsor, Ontario, Canada
- Coordinates: 42.2512°N 83.0202°W
- Owner: St. Clair College
- Capacity: 2,000

Construction
- Opened: 2014

Tenant
- St. Clair Saints (2014-present)

The St. Clair College Sportsplex is an arena and recreation center located in Windsor, Ontario, Canada on the campus of St. Clair College. It's been home to St. Clair College's sports teams since its opening in 2014.

== History ==
Since 1967, St. Clair College has used the nearby St. Clair College gymnasium as the venue for their varsity basketball and volleyball teams. Around 2013, construction had started on a 2,000-seat arena and fitness center which would serve as the new home for the Saints' varsity basketball and volleyball teams. On September 4, 2014, the sportsplex was opened to the public with the first event taking place being a basketball game against Lambton College on October 22, 2014. From 2020 to 2021, the arena served as a temporary COVID-19 field hospital for the Windsor Regional Hospital. On July 21, 2021, during the handover of the arena from the Windsor Regional Hospital back to St. Clair College, a plaque was installed inside the arena commemorating the period of service as a field hospital.

== Notable events ==
Since 2016, the arena has hosted the annual Fantastic Fathers Family Father's Day Charity Extravaganza which features live professional wrestling, stunt shows, inflatables, soapbox derby competitions, and magic shows. Since 2014, the arena has hosted professional wrestling events from Border City Wrestling (BCW), Impact Wrestling/Total Nonstop Action Wrestling (TNA), and Maple Leaf Pro Wrestling (MLP) ranging from non-televised events to television tapings and pay-per-view events.
