= Paparazzi Productions =

Professional wrestling stable

- Founder Alex Shelley featuring the Paparazzi Productions logo

Stable
- Members: Alex Shelley; Kevin Nash; Johnny Devine; Austin Starr
- Name: The Paparazzis
- Debut: May 2006
- Disbanded: April 2007

Paparazzi Productions was a villainous professional wrestling faction in Total Nonstop Action Wrestling. Started by Alex Shelley, it was inspired by his real-life interest in, and study of, wrestling videos. It grew to include Kevin Nash and Johnny Devine; Devine was later replaced by Austin Starr.

== History ==
=== Beginning (2005–2006) ===
Since late 2005, Shelley's gimmick involved using a camcorder to film his own matches, as well as recording the matches of other wrestlers from ringside. In January 2006, Jeff Jarrett hired him to gather counter-blackmail against Jackie Gayda and later Sting. After Destination X in March, Father James Mitchell hired Shelley to stalk NWA World Heavyweight Champion Christian Cage's wife.

=== A stable forms (2006) ===
In May, Alex Shelley interviewed Kevin Nash, who said that he was the main attraction of TNA and that the X Division was a bunch of no-talent hacks. At the end of the TNA 2006 World X Cup Tournament, Shelley abandoned his teammates in Team USA after they won the World X Cup and joined Nash on his assault of Chris Sabin. He started filming Nash as he attacked Sabin, Jay Lethal and Sonjay Dutt. He also helped Nash win a match against Sabin at Slammiversary. On June 29, Shelley enlisted Johnny Devine to be Paparazzi Production's production assistant. They wrestled as a tag team in a match on a special TNA Xplosion episode, as well as an Impact! non-title match versus the NWA Tag Team Champions A.J. Styles and Christopher Daniels. The team of Nash and Shelley lost to Sabin and Lethal at Victory Road on July 16.

Nash then decided he wanted to win the X Division Championship. He joined the Number One Contender match for the title against Chris Sabin at Hard Justice. Over the weekend, however, he suffered a mysterious neck injury and named Alex Shelley to replace him in the match. Nash went out of action due to the injury, while Shelley and Devine continued to wrestle in both singles and tag team action. Nash returned prior to Bound for Glory and held the Kevin Nash Open Invitational X Division Gauntlet Battle Royal, which was won by the debuting Austin Starr. Nash had taken an interest in Starr, which seemed to be at the behest of Shelley.

On the October 26 edition of Impact!, Shelley revealed that he had fired Devine due to insubordination (refusing to edit German snuff films) and Nash, in admiration, directed Shelley to record all of Austin Starr's actions. Despite the obvious resentment between Shelley and Starr, Nash decided to start the Paparazzi Championship Series X-Division tournament. Although the duo could not overcome the team of Ron Killings and Lance Hoyt at Genesis, Nash continued to show confidence in the team.

The Paparazzi Championship Series (PCS) began on December 10, 2006, at Turning Point, and the included contestants were Alex Shelley, Austin Starr, Senshi, Jay Lethal, and Sonjay Dutt. Shelley and Starr showed little teamwork, causing both men to lose, allowing Senshi to win the first challenge. The PCS featured several challenges over the weeks, including push-ups, pogo jumping, and limbo contests, along with games of musical chairs and Texas hold'em. It ended at Final Resolution where Shelley defeated Starr to become the PCS Champion.

=== Dissolution (2007) ===
Starr then developed a feud with Senshi after attacking him, and Shelley once again began taping matches. Nash started the "Paparazzi Idol" contest, featuring Sonjay Dutt and Jay Lethal developing "characters".

On the March 1 episode of Impact, Shelley and Starr teamed up with X Division Champion Chris Sabin to take on Dutt, Lethal and Jerry Lynn. During this brief period, Shelley and Starr finally seemed united, though both would go their separate ways once more. Meanwhile, Nash continued to work with Dutt and Lethal.

At Destination X Starr lost a match to Senshi and Shelley helped LAX beat Team 3D in a Ghetto Brawl. Shelley continued to work with LAX over the ensuing weeks, as well as filming more footage of Sting and James Mitchell, while Nash seemed to be working full-time with Lethal. At Lockdown, Starr was defeated by Senshi and Shelley lost an Xscape match for the X-Division Championship.

Starr was later released from the company. Shelley formed a tag team with Chris Sabin, The Motor City Machine Guns. Nash, despite initially promising to manage the duo, devoted his energies to Lethal and Kurt Angle.

== Members ==
- Alex Shelley – Founder
- Kevin Nash – Coach
- Johnny Devine – (May 2006 – October 2006)
- The Austin Starr – (October 2006 – April 2007).

== Championships and accomplishments ==
- Total Nonstop Action Wrestling
  - Paparazzi Championship Series (2007) – Alex Shelley
