= Petey Williams =

Canadian professional wrestler (born 1981)

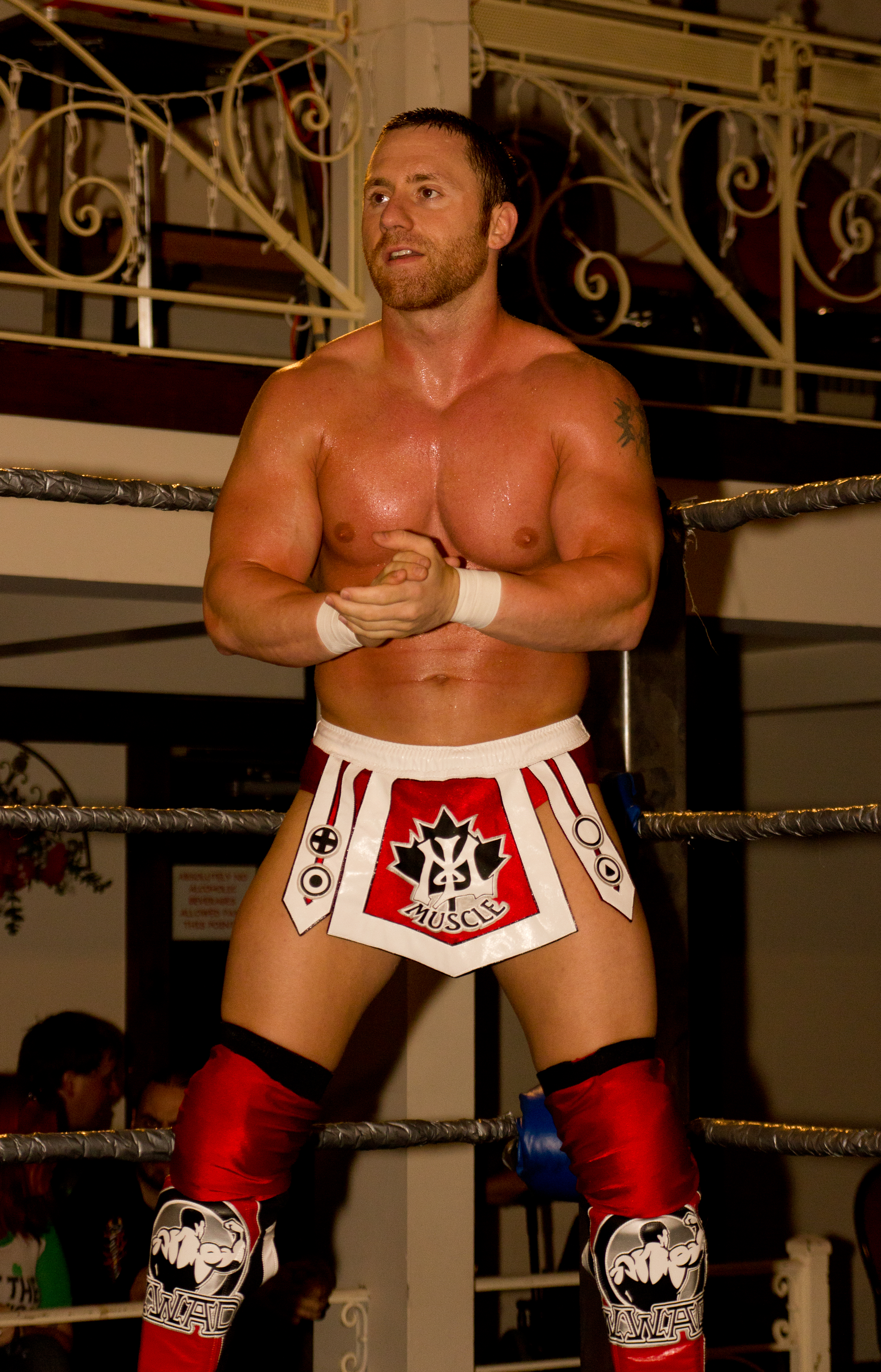
- Williams in 2012

Personal information
- Born: Peter Williams III; August 26, 1981 (age 45) Windsor, Ontario, Canada

Professional wrestling career
- Ring name: Petey Williams
- Billed height: 5 ft 7 in (1.70 m)
- Billed weight: 179 lb (81 kg)
- Billed from: Windsor, Ontario; Glendale, Arizona
- Trained by: Scott D'Amore
- Debut: October 14, 2001

Peter Williams III (born August 26, 1981) is a Canadian professional wrestler and musician. He is signed to WWE as a backstage producer. He is best known for his time in Impact Wrestling, where he is a two-time X Division Champion. He is also known for his time in Lucha Libre USA (LLUSA), where he held the Tag Team Championship with Jon Rekon. He is known by his nickname "The Canadian Destroyer", a reference to Doug Chevalier (Scott D'amore's original mentor) and also the name of his front flip piledriver finishing move.

== Professional wrestling career ==
=== Early career (2001–2004) ===
Williams was trained alongside Chris Sabin by Scott D'Amore at the Can-Am Wrestling School. Williams debuted in D'Amore's Windsor, Ontario-based Border City Wrestling promotion in 2001. He spent the next four years working on the independent circuit in Canada for Border City Wrestling; Blood, Sweat and Ears; and in the Northern United States for promotions such as NWA Cyberspace and Pro Wrestling Guerrilla.

=== Total Nonstop Action Wrestling ===
==== Team Canada (2004–2006) ====
Williams debuted in Total Nonstop Action Wrestling on February 25, 2004, a member of Team Canada. He and the remainder of Team Canada took part in the TNA 2004 World X Cup Tournament, but were defeated by Team Mexico and Team USA.

On August 11, 2004, Williams won the X Division Championship in a twenty-two man Gauntlet for the Gold match, entering at number eleven and pinning the Amazing Red to win the bout.

Early in his title reign, Williams claimed that the Canadian Destroyer could not be countered. According to Williams, Bully Ray told him to focus the entire match in his finishing move. However, after Williams successfully retained the title in a match with A.J. Styles at Victory Road on November 7, 2004, Chris Sabin began claiming that he was capable of countering the move. He went on to counter the Canadian Destroyer into his own finishing move, the "Cradle Shock", on three occasions in the month following Victory Road. However, Sabin was unable to defeat Williams for the X Division Championship at Turning Point on December 5, 2004. Williams's reign would last for five months and five days, (which would become the longest X Division title reign until Christopher Daniels won the title in 2005), before ending on January 16, 2005, at Final Resolution, where he was defeated by A.J. Styles in an Ultimate X match that also featured Sabin.

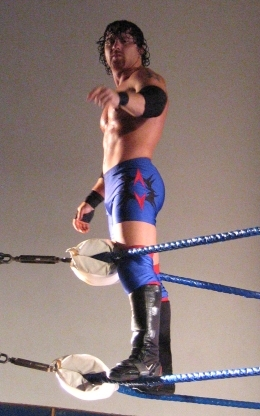
Petey Williams earlier in his career.

At Lockdown on April 24, 2005, Williams and fellow Team Canada member Eric Young unsuccessfully challenged America's Most Wanted for the NWA World Tag Team Championship. They challenged then-champions The Naturals at Slammiversary on June 19, 2005, but were once again defeated.

Williams returned to the X Division on July 17, 2005, at No Surrender, unsuccessfully challenging X Division Champion Christopher Daniels. Williams, along with the rest of Team Canada, would go on to join Planet Jarrett upon TNA's debut on Spike TV in October 2005. After winning an Ultimate X match at Bound for Glory on October 23, Williams received a title shot against A.J. Styles at Genesis on November 13, but was again defeated. Williams would resume wrestling in the X Division and faced off against Chris Sabin, Elix Skipper, Shark Boy, Puma and Chase Stevens in an Xscape Match at Lockdown. Williams and Sabin were the final two competitors, but Williams lost after Sabin was able to climb over the cage and escape.

Williams again acted as the captain of Team Canada in the 2006 World X Cup Tournament. He lost to Jushin Thunder Liger at Sacrifice in a Captain vs. Captain semifinal match, but won the Gauntlet Match final to tie the points with Team USA. On the following edition of Impact!, he lost to Team USA captain Chris Sabin in a tiebreaker singles match.

On the June 29 episode of Impact!, Jim Cornette announced that Team Canada would be disbanded immediately. However, they were given one last chance to stay intact if they won a match a week later against Jay Lethal, Rhino, and Team 3D. Team Canada lost the match when Lethal pinned A-1, officially disbanding Team Canada once and for all. On the July 27 edition of Impact!, Williams won an X Division four-way match by defeating Sonjay Dutt, Johnny Devine, and Shark Boy after hitting Shark Boy with the Canadian Destroyer. On the following week's Impact!, he defeated Jay Lethal, Sonjay Dutt, Kazarian and Alex Shelley and became the number one contender to the X Division Championship.

At Hard Justice, Williams challenged the X Division Champion Senshi in a triple threat match also involving Jay Lethal. During the match, Williams used the Canadian Destroyer on Lethal and was about to attempt a pinfall until Senshi dropkicked Williams out of the ring and pinned Lethal to retain his championship.

==== Various feuds (2006–2007) ====
Williams was invited to watch Latin American Xchange burn the American flag during the November 16 edition of Impact!, but he would make his first face turn after refusing to torch the flag. Williams was then involved in the feud between America's Most Wanted and the Latin American Xchange. At Genesis, Homicide had Gail Kim set up for Da Gringo Killa, but Williams came in with a lead pipe to make the save.

On the following Impact!, Williams was later named as Kurt Angle's tag team partner to face LAX for the NWA World Tag Team Championship, but he was ambushed before the match by LAX. Samoa Joe would then replace Williams as Angle's partner. On the following week, Williams would go one on one against Homicide and defeated him via roll-up. After the match though, Homicide, Hernandez and Konnan started to beat down Williams followed by Hernandez hitting him with the Border Toss. AMW would then come out to make the save and then steal the Mexican flag. At Turning Point, Williams came out to help AMW in their flag match against LAX. During the match, he attempted the Canadian Destroyer on Konnan, but he was stopped by Hernandez. On the December 14 edition of Impact!, the LAX defeated AMW in a title vs. team match after James Storm hit Chris Harris with a beer bottle, permanently disbanding AMW. After AMW's dissolution, their former manager Gail Kim became Williams' valet. The two later faced and were defeated by James Storm and Jacqueline Moore at Against All Odds. Petey soon split from Kim and then became involved in a storyline with former Team Canada partners Eric Young and Robert Roode as Williams' tried to help Young get out of a contract that Roode had Young signed to. The feud continued until Lockdown, where Williams faced Roode. Despite using a hockey stick, Williams was pinned by Roode after a Payoff to win the match. He later competed in the Ultimate X match at Victory Road, but was the second competitor eliminated from the match. Soon after, he remained completely unseen on television. On the October 25 edition of Impact!, he participated in a fatal four way X Division style match against Havok, Sonjay Dutt and Shark Boy, but the match went to a no-contest after Team 3D interfered and put both Williams and Havok through tables. On the November 1 edition of Impact!, Williams and the entire X Division attacked Team 3D.

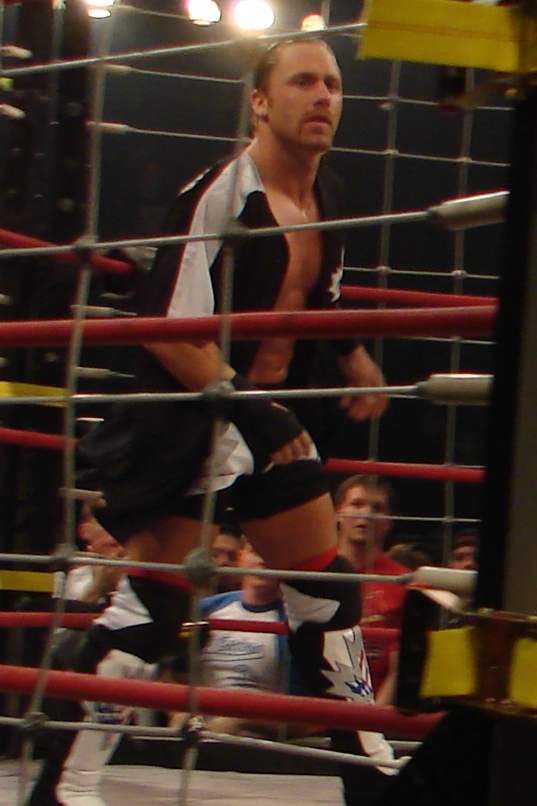
Petey Williams at Lockdown 2007.

==== Maple Leaf Muscle (2007–2008) ====
After the feud between the X Division and Team 3D died down, Williams began talking about bodybuilding and was often working out during interviews and referring to himself as "Little Poppa Pump". At Turning Point, he won one of the briefcases in the Feast or Fired match. Scott Steiner, who also won one of the briefcases, would later trade cases with Williams, which unintentionally gave Petey a World Heavyweight Championship shot in the process.

In subsequent matches, Williams would bring down the briefcase to the ring and place it near the turnbuckle. During one of his matches, Steiner entered the arena and switched Petey's world title match briefcase with the original X Division Championship match briefcase. During a tag team match with Williams and Steiner against Rock 'n Rave Infection, Steiner stole both cases and left him to be pinned by Jimmy Rave. Williams and Steiner faced off at Against All Odds with the winner getting both briefcases. Steiner would go on to win the match and officially claim both briefcases. On the following Impact!, Williams once again came up short against Steiner, but after the match Steiner showed Williams respect.

Following this, Williams formed a team with Steiner and acquired the managerial services of Rhaka Khan in the process. Upon forming their alliance, Steiner and Khan put Williams through numerous initiations to prove himself worthy of their team. Williams and Steiner faced the Motor City Machine Guns in a tag team match, Petey won after pinning Alex Shelley. After the match, Williams had one more initiation to complete. Rhaka Khan brought out a black bag that contained a pair of scissors and a shaver. Steiner then cut and shaved Williams' hair, and gave him a chainlink headdress similar to Steiner's, cementing Williams' heel turn in the process. This also gave emphasis to the nickname "Little Petey Pump", a variation of Steiner's "Big Poppa Pump" nickname.

Williams later competed in the "Cuffed in the Cage" match at Lockdown, but lost to the eventual winner Eric Young. On the April 17 edition of Impact!, Steiner gave him the X Division title shot briefcase. Later in the same episode, after Jay Lethal's match against Johnny Devine, Williams attacked Lethal from behind, cashed in the title shot and won his second X Division Championship. Two weeks later at a taping of Impact!, Williams' orbital bone was fractured during a match. However, Williams recovered from his injury and returned at Slammiversary to successfully defend his title against Kaz and again on the Impact! after Slammiversary.

At Hard Justice, Williams retained his X Division Championship against Consequences Creed due to interference from Sheik Abdul Bashir. At No Surrender on September 14, he lost the X Division title in a triple threat match after Bashir pinned Consequences Creed. Upon losing his title, Williams had a face turn when he was attacked by Bashir as well as Rock 'n Rave Infection. Williams would then participate in the Steel Asylum Match at Bound for Glory IV, but came up short as Jay Lethal won.

==== The Frontline (2008–2009) ====
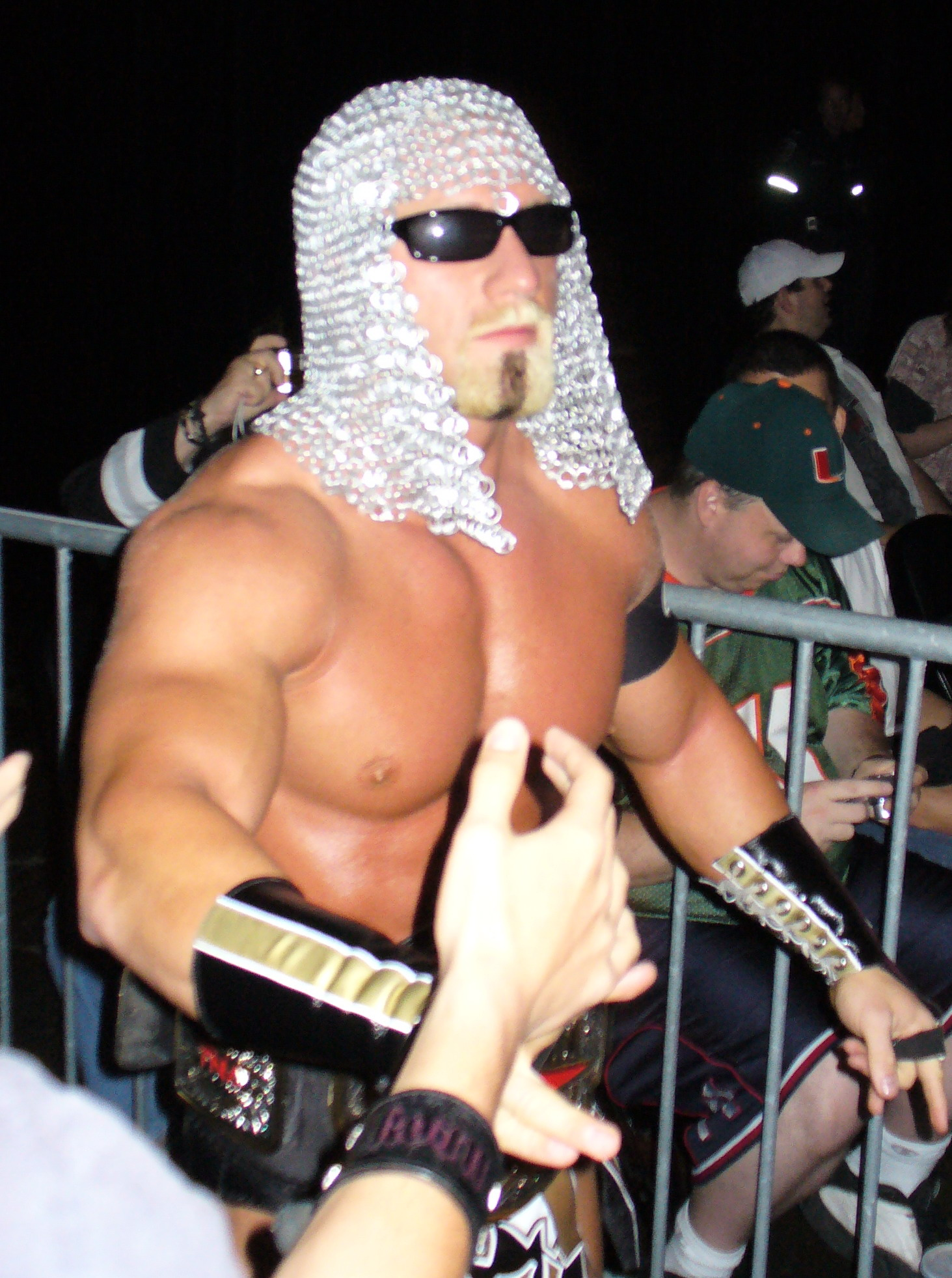
Williams as "Little Petey Pump" during a show in London, Ontario in 2008

On the October 30 edition of Impact!, Williams along with A.J. Styles, Samoa Joe, Jay Lethal, Consequences Creed, Eric Young, O.D.B. and The Motor City Machine Guns formed a faction of younger wrestlers, known as The Frontline, to oppose The Main Event Mafia (Sting, Kurt Angle, Kevin Nash, Booker T and Sharmell). Later that night, Scott Steiner returned from his injury, attacked Williams' allies and joined the Main Event Mafia. Unlike the rest of the MEM, Steiner spared Williams from a beating.

On the November 13 edition of Impact!, after seemingly being in-between the two sides, Williams suffered a beating at the hands of the Main Event Mafia, which included Steiner tossing Williams off a ladder and busting him open and as a result, ended his affiliation with Williams thus turning Williams into a face character. Williams returned on the January 15 edition of Impact! attacking Scott Steiner while referee Earl Hebner was distracted by guest enforcer Mick Foley. Williams cost Steiner the match with a missile dropkick leading to AJ Styles hitting the Pelé on Steiner for the win. Williams and AJ embraced after the match. Williams would go on to lose to Steiner at Against All Odds, and once again on the following Impact! in a "Head Dress on a Pole" match, effectively ending their feud.

In January 2009, TNA informed Williams that the company would not renew his contract that was expiring later that month. Williams wrestled his last match for the company on February 10, at the tapings of the February 19 edition of Impact!, when he teamed with former Team Canada partner Eric Young to take on Beer Money, Inc. for the World Tag Team Title. He was pinned in the match, and due to a previous stipulation, was banished from TNA.

=== Independent circuit (2009–2014) ===
After departing from TNA, Williams made a one-night return to Border City Wrestling on March 28 to compete in an eight-man gauntlet match to determine who would claim the vacant Heavyweight Championship. Tyson Dux ultimately won the match and the title. On April 17, Williams began wrestling for All Japan Pro Wrestling during their newly introduced Junior Tag League with Phil Atlas as his tag team partner. On April 29, the final night of the Tag League, Williams and Atlas defeated F4 (Hiroshi Yamato and Kai) to claim third place. Williams returned to AJPW in late August to compete in the Junior League, where he only won one match. Upon his return to the US, Williams participated in the PWS King Of The Ring 2009 and reached the finals before losing to Aden Chambers.

On November 7, Williams made his debut for Pro Wrestling Xtreme and defeated Matt Burns in a singles match. He made his second and final appearance for the promotion exactly one month later, where he defeated Michael Elgin. On November 13, Williams redebuted for Border City Wrestling and reunited with Scott D'Amore in a winning effort over Joe Doering and Tyson Dux with Kurt Angle as the special guest referee. Williams made his debut for Capital City Championship Combat on November 21, where he reformed Team Canada with Johnny Devine in a winning effort over The Untouchables (Dan Paysan and Jimmy Stone). On February 7, 2010, Williams debuted in Canadian Wrestling's Elite at their Collision Course event. He defeated Bobby Jay to qualify for a four-way match for the vacant title later on in the event, but was unable to win the championship.

On July 16, 2010, Williams made his debut for Collective League Of Adrenaline Strength And Honor (CLASH) in the first round of the NPCI 2010 Tag Team Tournament where he teamed up with Zach Gowen to lose to Gavin Quinn and Tommy Treznik. Williams made his return on February 26, 2011, when he took on Gavin Quinn for the CLASH Championship and lost. He received another shot at the title in August and once again lost. On January 21, 2012, Williams defeated Quinn in a three-way match for the CLASH Championship which also included J. Miller. Afterwards, Williams went on a singles winning streak which included multiple championship defences against the likes of Alex Shelley. He lost the title to J. Miller on January 17, 2013. On June 22, 2013, at House of Hardcore 2 Williams defeated Alex Reynolds and Tony Nese in a three-way match but lost in a rematch on November 9, 2013, at House of Hardcore 3. On May 9, 2014, at Border City Wrestling's East Meets West event Williams teamed with Brent B in a losing effort over Time Splitters (Alex Shelley & Kushida) in Match 2 of BCW vs. NJPW Series. Later in May 2014, Petey was defeated by JP Simms in a match for the IFWA Heavyweight Championship at a WrestleCentre Voltage taping, following a Simmulator. On June 6 at House of Hardcore 4 Williams defeated Tony Nese and Alex Reynolds in a Three-way match. On June 7 at House of Hardcore 5 Williams teamed with Tony Nese in a losing effort over Bad Influence (Christopher Daniels & Frankie Kazarian).

=== Ring of Honor (2009–2010) ===
After returning to the US on May 1, Williams wrestled two shows for Ring of Honor on June 26 and 27, respectively, the first being a six-man mayhem match, which was won by Austin Aries at Violent Tendencies, and the second being a singles match at End of an Age, which he lost to Kenny King. On September 18, Williams returned to Ring of Honor where he and Colt Cabana defeated Austin Aries and Rhett Titus. The next day, Williams defeated Titus in a singles match. On September 25, Williams wrestled in a four-corner survival match involving El Generico, Chris Hero and Claudio Castagnoli, which was won by Castagnoli. The next day at Glory by Honor VIII, he competed against Aries for the World Championship, but lost. On October 9, Williams lost another four-corner survival match to Castagnoli. The next day, he lost to Castagnoli in a qualifying match for the Survival of the Fittest elimination match. On March 19, 2010, at Gold Rush, he returned to ROH in a losing effort to Austin Aries. On March 20 at Epic Encounter III, he lost to World Television Champion Eddie Edwards in a title match.

=== Lucha Libre USA (2010–2012) ===
On December 12, 2010, Williams made his debut for Lucha Libre USA, forming a heel, anti-illegal immigration tag team named "The Right" with R. J. Brewer. On February 19, 2011, Williams was defeated by LA Park, This episode aired on tape delay on October 15, 2011. On March 19, 2011, Williams along with R. J. Brewer & Jon Rekon defeated Rocky Romero, Super Nova, & Magno in a 6-man tag match. later on in the main event Williams took part in the lucha roulette elimination number one contenders match for the LLUSA Heavyweight Championship, which was won by Charly Malice. On May 28, 2011, Williams and Jon Rekon defeated Jay Lethal & Magno in a Number one contenders match for the Vacant Tag Tag Championships. On June 18, 2011, Williams and his stablemate in The Right, Jon Rekon, defeated the Latin Liberators (Rocky Romero and Super Nova) to win the vacant LLUSA Tag Team Championship. On January 22, 2011, Williams defeated Charly Malice due to an interference from the leader of "The Right" R. J. Brewer, This episode aired on tape delay on October 22, 2011.

On April 21, 2012, Williams announced he had parted ways with Lucha Libre USA.

=== Return to TNA (2013–2014) ===
On January 12, 2013, Williams returned to TNA to take part in the tapings of the One Night Only: X-Travaganza special, teaming with Sonjay Dutt in a tag team match, where they were defeated by Bad Influence (Christopher Daniels and Kazarian). On March 17, Williams also took part in the tapings of the 10 Reunion pay-per-view, during which he wrestled in a three-way match, where he and Sonjay Dutt were defeated by Kenny King. The following day, Williams teamed with Dutt for the tapings of the TNA Tag Team Tournament pay-per-view, though they were eliminated in their first round match by Generation Me (Max and Jeremy Buck). On December 6 tapings of the World Cup of Wrestling pay-per-view, Williams teamed with Funaki as part of Team International but lost to Team Aces & Eights' D.O.C. and Knux. Williams returned to television on the March 28 episode of Impact Wrestling, defeating Mason Andrews and Sonjay Dutt in a three-way match to become the number one contender for the X Division Championship. Williams received his title shot on the April 18 episode of Impact Wrestling, but was defeated by the defending champion Kenny King in a three-way match that also involved Zema Ion. On May 23 episode of Impact Wrestling, Williams faced Joey Ryan and Suicide in a number one contender's match for an X Division Championship match at Slammiversary, which Suicide won after pinning Ryan. At the special Destination X episode of Impact Wrestling on July 18, Williams wrestled in a three-way match against Homicide and Sonjay Dutt for a chance to compete for the vacant X Division Championship, which was ultimately won by Dutt. On April 12, 2014 (aired August 1) at X-Travaganza 2014. Williams was defeated by Tigre Uno and this was his final match in TNA.

On July 3, 2014, Williams announced he would be retiring from professional wrestling. His final match took place two days later in a losing effort against Chris Sabin at an XICW event.

=== Second return to Impact Wrestling (2017–2021) ===
On August 17, 2017, at Destination X, Williams returned to Impact, interfering in an Impact X Division Championship ladder match between Sonjay Dutt and Trevor Lee. Williams executed the Canadian Destroyer on the interfering Caleb Konley. On the August 31 episode of Impact Wrestling, Williams defeated Konley. At Victory Road, Williams lost to Trevor Lee in an X Division Championship match. At Bound for Glory, Williams competed in a six-way match for the Impact X Division Championship, but failed to win the match. On the November 16 episode of Impact Wrestling, Williams was defeated by L. A. Knight in an Impact World Championship match. On the March 15, 2018, episode of Impact Wrestling, Williams competed in Feast or Fired match where he got a case that revealed he got an X Division Championship match. At Redemption, Willams would use the case for a title shot against Matt Sydal, but would lose the match. At Slammiversary XVI, Williams competed in a four-way match that was won by Johnny Impact. At Rebellion (2019), Williams competed in a six-way match which was won by Ace Austin. At Unbreakable, Williams, Scott Steiner and Jordynne Grace defeated Dicky Mayer, Gentleman Jervis and Ryan Taylor. On the November 5 episode of Impact Wrestling, Williams lost to Bhupinder Singh.

At Hardcore Justice, Williams and Josh Alexander defeated TJP and Fallah Bahh, and Ace Austin and Madman Fulton in a triple threat tag team match. At Under Siege, Williams and TJP competed in a four-way tag team match to determine the number one contender for the Impact World Tag Team Championship which was won by Ace Austin and Madman Fulton. At Against All Odds, Williams competed in a five-way match to determine the #1 contender for the Impact X Division Championship which ended in a no contest. At Slammiversary, Williams competed in an Ultimate X match for the Impact X Division Championship which was won by Josh Alexander. At Homecoming, Williams and Jordynne Grace lost to Matt Cardona and Chelsea Green in a first round match in the Homecoming tournament. At Emergence, Williams lost to Steve Maclin. At Victory Road, Williams lost to Steve Maclin in a 3 Way match that also involved TJP. He left Impact in November 2021.

=== WWE (2022–present) ===
In January 2022, it was reported Williams had signed with WWE as a producer. He appeared on the December 5, 2022 edition of Raw breaking up the brawl alongside various WWE officials between Bobby Lashley and Seth "Freakin" Rollins only for him to get accidentally speared by Lashley. He would suffer the exact same fate just over three years later on the March 30, 2026 edition of Raw, this time being on the accidental receiving end of a Roman Reigns spear in the midst of a brawl between Reigns and CM Punk.

== Professional wrestling style and persona ==
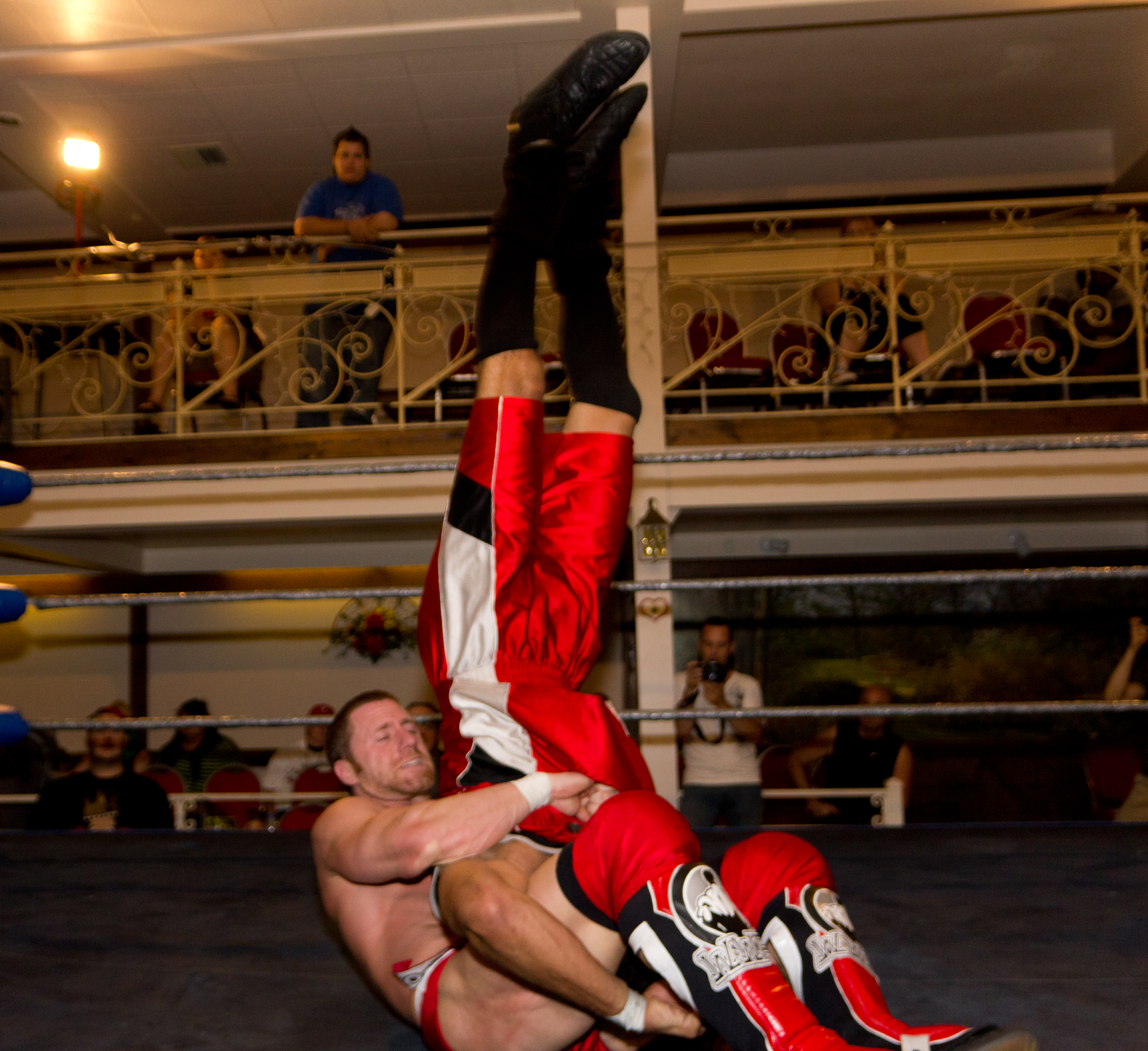
Petey Williams performing the Canadian Destroyer on Brent B

Having popularised the sunset flip piledriver, which he called the Canadian Destroyer, Williams has been credited as the inventor of the move, though there is evidence of Amazing Red performing it in the 1990s. According to Williams, the move was suggested to him in 2003 while travelling to an IWA Mid-South show along with Chris Sabin and Truth Martini. Williams and Sabin originally planned to use the move in their match together but decided against it. The next month, Williams debuted the move in a match against Matt Sydal. During the mid 2000s, it was viewed as a powerful and popular move; the devastation of the piledriver combined with the acrobatics of the flip appeared like an animation from a video game. In the 2010s, several wrestlers adopted the Canadian Destroyer as a transition move. Williams has complained about this fact as his move was intended to be a finishing maneuver. In the later part of the 2010s, many wrestlers began to use the Canadian Destroyer as finishers, such as Adam Cole, which he calls the "Panama Sunrise".

== Other media ==
He appeared in the video game TNA Impact! as a downloadable character.

== Personal life ==
Williams plays guitar and harmonica in a band called The High Crusade, which also includes former TNA wrestlers Alex Shelley and Chris Sabin and their friends Adam Tatro and Chris Plumb. The band released their debut album, It's Not What You Think, on September 7, 2010.

Petey has been married and divorced twice and has children from both marriages (three in total).

== Championships and accomplishments ==
- Alliance Championship Wrestling
  - ACW Junior Heavyweight Championship (1 time)
- Border City Wrestling
  - BCW Can-Am Television Championship (1 time)
  - BCW Can-Am Tag Team Championship (1 time) – with Bobby Roode
- CLASH Wrestling
  - CLASH Championship (1 time)
  - CLASH Tag Team Championship (1 time) – with The Canadian Destroyer
- East Coast Wrestling Association
  - Super 8 Tournament (2005)
- Elite Wrestling Revolution
  - EWR Heavyweight Championship (2 times)
- Independent Wrestling Association Mid-South
  - IWA Mid-South Heavyweight Championship (1 time)
- Lucha Libre USA
  - LLUSA Tag Team Championship (1 time) – with Jon Rekon
- Metro Pro Wrestling
  - MPW Cruiserweight Championship (1 time)
- New Korea Pro Wrestling Association
  - NKPWA Junior Heavyweight Championship (1 time)
- NWA Upstate
  - NWA Upstate No Limits Championship (1 time)
- Prime Time Wrestling
  - PTW Heavyweight Championship (1 time)
  - King Of The Cruiserweight Tournament (2006)
- Pro Wrestling Illustrated
  - Ranked No. 23 of the top 500 singles wrestlers in the PWI 500 in 2005
- Pure Pro Wrestling
  - PPW Franchise Championship (1 time)
- Resistance Pro Wrestling
  - RPW King Of The Night Life Championship (1 time)
- Total Nonstop Action Wrestling/Impact Wrestling
  - TNA X Division Championship (2 times)
  - Gauntlet for the Gold (2004, 2008 – TNA X Division Championship)
  - Feast or Fired (2007, 2018 – X Division Championship contract)^{2}
  - TNA Year End Awards (3 times)
    - Finisher of the Year (2004–2006) Canadian Destroyer
- Ultimate Championship Wrestling
  - UCW Lightweight Championship (1 time)
- Universal Wrestling Alliance
  - UWA Tag Team Championship (1 time) – with Bobby Roode
- Wrestling Observer Newsletter
  - Best Wrestling Maneuver (2004, 2005) Canadian Destroyer
  - Rookie of the Year (2004)
- Xtreme Intense Championship Wrestling
  - XICW Light Heavyweight Championship (1 time)

^{1} Scott Steiner won a match with the other Feast or Fired winners for an opportunity to trade his unopened case with someone else choosing Williams' case and when his new case was opened it contained the World Heavyweight Title match. Later he was defeated by Steiner to win both cases.
^{2} Steiner later gave back his original briefcase.

== See also ==
- Team Canada
