= Johnny Devine =

Canadian professional wrestler (born 1974)

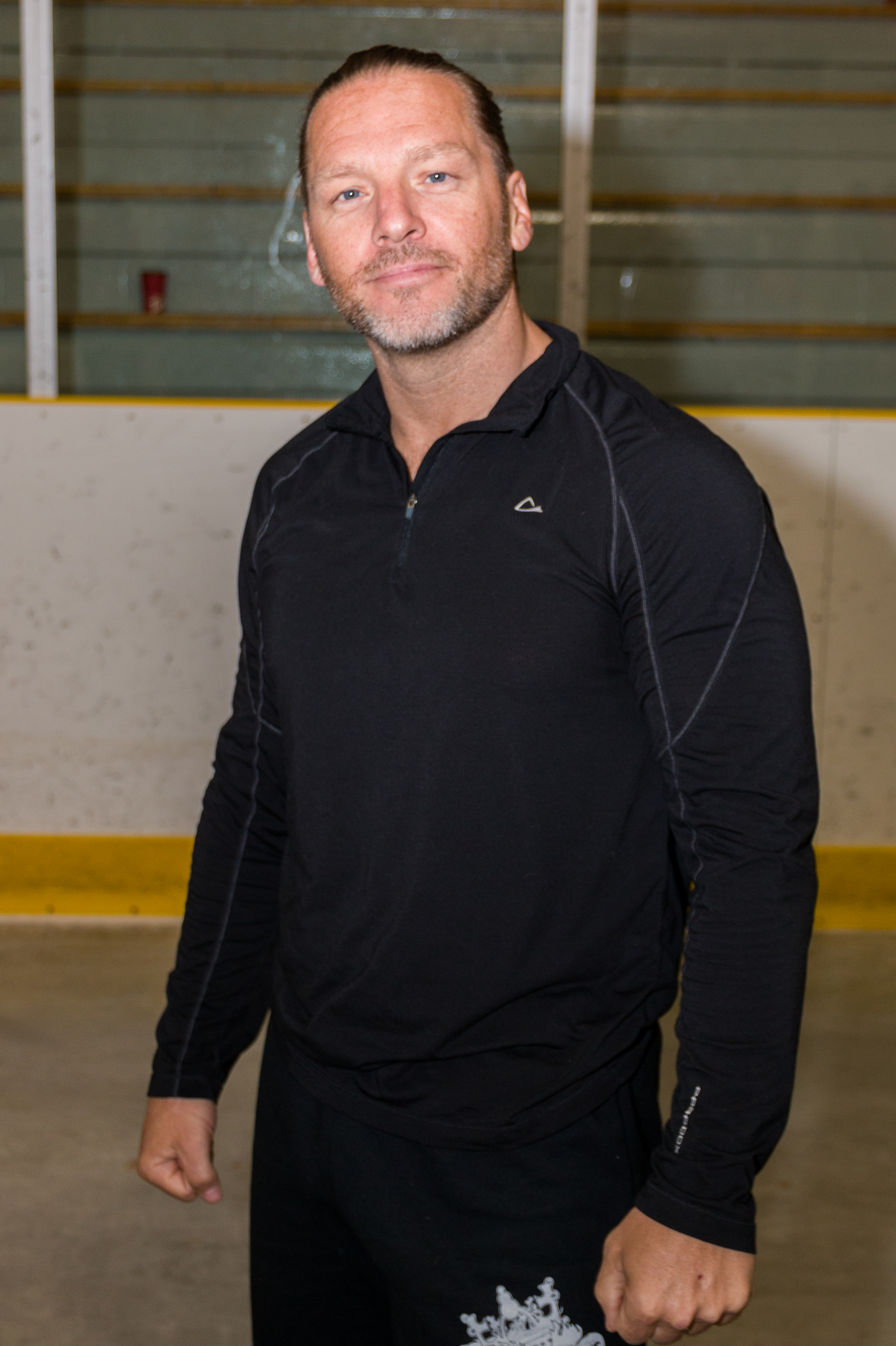
- Devine in 2016

Personal information
- Born: John Parsonage; April 27, 1974 (age 52) Merritt, British Columbia, Canada

Professional wrestling career
- Ring name(s): J.P. Parsons; Johnny Devine; Havok; Brother Devine
- Billed height: 5 ft 10 in (1.78 m)
- Billed weight: 222 lb (101 kg)
- Billed from: Winnipeg, Manitoba; Reno, Nevada; Calgary, Alberta
- Trained by: Allen Coage; Scott D'Amore; Bruce Hart; Stu Hart, Davey Boy Smith
- Debut: October 27, 1997

John Parsonage (born April 27, 1974) is a Canadian semi-retired professional wrestler, better known by his ring name Johnny Devine. He is best known for his time in Total Nonstop Action Wrestling.

== Professional wrestling career ==
=== Early years (1997-2004) ===
As a teenager, John and his friends organized and competed in a wrestling show. After graduating from Garden City Collegiate high school, Devine relocated to the United States, attending college in Minnesota. After graduating, he joined the Canadian infantry, and met Bret Hart while posted to Calgary, Alberta in 1997. Devine then decided to train as a wrestler. He began training in August 1997 in the infamous Hart Dungeon under Bruce Hart, a son of the legendary Stu Hart. He debuted on October 27, 1997, facing "Gorgeous" Vinny Vegas (not to be confused with Vinnie Vegas). Devine then wrestled for various independent promotions in Western Canada, and in April 1999 he joined the resurrected Stampede Wrestling, a wrestling promotion operated by the Hart family, at times forgoing pay when attendances were poor and takings low. As part of the Stampede Wrestling roster, Devine appeared on the A-Channel on Canadian television. In 2001 he wrestled with the short-lived Western Canadian Extreme Wrestling promotion.

Devine wrestled dark matches for both Extreme Championship Wrestling and the World Wrestling Federation. While unable to wrestle due to nerve damage in his right shoulder, he operated his own promotion, Young Lions Wrestling.

=== Total Nonstop Action Wrestling (2004–2005) ===
In February 2004, Devine debuted in Total Nonstop Action Wrestling (TNA) as part of Team Canada, taking part in the TNA X Cup. He returned to TNA on May 26, 2004 along with Petey Williams, Bobby Roode and Eric Young, taking part in the TNA World X Cup, which pitted teams of wrestlers from Canada, Mexico, the United States and Japan against one another. On the July 9 edition of Impact, Team Canada (Eric Young, Johnny Devine and Bobby Roode) defeated Rod Steele and Bruce Steele and Frankie Capone, Team USA was victorious with six victories in the course of the night, with Team Canada in third place with three points. At Sacrifice, Devine competed in a World X Cup Gauntlet which was won by Petey Williams.

In June 2004, Team Canada began a lengthy feud with the 3Live Kru. On the August 11 edition of Impact, Team Canada (Eric Young and Johnny Devine) defeated 3-Live Krew (BG James and Konnan). On the August 25, 2004 edition of Impact, Team Canada (Scott D’Amore, Johnny Devine, and Eric Young) defeated 3Live Kru in a six-man tag match. On the August 27 edition of Impact, Team Canada (Williams, Roode, Young, and Devine) beat Rod and Bruce Steele, Mikey Batts, and Jerrelle Clark. On the September 1 edition of Impact, Team Canada (Young, Devine, and Roode) faced BG James, Konnan, and the Midnight Rider (Dusty Rhodes) in a six-man tag match in a losing effort. On the September 10 edition of Impact, Devine and Roode defeated Chris Harris and Elix Skipper. Following the September 26 edition of Impact, Devine and fellow TNA wrestler Andy Douglas were involved in an altercation after leaving Bar Nashville in Nashville, Tennessee. Devine was stabbed in the stomach, and his gallbladder and a foot of his lower intestine were removed as a result. He was sidelined for six weeks while recuperating, returning on December 5 at Turning Point 2004 in a surprise return where he helped Team Canada recapture the Tag Team titles. On the December 24 edition of Impact, Devine faced AJ Styles in a losing effort. On the January 28, 2005 edition of Impact, Devine faced Monty Brown in a losing effort. On the February 11, edition of Impact, Devine defeated Sonny Siaki.

=== Memphis Wrestling (2005) ===
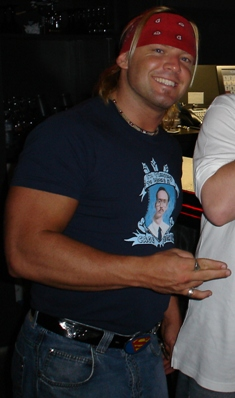
Devine in 2005

In March 2005, Devine was removed from in-ring competition once more after he tore his medial collateral ligament and anterior cruciate ligament while defending the Mid-Southern Tag Team Championships with Eric Young for Memphis Wrestling in Memphis, Tennessee. He underwent knee surgery on March 15, with a predicted recovery time of six months to a year. While injured, Devine worked as a trainer at Scott D'Amore's Can Am Wrestling School in Windsor, Ontario, as well as acting as an announcer for some promotions. He was replaced within Team Canada by A-1.

=== World Wrestling Entertainment (2005) ===
Devine returned to the ring in July 2005, wrestling occasionally for various Canadian independent promotions. On August 18, 2005, Devine appeared on an episode of World Wrestling Entertainment's SmackDown! as J.P. Parsons, teaming with Ruffy Silverstein and losing to Road Warrior Animal and Heidenreich in a squash match.

In October 2005, he returned to Winnipeg, Manitoba. Two weeks later, he announced that he required further surgery as a result of the stabbing thirteen months earlier, which had been improperly treated by doctors in Nashville, leaving him with several hernias. He underwent surgery to repair the hernias on January 27, 2006. Devine later relocated to Windsor, Ontario.

=== Return to TNA ===
==== Paparazzi Productions (2006) ====
Devine returned to TNA on the May 4, 2006 episode of TNA Impact!, teaming with Eric Young and subsequently losing to Shocker and Magno of Team Mexico in the first round of the 2006 World X Cup. At Sacrifice, Devine competed in a World X Cup Gauntlet which was won by Petey Williams.

On the June 29, 2006 episode of Impact!, Team Canada was disbanded by TNA Management Director Jim Cornette. On the same episode of Impact!, Devine joined Paparazzi Productions.

He was enlisted by Alex Shelley to be Paparazzi Production's production assistant, the two of them wearing Shelley's new "Eye Spy" T-shirt. They wrestled as a tag team on a special TNA Xplosion match and an Impact! non-title match versus then, NWA Tag Team champions A.J. Styles and Christopher Daniels. After Kevin Nash went out of action due to the injury, Alex Shelley and Johnny Devine continue to wrestle in both singles and tag-team action. On July 16, 2006, at Victory Road, Devine w/Alex Shelley defeated Shark Boy on the Pre-show. On the July 27 edition of Impact, Devine competed in a 4-way X-Division match which was won by Petey Williams. On the August 10 edition of Impact, Devine, Kevin Nash and Alex Shelley lost a six-man tag team match to Chris Sabin, Sonjay Dutt and Jay Lethal. At Hard Justice (2006), Devine faced Eric Young in a losing effort. On the August 17 edition of Impact, Devine teamed with Alex Shelley and Petey Williams faced the team of Chris Sabin, Sonjay Dutt and Jay Lethal in a losing effort. On the August 24 edition of Impact, The Paparazzi (Alex Shelley & Johnny Devine) defeated The Naturals. At No Surrender (2006), Shelley and Devine competed in Triple Chance tag team battle royal, which was won by The Naturals. On the September 28 edition of Impact, Devine teamed with Senshi and Alex Shelley in a losing effort against Chris Sabin, Sonjay Dutt and Jay Lethal. On the October 12 edition of Impact, Devine teamed with Senshi, Shelley and Petey Williams to face Chris Sabin, Jay Lethal, Sonjay Dutt and Sharkboy in a losing effort. At Bound for Glory 2006, Devine competed in the Kevin Nash Open Invitational X Division Gauntlet battle royal where he was eliminated by Austin Starr. On the November 2 edition of Impact, Devine was later fired from the Paparazzi by Kevin Nash. Devine was replaced, much to the dismay of Shelley, by former Generation Next teammate Austin Starr due to Kevin Nash's wishes. On the November 9 edition of Impact, Devine lost a 3-way match to Austin Starr.

==== Serotonin (2006 - 2007) ====
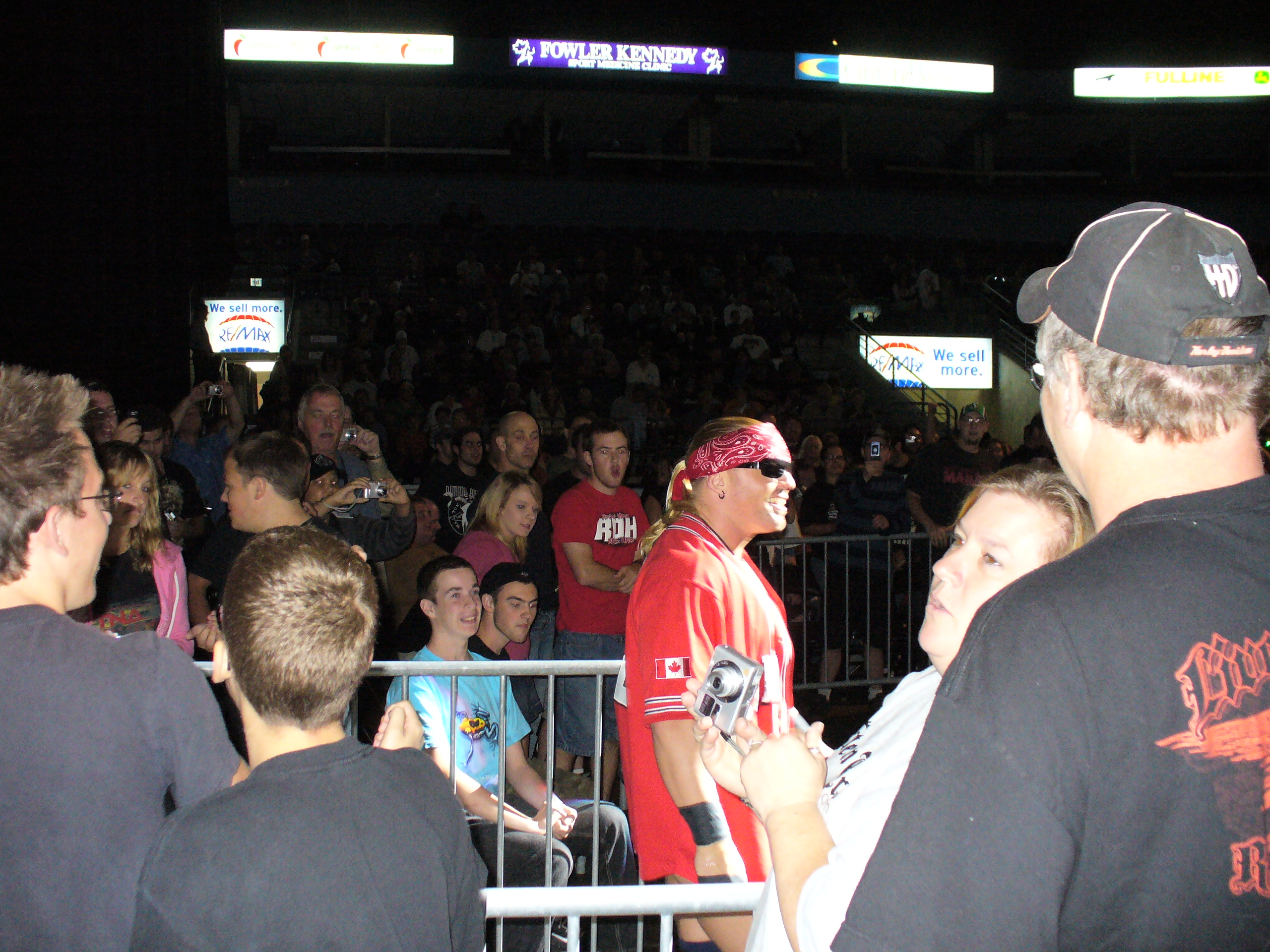
Devine in London in September 2008

Devine appeared with Matt Bentley and Frankie Kazarian at TNA's prime time premiere, the trio displaying an entirely different look. The three were soon dubbed Serotonin, a new version of Raven's Flock stable. As a member of the new group, Devine's name was changed to Havok. On the October 25 edition of Impact!, he participated in a fatal four way X Division style match against Williams, Sonjay Dutt and Shark Boy, but the match went to a no-contest after Team 3D interfered and put both Havok and Williams through tables. At TNA Genesis (2006), Devine & Kazarian, Maverick Matt lost to The Voodoo Kin Mafia. at TNA Against All Odds (2007) pre show, Serotonin (Kazarian and Havok) defeated Jay Lethal and Sonjay Dutt, At Lockdown, Serotonin (Havok and Kaz) lost to The Voodoo Kin Mafia (B.G. James and Kip James) in a Six Sides of Steel match. At No Surrender 2007, Serotonin (Raven and Havok) competed in a Ten-team tag team gauntlet match which was won by A.J. Styles and Tomko. At Bound for Glory (2007), Devine was in a Fight for the Right Reverse Battle Royal which was won by Eric Young. Following Kaz's turn, the release of Martyr (Bentley), and Raven's disappearance from television, the Havok gimmick still continued even with him on his own as a member of the X Division, including standing up for them against Team 3D. On the November 15 edition of Impact, Team 3D apparently took him hostage in order to get their demands met by the Motor City Machine Guns. The X Division rescued him and he went under the ring and grabbed a Kendo stick, then he suddenly attacked his fellow X Division stars, thus turning on the division and joining Team 3D on their quest to destroy it. This also effectively ended Serotonin once and for all, since within that segment, he'd ditched both the face paint and the brooding attitude associated with the group, although he continued wielding Serotonin's signature weapon, the Kendo stick.

==== X Division Champion and Team 3D (2007 - 2008) ====
The week after that he went back to being called Johnny Devine, with the new handle "The X-Division Traitor" attached, and became Team 3D's new interference runner, leading to Ray and Devon giving him the nickname "Brother Devine". This also began his signature catch phrase directed toward opponents, "you may be good, but you're not devine!".

On the November 15 edition of Impact, Team 3D took a mystery member of the X-Division hostage and made a list of demands. The entire X-Division came to his rescue but the hostage (Devine) was a traitor and helped Team 3-D destroy everyone. On the November 22 edition of Impact, Devine competed in a 3-way Turkey Bowl Qualifier which was won by Samoa Joe. At Turning Point, Johnny Devine and Team 3D defeated Jay Lethal and The Motor City Machine Guns in a Six Man Tag Team Tables match. On the November 27, 2007 edition of TNA Today, Devine defeated former Team Canada teammate Petey Williams after driving him to the mat with a double underhook piledriver. Devine was sporting new entrance music and attire as well and regained his cocky and obnoxious attitude. On the December 6 edition of Impact, Devine and Team 3D defeated Jay Lethal & Chris Sabin & Alex Shelley in a Ladder Match. On the December 13 edition of Impact, Devine faced "Black Machismo" Jay Lethal in a Lumberjack Strap match, which he lost. On the December 20 edition of Impact, Team 3-D and Devine faced Jay Lethal, Alex Shelley and Chris Sabin in a Double North Pole Match, which they lost. On the January 3, 2008 edition of Impact, Devine participated in a TNA X-Division Gauntlet Match, which was won by Petey Williams. At Final Resolution (January 2008), Devine and Team 3D defeated Jay Lethal and The Motor City Machine Guns in a Six-man tag team Ultimate X match. On the January 24, 2008 taping of TNA Impact, Devine defeated Jay Lethal to win the TNA X Division Championship after Brother Ray hit Lethal with a kendo stick. This was Devine's first title in TNA. On the February 7 edition of Impact, Devine faced Homicide where he lost by DQ. He lost the title to Lethal at Against All Odds after being pinned by Lethal in a six-man street fight which also included Team 3D and The Motor City Machine Guns. On the February 21 edition of Impact, Devine lost 3-way #1 Contenders match for a shot at the X Division title. On the March 27 edition of Impact, Devine defeated Alex Shelley in an X-Scape Qualifying match. At Lockdown (2008), Devine was a part of a Six Man Xscape match for the TNA X Division Championship, which was won by Jay Lethal. On the April 17 edition of Impact, Devine got an X-Division title shot but failed to win the title. At Sacrifice, Devine competed in a TerrorDome match to determine the number one contender to the TNA X Division Championship and take Kurt Angle's place in the main event; the match was won by Kaz. On the May 15 edition of Impact, Devine and The Rock & Rave Infection faced Kaz, Jay Lethal and Sonjay Dutt in a losing effort. On the June 5 edition of Impact, Devine competed in a King of the Mountain match, which was won by Kaz. On the July 24 edition of Impact, Devine competed in a Fatal 4 Way Match, which was won by Consequences Creed. On the July 31 edition of Impact, Devine teamed with Lance Rock and Jimmy Rave to face Jay Lethal, Curry Man and Shark Boy in a losing effort. On the August 14 edition of Impact, Devine faced Matt Morgan in a losing effort. On the September 4 edition of Impact, Devine faced Abyss in a Hardcore Match that ended in a No Contest. On the September 11 edition of Impact, Devine faced Samoa Joe in Match #1 of Kevin Nash's "Challenge" for Joe. On the September 18 edition of Impact, Devine teamed with Petey Williams and Jimmy Rave to face Super Eric, Shark Boy and Curry Man in a losing effort. At Bound for Glory, Devine competed in a Steel Asylum match (during which he botched his finishing move, resulting in the injury of Jimmy Rave), which was won by Jay Lethal; on the same night, he also interfered during the Monster's Ball match, helping Team 3D put Abyss through a flaming table.

Devine was released from TNA and left on October 13, 2008. Devine claimed he left because wrestling was "no longer fun" for him.

Devine returned for TNA One Night Only 10 Reunion on August 2, 2013 (taped March 17, 2013) where he competed in a Battle Royal which was won by Matt Morgan.

=== Independent circuit (2008-present) ===
After completing a program at Specs Howard School of Broadcast Arts, Devine moved from Windsor to Toronto, Ontario and was hired as an On Air Personality/Analyst for The Fight Network. He has also done some work for the Canadian Independent Promotion, BSE Pro. On January 18, 2013 Devine worked for the Hart Legacy promotion in Calgary, taking part in a six-man tag team match, where Devine, Bobby Lashley and Chris Masters were defeated by Lance Storm, Davey Boy Smith, Jr. and Lance Archer. On April 11, 2016, Devine competed on the second night of the two-night Vendetta Pro Wrestling event 'Casino Royale' in Las Vegas, Nevada. First, he won the Second Chance Battle Royal to get into the night's main event for the Cauliflower Alley Cup. Then, he defeated Tokyo Monster Kahagas (who won the Casino Royale Rumble on the first night) to become the first competitor to win the Cauliflower Alley Cup after winning the Second Chance Battle Royal. While holding the XICW Lightheavyweight Championship, Devine has defeated the likes of Tyson Dux and Cody Deaner for Border City Wrestling, Joey Ryan of Lucha Underground fame, and the one-legged wonder Zach Gowan.

== Championships and accomplishments ==
- Border City Wrestling
  - BCW Tag Team Championship (1 time) - with Jon Bolen
- Great Canadian Wrestling
  - GCW National Championship (1 time)
  - GCW Tag Team Championship (1 time) – with Michael Elgin
- Prairie Wrestling Alliance
  - PWA Hall of Fame - 2009
- Pro Wrestling Eclipse
  - PWE Television Championship (1 time, current)
- Pro Wrestling Illustrated
  - PWI ranked him #130 of the top 500 singles wrestlers in the PWI 500 in 2008
- Real Canadian Wrestling
  - RCW British Commonwealth Championship (1 time, current)
- Stampede Wrestling
  - Stampede British Commonwealth Mid-Heavyweight Championship (1 time)
  - Stampede International Tag Team Championship (1 time) – with Greg Pawluk
- Top Rope Championship Wrestling
  - TRCW Junior Heavyweight Championship (1 time)
  - TRCW Tag Team Championship (1 time) – with Rick Vain
- Total Nonstop Action Wrestling
  - TNA X Division Championship (1 time)
- Vendetta Pro Wrestling
  - 2016 Cauliflower Alley Cup
- Western Canadian Extreme Wrestling
  - WCEW Cruiserweight Championship (2 times)
- Xtreme Intense Championship Wrestling
  - XICW Light Heavyweight Championship (1 time)
