= BCW Can-Am Television Championship =

Professional wrestling championship

Details
- Promotion: Border City Wrestling
- Date established: June 23, 1995
- Current champion: Retired
- Date won: July 15, 2006
Statistics
- First champion: Otis Apollo
- Most reigns: Alex Shelley (2 times)
- Longest reign: The Brooklyn Brawler (1798 days)
- Shortest reign: N8 Mattson (<1 day)
- Youngest champion: Terry Richards (20 years, 10 months, 9 days)

The BCW Can-Am Television Championship was a second-tier title contested for in the Ontario-based professional wrestling promotion Border City Wrestling.

== Title history ==
Key
No.	Overall reign number
Reign	Reign number for the specific champion
Days	Number of days held

No.	Champion	Championship change			Reign statistics		Notes	Ref.
No.	Champion	Date	Event	Location	Reign	Days	Notes	Ref.
1	Otis Apollo	June 23, 1995	N/A	LaSalle, Ontario	1	420	Defeated Max Anthony to become the first champion.	
2	Terry Richards	August 16, 1996	BCW: Mickey Doyle Retirement Bash	LaSalle, Ontario	1	98		
—	Vacated	November 22, 1996	—	LaSalle, Ontario	—	—		
3	Professor Maxwell	November 24, 1996	N/A	Windsor, Ontario	1	N/A	Defeated Larry Brun to win the vacant title.	(Note: The exact length of Professor Maxwell's reign is unknown. It could have last between 40 and 70 days)
4	Larry Brun	January 1997	N/A	Windsor, Ontario	1	N/A		(Note: The exact length of Brun's reign is unknown. It could have last between 31 and 58 days)
5	Canadian Destroyer	February 1997	N/A	Windsor, Ontario	1	N/A		(Note: The exact length of Canadian Destroyers's reign is unknown. It could have last between 50 and 80 days)
6	Bo Lewis	March 22, 1997	N/A	Windsor, Ontario	1	7		
7	Gene Miller	March 29, 1997	N/A	Windsor, Ontario	1	84		
—	Vacated	June 21, 1997	—	—	—	—		
8	The Brooklyn Brawler	April 3, 1998	N/A	LaSalle, Ontario	1	1798	Defeated Bobby Clancy to win the vacant title.	
—	Vacated	March 6, 2003	—	Oldcastle, Ontario	—	—		
9	Chris Sabin	March 6, 2003	BCW March Breakdown	Oldcastle, Ontario	1	563	Defeated Frankie Kazarian and Jerry Lynn in a three-way match to win the vacant title.	
10	Alex Shelley	September 19, 2004	N/A	Windsor, Ontario	1	124		
11	Chris Sabin	January 21, 2005	BCW Doug Chevalier Memorial	Oldcastle, Ontario	2	86		
12	Petey Williams	April 17, 2005	BCW/PTW Re-Generation X	Belleville, Michigan	1	454	Defeated Sabin and Alex Shelley in a three-way match.	
13	N8 Mattson	July 15, 2006	WrestleFest 2006	Windsor, Ontario	1	<1	Defeated Petey Williams. This would be the last BCW event prior to their first hiatus.	
—	Deactivated	July 15, 2006	—	—	—	—	Vacated due to inactivity	

== Combined reigns ==
Rank	Champion	No. of reigns	Combined days
1	The Brooklyn Brawler	1	1798
2	Chris Sabin	2	549
3	Petey Williams	1	454
4	Otis Apollo	1	420
5	Alex Shelley	1	124
6	Terry Richards	1	98
7	Gene Miller	1	84
8	Canadian Destroyer	1	50¤
9	Professor Maxwell	1	40¤
10	Larry Brun	1	31¤
11	Bo Lewis	1	7
12	N8 Mattson	1	<1
