= TNA Genesis (2006) =

2006 Total Nonstop Action Wrestling pay-per-view event

Genesis (2006)
- DVD cover featuring Kurt Angle and Samoa Joe
- Promotion: Total Nonstop Action Wrestling
- Date: November 19, 2006
- City: Orlando, Florida
- Venue: Impact Zone
- Tagline: "The Revolution Will be Televised"

Pay-per-view chronology
← Previous; Bound for Glory	Next → Turning Point

Genesis chronology
← Previous; 2005	Next → 2007

The 2006 Genesis was a professional wrestling pay-per-view (PPV) event produced by Total Nonstop Action Wrestling (TNA), which took place on November 19, 2006 at the TNA Impact! Zone in Orlando, Florida. It was the second event under the Genesis chronology. Eight matches were featured on the event's card. The event was TNA’s highest-selling pay-per-view at the time, domestically selling just over 60,000 buys beating the previously set record of 55,000 at Bound for Glory (2006), and it is still TNA's best-selling pay-per-view outside of their annual pay-per-view events Bound for Glory and Slammiversary.

In October 2017, with the launch of the Global Wrestling Network, the event became available to stream on demand.

== Storylines ==
Genesis featured seven professional wrestling matches and two pre-show matches that involved different wrestlers from pre-existing scripted feuds and storylines. Wrestlers portrayed villains, heroes, or less distinguishable characters in the scripted events that built tension and culminated in a wrestling match or series of matches.

== Event ==
Prior to the start of the event there was a dark match between Robert Roode and Eric Young. At first Roode pinned Young using the ropes for leverage. The referee however ordered the match to restart once he realized that Roode had utilized the ropes. Young ultimately won the match, also utilizing the ropes for leverage.

The opening match of the pay-per-view was a 3-on-2 handicap match between Kazarian, Maverick Matt and Johnny Devine against The Voodoo Kin Mafia (B.G. James and Kip James). During the match, Kip hit Triple H's Pedigree and Shawn Michael's Sweet Chin Music. The Voodoo Kin Mafia ultimately picked up the victory after Kip hit the Cobra Clutch on Devine. After the match, Kip grabbed the mic and told Vince McMahon, Michael Hickenbottom and Paul Levesque to tune in on Thursday to Impact! to see what else they have in store.

The next match saw The Naturals (Andy Douglas and Chase Stevens) defeat Sonjay Dutt and Jay Lethal, after Shane Douglas interfered while the referee was distracted.

The TNA X Division Championship match was next, which saw the champion, Christopher Daniels, defending his title against Chris Sabin. During the match, Sabin threw a chair into the ring; however, A.J. Styles came out and grabbed the chair. Daniels later rolled up Sabin with an inside cradle to retain the title. After the match, Sabin grabbed a chair again, but was stopped by Jerry Lynn, demanding him and Daniels shake hands. Sabin shook Daniels' hand, and then hit him with a Cradle Shock.

The next match saw Ron Killings and Lance Hoyt defeat The Paparazzi (Austin Starr and Alex Shelley) when Hoyt rolled up Shelley, after he and Starr were distracted with their tripod.

The following match saw Christian Cage take on A.J. Styles. During the match, Christopher Daniels came out in order to take the chair away from Cage, which he was going to use. Styles attempted to use this distraction to hit Cage with a sunset flip, but Cage was able to block it and pin Styles for the victory. After the match, Styles and Daniels went at each other and were eventually broken up by Sonjay Dutt and Jay Lethal. Rhino came out and told Daniels and Styles to shake hands, but Styles refused, calling Rhino "Dr. Phil" before leaving ringside.

The NWA World Tag Team Championship match was next, which saw the champions The Latin American Exchange (Homicide and Hernandez with Konnan) take on America's Most Wanted (Chris Harris and James Storm). Before the match, Konnan stated that they would be utilizing their First Amendment right to burn the American flag. Before he was able to, America’s Most Wanted attacked them from behind, and the two teams went at each other to begin the match. LAX ultimately retained the title when Homicide hit Storm with a blow torch, enabling Hernandez to cover him and pick up the victory. After the match, LAX grabbed the flag to burn it again before Petey Williams came out with a pipe in order to chase LAX to the back. Jim Cornette came out and stated that TNA management has decided that due to LAX’s actions, they will be stripped of the titles, and they have until Impact! on Thursday to hand over the titles to him.

The second to last match was for the NWA World Heavyweight Championship. The champion Sting would defend his title against the challenger Abyss. Toward the end of the match, Sting laid out a bag of thumb tacks, and is choke-slammed onto the tacks. Sting then put Abyss into the Scorpion Deathlock, and Abyss tapped, but with James Mitchell distracting the referee. Sting then ties Abyss’ leg up, hangs him upside down and proceeds to beat him with a chair. When the referee attempts to break them up, Sting clotheslines the referee and gets disqualified. Under TNA rules (unlike most other major promotions) the title changes hands via a disqualification, meaning Abyss was the new champion, and is awarded the belt by Mitchell while lying unconscious on the ramp.

The main event saw Kurt Angle take on Samoa Joe. Ultimately, Angle picked up the victory when Joe tapped out of the ankle lock. With Angle's win, Joe suffered his first loss in 18 months (via pinfall or submission; Samoa Joe had previously lost matches in TNA up until this point in time, but had never been pinned or submitted in those matches). After the match, Joe stated that Angle was the better man tonight and requested a rematch. Joe stuck his hand out to shake Angle's hand, but Angle ignored his request and left the ring.

== Results ==
No.	Results	Stipulations	Times
1^{D}	Eric Young defeated Robert Roode (with Ms. Brooks)	Singles match	4:00
2	The Voodoo Kin Mafia (B.G. James and Kip James) defeated Kazarian, Maverick Matt and Johnny Devine	Handicap match	3:39
3	The Naturals (Andy Douglas and Chase Stevens) (with Shane Douglas) defeated Sonjay Dutt and Jay Lethal (with Jerry Lynn)	Tag team match	8:20
4	Christopher Daniels (c) defeated Chris Sabin	Singles match for the TNA X Division Championship	13:26
5	Ron Killings and Lance Hoyt defeated The Paparazzi (Austin Starr and Alex Shelley) (with Kevin Nash)	Tag team match	11:07
6	Christian Cage defeated A.J. Styles	Singles match	15:50
7	The Latin American Exchange (Homicide and Hernandez) (c) (with Konnan) defeated America's Most Wanted (Chris Harris and James Storm) (with Gail Kim)	Tag team match for the NWA World Tag Team Championship	9:20
8	Abyss (with James Mitchell) defeated Sting (c) via disqualification	Singles match for the NWA World Heavyweight Championship	15:10
9	Kurt Angle defeated Samoa Joe by submission	Singles match	13:35
(c) / – the champion(s) heading into the match; D / – this was a dark match
