= TNA Turning Point (2006) =

2006 Total Nonstop Action Wrestling pay-per-view event

Turning Point (2006)
- DVD cover featuring Kurt Angle
- Promotion: Total Nonstop Action Wrestling
- Date: December 10, 2006
- City: Orlando, Florida
- Venue: Impact Zone
- Tagline: "It's Damn Real"

Pay-per-view chronology
← Previous; Genesis	Next → Final Resolution

Turning Point chronology
← Previous; 2005	Next → 2007

The 2006 Turning Point was a professional wrestling pay-per-view (PPV) event produced by Total Nonstop Action Wrestling (TNA), which took place on December 10, 2006 at the Impact Zone in Orlando, Florida. It was the third event under the Turning Point chronology. Seven matches were featured on the event's card.

In October 2017, with the launch of the Global Wrestling Network, the event became available to stream on demand.

== Storylines ==
Turning Point featured professional wrestling matches that involve different wrestlers from pre-existing scripted feuds and storylines. Wrestlers portray villains, heroes, or less distinguishable characters in the scripted events that build tension and culminate in a wrestling match or series of matches.

== Event ==
Other on-screen personnel
Role:	Name:
Commentator	Mike Tenay
Commentator	Don West
Interviewer	Jeremy Borash
Ring announcer	Jeremy Borash
Ring announcer	David Penzer
Referee	Earl Hebner
Referee	Rudy Charles
Referee	Mark Johnson
Referee	Andrew Thomas

During a dark match before the start of the event, Lance Hoyt and Ron Killings defeated Serotonin (Maverick Matt, Kazarian and Havok) (with Raven) in a 3-on-2 Handicap tag team match.

The opening match of the pay-per-view was a Paparazzi Championship Series X Division 5-man elimination match. The five participants in the match were Senshi, Alex Shelley, Sonjay Dutt, Austin Starr and Jay Lethal. Dutt first eliminated Shelley via submission. Senshi next pinned Lethal following a running dropkick. Starr then eliminated Dutt after a brainbuster followed by a 450 splash. After Shelley distracted Starr while going for a 450 splash, Senshi was able to eliminate Starr to win the match.

Next was a bikini contest between Eric Young and Ms. Brooks. Young came out in a t-shirt with a bikini painted on it, to which Robert Roode, who came out with Brooks, grabbed the mic and demanded that Young be disqualified. Young in response removed the shirt to reveal he was wearing SpongeBob SquarePants boxers. The referee told Young he would be forced to disqualify him since they were not actually a bikini, to which Young removed his boxers to reveal a SpongeBob bikini. After Young was declared the winner, Roode threatened that if Brooks couldn’t get Young to join Robert Roode Inc., that she would be fired.

The next match was for the TNA X Division Championship with Special Guest Referee Jerry Lynn. Christopher Daniels successfully retain the title against Chris Sabin after he hit the Best Moonsault Ever. After the match, Lynn grabbed the mic and demanded both men shake hands. Daniels however stated that he didn’t need to, and when Lynn confronted him, Daniels slapped him.

Prior to the next match Jeremy Borash interviewed Rhino about his match with A.J. Styles. Styles interrupted the interview by attacking Rhino from behind, and the two brawled all the way to the ring. During the match Styles was thrown to the floor and acted as if he hurt his knee. Trainers came to the ring and began to help Styles, however with Rhino distracted Styles rolled back into the ring and rolled up Rhino for the win. After the match, Styles taunted Rhino showing that his knee was fine, and Rhino chased Styles to the back.

The following match saw The Latin American Exchange (Homicide and Hernandez) take on America's Most Wanted (Chris Harris and James Storm), in a Flag match. After Storm accidentally hit Harris in the face with a Beer bottle, Hernandez was able to hang the Mexican flag and pick up the win. Konnan grabbed the mic and told everyone to respect Mexico and they played the Mexican National Anthem. Borash in the back then interviewed Storm who stated that the loss was Harris’ fault and expected him to apologize to him and America on Thursday.

The second to last match was a Three-Way Dance for the NWA World Heavyweight Championship. Abyss was defending his title against Sting and Christian Cage. Abyss successfully retained his title after he hit the Black Hole Slam on Sting.

The main event saw Samoa Joe take on Kurt Angle. After the referee was knocked down, Angle attempted to hit Joe with a chair. Joe was able to move out of the way however, and the chair hit the top rope, bouncing back up and hitting Angle in the head. Joe utilized this opening to put Angle in the Coquina Clutch and pick up the victory via submission.

== Results ==
No.	Results	Stipulations	Times
1^{D}	Lance Hoyt and Ron Killings defeated Serotonin (Maverick Matt, Kazarian and Havok) (with Raven)	Handicap match	4:37
2	Senshi defeated Alex Shelley, Sonjay Dutt, Austin Starr and Jay Lethal	Paparazzi Championship Series X Division 5-man elimination match	14:37
3	Eric Young defeated Ms. Brooks (with Robert Roode)	Bikini contest	—
4	Christopher Daniels (c) defeated Chris Sabin	Singles match for TNA X Division Championship with Jerry Lynn as special guest referee	12:30
5	A.J. Styles defeated Rhino	Singles match	7:28
6	The Latin American Exchange (Homicide and Hernandez) (with Konnan) defeated America's Most Wanted (Chris Harris and James Storm) (with Gail Kim)	Flag match	10:45
7	Abyss (c) (with James Mitchell) defeated Sting and Christian Cage (with Tomko)	Three-Way Dance for the NWA World Heavyweight Championship	11:59
8	Samoa Joe defeated Kurt Angle by submission	Singles match	19:17
(c) / – the champion(s) heading into the match; D / – this was a dark match

Paparazzi Championship Series Points
Wrestler	Points
Senshi	5
Austin Starr	4
Sonjay Dutt	3
Jay Lethal	2
Alex Shelley	1
