= Chris Sabin =

American professional wrestler (born 1982)

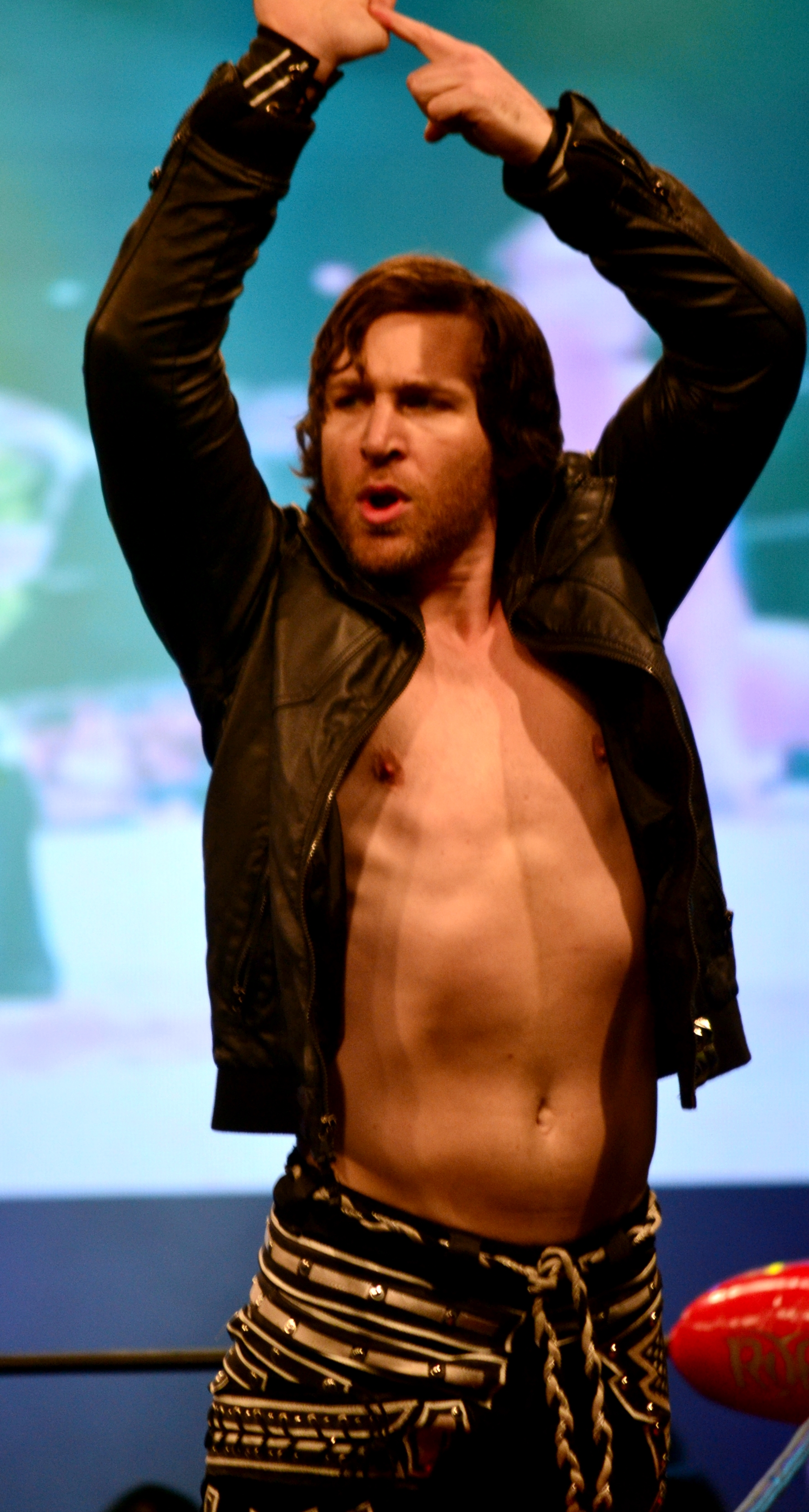
- Sabin in 2016

Personal information
- Born: Joshua Harter; February 4, 1982 (age 44) Pinckney, Michigan, U.S.

Professional wrestling career
- Ring name(s): Chris Sabin; Josh Green
- Billed height: 5 ft 10 in (178 cm)
- Billed weight: 205 lb (93 kg)
- Billed from: Detroit, Michigan
- Trained by: Scott D'Amore; Nate Mattson; Bobo Brown
- Debut: 2000

Joshua Harter (born February 4, 1982), better known by his ring name Chris Sabin, is an American professional wrestler and musician. He is signed to All Elite Wrestling (AEW), where he performs as one-half of the Motor City Machine Guns alongside Alex Shelley. In music, he is the bass guitarist of the rock band GRPPLNG.

After being trained by Scott D'Amore, Sabin debuted in 2000 for Border City Wrestling, and quickly began competing for numerous other independent promotions. In 2003, Sabin joined NWA: Total Nonstop Action (NWA-TNA), and quickly won the TNA X Division Championship, which he later unified with the WWA International Cruiserweight Championship. Throughout the next few years, Sabin competed mainly in TNA's X Division, until forming the Motor City Machine Guns with Shelley in mid-2007. Sabin won 14 total championships while with TNA, including one reign as TNA World Heavyweight Champion, a record 10 reigns as TNA X Division Champion, and three reigns as TNA World Tag Team Champion. Sabin is also known for his appearances with New Japan Pro-Wrestling, where he was a one-time IWGP Junior Heavyweight Tag Team Champion and one-time Strong Openweight Tag Team Champion, and Ring of Honor (ROH), where he was a one-time ROH World Tag Team Champion. Sabin, alongside Shelley, signed with WWE in 2024, and became former WWE Tag Team Champions before being released with Shelley in 2026. They signed with AEW that same year.

== Professional wrestling career ==
=== Training; early career (2000–2003) ===
Harter began training as a wrestler in Michigan at the NWA Great Lakes Pro wrestling school. After the school began experiencing difficulties, he travelled to Windsor, Ontario and completed his training under Scott D'Amore and "Amazing" N8 Mattson at the Can-Am Wrestling School. He debuted in 2000 after four months training as "Chris Sabin", and began working for D'Amore's Border City Wrestling promotion and for independent promotions in Michigan.

=== NWA Total Nonstop Action / Total Nonstop Action Wrestling (2003–2014) ===
==== X Division Champion (2003–2007) ====
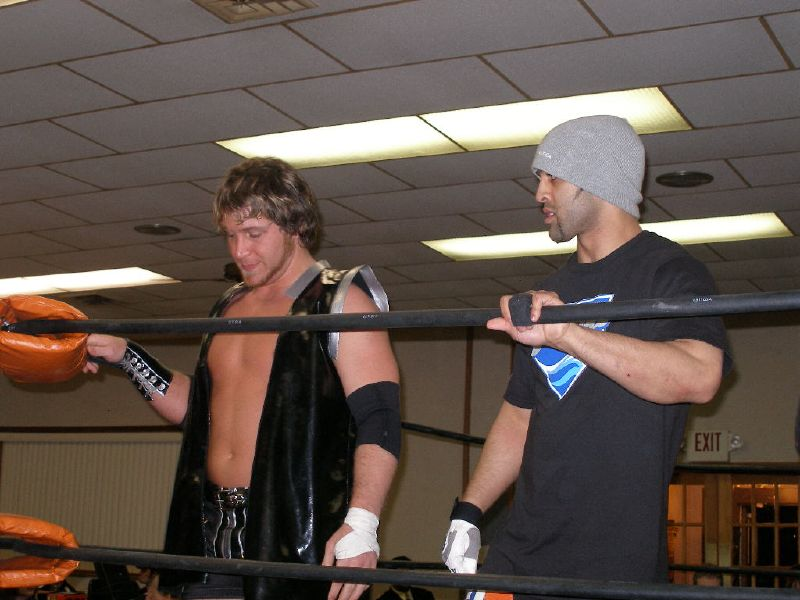
Sabin (left) and Sonjay Dutt (right) at a Chikara event in 2007

Sabin joined NWA Total Nonstop Action (TNA) in April 2003. He won the TNA X Division Championship on May 14 by defeating champion Amazing Red and Jerry Lynn in a three-way dance, after an assist from Triple X. After the match Sabin turned heel and joined Triple X in Sports Entertainment Xtreme. His reign ended after three months when he lost to Michael Shane in the first ever Ultimate X match on August 20.

On September 3, 2003, Sabin, now a face, won the TNA 2003 Super X Cup Tournament, thus becoming the number one contender to the X Division Championship. He regained the X Division Championship on January 7, 2004, defeating Shane, Christopher Daniels and Low Ki in the second Ultimate X match. He was stripped of the title on March 31, 2004, after a knee injury left him unable to defend it.

After returning from injury, Sabin took part in the TNA 2004 World X Cup Tournament in May 2004, forming Team TNA with Jerry Lynn, Christopher Daniels and Elix Skipper. On May 26, Team USA defeated Team Mexico, Team Canada and Team Japan in a two-hour pay-per-view event which saw the teams fight one another in a variety of matches. The finals saw Sabin wrestle the Canadian Petey Williams and the Mexican Héctor Garza in an Ultimate X match, which Sabin won when he retrieved a large red "X" which had been suspended above the ring on steel cables.

For the remainder of 2004, Sabin contended for the X Division Championship. He won another Ultimate X match on November 9 to win a title shot at Petey Williams. At Turning Point 2004 on December 5, however, Williams was able to secure a victory with the help of a pair of brass knuckles. Sabin got another shot at the title at Final Resolution on January 16, 2005, in an Ultimate X match with Williams and A.J. Styles, but the match and title were won by Styles.

Throughout 2005, Sabin feuded with Michael Shane, by now wrestling as Matt Bentley. In September 2005 he began a feud with Shocker that abruptly ended when Shocker was unable to return from Mexico for their scheduled match at Unbreakable on September 11. Instead, Sabin faced Petey Williams and won after hitting the Cradle Shock

In 2006, Sabin mostly teamed up with Sonjay Dutt, to great effect, beating Team Canada in a number one contenders tag team tournament on TNA Impact!. At the Against All Odds pay-per-view event Sabin and Dutt were beaten by Chris Harris and James Storm (America's Most Wanted) in a bout for the NWA World Tag Team Championships. On March 11, Chris Sabin defeated Alex Shelley and Sonjay Dutt in a 3-way match to represent both the US in the "International X Division Showcase" at Destination X 2006 as well as joining Jay Lethal on Team TNA in the upcoming World X Cup Tournament. Later that month, Sabin was hospitalized with a severe concussion after taking four blows to the head during a show for the Northeast Wrestling (NEW) promotion on March 25 in Bristol, Connecticut. He was released after undergoing a CAT scan. Sabin acted as the captain of Team USA at World X Cup 2006, defeating Puma of Team Mexico, earning 3 points, and on May 18, defeating Petey Williams in a sudden death tiebreaker singles match, winning the World X Cup for Team USA.

On the June 1, 2006 episode of TNA Impact!, Sabin rushed to the ring to clear out Alex Shelley and Kevin Nash, who were attacking Jay Lethal in another of Nash's X Division beatdowns. Nash would avoid a physical confrontation with Sabin, only to be challenged to a match by Sabin at Slammiversary 2006 which Nash was able to win.

Sabin later became the number one contender for the TNA X Division Championship by defeating Alex Shelley at Hard Justice 2006. Sabin would enter into an angle with fellow X-Division wrestlers to promote the Jackass: Number Two movie by imitating stunts performed on the film to display the lighter side of the X-Division, something then champion Senshi disapproved of. Since then, Sabin would attempt to take Senshi's title on several occasions. On October 22, 2006, Sabin defeated Senshi after using an inside cradle to become a 3 time X Division Champion at Bound for Glory 2006. On the November 2, 2006 episode of TNA Impact!, he lost the title to A.J. Styles in the Fight for the Right tournament.

Prior to the match, Sabin showed signs of turning heel when he expressed his disdain for X-Division pioneer, and face, Jerry Lynn for doubting his focus in an interview with Christy Hemme. Sabin completed his heel turn two weeks later when he refused to help fellow X-Division star Sonjay Dutt from an assault from Samoa Joe. Sabin went on to challenge Christopher Daniels at Genesis for the X Division Championship but failed. After winning a three-way match against former allies Sonjay Dutt and Jay Lethal for a number one contender's match, he once again challenged Daniels at Turning Point but lost.

At Final Resolution 2007, Sabin won the X Division Championship from then champion Christopher Daniels in a three-way match which also involved Jerry Lynn. Sabin went on to feud with Lynn over the title; defeating him at Against All Odds 2007 by using the ring ropes for leverage. At Destination X, Sabin defeated Lynn in a two out of three falls match to retain the X Division Championship. After the match, however, a masked man, who was later revealed to be Christopher Daniels, attacked both Sabin and Lynn. At Lockdown Sabin retained his title against Alex Shelley, Sonjay Dutt, Jay Lethal, and Shark Boy in a Six Sides of Steel Xscape match. At Sacrifice he retained his title against Sonjay Dutt, and Jay Lethal, by pinning Dutt. Sabin lost his title at Slammiversary, however, to Lethal. Sabin received a rematch on Impact! against Lethal and Samoa Joe, but Sabin was pinned after Joe hit a Muscle Buster.

==== Motor City Machine Guns (2007–2012) ====
Sabin (right) and Alex Shelley as the Motor City Machine Guns in 2010

In the summer of 2007, Sabin formed a tag team with Alex Shelley, known as the Motor City Machine Guns. The two had been teaming in several independent promotions prior to their formation as a team in TNA. Sabin and Shelley started a feud with Team 3D, turning face, which stemmed from Team 3D constantly attacking the X Division every week. They defeated Team 3D at Genesis. Motor City Machine Guns later competed in TNA's World X Cup as a part of Team USA/TNA and went undefeated, winning two tag team matches and the 12 man elimination tag team match.

Sabin and Shelley turned heel when, after a match with B.G. James and Eric Young, Sabin slapped James in the face. Sabin and Shelley lost a TNA World Tag Team Championship match at Turning Point to Beer Money, Inc.

Sabin and Shelley turned face then joined the TNA Frontline. In December 2008, Sabin qualified for the finals in the X Division title tournament after defeating Sonjay Dutt and Kiyoshi. On January 11, 2009, at Genesis, Sabin was defeated by his tag team partner Alex Shelley for the X Division title. Sabin and Shelley then floated began competing in minor matches. The two eventually began popping up in the crowd with various signs, such as "Yes, we still work here." They would then be given their own broadcast table and would occasionally do commentary for various matches. On the October 22 episode of Impact!, Sabin and Shelley won an Ultimate X match against Lethal Consequences to become the number one contenders for the TNA World Tag Team Championship. On the October 29 episode of Impact!, Sabin suffered a concussion during a match with Team 3D after landing on his head. At Turning Point, The British Invasion (Doug Williams and Brutus Magnus) defeated Sabin and Shelley and Beer Money, Inc. in a three-way match to retain the TNA Tag Team titles. The following month at Final Resolution, British Invasion defeated Sabin and Shelley to once again retain their titles.

At Destination X, Sabin and Shelley defeated Generation Me (Jeremy Buck and Max Buck) in an Ultimate X match to earn another shot at the TNA World Tag Team Championship. Sabin and Shelley received their title shot on the April 12 episode of Impact!, but were defeated by World Tag Team Champion Matt Morgan and Amazing Red, who replaced the injured Hernandez in the match. The following month at Sacrifice, the Motor City Machine Guns defeated Beer Money, Inc. and Team 3D in a three-way match to earn another shot at the Tag Team Championship. On July 11 at Victory Road, the Motor City Machine Guns defeated Beer Money, Inc. to win the vacant TNA World Tag Team Championship for the first time.

After Victory Road, the Motor City Machine Guns entered a Best of Five Series with Beer Money, Inc. for the TNA World Tag Team Championship. Beer Money won the first two matches, a ladder match and a Street Fight, after knocking out Sabin and Shelley with beer bottles. However, Sabin and Shelley came back to win the two following matches, a steel cage match and an Ultimate X match, to even the score to 2–2 and set up a deciding match for the August 12 episode of Impact!. On the August 12 episode of Impact! the Motor City Machine Guns defeated Beer Money, Inc. in a Two Out of Three Falls match to win the Best of Five Series and retain the TNA World Tag Team Championship.

At both No Surrender and Bound for Glory, the Motor City Machine Guns retained their titles in matches against Generation Me, who turned heel at the former event. Also at Bound for Glory, Team 3D announced their retirement from professional wrestling, but requested one final match against the Motor City Machine Guns, whom they called the best tag team in wrestling. The Motor City Machine Guns accepted and the match took place on November 7, 2010, at Turning Point, where they defeated Team 3D to retain the TNA World Tag Team Championship. Sabin also became one of only 2 people to kick out of the Dudley's 3D finisher, along with Masato Tanaka.

After Jeremy Buck pinned Sabin in an eight-person tag team match, where the Motor City Machine Guns teamed with Jay Lethal and Velvet Sky and Generation Me with Robbie E and Cookie, on the November 18 episode of Impact!, the Motor City Machine Guns challenged Generation Me to an Empty Arena match. The match took place later that same night on Reaction with the Motor City Machine Guns coming out victorious. On December 5 at Final Resolution the Motor City Machine Guns defeated Generation Me in a Full Metal Mayhem match to retain the World Tag Team Championship. The following month at Genesis, Sabin and Shelley lost the World Tag Team Championship to Beer Money, Inc., after Robert Roode rolled up Sabin following a miscommunication between the Machine Guns. Sabin and Shelley received their rematch for the title on the following episode of Impact!, but lost again due to a miscommunication. For the next three months, the Motor City Machine Guns went inactive, as Shelley suffered a collarbone injury and Sabin returned to the X Division.

On the April 28 episode of Impact!, Shelley made his return, saving Sabin from a beatdown at the hands of Mexican America (Anarquia and Hernandez). Ironically, the same day Shelley made his return, Sabin suffered a knee injury in his match with Anarquia. Sabin underwent surgery on his right knee in early May. On the June 2 episode of Impact Wrestling, Shelley announced that Sabin had torn his ACL and MCL and would be out for the rest of 2011.

On March 18, 2012, at Victory Road, TNA started promoting the returns of Sabin and the Motor City Machine Guns. On March 27, TNA president Dixie Carter announced that Sabin had been cleared to return to the ring. Sabin returned on the April 5 episode of Impact Wrestling, where he and Shelley defeated Mexican America in a tag team match, before announcing their intention of going for the TNA World Tag Team Championship, held by Magnus and Samoa Joe. On April 15 at Lockdown, The Motor City Machine Guns unsuccessfully challenged Magnus and Joe for the TNA World Tag Team Championship in a steel cage match. On May 21, it was reported that Shelley had left TNA, disbanding the Motor City Machine Guns.

==== TNA World Heavyweight Champion (2012–2013) ====
Sabin made his first appearance since Shelley's departure from TNA on the live May 31 episode of Impact Wrestling, unsuccessfully challenging Austin Aries for the X Division Championship. On the June 14 episode of Impact Wrestling, Sabin unsuccessfully challenged Aries for the X Division Championship in an Ultimate X match, which also included Zema Ion, during which Sabin appeared to injure his left knee. The following day, it was announced that Sabin had torn his left ACL during the match. On the July 5 episode of Impact Wrestling, Sabin returned to talk about his injury, but was interrupted and eventually attacked by TNA World Heavyweight Champion Bobby Roode. Sabin underwent surgery on his ACL the following day.

Sabin returned to Impact Wrestling on May 2, 2013, defeating Sonjay Dutt and Zema Ion in a number one contender's match for the X Division Championship. Sabin received his title shot on the May 16 episode of Impact Wrestling, but was defeated by defending champion Kenny King in a three-way match, also involving Petey Williams. On June 2 at Slammiversary XI, Sabin defeated King and Suicide in an Ultimate X match to win his fifth X Division Championship. Afterwards, Hulk Hogan came out and announced to Sabin that sometime during the summer he may trade in the X Division title for a World Heavyweight Championship match. On the June 27 episode of Impact Wrestling, he lost the X Division title to an impostor Suicide (who was later revealed to be Austin Aries) in a three-way match, which also included Kenny King, but defeated Aries and the newly christened Manik the following week, to regain the title for a record-tying sixth time. On the July 11 episode of Impact Wrestling, Sabin vacated the title in exchange for a shot at the TNA World Heavyweight Championship. The following week, Sabin defeated Bully Ray on the Destination X episode of Impact Wrestling, to win the World Heavyweight Championship, making him TNA's sixth Triple Crown Champion in the process. However, Sabin thought it was too soon to give him the title. On August 15 at Hardcore Justice, Sabin lost the World Heavyweight Championship back to Ray in his first title defense, contested inside a steel cage, following interference from Mr. Anderson and Tito Ortiz.

==== X Division Champion (2013–2014) ====
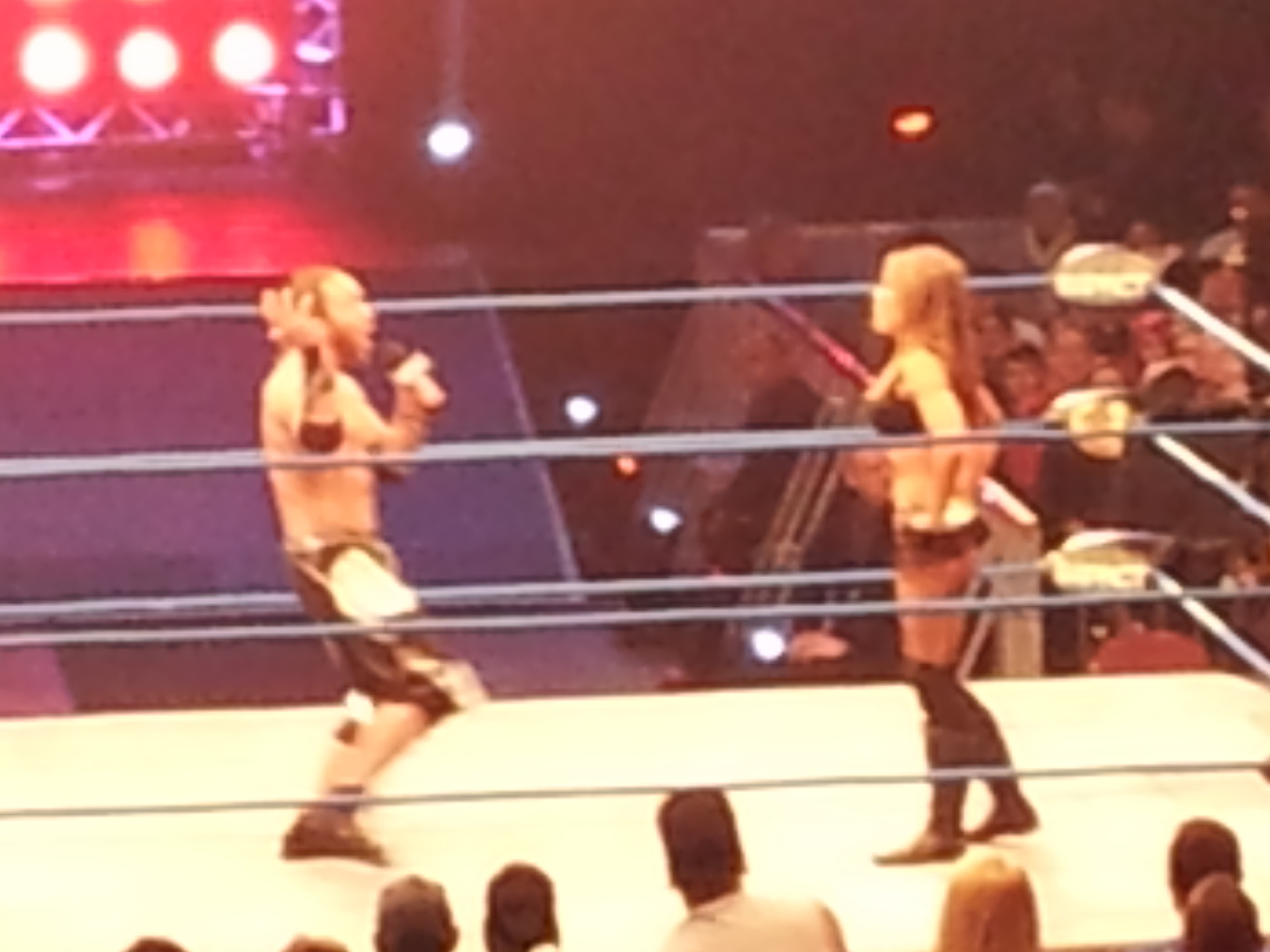
In 2014, Sabin had a feud with his real life girlfriend Velvet Sky.

On the September 19 episode of Impact Wrestling, Sabin turned heel after he attacked X Division Champion Manik after a match before being chased off by Jeff Hardy. The following week, Sabin unsuccessfully challenged Manik for his title. On October 20 at Bound for Glory, Sabin defeated Austin Aries, Jeff Hardy, Manik, and Samoa Joe in an Ultimate X Match to win the X Division Championship for a record-breaking seventh time.

Sabin lost the X Division title to Austin Aries at the November 23, 2013 Impact Wrestling tapings (airing December 12), but then won it back in a rematch at the December 5, 2013 tapings (airing January 2, 2014) for his record-breaking eighth reign. However, he lost the title against Aries on TNA Impact Wrestling:Genesis, on January 16, 2014, after Velvet Sky turned on him. During the TNA Maximum Impact tour, Sabin attacked Sky, aligned himself with Alpha Female. Then, he disappeared from TV until May 9, 2014, when his departure from the promotion was confirmed.

=== Ring of Honor (2003–2005) ===
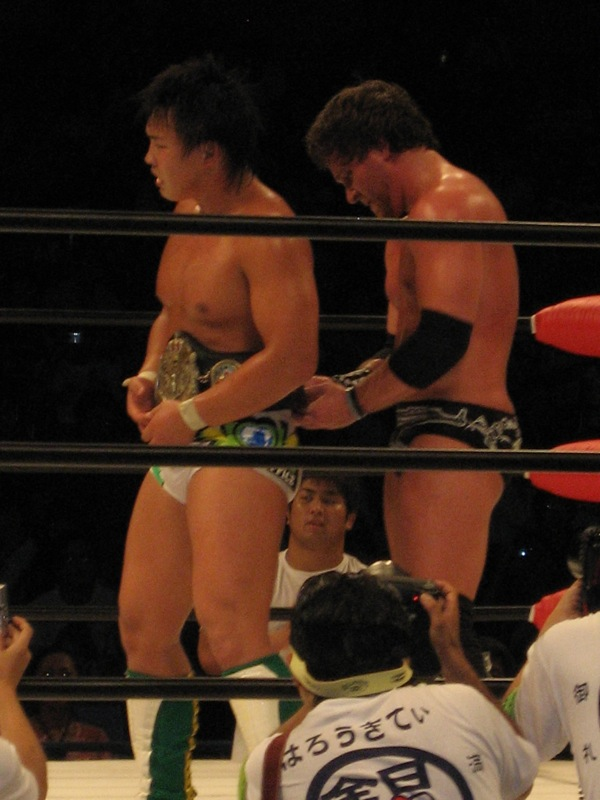
Sabin (right) fastening the World Junior Heavyweight Championship belt around the waist of Katsuhiko Nakajima, after Nakajima had defeated Sabin to retain it in August 2007

Sabin made his debut for Ring of Honor on June 14, 2003, in a four-way match, won by Homicide. He would wrestle for the company sporadically before leaving in February 2004. He would return on November 4, 2005, to unsuccessfully challenge Bryan Danielson for the ROH World Championship.

=== Pro Wrestling Zero1-Max (2006–2008) ===
On August 25, 2006, at Korauken Hall's ZERO-1 MAX show, Sabin and Alex Shelley became ZERO-1 MAX International Lightweight Tag Team Champions by defeating Ikuto Hidaka and Minoru Fujita. They held the titles for nearly two years, before dropping them to Minoru Fujita, and his new tag team partner, Takuya Sugawara, on April 6, 2008.

=== Return to ROH (2007–2008) ===
He returned to ROH along with tag team partner Alex Shelley on March 30, 2007, following the Briscoe Brothers winning the ROH World Tag Team Championship. The two challenged Jay Briscoe for a shot at the title on April 28 in Chicago, then attacked him after he accepted. The two would ultimately lose the match and leave the company. They also worked for Pro Wrestling Guerrilla, and challenged for the PWG World Tag Team Championship, although they never won.

In April 2008 Sabin and Shelley returned to ROH, losing to The Age of the Fall (Jimmy Jacobs and Tyler Black) and defeating the Briscoe Brothers (Jay and Mark) on the 18 and 19 respectively. In August 2008 Sabin and Shelley once again returned to ROH, wrestling Austin Aries and Bryan Danielson to a 25-minute time limit draw and losing to Kevin Steen and El Generico on the 1st and 2nd respectively. They were scheduled to return to ROH on October 24 and 25, but were pulled from the events by TNA and replaced by The Latin American Xchange.

=== New Japan Pro-Wrestling (2009–2010) ===
On January 4, 2009, Sabin and Shelley defeated No Limit (Tetsuya Naito and Yujiro) at New Japan Pro-Wrestling's Wrestle Kingdom III to win the IWGP Junior Heavyweight Tag Team Championship. After three successful title defenses, two of which took place in TNA, Sabin and Shelley lost the IWGP Junior Heavyweight Tag Team Titles to Apollo 55 (Prince Devitt and Ryusuke Taguchi) on July 5, 2009, at New Japan Pro-Wrestling's Circuit 2009 New Japan Soul. On November 8, 2010, New Japan Pro-Wrestling announced that the Motor City Machine Guns would be returning to the promotion the following month, competing at events on December 11 and 12. On December 11 the Motor City Machine Guns were defeated by No Limit in their New Japan return match. The following day they defeated Apollo 55 in the fourth match between the two teams.

=== Second return to ROH (2010, 2015–2019) ===
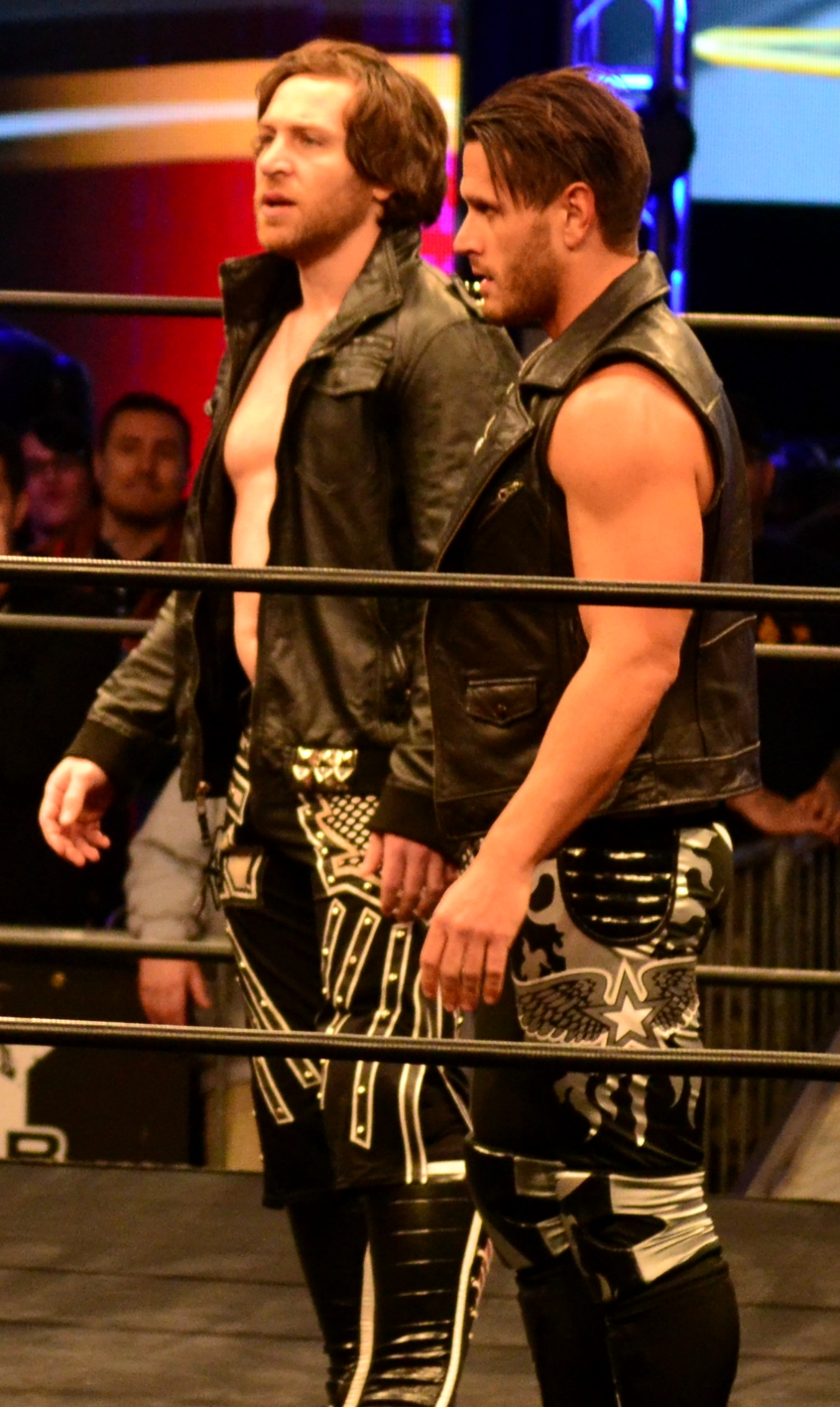
Sabin (left) and Alex Shelley in February 2016

On February 13, 2010, Ring of Honor announced at their 8th Anniversary Show that the Motor City Machine Guns would return to the company on May 8 in New York City. On May 8 the Motor City Machine Guns were defeated by the ROH World Tag Team Champions The Kings of Wrestling (Chris Hero and Claudio Castagnoli) via disqualification, when the Briscoe Brothers interfered in the match.

Sabin returned to Ring of Honor in early 2015. On the April 25 episode of Ring of Honor Wrestling, Sabin was revealed to be a member of the Knights of the Rising Dawn, a group that had been interfering in championship matches. He helped The Addiction (Christopher Daniels and Frankie Kazarian) defeat reDRagon to become the new ROH World Tag Team Champions. On the May 9 episode of Ring of Honor Wrestling, Sabin made his in-ring return to ROH in a match against Kyle O'Reilly. Sabin won the match with help from both Daniels and Kazarian.

In February 2016, at the 14th Anniversary Show, Sabin turned on Daniels and Kazarian, re-forming the Motor City Machine Guns with Alex Shelley. At the following day's Ring of Honor Wrestling tapings, Sabin and Shelley defeated Daniels and Kazarian in their return match. Sabin and Shelley then formed a stable named "Search and Destroy" with Jay White, Jonathan Gresham, and Lio Rush. On September 22, 2017, at Death Before Dishonor XV, The Motor City Machine Guns defeated the Young Bucks to win the ROH World Tag Team Championship for the first time. They would retain the titles until March 9, 2018, when they lost them against The Briscoe Brothers at ROH 16th Anniversary Show. In June, Shelley suffered an injury. On July 20, 2018, Shelley announced he would be leaving the promotion and retired from active competition, disbanding the tag team.

In August 2018, Sabin defeated Silas Young to become the number one contender for the ROH World Television Championship. At Death Before Dishonor XVI, Sabin unsuccessfully challenged Punishment Martinez for the championship. During the January 12, 2019 ROH television tapings, Sabin suffered a fully torn ACL during a six-man tag team match, with a forecast recovering time of eight to twelve months. He left ROH in March 2019.

=== Return to NJPW (2015–2016, 2018) ===
In May 2015, Sabin faced KUSHIDA and Kyle O'Reilly in a three way match as part of the ROH/NJPW Global Wars '15 event. In May 2016, they teamed with KUSHIDA and Matt Sydal in a loss to Bullet Club at Global Wars '16. In August 2016, the Motor City Machine Guns returned to Japan, unsuccessfully challenging the Young Bucks for the IWGP Junior Heavyweight Tag Team Championship.

In May 2018, it was announced that Sabin would participate in the 2018 Best of the Super Juniors tournament, he finalized the tournament with 3 wins and four losses, failing to advance to the finals. In October 2018, it was announced that Sabin would participate in the 2018 Super Junior Tag League 2018, teaming with Kushida. The team ended with three wins and four losses, failing to advance to the finals.

=== Return to Impact Wrestling/TNA Wrestling (2019–2024) ===
On March 21, 2019, Sabin returned to Impact Wrestling to work as a producer while he recovered from an anterior cruciate ligament injury. At Slammiversary, Sabin made his in-ring return from injury where he teamed with Alex Shelley to reform the Motor City Machine Guns, defeating The Rascalz after answering their open challenge. On the following episode of Impact, they defeated The North to capture the Impact World Tag Team Titles for a second time, ending their 383 days reign. Over the next few months, they would retain their titles against The Rascalz and Ace Austin and Madman Fulton. At Bound for Glory, The Guns lost their titles back to The North in a four-way tag team match also involving The Good Brothers (Doc Gallows and Karl Anderson), and Austin and Fulton, ending their reign at 97 days. Before the match, Shelley was attacked by The North, leaving Sabin to defend the titles by himself.

Following Bound for Glory, Sabin started teaming with James Storm for the next two months, defeating XXXL (Acey Romero and Larry D) at Turning Point on November 14. Sabin and Shelley would reunite on the December 1 episode of Impact!, resuming the team with another victory over XXXL, The Guns were scheduled to team up with Rich Swann to face Kenny Omega and The Good Brothers at Hard To Kill on January 16, 2021, but Shelley was replaced by Moose.

On the March 10, 2022 episode of Impact!, Sabin would reunite with Shelley in his feud with Jay White, leading to a match scheduled against White and Chris Bey on the March 17 episode. On December 9, 2022 episode of Impact!, The Guns defeated Heath and Rhino to capture the Impact World Tag Team Championship for a third time, ending their 62 days reign. On the March 2, 2023 episode of Impact, The Motor City Machine Guns lost their titles to Bullet Club members Ace Austin and Chris Bey, ending their reign at 78 days. On the April 20 episode of Impact!, Sabin, Shelley and Kushida defeated Jonathan Gresham, Mike Bailey and Impact X Division Champion Trey Miguel, where Sabin pinned Miguel to win. On May 1, Impact confirmed that Sabin will be getting a title match against Miguel at Under Siege. On May 26 at Under Siege, Sabin unsuccessfully challenged Miguel for the X Division Championship after getting blinded by spray paint away while the referee's back was turned. However, Sabin defeated Miguel at Against All Odds to win his ninth X Division Championship, breaking his own record again. On June 29 episode of Impact, Sabin successfully defended his title in his first title defense against Miguel via disqualification after he was attacked by Zachary Wentz.

On July 15 at Slammiversary, Sabin lost the X Division Championship to Lio Rush, ending his reign at 36 days. At the tapings of Impact 1000 on September 9, Sabin defeated Rush to win his tenth X Division Championship. On September 28 episode of Impact, Sabin successfully defended his title in his first title defense against Alan Angels. On October 21 at Bound for Glory, Sabin successfully defended the X Division Championship against Kenta. On December 9 at Final Resolution, Sabin and Shelley were defeated by Josh Alexander and Zack Sabre Jr. in a tag team match. On January 13, 2024 at Hard To Kill, Sabin retained the TNA X Division Championship against Kushida and AAA Mega Champion El Hijo del Vikingo. On February 23 at No Surrender, Sabin lost the TNA X Division Championship in the main event to Mustafa Ali, ending his reign at 167 days. On the March 23, 2024 tapings for TNA Impact!, Sabin, alongside Shelley, wrestled his final matches for TNA in a losing effort against The System (Eddie Edwards and Brian Myers, as both Shelley and Sabin's contracts expired on April 1, 2024.

=== Second return to NJPW (2022–2023) ===
After defeating the Strong Openweight Tag Team Champions, Aussie Open on the September 15th episode of Impact!, Sabin and Shelley made their return to New Japan Pro-Wrestling at Rumble on 44th Street on October 28. At the event, the duo defeated Aussie Open to win the Strong Openweight Tag Team Championships, in a three-way match, also involving The DKC and Kevin Knight. The duo retained the titles in February at Battle in the Valley, defeating the West Coast Wrecking Crew (Royce Isaacs and Jorel Nelson). On April 15 at Capital Collision, the duo lost the titles back to Aussie Open in a three-way tag-team match also involving the team of Kazuchika Okada and Hiroshi Tanahashi. At Destruction In Ryōgoku, the duo teamed with Josh Alexander to unsuccessfully challeng Kazuchika Okada, Hiroshi Tanahashi, and Tomohiro Ishii for the NEVER Openweight 6-Man Tag Team Championship.

=== All Elite Wrestling (2022) ===
On the August 24, 2022, episode of AEW Dynamite, Sonjay Dutt announced that Jay Lethal would team with the Motor City Machine Guns at the All Out PPV, where they would take on Wardlow and FTR in a six-man tag-team match, with Sabin and Shelley set to make their All Elite Wrestling (AEW) debut. At the event, Wardlow and FTR would win the match, with assistance from Samoa Joe, who attacked Satnam Singh early in the match.

=== WWE (2024–2026) ===
In September 2024, it was reported that Sabin and Alex Shelley had signed with WWE. They made their debut on the SmackDown brand on October 18. One week later, they won the WWE Tag Team Championship by defeating The Bloodline. On the November 15 episode of SmackDown, Sabin and Shelley defended the titles against The Street Profits (Angelo Dawkins and Montez Ford), but the match ended in a no contest after Ciampa attacked both teams. On the December 6 episode of SmackDown, Sabin and Shelley lost the titles to DIY after Gargano hit Sabin with a low blow, ending their reign at 42 days.

They attempted to regain the titles in a two-out-of-three falls match on February 1, 2025 at the Royal Rumble event, but were not successful due to interference from The Street Profits. On the April 25 episode of SmackDown, they would attempt to regain the titles in a tables, ladders, and chairs match, where the Street Profits won. At night two of SummerSlam on August 3, Sabin and Shelley competed in a six-pack tag team TLC match for the WWE Tag Team Championships against Fraxiom (Axiom & Nathan Frazer) Street Profits, Andrade & Rey Fénix, #DIY, and The Wyatt Sicks (Joe Gacy & Dexter Lumis), where the latter retained their titles.

Sabin and Shelley wrestled their final match in WWE on the April 17, 2026 episode of SmackDown as they both entered the André the Giant Memorial Battle Royal, but failed to win. A week later, it was reported that Sabin and Shelley were both released by WWE.

=== Return to AEW (2026–present) ===
Sabin and Shelley returned to AEW as signed talents during the opening of the July 30, 2026, episode of Collision, held in their hometown of Detroit. The appearance marked the duo's first time in the company in four years, following a one-off appearance in 2022. They wrestled their first match as AEW talents on the September 5 episode of Collision, defeating The Swirl (Blake Christian and Lee Johnson). In October, they began a best-of-five series against FTR (Cash Wheeler and Dax Harwood), with Sabin and Shelley winning the first match at WrestleDream on October 17. The two teams would trade victories for the second, third, and fourth matches which would tie the series at 2-2. Sabin and Shelley won the deciding match on the November 11 episode of Dynamite and became the number one contenders for the AEW World Tag Team Championship.

== Other media ==
Harter, as Chris Sabin, has appeared in the video games TNA IMPACT!, TNA Impact!: Cross the Line, TNA Wrestling Impact!, and made his debut in the WWE video game franchise in WWE 2K25, and was later included in WWE 2K26.

In 2008, Sabin, along with Alex Shelley, appeared in an episode of MTV MADE, teaching a student the basics of professional wrestling.

== Personal life ==
Harter was inspired by Hulk Hogan and Bret Hart. Before becoming a professional wrestler, he worked at Subway, and used his earnings to pay to attend a wrestling school, but also took classes at a community college.

Harter plays bass in a band called The High Crusade, which also includes Petey Williams and Alex Shelley, and their friends Adam Tatro and Chris Plumb. The band released their debut album, It's Not What You Think, on September 7, 2010. He is currently a bass guitarist for a rock band called GRPPLNG, which also includes Shelley.

An avid gamer, Harter's ring name is derived from the Final Fantasy VI (originally released in North America as Final Fantasy III) character Sabin Rene Figaro.

== Championships and accomplishments ==
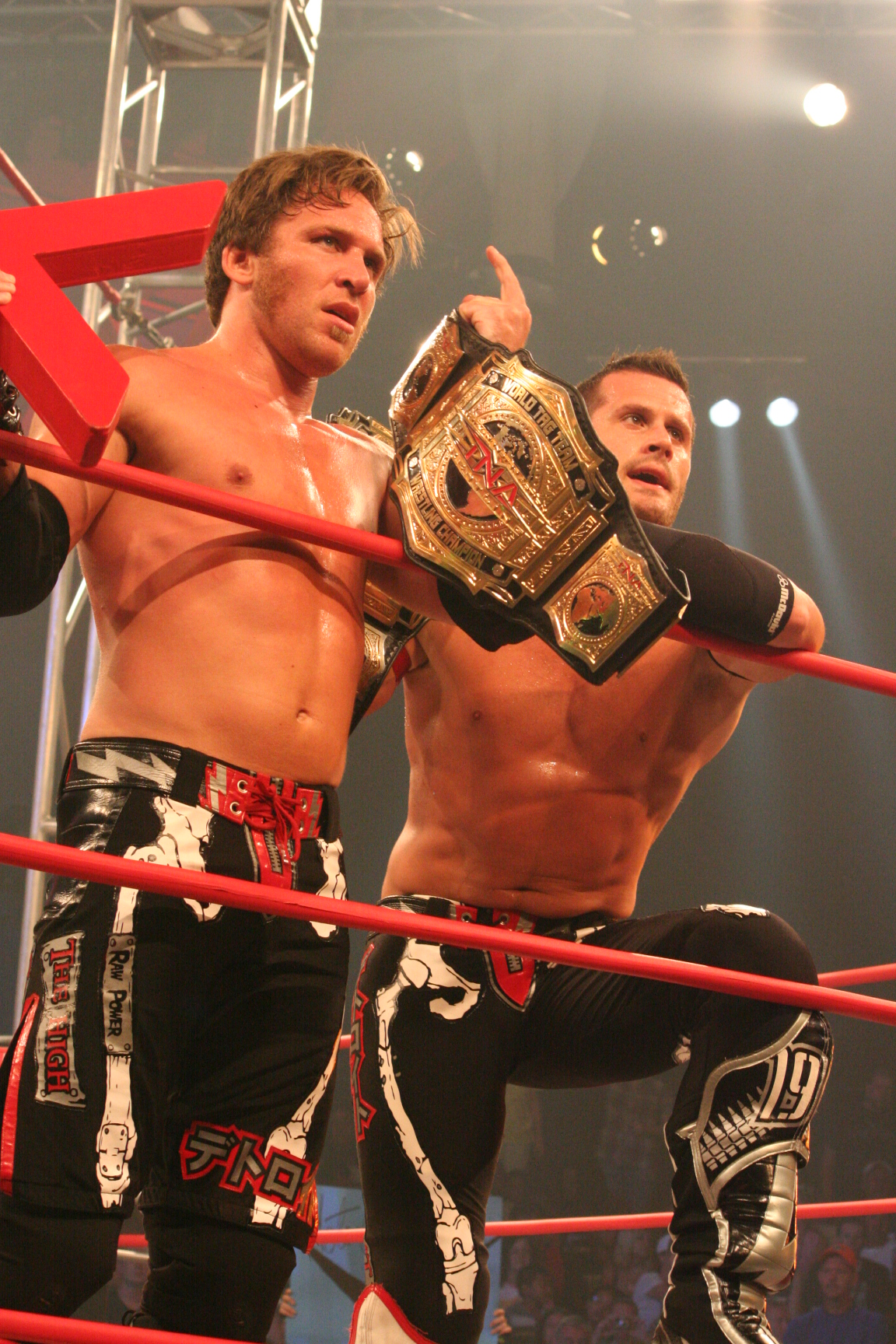
Sabin and Alex Shelley are three-time TNA/Impact World Tag Team Champions.

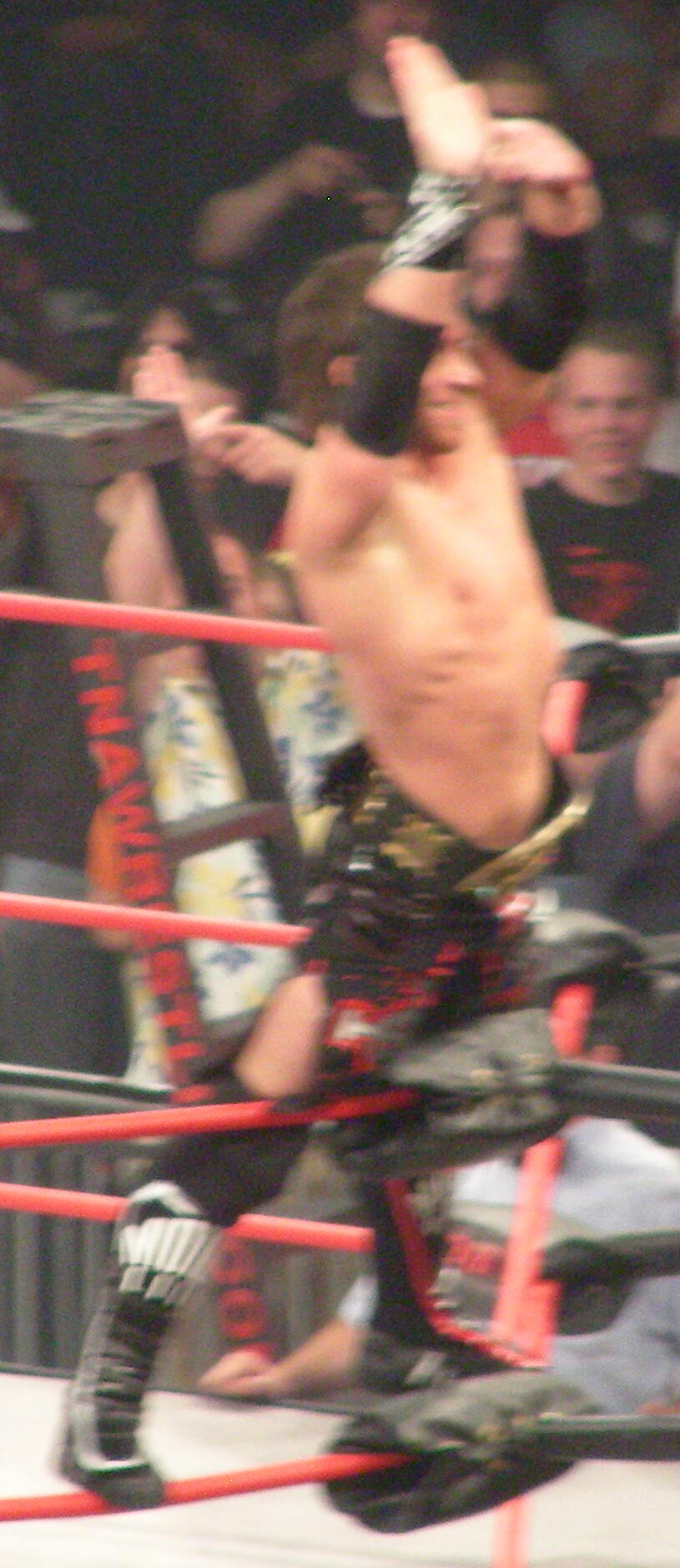
Sabin is a former IWGP Junior Heavyweight Tag Team Champion.

- All American Wrestling
  - AAW Tag Team Championship (1 time) – with Alex Shelley
- All Japan Pro Wrestling
  - AJPW Junior League (2007)
- The Baltimore Sun
  - Tag Team of the Year (2010) – with Alex Shelley
- Blue Water Championship Wrestling
  - BWCW Cruiserweight Championship (1 time)
- Border City Wrestling
  - BCW Can-Am Television Championship (2 times)
  - Pro Wrestler of the Year (2007)
- City Championship Wrestling
  - CCW Tag Team Championship (1 time) – with Alex Shelley
- Deadlock Pro-Wrestling
  - DPW Worlds Tag Team Championship (1 time) – with Alex Shelley
- Discovery Wrestling
  - Y Division Championship (1 time)
  - Y Division Title Tournament (2015)
- Game Changer Wrestling
  - GCW Tag Team Championship (1 time) – with Alex Shelley
- Great Lakes All-Pro Wrestling
  - GLAPW Junior Heavyweight Championship (1 time)
- International Wrestling Cartel
  - IWC Super Indy Championship (1 time)
  - Super Indy Tournament (2004)
- Maryland Championship Wrestling
  - MCW Cruiserweight Championship (2 times)
- Maximum Pro Wrestling
  - MXPW Cruiserweight Championship (2 times)
  - MXPW Television Championship (1 time)
- Michigan Marquee Wrestling Association
  - MMWA Marquee Heavyweight Championship (1 time)
- New Japan Pro-Wrestling
  - IWGP Junior Heavyweight Tag Team Championship (1 time) – with Alex Shelley
  - Strong Openweight Tag Team Championship (1 time) – with Alex Shelley
- NWA Florida
  - Jeff Peterson Memorial Cup (2005)
- NWA Great Lakes
  - NWA Great Lakes Heavyweight Championship (1 time)
- Pro Wrestling Illustrated
  - PWI Tag Team of the Year (2010) – with Alex Shelley
  - Ranked No. 28 of the top 500 singles wrestlers in the PWI 500 in 2007
- Pro Wrestling Zero1
  - NWA International Lightweight Tag Team Championship (1 time) – with Alex Shelley
- Ring of Honor
  - ROH World Tag Team Championship (1 time) – with Alex Shelley
- Total Nonstop Action Wrestling/Impact Wrestling/NWA Total Nonstop Action
  - TNA World Heavyweight Championship (1 time)
  - TNA/Impact X Division Championship (10 times)
  - Impact/TNA World Tag Team Championship (3 times) – with Alex Shelley
  - TNA 2003 Super X Cup Tournament
  - TNA 2004 World X Cup Tournament – with Jerry Lynn, Elix Skipper, and Christopher Daniels
  - TNA 2006 World X Cup Tournament – with Alex Shelley, Jay Lethal, and Sonjay Dutt
  - TNA Gauntlet for the Gold (2008 – Tag Team) – with Alex Shelley
  - Sixth Triple Crown Champion
  - Impact/TNA Year End Awards (5 times)
    - Match of the Year (2003) vs. Frankie Kazarian and Michael Shane on August 20
    - Memorable Moment of the Year (2003) The first Ultimate X match
    - Tag Team of the Year (2007) with Alex Shelley
    - Moment of the Year (2020) – Motor City Machine Guns' return to Impact at Slammiversary, shared with the other returns and debuts that night
    - Men's Tag Team of the Year (2022) with Alex Shelly
- Twin City Wrestling
  - TCW Heavyweight Championship (1 time)
- Ultimate Championship Wrestling
  - UCW Lightweight Championship (1 time)
- World Wrestling All-Stars
  - WWA International Cruiserweight Championship (1 time)
- WWE
  - WWE Tag Team Championship (1 time) – with Alex Shelley
  - WWE Tag Team Championship #1 Contender Tournament (2024) – with Alex Shelley
  - WWE Tag Team Championship #1 Contender Tournament (2025) – with Alex Shelley
- Xtreme Intense Championship Wrestling
  - XICW Light Heavyweight Championship (1 time)
  - XICW Tag Team Championship (1 time) – with Truth Martini
- Wrestling Observer Newsletter
  - Rookie of the Year (2003)
  - Worst Worked Match of the Year (2006) TNA Reverse Battle Royal on TNA Impact!
