= TNA Wrestling Home Video =

TNA Home Video
- Company type: Subsidiary
- Founded: 2005
- Headquarters: Toronto, Ontario, Canada
- Products: DVDs, VHS
- Parent: Total Nonstop Action Wrestling
- Website: www.tnamerch.com

TNA Home Video is a division of Total Nonstop Action Wrestling (TNA) that releases its pay-per-view (PPV) events, documentaries and other TNA produced compilations on physical mediums via its official website.

== History ==
Prior to TNA Home Video, the promotion did not have a distribution partner and self-published six DVDs exclusively through their website between 2003 and 2004.

In June 2005, TNA announced an agreement with the Navarre Corporation to distribute home videos for the United States and Canada. Navarre released TNA's monthly PPV events and various compilations to major retailers.

In March 2012, it was announced that the Navarre Corporation had left the DVD distribution business to focus on other business interests, and that TNA was looking for a new distribution partner. Though, would ultimately revert to self-publishing via their official website.

In November 2021, the promotion announced they would release that year's Slammiversary in the VHS format as a collector's item.

=== United Kingdom and Germany ===
In October 2006, Pinnacle Vision announced that they had acquired the license to release TNA DVDs in the United Kingdom. The UK license later changed to Lace International. In January 2013, Queensway Digital announced it had acquired TNA's UK and German licenses. In December 2013, it was announced Queensway Digital had entered administration, with the final UK and German DVD release eventually being One Night Only: World Cup 2014.

=== Australia and New Zealand ===
Between 2009 and 2011, Madman Entertainment held the license to produce TNA DVDs in Australia and New Zealand.

== Pay-per-view releases ==
=== 2004 ===
- Victory Road 2004
- Turning Point 2004

=== 2005 ===
- Final Resolution 2005
- Against All Odds 2005
- Destination X 2005
- TNA Lockdown 2005
- Hard Justice 2005
- Slammiversary 2005
- No Surrender 2005
- Sacrifice 2005
- Unbreakable 2005
- Bound for Glory 2005
- Genesis 2005
- Turning Point 2005

=== 2006 ===
- Final Resolution 2006
- Against All Odds 2006
- Destination X 2006
- TNA Lockdown 2006
- Sacrifice 2006
- Slammiversary 2006
- Victory Road 2006
- Hard Justice 2006
- No Surrender 2006
- Bound for Glory 2006
- Genesis 2006
- Turning Point 2006

=== 2007 ===
- Final Resolution 2007
- TNA Against All Odds (2007)
- Destination X 2007
- TNA Lockdown 2007
- Sacrifice 2007
- Slammiversary 2007
- Victory Road 2007
- Hard Justice 2007
- No Surrender 2007
- Bound for Glory 2007
- Genesis 2007
- Turning Point 2007

=== 2008 ===
- Final Resolution (January) 2008
- Against All Odds 2008
- Destination X 2008
- Lockdown 2008
- Sacrifice 2008
- Slammiversary 2008
- Victory Road 2008
- Hard Justice 2008
- No Surrender 2008
- Bound for Glory IV
- Turning Point 2008
- Final Resolution (December) 2008

=== 2009 ===
- Genesis 2009
- Against All Odds 2009
- Destination X 2009
- Lockdown 2009
- Sacrifice 2009
- Slammiversary 2009
- Victory Road 2009
- Hard Justice 2009
- No Surrender 2009
- Bound for Glory 2009
- Turning Point 2009
- Final Resolution 2009

=== 2010 ===
- Genesis 2010
- Against All Odds 2010
- Destination X 2010
- Lockdown 2010
- Sacrifice 2010
- Slammiversary 2010
- Victory Road 2010
- Hardcore Justice 2010
- No Surrender 2010
- Bound for Glory 2010
- Turning Point 2010
- Final Resolution 2010

=== 2011 ===
- Genesis 2011
- Against All Odds 2011
- Victory Road 2011
- Lockdown 2011
- Sacrifice 2011
- Slammiversary IX
- Destination X 2011
- Hardcore Justice 2011
- No Surrender 2011
- Bound for Glory 2011
- Turning Point 2011
- Final Resolution 2011

=== 2012 ===
- Genesis 2012
- Against All Odds 2012
- Victory Road 2012
- Lockdown 2012
- Sacrifice 2012
- Slammiversary 2012
- Destination X 2012
- Hardcore Justice 2012
- No Surrender 2012
- Bound for Glory 2012
- Turning Point 2012
- Final Resolution 2012

=== 2013 ===
- Genesis 2013
- Lockdown 2013
- One Night Only: X-Travaganza
- One Night Only: Joker's Wild
- Slammiversary XI
- One Night Only: Hardcore Justice 2
- One Night Only: 10 Reunion
- One Night Only: Knockouts Knockdown
- Bound for Glory 2013
- One Night Only: Tournament of Champions
- One Night Only: World Cup of Wrestling

=== 2014 ===
- One Night Only: Tag Team Tournament
- One Night Only: #OLDSCHOOL
- Sacrifice 2014
- One Night Only: Joker's Wild 2
- Slammiversary 2014
- One Night Only: Global Impact Japan
- One Night Only: X-Travaganza 2014
- One Night Only: World Cup 2014
- Bound for Glory 2014
- One Night Only: Knockouts Knockdown 2014
- One Night Only: Victory Road

=== 2015 ===
- One Night Only: Turning Point
- One Night Only: Rivals
- One Night Only: Joker's Wild 2015
- One Night Only: Hardcore Justice 2015
- One Night Only: X-Travaganza 2015
- Slammiversary 2015
- One Night Only: World Cup 2015
- One Night Only: Gut Check
- Bound for Glory 2015
- One Night Only: USA vs. The World

=== 2016 ===
- One Night Only: Live! 2016
- One Night Only: Rivals 2016
- One Night Only: Joker's Wild 2016
- One Night Only: Knockouts Knockdown 2016
- One Night Only: Victory Road 2016
- Slammiversary 2016
- One Night Only: World Cup 2016
- One Night Only: X-Travaganza 2016
- One Night Only: September 2016
- Bound for Glory 2016
- One Night Only: Against All Odds 2016
- One Night Only: December 2016

=== 2017 ===
- One Night Only: Joker's Wild 2017
- One Night Only: Rivals 2017
- One Night Only: Victory Road – Knockouts Knockdown
- Slammiversary (2017)
- One Night Only: Turning Point 2017
- Bound for Glory (2017)
- One Night Only: No Surrender 2017

=== 2018 ===
- Redemption
- Slammiversary
- Bound for Glory

=== 2019 ===
- Homecoming
- Rebellion
- Slammiversary
- Bound for Glory

=== 2020 ===
- Hard To Kill (2020)
- Rebellion (2020)
- Slammiversary (2020)
- Bound for Glory (2020)

=== 2021 ===
- Hard To Kill (2021)
- Impact Wrestling Rebellion (2021)
- Slammiversary (2021) [DVD/VHS]
- Homecoming (2021)
- Bound for Glory (2021) [DVD/VHS]

=== 2022 ===
- Hard To Kill (2022)
- Rebellion (2022)
- Slammiversary (2022)
- Bound for Glory (2022)

=== 2023 ===
- Hard To Kill (2023)
- Rebellion (2023)
- Slammiversary (2023)
- Bound for Glory (2023)

=== 2024 ===
- Hard To Kill (2024)
- Rebellion (2024)
- Slammiversary (2024)
- Bound for Glory (2024)

2025

- Genesis (2025)
- Rebellion (2025)
- Slammiversary (2025) [2-disc DVD set, includes Fade to Black]

== Compilation releases ==
=== 2003 ===
- Best of NWA-TNA Title Matches
- Best of X-Division Matches
- Best of Bloodiest Brawls

=== 2004 ===
- The Ultimate X Collection
- The Best of America's Most Wanted
- The Best of 3Live Kru

=== 2005 ===
- October 4, 2005 – The Best of Raven: Nevermore
- October 4, 2005 – The Best of Jeff Hardy: Enigma
- October 4, 2005 – The Best of A.J. Styles: Phenomenal
- October 4, 2005 – The Best of the X Division Vol. 1

=== 2006 ===
- January 10, 2006 – The Best of Christopher Daniels: Heaven Sent, Hell Bound
- March 14, 2006 – The Best of the Bloodiest Brawls Vol. 1
- June 6, 2006 – The Best of Samoa Joe: Unstoppable
- August 29, 2006 – Knockouts: The Ladies Of TNA Wrestling Vol. 1
- October 10, 2006 – Sting: Return of an Icon
- October 31, 2006 – Best Of the X Division Vol. 2
- November 21, 2006 – The 50 Greatest Moments

=== 2007 ===
- March 13, 2007 – Best of the Tag Teams Vol. 1
- April 10, 2007 – Phenomenal: The Best of A.J. Styles Vol. 2
- July 31, 2007 – Doomsday: The Best of Abyss
- October 23, 2007 – Christian Cage: The Instant Classic
- November 20, 2007 – The History of TNA: Year 1

=== 2008 ===
- April 22, 2008 – Best of TNA 2007
- June 24, 2008 – Global Impact: Japan
- August 5, 2008 – Best of The Bloodiest Brawls: Scars and Stitches
- October 7, 2008 – Knocked Out: Pro Wrestling's Best Women's Division
- October 21, 2008 – Ultimate Matches
- November 25, 2008 – Kurt Angle: Champion

=== 2009 ===
- April 14, 2009 – Jeff Jarrett: King of the Mountain
- April 14, 2009 – World X-Cup 2008
- May 5, 2009 – Second 2 None: TNA's Toughest Tag Teams

=== 2010 ===
- February 16, 2010 – Best of TNA 2009
- May 25, 2010 – Fandimonium: Beer Money, Inc. & Motor City Machine Guns
- September 21, 2010 – Best of Asylum Years Vol. 1
- October 19, 2010 – Wrestling's Greatest Moments

=== 2011 ===
- April 19, 2011 – The Best of Mick Foley
- July 19, 2011 – Immortal Forever?
- October 18, 2011 – Enigma: The Best of Jeff Hardy Vol. 2

=== 2016 ===
- May 1, 2016 – Best of the Asylum Years Vol. 2
- The Essential AJ Styles Collection [4-disc DVD set]

2018

- The Essential Samoa Joe Collection
- The Essential Bobby Roode Collection
- The Essential Eric Young Collection
- The Essential Gail Kim Collection

2021

- The Essential RVD Collection
- The Essential Rhino Collection

2024

- May 7, 2024 – TNA Wrestling Presents: The Best of Drew Galloway
- May 7, 2024 – TNA Wrestling Presents: The Best of Eli Drake

== Box sets ==
- Best of the X Division Vol. 1 & Vol. 2 (Twin Pack)
- TNA Anthology: The Epic Set (Victory Road 2004, Turning Point 2004 & Lockdown 2005)
- TNA: Triple Threat (Hard Justice 2005, Slammiversary 2005 & No Surrender 2005)
- Cross the Line Vol. 1 (Victory Road 2008, Hard Justice 2008 & No Surrender 2008)
- Cross the Line Vol. 2 (Turning Point 2008, Final Resolution 2008 & Genesis 2009)
- Cross the Line Vol. 3 (Turning Point 2009, Final Resolution 2009 & Against All Odds 2010)
- Victory Road 2010 & No Surrender 2010 (Twin Pack Vol. 1)
- Turning Point 2010 & Final Resolution 2010 (Twin Pack Vol. 2)
- Against All Odds 2011 & Victory Road 2011 (Twin Pack Vol. 3)
- Sacrifice 2011 & Slammiversary 2011 (Twin Pack Vol. 4)
- Hardcore Justice 2011 & No Surrender 2011 (Twin Pack Vol. 5)
- Turning Point 2011 & Final Resolution 2011 (Twin Pack Vol. 6)
- Against All Odds 2012 & Victory Road 2012 (Twin Pack Vol. 7)

== See also ==
- WWE Home Video
