= One Night Only: Hardcore Justice 2 =

Hardcore Justice 2
- Promotion: Total Nonstop Action Wrestling
- Date: March 19, 2013 (aired July 5, 2013)
- City: Orlando, Florida
- Venue: Impact Zone at Universal Studios Florida
- Attendance: 1,400

Hardcore Justice chronology
| ← Previous; 2012 | Next → 2013 |

One Night Only chronology
| ← Previous; Joker's Wild | Next → 10 Reunion |

One Night Only: Hardcore Justice 2, also referred to as Hardcore Justice 2, was a professional wrestling pay-per-view event produced by Total Nonstop Action Wrestling (TNA) which took place on March 19, 2013 at the Impact Zone at Universal Studios Florida in Orlando, Florida and aired on tape delay on July 5, 2013 as a One Night Only-branded event.

== Production ==
=== Background ===
From 2005 to 2009, TNA presented the Hard Justice event as a live pay-per-view event as part of their monthly pay-per-view schedule. In 2010, the event was renamed to Hardcore Justice in honor of the defunct promotion Extreme Championship Wrestling (ECW) and featured notable ECW alumni such as Sabu, Mick Foley, Tommy Dreamer, Raven, Team 3D, Balls Mahoney, and Axl Rotten.

On January 11, 2013 Total Nonstop Action (TNA) President Dixie Carter announced that they would be discontinuing their monthly pay-per-view events which had been airing live since 2004 and shifted towards holding taped pay-per-view events under the special branding of One Night Only. February 6, 2013, TNA announced that they would be taping several One Night Only pay-per-view events throughout March at the Impact Zone at Universal Studios Florida.

=== Storylines ===
One Night Only: Hardcore Justice 2 featured professional wrestling matches that involves different wrestlers from pre-existing scripted feuds and storylines. Wrestlers portrayed villains, heroes, or less distinguishable characters in scripted events that built tension and culminated in a wrestling match or series of matches. Storylines were produced on Total Nonstop Action Wrestling's weekly shows Impact and Xplosion.

== Results ==
| No. | Results | Stipulations | Times |
|---|---|---|---|
| 1 | The Latin American Xchange (Homicide and Hernandez) defeated The Disciples of the New Church (Sinn and Slash) | Street Fight | 10:09 |
| 2 | ODB defeated Jackie Moore | Hardcore Knockouts match | 9:18 |
| 3 | Bad Influence (Christopher Daniels and Kazarian) defeated Generation Me (Jeremy Buck and Max Buck) | Ladder match for a $20,000 check | 13:31 |
| 4 | Shark Boy defeated Gunner, Crimson, Little Guido, Funaki, Sam Shaw, Johnny Swinger, 2 Cold Scorpio and Devon Storm | Hardcore Gauntlet Battle Royal | 19:24 |
| 5 | James Storm, Magnus and Bob Holly defeated Aces & Eights (D.O.C., Wes Brisco and Knux) | Six-Man Hardcore Elimination tag team match | 12:53 |
| 6 | Joseph Park defeated Judas Mesias (with James Mitchell) | Monster's Ball match | 12:20 |
| 7 | Jeff Hardy and Brother Runt defeated Team 3D (Bully Ray and Devon) | Tables match | 9:44 |

Hardcore gauntlet battle royal

| Draw | Entrant | Weapon | Order | Eliminated by | Time |
|---|---|---|---|---|---|
| 1 | Devon Storm | Golf Club | 3 | Gunner | 10:45 |
| 2 | Little Guido | Dust Pan | 2 | Funaki | 9:28 |
| 3 | Crimson | Umbrella | 7 | Shark Boy | 19:20 |
| 4 | Sam Shaw | Cane | 4 | 2 Cold Scorpio | 13:09 |
| 5 | Johnny Swinger | Crutch | 1 | Little Guido | 6:31 |
| 6 | Funaki | Guard Rail | 5 | 2 Cold Scorpio & Shark Boy | 16:11 |
| 7 | Gunner | Nightstick | 8 | Shark Boy | 19:24 |
| 8 | 2 Cold Scorpio | Broom | 6 | Crimson & Gunner | 16:58 |
| 9 | Shark Boy | Nurse Shark | — | Winner | 19:24 |

Six-man elimination tag team match

| Wrestler | Order | Eliminated by | Elimination move | Time |
|---|---|---|---|---|
| Knux | 1 | Bob Holly | Pinned after an Alabama Slam | 10:37 |
| Bob Holly | 2 | Wes Brisco | Pinned with a Schoolboy | 10:42 |
| Wes Brisco | 3 | Magnus | Pinned after being hit on the head with a trash can lid and a Magnus Driver | 10:55 |
| Magnus | 4 | D.O.C. | Pinned after a Chokeslam | 11:06 |
| D.O.C. | 5 | James Storm | Pinned after a Closing Time followed by a Last Call | 12:53 |
| James Storm | - | Winner | - | 12:53 |
