= TNA One Night Only (2013) =

Total Nonstop Action Wrestling's One Night Only events during 2013

TNA One Night Only (2013) is a series of professional wrestling One Night Only events held by Total Nonstop Action Wrestling (TNA) in 2013.

== X-Travaganza ==
X-Travaganza
- Promotion: Total Nonstop Action Wrestling
- Date: January 12, 2013 (aired April 5, 2013)
- City: Orlando, Florida
- Venue: Impact Zone
- Attendance: 1,400

One Night Only chronology
← Previous; First	Next → Joker's Wild

X-Travaganza chronology
← Previous; First	Next → 2014

One Night Only: X-Travaganza honored and paid tribute to the X-Division as the past, present, and future X-Division stars collided. As part of his retirement tour, this was Jerry Lynn's final match in TNA. It took place on January 12, 2013, from the Impact Zone in Orlando, Florida and aired on PPV on April 5, 2013.

No.	Results	Stipulations	Times
1	Christian York defeated Alex Silva, Jimmy Rave, Lince Dorado, Matt Bentley, Puma and Sam Shaw	Xscape match	16:01
2	Douglas Williams and Kid Kash defeated Rashad Cameron and Anthony Nese	Tag Team match	13:17
3	Chavo Guerrero defeated Robbie E	Singles match with Joseph Park as Special Guest Referee	5:10
4	Kenny King defeated Mason Andrews, Rubix and DJZ	Ultimate X match	15:23
5	Bad Influence (Christopher Daniels and Kazarian) defeated Petey Williams and Sonjay Dutt	Tag Team match	12:48
6	Rob Van Dam defeated Jerry Lynn	No Disqualification match	16:58
7	Austin Aries defeated Samoa Joe	Singles match	18:27

Xscape eliminations

Wrestler	Order	Eliminated by	Elimination move	Time
Lince Dorado	1	Christian York	Pinned after a Mood Swing	7:17
Puma	2	Sam Shaw	Pinned after an Inverted facelock backbreaker followed by a neckbreaker	8:00
Alex Silva	3	Matt Bentley	Pinned after an Inverted facelock backbreaker followed by a neckbreaker by Shaw	9:00
Sam Shaw	4	Jimmy Rave	Pinned after a The Move That Rocks the World	10:41
Matt Bentley	5	Christian York	Pinned after a Mood Swing	12:37
Jimmy Rave	6	Christian York	Failed to escape the cage	16:01
Christian York	—	Winner	Escaped the cage	16:01

== Joker's Wild ==
Joker's Wild
- Promotion: Total Nonstop Action Wrestling
- Date: January 12, 2013 (aired May 3, 2013)
- City: Orlando, Florida
- Venue: Impact Zone
- Attendance: 1,400

One Night Only chronology
← Previous; X-Travaganza	Next → Hardcore Justice 2

Joker's Wild chronology
← Previous; First	Next → 2014

One Night Only: Joker's Wild was made up of tag team matches in which the partners were randomly drawn in a lottery and teams had to work together to advance to the main event battle royal, with the grand prize of US$100,000. It took place on January 12, 2013, from the Impact Zone in Orlando, Florida and aired on PPV on May 3, 2013.

No.	Results	Stipulations	Times
1	Christian York and James Storm defeated Crimson and Gunner	Tag team match to qualify for the Gauntlet Battle Royal match later that night	8:39
2	Jessie Godderz and Mr. Anderson defeated Douglas Williams and Kid Kash	Tag team match to qualify for the Gauntlet Battle Royal match later that night	10:09
3	Christopher Daniels and Samoa Joe defeated Chavo Guerrero and Rob Van Dam	Tag team match to qualify for the Gauntlet Battle Royal match later that night	14:41
4	Bobby Roode and Joseph Park defeated Robbie E and DJZ	Tag team match to qualify for the Gauntlet Battle Royal match later that night	9:37
5	Aces & Eights (Devon and D.O.C.) defeated Alex Silva and Hernandez	Tag team match to qualify for the Gauntlet Battle Royal match later that night	11:46
6	Matt Morgan and Robbie T defeated Al Snow and Joey Ryan	Tag team match to qualify for the Gauntlet Battle Royal match later that night	10:10
7	James Storm won the $100,000 prize by last eliminating Bobby Roode	Joker's Wild gauntlet battle royal	24:02

Gauntlet battle royal

Draw	Entrant	Order	Eliminated by	Time
1	James Storm	—	Winner	24:00
2	Bobby Roode	11	James Storm	
3	Devon	10	James Storm	23:35
4	DOC	1	James Storm and Bobby Roode	5:59
5	Jessie Godderz	2	Joseph Park	12:52
6	Christian York	3	Robbie T	18:49
7	Joseph Park	6	Matt Morgan	21:32
8	Mr. Anderson	5	Robbie T	20:20
9	Christopher Daniels	4	Robbie T	19:08
10	Samoa Joe	7	Matt Morgan	21:53
11	Robbie T	8	Matt Morgan	22:11
12	Matt Morgan	9	James Storm	22:34

== Hardcore Justice 2 ==
Hardcore Justice 2
- Promotion: Total Nonstop Action Wrestling
- Date: March 19, 2013 (aired July 5, 2013)
- City: Orlando, Florida
- Venue: Impact Zone
- Attendance: 1,400

One Night Only chronology
← Previous; Joker's Wild	Next → 10 Reunion

One Night Only: Hardcore Justice 2 consisted of matches with various hardcore wrestling stipulations, and took place on March 19, 2013, from the Impact Zone in Orlando, Florida and aired on PPV on July 5, 2013.

No.	Results	Stipulations	Times
1	The Latin American Xchange (Homicide and Hernandez) defeated The Disciples of the New Church (Sinn and Slash)	Street Fight	10:09
2	ODB defeated Jackie Moore	Hardcore Knockouts match	9:18
3	Bad Influence (Christopher Daniels and Kazarian) defeated Generation Me (Jeremy Buck and Max Buck)	Ladder match for a $20,000 check	13:31
4	Shark Boy defeated Gunner, Crimson, Little Guido, Funaki, Sam Shaw, Johnny Swinger, 2 Cold Scorpio and Devon Storm	Hardcore Gauntlet Battle Royal	19:24
5	James Storm, Magnus and Bob Holly defeated Aces & Eights (D.O.C., Wes Brisco and Knux)	Six-Man Hardcore Elimination tag team match	12:53
6	Joseph Park defeated Judas Mesias (with James Mitchell)	Monster's Ball match	12:20
7	Jeff Hardy and Brother Runt defeated Team 3D (Bully Ray and Devon)	Tables match	9:44

Hardcore gauntlet battle royal

Draw	Entrant	Weapon	Order	Eliminated by	Time
1	Devon Storm	Golf Club	3	Gunner	10:45
2	Little Guido	Dust Pan	2	Funaki	9:28
3	Crimson	Umbrella	7	Shark Boy	19:20
4	Sam Shaw	Cane	4	2 Cold Scorpio	13:09
5	Johnny Swinger	Crutch	1	Little Guido	6:31
6	Funaki	Guard Rail	5	2 Cold Scorpio & Shark Boy	16:11
7	Gunner	Nightstick	8	Shark Boy	19:24
8	2 Cold Scorpio	Broom	6	Crimson & Gunner	16:58
9	Shark Boy	Nurse Shark	—	Winner	19:24

Six-man elimination tag team match

Wrestler	Order	Eliminated by	Elimination move	Time
Knux	1	Bob Holly	Pinned after an Alabama Slam	10:37
Bob Holly	2	Wes Brisco	Pinned with a Schoolboy	10:42
Wes Brisco	3	Magnus	Pinned after being hit on the head with a trash can lid and a Magnus Driver	10:55
Magnus	4	D.O.C.	Pinned after a Chokeslam	11:06
D.O.C.	5	James Storm	Pinned after a Closing Time followed by a Last Call	12:53
James Storm	-	Winner	-	12:53

== 10 Reunion ==
10 Reunion
- Promotion: Total Nonstop Action Wrestling
- Date: March 17, 2013 (aired August 2, 2013)
- City: Orlando, Florida
- Venue: Impact Zone
- Attendance: 1,400

One Night Only chronology
← Previous; Hardcore Justice 2	Next → Knockouts Knockdown

One Night Only: 10 Reunion included stars from the early years of TNA returning. TNA's greatest feuds and rivalries from the past, were reignited for one night only. It took place on March 17, 2013, from the Impact Zone in Orlando, Florida and aired on PPV on August 2, 2013.

No.	Results	Stipulations	Times
1	Kenny King defeated Petey Williams and Sonjay Dutt	Three-way match	12:52
2	Velvet Sky defeated Gail Kim	Singles match	5:28
3	Matt Morgan defeated Joseph Park, Johnny Devine, Shark Boy, Chase Stevens, Cassidy Riley, Robbie E, Jessie Godderz, Mr. Anderson and Johnny Swinger	Gauntlet match	22:03
4	Team 3D (Bully Ray and Devon) defeated The Latin American Xchange (Homicide and Hernandez) and Bad Influence (Christopher Daniels and Kazarian)	Three-way tag team match	12:37
5	Jeff Hardy defeated Austin Aries	Singles match	12:57
6	Bobby Roode defeated James Storm	Singles match	13:56
7	Kurt Angle defeated Samoa Joe	Singles match	12:17

Gauntlet battle royal

Draw	Entrant	Order	Eliminated by	Time
1	Johnny Devine	1	Shark Boy	1:47
2	Shark Boy	7	Matt Morgan	17:51
3	Chase Stevens	3	Matt Morgan	10:51
4	Cassidy Riley	2	Robbie E and Jessie Godderz	9:27
5	Robbie E	4	Matt Morgan	11:24
6	Jessie Godderz	5	Matt Morgan	11:37
7	Matt Morgan	—	Winner	22:03
8	Mr. Anderson	8	Joseph Park	19:01
9	Johnny Swinger	6	Mr. Anderson	17:33
10	Joseph Park	9	Pinned by Matt Morgan	22:03

== Knockouts Knockdown ==
Knockouts Knockdown
- Promotion: Total Nonstop Action Wrestling
- Date: March 17, 2013 (aired September 6, 2013)
- City: Orlando, Florida
- Venue: Impact Zone
- Attendance: 1,400

One Night Only chronology
← Previous; 10 Reunion	Next → Tournament of Champions

Knockouts Knockdown chronology
← Previous; First	Next → 2014

One Night Only: Knockouts Knockdown was a series of matches featuring various Knockouts and independent wrestlers. The winners of these matches would advance to a gauntlet battle royal, with the winner being crowned the "Queen of the Knockouts". It took place on March 17, 2013, from the Impact Zone in Orlando, Florida and aired on PPV on September 6, 2013.

No.	Results	Stipulations	Times
1	Gail Kim defeated Alissa Flash	Singles match	8:16
2	Lei'D Tapa defeated Ivelisse	Singles match	7:32
3	Tara defeated Mia Yim	Singles match	6:19
4	Miss Tessmacher defeated Santana	Singles match	4:19
5	ODB defeated Trinity	Singles match	6:13
6	Jackie Moore defeated Taryn Terrell	Singles match	5:05
7	Hannah Blossom defeated Sojo Bolt and Taeler Hendrix	Three-way match	4:53
8	Velvet Sky defeated Jillian Hall	Singles match	6:40
9	Mickie James defeated Serena	Singles match	10:55
10	Gail Kim defeated Hannah Blossom, Jackie Moore, Lei'D Tapa, Mickie James, Velvet Sky, Miss Tessmacher, ODB and Tara	Knockouts Gauntlet match to crown the "Queen of the Knockouts"	20:40

Gauntlet battle royal

Draw	Entrant	Order	Eliminated by	Time
1	Hannah Blossom	1	Gail Kim	1:29
2	Gail Kim	—	Winner	20:40
3	Lei'D Tapa	2	Gail Kim and Tara	7:25
4	Tara	7	Mickie James	18:24
5	Mickie James	8	Pinned by Gail Kim	20:40
6	Miss Tessmacher	6	Tara	17:32
7	Jackie Moore	3	ODB	13:52
8	ODB	4	Velvet Sky	16:43
9	Velvet Sky	5	Gail Kim	17:05

== Tournament of Champions ==
Tournament of Champions
- Promotion: Total Nonstop Action Wrestling
- Date: March 19, 2013 (aired November 1, 2013)
- City: Orlando, Florida
- Venue: Impact Zone
- Attendance: 1,400

One Night Only chronology
← Previous; Knockout Knockdown	Next → World Cup

One Night Only: Tournament of Champions included the top World Champions in TNA history battling to determine the greatest of all time. It took place on March 19, 2013, from the Impact Zone in Orlando, Florida and aired on PPV on November 1, 2013.

No.	Results	Stipulations	Times
1	James Storm defeated Mr. Anderson	Singles match	5:53
2	Samoa Joe defeated Jeff Hardy	Singles match	9:01
3	Austin Aries defeated Kurt Angle	Singles match	11:13
4	James Storm defeated Bully Ray via disqualification	Singles match	6:38
5	Bobby Roode defeated Sting via Submission	Singles match	7:06
6	Samoa Joe defeated Austin Aries	Singles match	8:58
7	Bobby Roode defeated James Storm via Submission	Singles match	9:19
8	Bobby Roode defeated Samoa Joe	Singles match	9:55

Tournament bracket

First round
James Storm	Pin
Mr. Anderson	5:53

Second round
James Storm	DQ
Bully Ray	6:38
Bobby Roode	Sub
Sting	7:06
Samoa Joe	Pin
Jeff Hardy	9:01
Austin Aries	Pin
Kurt Angle	11:13

Semifinals
James Storm	9:19
Bobby Roode	Sub
Samoa Joe	Pin
Austin Aries	8:58

Finals
Bobby Roode	Pin
Samoa Joe	9:55

== World Cup ==
World Cup
- Promotion: Total Nonstop Action Wrestling
- Date: March 18, 2013 (aired December 6, 2013)
- City: Orlando, Florida
- Venue: Impact Zone
- Attendance: 1,400

One Night Only chronology
← Previous; Tournament of Champions	Next → Tag Team Tournament

World Cup chronology
← Previous; First	Next → 2014

One Night Only: World Cup was an event which took teams of wrestlers from around the World and had them compete in Heavyweight, X Division, Tag Team and Knockouts Division matches to crown the TNA World Cup Champions. It took place on March 18, 2013, from the Impact Zone in Orlando, Florida and aired on PPV on December 6, 2013.

Teams and members

- Team USA
  - (United States) Christopher Daniels
  - (United States) James Storm
  - (United States) Kazarian
  - (United States) Kenny King
  - (United States) Mickie James
- Team UK
  - (United Kingdom) Douglas Williams
  - (United Kingdom) Magnus
  - (United Kingdom) Rob Terry
  - (United Kingdom) Rockstar Spud
  - (United Kingdom) Hannah Blossom
- Team International
  - (Japan) Funaki
  - (Puerto Rico) Mesias
  - (Canada) Petey Williams
  - (India) Sonjay Dutt
  - (Tonga) Lei'D Tapa
- Team Aces & Eights
  - D.O.C.
  - Knux
  - Mr. Anderson
  - Wes Brisco
  - Ivelisse

No.	Results	Stipulations	Times
1	(United Kingdom) Team UK's Magnus defeated Team Aces & Eights' Mr. Anderson	Singles match	10:51
2	(United States) Team USA's Kenny King defeated (India) Team International's Sonjay Dutt	Singles match	11:35
3	(Tonga) Team International's Lei'D Tapa defeated (United Kingdom) Team UK's Hannah Blossom	Singles match	5:02
4	Team Aces & Eights' D.O.C. and Knux defeated (United Nations) Team International's Funaki and Petey Williams	Tag team match	10:55
5	Team Aces & Eights' Wes Brisco defeated (United Kingdom) Team UK's Rockstar Spud	Singles match	7:04
6	(United States) Team USA's Bad Influence (Christopher Daniels and Kazarian) defeated (United Kingdom) Team UK's British Invasion (Douglas Williams and Rob Terry)	Tag team match	11:10
7	Team Aces & Eights' Ivelisse defeated (United States) Team USA's Mickie James	Singles match	9:22
8	(United States) Team USA's James Storm defeated (Puerto Rico) Team International's Mesias	Singles match	11:06
9	(United States) Team USA (Christopher Daniels, James Storm, Kazarian, Kenny King and Mickie James) defeated Team Aces & Eights (D.O.C., Knux, Mr. Anderson, Wes Brisco and Ivelisse)	Five-on-Five Elimination Tag Team match	18:25

Points

Place	Team	Points	Matches
1	USA	4	5
2	Aces & Eights	3	5
3	UK	1	4
3	International	1	4

Ten-person elimination tag team match

Wrestler	Team	Order	Eliminated by	Elimination move	Time
Kenny King	USA	1	Wes Brisco	Pinned after Brisco reversed a suplex into the ring with Ivelisse holding the ropes	6:37
Ivelisse	Aces & Eights	2	Mickie James	Pinned after a Lou Thesz press from the top rope	9:35
Mickie James	USA	3	Wes Brisco	Pinned with a Schoolboy	9:43
Wes Brisco	Aces & Eights	4	James Storm	Pinned after a Double knee backbreaker	9:53
Knux	Aces & Eights	5	Christopher Daniels	Pinned after a BME	12:20
Mr. Anderson	Aces & Eights	6	James Storm	Pinned with a Schoolboy	18:14
D.O.C	Aces & Eights	7	James Storm	Pinned after a Last Call	18:25
(United States) James Storm, Kazarian and Christopher Daniels	USA	—	Winners	—	18:25
