= Knockouts Knockdown =

Women's professional wrestling event series

- Promotions: Total Nonstop Action Wrestling
- First event: 2013
- Last event: 2021
- Event gimmick: Women's professional wrestling

Knockouts Knockdown was a periodic women's professional wrestling event produced by Total Nonstop Action Wrestling (TNA). It was the company's only event to consist solely of women's matches, showcasing the company's women's division, dubbed the Knockouts. The inaugural event was held in March 2013 and had been held as a One Night Only event until 2017. The sixth and most recent event was held in September 2021 and aired one month later.

== History ==
One Night Only was a series of professional wrestling events held by Total Nonstop Action Wrestling (TNA) launched in April 2013. The concept was announced on January 11, 2013 by then-Total Nonstop Action (TNA) President Dixie Carter as a part of a change to their pay-per-view programming. Among these events were Knockouts Knockdown.

The inaugural Knockouts Knockdown was held on March 17, 2013 and aired on September 6. From that time, it had been held at the Impact Zone until 2017, with the that year's event being the last one held there. The sixth and most recent Knockouts Knockdown was held on September 17, 2021 and aired on October 9.

== Events ==
#	Event	Date	City	Venue	Main event
1	Knockouts Knockdown (2013)	March 17, 2013	Orlando, Florida	Impact Zone	Knockouts Gauntlet match to crown the "Queen of the Knockouts"
2	Knockouts Knockdown 2014	May 10, 2014	Orlando, Florida	Impact Zone	Knockouts Gauntlet match to crown the "Queen of the Knockouts"
3	Knockouts Knockdown 2015	February 15, 2015	Orlando, Florida	Impact Zone	Knockouts Gauntlet match to crown the "Queen of the Knockouts"
4	Knockouts Knockdown 2016	March 17, 2016	Orlando, Florida	Impact Zone	Knockouts Gauntlet match to crown the "Queen of the Knockouts"
5	Victory Road – Knockouts Knockdown	March 3–4, 2017	Orlando, Florida	Impact Zone	Leva Bates, Alisha Edwards, Santana Garrett, and ODB vs. Laurel Van Ness, Rosemary, Angelina Love, and Diamanté in a Four-on-Four tag team match
6	Knockouts Knockdown (2021)	September 17, 2021	Nashville, Tennessee	Skyway Studios	Decay (Havok and Rosemary) (c) vs. The Influence (Madison Rayne and Tenille Dashwood) for the Impact Knockouts Tag Team Championship
(c) – refers to the champion(s) heading into the match
