= Monster's Ball match =

Professional wrestling match type

A Monster's Ball match is a professional wrestling, hardcore match type that originated in and is primarily staged by Total Nonstop Action Wrestling (TNA - known as Impact Wrestling from 2017-2023).

The key premise of the match is that all contenders are sequestered alone in a locked room without light, food, or water for 24 hours before the match, to induce extreme feelings of aggression in the competitors. Once released, the wrestlers fight one another in a no disqualification match, with the usage of weapons encouraged. Victory can be achieved by pinfall or submission, with the match ending as soon as one wrestler is pinned or submits (there is no elimination format).

There have been 60 Monster's Ball matches conducted by TNA, with several unaffiliated independent promotions hosting the match type as well. It was the signature match stipulation of Abyss. Before his retirement in 2019, he had appeared in 48 of the 50 Monster's Ball matches held by TNA to that point and managed in another.

== Match history (TNA) ==
| # | Match | Event | Date | Location | Notes | Ref |
|---|---|---|---|---|---|---|
| 1 | Monty Brown defeated Raven and Abyss | Victory Road | November 7, 2004 | Orlando, Florida | | |
| 2 | Rhino defeated Abyss, Sabu, and Jeff Hardy | Bound for Glory | October 23, 2005 | Orlando, Florida | | |
| 3 | Samoa Joe defeated Abyss and Rhino | House show | June 10, 2006 | Wayne, New Jersey | | |
| 4 | Rhino defeated Abyss | House show | September 29, 2006 | Richmond, Virginia | | |
| 5 | Samoa Joe defeated Brother Runt, Raven, and Abyss | Bound for Glory | October 22, 2006 | Plymouth Township, Michigan | Jake "The Snake" Roberts was the special guest referee | |
| 6 | Abyss defeated Raven, Black Reign and Rhino | Bound for Glory | October 14, 2007 | Duluth, Georgia | | |
| 7 | Beer Money, Inc. (Robert Roode & James Storm) (w/Jacqueline) (c) defeated Abyss & Matt Morgan, Team 3D (Brother Ray & Brother Devon), and The Latin American Xchange (Homicide & Hernandez) to retain the TNA World Tag Team Championship | Bound for Glory IV | October 12, 2008 | Hoffman Estates, Illinois | Steve "Mongo" McMichael was the special guest referee | |
| 8 | Taylor Wilde defeated Daffney (w/Abyss & Dr. Stevie) | Sacrifice | May 24, 2009 | Orlando, Florida | First ever Knockouts Monster's Ball match | |
| 9 | Abyss & Taylor Wilde defeated Raven & Daffney (w/Dr. Stevie) | Slammiversary | June 21, 2009 | Auburn Hills, Michigan | First ever mixed tag team Monster's Ball match | |
| 10 | Abyss defeated Mick Foley | Bound for Glory | October 18, 2009 | Irvine, California | Dr. Stevie was the special guest referee for the match | |
| 11 | Abyss defeated Rhino | House show | November 9, 2009 | Nashville, Tennessee | | |
| 12 | A.J. Styles defeated Abyss | TNA Impact! | May 3, 2010 | Orlando, Florida | | |
| 13 | Abyss defeated Desmond Wolfe | Slammiversary VIII | June 13, 2010 | Orlando, Florida | | |
| 14 | Jeff Hardy defeated Abyss | House show | July 2, 2010 | Brooklyn, New York | | |
| 15 | Jeff Hardy defeated Abyss | House show | July 23, 2010 | Bloomington, Illinois | | |
| 16 | Jeff Hardy defeated Abyss | House show | July 24, 2010 | LaPorte, Indiana | | |
| 17 | Jeff Hardy defeated Abyss | House show | August 13, 2010 | Baton Rouge, Louisiana | | |
| 18 | Jeff Hardy defeated Abyss | House show | August 14, 2010 | Thibodaux, Louisiana | Mick Foley was the special guest referee | |
| 19 | Jeff Hardy defeated Abyss | House show | September 16, 2010 | York, Pennsylvania | | |
| 20 | Jeff Hardy defeated Abyss | House show | September 17, 2010 | Wilkes-Barre, Pennsylvania | | |
| 21 | Tommy Dreamer defeated Abyss | House show | September 23, 2010 | New York City, New York | Mick Foley was the special guest referee | |
| 22 | Abyss defeated Tommy Dreamer | House show | September 25, 2010 | Rahway, New Jersey | | |
| 23 | Rob Van Dam defeated Abyss | Bound for Glory | October 10, 2010 | Daytona Beach, Florida | | |
| 24 | Tommy Dreamer defeated Abyss | House show | October 15, 2010 | Racine, Wisconsin | | |
| 25 | Tommy Dreamer defeated Abyss | House show | October 16, 2010 | Dubuque, Iowa | | |
| 26 | Tommy Dreamer defeated Abyss | House show | October 17, 2010 | Hoffman Estates, Illinois | Mick Foley was the special guest referee | |
| 27 | Abyss defeated Sabu | House show | October 21, 2010 | Grand Rapids, Michigan | | |
| 28 | Abyss defeated Sabu | House show | October 22, 2010 | Cadillac, Michigan | | |
| 29 | Abyss defeated Sabu | House show | October 23, 2010 | Saginaw, Michigan | | |
| 30 | Abyss defeated Sabu | House show | October 24, 2010 | Port Huron, Michigan | | |
| 31 | Abyss defeated Tommy Dreamer | House show | April 9, 2011 | Pittsburgh, Pennsylvania | | |
| 32 | Abyss defeated Bully Ray | Genesis | January 8, 2012 | Orlando, Florida | As per stipulation of the match, had Abyss lost, he would have had to rejoin Immortal | |
| 33 | Joseph Park defeated Judas Mesias (w/James Mitchell) | One Night Only: Hardcore Justice 2 | July 5, 2013 | Orlando, Florida | | |
| 34 | Joseph Park defeated Bad Influence (Christopher Daniels & Kazarian) | Impact Wrestling | December 26, 2013 | Orlando, Florida | | |
| 35 | Abyss defeated Eric Young | Impact Wrestling | February 6, 2014 | Glasgow, Scotland | | |
| 36 | Jeff Hardy defeated Abyss | One Night Only: #OldSchool | February 7, 2014 | Poughkeepsie, New York | | |
| 37 | Eric Young (c) defeated Abyss | Impact Wrestling | April 17, 2014 | Orlando, Florida | Match for the TNA World Heavyweight Championship | |
| 38 | Magnus & Bram defeated Abyss & Willow | Impact Wrestling | June 26, 2014 | Bethlehem, Pennsylvania | | |
| 39 | Bram defeated Abyss | Impact Wrestling | August 7, 2014 | New York, New York | | |
| 40 | Bram defeated Abyss | One Night Only: Turning Point | January 9, 2015 | Charlottesville, Virginia | | |
| 41 | Jeff Hardy defeated Abyss | Impact Wrestling | January 30, 2015 | New York, New York | | |
| 42 | Eric Young defeated Abyss | One Night Only: Rivals | February 6, 2015 | Roanoke Rapids, North Carolina | | |
| 43 | Matt Hardy defeated Abyss | One Night Only: Hardcore Justice 2015 | February 13, 2015 | Orlando, Florida | | |
| 44 | Abyss defeated Grado | One Night Only: Live! | January 8, 2016 | Bethlehem, Pennsylvania | | |
| 45 | The Wolves (Davey Richards & Eddie Edwards) (c) defeated Decay (Crazzy Steve & Abyss) (w/Rosemary) | Impact Wrestling | February 16, 2016 | Manchester, England | Match for the TNA World Tag Team Championship | |
| 46 | Decay (Abyss & Crazzy Steve) (c) (w/Rosemary) defeated The BroMans (Robbie E & Jessie Godderz) (w/Raquel) | Impact Wrestling | July 28, 2016 | Orlando, Florida | Match for the TNA World Tag Team Championship | |
| 47 | Rosemary (c) defeated Jade | Impact Wrestling: Genesis | January 26, 2017 | Orlando, Florida | Match for the Impact Knockouts Championship | |
| 48 | Abyss (w/James Mitchell) defeated Grado | Bound for Glory | November 5, 2017 | Ottawa, Canada | As part of the story line, since Grado lost, his work visa is terminated and must leave the U.S. | |
| 49 | Kongo Kong defeated Abyss | Impact! | March 22, 2018 | Orlando, Florida | | |
| 50 | Eli Drake defeated Abyss | Homecoming | January 6, 2019 | Nashville, Tennessee | | |
| 51 | Taya Valkyrie (c) defeated Jessicka Havok, Rosemary, and Su Yung | Slammiversary XVII | July 7, 2019 | Dallas, Texas | Match for the Impact Knockouts Championship | |
| 52 | Savannah Evans defeated Alisha Edwards, Jordynne Grace, and Kimber Lee | Knockouts Knockdown | October 9, 2021 | Nashville, Tennessee | Shannon "Daffney" Spruill Memorial match | |
| 53 | PCO defeated Jonah | Impact! | May 5, 2022 | Poughkeepsie, New York | Starting with this match, the original premise of Monster's Ball returns where the participants are locked away for 24 hours beforehand. | |
| 54 | Sami Callihan defeated Moose | Slammiversary | June 19, 2022 | Nashville, Tennessee | Event also serves as Impact Wrestling's 20th Anniversary Show | |
| 55 | Masha Slamovich defeated Allie Katch | Impact! | September 29, 2022 | Nashville, Tennessee | | |
| 56 | Trey Miguel (c) defeated Crazzy Steve | Impact! | February 4, 2023 (aired February 23) | Kissimmee, Florida | Match for the Impact X Division Championship | |
| 57 | PCO defeated Steve Maclin, Rhino and Moose | Bound for Glory | October 21, 2023 | Cicero, Illinois | | |
| 58 | PCO defeated Kon | Impact! | March 23, 2024 (aired April 11) | Philadelphia, Pennsylvania | | |
| 59 | PCO (c) defeated Matt Cardona | Bound for Glory | October 26, 2024 | Detroit, Michigan | Match for the TNA Digital Media Championship and Canadian International Heavyweight Championship | |
| 60 | Xia Brookside defeated Rosemary | Impact! | May 24, 2025 (aired June 5) | Brampton, Ontario | | |

== Participant list ==
In TNA, 56 wrestlers have taken part in Monster's Ball matches. Abyss holds the record for most participations, having competed in 48 such matches, and the record for most victories with 19.

| Superstar | Victories | Appearances |
|---|---|---|
| Abyss/Joseph Park* | 19 | 48 |
| Jeff Hardy/Willow* | 9 | 11 |
| PCO | 4 | 4 |
| Tommy Dreamer | 4 | 6 |
| Bram | 3 | 3 |
| Samoa Joe | 2 | 2 |
| Taylor Wilde | 2 | 2 |
| Eric Young | 2 | 3 |
| Rhino | 2 | 5 |
| A.J. Styles | 1 | 1 |
| Davey Richards | 1 | 1 |
| Eddie Edwards | 1 | 1 |
| Eli Drake | 1 | 1 |
| James Storm | 1 | 1 |
| Kongo Kong | 1 | 1 |
| Magnus | 1 | 1 |
| Masha Slamovich | 1 | 1 |
| Matt Hardy | 1 | 1 |
| Monty Brown | 1 | 1 |
| Robert Roode | 1 | 1 |
| Savannah Evans | 1 | 1 |
| Taya Valkyrie | 1 | 1 |
| Trey Miguel | 1 | 1 |
| Xia Brookside | 1 | 1 |
| Crazzy Steve | 1 | 3 |
| Rosemary | 1 | 3 |
| Allie Katch | 0 | 1 |
| Alisha Edwards | 0 | 1 |
| Black Reign | 0 | 1 |
| Brother Devon | 0 | 1 |
| Brother Runt | 0 | 1 |
| Christopher Daniels | 0 | 1 |
| Desmond Wolfe | 0 | 1 |
| Havok | 0 | 1 |
| Hernandez | 0 | 1 |
| Homicide | 0 | 1 |
| Jade | 0 | 1 |
| Jessie Godderz | 0 | 1 |
| Jonah | 0 | 1 |
| Jordynne Grace | 0 | 1 |
| Judas Mesias | 0 | 1 |
| Kazarian | 0 | 1 |
| Kimber Lee | 0 | 1 |
| Kon | 0 | 1 |
| Matt Cardona | 0 | 1 |
| Matt Morgan | 0 | 1 |
| Mick Foley | 0 | 1 |
| Steve Maclin | 0 | 1 |
| Robbie E | 0 | 1 |
| Su Yung | 0 | 1 |
| Brother Ray/Bully Ray* | 0 | 2 |
| Daffney | 0 | 2 |
| Grado | 0 | 2 |
| Moose | 0 | 2 |
| Raven | 0 | 4 |
| Sabu | 0 | 4 |

- Abyss competed as Joseph Park in two Monster's Ball matches, the rest as Abyss.
- Jeff Hardy competed as Willow in one Monster's Ball match, the rest as Jeff Hardy.
- Bully Ray competed as Brother Ray in one Monster's Ball match, the other as Bully Ray.

== Non TNA Monster's Ball matches ==
A Monster's Ball match was announced by John Cena Sr. (father of John Cena), president of the Massachusetts-based Millennium Wrestling Federation on its MWF Xtra online show to take place at their Night of Champions show on June 21, 2008. Todd Hanson defeated Abyss, Rick Fuller and Brian Milonas to win the match and retain his MWF Heavyweight Championship. Through TNA's working relationship with Mexican promotion AAA, Verano de Escándalo on July 31, 2011, hosted a Monster's Ball match, where Chessman defeated Abyss, Extreme Tiger, and Joe Líder. On June 7, 2014, at House of Hardcore V, Abyss defeated Tommy Dreamer in a Monster's Ball match. On November 14, 2015, Abyss would face off against Sabu in a Monster's Ball match at House of Hardcore 11 in a losing effort. Abyss has brought the Monster's Ball match to several other independent promotions throughout the world. For example, in June 2018, Abyss was scheduled to face Jimmy Havoc in Melbourne, Australia in a Monster's Ball match at a World Series Wrestling event.
