= Disciples of the New Church =

Professional wrestling stable

Stable
- Members: See below
- Name(s): Disciples of the New Church; New Church Disciples; New Church
- Debut: June 19, 2002
- Disbanded: October 1, 2003
- Years active: 2002–2003

The Disciples of the New Church, also known as the New Church Disciples or simply The New Church, were a professional wrestling stable in NWA Total Nonstop Action (NWA TNA) from June 19, 2002, to October 1, 2003.

== History ==
=== NWA Total Nonstop Action (2002–2003, 2013) ===
Originally, The Disciples of the New Church formed as a heel stable consisting of Tempest, Slash, and Malice, along with Father James Mitchell as their manager. They were all introduced in Total Nonstop Action Wrestling (TNA) on June 19, 2002, when they competed in the Gauntlet for the Gold: an over-the-top rope elimination match in which the final two competitors face off in a one-fall singles match to crown the first NWA World Heavyweight Champion of the TNA era. Malice and Ken Shamrock were the last two remaining in the Gauntlet for the gold match, with Ken Shamrock winning via pinfall, thus leading up to a feud between him and The New Church.

On the next PPV, the following week, The New Church interrupted a speech by Ken Shamrock. James Mitchell challenged Shamrock to a match with his Disciple, Malice, for the NWA World Heavyweight Championship, and Ken Shamrock agreed. Then Malice attacked Shamrock from behind in the ring and gave him a chokeslam. On July 3, Ken Shamrock was attacked by Malice backstage before their match even started, but Ken Shamrock competed to face Malice in the ring regardless and retained his NWA World Title after he defeated Malice in a singles match. On July 10, Slash and Tempest got a shot at the Tag Team Titles against A.J. Styles and Jerry Lynn but were defeated. Malice had another chance at a shot at the NWA title, when he faced Sabu in a number one contenders ladder match on July 17, but lost. On July 24, Malice stole the NWA World Heavyweight Championship from Ken Shamrock after he retained it in a ladder match with Sabu, but on July 31, Shamrock got it back when TNA security Don Harris interrupted after a match involving Malice and Apolo, taking the NWA World Heavyweight Championship away from Malice to bring it to its rightful owner, Ken Shamrock.

After Malice's brief feud with Ken Shamrock, he started feuding with Don Harris. On August 7, Malice and Harris wrestled each other in a first blood match, and then on August 14, they wrestled again in a last man standing match. After their last man standing match, both of them shook hands in respect for their match together. Malice then left The Disciples of the New Church. Cobain then became a part of the stable, and made a tag team with Slash. Cobain and Slash wrestled together as tag teams in TNA throughout August and September 2002, but then made a short disappearance.

The "Disciples of the New Church" returned to TNA on October 30, 2002. Brian Lee became the newest member after their return and made a tag team with Slash, along with James Mitchell as manager and Bella Donna as their valet. They attacked the then current NWA World Tag Team Champions, America's Most Wanted (James Storm and Chris Harris) demanding a shot at the NWA Tag Team Championships. On November 6, "The New Church" members Slash and Brian Lee wrestled against America's Most Wanted in a tag team match for the NWA Tag Titles, but lost via disqualification. The New Church members Brian Lee and Slash, however, defeated America's Most Wanted the following week on November 13, in another tag team match, becoming the new NWA World Tag Team Champions. On November 20, America's Most Wanted wrestled against The New Church in a rematch, but lost. The New Church successfully defended their titles throughout December 2002 before dropping the titles back to AMW in their final encounter on January 8, 2003, PPV. Bella Donna then left The Disciples of the New Church.

The "Disciples of the New Church" turned babyfaces when they joined the battle with Team Extreme (Sandman, Perry Saturn and New Jack) and the NWA against Sports Entertainment Xtreme (S.E.X.). On April 9, Disciples turned on Team Extreme in a three-way tag team match by attacking them through a fireball in Sandman's face. They battled Team Extreme and The Gathering throughout the entire year before they were taken out by Raven one by one.

On March 5, 2013, Slash and Sinn appeared at TNA One Night Only pay-per-view Hardcore Justice 2. The Disciples of the New Church were defeated by Latin American Xchange.

=== After wrestling ===
The stable's valet, BellaDonna, whose real name was Leah Roxanne Biggerstaff, died on January 21, 2019. She was 39. Also known as Rocksan Biggerstaff, she was also a bass guitarist for the Nashville pop punk band Teen Idols in the mid-1990s.

== Members ==
- Wrestlers
  - Mike Awesome
  - Shane Douglas
  - Kobain
  - Brian Lee
  - Malice
  - Sinn
  - Slash
  - Tempest
  - Vampiro
- Managers
  - Father James Mitchell
  - BellaDonna (valet)

== Championships and accomplishments ==
- Total Nonstop Action Wrestling

- NWA World Tag Team Championship – Brian Lee and Slash (1 time)

== See also ==
- Disciples of Apocalypse
- The Ministry of Darkness
- The New Blood
