= TNA One Night Only (2016) =

Total Nonstop Action Wrestling's One Night Only events during 2016

TNA One Night Only (2016) is a series of professional wrestling One Night Only events held by Total Nonstop Action Wrestling (TNA) in 2016.

== One Night Only: Live! ==
One Night Only: Live!
- Promotion: Total Nonstop Action Wrestling
- Date: January 8, 2016
- City: Bethlehem, Pennsylvania
- Venue: Sands Bethlehem Event Center

One Night Only chronology
← Previous; Global Impact: USA vs The World	Next → Rivals 2016

One Night Only: Live! was a professional wrestling pay-per-view (PPV) event produced by Total Nonstop Action Wrestling (TNA), which took place on January 8, 2016 at the Sands Bethlehem Event Center in Bethlehem, Pennsylvania.

No.	Results	Stipulations	Times
1	Tigre Uno (c) defeated DJ Z, Mandrews and Crazzy Steve	Four-Way elimination match for the TNA X Division Championship	10:19
2	Rockstar Spud defeated Aiden O'Shea	Singles match	09:28
3	Mike Bennett (with Maria) defeated Robbie E	Singles match	07:08
4	Awesome Kong defeated Velvet Sky, Madison Rayne, Rebel, Jade, Marti Bell, Chelsea and Deonna	#1 Contenders Knockouts Gauntlet match for the TNA Knockouts Championship	16:03
5	Trevor Lee defeated Pepper Parks	Singles match	07:54
6	Abyss defeated Grado	Monster's Ball match	09:10
7	The Wolves (Davey Richards and Eddie Edwards) (c) defeated Kurt Angle and Drew Galloway and Eli Drake and Jessie Godderz via submission	Three-way tag team match for the TNA World Tag Team Championship	10:18
8	Lashley defeated Tyrus	Singles match	09:30
9	Beer Money, Inc. (Bobby Roode and James Storm) defeated Eric Young and Bram	Tag team match	14:15
(c) / – the champion(s) heading into the match

Gauntlet Battle Royal

Draw	Entrant	Order	Eliminated by	Time
1	Madison Rayne	7	Kong	16:03
2	Jade	6	Rayne	14:15
3	Rebel	1	Chelsea	6:30
4	Chelsea	3	Kong	7:26
5	Marti Bell	4	Rayne	6:22
6	Deonna	2	Kong	3:06
7	Awesome Kong	-	Winner	9:12
8	Velvet Sky	5	Jade	2:47

== Rivals 2016 ==
Rivals 2016
- Promotion: Total Nonstop Action Wrestling
- Date: January 5–7, 2016 (aired February 5, 2016)
- City: Bethlehem, Pennsylvania
- Venue: Sands Bethlehem Event Center

One Night Only chronology
← Previous; One Night Only: Live!	Next → Joker's Wild 2016

Rivals chronology
← Previous; 2015	Next → 2017

One Night Only: Rivals 2016 was a professional wrestling pay-per-view (PPV) event produced by Total Nonstop Action Wrestling (TNA), where TNA held a series of matches featuring various TNA wrestlers in current feuds as well as renewing some heated feuds from TNA's history. The show was taped in parts on January 5–7, 2016 at the Sands Bethlehem Event Center in Bethlehem, Pennsylvania and aired on PPV on February 5, 2016.

No.	Results	Stipulations	Times
1	Eddie Edwards defeated Davey Richards	Singles match	13:54
2	Eric Young defeated Chris Melendez	Singles match	07:44
3	Drew Galloway defeated Eli Drake	Singles match	11:15
4	Tigre Uno defeated Rockstar Spud	Singles match	09:50
5	Gail Kim (c) defeated Awesome Kong	Singles match for the TNA Knockouts Championship (Bound for Glory (2015) match)	10:05
6	Lashley defeated Mahabali Shera	Singles match	09:35
7	Ethan Carter III vs. Matt Hardy ended in a double count out	Singles match	10:33
8	The Beautiful People (Velvet Sky and Madison Rayne) defeated The Dollhouse (Jade and Marti Bell) (with Rebel)	Tag team match	05:35
9	Jessie Godderz defeated Robbie E	Singles match	06:10
10	Mr. Anderson defeated Bram	No Disqualification match	11:05
(c) / – the champion(s) heading into the match

== Joker's Wild 2016 ==
Joker's Wild 2016
- Promotion: Total Nonstop Action Wrestling
- Date: January 7–9, 2016; January 30–31, 2016 (aired March 4, 2016)
- City: Bethlehem, Pennsylvania; London and Birmingham, England
- Venue: Sands Bethlehem Event Center; Wembley Arena; Barclaycard Arena

One Night Only chronology
← Previous; Rivals 2016	Next → Knockouts Knockdown 2016

Joker's Wild chronology
← Previous; 2015	Next → 2017

One Night Only: Joker's Wild 2016 was a professional wrestling pay-per-view (PPV) event produced by Total Nonstop Action Wrestling (TNA), where twenty-four men and two women competed in a tournament for $100,000. It consisted of tag team matches in which the partners were randomly drawn in a lottery and teams had to work together to advance to the main event battle royal, with the grand prize of US$100,000. Some of the matches took place on January 7 and 9, 2016, from the Sands Bethlehem Event Center in Bethlehem, Pennsylvania while others took place on January 30–31, 2016, from the Wembley Arena in London, England and the Barclaycard Arena in Birmingham, England, with the event airing on PPV on March 4, 2016.

No.	Results	Stipulations	Times
1	The Wolves (Davey Richards and Eddie Edwards) defeated Decay (Crazzy Steve and Abyss)	Tag team match to qualify for the Gauntlet Battle Royal match later that night	07:33
2	Eric Young and Bram defeated Trevor Lee and DJZ	Tag team match to qualify for the Gauntlet Battle Royal match later that night	08:42
3	Tigre Uno and Mandrews defeated Robbie E and Jessie Godderz	Tag team match to qualify for the Gauntlet Battle Royal match later that night	06:50
4	Grado and Rockstar Spud defeated Mahabali Shera and Aiden O'Shea	Tag team match to qualify for the Gauntlet Battle Royal match later that night	06:15
5	Drew Galloway and Mike Bennett defeated Jimmy Havoc and Big Damo	Tag team match to qualify for the Gauntlet Battle Royal match later that night	08:44
6	Tyrus and Jade defeated Lashley and Gail Kim	Intergender tag team match to qualify for the Gauntlet Battle Royal match later that night	08:30
7	Matt Hardy and Will Ospreay defeated James Storm and Eli Drake	Tag team match to qualify for the Gauntlet Battle Royal match later that night	10:30
8	Drew Galloway won the $100,000 prize by last eliminating Mike Bennett	14-person intergender Joker's Wild gauntlet battle royal	30:18

== Knockouts Knockdown 2016 ==
Knockouts Knockdown 2016
- Promotion: Total Nonstop Action Wrestling
- Date: March 17, 2016 (aired April 22, 2016)
- City: Orlando, Florida
- Venue: Impact Zone

One Night Only chronology
← Previous; Joker's Wild 2016	Next → Victory Road 2016

Knockouts Knockdown chronology
← Previous; 2015	Next → 2017

One Night Only: Knockouts Knockdown 2016 was a professional wrestling pay-per-view (PPV) event produced by Total Nonstop Action Wrestling (TNA), where TNA held a series of matches featuring eight TNA Knockouts going up against eight indie wrestlers. The winner of these matches would advance to a Knockouts Gauntlet match to crown the "Queen of the Knockouts." The event took place on March 17, 2016, from the Impact Zone in Universal Studios in Orlando, Florida, and aired on PPV on April 22, 2016.

The match between Rebel and Shelly Martinez was named Worst Match of the Year in the Wrestling Observer Newsletter awards for 2016.

No.	Results	Stipulations	Times
1	Allysin Kay defeated Gail Kim by countout	Singles match to qualify for the Knockouts Gauntlet match later that night	07:55
2	Rebel defeated Shelly Martinez	Singles match to qualify for the Knockouts Gauntlet match later that night	06:15
3	Laura Dennis defeated Velvet Sky	Singles match to qualify for the Knockouts Gauntlet match later that night	04:50
4	Jade defeated Leva Bates	Singles match to qualify for the Knockouts Gauntlet match later that night	09:55
5	Rosemary (with Crazzy Steve) defeated Veda Scott	Singles match to qualify for the Knockouts Gauntlet match later that night	06:08
6	Barbi Hayden defeated Raquel	Singles match to qualify for the Knockouts Gauntlet match later that night	06:15
7	Madison Rayne defeated Deonna	Singles match to qualify for the Knockouts Gauntlet match later that night	08:40
8	Marti Bell defeated Jayme Jameson	Singles match to qualify for the Knockouts Gauntlet match later that night	06:03
9	Maria and Mike Bennett defeated Gail Kim and DJZ	Intergender tag team match	07:50
10	Jade defeated Madison Rayne, Allysin Kay, Laura Dennis, Rosemary, Barbi Hayden, Marti Bell and Rebel	Knockouts Gauntlet match to crown the "Queen of the Knockouts"	15:00

Gauntlet Battle Royal

Draw	Entrant	Order	Eliminated by	Time
1	Barbi Hayden	1	Marti Bell and Rebel	4:24
2	Marti Bell	6	Jade	10:42
3	Madison Rayne	7	Pinned by Jade	13:00
4	Rebel	3	Allysin Kay	4:17
5	Laura Dennis	2	Allysin Kay	3:41
6	Allysin Kay	5	Madison Rayne	2:38
7	Rosemary	4	Madison Rayne	00:50
8	Jade	—	Winner	6:27

== Victory Road 2016 ==
Victory Road 2016
- Promotion: Total Nonstop Action Wrestling
- Date: March 17–19, 2016 (aired May 20, 2016)
- City: Orlando, Florida
- Venue: Impact Zone

One Night Only chronology
← Previous; Knockouts Knockdown 2016	Next → World Cup 2016

One Night Only: Victory Road 2016 was a professional wrestling pay-per-view (PPV) event produced by Total Nonstop Action Wrestling (TNA). Matches for Victory Road were filmed at the March 17–19, 2016 tapings from the Impact Zone in Orlando, Florida, and aired on PPV on May 20, 2016. The event marked the final TNA appearances for TNA Originals Velvet Sky and Bobby Roode.

No.	Results	Stipulations	Times
1	Andrew Everett (with Gregory Shane Helms and Trevor Lee) defeated DJZ (with Eddie Edwards)	Singles match	09:31
2	Velvet Sky defeated Marti Bell	Singles match	07:02
3	Chris Melendez defeated Beauregarde	Singles match	05:05
4	Kurt Angle (c) defeated Mick Foley	Singles match for the TNA World Heavyweight Championship (Victory Road (2009) match)	14:06
5	James Storm defeated Bram	Singles match	12:20
6	The BroMans (Robbie E and Jessie Godderz) defeated The Tribunal (Basile Baraka and Baron Dax)	Tag team match	08:36
7	Bobby Roode defeated Braxton Sutter (with Allie)	Singles match	10:57
8	Abyss defeated Dr. Stevie	No Disqualification match (Victory Road (2009) match)	09:51
9	Trevor Lee (with Gregory Shane Helms) defeated Eddie Edwards	Singles match	10:45
10	Ethan Carter III defeated Eli Drake	Singles match	09:20
(c) / – the champion(s) heading into the match

== World Cup 2016 ==
World Cup 2016
- Promotion: Total Nonstop Action Wrestling
- Date: June 13, 2016 (aired July 22, 2016)
- City: Orlando, Florida
- Venue: Impact Zone

One Night Only chronology
← Previous; Victory Road 2016	Next → X-Travaganza 2016

World Cup chronology
← Previous; 2015	Next → Final

One Night Only: World Cup 2016 is a professional wrestling pay-per-view (PPV) event produced by Total Nonstop Action Wrestling (TNA). Teams of wrestlers and knockouts led by a male TNA wrestler will compete in singles, tag team and knockouts matches. The team that gains the most points qualify to the final match to fight for the TNA World Cup. The event took place on June 13, 2016 from the Impact Zone in Universal Studios in Orlando, Florida.

Teams and members

- Team Storm
  - James Storm (Captain)
  - Bram
  - Trevor Lee
  - Basile Baraka
  - Madison Rayne
- Team Drake
  - Eli Drake (Captain)
  - Drew Galloway
  - Mahabali Shera
  - Baron Dax
  - Sienna
- Team Hardy
  - Jeff Hardy (Captain)
  - Eddie Edwards
  - Jessie Godderz
  - Robbie E
  - Jade
- Team Bennett
  - Mike Bennett (Captain)
  - Ethan Carter III
  - Crazzy Steve
  - Grado
  - Rosemary

No.	Results	Stipulations	Times
1	Team Drake's Drew Galloway defeated Team Storm's Trevor Lee	Singles match	08:20
2	Team Bennett's Ethan Carter III defeated Team Storm's Basile Baraka	Singles match	07:47
3	James Storm defeated Eli Drake	Singles match	08:10
4	Team Hardy's Eddie Edwards defeated Team Drake's Mahabali Shera by submission	Singles match	06:44
5	Team Storm's Bram defeated Team Bennett's Crazzy Steve (with Rosemary)	Singles match	07:13
6	Team Hardy's Jessie Godderz defeated Team Drake's Baron Dax	Singles match	07:00
7	Mike Bennett defeated Jeff Hardy	Singles match	09:05
8	Team Hardy's Jade defeated Team Storm's Madison Rayne, Team Drake's Sienna and Team Bennett's Rosemary	Four-way match	07:50
9	Team Bennett's Grado defeated Team Hardy's Robbie E	Singles match	06:30
10	Team Hardy (Jeff Hardy, Eddie Edwards, Jessie Godderz, Robbie E and Jade) defeated Team Bennett (Mike Bennett, Ethan Carter III, Grado, Crazzy Steve and Rosemary)	Ten person intergender elimination tag team match	16:30

Points

Place	Team	Points	Matches
1	Team Hardy	4	6
2	Team Bennett	3	6
3	Team Storm	2	5
4	Team Drake	1	5

== X-Travaganza 2016 ==
X-Travaganza 2016
- Promotion: Total Nonstop Action Wrestling
- Date: July 13–14, 2016 (aired August 26, 2016)
- City: Orlando, Florida
- Venue: Impact Zone

One Night Only chronology
← Previous; World Cup 2016	Next → September 2016

X-Travaganza chronology
← Previous; 2015	Next → Final

One Night Only: X-Travaganza 2016 was a professional wrestling pay-per-view (PPV) event produced by Total Nonstop Action Wrestling (TNA). TNA held series of matches featuring various X Division wrestlers paying tribute and honoring the X Division by taking on five outside indy wrestlers – Chuck Taylor, Jonathan Gresham, David Starr, J. T. Dunn and Zenshi – in qualifying matches where the winner, would move on to compete in a Ladder match for a number one contenders spot for the TNA X Division Championship. Tapings took place on July 13 and 14, 2016, from the Impact Zone in Universal Studios in Orlando, Florida.

No.	Results	Stipulations	Times
1	Chuck Taylor defeated Rockstar Spud	Lumberjack match (Note: The lumberjacks were: Marshe Rockett, Jonathan Gresham, David Starr, J. T. Dunn, Caleb Konley, and Zenshi.) to qualify for the Ladder match later that night	06:06
2	Marshe Rockett defeated Mandrews	Singles match to qualify for the Ladder match later that night	08:25
3	DJZ defeated Jonathan Gresham	Singles match to qualify for the Ladder match later that night	08:00
4	Suicide defeated David Starr	Singles match to qualify for the Ladder match later that night	07:00
5	Braxton Sutter defeated J. T. Dunn	Singles match to qualify for the Ladder match later that night	09:00
6	Eddie Edwards defeated Caleb Konley	Singles match to qualify for the Ladder match later that night	09:33
7	Crazzy Steve defeated Zenshi	Singles match to qualify for the Ladder match later that night	07:13
8	The Helms Dynasty (Trevor Lee and Andrew Everett) (with Gregory Shane Helms) defeated The BroMans (Robbie E and Jessie Godderz) (with Raquel)	Ultimate X match	10:50
9	Braxton Sutter defeated DJZ, Chuck Taylor, Marshe Rockett, Eddie Edwards, Suicide and Crazzy Steve	7-man Ladder match to determine the #1 contender for the TNA X Division Championship	09:54

== September 2016 ==
September 2016
- Promotion: Total Nonstop Action Wrestling
- Date: August 11–14, 2016 (aired September 16, 2016)
- City: Orlando, Florida
- Venue: Impact Zone

One Night Only chronology
← Previous; X-Travaganza 4	Next → Against All Odds

One Night Only: September 2016 was a professional wrestling pay-per-view (PPV) event produced by Total Nonstop Action Wrestling (TNA). Tapings took place on August 11–14, 2016 from the Impact Zone in Universal Studios in Orlando, Florida. The event primarily consisted of wrestlers typically known for fighting in the X Division taking on heavyweights.

No.	Results	Stipulations	Times
1	Grado and Jade defeated Eli Drake and Sienna	Intergender tag team match	08:15
2	The Tribunal (Basile Baraka and Baron Dax) (with Al Snow) defeated The BroMans (Robbie E and Jessie Godderz) (with Raquel)	Tag team match	10:33
3	Moose defeated DJZ	Singles match	08:55
4	Mahabali Shera defeated Rockstar Spud	Singles match	07:30
5	Tyrus defeated Crazzy Steve (with Rosemary)	Singles match	05:50
6	Marti Bell defeated Madison Rayne	No Disqualification match	05:55
7	Drew Galloway defeated Andrew Everett	Singles match	11:40
8	Ethan Carter III defeated Trevor Lee	Singles match	08:58
9	Mike Bennett (with Maria) defeated Braxton Sutter	Singles match	09:50
10	Lashley defeated Eddie Edwards	Singles match	10:12

== Against All Odds ==
Against All Odds
- Promotion: Total Nonstop Action Wrestling
- Date: August 16–17, 2016 (aired November 4, 2016)
- City: Orlando, Florida
- Venue: Impact Zone

One Night Only chronology
← Previous; September 2016	Next → December 2016

Against All Odds chronology
← Previous; Against All Odds (2012)	Next → —

One Night Only: Against All Odds was a professional wrestling pay-per-view (PPV) event produced by Total Nonstop Action Wrestling (TNA). Tapings took place on August 16–17, 2016 from the Impact Zone in Universal Studios in Orlando, Florida.

No.	Results	Stipulations	Times
1	Andrew Everett defeated Mandrews	Singles match	09:30
2	Jade defeated Sienna and Marti Bell	Three-way match	07:25
3	Tyrus defeated Trevor Lee (with Andrew Everett)	Singles match	07:30
4	DJZ and The BroMans (Robbie E and Jessie Godderz) (with Raquel) defeated The Squad (Eddie Edwards, Mahabali Shera and Grado)	Six-man tag team match	08:13
5	Lashley defeated Bram	Singles match	10:10
6	Moose defeated Eli Drake	Singles match	09:25
7	Gail Kim defeated Laurel Van Ness	Singles match	08:32
8	James Storm defeated Bram	Singles match	09:45
9	Ethan Carter III defeated Matt Hardy	Singles match	09:10

== December 2016 ==
December 2016
- Promotion: Total Nonstop Action Wrestling
- Date: October 5, 2016 (aired December 12, 2016)
- City: Orlando, Florida
- Venue: Impact Zone

One Night Only chronology
← Previous; Against All Odds	Next → One Night Only: Live!

One Night Only: December 2016 was a professional wrestling pay-per-view (PPV) event produced by Total Nonstop Action Wrestling (TNA). Tapings took place on October 5, 2016 from the Impact Zone in Universal Studios in Orlando, Florida.

No.	Results	Stipulations	Times
1	Trevor Lee defeated Braxton Sutter	Singles match	10:11
2	Rosemary defeated Jade	Singles match	10:45
3	Eli Drake defeated Grado	Singles match	09:12
4	James Storm defeated Robbie E	Singles match	10:10
5	Lashley defeated Jessie Godderz	Singles match	10:57
6	Mahabali Shera defeated Aiden O'Shea by submission	Singles match	07:51
7	Bram vs. Moose ended in a double count out	Singles match	09:00
8	Tigre Uno (c) defeated DJZ, Mandrews and Crazzy Steve	Four-way elimination match for the TNA X Division Championship (One Night Only: Live match from January 2016)	10:19
9	Ethan Carter III defeated Aron Rex	Singles match	08:55
10	Eddie Edwards defeated Mike Bennett (with Maria Kanellis-Bennett)	Singles match	13:20
(c) / – the champion(s) heading into the match
