= TNA One Night Only (2014) =

Total Nonstop Action Wrestling's One Night Only events during 2014

TNA One Night Only (2014) is a series of professional wrestling One Night Only events held by Total Nonstop Action Wrestling (TNA) in 2014.

== Tag Team Tournament ==
Tag Team Tournament
- Promotion: Total Nonstop Action Wrestling
- Date: 18 March 2013 (aired 3 January 2014)
- City: Orlando, Florida
- Venue: Impact Zone
- Attendance: 1,400

One Night Only chronology
← Previous; World Cup	Next → Hardcore Justice 2014

One Night Only: Tag Team Tournament was a professional wrestling pay-per-view (PPV) event produced by Total Nonstop Action Wrestling (TNA). TNA held a series of matches featuring various TNA tag teams, where the winners of these matches would advance farther in the tournament with the winners being crowned the "Best TNA Tag Team." It took place on 18 March 2013, from the Impact Zone in Orlando, Florida and aired on PPV on 3 January 2014.

No.	Results	Stipulations	Times
1	Generation Me (Jeremy Buck and Max Buck) defeated Petey Williams and Sonjay Dutt	Tag team match	08:29
2	Aces & Eights (Garett Bischoff and Wes Brisco) defeated The Hot Shots (Cassidy Riley and Chase Stevens)	Tag team match	09:00
3	Bobby Roode and Austin Aries defeated The British Invasion (Doug Williams and Rob Terry)	Tag team match	11:52
4	Chavo Guerrero and Hernandez defeated Bad Influence (Christopher Daniels and Kazarian)	Tag team match	11:11
5	Magnus and Samoa Joe defeated Aces & Eights (Garett Bischoff and Wes Brisco)	Tag team match	07:38
6	Team 3D (Bully Ray and Devon) defeated Generation Me (Jeremy Buck and Max Buck)	Tag team match	09:02
7	Austin Aries and Bobby Roode defeated Magnus and Samoa Joe	Tag team match	10:44
8	Team 3D (Bully Ray and Devon) defeated Chavo Guerrero and Hernandez	Tag team match	10:52
9	Team 3D (Bully Ray and Devon) defeated Austin Aries and Bobby Roode	Tag team match	12:10

Tournament bracket

First round
Generation Me	Pin
Williams/Dutt	8:29
Aces & Eights	Pin
Hot Shots	9:00

Second round
Generation Me	9:02
Team 3D	Pin
Guerrero/Hernandez	Pin
Bad Influence	11:11
Magnus/Joe	Pin
Aces & Eights	7:38
Aries/Roode	Pin
British Invasion	11:52

Semifinals
Team 3D	Pin
Guerrero/Hernandez	10:52
Magnus/Joe	10:44
Aries/Roode	Pin

Finals
Team 3D	Pin
Aries/Roode	12:10

== Hardcore Justice 3 ==
Hardcore Justice 3
- Promotion: Total Nonstop Action Wrestling
- Date: 29 December 2013 (aired 10 January 2014)
- City: Lowell, Massachusetts
- Venue: Lowell Auditorium
- Attendance: 1,000

One Night Only chronology
← Previous; Tag Team Tournament	Next → #OldSchool

One Night Only: Hardcore Justice 3 was a professional wrestling pay-per-view (PPV) event produced by Total Nonstop Action Wrestling (TNA). TNA goes hardcore for one night only where every match is contested under hardcore wrestling stipulations. It took place on 29 December 2013, from the Lowell Auditorium in Lowell, Massachusetts and aired on PPV on 10 January 2014.

No.	Results	Stipulations	Times
1	Ethan Carter III defeated Tommy Dreamer	Tables match	09:20
2	Austin Aries defeated Chris Sabin	Xscape match	14:38
3	Bobby Roode defeated Samoa Joe via disqualification	Singles match for the numbers advantage in the Lethal Lockdown match	10:11
4	Lei'D Tapa defeated Velvet Sky	Knockouts Street Fight	08:05
5	Joseph Park and Eric Young defeated Bad Influence (Christopher Daniels and Kazarian)	Full Metal Mayhem match	13:37
6	Bully Ray defeated Mr. Anderson	Last Man Standing match	13:01
7	Team Angle (Kurt Angle, Samoa Joe, James Storm and Abyss) defeated Team Roode (Bobby Roode, Robbie E, Jessie Godderz and Magnus)	Lethal Lockdown match	21:16

== #OldSchool ==
1. OldSchool
- Promotion: Total Nonstop Action Wrestling
- Date: 30 December 2013 (aired 7 February 2014)
- City: Poughkeepsie, New York
- Venue: Mid-Hudson Civic Center
- Attendance: 1,500

One Night Only chronology
← Previous; Hardcore Justice 2014	Next → Joker's Wild 2

One Night Only: #OldSchool took place on 30 December 2013, from the Mid-Hudson Civic Center in Poughkeepsie, New York and aired on PPV on 7 February 2014.

No.	Results	Stipulations	Times
1	Austin Aries defeated Chris Sabin and Sonjay Dutt	Three-way match	08:29
2	Ethan Carter III defeated Dewey Barnes	Singles match	1:50
3	Bully Ray defeated Tommy Dreamer	Falls Count Anywhere match	14:26
4	Bad Influence (Christopher Daniels and Kazarian) and Velvet Sky defeated The BroMans (Jessie Godderz and Robbie E) and Lei'D Tapa	Six-person intergender tag team match with Eric Young as the special guest referee	11:01
5	Jeff Hardy defeated Abyss	Monster's Ball match	15:58
6	Kurt Angle defeated Mr. Anderson	Singles match	11:25
7	Bobby Roode defeated James Storm	Last Man Standing match	16:55
8	Magnus (c) defeated Samoa Joe	Singles match for the TNA World Heavyweight Championship	14:42
(c) / – the champion(s) heading into the match

== Joker's Wild 2 ==
Joker's Wild 2
- Promotion: Total Nonstop Action Wrestling
- Date: 2 February 2014 (aired 9 May 2014)
- City: Birmingham, England
- Venue: National Indoor Arena
- Attendance: 3,000

One Night Only chronology
← Previous #OldSchool	Next → Global Impact Japan

Joker's Wild chronology
← Previous; 2013	Next → 2015

One Night Only: Joker's Wild 2 was made up of tag team matches in which the partners were randomly drawn in a lottery and teams had to work together to advance to the main event battle royal, with the grand prize of US$100,000. It took place on 2 February 2014, from the National Indoor Arena in Birmingham, England and aired on PPV on 9 May 2014.

No.	Results	Stipulations	Times
1	The British Invasion (Magnus and Doug Williams) defeated Chris Sabin and Gunner	Tag team match to qualify for the Gauntlet Battle Royal match later that night	08:32
2	Samoa Joe and Bad Bones defeated Christopher Daniels and Robbie E	Tag team match to qualify for the Gauntlet Battle Royal match later that night	07:14
3	Bully Ray and Rockstar Spud defeated Mr. Anderson and Austin Aries	Tag team match to qualify for the Gauntlet Battle Royal match later that night	11:39
4	The Wolves (Eddie Edwards and Davey Richards) defeated Beer Money, Inc. (James Storm and Bobby Roode)	Tag team match to qualify for the Gauntlet Battle Royal match later that night	11:01
5	Eric Young and Ethan Carter III defeated Curry Man and Kazarian	Tag team match to qualify for the Gauntlet Battle Royal match later that night	08:05
6	Samuel Shaw and Abyss defeated DJZ and Jessie Godderz	Tag team match to qualify for the Gauntlet Battle Royal match later that night	09:43
7	Velvet Sky, Madison Rayne and ODB defeated Gail Kim, Lei'D Tapa and Alpha Female	Six-Knockout tag team elimination match	07:17
8	Ethan Carter III defeated Magnus, Doug Williams, Samoa Joe, Bad Bones, Bully Ray, Rockstar Spud, Eric Young, Eddie Edwards, Davey Richards, Samuel Shaw and Abyss	12-man Joker's Wild gauntlet battle royal	23:17

Gauntlet battle royal

Draw	Entrant	Order	Eliminated by	Time
1	Davey Richards	2	Abyss	
2	Eddie Edwards	1	Abyss	
3	Samuel Shaw	4	Abyss	
4	Rockstar Spud	9	Eric Young	
5	Doug Williams	3	Abyss	
6	Abyss	8	Ethan Carter III, Eric Young and Magnus	
7	Bully Ray	6	Rockstar Spud	
8	Eric Young	10	Magnus	
9	Ethan Carter III	—	Winner	
10	Bad Bones	5	Samoa Joe	
11	Samoa Joe	7	Magnus	
12	Magnus	11	Ethan Carter III	

Six Knockout elimination tag team match

Knockout	Order	Eliminated by	Elimination move	Time
Alpha Female	1	Velvet Sky	Pinned after an In Yo' Face	
Velvet Sky	2	Gail Kim	Pinned with a Schoolgirl	
Madison Rayne	3	Lei'D Tapa	Pinned after a Fireman's carry stunner	
Gail Kim	4	ODB	Pinned with a Schoolgirl	
Lei'D Tapa	5	ODB	Pinned after a Big boot by Kim and a Bam	
ODB	—	Winner	—	

== Global Impact Japan ==
Global Impact Japan
- Promotion(s): Total Nonstop Action Wrestling; Wrestle-1
- Date: 2 March 2014 (aired 4 July 2014)
- City: Tokyo, Japan
- Venue: Ryōgoku Kokugikan
- Attendance: 5,800

One Night Only chronology
← Previous; Joker's Wild 2	Next → X-Travaganza 2014

One Night Only: Global Impact Japan was a TNA / Wrestle-1 supershow in Tokyo, Japan. The TNA World Heavyweight, X Division and World Tag Team Championships were all defended during the event. The event also featured several matches not involving TNA wrestlers, dubbed "Part 1." Below are matches taped for the One Night Only PPV from "Part 2," which aired on PPV on 4 July 2014. Also aired on the One Night Only PPV was a 6-man tag team match originally aired at Lockdown (2014).

No.	Results	Stipulations	Times
1	Bad Influence (Christopher Daniels and Kazarian) defeated Junior Stars (Koji Kanemoto and Minoru Tanaka)	Tag team match	10:43
2	Gail Kim defeated Madison Rayne	Singles match	05:26
3	Abyss vs. Yoshihiro Takayama ended in a no contest	Singles match	06:45
4	Masakatsu Funaki defeated Bobby Roode	Singles match	11:27
5	The Great Muta, Rob Terry and Taiyō Kea defeated Masayuki Kono, René Duprée and Samoa Joe	Six-man tag team match	13:34
6	The BroMans (Jessie Godderz and Robbie E) defeated The Wolves (Davey Richards and Eddie Edwards) (c) and Team 246 (Kaz Hayashi and Shuji Kondo)	Three-way tag team match for the TNA World Tag Team Championship	12:45
7	Sanada defeated Austin Aries (c)	Singles match for the TNA X Division Championship	17:40
8	The Great Muta, Sanada and Yasu defeated Bad Influence (Christopher Daniels & Kazarian) and Chris Sabin	Six-man tag team steel cage match	09:25
9	Magnus (c) defeated Kai	Singles match for the TNA World Heavyweight Championship	14:37
(c) / – the champion(s) heading into the match

1. This match was originally aired at the Lockdown (2014) PPV.

== X-Travaganza 2014 ==
X-Travaganza 2014
- Promotion: Total Nonstop Action Wrestling
- Date: 12 April 2014 (aired 1 August 2014)
- City: Orlando, Florida
- Venue: Impact Zone
- Attendance: 1,100

One Night Only chronology
← Previous; Global IMPACT Japan	Next → World Cup 2014

X-Travaganza chronology
← Previous; 2013	Next → 2015

One Night Only: X-Travaganza 2014 honored and paid tribute to the X-Division as the past, present, and future X-Division stars collided. During the event, 6 non-roster X Division wrestlers competed in singles matches against 6 members of the active roster: if they would win, they would move on to compete in an Ultimate X match where the winner of that match would earn a future TNA X Division Championship match. It took place on 12 April 2014, from the Impact Zone in Orlando, Florida, and aired on PPV on 1 August 2014.

No.	Results	Stipulations	Times
1	Low Ki defeated Chris Sabin	Singles match; if Low Ki won, he qualifies for the Ultimate X match later that night	09:30
2	Rashad Cameron defeated DJ Z	Singles match; if Cameron won, he qualifies for the Ultimate X match later that night	09:13
3	Kenny King defeated Rubix	Singles match; if Rubix won, he qualifies for the Ultimate X match later that night	07:02
4	Ace Vedder defeated Manik	Singles match; if Vedder won, he qualifies for the Ultimate X match later that night	08:50
5	Sonjay Dutt defeated Rockstar Spud	Singles match; if Dutt won, he qualifies for the Ultimate X match later that night	08:05
6	Tigre Uno defeated Petey Williams	Singles match; if Williams won, he qualifies for the Ultimate X match later that night	06:43
7	The Wolves (Eddie Edwards and Davey Richards) defeated Bad Influence (Christopher Daniels and Kazarian)	EC3 Invitational Ladder match where the winner receives $25,000	14:16
8	Sanada (c) defeated Austin Aries (2–0)	Two out of three falls match for the TNA X Division Championship	15:51
9	Low Ki defeated Rashad Cameron, Ace Vedder and Sonjay Dutt	Ultimate X match for a future shot at the TNA X Division Championship	12:07
(c) / – the champion(s) heading into the match

== World Cup 2014 ==
World Cup 2014
- Promotion: Total Nonstop Action Wrestling
- Date: 12 April 2014 (aired 5 September 2014)
- City: Orlando, Florida
- Venue: Impact Zone
- Attendance: 1,100

One Night Only chronology
← Previous; X-Travaganza 2014	Next → Knockouts Knockdown 2014

World Cup chronology
← Previous; 2013	Next → 2015

One Night Only: World Cup 2014 included teams of wrestlers and Knockouts led by a team captain who would compete in singles, tag team and Knockouts matches. The team that gain the most points qualify to the final match to fight for TNA World Cup. It took place on 12 April 2014, from the Impact Zone in Orlando, Florida, and aired on PPV on 5 September 2014.

Teams and members

- Team Young
  - Eric Young (Captain)
  - Bully Ray
  - Eddie Edwards
  - Gunner
  - ODB
- Team Angle
  - Kurt Angle (Captain)
  - Davey Richards
  - Mr. Anderson
  - Sanada
  - Madison Rayne
- Team EC3
  - Ethan Carter III (Captain)
  - Jessie Godderz
  - Robbie E
  - Magnus
  - Gail Kim
- Team Roode
  - Bobby Roode (Captain)
  - James Storm
  - Kenny King
  - Samuel Shaw
  - Angelina Love

No.	Results	Stipulations	Times
1	Team Young's Eddie Edwards defeated Team Roode's James Storm	Singles match	09:51
2	Team EC3's Gail Kim defeated Team Angle's Madison Rayne	Singles match	06:57
3	Team EC3's The BroMans (Jessie Godderz and Robbie E) (with DJ Z) defeated Team Angle's Mr. Anderson and Sanada	Tag team match	08:24
4	Team Young's Eric Young defeated Team Roode's Bobby Roode	Singles match	12:50
5	Team Angle's Kurt Angle defeated Team EC3's Magnus	Singles match	07:57
6	Team Roode's Angelina Love (with Velvet Sky) defeated Team Young's ODB	Singles match	07:06
7	Team EC3's Ethan Carter III (with Rockstar Spud) defeated Team Angle's Davey Richards	Singles match	11:23
8	Team Young's Bully Ray and Gunner defeated Team Roode's Samuel Shaw and Kenny King	Tag team match	08:50
9	Team Young (Eric Young, Bully Ray, Eddie Edwards, Gunner and ODB) defeated Team EC3 (Ethan Carter III, Jessie Godderz, Robbie E, Magnus and Gail Kim) (with Rockstar Spud and DJ Z)	Five-on-Five Elimination Tag Team match	18:03

Points

Place	Team	Points	Matches
1	Team Young	4	5
2	Team EC3	3	5
3	Team Roode	1	4
3	Team Angle	1	4

Ten-person elimination tag team match

Wrestler	Team	Order	Eliminated by	Elimination move	Time
Gail Kim	EC3	1	ODB	Pinned after a Bam	
ODB	Young	2	Robbie	Pinned with a Schoolboy	
Eddie Edwards	Young	3	Godderz	Pinned with a Jackknife hold after a Bro Down	
Jessie Godderz	EC3	4	Ray	Pinned after a Side slam	
Bully Ray	Young	5	Robbie	Pinned after a Big boot by Magnus	
Robbie E	EC3	6	Gunner	Submitted to the Gun Rack	
Gunner	Young	7	Magnus	Pinned after a Magnus Driver	
Ethan Carter III	EC3	8	DQ	Disqualified for using a Low blow on Young	
Magnus	EC3	9	Young	Pinned after a Spike piledriver	
Eric Young	Young	—	Winner	—	

== Knockouts Knockdown 2014 ==
Knockouts Knockdown 2014
- Promotion: Total Nonstop Action Wrestling
- Date: 10 May 2014 (aired 7 November 2014)
- City: Orlando, Florida
- Venue: Impact Zone
- Attendance: 1,100

One Night Only chronology
← Previous; World Cup 2014	Next → Victory Road

Knockouts Knockdown chronology
← Previous; 2013	Next → 2015

One Night Only: Knockouts Knockdown 2014 held a series of matches featuring eight TNA Knockouts taking on eight independent women's wrestlers. The winner of these matches would advance to the main event, a Knockouts Gauntlet match to crown the "Queen of the Knockouts." It took place on 10 May 2014, from the Impact Zone in Orlando, Florida, and aired on PPV on 7 November 2014.

No.	Results	Stipulations	Times
1	Gail Kim defeated Veda Scott	Singles match to qualify for the Knockouts Gauntlet match later that night	07:34
2	Angelina Love defeated Scarlett	Singles match to qualify for the Knockouts Gauntlet match later that night	04:50
3	Reby defeated Velvet Sky	Singles match to qualify for the Knockouts Gauntlet match later that night	06:55
4	Madison Rayne defeated Jessicka Havok	Singles match to qualify for the Knockouts Gauntlet match later that night	08:33
5	Taryn Terrell defeated Karlee Perez	Singles match to qualify for the Knockouts Gauntlet match later that night	04:32
6	Mia Yim defeated Brittany	Singles match to qualify for the Knockouts Gauntlet match later that night	06:51
7	Brooke Tessmacher defeated Deonna	Singles match to qualify for the Knockouts Gauntlet match later that night	07:24
8	Marti Belle (with Rockstar Spud) defeated ODB	Singles match to qualify for the Knockouts Gauntlet match later that night	06:12
9	ODB defeated Rockstar Spud	Singles match	03:21
10	Madison Rayne defeated Angelina Love, Gail Kim, Brooke Tessmacher, Marti Belle, Taryn Terrell, Reby Sky, and Mia Yim	Knockouts Gauntlet match to crown the "Queen of the Knockouts"	20:50

Gauntlet Battle Royal

Draw	Entrant	Order	Eliminated by	Time
1	Gail Kim	5	Angelina Love	
2	Brooke Tessmacher	3	Taryn Terrell	
3	Mia Yim	2	Taryn Terrell	
4	Reby Sky	1	Angelina Love	
5	Angelina Love	7	Pinned by Madison Rayne	
6	Madison Rayne	—	Winner	
7	Marti Belle	6	Madison Rayne	
8	Taryn Terrell	4	Angelina Love	

== Victory Road ==
Victory Road
- Promotion: Total Nonstop Action Wrestling
- Date: 10 May 2014 (aired 5 December 2014)
- City: Orlando, Florida
- Venue: Impact Zone
- Attendance: 1,100

One Night Only chronology
← Previous; Knockouts Knockdown 2014	Next → Turning Point

Victory Road chronology
← Previous; Victory Road (2012)	Next → Impact: Victory Road (2017)

One Night Only: Victory Road was a professional wrestling pay-per-view (PPV) event produced by Total Nonstop Action Wrestling (TNA). The event included a series of matches featuring various TNA wrestlers, where the winner of these matches would advance to the main event, a gauntlet battle royal match with the winner getting a future shot at the TNA World Heavyweight Championship. It took place on 10 May 2014, from the Impact Zone in Orlando, Florida, and aired on PPV on 5 December 2014.

No.	Results	Stipulations
1	Austin Aries defeated Kenny King	Singles match to qualify for the Gauntlet Battle Royal match later that night
2	Bram defeated Davey Richards	Singles match to qualify for the Gauntlet Battle Royal match later that night
3	James Storm and Kazarian defeated The Menagerie (Knux and The Freak)	Tag team match to qualify for the Gauntlet Battle Royal match later that night
4	Lashley defeated Samoa Joe	Singles match to qualify for the Gauntlet Battle Royal match later that night
5	Abyss defeated Mr. Anderson	Singles match to qualify for the Gauntlet Battle Royal match later that night
6	The BroMans (Jessie Godderz and Robbie E) (with DJ Z) defeated Bully Ray and Rockstar Spud	Tag team match to qualify for the Gauntlet Battle Royal match later that night
7	Gunner defeated Magnus	Singles match to qualify for the Gauntlet Battle Royal match later that night
8	Ethan Carter III defeated Sanada	Singles match to qualify for the Gauntlet Battle Royal match later that night
9	Samuel Shaw defeated Crazzy Steve	Singles match to qualify for the Gauntlet Battle Royal match later that night
10	Eddie Edwards defeated DJ Z and Tigre Uno	Three-way match to qualify for the Gauntlet Battle Royal match later that night
11	Gunner defeated James Storm, Kazarian, Eddie Edwards, Samuel Shaw, Ethan Carter III, Abyss, Lashley, Austin Aries, Bram, Jessie Godderz and Robbie E	12-man Gauntlet battle royal match for a future shot at the TNA World Heavyweight Championship

Gauntlet Battle Royal

Draw	Entrant	Order	Eliminated by	Time
1	Eddie Edwards	2	Lashley	
2	Austin Aries	1	Lashley	
3	Kazarian	3	Lashley	
4	Robbie E	8	Gunner	
5	Samuel Shaw	4	Lashley	
6	Lashley	5	Robbie	
7	Abyss	6	Carter	
8	Ethan Carter III	7	Robbie and Godderz	
9	Gunner	—	Winner	
10	Jessie Godderz	9	Storm	
11	James Storm	11	Gunner	
12	Bram	10	Gunner	
