= TNA One Night Only (2015) =

Total Nonstop Action Wrestling's One Night Only events during 2015

TNA One Night Only (2015) is a series of professional wrestling One Night Only events held by Total Nonstop Action Wrestling (TNA) in 2015.

== Turning Point ==
Turning Point
- Promotion: Total Nonstop Action Wrestling
- Date: September 5, 2014 (aired January 9, 2015)
- City: Charlottesville, Virginia
- Venue: John Paul Jones Arena
- Attendance: 430

One Night Only chronology
← Previous; Victory Road	Next → Rivals

Turning Point chronology
← Previous; Turning Point (2012)	Next → Impact Wrestling: Turning Point (August 2015)

One Night Only: Turning Point was a professional wrestling pay-per-view (PPV) event produced by Total Nonstop Action Wrestling (TNA). The show was taped on September 5, 2014, at the John Paul Jones Arena in Charlottesville, Virginia and aired on PPV on January 9, 2015.

No.	Results	Stipulations	Times
1	Samoa Joe defeated Kenny King	Singles match	07:55
2	Gail Kim defeated Madison Rayne and Angelina Love	Three-way match	08:47
3	The Great Sanada defeated Austin Aries	Singles match	16:05
4	Gunner and Mr. Anderson defeated Ethan Carter III and Rockstar Spud	Tag team match	11:30
5	Eric Young defeated Magnus	Singles match	11:40
6	Bram defeated Abyss	Monster's Ball match	11:01
7	Bobby Roode defeated James Storm	Singles match	11:50
8	Jeff Hardy defeated MVP	Singles match	16:14

== Rivals ==
Rivals
- Promotion: Total Nonstop Action Wrestling
- Date: September 6, 2014 (aired February 6, 2015)
- City: Roanoke Rapids, North Carolina
- Venue: Royal Palace Theatre
- Attendance: 400

One Night Only chronology
← Previous; Turning Point	Next → Joker's Wild 2015

Rivals chronology
← Previous; First	Next → 2016

One Night Only: Rivals was a professional wrestling pay-per-view (PPV) event produced by Total Nonstop Action Wrestling (TNA), where TNA held a series of matches featuring various TNA wrestlers renewing their heated feuds from TNA's past. The show was taped on September 6, 2014, at the Royal Palace Theatre in Roanoke Rapids, North Carolina, and aired on PPV on February 6, 2015.

No.	Results	Stipulations	Times
1	Taryn Terrell defeated Gail Kim	Singles match	13:03
2	James Storm defeated Mr. Anderson	Singles match	09:09
3	Kenny King defeated The Great Sanada, DJ Z and Samoa Joe	Four-way Elimination match	09:15
4	Bram defeated Gunner	Singles match	09:22
5	Ethan Carter III (with Rockstar Spud) defeated Austin Aries	Singles match	08:27
6	Eric Young defeated Abyss	Monster's Ball match	11:34
7	Angelina Love defeated Madison Rayne	Singles match	08:44
8	Bobby Roode defeated Bobby Lashley (c)	Singles match for TNA World Heavyweight Championship (October 24, 2014 Impact Wrestling match)	17:49
9	Bobby Roode defeated MVP via disqualification	Singles match	02:30
10	Beat Down Clan (Kenny King and MVP) defeated Bobby Roode and Eric Young	Tag team match	08:18
11	Jeff Hardy defeated Magnus	Singles match	10:12
(c) / – the champion(s) heading into the match

Four-Way Elimination match

Wrestler	Order	Eliminated by	Elimination move	Time
DJ Z	1	Joe	Pinned after a muscle buster	
The Great Sanada	2	Joe	Submitted to the Coquina Clutch	
Samoa Joe	3	King	Pinned with a sitout pin after Sanada sprayed green mist into Joe's eyes	
Kenny King	Winner	-	-	

== Joker's Wild 2015 ==
Joker's Wild 2015
- Promotion: Total Nonstop Action Wrestling
- Date: February 14, 2015 (aired March 6, 2015 (aired))
- City: Orlando, Florida
- Venue: Impact Zone
- Attendance: 1,100

One Night Only chronology
← Previous; Rivals	Next → Hardcore Justice 2015

Joker's Wild chronology
← Previous; 2014	Next → 2016

One Night Only: Joker's Wild 2015 was a professional wrestling pay-per-view (PPV) event produced by Total Nonstop Action Wrestling (TNA). Thirty men and two Knockouts compete in a tournament for US$100,000 prize. The event was made up of tag team matches in which the partners are randomly drawn in a lottery and teams will work together to advance to the main event battle royal, with the grand prize of $100,000. It took place on February 14, 2015, from the Impact Zone at Universal Studios in Orlando, Florida, and aired on PPV on March 6, 2015

No.	Results	Stipulations	Times
1	The BroMans (Robbie E and Jessie Godderz) defeated Al Snow and Mr. Anderson	Tag team match to qualify for the Gauntlet Battle Royal match later that night	09:15
2	Rockstar Spud and Awesome Kong defeated Samuel Shaw and DJ Z	Tag team match to qualify for the Gauntlet Battle Royal match later that night	06:32
3	The Wolves (Eddie Edwards and Davey Richards) defeated Bobby Roode and Austin Aries	Tag team match to qualify for the Gauntlet Battle Royal match later that night	12:40
4	Ethan Carter III and Crazzy Steve defeated Knux and Tyrus	Tag team match to qualify for the Gauntlet Battle Royal match later that night	04:30
5	Eric Young and Bram defeated Magnus and Tommy Dreamer	Tag team match to qualify for the Gauntlet Battle Royal match later that night	09:20
6	James Storm and Gunner defeated Kenny King and Chris Melendez	Tag team match to qualify for the Gauntlet Battle Royal match later that night	07:03
7	Sonjay Dutt and Gail Kim defeated Tigre Uno and Manik	Tag team match to qualify for the Gauntlet Battle Royal match later that night	09:08
8	Lashley and Khoya defeated The Revolution (Abyss and The Great Sanada)	Tag team match to qualify for the Gauntlet Battle Royal match later that night	08:55
9	Lashley won the $100,000 by last eliminating Ethan Carter III	16-person intergender Joker's Wild gauntlet battle royal	32:10

Gauntlet Battle Royal

Draw	Entrant	Order	Eliminated by	Time
1	Awesome Kong	3	Carter	
2	Gail Kim	1	Godderz	
3	Jessie Godderz	7	Lashley	
4	Robbie E	6	Lashley	
5	Rockstar Spud	2	Carter	
6	Ethan Carter III	15	Lashley	
7	Gunner	5	Storm	
8	Eddie Edwards	13	Carter	
9	Davey Richards	12	Young	
10	James Storm	11	Edwards and Richards	
11	Sonjay Dutt	4	Storm	
12	Crazzy Steve	9	Young	
13	Khoya	8	Lashley	
14	Bram	10	Edwards and Richards	
15	Lashley	-	Winner	
16	Eric Young	14	Lashley	

== Hardcore Justice 2015 ==
Hardcore Justice 2015
- Promotion: Total Nonstop Action Wrestling
- Date: February 13, 2015 (aired April 1, 2015)
- City: Orlando, Florida
- Venue: Impact Zone
- Attendance: 1,100

Pay-per-view chronology
← Previous; Joker's Wild 2015	Next → X-Travaganza 2015

One Night Only: Hardcore Justice 2015 was a professional wrestling pay-per-view (PPV) event produced by Total Nonstop Action Wrestling (TNA). Hardcore rules for the stars of Hardcore wrestling, as TNA goes hardcore for one night only where every match is contested under hardcore wrestling stipulations. It took place on February 13, 2015, from the Impact Zone in Universal Studios in Orlando, Florida, and aired on PPV on April 1, 2015.

No.	Results	Stipulations	Times
1	The Wolves (Eddie Edwards and Davey Richards) defeated The Revolution (Manik and The Great Sanada)	Ladder match to determine #1 contenders for the TNA World Tag Team Championship	10:08
2	Drew Galloway defeated Kenny King	Pipe on a Pole match	09:45
3	Eric Young defeated Gunner	Tables match	10:07
4	Gail Kim defeated Havok	Street Fight	07:31
5	Matt Hardy defeated Abyss	Monster's Ball match	11:30
6	James Storm defeated Chris Melendez, Crazzy Steve, Crimson, DJ Z, Jessie Godderz, Khoya, Knux, Mr. Anderson, Robbie E, Samuel Shaw and Tyrus	12-man Hardcore Gauntlet Battle Royal	24:13
7	Ethan Carter III defeated Rockstar Spud	First Blood match	10:41
8	Bram defeated Tommy Dreamer	Six Sides of Steel match	11:35
9	Bobby Roode defeated Lashley	Last Man Standing match	13:00

Hardcore gauntlet battle royal

Draw	Entrant	Weapon	Order	Eliminated by	Time
1	Robbie E	Selfie stick	1	Tyrus	
2	Crazzy Steve	Bag of gummy bears	7	Khoya	
3	Jessie Godderz	Baseball bat	3	Knux	
4	Chris Melendez	Nightstick	2	Tyrus	
5	Samuel Shaw	Metal wire & rubber chicken	4	Crimson	
6	Khoya	The Revolution flag	9	Anderson	
7	Crimson	Trash can lid	5	Shaw	
8	Tyrus	Chain	10	Anderson	
9	Knux	Cane	8	Storm & Khoya	
10	James Storm	Noose & cowbell	-	Winner	
11	DJ Z	Hairspray	6	Steve	
12	Mr. Anderson	Microphone	11	Storm	

== X-Travaganza 2015 ==
X-Travaganza 2015
- Promotion: Total Nonstop Action Wrestling
- Date: February 15, 2015 (aired May 6, 2015)
- City: Orlando, Florida
- Venue: Impact Zone
- Attendance: 1,100

One Night Only chronology
← Previous; Hardcore Justice 2015	Next → Knockouts Knockdown 2015

X-Travaganza chronology
← Previous; 2014	Next → 2016

One Night Only: X-Travaganza 2015 was a professional wrestling pay-per-view (PPV) event produced by Total Nonstop Action Wrestling (TNA). TNA held series of matches featuring various X-Division wrestlers paying tribute and honoring the X-Division. During the event, 6 of the matches where qualifying matches where the winner, would move on to compete in an Ultimate X match. It took place on February 15, 2015, from the Impact Zone in Universal Studios in Orlando, Florida, and aired on PPV on May 6, 2015.

No.	Results	Stipulations	Times
1	Tigre Uno defeated Sonjay Dutt	Singles match to qualify for the Ultimate X match later that night	09:00
2	Kenny King defeated Jay Rios and Pepper Parks	Three-Way match to qualify for the Ultimate X match later that night	06:25
3	Manik defeated John Yurnit	Singles match to qualify for the Ultimate X match later that night	06:52
4	Crazzy Steve defeated The Great Sanada and Jonathan Cruz	Three-Way match to qualify for the Ultimate X match later that night	06:21
5	Sanada (c) defeated Crazzy Steve (with Knux, Rebel and The Freak), Davey Richards, Eddie Edwards, Manik and Tigre Uno	Ladder match for the TNA X Division Championship (Slammiversary XII match)	09:41
6	Rockstar Spud defeated Dalton Castle	Singles match to qualify for the Ultimate X match later that night	06:19
7	DJ Z defeated Mikaze	Singles match to qualify for the Ultimate X match later that night	06:40
8	Taryn Terrell defeated Angelina Love, Brooke, Gail Kim and Madison Rayne	Ladder match	07:17
9	Davey Richards defeated Eddie Edwards	Singles match	09:09
10	Austin Aries defeated Matt Hardy	Singles match	14:20
11	Rockstar Spud defeated Kenny King, DJ Z, Crazzy Steve, Manik and Tigre Uno	Ultimate X match	17:49
(c) / – the champion(s) heading into the match

== Knockouts Knockdown 2015 ==
Knockouts Knockdown 2015
- Promotion: Total Nonstop Action Wrestling
- Date: February 15, 2015 (aired July 1, 2015)
- City: Orlando, Florida
- Venue: Impact Zone
- Attendance: 1,100

One Night Only chronology
← Previous; X-Travaganza 2015	Next → World Cup 2015

Knockouts Knockdown chronology
← Previous; 2014	Next → 2016

One Night Only: Knockouts Knockdown 2015 was a professional wrestling pay-per-view (PPV) event produced by Total Nonstop Action Wrestling (TNA). TNA held a series of matches featuring various TNA Knockouts and several indie women. The winner of these matches would advance farther in Knockouts Gauntlet match to crown the "Queen of the Knockouts". It took place on February 14, 2015, from the Impact Zone in Universal Studios in Orlando, Florida, and aired on PPV on July 1, 2015.

No.	Results	Stipulations	Times
1	Madison Rayne defeated Alisha	Singles match to qualify for the gauntlet match	06:30
2	Thea Trinidad defeated Angelina Love by countout	Singles match to qualify for the gauntlet match	07:43
3	Gail Kim defeated Laura Dennis	Singles match to qualify for the gauntlet match	07:28
4	Havok defeated Solo Darling	Singles match to qualify for the gauntlet match	05:45
5	Taryn Terrell defeated Gail Kim and Havok (c)	Three way match for the TNA Knockouts Championship (November 14, 2014 Impact Wrestling match)	14:00
6	Taryn Terrell defeated Su Yung	Singles match to qualify for the gauntlet match	06:04
7	Brooke defeated Mia Yim	Singles match to qualify for the gauntlet match	04:41
8	Awesome Kong defeated MaryKate	Singles match to qualify for the gauntlet match	04:07
9	The Menagerie (Knux, Crazzy Steve and Rebel) defeated The BroMans (Jessie Godderz and Robbie E) and Angelina Love (with DJ Z)	Six-person intergender elimination tag team match	10:19
10	Awesome Kong defeated Thea Trinidad, Gail Kim, Taryn Terrell, Havok, Madison Rayne, and Brooke	Knockouts Gauntlet match to crown the "Queen of the Knockouts"	14:03
(c) / – the champion(s) heading into the match

Six-person intergender elimination tag team match

Wrestler	Order	Eliminated by	Elimination move	Time
Angelina Love	1	Rebel	Pinned after a split-legged leg drop off the top rope	04:45
Rebel	2	Godderz	Pinned with a schoolboy	04:54
Crazzy Steve	3	Godderz	Pinned with a schoolboy	08:50
Jessie Godderz	4	Knux	Pinned after a running crossbody	09:42
Robbie E	5	Knux	Pinned after a swinging reverse STO	10:19
Knux	—	Winner	—	10:19

Gauntlet Battle Royal

Draw	Entrant	Order	Eliminated by	Time
1	Thea Trinidad	1	Havok	05:47
2	Gail Kim	5	Awesome Kong and Havok	11:03
3	Madison Rayne	2	Havok	9:29
4	Havok	6	Pinned by Awesome Kong	14:03
5	Taryn Terrell	4	Havok	10:27
6	Brooke	3	Awesome Kong	10:00
7	Awesome Kong	—	Winner	14:03

== World Cup 2015 ==
World Cup 2015
- Promotion: Total Nonstop Action Wrestling
- Date: February 15, 2015 (aired August 5, 2015)
- City: Orlando, Florida
- Venue: Impact Zone
- Attendance: 1,100

One Night Only chronology
← Previous; Knockouts Knockdown 2015	Next → Gut Check 2015

World Cup chronology
← Previous; 2014	Next → 2016

One Night Only: World Cup 2015 was a professional wrestling pay-per-view (PPV) event produced by Total Nonstop Action Wrestling (TNA). Teams of wrestlers and Knockouts led by a female TNA wrestler would compete in singles, tag team and Knockouts matches. The team that gained the most points qualified to the final match to fight for TNA World Cup. The event took place on February 15, 2015, from the Impact Zone in Universal Studios in Orlando, Florida and aired on PPV on August 5, 2015.

Teams and members

- Team Young
  - Eric Young (Captain)
  - Abyss
  - Bram
  - Manik
  - Samuel Shaw
  - Havok
- Team Hardy
  - Jeff Hardy (Captain)
  - Davey Richards
  - Gunner
  - Rockstar Spud
  - Crazzy Steve
  - Gail Kim
- Team EC3
  - Ethan Carter III (Captain)
  - James Storm
  - Robbie E
  - Jessie Godderz
  - Tyrus
  - Awesome Kong
- Team Roode
  - Bobby Roode (Captain)
  - Mr. Anderson
  - Lashley
  - Magnus
  - Austin Aries
  - Taryn Terrell

No.	Results	Stipulations	Times
1	Team Roode's Austin Aries defeated Team Young's Bram	Singles match	11:01
2	Team Roode's Lashley defeated Team EC3's James Storm (with Khoya)	Singles match	07:16
3	Team EC3's The BroMans (Jessie Godderz and Robbie E) defeated Team Roode's Mr. Anderson and Magnus	Tag team match	05:35
4	Team Hardy's Rockstar Spud and Davey Richards defeated Team Young's The Revolution (Abyss and Manik)	Tag team match	08:55
5	Team Young's Samuel Shaw defeated Team Hardy's Crazzy Steve	Singles match	07:52
6	Team EC3's Awesome Kong defeated Team Young's Havok	Hardcore Match	04:47
7	Team EC3's Tyrus defeated Team Hardy's Gunner	Singles match	05:02
8	Team Hardy's Gail Kim defeated Team Roode's Taryn Terrell	Singles match	08:05
9	Jeff Hardy defeated Eric Young, Ethan Carter III and Bobby Roode	Four-way match	07:55
10	Team Hardy (Jeff Hardy, Gunner, Crazzy Steve, Rockstar Spud, Davey Richards and Gail Kim) defeated Team EC3 (Ethan Carter III, James Storm, Jessie Godderz, Robbie E, Tyrus and Awesome Kong) (with Khoya)	Six-on-Six Elimination Tag Team match	18:03

Points

Place	Team	Points	Matches
1	Team Hardy	4	6
2	Team EC3	3	6
3	Team Roode	2	5
4	Team Young	1	5

Twelve-person elimination tag team match

Wrestler	Team	Order	Eliminated by	Elimination move	Times
Crazzy Steve	Hardy	1	Tyrus	Pinned after an ICU Spike	
Awesome Kong and Gail Kim	EC3 and Hardy	2 and 3	N/A	Double countout	
Robbie E	EC3	4	Richards	Submitted to a crossface	
Jessie Godderz	EC3	5	Spud	Pinned with a schoolboy	
Rockstar Spud	Hardy	6	Tyrus	Passed out in a clawhold	
Tyrus	EC3	7	Hardy	Pinned with a schoolboy	
Gunner	Hardy	8	Storm	Pinned after a Last Call	
Davey Richards	Hardy	9	Carter	Pinned after being hit in the head with a foreign object	
Ethan Carter III	EC3	10	N/A	Disqualified for hitting Hardy with his arm brace	
James Storm	EC3	11	Hardy	Pinned after a Swanton Bomb	
Jeff Hardy	Hardy	—	Winner	—	

== Gut Check ==
Gut Check
- Promotion: Total Nonstop Action Wrestling
- Date: February 16, 2015 (aired September 4, 2015)
- City: Orlando, Florida
- Venue: Impact Zone
- Attendance: 1,100

One Night Only chronology
← Previous; World Cup 2015	Next → TNA Classic

One Night Only: Gut Check was a professional wrestling pay-per-view (PPV) event produced by Total Nonstop Action Wrestling (TNA). TNA held a series of matches featuring ten Gut Check participants, who competed in singles matches and tag match against ten members of the active roster: if they would win, they would move on to compete in the main event match where the winner of that match earns an appearance on the next live Impact Wrestling. It took place on February 16, 2015, from the Impact Zone in Universal Studios in Orlando, Florida and Aired in PPV on September 4, 2015.

No.	Results	Stipulations	Times
1	Martin Stone defeated Jessie Godderz (with Angelina Love)	Singles match; if Martin Stone won, he qualifies for the final match later that night	08:25
2	MVP defeated Jon Davis	Singles match; if Jon Davis won, he qualifies for the final match later that night	07:20
3	The Revolution (James Storm and Manik) (with Khoya) defeated The Von Erichs (Marshall and Ross Von Erich)	Tag Team match; if The Von Erichs won, they qualify for the final match later that night	08:10
4	Shaun Ricker defeated Crazzy Steve	Singles match; if Shaun Ricker won, he qualifies for the final match later that night	05:40
5	Davey Richards defeated Tony Kozina	Singles match; if Tony Kozina won, he qualifies for the final match later that night	07:45
6	Crimson defeated Samuel Shaw	Singles match; if Crimson won, he qualifies for the final match later that night	06:10
7	Tevita Fifita defeated Ethan Carter III (with Tyrus) via disqualification	Singles match; if Tevita Fifita won, he qualifies for the final match later that night	05:16
8	Dalton Castle defeated DJ Z	Singles match; if Dalton Castle won, he qualifies for the final match later that night	07:04
9	Drew Galloway defeated Pepper Parks (with Laura Dennis)	Singles match; if Pepper Parks won, he qualifies for the final match later that night	06:48
10	Tevita Fifita defeated Shaun Ricker, Martin Stone, Dalton Castle and Crimson	Five-way elimination match	14:15

Five-way elimination match

Wrestler	Order	Eliminated by	Elimination move	Time
Dalton Castle	1	Crimson	Pinned after a chokeslam	
Martin Stone	2	Ricker	Pinned after a Kryptonite Krunch	
Crimson	3	Ricker	Pinned with a roll-up after a thumb in his eye	
Shaun Ricker	4	Fifita	Pinned after a diving headbutt	
Tevita Fifita	—	Winner	—	

== The TNA Classic ==
The TNA Classic
- Promotion: Total Nonstop Action Wrestling
- Date: February 16, 2015 (aired November 6, 2015)
- City: Orlando, Florida
- Venue: Impact Zone
- Attendance: 1,100

One Night Only chronology
← Previous; TNA Gut Check	Next → Global Impact: USA vs The World

One Night Only: The TNA Classic was a professional wrestling pay-per-view (PPV) event produced by Total Nonstop Action Wrestling (TNA). TNA held a 16-man tournament where the winner will be crowned the winner of the TNA Classic. It took place on February 16, 2015, from the Impact Zone in Universal Studios in Orlando, Florida and aired on PPV November 6, 2015.

No.	Results	Stipulations	Times
1	Gunner defeated The Great Sanada	Singles match	04:55
2	Mr. Anderson defeated DJ Z	Singles match	04:09
3	Bram defeated Sonjay Dutt	Singles match	04:46
4	Austin Aries defeated Khoya	Singles match	05:39
5	MVP defeated Davey Richards	Singles match	08:25
6	Eric Young vs. Bobby Roode ended in a double countout	Singles match	09:25
7	Knux defeated Kenny King	Singles match	07:45
8	Rockstar Spud defeated Robbie E	Singles match	05:30
9	Gunner defeated Mr. Anderson	Singles match	07:55
10	Bram defeated Austin Aries	Singles match	07:27
11	Rockstar Spud defeated Knux	Singles match	07:01
12	Gunner defeated MVP	Singles match	06:20
13	Bram defeated Rockstar Spud	Singles match	01:35
14	Brooke, Taryn Terrell and Rebel defeated Havok, Madison Rayne and Angelina Love	Six Knockouts tag team match	05:50
15	Gunner defeated Bram	Singles match	06:30

First round
Gunner	Pin
The Great Sanada
Mr. Anderson	Pin
DJ Z
MVP	Pin
Davey Richards
Bobby Roode	Draw
Eric Young
Bram	Pin
Sonjay Dutt
Austin Aries	Pin
Khoya
Robbie E
Rockstar Spud	Pin
Kenny King
Knux	Pin

Quarterfinals
Gunner	Pin
Mr. Anderson
MVP	Bye
Bram	Pin
Austin Aries
Rockstar Spud	Pin
Knux

Semifinals
Gunner	Pin
MVP
Bram	Pin
Rockstar Spud

Finals
Gunner	Pin
Bram

== Global Impact – USA vs. The World ==
Global Impact – USA vs. The World
- Promotion: Total Nonstop Action Wrestling
- Date: February 13, 2015 (aired December 4, 2015)
- City: Orlando, Florida
- Venue: Impact Zone
- Attendance: 1,100

Pay-per-view chronology
← Previous; The TNA Classic	Next → One Night Only: Live!

One Night Only: Global Impact – USA vs. The World was a professional wrestling pay-per-view (PPV) event produced by Total Nonstop Action Wrestling (TNA). Two teams divided into team USA and team of wrestlers from around the world compete in heavyweight, X Division and Knockouts Division matches, The team that accumulated the most points was declared the winner. It took place on February 13, 2015, from the Impact Zone in Universal Studios in Orlando, Florida and aired on PPV December 4, 2015.

Teams and members

- Team USA
  - (United States) Ethan Carter III
  - (United States) James Storm
  - (United States) Mr. Anderson
  - (United States) Gunner
  - (United States) Austin Aries
  - (United States) Davey Richards
  - (United States) Eddie Edwards
  - (United States) Jessie Godderz
  - (United States) DJ Z
  - (United States) Taryn Terrell
- Team International
  - (Japan) The Great Muta
  - (Japan) The Great Sanada
  - (Mexico) Tigre Uno
  - (England) Magnus
  - (England) Bram
  - (England) Rockstar Spud
  - (Scotland) Drew Galloway
  - (India) Khoya
  - (India) Sonjay Dutt
  - (Canada) Angelina Love

No.	Results	Stipulations	Times
1	(United States) Team USA's Davey Richards defeated (Mexico) Team International's Tigre Uno	Singles match	10:20
2	(United States) Team USA's Taryn Terrell defeated (Canada) Team International's Angelina Love	Singles match	07:25
3	(United States) Team USA's Austin Aries defeated (Japan) Team International's The Great Sanada	Singles match	12:20
4	(England) Team International's Bram defeated (United States) Team USA's Eddie Edwards	Singles match	12:09
5	(Scotland) Team International's Drew Galloway defeated (United States) Team USA's Jessie Godderz	Singles match	09:54
6	(India) Team International's Khoya (with James Storm) defeated (United States) Team USA's Gunner	Singles match	05:10
7	(England) Team International's Rockstar Spud defeated (United States) Team USA's DJ Z	Singles match	09:05
8	(United States) Team USA's James Storm (with Khoya) vs. (England) Team International's Magnus ended in a double countout	Singles match	04:55
9	(United States) Team USA's Ethan Carter III defeated (India) Team International's Sonjay Dutt	Singles match	09:49
10	(Japan) Team International's The Great Muta defeated (United States) Team USA's Mr. Anderson	Singles match (Tie-breaker)	08:25

Points

Place	Team	Points	Matches
1	International	5	10
2	USA	4	10
