= Raquel (wrestler) =

Brazilian wrestler, wrestling valet, businesswoman and fitness model

Personal information
- Born: Gabriela Castrovinci; January 10, 1986 (age 40) Curitiba, Paraná, Brazil
- Children: 1

Professional wrestling career
- Ring name(s): Gabi Castrovinci; Gabriela Rio; Raquel
- Billed height: 5 ft 4 in (1.62 m)
- Billed weight: 123 lb (56 kg)
- Billed from: Southington, Connecticut; Brazil
- Trained by: Billy Gunn; Booker T Lita; WWE Performance Center; Afa Anoa'i
- Debut: 2015

Gabriela Castrovinci (born January 10, 1986) is a Brazilian professional wrestler, professional wrestling valet, businesswoman and fitness model best known for her time in Total Nonstop Action Wrestling (TNA) under the ring name Raquel. Castrovinci previously appeared on the sixth season of WWE's television show WWE Tough Enough.

== Early life ==
Castrovinci was born and raised in Brazil. She grew up practicing Brazilian Jiu-Jitsu and is a professional athlete for World Beauty Fitness & Fashion. She is an avid surfer and snowboarder. As a self-employed entrepreneur, Castrovinci runs an online business selling Brazilian leggings.

== Professional wrestling career ==
=== WWE (2015) ===
In 2015, Castrovinci appeared as a contestant on the sixth season of the re-launched Tough Enough finishing in tenth place. After her time in WWE Tough Enough, Castrovinci trained further with World Xtreme Wrestling and would later make her in-ring debut for them at the end of 2015. In the beginning of February, she talked with TMZ about "being assaulted" by an opponent during a match with her training company.

=== TNA Impact Wrestling (2016–2017) ===
In the year of 2016, Castrovinci signed with Total Nonstop Action Wrestling (TNA). She appeared on January 9, 2016, tapings of Impact Wrestling, and on January 12 of Impact Wrestling in a vignette, revealing her name as Raquel. When she made her debut, she was involved in segments with Lashley; however, this angle was shortly nixed, and nothing came from her appearances with him.

Raquel made her in-ring debut through the company's One Night Only PPV's mainly on Knockouts Knockdown 4 in a match against Barbi Hayden in a losing effort. During April 23 tapings, Raquel acted as a manager for The BroMans. Raquel later made appearances on Xplosion, losing matches to Madison Rayne and Jade, while being repackaged as a villainess with a "selfie-obsessed" gimmick. On January 6, 2017, Castrovinci revealed she was no longer with TNA.

== Championships and accomplishments ==
- Championship Wrestling Entertainment
  - Rise of a Queen Tournament (2016)
- Conquer Pro Wrestling
  - CPW Leading Ladies Championship (1 time)
- Orlando Pro Wrestling
  - OPW Women's Championship (1 time)
- Shine Wrestling
  - Shine Tag Team Championship (1 time) – with Santana Garrett
- Pro Wrestling 2.0
  - PW 2.0 Women's Championship (1 time)
