= Wes Brisco =

American professional wrestler (born 1983)

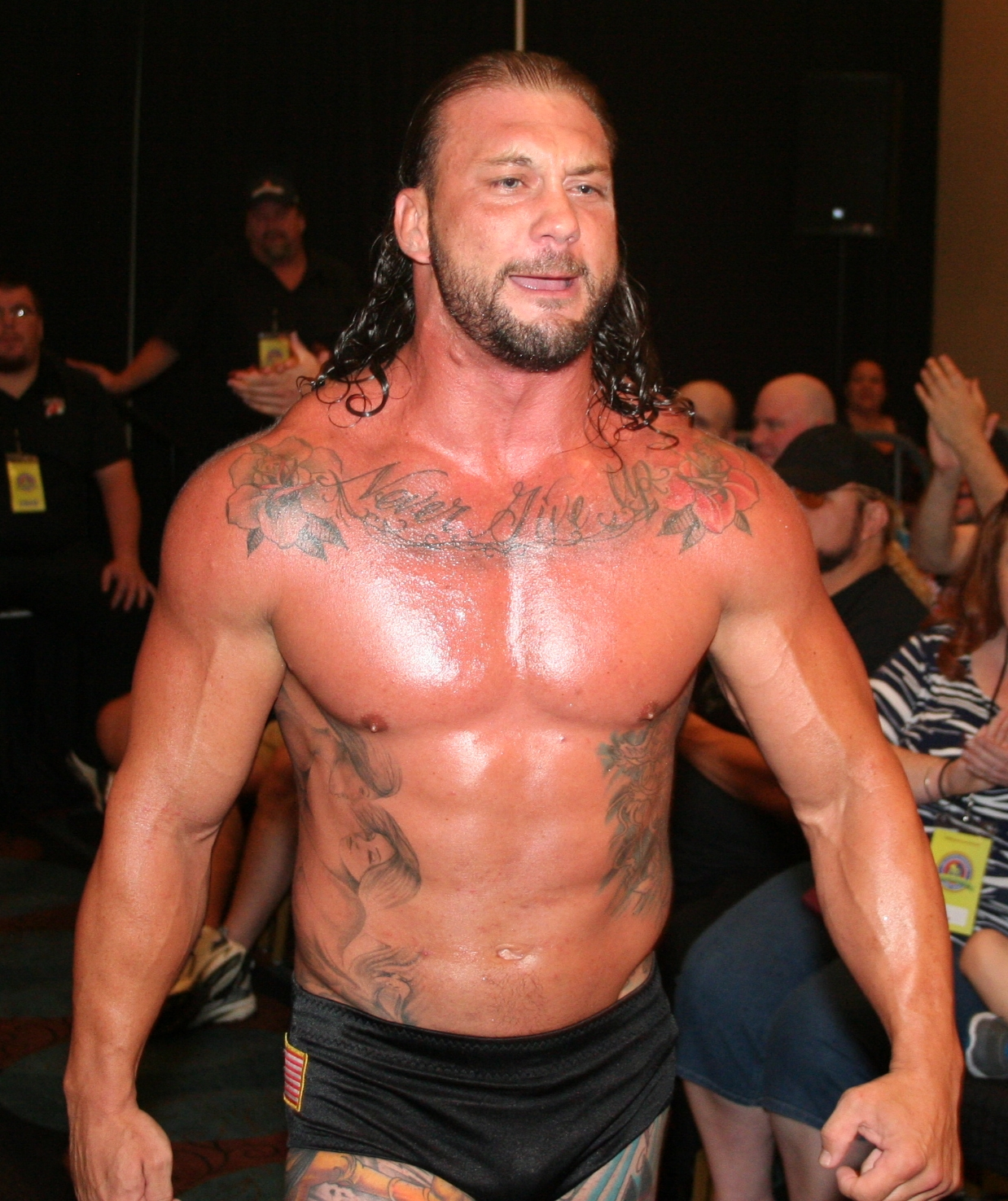
- Brisco in 2014

Personal information
- Born: Wesley Brisco; February 21, 1983 (age 43) Tampa, Florida, U.S.
- Family: Gerald Brisco (father); Jack Brisco (uncle)

Professional wrestling career
- Ring name: Wes Brisco
- Billed height: 5 ft 10 in (1.78 m)
- Billed weight: 225 lb (102 kg)
- Billed from: Tampa, Florida
- Trained by: Steve Keirn
- Debut: June 2009

Wesley Brisco (born February 21, 1983) is an American professional wrestler known for his time in Impact Wrestling (TNA), where he is a former member of Aces & Eights. He is a member of the Brisco wrestling family; the son of former Championship Wrestling from Florida mainstay Gerald Brisco and the nephew of former NWA World Heavyweight Champion Jack Brisco.

== Professional wrestling career ==
=== World Wrestling Entertainment / WWE (2009–2011) ===
Brisco signed a developmental contract with World Wrestling Entertainment in 2009 and was sent to Florida Championship Wrestling for further training. He debuted on March 3, 2009, winning a Battle Royal. The next year, he formed a tag team with Xavier Woods, winning the Florida Tag Team Championship on November 4, 2010 when they defeated the previous champions, Johnny Curtis and Derrick Bateman. On December 1, Woods and Brisco vacated the Tag Team Championship, after Brisco was sidelined with an injury. After this, Brisco was released from his contract.

=== Independent circuit (2011–present) ===
After being released from WWE, Brisco started wrestling in the independent circuit, primarily in Florida. Brisco debuted on independent circuit at Florida Underground Wrestling, on October 14, 2011, when he teamed up with Dakota Darsow and defeated JD Maverick and Kennedy Kendrick. The two teams began feuding and took each other on in one on one and tag team competition with both sides achieving wins and losses. On March 6, 2012, the feud culminated in a no holds barred street fight to become the number one contenders for the FUW Tag Team Championship which Maverick and Kendrick won. Brisco and Darsow split up looking for greener pastures in singles competitions. Brisco defeated Bruce Santee only days after the team's loss and went on to lose to Santee for the FUW Heavyweight Championship. Their feud ended in a dark match at Ring of Honor with Santee once again coming out on top. on April 24, Brisco defeated Fidel Sierra for the FUW Cuban Heavyweight Championship. He would hold the title for several months, fending off opponents such as Sam Shaw, Nick Fame and Darsow. On July 7, Brisco lost the Cuban Heavyweight Championship to JD Maverick and that also turned out to be his farewell match.

Brisco went on a month long tour of Puerto Rican promoting World Wrestling Council which started on July 14 when he defeated Mr. X. He also defeated Donny Fuggedaboudit and Johnny Fuggedaboudit with JD Maverick to crown them as the first CWF Tag Team Champions at CWF SuperClash on August 4, 2012 in Orlando, Florida. He also won another tournament with Cassidy Riley, defeating The Headbangers, to be the first NWA Ring Warriors Global Tag Team Champions. On October 26, 2012, at a World Wrestling Council he competed against the WWC Universal Heavyweight Champion Rey Fénix and Andy Leavine in a losing effort in a non-title match. He wrestled a Loser Leaves WWC Match vs Andy Leavine in a no-contest after Rey Fenix interfered, and attacked both of them at the same time with 2 steel bars. The following week, he competed with the same stipulation, except this time it was anything goes, and he defeated Andy Leavine, to (kayfabe) fire him. On February 23, 2013, Brisco & Riley lost the Ring Warriors Global Tag Team Championships.

On March 7, 2014, at NWA FUW Idus of March, Brisco defeated Michael Tarver to win the NWA FUW Heavyweight Championship. He lost the title on November 28, 2014 against JD Maverick.

Brisco works in the Canadian promotion Great North Wrestling based in Ottawa, Ontario and Eastern Ontario. He made his debut in 2016. His gimmick was the Aces of Eights. On June 30, 2017, Brisco won the GNW Canadian Title defeating Rene Dupree and Hannibal in a triple threat match in Pembroke, Ontario. He dropped the title back to Hannibal on August 5 in Ottawa, Ontario.

=== Total Nonstop Action Wrestling (2012–2014) ===
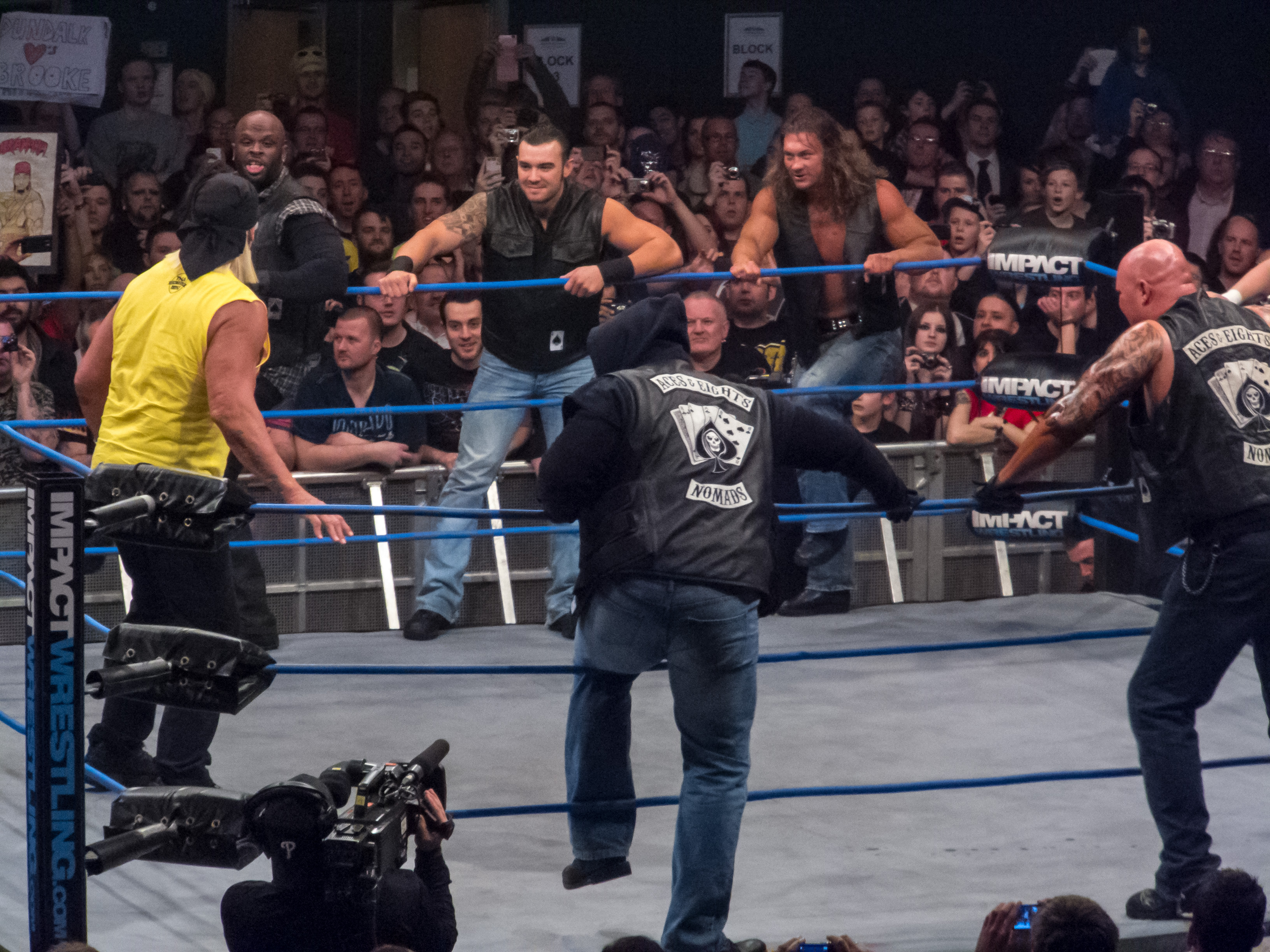
Wes Brisco (standing by the turnbuckles) as a member of Aces & Eights.

Brisco made his Total Nonstop Action Wrestling (TNA) debut on the October 11, 2012, episode Impact Wrestling, in a backstage segment with Kurt Angle. Three days later at the Bound for Glory pay-per-view, Brisco appeared during Angle's entrance. Brisco would then begin to feud with the villainous Aces & Eights stable, alongside Kurt Angle, after fending off the stable with a metal pipe, during a tag team match between Aces & Eights and Angle and Garett Bischoff on the November 15 episode of Impact Wrestling. Angle then recommended Brisco to for TNA's Gut Check program. The following week, Brisco defeated Garett Bischoff in his Gut Check match, becoming the first contestant to win their tryout match. On the next episode of Impact Wrestling, the storyline Gut Check judges agreed to give Brisco a TNA contract. Brisco wrestled his first match on a TNA pay-per-view on December 9 at Final Resolution, teaming with Garett Bischoff, Kurt Angle, and Samoa Joe to defeat Aces & Eights (Devon, D.O.C., and two masked members) in an eight-man tag team match. On the following episode of Impact Wrestling, Brisco and Bischoff teamed up to defeat Robbie E and Robbie T in a tag team match.

On the January 31 episode of Impact Wrestling, Brisco and Bischoff revealed themselves as members of Aces & Eights and attacked Kurt Angle, turning heel in the process. Brisco explained his turn the following week, claiming he should not have had to start at the bottom due to his Brisco family status. On March 10 at Lockdown, Brisco defeated Kurt Angle in a steel cage match, following interference from Aces & Eights Vice President D'Lo Brown. On the September 5 episode of Impact Wrestling, Brisco and Garett Bischoff defeated the TNA World Tag Team Champions James Storm and Gunner in a non-title match. On the September 26 episode Magnus, Samoa Joe and Sting defeated Garrett Bischoff, Knux and Brisco in a six-man tag team match after Joe made Brisco tap out to the Coquina Clutch. After the match, Bully Ray came to the ring and told Brisco that he was out of Aces and Eights, but Brisco refused to hand his kutte over to Ray. Ray then hit Brisco with a clothesline and a piledriver, after which Knux and Bischoff eventually took the kutte off Brisco and gave it to Ray - officially removing him from the group. After a four-month hiatus, TNA announced that Brisco was released from his TNA contract on January 13, 2014, ending his two-year tenure with the promotion.

=== New Japan Pro-Wrestling (2014) ===
On April 14, 2014, New Japan Pro-Wrestling (NJPW) announced that Brisco would be making his debut for the promotion representing the National Wrestling Alliance (NWA) on May 3 at Wrestling Dontaku 2014. At the event, Brisco unsuccessfully challenged Satoshi Kojima for the NWA World Heavyweight Championship. Brisco returned to the promotion on May 25 at Back to the Yokohama Arena, where he and Rob Conway unsuccessfully challenged Tencozy (Hiroyoshi Tenzan and Satoshi Kojima) for the NWA World Tag Team Championship in a three-way match, which also included K.E.S. (Davey Boy Smith Jr. and Lance Archer).

== Personal life ==
Brisco was born in Tampa, Florida and has a brother named Joseph who is a graduate student at the University of South Florida. He is the son of Gerald Brisco and nephew of Jack Brisco. On December 18, 2020, it was announced that Brisco was engaged to AEW star Red Velvet. The couple has since split.

== Championships and accomplishments ==
- Atomic Legacy Wrestling
  - ALW Heavyweight Championship (2 times)
  - ALW Next Level Championship (1 time)
  - ALW Tag Team Championship (1 time) – with Garett Bischoff
- Cauliflower Alley Club
  - Future Legend (2015)
- Continental Wrestling Federation
  - CWF Tag Team Championship (1 time) – with JD Maverick
- Florida Championship Wrestling
  - FCW Florida Tag Team Championship (1 time) – with Xavier Woods
- French Lake Wrestling Association
  - FLWA Heavyweight Championship (1 time)
- Funking Conservatory
  - FC! BANG Hardcore Championship (1 time)
  - FC! BANG International Championship (1 time)
  - FC! BANG Intergender Tag Team Championship (1 time) - with Hollywood Heather
- Great North Wrestling
  - GNW Canadian Championship (2 times)
  - GNW World Television Championship (1 time)
- Impact Pro Wrestling
  - IPW Tag Team Championship (1 time) – with Malice
- NWA Florida Underground Wrestling/Signature Pro Wrestling
  - NWA Florida Heavyweight Championship (1 time)
  - FUW Cuban Heavyweight Championship (1 time)
- Ring Warriors
  - Ring Warriors Global Tag Team Championship (1 time) – with Cassidy Riley
- Paragon Pro Wrestling
  - PPW World Championship (1 time)
  - PPW Tag Team Championship (1 time) – with Jesse Sorensen
- Pro Wrestling Illustrated
  - Ranked No. 101 of the top 500 singles wrestlers in the PWI 500 in 2013
- Total Nonstop Action Wrestling
  - TNA Gut Check winner
- Universal Championship Wrestling
  - UCW United States Championship (1 time)
- Wrestling Observer Newsletter awards
  - Worst Gimmick (2013) Aces & Eights
