= Impact One Night Only =

Wrestling event series (2013–2019)

Impact: One Night Only (originally TNA: One Night Only) is a series of professional wrestling events held from 2013 to 2019. The concept was announced on January 11, 2013 by then-Total Nonstop Action (TNA) President Dixie Carter as a part of a change to their pay-per-view programming. Prior to the change, the company held live pay-per-view events monthly.

The events were taped and released later periodically on pay-per-view typically on the first Friday of every month, except for the months that featured one of the company's main pay-per-view events. Promoted as individual "specials", the One Night Only series — unlike the live pay-per-view events — were not initially connected to the storylines featured on Impact's flagship television show, nor to each other or the mainline pay-per-view events. From 2015, storylines from Impact! would be incorporated into future One Night Only events.

In 2018, the events began streaming exclusively on the Impact's Global Wrestling Network. The following year, with the launch of Impact Plus, the One Night Only series was discontinued, succeeded by the Impact Plus Monthly Specials.

== 2013 ==
Event	Date (taped)	Date (aired)	City	Venue
X-Travaganza	January 12, 2013	April 5, 2013	Orlando, Florida	Impact Zone (Universal Studios Florida)
Joker's Wild	January 12, 2013	May 3, 2013	Orlando, Florida	Impact Zone (Universal Studios Florida)
Hardcore Justice 2	March 17, 2013	July 5, 2013	Orlando, Florida	Impact Zone (Universal Studios Florida)
10 Reunion	March 17, 2013	August 2, 2013	Orlando, Florida	Impact Zone (Universal Studios Florida)
Knockouts Knockdown	March 17, 2013	September 6, 2013	Orlando, Florida	Impact Zone (Universal Studios Florida)
Tournament of Champions	March 19, 2013	November 1, 2013	Orlando, Florida	Impact Zone (Universal Studios Florida)
World Cup	March 18, 2013	December 6, 2013	Orlando, Florida	Impact Zone (Universal Studios Florida)

== 2014 ==
Event	Date (taped)	Date (aired)	City	Venue
Tag Team Tournament	March 18, 2013	January 3, 2014	Orlando, Florida	Impact Zone (Universal Studios Florida)
Hardcore Justice 3	December 29, 2013	January 10, 2014	Lowell, Massachusetts	Lowell Memorial Auditorium
#OldSchool	December 30, 2013	February 7, 2014	Poughkeepsie, New York	Mid-Hudson Civic Center
Joker's Wild 2	February 2, 2014	May 9, 2014	Birmingham, England	National Indoor Arena
Global Impact Japan	March 2, 2014	July 4, 2014	Tokyo, Japan	Ryōgoku Kokugikan
X-Travaganza 2014	April 12, 2014	August 1, 2014	Orlando, Florida	Impact Zone (Universal Studios Florida)
World Cup 2014	April 12, 2014	September 5, 2014	Orlando, Florida	Impact Zone (Universal Studios Florida)
Knockouts Knockdown 2014	May 10, 2014	November 7, 2014	Orlando, Florida	Impact Zone (Universal Studios Florida)
Victory Road	May 10, 2014	December 5, 2014	Orlando, Florida	Impact Zone (Universal Studios Florida)

== 2015 ==
Event	Date (taped)	Date (aired)	City	Venue
Turning Point	September 5, 2014	January 9, 2015	Charlottesville, Virginia	John Paul Jones Arena
Rivals	September 6, 2014	February 6, 2015	Roanoke Rapids, North Carolina	Royal Palace Theatre
Joker's Wild 2015	February 14, 2015	March 6, 2015	Orlando, Florida	Impact Zone (Universal Studios Florida)
Hardcore Justice 2015	February 13, 2015	April 1, 2015	Orlando, Florida	Impact Zone (Universal Studios Florida)
X-Travaganza 2015	February 15, 2015	May 6, 2015	Orlando, Florida	Impact Zone (Universal Studios Florida)
Knockouts Knockdown 2015	February 15, 2015	July 1, 2015	Orlando, Florida	Impact Zone (Universal Studios Florida)
World Cup 2015	February 15, 2015	August 5, 2015	Orlando, Florida	Impact Zone (Universal Studios Florida)
Gut Check	February 16, 2015	September 4, 2015	Orlando, Florida	Impact Zone (Universal Studios Florida)
The TNA Classic	February 16, 2015	November 6, 2015	Orlando, Florida	Impact Zone (Universal Studios Florida)
Global Impact – USA vs. The World	February 13, 2015	December 4, 2015	Orlando, Florida	Impact Zone (Universal Studios Florida)

== 2016 ==
Event	Date (taped)	Date (aired)	City	Venue
One Night Only: Live!	January 8, 2016		Bethlehem, Pennsylvania	Sands Bethlehem Event Center
Rivals 2016	January 5–7, 2016	February 5, 2016	Bethlehem, Pennsylvania	Sands Bethlehem Event Center
Joker's Wild 2016	January 7–9, 2016	March 4, 2016	Bethlehem, Pennsylvania	Sands Bethlehem Event Center
Joker's Wild 2016	January 30–31, 2016	March 4, 2016	London, England	Wembley Arena
Joker's Wild 2016	January 30–31, 2016	March 4, 2016	Birmingham, England	Barclaycard Arena
Knockouts Knockdown 2016	March 17, 2016	April 22, 2016	Orlando, Florida	Impact Zone (Universal Studios Florida)
Victory Road 2016	March 17–19, 2016	May 20, 2016	Orlando, Florida	Impact Zone (Universal Studios Florida)
World Cup 2016	June 13, 2016	July 22, 2016	Orlando, Florida	Impact Zone (Universal Studios Florida)
X-Travaganza 2016	July 13–14, 2016	August 26, 2016	Orlando, Florida	Impact Zone (Universal Studios Florida)
September 2016	August 11–14, 2016	September 16, 2016	Orlando, Florida	Impact Zone (Universal Studios Florida)
Against All Odds	August 16–17, 2016	November 4, 2016	Orlando, Florida	Impact Zone (Universal Studios Florida)
December 2016	October 5, 2016	December 12, 2016	Orlando, Florida	Impact Zone (Universal Studios Florida)

== 2017 ==
Event	Date (taped)	Date (aired)	City	Venue
One Night Only: Live!	January 6, 2017		Orlando, Florida	Impact Zone (Universal Studios Florida)
Joker's Wild 2017	January 7, 2017	February 10, 2017	Orlando, Florida	Impact Zone (Universal Studios Florida)
Rivals 2017	January 8, 2017	March 17, 2017	Orlando, Florida	Impact Zone (Universal Studios Florida)
Victory Road – Knockouts Knockdown	March 3–4, 2017	April 15, 2017	Orlando, Florida	Impact Zone (Universal Studios Florida)
Turning Point 2017	April 22, 2017	May 11, 2017	Orlando, Florida	Impact Zone (Universal Studios Florida)
No Surrender 2017	April 23, 2017	June 16, 2017	Orlando, Florida	Impact Zone (Universal Studios Florida)
GFW Amped Anthology – Part 1	July 24, 2015	August 11, 2017	Paradise, Nevada	Orleans Arena
GFW Amped Anthology – Part 2	July 25, 2017	September 15, 2017	Paradise, Nevada	Orleans Arena
GFW Amped Anthology – Part 3	August 21, 2017	October 13, 2017	Paradise, Nevada	Orleans Arena
GFW Amped Anthology – Part 4	October 23, 2017	December 8, 2017	Paradise, Nevada	Orleans Arena

== 2018 ==
Event	Date (taped)	Date (aired)	City	Venue
Collision in Oklahoma	October 14, 2017	January 10, 2018	Shawnee, Oklahoma	Firelake Arena
Collision in Oklahoma	October 21, 2017	January 10, 2018	Windsor, Ontario, Canada	St. Clair College Sportsplex
Canadian Clash	October 14, 2017	February 16, 2018	Windsor, Ontario, Canada	St. Clair College Sportsplex
Canadian Clash	November 2017	February 16, 2018	Ottawa, Ontario, Canada	Aberdeen Pavilion
Canadian Clash	December 3, 2017	February 16, 2018	Belleville, Michigan	Diamondback Saloon
March Breakdown	March 3, 2018	March 16, 2018	Windsor, Ontario, Canada	St. Clair College
Cali Combat	March 24, 2018	May 11, 2018	Salinas, California	Salinas Pal Armory
Zero Fear	June 3, 2018	June 15, 2018	Mississauga, Ontario, Canada	Don Kolov Arena
Bad Intentions	August 25, 2018	August 31, 2018	Mississauga, Ontario, Canada	Don Kolov Arena
Night of the Dummies	August 25, 2018	September 14, 2018	Binghamton, New York	American Legion Post 80
BCW 25th Anniversary	October 6, 2018	November 16, 2018	Windsor, Ontario, Canada	St. Clair College Sportsplex
Back to Cali	December 1, 2018	December 21, 2018	Salinas, California	Salinas Pal Youth Center

== 2019 ==
Event	Date (taped)	Date (aired)	City	Venue
New Beginnings	January 26, 2019	February 9, 2019	Hazleton, Pennsylvania	Holy Family Academy
Clash in the Bluegrass	March 2, 2019	March 9, 2019	Louisville, Kentucky	Davis Arena
