= List of TNA Impact! special episodes =

This is a list of special episodes of the professional wrestling television series TNA Impact!, the flagship television program of the American Total Nonstop Action Wrestling promotion, which debuted on June 4, 2004. Several special episodes have featured pay-per-view-esque cards; from 2013 to 2019, these specials have aired in lieu of monthly pay-per-view events.

== List ==
Episode title	Date	Venue	Location	Rating	Note
Fox Sports Net
Impact! Premiere Episode	June 4, 2004	Universal Studios Florida	Orlando, Florida		Series premiere
Spike TV
Impact!'s Spike TV debut	October 1, 2005	Universal Studios Florida	Orlando, Florida	0.8	First ever episode of Impact! on Spike TV
Impact! Primetime Special	November 3, 2005	Universal Studios Florida	Orlando, Florida		Special 2-hour Impact! primetime special on a Thursday.
TNA New Year's Eve	December 31, 2005	Universal Studios Florida	Orlando, Florida		Special New Year's Eve edition of TNA Impact!. Also the final TNA Impact! of 2005.
TNA New Year's Day	January 1, 2006	Universal Studios Florida	Orlando, Florida		The first TNA Impact! of 2006.
Thursday Night Impact!	April 13, 2006	Universal Studios Florida	Orlando, Florida		TNA Impact! moves to Thursday nights on Spike TV.
Primetime Impact!	November 16, 2006	Universal Studios Florida	Orlando, Florida		TNA Impact! goes primetime at 9pm/et on Thursdays.
Final NWA-TNA Impact!	May 10, 2007	Universal Studios Florida	Orlando, Florida		Final TNA Impact! episode to feature championship belts from the National Wrestling Alliance (NWA) prior to TNA pulling out of the NWA.
First-ever TNA Impact!	May 17, 2007	Universal Studios Florida	Orlando, Florida		First episode of TNA Impact! after TNA pulled out of the NWA. Also the first episode to feature the Total Nonstop Action Wrestling title belts that were unveiled at the previous Sunday's Sacrifice event.
2-hour Impact!	October 4, 2007	Universal Studios Florida	Orlando, Florida		First ever 2 hour episode of TNA Impact!.
New Year's Eve Impact!	December 27, 2007	Universal Studios Florida	Orlando, Florida		The final TNA Impact! of 2007 with a New Year's Eve theme.
New Year's Impact!	January 3, 2008	Universal Studios Florida	Orlando, Florida		The first TNA Impact! of 2008.
Impact! Live	March 27, 2008	Universal Studios Florida	Orlando, Florida	1.0	First live TNA Impact! show.
Impact! Live in HD	October 23, 2008	The Joint (Hard Rock Hotel)	Paradise, Nevada	1.1	First live HD TNA Impact! filmed outside the Impact Zone at Universal Studios Florida.
Impact! 200	July 30, 2009	Universal Studios Florida	Orlando, Florida	1.3	200th episode of TNA Impact! on Spike TV.
Super Impact!	October 15, 2009	Universal Studios Florida	Orlando, Florida	1.0	Special 3-hour episode of TNA Impact! leading up to the 2009 Bound for Glory.
New Year's Knockout Eve	December 31, 2009	Universal Studios Florida	Orlando, Florida		Special 4-hour episode of TNA Impact! featuring Knockouts-only matches and a tournament to determine the #1 contender for the TNA Knockouts Championship.
Monday Night Impact!	January 4, 2010	Universal Studios Florida	Orlando, Florida	1.5	Live 3 hour edition of TNA Impact! airing on a Monday night before and during WWE's flagship show Raw.
Impact! Moves to Monday Night	March 8, 2010	Universal Studios Florida	Orlando, Florida		Marked the TNA Impact!'s permanent move to Monday nights.
8pm Impact!	April 5, 2010	Universal Studios Florida	Orlando, Florida		TNA Impact! moves an hour earlier at 8pm/et.
Impact! Moves to Thursday Night	May 13, 2010	Universal Studios Florida	Orlando, Florida		TNA Impact! returns to Thursday nights.
3 Hour Impact!	June 24, 2010	Universal Studios Florida	Orlando, Florida		TNA Impact! moves to 3 hours following TNA Reaction.
The Whole F'n Show	August 12, 2010	Universal Studios Florida	Orlando, Florida	1.2	A pay-per-view-style show on free TV. Featuring matches originally slated to be contested at the previous Sunday's Hardcore Justice, before the focus was changed to honor the veterans of Extreme Championship Wrestling.
Before the Glory	October 7, 2010	Universal Studios Florida	Orlando, Florida	1.3	Special live episode of TNA Impact! leading up to the 2010 Bound for Glory.
Debut of Impact Wrestling	May 19, 2011	Universal Studios Florida	Orlando, Florida		First episode of the newly rebranded Impact Wrestling. The change was announced during the prior episode of TNA Impact!.
Impact Wrestling Moves to 8pm	May 31, 2012	Universal Studios Florida	Orlando, Florida		Impact Wrestling moves to 8pm/et.
Destination X	July 18, 2013	Broadbent Arena	Louisville, Kentucky	1.2	Special pay-per-view (PPV) style episode of Impact Wrestling used as a replacement for the annual Destination X PPV.
Hardcore Justice	August 15, 2013; August 22, 2013	Constant Center	Norfolk, Virginia	1.0; 1.0	Special PPV style episode of Impact Wrestling used as a replacement for the annual Hardcore Justice event.
No Surrender	September 12, 2013	Chaifetz Arena	St. Louis, Missouri	1.1	Special PPV style episode of Impact Wrestling used as a replacement for the annual No Surrender event.
Impact Wrestling: Halloween Edition	October 31, 2013	Universal Studios Florida	Orlando, Florida		Special Halloween-themed episode of Impact Wrestling.
Turning Point	November 21, 2013	Universal Studios Florida	Orlando, Florida	1.0	Special PPV style episode of Impact Wrestling used as a replacement for the annual Turning Point event.
Impact Wrestling: Thanksgiving Edition	November 28, 2013	Universal Studios Florida	Orlando, Florida		Special Thanksgiving-themed episode of Impact Wrestling.
Final Resolution	December 19, 2013	Universal Studios Florida	Orlando, Florida	1.1	Special PPV style episode of Impact Wrestling used as a replacement for the annual Final Resolution event.
Genesis	January 16, 2014; January 23, 2014	Von Braun Center	Huntsville, Alabama	1.1; 1.2	Special PPV style episode of Impact Wrestling used as a replacement for the annual Genesis event.
Destination X	July 31, 2014	Manhattan Center	New York City, New York	1.0	Special PPV style episode of Impact Wrestling used as a replacement for the annual Destination X event.
Wednesday Night Impact Wrestling	August 20, 2014	Manhattan Center	New York City, New York		Impact Wrestling moves to Wednesday nights.
Hardcore Justice	August 20, 2014	Manhattan Center	New York City, New York	0.7	Special PPV style episode of Impact Wrestling used as a replacement for the annual Hardcore Justice event.
No Surrender	September 17, 2014	Manhattan Center	New York City, New York	0.9	Special PPV style episode of Impact Wrestling used as a replacement for the annual No Surrender event.
Best of Impact Wrestling 2014 Part 4	December 24, 2014				Final episode of Impact Wrestling on Spike TV.
Destination America
Impact Wrestling's Destination America premiere	January 7, 2015	Manhattan Center	New York City, New York		Impact Wrestling moves to Destination America.
Impact Wrestling moves to Friday night	January 16, 2015	Manhattan Center	New York City, New York		Impact Wrestling moves to Friday nights on Destination America
Lockdown	February 6, 2015	Manhattan Center	New York City, New York	520,000	Special PPV style episode of Impact Wrestling used as a replacement for the annual Lockdown event.
TKO: A Night of Knockouts	April 24, 2015	Universal Studios Florida	Orlando, Florida	381,000	Special PPV style episode of Impact Wrestling, centered around Knockouts matches.
Hardcore Justice	May 1, 2015	Universal Studios Florida	Orlando, Florida	520,000	Special PPV style episode of Impact Wrestling used as a replacement for the annual Hardcore Justice event.
May Mayhem	May 29, 2015	Universal Studios Florida	Orlando, Florida		Special PPV style episode of Impact Wrestling.
Impact Wrestling moves to Wednesday nights	June 3, 2015	Universal Studios Florida	Orlando, Florida		Impact Wrestling moved to Wednesday nights on Destination America and maintained that timeslot for the remainder of 2015.
Destination X	June 10, 2015	Universal Studios Florida	Orlando, Florida	330,000	Special PPV style episode of Impact used as a replacement for the annual Destination X event.
Bell To Bell	July 1, 2015	Universal Studios Florida	Orlando, Florida	267,000	Special PPV style episode of Impact Wrestling. Featured matches included: The Beat Down Clan (Hernandez, Kenny King, Low Ki and MVP) vs. The Rising (Drew Galloway, Eli Drake and Micah) in a Handicap Elimination match; The Wolves (Davey Richards and Eddie Edwards) vs. The Dirty Heels (Austin Aries and Bobby Roode) in an Iron Man match for the vacant TNA World Tag Team Championship; Taryn Terrell (c) vs. Awesome Kong and Brooke in a Three-way match for the TNA Knockouts Championship; Kurt Angle (c) vs. Ethan Carter III for the TNA World Heavyweight Championship
No Surrender	August 5, 2015	Universal Studios Florida	Orlando, Florida	327,000	Special PPV style episode of Impact Wrestling used as a replacement for the annual No Surrender event.
Turning Point	August 19, 2015	Universal Studios Florida	Orlando, Florida	323,000	Special PPV style episode of Impact Wrestling used as a replacement for the annual Turning Point event.
Pop
Impact Wrestling's premiere on Pop	January 5, 2016	Sands Casino Resort Bethlehem	Bethlehem, Pennsylvania		Impact Wrestling moves to Pop.
Lockdown	February 23, 2016	Wembley Arena	London, England	297,000	Special PPV style episode of Impact Wrestling used as a replacement for the annual Lockdown event.
Sacrifice	April 26, 2016	Universal Studios Florida	Orlando, Florida	332,000	Special PPV style episode of Impact Wrestling used as a replacement for the annual Sacrifice event.
May Mayhem	May 24, 2016	Universal Studios Florida	Orlando, Florida		Special PPV style episode of Impact Wrestling.
Gold Rush	June 14, 2016	Universal Studios Florida	Orlando, Florida		Special PPV style episode of Impact Wrestling featuring championship matches.
The Final Deletion	July 5, 2016	Universal Studios Florida	Orlando, Florida	410,000	Special episode of Impact Wrestling with the main event featuring Jeff Hardy vs. Matt Hardy, the winner receiving legal rights to the Hardy name.
Destination X	July 12, 2016	Universal Studios Florida	Orlando, Florida	358,000	Special PPV style episode of Impact Wrestling used as a replacement for the annual Destination X event.
Turning Point	August 25, 2016	Universal Studios Florida	Orlando, Florida	373,000	Special PPV style episode of Impact Wrestling used as a replacement for the annual Turning Point event.
Delete or Decay	September 8, 2016	Universal Studios Florida	Orlando, Florida	337,000	Special episode of Impact and the sequel to Final Deletion with the main event featuring The Broken Hardys vs. Decay.
Road to Glory	September 29, 2016	Universal Studios Florida	Orlando, Florida	365,000	Special episode of Impact Wrestling with the main event featuring a 4-on-4 Lethal Lockdown match between Team Lashley and Team Ethan Carter III where the winner picks the stipulation for their Bound for Glory match.
Total Nonstop Deletion	December 15, 2016	Hardy Compound	Cameron, North Carolina	329,000	Special episode of Impact Wrestling taped from "The Hardy Compound".
Genesis	January 26, 2017	Universal Studios Florida	Orlando, Florida	307,000	Special pay-per-view style episode of Impact Wrestling used as a replacement for the annual Genesis event.
Destination X	August 17, 2017	Universal Studios Florida	Orlando, Florida	320,000	Special PPV style episode of Impact Wrestling used as a replacement for the annual Destination X event.
Victory Road	September 28, 2017	Universal Studios Florida	Orlando, Florida	264,000	Special PPV style episode of Impact Wrestling used as a replacement for the annual Victory Road event.
Genesis	January 25, 2018	Aberdeen Pavilion	Ottawa, Ontario, Canada	310,000	Special pay-per-view style episode of Impact Wrestling used as a replacement for the annual Genesis event.
Crossroads	March 8, 2018	Universal Studios Florida	Orlando, Florida	325,000	Special PPV style episode of Impact Wrestling.
Under Pressure	May 31, 2018	Universal Studios Florida	Orlando, Florida	325,000	Special pay-per-view style episode of Impact Wrestling.
ReDefined	August 30, 2018	The Rebel Complex	Toronto, Ontario, Canada	225,000	Special PPV style episode of Impact Wrestling.
Pursuit Channel
Impact Wrestling's premiere on Pursuit Channel	January 11, 2019	Tennessee State Fairground Sports Arena	Nashville, Tennessee		
Uncaged	February 15, 2019	Frontón México	Mexico City, Mexico		
Against All Odds	March 29, 2019	Sam’s Town Casino	Sunrise Manor, Nevada		Special PPV style episode of Impact Wrestling used as a replacement for the annual Against All Odds event. Taped on February 17, 2019.
AXS TV
Impact Wrestling's premiere on AXS TV	October 29, 2019	St. Clair College Sportsplex	Windsor, Ontario, Canada		Impact Wrestling moves to AXS TV. Taped on October 25, 2019.
Total Nonstop Action Wrestling Special!	March 31, 2020	Coca-Cola Roxy	Cumberland, Georgia		Television Special featuring past TNA athletes.
Rebellion	April 21, 2020; April 28, 2020	Skyway Studios	Nashville, Tennessee		Special episodes of Impact Wrestling used as a replacement for Rebellion, which was originally slated to be a PPV event but was changed to a television special due to the COVID-19 pandemic. Taped from April 8–10, 2020.
Emergence	August 18, 2020; August 25, 2020	Skyway Studios	Nashville, Tennessee		Special PPV style episodes of Impact Wrestling. Taped on August 14, 2020.
Impact! moving to Thursdays	April 8, 2021	Skyway Studios	Nashville, Tennessee		Marked Impact Wrestling's permanent move to Thursday nights.
Impact! 1000	September 14, 2023; September 21, 2023	Westchester County Center	White Plains, New York		Special episodes celebrating the show's 1,000th episode. Taped on September 9, 2023.
Impact!'s 20th Anniversary Special	June 6, 2024	MegaCorp Pavilion	Newport, Kentucky		Special episode celebrating the 20th anniversary of TNA Impact!. Taped on May 19, 2024.
Halloween Impact!	October 31, 2024	Wayne State Fieldhouse	Detroit, Michigan		Special Halloween episode of TNA Impact! Taped on October 27, 2024.
Thanksgiving Impact!	November 28, 2024	Crown Arena	Fayetteville, North Carolina		Special Thanksgiving episode of TNA Impact! Taped on November 9, 2024.
Genesis Fallout	January 23, 2025	Boeing Center at Tech Port	San Antonio, Texas		A special live episode of TNA Impact! taking place after Genesis.
Countdown to Unbreakable	April 17, 2025	St. Joseph Civic Arena	St. Joseph, Missouri		Special episode used as a pre-show for Unbreakable. Taped on March 29, 2025.
Final Impact! on AXS TV	January 8, 2026	El Paso County Coliseum	El Paso, Texas		The final TNA Impact! on AXS TV.
AMC
TNA Thursday Night Impact! premiere on AMC	January 15, 2026	Curtis Culwell Center	Garland, Texas		TNA Impact! moves to AMC and AMC+.
Bound for Glory Fallout	October 15, 2026	Dothan Civic Center	Dothan, Alabama		A special episode of TNA Impact! taking place after Bound for Glory. Taped on October 13-14.
