= Impact!'s 20th Anniversary Special =

Impact Wrestling special episode

- Promotional poster
- Promotion: Total Nonstop Action Wrestling
- Date: May 19, 2024 (aired June 6, 2024)
- City: Newport, Kentucky
- Venue: MegaCorp Pavilion

List of TNA Impact! special episodes chronology
← Previous; Impact! 1000	Next → Halloween Impact!

Impact's 20th Anniversary Special was a professional wrestling television special produced by Total Nonstop Action Wrestling (TNA). The event marked the 20th anniversary of TNA's flagship weekly show Impact. The event took place on May 19, 2024, at the MegaCorp Pavilion in Newport, Kentucky and aired on tape delay on June 6, 2024, on AXS TV and TNA+ as a special episode of Impact.

== Production ==
=== Background ===
Since 2004, TNA has aired Impact the promotion's flagship weekly show. The program first aired on Fox Sports Net beginning with its first episode on June 4, 2004, which was taped from the Impact Zone at Universal Studios Florida. On October 23, 2008, TNA held their first live Impact episode outside the Impact Zone at the Joint at the Hard Rock Hotel and Casino in Las Vegas, Nevada. On October 21, 2023, following the conclusion of Bound for Glory Scott D'Amore announced that after seven years as Global Force Wrestling and Impact Wrestling, the promotion reverted to the Total Nonstop Action Wrestling (TNA) name with the first show under the revived TNA name being the Hard To Kill pay-per-view on January 13, 2024. On March 19, 2024, TNA announced that they would be returning to Newport, Kentucky for two nights of tapings for Impact and Xplosion on May 18, 2024, and May 19, 2024.

=== Storylines ===
Impact's 20th Anniversary Special featured professional wrestling matches that involves different wrestlers from pre-existing scripted feuds and storylines. Wrestlers portrayed villains, heroes, or less distinguishable characters in scripted events that built tension and culminated in a wrestling match or series of matches. Storylines were produced on Total Nonstop Action Wrestling's weekly shows Impact and Xplosion.

== Results ==
No.	Results	Stipulations	Times
1	Jake Something defeated Kon by pinfall	Singles match	5:27
2	Gisele Shaw defeated Shazza McKenzie by pinfall	Singles match	3:21
3	Speedball Mountain (Mike Bailey and Trent Seven) defeated Champagne Singh and Mustafa Ali by pinfall	Tag team match	13:29
4	Jordynne Grace (c) defeated Allysin Kay (with Marti Belle) by pinfall	Singles match for the TNA Knockouts World Championship	6:13
5	AJ Francis (with Rich Swann) defeated Laredo Kid (c)	Singles match for the TNA Digital Media Championship	5:01
6	Nic Nemeth defeated Frankie Kazarian by pinfall	Singles match	14:51
(c) / – the champion(s) heading into the match
