= Impact 1000 =

Impact Wrestling special episode

Impact! 1000
- Promotion: Impact Wrestling
- Date: September 9, 2023 (aired September 14, 2023; September 21, 2023)
- City: White Plains, New York
- Venue: Westchester County Center

List of Impact! special episodes chronology
← Previous; Emergence	Next → Impact!'s 20th Anniversary Special

Impact! 1000 was a professional wrestling television special produced by Impact Wrestling. The event took place on September 9, 2023 at the Westchester County Center in White Plains, New York, and aired on tape delay on AXS TV as a two-night special of the company's weekly television show, Impact! on, on September 14 and September 21, 2023 on. As the name suggests, the event celebrated the show's 1000th episode.

== Production ==
=== Background ===
On May 28, 2023, Impact announced that they would tape their 1,000th episode at the Westchester County Center in White Plains, New York on September 9, 2023. The event featured special appearances of numerous wrestlers from Impact's history, including dating back to the time the promotion was known as Total Nonstop Action Wrestling (TNA).

=== Storylines ===
The event featured professional wrestling matches that involved different wrestlers from pre-existing scripted feuds and storylines. Wrestlers portrayed heroes, villains, or less distinguishable characters in scripted events that built tension and culminated in a wrestling match or series of matches.

== Results ==
Night 1 (aired September 14)
No.	Results	Stipulations	Times
1^{B}	Jody Threat defeated KiLynn King	Singles match	9:29
2	Chris Bey, Crazzy Steve, Moose, and Yuya Uemura defeated Alpha Bravo, Bhupinder Gujjar, Black Taurus, Brian Myers, Heath, Jai Vidal, Joe Hendry, Johnny Swinger, John Skyler, Jonathan Gresham, Kevin Knight, Kushida, Laredo Kid, PCO, Sami Callihan, and Steve Maclin	20-man Feast or Fired match	13:34
3	Team 3D (Bully Ray and Brother Devon) defeated The Desi Hit Squad (Rohit Raju and Champagne Singh)	Tag team match	4:55
4	Frankie Kazarian and Traci Brooks defeated Eddie Edwards and Alisha Edwards	Mixed tag team match	8:32
5	Chris Sabin defeated Lio Rush (c)	Singles match for the Impact X Division Championship	16:02
(c) / – the champion(s) heading into the match; B / – the match was taped for a future broadcast of Before the Impact

Night 2 (aired September 21)
No.	Results	Stipulations	Times
1^{B}	MK Ultra (Killer Kelly and Masha Slamovich) (c) defeated The Death Dollz (Jessicka and Courtney Rush)	Tag team match for the Impact Knockouts World Tag Team Championship	8:23
2	Alan Angels defeated Mike Bailey, Ace Austin, Rich Swann, Samuray Del Sol, and Zachary Wentz	Ultimate X match to determine the #1 contender to the Impact X Division Championship	9:39
3	Jake Something defeated Dirty Dango (with Alpha Bravo)	Fox Box Rules (Note: Under the Fox Box Rules, which came from the early days of Impact, the match had a 10-minute time limit, with a judge to decide a winner in case of a time-limit draw. Chase Stevens served as the judge.)	4:56
4	Eric Young (with Scott D'Amore) defeated Kenny King (with Sheldon Jean) by disqualification	Singles match	0:35
5	Team Canada (Eric Young and Scott D'Amore) defeated Kenny King and Sheldon Jean by disqualification	Tag team match	0:10
6	America's Most Wanted (Chris Harris and James Storm) and Team Canada (Scott D'Amore and Eric Young) defeated The Design (Deaner and Kon), Kenny King, and Sheldon Jean	Eight-man tag team match	9:08
7	Josh Alexander defeated Trey Miguel (with Zachary Wentz)	Singles match	9:45
8	Team Over (Gail Kim, Jordynne Grace, Mickie James, Trinity and Awesome Kong) (with Raisha Saeed) defeated Team Beautiful People (Gisele Shaw, Angelina Love, Deonna Purrazzo, Savannah Evans and Tasha Steelz) (with Jai Vidal and Velvet Sky)	10-Knockouts tag team match	15:23
9^{D}	Tommy Dreamer and Rhino defeated The Most Professional Wrestling Gods (Brian Myers and Moose)	Tag team match	5:59
(c) / – the champion(s) heading into the match; B / – the match was taped for a future broadcast of Before the Impact; D / – this was a dark match

== See also ==
- 2023 in professional wrestling
