= TNA Impact! debut episode =

Professional wrestling television special

- Promotion: Total Nonstop Action Wrestling
- Brand: TNA Impact!
- Date: June 3, 2004 (aired June 4, 2004)
- City: Orlando, Florida
- Venue: TNA Impact Zone

Impact special episodes chronology
| ← Previous first | Next → TNA iMPACT! Spike TV debut |

The TNA Impact! Debut episode was the pilot episode for the American television program TNA Impact!, produced by the professional wrestling promotion of Total Nonstop Action Wrestling. The show took place on June 3, 2004 from Soundstage 21 (known as the Impact Zone) in Universal Studios Florida in Orlando, Florida, and was aired on tape delay on Fox Sports Net (FSN) on June 4, 2004.

== Storylines ==
The event included four matches that aired on television and three that were not televised. The matches resulted from scripted storylines and the results were predetermined by TNA's writers.

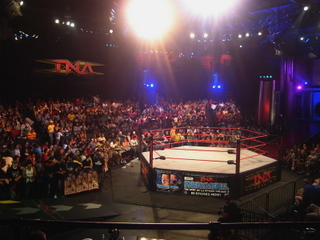
The Impact Zone

== Event ==
Don West and Mike Tenay introduced the debut of episode as part of the commentary team. Jeremy Borash was also a member of the production team.

== Results ==
| No. | Results | Stipulations | Times |
|---|---|---|---|
| 1^{D} | Desire, Pat Kenney and Sonny Siaki defeated The New York Connection (Glen Gilberti, Johnny Swinger and Trinity | Six man Tag team match | — |
| 2^{D} | Heavy Metal defeated Kazarian | Singles match | — |
| 3 | Team International (Amazing Red, Sonjay Dutt and Hector Garza defeated Team Canada (Petey Williams, Bobby Roode, and Eric Young (w/ Scott D'Amore) | Six man Tag team match | 6:19 |
| 4 | Abyss defeated Shark Boy | Singles match | 1:19 |
| 5 | America's Most Wanted (James Storm and Chris Harris) defeated Kid Kash and Dallas (c) | Tag Team match for the NWA World Tag Team Championship | 8:55 |
| 6 | AJ Styles defeated Chris Sabin, Elix Skipper, and Michael Shane | Fatal Four Way match | 6:18 |
| 7^{D} | Ron Killings defeated Abyss, David Young, Glen Gilberti, Johnny Swinger, Kazarian, Monty Brown, Pat Kenney, Raven, Sabu, and Sonny Siaki | Dark Gauntlet Match | — |
(c) / – the champion(s) heading into the match; D / – this was a dark match
