= No Surrender (2019) =

2019 wrestling event

- Promotional poster featuring Sami Callihan and Rich Swann
- Promotion(s): Impact Wrestling; Wrestling Revolver
- Date: December 7, 2019
- City: Dayton, Ohio
- Venue: The Brightside Music & Event Venue

Impact Plus Monthly Specials chronology
| ← Previous; Turning Point | Next → Bash at the Brewery 2 |

No Surrender chronology
| ← Previous; 2015 | Next → 2021 |

The 2019 No Surrender was a professional wrestling event produced by Impact Wrestling in conjunction with Wrestling Revolver. It took place on December 7, 2019, at The Brightside Music & Event Venue in Dayton, Ohio. It was the 12th event under the No Surrender chronology and aired live exclusively on Impact Plus.

Ten matches were contested at the event. In the main event, Sami Callihan successfully defended the Impact World Championship against Rich Swann. In other prominent matches, Eddie Edwards defeated Ace Austin in a Tables match, while Taya Valkyrie lost by disqualification against Havok to retain the Impact Knockouts Championship.

== Production ==
=== Background ===
No Surrender was produced as a monthly pay-per-view event by Impact Wrestling (then known as Total Nonstop Action Wrestling (TNA)) between 2005 and 2012. No Surrender was dropped after the 2012 edition as part of a larger shift in the company's monthly pay-per-view strategy, in which Impact replaced live, monthly pay-per-view events with the pre-recorded One Night Only specials starting in 2013. No Surrender would be retained as a recurring special episode of Impact's flagship television program from 2013 to 2015.

On November 12, 2019, Impact Wrestling announced No Surrender would be brought back as a monthly special to be aired exclusively on Impact Plus.

=== Storylines ===
On the November 5 episode of Impact!, the team of Daga, Rich Swann, Tessa Blanchard and Tommy Dreamer defeated oVe (Sami Callihan, Madman Fulton, Dave and Jake Crist) in an eight-man tag team match when Swann pinned Callihan. As a result of Swann's pinfall win over Callihan, Impact Wrestling announced on November 12 that Callihan would defend the Impact World Championship against Swann at No Surrender.

Eddie Edwards and Ace Austin had been feuding with each other over the past few months due to Austin stalking Edwards' wife Alisha Edwards. On November 12, it was announced that Edwards would face Austin in a Tables match at No Surrender.

== Reception ==
Larry Csonka of 411Mania reviewed the event and gave it a 6.5 out of 10. He wrote that: "Impact No Surrender 2019 was a solid but inconsistent show, with some low lows, and good to great highs. The main event was great though."

== Results ==
| No. | Results | Stipulations | Times |
|---|---|---|---|
| 1 | Trey defeated Logan James and Tyler Matrix | Triple Threat match | 08:00 |
| 2 | Rosemary defeated Madison Rayne | Singles match | 03:09 |
| 3 | Rhino defeated Jeremiah | Singles match | 00:08 |
| 4 | Rhino defeated Clayton Gainz | Singles match | 05:12 |
| 5 | Michael Elgin defeated Larry D | Singles match | 15:06 |
| 6 | Ohio Versus Everything (Dave Crist and Jake Crist) defeated The Desi Hit Squad (Mahabali Shera and Rohit Raju) and The Rascalz (Dez and Wentz) | Triple threat tag team match | 09:39 |
| 7 | Madman Fulton defeated Acey Romero, Brian Cage, Crash Jaxon, and Willie Mack | 5-way Scramble match | 16:30 |
| 8 | Havok defeated Taya Valkyrie (c) (with John E. Bravo) by disqualification | Singles match for the Impact Knockouts Championship | 06:22 |
| 9 | Eddie Edwards defeated Ace Austin | Tables match | 16:34 |
| 10 | Sami Callihan (c) defeated Rich Swann | Singles match for the Impact World Championship | 25:02 |
(c) / – the champion(s) heading into the match
