= Chris Melendez =

American professional wrestler and soldier (born 1987)

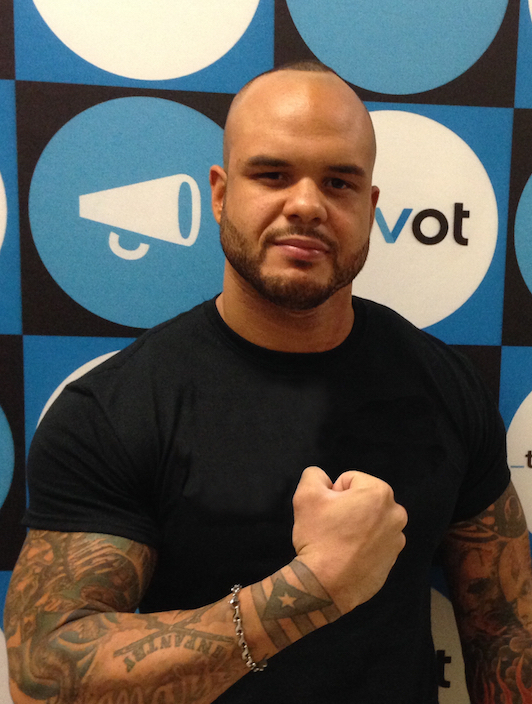
- Chris Melendez in Los Angeles, California, September 2014

Personal information
- Born: Christopher Melendez; June 13, 1987 (age 39) New York City, New York, United States
- Children: 1

Professional wrestling career
- Ring name: Chris Melendez
- Billed height: 6 ft 3 in (1.91 m)
- Billed weight: 232 lb (105 kg)
- Billed from: Harlem, New York
- Trained by: D-Von Dudley; Bubba Ray Dudley
- Debut: August 5, 2014

Christopher Melendez (born June 13, 1987) is an American professional wrestler and a second-generation United States Army Veteran, best known for his time in Total Nonstop Action Wrestling (TNA). Melendez was injured in an IED attack that cost him his left leg in Baghdad, Iraq, in 2006.

Melendez was one of five wrestlers along with a host who took part in the PSAB Ringside Salute, also known as the Ringside Salute Tour, at Prince Sultan Air Base, Saudi Arabia on February 13, 2023, organized by Armed Forces Entertainment in various deployed locations across an assigned AOR to meet and entertain service members.

== Early life ==
Growing up in New York City, Melendez felt compelled by the events of 9/11, and enlisted the military at 17 years old, serving as an Infantryman. While serving in Iraq, an improvised explosive device (IED) struck his platoon. Melendez sustained multiple life-threatening injuries, including the loss of his left leg. Combat Medics struggled to resuscitate him three times, before he was stabilized. As a result, Melendez was awarded a Purple Heart, and began physical rehabilitation at Brooke Army Medical Center. He is of Puerto Rican descent.

In 2009, Melendez began working in film and television production as a Motion Picture Studio Mechanic. He went on to work on film sets for Tyler Perry, The Smurfs, A Late Quartet and television shows such as Law and Order and Person of Interest.

== Professional wrestling career ==
Melendez began training at a small professional wrestling school in Brooklyn, New York, called The Doghouse. Melendez was then introduced to Total Nonstop Action wrestlers Ken Anderson (a former Army veteran himself) and Bully Ray through the Wounded Warrior Project. They were impressed by Melendez's physical conditioning and attitude. Inspired by Melendez's story and his passion, Ray offered for himself and longtime tag team partner Devon to train Chris at the Team 3D Academy of Professional Wrestling in Kissimmee, Florida, if he would drop everything and take the leap of faith.

=== Total Nonstop Action Wrestling (2014–2016) ===
Melendez made his in-ring debut in his hometown of New York City on August 5, 2014, where he defeated The BroMans member DJ Z. On September 17, 2014, at No Surrender, Chris Melendez defeated Kenny King. MVP and Kenny King offered Melendez to join them. After Melendez declined, King berated Melendez for refusing to join them. King attacked and referred to Melendez as a “peg leg.” King then demanded a referee. MVP's distractions, allowed Kenny King to strike from behind as the bell sounded. King dominated the match, capitalizing on his pre-match antics. King's rampage continues, but Melendez capitalized and scores the pinfall with a reversal.

Melendez teamed with Mr. Anderson, joining in the pursuit of the TNA World Tag Team Championship. On the October 22, edition of Impact Wrestling, MVP and Kenny King defeated Anderson and Melendez in the first round of the TNA tag team number one contender tournament. Chris hit King with a Fisherman's Suplex. MVP then interfered and Mr. Anderson rushed back into the ring. MVP charged toward Anderson, but Melendez blindsides MVP and sends him out of the ring. Kenny King sneaks in with a roll-up and a fistful of tights for the win.

During the November 19 Impact Wrestling, Melendez defeated Kenny King via disqualification. King attempted a springboard attack but, Melendez used his prosthetic leg, and caught him with a big boot. Melendez connected with a Fisherman's Suplex, then hoisted King onto his shoulders – MVP then interfered, viciously attacking him with a chair, causing King's disqualification leading to a hiatus from TNA. Melendez returned to television on the February 20, 2015 taping of Impact Wrestling taking part in a 20-man gauntlet in which he was eliminated by Bram. On March 17, episode of Xplosion, Melendez and Mr. Anderson (accompanied by Bully Ray) defeated The BroMans (accompanied by DJ Z and The Beautiful People). On September 23, Melendez finally defeated Eric Young in a lumberjack match to get his prosthetic leg back. On January 5–7, 2016, and March 17, 2016, he wrestled his final matches with TNA Wrestling in a losing effort in the feast or fired match, losing to Eric Young at TNA Rival 2016 and winning against Beauregarde at TNA Victory Road 2016. On June 15, 2016, Melendez announced his departure from TNA.

=== Independent circuit (2016–2019) ===
After departing from TNA, Melendez debuted for Conquer Pro Wrestling on June 4 at CPW We Don't Play Fight, where he won his match against Jack Hurley. Melendez won his debut match on July 9 at Tried-N-True Pro Wrestling's TNT United We Stand event, defeating Mahabali Shera and Tony Kozina in a Three Way match. On November 19 at TNT/GFW Road To The Gold, Melendez was eliminated by fellow TNA alumni Samuel Shaw in a Tried-N-True Title Tournament Quarter Final match. On December 9, Melendez returned to CPW, where he defeated Jack Hurley to win the CPW Heavyweight Championship for the first time. This marked the first championship Melendez won in his career.

On May 20, 2017, Melendez returned to Conquer Pro Wrestling to successfully retain the CPW Heavyweight title against his fellow then Impact Wrestling (formerly TNA) alumnus Samuel Shaw. Over a year later, on June 22, 2018, Melendez returned to CPW, where he successfully retained the brand's heavyweight title, defeating fellow Impact Wrestling alumnus Jesse Neal. On December 4, 2019, he appeared at the Impact Wrestling/TNT Salute To The Troops event to wrestle a match against Sami Callihan in a winning effort.

== Personal life ==
Melendez has a son, born in 2014.

== Championships and accomplishments ==
- Conquer Pro Wrestling
  - CPW Heavyweight Championship (1 time, current)
- Pro Wrestling Illustrated
  - PWI ranked him #207 of the top 500 singles wrestlers in the PWI 500 in 2015
