= Hardy Boyz =

Professional wrestling tag team

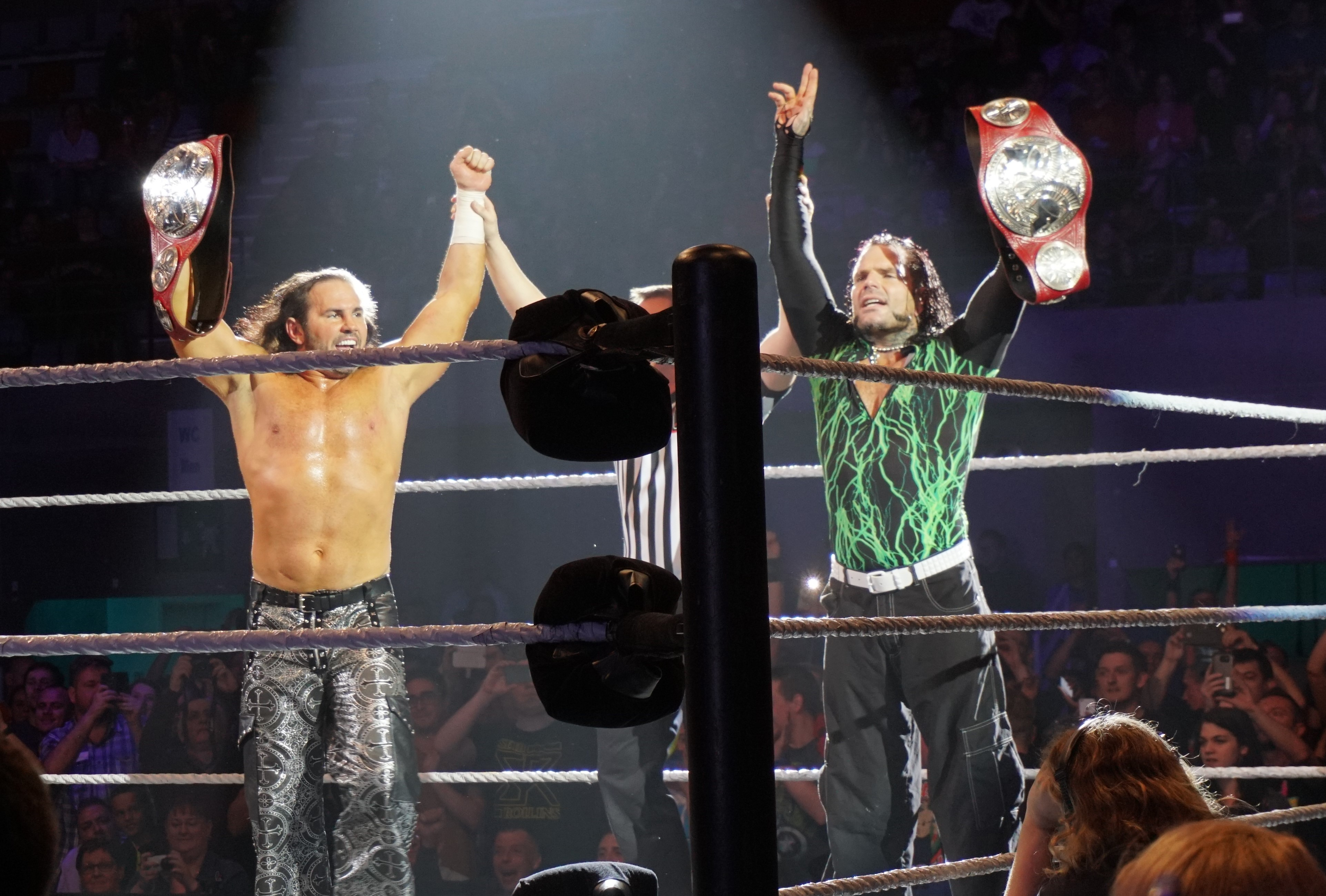
- The Hardy Boyz, Matt (left) and Jeff (right) in 2017.

Tag team
- Name(s): The Broken Hardys; The Woken Hardys; The Hardys; The Hardy Boyz; The Hardy Boys; Immortal; The Jinx Brothers; Los Conquistadores; The New Brood; Team Xtreme (with Lita); The Hardy Brothers
- Members: Jeff Hardy/Brother Nero; Matt Hardy/Broken Matt
- Billed heights: Jeff: 6 ft 2 in (1.88 m); Matt: 6 ft 2 in (1.88 m)
- Combined billed weight: 461 lb (209 kg)
- Billed from: Cameron, North Carolina; The Hardy Compound in Cameron, North Carolina
- Former members: Michael Hayes (manager); Lita
- Debut: July 6, 1995
- Years active: 1995–2002; 2006–2009; 2011−2019; 2022–present

The Hardys, also known as the Hardy Boyz, are an American professional wrestling tag team consisting of brothers Matt Hardy and Jeff Hardy. They are signed to Total Nonstop Action Wrestling (TNA). They are widely regarded as one of the greatest tag teams of all time.

The Hardy brothers began teaming together in 1995 on the independent circuit, where they won the NWA 2000 Tag Team Championship and founded OMEGA Championship Wrestling, capturing the promotion’s tag titles. In 1997, they signed with the World Wrestling Federation (WWF, now WWE). In 2000, they were joined by Lita to form the popular trio known as Team Xtreme. They are the only tag team in history to have held the WWE World Tag Team Championship, WCW Tag Team Championship (in WWE), TNA World Tag Team Championship, ROH World Tag Team Championship, and the Raw, SmackDown, and NXT Tag Team Championships. After disbanding in 2002, the brothers reunited in 2006 and teamed intermittently thereafter. They had a brief reunion in 2011 in Impact Wrestling (then known as TNA) as part of Immortal, and resumed regular tag team activity between 2014 and 2017. Following their departure from Impact in 2017, they returned to WWE, capturing the Raw Tag Team Championship at WrestleMania 33. They later won the SmackDown Tag Team Championship the night after WrestleMania 35 in 2019. Matt’s WWE contract expired in March 2020, marking the end of that run, and he subsequently signed with All Elite Wrestling (AEW). Jeff would also depart WWE in 2021 and joined Matt in AEW in 2022, before both brothers returned to TNA in 2024, and later returned to WWE on the NXT brand in 2025.

Recognized as one of the greatest and most decorated tag teams in professional wrestling, both brothers have also found success in singles competition, with each becoming a multi-time world champion. In 2017, they held seven different tag team titles from seven companies simultaneously—including the ROH World Tag Team Championship and Impact World Tag Team Championship—a feat unmatched in wrestling history. The Hardy Boyz are especially noted for their high-risk, innovative performances in ladder matches and Tables, Ladders, and Chairs matches. They are widely credited with helping to revitalize tag team wrestling during the Attitude Era. In 2012, WWE ranked them number two in its list of the greatest tag teams in history. Collectively, they are 15-time world tag team champions between WWE, TNA, and ROH.

== History ==
=== Early years (1995–1998) ===
The brothers formed a tag team in 1995 after Jeff's debut in the Trampoline Wrestling Federation (TWF). The promotion went by several names, and it was modernized in 1997 as the Organization of Modern Extreme Grappling Arts (OMEGA). The duo worked in several independent promotions throughout North Carolina, holding the OMEGA Tag Team Championship and NWA 2000 Tag Team Championship. They had their first record tag team for Smoky Mountain Wrestling in July 1995.

Their first match as a team in the WWF was against The New Rockers on May 28, 1996 for the June 15 episode of WWF Superstars. Later on they wrestled against Smoking Gunns, Harris Twins, The Headbangers, and Kurrgan in a handicap match.

=== World Wrestling Federation/Entertainment (1998–2009) ===
==== Rise to popularity (1998–1999) ====
After being signed to a contract in 1998, they were trained by Dory Funk, Jr. in his Funkin' Dojo.

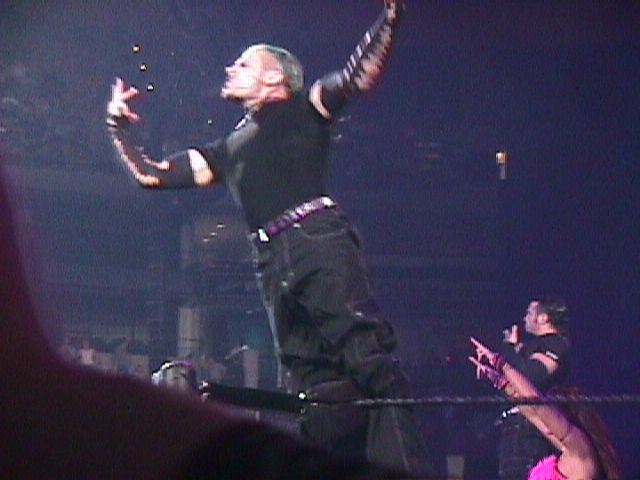
The Hardys with Lita at King of the Ring in June 2000

The Hardy Boyz started their run as a popular tag team with a win over Kaientai (Men's Teioh and Shoichi Funaki) on the September 27 episode of Sunday Night Heat. Soon after their Sunday Night Heat win, they built up a fan base following through their high-flying tag team tactics. They started to become serious contenders for the Tag Team Championship after they became managed by Michael Hayes, formerly a member of The Fabulous Freebirds. On the July 5, 1999 episode of Raw Is War, they defeated The Acolytes (Faarooq and Bradshaw) to win their first WWF Tag Team Championship, but they re-lost the title to The Acolytes a little less than a month later at Fully Loaded on July 25.

They eventually dumped Hayes as their manager in August, becoming villains and briefly associating themselves with Gangrel as part of The New Brood. After winning a series of matches against the team of Edge and Christian—dubbed the Terri Invitational Tournament—they won the services of Terri Runnels as their manager by winning the first ever tag team ladder match at No Mercy on October 17, and then dumped Gangrel the next night becoming faces. The fans also gave both teams a standing ovation the next night on Raw Is War. This began an over two year rivalry between the Hardy Boyz and the team of Edge and Christian. During this time, they also gained notoriety as a faction with Lita.

==== Team Xtreme (2000–2002) ====
With the addition of Lita, Matt and Jeff comprised the trio dubbed Team Xtreme, their name serving as a reflection of their "extreme" high-flying moves. In 2000, they were involved in feuds with Edge and Christian and The Dudley Boyz (Bubba Ray Dudley and D-Von Dudley) in many ladder matches and TLC matches.

They faced Edge and Christian and the Dudley Boyz at WrestleMania 2000 on April 2 in a triple threat tag team ladder match. The Dudley Boyz started the match as the champions and Edge and Christian won the title. The Hardyz faced Edge and Christian for the titles at Insurrextion on May 6 and defeated them by disqualification, which meant that Edge and Christian retained the title. At King of the Ring on June 25, the Hardy Boyz squared off in a Four Corners Elimination match for the Tag Team Championship which included the champions Too Cool (Grandmaster Sexay and Scotty 2 Hotty), T & A (Test and Albert) and Edge and Christian. The Hardyz were able to eliminate T & A before getting eliminated themselves by Edge and Christian.

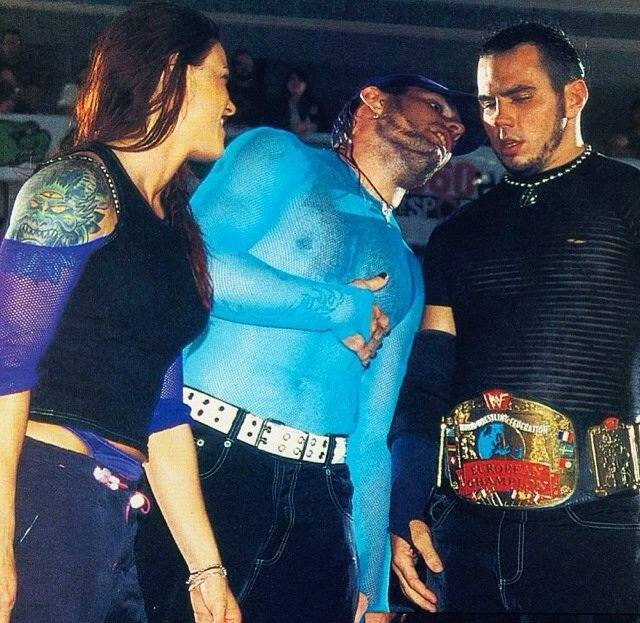
Team Extreme with Matt as European Champion

At SummerSlam on August 27, the Hardy Boyz were defeated in the first ever TLC match for the titles, which Edge and Christian won, and in which the Dudley Boyz also competed. At Unforgiven on September 24, the Hardy Boyz defeated Edge and Christian in a steel cage match to win the titles for a second time. They re-lost the titles to Edge and Christian (who were dressed as Los Conquistadores) at No Mercy on October 22, but they won them back the next night on Raw Is War for a third time. During the match, the Hardy Boyz were dressed as Los Conquistadores, but tore off their masks after the match, revealing themselves. The team lost the titles less than a month later to Right to Censor (Bull Buchanan and The Goodfather) on the November 6 episode of Raw Is War, when Edge and Christian came out and assaulted the Hardyz, allowing Right to Censor to pick up the win and the title.

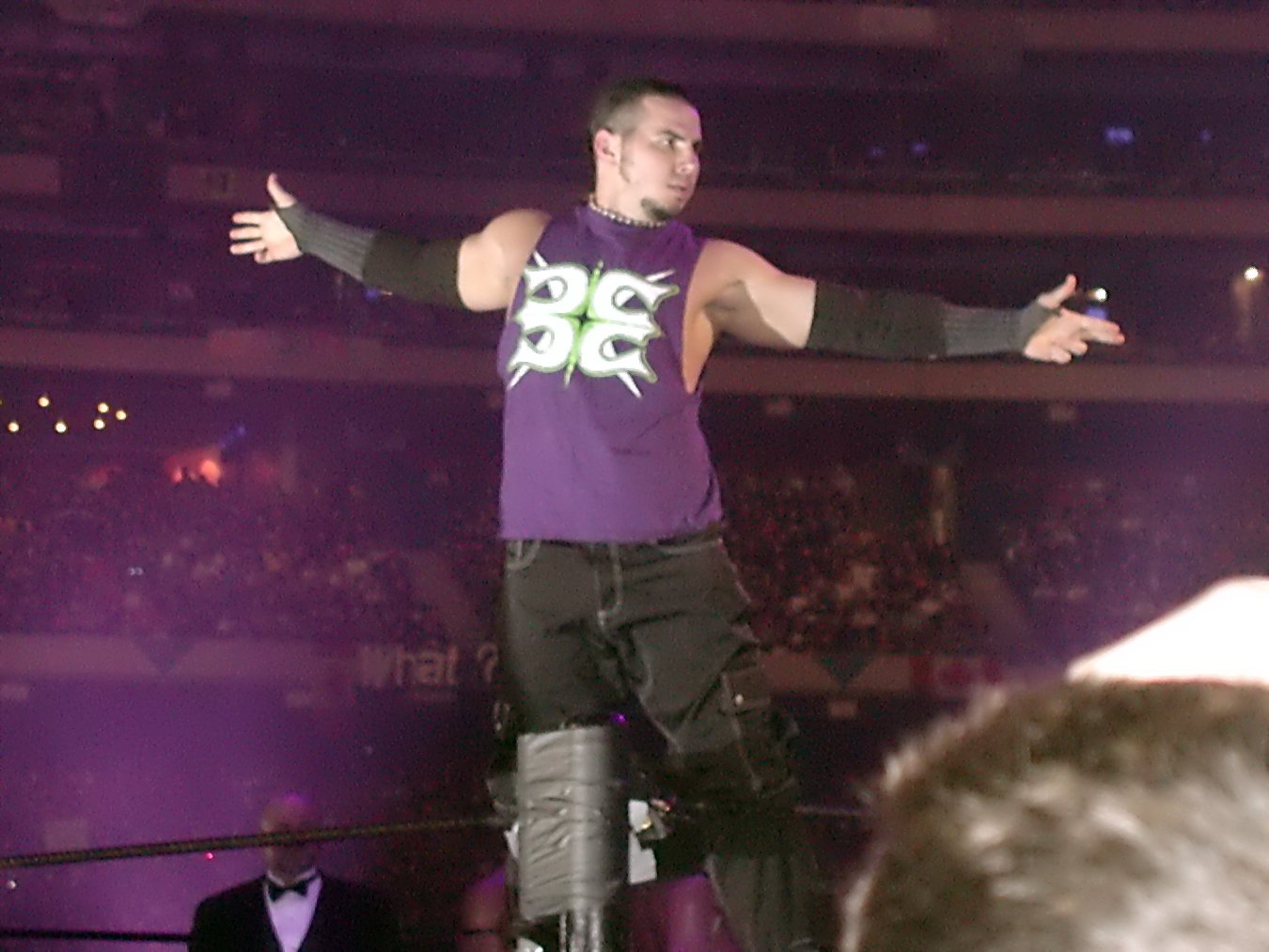
Matt Hardy at WrestleMania X8

The Hardyz became involved in a feud with both Edge and Christian and Right to Censor. At Survivor Series on November 19, the Hardyz along with the Dudleyz defeated Edge and Christian and Right to Censor in a Survivor Series elimination match. At Rebellion on December 2, the Hardy Boyz faced Right to Censor in a rematch for the titles but were unable to win the titles when Val Venis interfered. On the December 4 episode of Raw Is War, Dean Malenko defeated the Hardy Boyz' valet Lita to retain the Light Heavyweight Championship and earn himself a date with her three days later on SmackDown!, when Malenko took Lita on a date and received a beating from the Hardyz. The Hardyz began feuding with Malenko and his friends, The Radicalz (Eddie Guerrero, Chris Benoit, Malenko and Perry Saturn). The two teams faced each other in several tag team and singles matches on Raw Is War and SmackDown!. The two teams also squared off against each other at Armageddon on December 10 with Guerrero, Malenko and Saturn taking on the Hardyz and Lita. The Radicalz won the match.

On the March 5, 2001 episode of Raw Is War, the Hardy Boyz captured their fourth WWF Tag Team Championship when they defeated The Dudley Boyz, after interference from Christian, only to lose the title to Edge and Christian two weeks later on Raw. The next month at WrestleMania X-Seven on April 1, the Hardy Boyz competed in another TLC match against Edge and Christian and the Dudley Boyz. Just as in the first TLC match, Edge and Christian were victorious thanks to help from Rhyno.

On the October 8 episode of Raw, the Hardy Boyz won the WCW Tag Team Championship from Booker T and Test. They lost the title to the Dudley Boyz two weeks later on SmackDown!. On the November 12 episode of Raw, they beat Booker T and Test again, but this time for the WWF Tag Team Championship. At Survivor Series on November 18, they lost the title to the Dudley Boyz in a steel cage title unification match. This defeat led to a break up storyline that resulted in a match between the brothers at Vengeance on December 9. Jeff would emerge victorious after Lita, who was the special referee, failed to see Matt's foot on the rope. The storyline was dropped in January 2002 and they reunited.

At No Way Out on February 17, the Hardy Boyz participated in a tag team turmoil match which was won by the APA. At WrestleMania X8 on March 17, along with the APA and the Dudley Boyz, the Hardyz challenged Billy and Chuck for the WWF Tag Team Championship in a four corners elimination match. The APA were eliminated by the Dudleyz, whom the Hardy Boyz managed to eliminate. In the end, they were pinned by the champions, therefore losing the opportunity. They then began a feud with the newcomer Brock Lesnar and his manager Paul Heyman. At Judgment Day on May 19, the Hardy Boyz lost to Lesnar and Heyman in a tag team match.

==== Split and departure (2002–2005) ====
The duo split up afterward as Jeff began a storyline with The Undertaker, while Matt was relegated to working on Heat. In the storyline, Matt then attacked Jeff due to jealousy of Jeff getting opportunities, including a match for the Intercontinental Championship. Matt was then moved to the SmackDown! brand, where he dubbed himself "Matt Hardy Version 1" and the "Sensei of Mattitude" and picked up real-life friend Shannon Moore and briefly Crash Holly as followers. He later won the Cruiserweight Championship from Billy Kidman at No Way Out on February 23, 2003. Jeff was released from WWE on April 22 for erratic behavior, drug use, refusal to go to rehab and deteriorating ring performance as well as constant tardiness and no-showing events.

Following his release from WWE, Jeff debuted in Total Nonstop Action Wrestling (TNA) in mid-2004. After no-showing several events, he was suspended in 2006 before leaving the company soon afterward. Meanwhile, in April 2005, Matt was released from WWE due to unprofessional conduct with social media after discovering Lita had a real-life affair with Edge. He was rehired just a few months later, feuded with Edge, and was eventually sent to the SmackDown! brand.

==== The Hardys reunion (2006–2007) ====
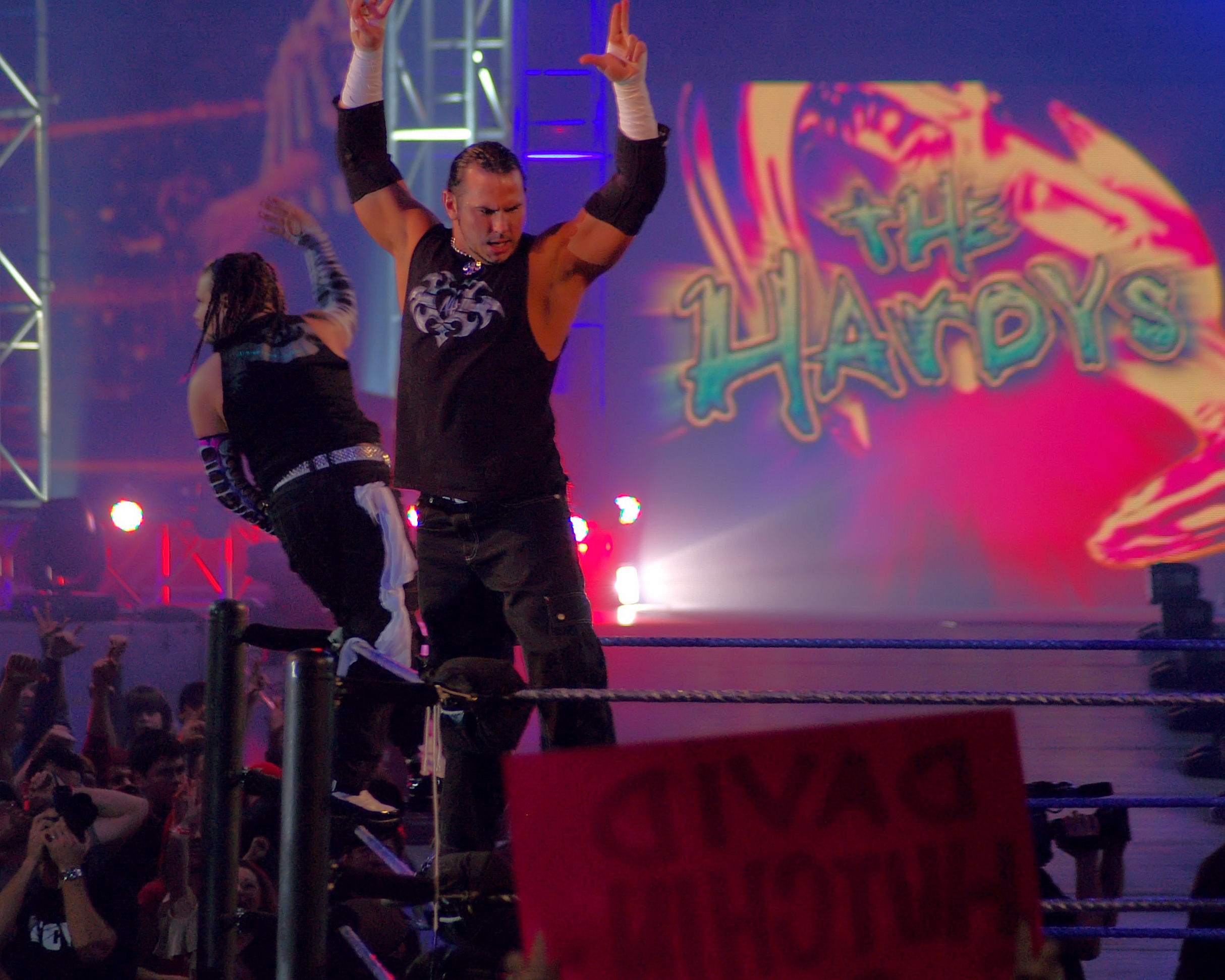
The Hardys during their ring entrance at December to Dismember in December 2006

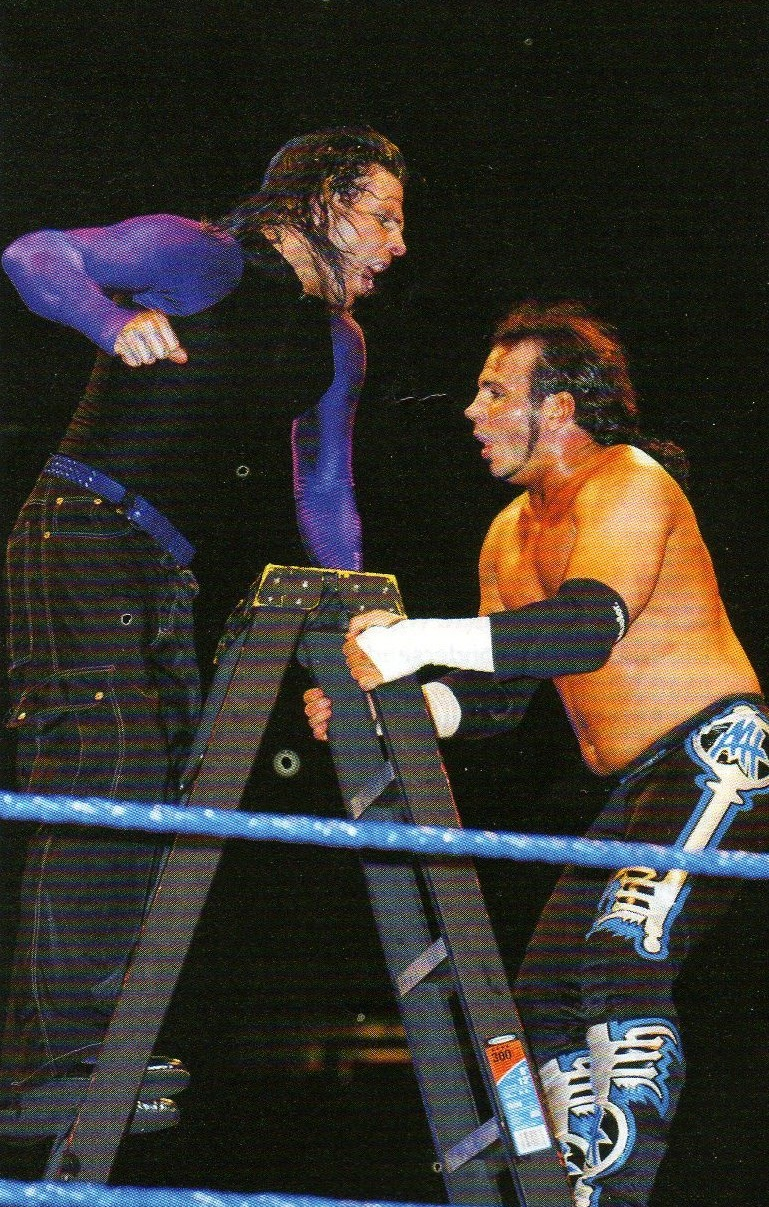
The Hardys battle each other in 2009

On August 4, 2006, Jeff rejoined WWE on its Raw brand. In November, it was announced on WWE's official website that Matt and Jeff would team up for the first time together in over four years as members of Team DX at Survivor Series on November 26. The Hardys, as they were now known, were first given a "warm up match" on the November 21 episode of ECW on Sci Fi, defeating The Full Blooded Italians (Little Guido Maritato and Tony Mamaluke). At Survivor Series, Team DX defeated Team Rated-RKO in a clean sweep.

On the November 27 episode of Raw, The Hardys had their first shot at Tag Team gold in five years. They took on World Tag Team Champions Rated-RKO (Edge and Randy Orton), but came up short when Edge hit Jeff in the back with a belt to get himself and Orton deliberately disqualified to retain the title. That same day, The Hardys posed an open challenge to any team for ECW brand's December to Dismember on December 3 which was immediately accepted by a reuniting MNM (Johnny Nitro and Joey Mercury). After a run in on the intervening ECW on Sci Fi, The Hardys defeated MNM at the event, starting a feud between all four men that spanned both brands. The Hardys got their first chance to gain the WWE Tag Team Championship at Armageddon on December 17, where the original tag team match was changed to a four team ladder match involving The Hardys, MNM, Dave Taylor and William Regal, and Paul London and Brian Kendrick. Despite coming up short, The Hardys sparked another feud with MNM when Mercury was legitimately injured. While Jeff and Nitro continued battling over the Intercontinental Championship on Raw, Matt and Mercury feuded on SmackDown!. Mercury and Nitro tried injuring both Hardys' faces as payback for what happened at Armageddon, claiming that The Hardys had ruined Mercury's 'Hollywood good looks'. The Hardys settled their feud with MNM at the Royal Rumble on January 28, 2007 when they defeated them for the second time. Matt and Mercury continued feuding, however, which was finally settled at No Way Out on February 18, in which the Hardys teamed with Chris Benoit to defeat MNM and Montel Vontavious Porter (MVP).

On the April 2 episode of Raw, the Hardys won the World Tag Team Championship for the sixth time in their career after winning a ten team battle royal. After losing singles bouts to both Lance Cade and Trevor Murdoch, The Hardys retained their World Tag Team Championship at both Backlash on April 29 and Judgment Day on May 20 against the team of Cade and Murdoch. At One Night Stand on June 3, the Hardys retained the titles against The World's Greatest Tag Team (Charlie Haas and Shelton Benjamin) in a ladder match. The next night on Raw, however, the Hardys lost their championship to Cade and Murdoch, when Jeff missed a Swanton Bomb and was pinned by Cade after Murdoch pushed his foot off of the bottom rope of the ring. Cade and Murdoch attacked the Hardys with the championship belts after the match. The Hardys got a rematch at Vengeance on June 24, but was unsuccessful after Jeff was hit with a sitout spinebuster from Cade.

The Hardys once again returned to WWE on the November 13 episode of ECW to face Montel Vontavious Porter (MVP) and Mr. Kennedy, a match that was originally scheduled for the November 16 episode of SmackDown!. The Hardys were unsuccessful in their return as MVP pinned Jeff for the win. The Hardys, announced and referred to once again as the Hardy Boyz, reunited once again in 2008, on the June 23 episode of Raw in a losing effort to John Morrison and The Miz. The match occurred after Jeff was drafted to the SmackDown brand (the same brand as Matt). This loss, however, caused Matt to be drafted to the ECW brand. On the July 15 episode of ECW, The Hardys reunited in their home state of North Carolina, defeating Morrison and Miz. The Hardys then teamed up on the October 31 episode of SmackDown and on November 3 on Raw, winning both matches.

==== Feud and second departure (2009) ====
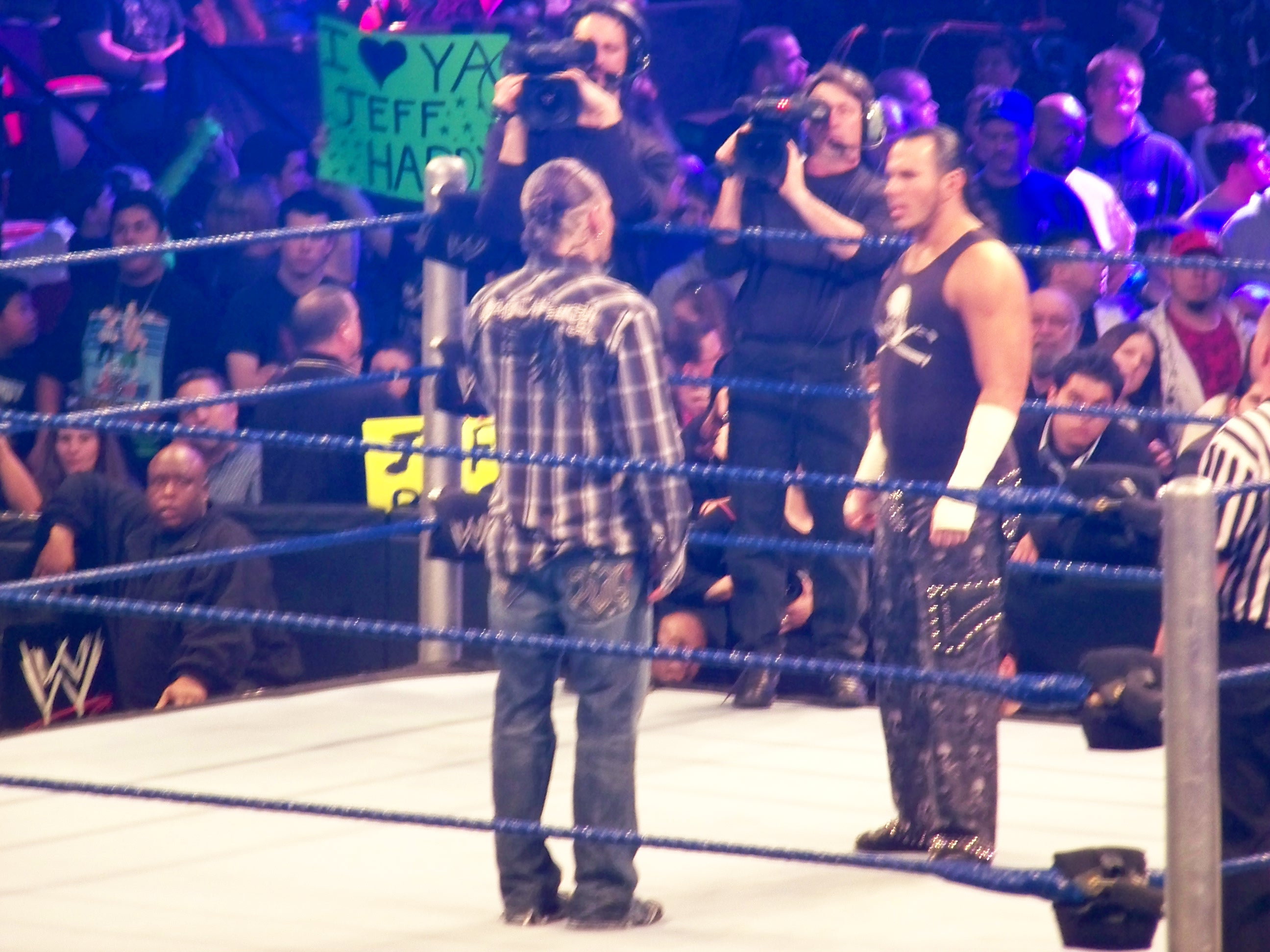
Jeff (left) and Matt (right) arguing in the ring in February 2009

The Hardy Boyz kickstarted 2009 with a win over Edge and Big Show on the January 2 episode of SmackDown. This was the last match for the then WWE Champion and ECW Champion as a team as Matt would lose the ECW championship to Jack Swagger on the January 13 episode of ECW. Heading into the Royal Rumble on January 25, Matt was attempting to regain the ECW Championship from Jack Swagger while Jeff held the WWE Championship. After Matt lost to Swagger, he interfered in Jeff's match with Edge, hitting Jeff with a steel chair and allowing Edge to win the WWE Championship. On the January 30 episode of SmackDown, Matt announced the permanent disbandment of the tag team due to the events at the Royal Rumble and that he no longer considered Jeff as his partner or brother. Matt moved to the SmackDown brand and began a scripted rivalry with Jeff. The pair faced each other in an Extreme Rules match at WrestleMania 25 on April 5, which Matt won. They later faced each other in a stretcher match on the April 10 episode of SmackDown, in which Matt gained his second win over Jeff. As part of the 2009 WWE draft, Matt was drafted to the Raw brand on the April 13 episode of Raw. Despite this, the brothers faced each other in an "I Quit" match at Backlash on April 26, which Jeff won. Matt also interfered in Jeff's World Heavyweight Championship match against Edge at Judgment Day on May 17, preventing him from winning the championship.

On the August 21 episode of SmackDown, Jeff (then the World Heavyweight Champion) and Matt reunited as the Hardys and teamed with John Morrison in a six-man tag team match to defeat CM Punk and The Hart Dynasty. The following week, Jeff lost a "Loser Leaves the WWE" steel cage match to CM Punk, resulting in him leaving the company. Over a year later, on October 15, 2010, Matt requested and was granted his release from his contract with WWE.

=== Total Nonstop Action Wrestling (2010–2017) ===
==== Immortal (2010–2011) ====
Jeff made his TNA return on the January 4, 2010 episode of Impact!, and went on to win the TNA World Heavyweight Championship at Bound for Glory on October 10 with help from Hulk Hogan and Eric Bischoff, revealing that they and others had formed the Immortal faction. On January 9, 2011, at TNA's pay-per-view Genesis, Matt made his TNA debut as a surprise member of Immortal, and defeated Rob Van Dam. Jeff went on to lose the TNA World Heavyweight Championship to Mr. Anderson later that night. On the January 13 episode of Impact! the Hardy Brothers reunited, as heels for the first time since 1999, and defeated Van Dam and Anderson. Following the Victory Road pay-per-view on March 13, Immortal severed their ties with Jeff. On August 20, Matt was released from TNA after being arrested for driving while intoxicated.

==== TNA World Tag Team Champions (2014–2015) ====
Matt returned to TNA in mid-2014. On June 26, at Destination X The Hardys unsuccessfully challenged The Wolves (Davey Richards and Eddie Edwards) for the TNA World Tag Team Championship. On the August 14 episode of Impact Wrestling, The Hardys were defeated by Team 3D (the former Dudley Boyz). At the Hardcore Justice edition of Impact Wrestling, The Hardys and Team 3D challenged The Wolves to a three-way for the TNA World Tag Team Championship, to which they agreed. Kurt Angle later announced that all three teams would compete in a best of three series for the title with the winners of the first match being able to choose the stipulation of the next one. Team 3D won the first match and chose a Tables match, The Hardys won the second match and chose a ladder match, and The Wolves won the third match on the No Surrender episode of Impact Wrestling, tying them all at one win each. A final match to decide the series took place, and was won by The Wolves. In October, The Hardys participated in a tournament to determine the number one contender to the TNA World Tag Team Championship; they defeated The BroMans (Jessie Godderz and DJ Z), Ethan Carter III and Tyrus, and Samoa Joe and Low Ki to win the tournament. On February 6, 2015, at Lockdown, The Hardys unsuccessfully challenged The Revolution for the TNA World Tag Team Championship in a Six Sides of Steel match.

After The Wolves vacated the tag team championship due to an injury to Eddie Edwards, an Ultimate X match was held for the title at the March 16 Impact Wrestling tapings. The Hardys defeated Kenny King and Low Ki, Ethan Carter III and Bram, and Rockstar Spud and Mr. Anderson to win the match and the title. However, The Hardys vacated the titles due to Jeff's broken tibia.

==== The Broken Hardyz (2016–2017) ====
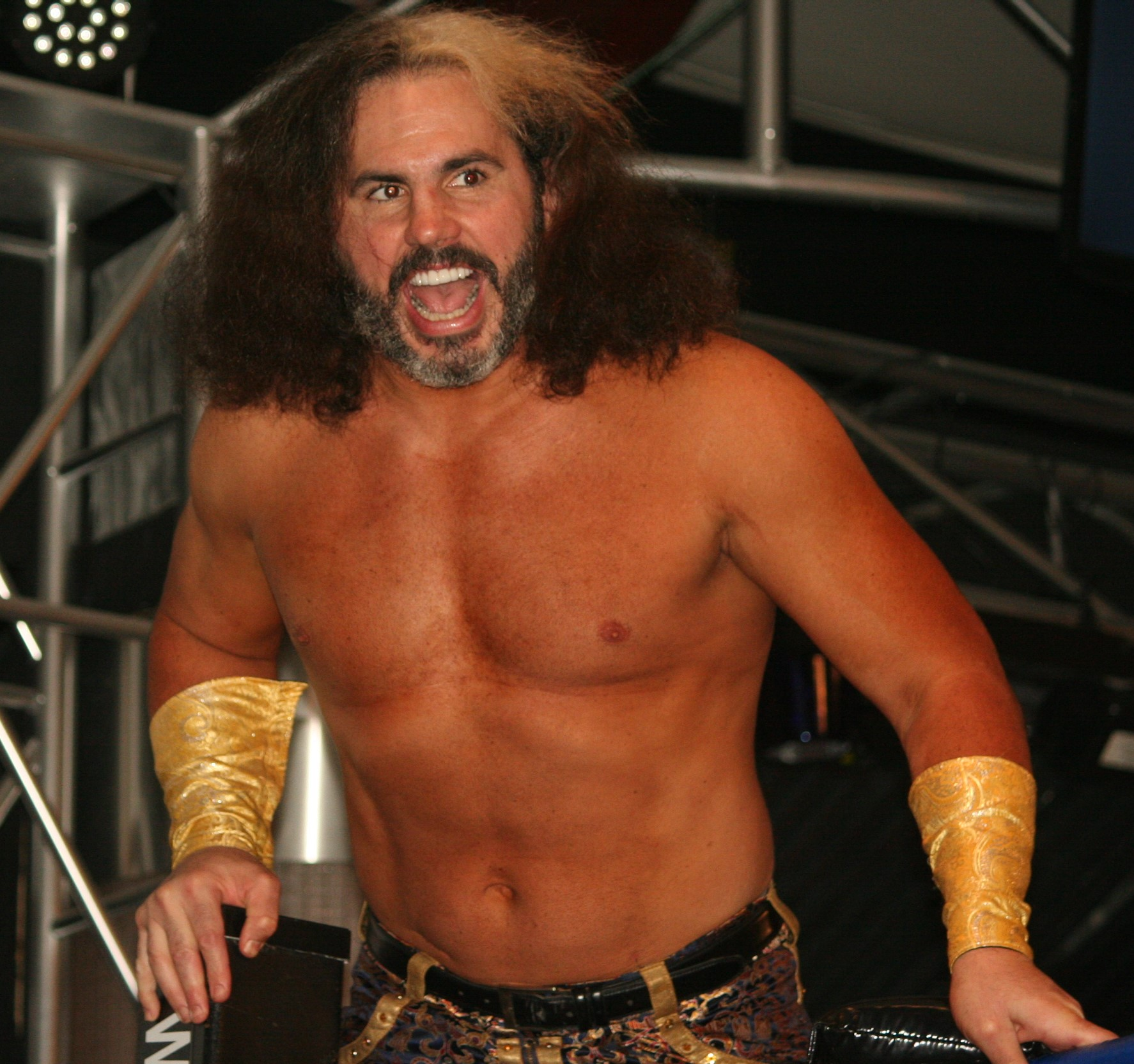
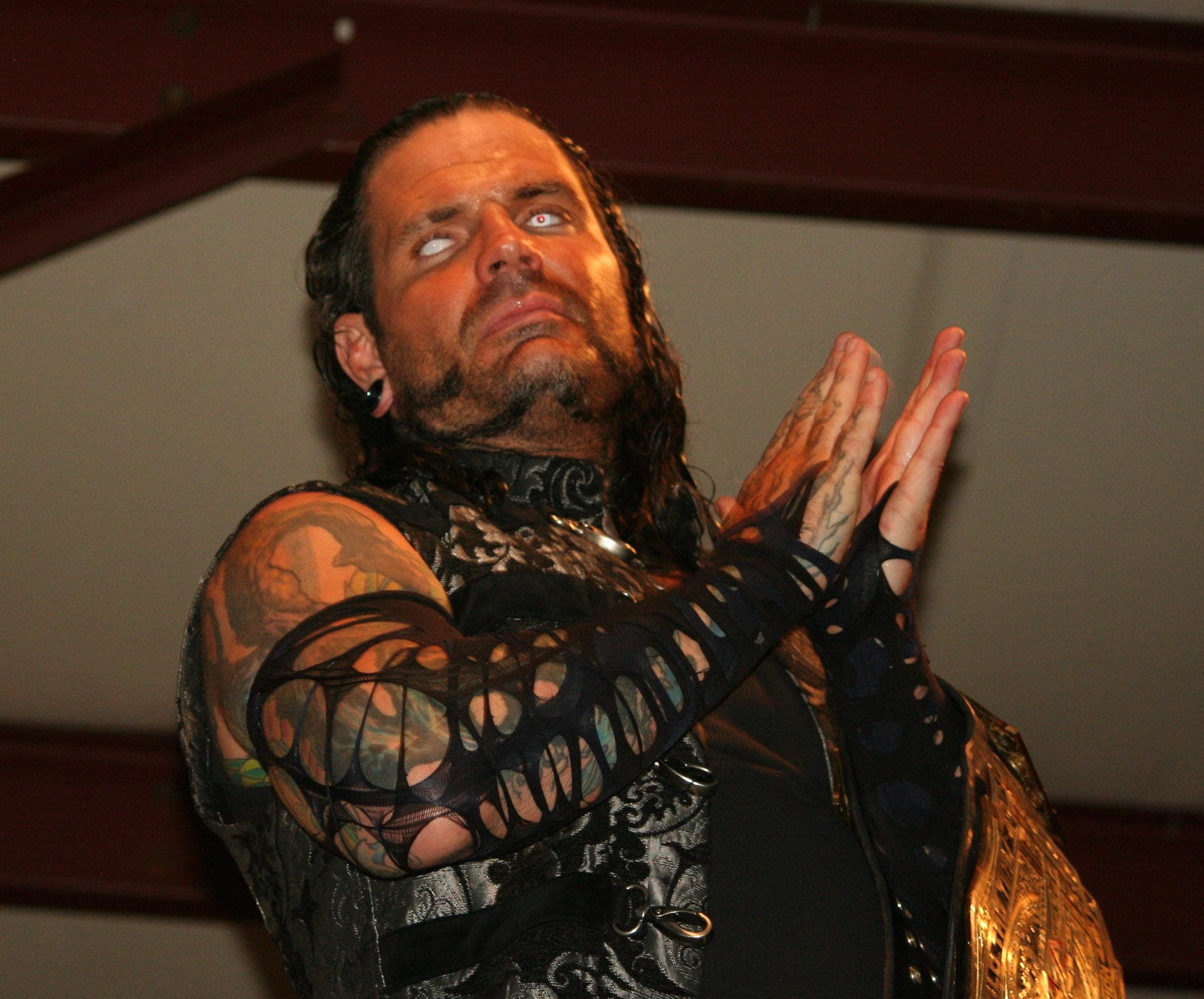
Matt as "Broken Matt" (left) and Jeff as "Brother Nero" (right)

On the August 4 episode of Impact Wrestling, after a lengthy feud involving the "Deletion" of Jeff Hardy, Broken Matt sent Jeff, (at the time referred to as Brother Nero), on a quest to procure the Impact Wrestling World Tag Team Championship for him. On the August 18 episode of Impact Wrestling, Broken Matt and Brother Nero defeated The BroMans, The Tribunal, and The Helms Dynasty in an "Ascension to Hell" fatal four-way number one contender's ladder match for an opportunity to challenge Decay for the TNA World Tag Team Championships at Bound for Glory. Broken Matt climbed the ladder and grabbed the contract, following Nero sacrificing himself by jumping off the ladder and onto Trevor Lee. On the September 1 episode of Impact Wrestling, the Hardys invited Decay to come to their hometown compound, plotting for a sequel to "The Final Deletion" (dubbed as "Delete or Decay"). Broken Matt turned babyface during this encounter when King Maxel was almost kidnapped by Decay and when Brother Nero took a hit from Abyss' spiked bat, and Broken Matt healed him via the Lake of Restoration.

On October 2 at TNA Bound for Glory they defeated Decay to become two time TNA World Tag Team Champions. On the October 6 episode of Impact Wrestling, they retained their titles against Decay in a Wolf Creek match. On the October 13 episode of Impact Wrestling, they were attacked by The Tribunal. The Hardys would then face The Tribunal one week later, on October 20's broadcast where they were able to successfully defend their titles. However, after the match as they returned to the dressing rooms, the arena went dark, signalling the arrival of a new faction, dubbed the DCC. The DCC would use the darkness to attack and layout The Tribunal as The Hardys looked on from the ramp, thus potentially building an upcoming rivalry in weeks to comes. On February 27, 2017, The Hardys announced their departure from TNA after negotiations of a new contract fell through. Though they offered to return to drop the belts at the next tapings, TNA’s parent company Anthem declined.

=== Expedition of Gold (2014–2017) ===
The Hardy brothers reunited for the first time in three years at OMEGA Chaos in Cameron on April 26, 2014, defeating the Briscoe Brothers in a highly-rated first time ever match between the teams. They also had a critically acclaimed trilogy with The Young Bucks in 2014; the Hardys won the first two matchups at Northeast Wrestling (NEW), while The Young Bucks won the third match at House of Hardcore VII. They continued to team sporadically on the independent circuit.

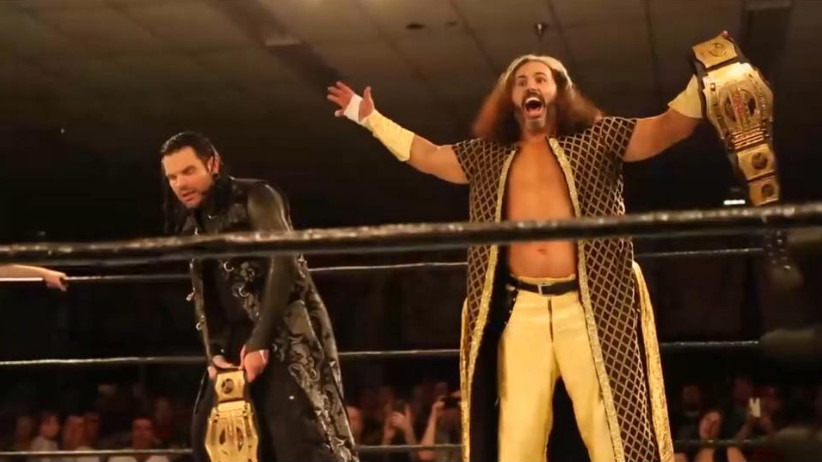
The Broken Hardys at an MCW show

In late 2016 and early 2017, while still carrying the TNA World Tag Team Championship, they embarked on what they referred to as the Expedition of Gold — a tour across independent and international promotions, showcased on Impact Wrestling, as they sought to win additional tag team championships to establish themselves as "the greatest tag team in all of space and time." During this phase they captured tag titles in multiple promotions: Mexico’s The Crash, West Virginia’s All Star Wrestling, Maryland’s MCW Pro Wrestling, their own OMEGA Championship Wrestling, and Chile’s Wrestling Superstar, with some title victories even aired on Impact Wrestling broadcasts.

Their TNA contracts officially expired on February 27, 2017. However, since television had been pre-taped, they continued to be recognized on Impact as TNA Tag Team Champions. They offered to drop the belts at the next tapings, but TNA’s parent company Anthem declined. On the March 3 taping (aired March 16), Impact Wrestling formally vacated the tag titles.

On March 4, 2017, the Hardys debuted for Ring of Honor (ROH) at Manhattan Mayhem VI, defeating The Young Bucks to win the ROH World Tag Team Championship. Since Impact had not yet aired the storyline of vacating the TNA titles, they were at that moment recognized simultaneously as TNA and ROH champions—a unique occurrence in tag team history. They lost the ROH belts back to The Young Bucks in a ladder match at Supercard of Honor XI on April 1, 2017. Following the loss, it was announced that their ROH contracts had also expired.

=== Return to WWE (2017–2019) ===
On April 2 at, WrestleMania 33, The Hardy Boyz made an unannounced return to WWE, after hosts The New Day (Big E, Kofi Kingston and Xavier Woods) announced that the triple threat ladder match for the Raw Tag Team Championship which had been set by WWE before the event was now going to be a Fatal four-way match. They then began jokingly questioning the arena about who the mystery team could be, before the Hardy Boyz's made their entrance to the stage to a massive ovation from the crowd. At the event, The Hardy Boyz won the Raw Tag Team Championship, defeating the teams of Enzo Amore and Big Cass, Cesaro and Sheamus, and then-reigning champions Luke Gallows and Karl Anderson. The night after WrestleMania on Raw, they successfully defended the Raw Tag Team Championship against Luke Gallows and Karl Anderson. Afterwards on Raw Talk, Matt mentioned that the Hardy Boyz had successfully completed the Expedition of Gold after winning the Raw Tag Team Championship. They would retain the titles at Payback against Sheamus and Cesaro, but lost them at Extreme Rules in a steel cage match, and failed to regain it at the inaugural Great Balls of Fire event.

In September, Jeff suffered a torn rotator cuff and would be out of action for four to six months, leaving Matt to begin a run as a singles competitor and teamed up with Bray Wyatt as Deleters of the World. However, two years later, on the February 26, 2019 episode of SmackDown Live, the Hardy Boyz reunited and, on the April 9 episode of SmackDown, defeated The Usos to win the SmackDown Tag Team Championships. With this, they became the first team to win all three of WWE's world tag team championships (World, Raw, and SmackDown). However, they vacated the WWE Smackdown Tag Team Championships due to Jeff suffering a leg injury from Lars Sullivan. While Jeff was recovering, Matt was featured less on WWE television until he left WWE on March 2, 2020. and he went on to sign with All Elite Wrestling. Jeff went on to become a singles competitor before being released from the WWE on December 9, 2021.

=== All Elite Wrestling (2022–2024) ===
Matt announced on Twitter that he and Jeff would be reuniting for their 'Final Run' and wrestling a match in Big Time Wrestling (BTW). They would be facing the winner of a match between The Briscoes and The S.A.T.

Jeff debuted for AEW on the March 9, 2022 episode of AEW Dynamite, reuniting the brothers for the first time in over two years. On the March 16, 2022 episode of Dynamite, Matt and Jeff, billed as "The Hardys", wrestled in their first ever AEW match, defeating Private Party.

On April 30, 2022 in Rostraver, PA, the brothers wrestled against The Mane Event (TME) for the IWC Tag Team Championship, and successfully captured their first tag team titles in three years.

On May 29, 2022, during a successful bout the Hardys had at the AEW Double or Nothing PPV against The Young Bucks, Jeff Hardy suffered a "terrible" concussion-like injury which, according to Matt Hardy, left him "almost knocked out." On June 14, 2022, AEW owner Tony Khan would suspend Jeff Hardy indefinitely from AEW the day following his arrest for DUI, driving with a suspended license and violating a restriction that required him to keep an Ignition Interlock Device — a handheld breathalyzer that prevents users from starting their vehicle after drinking alcohol — in his car. Khan also announced that Jeff's AEW suspension would only be lifted "upon successfully completing treatment and maintaining his sobriety.” During the April 12, 2023 episode of Dynamite, Jeff Hardy returned to assist his brother during an assault thus reuniting the team. On April 8, 2024, it was reported that Matt's contract had expired and decided not to renew, effectively disbanding the team. Two months later, Jeff also departed from AEW after his contract expired.

=== Return to TNA (2024–present) ===
Matt made his surprise return to TNA on April 20, 2024 at Rebellion, reverting back to his "Broken" gimmick and attacking TNA World Champion Moose. On June 14 at Against All Odds, Matt unsuccessfully challenged Moose for the championship. After the match, Jeff made his surprise return to TNA to come to Matt's aid from a post-match attack from Moose. On October 26, 2024, the Hardys won their third TNA World Tag Team Championship by defeating previous champions The System (Eddie Edwards and Brian Myers), and ABC (Ace Austin and Chris Bey) at Bound for Glory in a Full Metal Mayhem match to win the titles.

The Hardys would later lose their TNA World Tag Team Championships to the Nemeths the following year at Rebellion, only to regain them at Slammiversary in a four-way tag team ladder match also involving The Rascalz (Myron Reed and Zachary Wentz) and Fir$t Cla$$ (A. J. Francis and KC Navarro). At Bound for Glory on October 12, Hardys retained the TNA and NXT Tag Team Championship against Team 3D (Bully Ray and Devon) in a tables match, where it was a retirement match for Team 3D.

On April 11, 2026, at Rebellion, The Hardys lost the TNA World Tag Team Championship to The System (Brian Myers and Bear Bronson), before regaining the titles at Slammiversary in a four-way tag team ladder match that also featured The Righteous (Vincent and Dutch) and The Great Hands (John Skyler and Jason Hotch). They lost the titles once again to The Nemeths on August 23 at Lockdown in a Steel Cage tornado tag team match.

=== Second return to WWE (2025) ===
While still contracted to TNA, the Hardy Boyz made a return appearance with WWE during the February 25, 2025, episode of NXT. At NXT: Roadblock on March 11, The Hardy Boyz successfully defended the TNA World Tag Team Championship against NXT Tag Team Champions Nathan Frazer and Axiom. At NXT vs. TNA Showdown on October 7, the Hardy Boyz defeated DarkState (Dion Lennox and Osiris Griffin) in a Winners Take All match to win the NXT Tag Team Championship. As such, the Hardy Boyz achieved several records, becoming the first contracted TNA wrestlers to win a WWE title, the fourth team to complete the WWE Tag Team Triple Crown, and the first team to complete the WWE Tag Team Triple Crown while not being under contract with WWE, as well as being the only tag team to win a WWE tag team championship in four different decades. At Halloween Havoc on October 25, the Hardys, competing under their "Broken" gimmicks, lost the NXT Tag Team Championship back to DarkState in a Broken Rules match, ending their reign at 18 days.

== Other media ==
The Hardys appeared on the February 7, 1999 episode of That '70s Show entitled "That Wrestling Show", as uncredited wrestlers. Jeff and Matt, along with Lita, also appeared on Tough Enough in early 2001, talking and wrestling with the contestants. They both appeared on the February 25, 2002 episode of Fear Factor competing against four other WWF wrestlers. Jeff was eliminated in the first round, but Matt became the eventual winner, winning $50,000 for the American Cancer Society.

In 2001, the Hardys and Lita appeared in Rolling Stone magazine's 2001 Sports Hall of Fame issue. In 2003, Jeff and Matt, with the help of Michael Krugman, wrote and published their autobiography The Hardy Boyz: Exist 2 Inspire. As part of WWE, the Hardys appeared in the DVD, The Hardy Boyz: Leap of Faith in 2001. On April 29, 2008, WWE released Twist of Fate: The Matt and Jeff Hardy Story. The DVD features footage of the brothers in OMEGA and WWE, and it also briefly mentions Jeff's initial stint in TNA. The brothers also appear on The Hardy Show, an internet web show which features the Hardys, Shannon Moore, and many of their friends.

== Video games ==
WWE video games
Year	Title	Notes
1999	WWF WrestleMania 2000	Video game debut
2000	WWF Smackdown!	
2000	WWF Royal Rumble	
2000	WWF No Mercy	
2000	WWF SmackDown! 2: Know Your Role	
2001	WWF With Authority!	
2001	WWF Road to WrestleMania	
2001	WWF SmackDown! Just Bring It	
2002	WWF Raw	
2002	WWE WrestleMania X8	
2002	WWE SmackDown! Shut Your Mouth	
2007	WWE SmackDown vs. Raw 2008	
2008	WWE SmackDown vs. Raw 2009	
2009	WWE SmackDown vs. Raw 2010	
2017	WWE 2K18	Downloadable content
2018	WWE 2K19	
2019	WWE 2K20	
2026	WWE 2K26	Downloadable Content

AEW Video games
Year	Title	Notes
2023	AEW Fight Forever	Video game debut

== Championships and accomplishments ==
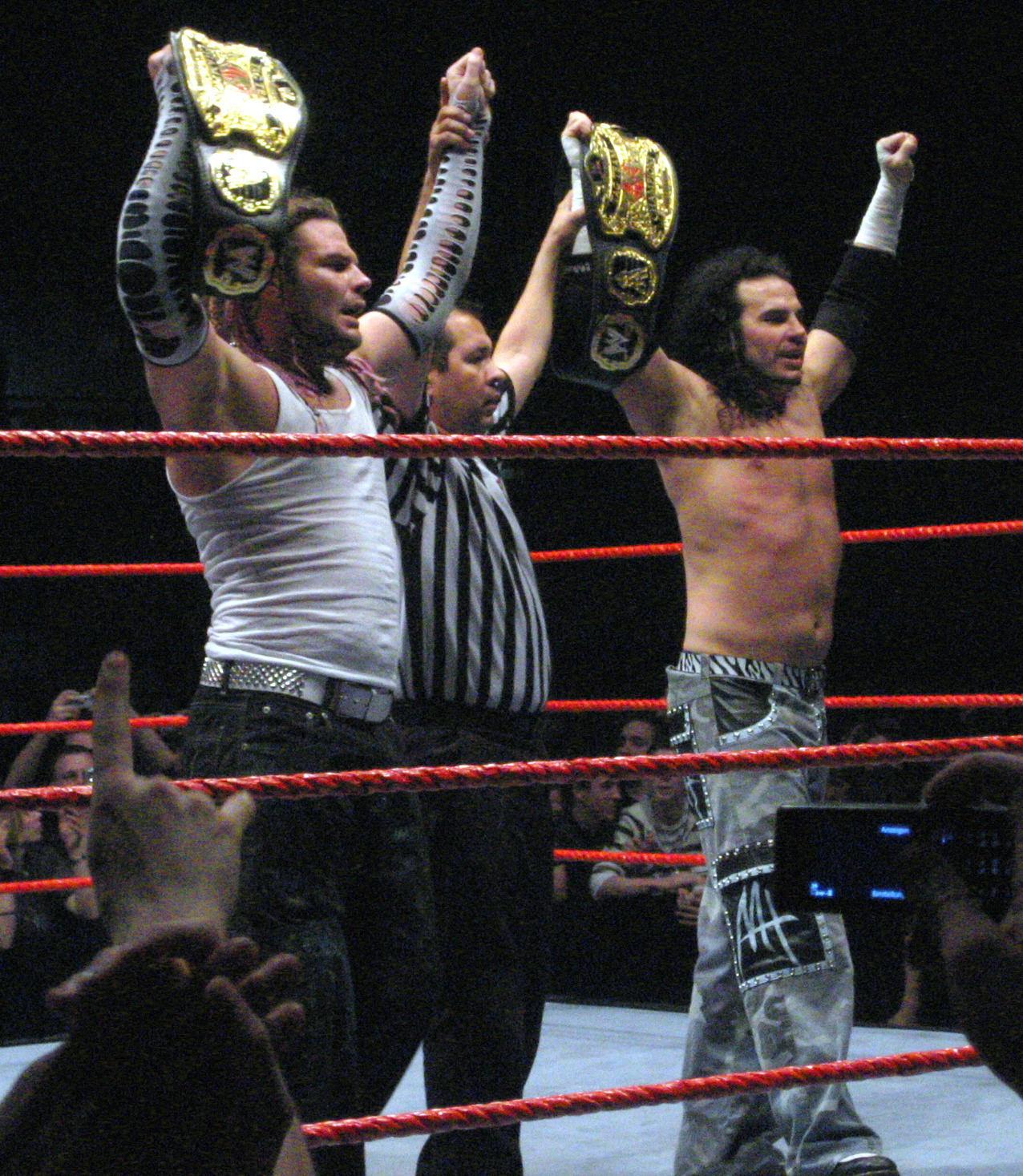
Among the numerous tag team titles the Hardys have held include six World Tag Team Championships...

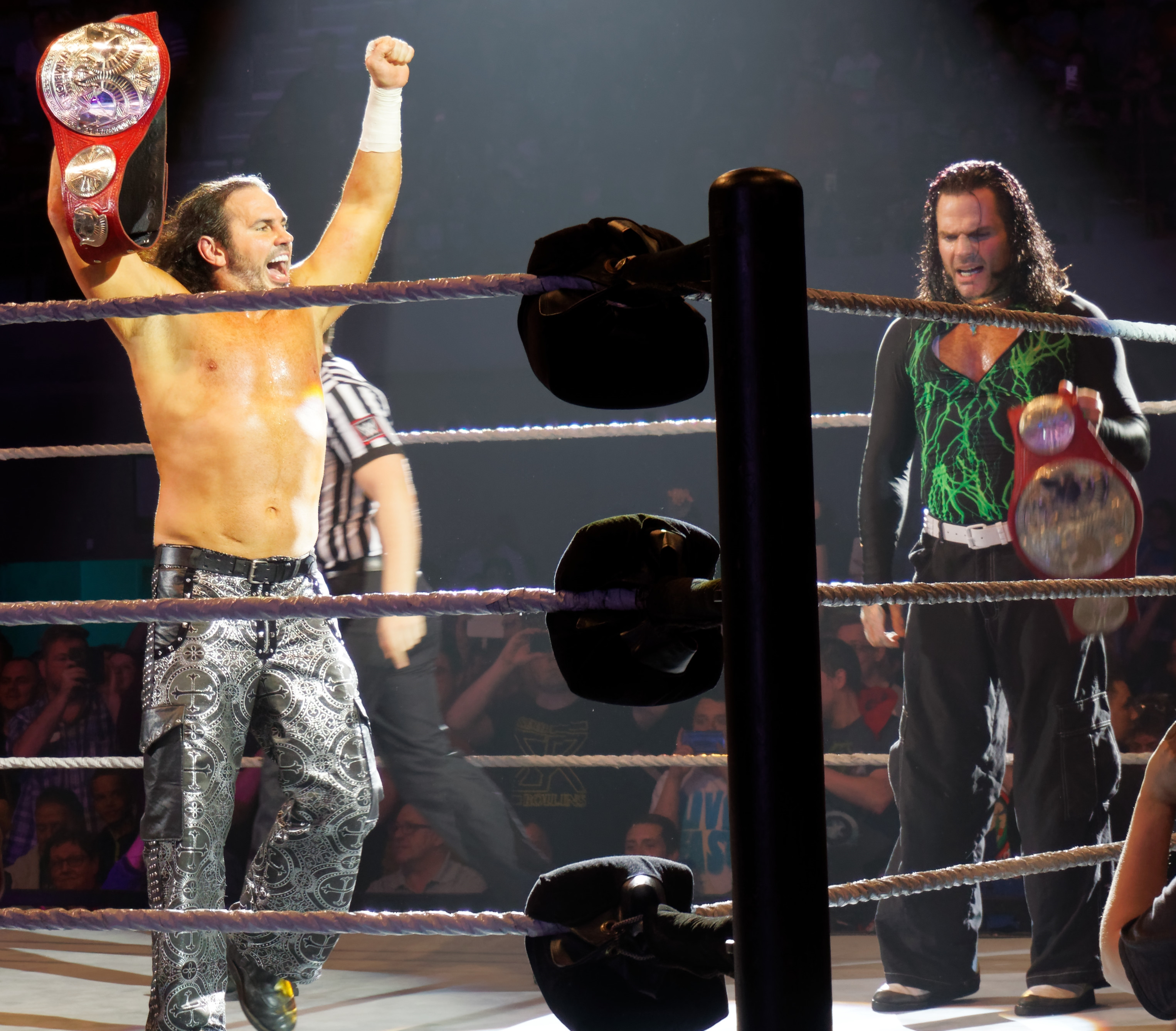
...one Raw Tag Team Championship...

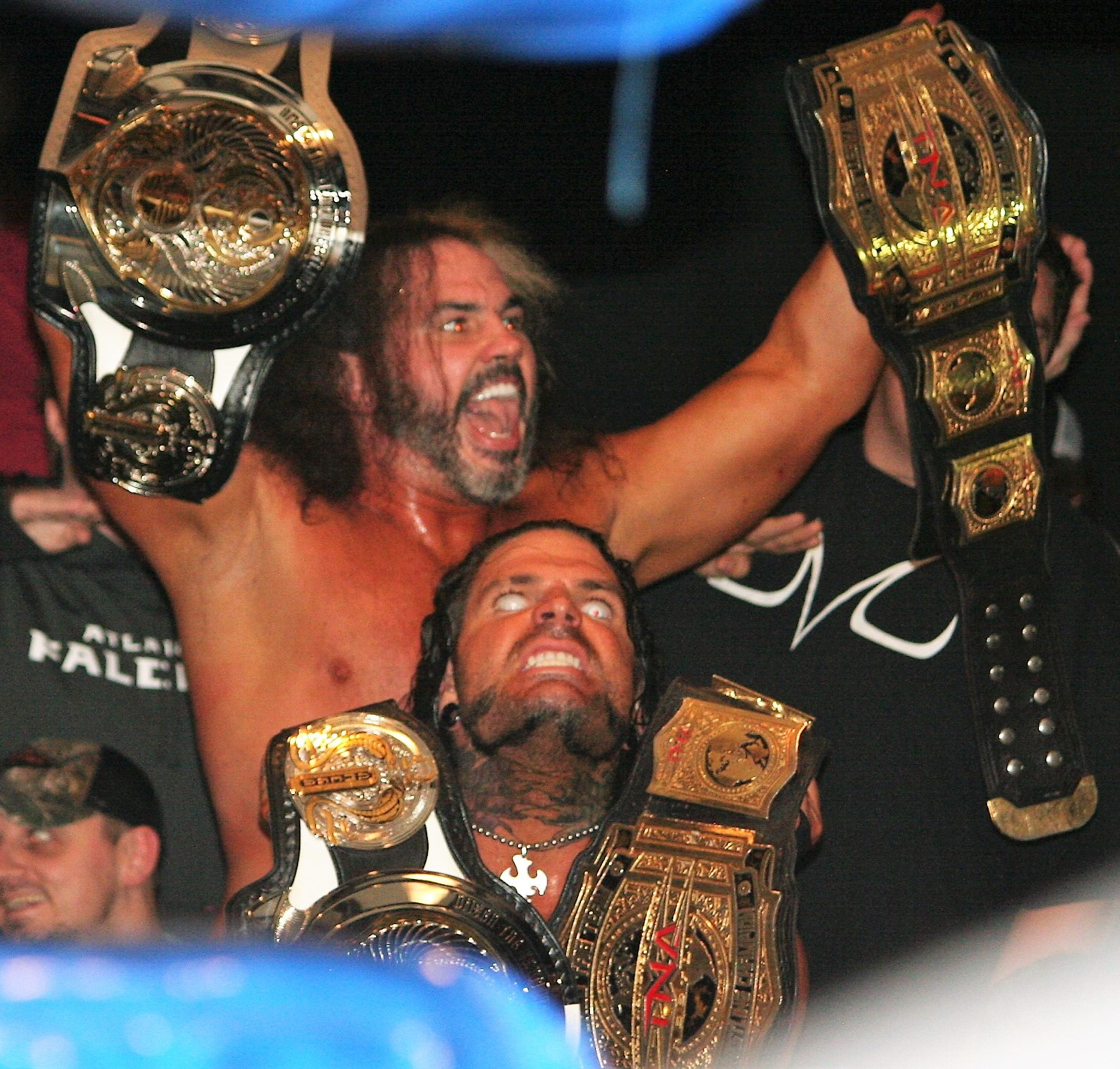
...two OMEGA Tag Team Championships (left), and five TNA World Tag Team Championships (right)

- 4th Rope Wrestling
  - 4th Rope Tag Team Championship (1 time, inaugural)
- All Star Wrestling (West Virginia)
  - ASW Tag Team Championship (1 time)
- The Crash
  - The Crash Tag Team Championship (1 time)
- House of Glory
  - HOG Tag Team Championship (2 times, current)
- International Wrestling Cartel
  - IWC Tag Team Championship (1 time)
- MCW Pro Wrestling
  - MCW Tag Team Championship (1 time)
- New Dimension Wrestling
  - NDW Tag Team Championship (1 time)
- Northeast Wrestling
  - NEW Tag Team Championship (1 time, current)
- NWA 2000
  - NWA 2000 Tag Team Championship (1 time)
- Organization of Modern Extreme Grappling Arts
  - OMEGA Tag Team Championship (2 times)
- Pro Wrestling Illustrated
  - Match of the Year (2000) vs. The Dudley Boyz and Edge and Christian in a triangle ladder match at WrestleMania 2000
  - Match of the Year (2001) vs. The Dudley Boyz and Edge and Christian in a Tables, Ladders and Chairs match at WrestleMania X-Seven
  - Tag Team of the Year (2000, 2025)
  - Comeback of the Year (2017)
- Ring of Honor
  - ROH World Tag Team Championship (1 time)
  - Holy S*** Moment of the Decade (2010s) – Hardys Show Up, Win ROH World Tag Team Gold
- Total Nonstop Action Wrestling
  - TNA World Tag Team Championship (5 times)
  - TNA World Tag Team Championship #1 Contender Tournament (2014)
  - TNA World Tag Team Championship Tournament (2015)
  - Race for the Case (2017 – Green Case) – Jeff
  - TNA Year End Awards (1 time)
    - Tag Team of the Year (2025)
- World Wrestling Federation/World Wrestling Entertainment/WWE
  - WWE Championship (1 time) – Jeff
  - World Heavyweight Championship (2 times) – Jeff
  - ECW Championship (1 time) – Matt
  - WWF/E Intercontinental Championship (2 times) – Jeff
  - WWE United States Championship (2 times) – Jeff (1) & Matt (1)
  - WWF/E European Championship (2 times) – Jeff (1) and Matt (1)
  - WWF/E Hardcore Championship (4 times) – Jeff (3) and Matt (1)
  - WWF Light Heavyweight Championship (1 time) – Jeff
  - WWE Raw Tag Team Championship (1 time)
  - WWE SmackDown Tag Team Championship (1 time)
  - WWF/E World Tag Team Championship (6 times)
  - NXT Tag Team Championship (1 time)
  - WCW Tag Team Championship (1 time)
  - 18th Triple Crown Champion – Jeff
  - Ninth Grand Slam Champion (under original format; Ninth overall) – Jeff
  - Fourth WWE Tag Team Triple Crown Champions
  - Terri Invitational Tournament (1999)
- Wrestling Superstar
  - Wrestling Superstar Tag Team Championship (1 time)
