= No Surrender (2014) =

Professional wrestling event

- Promotion: Total Nonstop Action Wrestling
- Date: August 7, 2014 (aired September 17, 2014)
- City: New York City, New York
- Venue: Manhattan Center Grand Ballroom
- Attendance: 1,100
- Tagline: Free on Spike TV

No Surrender chronology
← Previous; 2013	Next → 2015

Impact Wrestling special episodes chronology
← Previous; Hardcore Justice	Next → Lockdown

The 2014 No Surrender (also known as Impact Wrestling: No Surrender) was a professional wrestling television special produced by Total Nonstop Action Wrestling (TNA). It took place on August 7, 2014 at the Manhattan Center Grand Ballroom in Midtown Manhattan, New York City, New York. It was the tenth event under the No Surrender chronology. It aired as a special edition of TNA's weekly broadcast of Impact Wrestling on September 17, 2014.

Six professional wrestling matches were contested at the event. In the main event, Lashley successfully defended the TNA World Heavyweight Championship against Bobby Roode. In prominent matches on the undercard, The Wolves (Davey Richards and Eddie Edwards) defended the World Tag Team Championship against The Hardys (Jeff Hardy and Matt Hardy) and Team 3D (Bully Ray and Devon) in a ladder match and Samoa Joe defended the X Division Championship against Homicide.

== Storylines ==
No Surrender featured professional wrestling matches that involved different wrestlers from pre-existing scripted feuds and storylines. Wrestlers portray villains, heroes, or less distinguishable characters in the scripted events that build tension and culminate in a wrestling match or series of matches.

At Hardcore Justice, Bobby Roode and Eric Young simultaneously won a Six Sides of Steel match to determine the #1 contender for the TNA World Heavyweight Championship. On the August 27 episode of Impact Wrestling, the Director of Wrestling Operations Kurt Angle announced that Young and Roode would compete in a match on the September 3 episode of Impact Wrestling and the winner of that match would become the #1 contender for the title. Roode won the match, thus earning the title shot against Lashley at No Surrender.

At Hardcore Justice, Kurt Angle announced that the World Tag Team Champions The Wolves (Davey Richards and Eddie Edwards), The Hardys (Jeff Hardy and Matt Hardy) and Team 3D (Bully Ray and Devon) would compete in a three match series and the team to score two wins would win the series and the winner of the first match would be able to pick the stipulation for the next match. The first three-way match took place on the August 27 episode of Impact Wrestling, which Team 3D won. Team 3D chose a tables match, which took place on the September 10 episode of Impact Wrestling, which Hardys won. Hardys were then allowed to choose the next stipulation which was a ladder match and it was announced that it would take place at No Surrender and Wolves' World Tag Team Championship would be on the line in the match.

It was announced that Samoa Joe would defend the X Division Championship against Homicide at No Surrender.

A Knockouts battle royal was announced for No Surrender to determine the #1 contender to Gail Kim's Knockouts Championship and would also feature the newcomer Jessicka Havok as one of the participants, thus marking her first match in TNA.

On the September 3 episode of Impact Wrestling, Bram and Magnus defeated Gunner and Samuel Shaw in a tag team match, leading to a match between Gunner and Bram at No Surrender.

On the September 10 episode of Impact Wrestling, Team 3D's new trainee and United States Army veteran Chris Melendez made his TNA debut by defeating DJ Z. It was announced that Melendez would compete in his next match against Kenny King at No Surrender.

== Event ==
=== Preliminary matches ===
The event kicked off with a Knockouts battle royal to determine the #1 contender for the TNA Knockouts Championship. Havok dominated the match earlier on. Madison Rayne was the first to get eliminated as she tried to kick Havok but Havok caught her foot and tossed her over the top rope. Taryn Terrell jumped on Havok's back but Havok tossed her over the top rope but Terrell jumped on the apron and Havok punched her to eliminate her. Havok then eliminated Brittany by hitting her a forearm smash on the apron. Rebel would then eliminate Angelina Love as Love charged at her but Rebel pulled the rope down, causing Love's elimination. Havok next eliminated Rebel by catching her foot and tossing her over the top rope. Havok and Velvet Sky were the last two remaining participants. Sky hit a diving crossbody on Havok but Havok caught her and tossed her over the top rope to eliminate her for the win.

Next, Chris Melendez took on Kenny King. MVP distracted Melendez, allowing King to attack him from behind. King attempted to nail a Royal Flush but Melendez countered with a roll-up and pinned King for the win. King attacked Melendez after the match and delivered a Royal Flush to him and then Mr. Anderson made the save forcing King to retreat.

Next, Samoa Joe defended the X Division Championship against Homicide. Joe countered a Gringo Cutter by Homicide into a Coquina Clutch to make Homicide submit and retain the title. James Storm and The Great Sanada attacked Joe and Homicide after the match and then Manik delivered a frog splash to Homicide.

Later, The Wolves (Davey Richards and Eddie Edwards) defended the World Tag Team Championship against The Hardys (Jeff Hardy and Matt Hardy) and Team 3D (Bully Ray and Devon) in a ladder match, the third match of the three-match series between the three teams. Richards pulled a ladder from underneath Jeff, causing Jeff to crash down and allowed Edwards to climb the ladder and retrieve the title belts to retain the titles.

It was followed by the penultimate match of the event pitting Gunner against Bram. Gunner's knee gave up as he tried to nail a powerbomb to Bram. Samuel Shaw then charged at Bram but Bram sidestepped and Shaw accidentally hit Gunner and Bram pinned him for the win.

=== Main event match ===
In the main event, Lashley defended the World Heavyweight Championship against Bobby Roode. MVP was ejected from the ringside by the referee during the match while interfering by grabbing Roode's leg as Roode had climbed the top rope. Kenny King then tried to interfere when Roode countered a spear by Lashley into a crossface as King brought Roode closer to the ropes. Eric Young then showed up at ringside to attack King. Roode injured his knee while sidestepping a spear by Lashley. He then tried to nail a Roode Bomb to Lashley but his knee gave up and Lashley nailed a spear to Roode to retain the title.

== Aftermath ==
Havok received her Knockouts Championship title shot against Gail Kim on the October 1 episode of Impact Wrestling. Havok won the title.

Mr. Anderson and Chris Melendez began feuding with MVP and Kenny King after No Surrender. On the October 1 episode of Impact Wrestling, MVP defeated Anderson. On the October 22 episode of Impact Wrestling, Anderson and Melendez entered the tag team tournament to determine the #1 contenders for the World Tag Team Championship, in which they lost to MVP and King in the opening round. Melendez defeated King via disqualification on the November 19 episode of Impact Wrestling to end the feud.

Due to winning the ladder match at No Surrender, The Wolves named the final match of the series with Team 3D and The Hardys, a Full Metal Mayhem match on the October 8 episode of Impact Wrestling, which Wolves won to win the series and retain the World Tag Team Championship.

On the October 15 episode of Impact Wrestling, Bobby Roode defeated Austin Aries, Eric Young and Jeff Hardy in a four-way elimination match to become the #1 contender for the World Heavyweight Championship, thus earning another title shot. Roode defeated Lashley to win the title in a No Surrender rematch on the October 29 episode of Impact Wrestling. Lashley regained the title from Roode on the January 7, 2015 episode of Impact Wrestling.

== Results ==
No.	Results	Stipulations	Times
1	Havok won by last eliminating Velvet Sky (Note: Order of elimination: Madison Rayne, Taryn Terrell, Brittany, Angelina Love, Rebel and Velvet Sky.)	Knockouts battle royal to determine the #1 contender for the TNA Knockouts Championship	06:00
2	Chris Melendez defeated Kenny King (with MVP)	Singles match	07:57
3	Samoa Joe (c) defeated Homicide via submission	Singles match for the TNA X Division Championship	05:43
4	The Wolves (Davey Richards and Eddie Edwards) (c) defeated The Hardys (Jeff Hardy and Matt Hardy) and Team 3D (Bully Ray and Devon)	Three-way tag team ladder match for the TNA World Tag Team Championship	18:18
5	Bram defeated Gunner (with Samuel Shaw)	Singles match	04:04
6	Lashley (c) defeated Bobby Roode	Singles match for the TNA World Heavyweight Championship	17:06
(c) / – the champion(s) heading into the match
