= TNA Impact! premiere on Spike TV =

Professional wrestling television special

- Promotion: Total Nonstop Action Wrestling
- Brand: TNA Impact!
- Date: September 27, 2005 (aired October 1, 2005)
- City: Orlando, Florida
- Venue: TNA Impact Zone

Impact special episodes chronology
← Previous; TNA Impact! debut episode	Next → Impact! Primetime Special

The TNA Impact! premiere on Spike TV was a professional wrestling television special produced by the professional wrestling promotion Total Nonstop Action Wrestling (TNA). It marked the debut of TNA's flagship weekly program, Impact! on Spike TV. The show took place on September 27, 2005 at Soundstage 21 (known as the Impact Zone) at Universal Studios Florida in Orlando, Florida, and was aired on tape delay on October 1, 2005.

== Storylines ==
The event included matches that resulted from scripted storylines, where wrestlers portrayed heroes, villains, or less distinguishable characters in scripted events that built tension and culminated in a wrestling match or series of matches. Results were predetermined by TNA's writers.

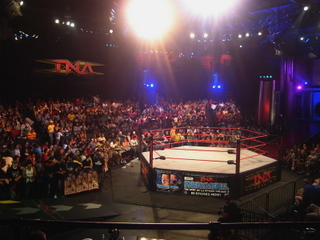
The Impact Zone

== Event ==
Don West and Mike Tenay introduced the debut of episode as part of the commentary team. Jeremy Borash was also a member of the production team.

== Results ==
No.	Results	Stipulations	Times
1	AJ Styles defeated Roderick Strong	Singles match	4:01
2	Monty Brown defeated Lex Lovett	Singles match	1:01
3	Chris Sabin defeated Alex Shelley and Petey Williams	Three way match	10:30
4	Jeff Hardy vs. Rhino ended in a no contest	Singles match	4:18
