= No Surrender (2015) =

- Promotion: Total Nonstop Action Wrestling
- Date: June 27, 2015 (aired August 5, 2015)
- City: Orlando, Florida
- Venue: Impact Wrestling Zone
- Attendance: 1,100
- Tagline: Free on Destination America

No Surrender chronology
← Previous; 2014	Next → 2019

Impact Wrestling special episodes chronology
← Previous; Hardcore Justice	Next → Turning Point

No Surrender (2015) (also known as Impact Wrestling: No Surrender) was a professional wrestling event produced by Total Nonstop Action Wrestling (TNA). It took place at the Impact Wrestling Zone in Orlando, Florida on June 27, 2015. It was the eleventh event under the No Surrender chronology and aired as a special edition of TNA's weekly broadcast of Impact Wrestling on Destination America on August 5, 2015.

Six professional wrestling matches were contested at the event. The main event was a Full Metal Mayhem match for the TNA World Heavyweight Championship, in which Ethan Carter III successfully defended the title against Matt Hardy. The undercard notably featured Austin Aries' last match in TNA against Rockstar Spud, which stipulated that if Aries won then he would take Spud's "Rockstar" nickname and if Spud won then Aries would have to leave TNA, which Aries lost.

== Storylines ==
No Surrender featured professional wrestling matches that involved different wrestlers from pre-existing scripted feuds and storylines. Wrestlers portrayed villains, heroes, or less distinguishable characters in the scripted events that built tension and culminated in a wrestling match or series of matches.

== Event ==
=== Preliminary matches ===
The event kicked off with a match between Mr. Anderson and Bram. Bram tried to hit Anderson with a microphone but Anderson countered with a small package and pinned Bram for the win. Bram hit Anderson with the microphone after the match.

After the match, James Storm cut a promo insulting his Revolution teammate Khoya and Khoya retaliated by hitting a Sky High to Storm and proclaimed that his name was Mahabali Shera.

Next, Gail Kim took on The Dollhouse (Taryn Terrell, Jade and Marti Bell) in a 3-on-1 Handicap match. Dollhouse triple teamed Kim throughout the match until Kim gained momentum which led to Terrell retreating from the ring and she escaped through the crowd. Kim then countered a double suplex by Jade and Bell and dropkicked both of them and nailed an Eat Defeat to Bell for the win.

Next, Eli Drake took on Drew Galloway. Drake poked Galloway in the eye and rolled him up and grabbed the ropes for leverage to pin him for the win.

Later, Austin Aries took on Rockstar Spud in a match which stipulated that if Aries won then he would get Spud's "Rockstar" nickname and if Spud won then Aries would be forced to leave TNA. Spud countered a back superplex by Aries into an Underdog for the win, thus forcing Aries to leave TNA.

This was followed by the penultimate match of the event between Mahabali Shera and James Storm. Storm hit Shera with a cowbell, thus getting disqualified.

=== Main event match ===
The main event was a Full Metal Mayhem match, in which Ethan Carter III defended the World Heavyweight Championship against Matt Hardy. After knocking off EC3 through a table with a diving leg drop from a ladder, Hardy climbed the ladder to retrieve the title belt. EC3 then hit a chair to Hardy's knee and then kicked his knee out to send Hardy to the mat and then climbed the ladder and retrieved the title belt to retain the title.

== Results ==
No.	Results	Stipulations	Times
1	Mr. Anderson defeated Bram	Singles match	09:32
2	Gail Kim defeated The Dollhouse (Taryn Terrell, Jade and Marti Bell)	3-on-1 Handicap match	05:09
3	Eli Drake defeated Drew Galloway	Singles match	03:48
4	Rockstar Spud defeated Austin Aries	Singles match; Since Spud won, Aries had to leave TNA. Had Aries won, he would have taken "Rockstar" from Spud's name.	11:19
5	Mahabali Shera defeated James Storm by disqualification	Singles match	01:41
6	Ethan Carter III (c) defeated Matt Hardy	Full Metal Mayhem match for the TNA World Heavyweight Championship	20:06
(c) / – the champion(s) heading into the match
