= No Surrender (2021) =

2021 Impact Wrestling event

- Promotional poster featuring The Good Brothers (Doc Gallows and Karl Anderson) and Private Party (Isiah Kassidy and Marq Quen) (with Matt Hardy)
- Promotion: Impact Wrestling
- Date: February 13, 2021
- City: Nashville, Tennessee
- Venue: Skyway Studios
- Attendance: 0 (behind closed doors) (Note: The event was held without a paying audience due to the COVID-19 pandemic in the United States.)

Impact Plus Monthly Specials chronology
← Previous; Genesis	Next → Sacrifice

No Surrender chronology
← Previous; 2019	Next → 2022

The 2021 No Surrender was a professional wrestling event produced by Impact Wrestling. It took place on February 13, 2021, at the Skyway Studios in Nashville, Tennessee. It was the 13th event under the No Surrender chronology and aired exclusively on Impact Plus. The event featured wrestlers from partner promotion All Elite Wrestling (AEW).

Nine matches were contested at the event. In the main event, Rich Swann defeated Tommy Dreamer to retain the Impact World Championship. In other prominent matches, The Good Brothers (Doc Gallows and Karl Anderson) defeated Chris Sabin and James Storm, and Private Party (Isiah Kassidy and Marq Quen) in a three-way tag team match to retain the Impact World Tag Team Championship, and Josh Alexander won a X Division Triple Threat Revolver to become the number one contender to the Impact X Division Championship.

== Production ==
=== Background ===
No Surrender is an annual professional wrestling event produced by Impact Wrestling. It was originally produced by Impact Wrestling (then known as Total Nonstop Action Wrestling), as a pay-per-view (PPV) event. The first one was held in July 2005, but when the PPV names were shuffled for 2006, it was moved to September. In December 2012, TNA announced that the event was canceled. The last event took place in the TNA Impact! Zone in September 2012. It was resumed as a special episode of Impact Wrestling between 2013 and 2015 and was then revived as an Impact Plus event in 2019.

=== Storylines ===
The event featured professional wrestling matches that involve different wrestlers from pre-existing scripted feuds and storylines. Wrestlers portrayed villains, heroes, or less distinguishable characters in scripted events that build tension and culminate in a wrestling match or series of matches.

At Hard To Kill, AEW World Champion Kenny Omega and the Impact World Tag Team Champions The Good Brothers (Doc Gallows and Karl Anderson) defeated Impact World Champion Rich Swann, Chris Sabin, and Moose in a six-man tag team match. On the January 19 episode of Impact!, The Good Brothers celebrated their victory and said that they would remain Tag Team Champions for a while. They were then interrupted by Sabin, who claimed that he and Alex Shelley, who is Sabin's tag team partner as part of The Motor City Machine Guns, never lost the titles in the four-way tag team match at Bound for Glory, as they were never pinned. Gallows said he would offer them a rematch but did not, as Shelley was out due to "unfortunate circumstances", which led to James Storm, who teamed up with Sabin before, coming to the ring. As Storm was talking, they were interrupted by AEW wrestlers Matt Hardy and Private Party (Isiah Kassidy and Marq Quen), who challenged The Good Brothers to a title match. They replied by challenging them to face Sabin and Storm to determine the number one contender for the titles, which Hardy accepted. Later on the same episode, Private Party defeated Sabin and Storm to become the number one contenders for the titles. Impact later confirmed that The Good Brothers would defend the titles against Private Party at No Surrender. However, Impact later announced that Sabin and Storm would challenge The Good Brothers for the titles on the February 9 episode of Impact!, which could mean that Private Party would challenge Sabin and Storm for the titles instead if they win. On that Impact! episode, Sabin and Storm defeated The Good Brothers via disqualification due to interference from Private Party. Scott D'Amore later announced that Sabin and Storm was added to the title match, making it a three-way tag team match.

On the January 26 episode of Impact!, Impact World Champion Rich Swann offered Tommy Dreamer a title match at No Surrender in recognition of all the help Dreamer gave him in his career, and the fact that the event falls on Dreamer's 50th birthday. Dreamer would accept, and the match was made.

At Hard To Kill, X Division Champion TJP under his Manik persona, defeated Chris Bey and Rohit Raju to retain his title. On the January 19 episode of Impact!, Raju confronted Impact Executive Vice President Scott D'Amore about wanting a match with TJP that he got, but left before D'Amore told TJP that it was going to be non-title. On the February 2 episode of Impact!, Raju defeated TJP in that non-title match, with help from returning Desi Hit Squad ally Mahabali Shera. It was later announced that TJP will defend his title against Raju at No Surrender.

On February 4, it was announced that a new match format - the Triple Threat Revolver - will take place at No Surrender, with the winner receiving an X-Division Championship match. Ace Austin, Blake Christian, Chris Bey, Daivari, Josh Alexander, Suicide, Trey Miguel, and Willie Mack have been named as the participants.

The rules of the match are as follows:

- Three men will start the match.
- The match proceeds under standard Triple Threat rules
- Once a participant has been pinned or submitted, they are eliminated and a new participant enters based on the number that he drew (4–8).
- The process is repeated until all competitors have entered the match, with the last fall determining the winner.

== Results ==
No.	Results	Stipulations	Times
1	Decay (Black Taurus, Crazzy Steve, and Rosemary) defeated XXXL (Acey Romero and Larry D) and Tenille Dashwood (with Kaleb with a K) by pinfall	Six-person tag team match	7:57
2	Brian Myers and Hernandez defeated Eddie Edwards and Matt Cardona by pinfall	Tag team match	9:55
3	Jake Something defeated Deaner (with Eric Young and Joe Doering) by pinfall	Singles match	10:23
4	Josh Alexander defeated Ace Austin (with Madman Fulton), Blake Christian, Chris Bey, Daivari, Suicide, Trey Miguel, and Willie Mack by pinfall	X Division Triple Threat Revolver to determine the number one contender for the Impact X Division Championship	22:14
5	Fire 'N Flava (Kiera Hogan and Tasha Steelz) (c) defeated Havok and Nevaeh by pinfall	Texas Tornado No Disqualification match for the Impact Knockouts Tag Team Championship	9:17
6	TJP (c) defeated Rohit Raju (with Mahabali Shera) by pinfall	Singles match for the Impact X Division Championship	10:27
7	Jordynne Grace, Jazz, and ODB defeated Deonna Purrazzo, Kimber Lee, and Susan by submission	Six-Knockout tag team match	8:47
8	The Good Brothers (Doc Gallows and Karl Anderson) (c) defeated Chris Sabin and James Storm and Private Party (Isiah Kassidy and Marq Quen) (with Matt Hardy) by pinfall	Three-Way tag team match for the Impact World Tag Team Championship	13:52
9	Rich Swann (c) defeated Tommy Dreamer by pinfall	Singles match for the Impact World Championship	15:21
(c) / – the champion(s) heading into the match
