= TNA Impact! Primetime Special =

Professional wrestling television special

- Promotion: Total Nonstop Action Wrestling
- Brand: TNA Impact!
- Date: October 25, 2005 (aired November 3, 2005)
- City: Orlando, Florida
- Venue: TNA Impact Zone

Impact special episodes chronology
| ← Previous; TNA iMPACT! Spike TV debut | Next → TNA New Year's Eve |

The TNA Impact! Primetime Special was a special 2-hour episode for the American television program TNA Impact!, produced by the professional wrestling promotion of Total Nonstop Action Wrestling. The show took place on October 25, 2005 at Soundstage 21 (known as the Impact Zone) in Universal Studios Florida in Orlando, Florida, and was aired on tape delay on November 3, 2005 on Spike TV.

== Storylines ==
The event included matches that resulted from scripted storylines, where wrestlers portrayed heroes, villains, or less distinguishable characters in scripted events that built tension and culminated in a wrestling match or series of matches. Results were predetermined by TNA's writers.

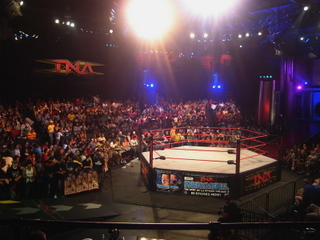
The Impact Zone

== Event ==
Don West and Mike Tenay introduced the debut of episode as part of the commentary team. Jeremy Borash was also a member of the production team.

== Results ==
| No. | Results | Stipulations | Times |
|---|---|---|---|
| 1 | Jeff Hardy, Lance Hoyt and Sabu defeated The Diamonds in the Rough (David Young, Elix Skipper and Simon Diamond) | Six Man Tag Team match | 3:02 |
| 2 | Monty Brown defeated Brian Gamble | Singles match | 2:14 |
| 3 | AJ Styles, Austin Aries and Sonjay Dutt defeated Alex Shelley, Christopher Daniels and Samoa Joe | Six Man Tag Team match | 9:53 |
| 4 | Team 3D (Brother Ray and Brother Devon) defeated Team Canada (Bobby Roode and Eric Young | Tag Team match | 14:35 |
| 5 | Petey Williams (w/ Scott D'Amore defeated Chris Sabin, Matt Bentley (w/ Tracy Brookshaw | Ultimate X match | 15:13 |
| 6 | Jeff Jarrett defeated Rhino (c) for the NWA World's Heavyweight Championship | Singles match | 12:57 |
(c) / – the champion(s) heading into the match
