= Hardcore Justice (2014) =

2014 Total Nonstop Action Wrestling pay-per-view event

- Promotion: Total Nonstop Action Wrestling
- Date: August 5, 2014 (aired August 20, 2014)
- City: Midtown Manhattan, New York City
- Venue: Grand Ballroom
- Attendance: 700
- Tagline: "It's not always about winning - it's about surviving"

Hardcore Justice chronology
← Previous; 2013	Next → 2015

Impact Wrestling special episodes chronology
← Previous; Destination X	Next → No Surrender

The 2014 Hardcore Justice (also known as Impact Wrestling: Hardcore Justice) was a professional wrestling event produced by Total Nonstop Action Wrestling (TNA). It took place on August 5, 2014, at the Grand Ballroom in Midtown Manhattan, New York City. It was the tenth event under the Hardcore Justice chronology and aired as a special edition of TNA's weekly broadcast of Impact Wrestling on August 20, 2014.

Five professional wrestling matches were contested at the event. The main event was a Six Sides of Steel match to determine the #1 contender for the TNA World Heavyweight Championship contested between Bobby Roode, Eric Young, Gunner, Austin Aries, Magnus and James Storm. Roode and Young simultaneously won the match to earn the title shot. On the undercard, Gail Kim successfully defended the Knockouts Championship against Angelina Love in a Last Knockout Standing match, Mr. Anderson defeated Samuel Shaw in an "I Quit" match, Samoa Joe successfully defended the X Division Championship against Low Ki and Bram defeated Abyss in a Stairway to Janice match.

== Storylines ==
Mr. Anderson had been feuding with Samuel Shaw earlier in the year as the two traded wins in a steel cage match at Lockdown, a Straitjacket match on the April 3 episode of Impact Wrestling and a Committed match at Sacrifice. Shaw would then be sent into a psychiatric facility for intervention and was released from the facility on the June 26 episode of Impact Wrestling under the supervision of Gunner, who helped Shaw throughout the duration. The following week, on Impact Wrestling, Shaw apologized to Anderson and Christy Hemme for his recent behavior. On the August 7 episode of Impact Wrestling, Gunner, Shaw and Anderson competed in a six-man tag team match against The BroMans (Robbie E, Jessie Godderz and DJ Z), which the former trio lost and Anderson blamed Shaw for the loss. On the August 14 episode of Impact Wrestling, Shaw attacked Anderson during Anderson's match with Gunner, which led to an "I Quit" match between Anderson and Shaw at Hardcore Justice.

Magnus defeated Willow in a match at Slammiversary XII. On the June 19 episode of Impact Wrestling, Willow and Abyss attacked Bram and Magnus backstage after Bram and Magnus lost their World Tag Team Championship match against The Wolves. The following week, on Impact Wrestling, Bram and Magnus defeated Abyss and Willow in a Monster's Ball match. Abyss then disappeared from TNA for over a month until he returned to TNA on the July 24 episode of Impact Wrestling by attacking Bram and Magnus after Bram and Magnus attacked Mr. Anderson and Gunner. On the August 7 episode of Impact Wrestling, Bram defeated Abyss in a Monster's Ball match by using Janice (A Nail Board that was commonly used by Abyss). On the August 14 episode of Impact Wrestling, Abyss demanded that Bram return Janice to him and then Abyss challenged Bram to a Stairway to Janice match at Hardcore Justice, which was later made official.

At Slammiversary XII, Angelina Love defeated Gail Kim to retain the Knockouts Championship. On the July 3 episode of Impact Wrestling, Kim defeated Love in a rematch to win the title. Kim successfully defended the title against Love, Madison Rayne and Brittany in a four-way match on the following week's episode of Impact Wrestling. On the July 24 episode of Impact Wrestling, Love attacked Kim and Taryn Terrell during Kim's Knockouts Championship title defense against Terrell. On the August 14 episode of Impact Wrestling, Kim successfully defended the title against Terrell, Love and Sky in a four-way match. It was later announced that Kim would defend the title against Love in a Last Knockout Standing match at Hardcore Justice.

At Destination X, Lashley successfully defended the World Heavyweight Championship against Austin Aries. On the August 7 episode of Impact Wrestling, Lashley, MVP and Kenny King cut a promo about Lashley being the dominant champion who had beaten everyone until Bobby Roode challenged him to a match to put the title on the line claiming that Lashley had never beaten Roode. Lashley, MVP and King attacked Roode until Aries and Eric Young made the save. On the August 14 episode of Impact Wrestling, Lashley, MVP and King defeated Roode, Young and Aries in a six-man tag team match. It was later announced that Young, Roode, Aries, Magnus, Gunner and James Storm would compete in a Six Sides of Steel match at Hardcore Justice to determine the #1 contender for the TNA World Heavyweight Championship.

At Destination X, Low Ki, Samoa Joe and Sanada won their respective three-way matches to qualify for a three-way match for the vacant X Division Championship on the August 7 episode of Impact Wrestling, which Joe won. On the August 14 episode of Impact Wrestling, Ki defeated Crazzy Steve, Tigre Uno, Manik, Homicide and DJZ in a six-way elimination match to become the #1 contender for the X Division Championship at Hardcore Justice.

== Event ==
=== Preliminary matches ===
The event kicked off with a Stairway to Janice match between Abyss and Bram. Bram initially retrieved Janice by climbing the ladder but Abyss delivered a Black Hole Slam to Bram onto the thumbtacks. Abyss got Janice but then Bram hit a low blow to Abyss and hit him with Janice for the win.

Ethan Carter III, Rhino and Rockstar Spud cut a promo where EC3 addressed his aunt Dixie Carter being put through a table by Bully Ray a few weeks ago and held Rhino responsible for that which led to a confrontation between the two and then EC3 turned on Rhino by attacking him.

Next, Samoa Joe defended the X Division Championship against Low Ki. Joe tried to hit a muscle buster on Ki twice but Ki countered but then Joe managed to nail a muscle buster to Ki on his third attempt to retain the title.

Later, Mr. Anderson took on Samuel Shaw in an "I Quit" match. They began brawling backstage while Anderson was being interviewed by Jeremy Borash regarding his match against Shaw. After a back and forth match throughout the ringside area, Anderson forced Shaw to quit by crashing Shaw shoulder first into a ring post and applying an armbar on Shaw. Anderson refused to release the hold until Gunner forced Anderson to break the hold.

The penultimate match of the event was a Last Knockout Standing match, in which Gail Kim defended the Knockouts Championship against Angelina Love. Sky interfered in the match on Love's behalf throughout the match until Kim grabbed Sky and tossed her into Love and then Kim knocked out Love by hitting a Samoan drop from the top rope and Love was unable to get up before the referee's ten count, resulting in Kim retaining the Knockouts Championship.

=== Main event match ===
The main event match was a Six Sides of Steel match between Bobby Roode, Eric Young, Gunner, Austin Aries, Magnus and James Storm to determine the #1 contender for the TNA World Heavyweight Championship. Roode and Young simultaneously escaped the cage and were declared the winners of the match.

== Reception ==
This edition of Hardcore Justice marked the first episode of Impact Wrestling to air on Wednesday night. Due to moving from Thursday to Wednesday on one week notice, many fans were unaware of the change, the episode scored a 0.65 rating and was viewed by 852,000 viewers, making it the lowest rated and viewed Impact Wrestling episode since April 2010.

== Aftermath ==
The controversial win of Bobby Roode and Eric Young led to the Director of Wrestling Operations Kurt Angle making a match between Roode and Young to determine the #1 contender for the TNA World Heavyweight Championship on the September 3 episode of Impact Wrestling, which Roode won, thus setting up a title match between Roode and Lashley at No Surrender.

On the August 27 episode of Impact Wrestling, Rhino competed against Ethan Carter III in a match, which EC3 lost via disqualification after Rockstar Spud attacked EC3. On the September 10 episode of Impact Wrestling, EC3 defeated Rhino in a New York City Street Fight to end the feud.

== Results ==
No.	Results	Stipulations	Times
1	Bram defeated Abyss	Stairway to Janice match	08:30
2	Samoa Joe (c) defeated Low Ki	Singles match for the TNA X Division Championship	08:10
3	Mr. Anderson defeated Samuel Shaw	"I Quit" match	05:50
4	Gail Kim (c) defeated Angelina Love (with Velvet Sky)	Last Knockout Standing match for the TNA Knockouts Championship	08:20
5	Bobby Roode and Eric Young defeated Gunner, Austin Aries, Magnus and James Storm	Six Sides of Steel match to determine the #1 contender for the TNA World Heavyweight Championship	12:00
(c) / – the champion(s) heading into the match
