= TNA No Surrender =

Total Nonstop Action Wrestling pay-per-view event series

No Surrender
- TNA No Surrender logo (since 2024)
- Promotions: Total Nonstop Action Wrestling
- First event: No Surrender (2005)

No Surrender is an annual professional wrestling event produced by Total Nonstop Action Wrestling. It was originally produced by TNA Wrestling, as a pay-per-view (PPV) event. The first one was held in July 2005, but when the PPV names were shuffled for 2006, it was moved to September. In December 2012, TNA announced that the event was canceled. The last event took place in the TNA Impact! Zone in September 2012. It was resumed as a special episode of Impact Wrestling between 2013 and 2015 and was then revived as an Impact Plus event in 2019.

== Events ==
One Night Only branded event	TNA+ exclusive event

#	Event	Date	City	Venue	Main event	Ref.
1	No Surrender (2005)	July 17, 2005	Orlando, Florida	TNA Impact! Zone at Universal Studios Florida	Raven (c) vs. Abyss in a No Surrender Dog Collar match for the NWA World Heavyweight Championship	
2	No Surrender (2006)	September 24, 2006	Orlando, Florida	TNA Impact! Zone at Universal Studios Florida	Jeff Jarrett vs. Samoa Joe in a Fan's Revenge Lumberjack match	
3	No Surrender (2007)	September 9, 2007	Orlando, Florida	TNA Impact! Zone at Universal Studios Florida	Kurt Angle (c) vs. Abyss for the TNA World Heavyweight Championship	
4	No Surrender (2008)	September 14, 2008	Oshawa, Ontario, Canada	General Motors Centre	Samoa Joe (c) vs. Christian Cage vs. Kurt Angle in a Three Ways to Glory match for the TNA World Heavyweight Championship	
5	No Surrender (2009)	September 20, 2009	Orlando, Florida	TNA Impact! Zone at Universal Studios Florida	Kurt Angle (c) vs. A.J. Styles vs. Hernandez vs. Matt Morgan vs. Sting in a five-way match for the TNA World Heavyweight Championship	
6	No Surrender (2010)	September 5, 2010	Orlando, Florida	TNA Impact! Zone at Universal Studios Florida	Mr. Anderson vs. D'Angelo Dinero in the second semifinal match of the TNA World Heavyweight Championship Tournament	
7	No Surrender (2011)	September 11, 2011	Orlando, Florida	Impact Zone at Universal Studios Florida	Kurt Angle (c) vs. Mr. Anderson vs. Sting in a three-way match for the TNA World Heavyweight Championship	
8	No Surrender (2012)	September 9, 2012	Orlando, Florida	Impact Zone at Universal Studios Florida	Bully Ray vs. Jeff Hardy in the 2012 Bound for Glory Series final match	
9	No Surrender (2013)	September 12, 2013	St. Louis, Missouri	Chaifetz Arena	A.J. Styles vs. Magnus in the 2013 Bound for Glory Series final match	
10	No Surrender (2014)	September 17, 2014 (Note: The event was taped on August 7, 2014.)	New York City, New York	Manhattan Center Grand Ballroom	Lashley (c) vs. Bobby Roode for the TNA World Heavyweight Championship	
11	No Surrender (2015)	August 5, 2015 (Note: The event was taped on June 27, 2015.)	Orlando, Florida	Impact Zone at Universal Studios Florida	Ethan Carter III (c) vs. Matt Hardy in a Full Metal Mayhem match for the TNA World Heavyweight Championship	
12	One Night Only: No Surrender 2017	June 16, 2017 (Note: The event was taped on April 23, 2017.)	Orlando, Florida	Impact Zone at Universal Studios Florida	Lashley (c) vs. Eddie Edwards for the Impact Wrestling World Heavyweight Championship	
13	No Surrender (2019)	December 7, 2019	Dayton, Ohio	The Brightside Music & Event Venue	Sami Callihan (c) vs. Rich Swann for the Impact World Championship	
14	No Surrender (2021)	February 13, 2021	Nashville, Tennessee	Skyway Studios	Rich Swann (c) vs. Tommy Dreamer for the Impact World Championship	
15	No Surrender (2022)	February 19, 2022	Westwego, Louisiana	Alario Center	Team Impact (Chris Sabin, Rhino, Rich Swann, Steve Maclin, and Willie Mack) vs. Honor No More (Matt Taven, Mike Bennett, PCO, Vincent and Kenny King) (with Maria Kanellis-Bennett) in a 10-man tag team match	
16	No Surrender (2023)	February 24, 2023	Sunrise Manor, Nevada	Sam's Town Live	Josh Alexander (c) vs. Rich Swann for the Impact World Championship	
17	No Surrender (2024)	February 23, 2024	Westwego, Louisiana	Alario Center	Moose (c) vs. Alex Shelley in a No Surrender match for the TNA World Championship	
18	No Surrender (2026)	February 13, 2026	Nashville, Tennessee	The Pinnacle	Mike Santana and Leon Slater vs. Nic Nemeth and Eddie Edwards	
(c) – refers to the champion(s) heading into the match
