= MegaCorp Pavilion =

Concert venue located in Newport, Kentucky

- Interactive map of MegaCorp Pavilion
- Former names: PromoWest Pavilion at Ovation
- Address: 101 West 4th Street
- Location: Newport, Kentucky
- Coordinates: 39.0917°N 84.4986°W
- Owner: PromoWest Productions
- Capacity: 2,700 (Indoor Music Hall); 5,500 (Outdoor Amphitheater)

Construction
- Opened: 2021

Website
- promowestlive.com/our-venues/megacorp-pavilion

The MegaCorp Pavilion is a multi-purpose music venue located in Newport, Kentucky. Opening in late 2021, the venues operate year-round with indoor and outdoor facilities: the Indoor Music Hall and Outdoor Amphitheater.

== History ==
On November 20, 2018, Corporex revealed their plans to construct a mixed-use complex on a vacant plot of riverfront property near the Ohio River which would include hotel space, residential units, restaurants, parks, trails, and public plazas. On May 9, 2019, Corporex announced an agreement with AEG Presents, the parent company of PromoWest, to construct a music venue in Newport, Kentucky which was billed as phase 1 of the Ovation project with construction beginning later that month. The venue opened on August 29, 2021, with Ke$ha being the first act to perform at the venue. On August 22, 2022, it was announced that MegaCorp Logistics had bought the naming rights for the venue, renaming it to the MegaCorp Pavilion.
