= Slammiversary XI =

2013 Total Nonstop Action Wrestling pay-per-view event

- Promotional poster featuring Sting and Bully Ray
- Promotion: Total Nonstop Action Wrestling
- Date: June 2, 2013
- City: Boston, Massachusetts
- Venue: Agganis Arena
- Attendance: 3,800
- Tagline: TNA's Biggest Event of the Summer

Pay-per-view chronology
← Previous; Lockdown	Next → Bound for Glory

Slammiversary chronology
← Previous; 10	Next → XII

Slammiversary XI was a professional wrestling pay-per-view (PPV) event produced by the Total Nonstop Action Wrestling (TNA) promotion, which took place on June 2, 2013 at the Agganis Arena in Boston, Massachusetts. It was the 11th anniversary celebration for TNA, and the ninth PPV under the Slammiversary chronology. Slammiversary XI was also the third event in TNA's 2013 pay-per-view schedule, following TNA Genesis 2013, TNA Lockdown 2013.

Nine matches were featured on the card. The main event consisted of Bully Ray defeating Sting to retain the TNA World Heavyweight Championship in a No Holds Barred match with the stipulation that if Sting lost, he could no longer compete for the world title. In the other primary bouts, Kurt Angle (who was announced for induction into the TNA Hall of Fame) defeated A.J. Styles, Taryn Terrell defeated Gail Kim in a Last Knockout Standing match and Gunner and James Storm defeated Bobby Roode and Austin Aries, Chavo Guerrero Jr. and Hernandez and Bad Influence (Christopher Daniels and Kazarian) in a Four-way elimination tag team match to win the TNA World Tag Team Championship.

In October 2017, with the launch of the Global Wrestling Network, the event became available to stream on demand.

== Production ==
Other on-screen personnel
Commentator	Todd Keneley
Commentator	Mike Tenay
Commentator	Taz
Ring announcer	Jeremy Borash
Referee	Rudy Charles
Referee	Mark "Slick" Johnson
Referee	Andrew Thomas
Interviewers	Jeremy Borash

=== Background ===
During the Lockdown Fanfest held in San Antonio, Texas on March 9, 2013, TNA President Dixie Carter announced that this year's Slammiversary would take place at the Agganis Arena in Boston, Massachusetts on June 2, 2013. In the press release that followed, Carter stated, "Slammiversary is our biggest show of the summer, and we're so excited to bring it to Boston for the first time.", and finished up by saying, "The Northeast has such a great connection to the world of professional wrestling, and we can't wait to showcase the Impact Wrestling Superstars to this audience, not to mention celebrate our company's 11th anniversary." Tickets for the event went on sale March 29, 2013. The Slammiversary Fan InterAction, held annually, will give TNA fans the chance to get close and personal with their favorite stars in the company for autographs, photographs, and conversing on June 1, 2013, a day before the event.

=== Storylines ===
Slammiversary featured nine professional wrestling matches that involved different wrestlers from pre-existing scripted feuds and storylines. Wrestlers portrayed villains, heroes, or less distinguishable characters in the scripted events that built tension and culminated in a wrestling match or series of matches.

The headlining angle at the event was Sting versus TNA World Heavyweight Champion Bully Ray for the title. Matt Morgan criticized TNA General Manager Hulk Hogan for his mistakes, including that he mistakenly placed his trust in Bully Ray, who joined the rebel group Aces & Eights and won the world title on March 10 at Lockdown 2013. Presenting himself to Hogan as the "ultimate solution", Morgan campaigned to help Hogan against the Aces & Eights if in turn, he received a shot at the TNA World Title. However, Sting, who was unceremoniously discharged by Hogan for having a wrongful judgement of Bully Ray in the past, returned to help his comrade Hogan combat the threat of the Aces & Eights. Hogan subsequently reconciled with Sting and scheduled Sting and Morgan in a contender's match to the TNA World Heavyweight Championship, which Sting won after Morgan passed out to the Scorpion Death Lock. Sting and Bully Ray later met for the contract signing to their match, where Sting chose to compete in a No Holds Barred match and agreed to Ray's stipulation that if he lost, he could no longer compete for the world title.

A primary featured feud was between A.J. Styles and Kurt Angle. In March 2013, A.J. Styles returned to TNA following a 3-month hiatus and portrayed a darker, more silent, lone wolf persona after a past year of setbacks. Many wrestlers attempted to reach out to him, including James Storm, Aces & Eights, Bad Influence, Hulk Hogan, Sting, and his former rival and tag team partner Kurt Angle, some of whom caused his problems. Angle, however, became irritated by Styles' behavior of walking out and not picking a side to support between TNA and the rebel group, Aces & Eights, which led to a brawl between the two. Eventually Hogan, giving up on trying to reason with Styles, pit Styles to compete against Angle at Slammiversary.

In February 2013, Bobby Roode and Austin Aries won the TNA World Tag Team Championship and defended them until April, when Chavo Guerrero Jr. and Hernandez defeated them to regain the titles they lost. Amidst the rivalry for the tag titles was Bad Influence (Christopher Daniels and Kazarian), who had lost the championships back on October 14 at Bound for Glory 2012 to who now were the newest champions. After a series of confrontations and matches between all three teams, with two teams trying to gain championship contention, James Storm entered the scene. Storm officiated a match between Bad Influence and Roode and Aries, during which he opposed and attacked competitors in the match, leaving it to end in a no-contest. Storm soon announced a four-way elimination tag team title match, pitting all three teams against him and a mystery partner, later revealed to be a returning Gunner.

The feud between Team TNA and Aces & Eights continued after the Lockdown PPV. When Magnus was attacked by Aces & Eights members DOC and Knux prior to his TNA Television Championship match with defending champion Devon, Samoa Joe made the save taking Magnus' spot in the match, but ultimately lost to Devon due to interference from the rest of the Aces & Eights group. Several weeks later, Joe made his return from absence helping Magnus once again from a 3-on-1 onslaught. Later it was announced that DOC, Wes Brisco and Garett Bischoff would face Joe, Magnus and a returning Jeff Hardy, who was sidelined by a hammer shot from Aces & Eights leader, Bully Ray.

In May 2013, Chris Sabin returned from one of two torn ACL injuries that sidelined him for close to a year. Upon his return, Sabin momentously fought and defeated Sonjay Dutt and Zema Ion to earn a spot in the newly incorporated three-way format for the TNA X Division Championship. During his public address about his injuries and return to the X Division, Sabin was confronted by arrogant X Division Champion Kenny King, setting up a feud. When Suicide made his return, he defeated Petey Williams and Joey Ryan to earn his place in the three-way.

At Lockdown, Knockouts referee Taryn Terrell reached a high point of conflict with Gail Kim, which stemmed from Kim having issues with how Terrell officiated matches. As a result, Terrell attacked and cost Kim her match with champion Velvet Sky for the TNA Women's Knockout Championship. Due to breaching her probation, TNA Knockouts Executive, Brooke Hogan, relieved Terrell of her referee duties and reinstated her as a wrestler, allowing Terrell and Kim to further feud. Their match at Slammiversary was later scheduled to be a Last Knockout Standing match.

A feud between Joseph Park and TNA Television Champion Devon had the belt hanging in the balance. Following an attack from the Aces & Eights group to Joseph Park, this became the catalyst for the return of his brother Abyss to manhandle the group. Park later got into words with Devon over how the Aces & Eights treated him, ending with Park getting angered and competitive towards Devon.

After winning contracts into the promotion through the TNA Gut Check challenge in 2012, TNA Held a 4-man Gut Check tournament to decide which Gut Check winner would compete in the Bound for Glory Series, Jay Bradley returned to television and defeated Christian York for a shot in the upcoming Bound for Glory Series. The following week, Sam Shaw returned and won his shot by default against Alex Silva, who was attacked and left unconscious by the Aces & Eights.

== Results ==
No.	Results	Stipulations	Times
1	Chris Sabin defeated Kenny King (c) and Suicide	Ultimate X match for the TNA X Division Championship	15:25
2	Jeff Hardy, Magnus and Samoa Joe defeated Aces & Eights (Garett Bischoff, Mr. Anderson and Wes Brisco)	Six-man tag team match	10:08
3	Jay Bradley defeated Sam Shaw	Gut Check Final to qualify for the 2013 Bound For Glory Series	04:57
4	Devon (c) (with Knux) defeated Joseph Park by countout	Singles match for the TNA Television Championship	00:32
5	Abyss defeated Devon (c) (with Knux)	Singles match for the TNA Television Championship	04:50
6	Gunner and James Storm defeated Austin Aries and Bobby Roode, Bad Influence (Christopher Daniels and Kazarian) and Chavo Guerrero and Hernandez (c)	Four-way elimination match for the TNA World Tag Team Championship	16:43
7	Taryn Terrell defeated Gail Kim	Last Knockout Standing match with ODB as special guest referee	09:21
8	Kurt Angle defeated A.J. Styles	Singles match	15:45
9	Bully Ray (c) defeated Sting	Last Chance No Holds Barred match for the TNA World Heavyweight Championship; Since Sting lost, he could never challenge for the TNA World Heavyweight Championship again	14:23
(c) / – the champion(s) heading into the match

=== Gut Check Tournament bracket ===
Semifinals
1	Alex Silva
4	Sam Shaw
3	Christian York	3:58
2	Jay Bradley	Pin

Final
Sam Shaw	Pin
Jay Bradley	4:57

=== Four-way elimination tag team match ===
Elimination	Team	Eliminated by	Elimination move	Time
1	Bad Influence (Christopher Daniels and Kazarian)	Disqualified	Disqualified after Daniels was caught hitting Guerrero with the tag team title belt.	11:09
2	Chavo Guerrero and Hernandez (c)	Aries	Aries pinned Guerrero after Daniels hit him with the tag team title belt	11:31
3	Austin Aries and Bobby Roode	Gunner	Aries submitted to the Gun Rack	16:43
Winners:	Gunner and James Storm			

== See also ==
- 2013 in professional wrestling
