= 2013 in professional wrestling =

2013 in professional wrestling describes the year's events in the world of professional wrestling.

== List of notable promotions ==
These promotions held notable events in 2013.

Promotion Name	Abbreviation	Notes
Consejo Mundial de Lucha Libre	CMLL	
Juggalo Championship Wrestling	JCW	
Lucha Libre AAA Worldwide	AAA	The "AAA" abbreviation has been used since the mid-1990s and had previously stood for the promotion's original name Asistencia Asesoría y Administración.
New Japan Pro-Wrestling	NJPW	
Pro Wrestling Guerrilla	PWG	
Pro Wrestling Noah	NOAH	
Ring of Honor	ROH	
Total Nonstop Action Wrestling	TNA	
World Wrestling Council	WWC	
WWE	—	WWE stands for World Wrestling Entertainment, which is still the legal name, but the company ceased using the full name in April 2011, with the WWE abbreviation becoming an orphaned initialism. NXT served as WWE's developmental territory.

== Calendar of notable shows ==
=== January ===
Date	Promotion(s)	Event	Location	Main event	Notes
4	NJPW	Wrestle Kingdom 7	Tokyo	Hiroshi Tanahashi (c) defeated Kazuchika Okada in a Singles match to retain the IWGP Heavyweight Championship	
6	WWC	Euphoria	Bayamon, Puerto Rico	Ricky Banderas vs. Apolo	
12	TNA	One Night Only: X-Travaganza	Orlando	Samoa Joe vs. Austin Aries	Aired on PPV on May 3.
12	TNA	One Night Only: Joker's Wild	Orlando	Samoa Joe vs. Austin Aries	Aired on PPV on May 3.
13	TNA	Genesis	Orlando	Jeff Hardy (c) defeated Bobby Roode and Austin Aries in a Triple threat elimination match for the TNA World Heavyweight Championship	
27	WWE	Royal Rumble	Phoenix	The Rock defeated CM Punk (c) to win the WWE Championship	This defeat ended CM Punk's 434 day run as WWE Champion; John Cena won the Royal Rumble match and chose to challenge for the WWE Championship at WrestleMania 29.
(c) – denotes defending champion(s)

=== February ===
Date	Promotion(s)	Event	Location	Main event
10	NJPW	The New Beginning	Hiroshima	Hiroshi Tanahashi (c) defeated Karl Anderson in a Singles match to retain the IWGP Heavyweight Championship
17	WWE	Elimination Chamber	New Orleans	The Rock (c) defeated CM Punk to retain the WWE Championship
(c) – denotes defending champion(s)

=== March ===
Date	Promotion(s)	Event	Location	Main event
2	ROH	ROH 11th Anniversary Show	Chicago Ridge	Kevin Steen (c) defeated Jay Lethal in a Singles match to retain the ROH World Championship
10	TNA	Lockdown	San Antonio	Bully Ray defeated Jeff Hardy (c) in a Steel Cage match to win the TNA World Heavyweight Championship
17	AAA	Rey de Reyes	Monterrey, Mexico	Three-way elimination Rey de Reyes tournament final match
17	TNA	One Night Only: Knockouts Knockdown	Orlando	Knockouts Gauntlet match
17	TNA	One Night Only: 10 Reunion	Orlando	Samoa Joe vs. Kurt Angle
17	TNA	One Night Only: Hardcore Justice	Orlando	Jeff Hardy and Brother Runt vs. Team 3D (Bully Ray and Devon)
18	TNA	One Night Only: World Cup	Orlando	Five-on-Five Elimination Tag Team match
18	TNA	One Night Only: Tag Team Tournament	Orlando	Austin Aries and Bobby Roode vs. Team 3D (Bully Ray and Devon)
19	TNA	One Night Only: Tournament of Champions	Orlando	Bobby Roode vs. Samoa Joe
(c) – denotes defending champion(s)

=== April ===
Date	Promotion(s)	Event	Location	Main event
5	ROH	Supercard of Honor VII	New York City	Jay Briscoe defeated Kevin Steen (c) in a Singles match to win the ROH World Championship
7	CMLL	Arena Coliseo 70th Anniversary Show	Mexico City	Dragón Rojo, Jr. (c) defeated La Sombra in a Best two-out-of-three falls match for the CMLL World Middleweight Championship
7	NJPW	Invasion Attack	Tokyo	Kazuchika Okada defeated Hiroshi Tanahashi (c) in a Singles match to win the IWGP Heavyweight Championship
7	WWE	WrestleMania 29	East Rutherford	John Cena defeated The Rock (c) to win the WWE Championship
26	CMLL	57. Aniversario de Arena México	Mexico City, Mexico	Último Guerrero, Volador Jr., and El Terrible defeated Máscara Dorada, Rush, and La Sombra by disqualification — two falls to one in a Best two-out-of-three falls six-man Lucha Libre rules tag team match
(c) – denotes defending champion(s)

=== May ===
Date	Promotion(s)	Event	Location	Main event
3	NJPW	Wrestling Dontaku	Fukuoka	Kazuchika Okada (c) defeated Minoru Suzuki in a Singles match to retain the IWGP Heavyweight Championship
4	ROH	Border Wars	Toronto	Jay Briscoe (c) defeated Adam Cole in a Singles match to retain the ROH World Championship
11	NOAH	Final Burning in Budokan	Tokyo	Jun Akiyama, Keiji Mutoh, Kensuke Sasaki and Kenta Kobashi defeated Go Shiozaki, Kenta, Maybach Taniguchi and Yoshinobu Kanemaru
19	WWE	Extreme Rules	St. Louis	Brock Lesnar defeated Triple H in a Steel Cage match
(c) – denotes defending champion(s)

=== June ===
Date	Promotion(s)	Event	Location	Main event
2	CMLL	Sin Salida	Mexico City, Mexico	Steel cage elimination match Lucha de Apuestas
2	TNA	Slammiversary	Boston	Bully Ray (c) defeated Sting in No Holds Barred match to retain the TNA World Heavyweight Championship
16	AAA	Triplemanía XXI	Mexico City, Mexico	El Hijo del Perro Aguayo defeated Cibernético
16	WWE	Payback	Rosemont	John Cena (c) defeated Ryback 2–1 in a Three Stages of Hell match for the WWE Championship
22	ROH	Best in the World	Baltimore	Jay Briscoe (c) defeated Mark Briscoe in a Singles match to retain the ROH World Championship
22	NJPW	Dominion	Osaka	Kazuchika Okada (c) defeated Togi Makabe in a Singles match to retain the IWGP Heavyweight Championship
(c) – denotes defending champion(s)

=== July ===
Date	Promotion(s)	Event	Location	Main event	Notes
14	WWE	Money in the Bank	Philadelphia	Randy Orton defeated Rob Van Dam, CM Punk, Daniel Bryan, Sheamus, and Christian in a Money in the Bank ladder match for a WWE Championship match contract	This marked Rob Van Dam's return in WWE
29	CMLL	Infierno en el Ring	Mexico City, Mexico	10-man Infierno en el Ring, Lucha de Apuesta Hair vs. Hair Steel cage match	
(c) – denotes defending champion(s)

=== August ===
Date	Promotion(s)	Event	Location	Main event
1-11	NJPW	G1 Climax final	Tokyo	Tetsuya Naito defeated Hiroshi Tanahashi in a G1 Climax tournament
11	JCW	Bloodymania 7	Cave-In-Rock, Illinois	2 Tuff Tony and Vampiro defeated Kongo Kong and The Boogeyman
18	WWE	SummerSlam	Los Angeles	Daniel Bryan defeated John Cena (c) to win the WWE Championship in a Singles match with Triple H as special guest referee, then Randy Orton cashed in his Money in the Bank contract and defeated Daniel Bryan (c) to win the WWE Championship in a Singles match with Triple H as special guest referee
30-31	PWG	Battle of Los Angeles	Reseda, California	Kyle O'Reilly defeated Michael Elgin in a Battle of Los Angeles tournament
(c) – denotes defending champion(s)

=== September ===
Date	Promotion(s)	Event	Location	Main event	Notes
13	CMLL	CMLL 80th Anniversary Show	Mexico City, Mexico	La Sombra defeated Volador Jr. in a Best two-out-of-three falls Lucha de Apuestas, mask vs. mask match	
15	WWE	Night of Champions	Detroit	Daniel Bryan defeated Randy Orton (c) to win the WWE Championship	Due to a controversial finish, Daniel Bryan was stripped of the title the next night on Raw
20	ROH	Death Before Dishonor	Philadelphia	Adam Cole defeated Michael Elgin in Final match to win the ROH World Championship Tournament	
21	WWC	40th WWC Aniversario	Bayamon, Puerto Rico	Sting defeated Carlito	
29	NJPW	Destruction	Kobe	Kazuchika Okada (c) defeated Satoshi Kojima in a Singles match to retain the IWGP Intercontinental Championship	
(c) – denotes defending champion(s)

=== October ===
Date	Promotion(s)	Event	Location	Main event	Notes
6	WWE	Battleground	Buffalo	Randy Orton vs. Daniel Bryan for the vacant WWE Championship ended in a no contest	This event received 114,000 buys worldwide, making it the second lowest number (behind ECW December to Dismember) in the last 17 years
13	NJPW	King of Pro-Wrestling	Tokyo	Kazuchika Okada (c) defeated Hiroshi Tanahashi in a Singles match to retain the IWGP Heavyweight Championship	
18	AAA	Heroes Inmortales	Puebla, Puebla	La Parka defeated Chessman, Fénix and El Hijo del Fantasma	
20	TNA	Bound for Glory	San Diego	A.J. Styles defeated Bully Ray (c) in a No Disqualification match to win the TNA World Heavyweight Championship	Last PPV featuring A.J. Styles in TNA as he left TNA in December
26	ROH	Glory By Honor	Chicago Ridge	Michael Elgin, Jay Lethal, Caprice Coleman and Cedric Alexander defeated Adam Cole, Bobby Fish, Kyle O'Reilly and Matt Taven in Eight-Man Elimination Tag Team match	
27	WWE	Hell in a Cell	Miami	Randy Orton defeated Daniel Bryan in a Hell in a Cell match for the vacant WWE Championship with Shawn Michaels as the special guest referee	
(c) – denotes defending champion(s)

=== November ===
Date	Promotion(s)	Event	Location	Main event
9	NJPW	Power Struggle	Osaka	Kazuchika Okada (c) defeated Karl Anderson in a Singles match to retain the IWGP Heavyweight Championship
24	WWE	Survivor Series	Boston	Randy Orton (c) defeated Big Show in a Singles match to retain the WWE Championship
(c) – denotes defending champion(s)

=== December ===
Date	Promotion(s)	Event	Location	Main event	Notes
11	WWE	Tribute to the Troops	Joint Base Lewis-McChord, Washington	Big Show defeated Damien Sandow in a Singles match	
14	ROH	Final Battle	Manhattan	Adam Cole (c) defeated Michael Elgin and Jay Briscoe in a Three-way match to retain the ROH World Championship	
15	WWE	TLC: Tables, Ladders & Chairs	Houston	Randy Orton (WWE Champion) defeated John Cena (World Heavyweight Champion) in a Tables, Ladders, and Chairs match to unify the championships into the WWE World Heavyweight Championship	This was the final event to feature the World Heavyweight Championship
29	TNA	One Night Only: Hardcore Justice 3	Orlando	Lethal Lockdown match	
30	TNA	One Night Only: #OldSchool	Orlando	Magnus (c) vs. Samoa Joe for the TNA World Heavyweight Championship	
(c) – denotes defending champion(s)

== Accomplishments and tournaments ==
=== AAA ===
Accomplishment	Winner	Date won	Notes
Rey de Reyes	El Mesias	March 18	

=== JWP ===
Accomplishment	Winner	Date won	Notes
Tag League the Best 2013	Dash Chisako and Sendai Sachiko	April 7	

=== Ring of Honor ===
Accomplishment	Winner	Date won	Notes
ROH World Championship Tournament	Adam Cole	September 20	

=== Total Nonstop Action Wrestling ===
Accomplishment	Winner	Date won	Notes
Joker's Wild	James Storm	January 12	
TNA X Division Championship #1 Contender Tournament	Christian York	January 13	
British Boot Camp season 1	Rockstar Spud	January 22	
Knockouts Knockdown	Gail Kim	March 7	
World Cup	Team USA (Christopher Daniels, James Storm, Kazarian, Kenny King, Mickie James)	March 18	
TNA Gut Check Tournament	Jay Bradley	June 2	
Jokers Wild Tag Team Tournament	Magnus	June 30	
TNA X Division Championship Tournament	Manik	July 25	
Turkey Bowl	The BroMans	November 28	
TNA World Heavyweight Championship Tournament	Magnus	December 19	

=== WWE ===
Accomplishment	Winner	Date won	Notes
Royal Rumble Entry Tournament	Bo Dallas	January 26	Tournament was held for a member of NXT to join the Royal Rumble. Dallas last eliminated Leo Kruger to win.
Royal Rumble	John Cena	January 27	Winner received their choice of a championship match for either the WWE Championship or World Heavyweight Championship at WrestleMania 29; Cena last eliminated Ryback and chose to challenge for the WWE Championship, which he subsequently won from The Rock.
NXT Tag Team Championship Tournament	British Ambition (Adrian Neville and Oliver Grey)	January 31 (aired February 13)	Defeated The Wyatt Family (Luke Harper and Erick Rowan) in the tournament final to determine the inaugural NXT Tag Team Champions.
NXT Women's Championship Tournament	Paige	June 20 (aired July 24)	Defeated Emma in the tournament final to determine the inaugural NXT Women's Champion.
Money in the Bank ladder match	Damien Sandow	July 14	Defeated Wade Barrett, Cody Rhodes, Dean Ambrose, Fandango, Antonio Cesaro, and Jack Swagger to win a World Heavyweight Championship match contract. Sandow cashed in on champion John Cena on the October 28 episode of Raw, but was unsuccessful.
Money in the Bank ladder match	Randy Orton	July 14	Defeated Rob Van Dam, CM Punk, Daniel Bryan, Sheamus, and Christian to win a WWE Championship match contract. Orton cashed in the contract at SummerSlam and won the title from Daniel Bryan, who had just won the title from John Cena.

== Title changes ==
=== AAA ===
AAA Mega Championship
Incoming champion – El Texano, Jr.
No title changes

AAA Fusion Championship
Incoming champion – N/A
Date	Winner	Event/Show	Note(s)
March 17	Fenix	Rey de Reyes	

AAA Latin American Championship
Incoming champion – L.A. Park
Date	Winner	Event/Show	Note(s)
May 23	Vacated	N/A	
June 16	Blue Demon, Jr.	Triplemanía XXI	

AAA World Mini-Estrella Championship
Incoming champion – Mini Psicosis
Date	Winner	Event/Show	Note(s)
February 18	Dinastía	Sin Límite	

AAA World Cruiserweight Championship
Incoming champion – Daga
No title changes

AAA Reina de Reinas Championship
Incoming champion – Sexy Star
Date	Winner	Event/Show	Note(s)
February 19	Vacated	N/A	
March 17	Faby Apache	Rey de Reyes	

AAA World Tag Team Championship
Incoming champions – Joe Líder and Vampiro
Date	Winner	Event/Show	Note(s)
May 22	Vacated	N/A	
June 16	Mexican Powers (Crazy Boy and Joe Líder)	Triplemanía XXI	
October 18	Los Güeros del Cielo (Angélico and Jack Evans)	Héroes Inmortales VII	

AAA World Mixed Tag Team Championship
Incoming champions – Halloween and Mari Apache
Date	Winner	Event/Show	Note(s)
July 19	Drago and Faby Apache	AAA Television Taping	

AAA World Trios Championship
Incoming champions – El Consejo (Máscara Año 2000 Jr., El Texano Jr. and Toscano)
Date	Winner	Event/Show	Note(s)
February 18	Los Psycho Circus (Monster Clown, Murder Clown and Psycho Clown)	Sin Límite	

=== NJPW ===
IWGP Heavyweight Championship
Incoming champion – Hiroshi Tanahashi
Date	Winner	Event/Show	Note(s)
April 7	Kazuchika Okada	Invasion Attack	

IWGP Intercontinental Championship
Incoming champion – Shinsuke Nakamura
Date	Winner	Event/Show	Note(s)
May 31	La Sombra	Super Viernes	
July 20	Shinsuke Nakamura	Kizuna Road 2013	

IWGP Tag Team Championship
Incoming champions – K.E.S. (Davey Boy Smith Jr. and Lance Archer)
Date	Winner	Event/Show	Note(s)
May 3	Tencozy (Hiroyoshi Tenzan and Satoshi Kojima)	Wrestling Dontaku 2013	This was a four-way match, which also included Chaos (Takashi Iizuka and Toru Yano) and Muscle Orchestra (Manabu Nakanishi and Strong Man).
November 9	K.E.S. (Davey Boy Smith Jr. and Lance Archer)	Power Struggle	This was the second fall of a two-fall three-way tornado tag team match which also included The IronGodz (Jax Dane and Rob Conway).

IWGP Junior Heavyweight Championship
Incoming champion – Prince Devitt
No title changes

IWGP Junior Heavyweight Tag Team Championship
Incoming champions – Time Splitters (Alex Shelley and Kushida)
Date	Winner	Event/Show	Note(s)
May 3	Forever Hooligans (Alex Koslov and Rocky Romero)	Wrestling Dontaku 2013	
October 14	Suzuki-gun (Taichi and Taka Michinoku)	King of Pro-Wrestling	

NEVER Openweight Championship
Incoming champion – Masato Tanaka
Date	Winner	Event/Show	Note(s)
September 29	Tetsuya Naito	Destruction	Naito's Tokyo Dome IWGP Heavyweight Championship challenge rights certificate was also on the line.

=== ROH ===
ROH World Championship
Incoming champion – Kevin Steen
Date	Winner	Event/Show	Note(s)
April 5	Jay Briscoe	Supercard of Honor VII	
July 3	Vacated	N/A	
September 20	Adam Cole	Death Before Dishonor XI	

ROH World Television Championship
Incoming champion – Adam Cole
Date	Winner	Event/Show	Note(s)
March 2	Matt Taven	11th Anniversary Show	
December 14	Tommaso Ciampa	Final Battle 2013	

ROH World Tag Team Championship
Incoming champions – The Briscoe Brothers (Jay and Mark Briscoe)
Date	Winner	Event/Show	Note(s)
March 2	reDRagon (Bobby Fish and Kyle O'Reilly)	Border Wars	
July 27	Forever Hooligans (Alex Koslov and Rocky Romero)	Ring of Honor Wrestling	
August 3	The American Wolves (Davey Richards and Eddie Edwards)	All-Star Extravaganza V	
August 17	reDRagon (Bobby Fish and Kyle O'Reilly)	Manhattan Mayhem V	

=== The Crash Lucha Libre ===
The Crash Cruiserweight Championship
(Title created)
Date	Winner	Event/Show	Note(s)
June 14	Fénix	The Crash show	Defeated Ángel Metálico, Flamita, Pentagón Jr., Star Boy, Tony Casanova, Willie Mack and X-Torm in eight-way elimination match to become the inaugural champion.

=== TNA ===
TNA World Heavyweight Championship
Incoming champion – Jeff Hardy
Date	Winner	Event/Show	Note(s)
March 10	Bully Ray	Lockdown	This was a steel cage match
July 18	Chris Sabin	Destination X	Sabin voluntarily relinquished the TNA X Division Championship in exchange for a TNA World Heavyweight Championship match at this event.
August 15	Bully Ray	Hardcore Justice	This was a steel cage match
October 20	A.J. Styles	Bound for Glory	This was a no disqualification match
October 29	Vacated	—	TNA President Dixie Carter announced via Twitter that Styles had been stripped of the title due to a contract dispute. Styles continued to carry around the championship belt proclaiming himself champion in the storyline
December 3 (aired December 19)	Magnus	Final Resolution	Defeated Jeff Hardy in a tournament final to win the vacant title. This was a Dixieland match. On the January 9, 2014 episode of Impact Wrestling (taped December 6, 2013), A.J. Styles returned claiming to be the legitimate TNA World Heavyweight Champion as he was never defeated for the title (though not recognized as such by TNA). Magnus defeated him later that night to become the undisputed champion

TNA X Division Championship
Incoming champion – Rob Van Dam
Date	Winner	Event/Show	Note(s)
February 28	Kenny King	Impact Wrestling	
June 2	Chris Sabin	Slammiversary XI	
June 20	Austin Aries	Impact Wrestling	
June 29	Chris Sabin	Impact Wrestling	
June 29	Vacated	Impact Wrestling	Chris Sabin voluntarily relinquished the title in exchange for a TNA World Heavyweight Championship match at Destination X.
July 18	Manik	Impact Wrestling	
October 20	Chris Sabin	Bound for Glory	
November 23	Austin Aries	Impact Wrestling	
December 5	Chris Sabin	Impact Wrestling	

TNA World Tag Team Championship
Incoming champions – Chavo Guerrero and Hernandez
Date	Winner	Event/Show	Note(s)
January 25	Bobby Roode and Austin Aries	Impact Wrestling	
April 11	Chavo Guerrero and Hernandez	Impact Wrestling	
June 2	Gunner and James Storm	Slammiversary XI	
October 20	The BroMans (Robbie E and Jessie Godderz)	Bound for Glory	

TNA Knockouts Tag Team Championship
Incoming champions – Eric Young and ODB
Date	Winner	Event/Show	Note(s)
June 20	Vacated	Impact Wrestling	
June 27	Deactivated	N/A	

TNA Knockouts Championship
Incoming champion – Tara
Date	Winner	Event/Show	Note(s)
January 26	Velvet Sky	Impact Wrestling	
May 23	Mickie James	Impact Wrestling	
September 12	ODB	No Surrender	
October 20	Gail Kim	Bound for Glory	

TNA Television Championship
Incoming champion – Devon
Date	Winner	Event/Show	Note(s)
June 2	Abyss	Slammiversary XI	

=== WWE ===
WWE Championship
Incoming champion – CM Punk
Date	Winner	Event/Show	Note(s)
January 27	The Rock	Royal Rumble	CM Punk had initially won, but the match was then restarted by Mr. McMahon due to interference by The Shield.
April 7	John Cena	WrestleMania 29	
August 18	Daniel Bryan	SummerSlam	Triple H was the special guest referee.
August 18	Randy Orton	SummerSlam	Cashed in his Money in the Bank contract. Triple H was the special guest referee.
September 15	Daniel Bryan	Night of Champions	
September 16	Vacated	Monday Night Raw	Vacated after a controversial finish when Daniel Bryan defeated Randy Orton to win the title. A subsequent match for the vacant title at Battleground between Bryan and Orton ended in a no contest.
October 27	Randy Orton	Hell in a Cell	Defeated Daniel Bryan in a Hell in a Cell match for the vacant title with Shawn Michaels serving as the special guest referee.
On December 15, 2013 at TLC: Tables, Ladders & Chairs, Orton defeated John Cena to unify the World Heavyweight Championship with the WWE Championship. The World Heavyweight Championship was retired and the WWE Championship became known as the WWE World Heavyweight Championship.

World Heavyweight Championship
Incoming champion – Big Show
Date	Winner	Event/Show	Note(s)
January 8 (aired January 11)	Alberto Del Rio	SmackDown	Last Man Standing match.
April 8	Dolph Ziggler	Monday Night Raw	Cashed in his Money in the Bank contract.
June 16	Alberto Del Rio	Payback	
October 27	John Cena	Hell in a Cell	
December 15	Randy Orton	TLC: Tables, Ladders & Chairs	This was a Tables, Ladders, and Chairs title unification match, where Orton also defended his WWE Championship.
December 15	Retired	TLC: Tables, Ladders & Chairs	After Randy Orton defeated John Cena to unify the World Heavyweight Championship with the WWE Championship, the World Heavyweight Championship was retired and the WWE Championship became the WWE World Heavyweight Championship.

WWE Intercontinental Championship
Incoming champion – Wade Barrett
Date	Winner	Event/Show	Note(s)
April 7	The Miz	WrestleMania 29; Pre-Show	
April 8	Wade Barrett	Monday Night Raw	
June 16	Curtis Axel	Payback	Triple threat match, also involving The Miz.
November 18	Big E Langston	Monday Night Raw	

WWE United States Championship
Incoming champion – Antonio Cesaro
Date	Winner	Event/Show	Note(s)
April 15	Kofi Kingston	Monday Night Raw	
May 19	Dean Ambrose	Extreme Rules	

WWE Divas Championship
Incoming champion – Eve Torres
Date	Winner	Event/Show	Note(s)
January 14	Kaitlyn	Raw 20th Anniversary Special	
June 16	AJ Lee	Payback	

WWE Tag Team Championship
Incoming champions – Team Hell No (Kane and Daniel Bryan)
Date	Winner	Event/Show	Note(s)
May 19	The Shield (Seth Rollins and Roman Reigns)	Extreme Rules	Tornado Tag Team match
October 14	Cody Rhodes and Goldust	Monday Night Raw	No-disqualification match

==== NXT ====
NXT Championship
Incoming champion – Big E Langston
Date	Winner	Event/Show	Note(s)
May 23 (aired June 12)	Bo Dallas	NXT	

NXT Women's Championship
(Title created)
Date	Winner	Event/Show	Note(s)
June 20 (aired July 24)	Paige	NXT	Defeated Emma in the tournament final to become the inaugural champion.

NXT Tag Team Championship
(Title created)
Date	Winner	Event/Show	Note(s)
January 31 (aired February 13)	British Ambition (Adrian Neville and Oliver Grey)	NXT	Defeated The Wyatt Family (Luke Harper and Erick Rowan) in the tournament final to become the inaugural champions. Bo Dallas replaced Grey when he was injured, but was not considered champion.
May 2 (aired May 8)	The Wyatt Family (Luke Harper and Erick Rowan)	NXT	Bo Dallas filled in for an injured Oliver Grey.
June 20 (aired July 17)	Adrian Neville and Corey Graves	NXT	
September 12 (aired October 2)	The Ascension (Conor O'Brian and Rick Victor)	NXT	During their reign, their ring names were shortened to Konnor and Viktor, respectively.

== Awards and honors ==
=== AAA Hall of Fame ===
Inductee
Abismo Negro

=== Pro Wrestling Illustrated ===
Category	Winner
Wrestler of the Year	Daniel Bryan
Tag Team of the Year	The Shield (Seth Rollins and Roman Reigns)
Match of the Year	John Cena vs. Daniel Bryan (SummerSlam)
Feud of the Year	The Shield vs. Team Hell No
Most Popular Wrestler of the Year	Daniel Bryan
Most Hated Wrestler of the Year	The Authority
Comeback of the Year	Goldust
Most Improved Wrestler of the Year	Magnus
Inspirational Wrestler of the Year	Darren Young
Rookie of the Year	Tim Zbyszko
Woman of the Year	AJ Lee
Stanley Weston Award (Lifetime Achievement)	Dusty Rhodes

=== TNA Hall of Fame ===
Inductee
Kurt Angle

=== Wrestling Observer Newsletter ===
==== Wrestling Observer Newsletter Hall of Fame ====
Inductee
Takashi Matsunaga
Henri Deglane
Dr. Wagner
Atlantis
Kensuke Sasaki
Hiroshi Tanahashi

==== Wrestling Observer Newsletter awards ====
Category	Winner
Wrestler of the Year	Hiroshi Tanahashi
Most Outstanding	Hiroshi Tanahashi
Feud of the Year	Hiroshi Tanahashi vs. Kazuchika Okada
Tag Team of the Year	The Shield (Seth Rollins and Roman Reigns)
Most Improved	Roman Reigns
Best on Interviews	Paul Heyman

=== WWE ===
==== WWE Hall of Fame ====
Category	Inductee	Inducted by
Individual	Mick Foley	Terry Funk
Individual	Bob Backlund	Maria Menounos
Individual	Trish Stratus	Stephanie McMahon
Individual	Bruno Sammartino	Arnold Schwarzenegger
Individual	Booker T	Stevie Ray
Celebrity	Donald Trump	Vince McMahon

==== Slammy Awards ====
Poll	Winner
"What a Maneuver!" Award	Roman Reigns' Spear
Faction of the Year	The Shield (Dean Ambrose, Seth Rollins, and Roman Reigns)
"You Still Got It!" Best Superstar Return	Goldust
Couple of the Year	Daniel Bryan and Brie Bella
Tag Team of the Year	Cody Rhodes and Goldust
Feat of Strength of the Year	Mark Henry pulls two trucks with his bare hands
"Say What?!" Quote of the Year	"One stipulation: I'm in my boys' corner and I'll be your huckleberry all night long." – Dusty Rhodes
Best Dance Moves	The Funkadactyls (Naomi and Cameron)
Favorite Web Show	The JBL and Cole Show
Best Crowd of the Year	Raw after WrestleMania (East Rutherford, New Jersey)
Catchphrase of the Year	"YES! YES! YES!" – Daniel Bryan
Trending Now (Hashtag of the Year)	The Shield's #BelieveInTheShield^{a}
"THIS IS AWESOME!" Moment of the Year	Big Show knocks out Triple H on Raw
Breakout Star of the Year	The Shield (Dean Ambrose, Seth Rollins, and Roman Reigns)
Beard of the Year	Daniel Bryan
"LOL!" Moment of the Year	The Rock Concert at the 20th Anniversary of Raw (January 14)
Double-Cross of the Year	Shawn Michaels turns on Daniel Bryan and costs him the WWE Championship at Hell in a Cell
Diva of the Year	The Bella Twins (Brie Bella and Nikki Bella)
Superstar of the Year	Daniel Bryan
Fan Participation of the Year	Yes! Yes! Yes!
Insult of the Year	Stephanie McMahon insults Big Show
Extreme Moment of the Year	CM Punk exacts vengeance on Paul Heyman at Hell in a Cell
Match of the Year	The Rock vs. John Cena for the WWE Championship – WrestleMania 29

== Debuts ==
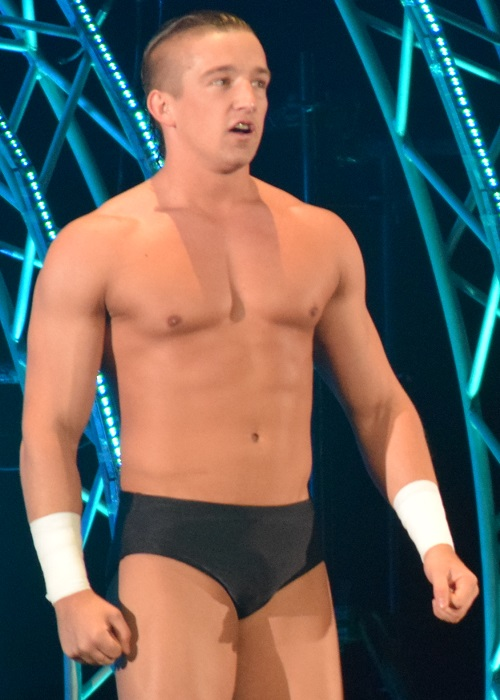
Jay White

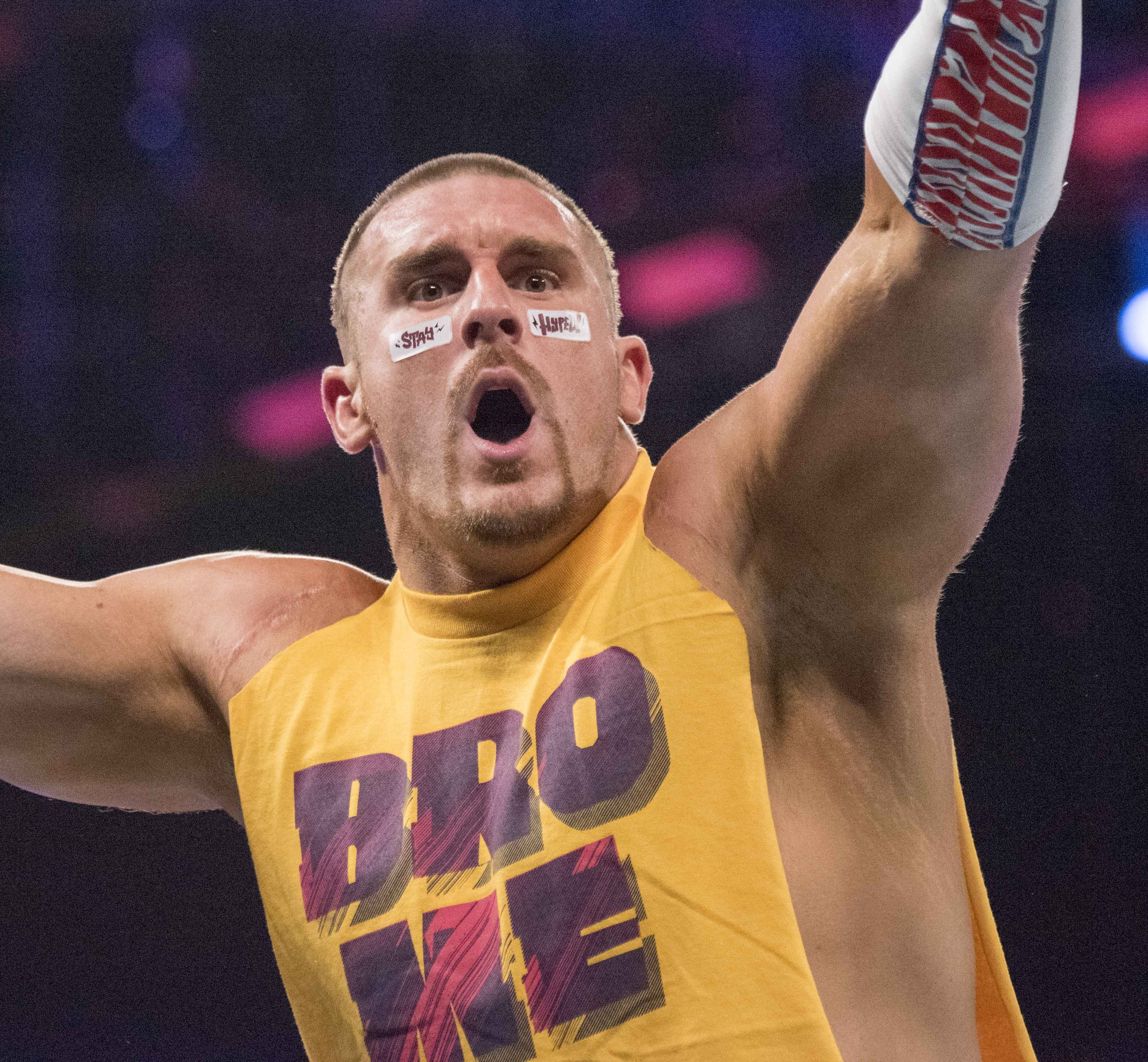
Mojo Rawley

- January 3 – Rutsuko Yamaguchi (Ice Ribbon)
- January 8 – Dan Moloney
- January 20 – Aliyah
- February 19 – Jay White
- February 23 – Kotori
- March 24 – The Rotation
- March 29 – Renee Young
- April 14 – U-T
- May 17 – No Way Jose
- May 25
  - Akane Fujita
  - Big Boss Shimizu
- May 29 – Mojo Rawley
- June 20 – Alexa Bliss
- June 26 – JoJo
- June 29 – JD Drake
- July 1 – Eva Marie
- July 6 – Laurance Roman
- August 3 – Lana Austin
- August 12 – Anthony Gangone
- August 17 – KANNA (TJPW)
- August 18
  - Saki Akai
  - Yako Fujigasaki
- August 23 – Koyuki Hayashi (Ice Ribbon)
- August 25 – Kyuri
- August 31 – Mike D Vecchio
- September – Carmella
- September 6 – Ace Romero
- September 28 - Ayame Yabe (Ice Ribbon)
- October 6 - AZM
- October 23 – Lana
- November 3 – Keisuke Okuda
- November 4
  - Koguma
  - Rina Yamashita
- November 9 – Kid Lykos
- November 19 – LEONA
- December 1 – Ayumi Takada (TJPW)
- December 6 – Deonna Purrazzo
- December 14 – Kona Reeves
- December 15 – Takayuki Ueki
- December 31 – Bin Wang (IGF and NXT)

== Retirements ==
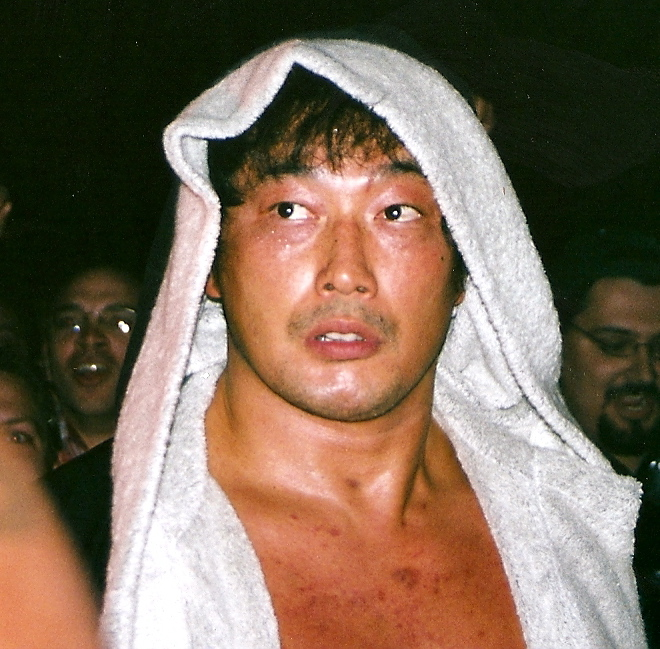
Kenta Kobashi

- Butch Reed (1978-2013)
- Diane Von Hoffman (1981–2013)
- Viscera (1991–2013)
- Eve Torres (October 29, 2007 – January 14, 2013)
- Robbie Ellis (1966-March 22, 2013)
- Jerry Lynn (March 23, 1988 – March 23, 2013)
- Frank Durso (1961-March 23, 2013)
- Big Bully Busick (1977-April 19, 2013)
- Kenta Kobashi (February 26, 1988 – May 11, 2013)
- Epiphany (October 2008 – July 4, 2013)
- Natsumi Showzuki (January 2012 – July 31, 2013) (returned to wrestling in 2021)
- Ayumi Kurihara (April 24, 2005 – August 4, 2013)
- Ted DiBiase Jr. (2006 – September 1, 2013)
- Yoshihito Sasaki (September 7, 2000 – September 25, 2013)
- Ivan Koloff (1961-November 16, 2013)
- William Regal (1983-November 21, 2013)
- Manny Fernandez (1977-November 30, 2013) (returned to wrestling in 2017)
- Roxxi Laveaux (2002 - December 6, 2013)

== Deaths ==
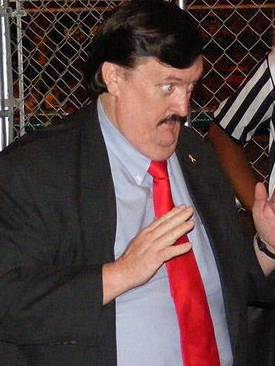
Paul Bearer

- January 11 - Billy Varga, 94
- February 8 - Jim Jefferson, 52
- February 20 - Cyclone Negro, 80
- March 5 – Paul Bearer, 58.
- March 16 - Don Carson, 78
- March 21
  - Moondog Spike, 62.
  - Reid Flair, 25.
- April 18 - Jerry Balisok, 57
- May 22 – Mick McManus, 93
- May 26 – Héctor Garza, 43.
- May 28 - Buck Robley, 68
- June 7 – Mark Starr, 50.
- June 14 – Al Green, 57.
- June 24 – Jackie Fargo, 82.
- June 28 – Matt Borne, 55.
- July 19 - Geeto Mongol, 82
- July 31 - Corey Maclin, 43
- August 3 – Dutch Savage, 78.
- August 14 - Gia Allemand, 29
- September 20 – Angelo Savoldi, 99.
- September 29 – Gene Petit, c.64.
- October 15 – El Brazo, 52.
- October 21 - Randhawa (wrestler), 79/80
- November 4 - Doug Gashouse Gilbert, 76
- November 21 – Mad Dog Vachon, 84.
- December 1 – Garry Robbins, 56
- December 18 - Onno Boelee, 68
- December 19 - Pedro Septién, 97
- December 29 – Ari Romero, 62.

== See also ==
- List of NJPW pay-per-view events
- List of ROH pay-per-view events
- List of TNA pay-per-view events
- List of WWE pay-per-view events
