= TNA Lockdown (2013) =

2013 Total Nonstop Action Wrestling pay-per-view event

Lockdown (2013)
- Promotional poster featuring Bully Ray, Jeff Hardy, Sting, Chavo Guerrero, and Hernandez
- Promotion: Total Nonstop Action Wrestling
- Date: March 10, 2013
- City: San Antonio, Texas
- Venue: Alamodome
- Attendance: 7,200

Pay-per-view chronology
← Previous; Genesis	Next → Slammiversary XI

Lockdown chronology
← Previous; 2012	Next → 2014

The 2013 Lockdown was a professional wrestling pay-per-view (PPV) event produced by the Total Nonstop Action Wrestling (TNA) promotion, which took place on March 10, 2013, at the Alamodome in San Antonio, Texas. It was the ninth under the Lockdown chronology and second event in the 2013 TNA PPV schedule. At 7,200 fans, the event became TNA’s most domestically attended event, beating their previous record from Slammiversary 2012. It would hold the record for over a decade until it was broken at Slammiversary 2025.

From 2005 to 2012, the theme of Lockdown events featured every match taking place inside a Steel Cage. Beginning with this year's event, Lockdown was modified to featuring standard matches, and cage matches were reserved only for the high profile bouts. Lockdown was also moved to March for the first time since its inception in 2005. Eight matches were featured on the card. In the main event, Bully Ray defeated Jeff Hardy in a Steel Cage match for the TNA World Heavyweight Championship.

In October 2017, with the launch of the Global Wrestling Network, the event became available to stream on demand. It would later be available on Impact Plus in May 2019.

== Production ==
Other on-screen personnel
Commentators	Todd Keneley
Commentators	Mike Tenay
Commentators	Taz
Ring announcers	Jeremy Borash (Main event)
Ring announcers	Christy Hemme
Referees	Rudy Charles
Referees	Earl Hebner
Referees	Mark "Slick" Johnson
Referees	Taryn Terrell (Knockouts title match)
Referees	Andrew Thomas
Interviewer	Jeremy Borash

=== Background ===
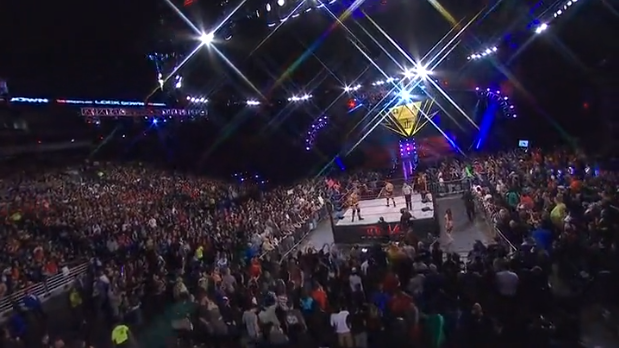
Lockdown 2013 stage design

During the November 29, 2012 Impact Wrestling episode, the location and date for the ninth annual Lockdown event were announced as the Alamodome in San Antonio, Texas on March 10, 2013. In a press release, TNA President Dixie Carter stated, "We have been waiting to play San Antonio until we could bring this great city a big televised event." Tickets for the event went on sale on December 7, 2012.

From January to March 2013, the Road to Lockdown Tour, which TNA holds every year, toured many different cities across the United States and United Kingdom for live events and TV tapings to build up to the Lockdown event. As part of TNA's business initiative to reduce the number of pay-per-views produced per year, Lockdown was moved to March, leaving Genesis, Lockdown, Slammiversary and Bound for Glory as the remaining live PPVs on their schedule. Like every year, TNA arranged their Lockdown VIP Weekend featuring their fan-friendly Lockdown Fanfest, giving the opportunity to fans to get close with their favorite wrestlers for autographs, photographs and conversations on March 9, 2013, a day before the event.

=== Storylines ===
Lockdown featured eight professional wrestling matches that involved different wrestlers from pre-existing scripted feuds and storylines. Wrestlers portrayed villains, heroes, or less distinguishable characters in the scripted events that built tension and culminated in a wrestling match or series of matches.

The main event headlining Lockdown was Bully Ray facing defending champion Jeff Hardy in a Steel Cage match for the TNA World Heavyweight Championship. On the February 14, 2013 edition of Impact Wrestling, the number one contender to the TNA World Heavyweight Championship at Lockdown was determined through a tournament designed to allow the competitors to impress TNA General Manager Hulk Hogan, enabling him to personally select the number one contender. Out of the four matches scheduled, two resulted in a no-contest (Kurt Angle versus Samoa Joe and Bobby Roode versus Austin Aries). In the other matches, Magnus defeated Christopher Daniels and James Storm beat Rob Van Dam. Meanwhile, Brooke Hogan spoke with her father, Hulk Hogan, about her husband Bully Ray wanting to compete for the championship, which Hulk said he would take under advisement. On the same night, before a decision regarding the title contender could be made, the Aces & Eights gang halted the announcement by surrounding Hogan for an attack, but retreated when Bully Ray and Sting came to Hogan's aid with weapons. The next week, in a decision seen as an act of nepotism, Hogan chose his son-in-law Bully Ray, who did not partake in the tournament, as the number one contender to the World Title, disregarding the actual competitors in the tournament.

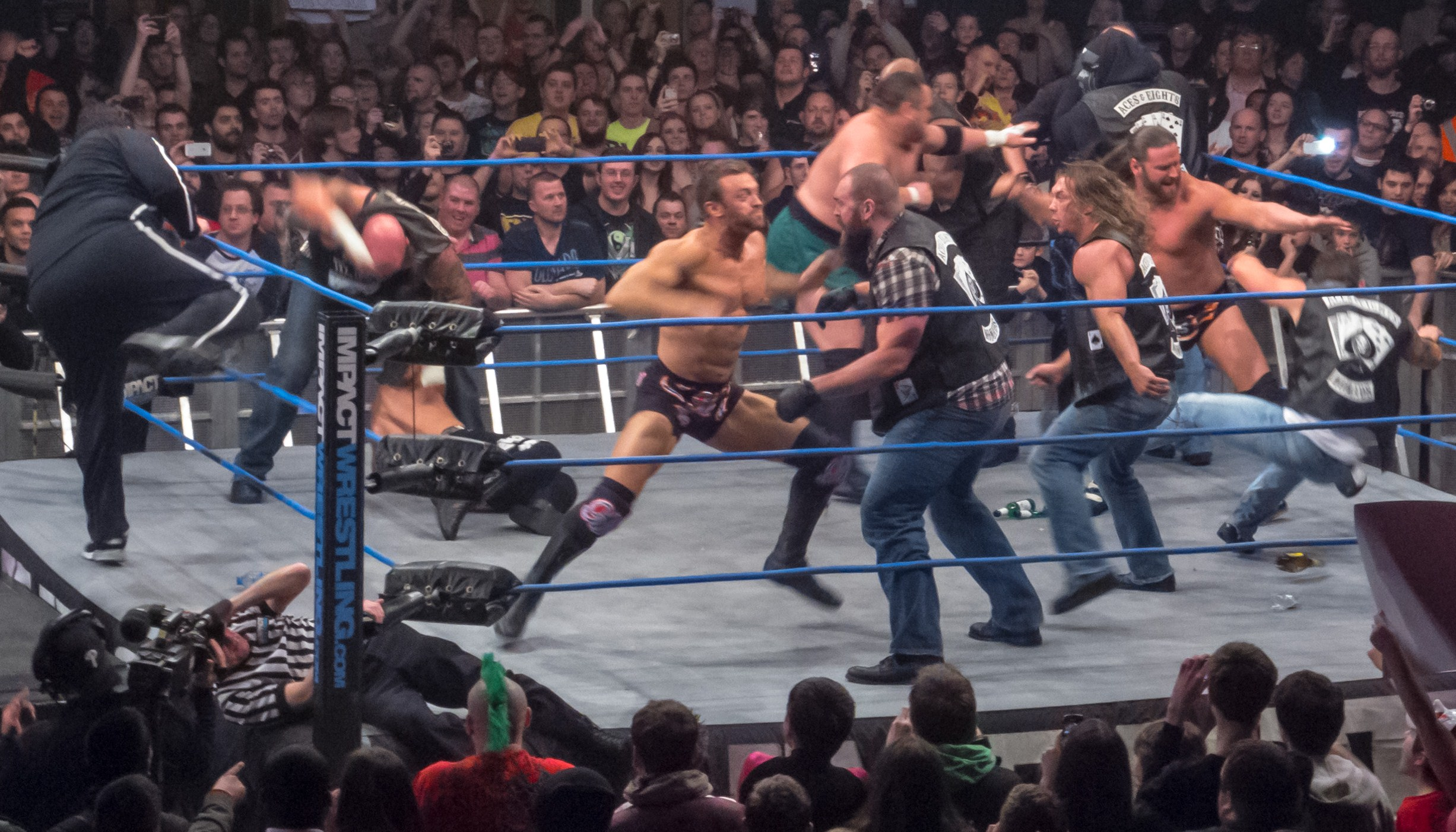
Aces & Eights brawl with the TNA roster.

The ninth annual Lethal Lockdown match took place at Lockdown to showcase the main feud in TNA. This year, for the first time, instead of the cage ceiling (with weapons attached) lowering to indicate the start of the final phase of the Lethal Lockdown match, weapons were brought to the match, where pinfalls and submissions were legal ways to win once all participants had entered. For over 9 months, the masked gang Aces & Eights, beginning with their attacks on Sting and Hulk Hogan, had waged war against TNA and the company's roster through a mixture of all-out brawls and calculated attacks. After holding Sting and Hogan for ransom (in a deal to free attorney Joseph Park, who worked for Hogan to investigate the mysterious gang), Aces & Eights received their chance to win "full access" to the promotion after defeating Sting and Bully Ray on October 14 at Bound for Glory, where a major member of the biker gang was revealed to be Devon, who later cited his groupies, a contract dispute, the anonymous leader of the group who patched him in, and Bully Ray mistreating him and his children in the past as his reasons for joining. Over the next few months, the unmasking and revelations of Aces & Eights members occurred leading to Aces & Eights challenging the TNA roster to "a war to end all wars" at Lockdown. In the following weeks, Aces & Eights assembled their team, captained by Devon. Along with Devon, this team included D.O.C., Mr. Anderson, Knux and Garett Bischoff, and they were to fight against Team TNA captained by Sting which was revealed to include James Storm, Samoa Joe, Magnus, and a returning Eric Young, who was injured months ago by the Aces & Eights.

Another feud was between Kurt Angle and Wes Brisco. After befriending Kurt Angle, Angle helped Brisco to get an opportunity to make it on the TNA roster. Brisco later helped fend off members of the Aces & Eights with a lead pipe to save Angle and Garett Bischoff from getting beat down. Brisco received a chance on talent evaluation segment, TNA Gut Check, winning his try-out match against Bischoff and gaining the majority vote from the judges to become a member of the TNA roster. Under the wing of Angle and Samoa Joe, Brisco and Bischoff aligned with them in their fight against Aces & Eights, winning their match against them on December 9 at Final Resolution. In early January, however, Angle and Joe began to decline the help of Brisco and Bischoff. Weeks later on the January 31 edition of Impact Wrestling, Angle turned down their help again prior to his Lockdown 2010 cage rematch with Mr. Anderson. Just before the match, Joe was shown to have been mysteriously attacked. After Angle's cage match victory over Anderson, a masked member of Aces & Eights scaled the cage to pursue Angle while Brisco emerged to unlock the cage and apparently help Angle. Within the cage, the person unmasked to reveal himself to be Garett Bischoff. Brisco then proceeded to assist Bischoff in assaulting Angle to reveal his alliance with the Aces & Eights and that the two of them were in on the attacks on Angle and Joe. The next week, Bischoff stated that Aces & Eights was his new family and Brisco expressed his spite towards Hogan and having to "start at the bottom" despite being a member of the Brisco wrestling family (he is the son of Gerald Brisco). On the February 21 edition of Impact Wrestling, Angle told Brisco that he was glad to have gotten him a contract because the pain he would inflict would be legal because of it, and in the process, challenged Brisco to a steel cage match at Lockdown.

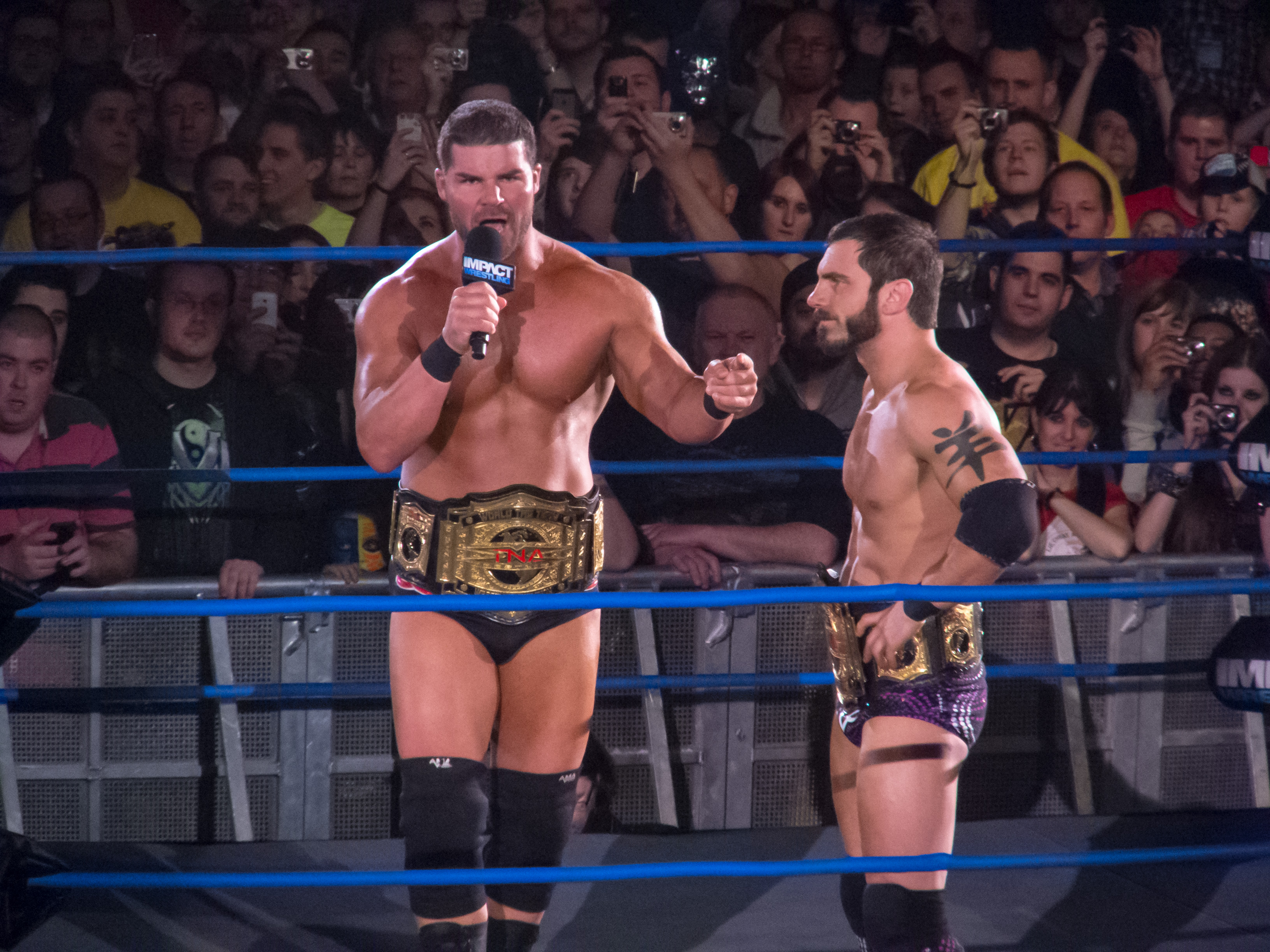
Bobby Roode and Austin Aries, who defended their TNA World Tag Team Championship.

A tag team rivalry entering Lockdown involved defending champions Bobby Roode and Austin Aries, Hernandez and Chavo Guerrero Jr., and Bad Influence (Christopher Daniels and Kazarian), competing for the TNA World Tag Team Championship. On the January 31 edition of Impact Wrestling, on-and-off rivals Roode and Aries confirmed their alliance as a team and their goal to pursue all the TNA championships, declaring that they would start with the World Tag Team Titles. From there, Roode and Aries began a feud with then-TNA World Tag Team Champions Guerrero and Hernandez, earning themselves a title shot a week later after Roode (who had already beaten Hernandez a week ago) and Aries agreed to a match that would grant them title shots if Aries could beat Guerrero, which he then did. On the February 7 edition of Impact Wrestling, Roode and Aries defeated Guerrero and Hernandez to win the tag titles. After Bad Influence came into contact with Roode and Aries over the next few weeks, on the February 28 edition of Impact Wrestling, Aries mentioned to Roode over the phone that there would be a Three-Way match, where he and Roode would defend their titles against Guerrero and Hernandez and Bad Influence at Lockdown.

In the X Division, Kenny King chased after the X Division Championship which eluded him until the February 28 edition of Impact Wrestling, where he finally defeated the champion Rob Van Dam in a title match. King was later scheduled to defend his newly won championship in a Three-Way match with Zema Ion and Christian York at Lockdown.

A feud in the Knockouts Division resulted in Gail Kim going up against defending champion Velvet Sky for the Knockouts Championship. Ever since January's Genesis, when Gail Kim attempted to win with underhanded tactics, Kim felt that Knockouts referee Taryn Terrell had cost her a series of matches, including the Gauntlet match for contention to the Knockouts title, which was won by Sky. In that match, Kim was the last Knockout eliminated when Terrell did not detect Kim's foot under the ropes to call for the rope break. On the February 21 edition of Impact Wrestling, in a Four-Way Elimination Knockouts match that also included defending Knockout Champion Tara and Miss Tessmacher, and also involved Kim and Terrell arguing over Kim's actions in the match. Sky again last eliminated Kim and won the Knockouts Championship.

In another feud which began in December, Robbie E hosted a "Bro Off" segment, where he contended with his ally Robbie T and Jessie Godderz in a dance-off, which, to much surprise, was won by Robbie T after he upstaged everyone else. Several weeks later during TNA's tour of the United Kingdom, Robbie E labeled the people of the UK as "hamsters" in the presence of the UK-born Robbie T. Robbie E then back-tracked and said he did not include Robbie T in his criticism. After Robbie E criticized new UK hire Rockstar Spud and was bossy to the bigger Robbie T, a situation occurred where Robbie T bent down to retrieve his "dropped clipboard", allowing Spud to attack Robbie E on the spot. Robbie T also celebrated with Spud after the altercation. This set up a match that saw Spud upset Robbie E for a win in his first match in TNA. In the aftermath, Robbie E then crossed the line with Robbie T by slapping him across the face which only infuriated Robbie T. Robbie E would soon apologize and propose having another "Bro Off", where during Robbie T's routine, Robbie E took the chance to smash Robbie T with a large portrait, effectively ending their friendship.

Another match added on the card was Joey Ryan versus Joseph Park.

== Reception ==
Lockdown garnered a company record-breaking crowd with over 7,200 fans in attendance, pulling in TNA's largest domestic audience than the record set at Slammiversary 2012. The event itself was met with mixed to positive reviews. Matt Bishop of the SLAM! Sports pro wrestling section on Canadian Online Explorer rated the entire event a 7 out of 10, which was higher than the previous year's 4 out of 10 rating. The lowest rated match on the card was given to the Velvet Sky-Gail Kim Knockouts Title match and the Robbie E-Robbie T encounter, both of which were rated 4 out of 10, while the highest rated matches were the World Tag Team Title match receiving a 9 out of 10, the Kurt Angle-Wes Brisco match warranting a 6 out of 10, the Lethal Lockdown match getting a 7 out of 10, and the Bully Ray-Jeff Hardy World Title main event match receiving a 7 out of 10.

Feedback from the Wrestling Observer Newsletter gave the event a score of somewhere between a thumbs in the middle to a thumbs up. Praise was given to the Lethal Lockdown match which was thought of as the best match of the night. The Robbie E-Robbie T match which was chosen as the worst match. The overall show reaction was that the first half of the event was "poor" and the second half was "very good" and, of that the angle around the main event, that they "thought the ending of the main event was the right way to book and the fans reaction brought me back to the days of WCW I miss so much."

== Aftermath ==
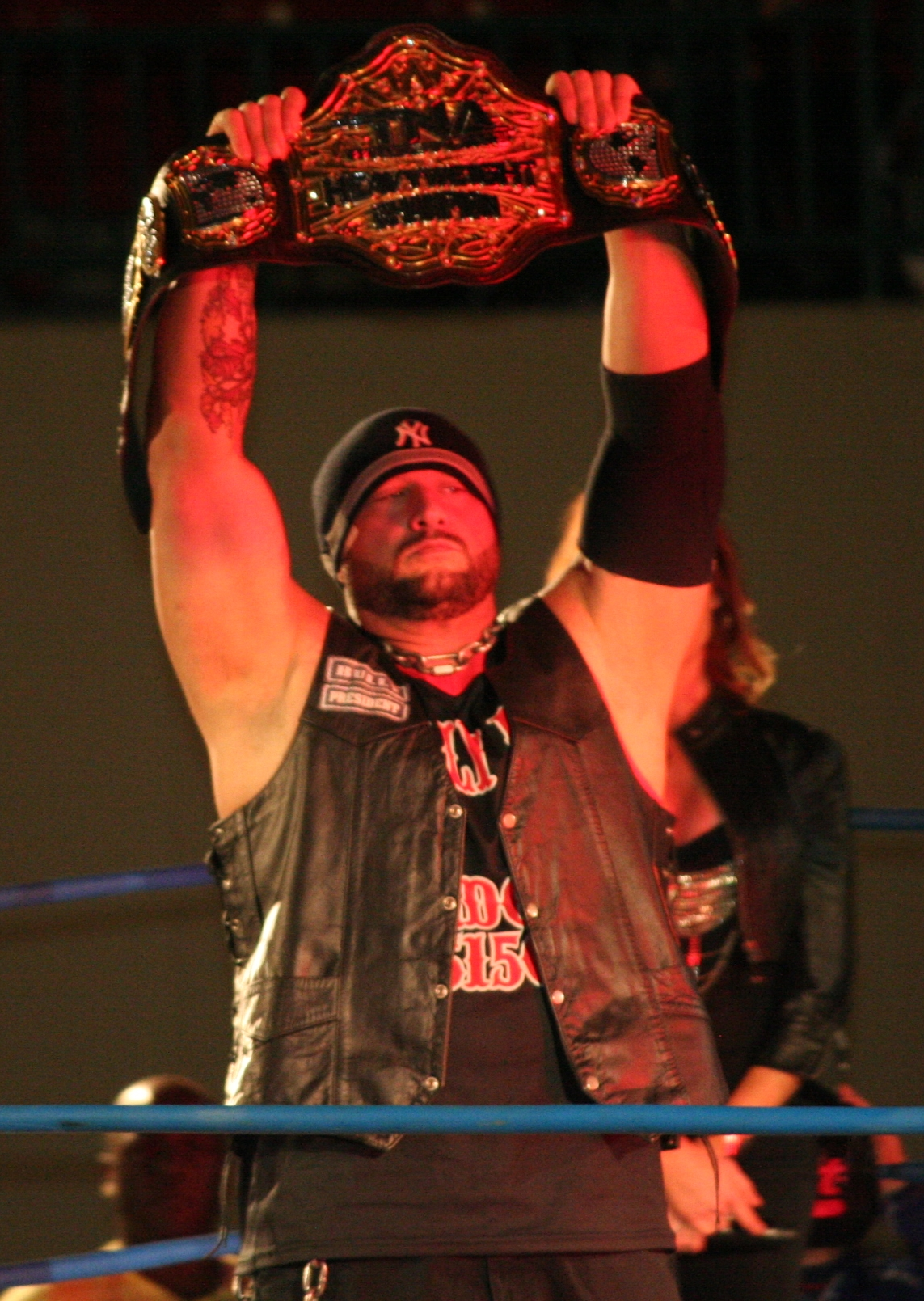
Bully Ray as TNA World Heavyweight Champion.

After turning villainous and revealing himself as the President of the Aces & Eights following his inaugural TNA World Heavyweight Championship victory over defending champion Jeff Hardy, Bully Ray touted his acts of deception which he revealed to be a trick the whole time and a way to earn the trust of Sting, Brooke Hogan and Hulk Hogan in order to get in line for a chance to capture the world title. A series of videos were later aired featuring Bully Ray explaining the nine month con. Aces & Eights also heightened their domination, prompting TNA General Manager Hulk Hogan, to rally TNA roster members to fight for the company.

TNA World Tag Team Champions Bobby Roode and Austin Aries continued their feud with Chavo Guerrero and Hernandez for the titles. Guerrero and Hernandez unrelentingly pursued the belts, winning them back in a two out of three falls match on the April 11 edition of Impact Wrestling. When Gunner and James Storm won the titles in a three-way elimination tag team match at Slammiversary, the feud effectively ended.

Following Lockdown, The now-named Rob Terry won a second singles match against Robbie E. On the May 2 edition of Impact Wrestling, Robbie E later sought help from Jessie Godderz and Joey Ryan, and all three went on to lose a Handicap match to Terry.

Due to violating her probation as Knockouts referee, TNA Knockouts Executive Brooke Hogan, fired Terrell as a referee and reinstated her as an active wrestler, allowing her to feud with Kim. The feud proceeded to brew and at Slammiversary, Terrell defeated Kim in a highly acclaimed Last Knockout Standing match.

Velvet Sky's next challenger for the Knockouts Championship was Mickie James, who became #1 Contender by defeating Brooke Tessmacher on April 18. Sky defeated James on the following week's edition of Impact Wrestling to retain the title; despite James targeting Velvet's injured knee. Sky lost the Knockouts title to James on the May 23 edition of Impact Wrestling after James delivered a chopblock to Velvet's bad knee followed by a DDT. On the June 13 edition of Impact Wrestling, James turned villainous by attacking Velvet after she requested a rematch. On the June 27 edition of Impact Wrestling, the evil James defeated Sky in a title rematch to end their feud.

New rules were implemented for the X Division, where every match from that point on, would be a three-way match and all participants in the X Division matches were then required to be 230 pounds or under. In addition, the losing opponent in the three-way matches meant that they would be pushed to the back of the line of the X Division ranking.

== Results ==
No.	Results	Stipulations	Times
1	Kenny King (c) defeated Christian York and Zema Ion	Three-Way match for the TNA X Division Championship	11:01
2	Joseph Park defeated Joey Ryan	Singles match	05:42
3	Velvet Sky (c) defeated Gail Kim	Singles match for the TNA Knockouts Championship	07:26
4	Robbie T defeated Robbie E	Singles match	05:42
5	Austin Aries and Bobby Roode (c) defeated Bad Influence (Christopher Daniels and Kazarian) and Chavo Guerrero and Hernandez	Three-Way Tag Team match for the TNA World Tag Team Championship	17:01
6	Wes Brisco defeated Kurt Angle	Steel Cage match	11:44
7	Team TNA (Eric Young, James Storm, Magnus, Samoa Joe and Sting) defeated Aces & Eights (Devon, D.O.C., Garett Bischoff, Knux and Mr. Anderson)	Lethal Lockdown match	25:25
8	Bully Ray defeated Jeff Hardy (c)	Steel Cage match for the TNA World Heavyweight Championship	17:11
(c) / – the champion(s) heading into the match

== See also ==
- 2013 in professional wrestling
