= Aces & Eights =

Professional wrestling stable

- Motto: "When You Ride With the Aces and Eights, You Never Walk Alone"

Statistics
- Members: See below
- Billed from: Streets of "New York City"
- Debut: June 14, 2012
- Years active: 2012–2013; 2020; 2022

Aces & Eights were a villainous stable in the American promotion Total Nonstop Action Wrestling (TNA, later Impact Wrestling), initially consisting of a group of masked wrestlers before their identities were revealed. It had the gimmick of a Vigilante Posse motorcycle club; members of the stable rode motorcycles, wore kuttes, and were referred to as either "prospects" or "patched in". The name of the stable is a reference to the two pair poker hand known as the "dead man's hand".

== History ==
=== Takeover of TNA ===
The stable debuted on the June 14, 2012, episode of Impact Wrestling, with three masked wrestlers attacking Sting as he discussed his induction to the TNA Hall of Fame. On the July 5 episode of Impact Wrestling, an unnamed man delivered an envelope to TNA General Manager Hulk Hogan containing a photograph of aces and eights playing cards (known as the "dead man's hand") and a note reading "see you next week", saying "we're not cowards... we've got something for you Hogan, wait and see!"

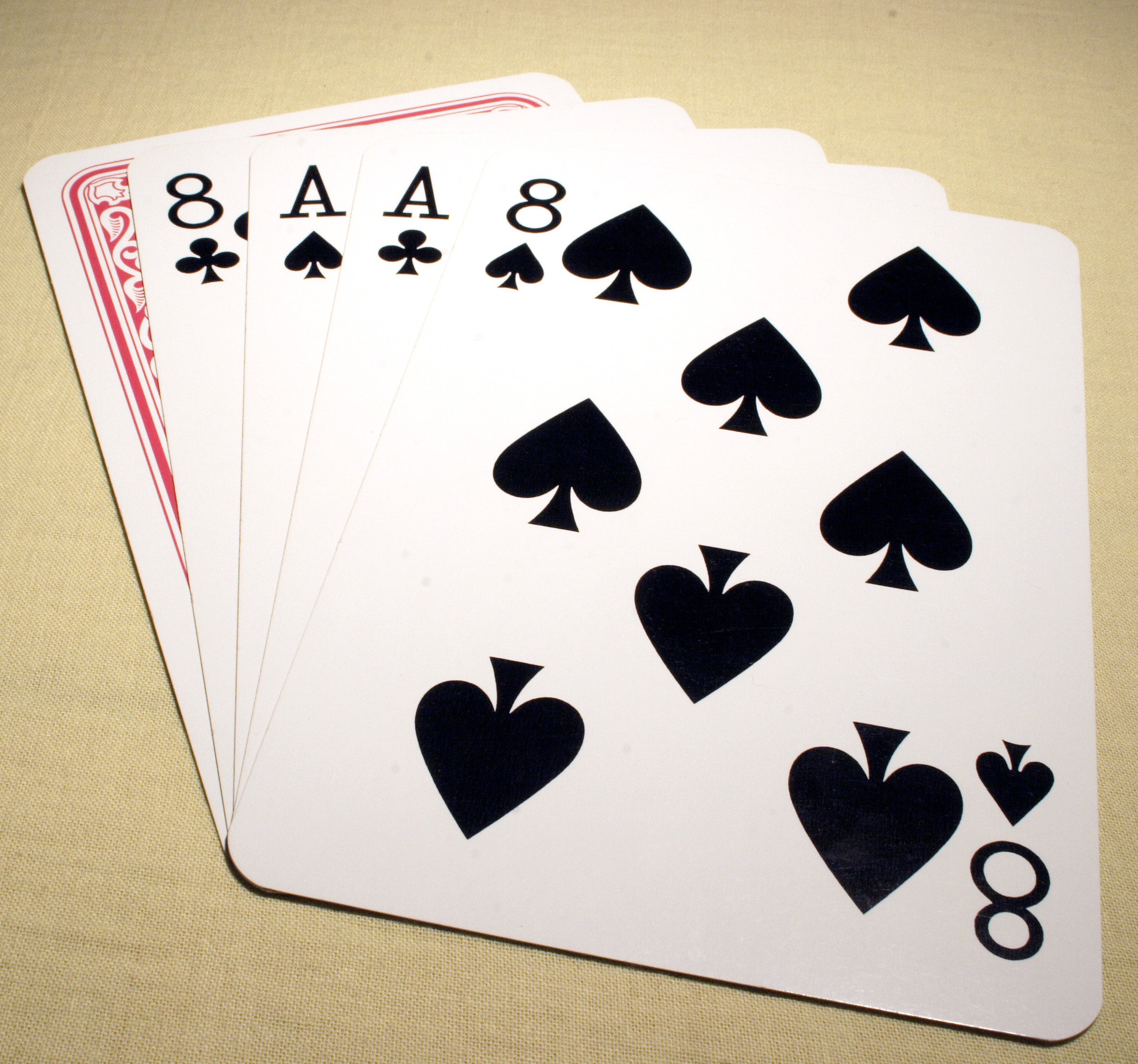
The Dead man's hand comprising two Aces and two eights, was held by Wild Bill Hickok when he was murdered

Aces & Eights returned (in greater numbers) to TNA on the July 12, 2012, episode of Impact Wrestling, attacking both Sting and Hogan, with Hogan billed as having sustained a pelvic fracture (providing a kayfabe explanation for his absence from television while recovering from surgery to alleviate back pain). Over the next several weeks, the stable continued to attack both faces and heels, they were initially introduced as a Vigilante Gang

Aces & Eights made its first appearance on pay-per-view at Hardcore Justice on August 12, 2012, attacking D'Angelo Dinero backstage (providing a kayfabe explanation for his absence from television to recuperate from a shoulder injury). Aces & Eights later interfered in a four-way tables match, attacking Jeff Hardy and the eventual winner, Bully Ray.

On the August 23, 2012, episode of Impact Wrestling, Aces & Eights brawled with members of the TNA roster, injuring the right arm of TNA World Heavyweight Champion Austin Aries. One week later, Aces & Eights attacked Aries again, knocking him unconscious with a foreign object. The following week on Impact Wrestling, a low-level member of Aces & Eights named Mike was interrogated by Austin Aries into leaking information about Aces & Eights, but Aces & Eights came out and knocked out Mike with a hammer to prevent him from revealing anything.

At No Surrender, on September 9, 2012, Aces & Eights again brawled with the TNA roster following a fight between Aries and a member called "The Armbreaker", injuring the shoulder of Jeff Hardy prior to his Bound for Glory series final against Bully Ray.

Aces & Eights wrestled its first match at the Bound for Glory pay-per-view on October 14, 2012, where two unnamed members of the stable defeated Sting and Bully Ray in a no disqualification tag team match to win unfettered access to the Impact Zone (Aces & Eights had agreed to leave TNA if they had lost). They won following interference from two other members of the stable, one of whom was subsequently unmasked and revealed as Devon, a member of the TNA roster and the former tag team partner of Bully Ray. Devon was the first member of Aces & Eights to be formally identified by TNA.

On the October 18, 2012, episode of Impact Wrestling, Devon, speaking for the gang (his vest identified him as "Sergeant-at-Arms"), threatened the TNA roster, who responded by attacking Aces & Eights. Sting challenged Devon to a match, which Sting won by disqualification when Aces & Eights interfered.

On the October 25 Impact Wrestling, Aces & Eights announced they would target a victim, chosen by throwing a dart at a photo collage of TNA wrestlers and later revealed to be Kurt Angle (a previous target of Aces & Eights). Angle had just lost a TNA World Heavyweight Championship match to Jeff Hardy. Bully Ray confronted his "brother" Devon, who claimed Hogan's mistreatment of him was why he joined Aces & Eights. After Devon announced that he and Bully were no longer brothers, Bully called Devon a "coward" and challenged him to a match on the "Open Fight Night" episode of Impact, on November 1.

That match ended in a brawl between the TNA roster and Aces & Eights, during which Joseph Park unmasked a member, revealing him as Drew Hankinson.

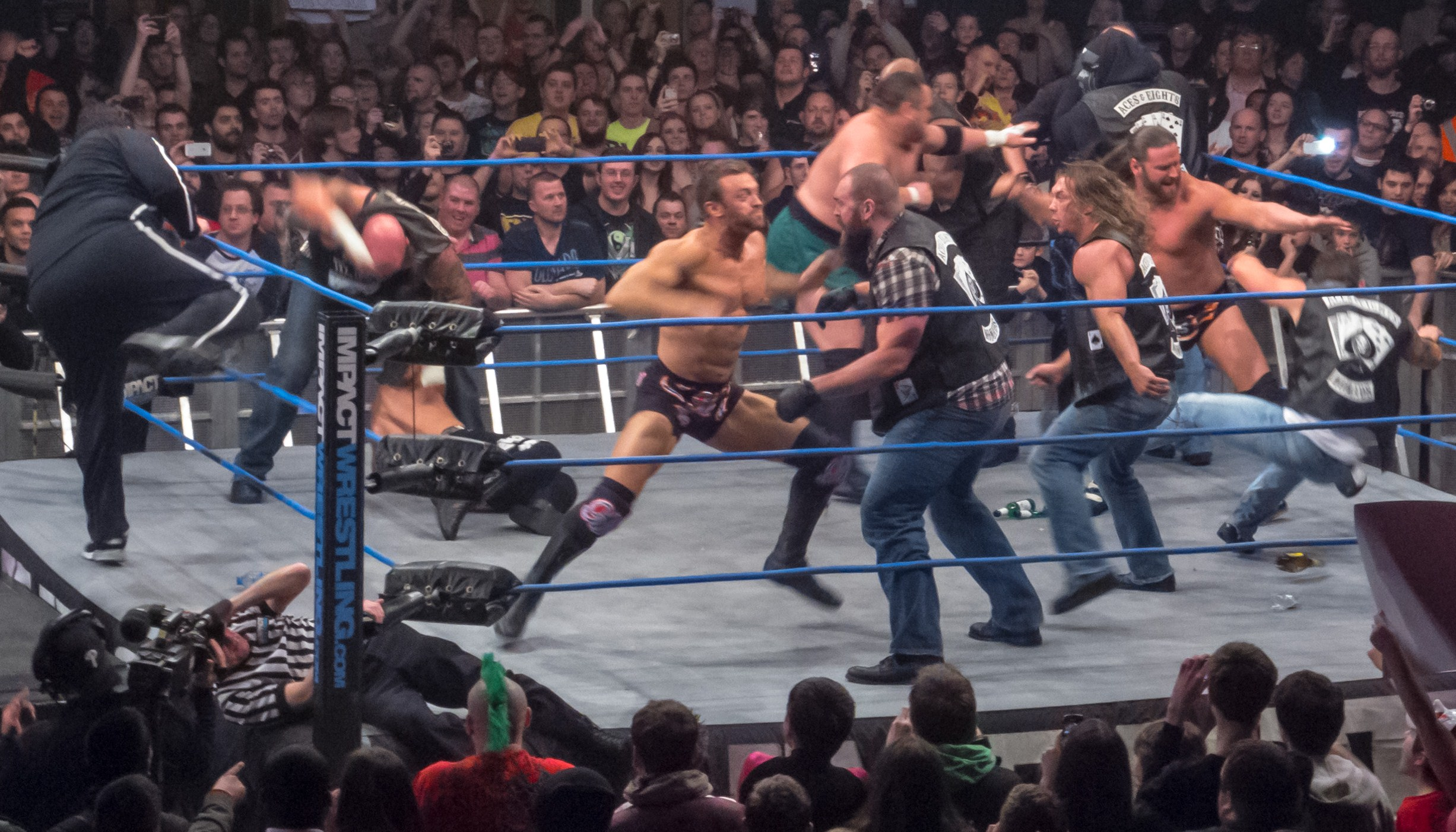
Aces & Eights brawl with the TNA roster

On the November 8 Impact Wrestling, Hankinson was introduced as D.O.C. (Director of Chaos), a prospect of Aces & Eights. Later that night, D.O.C. teamed with Devon to wrestle Sting and Angle. Sting and Angle won by disqualification when Devon used Sting's baseball bat. D.O.C. then drove Sting through a table, to prove his worth to the group. Sting was then attacked by several members and beaten with a ball-peen hammer by D.O.C.

D.O.C. defeated Joseph Park, and Devon lost to Kurt Angle at the Turning Point pay-per-view on November 11.

=== Dominance ===
On the November 15 episode of Impact Wrestling, Aces & Eights chose Magnus as their next victim; Devon used a baseball bat and D.O.C. a ball-peen hammer to injure Magnus' knees. Later that night, Kurt Angle teamed with Garett Bischoff to defeat Devon and an unnamed member, despite D.O.C. attempting to interfere in the match. As a reward for his loyalty, D.O.C. was promoted from a prospect to a patched in member.

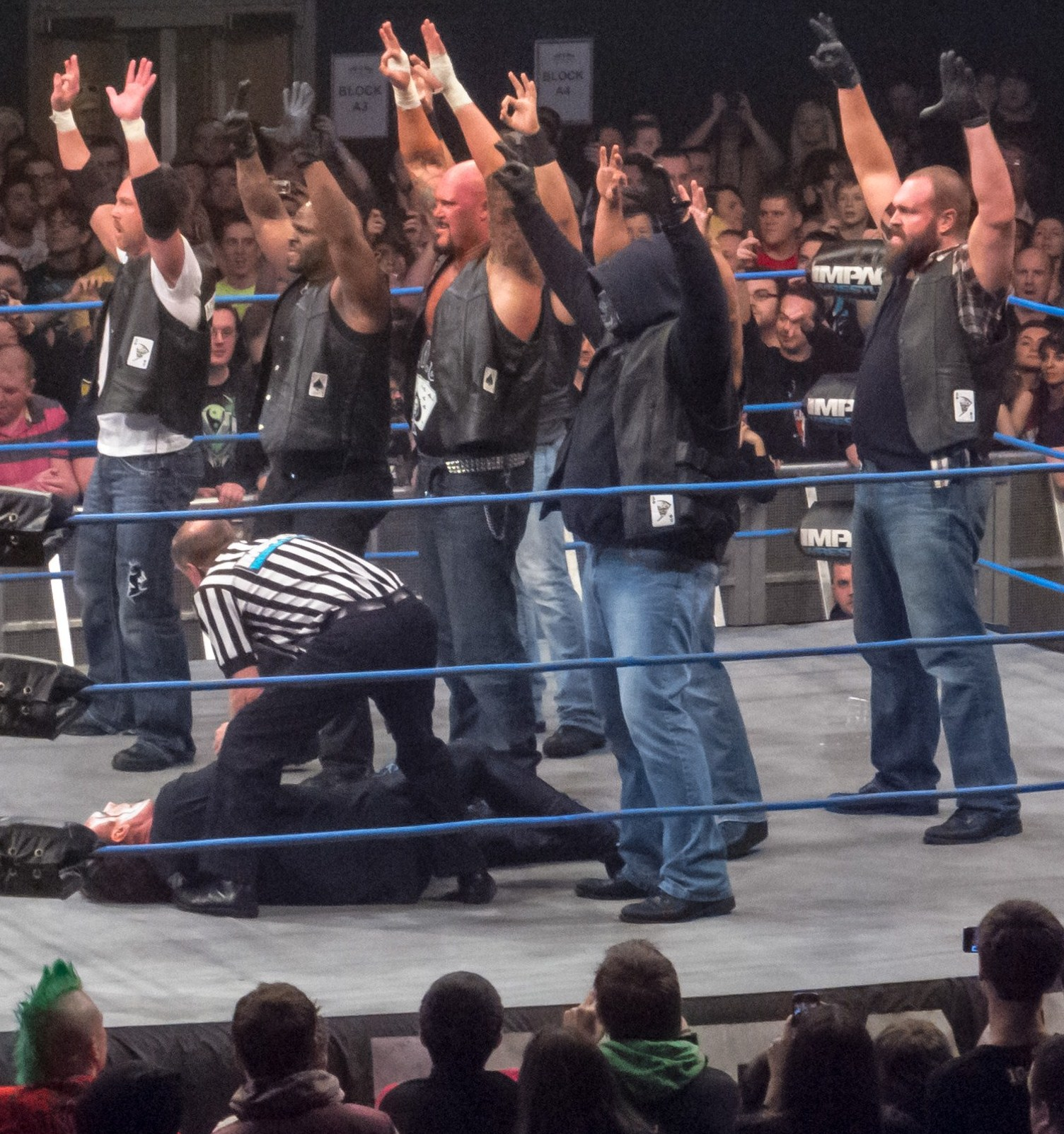
Aces & Eights in January 2013. Visible are (from left to right) Mr. Anderson, Devon, D.O.C., D'Lo Brown (as the masked "VP"), and Knux (back), standing over Sting (bottom)

On the November 22 episode of Impact Wrestling, Aces & Eights attacks Eric Young as their next victim after Young won the 2012 Impact Turkey Bowl against Jessie Godderz and Robbie E in a triple threat turkey suit match; Devon used a baseball bat on the back of Eric's left leg. ODB was hand-cuffed to the ringpost and forced to watch DOC injuring Eric's right ankle with a ball peen hammer.

On the December 6 episode of Impact Wrestling, Devon became the first member of Aces & Eights to win a title, defeating Samoa Joe for the Television Championship, after interference from D.O.C. Later that night, the group attacked Angle again, as well as Jeff Hardy after being paid to do so by Bobby Roode. At Final Resolution, Devon, D.O.C., and two masked members lost to Kurt Angle, Samoa Joe, Garett Bischoff, and Wes Brisco, after Angle pinned one of the masked members.

On the December 27 episode of Impact Wrestling, Aces & Eights offered membership to Mr. Anderson. Anderson accepted that offer on the January 3, 2013, episode of Impact Wrestling. Later that night, Devon and a masked Aces & Eights member were defeated by Kurt Angle and Samoa Joe in a tag team cage match. Afterwards, several Aces & Eights members attacked Angle and Joe. Sting made his return and helped them fight off Aces & Eights with his baseball bat. Angle unmasked Devon's tag team partner, revealing him as Knox (renamed "Knux" in March 2013).

On January 13, 2013, at Genesis, Aces & Eights went two for three: Mr. Anderson defeated Samoa Joe and Devon defeated Joseph Park, before D.O.C. lost to Sting.

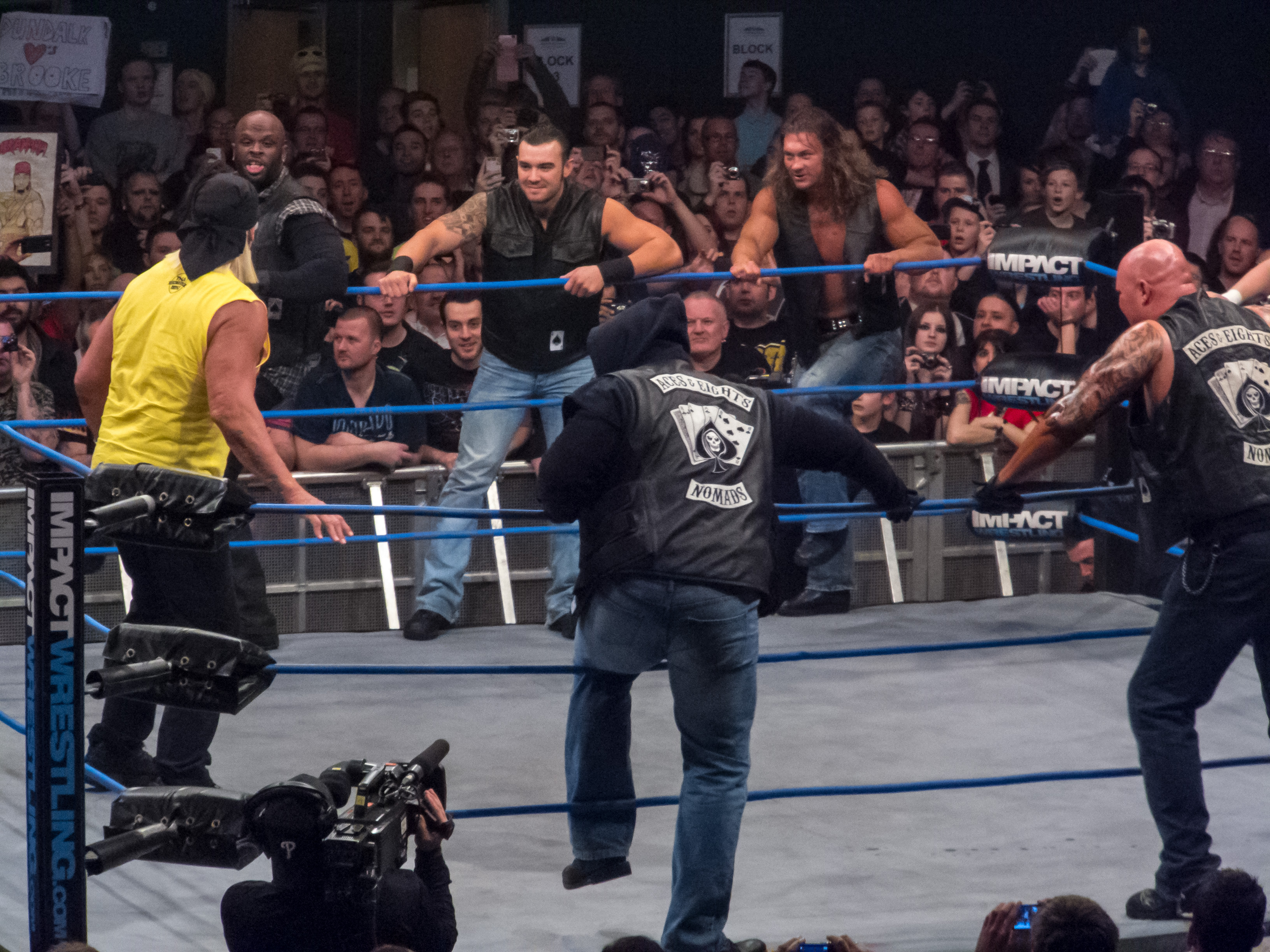
Aces & Eights (Devon, Garett Bischoff, and Wes Brisco on the far side of the ring, with "VP" - later revealed to be D'Lo Brown - and D.O.C. on the near side) surround General Manager Hulk Hogan on the February 14, 2013, episode of Impact

On the January 17 Impact Wrestling, Aces & Eights crashed Bully Ray and Brooke Hogan's wedding and attacked Ray, Hulk Hogan, and two of Ray's groomsmen, Tommy Dreamer and Brother Runt, after Ray's best man, Taz, revealed himself as the newest member. During the beatdown, Knux and D.O.C. taunted Brooke and forced her to watch. Sting tried to make the save, but was also beaten down. Aces & Eights then ran off, leaving Brooke to tend to her father and fiancé.

On the January 24 Championship Thursday edition of Impact Wrestling, Taz explained why he joined Aces & Eights and implied that his contract with TNA makes him effectively immune to retaliation by TNA Management; Taz also mentioned working for a "higher power" within Aces & Eights. Later that night, Bully Ray swore revenge upon Aces & Eights, singling out Devon and Taz as his main targets. Kurt Angle called out Mr. Anderson and challenged him to a steel cage match at Open Fight Night on the January 31 Impact Wrestling. Just after Jeff Hardy defeated Christopher Daniels in the main event, Taz distracted Hardy as a masked member of Aces & Eights attacked Hardy from behind, injuring Hardy's left leg.

That same night, it was revealed that Angle's friends, Wes Brisco and Garett Bischoff, were also members of Aces & Eights. Angle defeated Anderson in their cage match while Brisco watched from ringside; after the match, a masked member of Aces & Eights confronted Angle, then revealed himself as Bischoff. Brisco feigned surprise, then suddenly attacked Angle along with Bischoff; Brisco then took his suit jacket off and let his hair down as he revealed his own Aces & Eights vest. Magnus made his return and fought Devon, but D.O.C. and Knux interfered; Magnus threw his attackers over the top rope and forced them to retreat. Hulk Hogan reinstated Bully Ray and made a match for the February 7 Impact Wrestling: Bully and Sting vs. Devon and D.O.C. in a tables tag match.

On the February 7 Impact Wrestling, Bischoff stated that he joined Aces & Eights because he got no respect from the fans, and Brisco said he joined because Hulk Hogan disrespected him. Devon then threatened Angle, saying that Aces & Eights would end his career. In the main event, Bully Ray and Sting defeated Devon and D.O.C. in their tables tag match; Sting gave D.O.C. a Scorpion Deathdrop and Bully drove his former brother Devon through a table for the win.

On the February 14 Impact Wrestling, Sting accepted Aces & Eights' challenge at Lockdown: Sting and three members of the TNA Roster would face Devon, D.O.C., Knux and Mr. Anderson in a 4-on-4 tag team match. Later that night, Angle faced Samoa Joe in a World Heavyweight Championship contender's match, but Brisco and Bischoff interfered and attacked both Angle and Joe, resulting in a "No Contest" for the match. At the end of the night, Hogan was about to announce the #1 contender for the TNA World Heavyweight Championship, but Aces & Eights rushed the ring and surrounded Hogan; Sting and Bully Ray came out for the save, forcing Aces & Eights to retreat.

On the February 21 Impact Wrestling, Bischoff faced Samoa Joe, but Brisco intervened, resulting in Bischoff's disqualification. Angle rushed to the ring for the save; as Bischoff and Brisco retreated through the crowd, Angle challenged Brisco to a steel cage match at Lockdown. In the main event, Devon, D.O.C. and Anderson faced Sting, Bully Ray and Hogan in a six-man tag match, but Hogan was a no-show. As Sting & Bully prepared to finish off Anderson, Aces & Eights dragged Brooke Hogan and her father to the ring, forcing Bully Ray to rush to their aid; D.O.C. took advantage of the distraction to execute a big boot to the face followed by the pin on Sting, who was then beaten down by Aces & Eights.

On the February 28 Impact Wrestling, Sting expanded the Lethal Lockdown match at Lockdown to 5-on-5: Devon, D.O.C., Anderson, Knux and Bischoff would face "Team TNA", consisting of Sting, Samoa Joe, Magnus, James Storm and Eric Young; as Sting distracted Aces & Eights, Young snuck into the ring and attacked Aces & Eights from behind, then Team TNA fought Aces & Eights and forced them to retreat. At the end of the night, Kurt Angle chanced upon Mr. Anderson and beat him down, then Angle invaded the Aces & Eights clubhouse, attacking Devon and the masked Vice-President. Angle smashed a bottle over the VP's head before unmasking him; a shocked Angle then angrily berated the VP, whose face was never shown on camera. The show ended as the other members of Aces & Eights attacked Angle from behind.

The March 7 episode of Impact Wrestling had Brisco coming out to the ring to insult Angle, who responded by attacking Brisco. As TNA officials attempted to separate Brisco and Angle, Angle pointed at one of the officials, D'Lo Brown, who then kicked Angle in the groin and revealed himself as the Vice-President of Aces & Eights. Devon then faced Sting in the first match in a Best-of-Three series to determine which team would get the advantage at Lockdown; Devon pinned Sting after a fan blinded Sting by throwing beer in his face. In the second match of the series, Samoa Joe and Magnus defeated D.O.C. and Bischoff, and in the last match of the series, Mr. Anderson pinned James Storm after Aces & Eights distracted Storm, thus giving Aces & Eights the advantage at Lockdown. The show ended with Brown leading Aces & Eights into the ring for a brawl with Team TNA.

At the Lockdown pay-per-view, Brisco won his match against Angle with help from Brown. Later in the night, Aces & Eights lost the Lethal Lockdown match after Eric Young landed an elbow drop from the top of the steel cage for the pin. Later in the night, Aces & Eights interfered in the Steel Cage match between Bully Ray and Jeff Hardy. Devon tossed a hammer to Bully Ray, who used it on Jeff Hardy to win the TNA World Heavyweight Championship, turning heel in the process. Bully Ray announced after the match that he used Hulk and Brooke to become champion and revealed himself to be the President of Aces & Eights. On the April 11 episode of Impact Wrestling, Ray successfully defended the TNA World Heavyweight Championship in a Full Metal Mayhem against Hardy. On the May 2 episode of Impact Wrestling, Brown was defeated by Kurt Angle in an "I Quit" match after swearing on his colors that he would beat Angle, resulting in Bully Ray demoting him to prospect (on July 17, Brown was released from TNA, thus permanently removing him from Aces & Eights). On the May 16 episode of Impact Wrestling, Mr. Anderson told Kurt Angle that the following week, AJ Styles would be patched in to Aces & Eights. On the May 23 episode of Impact Wrestling, Styles did accept the leather vest and attacked Kurt with a hammer, however he also attacked the other members of Aces & Eights.

At the Slammiversary pay-per-view, Devon defeated Joseph Park by count out (due to a pre-match attack by Devon and Knux) to retain the TNA Television Championship, only to lose it to Abyss, Park's brother. Bischoff, Anderson, and Brisco would also fall in defeat to Samoa Joe, Magnus, and Jeff Hardy in a six-man tag. Bully Ray managed to defeat Sting in a No Holds Barred match, after knocking him down with a hammer which meant Sting could never challenge for the TNA World Heavyweight Championship again.

=== Downfall ===
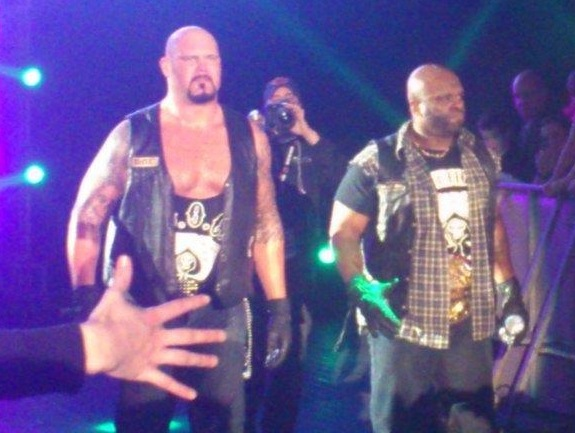
Devon as Television Champion with Aces & Eights member D.O.C.

After Slammiversary, Sting announced the return of the Main Event Mafia to war with Aces and Eights. On the June 13 edition of Impact Wrestling, Mr. Anderson won a battle royal which also included fellow members Devon, D.O.C., Knux, Wes Brisco, and Garett Bischoff for a spot in the 2013 Bound for Glory Series after D.O.C. was forcibly thrown out by Anderson after refusing to voluntarily eliminate himself as the other members had done.

On the July 11 edition of Impact Wrestling, D.O.C. lost his bid to become the Vice-President of Aces and Eights as Knux gave his deciding vote to Mr. Anderson, to D.O.C.'s disgust. On July 12, 2013, D.O.C. parted ways with TNA after his contract expired (it was explained on-screen that he turned in his kutte over losing the VP bid to Anderson). On July 18 at Impact Wrestling: Destination X, Bully Ray lost the World Heavyweight Championship to Chris Sabin following interference from both Aces & Eights and the Main Event Mafia. On the August 1 episode of Impact Wrestling, Kurt Angle announced that the Main Event Mafia and Aces & Eights would face off in a 5-on-5 tag match at Impact Wrestling: Hardcore Justice on August 15, whereby the person to be pinned or submit must leave TNA.

The 5-on-5 match would be delayed until the August 22 episode of Impact Wrestling due to Kurt Angle entering rehab following a DUI. At Impact Wrestling: Hardcore Justice, Bully Ray regained the TNA World Heavyweight Championship, defeating Sabin in a steel cage match after Tito Ortiz (who officially joined Aces & Eights) and Mr. Anderson interfered. Later in the evening (for the episode to be aired on August 22) The Main Event Mafia (who recruited AJ Styles to be Angle's replacement) defeated Aces & Eights after Styles pinned Devon following a Styles Clash. This forced Devon to leave TNA, thus also removing him from Aces & Eights. On the same show, Bully Ray also revealed that he had been involved romantically with Brooke Tessmacher, now named just Brooke. Brooke then also officially joined Aces & Eights.

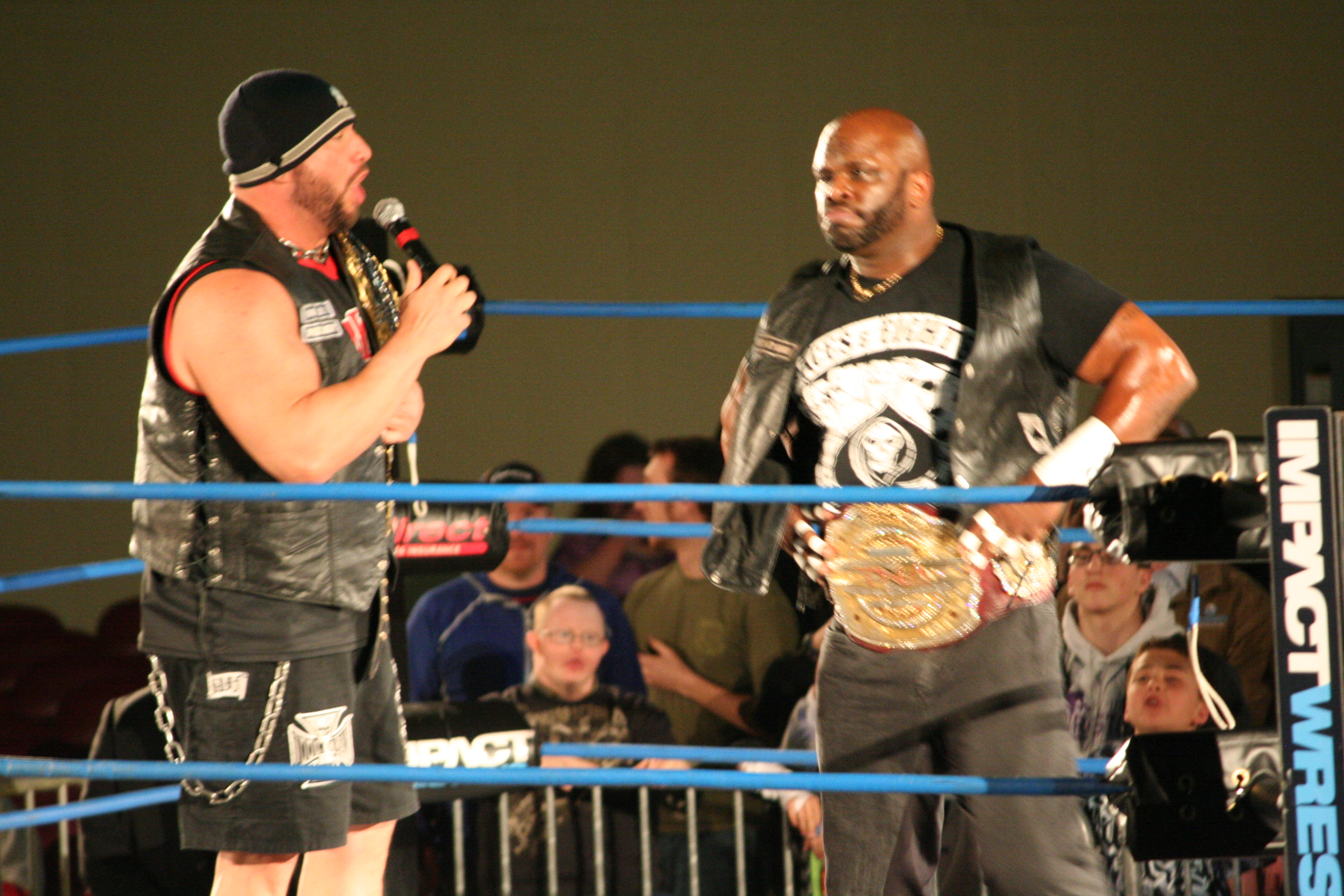
Bully Ray (President) and Devon (Sgt. at Arms) as World Heavyweight and Television Champions

Following weeks of dissension, and after Hulk Hogan enforced the rule that Bully Ray must challenge one of the members of the group for the next title defense on the September 12 special episode of Impact Wrestling: No Surrender, on the September 5 episode of Impact Wrestling, Mr. Anderson intentionally missed handing the hammer to Bully Ray to get out of Scorpion Deathlock by Sting, thus losing the no-disqualification match. Anderson confronted Bully Ray and revealed he would be the challenger. On Impact Wrestling: No Surrender, it was announced that Bellator MMA had pulled Ortiz from TNA programming due to his upcoming PPV fight with Rampage Jackson. On the same show, Bully emerged victorious over Anderson in a Last Man Standing match with the help of the other group members, and took the kutte from Anderson after a post-match beating, effectively removing him as Vice President and a member of the group. It caused a rift within the stable as the remaining members tried to voice their opinions on Bully Ray's clouded judgments after he started his relationship with Tessmacher and ousted Mr. Anderson. On the September 26 episode of Impact Wrestling, Knux called out Bully Ray again for hanging around with Tessmacher rather than taking care of the remaining members, and barred him from participation from the next tag match against The Main Event Mafia. Later in the night, following an Aces & Eights defeat to the Main Event Mafia in which Samoa Joe forced Wes Brisco to submit, Bully Ray came to the ring and told Brisco that he was out of Aces and Eights, but Brisco refused to hand his kutte over to Ray. Ray then hit Brisco with a clothesline and piledriver, after which Knux and Bischoff, after some hesitation, eventually took Brisco's kutte off and gave it to Ray. At Bound for Glory, despite interference from Dixie Carter and Aces & Eights, Bully Ray lost the TNA World Heavyweight Championship to AJ Styles. On the October 24 episode of Impact Wrestling, Mr. Anderson returned and cost Bully Ray his rematch with Styles for the TNA World Heavyweight Championship.

On the November 14 edition of Impact Wrestling, Mr. Anderson challenged Bully Ray to a No Disqualification match with the stipulation that if Ray lost, Aces & Eights would disband but if Anderson lost, he would leave TNA. It was announced that the match would take place the following week at Impact Wrestling: Turning Point. The same day Anderson came out and gave Garett Bischoff a piledriver on the stage. At Impact Wrestling: Turning Point, Anderson defeated Ray in a No Disqualification match. Due to the stipulations of the match, the stable disbanded. The following week, a funeral segment for the group was shown.

=== Reunion ===
D'Lo Brown and Mr. Anderson were scheduled to represent Aces and Eights at TNA: There's No Place Like Home but the event was canceled due to the COVID-19 pandemic. However, on the June 23, 2020 episode of Impact!, D'Lo Brown teased the return of the faction by standing up from a chair to reveal an Aces & Eights kutte draped over the back.

On the June 16, 2022 episode of Impact!, Aces & Eights (represented by Garett Bischoff and Wes Brisco and managed by D'Lo Brown) made their return as fan favorites, losing to Honor No More's Kenny King and Vincent.

== Members ==
Member	Position	Date in	Date out
Bully Ray (leader)	President	March 10, 2013	November 21, 2013
Brooke	First Lady	August 22, 2013	November 21, 2013
D'Lo Brown	1st Vice-President, later Prospect	March 7, 2013	July 7, 2013
Mr. Anderson	2nd Vice-President	January 3, 2013	September 5, 2013
Devon	1st Sgt. at Arms	October 14, 2012	August 22, 2013
Tito Ortiz	2nd Sgt. at Arms	August 29, 2013	September 12, 2013
Taz	Spokesperson	January 17, 2013	November 21, 2013
D.O.C.	Soldier	November 1, 2012	July 12, 2013
Garett Bischoff	Soldier	January 31, 2013	November 21, 2013
Knux	Soldier	January 3, 2013	November 21, 2013
Wes Brisco	Soldier	October 18, 2012	September 26, 2013
Mike	Prospect	September 6, 2012	September 6, 2012
C.J. O'Doyle	Prospect	August 23, 2012	December 9, 2012
Leva Bates	Prospect	September 27, 2012	September 27, 2012
Ivelisse Vélez	Honorary	March 18, 2013	March 18, 2013

== Championships and accomplishments ==
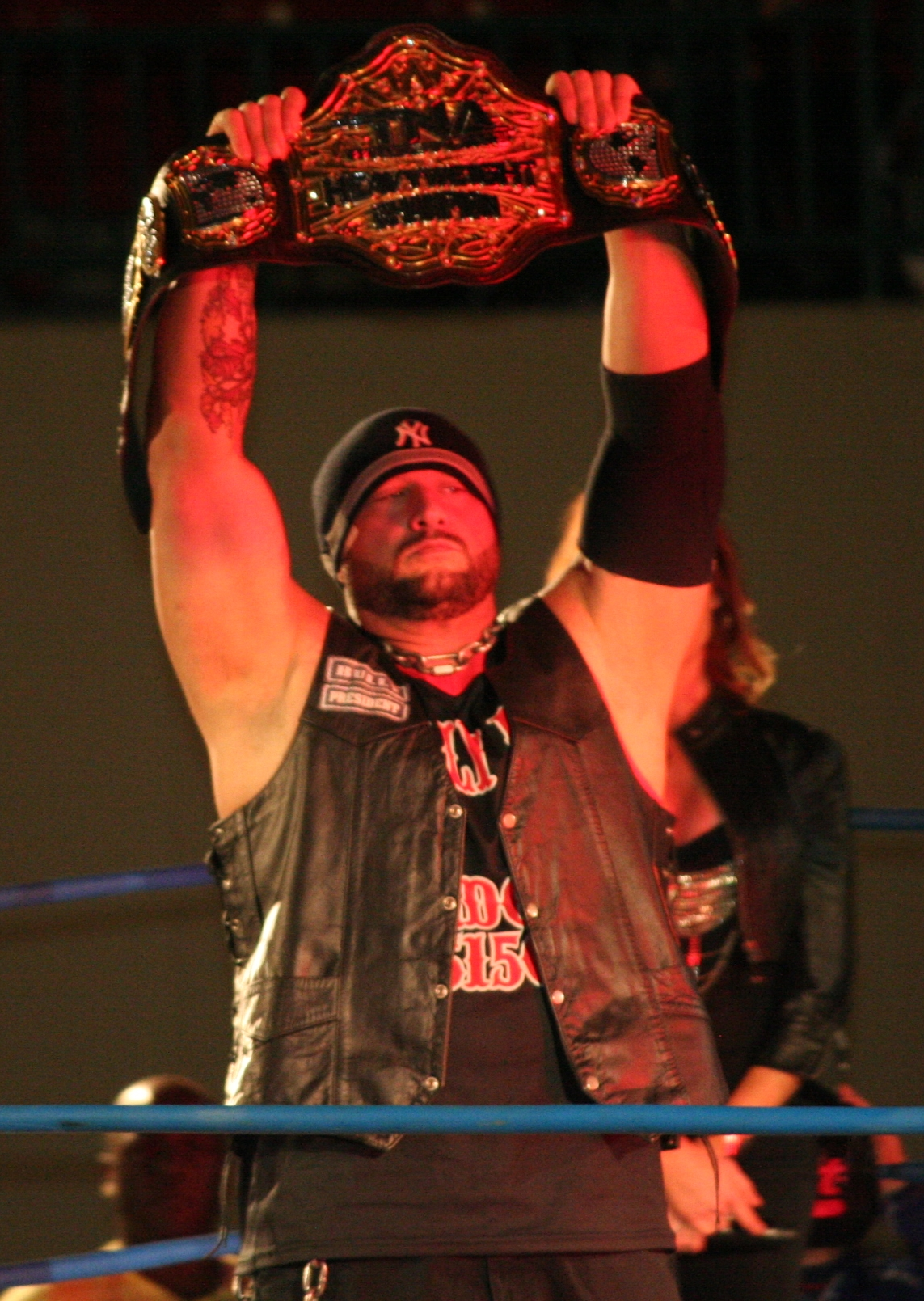
Bully Ray, as President of the Aces & Eights, was a two-time TNA World Heavyweight Champion.

- American Pro Wrestling Alliance
  - APWA Hardcore Cup Championship (1 time) – Knux
  - APWA World Tag Team Championship (1 time) – Knux and D.O.C
- Atomic Revolutionary Wrestling
  - ARW Next Level Championship (1 time) – Garrett Bischoff
- Pro Wrestling Illustrated
  - PWI Feud of the Year (2012) vs. TNA
  - PWI ranked Ray #4 of the top 500 singles wrestlers in the PWI 500 in 2013
  - PWI ranked Devon #32 of the top 500 singles wrestlers in the PWI 500 in 2013
  - PWI ranked Anderson #62 of the top 500 singles wrestlers in the PWI 500 in 2013
  - PWI ranked D.O.C. #69 of the top 500 singles wrestlers in the PWI 500 in 2013
  - PWI ranked Brisco #101 of the top 500 singles wrestlers in the PWI 500 in 2013
  - PWI ranked Knux #132 of the top 500 singles wrestlers in the PWI 500 in 2013
  - PWI ranked Bischoff #235 of the top 500 singles wrestlers in the PWI 500 in 2013
- Rampage Pro Wrestling
  - RPW Heavyweight Championship (1 time) – D.O.C.
- River City Wrestling
  - RCW Tag Team Championship (1 time) – Knux and D.O.C
- Total Nonstop Action Wrestling
  - TNA Television Championship (1 time) – Devon
  - TNA World Heavyweight Championship (2 times) – Bully Ray
  - TNA Gut Check winner – Wes Brisco
- Wrestling Observer Newsletter
  - Worst Gimmick (2012, 2013)
