= TNA Genesis (2013) =

2013 Total Nonstop Action Wrestling pay-per-view event

Genesis (2013)
- Promotional poster featuring Bully Ray
- Promotion: Total Nonstop Action Wrestling
- Date: January 13, 2013
- City: Orlando, Florida
- Venue: Impact Zone
- Attendance: 1,100
- Tagline: Do you know who I am?

Pay-per-view chronology
← Previous; Final Resolution	Next → Lockdown

Genesis chronology
← Previous; 2012	Next → 2014

The 2013 Genesis was a professional wrestling pay-per-view event produced by Total Nonstop Action Wrestling that was held on January 13, 2013 at the Impact Wrestling Zone in Orlando, Florida. It was the eighth annual Genesis event. This was the first pay-per-view event of the 2013 calendar to jump start TNA's new business initiative to reduce their regular annual PPVs a year down to four. It was also TNA's final live pay-per-view event to be held in the original Impact Zone (Soundstage 21) before the company began touring.

Nine matches were featured on the card. In the main event was Jeff Hardy successfully defending the TNA World Heavyweight Championship against Bobby Roode and Austin Aries in a Triple Threat Elimination match. Other top matches included Sting overcoming Aces & Eights member D.O.C. in a singles match, and Christopher Daniels defeating James Storm to receive a shot at the TNA World Title.

In October 2017, with the launch of the Global Wrestling Network, the event became available to stream on demand.

== Storylines ==
Other on-screen personnel
Commentator	Todd Keneley
Commentator	Mike Tenay
Commentator	Taz
Ring announcer	Jeremy Borash
Referee	Rudy Charles
Referee	Mark "Slick" Johnson
Referee	Andrew Thomas
Interviewers	Jeremy Borash

Genesis featured nine professional wrestling matches that involved different wrestlers from pre-existing scripted feuds and storylines. Wrestlers portrayed villains, heroes, or less distinguishable characters in the scripted events that built tension and culminated in a wrestling match or series of matches.

At Final Resolution, Bobby Roode fell to defeat in his TNA World Heavyweight Championship match with the reigning champion Jeff Hardy, despite the fact that he made a business deal in exchange for help from the Aces & Eights group, who didn't follow through accordingly. On the December 13, 2012 edition of Impact Wrestling, an irate Roode demanded answers for the desertion. In a turn of events, it was disclosed that his rival Austin Aries had paid off a better bid to the group. Hardy would then criticize Aries' attempt to get help from the Aces & Eights to win back the championship and proposed defending the title against Aries as part of their third encounter the next week. During the match between Aries and Hardy, however, Roode intervened ensuring a loss for Aries while the referee was out. The following week on the December 27 and last Impact Wrestling episode of the year, Aries admitted Roode was now even with him on screwing each other over, and for Roode's actions of costing him the title match, declared that he would face Roode to determine who would challenge Hardy for the belt. That night, Aries and Roode fought to a double disqualification after the two of them assaulted the referee, who interrupted their argument during the bout; this brought out Hardy who attacked the two of them. On the January 3, 2013 edition of Impact Wrestling when Hardy was announced as the "2012 TNA Wrestler of the Year", which made Roode and Aries emerge in disagreement to refer to their accolades in the past year, Hardy stated that he would be competing against Roode and Aries at Genesis prior to all three engaging in a physical confrontation.

Another feud featured at Genesis was between Sting and D.O.C. Sidelined by a storyline injury sustained from blows with a ball-peen hammer by D.O.C. and the Aces & Eights in November, Sting's return was advertised for the date of 1.3.13, which would be the date of the first episode of Impact Wrestling in the new year. On that night, D.O.C. called out Sting to come out and confront him. In response, a baseball bat fell from the ceiling signifying Sting playing mind games by not showing up. Later in the night, Sting interfered in Aces & Eights steel cage match with Kurt Angle and Samoa Joe, exacting his revenge on Aces & Eights with his signature bat. The next week, Sting said that he would be looking for D.O.C. at Genesis.

On the January 3 edition of Impact Wrestling, Christopher Daniels (with Kazarian) mocked James Storm for not winning the "2012 TNA Wrestler of the Year" award. A feud began when Storm reacted by spitting in Daniels' Appletini drink. Later that night, Storm defeated Kazarian in a one-on-one match. This feud would extend into the next week where Daniels and Kazarian distracted Storm from teaming with Jeff Hardy in their match against Bobby Roode and Austin Aries.

At Turning Point, Joseph Park battled D.O.C. in a losing effort. Thereafter, Park, depicted as inexperienced, enrolled in wrestling school with TNA's developmental base Ohio Valley Wrestling leading to a series of videos of Park's trial and errors learning the skill of wrestling. Park returned on the January 10 edition of Impact Wrestling pleading with TNA General Manager Hulk Hogan to give him a match facing a member of the Aces & Eights after having done everything Hogan asked of him, claiming that he made a comeback as a wrestler and not an attorney. Hogan, annoyed and still thinking he needed more time to train, granted him his request.

Rob Van Dam put Kenny King down for the victory at Final Resolution. On the following Impact Wrestling episode, Kenny King was able to defeat Van Dam sneakily using the ropes as leverage for a pinfall. King the next week claimed that he had nothing against Van Dam than wanting to get even. When pit to partner with Van Dam that night against Joey Ryan and Matt Morgan, King bailed on Van Dam, leaving Ryan and Morgan to secure the win. King confident Van Dam would call him out for a match, Van Dam instead called out who he said he respected, Christian York, on the December 27, 2012 Open Fight Fight edition of Impact Wrestling, beating York in the proceedings. York entered the X Division Tournament a week later advancing over Kid Kash, while King defeated Zema Ion the following week, essentially setting up a match between York and King at Genesis, where the winner would face Van Dam for the TNA X Division Championship at the same event.

Samoa Joe versus Mr. Anderson was another match scheduled for the event. This match was made amidst a rekindled feud among Kurt Angle and Mr. Anderson, who had recently joined the villainous Aces & Eights group. With Samoa Joe being allies with Angle, who was taken out of commission with a ball-peen hammer by Aces & Eights member Mike Knox, the match between Joe and Anderson was set.

After both teams of Chavo Guerrero Jr. and Hernandez as well as Joey Ryan and Matt Morgan collected wins for over two weeks, Hernandez squared off with Joey Ryan in a match that ended in a disqualification when Morgan interfered to hit a clothesline offensive maneuver on Hernandez. A brawl the next week between the two teams cemented their match for the TNA World Tag Team Championship at Genesis.

A Gauntlet match was scheduled to decide a number one contender to the TNA Knockout Championship between Velvet Sky, ODB, Miss Tessmacher, Mickie James, and Gail Kim.

== Results ==
No.	Results	Stipulations	Times
1	Chavo Guerrero and Hernandez (c) defeated Joey Ryan and Matt Morgan	Tag team match for the TNA World Tag Team Championship	11:30
2	Mr. Anderson defeated Samoa Joe	Singles match	10:45
3	Christian York defeated Kenny King	Singles match	10:12
4	Rob Van Dam (c) defeated Christian York	Singles match for the TNA X Division Championship	05:30
5	Devon defeated Joseph Park	Singles match	11:17
6	Velvet Sky won by last eliminating Gail Kim	Gauntlet match to determine the #1 contender to the TNA Women's Knockout Championship	11:55
7	Christopher Daniels (with Kazarian) defeated James Storm	Singles match	13:25
8	Sting defeated D.O.C.	Singles match	05:53
9	Jeff Hardy (c) defeated Austin Aries and Bobby Roode	Three-Way Elimination match for the TNA World Heavyweight Championship	20:32
(c) / – the champion(s) heading into the match

=== Tournament bracket ===
Semifinals
1	Kid Kash	3:44
4	Christian York	Pin
3	Zema Ion	3:05
2	Kenny King	Pin

Final
Christian York	Pin
Kenny King	10:12

=== Knockouts gauntlet match ===
Elimination	Entered	Wrestler	Eliminated by	Elimination move	Time
1	2	Miss Tessmacher	Gail Kim	Pinned after an Eat Defeat	02:43
2	3	ODB	Gail Kim	Pinned after falling off the top rope	06:14
3	4	Mickie James	Gail Kim	Pinned by a schoolgirl	09:19
4	1	Gail Kim	Velvet Sky	Pinned after an In Yo' Face	11:55
Winner:	Velvet Sky				

=== Three-way elimination match ===
Elimination	Wrestler	Eliminated by	Elimination move	Time
1	Bobby Roode	Austin Aries and Jeff Hardy	Pinned by a backslide pin by Aries and a split leg pin by Hardy	18:50
2	Austin Aries	Jeff Hardy	Pinned after a Swanton Bomb	20:32
Winner:	Jeff Hardy			

== See also ==
- 2013 in professional wrestling
