= Garett Bischoff =

American professional wrestler and referee (born 1984)

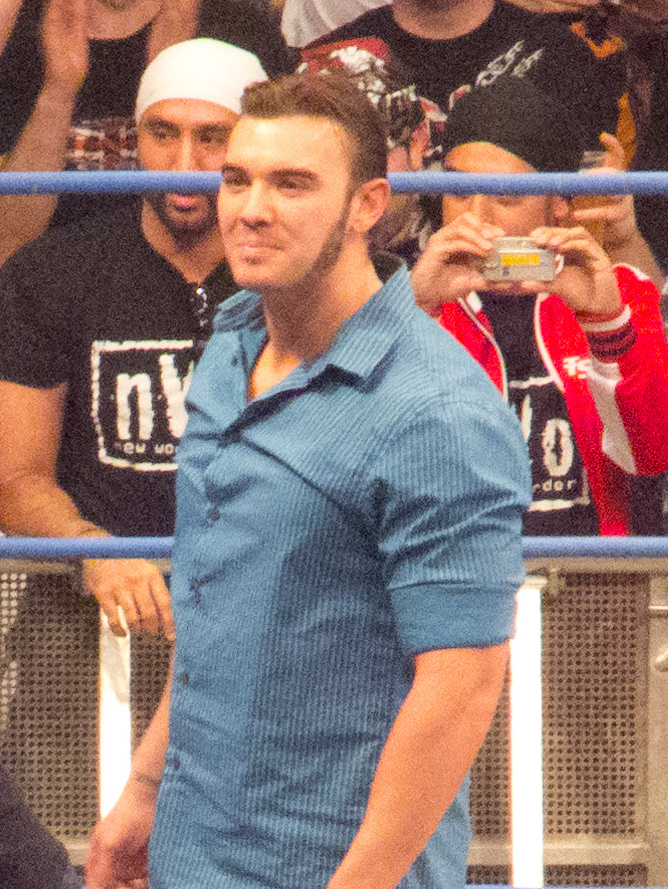
- Bischoff in 2012

Personal information
- Born: April 20, 1984 (age 42) Arizona, U.S.
- Parent: Eric Bischoff (father)

Professional wrestling career
- Ring name(s): Garett Bischoff; Jackson James
- Billed height: 6 ft 0 in (1.83 m)
- Billed weight: 220 lb (100 kg)
- Billed from: Orlando, Florida
- Trained by: Gangrel
- Debut: November 7, 2010

Garett Bischoff (born April 20, 1984) is an American professional wrestler. He is best known for his time in Total Nonstop Action Wrestling (TNA) and is the son of pro-wrestling executive and personality Eric Bischoff.

== Early life ==
Bischoff was born in 1984 to Eric and Loree Bischoff. He studied Firearms Technology at the Sonoran Desert Institute in Tempe, AZ. Bischoff owns a clothing line called One Bad Cat Inc.

== Professional wrestling career ==
=== Total Nonstop Action Wrestling ===
==== Immortal and feud with Eric Bischoff (2010–2012) ====
Bischoff made his debut as a referee for Total Nonstop Action Wrestling, under the ring name Jackson James on November 7, 2010 at Turning Point. Garett was officially revealed (in wrestling storylines) during a match between Sting and Hulk Hogan on October 16, 2011 at Bound for Glory as Eric Bischoff's son when Garett reluctantly called the ring bell for a submission, which led to Eric hitting his son with a steel chair following the match, starting a rivalry between the two, in the process of removing him from Immortal and turning face.

On the November 10, 2011, edition of Impact Wrestling, Bischoff made his wrestling debut against Gunner and won by disqualification after Ric Flair interfered. On the November 17 edition of Impact Wrestling, Bischoff defeated Gunner again, this time by pinfall. On the December 8 edition of Impact Wrestling, Bischoff defeated Gunner again, but after the match Gunner would piledrive him into the concrete floor, injuring him in storyline. Garett returned on the January 5, 2012, edition of Impact Wrestling, in a backstage segment where Sting told him that he was no longer a referee and was being officially welcomed to the roster. On the February 2 edition of Impact Wrestling, the returning Hulk Hogan was revealed as Bischoff's trainer. On February 12 at Against All Odds, Bischoff, with Hogan in his corner, was defeated by Gunner, who had Eric Bischoff in his corner, in a singles match. On the March 8 edition of Impact Wrestling, Bischoff teamed up with Jeff Hardy to defeat Gunner and Kurt Angle in his first main event. On the March 15 and 22 editions of Impact Wrestling, Bischoff would survive two beat the clock challenges against Angle, first in five minutes and second in three. On April 15 at Lockdown, Garett and his father captained opposing teams in the annual Lethal Lockdown match. Garett won the match for his team by pinning Eric, forcing his father out of TNA in the process.

==== Aces & Eights (2012–2015) ====
On the May 24 episode of Impact Wrestling, Bischoff received his first shot at the TNA Television Championship, but his match with Devon ended in a no contest, following interference from Robbie E and Robbie T. Following the match, Bischoff and Devon united to fend off the attack by the two. On June 10 at Slammiversary, Bischoff and Devon defeated the Robbies in a tag team match. Bischoff returned to Impact Wrestling on August 9, when he and Devon unsuccessfully challenged Christopher Daniels and Kazarian for the TNA World Tag Team Championship. Bischoff's alliance with Devon ended on August 29, after Devon announced he had parted ways with TNA. However, Devon returned to TNA in October, as a member of the villainous Aces & Eights stable. On the November 15 episode of Impact Wrestling, Bischoff teamed with Kurt Angle to defeat Devon and a masked member of Aces & Eights in a tag team match, despite outside interference from the rest of Aces & Eights and Wes Brisco. On December 9 at Final Resolution, Bischoff teamed with Kurt Angle, Samoa Joe, and Wes Brisco to defeat Devon, D.O.C., and two masked members of Aces & Eights in an eight-man tag team match. On the following episode of Impact Wrestling, Bischoff and Brisco teamed up to defeat Robbie E and Robbie T in a tag team match.

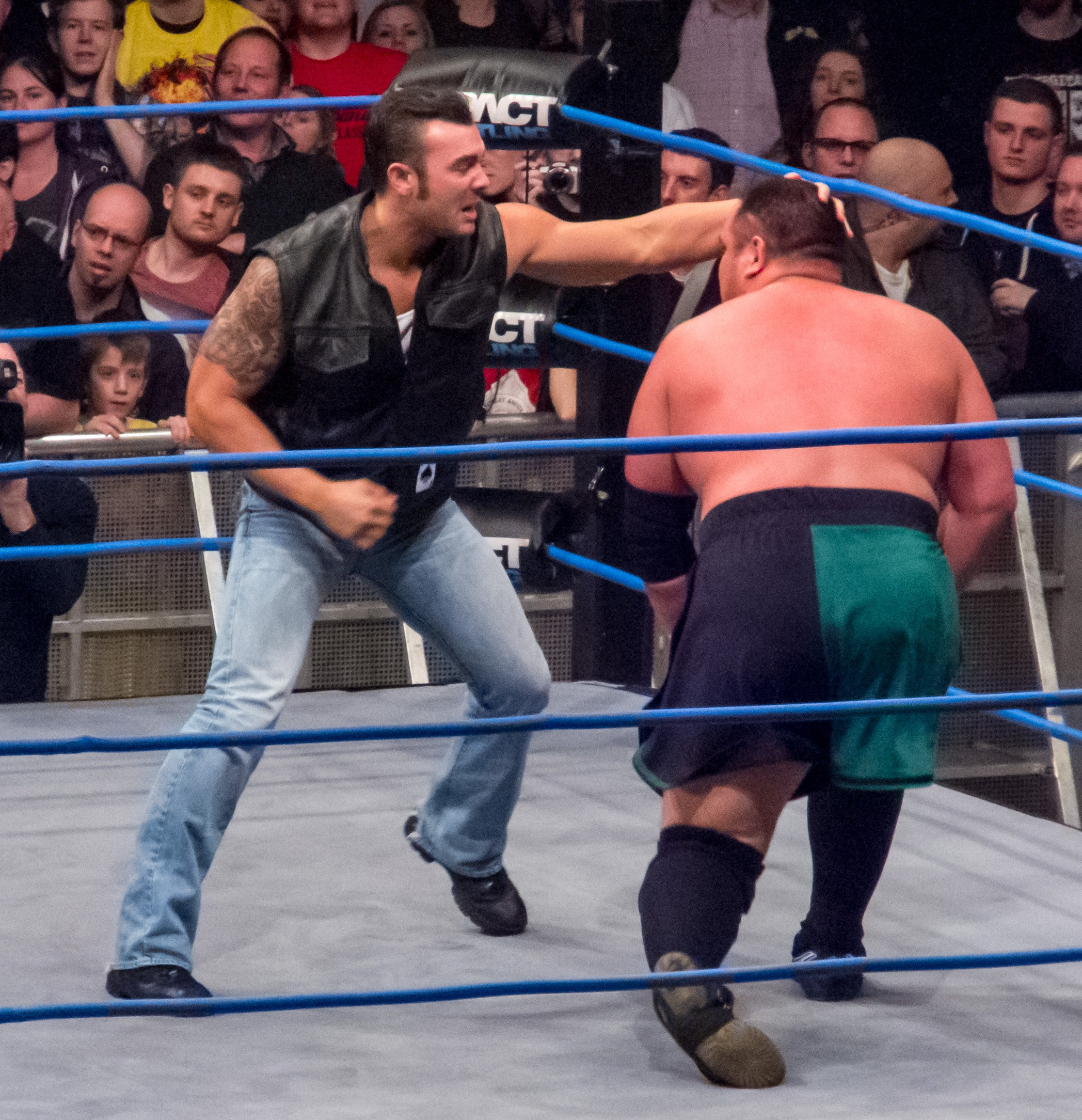
Bischoff as member of Aces & Eights, attacking Samoa Joe.

On the January 31 episode of Impact Wrestling, Bischoff and Brisco revealed themselves as members of Aces & Eights and attacked Kurt Angle, turning heel again in the process. Bischoff explained his turn the following week, claiming he got no respect from the fans. On March 10 at Lockdown, Aces & Eights, consisting of Bischoff, Devon, DOC, Knux, and Mr. Anderson were defeated by Team TNA, consisting of Eric Young, James Storm, Magnus, Samoa Joe, and Sting in a Lethal Lockdown match. Bischoff and Wes Brisco defeated Kurt Angle the following week and then again the week after. On the September 5 episode of Impact Wrestling, Bischoff and Brisco defeated the TNA World Tag Team Champions James Storm and Gunner in a non-title match.

On November 7 episode of Impact Wrestling, Bischoff and Knux hosted a club voting with Taz to disband Aces & Eights after showing contempt toward Bully Ray's selfish and autocratic ways, but it turned out to be a hoax as ousted member Mr. Anderson was attacked by Knux, Bischoff and Bully Ray. On the following episode of Impact Wrestling, Anderson attacked Bischoff with a pile-driver following the match between Kurt Angle and Austin Aries, with Bobby Roode looking on at the ramp.

After over a year of being on hiatus from TNA on April 1, 2015, Bischoff's profile was removed from the TNA roster page, confirming his departure from the company. In May 2015, the Bischoffs and Jason Hervey filed a lawsuit against TNA for unpaid salary.

=== Independent circuit (2014–present) ===
On June 13, 2014, Bischoff made his debut in National Wrestling Alliance Florida Underground Wrestling defeating The Grease. On August 1, Bischoff reunited again with Wes Brisco to defeat The Grease and JD Maverick. On August 2, 2014, Bischoff defeated JD Maverick. On August 23, at a NWA Signature Pro event, Bischoff and Wes Brisco defeated JD Maverick and Mikey Batts. On November 30, Bischoff competing under the ring name Jackson James teamed with Chip Sterling to defeat Lance Lude and Zane Riley.

On March 5, 2015, Bischoff made his debut at Coastal Wrestling Federation (CWF) in Houston, Texas, defeating Santana, Slam Shady, Lee Megidoo.

After a four-year hiatus, Bischoff, then 34, returned to mat action in 2018 at a Legends Of Wrestling event on April 21, where he was defeated by Billy Gunn. Bischoff then returned in action at Atomic Revolutionary Wrestling to team with his friend Wes Brisco, with whom he won the ARW Tag Team Championship one time.

=== Return to Impact Wrestling (2022) ===
Bischoff reportedly returned at May TV tapings with D'Lo Brown and Wes Brisco, as members of Aces and Eights.

== Championships and accomplishments ==
- Atomic Revolutionary Wrestling
  - ARW Next Level Championship (1 time)
  - ARW Tag Team Championship (1 time) - with Wes Brisco
- Pro Wrestling Illustrated
  - Ranked No. 235 of the top 500 wrestlers in the PWI 500 in 2013
- Wrestling Observer Newsletter
  - Worst Gimmick (2013) Aces & Eights
