= TNA Genesis (2014) =

2014 wrestling event

Genesis (2014)
- Promotion: Total Nonstop Action Wrestling
- Date: January 16, 2014 (aired January 16, 2014 and January 23, 2014)
- City: Huntsville, Alabama
- Venue: Von Braun Center
- Attendance: 1,400
- Tagline: Live and Free on Spike

Genesis chronology
← Previous; 2013	Next → 2017

Impact Wrestling special episodes chronology
← Previous; Final Resolution	Next → Destination X

The 2014 Genesis was a special episode of Impact Wrestling and the ninth edition of Genesis professional wrestling event produced by Total Nonstop Action Wrestling (TNA), which took place on January 16, 2014 at the Von Braun Center in Huntsville, Alabama. The card was split between both the January 16 and the January 23 broadcasts of Impact Wrestling on Spike TV.

Four matches were contested on the January 16 broadcast, featuring the main event between Sting and Ethan Carter III while the undercard featured Gail Kim defending the Knockouts Championship against Madison Rayne and Mr. Anderson taking on Bully Ray in a No Disqualification match.

The January 23 broadcast featured five matches as Magnus defended the World Heavyweight Championship against Sting in a no disqualification title vs. career match. Prominent matches on the undercard were Kurt Angle versus Bobby Roode in a steel cage match, Chris Sabin versus Austin Aries for the X Division Championship and Gunner defended the World Heavyweight Championship Feast or Fired Briefcase on a pole match against James Storm.

== Storylines ==
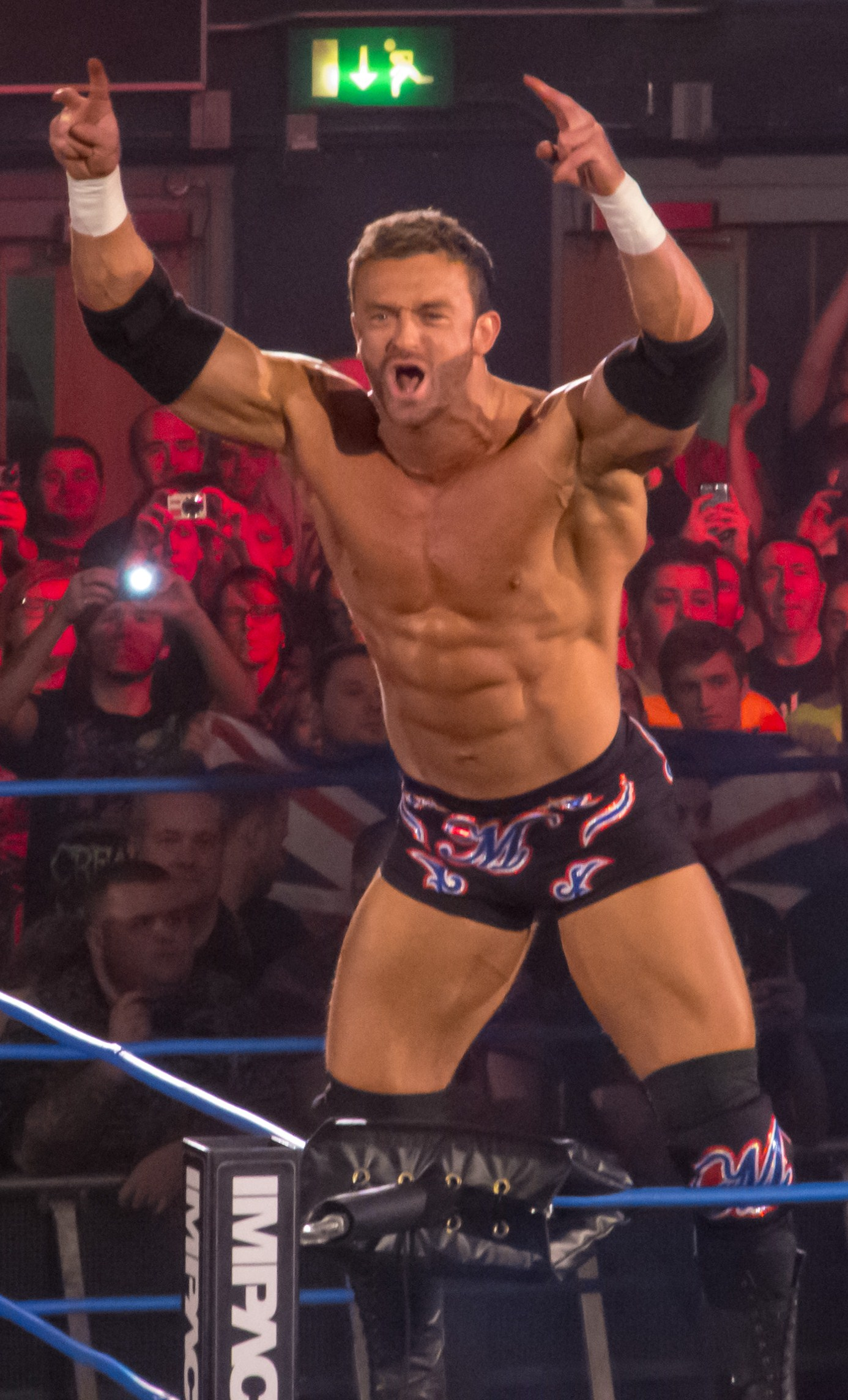
Magnus defended the TNA World Heavyweight Championship against Sting in a no disqualification title vs. career match in the main event of Genesis night two.

On the December 5 episode of Impact Wrestling, Rockstar Spud prevented Sting from meeting Kurt Angle in his locker room as per Dixie Carter's orders as she wanted Sting out of the arena. The following week, on Impact Wrestling, Sting confronted Carter's kayfabe nephew Ethan Carter III and gave him the ultimatum of either facing Sting or enter the Feast or Fired and Carter chose to enter the Feast or Fired. On the December 26 episode of Impact Wrestling, Sting and Hardy lost to EC3, Spud and The BroMans in a handicap match made by Dixie Carter. On the January 2 episode of Impact Wrestling, Sting accused EC3 of being Dixie's lapdog and challenged him to a match at Genesis, which EC3 accepted.

At Final Resolution, Bobby Roode defeated Kurt Angle in a two out of three falls match. The feud continued as Angle demanded a steel cage match against Roode on the January 9, 2014 episode of Impact Wrestling but he was put in the match instead against Roode's partners Bad Influence, whom Angle defeated. Roode would then be put in a steel cage match against Sting, which Roode won with the outside interference by Rockstar Spud. It was later announced that Angle would take on Roode in a steel cage match at Genesis.

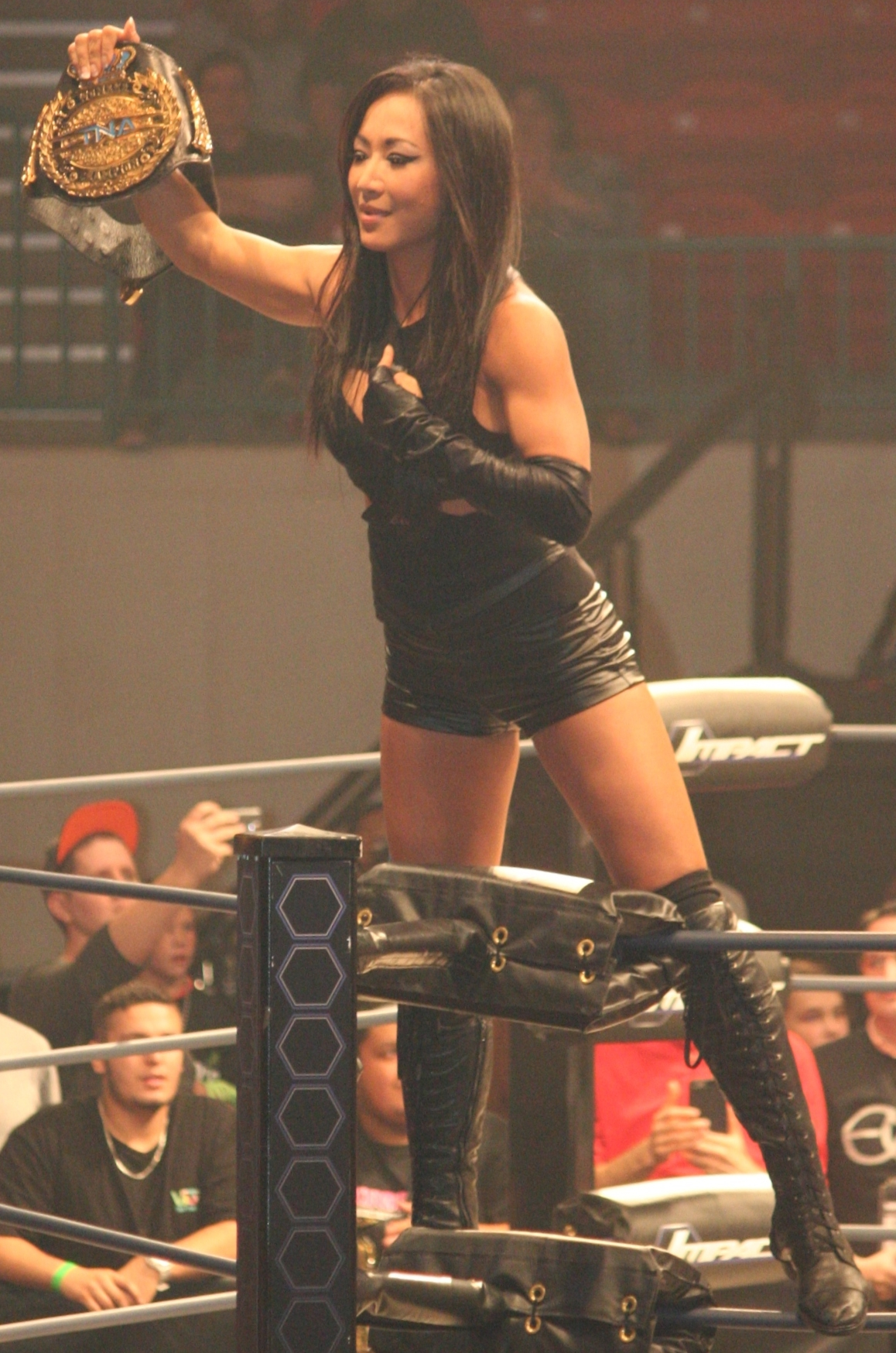
Gail Kim defended the TNA Knockouts Championship against Madison Rayne at night one of Genesis.

At Turning Point, Mr. Anderson defeated Bully Ray in a No Disqualification match to end Ray's faction Aces & Eights and save his TNA career. On the November 28 episode of Impact Wrestling, Anderson held a mock funeral of the Aces & Eights. Ray gained revenge on Anderson on the December 12 episode of Impact Wrestling by piledriving Anderson on the stage during Anderson's Feast or Fired match. On the January 2, 2014 episode of Impact Wrestling, Ray was about to burn Joseph Park with a lighter after covering him with the lighter fluid until Anderson made the save and Ray sprayed fluid on him. The following week, on Impact Wrestling, Anderson and Ray decided to settle their differences by agreeing to a no disqualification match at Genesis.

At Turning Point, Gunner threw in the towel for James Storm during his Florida Death match against Bobby Roode to prevent Roode from tossing Storm into the barbed wire board. Storm confronted Gunner on costing him the match, which caused dissension between the two. On the December 12 episode of Impact Wrestling, Gunner retrieved a Feast or Fired briefcase which was revealed to contain a World Heavyweight Championship title shot. On the December 26 episode of Impact Wrestling, Gunner demanded a title shot against the new champion Magnus but Storm demanded that Gunner put the title shot against Storm on the line and Dixie Carter made the match, which ended in a double count-out. On the January 9 episode of Impact Wrestling, Storm challenged Gunner to put the briefcase on the line in a Briefcase on a pole match.

At Final Resolution, Madison Rayne and ODB defeated Gail Kim and Lei'D Tapa in a tag team match. On the December 26 episode of Impact Wrestling, Kim helped Tapa in defeating ODB in a match and sent the match as a message to Rayne. The following week, on Impact Wrestling, Rayne defeated Kim in a non-title match. This led to a match between Kim and ODB for Kim's Knockouts Championship at Genesis.

At Bound for Glory, Chris Sabin defeated Manik, Austin Aries, Jeff Hardy and Samoa Joe in an Ultimate X match to win the X Division Championship. On the December 12 episode of Impact Wrestling, Aries defeated Sabin to win the X Division Championship after a distraction by Velvet Sky backfired. However, Sabin regained the title from Aries, with Sky's help on the January 2 episode of Impact Wrestling. It was announced that Sabin would defend the title against Aries in a rematch at Genesis.

== Event ==
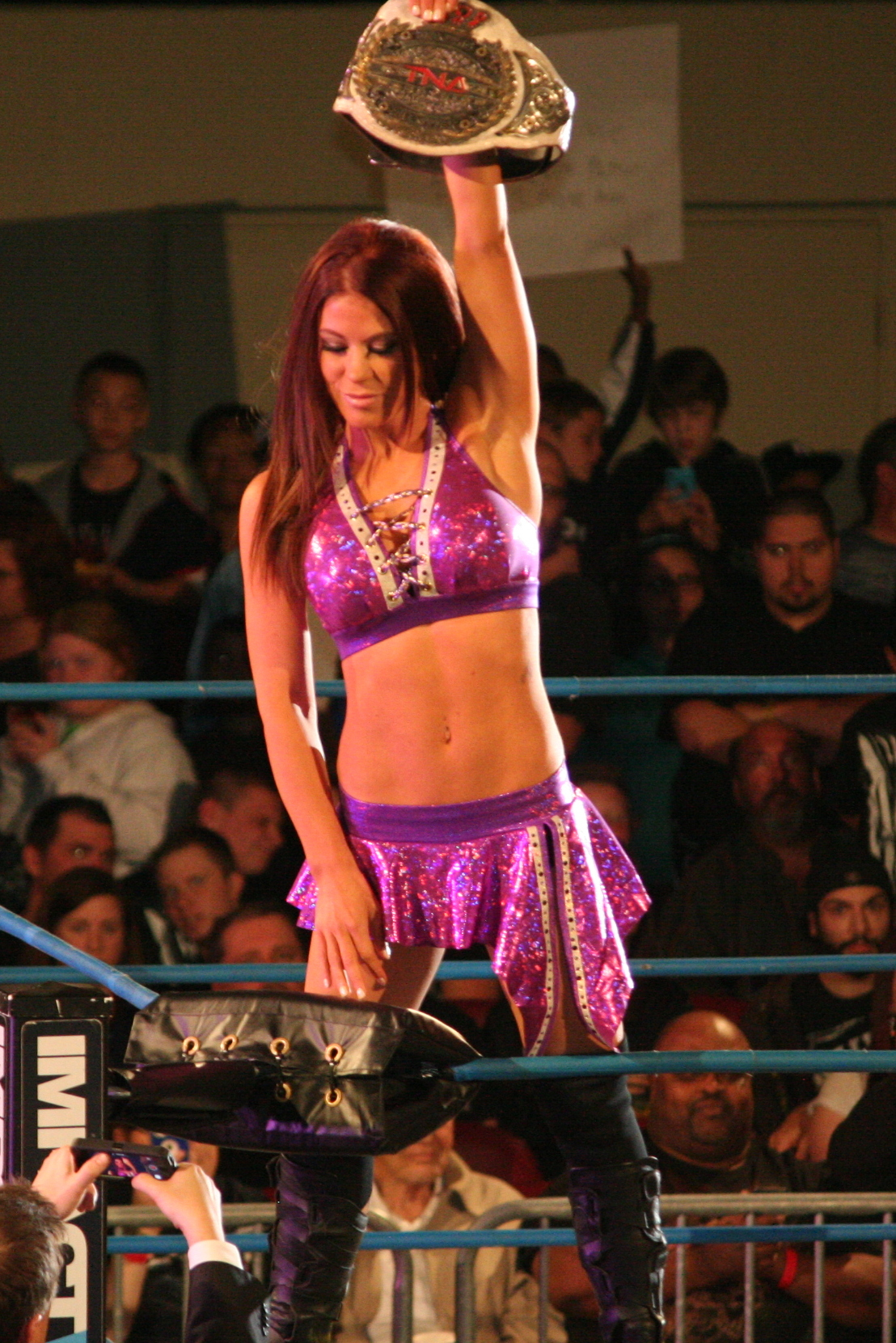
Madison Rayne defeated Gail Kim to win the TNA Knockouts Championship at Genesis.

=== Night 1 ===
==== Preliminary matches ====
The opening match was a twelve-person tag team match pitting Samoa Joe, James Storm, Gunner, Eric Young, Joseph Park and ODB against The BroMans (Jessie Godderz and Robbie E), Zema Ion, Bad Influence (Christopher Daniels and Kazarian) and Lei'D Tapa. After a back and forth action between both teams, Joe made Daniels submit to the Coquina Clutch for the win.

Next, Mr. Anderson took on Bully Ray in a no disqualification match. Anderson attacked Ray before the match during Ray's entrance. After hitting a Mic Check on Ray, Anderson sprayed lighter fluid on a table and was about to light it but Ray hit a low blow and a piledriver to Anderson for the win.

Gail Kim was scheduled to defend the Knockouts Championship against Madison Rayne in the penultimate match of the episode but Kim and Lei D'Tapa attacked her before the match. Rayne competed in the match despite the assault. Rayne hit a facebreaker knee smash to Kim and pinned her to win the Knockouts Championship.

After the match, The Wolves (Davey Richards and Eddie Edwards) made their TNA debut in a segment with Dixie Carter, informing her that they had signed their TNA contracts as full-time wrestlers.

==== Main event match ====
In the main event, Sting took on Ethan Carter III, with Rockstar Spud serving as the special guest referee. Sting hit a Scorpion Death Drop to EC3 and forcefully used Spud's hand to count the pinfall but the World Heavyweight Champion Magnus broke the pinfall count and revealed a referee shirt underneath, which allowed EC3 to take advantage of the distraction and pin Sting with a roll-up for the win.

=== Night 2 ===
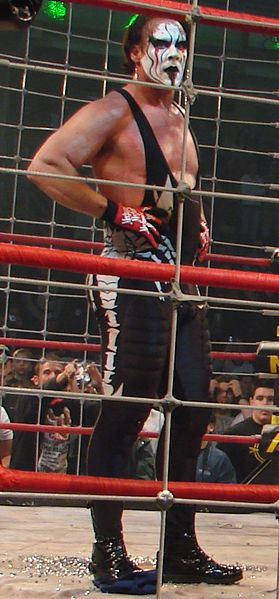
Sting competed in the main events of both nights of Genesis; his match against Magnus at night two for the World Heavyweight Championship turned out to be his final match in TNA.

==== Preliminary matches ====
The opening match was a Briefcase on a pole match, in which Gunner defended his World Heavyweight Championship Feast or Fired contract against James Storm. Storm and Gunner brought the briefcase down from the pole after Storm got his hands on it and Gunner attacked him and then Gunner hit a headbutt to Storm, who fell down and Gunner retrieved the case for the win.

Next, Chris Sabin defended the X Division Championship against Austin Aries. Sabin handed over a bag to Velvet Sky containing a teddy bear and a lead pipe but once he got the bag, it only contained a teddy bear which rendered him unable to use the lead pipe on Aries. It allowed Aries to hit a double axe handle from the apron to Sabin followed by a missile dropkick and a brainbuster to win the X Division Championship.

Later, Kurt Angle took on Bobby Roode in a steel cage match. After a back and forth action between the two, Angle climbed out of the cage first to win the match.

The penultimate match of the event pitted Rockstar Spud against Samoa Joe. Joe quickly won the match by hitting a muscle buster and making Spud submit to the Coquina Clutch.

==== Main event match ====
The main event was a no disqualification match, in which Magnus defended the World Heavyweight Championship against Sting and the match stipulated that if Sting lost then he would have to leave TNA. Ethan Carter III interfered earlier in the match but Samoa Joe countered his interference, which led to Bad Influence attacking Joe as Sting tried to apply the Scorpion Deathlock. Next, Zema Ion and The BroMans interfered as Sting hit a Scorpion Death Drop to Magnus and then Kurt Angle and Bobby Roode interfered in the match as well. The interference allowed Magnus to hit a Mag Daddy Driver to Sting and Dixie Carter brought Earl Hebner to count the pinfall, resulting in Magnus retaining the title and Sting being forced to leave TNA.

== Aftermath ==
On the January 30 episode of Impact Wrestling, Kurt Angle and Samoa Joe confronted Magnus on the retirement of Sting and his ill behavior since being inducted into the Main Event Mafia and it led to a tag team match pitting Angle and Joe against Magnus and Ethan Carter III, which stipulated that if Angle or Joe lost then they would be forced to retire and if any of them scored the pinfall or submission then the winner would receive a World Heavyweight Championship title match against Magnus at Lockdown. Joe made Magnus submit, thus becoming the #1 contender for the title at Lockdown.

Madison Rayne continued her feud with Gail Kim and Lei D'Tapa as Rayne and Velvet Sky defeated Kim and D'Tapa on the January 30 episode of Impact Wrestling. On the February 20 episode of Impact Wrestling, Kim defeated Rayne in a street fight, thus resulting in a steel cage match between Rayne and Kim for the Knockouts Championship at Lockdown.

Mr. Anderson and Bully Ray continued their feud after Genesis as the two competed in a casket match on the February 13 episode of Impact Wrestling, which Anderson won.

Gunner and James Storm retained Gunner's World Heavyweight Championship Feast or Fired briefcase against Bad Influence on the January 30 episode of Impact Wrestling. They next retained it against Magnus and Ethan Carter III in a ladder match, which also contained EC3's World Tag Team Championship briefcase, thus also earning EC3's briefcase on the February 13 episode of Impact Wrestling. On the February 20 episode of Impact Wrestling, Gunner cashed in his Feast or Fired briefcase against Magnus, during which Storm turned on Gunner by costing him the title, which led to a steel cage last man standing match between Gunner and Storm at Lockdown.

On the January 30 episode of Impact Wrestling, Chris Sabin offered Velvet Sky to apologize to him for costing him the X Division Championship at Genesis but Sky broke it off with him. On the February 13 episode of Impact Wrestling, Sabin defeated Sky with the help of Alpha Female. On the March 6 episode of Impact Wrestling, Sky teamed with Madison Rayne and ODB to defeat Kim, D'Tapa and Female in a six-woman tag team match.

Montel Vontavious Porter made his TNA debut on the January 30 episode of Impact Wrestling and was revealed as the new investor of TNA. MVP had confrontations with Dixie Carter over power struggle throughout the following weeks, leading to a Lethal Lockdown match between Team MVP (MVP, Willow and The Wolves) against Team Dixie (Bobby Roode, The BroMans and Austin Aries) at Lockdown.

== Results ==
January 16 results
No.	Results	Stipulations	Times
1	Samoa Joe, James Storm, Gunner, Eric Young, Joseph Park and ODB defeated The BroMans (Jessie Godderz and Robbie E), Zema Ion, Bad Influence (Christopher Daniels and Kazarian) and Lei'D Tapa	12-person intergender tag team match	8:00
2	Bully Ray defeated Mr. Anderson	No Disqualification match	10:00
3	Madison Rayne defeated Gail Kim (c) (with Lei'D Tapa)	Singles match for the TNA Knockouts Championship	4:10
4	Ethan Carter III defeated Sting	Singles match with Special Guest Referees Rockstar Spud and Magnus	5:05
(c) / – the champion(s) heading into the match

January 23 results
No.	Results	Stipulations	Times
1	Gunner defeated James Storm	World Heavyweight Championship Feast or Fired Briefcase on a pole match	05:39
2	Austin Aries defeated Chris Sabin (c)	Singles match for the TNA X Division Championship	05:08
3	Kurt Angle defeated Bobby Roode	Steel Cage match	14:14
4	Samoa Joe defeated Rockstar Spud via technical submission	Singles match	02:17
5	Magnus (c) defeated Sting (with Samoa Joe)	No Disqualification Title vs. Career match for the TNA World Heavyweight Championship	13:27
(c) / – the champion(s) heading into the match
