= Final Resolution (2013) =

- Promotion: Total Nonstop Action Wrestling
- Date: December 3, 2013 (aired December 19, 2013)
- City: Orlando, Florida
- Venue: Impact Wrestling Zone
- Attendance: 680
- Tagline: Live and Free on Spike

Final Resolution chronology
← Previous; 2012	Next → 2020

Impact Wrestling special episodes chronology
← Previous; Turning Point	Next → Genesis

The 2013 Final Resolution was the tenth Final Resolution professional wrestling event produced by Total Nonstop Action Wrestling (TNA), which took take place on December 3, 2013 and was aired on tape delay on December 19, 2013 at the Impact Zone in Orlando, Florida. Unlike the previous events, this event was not held on pay-per-view (PPV) and instead, like Destination X, Hardcore Justice, No Surrender and Turning Point was featured as a special edition of TNA's weekly broadcast of Impact Wrestling.

Three matches took place at the event. The main event was a Dixieland match, the tournament final for the vacant TNA World Heavyweight Championship between Magnus and Jeff Hardy, which Magnus won, thus winning his first World Heavyweight Championship in TNA. The undercard featured a 2-out-of-3 falls match between Kurt Angle and Bobby Roode and a knockouts tag team match pitting ODB and Madison Rayne against Gail Kim and Lei'D Tapa. The event also featured the unveiling of the Feast or Fired briefcases that were won on the previous week's episode of Impact Wrestling.

== Storylines ==
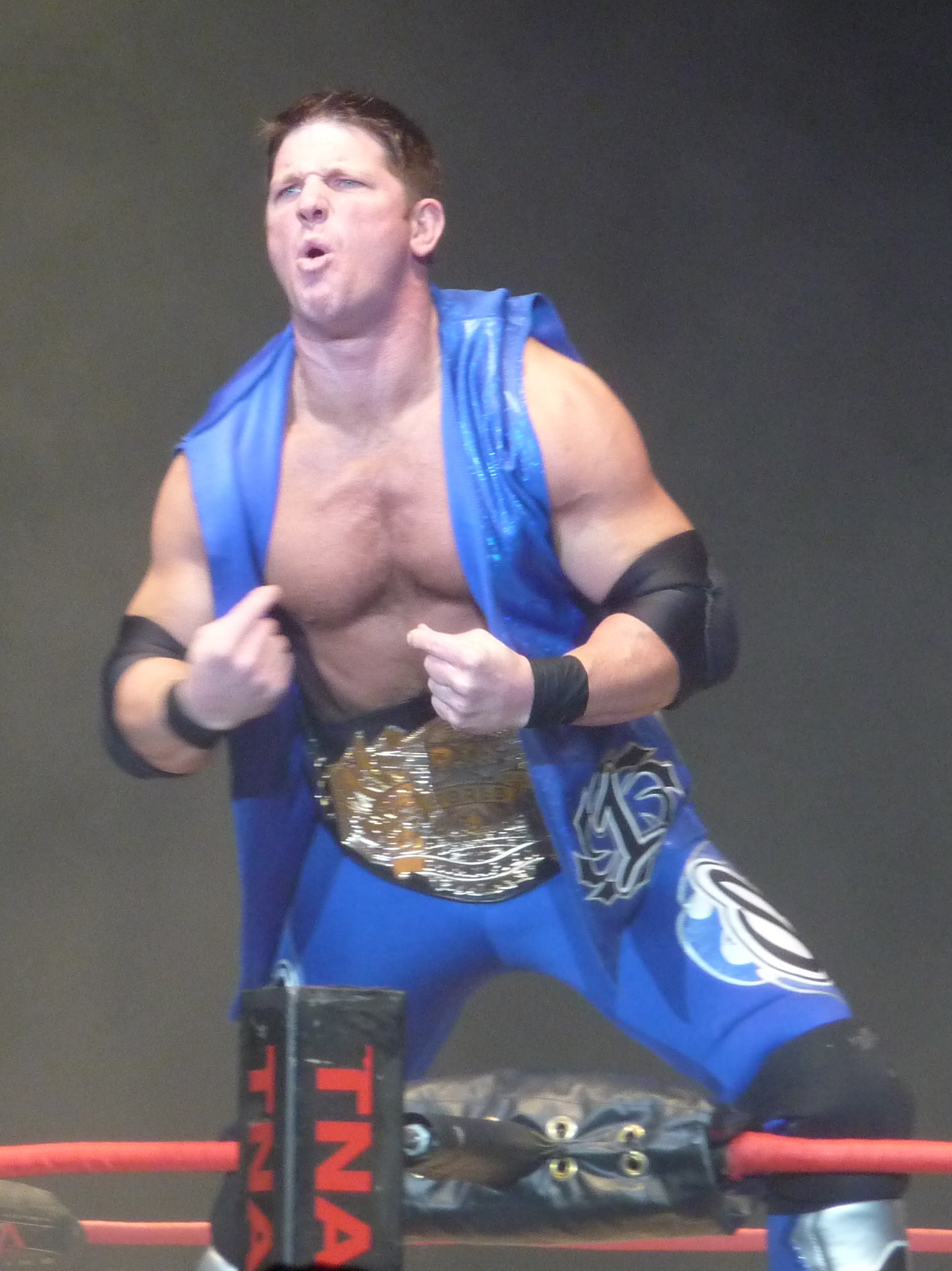
The TNA World Heavyweight Championship was vacated after reigning champion A.J. Styles "quit" TNA and a tournament was set up to crown the new champion.

At Bound for Glory, A.J. Styles defeated Bully Ray to win the TNA World Heavyweight Championship. After retaining the title against Ray in a rematch on the October 24 episode of Impact Wrestling, Styles refused to sign Dixie Carter's new contract and opted to leave TNA with the title belt. The following week, on Impact Wrestling, Carter announced that she did not recognize Styles as her champion and a new eight-man tournament would take place to crown a new champion with Bobby Roode, James Storm, Kurt Angle, Chris Sabin, Samoa Joe, Jeff Hardy and Austin Aries announced as participants in the tournament, with the eighth man being determined via a gauntlet match later in the night, which Magnus won. Carter announced that all of the matches would have special stipulations that would be determined by her spinwheel called "Wheel of Dixie". In the first round, Hardy defeated Sabin in a Full Metal Mayhem match on the November 7 Impact Wrestling, Angle defeated Aries in a submission match on the November 14 Impact Wrestling, Roode defeated Storm in a Florida Death match and Magnus defeated Joe in a Falls Count Anywhere match at Turning Point. The tournament continued on the December 5 episode of Impact Wrestling, where Hardy defeated Roode in a Tables match and Magnus defeated Angle in a Last Man Standing match in the semi-final round. On the December 12 episode of Impact Wrestling, Angle destroyed the Wheel of Dixie which led to Dixie Carter making the tournament final between Hardy and Magnus, a Dixieland match, which she announced would take place at Final Resolution.

At Bound for Glory, Kurt Angle refused to be inducted into the TNA Hall of Fame and lost his match to Bobby Roode. The two had a rematch on the October 31 episode of Impact Wrestling, which Angle lost via referee stoppage due to an injury. Roode would then cost Angle, a Last Man Standing match against Magnus in the semifinals of the World Heavyweight Championship tournament on the December 5 episode of Impact Wrestling. The following week, on Impact Wrestling, Angle destroyed Jeremy Borash's presentation of the Wheel of Dixie and the briefcases of the Feast or Fired, which led to him challenging Roode to a fight and Roode said that he had beaten Angle since Angle was inducted into the Hall of Fame and Angle said he could beat Roode twice, which led to the two agreeing to a two out of three falls match at Final Resolution.

At Bound for Glory, Lei'D Tapa formed an alliance with Gail Kim by helping her in defeating ODB and Brooke in a three-way match to win the Knockouts Championship. On the December 12 episode of Impact Wrestling, Tapa and Kim double teamed ODB until Madison Rayne made the save. A tag team match was later made between the team of Tapa and Kim and the team of ODB and Rayne for Final Resolution.

On the December 12 episode of Impact Wrestling, a Feast or Fired match took place with Zema Ion, Gunner, Ethan Carter III and Chavo Guerrero Jr. retrieving the four briefcases of the match. It was announced that the briefcases would be unveiled at Final Resolution.

== Event ==
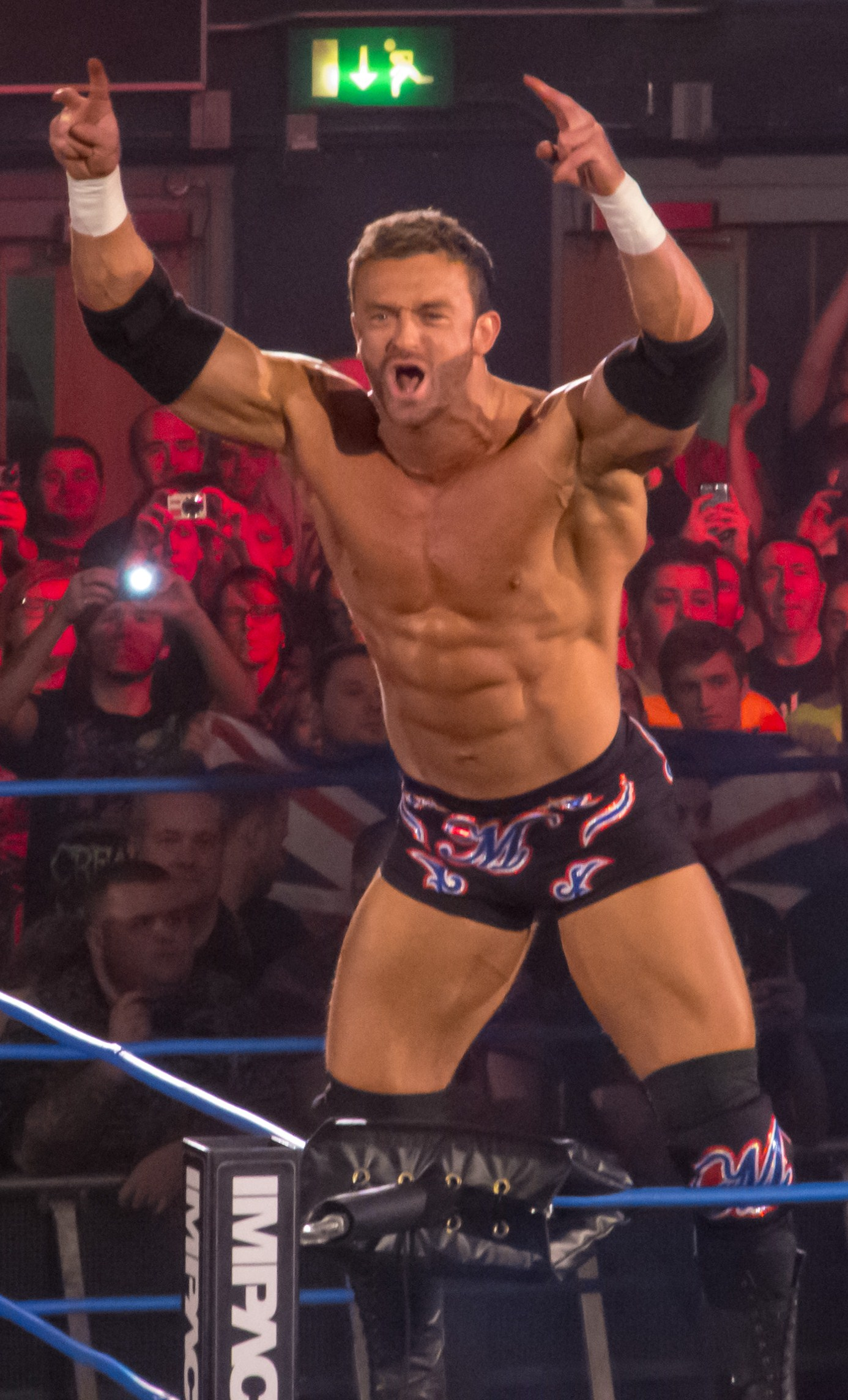
Magnus won his first TNA World Heavyweight Championship in the Dixieland match at Final Resolution.

=== Preliminary matches ===
The opening match of the event was a two out of three falls match between Kurt Angle and Bobby Roode. Roode avoided an Angle Slam and hit a low blow to Angle behind the referee and nailed a Death Valley driver to score the first fall. During the second fall, Angle countered a crossface attempt by Roode into an Angle Slam to score the second fall. Near the end of the match, Angle applied an ankle lock but Roode rolled through and pinned Angle with a roll-up by holding the ropes for leverage to win the match.

The four Feast or Fired briefcases were revealed backstage as Zema Ion's case contained a X Division Championship match, Gunner's case contained a World Heavyweight Championship match, Ethan Carter III's case contained a World Tag Team Championship match and Chavo Guerrero's case contained the pink slip, which resulted in Guerrero legitimately being fired from TNA.

The next match saw ODB and Madison Rayne take on the team of Gail Kim and Lei'D Tapa in a tag team match. Rayne countered an Eat Defeat attempt by Kim into a backslide for the win.

=== Main event match ===
The last match saw Jeff Hardy took on Magnus in a Dixieland match in the finals of the tournament for the vacant TNA World Heavyweight Championship. Ethan Carter III interfered in the match to prevent Magnus from winning the match. Later in the match, Rockstar Spud knocked Hardy off of the ladder, allowing Magnus to climb the ladder and retrieve the title belt for the win.

== Aftermath ==
Dixie Carter held a coronation for Magnus as the new World Heavyweight Champion on the January 2, 2014 episode of Impact Wrestling, which was interrupted by A.J. Styles, who claimed to be the real champion and challenged Magnus to a no disqualification title unification match on the January 9 episode of Impact Wrestling, where Magnus won the match to retain his title and become the undisputed champion. This resulted in Styles' legitimate exit from TNA. Magnus would then go on to begin feuding with Sting, which led to Sting taking on Magnus for the title in a no disqualification title vs. career match at Genesis, where Magnus retained the title, forcing Sting to leave TNA.

Kurt Angle and Bobby Roode continued their feud after Final Resolution, as the two competed in a steel cage match at Genesis, which Angle won to end the feud.

The feud of the Knockouts continued on the December 26 episode of Impact Wrestling, as Lei'D Tapa defeated ODB via knockout with Gail Kim's assist as Kim said that it was a message for Madison Rayne. Kim took on Rayne in a losing effort on the January 2 episode of Impact Wrestling. This led to Rayne defeating Kim to win the Knockouts Championship at Genesis. Also at the event, ODB and Tapa competed on opposing teams in a twelve-person intergender tag team match as ODB teamed with Samoa Joe, James Storm, Gunner, Eric Young and Joseph Park to defeat Tapa's team of Zema Ion, The BroMans and Bad Influence.

== Results ==
No.	Results	Stipulations	Times
1	Bobby Roode defeated Kurt Angle	2-out-of-3 falls match	14:46
2	ODB and Madison Rayne defeated Gail Kim and Lei'D Tapa	Tag team match	5:46
3	Magnus defeated Jeff Hardy	Dixieland match for the vacant TNA World Heavyweight Championship	17:42

=== TNA World Heavyweight Championship Tournament ===
First round Impact Wrestling; November 7, 2013 (Aired: November 7–14); Impact Wrestling: Turning Point; November 21, 2013
Chris Sabin	10:39
Jeff Hardy	Pinfall (Note: This was a Full Metal Mayhem match.)
Bobby Roode	Win (Note: This was a Florida Deathmatch.)
James Storm	12:00
Austin Aries	14:38
Kurt Angle	Submission (Note: This was a Submission match.)
Magnus	Win (Note: This was a Falls Count Anywhere match.)
Samoa Joe	11:18

Semifinals; Impact Wrestling; November 23, 2013 (Aired: December 5)
Jeff Hardy	Win (Note: This was a Tables match.)
Bobby Roode	13:52
Kurt Angle	15:22
Magnus	Win (Note: This was a Last Man Standing match.)

Final; Impact Wrestling: Final Resolution; December 3, 2013 (Aired: December 19)
Jeff Hardy	17:45
Magnus	Win (Note: This was a Dixieland match.)

== See also ==
- 2013 in professional wrestling
- List of Impact! special episodes
