= TNA Turning Point (2013) =

Turning Point (2013)
- Promotion: Total Nonstop Action Wrestling
- Date: November 21, 2013
- City: Orlando, Florida
- Venue: Impact Zone
- Attendance: 680
- Tagline: LIVE AND FREE on Spike TV

Turning Point chronology
← Previous; 2012	Next → 2015

Impact Wrestling special episodes chronology
← Previous; No Surrender	Next → Final Resolution

The 2013 Turning Point (also known as Impact Wrestling: Turning Point) was the tenth Turning Point professional wrestling event produced by Total Nonstop Action Wrestling (TNA). It took place on November 21, 2013 at the Impact Zone in Orlando, Florida. Unlike the previous events, this event was not aired on pay-per-view (PPV); instead, like Destination X, Hardcore Justice and No Surrender, it was featured as a special edition of TNA's weekly broadcast of Impact Wrestling.

Five matches were contested at the event. The main event was a no disqualification match between Mr. Anderson and Bully Ray, which stipulated that if Anderson won the Aces & Eights would be forced to disband and if Bully Ray won, Anderson would have been required to leave TNA. Anderson won, forcing Aces & Eights to disband. The event also featured two matches in the first round of the tournament for the vacant TNA World Heavyweight Championship including a Falls Count Anywhere match between Magnus and Samoa Joe and a Florida Death match between Bobby Roode and James Storm.

The event also featured the TNA re-debut of former Gut Check contestant Sam Shaw as Samuel Shaw.

== Production ==
=== Background ===
TNA discontinued most of its pay-per-view events in 2013 in favor of the pre-recorded One Night Only events and began running pay-per-view events on a quarterly basis per year. Turning Point had been produced as a TNA pay-per-view between 2004 and 2012 and was dropped as a pay-per-view event in 2013 and instead resumed as a special episode of TNA's flagship television program Impact Wrestling in 2013.

=== Storylines ===
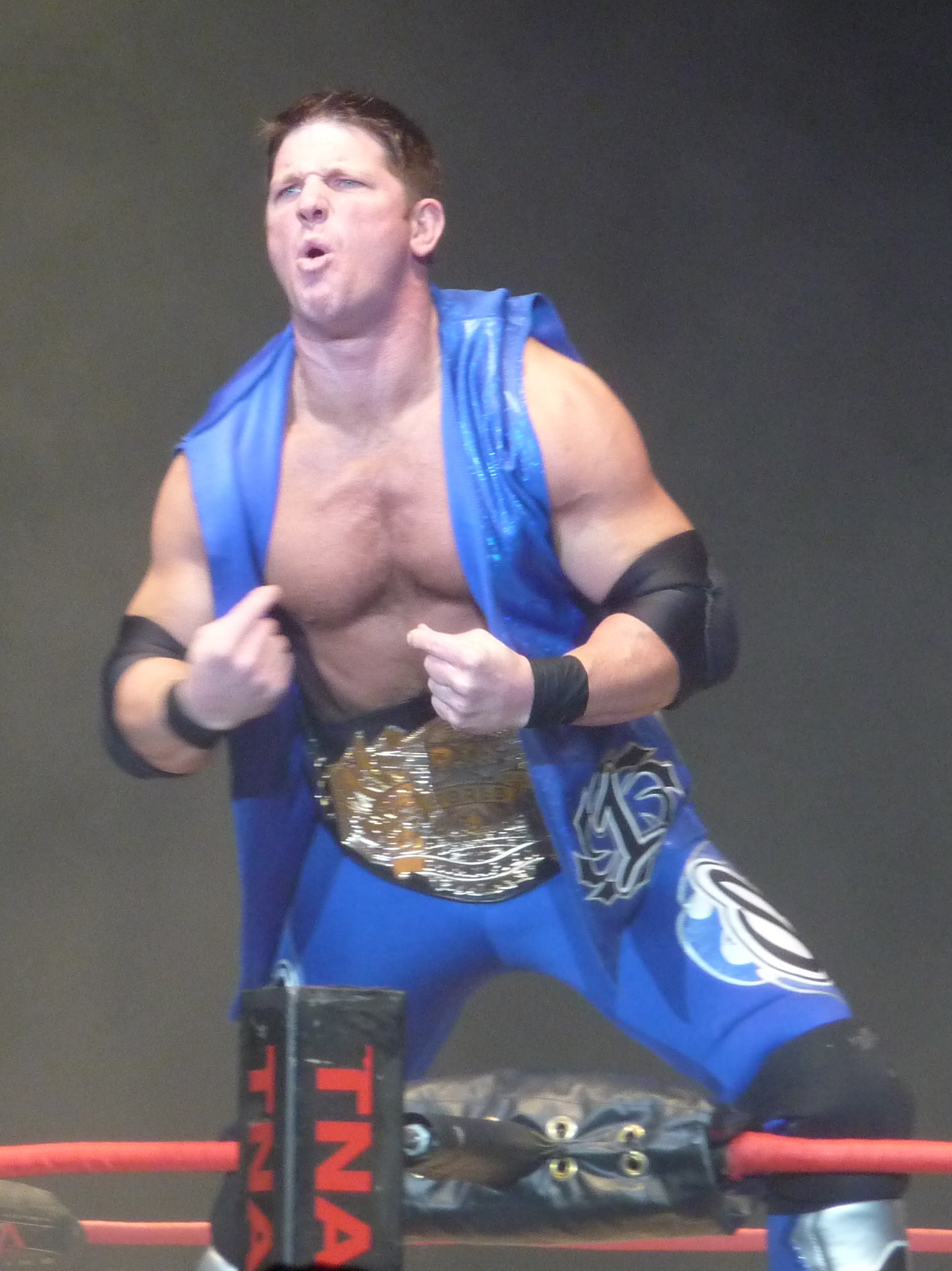
The TNA World Heavyweight Championship was vacated after reigning champion A.J. Styles "quit" TNA and a tournament was set up to crown the new champion.

Mr. Anderson and Bully Ray's friendship began to suffer when Anderson questioned Ray on adding Tito Ortiz into Aces & Eights without even discussing the matter with Anderson and Ray said that Anderson better not be sensitive and care about his business at Hardcore Justice. On the September 5 episode of Impact Wrestling, Anderson quit Aces & Eights by costing Ray, a no disqualification match against Sting. Ray defeated Anderson in a last man standing match to retain the TNA World Heavyweight Championship at No Surrender. After the match, Ray delivered a piledriver to Anderson on the entrance ramp, putting him out of action. Anderson returned to TNA on the October 24 episode of Impact Wrestling by rescuing A.J. Styles from an assault by Bully Ray. Dixie Carter got Anderson arrested. However, later that night, Anderson showed up during the World Heavyweight Championship match between Styles and Ray, during which he attacked Ray, costing him the title shot and then assaulted Ray after the match. Anderson then declared his intention to end Aces & Eights and gain revenge on Ray. On the November 7 episode of Impact Wrestling, Anderson demanded a match against Ray to be a no disqualification match at Turning Point, which Ray accepted and then Aces & Eights attacked Anderson. A stipulation was added into the match that if Anderson won then Aces & Eights would be forced to disband and if Ray won then Anderson must leave TNA.

At Bound for Glory, A.J. Styles defeated Bully Ray to win the World Heavyweight Championship. After retaining the title against Ray in a rematch on the October 24 episode of Impact Wrestling, Styles refused to sign Dixie Carter's new contract and opted to leave TNA with the title belt. The following week, on Impact Wrestling, Carter announced that she did not recognize Styles as her champion and a new eight-man tournament would take place to crown a new champion with Bobby Roode, James Storm, Kurt Angle, Chris Sabin, Samoa Joe, Jeff Hardy and Austin Aries announced as participants in the tournament, with the eighth man being determined via a gauntlet match later in the night, which Magnus won. Carter announced that all of the matches would have special stipulations that would be determined by her spinwheel called "Wheel of Dixie". Hardy defeated Sabin in a Full Metal Mayhem match on the November 7 Impact Wrestling and Angle defeated Aries in a submission match on the November 14 Impact Wrestling in the first round matches of the championship tournament. On the November 14 episode of Impact Wrestling, it was determined via the Wheel of Dixie that Roode and Storm would compete in a Bullrope match and Magnus and Joe would compete in a Falls Count Anywhere match in the World Heavyweight Championship tournament at Turning Point.

== Event ==
=== Preliminary matches ===
The first match of Turning Point was a Falls Count Anywhere match between Magnus and Samoa Joe in the first round of the tournament for the vacant TNA World Heavyweight Championship. After fighting back and forth throughout the backstage area and then through the ringside, Joe tried to charge onto Magnus on a chair but Magnus ducked and Joe ran face-first into the chair, getting knocked out and allowing Magnus to pin him for the victory.

Next, Gail Kim took on Candice LeRae. Kim executed an Eat Defeat on LeRae for the win.

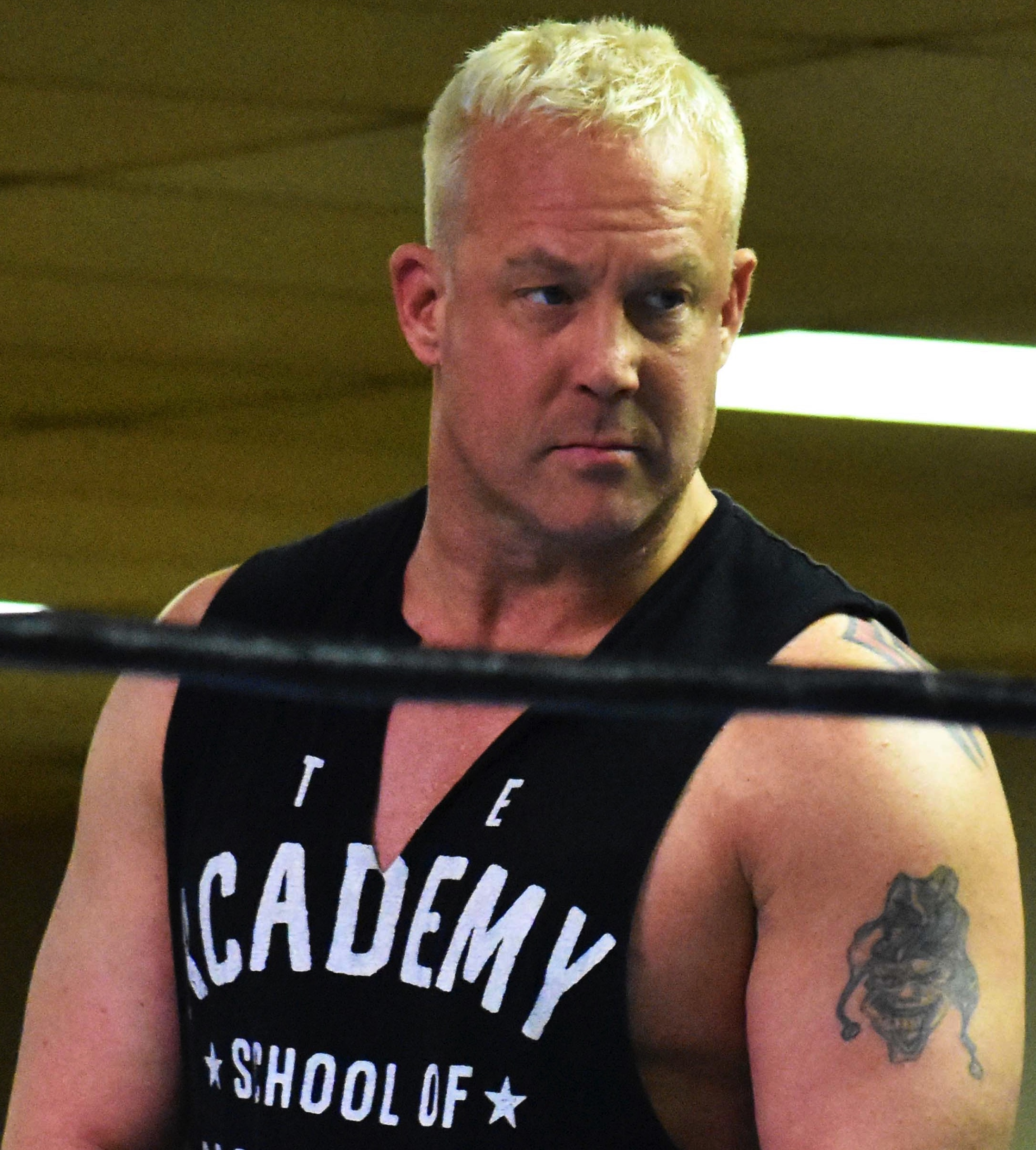
Mr. Anderson defeated Bully Ray in the main event to secure his job in TNA and permanently end Aces & Eights.

Next, James Storm took on Bobby Roode in the final match of the first round of the World Heavyweight Championship tournament. The match was originally scheduled to be a bullrope match but Storm requested Dixie Carter to change the match to a Florida Death match. Near the end of the match, Roode hit Storm with various weapons and was about to assault him with a barbed wire until Storm's partner Gunner threw in the towel for Storm, thus awarding the win to Roode.

After the match, a video package aired promoting the re-debut of former Gut Check contestant Sam Shaw, where he was interviewed by Christy Hemme at his house and he demanded that he be called Samuel Shaw from then onwards.

In the penultimate match, Shark Boy took on Ethan Carter III. EC3 nailed a One Percenter to Shark Boy for the win.

=== Main event match ===
The main event was a No Disqualification match between Mr. Anderson and Bully Ray, which stipulated that if Anderson won, then Ray's group Aces & Eights must disband and if Ray won then Anderson must leave TNA. Near the end of the match, Brooke tried to toss a hammer into the ring for Ray but Anderson caught the hammer and hit Ray with it and then delivered a Mic Check for the win, thus saving his career and forcing Aces & Eights to disband.

== Aftermath ==
The World Heavyweight Championship tournament continued after Turning Point as Magnus defeated Kurt Angle in a last man standing match and Jeff Hardy defeated Bobby Roode in a tables match in the semifinals on the December 5 episode of Impact Wrestling. At Final Resolution, Magnus defeated Jeff Hardy in a Dixieland match to win the tournament and his first World Heavyweight Championship, and thus turning into a villainous character by joining Dixie Carter's alliance.

On the November 28 episode of Impact Wrestling, Mr. Anderson held a funeral for Aces & Eights faction. The feud between Anderson and Bully Ray would continue after Ray attacked Anderson during his entrance during the Feast or Fired match and executed a piledriver on Anderson on the stage. The two continued their feud as Ray defeated Anderson in a no disqualification match at Genesis.

Dissension began between James Storm and Gunner as Storm confronted Gunner on throwing in the towel for Storm during his match against Bobby Roode, which led to Storm's loss. On the December 12 episode of Impact Wrestling, Storm and Gunner competed in a Feast or Fired match, where Gunner prevented Storm from retrieving the briefcase and retrieved it himself, which was revealed to contain a future TNA World Heavyweight Championship opportunity. This led to Gunner defending his briefcase against Storm on the December 26 episode of Impact Wrestling, which ended in a double count-out. The two would then compete in a Briefcase on a Pole match at Genesis, where Gunner retained the contract.

Samuel Shaw made his in-ring debut as a member of the TNA roster on the January 2, 2014 episode of Impact Wrestling, where he defeated Norv Fernum in his first match.

== Results ==
No.	Results	Stipulations	Times
1	Magnus defeated Samoa Joe	TNA World Heavyweight Championship Tournament: Round 1 Falls Count Anywhere match	11:25
2	Gail Kim (with Lei'D Tapa) defeated Candice LeRae	Singles match	1:55
3	Bobby Roode defeated James Storm	TNA World Heavyweight Championship Tournament: Round 1 Florida Death match	12:40
4	Ethan Carter III defeated Shark Boy	Singles match	2:10
5	Mr. Anderson defeated Bully Ray (with Brooke)	No Disqualification match Since Mr. Anderson won, Aces & Eights were forced to disband. Had Bully Ray won, Mr. Anderson would have been forced to leave TNA.	13:05

=== Tournament brackets ===
The tournament brackets for the vacant World Heavyweight Championship are:

Quarterfinals
Impact Wrestling	Jeff Hardy	Pin^{1}
11/7	Chris Sabin	10:39
Turning Point	Bobby Roode	TKO*^{2}
11/23	James Storm	12:36
Impact Wrestling	Kurt Angle	Sub^{3}
11/14	Austin Aries	18:46
Turning Point	Samoa Joe	Pin^{4}
11/23	Magnus	11:22

Semifinals
Impact Wrestling	Jeff Hardy	Win^{5}
12/5	Bobby Roode	13:51
Impact Wrestling	Kurt Angle	KO^{6}
12/5	Magnus	15:24

Finals
Final Resolution	Jeff Hardy	17:42
12/19	Magnus	Win^{7}

== See also ==
- 2013 in professional wrestling
- List of Impact! special episodes
