= Bound for Glory Series =

Annual professional wrestling tournament

The Bound for Glory Series is an annual professional wrestling tournament held by Impact Wrestling in which 12 wrestlers compete in a series of matches over the course of several months (throughout the summer specifically) to determine who receives a match for the Impact World Championship at Bound for Glory, which is Impact Wrestling's premier yearly PPV event. In 2016 TNA announced the Bound for Glory Playoffs which took place in a tournament format instead of the original round robin format.

Points are earned in a variety of ways and can be won in a variety of match types. Ten points were awarded for a submission victory, seven points were awarded for a pinfall victory, five points were awarded for a countout victory, three points were awarded for a disqualification victory, two points were awarded for a draw, and ten points were deducted for a disqualification loss. Special matches can also be made where the winner of the match can be awarded up to 25 points.

== Results ==
=== 2011 ===
On the June 16, 2011, edition of Impact Wrestling, TNA announced a twelve-man tournament to determine the number one contender for the TNA World Heavyweight Championship at October's Bound for Glory. The twelve men faced each other in matches on pay-per-view, television and at untelevised house show events and were given points based on their performance, with a submission victory giving a wrestler 10 points, a pinfall victory 7, a countout victory 5, a disqualification victory 3 and a draw 2 points, while a disqualification loss will cost a wrestler 10 points. A special ladder match on the July 21 edition of Impact Wrestling also gave out 10 points for the winner. The top four wrestlers faced each other in the tournament finals at September's No Surrender, where Bully Ray defeated James Storm via disqualification, while Bobby Roode defeated Gunner via submission, giving both 52 points and setting up a tiebreaker match between the two. In the tiebreaker match, Roode defeated Ray via pinfall to win the tournament.

==== Final standings ====
These wrestlers qualified for the final matches.
These wrestlers withdrew from the tournament.
Winner of the tournament.

Rank	Wrestler	Points	Matches
1	Bobby Roode	59	16
2	Bully Ray	52	16
3	Gunner	42	20
4	James Storm	40	13
5	Rob Van Dam	35	13
6	A.J. Styles	24	11
7	Scott Steiner	21	10
8	Samoa Joe	-10	10
DNF	Crimson	50	10^{2}
DNF	Devon	30	15^{2}
DNF	Matt Morgan	24	5^{1}
DNF	D'Angelo Dinero	17	17^{2}

^{1} Morgan was forced to pull out of the tournament on the July 28 edition of Impact Wrestling, after tearing his pectoral muscle.
^{2} Devon, Dinero and Crimson pulled out of the tournament after suffering storyline injuries at the hands of Samoa Joe on the August 18 and 25 editions of Impact Wrestling.

=== 2012 ===
On the June 14, 2012, episode of Impact Wrestling, TNA started the second Bound for Glory Series to determine the number one contender for the TNA World Heavyweight Championship at October's Bound for Glory. Just like the previous year, the tournament included twelve men, who would be facing each other in matches on pay-per-view, television and at untelevised house show events and would be given points based on their performance, with a submission victory giving a wrestler 10 points, a pinfall victory 7, a countout victory 5, a disqualification victory 3 and a draw 2 points, while a disqualification loss will cost a wrestler 10 points. An opening gauntlet match on the June 14 episode of Impact Wrestling gave out 20 points to the winner. Similarly, two four-way matches and a three-way match contested between the participants at Hardcore Justice gave 20 points to the three winners, as well as a one off match for regular scoring between Robbie E, Rob Van Dam and AJ Styles as they were unable to wrestle Dinero due to his injury Originally, all matches in the tournament had a ten-minute time limit, but on June 28 the limit was raised to fifteen minutes. However, on the August 16 episode of Impact Wrestling, the time limit was ignored without explanation for a match between A.J. Styles and Christopher Daniels, which lasted 16 minutes and 50 seconds. Unlike the previous year, in the 2012 tournament wrestlers faced each other only once in singles matches (not counting special multi-wrestler matches). As Mr. Anderson challenged for the TNA World Heavyweight Championship instead of taking part in the opening gauntlet match, he finished the tournament with one match fewer than the other competitors. The round-robin portion of the tournament concluded on September 6, while the finals took place on September 9 at No Surrender.

==== Final standings ====
These wrestlers qualified for the final matches.
These wrestlers withdrew from the tournament.
Winner of the tournament.

Rank	Wrestler	Points	Matches
1	James Storm	73	13
2	Samoa Joe	68	13
3	Bully Ray	62	13
4	Jeff Hardy	59	13
5	Rob Van Dam	55	13
6	A.J. Styles	50	13
7	Kurt Angle	48	13
8	Mr. Anderson	47	12
9	Christopher Daniels	33	13
10	Magnus	28	13
11	Robbie E	12	13
DNF	D'Angelo Dinero	7	9^{1}

^{1} Dinero was forced to pull out of the tournament on August 12, after suffering a shoulder injury.

Semifinals
1	James Storm	Pin
3	Bully Ray	13:54
2	Samoa Joe	Pin
4	Jeff Hardy	12:34

Final
3	Bully Ray	Pin
4	Jeff Hardy	12:23

=== 2013 ===
On the June 6, 2013, edition of Impact Wrestling, TNA announced a twelve-man round-robin tournament to determine the number one contender for the TNA World Heavyweight Championship at October's Bound for Glory. The twelve men faced each other in matches on pay-per-view, television and at untelevised house show events and were given points based on their performance, with a submission victory giving a wrestler 10 points, a pinfall victory 7, a countout victory 5, a disqualification victory 3 and a draw 2 points, while a disqualification loss will cost a wrestler 10 points. The time limit increased to 15 minutes. The top four in the standings advanced to a one night mini-tournament at Impact Wrestling: No Surrender on September 12 in St. Louis, Missouri that determined the ultimate winner.

==== Qualifying matches ====
- Slammiversary XI, June 2
  - Jay Bradley defeated Sam Shaw in the Gut Check Tournament finals.
- Impact Wrestling, June 6
  - Hernandez defeated Chavo Guerrero
  - Samoa Joe defeated Robbie E
- Impact Wrestling, June 13
  - Joseph Park defeated Crimson
  - Magnus defeated Matt Morgan, Rob Terry, and Kenny King
  - Bad Influence (Christopher Daniels and Kazarian) defeated James Storm and Gunner
  - Austin Aries defeated Eric Young
  - Mr. Anderson won a battle royal which also included Devon, D.O.C., Knux, Wes Brisco, and Garett Bischoff
  - A.J. Styles defeated Kurt Angle
  - Bobby Roode and Jeff Hardy received byes due to being past BFG Series winners

On the July 11 episode of Impact Wrestling (taped June 30), the 12 BFG Series competitors were entered in a series of "Joker's Wild" tag team matches where the wrestlers were paired up at random. The winners of the tag team matches then advanced to a six-man Gauntlet for the Gold match where the winner received 25 points. That match was won by Magnus. Both the tag team matches and gauntlet (for those who advanced) are included in the number of matches each competitor had.

On August 15 as part of Impact Wrestling: Hardcore Justice there were three special four-way matches - a ladder match, a table match, and a street fight - each worth 20 points (won by Kazarian, Bobby Roode, and Joseph Park respectively). The street fight was aired on the August 22 broadcast.

On the August 29 episode of Impact Wrestling TNA GM Hulk Hogan announced that all 12 BFG Series participants would compete in a final Gauntlet for the Gold match (which aired on September 5) for 20 points. The top point scorer then had his choice of opponent from the rest of the top four for the tournament semi-finals at Impact Wrestling: No Surrender. The match was won by A.J. Styles. Styles then chose Austin Aries as his semifinal opponent, leaving Bobby Roode vs Magnus as the other semifinal match.

On September 12, 2013 as part of Impact Wrestling: No Surrender, A.J. Styles defeated Austin Aries in the first semi-final match, while Magnus defeated Bobby Roode in the other semi-final. In the main event of the broadcast, Styles defeated Magnus by pinfall after hitting him with the Spiral Tap to win the 2013 BFG Series.

==== Final standings ====
These wrestlers qualified for the final matches.
Winner of the tournament

Rank	Wrestler	Points	Matches
1	A.J. Styles	63	9
2	Magnus	46	7
3	Austin Aries	35	8
4	Bobby Roode	34	9
5	Jeff Hardy	31	8
6	Christopher Daniels	30	8
7	Kazarian	29	9
8	Samoa Joe	26	9
9	Mr. Anderson	24	9
10	Joseph Park	17	8
11	Hernandez	7	8
11	Jay Bradley	7	8

Semifinals
1	A.J. Styles	Pin
3	Austin Aries	14:37
2	Magnus	Pin
4	Bobby Roode	6:55

Final
1	A.J. Styles	Pin
2	Magnus	15:08

=== 2016 ===
On July 8, TNA's announced that Impact Wrestling will begin airing at 8pm EST on Thursday nights on July 21, it was also revealed that July 21 episode will feature the start of the "Bound for Glory Playoff" to determine a new #1 contender to the TNA World Heavyweight Championship at Bound for Glory.

Quarterfinals
James Storm	09:29
Matt Hardy	Pin
Ethan Carter III	Pin
Eli Drake	07:55
Drew Galloway	Pin
Bram	06:58
Jeff Hardy	02:10
Mike Bennett	Pin

Semifinals
Matt Hardy	07:28
Ethan Carter III	Pin
Drew Galloway	07:48
Mike Bennett	Pin

Final
Ethan Carter III	Pin
Mike Bennett	17:23

== Bound for Glory Series/Playoff winner's championship matches ==
	Winner	Bound for Glory	Year	Result
1	Bobby Roode	Bound for Glory (2011)	2011	Kurt Angle defeated Roode to retain the TNA World Heavyweight Championship
2	Jeff Hardy	Bound for Glory (2012)	2012	Hardy defeated Austin Aries to win the TNA World Heavyweight Championship
3	A.J. Styles	Bound for Glory (2013)	2013	Styles defeated Bully Ray to win the TNA World Heavyweight Championship
4	Ethan Carter III	Bound for Glory (2016)	2016	Lashley defeated Carter to retain the TNA World Heavyweight Championship

== Participant List ==
Wrestler	Victories	Appearances
AJ Styles	1	3
Bobby Roode	1	2
Jeff Hardy	1	2
Samoa Joe	0	3
Bully Ray	0	2
Christopher Daniels	0	2
D'Angelo Dinero	0	2
James Storm	0	2
Magnus	0	2
Mr. Anderson	0	2
Rob Van Dam	0	2
Austin Aries	0	1
Crimson	0	1
Devon	0	1
Gunner	0	1
Hernandez	0	1
Jay Bradley	0	1
Joseph Park	0	1
Kazarian	0	1
Kurt Angle	0	1
Matt Morgan	0	1
Robbie E	0	1
Scott Steiner	0	1
