= Dixie Carter (wrestling) =

Professional wrestling promoter and businesswoman (born 1964)

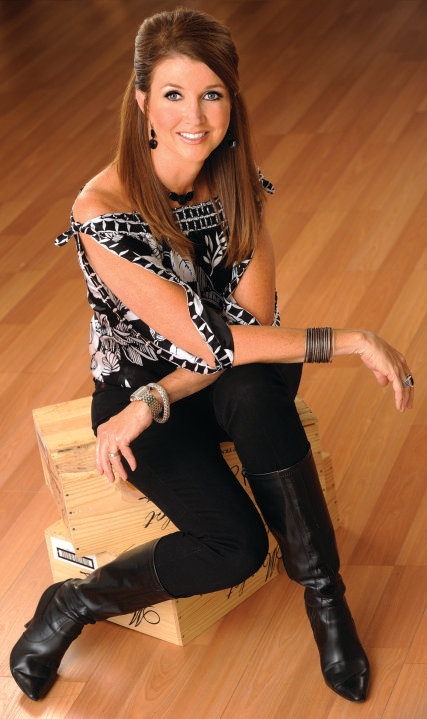
- Carter in 2011
- Born: October 6, 1964 (age 62); Dallas, Texas, U.S.
- Education: University of Mississippi
- Years active: 1993–present

Dixie Carter-Salinas (born October 6, 1964) is an American businesswoman and current president of Panda Biotech. She is best known for her time as president of the professional wrestling promotion Total Nonstop Action Wrestling (TNA).

Carter was in a backstage role during her early time with the company, though began to appear on TNA programming from 2009, and became an on-screen storyline character in 2010. In 2012, Carter purchased the majority share of TNA from Panda Energy International, making her the majority owner. In 2016, Billy Corgan succeeded Carter as president, with Carter becoming chairwoman of the promotion. Following a restructuring period, Anthem Sports & Entertainment purchased the majority of the promotion from Carter. The promotion was subsequently renamed Impact Wrestling in 2017, and Carter would remain a minority owner until she left.

== Early life ==
Carter was born in Dallas, Texas to parents Robert W. and Janice Carter (died 2025). She graduated from The Hockaday School in 1982 and subsequently attended the University of Mississippi, graduating in 1986 with a Bachelor of Business Administration. While a student, Carter was active on the Student Programming Board, and was a member of the Kappa Kappa Gamma women's fraternity. In addition, Carter worked as an intern with Levenson and Hill, a marketing and advertisement firm in the Las Colinas suburb of Dallas, Texas. Upon graduating, Carter became a full-time employee of Levenson and Hill, receiving a promotion to the position of vice president at the age of 32. In 1993, she started her own business in Nashville, focusing primarily on sport and music representation.

== Business career ==
=== Total Nonstop Action Wrestling (2002–2017) ===
In 2002, the president of Monterey Peninsula Talent (a booking agency) contacted Carter and informed her that Total Nonstop Action Wrestling, a professional wrestling promotion, required a marketing and publicity outlet. Carter began working with TNA, but, two months later, was informed by Jeff Jarrett (a part-owner of TNA) that a key financial backer (HealthSouth Corporation, which was having financial problems due to its being investigated for accounting irregularities) had withdrawn support from TNA, and that the company was in dire straits as a result. Carter, claiming to "[See] the potential in a marketplace that had one company WWE with a US$900 million market cap and no competitor", contacted her parents, the owners of Panda Energy International, a Dallas-based energy company. In October 2002, Panda Energy purchased 71% of TNA from the HealthSouth Corporation for $250,000. On October 31, 2002, TNA (which originally traded as "J Sports and Entertainment") was renamed "TNA Entertainment". Carter was appointed president of TNA Entertainment in spring 2003. In December 2007, Carter voluntarily appeared before United States Congress to be interviewed regarding professional wrestling in the wake of the Chris Benoit double murder and suicide.

Carter served as the president of TNA until August 12, 2016, when she became the new chairwoman of the promotion, with Billy Corgan taking over the presidency. Soon after, however, Corgan sued the company and Carter, as he said he was lied to about when he would get his money back. On November 30, it was reported that Corgan had settled his lawsuit against TNA, with Anthem Sports & Entertainment Corp. acquiring the loans Corgan made to Carter in the process. In late November 2016, it was reported that, once Corgan's lawsuit was settled, TNA would go through a restructuring period that would see ownership change, with Anthem taking 85%, Aroluxe 10%, and Dixie Carter retaining 5%, making Carter the minority owner and leaving her with no decision-making power in TNA going forward. On January 4, 2017, Anthem Sports and Entertainment purchased 85% majority stake of TNA Wrestling and Carter resigned as chairwoman after fourteen years in charge. Ed Nordholm of Anthem took over as president. Carter joined the Advisory Board of Fight Media Group, the division of Anthem that deals with the combat sports-related assets of the company where she would focus on the global growth of the brands in that division, while also remaining as a minority shareholder of the company until she left in the same year.

== Professional wrestling career ==
=== Total Nonstop Action Wrestling ===
==== Sporadic appearances (2009–2012) ====
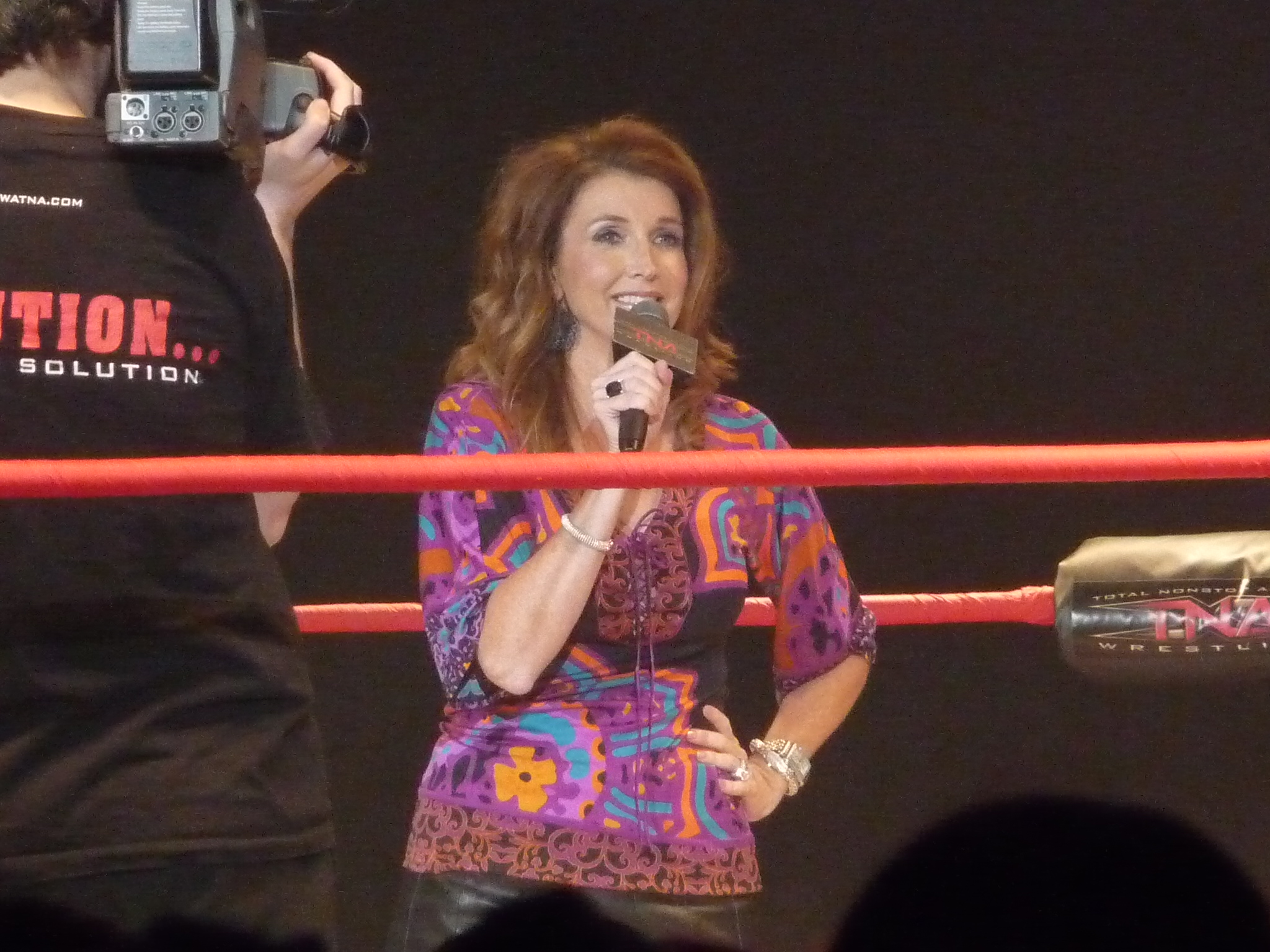
Carter speaks to the crowd in 2010

After making only occasional appearances on pay-per-views, Carter made her first appearance on TNA Impact! on August 27, 2009, interviewing new signee Bobby Lashley.

In early 2010, after the debuts of Hulk Hogan and Eric Bischoff, Carter became a regular authority figure on Impact!, before losing her on-screen power to the two of them, on the October 14, 2010, edition of Impact!. However, Carter would make another appearance on the November 25, 2010, edition of Reaction when, in storyline, she informed Hogan and Bischoff that a judge filed an injunction against the two on behalf of Carter over not having signatory authority.

On the March 3, 2011, edition of Impact!, the result of the court battle between Carter and Hogan was revealed, with Hogan declaring himself as the new head of TNA Wrestling. Carter returned to TNA on October 16 at Bound for Glory, when Sting defeated Hogan to bring her back to power. Carter made an appearance on the December 8 edition of Impact Wrestling, along with Sting to confront TNA World Heavyweight Champion, Bobby Roode. The segment ended with Roode spitting in Carter's face.

In the summer of 2012, Carter was also the focal point in a storyline where Kazarian and Christopher Daniels accused her of having an affair with company TNA mainstay A.J. Styles. The duo provided compromising footage of Carter and Styles entering a hotel together as well as photographs of them embracing. Carter's real-life husband Serg Salinas made a televised appearance on Impact Wrestling where he knocked Styles to the ground. It was ultimately revealed that Carter and Styles were merely helping a mutual friend, Claire Lynch, work through drug addiction issues.

==== Dixieland (2013–2014) ====
Carter appeared at the ending segment of Impact Wrestling on September 19, 2013, to (in character) confront AJ Styles over the remarks he has made about the way she was running the company. Carter responded by saying that Styles was not a great wrestler and claimed that she was the one who created the Styles' persona to get marketing for the company. She added that Styles would still be living in poverty if her father didn't pay him, and she was the one who created this house (TNA). She was about to leave when Styles was going to respond, she decided to end the show by cutting off the microphones and turning off the lights, thus turning into a villainess in the process. On the following episode of Impact Wrestling, Carter ripped up AJ Styles' new contract as awarded by Hulk Hogan, then gave Hogan an ultimatum to join forces with her by next week. Hogan declined her offer and quit, Carter initially begged him to reconsider, but then claimed Hogan could not quit because she had fired him, though Hogan had already walked off camera by this point. At Bound For Glory, the evil Dixie interfered in the main event and ordered referee Earl Hebner not to count Styles' pin; however, Styles would ultimately defeat Bully Ray to become the TNA World Heavyweight Champion. Next week, she tried to convince Styles to sign a new contract with TNA, but Styles refused, leaving the company with the title. On October 29, 2013, Carter vacated Styles's title. However, Styles announced a title defense in Asistencia, Asesoría y Administración promotion (otherwise known as Lucha Libre AAA Worldwide) . When Dorian Roldán, AAA owner, announced Judas Mesias as AJ's rival, Carter said that she talked with Roldán attempting to cancel the match. Meanwhile, she announced a tournament to crown a new TNA Champion, as she refused to recognize Styles' reign. Magnus eventually won the tournament and the championship at Impact Wrestling: Final Resolution by defeating Jeff Hardy in the eponymous Dixieland match, with the help of Rockstar Spud and Dixie's storyline nephew Ethan Carter III. They formed "Team Dixie" in the process.

On January 9, 2014, Magnus defeated AJ Styles upon his return to TNA, unifying the titles. Styles left TNA after the match. On January 30, 2014, Montel Vontavious Porter debuted in TNA as an investor and entered into a feud with Carter. At Lockdown 2014, Dixie Carter's team of Bobby Roode, Austin Aries, and the BroMans (Robbie E and Jessie Godderz) lost to MVP's team of himself, The Wolves, and Willow in a Lethal Lockdown match after interference from the special referee, Bully Ray, who was initially intended to be the "insurance" for Dixie's team. As a result of her team's defeat, MVP took control of TNA as the (storyline) Director of Wrestling Operations. Following the events of Lockdown, Dixie feuded with Bully Ray, who promised that he would put her through a table. On the June 27 tapings of Impact that aired on August 7, Carter was put through a table by Bully Ray.

==== Various appearances (2015–2016) ====
At the June 26, 2015 tapings for the July 8 episode of Impact Wrestling, Carter made her first televised appearance after a nearly year long absence. After her nephew, Ethan Carter III, finished his match with Kurt Angle, Carter admitted that she was on a power trip whose ego got the best of her, and that the company doesn't belong to her or her nephew, but to the fans and apologized for her actions for the past year and a half saying that she would not make those same mistakes again, this would turn Dixie into a babyface once again.

On the January 5 live debut of Impact Wrestling on Pop TV, Dixie opened the show feuding with Ethan Carter III and ended up leaving abruptly when Eric Young attacked Matt Hardy, who was confronting Carter.

== Personal life ==
Carter is married to Serg Salinas, former music producer for TNA with whom she has two children; a daughter Reese and a son Tanner. In November 2017, Carter appeared on Ant & Dec's DNA Journey as it was revealed that she is a distant cousin of British television host Declan Donnelly. She has also appeared on WWE's Kurt Angle: Homecoming episode of the WWE Network series WWE 24.

On March 24, 2025 it was announced that Carter's mother had died.

== Legacy ==
Carter has been criticized for her decisions about TNA. AJ Styles, once dubbed as "The Face of TNA", said that Carter ruined TNA because of her "not knowing what's best for business". Konnan claimed Carter is "incompetent" and "she doesn't know what she is doing". Vince Russo has also been critical of Carter's management style stating, "Dixie just did so much more damage than good, just not being upfront and not being honest and everything was underhanded and behind people's back. I can't tell you how many times as my boss, she would tell me something and then it always ended with, 'but you can't say anything, you can't tell anybody' and that was just so hard to work under that umbrella".

Kurt Angle praised Carter as a "great boss", stating, "Sometimes, having a woman in charge is a lot better than a man, because they're so much more understanding, more compassionate". Hernandez praised Carter as "smart" for delegating responsibilities to others with more knowledge of the professional wrestling business. Eric Bischoff also praised Carter as an "intelligent woman" who could sell her product to corporate executives but criticized her for not having an overall vision for the company. Meanwhile, Bruce Prichard described Carter as "very gullible", and criticized the corporate structure within TNA.

Various women who performed for the Knockouts division criticized Carter. Awesome Kong has stated that she felt that Carter "didn't appreciate her homegrown talent" and that Knockouts were underpaid, with some having to work second jobs. Velvet Sky said that Carter "ruined it for all of us". Sky also stated that Spike TV canceled Impact Wrestling after they got tired "of Carter's shit". Angelina Love, Velvet Sky's tag team partner, said that working with her was "a disaster". Tara ended on bad terms with TNA, complaining that the company was disorganized under Carter's leadership.

== Awards and accomplishments ==
- Women Superstars Uncensored
  - WSU Hall of Fame (Class of 2012)
- WrestleCrap
  - Gooker Award (2013) – Heel turn angle
