= No Surrender (2013) =

- Promotional poster featuring the TNA World Heavyweight Champion Bully Ray and Mr. Anderson
- Promotion: Total Nonstop Action Wrestling
- Date: September 12, 2013
- City: St. Louis, Missouri
- Venue: Chaifetz Arena
- Attendance: 2,000
- Tagline: "12 Men. One Shot at Glory"

No Surrender chronology
← Previous; 2012	Next → 2014

Impact Wrestling special episodes chronology
← Previous; Hardcore Justice	Next → Turning Point

The 2013 No Surrender (also known as Impact Wrestling: No Surrender) was a professional wrestling television special and the ninth No Surrender event produced by Total Nonstop Action Wrestling (TNA). It took place on September 12, 2013 at the Chaifetz Arena in St. Louis, Missouri. Unlike the previous events, this event was not held on pay-per-view (PPV) and instead, like Destination X and Hardcore Justice, was featured as a special edition of TNA's weekly broadcast of Impact Wrestling.

Five matches were contested at the event including a pre-show match. The event concluded the 2013 Bound for Glory Series, as A.J. Styles defeated Magnus in the tournament final to earn himself a TNA World Heavyweight Championship match at Bound for Glory. Also at the event, Bully Ray successfully defended the World Heavyweight Championship against Mr. Anderson in a Last Man Standing match.

== Production ==
=== Background ===
In 2013, TNA announced that it was discontinuing most of the pay-per-views and would run pay-per-view events on quarterly basis a year and instead introduced the pre-taped One Night Only pay-per-view events. No Surrender was also dropped as a pay-per-view event and instead resumed as a special episode of TNA's flagship television program Impact Wrestling.

=== Storylines ===
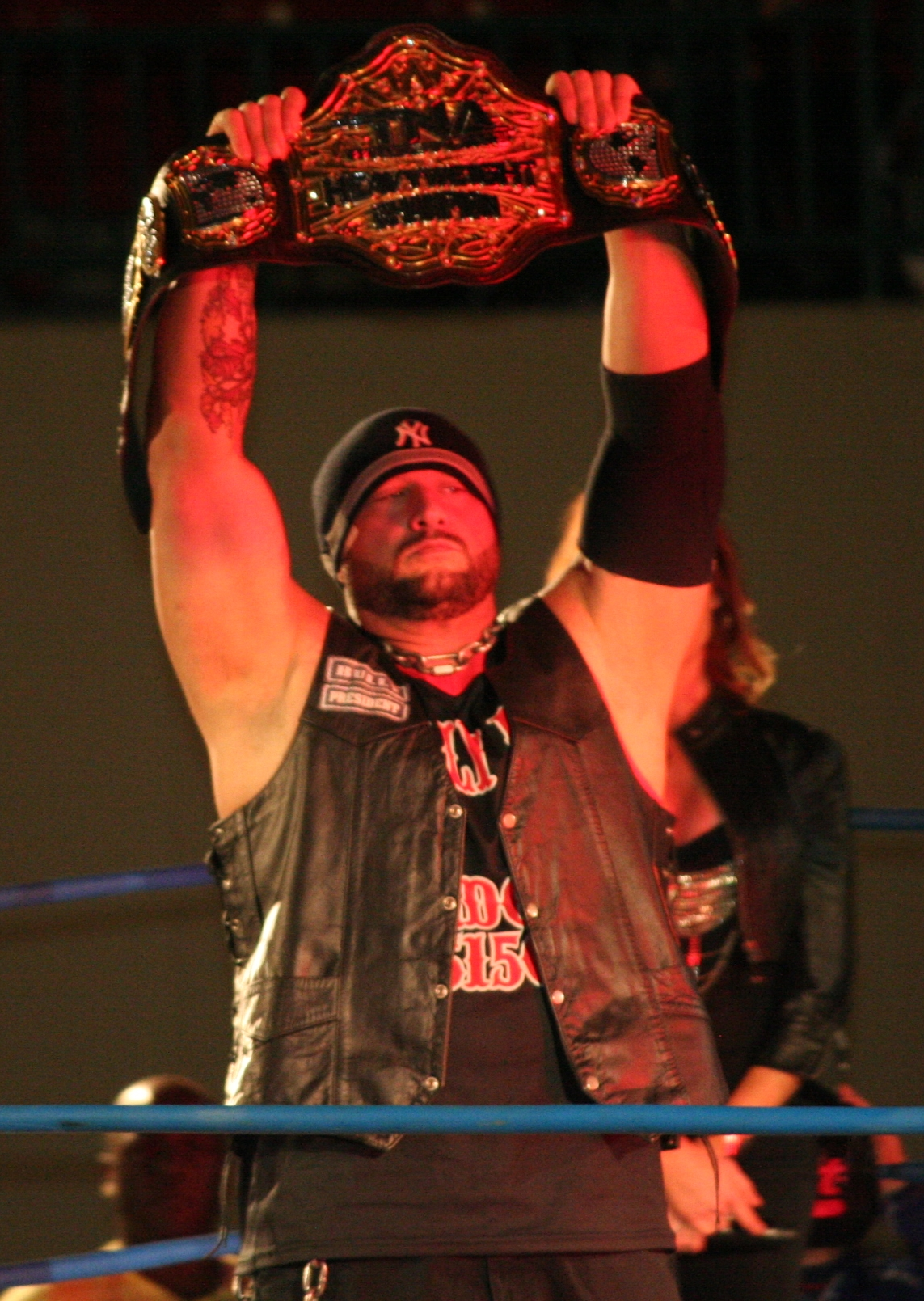
Bully Ray defended the TNA World Heavyweight Championship against Mr. Anderson in a Last Man Standing match at No Surrender.

No Surrender featured professional wrestling matches that involved different wrestlers from pre-existing scripted feuds and storylines. Wrestlers portray villains, heroes, or less distinguishable characters in the scripted events that build tension and culminate in a wrestling match or series of matches.

The show was centered around the 2013 Bound for Glory Series. On the August 29 episode of Impact Wrestling, TNA General Manager Hulk Hogan announced that the knockout stage of the BFG Series would take place at No Surrender on September 12 and announced that a gauntlet match would take place on the September 5 Impact Wrestling, where all the 12 participants of the BFG Series would participate and the winner would gain 20 points in the series. A.J. Styles won the gauntlet and became the leader in the BFG Series points with Magnus, Austin Aries and Bobby Roode being ranked next to Styles in the rankings respectively, thus determining the Final Four of the BFG Series who would qualify for the knockout stage at No Surrender. Styles was given the opportunity to choose his semi-final opponent due to being points leader and he chose Aries as his opponent due to him losing Aries earlier in the tournament, thus setting up Styles versus Aries and Roode versus Magnus in the semifinals at No Surrender.

At Hardcore Justice, Tito Ortiz revealed himself to be the newest member of Aces & Eights by turning on Rampage Jackson by hitting him with a hammer, which distracted Chris Sabin enough for Aces & Eights leader Bully Ray to defeat him in a steel cage match to win the TNA World Heavyweight Championship. The Aces & Eights Vice President Mr. Anderson took exception to Ortiz' inclusion into the group and said that Ray had to discuss with the group and vote before adding Ortiz into the group but Ray said that Anderson better not be sensitive and take care of his own business. Ray then revealed that the only "Brooke" that matter in his life was Brooke Tessmacher and not Hulk Hogan's daughter Brooke Hogan, whom he had used to reach to the top and win the World Heavyweight Championship. On the August 29 episode of Impact Wrestling, Hulk Hogan announced that Ray would defend the title against a member of Aces & Eights at No Surrender. On the September 5 episode of Impact Wrestling, Anderson revealed himself to be that Aces & Eights member by costing Ray, a no disqualification match against Sting by tossing the hammer away from Ray while Sting had applied a Scorpion Deathlock on Ray. At No Surrender, Hogan added a stipulation to the title match that it would be a last man standing match.

== Event ==
=== Pre-show ===
During a taping for the September 18 episode of Xplosion prior to the start of the event, Kazarian defeated Chris Sabin by reversing a sunset flip attempt into a roll-up and pinned Sabin by using the ropes for leverage.

=== Preliminary matches ===
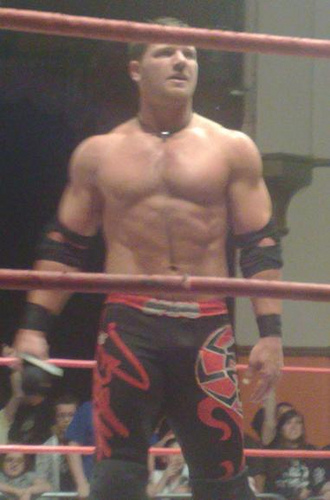
A.J. Styles won the Bound for Glory Series to become the #1 contender for the TNA World Heavyweight Championship at Bound for Glory.

During the first 2013 Bound for Glory Series semi-final match, A.J. Styles competed against Austin Aries. Styles performed a Styles Clash from the middle rope onto the mat on Aries for the win.

The second semi-final match featured Magnus against Bobby Roode. Magnus was able to pin Roode with a jackknife to advance to the final round against A.J. Styles.

The penultimate match was a Last Man Standing match, in which Bully Ray defended the TNA World Heavyweight Championship against Mr. Anderson. The referee was knocked out during the match as Anderson had delivered a Mic Check to Ray, which allowed Aces & Eights to interfere on Ray's behalf by attacking Anderson and delivering a triple powerbomb to Anderson and Brooke Tessmacher delivering a low blow to Anderson. Anderson got up before the ten count and then Ray speared Anderson through a table to keep Anderson down for the 10 count to retain the title. After the match, Ray performed a piledriver to Anderson on the entrance ramp.

=== Main event match ===
The main event was the final round match of the 2013 Bound for Glory Series between A.J. Styles and Magnus. Extraordinary Gentlemen's Organization (Bobby Roode, Christopher Daniels and Kazarian) interfered in the match to attack both participants in the early moments of the match. Near the end of the match, Magnus nailed a spinebuster to Styles but Styles countered with a series of forearm smashes and nailed a Spiral Tap to Magnus to win the match and win the 2013 Bound for Glory Series. After the match, Styles cut a pipe bomb, in which he criticized TNA management particularly Dixie Carter, calling her out for the next week's episode of Impact Wrestling.

== Reception ==
Graham Matthews of Next Era Wrestling praised No Surrender by writing "Once again, TNA hit a home run with their latest made-for-TV event that featured several well wrestled matches and logical booking. I was very glad that the show was fully focused on the Bound For Glory Series matches as well as the drama within Aces and Eights instead of killing time with filler matchups. Sure, there was one throwaway segment with two tag teams, but that didn't at all take away from the enjoyment of this event. Now that the stage is set for Bound For Glory, I look forward to the road that TNA takes to the pending pay-per-view and watching the card come together."

Jonathan Sullivan of 411Mania considered No Surrender to be the "Best Impact of the year thus far and the best “free PPV” they have put on.". He praised Styles' performances in both of his matches and considered the BFG Series final match between Styles and Magnus to be "a great and dramatic end" to the tournament. He further wrote "Ray and Anderson may not have been great in terms of wrestling, but the story they told was tremendous and it was easily the match of the night. Magnus/Roode was okay but the noticeable weak point wrestling-wise"

James Caldwell of Pro Wrestling Torch considered No Surrender to be "One of the better Impact episodes" of 2013, with "The three high-stakes BFG Series Final Four matches delivered, the TNA Title match was a very good brawl, and TNA got out of the way (for the most part) to let the wrestlers tell their stories."

== Aftermath ==
On the September 19 episode of Impact Wrestling, A.J. Styles criticized Dixie Carter on the way in which she ran TNA and the company made so many mistakes throughout the past eleven years since its inception in 2002, criticizing her for firing the X Division stars like Jerry Lynn, Low Ki, Petey Williams, Jay Lethal and Alex Shelley in favor of mixed martial artists and other sports celebrities, which led to Carter turning into a villainous character saying that she created the "Phenomenal One" character for Styles and Styles would have still be living in poverty if he had not been paid by Carter's father while Styles also revealed that he did not have a contract with TNA. The feud between Styles and Carter continued as Carter tore up a new TNA contract which Hulk Hogan offered to Styles. Carter gave an ultimatum to Hogan to either side with her or leave and Hogan chose to quit TNA. Styles would then begin feuding with Bully Ray over winning the Bound for Glory Series, defeating Ray to win the World Heavyweight Championship at Bound for Glory.

After losing to Bully Ray and being piledriven on stage at No Surrender, Mr. Anderson was out of action for over a month before making his return to TNA on the post-Bound for Glory episode on the October 24 episode of Impact Wrestling, when he rescued A.J. Styles from an assault by Bully Ray, thus resuming his feud with Ray. This set up a no disqualification match between Anderson and Ray at Turning Point, where if Anderson won then Aces & Eights must disband and if Ray won then Anderson must leave TNA.

== Results ==
No.	Results	Stipulations	Times
1^{X}	Kazarian defeated Chris Sabin (with Velvet Sky)	Singles match	5:59
2	A.J. Styles defeated Austin Aries	2013 Bound for Glory Series semi-final	14:37
3	Magnus defeated Bobby Roode	2013 Bound for Glory Series semi-final	6:55
4	Bully Ray (c) defeated Mr. Anderson	Last Man Standing match for the TNA World Heavyweight Championship	17:27
5	A.J. Styles defeated Magnus	2013 Bound for Glory Series final	15:08
(c) / – the champion(s) heading into the match; X / – the match was taped for a future broadcast of Xplosion

== See also ==
- 2013 in professional wrestling
- List of Impact! special episodes
