= BroMans =

Professional wrestling tag team

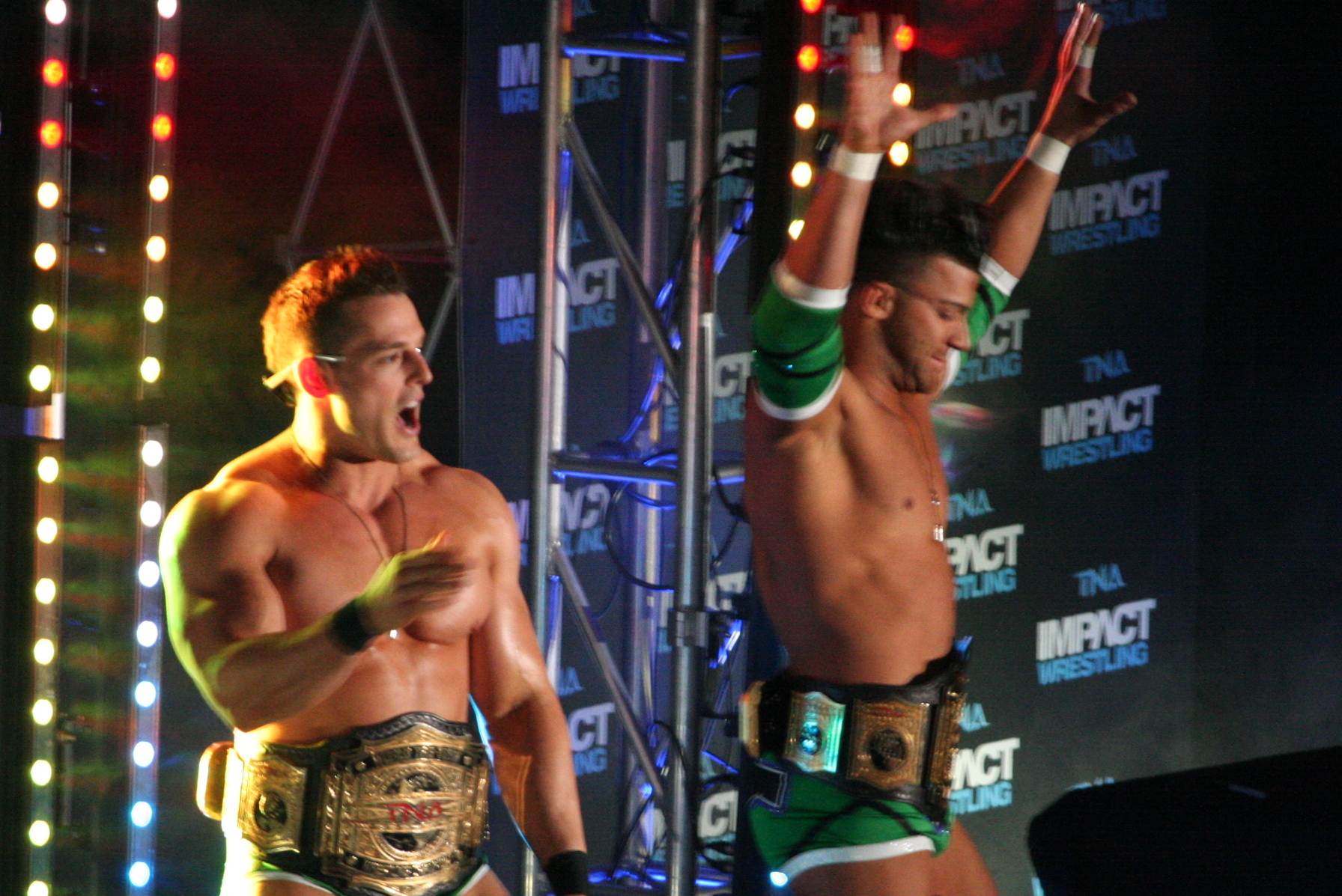
- Godderz (left) and Robbie (right) as the TNA World Tag Team Champions

Stable
- Name: The BroMans
- Members: Robbie E Jessie Godderz; Zema Ion / DJZ; Angelina Love; Raquel (valet)
- Billed heights: Robbie: 5 ft 11 in (1.80 m); Godderz: 5 ft 10 in (1.78 m); DJZ: 5 ft 8 in (1.73 m)
- Combined billed weight: 422 lb (191 kg)
- Debut: May 2, 2013
- Disbanded: October 13, 2016
- Years active: 2013–2015; 2016

The BroMans were an American professional wrestling stable in Total Nonstop Action Wrestling (TNA), which consist of Jessie Godderz, Robbie E, and DJZ. They are two-time TNA World Tag Team Champions.

== History ==
=== Total Nonstop Action Wrestling ===
==== Formation (2013) ====
Robbie E started allying himself with Jessie Godderz on the May 2 episode of Impact Wrestling, where they teamed with Joey Ryan in a handicap match against Rob Terry, which the team lost after Jessie and Robbie walked out on Ryan and left him to be pinned. On the June 27 episode of Impact Wrestling, Jessie and Robbie, accompanied by Tara, confronted TNA World Tag Team Champions Gunner and James Storm and presented themselves as The BroMans. The following week, The BroMans were defeated by Gunner and Storm in a non-title match. On the August 8 episode of Impact Wrestling, The BroMans (Jessie Godderz and Robbie E) and Mickie James were defeated by Gunner, Storm and ODB in a six-person mixed tag team match. On the September 26, episode of Impact Wrestling The BroMans and Gail Kim were defeated by Eric Young, ODB and Joseph Park in a six-person mixed tag team match. On the October 17, 2013, edition of Impact Wrestling, Robbie E defeated Hernandez, Christopher Daniels and Eric Young in a four corners match to get the advantage of the last entry in the Bound for Glory tag team gauntlet match.

==== TNA World Tag Team Champions (2013–2014) ====
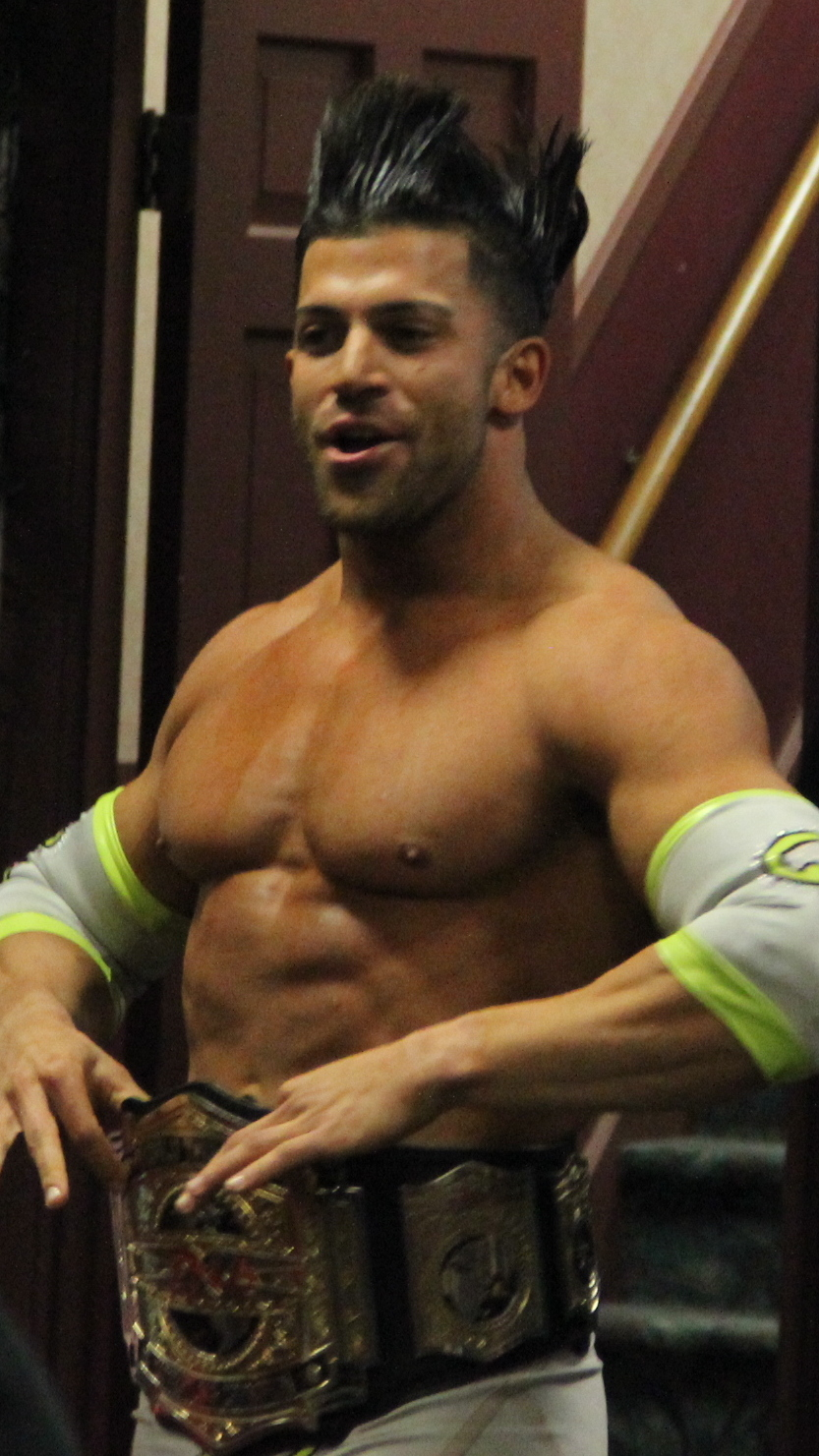
Robbie E as the TNA World Tag Team Champion in December 2013

On the Countdown to Bound for Glory Pre-show, The BroMans with "Mr. Olympia" Phil Heath, defeated Chavo Guerrero and Hernandez, Bad Influence (Christopher Daniels and Kazarian) and Eric Young and Joseph Park to earn a TNA World Tag Team Championship match on the Pay-per view, The BroMans defeated Gunner and Storm to win the TNA World Tag Team Championship. The BroMans made their first televised title defense on the October 31 episode of Impact Wrestling, defeating Gunner and Storm in a rematch. On the November 22, 2013, Thanksgiving edition of Impact Wrestling, The BroMans won the first ever tag team turkey bowl match defeating Dewey Barnes and Norv Fernum, in the process forcing them to wear the annual turkey suits, the same night Zema Ion made his return to TNA, joining the BroMans as their personal DJ (then his ring name changed to "DJZ"). On the December 12 episode of Impact Wrestling, DJZ took part in a Feast or Fired match, winning one of the four briefcases. The following week on December 19 during Final Resolution, DJZ's briefcase was revealed to contain an X Division Championship match. On the December 26 episode of Impact Wrestling, The BroMans teamed with Ethan Carter III and Rockstar Spud in a handicap match defeating Sting and Jeff Hardy. On February 23, 2014, The BroMans lost the TNA World Tag Team titles to The Wolves during a TNA House Show. They regained the titles by defeating The Wolves and Wrestle-1 team Team 246 (Kaz Hayashi and Shuji Kondo) at the TNA/Wrestle-1 Kaisen: Outbreak supershow in Tokyo, Japan on March 2. On March 9, 2014, at Lockdown, Team MVP (MVP, (Davey Richards and Eddie Edwards and Willow) defeated Team Dixie (Bobby Roode, Austin Aries and The BroMans (Robbie E and Jessie Godderz). On April 27, 2014, at Sacrifice, The Wolves defeated The BroMans in a No Disqualification 3-on-2 Handicap match to win the TNA World Tag Team Championship. The BroMans would fail to capture the titles in a rematch against The Wolves during a Ladder match.

==== Various feuds and downfall (2014–2015) ====
On June 15, 2014, at Slammiversary XII, The BroMans (Godderz and DJZ) defeated Marshall and Ross Von Erich of the Von Erich family by disqualification who were being accompanied by father, Kevin Von Erich. On the July 3, episode of Impact Wrestling, Godderz and DJZ unsuccessfully challenged The Wolves in a three way tag team match for the TNA World Tag Team Championship that also included The Menagerie (Knux and The Freak). In August 2014, The BroMans began allying themselves with The Beautiful People (Angelina Love and Velvet Sky). On the September 10, episode of Impact Wrestling The BroMans teamed with Velvet Sky defeating The Menagerie (Knux, Crazzy Steve and Rebel). On October 22, 2014, The BroMans (Godderz and DJZ) entered a number one contenders tournament for the TNA World Tag Team Championships losing to The Hardys (Jeff Hardy and Matt Hardy) in the first round of the tournament. On November 1, 2014, The BroMans (Robbie E and Jessie Godderz) along with DJZ were defeated by Team 246 (Kaz Hayashi and Shuji Kondo) with Minoru Tanaka during the Wrestle-1's Keiji Mutoh 30th Anniversary show. On January 23, 2015 episode of Impact Wrestling, The BroMans competed in the Feast or Fired match, during the match Velvet Sky assisted Robbie E by grabbing a feast or fired brief case but during the brief case reveal Robbie turned this around on Sky claiming that she should open the case since she was the one who originally retrieved it. Sky opened the brief case containing the pink slip.

On April 17, 2015 episode of Impact Wrestling, after losing a tag match to the Dirty Heels, Robbie E and Godderz got into a brawl, and Godderz left The BroMans. On May 15, Robbie E would defeat Godderz in a match, Godderz would announce a rematch the same night. Robbie E would defeat Godderz yet again, Godderz challenged Robbie E to another match. Robbie E would defeat Godderz yet again with roll-up after the match Godderz nails Robbie with the microphone after that Godderz pulls out a chair and wraps it around Robbie's neck and slams it into the ring post. On June 17 episode of Impact Wrestling, Godderz would defeat DJZ via submission, Robbie E would come out after the match and attack Godderz. On June 28, 2015 at Slammiversary XIII, Robbie E defeated Godderz.

==== Reunion (2016) ====
On the March 22, 2016 episode of Impact Wrestling, Godderz and Robbie E (minus DJZ) reunited as fan favorites to face Beer Money for the TNA World Tag Team Championship, but were unsuccessful in winning the titles. They once again challenged Beer Money to a match, which also involved Eric Young and Bram and Decay, in a losing effort. On the May 31 episode of Impact Wrestling, they defeated Rockstar Spud and Tyrus, to become the number one contenders for the TNA World Tag Team Championship, facing Decay at Slammiversary in a losing effort.

In October, following Bound for Glory, the team quietly disbanded when Godderz went in a feud with Aron Rex for the Impact Grand Championship, and Robbie started comical segments with Grado in an attempt to introduce him in the BroMans.

=== Pro Wrestling Noah (2017) ===
In April 2017, Robbie E and Bram took part in Japanese promotion Pro Wrestling Noah's 2017 Global Tag League billed as "New BroMans."

== Championships and accomplishments ==
- Total Nonstop Action Wrestling
  - TNA World Tag Team Championship (2 times) – Robbie E and Godderz
  - TNA Turkey Bowl (2013) – Robbie E and Godderz
  - TNA World Cup (2016) – Robbie E and Godderz with Jeff Hardy, Eddie Edwards and Jade
  - Feast or Fired (2013 – TNA X Division Championship) – DJZ
