= Hardcore Justice (2013) =

2013 Total Nonstop Action Wrestling pay-per-view event

- Promotion: Total Nonstop Action Wrestling
- Date: August 15, 2013 (aired August 15, 2013; August 22, 2013)
- City: Norfolk, Virginia
- Venue: Constant Center
- Attendance: 3,200
- Tagline: "It's not always about winning - it's about surviving"

Hardcore Justice chronology
← Previous; 2012	Next → 2014

Impact Wrestling special episodes chronology
← Previous; Destination X	Next → No Surrender

The 2013 Hardcore Justice (also known as Impact Wrestling: Hardcore Justice) was the ninth edition of Hardcore Justice professional wrestling event produced by Total Nonstop Action Wrestling (TNA), which took place on August 15, 2013 and aired on the August 15 and August 22 broadcasts of TNA's weekly flagship program Impact Wrestling. Unlike the previous events, this event was not held on pay-per-view (PPV) and instead, like Destination X, was featured as a special edition of TNA's weekly broadcast of Impact Wrestling.

The August 15 episode featured four matches including two 2013 Bound for Glory Series matches and a steel cage match between Chris Sabin and Bully Ray for the World Heavyweight Championship, which Ray won. The August 22 episode was headlined by a five-on-five loser leaves TNA match between The Main Event Mafia (Sting, Samoa Joe, Magnus, Rampage Jackson) and A.J. Styles and Aces & Eights (Wes Brisco, Garett Bischoff, Devon, Mr. Anderson and Knux), which Mafia won when Styles pinned Devon, forcing Devon to quit TNA.

== Production ==
=== Background ===
In 2013, TNA discontinued the monthly pay-per-views and began running pay-per-views on quarterly basis a year in favor of the new pre-recorded One Night Only events. Hardcore Justice was dropped as a pay-per-view and instead resumed as a special episode of TNA's flagship television program Impact Wrestling.

=== Storylines ===
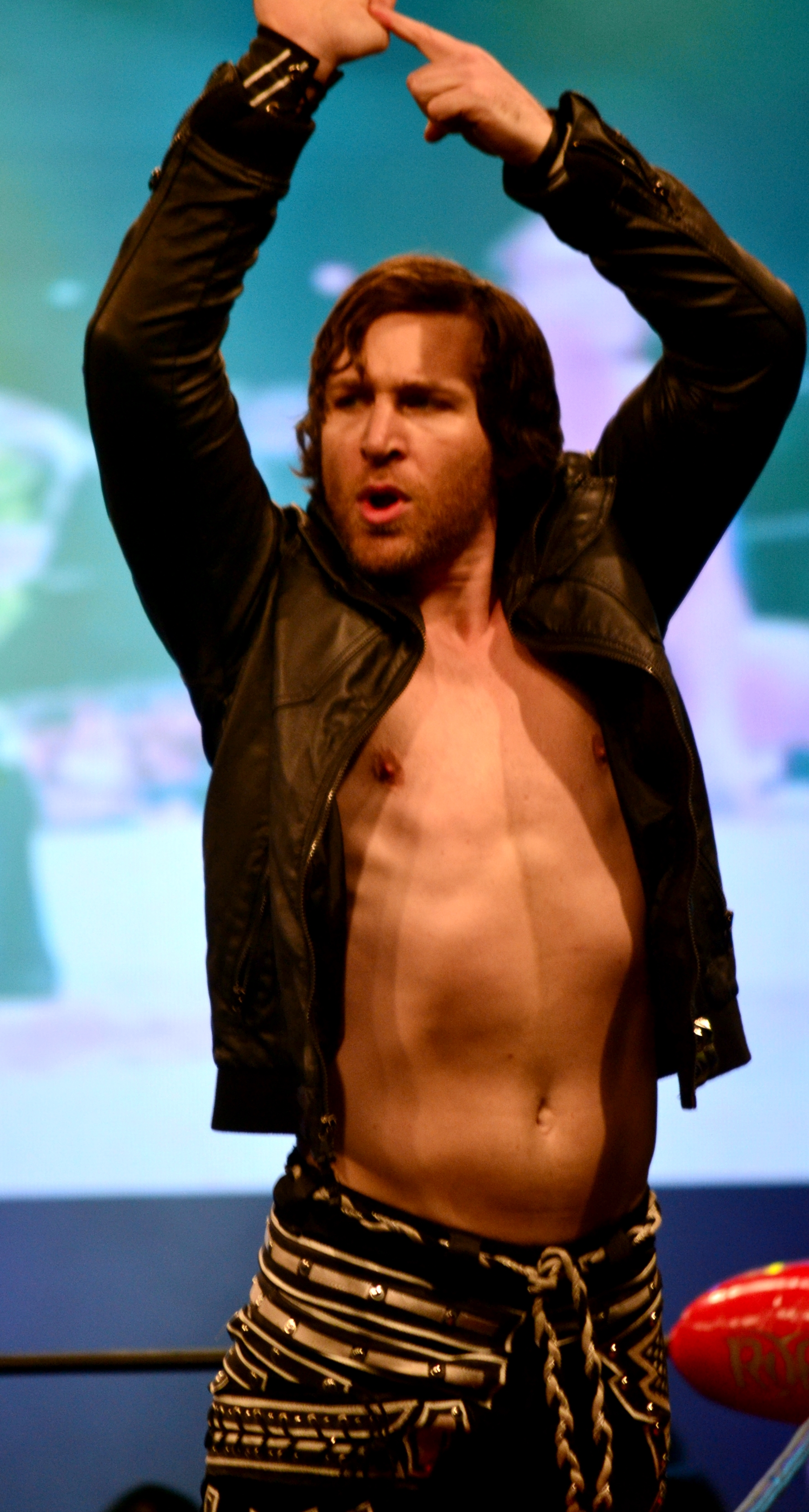
Chris Sabin was the defending TNA World Heavyweight Champion heading into Hardcore Justice.

At Destination X, Chris Sabin defeated Bully Ray to win the World Heavyweight Championship by invoking Option C clause which stated that Sabin had to vacate his X Division Championship in trade for a World Heavyweight Championship match. The following week, on Impact Wrestling, Ray threatened to sue Sabin and TNA for using the hammer on him to win the title and demanded that Sabin returned the title which Sabin refused and then the TNA General Manager Hulk Hogan tore down Ray's lawsuit and announced that Sabin would defend the title against Ray in a steel cage match at the Hardcore Justice special episode of Impact Wrestling on August 15, in which neither Aces & Eights nor The Main Event Mafia would be allowed to interfere.

At Slammiversary XI, Bully Ray successfully defended the World Heavyweight Championship against Sting in a No Holds Barred match, with the assistance of his faction Aces & Eights. The match stipulated that Sting would not receive a title shot at the title again. On the June 13 episode of Impact Wrestling, Sting announced that he was bringing back Main Event Mafia to battle Aces & Eights, with Kurt Angle, Samoa Joe, Magnus and Rampage Jackson being announced as the members in the upcoming weeks. At Destination X, Main Event Mafia countered Aces & Eights' interference in the World Heavyweight Championship match between Bully Ray and Chris Sabin, which led to Sabin winning the title. On the August 1 episode of Impact Wrestling, Angle proposed a match to Aces & Eights, which would be a five-on-five loser leaves TNA match between the Mafia and Aces & Eights at Hardcore Justice, where the losing member would be forced to leave TNA, which Aces & Eights accepted. Angle was later removed from the match due to legitimately being admitted to rehab for drug and alcohol use.

On the August 8 episode of Impact Wrestling, it was announced that A.J. Styles, Austin Aries, Jeff Hardy and Kazarian would compete in a ladder match to gain 20 points in the Bound for Glory Series. A similar tables match was announced later on for the August 15 edition of Hardcore Justice in which Bobby Roode, Magnus, Mr. Anderson and Samoa Joe would compete with the winner earning 20 points in the BFG Series. A similar street fight was announced for the August 22 edition of Hardcore Justice in which Christopher Daniels, Hernandez, Jay Bradley and Joseph Park would compete to gain 20 points in the BFG series.

On the June 27 episode of Impact Wrestling, Mickie James successfully defended the Knockouts Championship against Velvet Sky. On the July 25 episode of Impact Wrestling, James defeated Gail Kim to retain the title after Kim got in the face of the special guest referee ODB, which led to her defeat. Sky returned to TNA and sat ringside for the match. This led to a match between Kim and ODB the following week on Impact Wrestling, which ended in a double count-out after both women began brawling outside the ring. On the August 8 episode of Impact Wrestling, the team of James Storm, Gunner and ODB defeated James, Robbie E and Jessie Godderz in a six-person tag team match, after which Kim distracted ODB, allowing James to attack her from behind. It was later announced that James and Kim would face ODB and Sky in a tag team match at Hardcore Justice. A singles match was later made between ODB and Kim on the August 22 edition of Hardcore Justice.

== Event ==
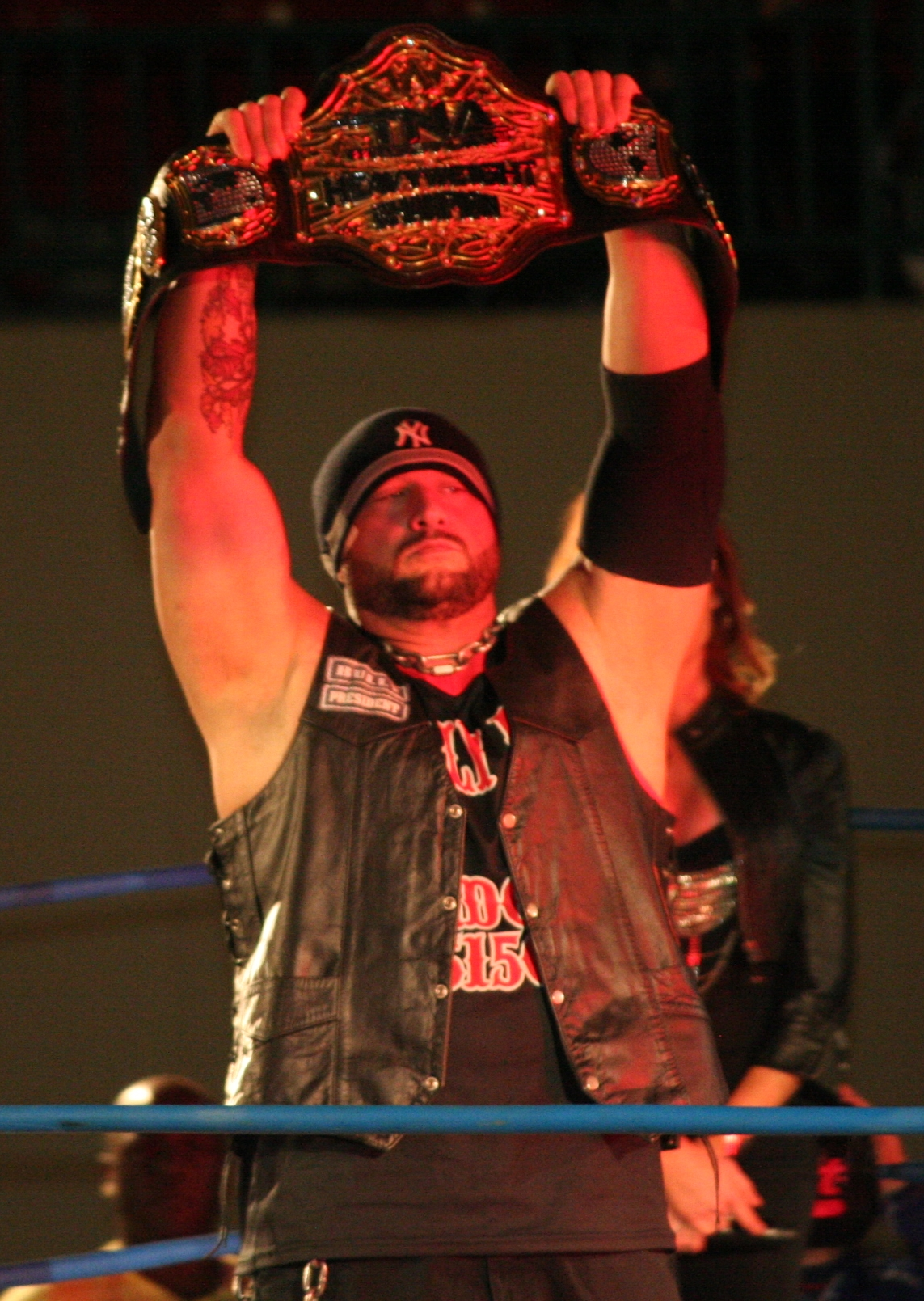
Bully Ray won the TNA World Heavyweight Championship during the night one of Hardcore Justice.

=== Night One ===
The August 15 Hardcore Justice special opened with a ladder match between A.J. Styles, Austin Aries, Jeff Hardy and Kazarian, with the winner getting 20 points in the Bound for Glory Series. Near the end of the match, as Hardy was about to climb a ladder for the win, Kazarian's allies Bobby Roode and Christopher Daniels interfered in the match on his behalf as Kazarian took an appletini from Daniels and threw it into Hardy's eyes to knock him out and climbed the ladder and retrieve the clipboard to win the match and earn 20 points in the BFG Series.

Next, a tag team match was scheduled to take place pitting ODB and Velvet Sky against Gail Kim and Mickie James, but the match was abruptly changed into a three-way hardcore match due to Sky's injury. ODB nailed a Bam! on Kim for the win.

The penultimate match was a tables match between Bobby Roode, Magnus, Mr. Anderson and Samoa Joe with the winner gaining twenty points in the BFG Series. Christopher Daniels and Kazarian interfered in the match on Roode's behalf, with Daniels throwing an appletini in Magnus' eyes and Roode powerbombed him through the table to win the match.

The main event was a steel cage match, in which Chris Sabin defended the World Heavyweight Championship against Bully Ray. Near the end of the match, the referee was accidentally knocked out by Sabin and Ray. Sabin nailed a missile dropkick on Ray and then tried to escape the cage but Mr. Anderson interfered and slammed the cage door on Sabin. Rampage Jackson and Tito Ortiz interfered to counter Anderson's interference and Jackson attacked Anderson, during which Ortiz turned on Jackson by hitting him with a hammer, which distracted Sabin enough for Ray to deliver him a Bully Bomb and win the title.

=== Night Two ===
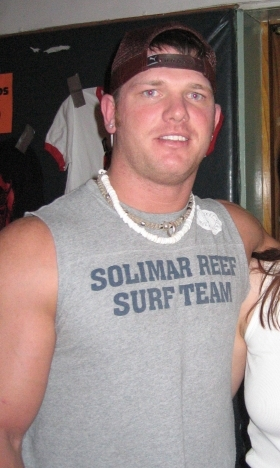
A.J. Styles was the surprise fifth partner of The Main Event Mafia on the night two of Hardcore Justice.

The August 22 edition of Hardcore Justice opened with Christopher Daniels, Bobby Roode and Kazarian announcing the formation of their new alliance called EGO and they invited Austin Aries to join the group but were interrupted by Gunner and James Storm, who confronted them, leading to a tag team match pitting Storm and Gunner against Roode and Kazarian. Storm was about to win the match by executing a Last Call on Roode but the referee got in the way, which allowed Roode to hit a low blow to Storm and roll him up for the win.

Next, Manik took on Sonjay Dutt. After a back and forth match, Manik executed a Death From Above on Dutt for the match.

Next, Christopher Daniels, Hernandez, Jay Bradley and Joseph Park competed in a street fight with the winner gaining 20 points in the Bound for Glory Series. Bobby Roode and Kazarian interfered in the match on Daniels' behalf until Austin Aries showed up apparently to be their ally but turned on them by hitting a brainbuster on Daniels and then brawled with Roode and Kazarian. Park then nailed a Black Hole Slam on Bradley for the win.

In the penultimate match, ODB took on Gail Kim. Kim took advantage of ODB's injured arm and pinned her with a crucifix for the win.

The main event was a five-on-five loser leaves TNA match between The Main Event Mafia (Sting, Samoa Joe, Magnus, Rampage Jackson) and a fifth partner against Aces & Eights (Wes Brisco, Garett Bischoff, Devon, Mr. Anderson and Knux). A.J. Styles revealed himself as the fifth partner of MEM, thus turning into a fan favorite and abandoning his "Lone Wolf" gimmick to revert to his "Phenomenal One" gimmick and entering to his old entrance theme. Styles nailed a Styles Clash on Devon for the win, resulting in Devon legitimately being eliminated from TNA.

== Aftermath ==
On the August 29 episode of Impact Wrestling, Mr. Anderson voiced his displeasure of Bully Ray not discussing with him before adding Tito Ortiz into Aces & Eights, to which Ray said that Anderson must not be sensitive and Ray could take care of the business on his own which caused dissension within Aces & Eights. Later that night, he revealed Brooke as his on-screen lover and revealed that he had used Hulk Hogan's daughter Brooke Hogan to win the TNA World Heavyweight Championship and Hogan responded by saying that Ray would be defending the title against an Aces & Eights member at No Surrender. The following week on Impact Wrestling, Anderson cost Ray, a no disqualification match against Sting by tossing the hammer away from Ray and revealed himself to be Ray's challenger for the World Heavyweight Championship in a last man standing match at No Surrender, thus leaving Aces & Eights.

ODB and Gail Kim continued their feud as the two competed in a two out of three falls match on the August 29 episode of Impact Wrestling, which ODB won to become the #1 contender for the Knockouts Championship, which she won by defeating Mickie James on the September 19 Impact Wrestling. This led to a three-way match between ODB, Kim and Brooke for the title at Bound for Glory.

The Bound for Glory Series continued after Hardcore Justice as it was announced that the semifinals and final round matches would take place at No Surrender, where A.J. Styles defeated Austin Aries in the first semi-final and Magnus defeated Bobby Roode in the second semi-final. Styles would defeat Magnus in the final to win the 2013 Bound for Glory Series and become the #1 contender for the World Heavyweight Championship at Bound for Glory.

== Results ==
August 15, 2013 – Impact Wrestling
No.	Results	Stipulations	Times
1	Kazarian defeated A.J. Styles, Austin Aries and Jeff Hardy	Ladder match for 20 points in the Bound for Glory Series	17:45
2	ODB defeated Gail Kim and Mickie James	Three-way hardcore match	06:50
3	Bobby Roode defeated Magnus, Mr. Anderson and Samoa Joe	Tables match for 20 points in the Bound for Glory Series	10:25
4	Bully Ray defeated Chris Sabin (c)	Steel Cage match for the TNA World Heavyweight Championship	18:30
(c) / – the champion(s) heading into the match

August 22, 2013 – Impact Wrestling
No.	Results	Stipulations	Times
1	Kazarian and Bobby Roode defeated Gunner and James Storm	Tag team match	09:50
2	Manik defeated Sonjay Dutt	Singles match	04:35
3	Joseph Park defeated Christopher Daniels, Jay Bradley and Hernandez	Street Fight for 20 points in the Bound for Glory Series	12:05
4	Gail Kim defeated ODB	Singles match	7:00
5	The Main Event Mafia (Sting, Samoa Joe, Magnus and Rampage Jackson) and A.J. Styles defeated Aces & Eights (Wes Brisco, Garett Bischoff, Devon, Mr. Anderson and Knux)	Five-on-Five tag team Loser Leaves TNA match	16:45

== See also ==
- List of Impact! special episodes
