= Bound for Glory (2013) =

2013 Total Nonstop Action Wrestling pay-per-view event

- Promotional poster featuring Jeff Hardy
- Promotion: Total Nonstop Action Wrestling
- Date: October 20, 2013
- City: San Diego, California
- Venue: Viejas Arena
- Attendance: 3,000

Pay-per-view chronology
← Previous; Slammiversary XI	Next → Lockdown

TNA Bound for Glory chronology
← Previous; 2012	Next → 2014

The 2013 Bound for Glory was a professional wrestling pay-per-view (PPV) event produced by Total Nonstop Action Wrestling (TNA). It took place on October 20, 2013 at Viejas Arena in San Diego, California. It was the ninth pay-per-view under the Bound for Glory chronology, and the fourth event in the 2013 TNA PPV schedule. The event also marked the first time TNA hosted an event in San Diego. One pre-show match from the event was also aired live on Spike which featured a #1 contendership gauntlet match for the TNA World Tag Team Championship.

In October 2017, with the launch of the Global Wrestling Network (now Impact Plus), the event became available to stream on demand.

== Production ==
=== Background ===
The ninth event in the Bound for Glory chronology was first announced on June 2, 2013 at the Slammiversary PPV to around the weekend where Kurt Angle would be formally inducted into the TNA Hall of Fame. In late May, the official press release for the event was sent out, in which TNA President, Dixie Carter, stated "I'm really looking forward to bringing our biggest Pay-Per-View event of the year to San Diego for the first TNA show ever in this great city", adding that "Since 2005, Bound for Glory has brought fans from across the world together to enjoy a jam-packed weekend of fun and intense competition, and I'm thrilled that we will have the sunny Southern California coast as our backdrop." Tickets for the event went on sale June 7, 2013.

In September, TNA announced their deal with Spike to air their 1-hour Countdown to Bound for Glory pre-show prior to the official PPV. Media attention for Bound for Glory was also garnered from an array of sources, including The Miami Herald, Direct TV and Marvel. As part of the yearly attraction, TNA put together the Bound for Glory VIP Weekend around the San Diego area, featuring various festivities such as the Fan InterAction that gives fans the opportunity to connect with their favorite stars, and the TNA Hall of Fame ceremony for Kurt Angle at the San Diego Marriott Mission Valley leading up to the day of the event. The event's theme song "Every Other Day" was created by Jeff Hardy's band Peroxwhy?gen, from their new album, Plurality Of Worlds, set to release on November 29. The second theme song is "Big Shot" by Islander.

=== Storylines ===
Other on-screen personnel
Commentator	Mike Tenay
Commentator	Taz
Ring announcers	Jeremy Borash
Ring announcers	Christy Hemme
Referee	Brian Stiffler
Referee	Earl Hebner
Referee	Brian Hebner
Interviewers	Jeremy Borash

Bound for Glory featured seven professional wrestling matches and one pre-show match that involved different wrestlers from pre-existing scripted feuds and storylines. Wrestlers portrayed villains, heroes, or less distinguishable characters in the scripted events that built tension and culminated in a wrestling match or series of matches.

The 2013 Bound for Glory Series tournament began on TNA's flagship television program, Impact Wrestling, on June 6, 2013. All 12 competitors were tasked with the objective to accumulate the most points by gaining victories on Impact Wrestling, live shows and TV specials in order to challenge for the TNA World Heavyweight Championship at Bound for Glory. It culminated with 4 remaining finalists on Impact Wrestling: No Surrender on September 12, 2013, where AJ Styles advanced over Magnus, Austin Aries and Bobby Roode to earn a shot at the world title in a match with the champion, Bully Ray. Over the next course of weeks, AJ Styles (admitting to not be contracted to the company but obligated to compete for the world title after winning the BFG Series) ranted on and swore revenge against TNA President, Dixie Carter. As a result, Dixie turned heel and became hellbent on taking him down by putting up a $50,000 bounty, which went unsuccessful. Carter later announced over social media that Styles' title bout against Ray would be No Disqualifications.

On September 12, 2013, the TNA X Division Champion, Manik, wrestled against Jeff Hardy. The same night, TNA Triple Crown winner Chris Sabin turned heel when he felt Manik didn't show proper respect to him for his accomplishments. He additionally insulted fellow Triple Crown winner Austin Aries. On September 26, 2013, Manik defeated Sabin in a title match, but after the defense, Sabin attacked Manik until Aries came to save him. On the October 3 edition of Impact Wrestling, Jeff Hardy and Manik defeated Kenny King and Chris Sabin in a tag team match. Afterwards, Sabin attacked Hardy and Manik. Aries, who was on commentary, attacked Sabin and eventually challenged Hardy, Sabin and Manik to an Ultimate X match for the TNA X-Division Championship. On the October 10 episode of Impact Wrestling, Samoa Joe announced his entry into the match, making him the fifth participant.

At No Surrender, Roode was defeated by Magnus in the semi-finals of their Bound for Glory Series match. The same night, Roode and his stable, The Extraordinary Gentleman's Organization (EGO) interfered in the finals, attacking Magnus and AJ Styles. The next week, EGO attacked Magnus. On the October 3, 2013 edition of Impact Wrestling, Magnus faced EGO in a 3-on-1 Gauntlet match, prevailing over Christopher Daniels and Kazarian but lost to Roode, giving EGO the victory. Afterwards, Sting attempted to console Magnus, who was expressing his frustrations of losing the Bound For Glory Series. Magnus accused Sting of not understanding his frustrations due to accomplishing so much in his career. Sting responded by challenging Magnus at Bound For Glory.

On the October 10 edition of Impact Wrestling, Daniels and Kazarian announced Bobby Roode's induction into the "EGO Hall of Fame", which led to a Roode diatribe about how he should have been selected for the actual TNA Hall of Fame instead of Kurt Angle. Angle then returned after an extended hiatus, fought off all three members of EGO and challenged Roode to a match at Bound For Glory. The following week, Angle stated his discontentment with Roode mocking his Hall of Fame induction and told Roode he would make him tap out. Roode responded by attacking Angle with help from his faction, EGO, forcing Angle to submit to the crossface hold in a precursory act prior to their match.

On the October 3 edition of Impact Wrestling, Velvet Sky and Brooke were supposed to have a number one contenders match, however Lei'D Tapa made her debut and attacked Sky. The following week, on the October 10 edition of Impact Wrestling, Brooke defeated Sky to win a spot in the three-way match for the TNA Knockouts Championship against Gail Kim and champion ODB at Bound For Glory.

TNA announced a four-way tag team gauntlet match between Chavo Guerrero and Hernandez, Bad Influence (Christopher Daniels and Kazarian), Eric Young and Joseph Park and The BroMans (Robbie E and Jessie Godderz) taking place on the preshow to Bound for Glory. The winners are set to face TNA World Tag Team Champions Gunner and James Storm at the PPV. On the October 17th edition of Impact Wrestling, Robbie E defeated Hernandez, Christopher Daniels and Eric Young in a four-way match to get the advantage of the last position (4th). This meant that they entered the match last.

== Aftermath ==
TNA President, Dixie Carter, announced a rematch for the TNA World Heavyweight Championship after the event. On the October 24, 2013 Impact Wrestling episode, Styles defeated Ray to retain the World Title. After the match, Carter, who had opposed Styles, had a change of heart and offered a new, lucrative contract to Styles; however, Styles refused to accept the contract due to his spite for Carter and left the company with the title. Carter vacated the title and began a World Title Tournament the following week, although Styles proceeded without authorization to defend the title belt in various international promotions.

=== Reception ===
Mike Johnson, from PWInsider, said that the main event was "Really good, hard hitting, well told story here. Easily the best thing on the show and a really good main event." However, he criticized the Magnus-Sting due to "The idea here was to make Magnus by having Sting lose clean in a back and forth contest. On paper, it made sense but the match didn't feel like it had the spark needed for that sort of moment". Also, described Ethan's debut as "pitch-perfect". He described the entire show as "It was just a show - some good, some eh, but Bound for Glory should never be just a show, it's their Wrestlemania, except this year, it wasn't." Pat McNeill, from PWTorch, said Bound for Glory "Wasn't a great event". Bob Kapur, from CANOE Slam, said that he enjoyed the event overall. Also, Matthew Asher, from CANOE too, enjoyed the PPV but said the ultimate success of this Bound for Glory rests on the future storylines this event sets up.

== Results ==
No.	Results	Stipulations	Times
1^{P}	The BroMans (Jessie Godderz and Robbie E) (with Phil Heath) won by last eliminating Eric Young and Joseph Park	Gauntlet match to determine #1 contenders to the TNA World Tag Team Championship	22:14
2	Chris Sabin (with Velvet Sky) defeated Manik (c), Austin Aries, Jeff Hardy and Samoa Joe	Ultimate X match for the TNA X Division Championship	11:58
3	The BroMans (Jessie Godderz and Robbie E) (with Phil Heath) defeated Gunner and James Storm (c)	Tag team match for the TNA World Tag Team Championship	11:41
4	Gail Kim defeated ODB (c) and Brooke	Three-way match for the TNA Knockouts Championship	10:19
5	Bobby Roode defeated Kurt Angle	Singles match	20:58
6	Ethan Carter III defeated Norv Fernum	Singles match	03:26
7	Magnus defeated Sting by submission	Singles match	11:05
8	A.J. Styles defeated Bully Ray (c) (with Brooke)	No Disqualification match for the TNA World Heavyweight Championship	28:31
(c) / – the champion(s) heading into the match; P / – the match was broadcast on the pre-show

=== Tag team gauntlet match results ===
Order	Team	Elimination	Eliminated by
1	Bad Influence (Christopher Daniels and Kazarian)	2nd	Young and Park
2	Chavo Guerrero and Hernandez	1st	Bad Influence
3	Eric Young and Joseph Park	3rd	BroMans
4	The BroMans (Jessie Godderz and Robbie E)	Winners	N/A

== See also ==
- 2013 in professional wrestling
