= Dakota Darsow =

American professional wrestler (born 1987)

Personal information
- Born: Dakota Darsow; January 31, 1987 (age 39) Maple Grove, Minnesota, U.S.
- Education: University of Minnesota Crookston
- Family: Barry Darsow

Professional wrestling career
- Ring name(s): Dakota Darsow; Maverick Darsow; Barry Allen
- Billed height: 6 ft 0 in (183 cm)
- Billed weight: 180 lb (82 kg)
- Trained by: Barry Darsow; Florida Championship Wrestling; Lenny Lane
- Debut: 2008

Dakota Darsow (born January 31, 1987) is an American professional wrestler. He is best known for his time working in World Wrestling Entertainment (WWE) developmental territory Florida Championship Wrestling (FCW), under the ring names Maverick Darsow and Barry Allen. Darsow is a second-generation professional wrestler; his father Barry Darsow has also been a professional wrestler, best known as Krusher Kruschev, Demolition Smash, and Repo Man.

== Personal life ==
Darsow is a 2006 graduate of Maple Grove Senior High School in Maple Grove, Minnesota. He played football on the school team and was named an All-Conference Honorable Mention. He was signed by the University of Minnesota Crookston football team as a linebacker. Darsow is shown in the film Jobbers. As of 2015, he also works as a Roscommon County Sheriff's Deputy.

== Professional wrestling career ==
=== Early career ===
Before being signed by World Wrestling Entertainment, Darsow competed in several Minnesota based wrestling promotions such as French Lakes Wrestling Association and Pro Wrestling America. He also competed at Steel Domain Wrestling and Great Lakes Championship Wrestling,

=== World Wrestling Entertainment (2008–2009) ===
In late 2008, he signed a developmental contract with World Wrestling Entertainment and was sent to compete in Florida Championship Wrestling. He debuted under his real name in a surprising win over Ian Richardson. He would go on to change his name to Maverick Dakota and wrestled under that name for over a month. He competed in six-man tag team matches, with Brett DiBiase and Tank Mulligan as his tag team partners, losing to Lawrence Knight, Kaleb O'Neal and Tyson Tarver, but defeating Tristan Delta, Derrick Bateman, and Abraham Washington. In March, he would change his name to Barry Allen. After teaming with Jon Cutler and Dawson Alexander Esq. to defeat Abraham Saddam Washington and his Secret Service faction, he defeated DH Smith in a singles match on March 26.

On June 5, it was revealed that Darsow had been released from his WWE developmental contract.

=== Florida Underground Wrestling ===
==== NVUS and 2nd Coming (2010–2012) ====
On October 12, 2010 Darsow debuted for Florida Underground Wrestling and defeated Kennedy Kendrick in his first match. Darsow and Kendrick teamed up in November calling themselves "NVUS". In their first match they defeated Jimmy Whiplash and Vindetta. NVUS would be proclaimed as the first FUW Tag Team Champions and would defend their titles against multiple tag teams. They lost their first two title matches against Whiplash and Vindetta and against The Highwaymen (Butch Long and Marc Mandrake) but would retain their titles because they lost via DQ or count out. However, in their following matches they would beat their opponents legitimately until they lost them to The Heartbreak Express (Phil Davis & Sean Davis). They would regain the titles back by defeating Kahagas and Sideshow and lost them to the Hunks In Trunks (Nick Fame and Ryan Sorensen).

==== Singles competition (2012) ====
In the middle of March, Darsow would start feuding with Maxwell Chicago. Chicago would get the best of Darsow on March 13 and a week later Darsow repaid the favour. After the third match ending in a DQ win for Chicago the two would have one more match against each other where the victor would be Chicago. On May 15, 2012, Darsow defeated Sam Elias in a FUW Cuban Heavyweight Championship number one contendership match. He went up against the FUW Cuban Heavyweight Champion and former tag team partner, Wes Brisco, in their first match Darsow would win via DQ meaning that Brisco would retain his championship. On June 5, Brisco would defeat Darsow and Nick Fame in a three-way match for the Championship. On June 29, Lince Dorado defeated Darsow, James Alexander, Maxwell Chicago, Sideshow and Wayne Wonder to retain the FUW Flash Championship.

On October 2, Darsow would make his return losing to Damien Angel.

=== Total Nonstop Action Wrestling (2011, 2012) ===
On June 23, 2011, Darsow made an appearance on Total Nonstop Action Wrestling's Impact Wrestling television show, losing to Zema Ion in a three–way first round match of a tournament for a TNA contract, which also included Federico Palacios. Darsow returned to TNA on the July 5, 2012, episode of Impact Wrestling, where he was defeated by Flip Cassanova in a TNA X Division Championship tournament qualifying match. Three days later at Destination X, Darsow got another opportunity to earn his way back into the tournament, but was defeated by Mason Andrews in a four-way Last Chance match, which also included Rubix and Lars Only. On the following episode of Impact Wrestling, Darsow faced new X Division Champion Zema Ion in a losing effort. Darsow returned on the July 26 episode of Impact Wrestling, vying for a shot at the X Division Championship, but TNA World Heavyweight Champion Austin Aries opted not to grant him one and instead eliminated him from the running.

== Championships and accomplishments ==
- Florida Underground Wrestling
  - FUW Tag Team Championship (3 Times)- with Kennedy Kendrick
- Pro Wrestling Illustrated
  - PWI ranked him #340 of the top 500 singles wrestlers in the PWI 500 in 2010
