= Joaquin Wilde =

American professional wrestler (born 1986)

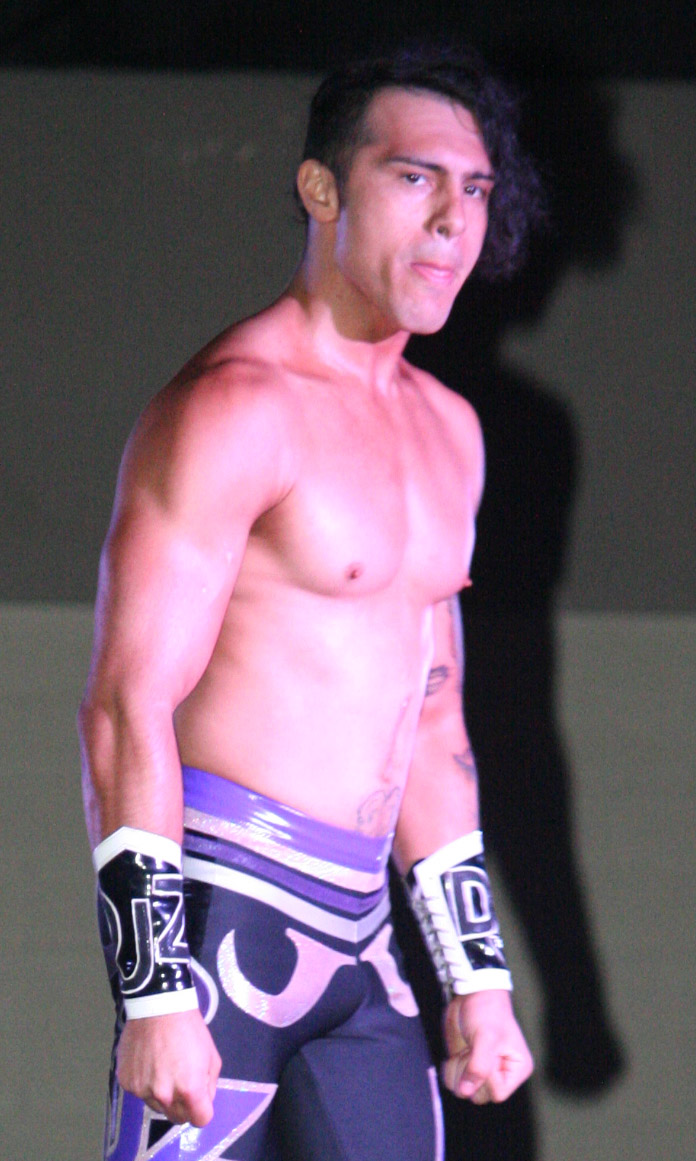
- Wilde in 2017

Personal information
- Born: Michael Paris; October 5, 1986 (age 39) Los Angeles, California, U.S.
- Education: West Virginia University
- Spouse: Rebecca Schott (m. 2019)
- Children: 1

Professional wrestling career
- Ring name(s): DJZ; DJ Zema; Joaquin Wilde; Michael Montecarlo; Shiima Xion; Zema Ion
- Billed height: 5 ft 7 in (1.70 m)
- Billed weight: 179 lb (81 kg)
- Billed from: Chicago, Illinois
- Trained by: IWC Iron City Wrestling Academy; WWE Performance Center; Discovery; Skayde
- Debut: August 21, 2004

Michael Paris (born October 5, 1986) is an American professional wrestler. He is signed to WWE, where he performs on the Raw brand, under the ring name Joaquin Wilde. He is a member of the Latino World Order. He was a former founding member of Legado Del Fantasma.

Paris began his career in 2004, wrestling on several independent promotions under the name of Shiima Xion. He had his first national exposure when he participated as Zema Ion in the X Division Showcase, a tournament held by Total Nonstop Action Wrestling. While he did not win the tournament, he signed a contract with TNA. He stayed with the promotion until 2018. During his time, he joined Robbie E and Jessie Godderz in the BroMans stable, changing his name to DJZ. He is a former two-time X Division Champion and one-time World Tag Team Champion with Andrew Everett. He has also worked for various other promotions, such as Major League Wrestling (MLW), Lucha Libre AAA Worldwide (AAA) and DDT Pro-Wrestling (DDT).

== Professional wrestling career ==
=== Early career (2002–2004) ===
In 2002, a 15-year-old Paris won a contest to design the first logo for Ring of Honor, which the promotion used until 2004. In 2003, Paris began training to become a professional wrestler at the Coalition of Competition in Pittsburgh, Pennsylvania under trainers Super Hentai, Shirley Doe, and Glenn Spectre. He trained there for 14 months before debuting as Shiima Xion, the "first Filipino male model of wrestling" on August 21, 2004, against Jason Gory in Wheeling, West Virginia for Black Diamond Wrestling. Shiima Xion competed throughout West Virginia and Ohio in late 2004, since he was not old enough to compete in the state of Pennsylvania. Shortly after turning 18, however, Xion began competing regularly for the International Wrestling Cartel, as well as making appearances in Chikara, Far North Wrestling, and Pro Wrestling Unplugged.

By early 2006, the Shiima Xion character had become more of a glam rock star than a male model, as Xion began wearing make-up to the ring, and had also changed his hair color from black to red/blonde. His bizarre hair style soon became his trademark, with Shiima becoming best known for hairspraying his hair during matches. The androgynous character eventually caught the attention of Japanese wrestling promoter Sanshiro Takagi, who invited 19-year-old Shiima to tour Japan with his company, Dramatic Dream Team (DDT) in the summer of 2006. Shiima Xion was featured in the Introducing... article in Pro Wrestling Illustrated's The Wrestler (volume 19, 2007). The magazine was released on newsstands nationwide on December 4, 2007, with a two-page article spread on Shiima.

=== Independent circuit (2004–2019) ===
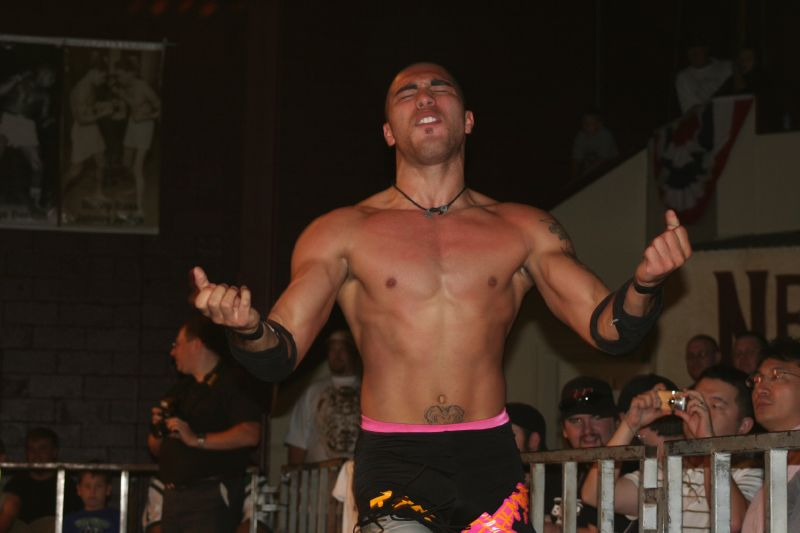
Shiima Xion wrestling at the former ECW Arena, 2008

Shiima Xion made his International Wrestling Cartel debut on November 6, 2004, in Munhall, Pennsylvania, shortly after his eighteenth birthday. Shiima lost to Jason Gory, who was also making his IWC debut that night. The two feuded into 2005, culminating at IWC No Excuses on July 29, 2005, where Gory came out victorious. Next month, Shiima would receive a shot at Shirley Doe's IWC World Heavyweight Championship and lost. For the next few months he would team with Chris Maverick as the International Males which ended with an IWC Tag Team Championship match against the Gambino Brothers Moving Company, which Xion and Maverick lost. Shiima would once again come across Gory at IWC Super Indy V on April 15, 2006, in which Shiima defeated Gory with the Filipino Destroyer. Post-match saw the two shake hands for the first time in their near two-year-long rivalry and eventually led to them forming a tag team known as Team Catfish and eventually Babyface Fire (BFF). BFF teamed for the first time on July 7, 2006, and were defeated by Chris Hero and Claudio Castagnoli. The team is best known for their scramble matches with the Gambino Brothers, Sexual Harassment, and the Cleveland Mafia. The second of these scrambles, which took place on December 9, 2006, saw BFF capture their first IWC Tag Team Championship. Xion and Gory held onto the belts until March 2007, in which The Gambino Brothers challenged the champions, despite both BFF members already competing in singles action earlier in the night. The challenge was accepted, and Xion was pinned by Marshall Gambino after interference from Jimmy DeMarco. After losing the titles, Shiima reached the final of the Super Indy VI Tournament but was defeated by Larry Sweeney. Later that year, after a violent feud with the Gambinos, BFF won their second IWC Tag Team Championship on December 8, 2007. They would hold onto the tag titles twice as long as their first reign, until Sexual Harassment defeated BFF for the belts in June 2008. They also lost their rematch in a huge TLC match in August 2008.

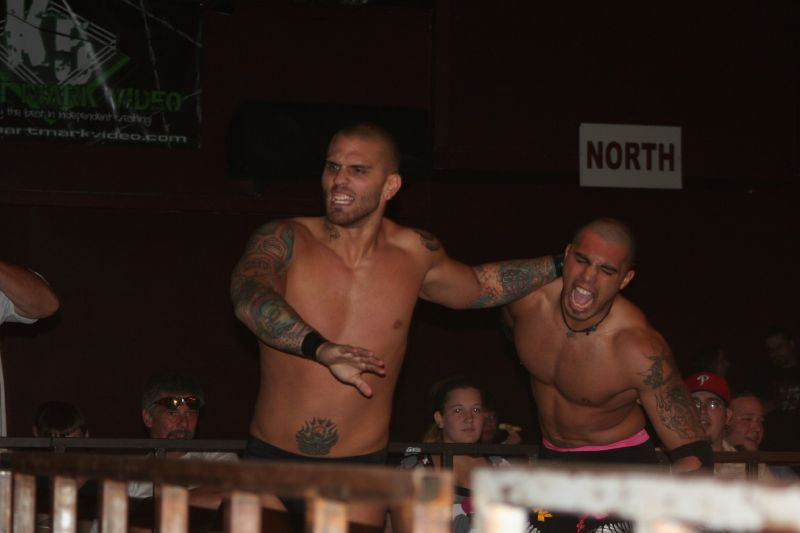
Sterling James Keenan (left) wrestling Shiima Xion (right) for Velocity Pro Wrestling, 2008

In September 2008, Xion defeated Marshall Gambino to qualify for another tournament, for the vacant IWC World Heavyweight Championship. Xion defeated Justin Idol, John McChesney, and Raymond Rowe to advance to the finals, where he defeated Jimmy DeMarco with a 630 splash to win the tournament and the title on October 26, 2008. After only one successful defence, Shiima lost the IWC World Heavyweight Championship to Raymond Rowe. On March 7, defeated Rowe in a no disqualification match for the World Heavyweight Championship. Their feud would culminate on March 28, where Shiima once again defeated him. Shiima's reign was littered with DQ finishes, usually Shiima getting himself disqualified. On December 12, Jimmy DeMarco defeated Shiima for the World Heavyweight Championship. On January 30, 2010, the two went up against each other in an extreme rules match with Shane Douglas as the special referee which DeMarco won. On his way to the Super Indy IX Final, Xion defeated Ricky Reyes, Frightmare and Lince Dorado. On May 8, in the final, he defeated both Azrieal and Johnny Gargano to win the tournament and the IWC Super Indy Championship. On August 21, he defended the title in a steel cage against Super Hentai and the two would face off once again in January 2011 where Shiima lost the title. 2011 would prove to be an annoying year for Shiima as he had multiple title shots including several IWC World Heavyweight Championship shots and one IWC Super Indy Championship shot. Shiima would leave IWC to focus on other promotions, namely Total Nonstop Action Wrestling. However, he has returned under his TNA name Zema Ion for sporadic appearances. On October 19, 2013, as Shiima Xion returned to IWC at Retro reunion, defeating Facade for the Super Indy Championship.

=== Mexican promotions (2008–2019) ===
Shiima Xion made his Desastre Total Ultraviolento debut on May 3, 2008, in Mexico City, Mexico in a tag match with Joe Lider against El Generico and Crazy Boy. Xion lost the match after a top rope brainbuster from El Generico. Xion returned to DTU on July 11, 2009, in Tulancingo, Mexico in a three-way light tube deathmatch with Crazy Boy and Extreme Tiger. Xion lost after a Swanton bomb from Extreme Tiger. Xion also competed in DTU's "Fashion" event on July 26, 2009, in Mexico City, where Xion challenged for the DTU championship in a 3-way match with Aero Boy and Ragde. Aero Boy became the new DTU champion after pinning Xion. Shiima joined the AAA roster in mid-2009, debuting on a Cuautitlan, Mexico TV taping in a six-man tag that featured Xion, Teddy Hart and Electroshock going against La Parka, Jack Evans and Extreme Tiger. Xion was pinned following a double stomp from Tiger. Xion also wrestled for International Wrestling Revolution Group, Lucha POP and X-Project.

On April 5, 2017, DJZ took part in an event held by The Crash promotion in Mexico City, battling Rey Horus, Laredo Kid, Mr. 450, Septimo Dragon and Último Ninja in a number one Contendership match for the Cruiserweight Title. During the match, DJZ took a 450° splash from Laredo Kid and immediately felt something was wrong, but finished the match, believing it "was just the wind knocked out of him." Examination at a Mexican hospital that night, however, revealed he had suffered a ruptured colon, causing internal bleeding, and forcing him to undergo emergency surgery.

DJZ appeared at Lucha Libre AAA Worldwide's Through TNA/GFW/Impact Wrestling partnership with AAA Triplemanía XXV and Triplemanía XXVI.

=== Total Nonstop Action Wrestling / Impact Wrestling ===
==== X Division Champion (2011–2013) ====
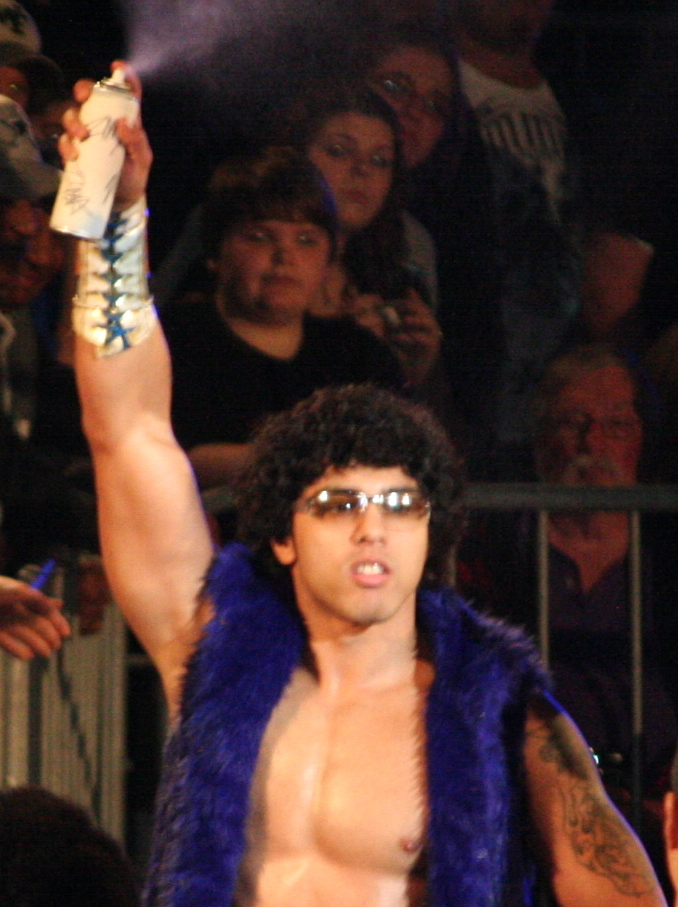
Ion in 2012

On June 23, 2011, Paris made an appearance on Total Nonstop Action Wrestling's Impact Wrestling television show, working under the ring name Zema Ion, defeating Dakota Darsow and Federico Palacios in a three–way X Division match to advance to the tournament finals at Destination X, where a contract with the promotion would be at stake. At the pay-per-view, Ion competed in a four-way match against Jack Evans, Low Ki and the eventual winner of the match, Austin Aries. On July 24 it was reported that Paris had signed a contract with TNA. Zema Ion made his return to TNA on the August 11 edition of Impact Wrestling, appearing in a backstage segment, where Eric Bischoff introduced new rules to the X Division. The following week, Ion took part in a gauntlet match to determine the X Division rankings. After eliminating Mark Haskins from the match, Ion was himself eliminated by Jesse Sorensen, placing him fifth in the rankings. Ion returned on the September 28 episode of Impact Wrestling, working in a five-man ladder match, which was won by Brian Kendrick.

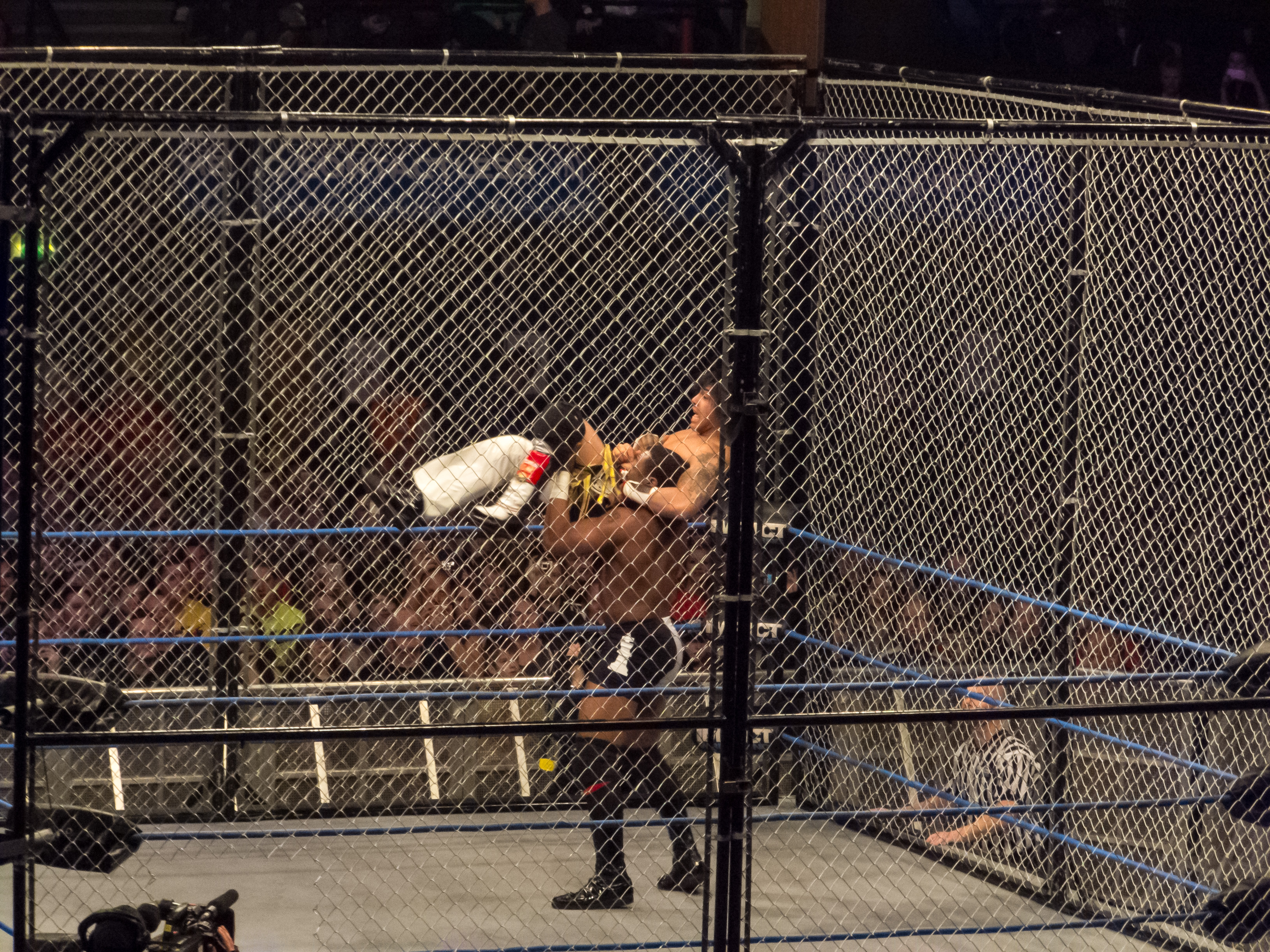
Ion wrestling Kenny King

On the December 15 edition of Impact Wrestling, Ion started Best of Three Series with Anthony Nese to determine the third and final challenger for the X Division Championship at Genesis. Ion, now wrestling as a heel, won the first match of the series. Two weeks later, Ion defeated Nese in a Contract on a Pole match to win the series 2-1 and advance to the pay-per-view. On January 8, 2012, at Genesis, Ion was the second man eliminated from the X Division Championship match, which also included Austin Aries, Jesse Sorensen and Kid Kash. Ion then helped Aries defeat Sorensen and retain his title. On February 12 at Against All Odds, Ion defeated Sorensen in an X Division number one contender's match, after Sorensen was unable to continue after suffering a legitimate injury and was counted out. Ion received his shot at the X Division Championship on the March 8 edition of Impact Wrestling, winning the match via disqualification, after champion Austin Aries was caught using Ion's hair spray on him; as a result, Aries retained his title. Ion received another title shot on March 18 at Victory Road, but was defeated by Aries via submission. On the following edition of Impact Wrestling, Ion failed again to capture the X Division Championship after he fought Aries, Kid Kash and Anthony Neese to a no contest, following interference from Bully Ray. Ion received another shot at the X Division Championship on the May 10 episode of Impact Wrestling, but was again defeated by Aries. On the June 14 episode of Impact Wrestling, Ion competed in his first Ultimate X match, where he and Chris Sabin unsuccessfully challenged Aries for the X Division Championship.

On July 8, at Destination X, Ion won a tournament to become the new X Division Champion, defeating Kenny King, Mason Andrews and Sonjay Dutt in an Ultimate X match. He would retain the title against wrestlers like Kenny King, Sonjay Dutt and Douglas Williams until Bound for Glory, where Ion lost the title to Rob Van Dam. Ion received his rematch for the title on the October 25 episode of Impact Wrestling, but was again defeated by Van Dam. Ion tried to regain the title, but he lost every match he had.

==== The BroMans (2013–2015) ====
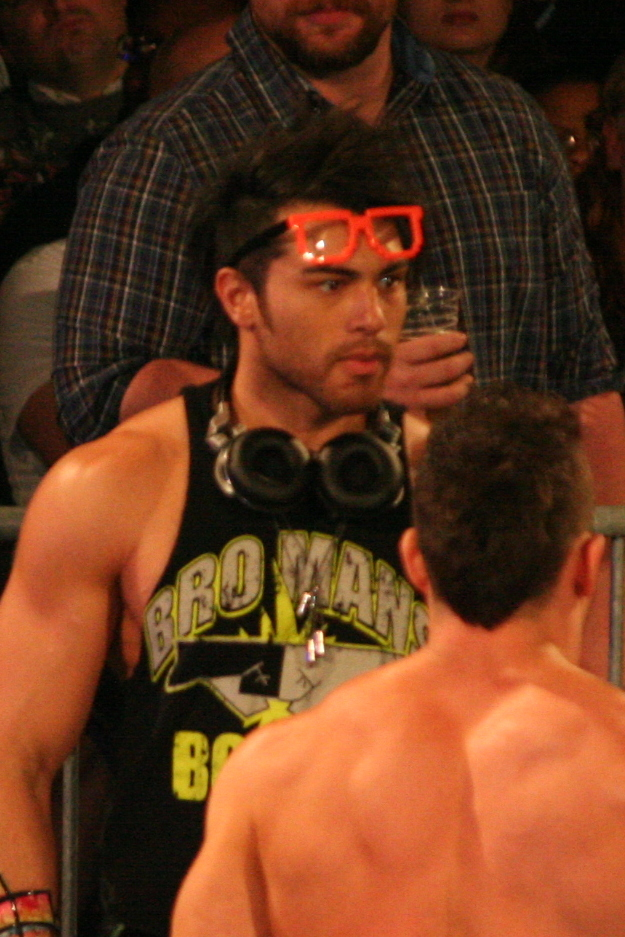
When Ion aligned himself with The BroMans, he changed his name and gimmick to DJZ

After several months out injured, he returned to Impact on a regular basis and on the November 28 edition of Impact, Zema joined The BroMans as their personal DJ. Ion won the Feast or Fired TNA X Division Championship briefcase. On January 30, 2014 (Airing on February 6, 2014), unsuccessfully cashed in his briefcase against TNA X Division Champion, Austin Aries. This made him the first person to unsuccessfully cash in the X Division Feast or Fired briefcase. In February 2014, his ring name changed to DJZ. On February 23, 2014 The Wolves (Eddie Edwards and Davey Richards) defeated The BroMans (Jessie Godderz and Robbie E) for the TNA World Tag Team Championship only to lose them the following week to The Bromans during the TNA/Wrestle-1 Kaisen: Outbreak supershow event on March 2. Since then, the Wolves have had numerous rematches for the titles on Impact Wrestling, with the BroMans either using excuses to avoid defending the belts, having the third member of the team DJZ fill in for defenses, or by getting blatantly disqualified. At the PPV, all three BroMans defended the championships against the Wolves in a three-on-two handicap match. On May 29, 2014, TNA announced on their website that Texas wrestling legend Kevin Von Erich would accompany his two sons Marshall and Ross for their first ever nationally televised match at the pay-per-view. At the Slammiversary XII The BroMans fought the Von Erichs and lost disqualification when Jessie Godderz attacked Ross and Marshal with a steel chair however Kevin ran into the ring and made the save.

On the April 17, 2015, episode of Impact Wrestling, after losing a tag team match to Dirty Heels, The BroMans ended when Godderz attacked DJZ and Robbie E. On the May 29 episode of Impact Wrestling, DJZ officially started his singles run as a face, challenging for the X Division Championship in a losing effort. On June 10 episode of Impact Wrestling, DJZ competed in a X Division Championship tournament along with Tigre Uno and Mandrews which the match was won by Tigre Uno. After the match, DJZ was viciously attacked by Jessie Godderz with that setting up a match the next week which DJZ failed to win. At Slammiversary, he competed in a three-way match for the X Division Championship but lost the match. At Bound for Glory, he competed in an Ultimate X match for the X Division Championship in a losing effort. During October and November, he competed in the TNA World Title Series he ended of his first block by defeating Mandrews and Tigre Uno (with the only exception of Manik), however he finally gained 6 points in pinning Manik in the following weeks, which also involved Uno, to advance in the round of 16, where he was defeated by Ethan Carter III in the first round, failing to advance to the quarterfinals and being eliminated from the tournament.

==== Championship reigns (2016–2018) ====
On the April 12, 2016, episode of Impact Wrestling, DJZ defeated X Division Champion Trevor Lee in a non-title match. After the match, He was attacked by Gregory Shane Helms but was saved by Eddie Edwards. At Slammiversary, he participated in a four-way match for the X Division Championship, but lost the match. At Destination X, he won a ladder match to earn a title shot for the X Division Championship. Later, he defeated Mike Bennett with the help of the X Division wrestlers.

On the September 1 episode of Impact Wrestling, DJZ defeated Rockstar Spud, Mandrews, Trevor Lee, Andrew Everett and Braxton Sutter in an Ultimate X gauntlet match to win the TNA X Division Championship. On the September 22 episode of Impact Wrestling, he successfully defended his title against Trevor Lee and against Eddie Edwards on the October 29 episode of Impact Wrestling. He successfully defended his title against Trevor Lee at Bound for Glory. On the October 6 episode of Impact Wrestling, DJZ took part in Team X Gold, teaming with Braxton Sutter and Mandrews, to defeat The Helms Dynasty and Marshe Rockett. On the October 13 episode of Impact Wrestling, he successfully defended his title against Marshe Rockett. On the October 27 episode of Impact Wrestling, the team defeated Decay and Rockstar Spud. On the November 3 episode of Impact Wrestling, the team defeated The Helms Dynasty and Marshe Rockett and Rockstar Spud and Decay in a three-way tag team match. They defeated once again the two teams, this time in an Elimination match on the October 24 episode of Impact Wrestling. On the December 1 episode of Impact Wrestling, DJZ successfully defended his title against Braxton Sutter and Mandrews. After the match, he was attacked by Mandrews.

On January 6, 2017, at the event One Night Only: Live!, DJZ successfully defended his title against Andrew Everett, Braxton Sutter and Trevor Lee, in a four-way elimination match. On January 11, DJZ lost his X Division Championship to Trevor Lee. DJZ was not used by Impact Wrestling between the March 5 taping of Impact, which aired on April 13, where he lost to Davey Richards, and Impact vs Lucha Underground on April 6, 2018. He said he did not know his status with the company and if or when Impact would utilize him again. In the meantime, he has been working for several independent and Impact-partnership promotions in the US, Japan and Mexico, including Lucha Libre AAA Worldwide.

DJZ would eventually return to an Impact branded event at their co-promoted show with Lucha Underground during WrestleCon 2018, and his official return in a six-way match at Impact Wrestling Redemption later that month. On April 24, 2018, DJZ and Andrew Everett (billed as Z&E) defeated Eli Drake and Scott Steiner to win the Impact World Tag Team Championship. On December 31, DJZ announced that his contract with Impact had expired and would depart from the company, ending his seven-year tenure with Impact Wrestling.

=== WWE (2019–present) ===
==== Early beginnings (2019–2020) ====
On March 18, 2019, it was reported that WWE was attempting to sign DJZ. On May 14, 2019, WWE confirmed that DJZ had signed a contract. The following month, it was revealed he would be changing his ring name to Joaquin Wilde. In June, it was announced that Wilde would compete in a tournament named NXT Breakout Tournament, where he made his debut on the June 26 episode of NXT, losing to Angel Garza in the first round of the tournament. On the December 13 episode of 205 Live, Wilde made his debut on the brand defeating James Tapia.

==== Legado Del Fantasma (2020–2022) ====
On the April 1 episode of NXT, after a match with Kushida, Wilde was abducted in the parking lot by a van full of men in black clothes and luchadore masks, continuing a previous storyline started when the same happened to Raul Mendoza weeks prior. On the June 10 episode of NXT, Wilde made his return as he along with Mendoza were revealed as the mysterious masked men and they aligned themselves with El Hijo del Fantasma as they attacked Drake Maverick, thus turning heel. On the June 17 episode of NXT, El Hijo del Fantasma, now known as Santos Escobar, would reveal the name of his new faction with Wilde and Mendoza to be Legado Del Fantasma. Escobar, Wilde and Mendoza would once again attack Maverick as Escobar put Maverick through a table. In their first match as a team, Legado del Fantasma defeated Maverick and Breezango (Fandango and Tyler Breeze) in a six-man tag team match on the second night of The Great American Bash.

Wilde and Mendoza began competing in NXT's tag team division and on 205 Live. At NXT TakeOver XXX, Wilde and Mendoza faced Breezango and the team of Oney Lorcan and Danny Burch in a triple threat match to determine the #1 contenders for the NXT Tag Team Championship but Wilde and Mendoza would be unsuccessful. At the night one of Super Tuesday, Legado lost to Isaiah "Swerve" Scott and Breezango in a street fight when Scott pinned Escobar, leading up to a match between Escobar and Scott for Escobar's Cruiserweight Championship at NXT TakeOver 31, where Wilde and Mendoza assisted Escobar in retaining the title.

In 2021, Wilde and Mendoza entered the 2021 Dusty Rhodes Tag Team Classic in which they lost to the eventual winners MSK (Nash Carter and Wes Lee) in the semifinal round. They also faced MSK and Grizzled Young Veterans (James Drake and Zack Gibson) on night one of NXT TakeOver: Stand & Deliver in a match with the Tag Team titles on the line, which MSK won. On the night two of Stand & Deliver, Wilde and Mendoza assisted Escobar in defeating the reigning Cruiserweight Champion Jordan Devlin in a ladder match to become the undisputed Cruiserweight Champion. At NXT Takeover: In Your House, Legado del Fantasma would face NXT North American Champion, Bronson Reed and NXT Tag Team Champions, MSK in a winners take all, six man tag team match in which, Legado del Fantasma would lose the match. On the August 24 episode of NXT, Elektra Lopez made her debut assisting Legado Del Fantasma to a win against Hit Row.

On the October 7 episode of SmackDown, Legado Del Fantasma (with Zelina Vega replacing Lopez) attacked Hit Row during their entrance, marking the group's main roster debut.

==== Latino World Order (2023–present) ====
On the March 10 episode of SmackDown, Wilde alongside the rest of Legado Del Fantasma helped Rey Mysterio against The Judgment Day, turning face in the process. On the March 31 episode of SmackDown, Rey reformed the Latino World Order and invited Legado Del Fantasma to join as a token of appreciation for aiding him in his fight against his son, Dominik, and The Judgement Day. On the November 10 episode of SmackDown, Escobar defected from LWO and removed Vega, Wilde and Del Toro from Legado del Fantasma the following week. On the December 1 episode of SmackDown, Wilde wrestled his first main roster singles match against Escobar but was defeated. Wilde and Del Toro participated in the 2024 Dusty Rhodes Tag Team Classic tournament, defeating Chase University's Duke Hudson and Riley Osborne on the January 16, 2024 episode of NXT but lost to Carmelo Hayes and Trick Williams in the semifinals two weeks later. At Night 2 of the 2024 WWE Draft, LWO were drafted to the Raw brand.

On June 2, 2025 taping of WWE Speed, Wilde was knocked out during a match causing him to be pulled from the six-man tag match at the WWE and AAA event Worlds Collide.

== Personal life ==
Paris is of Filipino descent, being raised by a single mother who emigrated from the Philippines. He went to high school at Oak Glen High School in New Cumberland, West Virginia and attended West Virginia University, where he majored in journalism. Paris was featured in the documentary Slammed: Inside Indie Wrestling. Paris says he has started suffering medical issues and wrestling-related injuries since turning 30. The first of these was in September 2016, when he broke his wrist in a match he wrestled for free in Chicago, Illinois which required a permanent screw to be implanted to fix.

In May 2013, he started a GiveForward campaign to raise money to help pay to remove a benign tumor in his bladder, which had been discovered during an emergency appendectomy. On April 5, 2017, Paris suffered a second "colon-related health scare" after a 450° splash from Laredo Kid during a match for The Crash in Mexico City caused a ruptured colon and internal bleeding, forcing him into emergency surgery. Doctors gave him a 20% chance of having to use a colostomy bag for the rest of his life. The surgery was successful and he returned to the ring two months later at an International Wrestling Cartel show, losing to Adam Cole. This injury resulted in thousands of dollars of debt related to hospital bills and an estimated $10,000 in lost revenue from missed bookings.

Since 2017, Paris has been in a relationship with Rebecca Schott. They got married in October 2019. Their first child, a daughter, was born in 2021.

== Other media ==
Paris, as Joaquin Wilde, has appeared in WWE SuperCard WWE 2K22, WWE 2K23 and WWE 2K24, WWE 2K25 and WWE 2K26 as a playable character.

== Championships and accomplishments ==
- AAW: Professional Wrestling Redefined
  - AAW Heritage Championship (2 times)
- Absolute Intense Wrestling
  - AIW Absolute Championship (1 time)
  - AIW Intense Championship (1 time)
  - AIW Tag Team Championship (1 time) – with Shawn Blaze
  - Todd Pettengill Invitational (2011)
  - Triple Crown Champion
- Championship Wrestling Experience
  - CWE Undisputed Championship (1 time)
- Dramatic Dream Team
  - Takechi Six Man Tag Scramble Cup (2006) – with Kudo and Mikami
- Far North Wrestling
  - FNW Cruiserweight Championship (2 times)
- Glory Pro Wrestling
  - United Glory Tag Team Championship (1 time) – with Everett Connors
- Independent Wrestling Association East Coast
  - IWA East Coast Zero-G Crown (2008)
- International Wrestling Cartel
  - IWC World Heavyweight Championship (3 times)
  - IWC Super Indy Championship (2 times)
  - IWC Tag Team Championship (2 times) – with Jason Gory
  - IWC Super Indy IX Tournament (2010)
- International Pro Wrestling
  - IPW Texas Heavyweight Championship (3 times)
- Lucha Libre AAA Worldwide
  - Best Match of the Night (2017) – with Andrew Everett vs. Drago and Aerostar
- New Era Pro Wrestling
  - NEPW United States Tag Team Championship (1 time) – with Jason Gory
- Pro Wrestling Illustrated
  - PWI ranked him #71 of the top 500 singles wrestlers in the PWI 500 in 2013
- Real Championship Wrestling
  - RCW Cruiserweight Championship (1 time)
- Total Nonstop Action Wrestling / Impact Wrestling
  - Impact World Tag Team Championship (1 time) – with Andrew Everett
  - TNA / Impact X Division Championship (2 times)
  - TNA X Division Championship Tournament (2012)
  - Feast or Fired (2013 – X Division Championship contract)
