= Austin Aries and Bobby Roode =

Professional wrestling tag team

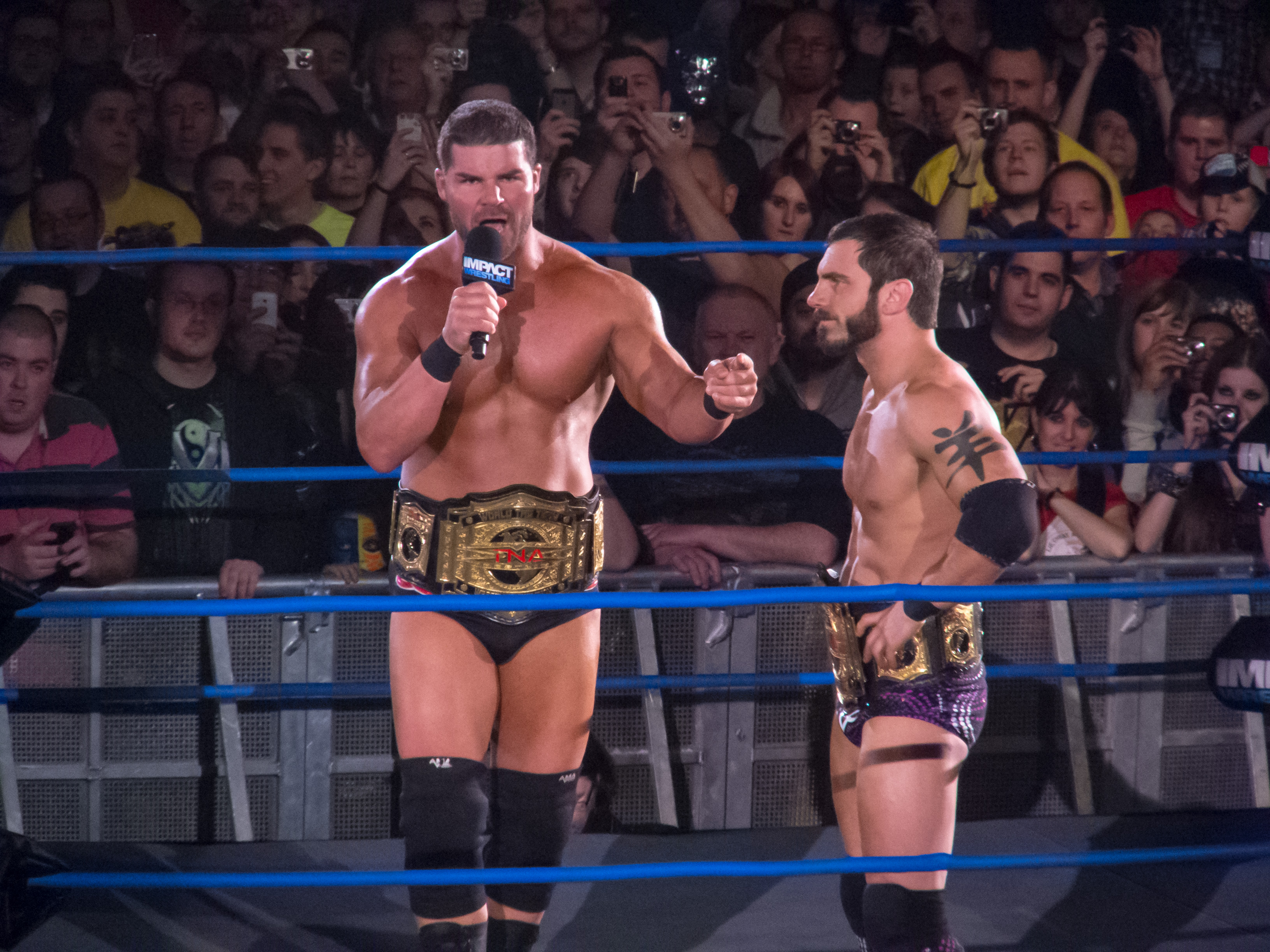
- Roode and Aries as TNA World Tag Team Champions

Tag team
- Members: Austin Aries; Bobby Roode
- Name(s): Austin Aries and Bobby Roode; Dirty Heels
- Billed heights: 5 ft 9 in (1.75 m) - Aries; 6 ft 0 in (1.83 m) - Roode
- Combined billed weight: 442 lb (200 kg)
- Debut: February 7, 2013
- Disbanded: August 5, 2015
- Years active: 2013; 2015

Austin Aries and Bobby Roode performed as a tag team in Total Nonstop Action Wrestling (TNA) in 2013, as well as in 2015, when they were later known as Dirty Heels. They held the TNA World Tag Team Championship once, in 2013.

== History ==
=== Formation ===
On July 8, Aries defeated Bobby Roode in the main event of Destination X to become the new TNA World Heavyweight Champion. On July 17, TNA president Dixie Carter announced that Aries had signed a new long-term deal with the promotion. Aries and Roode had a non-title rematch on the July 19 episode of Impact Wrestling, which ended in a no contest, when both competitors were attacked by a group of masked assailants, known only as the "Aces & Eights". On August 12 at Hardcore Justice, Aries successfully defended the TNA World Heavyweight Championship against Roode, with a pre-match stipulation preventing Roode from getting another rematch for the title as long as Aries was champion. During the following weeks, Aries moved from Roode to defending TNA against the Aces & Eights.

On the December 13 episode of Impact Wrestling, Aries was revealed as the man who paid the Aces & Eights to prevent Bobby Roode, who originally paid the group to help him win the World Heavyweight Championship, from winning at the pay-per-view, which led Jeff Hardy to issue him a title challenge. On the December 20 episode of Impact Wrestling, Aries was unsuccessful in his challenge for Hardy's World Heavyweight Championship, following interference from Bobby Roode. Aries and Roode faced off in a number one contenders match on the December 27 episode of Impact Wrestling. The match ended in a no contest after the two attacked referee Earl Hebner and then were, in turn attacked by Hardy. The rivalry culminated in a three-way elimination match on January 13, 2013, at Genesis, where Aries failed again to regain the World Heavyweight Championship from Hardy.

=== TNA World Tag Team Champions (2013) ===
On January 25, at the tapings of the February 7 episode of Impact Wrestling in Manchester, England, Roode and Aries defeated Chavo Guerrero Jr. and Hernandez to win the TNA World Tag Team Championship, thus giving Aries the TNA Triple Crown. Roode and Aries made their first successful title defense on March 10 at Lockdown, defeating Bad Influence (Christopher Daniels and Kazarian) and Chavo Guerrero, Jr. and Hernandez in a three-way match. On the March 21 episode of Impact Wrestling, Aries and Roode defeated Guerrero and Hernandez to retain the TNA World Tag Team Championship, following interference from Daniels and Kazarian. Afterwards, the champions would be attacked by Daniels and Kazarian On the April 11 episode of Impact Wrestling, Roode and Aries lost the TNA World Tag Team Championship back to Guerrero and Hernandez in a Two-out-of-Three Falls match, ending their reign at 76 days. Aries and Roode received their rematch on the April 25 episode of Impact Wrestling, but were again defeated by Guerrero and Hernandez after an inadvertent interference from Christopher Daniels and Kazarian. Aries and Roode faced Daniels and Kazarian in number one contenders match on the May 9 episode of Impact Wrestling, however, the match ended in a no contest after special guest referee James Storm superkicked Aries and Daniels and walked out on the match. Aries and Roode received another shot at Guerrero and Hernandez's titles on June 2 at Slammiversary XI, in a fatal four-way elimination match, which was won by Gunner and James Storm. Roode turned on Aries to form EGO with Daniels and Kazarian.

=== Reunion (2015) ===
In May 2015, Roode and Aries reunited as faces in pursuit of the vacant TNA World Tag Team Championship, they both agreed to a best of five series with The Wolves. On June 3, 2015, in the third match of the series, with The Wolves up 2–0, Aries pressured Roode to hit Eddie Edwards with a steel chair. As Roode refused, Aries distracted the referee and Roode hit Edwards with a low blow and hit him with a steel chair to win the match, turning heel in the process. They lost the Best of 5 series to The Wolves for the tag titles in the fifth match.

On the July 29, 2015 episode of Impact Wrestling, Aries agreed to face Rockstar Spud, with Aries's career and Spud's "Rockstar" moniker on the line, stating if he couldn't beat Spud he didn't deserve to be there. On the August 5, 2015 episode of Impact Wrestling, Aries ultimately lost the match, and as a result had to leave TNA. After the match, Aries raised Spud's hand, and the two embraced. The following week on Impact Wrestling, Aries' loss angered Roode, who proceeded to assault Spud.

On November 14, 2015, The Dirty Heels reunited at House of Hardcore 11 where they lost to The Wolves in the main event for the TNA World Tag Team Championship.

== Championships and accomplishments ==
- Total Nonstop Action Wrestling
  - TNA World Tag Team Championship (1 time)
