= TNA Genesis (2012) =

2012 Total Nonstop Action Wrestling pay-per-view event

Genesis (2012)
- Promotional poster featuring Jeff Hardy
- Promotion: Total Nonstop Action Wrestling
- Date: January 8, 2012
- City: Orlando, Florida
- Venue: Impact Zone
- Attendance: 1,100
- Tagline: "On the 8th Day..."

Pay-per-view chronology
← Previous; Final Resolution	Next → Against All Odds

Genesis chronology
← Previous; 2011	Next → 2013

The 2012 Genesis was a professional wrestling pay-per-view (PPV) event produced by the Total Nonstop Action Wrestling (TNA) promotion, that took place on January 8, 2012 at Impact Wrestling Zone in Orlando, Florida. It was the seventh event under the Genesis chronology and first event of the 2012 TNA PPV schedule.

Eight matches were contested at the event. The main event saw Bobby Roode successfully defend the TNA World Heavyweight Championship against Jeff Hardy. In other prominent matches, Crimson and Matt Morgan retained the TNA World Tag Team Championship facing Samoa Joe and Magnus, Abyss won a Monster's Ball match against Bully Ray, and Austin Aries retained the TNA X Division Championship in a Four-Corners Elimination match against Kid Kash, Jesse Sorensen and Zema Ion in the opening bout.

In October 2017, with the launch of the Global Wrestling Network, the event became available to stream on demand. It would later be available on Impact Plus in May 2019.

== Storylines ==
Other on-screen personnel
Commentator	Mike Tenay
Commentator	Taz
Ring announcer	Jeremy Borash
Referee	Rudy Charles
Referee	Mark "Slick" Johnson
Referee	Andrew Thomas
Interviewers	Jeremy Borash

Genesis featured eight professional wrestling matches that involved different wrestlers from pre-existing scripted feuds and storylines. Wrestlers portrayed villains, heroes, or less distinguishable characters in the scripted events that built tension and culminated in a wrestling match or series of matches.

The main feud entering Genesis was centered on Jeff Hardy and defending champion Bobby Roode, competing over for the TNA World Heavyweight Championship. At Final Resolution, Bobby Roode went to a draw with A.J. Styles in a 30 Minute Iron Man match to retain his championship and Jeff Hardy defeated Jeff Jarrett in a stipulated Cage match to earn his shot at the World Title, as in turn, Jarrett's loss meant that he and Karen would be fired from the company.

Another main rivalry featured Kurt Angle in a singles match with James Storm for the second consecutive time on PPV. On the December 15 edition of Impact Wrestling, Angle complained to TNA General Manager Sting and provided the belief that Sting, giving him 90 minutes to spare for preparation, threw him into TNA World Heavyweight Championship match with Storm, who screwed him out of his World Title reign using a "loaded" superkick in their match back in October and at Final Resolution, expressing his desire for a rematch. However, Sting felt Storm beat him fairly twice and a third match was unnecessary. Unhappy, Angle declared he would beat down people in Storm's hometown until he gets his rematch. The following week, Storm admitted that Angle controlled 3 quarters of their match, but that he Tim Tebow'd Angle in the 4th quarter. In response, Angle appeared via video screen targeting and later attacking people at Storm's favorite local bar in his hometown of Nashville, Tennessee, in an effort to get Storm to give in. The following week, Storm accepted the rematch by retaliating with a Last Call superkick to Angle during his match with Rob Van Dam, resulting in Angle picking up the disqualification victory.

Another feud was between two former Immortal associates, Abyss and Bully Ray, heading into Genesis to compete in a Monster's Ball match, where if Abyss lost, he would have to rejoin Immortal. At Turning Point, after his separation from Immortal, Abyss partnered with Mr. Anderson to defeat his former Immortal allies and new enemies, Bully Ray and Scott Steiner. On the December 15 edition of Impact Wrestling, Abyss, forced to coexist with Immortal, was randomly drawn to team with Steiner in wake of the Wild Card Tournament to decide new contenders for the Tag Titles. As expected, Abyss turned on Steiner lifting him up around the torso from the side and executing the Black Hole Slam in their semifinal match against A.J Styles and Kazarian, giving them the win. Afterwards, Ray knocked the actions of Abyss as being "deplorable" after all Immortal did for him. Upon asking Abyss what he wanted, Abyss challenged Ray to a Monster's Ball match and agreed to rejoin Immortal if he lost.

Aligned with Ric Flair as his manager, Immortal member Gunner began a mission of destruction that started with former Immortal referee, Garett Bischoff, who managed two pinfall victories over Gunner that enraged him enough to piledrive Bischoff into the exposed concrete floor, consequently sidelining him in terms of storyline. The next victims lined up were Jesse Neal and Douglas Williams over the next following weeks. On the January 5 edition of Impact Wrestling, TNA General Manager Sting banned Flair from accompanying Gunner to the ring to even out the playing field in Gunner's match against Rob Van Dam, which ended in a double countout after Gunner's pernicious tactics backfired when Van Dam back body dropped him onto the concrete floor. The rematch was later announced to take place at Genesis.

The personal feud between D'Angelo Dinero and Devon reached a climax over their relationship with Devon's own kids. In June, Dinero played the good Samaritan by aiding Devon in his feud with Mexican America, but Devon tried to reject the help because of Dinero's influence on his sons, Terrell and Terrence. Two months later, Devon altered his attitude toward Dinero for the better and by September, they both began teaming up in unavailing efforts to capture the TNA World Tag Team Championship with their tag title match at Final Resolution being the second time. However, the losses had its effect and on the following Impact, Devon addressed his issues with Dinero, fed up with Dinero trying to assume his parental role, but Dinero asserted that his kids wanted a "cool Dad" keeping up with the times and not clinging onto the past. Due to his strong influence, Dinero, who turned on Devon, was also able to convince Devon's kids to turn on their own father, claiming that they were now his kids. The next week, before an attack by Devon ensued, Dinero announced his match against Devon at Genesis.

Samoa Joe and Magnus took on defending champions Matt Morgan and Crimson for the TNA World Tag Team Championship. This match came together based on a Wild Card Tournament that was instituted in order to randomly pair wrestlers together to decide number one contenders to the Tag Titles. Joe and Magnus advanced the whole way through, last beating A.J Styles and Kazarian to win the tournament.

The Knockouts feud entering Genesis was defending champion Gail Kim facing Mickie James, continuing their fight over the TNA Women's Knockout Championship. At Final Resolution, Gail Kim retained the title over James by capitalizing on a distraction from Madison Rayne. On the December 29 and January 5 editions of Impact Wrestling, James was unsuccessful in her attempts to dispossess Kim of the Knockouts Championship and TNA Knockouts Tag Team Championship. However, a rematch between the two for the Knockouts Title was subsequently placed on the Genesis line-up.

Austin Aries was scheduled to defend the TNA X Division Championship against top contenders Kid Kash, Jesse Sorensen, and the winner of a Best of Three Series between Anthony Nese and Zema Ion. Ion won the first match by pinfall, Nese won the second match by pinfall, but Ion won the third in a Contract on a Pole match.

== Results ==
No.	Results	Stipulations	Times
1	Austin Aries (c) defeated Kid Kash, Jesse Sorensen and Zema Ion	Four-Corners Elimination match for the TNA X Division Championship	10:59
2	Devon defeated D'Angelo Dinero	Singles match	10:28
3	Gunner (with Ric Flair) defeated Rob Van Dam	Singles match	06:43
4	Gail Kim (c) (with Madison Rayne) defeated Mickie James (with Velvet Sky) by disqualification	Singles match for the TNA Women's Knockout Championship	06:27
5	Abyss defeated Bully Ray	Monster's Ball match Had Abyss lost, he would rejoin Immortal.	15:02
6	Crimson and Matt Morgan (c) defeated Magnus and Samoa Joe	Tag team match for the TNA World Tag Team Championship	09:25
7	Kurt Angle defeated James Storm	Singles match	14:25
8	Jeff Hardy defeated Bobby Roode (c) by disqualification	Singles match for the TNA World Heavyweight Championship	19:44
(c) / – the champion(s) heading into the match

=== Wild Card Tournament ===
Quarterfinals
Abyss/Steiner	Pin
Hernandez/Terry	4:13
Styles/Kazarian	Pin
Daniels/Van Dam	5:00
Magnus/Joe	Pin
Williams/Robbie	3:58
Young/ODB	Pin
Anarquia/Moore	4:00

Semifinals
Abyss/Steiner	7:00
Styles/Kazarian	Pin
Magnus/Joe	Pin
Young/ODB	5:00

Finals
Styles/Kazarian	7:00
Magnus/Joe	Pin

== See also ==
- 2012 in professional wrestling
