= Jesse Sorensen =

American professional wrestler (born 1989)

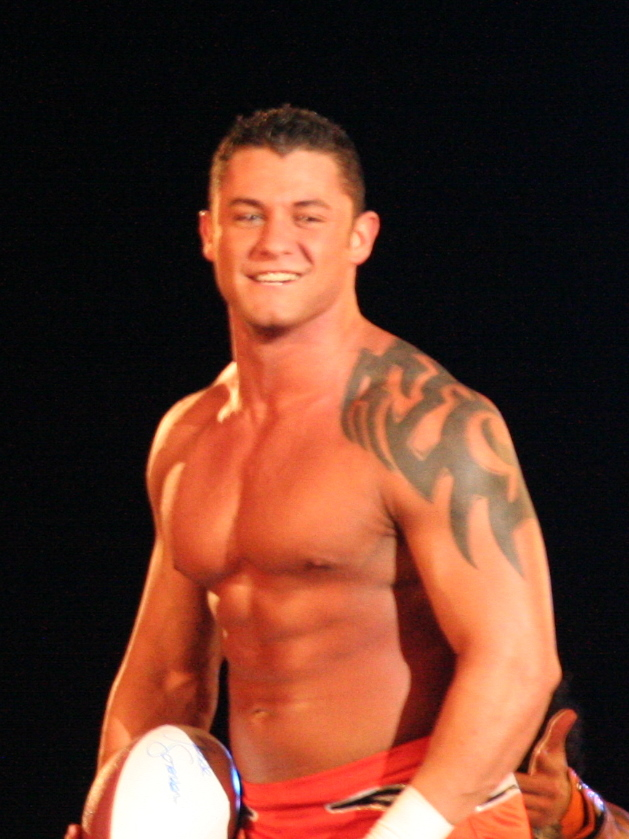
- Sorensen in 2012

Personal information
- Born: Jessy Ryan Sorensen; March 1, 1989 (age 37) Blum, Texas, U.S.

Professional wrestling career
- Ring name(s): Jesse Sorensen; Jessy Sorensen; Ryan Sorensen; Kelly King
- Billed height: 5 ft 10 in (1.78 m)
- Billed weight: 200 lb (91 kg)
- Billed from: Katy, Texas; Houston, Texas (WWE)
- Trained by: Bubba Ray Dudley; D-Von Dudley; Brian Knobbs
- Debut: 2008

Jessy Ryan Sorensen (born April 1, 1989) is an American professional wrestler, who is best known for his time in Total Nonstop Action Wrestling.

He began his career in 2008, but he gained national exposure when he participated in the X Division Showcase, a tournament hosted by TNA featuring X Division wrestlers. After the tournament, Sorensen signed a contract with TNA, but he suffered a neck injury during a match with Zema Ion. Due to the injury, he retired and worked in TNA under a backstage role until he was fired.

Since then, he returned to wrestling and competed on several independent promotions. He also had some matches in WWE and All Elite Wrestling.

== Professional wrestling career ==
=== Early career ===
Throughout 2008, Sorensen competed in various Texas Independent Wrestling Promotions as Ryan Sorensen.

=== Florida Underground Wrestling (2011–2012) ===
Sorensen debuted for Florida Underground Wrestling on March 15, 2011, under the name Ryan Sorensen and lost to Damien Angel. A few days later, he would pick up his first win by defeating Angel in a rematch. In the month of May, Sorensen would have two chances to become a champion, the first of which was a 25-man battle royal for the FUW Heavyweight Championship which would be won by the Cuban Assassin. His second title shot would prove more successful as he defeated D'Lo Jordan to win the vacant FUW Flash Championship, however he would lose it to Romeo Razel only a week later.

Sorenson would go on to form a tag team with Nick Fame called Hunks In Trunks and would defeat Dakota Darsow and Kennedy Kendrick and Biff Slater & Ralph Mosca to become the FUW Tag Team Championship. Hunks In Trunks would eventually lose the championship and subsequently split which led to several matches where the two would trade victories. On February 7, 2012, Sorenson would beat Nick Fame in a no holds barred street fight.

=== Total Nonstop Action Wrestling (2011–2013) ===
Sorensen made his debut for Total Nonstop Action Wrestling (TNA) on the July 7, 2011, edition of Impact Wrestling as part of the X Division Showcase tournament. He was eliminated from the tournament after losing to Jack Evans in a three-way match, which also included Anthony Nese. Sorensen returned to TNA on the August 11 edition of Impact Wrestling, appearing in a backstage segment, where Eric Bischoff introduced new rules to the X Division. On August 18, TNA announced that Sorensen had signed a contract with the promotion. On that evening's episode of Impact Wrestling, he took part in a gauntlet match to determine the X Division rankings. After eliminating Zema Ion, Anthony Nese and Kid Kash from the match, Sorensen was left in the ring with Austin Aries to determine the winner and number one contender. However, Kash interfered in the match by performing a Money Maker on Sorensen, after which Aries pinned him with a brainbuster to win the match. The following week, Kash defeated Sorensen in a singles match with a rollup, while holding his tights. The following week Sorensen pinned Kash in a tag team match, where he teamed with Brian Kendrick and Kash with Austin Aries. On September 11 at No Surrender, Sorensen defeated Kash to become the number one contender to the TNA X Division Championship. Sorensen received his title match on the September 22 edition of Impact Wrestling, but was defeated by champion Austin Aries, following a distraction from Kid Kash. On the November 3 edition of Impact Wrestling, Sorensen pinned Aries in a non-title match, following an inadvertent distraction from Kash. On November 13 at Turning Point, Sorensen failed to capture the X Division Championship from Aries in a three-way match, which also included Kash. On January 8, 2012, at Genesis, Sorensen competed in a four-way elimination match for the X Division Championship, but was defeated by Aries, following interference from Zema Ion, who had already been eliminated from the match.

On February 12 at Against All Odds, Sorensen was defeated by Ion in an X Division number one contender's match via countout, after he suffered a legitimate injury and was unable to continue the match. It was later reported that Sorensen had suffered a C-1 vertebrae fracture with spinal cord edema. Sorensen's doctors estimated that he could need up to one year to fully recover from his injury. Sorensen made an appearance on July 8 at Destination X, addressing his neck injury and saying he hoped Zema Ion would win the vacant X Division Championship, because he plans to take the title from him. Sorensen then made a promise that he will be X Division champion this time next year at Destination X 2013 and that he will cash the title in to become the TNA World Heavyweight Champion. Sorensen ended his appearance by having a staredown with Ion. While recovering from injury, he worked as a marketing/production assistant. On March 18, 2013, Jesse was on the TNA YouTube show The List, hosted by Robbie E & So Cal Val speaking of return questions and flirting with So Cal Val. On May 20, 2013, a fan asked him when he would come back, but Sorensen said that there would not be a comeback, but there would be a new beginning. On June 5, 2013, Sorensen's profile was removed from TNA roster page. On July 23, 2013, Sorensen announced that he had been released from TNA.

=== Independent circuit (2013–present) ===
After his release, fans responded negatively due to TNA President Dixie Carter previously stating that he would always have a job after his neck injury. TNA claimed that Jesse received a lot of money and he didn't want to learn a new job inside the company, because he wanted to wrestle. On July 27, 2013, Sorensen returned to FUW, where he and Nick Fame defeated Angel Santos and MDK when Jesse pinned Santos with a Cobra Clutch Slam. On October 21, 2013, Sorensen made his debut in Ring Warriors, defeating Johnny Armani. On October 26, Sorensen made his debut for Ring of Honor (ROH), losing to Tommaso Ciampa at Glory By Honor XII. In May 2014, Sorensen injured his ankle. On September 15, 2014, Sorensen announced his retirement from wrestling.

Jesse defeated Caleb Konley on April 7, 2015, to become the Paragon Pro Wrestling World Champion in Las Vegas, Nevada. Sorensen is appearing regularly on Paragon's cards.

=== WWE ===
==== NXT (2015–2016) ====
On July 16, 2015, though not signed to WWE, Sorensen made an appearance on a NXT television taping, losing to Baron Corbin. On August 19, he teamed with Aaron Solow, Mr. 450 and Jonny Vandal and competed in an eight-man tag team match against Enzo Amore, Colin Cassady and The Hype Bros (Zack Ryder and Mojo Rawley), losing again. Sorensen made another appearance on the November 25 tapings losing to Apollo Crews. On February 10, 2016, Jesse Sorensen made another appearance on NXT TV, losing to Elias Samson. Sorensen made yet another appearance, in the March 16 tapings, this time losing to Tommaso Ciampa.

== Championships and accomplishments ==
- Florida Underground Wrestling
  - FUW Flash Championship (1 time)
  - FUW Tag Team Championship (1 time) – with Nick Fame
- Paragon Pro Wrestling
  - PPW Championship (1 time)
  - PPW Tag Team Championship (1 time) – with Wes Brisco
