= Austin Aries =

American professional wrestler (born 1978)

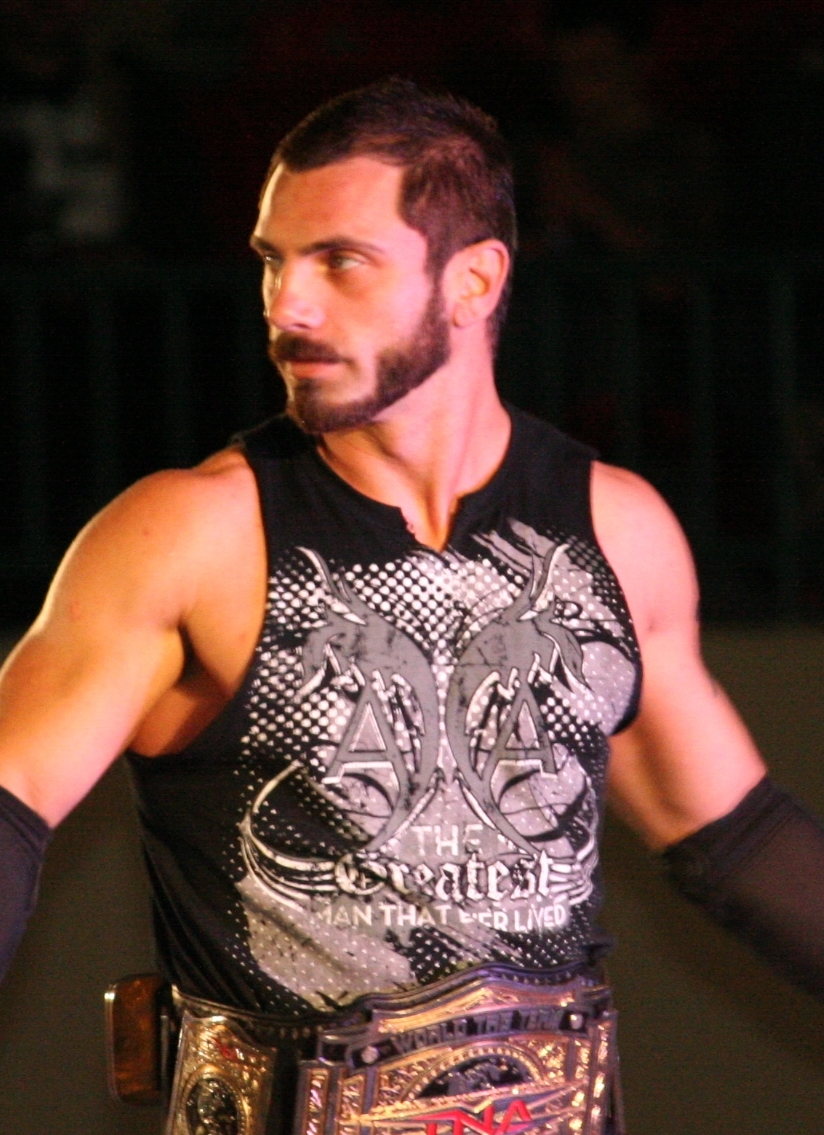
- Solwold in 2013

Personal information
- Born: Daniel Healy Solwold Jr. April 15, 1978 (age 48) Milwaukee, Wisconsin, U.S.

Professional wrestling career
- Ring name(s): Austin Aries; Austin Starr; Dan Sexon
- Billed height: 5 ft 9 in (175 cm)
- Billed weight: 202 lb (92 kg)
- Billed from: Milwaukee, Wisconsin; Savage, Minnesota
- Trained by: Eddie Sharkey; Terry Fox
- Debut: November 11, 2000

Daniel Healy Solwold Jr. (born April 15, 1978), better known by his ring name Austin Aries, is an American professional wrestler. He is signed to Major League Wrestling (MLW). He is known for his time with Total Nonstop Action Wrestling (TNA), Ring of Honor (ROH), and WWE. Between TNA and ROH, Aries has held 14 total championships and has also held numerous international and United States independent championships.

Aries began to work with ROH in 2004, joining the Generation Next faction. He won the ROH World Tag Team Championship with his teammate Roderick Strong, and at Final Battle 2004, ROH's biggest event, defeated Samoa Joe to win the ROH World Championship, ending the latter's 645-day reign. He would regain the title in 2009, becoming the first multi-time champion. After moving on to Total Nonstop Action Wrestling (TNA), Aries won the X Division Championship six times. His first reign is the longest of the title's history at 301 days and created the "Option C" clause, trading the title for a TNA World Heavyweight title opportunity at Destination X, winning the title. He also won the TNA World Tag Team Championship and the Impact Grand Championship, becoming a Grand Slam Champion in Impact Wrestling. After a short hiatus from the wrestling industry from 2019 to 2021, he made appearances for the National Wrestling Alliance from 2021-2022 and has competed on the independent wrestling circuit since.

== Professional wrestling career ==
=== Early career (2000–2004) ===
Solwold began training under Eddie Sharkey and Terry Fox in 2000 and debuted on November 11, 2000 under the ring name "Austin Aries", facing "Sheriff" Johnny Emerald. He wrestled in the midwest for several years before his east coast wrestling career was jumpstarted after he progressed to the finals of the 2004 ECWA Super 8 Tournament, where he was defeated by Christopher Daniels.

=== Ring of Honor (2004–2007) ===
From there, he joined Ring of Honor. Aries made his ROH main show debut at ROH: Reborn Stage 2 on April 24, 2004. Aries was unsuccessful, however, losing a four corner survival match also involving Jimmy Rave, Rocky Romero, and the winner, Nigel McGuinness. Aries was scheduled to return at the show of May 22, Generation Next, to compete in a one night series which would showcase young, upcoming ROH talent. Alex Shelley, however, hand-picked Aries, along with Roderick Strong and Jack Evans, as members of a new stable (also meant to promote young, upcoming ROH talent) who, instead of earning their spots, would simply take them. The group took the name Generation Next as their own.

Aries captured the ROH World Championship at Final Battle 2004 on December 26, 2004, by defeating the longest reigning ROH World Champion Samoa Joe. On June 16, 2005, Ring of Honor named Aries the new head trainer at the ROH wrestling school, replacing the former head trainer, CM Punk, who had agreed to a contract with World Wrestling Entertainment. After a six-month string of non-stop defenses, many of which were international, Aries lost the championship to CM Punk on June 18, 2005.

On December 17 at Final Battle 2005, Aries teamed with Strong to defeat Sal Rinauro and Tony Mamaluke for the ROH World Tag Team Championship. The two then disbanded Generation Next on June 3, 2006. In a first time ever match, Aries took on Pro Wrestling Noah wrestler KENTA on June 24, but was defeated following KENTA's Go 2 Sleep.

On September 16, he and his partner Strong lost the ROH World Tag Team Championship to The Kings of Wrestling (Chris Hero and Claudio Castagnoli). Aries and Strong continued to team together for the rest of the year. At Battle of the Icons on January 27, 2007, Aries and Strong teamed up with Jack Evans to defeat Davey Richards, Delirious and SHINGO. This apparent Generation Next reunion was short lived when, at the following show on February 16, Strong attacked Aries after their tag team title match against Christopher Daniels and Matt Sydal. Strong then formed the "No Remorse Corps" with Davey Richards. Jack Evans ran down and pulled Strong off Aries, but refused to side with either of them. The following night, Aries called out Strong twice, but was unable to get his hands on him. When Evans refused to side with him, Aries said he was going to form a new faction with members of the next generation of wrestling. With that, he formed "The Resilience" with Erick Stevens and Matt Cross.

On April 27, Aries unsuccessfully challenged Takeshi Morishima for the Ring of Honor World Championship. On May 4, 2007, Ring of Honor announced on their website that they had signed a pay-per-view deal with G-Funk Sports and Entertainment. Following the announcement, TNA pulled Aries and Homicide, both under contracts with TNA, from all Ring of Honor shows.

=== Total Nonstop Action Wrestling (2005–2007) ===
In July 2005, Total Nonstop Action Wrestling (TNA) held an Internet poll to select an opponent for the TNA X Division Champion Christopher Daniels at their August 14 pay-per-view, Sacrifice. Billed as an "Internet dream match", the poll offered voters the choice of Aries, Roderick Strong, Jay Lethal and Matt Sydal, none of whom were contracted to TNA or had even appeared with the company on a regular basis in the past. Aries won the poll by a landslide, and thus faced Daniels in a non-title match at Sacrifice, which he lost. Following the event, it was rumored that TNA officials had been impressed by Aries and were considering offering him a contract, and these rumors were seemingly substantiated when Aries faced and defeated Roderick Strong at Unbreakable on September 11 in a "showcase match".

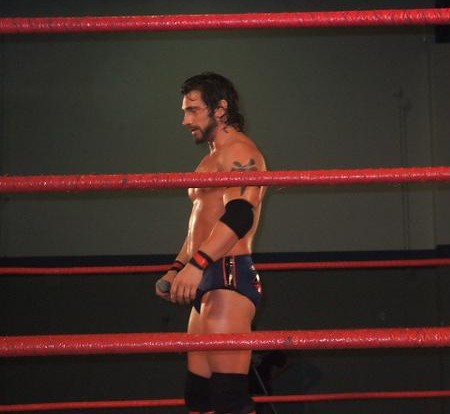
Aries in the ring in 2006

On September 22, 2005, Aries announced on his website that he had received a contract offer from TNA, and intended to sign it. He became a regular member of the TNA roster, and formed a stable with Roderick Strong and Alex Shelley. Many fans referred to this group as the second coming of Generation Next, which had contained Shelley, Strong, Aries, and Jack Evans in Ring of Honor.

In February 2006, he and Strong were both suspended for two months for arriving four hours late for the pay-per-view Against All Odds. This occurred because of Aries and Strong's decision to remain in Long Island for an ROH show, despite TNA's last minute request to travel to Florida because of the potential of a snowstorm.

In the build-up to Bound for Glory, promos began to air advertising the debut of a new wrestler, Austin Starr, at the event with the slogan "A Starr is Born". Starr appeared for TNA on October 22 as the first entrant and became the winner of the "Kevin Nash Open Invitational X Division Gauntlet Battle Royal" at Bound for Glory. After the match, Kevin Nash presented Starr with a bowling trophy and a hug.

On the following episode of Impact!, it was announced that Starr would work closely with Nash's group Paparazzi Productions, much to the dismay of one of the group's founders, Alex Shelley. Starr replaced Johnny Devine as a member of Paparazzi Productions and participated in the Paparazzi Championship Series along with Shelley, eventually losing to Shelley in the finals at Final Resolution 2007. Starr then went on to feud with Senshi.

On April 18, 2007, Starr was suspended for ninety days. On May 7 it was reported by the Wrestling Observer Newsletter that the suspension stemmed from TNA asking Austin to tape promo vignettes on a day he believed to be his day off. Starr did ultimately agree to do the vignettes but TNA saw this as a bad attitude and was reason for his suspension. During the suspension, Aries requested, and was granted, his release from TNA.

=== Return to ROH (2007–2010) ===
One month after being granted his release from TNA, Aries made his return to Ring of Honor. At United We Stand on June 22, 2007, Aries was in attendance, but as a "fan". During a match between the No Remorse Corps and The Resilience, he was verbally called out by Roderick Strong. Aries tried to climb over the guard rail, but was held back by security as he was no longer employed by the company. The following night, at Driven, Aries was again in attendance. Following a six-man tag team match between the No Remorse Corps and Delirious and The Resilience, Aries ran through the crowd and attacked the NRC. He then signed an ROH contract in the ring.

Aries' first match back came at Race to the Top Tournament: Night One, when he faced Roderick Strong, Jimmy Rave and Gran Akuma in a Four Way Fray for the FIP World Heavyweight Championship. The feud between The Resilience and the No Remorse Corps continued at ROH's Death before Dishonor V weekend. The first night, Aries teamed with Erick Stevens to defeat Roderick Strong and Rocky Romero. However, they were not as lucky the following night, when they, along with Delirious, lost in a Street Fight to the No Remorse Corps and Matt Sydal.

At Manhattan Mayhem II, Aries defeated former Generation Next stable mates Roderick Strong and Jack Evans in a triple threat match. At Glory by Honor VI: Night Two, Aries disbanded The Resilience in order to focus on regaining the ROH World Championship. At Rising Above, Aries faced current ROH champion Nigel McGuinness in a losing effort in an attempt to regain the ROH World Championship.

Aries began to act frustrated due to losing matches and began refusing to shake hands after matches. Jimmy Jacobs displayed interest in adding Aries to The Age of the Fall (AotF). Tammy Sytch also offered Aries her managerial services. Aries was defeated by McGuinness a second time at Supercard of Honor III in March 2008. Afterwards, Aries left with Lacey, seemingly joining the AotF. Aries returned in April and revealed that Lacey had decided to leave the AotF and that he and Lacey had become a couple. This outraged Jacobs, who attacked Aries and started a feud with him. Shortly afterwards, Lacey was apparently attacked by Jacobs outside a gym.

On April 23, Aries was chosen by Jay Briscoe as his replacement for brother Mark Briscoe as to defend the ROH World Tag Team Championship against The Age of the Fall after Mark was forced out of action due to an injury. The reasoning for this choice was Aries and the Briscoe Brothers' shared hatred for the Age of the Fall. Aries was not considered to have won the championship a second time, but rather to have been a substitute in a title defense. After their first and only title defense, the championship was vacated.

On June 6 Aries teamed with Bryan Danielson in Ring of Honor's one night tournament to crown new World Tag Team Champions. They defeated Roderick Strong and Davey Richards in the first round before being eliminated in the second by eventual winners Jimmy Jacobs and Tyler Black. On June 7 Aries and Danielson received a title shot against Jacobs and Black but were defeated when Black pinned Danielson with a Phoenix Splash.

On June 27, Aries was defeated by Necro Butcher in a "Relaxed Rules" match following a chair shot to the head. Aries had unsuccessfully attempted to get Butcher to leave the Age of The Fall and when Necro refused, he ceased fighting back against him. On June 28, Aries pinned ROH World Tag Team Champion Jimmy Jacobs in a "Relaxed Rules" match following a 450° splash despite interference from Necro Butcher, Tyler Black, Allison Wonderland, and MsChif. On July 25, Aries and Jay Briscoe teamed to defeat ROH World Tag Team Champions The Age of The Fall (Jimmy Jacobs and Tyler Black) in a No DQ Match when Briscoe pinned Black. On July 26, in Detroit, Aries spent much of the show brawling with Jimmy Jacobs culminating in both men brawling at the top of a 20-foot ladder. Jacobs' partner in the Age of The Fall, Necro Butcher, eventually tipped the ladder over sending them both crashing through a table below.

Aries continued his feud with Jimmy Jacobs throughout the fall. In the second Steel Cage Warfare Match at Glory by Honor VII, Aries' team (Aries, Briscoe Brothers) defeated Jacobs' team (Jacobs, Black, Delirious) and Necro's team (himself only). The two had a best of three series to somewhat put an end to the feud. The first match took place at Ring of Homicide 2, where Jacobs (with help from Delirious and Brodie Lee) defeated Aries in a Falls Count Anywhere Match. The second match took place at Bound By Hate, and Aries defeated the bloody Jacobs in a Dog Collar Match. The deciding match was at Rising Above 2009 in an "I Quit" Match. Lacey returned to ROH in Aries' corner, and Aries won the match. Aries continued his feud with the Age of the Fall this time against the heavily cheered Tyler Black. At Final Battle 2008, Black was defeated by Aries in a Number One Contender's Match. After the match Jacobs attacked Black, and Aries ran in to make the save. Instead, however, Aries teamed up with Jacobs to attack Black. Aries later explained that the reason that he attacked Black was because the fans turned on him.

In addition to his work in ROH, Aries was announced as a member of Team Epic War for Chikara's King of Trios 2009 tournament. On the first night, Aries, along with Ryan Drago and Tony Kozina, lost to the F1rst Family (Arik Cannon, Darin Corbin and Ryan Cruz) in the first round. On the second night, Aries lost to Player Dos in the Rey de Voladores opening four corners match. On the final night, Aries lost to Eddie Kingston in a singles match.

In early 2009, Aries also underwent a complete character transformation, cutting his long hair, donning new pink and black trunks, and coming to the ring in a bright pink fur jacket. He dropped his darker persona and adapted to a new ladies man gimmick, often referring to himself as "A Double" and "The Greatest Man That Ever Lived", the latter after a song by Weezer, which also became his new entrance theme.

On June 13, 2009, at Manhattan Mayhem III, Aries won a three-way elimination match against the ROH World Champion Jerry Lynn and Tyler Black, to become the first person to have held the ROH World Championship on more than one occasion. On December 19, 2009, at Final Battle 2009, ROH's first live pay-per-view, he defended the title by wrestling Tyler Black to a 60-minute time limit draw. On February 13, 2010, at the main event of ROH's 8th Anniversary Show, Aries lost the ROH World Championship to Tyler Black. During the following months he feuded with Delirious and Jerry Lynn, while also becoming the manager of Rhett Titus and Kenny King, the tag team known collectively as the All Night Express, dubbing himself the "Greatest Manager That Ever Lived". In October 2010 Aries' profile was removed from ROH's official website, after reports had surfaced that the promotion was going to be cutting down the size of their roster. On October 6, 2010, competing promotion Evolve announced that Aries would make his debut for the promotion on November 20.

=== Dragon Gate USA (2010–2011) ===
On October 12, 2010, Dragon Gate USA announced that Aries had signed a contract with the promotion. Aries made his debut for the promotion on October 29 at the Bushido: Code of the Warrior pay-per-view, where he was defeated by Open the Dream Gate Champion Masato Yoshino in a non–title match. After the match, Rich Swann, whom Aries had offered to adopt as his protégé, turned his offer down. On January 28, 2011, at United: NYC, Aries defeated Swann in a singles match. The following month Aries started a storyline, where he claimed to have lost the motivation to continue his professional wrestling career, after failing to make the cast of WWE Tough Enough, before offering to put his Dragon Gate USA career on the line in order to get one last shot at Yamato and the Open the Freedom Gate Championship. On April 2 at Mercury Rising 2011, Aries was unsuccessful in his challenge, thus seemingly bringing his Dragon Gate USA career to an end. The following day at Open the Ultimate Gate, Aries was defeated by Jimmy Jacobs in what was billed as his Dragon Gate USA farewell match. However, after the match Aries feigned passing the torch to Chuck Taylor, Johnny Gargano and Rich Swann, the trio known collectively as Ronin, before turning on them and joining the promotion's top heel group, Blood Warriors, claiming to have found his purpose under the leadership of CIMA. Blood Warriors and Ronin faced each other in a six-man elimination tag team match on June 5 at Enter The Dragon 2011, which Ronin won after Johnny Gargano managed to submit the Gargano Escape on both CIMA and Aries.

On June 9, 2011, it was reported that Aries had left both Dragon Gate USA and Evolve to reportedly pursue a career outside of professional wrestling. Aries later revealed that he considered retiring from professional wrestling because he "didn't want to be Randy the Ram in 10, 20 years." However, he decided to continue wrestling after receiving an offer from Total Nonstop Action Wrestling, to be a part of the X-Division Showcase.

=== Return to TNA (2011–2015) ===
==== X Division Champion (2011–2012) ====
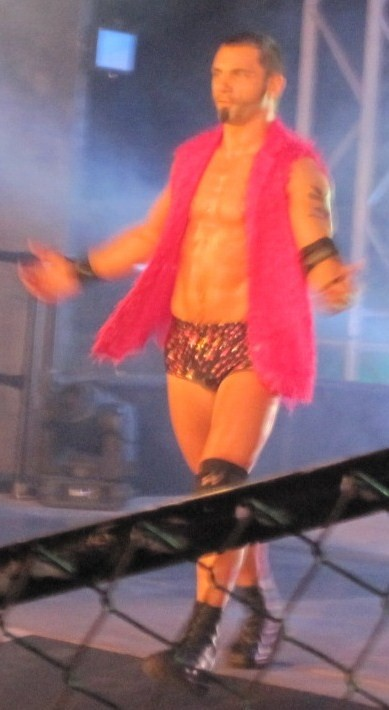
Aries making his return to TNA in June 2011

On June 13, 2011, at the tapings of the June 16 episode of Impact Wrestling, Aries made a return to TNA, defeating Jimmy Rave and Kid Kash in a first round match of the X Division Showcase tournament for a contract with the promotion. On July 10 at Destination X, Aries defeated Jack Evans, Low Ki and Zema Ion to win the tournament and earn a contract with TNA. In his first match on Impact since being officially re-signed, Aries defeated Shannon Moore in a singles match, after hitting him with a steel chain and then pinning him for the victory, thus returning to his A Double character and establishing himself as a heel. On the July 21 episode of Impact Wrestling, Aries cost Alex Shelley, who had previously confronted him on his win over Shannon Moore, his shot at the TNA X Division Championship. Two weeks later, Aries defeated Shelley in a singles match. On August 7 at Hardcore Justice, Aries and Shelley competed in a three-way match for the TNA X Division Championship, but were both unable to win the belt from the defending champion, Brian Kendrick.

On the August 18 episode of Impact Wrestling Aries won an eight-man gauntlet match to earn another shot at the X Division Championship. On September 11 at No Surrender, Aries defeated Kendrick to win the X Division Championship for the first time. On October 16 at Bound for Glory, Aries defeated Kendrick in a rematch to retain the title. On November 13 at Turning Point, Aries defeated Jesse Sorensen and Kid Kash in a three-way match to retain the X Division Championship. On December 11 at Final Resolution, Aries defeated Kash in a singles match to retain the X Division Championship. On January 8, 2012, at Genesis, Aries successfully defended the X Division Championship in a four-way elimination match against Jesse Sorensen, Kid Kash and Zema Ion. On February 12 at Against All Odds, Aries defeated Alex Shelley with his Last Chancery submission hold to retain the X Division Championship. On the March 8 episode of Impact Wrestling, Aries was defeated by Ion via disqualification, after Aries was caught using Ion's hair spray on him; as a result, Aries retained his title. On March 12, Aries became the longest reigning TNA X Division Champion in history by breaking the previous record of 182 days, set by Christopher Daniels in 2005. On March 18 at Victory Road, Aries successfully defended the title against Zema Ion. On the following episode of Impact Wrestling, Aries again retained the title after he wrestled Ion, Kid Kash and Anthony Neese to a no contest, following interference from Bully Ray. Aries turned face the following week, when he teamed with James Storm to defeat Ray and Bobby Roode in the main event. The rivalry between Aries and Ray continued on April 15 at Lockdown, where the two were on opposing teams in the annual Lethal Lockdown match. Aries' team, led by Garett Bischoff, ended up defeating Ray's team, led by Eric Bischoff. Aries continued his record-breaking title reign on the May 10 episode of Impact by successfully defending the X Division Championship against Zema Ion. Three days later at Sacrifice, Aries defeated Bully Ray in a singles match, submitting him with the Last Chancery. On May 19, Aries announced that he had signed a contract extension with TNA. On the live May 31 episode of Impact Wrestling, Aries successfully defended the X Division Championship against Chris Sabin. Earlier in the episode, Aries had a run-in with Samoa Joe, which led to Joe costing Aries his match with Crimson the following week. On June 10 at Slammiversary, Aries defeated Joe to retain the X Division Championship. On the following episode of Impact Wrestling, Aries competed in his first Ultimate X match, where he successfully defended the X Division Championship against Chris Sabin and Zema Ion.

==== TNA World Heavyweight Champion (2012–2013) ====
Following his win, Aries announced that he was not satisfied with being just the X Division Champion, which led to General Manager Hulk Hogan promising him a shot at the TNA World Heavyweight Championship, but only if he first vacated the X Division Championship. The following week, Aries agreed to Hogan's terms with the caveat that every year before the annual Destination X pay-per-view, future X Division Champions be given the same opportunity. Aries relinquished the X Division Championship two weeks later, ending his record-breaking reign at 301 days. On July 8 at Destination X, Aries defeated Bobby Roode in the main event to win the TNA World Heavyweight Championship. On July 17, TNA president Dixie Carter announced that Aries had signed a new long-term deal with the promotion. Aries and Roode had a non-title rematch on the July 19 episode of Impact Wrestling, which ended in a no contest, when both competitors were attacked by a group of masked assailants, known only as the "Aces & Eights". On August 12 at Hardcore Justice, Aries successfully defended the TNA World Heavyweight Championship against Roode, with a pre-match stipulation preventing Roode from getting another rematch for the title as long as Aries was champion. During the following weeks, Aries moved from Roode to defending TNA against the Aces & Eights. On the September 20 episode of Impact Wrestling, after Jeff Hardy had won the 2012 Bound for Glory Series to become Aries' next challenger for the TNA World Heavyweight Championship, Aries began working as a tweener, claiming that he could match anything Hardy had ever done in his career. On October 11, during the final episode of Impact Wrestling before Bound for Glory, Aries claimed that he worked best when people were against him, before crotching Hardy on the ring ropes and dropping him with a brainbuster, turning heel once again. Three days later in the main event of Bound for Glory, TNA's largest annual event, Aries lost the TNA World Heavyweight Championship to Hardy, ending his reign at 98 days.

On the October 25 episode of Impact Wrestling, Aries attacked Hardy, after he had successfully defended his title against Kurt Angle, stealing one of his two title belts and announcing that a rematch between the two would take place at Turning Point. On November 11 at Turning Point, Aries failed to regain the TNA World Heavyweight Championship from Hardy in a ladder match. On the November 22 episode of Impact Wrestling, Aries moved from Hardy to becoming a disruption around the Impact Zone by revealing a secret relationship between Bully Ray and General Manager Hulk Hogan's daughter Brooke. The following week, Aries was chosen by Hogan as the number one contender to Rob Van Dam's X Division Championship. Aries defeated Van Dam in the main event via disqualification, following interference from Bully Ray, but as the title does not change hands on a disqualification, Van Dam retained. On December 9 at Final Resolution, Aries defeated Ray in a singles match, following a distraction from both Brooke and Hulk Hogan and a low blow from Aries. On the December 13 episode of Impact Wrestling, Aries was revealed as the man who paid the Aces & Eights to prevent Bobby Roode, who originally paid the group to help him win the TNA World Heavyweight Championship, from winning at the pay-per-view, which led Jeff Hardy to issue him a title challenge. On the December 20 episode of Impact Wrestling, Aries was unsuccessful in his challenge for Hardy's TNA World Heavyweight Championship, following interference from Bobby Roode. Aries and Roode faced off in a number one contenders match on the December 27 episode of Impact Wrestling. The match ended in a no contest after the two attacked referee Earl Hebner and then were, in turn attacked by Hardy. The rivalry culminated in a three-way elimination match on January 13, 2013, at Genesis, where Aries failed again to regain the TNA World Heavyweight Championship from Hardy.

==== Championship pursuits and reigns (2013–2015) ====
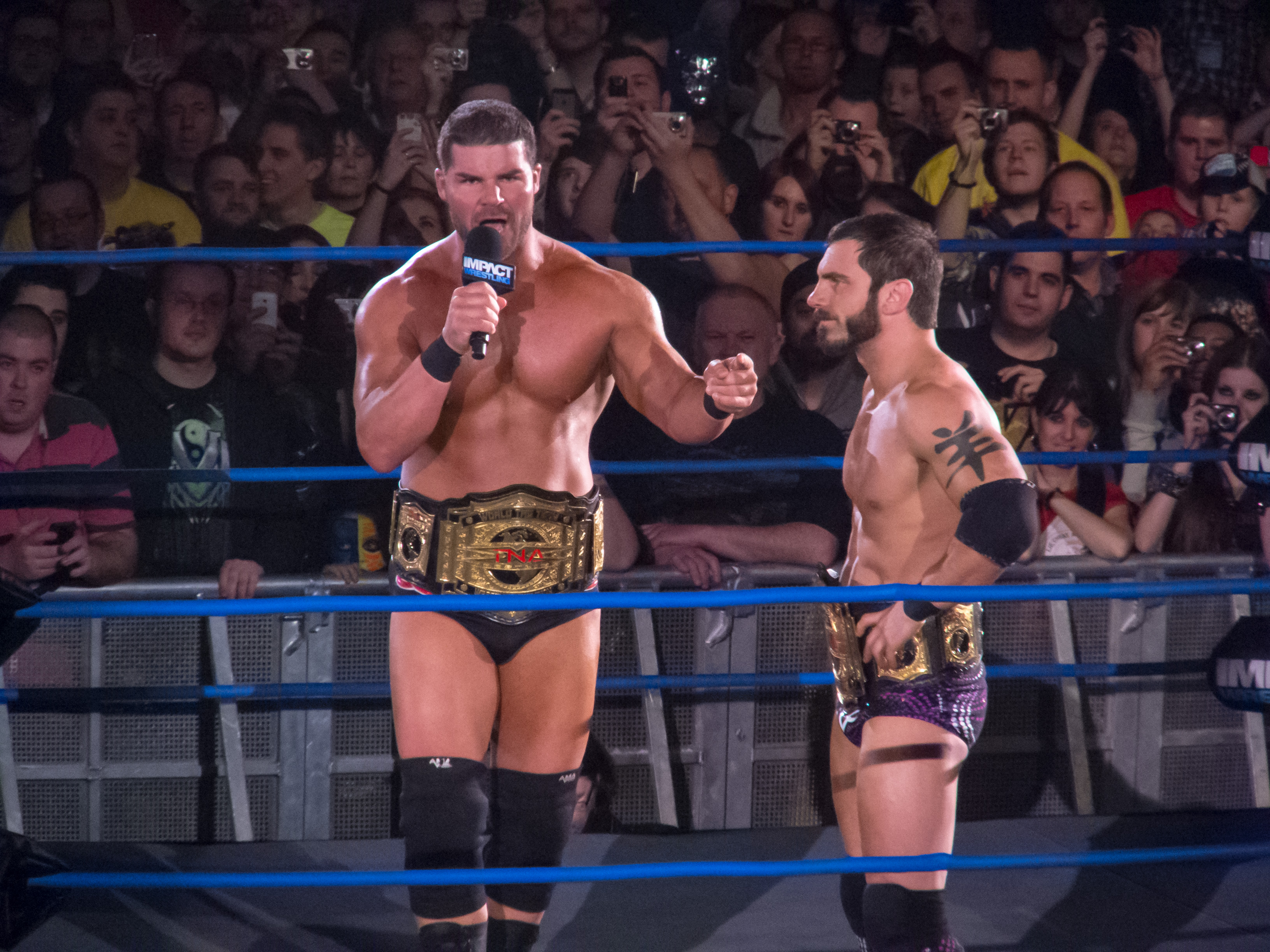
Aries (right) and Bobby Roode as the TNA World Tag Team Champions

On January 25, at the tapings of the February 7 episode of Impact in Manchester, England, Roode and Aries defeated Chavo Guerrero Jr. and Hernandez to win the TNA World Tag Team Championship, thus giving Aries the TNA Triple Crown. Roode and Aries made their first successful title defense on March 10 at Lockdown, defeating Bad Influence (Christopher Daniels and Kazarian) and Chavo Guerrero Jr. and Hernandez in a three-way match. On the March 21 episode of Impact Wrestling, Aries and Roode defeated Guerrero and Hernandez to retain the TNA World Tag Team Championship, following interference from Daniels and Kazarian. Afterwards, the champions were attacked by Daniels and Kazarian. On the April 11 episode of Impact Wrestling, Roode and Aries lost the TNA World Tag Team Championship back to Guerrero and Hernandez in a Two-out-of-Three Falls match, ending their reign at 76 days. Aries and Roode received their rematch on the April 25 episode of Impact Wrestling, but were again defeated by Guerrero and Hernandez after an inadvertent interference from Christopher Daniels and Kazarian. Aries and Roode faced Daniels and Kazarian in number one contenders match on the May 9 episode of Impact Wrestling, however, the match ended in a no contest after special guest referee James Storm superkicked Aries and Daniels and walked out on the match. Aries and Roode received another shot at Guerrero and Hernandez's titles on June 2 at Slammiversary XI, in a fatal four-way elimination match, which was won by Gunner and James Storm.

On the June 13 episode of Impact Wrestling, Aries defeated Eric Young to qualify for the 2013 Bound for Glory Series. The following week, Aries defeated Jay Bradley in his first BFG series match via pinfall to earn seven points in the tournament. On the June 27 episode of Impact Wrestling, Aries disguised himself as Suicide and defeated Chris Sabin and Kenny King to win his second X Division Championship. Aries unmasked himself at the end of the show, after Hulk Hogan discovered the real Suicide and demanded the fake Suicide to unmask, and announced that he intended to trade in the X Division Championship for a World Heavyweight Championship match at Destination X. The following week, however, Aries lost the X Division Championship back to Sabin in a three-way match, which also included the real Suicide, now known as Manik. On the August 1 episode of Impact Wrestling, Aries turned face once again after praising AJ Styles, before being interrupted by his former tag team partner Bobby Rhode. Aries also competed in the Bound for Glory Series before being eliminated by Styles on September 12 at the Impact Wrestling: No Surrender event.

On October 20 at the Bound for Glory pay-per-view, Aries competed in an Ultimate X match for the X Division Championship but the match was won by Chris Sabin. On the December 12 episode of Impact Wrestling, Aries defeated Sabin to win the X-Division Championship for a third time. On the January 2, 2014, episode of Impact Wrestling, Aries lost the X Division Championship back to Sabin. Three weeks later, on the January 23 special episode of Impact Wrestling:Genesis, Aries once again defeated Sabin to win the TNA X Division Championship for the fourth time. On the February 6 episode of Impact Wrestling, Aries successfully defended his X Division Championship against Zema Ion, who cashed in his Feast or Fired briefcase.

Three weeks later, on the February 27 episode of Impact Wrestling, served as the special guest referee in a match between Bobby Roode and MVP. Aries attacked MVP, allowing Roode to win the match, turning heel once again. On March 2, Aries lost the X Division Championship to Seiya Sanada at Wrestle-1's Kaisen: Outbreak event in Tokyo, Japan. On the May 22 episode of Impact Wrestling, Aries helped Eric Young against MVP, Lashley, and Kenny King but was attacked by the trio, turning face once again. On June 15, 2014, at Slammiversary, Aries defeated Kenny King in a match to determine which one would face TNA World Heavyweight Champion Eric Young in a title match. Later that night, Aries lost to Young.

At the June 20 Impact Wrestling taping, Aries won back the X Division Championship from Sanada for his fifth reign. A mere five days after regaining the championship, Aries chose to invoke "Option C" to vacate the championship for a title shot at the TNA World Heavyweight Championship at Destination X on June 26, where he lost to the champion Lashley. Then, Aries entered in a short feud against James Storm and his new apprentice The Great Sanada, when Aries was defeated by him on the August 27 episode of Impact Wrestling. Aries suffered a loss once again against the duo in a tag-team match, teaming with Tajiri on the September 10 episode of Impact Wrestling. Three weeks later, Aries challenged Samoa Joe for his TNA X Division Championship, but was ultimately defeated. On January 7, 2015, Aries defeated Low Ki to regain the X Division Championship for the sixth time. Low Ki recaptured the title during the January 16 Impact episode after interference from The Beat Down Clan.

During the January 23 Impact Wrestling episode, Aries won the annual Feast or Fired, affording him an opportunity at the TNA World Heavyweight Championship. Throughout February and March, Aries continued to feud with the Beat Down Clan with Low Ki stealing Aries' briefcase after a match with Samoa Joe, with Aries eventually taking it back. At Lockdown, Aries took part in the annual Lethal Lockdown match with Team Kurt Angle, defeating The Beat Down Clan. Aries also reformed the Dirty Heels with Bobby Roode, with the two challenging The Wolves to a best of 5 series for the Tag Team Titles. The Wolves won the first two matches and Aries and Roode won the third. At Destination X, Aries cashed in his Feast or Fired briefcase for an opportunity at the TNA World Heavyweight Championship on Kurt Angle, however Angle retained the championship. After defeating the Wolves in the fourth match of the series, which was a Full Metal Mayhem match, Aries defeated Davey Richards at Slammiversary XIII to have the option to choose the stipulation for the final match in the series. Aries and Roode chose an Iron Man tag team match, which they ultimately lost on the Bell to Bell special edition of Impact. On the August 5 episode of Impact Wrestling (taped before his release), Aries asked for a title shot, General Manager Bully Ray scheduled Aries against Rockstar Spud after Aries turned heel and ripped on Spud and the whole X Division. After Aries lost the match, he was forced to leave TNA. Afterwards, Aries's heel turn was short lived after Aries showed respect to Rockstar Spud by handing Spud his bow tie and raised his hand, turning Aries face in the process. On June 28, 2015, Aries left TNA as his contract with the company expired.

During a select number of episodes of Impact Wrestling in October and November (taped in July), Aries was put into the TNA World Title Series for the vacant TNA World Heavyweight Championship, scoring 4 points in the tournament, but he finished in third for his block, thus failing to advance through the qualifying round of 16.

=== Later ROH stints (2015, 2018) ===
On July 6, 2015, Ring of Honor announced the return of Aries. Aries was then announced as the replacement for Roderick Strong in the Vegas Wild Card six-man tag match on July 17 alongside Moose and ROH World and Television Champion Jay Lethal against Jay Briscoe, Dalton Castle and Kyle O'Reilly.

On March 9, 2018, Aries returned to Ring of Honor (ROH) for the third time at ROH's 16th Anniversary pay-per-view, where he originally challenged Kenny King to a match for King's ROH World Television Championship at a later date, the only ROH singles title Aries has yet to win. On May 13 on the ROH/NJPW War of the Worlds Tour, Aries challenged Silas Young, who won the World Television Championship at Supercard of Honor XII, for the title in a match that Young won by disqualification when King hit him with the title. After the match, Aries attacked Todd Sinclar and King, turning heel.

=== WWE (2016–2017) ===
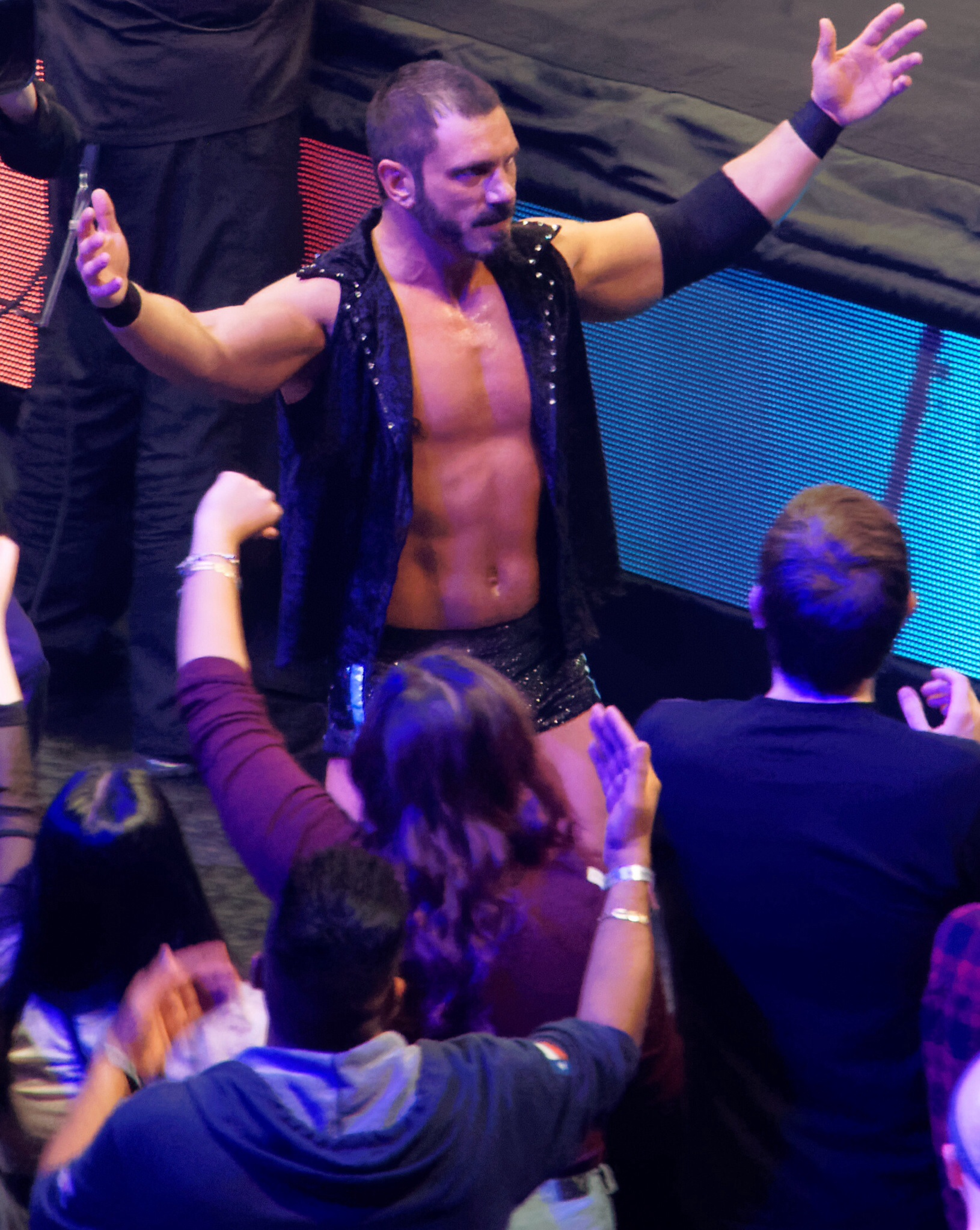
Aries making his entrance at NXT TakeOver: Dallas

On January 22, 2016, WWE announced that Aries would be joining their NXT brand. On the March 2 episode of NXT, he made his debut as a face. He was introduced by general manager William Regal before being attacked by Baron Corbin. A match was booked between the two at NXT TakeOver: Dallas on April 1, where Aries defeated Corbin. On the May 18 episode of NXT, Aries teamed with Shinsuke Nakamura to defeat the team of Blake and Murphy. On the May 25 episode of NXT, Aries declared his intention to become the next NXT Champion, which prompted a response from Nakamura. Regal scheduled a match between the two at NXT TakeOver: The End on June 8, which Nakamura won. On the June 22 episode of NXT, Aries came out to seemingly thank No Way José for reminding him that wrestling was about having fun, only to attack him after an impromptu dance party, turning heel in the process. Aries defeated No Way José by submission at NXT TakeOver: Brooklyn II. Aries and Roderick Strong entered the second Dusty Rhodes Tag Team Classic tournament. They defeated Tucker Knight and Otis Dozovic in the first round, and were scheduled to face TM-61 in the second. However, Aries withdrew from the tournament due to injury. Strong faced Shane Thorne in a singles match instead, but was defeated.

On October 27, Aries suffered a large orbital socket injury during a live event in Fresno, California, during a match against Nakamura and was expected to be injured until early 2017. It was revealed in November 2016 that permanent titanium plates were inserted to repair the injury.

On December 18 at Roadblock: End of the Line, Aries made his WWE pay-per-view debut alongside Michael Cole and Corey Graves. He called the triple threat match between Rich Swann, T. J. Perkins and The Brian Kendrick. The following night on Raw, Aries provided commentary during the cruiserweight match. Aries also provided commentary alongside Graves and Mauro Ranallo on 205 Live, as well as Main Event.

On the March 6, 2017, episode of Raw, during an in-ring interview with WWE Cruiserweight Champion Neville, Aries turned face by attacking Neville after being verbally insulted by the champion. On March 7, he made his 205 Live in-ring debut, defeating Tony Nese. On March 13, Aries defeated Ariya Daivari on his Raw in-ring debut. On the March 14 episode of 205 Live, Aries defeated T. J. Perkins, Akira Tozawa, The Brian Kendrick and Tony Nese in an elimination match to become the number one contender for the Cruiserweight Championship at WrestleMania 33, last eliminating Kendrick to win. However, Aries lost to Neville during the pre-show in the opening match. On the April 4 episode of 205 Live, Aries defeated Perkins, Jack Gallagher and Mustafa Ali in a fatal four-way match to earn a rematch against Neville at Payback, which he won by disqualification. Aries again failed to win the Cruiserweight Championship after he was defeated by Neville at Extreme Rules in a submission match.

On July 7, 2017, Aries was released from his WWE contract. Initial reports stated that Aries was frustrated with his role in the company and asked to be let out of his contract, but Dave Meltzer stated that Aries apparently did not ask for his release and was said to be incredibly unpopular with WWE's writing staff and others backstage. In a 2019 interview, Aries confirmed that he did not ask for his release and was let go from his contract as the WWE writing staff "didn't have anything" for him.

=== Second return to Impact Wrestling (2018) ===
In early 2018, Aries made his official return to TNA, now known as Impact Wrestling, calling himself the "Belt Collector", displaying all of the championships he was holding in various other promotions. He then defeated Eli Drake to win the Impact World Championship. Aries also won the Impact Grand Championship, defeating Matt Sydal, a few days later in a Winner Take All match, which at that point made him an Impact Wrestling Grand Slam winner, a double champion within Impact Wrestling, and at one point being a sextuple champion overall with six titles between five companies based in three different continents (North America, Europe, and Australia). After feuding with Eli Drake and Matt Sydal, Austin Aries began a feud with Alberto El Patron for the Impact World Championship. Set to fight for the World Title at Impact's newest event, Redemption, Alberto El Patron was released from his contract by Impact Wrestling after no showing an event at Wrestlecon. The main event of Redemption was now a triple threat match, pitting Austin Aries against Lucha Underground's Fénix and Pentagón Jr. Pentagón Jr. walked out as the new Impact World Champion.

On the May 31 Under Pressure themed Impact, which was taped on April 24, Aries turned heel for the first time since 2016 when he used a low blow to defeat Pentagon Jr. to win the Impact World Title for a third time. Aries subsequently formally unified the Grand and World championships at a press conference on June 4, 2018. At Slammiversary XVI, Aries successfully retained his title against Moose. Aries's next championship defense came on Impact's August 9 edition, defeating Eddie Edwards with the help of Killer Kross, whom the champion would announce as his "insurance policy" the following week. The heel duo were joined by Moose after the latter betrayed Edwards during a tag team match on the August 30 airing of Impact.

Aries' next title defense would come against Johnny Impact, at Bound for Glory on October 14. As the PPV moved closer, the feud started to blur the lines between a work (something scripted) and shoot (something real), beginning with the two wrestlers trading insults on Twitter that they appeared to take personally, with Aries later deleting many of his tweets. Specifically, Johnny Impact mocked Aries' short stature and the champion responded by making fun of the weight of Johnny Impact's wife, Taya Valkyrie. Both wrestlers alleged in the media that they authentically took issue with the comments. TMZ Live also pushed the angle "like [it] was a shoot". The two wrestlers got in a brawl the night before Bound for Glory during Abyss's Impact Hall of Fame induction.

Aries would drop the title to Johnny Impact the following night, but Aries seemingly no-sold the finish, as he got up quickly after getting pinned, yelled at commentator/executive Don Callis and left the ring while flipping off the crowd, Johnny Impact, and Callis. Kross and Moose, who were both at ringside during the match, and Johnny Impact all looked to be confused with Aries' actions, and the new champion also appeared to mouth "are you kidding me?". Reports later attributed Aries getting up so fast following the finish of the match to a concussion Aries suffered during the match. Impact Wrestling producer Petey Williams stated that Bound For Glory was the last date on Aries contract. Aries was present at the first day of television tapings for Impact on October 8, but was "sent home" and scripts had to be rewritten for the show. Dave Meltzer later reported that both Johnny Impact and Aries started an online feud without management's permission.

=== Independent circuit (2017–2019, 2022–present) ===
After his release from the WWE and his 90-day non-compete clause expired, Aries made a surprise return to Impact Pro Wrestling providing commentary during their event and promoting his book on November 4, 2017. Then on November 18, Aries returned to House of Hardcore 35 where he was promoting his book and calling himself The Truth. On December 2, House of Hardcore 36: Blizzard Brawl Homecoming, Aries defeated Joey Mercury in his House Of Hardcore in ring return. On April 13, 2018, Aries wrestled on a card for the Seattle based independent promotion DEFY Wrestling, and won that company's championship. On August 17, 2018, Aries appeared on House of Glory's "High Intensity 7" show and successfully defended the Impact World Championship in an open challenge against Ken Broadway.

In August 2018 Aries appeared on Ring Warriors television tapings for WGN America. It was reported that he signed on to wrestle for Ring Warriors and be involved behind the scenes in a creative aspect. Their television program debuted on September 15, 2018. He went on to wrestle on five episodes of their first season. The first two appearances he successfully defended the Impact World Heavyweight Championship on the program. Aries first match of 2019 occurred at Warrior Wrestling 3, where Aries lost a street fight to Eddie Edwards. On March 15, 2019, Aries returned to Warrior Wrestling at Warrior Wrestling 4 to face Eddie Edwards in a rematch. Following that match ending in a disqualification, a steel cage match was booked for Warrior Wrestling 5 between the two competitors.

=== International promotions (2017-2019) ===
Aries debuted at World Series Wrestling (WSW) Australia's tour in 2017. Aries wrestled against Ricochet and Brian Cage for the WSW championship at Adelaide's show, however he fell short on capturing the title. He won the title at Sydney's show where he defeated Ricochet after an interference from Brian Cage. On December 4, 2017, Aries appeared on a show for the UK-based Defiant Wrestling promotion. The following day, Aries defeated Marty Scurll to win the Defiant Championship. Months later, at No Regrets 2018, Aries lost the title to Rampage, in his final match for Defiant. On December 17, 2017, Austin Aries defeated Mark Haskins at IPW:UK The Big Bang: Undisputed to win the IPW:UK World Championship. In June 2018 Aries returned to WSW for another tour. On the June 24 show, Aries defeated Johnny Impact to win their WSW Heavyweight Championship. He then returned to WSW in November 2018, where he lost the WSW Heavyweight Championship to Robbie Eagles on November 26. In March 2019, he completed another tour with WSW, wrestling Abyss in a Monster's Ball match and unsuccessfully challenging Robbie Eagles for the WSW Heavyweight Championship.

=== Major League Wrestling (2018–2019) ===
On February 8, 2018, Aries debuted for Major League Wrestling (MLW) at their Road to the World Championship event, after being backstage at their two previous events. At the show he defeated A. C. H., taking a microphone after the bout announcing his intention of becoming the MLW World Middleweight Champion. The match would later be aired as the opening match of MLW's debut episode of MLW Fusion on BeIN Sports. However, he would not again appear for the promotion in over a year. On the May 11, 2019, episode of MLW Fusion, a vignette aired announcing that Aries had signed to MLW and he would be returning soon. He debuted at MLW Fury Road, defeating Adam Brooks.

=== National Wrestling Alliance (2021–2022) ===
On November 19, 2021, the National Wrestling Alliance announced that Austin Aries would be competing in a match against Rhett Titus in a tournament for the NWA World Junior Heavyweight Championship at the NWA's next pay-per-view NWA Hard Times 2 on December 4, 2021. Austin would beat Titus at Hard Times 2 to progress to the semi-finals of the NWA Junior Heavyweight Championship Tournament. On the January 29, 2022, episode of NWA USA, it was announced that Austin would face Luke Hawx in the semi-final. Austin would beat Hawx on the February 5, 2022, episode of NWA USA to progress to the final of the tournament, which would take place at the National Wrestling Alliance event Crockett Cup on March 20, 2022.

=== Control Your Narrative (2022) ===
In February 2022, it was announced Aries was joining the new Control Your Narrative wrestling promotion created by EC3 and Adam Scherr.

=== Return to Major League Wrestling (2025–present) ===
Aries made his return to Major League Wrestling (MLW) as a commentator at Battle Riot VII. On August 20, Aries made his return to in-ring competition. He defeated Kushida in the first round of the 2025 Opera Cup tournament and Paul London in the quarterfinals, but then lost to Místico in the semifinals. On February 7, 2026 at Lucha Apocalypto, Aries defeated Blue Panther to win the MLW National Openweight Championship. He also won the 2026 Opera Cup, defeating Matt Riddle in the final on MLW Fusion to win the Opera Cup. On November 8 at an Fusion taping, he lost the National Openweight Championship to Riddle, ending his reign at 274 days.

== In other media ==
Prior to working for WWE, Aries provided the voice for the main character Jacob Cass in the Road to WrestleMania mode of the WWE '12 video game. Aries later appeared as himself only on WWE 2K17 as a downloadable character as part of the "Future Stars" pack.

== Personal life ==
Solwold has been a vegan since 2011 and has appeared in PETA videos encouraging the lifestyle. From 2012 to 2018, he was in a relationship with fellow professional wrestler Thea Trinidad (best known under the ring names "Rosita" and "Zelina Vega"). Growing up, Solwold played football and baseball. He is a supporter of the Green Bay Packers, Milwaukee Brewers, and Milwaukee Bucks. He has the Chinese character Ram (羊) tattooed on his upper left arm to signify the Chinese translation for Aries, his zodiac sign, and the latter part of his ring name. As of early 2018, Solwold Jr. was residing in Orlando, Florida.

On March 31, 2021, Solwold temporarily deactivated his Twitter account after receiving backlash for his views criticizing the COVID-19 vaccine.

== Championships and accomplishments ==
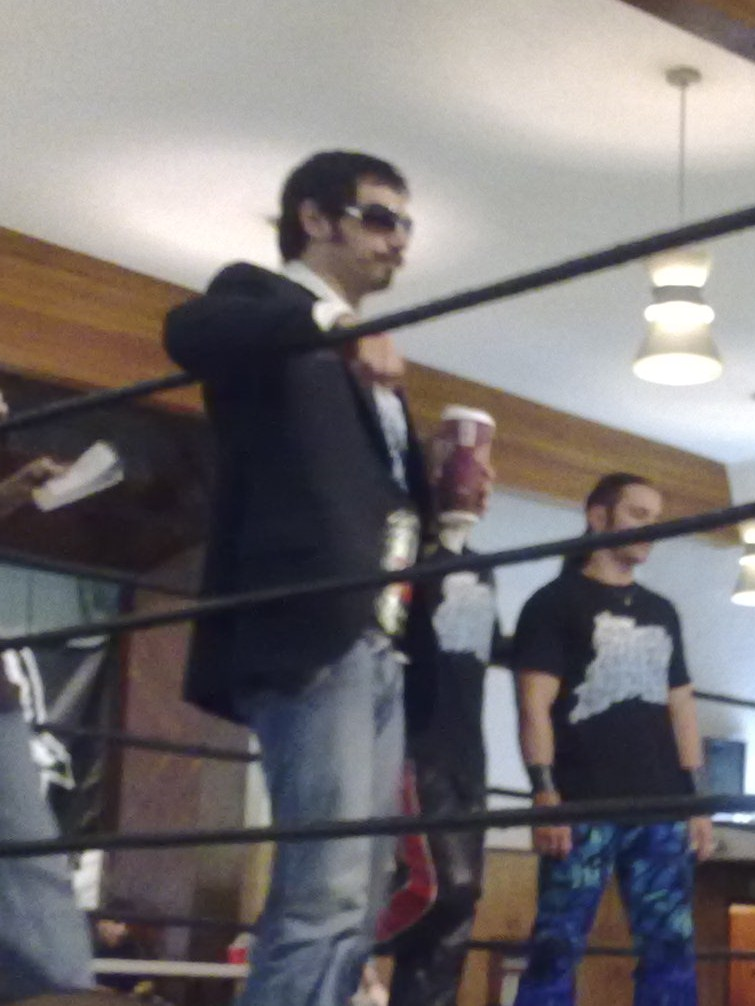
Aries was the first two-time ROH World Champion

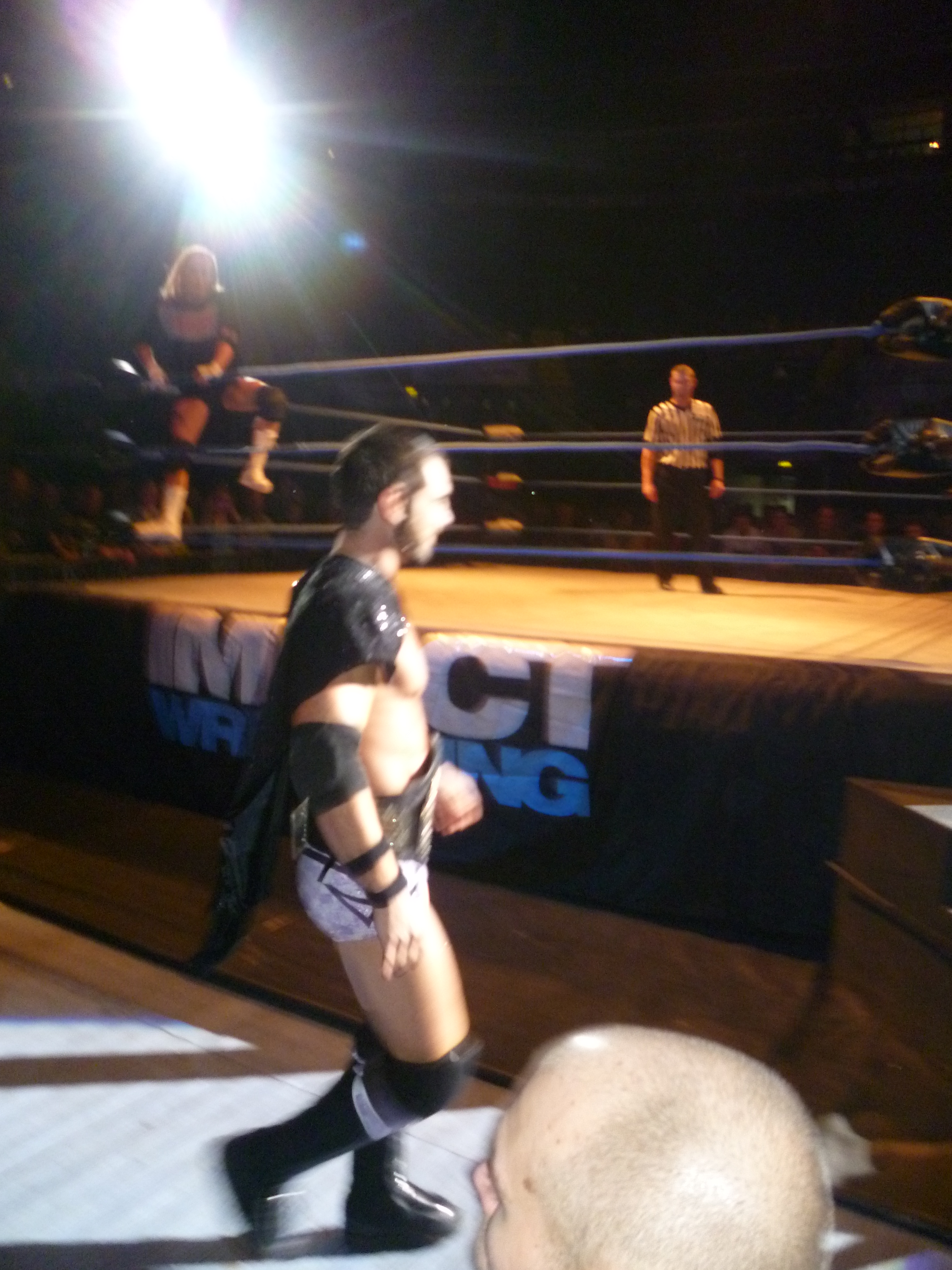
Aries held the TNA X Division Championship six times, his first reign being the longest in the title's history

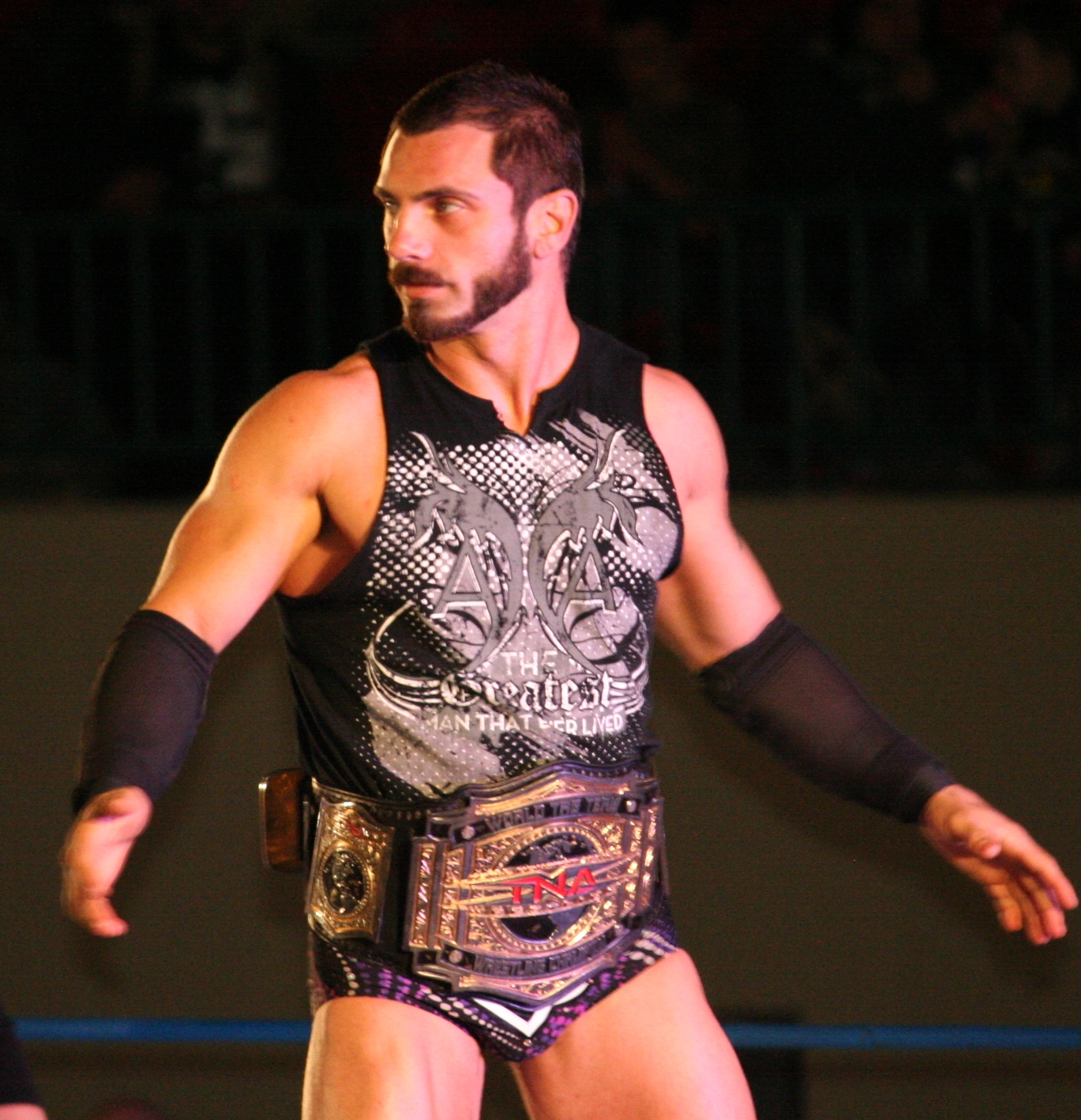
Aries is a former TNA World Tag Team Champion

- Canadian Wrestling's Elite
  - CWE Canadian Unified Junior Heavyweight Championship (1 time)
- Defiant Wrestling
  - Defiant World Championship (1 time)
- DEFY Wrestling
  - DEFY World Championship (1 time)
- Impact Pro Wrestling
  - IPW Tag Team Championship (1 time) – with Anthony Draven and Matty Starr
  - Hall of Fame Classic (2018)
- International Pro Wrestling: United Kingdom
  - IPW:UK World Championship (1 time)
- Major League Wrestling
  - MLW National Openweight Championship (1 time)
  - Opera Cup (2026)
- Mid-American Wrestling
  - MAW Junior Heavyweight Championship (1 time, inaugural)
  - MAW Junior Heavyweight Championship Tournament (2003)
- Midwest Championship Wrestling
  - MCW Light Heavyweight Championship (1 time)
- Midwest Independent Association of Wrestling
  - MIAW Cruiserweight Championship (2 times)
- Minnesota Independent Wrestling
  - MIW Cruiserweight Championship (2 times, inaugural)
  - MIW Tag Team Championship (1 time) – with Ted Dixon
  - MIW Cruiserweight Championship Tournament (2002)
- NWA Midwest
  - NWA Midwest X Division Championship (1 time, inaugural)
  - NWA Midwest X Division Title Tournament (2003)
- Neo Pro Wrestling
  - NPW Cruiserweight Championship (2 times)
  - NPW Cruiserweight Championship Tournament (2002)
- Pennsylvania Premiere Wrestling
  - PPW Heavyweight Championship (1 time)
- Pro Wrestling Illustrated
  - Ranked No. 12 of the top 500 wrestlers in the PWI 500 in 2013
- Pro Wrestling WAR
  - PWW Heavyweight Championship (1 time, inaugural)
- Ring of Honor
  - ROH World Championship (2 times)
  - ROH (World) Tag Team Championship (1 time) – with Roderick Strong (Note: During Aries reign as ROH Tag Team Champion the ROH Tag Team Championship name was changed to ROH World Tag Team Championship.)
- Rings Of Europe
  - Wachuer Wrestling Trophy (2005)
- Steel Domain Wrestling
  - SDW Tag Team Championship (1 time) – with Ted Dixon
- Impact Wrestling/Total Nonstop Action Wrestling
  - Impact World/TNA World Heavyweight Championship (3 times)
  - TNA X Division Championship (6 times)
  - Impact Grand Championship (1 time, final)
  - TNA World Tag Team Championship (1 time) – with Bobby Roode
  - Feast or Fired (2015 – TNA World Heavyweight Championship contract)
  - Gold Rush Tournament (2014)
  - X Division Showcase (2011)
  - Fifth Triple Crown Champion
  - Fifth Grand Slam Champion
- Unify Championship Entertainment
  - Unify World Championship (1 time)
- World Series Wrestling
  - WSW World Heavyweight Championship (2 times)
- Xtreme Latin American Wrestling
  - X-LAW Heavyweight Championship (1 time, current)
- Xtreme Wrestling Alliance
  - XWA Xtreme Rumble (2018)

== See also ==
- List of vegans
