= Destination X (2012) =

2012 Total Nonstop Action Wrestling pay-per-view event

- Promotional poster for the event featuring Austin Aries
- Promotion: Total Nonstop Action Wrestling
- Date: July 8, 2012
- City: Orlando, Florida
- Venue: Impact Zone
- Attendance: 1,100
- Tagline: "I Am The Main Event"

Pay-per-view chronology
← Previous; Slammiversary 10	Next → Hardcore Justice

Destination X chronology
← Previous; 2011	Next → 2013

The 2012 Destination X was a professional wrestling pay-per-view (PPV) event produced by the Total Nonstop Action Wrestling (TNA) promotion, which took place on July 8, 2012 at the Impact Wrestling Zone in Orlando, Florida. It was the eighth show under the Destination X chronology and seventh event in the 2012 TNA PPV schedule. Unlike last year, the event was held inside of a four-sided ring as opposed to a six-sided ring.

Nine matches were contested at the event. In the main event, Austin Aries defeated Bobby Roode to win the TNA World Heavyweight Championship. In other prominent matches, A.J. Styles defeated Christopher Daniels in a Last Man Standing match and Samoa Joe defeated Kurt Angle in a Bound for Glory Series match. The remainder of the show hosted an X Division Tournament to determine a new X Division Champion.

In October 2017, with the launch of the Global Wrestling Network, the event became available to stream on demand. It would later be available on Impact Plus in May 2019.

== Storylines ==
Destination X, also known as Project Destination Unknown, featured nine professional wrestling matches that involved different wrestlers from pre-existing scripted feuds and storylines. Wrestlers portrayed villains, heroes, or less distinguishable characters in the scripted events that built tension and culminated in a wrestling match or series of matches.

The main event of the Destination X featured Austin Aries taking on Bobby Roode for the TNA World Heavyweight Championship. On the June 14 edition of Impact Wrestling, TNA X Division Champion Aries was slated to main event Destination X as advertised. Aries, having hit the landmark of becoming the longest reigning X Division Champion in TNA history, asked General Manager Hulk Hogan for a World Title match against the longest and reigning TNA World Heavyweight Champion, Bobby Roode, at the PPV. Hogan, impressed with him as whole, gave him one week to decide on a proposal that if Aries wants his shot, he would be forced to relinquish the X Division Title (as Hogan did not want one wrestler holding both belts). A week later, Aries agreed to the stipulation with the caveat that all future X Division champions be given the same opportunity every year at Destination X. Hogan agreed to those terms and Aries was granted his championship match.

The ongoing feud between A.J. Styles and Christopher Daniels entering Destination X featured both men in a Last Man Standing match. At Slammiversary, A.J Styles teamed with Kurt Angle to dethrone Christopher Daniels and Kazarian of the TNA World Tag Team Championship. On the following week's Impact, Styles told TNA President Dixie Carter that they needed to bring the truth about what was happening between them to the forefront, as it was ammunition for Daniels against him in their feud. Styles and Carter revealed everything the following week, where a pregnant lady named Claire Lynch, opened up about Styles and Carter keeping her (Lynch) secret and helping her into rehab from her habits as an addict, making it clear there was no affair between the two. On the June 28 edition of Impact, with his head cleared from all the drama surrounding him and Carter, Styles announced that he got what he wanted which was a Last Man Standing match against Daniels at Destination X. Meanwhile, Kazarian expressed his hostility for partnering with Daniels and halting his friendship with Styles based on the revelation the week before, later only using this as a ruse to regain the tag titles with Daniels in the Slammiversary rematch that night. After the match, Daniels furthered the angle claiming that the truth was out regarding Claire, but not the fact that Styles is the father of her unborn child.

For two weeks leading up to Destination X, two X Division Title Tournament Qualifier matches took place featuring outside, non-contracted talent. The majority of the Destination X featured a tournament to crown a new TNA X Division Champion. First, there was a four-way match to determine the eighth and final qualifier. Then, the eight competitors (a mix of TNA contracted and outside wrestlers) were matched up in four semi-final singles matches. The winners of those matches advanced to an Ultimate X match later in the night, and the winner of Ultimate X, Zema Ion, became the new champion. In addition, there was a Bound For Glory Series match between longtime on-and-off rivals, Kurt Angle and Samoa Joe on the PPV.

== Event ==
Other on-screen personnel
Commentator	Mike Tenay
Commentator	Taz
Ring announcer	Jeremy Borash
Referee	Rudy Charles
Referee	Mark "Slick" Johnson
Referee	Andrew Thomas
Interviewers	Jeremy Borash

Due to family commitments, Jeremy Borash replaced Taz at the commentary booth during the event. Also since a near career-ending injury suffered at the February Against All Odds PPV, X Division wrestler Jesse Sorensen made an appearance at the event to show his appreciation for all the fan support he had been getting throughout his recovery process. Eventually, Sorensen mentioned his unfinished business with Zema Ion, who inadvertently injured him at the PPV. Sorensen also expressed his desire to pursue the X Division Championship.

=== Preliminary matches ===
Opening the event was the Last Chance Four Way match between Mason Andrews, Rubix, Dakota Darsow and Lars Only to qualify for the Ultimate X match contesting the TNA X Division Championship later in the night. Plenty of fast pace, back-and-forth high impact offensive maneuvers were seen between all four participants. Further on, Rubix cleared the ring and executed a leaping front flip dive to take out his competitors on the outside. Later, the match produced two big points where there was a three-way Tower of Doom out of the ring corner and a corner-to-corner missile dropkick by Rubix from one side of the ring to the next. After multiple moves that allowed all involved to showcase themselves, Andrews went on to hit his fireman's carry into a cutter finisher on Only to win the match by pinfall.

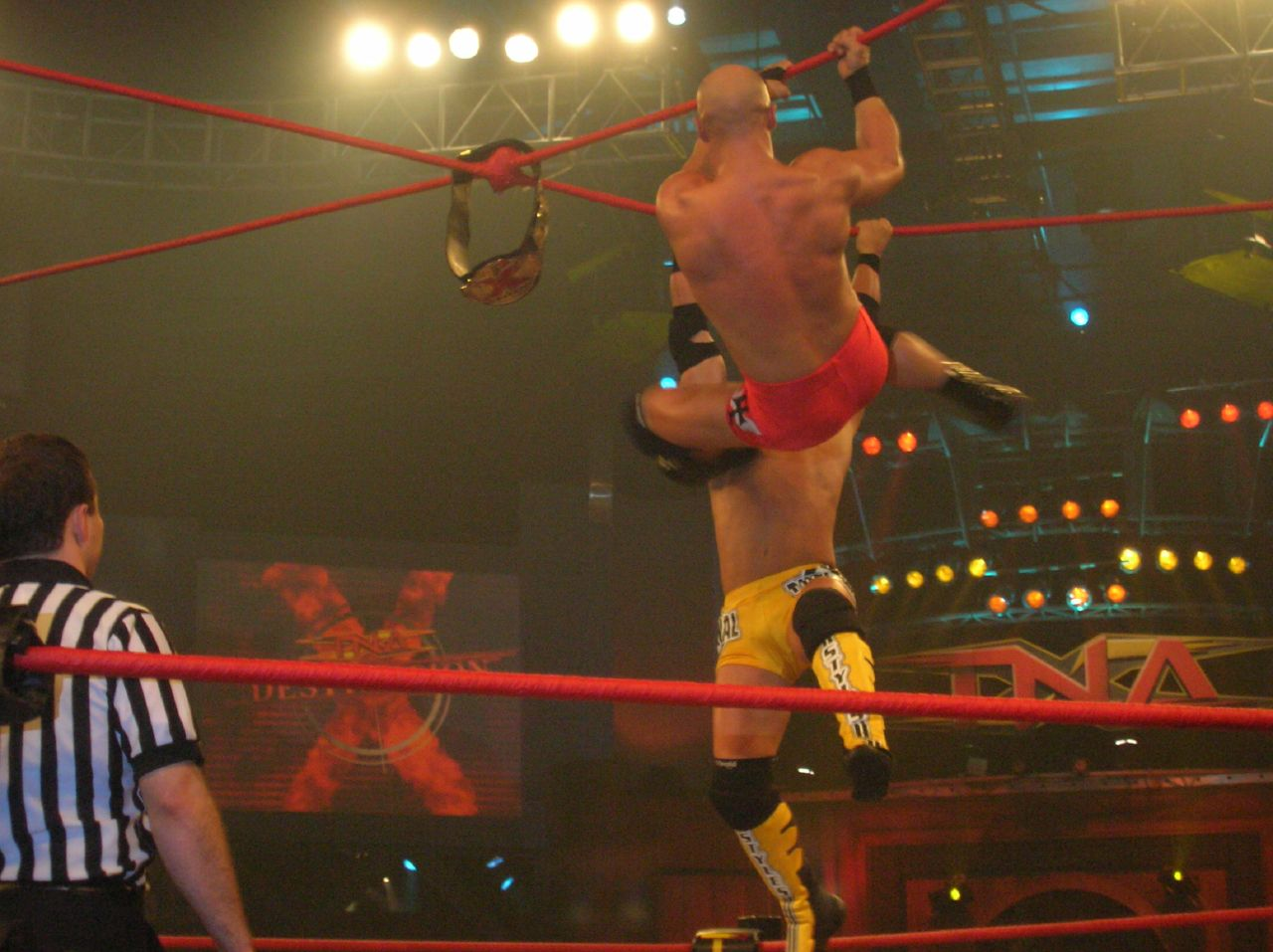
The Ultimate X match which is traditionally featured at Destination X

The second match was a Semifinal match with the advancing Mason Andrews taking on Kid Kash. For a majority portion of the match, Kash, picked apart Andrews, who had just previously competed in a grueling and high endurance match. Kash became frustrated at unsuccessful attempts to get a pinfall over Andrews, who fought back regardless of a heavy beat down, almost succeeding in defeating Kash. At the end, Andrews dodged a knee strike by Kash and rolled Kash up for the victory.

Kenny King versus Douglas Williams was next in a Semifinal match in the TNA X Division Title Tournament. Williams took control of the early goings of the match using his technical prowess. Gradually, action spilled to the outside after King exited the ring over the top rope with a twisting body charge at Williams on the outside. Back in the ring, King and Williams traded mat holds competitively until Williams nailed some offense, and eventually King returned some of his own. The match went to the outside again where both men were nearly counted out. The finish of the match came when King hit the Coronation and pinned to gain the win.

The fourth match on the card was a Semifinal match with Sonjay Dutt facing Rashad Cameron. Cameron established himself as a villain in the outset of the contest and handled the first parts of the match. Dutt eventually gained the upper hand, knocking Cameron out the ring, and following up with a flying dropkick. A little time later and Cameron regained control taunting at Dutt and the crowd. This didn't last as Cameron lost focus and started arguing with the referee. After some moves exchanged between Cameron and Dutt, Dutt brought the match to an end, connecting with a top rope moonsault double foot stomp onto Cameron and pinning for the victory.

The following match was a semifinal match where Zema Ion went face-to-face with Flip Cassanova. Ion dominated the match as soon as the bell rang and emphasized his cockiness by spraying up his hairstyle during the match. Cassanova was able to make a short comeback hitting a gut kick and a springboard corkscrew. Not enough to put Ion out; with Cassanova gasping after the aerial effort, Ion hit the Filipino Destroyer and covered Cassanova successfully.

=== Main events ===
In the first of the main events of the night, longtime on-and-off rivals Samoa Joe and Kurt Angle, battled in a Bound for Glory Series match. Joe and Angle began the encounter trying to best each other in wrestling holds till Joe got the lead and executed a facewash with his boot on Angle's face in the corner of the ring and following that up with a running boot kick. Soon after, Joe hit Angle to the outside and then jumped on the opportunity to charge Angle with a running suicide dive elbow smash out of the ring and through the ropes. By the time the action returned inside the ring, Angle continued on his attack on Joe with both men attempting submission holds on each other. Dominating, Angle slammed Joe down with three consecutive German suplexes, and tried to lock on the Anklelock, but Joe eluded the situation. Pursuing Joe, Angle got dropped by Joe with a One-armed side slam out of the corner of the ring. After hitting the Muscle Buster which was not enough to keep Angle down, Joe grew frustrated. Keeping on the offense, Joe attempted the Rear naked choke; however, Angle countered it and locked on the Anklelock. Joe worked to fight it and was able to get Angle in the Rear naked choke, almost making him tap out. Before that could happen, Angle elbowed out of it and hit a desperate Angle Slam which did not put away Joe. Angle locked back on the Anklelock that was reversed by Joe, who slid over Angle for the Rear naked choke again, and this time, as the match came down to the wire, Angle passed out momentarily in the hold. Because of this, the referee called for the bell to reward Joe as the winner of the match.

The next main event was between A.J Styles and Christopher Daniels combating in a Last Man Standing match. The match was first stalled by Daniels but soon turned into a physical fight between Styles and Daniels with action taken to ringside. As the fight returned inside the ring, Styles went wild on Daniels with a variation of strikes till he sent Daniels to the corner of the ring, where Daniels cut off a charging Styles with a boot to the face. After an array of moves attempted on an unfolded chair set up by Daniels in the ring, Daniels dropped Styles with a ura-nage back-first across the chair, taking over the match effectively from there. The match returned to the outside where Daniels smashed Styles head-first into the steel steps causing him to bleed. Back inside the ring, Styles countered a chair shot and connected with a springboard flying forearm smash that sent the chair into Daniels' face. Relentlessly, Styles pursued Daniels on the outside, sending Daniels head-first into the steps which resulted in bloodshed while Styles continued on the beat down. The fight relocated up the entrance ramp to the stage. Styles went for the Styles Clash, but Styles playing up to the audience allowed Daniels to counter with a back body drop. Daniels taking the lead didn't last as Styles later leaped off a section of the set to perform a springboard moonsault into an inverted DDT drop. The referee started to count Daniels out as Styles got to his feet just when Kazarian emerged and pushed Styles off the stage, assisting his partner Daniels. However, the referee only counted to 9 before Styles got back to his feet. Daniels pursued and rammed Styles into the nearby guardrail and then brought a table to the scene from under the ring and placed it below the stage. Daniels tried to go for the Angel's Wings from off the ramp only to be shoved into Kazarian by Styles. Styles capitalized by hitting the Pelé kick and then grabbed Daniels to hit the Styles Clash off the ramp and through the table below. Moments later, Daniels tried to get up and answer the 10 count unsuccessfully, as Styles made it to his feet before the 10 count to win the match.

The second last main event of the night was the culminating finals of the TNA X Division Championship Tournament between Zema Ion, Kenny King, Sonjay Dutt and Mason Andrews competing for the TNA X Division Championship in an Ultimate X match. King was the first to start scaling the Ultimate 'X' cables but was knocked off with a dropkick by Dutt. Ion was next and he was dragged down by King and Andrews. During the match, Dutt sustained an apparent injury after landing awkwardly from performing a running shooting star press. While he was out to receive medical aid, the match proceeded with King, Ion, and Andrews. Andrews made it across the cables near to the X Division bet centered in the middle of the 'X', however, King came off the ropes charging Andrews with a mid-air spear. Later on afterward, Dutt returned to the match as King and Sky were clinging onto the cables. Dutt and Ion started to climb the 'X' structure just as shortly when King dropped from the cables with a neckbreaker on Andrews. At the top, when both Ion and Dutt reached the middle of the cables, Ion was able to whip out his hairspray and impair Dutt's vision. Dutt fell off the cables leaving Ion on top of it to unhook and retrieve the title, and become the new champion.

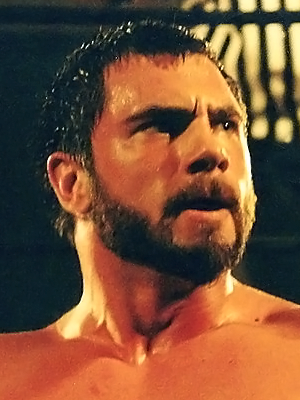
Austin Aries, who challenged Bobby Roode for the TNA World Heavyweight Championship

The main event of the night was Austin Aries taking on the defending champion Bobby Roode for the TNA World Heavyweight Championship. After testing each other out and exchanging control, the match reached a stand-off. Shortly, however, Aries cleared the ring of Roode and leaped off the top turnbuckle with a double axe handle to Roode's back. The action re-entered the ring where Roode took over after avoiding an onslaught by Aries and retained control over Aries dodging an attempted suicide dive to the outside that had Aries collide with the guardrail. Roode, advantageous, worked over Aries' midsection to follow up on the infliction, jeering him in the process. Aries mustered the courage to fight back explosively and eventually rocket launched himself with a suicide dive into Roode on the outside after Roode had exited the ring for a breather. Roode gradually stopped Aries' momentum, trying several ways to put away Aries including submission holds and finishers (which both Roode and Aries went back-and-forth in countering), using underhanded tactics behind the referee's back such as hitting Aries below the waist and clocking him over the head with the title belt, all to no avail. In the end, Roode went for the Pay Off on Aries, who countered it into a fast unsuccessful roll up. Roode charged after Aries in the corner as Aries moved out the way and tried to roll up Roode, who avoided it. Up to the finish, while Roode was still trying to get up, Aries landed a kick to Roode's chest and followed up with the Brainbuster in the middle of the ring. Aries proceeded to successfully pin Roode, winning the title for the first time and bringing Roode's 256-day title reign to a halt. The show ended with Aries celebrating with his newly won belt as red and white confetti fell in the Impact Zone.

== Reception ==
Destination X was given mainly positive reviews from critics. Matt Bishop of the SLAM! Sports section of the Canadian Online Explorer rated the entire event an 8 out of 10, which was relatively the same as last year's. Bishop, who thought of the show as fantastic, spoke on the main attraction of the night that surrounded Aries-Roode for the World Title, "Red and white colored confetti comes down through the sky in the Impact Zone as Aries celebrates one of the most improbable world title wins in professional wrestling history." He rated matches between 4-10 with the lowest going to Ion-Cassanova which was given 4 out of 10 and highest credited to the Angle-Joe match getting 8 out of 10, the Styles-Daniels encounter that received 9 out of 10, and the Roode-Aries main event that was rewarded 10 out of 10.

411 Mania wrestling section writer Colin Rinehart rewarded the event 9 out of 10, which was higher than last year's event that got 8 out of 10. Rinehart expressed his feelings that the company has invested effort into making Destination X a solid annual PPV and showcased its strongest points by bringing in young motivated talent, employing good booking decisions, and building coherent, long-term angles and stars. He also praised the action as "absolutely stellar wrestling" and the main event as "one of the flat out best wrestling matches I've seen all year with a fresh, over young face going over in the main event."

Dave Meltzer of the Wrestling Observer Newsletter chipped in his thoughts saying, "The second half of this show was tremendous. It would be hard to top Styles vs. Daniels but the main event was your classic world title match."

== Results ==
No.	Results	Stipulations	Times
1	Mason Andrews defeated Dakota Darsow, Lars Only and Rubix	Four-Way match to determine the final qualifier for the TNA X Division Championship Tournament	08:22
2	Mason Andrews defeated Kid Kash	X Division Championship Tournament Semi-Final match	08:10
3	Kenny King defeated Douglas Williams	X Division Championship Tournament Semi-Final match	10:35
4	Sonjay Dutt defeated Rashad Cameron	X Division Championship Tournament Semi-Final match	07:16
5	Zema Ion defeated Flip Cassanova	X Division Championship Tournament Semi-Final match	03:55
6	Samoa Joe defeated Kurt Angle by technical submission	Bound for Glory Series match	14:38
7	A.J. Styles defeated Christopher Daniels	Last Man Standing match	17:41
8	Zema Ion defeated Kenny King, Mason Andrews and Sonjay Dutt	Ultimate X Tournament Final match for the vacant TNA X Division Championship	08:50
9	Austin Aries defeated Bobby Roode (c)	Singles match for the TNA World Heavyweight Championship; This was Aries' Option C World Title Match	22:42
(c) / – the champion(s) heading into the match

=== Tournament bracket ===
Qualifiers; Impact Wrestling; June 28 – July 5, 2012; Destination X July 8, 2012
Sonjay Dutt	Pinfall
Rubix	3:06
Rashad Cameron	Pinfall
Mason Andrews	3:41
Flip Cassanova	Pinfall
Dakota Darsow	3:56
Kenny King	Pinfall
Lars Only	5:22
Dakota Darsow Lars Only Rubix	8:20 — —
Mason Andrews	Pinfall

1st Round; Destination X July 8, 2012
Sonjay Dutt	Pinfall
Rashad Cameron	7:10
Flip Cassanova	3:55
Zema Ion	Pinfall
Kenny King	Pinfall
Douglas Williams	10:35
Mason Andrews	Pinfall
Kid Kash	8:10

Final (Note: This was an Ultimate X match.); Destination X July 8, 2012
Sonjay Dutt	8:50
Zema Ion	Win
Kenny King	—
Mason Andrews	—

== See also ==
- 2012 in professional wrestling
