= Bound for Glory (2012) =

Professional wrestling pay-per-view event

- Bound for Glory poster featuring various TNA wrestlers
- Promotion: Total Nonstop Action Wrestling
- Date: October 14, 2012
- City: Phoenix, Arizona
- Venue: GCU Arena
- Attendance: 2,900
- Tagline: History Will Be Made

Pay-per-view chronology
| ← Previous; No Surrender | Next → Turning Point |

TNA Bound for Glory chronology
| ← Previous; 2011 | Next → 2013 |

The 2012 Bound for Glory was the eighth annual Bound for Glory professional wrestling pay-per-view (PPV) event produced by Total Nonstop Action Wrestling (TNA). It took place on October 14, 2012, at the Grand Canyon University Arena in Phoenix, Arizona. The event was the first TNA event in the state of Arizona, the first Bound for Glory PPV to be held in Southwestern United States, and was the premiere event of the 2012 for TNA.

Eight professional wrestling matches took place at the event broadcast on pay per view around the world. The predominant matches on the card included the main event which saw Jeff Hardy defeating the champion Austin Aries to capture the TNA World Heavyweight Championship, the Aces & Eights defeating Sting and Bully Ray to earn "full access" to TNA, Chavo Guerrero Jr. and Hernandez defeating both the champions The World Tag Team Champions of the World (Christopher Daniels and Kazarian), and A.J. Styles and Kurt Angle to win the TNA World Tag Team Championship, and James Storm defeating Bobby Roode in a Street Fight with King Mo as special guest enforcer.

With the launch of the Global Wrestling Network, the event became available to stream on demand in October 2017.

== Production ==
Other on-screen personnel
| Commentator | Mike Tenay |
| Commentator | Taz |
| Ring announcer | Jeremy Borash |
| Referee | Rudy Charles |
| Referee | Mark "Slick" Johnson |
| Referee | Earl Hebner |
| Referee | Andrew Thomas |
| Interviewers | Jeremy Borash |

=== Background ===
The eighth event in the Bound for Glory chronology was first announced on June 10, 2012, at the Slammiversary PPV to around the weekend where Sting would be formally inducted into the TNA Hall of Fame. Late June, TNA President Dixie Carter stated via Twitter that Bound for Glory would take place in a city not yet visited by the company and be revealed during the telecast of the July 5 edition of Impact Wrestling. During the show, an official video announcement confirmed the event would transpire at the Grand Canyon University Arena in Phoenix, Arizona on October 14, 2012. Before the tickets went on sale on July 27, 2012, Rob Van Dam promoted the event and signed autographs during a pre-sale session at the GCU Arena Box Office the day prior.

TNA hyped up their flagship PPV further by producing a series of Road To Bound for Glory preview videos featuring several wrestlers speaking highly of the event. After issuing a press release a month prior, TNA's programming home Spike aired Countdown to Bound for Glory, a 1-hour special preview an hour before the PPV.

To celebrate the event, TNA arranged travel packages and organized festivities to take place the weekend prior to the show. On October 13, 2012, the Bound for Glory VIP Weekend hosted events such as the Inaugural Hall of Fame Induction Celebration for Sting that was held at the Pointe Hilton Tapatio Cliffs Resort, and on that same day, the annual Bound for Glory Fan InterAction gave fans a chance to get close with their favorite stars for conversations, autographs, and photographs.

=== Storylines ===
Bound for Glory featured eight professional wrestling matches that involved different wrestlers from pre-existing scripted feuds and storylines. Wrestlers portrayed villains, heroes, or less distinguishable characters in the scripted events that built tension and culminated in a wrestling match or series of matches.

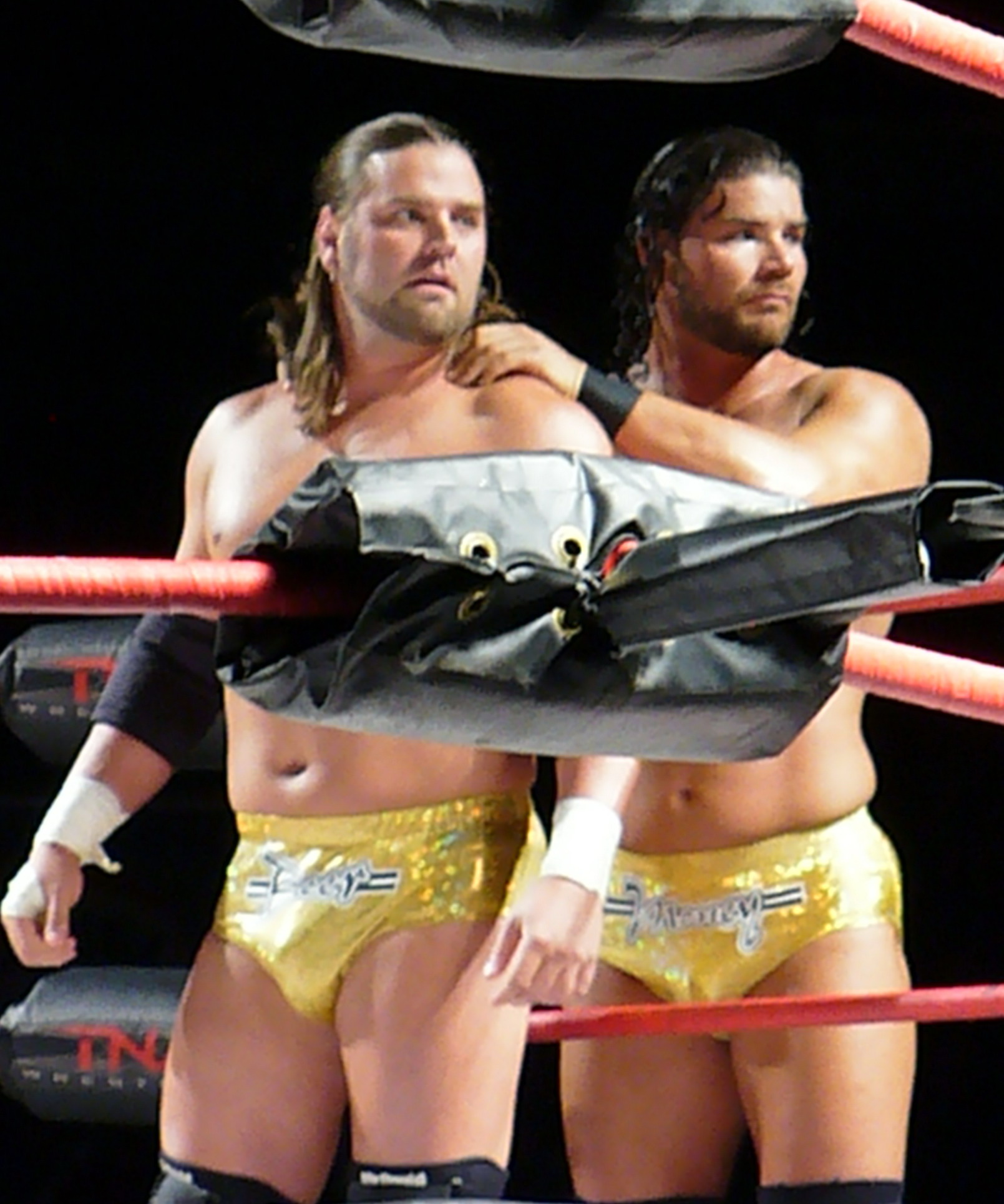
Roode and Storm culminated their long-standing rivalry.

Bobby Roode and James Storm culminated their long-standing feud in a Street Fight, with King Mo as special guest enforcer. The feud started when Bobby Roode turned on his previous Beer Money, Inc. ally, James Storm, to defeat him for the World Title in November 2011. On April 15, 2012, at Lockdown, James Storm, who had earned his rematch, fought then-TNA World Heavyweight Champion Bobby Roode in a cage match for the title. Leading up to the end of the match, Storm went for his Last Call superkick and accidentally booted Roode out of the cage door and onto the floor, giving Roode the unintended victory in an emotional loss in his home state. Internally wrecked by his faulty actions, Storm took a leave of absence and returned on June 10 at Slammiversary, with a momentous victory over Crimson, which ended Crimson's long running winning streak in what was an open challenge. On the following week's Impact Wrestling episode, Storm entered the BFG Series to earn back a shot at Roode for the title. However, the next month, Roode lost the TNA World Heavyweight Championship to Austin Aries on July 8 at Destination X, and after agreeing to and losing a stipulated rematch a month later on August 12 at Hardcore Justice, the result meant that Roode was barred from challenging Aries for the title as long as Aries was the champion. On September 9 at No Surrender, Roode went back to feuding with Storm, costing him his semifinals match against Bully Ray and the BFG Series altogether, after using Storm's own beer bottle to blast Storm over the head. Roode later explained his jealousy of watching Storm thrive in the BFG Series for someone he believed rode his coattails when they were allies as Beer Money. This triggered a series of brawls which could not be controlled by any of the officials in the weeks that followed. On the September 27 episode of Impact Wrestling, TNA General Manager Hulk Hogan announced a Street Fight between the two for Bound for Glory, with King Mo as the special guest enforcer to address the issues the referees were having with containing Roode and Storm's feud.

A tag team rivalry featured was TNA World Tag Team Champions Christopher Daniels and Kazarian, versus A.J. Styles and Kurt Angle, versus Chavo Guerrero Jr. and Hernandez in a three-way tag team match for the TNA World Tag Team Titles. On June 10 at Slammiversary, Angle and Styles won the titles in their victory over Daniels and Kazarian, who were the reigning champions. In short weeks after, however, Daniels and Kazarian regained the championships, and also continued their blackmail angle against Styles until it eventually concluded with the truth exposed. On September 9 at No Surrender, after both were eliminated from the BFG Series, Styles and Angle fought Daniels and Kazarian to a losing effort, allowing Daniels and Kazarian to secure a retention of their titles. On the following Impact Wrestling episode, TNA General Hulk Hogan announced singles matches for Daniels and Kazarian that night, with the implications that if they lost, the winner's team would get a TNA World Tag Team Title shot at Bound for Glory. Styles defeated Kazarian to earn himself and Angle a shot, and Guerrero also defeated Daniels to earn himself and Hernandez a shot at the titles, creating a three-way tag team match for the event.

As the major angle progressed, the rebel biker gang Aces & Eights fought Sting and Bully Ray in a No disqualification tag team match for "full access" to TNA. On the June 14 episode of Impact Wrestling, after addressing his TNA Hall of Fame induction announcement at Slammiversary, Sting was attacked by three masked men, which led to his short leave of absence. Three weeks later, the angle picked back up when an envelope was delivered to TNA General Manager Hulk Hogan containing a piece of paper with four cards attached reading, "8AA8" (Dead man's hand), and written below it, "See You Next Week!!", much to his bewilderment. The next week, Hogan and Sting were attacked by the group that grew in larger numbers, leaving Hogan with a storyline pelvic fracture and forcing him to take time away and put his GM duties on pause, with Sting filling in during his absence. Aces & Eights proceeded to attack various members of the TNA roster both faces and heels and one of which was essentially Bully Ray. Suspicion of various members of the TNA roster having a possible affiliation with Aces & Eights soon arose. In August, Aces & Eights encountered a series of brawls with the roster and on one of those occasions featured the return of Hogan to help fend for the roster. In September, Aces & Eights held attorney Joseph Park (who had started investigating them for Hogan) to ransom, to lure Hogan and Sting into their clubhouse to make a deal where the group would wrestle and gain "full access" to TNA events if they won a match, and in return, they would release Joseph Park. Ultimately, Hogan gave in and scheduled two members of Aces & Eights to take on Sting and a partner of his choice on October 14 at Bound for Glory. However, if Aces & Eights lost they agree to leave TNA.On the October 4 episode of Impact Wrestling, Sting, seeking out a partner, found Mr. Anderson as the best candidate, but Anderson was attacked by the group before he could take the position. Thus, Bully Ray quickly pledged that he was the right guy to join Sting, and after some hesitation due to Ray's reputation, Sting and Hogan accepted his help.

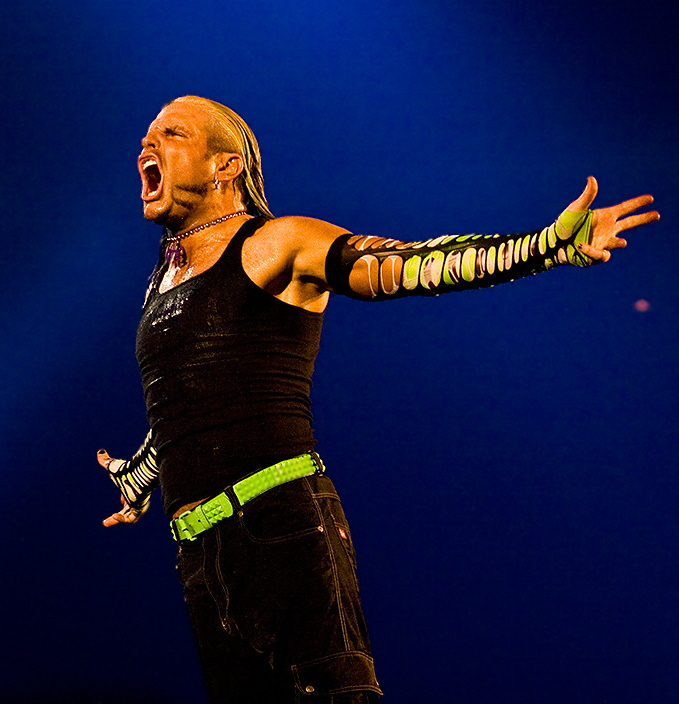
Jeff Hardy, winner of the 2012 Bound for Glory Series.

In June 2012, it was announced that the 3-month-long points tournament known as the Bound for Glory Series would return and feature 12 wrestlers to determine the number one contender to the TNA World Heavyweight Championship at Bound for Glory. As carried out, the top four contenders that earn the most points from victories on Impact, live shows, and pay per views, got to compete in the tournament finals matches at No Surrender. In September, James Storm, Samoa Joe, Bully Ray, and Jeff Hardy emerged as the frontrunners in the standings. On September 9 at the PPV event, instead of the four finalists continuing to compete for points as seen in the tournament last year, a basic tournament was set up to decide the winner. After Hardy defeated Joe, and Ray beat Storm in the semifinals, Hardy defeated Ray in the finals to win the Bound for Glory Series and go on to face TNA World Heavyweight Champion Austin Aries for the title in the main event of Bound for Glory. Hardy also faced Ray, who claimed Hardy lucked out, in a rematch for his BFG position on the next Impact Wrestling episode and won the match. With the main event still in place, Aries began exhibiting envy and lust over Hardy's success, treatment, and connection with fans, looking to prove he is every bit as good as him. Their feud heated up after Aries lost a non-title match to Ray a week later and was aided by Hardy before a post-match attack could be executed with the belt by Ray, where thereafter, Hardy got hold of the championship which Aries grabbed away furiously. The two adversaries continued to argue amongst each other for the next few weeks until the final Impact Wrestling episode before Bound for Glory. There, Aries, reacting off the crowd booing him to take Hardy's side a week prior, turned heel and attacked Hardy, eventually landing his Brainbuster finisher.

Another feud featured Joey Ryan and his rebuttal against Al Snow and TNA management. On the May 24 "Open Fight Night" edition of Impact Wrestling, Joey Ryan participated in a Gut Check match for an opportunity to join the TNA roster, and lost to Austin Aries. The next week, judges Taz, Al Snow, and Bruce Prichard elected not to sign Ryan to a contract based on his performance, though an online poll, however, showed 87% of the internet fanbase voted positively for Ryan. Ryan returned by appearing in the crowd on the June 28 edition of Impact Wrestling, interrupting the Gut Check evaluation of Taeler Hendrix. Unrelenting, Ryan returned by showing up in the crowd on the July 26 edition of Impact Wrestling during a Gut Check match, where Ryan punched Al Snow in the face after Snow came out to get Ryan out the building, leading to a high pursuit chase. Ryan resurfaced a few more times to confront Snow, tossing a drink in his face on one occasion and on the other, was slapped by Snow. On the October 4 edition of Impact Wrestling, Ryan met with Snow in the ring and received an apology for the slap from Snow, who believed it was an act of misconduct caused from his emotions. Refusing to accept the apology, and calling Snow "pathetic" along with conceding to manipulating the "87%" that voted for him online, Ryan then signed what he believed was a TNA contract; however, he instead signed on to a match with Snow on October 14 at Bound for Glory, with the stipulation existing that if Ryan won, he would get a spot on the TNA roster.

A feud between Samoa Joe and Magnus for the TNA Television Championship was featured. At the end of 2011, Samoa Joe and Magnus started teaming, and into the next year, won the TNA World Tag Team Championship at February's Against All Odds defeating Crimson and Matt Morgan. Their reign as champions lasted three months till May 13 at Sacrifice, where they were defeated by Christopher Daniels and Kazarian. Rather than going back after the tag titles, both Joe and Magnus entered the BFG Series on the June 14 episode of Impact Wrestling, and during the BFG Series Battle Royal — the first match of the tournament, Joe eliminated Magnus. On the August 16 episode of Impact Wrestling, Magnus was eliminated from the BFG Series itself when Joe defeated him in a match, leaving him outside the semifinals. Magnus not taking the loss lightly, attacked his tag team partner Joe with a chair, igniting a feud between them. On September 9 at No Surrender, Joe lost to Jeff Hardy in his BFG Series semifinals match. On the September 27 episode of Impact Wrestling, however, Joe defeated Mr. Anderson to win the vacant TNA Television Championship.

Tara squared off against TNA Knockouts Champion Miss Tessmacher for the title. In August 2012, Tara began pursuing the title, winning a non-title match against Tessmacher to become contender. On September 9 at No Surrender, Tara was unsuccessful in her attempt to capture the belt. Not long after, Tara turned villainous and attacked Tessmacher, officially ending their alignment in TnT. On the September 27 episode of Impact Wrestling, the evil Tara defeated ODB in a contender's match to gain a shot at the Knockout Title. The week after, Tara set up a date over the phone for Bound for Glory, confident that she would win the title. A week later, Tessmacher defeated Gail Kim in a non-title match. Encountering Tara after the bout, Tessmacher fought her off and laid her out with the Tess-Shocker.

Another match added to the event was Rob Van Dam versus defending champion Zema Ion for the TNA X Division Championship. On the October 11 edition of Impact Wrestling, Van Dam was given the opportunity to choose an opponent to face at Bound for Glory, and challenged Ion for the X Division Championship.

== Results ==
| No. | Results | Stipulations | Times |
|---|---|---|---|
| 1 | Rob Van Dam defeated Zema Ion (c) | Singles match for the TNA X Division Championship | 08:04 |
| 2 | Samoa Joe (c) defeated Magnus by submission | Singles match for the TNA Television Championship | 09:15 |
| 3 | James Storm defeated Bobby Roode | Street Fight with King Mo as the Special Guest Enforcer | 17:35 |
| 4 | Joey Ryan defeated Al Snow | Singles match Since Ryan won, he received a TNA contract. | 08:32 |
| 5 | Chavo Guerrero and Hernandez defeated Bad Influence (Christopher Daniels and Kazarian) (c) and A.J. Styles and Kurt Angle | Three-Way Tag Team match for the TNA World Tag Team Championship | 15:39 |
| 6 | Tara defeated Miss Tessmacher (c) | Singles match for the TNA Women's Knockout Championship | 06:21 |
| 7 | Aces & Eights (D.O.C. and Knux) defeated Bully Ray and Sting | No Disqualification match As a result of their win, Aces & Eights gained full access to the Impact Zone. Had Aces & Eights lost, they must leave TNA. | 10:51 |
| 8 | Jeff Hardy defeated Austin Aries (c) | Singles match for the TNA World Heavyweight Championship | 23:03 |
(c) / – the champion(s) heading into the match

== See also ==
- 2012 in professional wrestling
