= 2012 in professional wrestling =

2012 in professional wrestling describes the year's events in the world of professional wrestling.

== List of notable promotions ==
These promotions held notable events in 2012.

Promotion Name	Abbreviation	Notes
All Japan Pro Wrestling	AJPW	
Consejo Mundial de Lucha Libre	CMLL	
Juggalo Championship Wrestling	JCW	
LN Promotions	LN	
Lucha Libre AAA Worldwide	AAA	The "AAA" abbreviation has been used since the mid-1990s and had previously stood for the promotion's original name Asistencia Asesoría y Administración.
New Japan Pro-Wrestling	NJPW	
Pro Wrestling Guerrilla	PWG	
Pro Wrestling Noah	NOAH	
Ring of Honor	ROH	
Total Nonstop Action Wrestling	TNA	
World Wrestling Council	WWC	
WWE	—	WWE stands for World Wrestling Entertainment, which is still the legal name, but the company ceased using the full name in April 2011, with the WWE abbreviation becoming an orphaned initialism. NXT became WWE's developmental territory in June, replacing Florida Championship Wrestling (FCW), which ceased operations.

== Calendar of notable shows ==
=== January ===
Date	Promotion(s)	Event	Location	Main event	Notes
4	NJPW	Wrestle Kingdom VI	Tokyo	Hiroshi Tanahashi (c) defeated Minoru Suzuki in a Singles match to retain the IWGP Heavyweight Championship	
6/7/8	WWC	Euphoria	San Juan, Puerto Rico	Various	
8	TNA	Genesis	Orlando, Florida	Jeff Hardy defeated Bobby Roode (c) by disqualification in a singles match for the TNA World Heavyweight Championship	
29	WWE	Royal Rumble	St. Louis, Missouri	Sheamus won the 30-man Royal Rumble match by last eliminating Chris Jericho to earn a world championship match at WrestleMania XXVIII	Sheamus chose to challenge for the World Heavyweight Championship. This was Chris Jericho's first match in WWE since 2010
(c) – denotes defending champion(s)

=== February ===
Date	Promotion(s)	Event	Location	Main event
11	LN	A Nightmare To Remember II	Villa Rica, Georgia	Kyle Matthews defeated Jimmy Rave
12	NJPW	The New Beginning	Osaka	Kazuchika Okada defeated Hiroshi Tanahashi (c) in a Singles match to win the IWGP Heavyweight Championship
12	TNA	Against All Odds	Orlando, Florida	Bobby Roode (c) defeated Bully Ray, James Storm, and Jeff Hardy in a Four-Way match for the TNA World Heavyweight Championship with Sting as the Special Guest Ringside Enforcer
19	AJPW; NJPW; NOAH	All Together: Mōikkai, Hitotsu ni Narō ze	Sendai	Hiroshi Tanahashi, Suwama and Takeshi Morishima defeated Go Shiozaki, Seiya Sanada and Tetsuya Naito in a Six-man Tag team match
19	WWE	Elimination Chamber	Milwaukee, Wisconsin	John Cena defeated Kane in an Ambulance match
(c) – denotes defending champion(s)

=== March ===
Date	Promotion(s)	Event	Location	Main event
4	ROH	10th Anniversary Show: Young Wolves Rising	New York City, New York	Adam Cole and Eddie Edwards defeated Team Ambition (Davey Richards and Kyle O'Reilly) in a Tag team match
12	AAA	Rey de Reyes	Zapopan, Jalisco, Mexico	Rey de Reyes final four-way elimination match
18	TNA	Victory Road	Orlando, Florida	Bobby Roode defeated Sting in a No Holds Barred match
25	Progress	Progress Chapter One: In The Beginning	London, England	Nathan Cruz defeated El Ligero, Marty Scurll and Mike Mason to become the inaugural Progress World Champion
30–31	ROH	Showdown in the Sun	Fort Lauderdale, Florida	Davey Richards (c) defeated Eddie Edwards and Roderick Strong in a three-way elimination match for the ROH World Championship (Day 1); Davey Richards (c) defeated Michael Elgin in a Singles match for the ROH World Championship (Day 2)
(c) – denotes defending champion(s)

=== April ===
Date	Promotion(s)	Event	Location	Main event	Notes
1	WWE	WrestleMania XXVIII	Miami Gardens, Florida	The Rock defeated John Cena in a singles match	This was The Rock's first WrestleMania match since WrestleMania XX in 2004
15	TNA	Lockdown	Nashville, Tennessee	Bobby Roode (c) defeated James Storm in a Steel cage match for the TNA World Heavyweight Championship	
29	WWE	Extreme Rules	Rosemont, Illinois	John Cena defeated Brock Lesnar in an Extreme Rules match	This was Brock Lesnar's first match in WWE since 2004
(c) – denotes defending champion(s)

=== May ===
Date	Promotion(s)	Event	Location	Main event
3	NJPW	Wrestling Dontaku	Fukuoka	Kazuchika Okada (c) defeated Hirooki Goto in a Singles match to retain the IWGP Heavyweight Championship
12	ROH	Border Wars	Toronto, Ontario	Kevin Steen defeated Davey Richards (c) in a Singles match for the ROH World Championship
13	TNA	Sacrifice	Orlando, Florida	Bobby Roode (c) defeated Rob Van Dam in a Ladder match for the TNA World Heavyweight Championship
20	WWE	Over the Limit	Raleigh, North Carolina	John Laurinaitis defeated John Cena in a No Disqualification match Had Cena won, Laurinaitis would have been fired, and anyone who interfered would have been fired.
(c) – denotes defending champion(s)

=== June ===
Date	Promotion(s)	Event	Location	Main event
10	TNA	Slammiversary	Arlington, Texas	Bobby Roode (c) defeated Sting in a Singles match for the TNA World Heavyweight Championship
16	NJPW	Dominion	Osaka	Hiroshi Tanahashi defeated Kazuchika Okada (c) in a Singles match to win the IWGP Heavyweight Championship
17	WWE	No Way Out	East Rutherford, New Jersey	John Cena defeated Big Show in a steel cage match. Since Cena won, John Laurinaitis was fired, Had Show won, Cena would have been fired.
24	Progress	Progress Chapter Two: The March Of Progress	London, England	Nathan Cruz (c) defeated Marty Scurll score (2-1) in a Best two out of three falls match to retain the PROGRESS World Championship
24	ROH	Best in the World	New York, New York	Kevin Steen (c) defeated Davey Richards in the Anything Goes match for the ROH World Championship
29	CMLL	Infierno en el Ring	Mexico City, Mexico	10-woman Infierno en el Ring, Lucha de Apuestas Hair vs. Hair Steel cage match
30	WWC	39th WWC Aniversario	Bayamon, Puerto Rico	The Invaders defeated Mr. X & Masked Man
(c) – denotes defending champion(s)

=== July ===
Date	Promotion(s)	Event	Location	Main event
3	WWE	SuperSmackDown LIVE: The Great American Bash	Corpus Christi, Texas	Zack Ryder won by last eliminating Kane in a 20-Man Battle Royal to determine the guest General Manager for next week's SmackDown.
8	TNA	Destination X	Orlando, Florida	Austin Aries defeated Bobby Roode (c) in a Singles match for the TNA World Heavyweight Championship
15	WWE	Money in the Bank	Phoenix, Arizona	John Cena defeated Big Show, Kane, Chris Jericho, and The Miz in a Money in the Bank ladder match for a WWE Championship match contract
(c) – denotes defending champion(s)

=== August ===
Date	Promotion(s)	Event	Location	Main event
5	AAA	Triplemanía XX	Mexico City, Mexico	Dr. Wagner Jr. defeated Máscara Año 2000 Jr. (with Máscara Año 2000)
11	ROH	Boiling Point	Providence, Rhode Island	Kevin Steen (c) defeated Eddie Kingston in an Anything Goes match for the ROH World Championship
1-11	NJPW	G1 Climax final	Tokyo	Kazuchika Okada defeated Karl Anderson in a G1 Climax tournament
12	JCW	Bloodymania 6	Cave-In-Rock, Illinois	2 Tuff Tony (c) defeated Kongo Kong for the JCW World Heavyweight Championship
12	TNA	Hardcore Justice	Orlando, Florida	Austin Aries (c) defeated Bobby Roode in a Last Chance match for the TNA World Heavyweight Championship
19	WWE	SummerSlam	Los Angeles, California	Brock Lesnar defeated Triple H in a No Disqualification match
(c) – denotes defending champion(s)

=== September ===
Date	Promotion(s)	Event	Location	Main event
1-2	PWG	Battle of Los Angeles	Reseda, California	Adam Cole defeated Michael Elgin in a Battle of Los Angeles tournament
9	TNA	No Surrender	Orlando, Florida	Jeff Hardy defeated Bully Ray in the final of the 2012 Bound for Glory Series
14	CMLL	CMLL 79th Anniversary Show	Mexico City, Mexico	Rush defeated El Terrible in a two-out-of three-falls Lucha de Apuestas, Hair vs. Hair match
15	ROH	Death Before Dishonor	Chicago Ridge, Illinois	Kevin Steen (c) defeated Rhino in a No Disqualification match for the ROH World Championship
16	WWE	Night of Champions	Boston, Massachusetts	CM Punk (c) vs John Cena for the WWE Championship ended in a draw
23	NJPW	Destruction	Kobe	Hiroshi Tanahashi (c) defeated Naomichi Marufuji in a Singles match to retain the IWGP Heavyweight Championship
30	Progress	Progress Chapter Three: Fifty Shades Of Pain	London, England	Dave Mastiff and Greg Burridge defeated El Ligero and Nathan Cruz
(c) – denotes defending champion(s)

=== October ===
Date	Promotion(s)	Event	Location	Main event
7	AAA	Heroes Inmortales	San Luis Potosí, San Luis Potosí	Jack Evans and La Secta Bizarra Cibernetica (Cibernético, Dark Cuervo and Dark Ozz) defeated Los Perros del Mal (Halloween, El Hijo del Perro Aguayo, Psicosis and Teddy Hart)
8	NJPW	King of Pro-Wrestling	Tokyo	Hiroshi Tanahashi (c) defeated Minoru Suzuki in a Singles match to retain the IWGP Heavyweight Championship
13	ROH	Glory By Honor	Mississauga, Ontario	Kevin Steen (c) defeated Michael Elgin in a Singles match for the ROH World Championship
14	TNA	Bound for Glory	Phoenix, Arizona	Jeff Hardy defeated Austin Aries (c) in a Singles match for the TNA World Heavyweight Championship
28	WWE	Hell in a Cell	Atlanta, Georgia	CM Punk (c) defeated Ryback in a Hell in a Cell match to retain the WWE Championship
(c) – denotes defending champion(s)

=== November ===
Date	Promotion(s)	Event	Location	Main event	Notes
11	NJPW	Power Struggle	Osaka	Hiroshi Tanahashi (c) defeated Yujiro Takahashi in a Singles match to retain the IWGP Heavyweight Championship	
11	TNA	Turning Point	Orlando, Florida	Jeff Hardy (c) defeated Austin Aries in a Ladder match for the TNA World Heavyweight Championship	
18	WWE	Survivor Series	Indianapolis, Indiana	CM Punk (c) defeated John Cena and Ryback in a Triple threat match to retain the WWE Championship	This event was notable for the onscreen debut of The Shield
(c) – denotes defending champion(s)

=== December ===
Date	Promotion(s)	Event	Location	Main event	Notes
9	WWE	Tribute to the Troops	Norfolk, Virginia	John Cena defeated Antonio Cesaro in a Singles match	
9	TNA	Final Resolution	Orlando, Florida	Jeff Hardy (c) defeated Bobby Roode in a Singles match for the TNA World Heavyweight Championship	
14	CMLL	Sin Piedad	Mexico City, Mexico	La Sombra defeated Tama Tonga in a Singles match for the 2012 La Copa Junior Tournament Final	
16	WWE	TLC: Tables, Ladders & Chairs	Brooklyn, New York	Dolph Ziggler (contract holder) defeated John Cena in a Ladder match to retain the World Heavyweight Championship Money in the Bank contract	This marked The Shield's in-ring debut
16	ROH	Final Battle 2012: Doomsday	New York, New York	Kevin Steen (c) defeated El Generico in the Ladder War IV for the ROH World Championship	This was El Generico's last match in ROH before signing with the WWE as the new ring name Sami Zayn on NXT
(c) – denotes defending champion(s)

== Accomplishments and tournaments ==
=== AAA ===
Accomplishment	Winner	Date won	Notes
Rey de Reyes	El Hijo del Perro Aguayo	March 18	

=== JWP ===
Accomplishment	Winner	Date won	Notes
Tag League the Best 2012	Ran Yu-Yu and Toshie Uematsu	April 8	

=== Ring of Honor ===
Accomplishment	Winner	Date won	Notes
Rise and Prove Tournament	TMDK (Mikey Nicholls and Shane Haste)	February 17	
March Mayhem Tournament	Tommaso Ciampa	March 13	
ROH World Tag Team Championship Tournament	S.C.U.M. (Jimmy Jacobs and Steve Corino)	September 15	

=== Total Nonstop Action Wrestling ===
Accomplishment	Winner	Date won	Notes
Wild Card Tournament	Magnus and Samoa Joe	January 8	
TNA X Division Championship Tournament	Zema Ion	July 8	
Turkey Bowl	Eric Young	November 22	

=== WWE ===
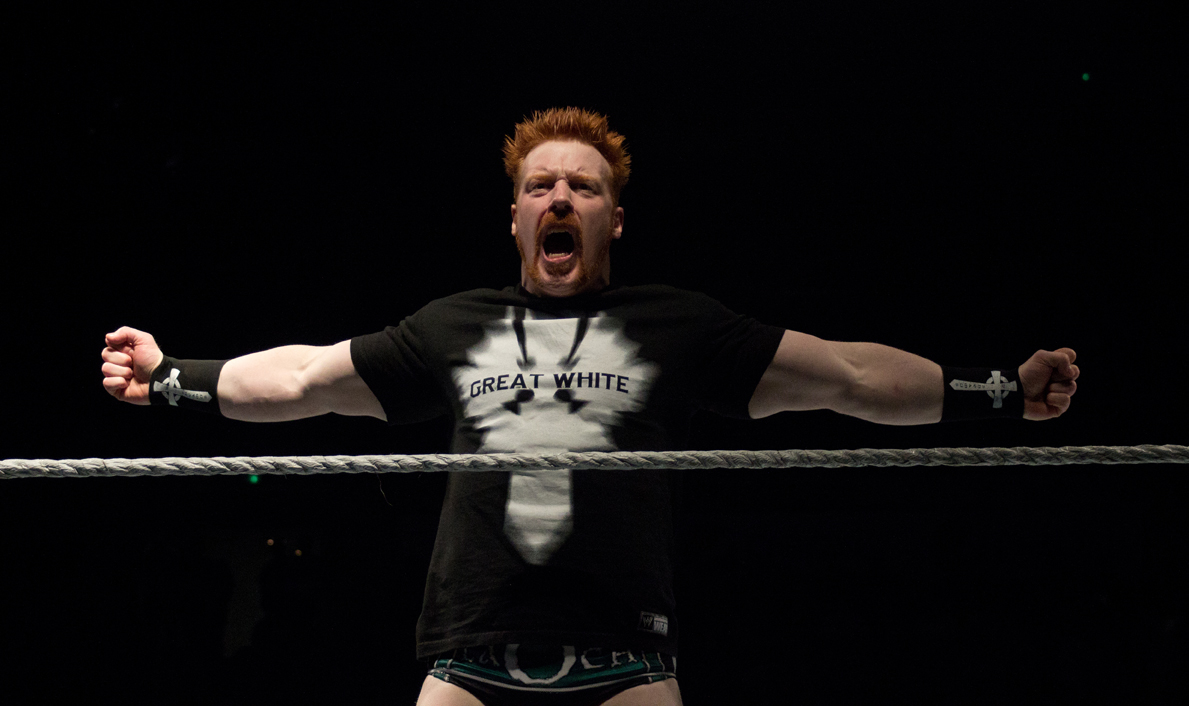
Sheamus won the 2012 Royal Rumble

Accomplishment	Winner	Date won	Notes
Royal Rumble	Sheamus	January 29	Winner received their choice of a championship match for either the WWE Championship or World Heavyweight Championship at WrestleMania XXVIII; Sheamus last eliminated Chris Jericho to win and chose to challenge for the World Heavyweight Championship, which he subsequently won from Daniel Bryan.
Money in the Bank ladder match	Dolph Ziggler	July 15	Defeated Damien Sandow, Tyson Kidd, Christian, Santino Marella, Tensai, Cody Rhodes, and Sin Cara to win a World Heavyweight Championship match contract. Ziggler cashed in the contract on the April 8, 2013 episode of Raw and won the title from Alberto Del Rio.
Money in the Bank ladder match	John Cena	July 15	Defeated Kane, Chris Jericho, Big Show, and The Miz to win a WWE Championship match contract. Cena cashed in the contract on the July 23 episode of Raw but won the match against champion CM Punk by disqualification thanks to interference from Big Show, thus Cena did not win the title.
Gold Rush Tournament	Seth Rollins	July 26 (aired August 29)	Defeated Jinder Mahal in the tournament final to win the inaugural NXT Championship.
WWE Tag Team Championship #1 Contender's Tournament	Team Rhodes Scholars (Cody Rhodes and Damien Sandow)	October 22	Defeated Rey Mysterio and Sin Cara in the tournament final to win a WWE Tag Team Championship match at Hell in a Cell, but were unsuccessful in winning the title from Team Hell No (Daniel Bryan and Kane).

== Title changes ==
=== AAA ===
AAA Mega Championship
Incoming champion – Jeff Jarrett
Date	Winner	Event/Show	Note(s)
March 18	El Mesias	Rey de Reyes	
December 2	El Texano Jr.	Guerra de Titanes	

AAA Latin American Championship
Incoming champion – L.A. Park
No title changes

AAA World Mini-Estrella Championship
Incoming champion – Mini Psicosis
No title changes

AAA World Cruiserweight Championship
Incoming champion – Jack Evans
Date	Winner	Event/Show	Note(s)
May 19	Juventud Guerrera	Noche de Campeones	
December 2	Daga	Guerra de Titanes	

AAA Reina de Reinas Championship
Incoming champion – Sexy Star
Date	Winner	Event/Show	Note(s)
No title changes

AAA World Tag Team Championship
Incoming champions – La Legión Extranjera (Abyss and Chessman)
Date	Winner	Event/Show	Note(s)
October 7	Joe Líder and Vampiro	Héroes Inmortales	

AAA World Mixed Tag Team Championship
Incoming champions – La Sociedad (Alan Stone and Jennifer Blake)
Date	Winner	Event/Show	Note(s)
October 7	Halloween and Mari Apache	Héroes Inmortales	

AAA World Trios Championship
Incoming champions – Los Perros del Mal (Damián 666, Halloween and X-Fly)
Date	Winner	Event/Show	Note(s)
March 11	Los Psycho Circus (Monster Clown, Murder Clown and Psycho Clown)	Sin Límite	
May 19	El Consejo (Máscara Año 2000 Jr., El Texano Jr. and Toscano)	Noche de Campeones	

=== NJPW ===
IWGP Heavyweight Championship
Incoming champion – Hiroshi Tanahashi
Date	Winner	Event/Show	Note(s)
February 12	Kazuchika Okada	The New Beginning	
June 16	Hiroshi Tanahashi	Dominion 6.16	

IWGP Intercontinental Championship
Incoming champion – Masato Tanaka
Date	Winner	Event/Show	Note(s)
February 12	Hirooki Goto	The New Beginning	
July 22	Shinsuke Nakamura	Kizuna Road	

IWGP Tag Team Championship
Incoming champions – Bad Intentions (Giant Bernard and Karl Anderson)
Date	Winner	Event/Show	Note(s)
January 4	Tencozy (Hiroyoshi Tenzan and Satoshi Kojima)	Wrestle Kingdom VI	
May 3	Chaos (Takashi Iizuka and Toru Yano)	Wrestling Dontaku	
June 20	Vacated	–	Iizuka and Yano were stripped of the titles after a title match between them and Tencozy (Hiroyoshi Tenzan and Satoshi Kojima) on June 16 ended in a no contest.
July 22	Tencozy (Hiroyoshi Tenzan and Satoshi Kojima)	Kizuna Road	Defeated Chaos (Takashi Iizuka and Toru Yano) to win the vacant title.
October 8	K.E.S. (Davey Boy Smith Jr. and Lance Archer)	King of Pro-Wrestling	

IWGP Junior Heavyweight Championship
Incoming champion – Prince Devitt
Date	Winner	Event/Show	Note(s)
May 3	Low Ki	Wrestling Dontaku	
July 29	Kota Ibushi	Last Rebellion	
October 8	Low Ki	King of Pro-Wrestling	
November 11	Prince Devitt	Power Struggle	

IWGP Junior Heavyweight Tag Team Championship
Incoming champions – No Remorse Corps (Davey Richards and Rocky Romero)
Date	Winner	Event/Show	Note(s)
January 4	Apollo 55 (Prince Devitt and Ryusuke Taguchi)	Wrestle Kingdom VI	
February 12	No Remorse Corps (Davey Richards and Rocky Romero)	The New Beginning	
May 2	Vacated	–	Title held up after Davey Richards was unable to attend Wrestling Dontaku 2012 due to travel issues.
June 16	Jushin Thunder Liger and Tiger Mask	Dominion 6.16	Liger and Tiger Mask defeated Suzuki-gun (Taichi and Taka Michinoku) to win the vacant title.
July 22	Forever Hooligans (Alex Koslov and Rocky Romero)	Kizuna Road	
November 11	Time Splitters (Alex Shelley and Kushida)	Power Struggle	

NEVER Openweight Championship
(Title created)
Date	Winner	Event/Show	Note(s)
November 19	Masato Tanaka	Shodai NEVER Musabetsu Kyu Oza Kettei Tournament Final	Tanaka defeated Karl Anderson in the finals of a sixteen-man tournament to become the inaugural champion.

=== ROH ===
ROH World Championship
Incoming champion – Davey Richards
Date	Winner	Event/Show	Note(s)
May 12	Kevin Steen	Border Wars	

ROH World Television Championship
Incoming champion – Jay Lethal
Date	Winner	Event/Show	Note(s)
March 31	Roderick Strong	Showdown in the Sun	
June 29	Adam Cole	Ring of Honor Wrestling	

ROH World Tag Team Championship
Incoming champions – The Briscoe Brothers (Jay and Mark Briscoe)
Date	Winner	Event/Show	Note(s)
May 12	Wrestling's Greatest Tag Team (Charlie Haas and Shelton Benjamin)	Border Wars	
June 24	The All Night Express (Rhett Titus and Kenny King)	Best in the World 2012: Hostage Crisis	
July 10	Vacated	N/A	
September 15	S.C.U.M. (Jimmy Jacobs and Steve Corino)	Death Before Dishonor X: State of Emergency	
December 16	The Briscoe Brothers (Jay and Mark Briscoe)	Final Battle 2012: Doomsday	

=== TNA ===
TNA World Heavyweight Championship
Incoming champion – Bobby Roode
Date	Winner	Event/Show	Note(s)
July 8	Austin Aries	Destination X	Aries voluntarily vacated the TNA X Division Championship in exchange for a TNA World Heavyweight Championship match at the event.
October 14	Jeff Hardy	Bound for Glory	

TNA X Division Championship
Incoming champion – Austin Aries
Date	Winner	Event/Show	Note(s)
July 8	Vacated	Destination X	Austin Aries voluntarily vacated the TNA X Division Championship in exchange for a TNA World Heavyweight Championship match at the event.
July 8	Zema Ion	Destination X	Ultimate X match for the vacant title, also involving Kenny King, Mason Andrews, and Sonjay Dutt.
October 14	Rob Van Dam	Bound for Glory	

TNA World Tag Team Championship
Incoming champions – Crimson and Matt Morgan
Date	Winner	Event/Show	Note(s)
February 12	Magnus and Samoa Joe	Against All Odds	
May 13	The World Tag Team Champions of the World (Christopher Daniels and Kazarian)	Sacrifice	
June 10	A.J. Styles and Kurt Angle	Slammiversary X	
June 28	The World Tag Team Champions of the World (Christopher Daniels and Kazarian)	Impact Wrestling	
October 14	Chavo Guerrero and Hernandez	Bound for Glory	

TNA Knockouts Tag Team Championship
Incoming champions – Gail Kim and Madison Rayne
Date	Winner	Event/Show	Note(s)
March 8	Eric Young and ODB	Impact Wrestling	

TNA Knockouts Championship
Incoming champion – Gail Kim
Date	Winner	Event/Show	Note(s)
June 10	Miss Tessmacher	Slammiversary	
August 12	Madison Rayne	Hardcore Justice	
August 16	Miss Tessmacher	Impact Wrestling	
October 14	Tara	Bound for Glory	

TNA Television Championship
Incoming champion – Robbie E
Date	Winner	Event/Show	Note(s)
March 18	Devon	Victory Road	
September 26	Vacated	N/A	
September 27	Samoa Joe	Impact Wrestling	
December 6	Devon	Impact Wrestling	

=== WWE ===
WWE Championship
Incoming champion – CM Punk
No title changes

World Heavyweight Championship
Incoming champion – Daniel Bryan
Date	Winner	Event/Show	Note(s)
April 1	Sheamus	WrestleMania XXVIII	
October 28	Big Show	Hell in a Cell	

WWE Intercontinental Championship
Incoming champion – Cody Rhodes
Date	Winner	Event/Show	Note(s)
April 1	Big Show	WrestleMania XXVIII	
April 29	Cody Rhodes	Extreme Rules	Tables match
May 20	Christian	Over the Limit	
July 23	The Miz	Raw 1000	
October 16 (aired October 17)	Kofi Kingston	Main Event	
December 29 (aired December 31)	Wade Barrett	Monday Night Raw	

WWE United States Championship
Incoming champion – Zack Ryder
Date	Winner	Event/Show	Note(s)
January 16	Jack Swagger	Monday Night Raw	
March 5	Santino Marella	Monday Night Raw	
August 19	Antonio Cesaro	SummerSlam; Pre-Show	

WWE Divas Championship
Incoming champion – Beth Phoenix
Date	Winner	Event/Show	Note(s)
April 23	Nikki Bella	Monday Night Raw	Lumberjill match
April 29	Layla	Extreme Rules	Layla pinned Brie Bella to win the title from Nikki Bella after the twins switched places during the match while the referee was distracted.
September 16	Eve Torres	Night of Champions	

WWE Tag Team Championship
Incoming champions – Air Boom (Evan Bourne and Kofi Kingston)
Date	Winner	Event/Show	Note(s)
January 15	Primo & Epico	House show	
April 30	Kofi Kingston and R-Truth	Monday Night Raw	
September 16	Team Hell No (Kane and Daniel Bryan)	Night of Champions	

==== NXT ====
NXT Championship
(Title created)
Date	Winner	Event/Show	Note(s)
July 26 (aired August 29)	Seth Rollins	NXT	Defeated Jinder Mahal in the tournament final to become the inaugural champion.
December 6 (aired January 9, 2013)	Big E Langston	NXT	No-disqualification match.

== Awards and honors ==
=== AAA Hall of Fame ===
Inductee
Octagón
Perro Aguayo

=== Pro Wrestling Illustrated ===
Category	Winner
Wrestler of the Year	CM Punk
Tag Team of the Year	Kofi Kingston and R-Truth
Match of the Year	The Undertaker vs. Triple H (WrestleMania XXVIII)
Feud of the Year	Aces & Eights vs. TNA
Most Popular Wrestler of the Year	John Cena
Most Hated Wrestler of the Year	CM Punk
Comeback of the Year	Jeff Hardy
Most Improved Wrestler of the Year	Ryback
Inspirational Wrestler of the Year	Jerry Lawler
Rookie of the Year	Veda Scott
Woman of the Year	AJ Lee
Stanley Weston Award (Lifetime Achievement)	Bobby Heenan

=== TNA Hall of Fame ===
Inductee
Sting

=== Wrestling Observer Newsletter ===
==== Wrestling Observer Newsletter Hall of Fame ====
Inductee
Mick McManus
Alfonso Morales
John Cena
Hans Schmidt
Lou Albano
Gus Sonnenberg

==== Wrestling Observer Newsletter awards ====
Category	Winner
Wrestler of the Year	Hiroshi Tanahashi
Most Outstanding	Hiroshi Tanahashi
Best Box Office Draw	The Rock
Feud of the Year	Hiroshi Tanahashi vs. Kazuchika Okada
Tag Team of the Year	Bad Influence (Christopher Daniels and Kazarian)
Most Improved	Kazuchika Okada
Best on Interviews	CM Punk

=== WWE ===
==== WWE Hall of Fame ====
Category	Inductee	Inducted by
Individual	Mil Máscaras	Alberto Del Rio
Individual	Edge	Christian
Individual	Ron Simmons	John "Bradshaw" Layfield
Individual	Yokozuna	Jimmy Uso and Jey Uso
Group	The Four Horsemen	Dusty Rhodes
Celebrity	Mike Tyson	D-Generation X (Shawn Michaels and Triple H)

==== Slammy Awards ====
Poll	Winner
Feat of Strength of the Year	Sheamus delivers White Noise to Big Show
Best Dancer of the Year	Brodus Clay
Top Social Media Ambassador	Charlie Sheen
Tweet of the Year	"Goat face is a horrible insult. My face is practically perfect in every way. In fact, from now on I demand to be called Beautiful Bryan." – Daniel Bryan
Insult of the Year	John Cena to Dolph Ziggler & Vickie Guerrero: "You're the exact opposite. One enjoys eating a lot of nuts and the other is still trying to find his."
Facial Hair of the Year	Daniel Bryan
Betrayal of the Year	Big Show knocks out John Cena at Over the Limit
Crowd Chant of the Year	"Feed Me More!"
WWE.com Exclusive Video of the Year	Jerry Lawler speaks to WWE.com about his miraculous return
Upset of the Year	Daniel Bryan defeats Mark Henry and Big Show at Royal Rumble
Diva of the Year	AJ Lee
"Tell Me I Didn't Just See That" Moment of the Year	Kofi Kingston handstands during the Royal Rumble match to avoid elimination at Royal Rumble
Comeback of the Year	Jerry Lawler
Kiss of the Year	AJ Lee and John Cena
Superstar of the Year	John Cena
LOL! Moment of the Year	The Rock throws John Cena's things into the Boston Harbor
#Trending Now of the Year	Ryback's #FeedMeMore
Newcomer of the Year	Ryback
Match of the Year	Hell in a Cell match: The Undertaker vs. Triple H – WrestleMania XXVIII

== Debuts ==
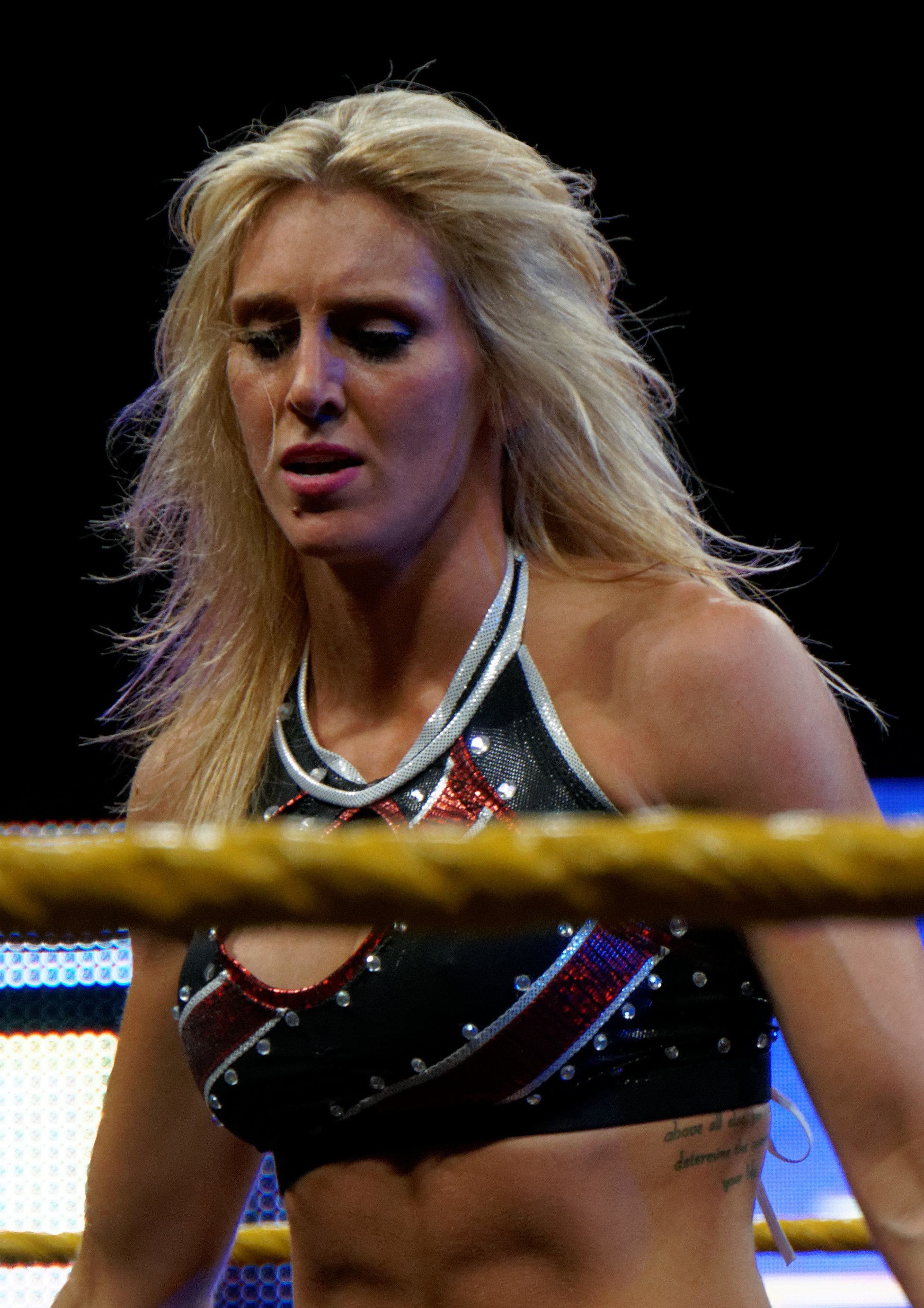
Charlotte Flair

- unknown date – Moose
- January 7 – Dale Patricks
- January 14 – Ayumu Gunji
- January 22 – Natsumi Sumikawa
- March 31 – Gene Munny
- April 1 – Will Ospreay and Tetsuya Endo
- April 8 – Ayumu Honda
- April 12 – Ilja Dragunov
- April 13 – Hideyoshi Kamitani
- May 12 – Reyna Isis
- July 11 – Drew Parker
- July 12 – Charlotte Flair and Emersyn Jayne
- July 14 – Anthony Greene
- July 28 – Yoshihisa Uto
- August 8 – Mojo Rawley
- August 12 – Rydeen Hagane
- August 18 – Konosuke Takeshita
- September 1 – Aaron Henare
- September 22 – Jacob Fatu
- October 14 – Tank Nagai
- October 18 – Baron Corbin
- October 21 – Van Vert Jack
- October 25 – Enzo Amore
- October 28 – Kyuri
- November 15 – Sho Tanaka
- November 19 – Yohei Komatsu
- November 23 – Sagat
- December 2 – Chris Ridgeway
- December 4 – Shigeyuki Kawahara
- December 12 – El Hijo del Vikingo
- December 22 – David Finlay (wrestler)
- December 29 – SAKI and MIZUKI
- December 31 – Erin (Ice Ribbon), Rutsuko Yamaguchi (Ice Ribbon), Hiroko Terada (Ice Ribbon), Ayano Takeda (Ice Ribbon) and 235 (Ice Ribbon)

== Retirements ==
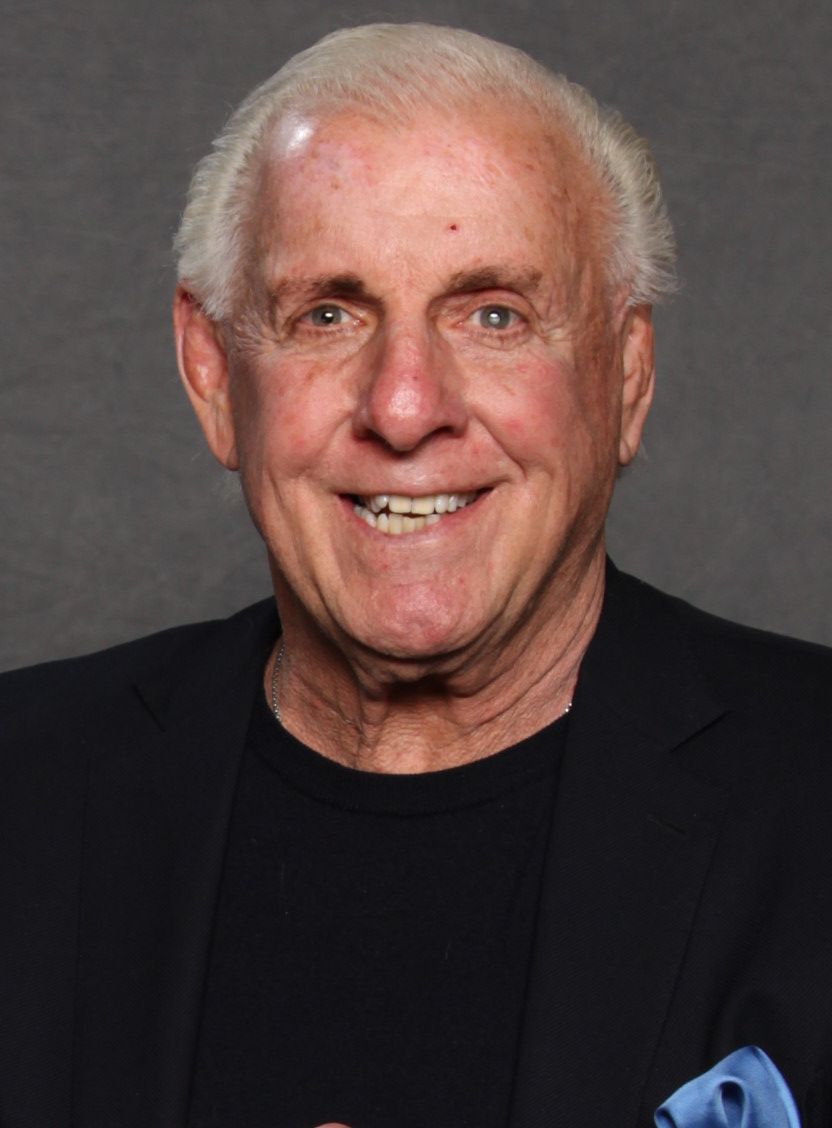
Ric Flair

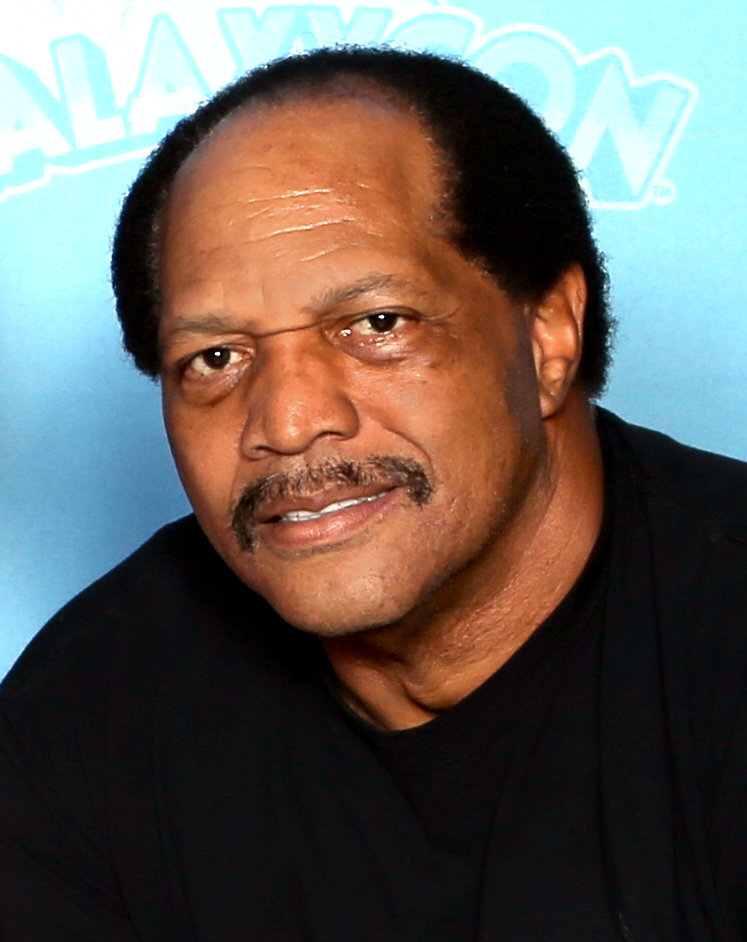
Ron Simmons

- Hulk Hogan (1977–January 27, 2012)
- Mick Foley (1986-January 29, 2012)
- Christina Crawford (July 8, 2010 – 2012)
- Chuck Palumbo (1998-2012)
- Doug Somers (1971 – February 23, 2012)
- Ron Simmons (1986-March 17, 2012)
- Sage Beckett (2007 - June 24, 2012) (return to wrestling in 2014 and retired in 2018)
- Sylvester Terkay (2000 - March 31, 2012)
- Dominic DeNucci (1958-April 14, 2012)
- Kenny Jay (1958-June 16, 2012)
- Tiger Jeet Singh (1965-July 1, 2012)
- Road Warrior Animal (1982-July 17, 2012)
- Tyler Reks (February 2007 – August 22, 2012)
- Jerry Lawler (1970-September 10, 2012, had a heart attack and returned to wrestling in 2013)
- Sara Del Rey (2001 – September 2012) (moved to a trainer)
- Vladimir Kozlov (April 7, 2006 – October 16, 2012)
- Richie Steamboat (July 25, 2008 – October 25, 2012)
- Beth Phoenix (May 2001 – October 29, 2012) (Commentator in NXT, occasional wrestler)
- Ric Flair (December 10, 1972 – December 3, 2012) (full retirement, return for one in 2022 for Ric Flair's Last Match)
- Kelly Kelly (June 13, 2006 – December 4, 2012) (brief return in 2018 - Royal Rumble and WWE Evolution, 2020 event)
- Dave Finlay (1974 – December 22, 2012)

== Deaths ==
- January 12-
  - MS-1 (wrestler), 55
  - Savannah Jack, 63
- February 26 - Don Joyce (American football), 82
- February 29 - Woody Farmer, 76
- March 2 – Doug Furnas, 52
- March 12 - Dick Woehrle, 81
- March 13 - Joe McCarthy, 82
- March 22 - Joe Blanchard, 83
- April 3 – Chief Jay Strongbow, 83
- April 14 - Dom Travis, 31
- May 26 – Hans Schmidt, 87
- June 23 - Adorable Rubí, 68
- July 12 - Dara Singh, 83
- July 16 - Bob Babbitt, 74
- July 20 - Goldie Rogers, 61
- August 12 - Red Bastien, 81
- August 17 - Joey Kovar, 29
- September 29 - Eric Pomeroy, 79
- September 30 – Bobby Jaggers, 64
- October 10 - Alex Karras, 77
- October 18 – Brain Damage, 34
- c. October 19 – Mike Graham, 61
- November 1 – Brad Armstrong, 50
- November 12 - Seigfried Stanke, 74
- November 15 - Awesome Kong, 54
- November 29 – Buddy Roberts, 65
- December 9 - Mike Boyette, 69
- December 22 - Rip Hawk, 82
- December 28 -
  - Bill Dromo, 75
  - Emilio Charles Jr., 56
- December 29 - Argentine Zuma, 85

== See also ==
- List of NJPW pay-per-view events
- List of ROH pay-per-view events
- List of TNA pay-per-view events
- List of WWE pay-per-view events
