= Slammiversary 10 =

2012 Total Nonstop Action Wrestling pay-per-view event

- Promotional poster
- Promotion: Total Nonstop Action Wrestling
- Date: June 10, 2012
- City: Arlington, Texas
- Venue: College Park Center
- Attendance: 5,500
- Tagline: 10 Years of Total Nonstop Action Wrestling

Pay-per-view chronology
← Previous; Sacrifice	Next → Destination X

Slammiversary chronology
← Previous; IX	Next → XI

Slammiversary 10 was a professional wrestling pay-per-view (PPV) event produced by the Total Nonstop Action Wrestling (TNA) promotion, which took place on June 10, 2012 at the College Park Center in Arlington, Texas on the University of Texas at Arlington campus. It was the eighth Pay-Per-View under the Slammiversary chronology, the sixth event in the 2012 TNA PPV schedule, and the company's largest domestically attended PPV at the time. TNA's Lockdown 2013 event drew a larger crowd since.

With TNA having their origins date back to June 2002, the company commemorated and celebrated their 10th anniversary. During the event, history was made as TNA General Manager and wrestling household name Hulk Hogan hosted parts of the show, a special appearance by WWE contracted wrestler and former TNA wrestler, Christian Cage, who was the WWE Intercontinental Champion at the time, had him announce the #1 moment in the history of the company, and most prominently, however, Sting was announced as the first inductee into the newly created TNA Hall of Fame. This would also mark Christian's last appearance in TNA until August 2021, after he won the Impact World Championship, the title that was formerly called the TNA World Heavyweight Championship, on the debut edition of All Elite Wrestling's show Rampage from previous champion Kenny Omega.

Nine professional wrestling matches took place at the event and were broadcast live on pay-per-view. The main event saw TNA World Heavyweight Champion Bobby Roode successfully defend his title against Sting. The undercard also featured acclaimed matches such as A.J Styles and Kurt Angle defeating Kazarian and Christopher Daniels for the TNA World Tag Team Championship, Mr. Anderson defeating Rob Van Dam and Jeff Hardy in a TNA World Title Contender's match, and Austin Aries retaining the TNA X Division Championship by defeating Samoa Joe.

In October 2017, with the launch of the Global Wrestling Network, the event became available to stream on demand.

== Storylines ==
Slammiversary featured nine professional wrestling matches that involved different wrestlers from pre-existing scripted feuds and storylines. Wrestlers portrayed villains, heroes, or less distinguishable characters in the scripted events that built tension and culminated in a wrestling match or series of matches.

The predominant feud on the card was between Bobby Roode and Sting for the TNA World Heavyweight Championship. Back in March at Victory Road, Sting inadvertently harmed himself attempting the Scorpion Death Drop on Roode onto a chair and was defeated by Roode in their match. Following that match, Sting gave up his position as the General Manager of TNA to Hulk Hogan to focus on training back into shape as a full-time wrestler to compete with Bobby Roode on his level. Sting returned during the May 24 episode of Impact Wrestling attacking Roode after his World Title match. During the following week's advertised Lumberjack match, Sting showed how much his training paid off in his momentous in-ring return defeating Roode with the Scorpion Deathlock. Immediately following Sting's non-title victory over the champion, much to the dismay of Roode, Hogan announced that Roode will face Sting for the TNA World Heavyweight Championship at Slammiversary. Later that night, Sting picked up more momentum going into Slammiversary by forcing Roode to submit to the Scorpion Deathlock again in a 6 Man Tag main event.

Another match heading into the event was between Rob Van Dam, Jeff Hardy and Mr. Anderson over contention to the TNA World Heavyweight Championship. On the June 7 episode of Impact Wrestling, TNA GM Hulk Hogan announced that there would be a #1 contender's match between RVD, Hardy and Anderson in a Three Way match and ruled that the winner of this match will face whoever walks out of Slammiversary (either Bobby Roode or Sting) as the TNA World Heavyweight Champion.

Another high-profile match featured TNA World Tag Team Champions Christopher Daniels and Kazarian defending the titles against A.J. Styles and Kurt Angle. In April, Daniels and Kazarian began threatening that they would expose Styles' secret if Styles hadn't done it himself. The next month, due to Styles not complying, Kazarian and Daniels revealed what was an apparent affair between Styles and TNA President Dixie Carter through the use of privately recorded footage and photography. This began the derailment of Styles' focus as a competitor. At Sacrifice, Kazarian and Daniels attacked Styles after his match with Angle, who acted on good conscience to save Styles since he had already fallen into dispute with Daniels a week ago. On the May 17 episode of Impact Wrestling, Styles last eliminated Gunner to win the Open Fight Night Qualifier Battle Royal for the right to call out a champion for a title match. Backstage after the match, Styles declared his relationship with Carter was strictly professional and that they were both separately married, but Daniels who intervened, claimed Styles' relationship with Carter exceeded a professional level when both were on video at a hotel together. The next week Styles faced Bobby Roode for the TNA World Heavyweight Championship and lost because of his disorientation, which in turn, made Roode the record-breaking longest reigning champion under the TNA World Heavyweight Championship belt. After a singles match Styles won over Daniels the following week, Daniels and Kazarian proceeded to beat Styles down post-match. However, Angle evened the odds by helping Styles fend off his two antagonists. It was later announced that the Tag Team Title match between all four would take place at Slammiversary.

Heading into Slammiversary was an angle featuring an Anything Goes match between Bully Ray and Joseph Park. On the March 8 episode of Impact Wrestling, storyline attorney Joseph Park started introducing himself to the TNA roster and staff, and for weeks, began investigating the disappearance of his brother Abyss since the Genesis PPV in January, where he was physically assaulted backstage by Ray after his match. Continuing his probing, Park gradually placed accusation on Bully Ray, who was the opponent of Abyss at Genesis that night. By May, Abyss abruptly returned to warn his brother that he was getting "too close to the fire". Park tried to push Ray's buttons by belittling his status as a bully for having lost to Abyss and others on the roster, but in return, Ray commenced to bully and humiliate Park, viewing him as a coward "lawyer boy" who has no place being in the wrestling business. On the May 24 episode of Impact Wrestling, Ray called out Park who was seated in the audience. Park, intimidated, confronted Ray with his attorney background and judged from all the information gathered, that Ray was guilty in the case of Abyss' disappearance which provoked Ray into attacking him with a chain. The next week, Ray conceded to the guilt of attempting to leave Abyss for dead, a move that angered Park into wanting to fight him, but Ray threatened to sue him if he laid a finger. With Park in a belligerent mood, Ray told Park that they would fight at Slammiversary. On the June 7 episode of Impact Wrestling during the official contract signing, Ray confiscated the standard wrestling contract and presented a different contract that had a hold harmless clause removing all liability for his actions in what would be an Anything Goes match. Initially refusing to sign and gamble his well-being; after being insulted one last time by Ray, Park decided to sign the contract in honor of Abyss. This led to Abyss making a video screen appearance to scold Park for the trouble he caused but also to tell Ray that he was actually alive and well and intending to appear at Slammiversary.

== Event ==
Other on-screen personnel
Role:	Name:
Host	Christian Cage
Commentators	Mike Tenay
Commentators	Taz
Interviewers	Jeremy Borash (Backstage)
Interviewers	Christy Hemme (Following the Knockouts match)
Ring announcers	Jeremy Borash
Referees	Brian Hebner
Referees	Earl Hebner
Referees	Brian Stiffler

=== Preliminary matches ===
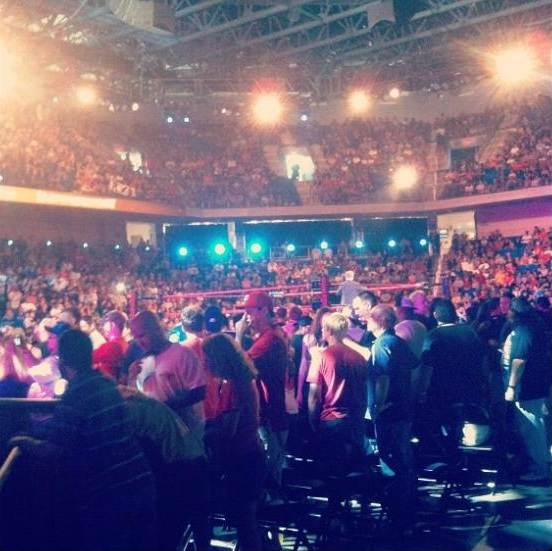
The Slammiversary crowd touted as TNA Wrestling's largest U.S attendance for any televised live event at the time.

The first match of the night saw TNA X Division Champion, Austin Aries defend his title against Samoa Joe. Both began the match testing each other out before they eventually got off to a fired up start with Aries sending vicious onslaughts to Joe, who retorted with some of his own. The match gave way to plenty of traded offense such as high points where Aries hit a suicide dive to Joe on the outside of the ring and later in the ring a 450 splash, and Joe subsequently connected with knee lifts, a powerbomb, and submission holds on Aries. At the end, Joe attempted a muscle buster out of the corner of the ring, but Aries escaped hitting some offensive maneuvers that led up to him lifting a 280-pound Joe off his feet for a brainbuster, before pinning him for the victory.

In the next match, Hernandez and Kid Kash returned to the company to face off in an additional match placed on the line-up of the event. Hernandez dominated the early goings by overpowering Kash as the bigger man of the two. After attempting an aerial move in which Kash dodged, Kash turned the match in his favor for a while taking down Hernandez with some chops and unexpected high flying offense. Due to his growing cockiness, however, Hernandez regained control of the match, eventually hitting his top rope Big Man Dive on Kash outside the ring. The end came when Hernandez overcame Kash's comebacks, set him up center ring, and landed a diving splash on him to get the winning pinfall.

Devon and Garett up against Robbie E and Rob Terry was next. Robbie kicked things off with Garett, who outdid Robbie with some basic wrestling holds. Terry was tagged in by Robbie, resisting all blows coming from Garett and kept flinging him away for his troubles. Suddenly, Madison Rayne emerged on stage appearing fascinated with the match. Robbie and Terry withheld Garett from any contact with his partner Devon and proceeded to beat on him. When Devon broke up a pin attempt on Garett, Rayne smiled on stage. Gradually, Devon was tagged in and took down his opponents. The match concluded when Devon hit a shoulder tackle on Robbie and pinned for the win.

The fourth match of the night was between Jeff Hardy, Mr. Anderson, and Rob Van Dam competing over contention to the TNA World Heavyweight Championship. The match began with Hardy attacking Van Dam. Several spots were seen between all three men which included Hardy using a grounded Anderson as leverage to execute a running leg smash on Van Dam in the ring corner, Anderson hitting a superplex off on Hardy, and Van Dam missing a Five-Star Frog Splash. All three continued back and forth in exchanging offense. However, in the end, Anderson cleared the ring of Hardy and connected with the Mic Check on Van Dam to get the pinfall victory.

Out to the ring was Crimson to speak on behalf of his Open Challenge match and putting his long running winning streak on the line. Cocky, Crimson declared that no matter the challenger, no one would beat him. After a momentary wait, James Storm, ending a two-month absence due to a frustrating loss at Lockdown, answered the challenge. With steaming momentum, Storm fought off Crimson, who had a brief comeback period. But Storm proved to be too much, firing up the crowd, hitting Crimson with the Last Call, and effectively ceased his undefeated streak.

From Texas, it was Tessmacher successfully battling the champion Gail Kim for the TNA Knockouts Championship in the next match. This match went back and forth until Kim took over after dropping Tessmacher on the ropes. Kim's cockiness proved to be a factor of fault as she cut off most of Tessmacher's attempts to gain control, but ultimately fell victim to a victory roll that gave Tessmacher the shock victory in her home state.

=== Main events ===
Bully Ray went up against Joseph Park in an Anything Goes match. Ray allowed Park to attempt the first attacks, but easily ducked every swing made. Continuing to humiliate him in such manner, Ray added insult by slapping him, spitting at him, and calling him a "coward". Park eventually managed to land a slap on Ray, but his celebration that followed allowed Ray to blindside him. Park subsequently got back in the driver's seat of the match when Ray brought a chair in the ring, but Park had kicked the ropes that vibrated and tripped Ray. From there, Park armed himself with the chair while Ray implored Park not to charge him, and as soon as he turned his back, Ray attacked him down again. Later, Ray set up a table in the ring and tried to hit Park with a kendo stick, but Park had moved in quicker for a lucky gut punch. Park caned Ray with the kendo stick and went for the pin but to no avail. Charging after Ray, Park got knocked to the outside of the ring. Rolling under the ring and disappearing from sight, Abyss emerged from under another side of the ring. Abyss stalked Ray from behind in the ring and chokeslammed Ray through the table. After Abyss disappeared back under the ring, Park reappeared looking confused, stumbled back in the ring, and got the pinfall win over Ray.

In the penultimate main event of the night, A.J Styles and Kurt Angle successfully dethroned the champions Christopher Daniels and Kazarian for the TNA World Tag Team Championship. Daniels and Kazarian cut off Styles as soon as the match was underway. The inception of the match saw Styles having a victorious wrestling exchange with Kazarian, ridding the ring of his adversary. With action taken to the outside, Styles hit an aerial maneuver on Kazarian and Angle took out Daniels in the meantime. Back in the ring, Styles tagged in Angle, who worked on breaking down Kaz and Daniels before tagging Styles back in. Styles fought back and forth with Kazarian until Daniels became enough of a distraction, leading to the two working him over for a period of time. But as soon as Angle eventually got the hot tag, it was two against a machine when Angle started giving out various German suplexes and throws. When Angle went to German suplex Kazarian, an assist from Styles gave way for a double German suplex on both Kazarian and Daniels. Later, Styles and Kazarian tagged in, but Styles cleaned house. After a few sequences, it was Daniels and Styles fighting mid-ring with Daniels prevailing. Daniels attempted the Best Moonsault Ever on Styles, but landed on his feet when Styles moved out of the way just as Daniels backed into a German suplex from Angle. Leading to the finish, Angle connected with a frog splash on Kazarian for a two count due to Daniels hauling the referee out of the ring. Aware, Styles launched himself over the ropes with a springboard shooting star onto Daniels. Back in the ring, Kazarian went for the Fade to Black on Angle, but Angle countered it, locked on and grapevined the ankle lock, which after Kazarian tried desperately to get to the ropes, forced him to tap out making Angle and Styles the winners of the match.

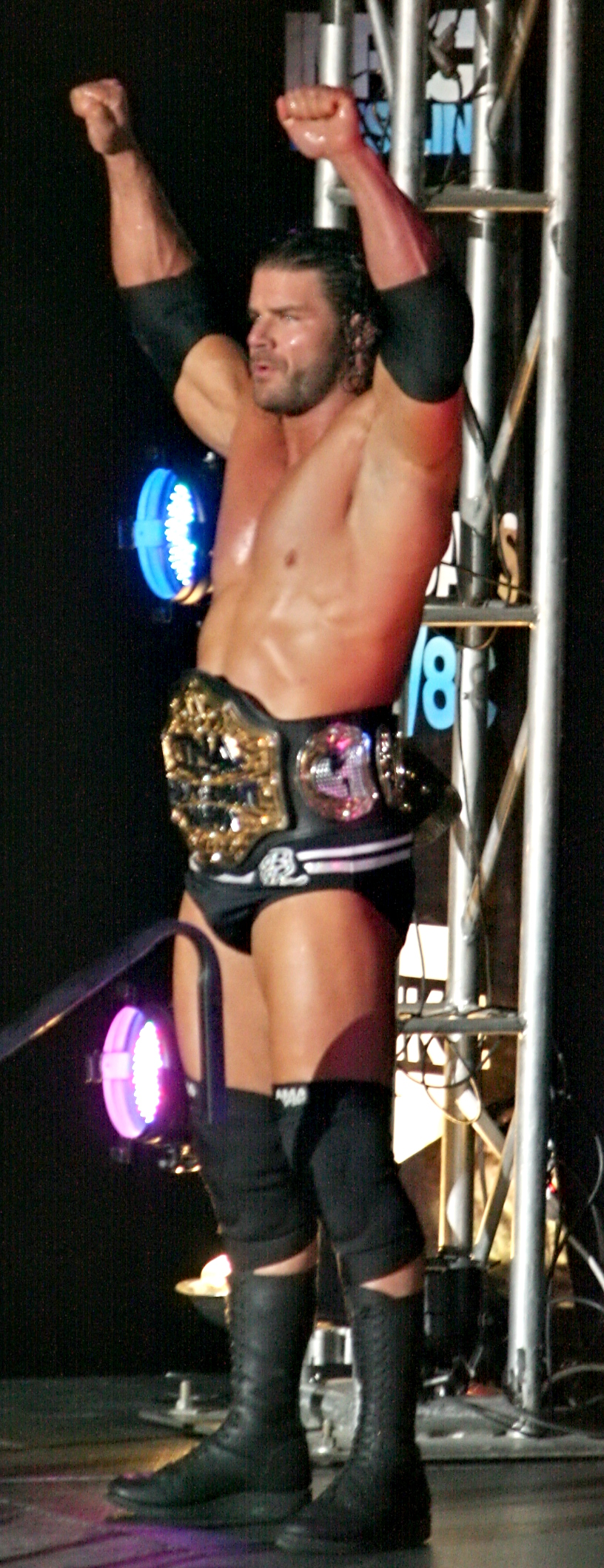
Roode as the TNA World Heavyweight Champion.

The main event of the night saw Bobby Roode successfully defend the TNA World Heavyweight Championship against Sting. As the match was set to begin, Roode went to the outside of the ring to stall Sting momentarily after the formal main event introductions. Not having that happen, Sting successfully pursued Roode, ramming him into the guardrail in the process. Back in the ring, some blows to the mid region, a hip toss, and an attempted Scorpion Deathlock had Roode scrambling out of the ring quickly to break any Sting momentum. Sting went after him sending him into the ring steps. Not long and Roode trapped Sting in the ring to take control by stomping and picking him apart. Later, Sting hit a superplex on Roode from the top turnbuckle and then applied the Scorpion Deathlock to success. However, Roode was able to grab the bottom rope desperately and slid out of the ring to recover his back. Sting stayed on the attack with Roode trying to escape him. The match soon ended up by the broadcast table as staff scrammed to safety. Sting snapped on the Scorpion Deathlock on Roode on the table, where Roode tapped out. Moreover, the fall would not be sanctioned since the submission was not taking place in the ring. Sting, who released the hold, inexplicably thought he had won. This confusion gave Roode time to set up the conclusion. Roode retrieved James Storm's six-pack beer left out in the arena and first teased a bottle shot that served as a distraction to Sting and the referee who got rid of it. During that time, Roode pulled out another bottle and smashed Sting over the head with it. Roode made the pin and the oblivious referee returned to count the pinfall victory for Roode. After the match, a bloodied Sting went out in style attacking Roode from the ring all the way up to the ramp, where he executed the Scorpion Death Drop on Roode off the stage. In the end, Sting stood tall as the event came to a close.

== Reception ==
Slammiversary was met primarily with positive reviews. Matt Bishop from the SLAM! Sports pro wrestling section of Canadian Online Explorer rated the event a perfect 10 out of 10, higher than the previous year's 7 out of 10, stating that "TNA celebrated its 10th anniversary in style, which turned out to be one of the best pay-per-views in the company's recent history". Matches were rated between 5–9 out of 10 with the highest rated being both the Styles/Angle versus Daniels/Kazarian TNA World Tag Team Title match and Aries versus Joe X Division Title match both getting a solid 9 out of 10. The RVD/Hardy/Anderson match received 8 out of 10 and the Sting/Roode World Title main event got 7 out of 10.

Daily Star author Patrick Lennon said, "The special Slammiversary at the weekend was a fine wrestling show, and a timely reminder of what this company can achieve when it focuses on its strengths, and crucially on being original".

The writer of the Slammiversary report on 411 Mania, Colin Rinehart, rated the event an 8 out of 10 which was higher than last year's event that was given 7 out of 10. Rinehart stated, "This show was far better than I was expecting as the card looked solid but unspectacular going in. Every match I was looking forward to delivered here though and even some of the matches I wasn't anticipating wound up being pretty good. Throw in some really cool moments like Christian showing up, the Hall of Fame announcement, and the final bump to end the show and this wound up being a pretty damn good show tonight. Easy thumbs up." On top of this, Rinehart gave the show a strong 8 out of 10.

A publication from the University of Texas at Arlington newspaper, The Shorthorn, gave accounts of many residents that expressed desire to see the company return for future events, highlighting their experience as "money's worth" and "one of the best wrestling shows" they've seen.

== Results ==
No.	Results	Stipulations	Times
1	Austin Aries (c) defeated Samoa Joe	Singles match for the TNA X Division Championship	11:44
2	Hernandez defeated Kid Kash	Singles match	05:52
3	Devon and Garett Bischoff defeated Robbie E and Robbie T	Tag team match	05:56
4	Mr. Anderson defeated Jeff Hardy and Rob Van Dam	Three-Way match to determine the #1 contender for the TNA World Heavyweight Championship	11:25
5	James Storm defeated Crimson	Singles match	02:11
6	Miss. Tessmacher defeated Gail Kim (c)	Singles match for the TNA Knockouts Championship	06:44
7	Joseph Park defeated Bully Ray	No Disqualification match	10:25
8	A.J. Styles and Kurt Angle defeated Bad Influence (Christopher Daniels and Kazarian) (c) by submission	Tag team match for the TNA World Tag Team Championship	14:25
9	Bobby Roode (c) defeated Sting	Singles match for the TNA World Heavyweight Championship	10:55
(c) / – the champion(s) heading into the match

== See also ==
- 2012 in professional wrestling
