= Showdown in the Sun =

2012 Ring of Honor pay-per-view event

- Promotional poster featuring (left to right) Jay Lethal, Michael Elgin, ROH World Champion Davey Richards, Eddie Edwards and Kevin Steen
- Promotion: Ring of Honor
- Date: March 30 – 31, 2012
- City: Fort Lauderdale, Florida
- Venue: War Memorial Auditorium

Pay-per-view chronology
← Previous; 10th Anniversary Show: Young Wolves Rising	Next → Border Wars

WrestleMania Weekend chronology
← Previous; Honor Takes Center Stage	Next → Supercard of Honor VII

Showdown in the Sun was a professional wrestling pay-per-view (PPV) event produced by Ring of Honor (ROH) that took place over two consecutive days: Friday, March 30 and Saturday, March 31, 2012, at the War Memorial Auditorium in Fort Lauderdale, Florida.

== Production ==
Other on-screen personnel
Role	Name
Commentators	Kevin Kelly
Commentators	Nigel McGuinness

=== Storylines ===
Showdown in the Sun featured a total of seventeen different professional wrestling matches in two different nights involving different wrestlers from pre-existing scripted feuds, plots, and storylines that played out on Ring of Honor's (ROH) television programs. Wrestlers portrayed villains or heroes as they followed a series of events that built tension and culminated in a wrestling match or series of matches.

All three of Ring of Honor's championships were defended throughout the course of the weekend. The ROH World Championship was defended in a three-way match between champion Davey Richards, his former tag team partner Eddie Edwards and their mutual long-term rival Roderick Strong. All three wrestlers were scheduled for a "Blind Destiny" match on the second day, with the winner having to defend the championship against their respective opponent: Michael Elgin, Kevin Steen and Jay Lethal. ROH World Television Champion Jay Lethal defended his title against Kyle O'Reilly on the first day, while the ROH World Tag Team Championship were defended on the second day, by the Briscoe Brothers (Jay and Mark) against former champions Wrestling's Greatest Tag Team (Charlie Haas and Shelton Benjamin). Also on the card, the Young Bucks (Nick and Matt Jackson) faced the All Night Express (Kenny King and Rhett Titus) in tag team matches on both nights, with differing stipulations.

Guest competitors not contracted to Ring of Honor also wrestled in matches over the weekend, most notably former WWE, World Championship Wrestling, and Extreme Championship Wrestling star Lance Storm, former ROH star and (at the time) NWA World Heavyweight Champion Adam Pearce, and Fire Ant, who was representing the Chikara promotion (with whom ROH has a talent exchange agreement).

== Technical issues ==
Viewers watching the show via internet pay-per-view through GoFightLive.tv suffered numerous technical issues during the show. During the showdown between former Future Shock partners, Adam Cole and Kyle O'Reilly, the stream went dead and officials began trying to fix the problem while O'Reilly and Cole made impromptu speeches to delay the show. When it became apparent the technical issues with the stream wouldn't be immediately solved, the match continued as originally planned. Other segments were also not aired live due to these technical faults.

ROH posted the matches on their official YouTube channel and have since stopped promoting their iPPVs through GoFightLive.tv. From the following iPPV, Border Wars, ROH began airing the events on their website.

== Results ==
Day #1 (March 30)
No.	Results	Stipulations	Times
1^{D}	Bruce Santee (c) defeated Wes Brisco	Singles match for the NWA Ring Warriors Grand Championship	—
2	The Briscoe Brothers (Jay Briscoe and Mark Briscoe) defeated TMDK (Mikey Nicholls and Shane Haste)	Proving Ground tag team match	7:19
3	Adam Cole defeated Adam Pearce	Singles match	4:35
4	The All Night Express (Rhett Titus and Kenny King) defeated The Young Bucks (Matt Jackson and Nick Jackson)	Tornado tag team match	8:33
5	Jay Lethal (c) defeated Kyle O'Reilly	Singles match for the ROH World Television Championship	11:28
6	Wrestling's Greatest Tag Team (Charlie Haas and Shelton Benjamin) defeated Caprice Coleman and Cedric Alexander	Tag team match	11:19
7	Mike Bennett (with Maria Kanellis) defeated Lance Storm	Singles match	16:20
8	Kevin Steen defeated El Generico	Last Man Standing match	24:07
9	Davey Richards (c) defeated Eddie Edwards and Roderick Strong (with Truth Martini)	Three-way elimination match for the ROH World Championship	21:03
(c) / – the champion(s) heading into the match; D / – this was a dark match

Day #2 (March 31)
No.	Results	Stipulations	Times
1	Jimmy Jacobs defeated El Generico	Singles match	8:01
2	Tommaso Ciampa defeated Cedric Alexander (with Caprice Coleman)	Singles match	5:30
3	T. J. Perkins defeated Fire Ant	Singles match	8:21
4	Kyle O'Reilly defeated Adam Cole	Singles match	—
5	The Young Bucks (Matt Jackson and Nick Jackson) defeated The All Night Express (Rhett Titus and Kenny King)	Tag team street fight	—
6	The Briscoe Brothers (Jay Briscoe and Mark Briscoe) (c) defeated Wrestling's Greatest Tag Team (Charlie Haas and Shelton Benjamin)	Tag team match for the ROH World Tag Team Championship	15:19
7	Kevin Steen defeated Eddie Edwards	Singles match	11:00
8	Roderick Strong (with Truth Martini) defeated Jay Lethal (c)	Singles match for the ROH World Television Championship	13:20
9	Davey Richards (c) defeated Michael Elgin	Singles match for the ROH World Championship	26:33
(c) / – the champion(s) heading into the match

== See also ==
- 2012 in professional wrestling
- List of Ring of Honor pay-per-view events
