= No Surrender (2012) =

2012 Total Nonstop Action Wrestling pay-per-view event

- Promotional poster featuring various TNA wrestlers.
- Promotion: Total Nonstop Action Wrestling
- Date: September 9, 2012
- City: Orlando, Florida
- Venue: Impact Zone
- Attendance: 1,100

Pay-per-view chronology
← Previous; Hardcore Justice	Next → Bound for Glory

No Surrender chronology
← Previous; 2011	Next → 2013

The 2012 No Surrender was a professional wrestling pay-per-view event produced by Total Nonstop Action Wrestling (TNA) that took place on September 9, 2012 at the Impact Wrestling Zone in Orlando, Florida. It was the eighth and final annual No Surrender under its chronology. The event hosted the culmination of the Bound for Glory Series, which determined the number one contender for the TNA World Heavyweight Championship at Bound for Glory.

In October 2017, with the launch of the Global Wrestling Network, the event became available to stream on demand.

== Storylines ==
Other on-screen personnel
Commentator	Mike Tenay
Commentator	Taz
Ring announcer	Jeremy Borash
Referee	Rudy Charles
Referee	Mark "Slick" Johnson
Referee	Andrew Thomas
Interviewers	Jeremy Borash

No Surrender featured seven professional wrestling matches that involved different wrestlers from pre-existing scripted feuds and storylines. Wrestlers portrayed villains, heroes, or less distinguishable characters in the scripted events that built tension and culminated in a wrestling match or series of matches.

The primary matches on the card center around the conclusion of the Bound for Glory Series. The top four in the standings based on points were James Storm, Samoa Joe, Bully Ray, and Jeff Hardy. As the final four, they advanced to the one night tournament at the PPV that will determine the ultimate winner. As points leader, Storm had the option to choose his opponent in the semi-finals, and selected Bully Ray (due to Ray making accusations about Storm being involved with Aces & Eights and because in the previous year, Bully Ray beat James Storm in a Bound for Glory semi-final match), leaving Joe vs Hardy as the other semi-final. The winners of those matches will meet in the finals where the winner receives a TNA World Heavyweight Championship match at Bound for Glory.

Another major match on the card features TNA World Champion Austin Aries challenging any member of Aces & Eights to a fight. After weeks of attacks on Aries by the renegade group, Aries had threatened a lower level member of the group in exchange for a fight at the PPV, specifically targeting the large enforcer known as "Arm Breaker".

Another storyline on the card features Rob Van Dam going against Magnus. After Van Dam was eliminated from the final four, Magnus mocked him in backstage by saying that Van Dam can't reach the bar anymore and isn't the man he once was, which resulted in Van Dam punching Magnus in the face. They start fighting until Security run in to separate them.

The top midcard match features Christopher Daniels and Kazarian defending the TNA World Tag Team Championship against former champions AJ Styles and Kurt Angle. After the revelation that Daniels and Kazarian had fabricated the whole Claire Lynch pregnancy story to blackmail Styles, Styles vowed revenge, and is using his rematch clause to challenge for the titles that Daniels and Kazarian won from Styles and Angle in June.

== Results ==
No.	Results	Stipulations	Times
1	Jeff Hardy defeated Samoa Joe	2012 Bound for Glory Series Semi-Final match	12:34
2	Bully Ray defeated James Storm	2012 Bound for Glory Series Semi-Final match	13:54
3	Miss. Tessmacher (c) defeated Tara	Singles match for the TNA Women's Knockout Championship	06:55
4	Zema Ion (c) defeated Sonjay Dutt	Singles match for the TNA X Division Championship	11:32
5	Rob Van Dam defeated Magnus	Singles match	10:07
6	Bad Influence (Christopher Daniels and Kazarian) (c) defeated A.J. Styles and Kurt Angle	Tag Team match for the TNA World Tag Team Championship	19:30
7	Jeff Hardy defeated Bully Ray	2012 Bound for Glory Series final match	12:23
(c) / – the champion(s) heading into the match

== See also ==
- 2012 in professional wrestling
