= TNA Sacrifice (2012) =

2012 Total Nonstop Action Wrestling pay-per-view event

Sacrifice (2012)
- Promotional poster featuring Rob Terry
- Promotion: Total Nonstop Action Wrestling
- Date: May 13, 2012
- City: Orlando, Florida
- Venue: Impact Zone
- Attendance: 1,100

Pay-per-view chronology
← Previous; Lockdown	Next → Slammiversary 10

Sacrifice chronology
← Previous; 2011	Next → 2014

The 2012 Sacrifice was a professional wrestling pay-per-view (PPV) event produced by the Total Nonstop Action Wrestling (TNA) promotion, which took place on May 13, 2012 at the Impact Wrestling Zone in Orlando, Florida. It was the eighth under the Sacrifice chronology and fifth event in the 2012 TNA PPV schedule.

In the main event, Bobby Roode defeated Rob Van Dam in a Ladder match to retain the TNA World Heavyweight Championship. Other matches that preceded the final bout were Kurt Angle defeating A.J Styles, Austin Aries defeating Bully Ray, and Crimson defeating Eric Young, all in a singles match. Also, Devon defeated Robbie E and Robbie T to retain his TNA Television Championship, Gail Kim defeated Brooke Tessmacher to retain her TNA Women's Knockout Championship, and Christopher Daniels and Kazarian defeated Samoa Joe and Magnus to win the TNA World Tag Team Championship.

In October 2017, with the launch of the Global Wrestling Network, the event became available to stream on demand.

== Storylines ==
Other on-screen personnel
Commentator	Mike Tenay
Commentator	Taz
Ring announcer	Jeremy Borash
Referee	Rudy Charles
Referee	Mark "Slick" Johnson
Referee	Andrew Thomas
Interviewers	Jeremy Borash

Sacrifice featured eight professional wrestling matches that involved different wrestlers from pre-existing scripted feuds and storylines. Wrestlers portrayed villains, heroes, or less distinguishable characters in the scripted events that built tension and culminated in a wrestling match or series of matches.

The primary storyline heading into Sacrifice was between defending champion Bobby Roode and Rob Van Dam, competing for the TNA World Heavyweight Championship in a Ladder match. At Lockdown, Bobby Roode defeated James Storm in a Cage match to retain the TNA World Heavyweight championship after Storm accidentally hit him with the Last Call superkick sending Roode out of the cage. On the following episode of Impact Wrestling, as a result of high emotions, Storm took time away to contemplate the future of his career after TNA General Manager Hulk Hogan made a number one contenders match between Jeff Hardy and Mr. Anderson, but later added Van Dam to the match making it a Triple threat match. That night, Van Dam defeated both Hardy and Anderson to become the number one contender to the title. On the May 10 episode of Impact, when Van Dam started a brawl with Roode that brought out Anderson and Hardy to join in, Hogan made a Four Way match between Van Dam, Roode, Hardy, and Anderson, with stipulations – If Hardy won he would replace Van Dam at Sacrifice, if Anderson won he would also replace Van Dam, if Roode won he would earn the right to choose his opponent, and if Van Dam won he would retain his spot and get to choose the stipulation for his championship match. Van Dam won the match and chose a Ladder match for his match against Roode at Sacrifice.

One main match at the Sacrifice PPV was A.J. Styles versus Kurt Angle. On the April 19 episode of Impact, Angle, not too pleased about the outcome, defeated Styles in a match as a result of a distraction by Styles' adversaries Christopher Daniels and Kazarian, who gave Styles a paper document containing apparently confidential information. The next week, Angle threatened Daniels and Kazarian about taking action against them if they interfered again in one of his matches. Angle teamed with Daniels and Kazarian during a six-man tag team match the following week, where after losing the match, fell into a dispute with Daniels. Essentially, the Styles-Angle rematch was set for Sacrifice.

Entering the event was a feud between Austin Aries and Bully Ray. On the April 26 Open Fight Night episode of Impact Wrestling, Ray lost an open fight to his former tag partner and TNA Television Champion Devon after he was called out for a title match. Aries ridiculed Ray for his loss, and the next week, while Ray had already begun bullying storyline attorney Joseph Park and then started picking on announcer Jeremy Borash for calling his recently fired Immortal associate Eric Bischoff a "prick", Aries came out for the save. During a mutual put-down argument, which saw Ray criticize Aries for his lighter size and Aries bag on Ray's former supernumerary weight, Aries stood up to Bully Ray by starting a brawl which ended in Ray's favor when security intervened.

Another feud continued as Robbie E faced Robbie T and defending champion Devon in a Three Way match for the TNA Television Championship. At Lockdown, Devon retained the TNA Television Championship against Robbie E in a rematch from Victory Road, where Robbie E lost the title to him. On the May 3 episode of Impact, Robbie E interfered to help his ally Robbie T in his TV Title match with Devon, who kept his title due to a disqualification victory. Devon went on to retain his title once again by defeating Robbie E the next week.

A Knockouts feud featured at the event was Brooke Tessmacher taking on defending champion Gail Kim for the TNA Women's Knockout Championship. Over two weeks, Tessmacher pinned Kim in their matches including their second that only involved two of them in a non-title match. On the May 3 edition of Impact, Velvet Sky told Tessmacher that Kim was a cheater, but Tessmacher felt either one of them would beat Kim for her title. That night, Tessmacher teamed with sky to defeat Kim and Madison Rayne, by pinning Kim once again. Tessmacher defeated Sky the following week in a match before Kim attacked her setting up the match for the PPV.

A tag team match featured at the event was Christopher Daniels and Kazarian going head-to-head with defending champions Samoa Joe and Magnus. On the May 3 episode of Impact, Daniels and Kazarian were originally scheduled to face Joe and Magnus for the tag titles, but were replaced by Mr. Anderson and Jeff Hardy. The next week, Daniels and Kazarian stated that they would compete for the titles at Sacrifice.

== Reception ==
Sacrifice was met with mostly mixed to positive reviews. Matt Bishop of the SLAM! Sports pro wrestling section on Canadian Online Explorer rated the event an 8 out of 10 which was higher than the previous year's 5 out of 10 rating. Bishop said in giving props to the TNA World Heavyweight Championship match, "That match highlighted an excellent card that also saw tremendous matches between Bully Ray and Austin Aries and Kurt Angle and AJ Styles. The lowest rated match was 4 out of 10 given to the Devon-Robbie E-Robbie T match, while the highest rated matches were the Tag Team Title match that got 7 out of 10, the Ray-Aries match getting 9 out of 10, the Styles-Angle match which got 8 out of 10, and the Roode-Van Dam main event that received 7.5 out of 10.

411 Mania wrestling section writer Colin Rinehart rated the event 7 out of 10 essentially higher than last year's event that got 6.5 out of 10. Rinehart shared his outlook on the event saying, "Well I said that as long as all of the main matches on this show delivered in one way or another I'd be a satisfied customer, and that's exactly what happened. The tag title opener was solid if unspectacular, Aries/Ray was an outstanding slice of superb storytelling, Styles/Angle was its usual goodness, and the main event delivered the high spot fest fun you expect from a ladder match. Everything else was pretty disposable, but I doubt anyone bought this show for the TV title match. Solid show with a good crowd for once (unlike Lockdown last month) and a pretty easy Thumbs Up even if there was nothing amazing here."

Dave Meltzer of the Wrestling Observer Newsletter thought of the show as an, "easy thumbs up show", further saying, "I will admit to be bored through some of the early parts of it. That wasn't necessarily due to the show not being good, but mainly because I'm rather cold on the product at the moment...Things really picked up for the last three matches. Austin Aries had his breakout match in TNA tonight. If, and that's a big IF, TNA follows up on it properly, they may have something here with Austin Aries."

== Results ==
No.	Results	Stipulations	Times
1	Bad Influence (Christopher Daniels and Kazarian) defeated Magnus and Samoa Joe (c)	Tag team match for the TNA World Tag Team Championship	10:52
2	Gail Kim (c) defeated Brooke Tessmacher	Singles match for the TNA Women's Knockout Championship	07:15
3	Devon (c) defeated Robbie E and Robbie T	Three-Way match for the TNA Television Championship	05:25
4	Mr. Anderson defeated Jeff Hardy	Singles match	11:38
5	Crimson defeated Eric Young (with ODB)	Singles match	06:04
6	Austin Aries defeated Bully Ray by submission	Singles match	13:18
7	Kurt Angle defeated A.J. Styles by submission	Singles match	20:43
8	Bobby Roode (c) defeated Rob Van Dam	Ladder match for the TNA World Heavyweight Championship	15:27
(c) / – the champion(s) heading into the match

== See also ==
- 2012 in professional wrestling
