= Hardcore Justice (2012) =

2012 Total Nonstop Action Wrestling pay-per-view event

- Promotional poster featuring an x-ray in the background
- Promotion: Total Nonstop Action Wrestling
- Date: August 12, 2012
- City: Orlando, Florida
- Venue: Impact Zone
- Attendance: 1,100
- Tagline: "It's not always about winning - it's about surviving"

Pay-per-view chronology
← Previous; Destination X	Next → No Surrender

Hardcore Justice chronology
← Previous; 2011	Next → 2013

The 2012 Hardcore Justice was a professional wrestling pay-per-view (PPV) event produced by Total Nonstop Action Wrestling (TNA) promotion, which took place on August 12, 2012 at the Impact Wrestling Zone in Orlando, Florida. It was the eighth and final event under the Hardcore Justice chronology.

In October 2017, with the launch of the Global Wrestling Network, the event became available to stream on demand.

== Storylines ==
Other on-screen personnel
Commentator	Mike Tenay
Commentator	Taz
Ring announcer	Jeremy Borash
Referee	Rudy Charles
Referee	Mark "Slick" Johnson
Referee	Andrew Thomas
Interviewers	Jeremy Borash

Hardcore Justice featured eight professional wrestling matches that involved different wrestlers from pre-existing scripted feuds and storylines. Wrestlers portrayed villains, heroes, or less distinguishable characters in the scripted events that built tension and culminated in a wrestling match or series of matches.

The primary rivalry that was featured at Hardcore Justice centered on Bobby Roode and defending champion Austin Aries, competing over the TNA World Heavyweight Championship. At Destination X, Roode was dispossessed of the TNA World Championship in an upset that saw Aries win the title, ending Roode's record-breaking 256-day reign. On the following televised episode of Impact Wrestling, Roode, emotionally distraught in response to his loss, felt that Aries' victory at the PPV was nothing more than a "fluke" and approached TNA General Manager, Hulk Hogan, to get a rematch at Hardcore Justice. On the August 9 episode of Impact Wrestling, both Aries and Roode agreed during the scheduled contract signing that after the pay-per-view match, if Aries won, Roode would not receive another rematch and in case Aries lost, he would waive his rematch clause.

Another feud going into Hardcore Justice is between Kenny King and defending champion Zema Ion, competing over the TNA X Division Championship. At Destination X, Zema Ion won the TNA X Division Championship following a tournament which led to an Ultimate X match to determine a new champion. On the July 26 edition of Impact Wrestling, Austin Aries, in recurring backstage segments throughout the night, spoke with those who partook in the tournament, Kenny King, Sonjay Dutt, Dakota Darsow and Rashad Cameron on who should receive a shot at the X Division Championship based on their qualifications. Coming down to King and Dutt, Aries selected King as the best choice since Dutt (an X Division veteran) had been injured. That night, King faced Ion for the title; however, Roode interfered in the match, helping Ion to retain the X Division Championship. The following week, Aries and King teamed in a successful effort against Roode and Ion, with King (who got the pin on Ion) later earning himself a title rematch with Ion at Hardcore Justice.

During the event, the Bound For Glory Series tournament will be highlighted, featuring three different four-way matches. Each match will have its own hardcore stipulation (Ladder, Tables match, and Falls Count Anywhere respectively), and the winner of each match will get 20 points in the BFG Series standings. Those matches include A.J. Styles, Christopher Daniels, Samoa Joe, and Kurt Angle in a Ladder match, James Storm, Bully Ray, Jeff Hardy, and Robbie E in a Tables match, and D'Angelo Dinero, Magnus, Mr. Anderson, and Rob Van Dam in a Falls Count Anywhere match.

Another feud entering Hardcore Justice surrounds Chavo Guerrero and Hernandez battling Kid Kash and Gunner. Guerrero made his debut appearance on the July 26 edition of Impact, humbly proud to be a part of TNA and citing the Guerrero family as being champions in wrestling, something he'd also like to accomplish in the company. When Kid Kash interrupted and undermined the Guerrero family, a brawl ensued leaving Guerrero on his own until Hernandez evened out the playing field by aiding Guerrero against Kash and Gunner. The next week, Guerrero went on to defeat Kash in his debut match.

A Knockouts match scheduled for the event is Madison Rayne taking on defending champion Miss Tessmacher for the TNA Women's Knockout Championship. Several weeks prior, Madison Rayne conceded to secretly admiring a particular person within the company. On the July 5 edition of Impact Wrestling, it was revealed to be referee Earl Hebner when she kissed him after he officiated a match. Earl Hebner started favoring Madison, giving her and Gail Kim the win over Mickie James and Tara in a Tag Team match, despite James having actually won the match. On the August 2 edition of Impact, Hebner repeated his actions, allowing Rayne to beat Tara, James, and Kim in a four-way match for a shot at the Knockout Championship.

== Results ==
No.	Results	Stipulations	Times
1	Chavo Guerrero and Hernandez defeated Gunner and Kid Kash	Tag Team match	09:24
2	Rob Van Dam defeated Magnus and Mr. Anderson	Falls Count Anywhere match for 20 points in the Bound for Glory Series standings	09:14
3	Devon (c) defeated Kazarian	Singles match for the TNA Television Championship	08:33
4	Madison Rayne defeated Miss. Tessmacher (c)	Singles match for the TNA Women's Knockout Championship	05:56
5	Bully Ray defeated James Storm, Jeff Hardy and Robbie E	Tables match for 20 points in the Bound for Glory Series standings	13:45
6	Zema Ion (c) defeated Kenny King	Singles match for the TNA X Division Championship	11:06
7	A.J. Styles defeated Christopher Daniels, Kurt Angle and Samoa Joe	Ladder match for 20 points in the Bound for Glory Series standings	16:22
8	Austin Aries (c) defeated Bobby Roode	Singles match for the TNA World Heavyweight Championship The loser of the match was barred from receiving a rematch	24:36
(c) / – the champion(s) heading into the match

== See also ==
- 2012 in professional wrestling
