= Singles match =

Singles match may refer to:

- Matches involving two players competing one-on-one in sports such as;
  - Singles (tennis)
  - Singles (pickleball)
  - Singles match (professional wrestling)
- Singles match play in golf

== See also ==
- Dating, a stage of a romantic relationship
