= Brooke Tessmacher =

American professional wrestler (born 1984)

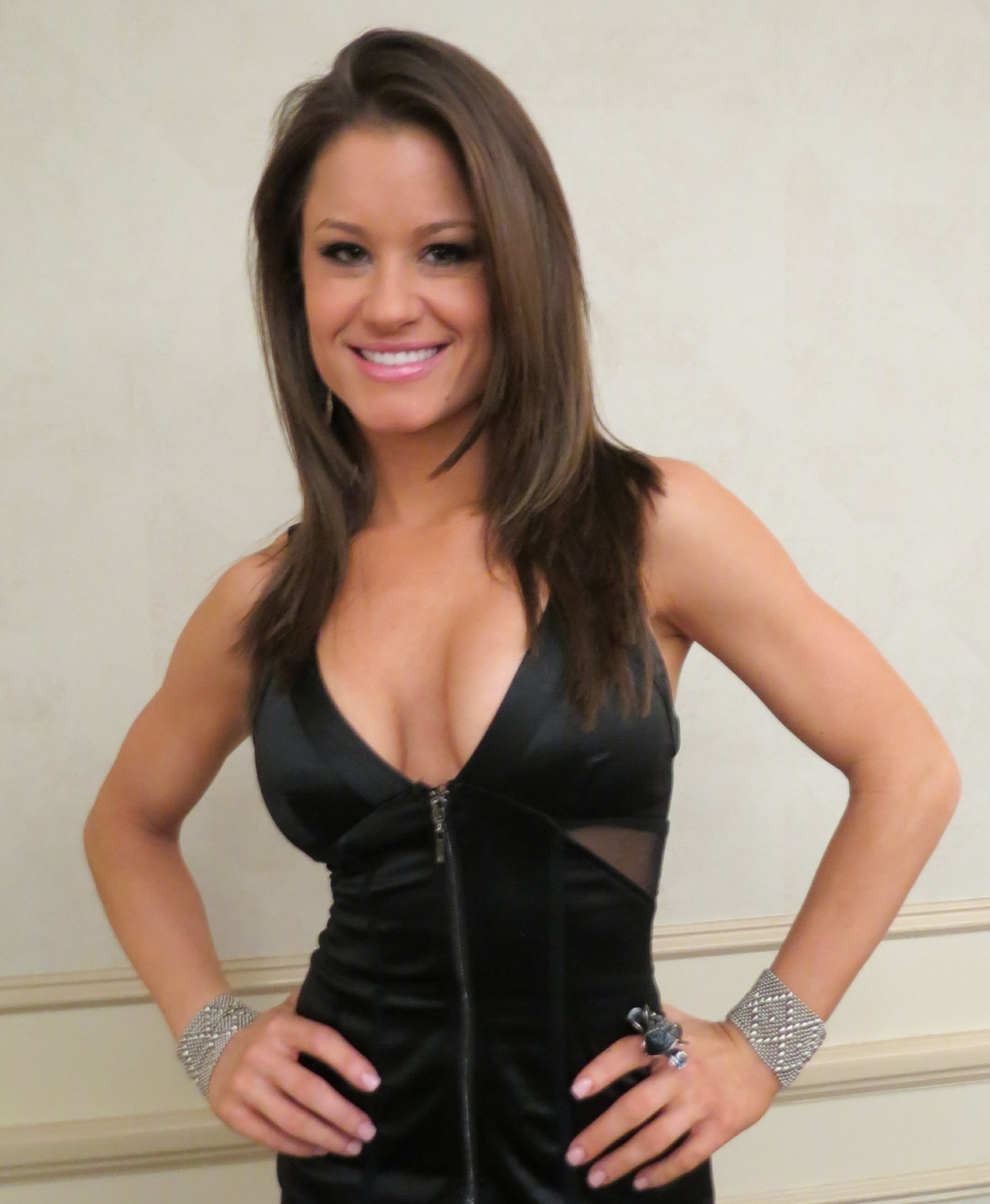
- Adams in 2012

Personal information
- Born: Brooke Nichole Adams; December 4, 1984 (age 41) St. Louis, Missouri, U.S.
- Life partners: Weston Piper (2014–present; engaged)
- Children: 2

Professional wrestling career
- Ring name(s): Brooke; Brooke Adams; Brooke Tessmacher; Miss Tessmacher
- Billed height: 5 ft 4 in (163 cm)
- Billed weight: 112 lb (51 kg)
- Billed from: Houston, Texas
- Trained by: Deep South Wrestling; Florida Championship Wrestling
- Debut: November 16, 2006
- Retired: 2017

Brooke Nichole Adams (born December 4, 1984) is an American model and retired professional wrestler, she is best known for her time in WWE and Impact Wrestling where she performed under the ring name Brooke Tessmacher.

She is best known for her time with Total Nonstop Action Wrestling (TNA), where she is a three–time TNA Knockouts Champion, and a one–time TNA Knockouts Tag Team Champion with Tara, known collectively as TnT. She previously worked for World Wrestling Entertainment (WWE) between 2006 and 2007, appearing with Kelly Kelly and Layla in the dance troupe Extreme Exposé, on the company's ECW brand.

== Early life ==
Brooke Nichole Adams was born on December 4, 1984, in St. Louis, Missouri, and moved to Houston, Texas, at the age of 7. For a time, Adams and her family lived out of her mother's Daytona hatchback until they had enough money to afford an apartment. She attended Spring High School, and was active in basketball, volleyball, track and rugby.

== Modeling career ==
Prior to becoming a wrestler, Adams competed in bikini pageants such as Miss Hawaiian Tropic, Miss Swimsuit USA and Miss Hooters. Her agent told her "You’re way too ripped to keep modeling. You need to go to the fitness side, or gain some weight and get softer and be a model."

After her release from WWE, Adams returned to fitness modeling and went on to place in the Hawaiian Tropic, Planet Beach, Darque Tan, and Bikini USA model search contests. At the 2006 Grand Prix of Houston, she won the local round for the Face of Champ Car beauty contest (with her duties later taken over by 1st Runner Up Angela Rutledge). Adams was crowned Miss Hawaiian Tropic Texas 2008 on November 8, 2008. In late 2010 she took part in the Hooters Texas Swimsuit Pageant Finals to determine seven Hooters girls who would go on to the 2010 International Hooters Swimsuit Pageant competition. In August 2011, Brooke Adams announced that she was the winner of the Hooters' Viewers' Choice $10,000 award as advertised on the Hooters Swimsuit Pageant competition.

== Professional wrestling career ==
=== World Wrestling Entertainment (2006–2007) ===
Adams first became involved in professional wrestling by trying out for the 2006 WWE Diva Search, for which she failed to make the top 8. Despite not making the cut, Adams was chosen to observe workouts in WWE's then-developmental territory Ohio Valley Wrestling (OVW), along with Maryse Ouellet, after which she was offered a developmental contract.

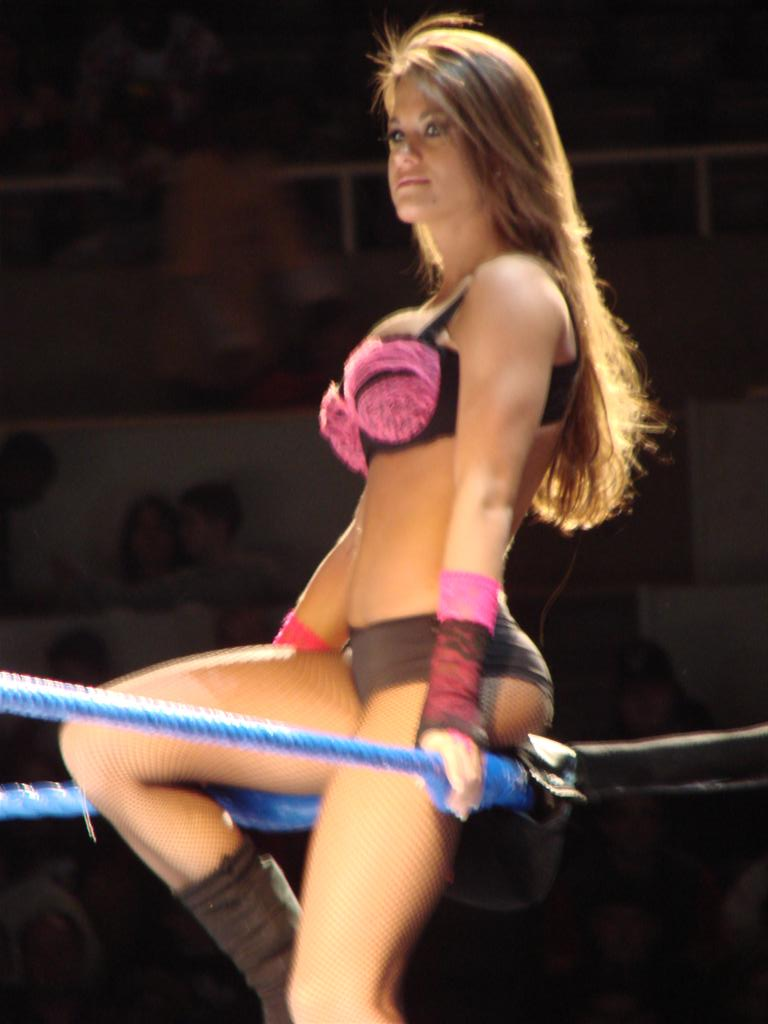
Adams in February 2007

Adams was assigned to Deep South Wrestling (DSW) to train, beginning as the valet for Daniel Rodimer. When Rodimer was called up to WWE's main roster, Adams became focused on becoming a full-time wrestler. She made her in-ring debut in a loss to Angel Williams, at a DSW TV taping in December 2006. In February 2007, she was, in storyline, promoted to the position of Personal Assistant to DSW General Manager Krissy Vaine, with her main job being to protect Vaine from Angel Williams. This eventually led to another match between Adams and Williams, as ordered by Vaine. On March 15, Adams was fired from her position, as a result of Vaine and Williams forming an alliance together.

On January 23, 2007, Adams debuted on WWE's main roster on the ECW brand, joining the returning Kelly Kelly and the newly drafted Layla in Extreme Exposé. When Florida Championship Wrestling (FCW) opened in the summer of 2007, Adams was transferred to the developmental facility for more training, as well as continuing her role on ECW. Extreme Exposé performed a weekly dance segment on ECW for the next several months, as a successor to the former Kelly's Exposé segment of a similar nature, until The Miz was placed on the ECW brand in the annual WWE Draft Lottery, at which point all three women began actively pursuing him. Later, Kelly shifted her attentions to Balls Mahoney, to the amusement of Miz and her Exposé sisters, who had been spending their time mocking his appearance, which resulted in Brooke and Layla transitioning into villainous characters. Brooke, along with the other ECW Divas, as well as the SmackDown and Raw Divas, competed in a number one contender's battle royal, where the winner would face Candice Michelle for the WWE Women's Championship at SummerSlam. However, Brooke was eliminated early first by Beth Phoenix, with Kelly Kelly as the last ECW Diva standing. Brooke's last match with WWE was a tri-brand Divas Halloween battle royal on the October 29, 2007, episode of Raw; although Brooke was eliminated early, Kelly would eliminate Torrie Wilson and Victoria to get the win for ECW. On November 1, 2007, Adams was released from her WWE contract, and Extreme Exposé dissolved as a group.

=== Total Nonstop Action Wrestling ===
==== Knockouts Division Commissioner (2010–2011) ====
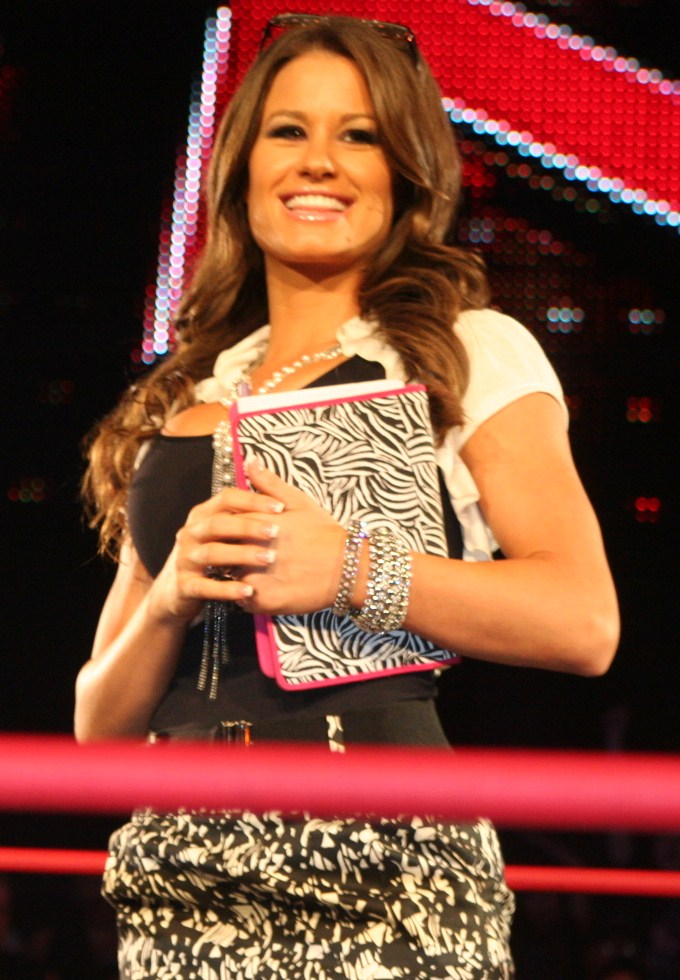
Tessmacher as Eric Bischoff's assistant July 2010

Adams made her debut for Total Nonstop Action Wrestling (TNA) on the March 29, 2010, episode of TNA Impact!, in a backstage segment portraying as Eric Bischoff's assistant, under the name Ms. Tessmacher, named after Lex Luthor's girlfriend and assistant in the first two Superman movies. On the September 30 episode of TNA Impact!, Tessmacher was put in charge of the TNA Knockouts division, as their new Knockout's Law but the position quickly went to her head, and she began being verbally abusive towards the Knockouts. On the October 14 episode of TNA Impact, Bischoff fired Tessmacher from her position as his assistant and Knockout's Law, after she had leaked information about his plans for Kevin Nash and "The Pope" D'Angelo Dinero, stating that she needed to become a wrestler herself if she was to remain in TNA. On the October 21 episode of TNA Impact!, Tessmacher begged The Beautiful People to teach her how to wrestle, but they refused, due to the treatment they received from her when she was in control of the Knockouts Division. The following week, it was announced that Lacey Von Erich, of The Beautiful People, agreed to train Tessmacher to wrestle but she left the promotion on November 11, ending the angle abruptly.

On the December 16 episode of TNA Impact!, Tessmacher made her in–ring debut as Bischoff's hand picked partner for Mickie James in the first round match of a tournament for the vacant TNA Knockouts Tag Team Championship, in which they were defeated by Madison Rayne and Tara. On December 25, Adams suffered a broken jaw in an out–of–the–ring accident and had wires and metal plates put in her jaw as a result. Tessmacher returned on the April 21, 2011, episode of TNA Impact!, stating that during her time away, she had been training to become the next TNA Women's Knockout Champion and received her first shot at the title, in her return match, two weeks later, where she was defeated by champion Mickie James. On the June 16 episode of Impact Wrestling, Tessmacher and Velvet Sky challenged Mexican America (Rosita and Sarita) for the TNA Knockouts Tag Team Championship, but were defeated after outside interference from Sky's rival, ODB.

==== Championship reigns (2011–2013) ====
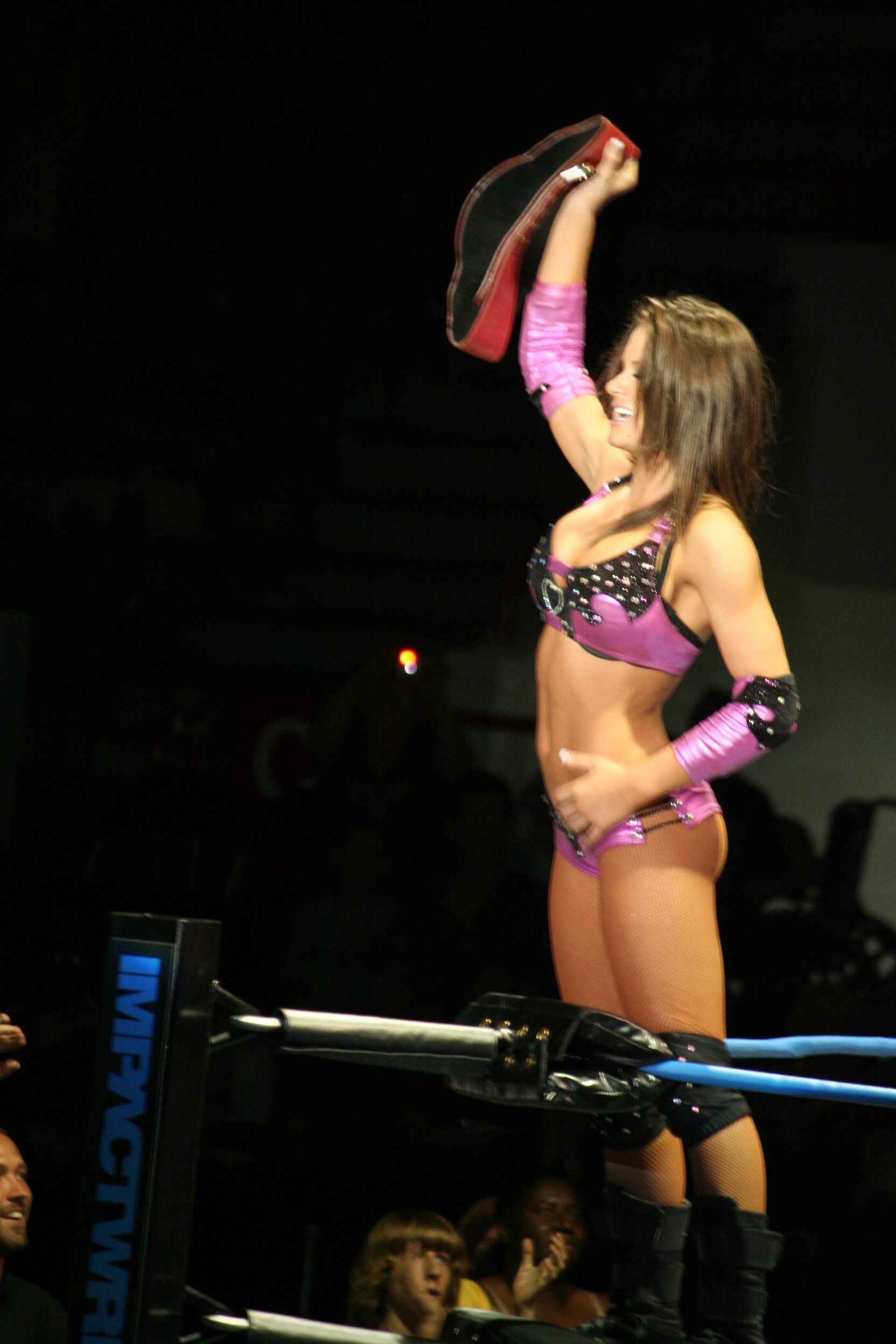
Tessmacher with the TNA Knockouts Tag Team Championship belt

On the July 21 episode of Impact Wrestling, Tessmacher and Tara, collectively known as TnT, defeated Rosita and Sarita to win the TNA Knockouts Tag Team Championship, which would be Adams' first professional wrestling championship. Tessmacher earned her first singles victory by defeating Madison Rayne on the August 4 episode of Impact Wrestling!. The following week, Adams' ring name was changed to Brooke Tessmacher. TnT went on to successfully retain the titles against Rosita and Sarita at Hardcore Justice in a rematch and against Angelina Love and Winter on October 20 before losing them to Gail Kim and Madison Rayne on the November 3 episode of Impact Wrestling. Two weeks later, both Tessmacher and Tara competed in a number one contender's gauntlet match but were both eliminated.

After pinning Gail Kim on three occasions, Tessmacher was named the number one contender for her TNA Women's Knockout Championship and receiver her title match on May 13, at the Sacrifice pay–per–view, which Kim won with her feet on the ropes. Tessmacher received another title shot on the May 17 episode of Impact Wrestling, but was again defeated by Kim in a three-way match, which also included Velvet Sky. On the June 7 episode of Impact Wrestling, a week after Brooke Hogan's debut, Adams' ring name was changed to Miss Tessmacher and she then went on to defeat Mickie James, Tara and Velvet Sky in a fatal four-way match to earn another shot at Kim's championship.

Three days later at the Slammiversary pay–per–view, Tessmacher defeated Kim to win the TNA Women's Knockout Championship for the first time. Tessmacher retained her championship against Mickie James in June and against Gail Kim in July before losing it to Madison Rayne, on August 12 at Hardcore Justice, who had referee Earl Hebner on her side, ending her reign at 63 days. Four days later, on Impact Wrestling, Tessmacher regained the title from Rayne in a match refereed by the debúting Taryn Terrell. After winning the title, Brooke was defeated by her TnT partner, Tara, in a non–title match which led to a title match between the two on September 9, at No Surrender, where Tessmacher successfully defended the title. On the September 13 episode of Impact Wrestling, Tara turned on Tessmacher and officially disbanded TnT. On October 14 at the Bound for Glory pay–per–view, Tessmacher lost the championship to Tara, ending her second reign at 59 days. Tessmacher received a rematch for the title on the October 25 episode of Impact Wrestling, but was again defeated by Tara after an interference from her boyfriend Jesse.

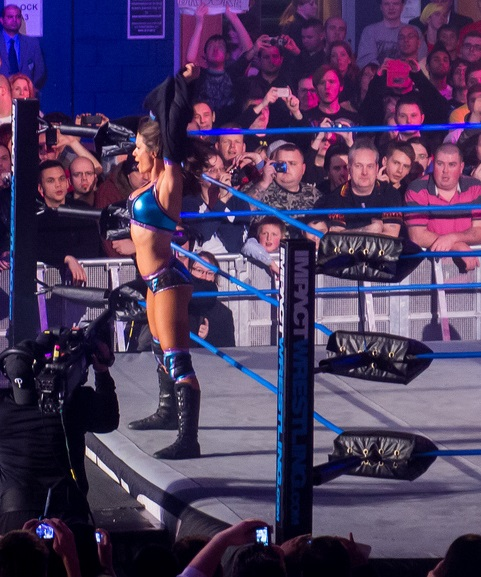
Tessmacher in early 2013

On January 13, 2013, at Genesis, Tessmacher competed in a five–woman gauntlet match to determine the number one contender to the TNA Women's Knockout Championship, but was eliminated by Gail Kim. On the February 7 episode of Impact Wrestling, Tessmacher defeated Tara in a non–title match and earned another shot at the championship which she received during a fatal four-way elimination match two weeks later, but was eliminated by Velvet Sky. In April, Brooke was defeated by Mickie James in a number one contender's match.

==== Aces & Eights (2013–2014) ====
After a four–month absence, Tessmacher returned as a heel on the August 22 episode of Impact Wrestling, revealing herself as Bully Ray’s girlfriend, joining the villainous stable. Tessmacher, now billed mononymously as Brooke, wrestled her return match on the October 3 episode of Impact Wrestling, defeating Velvet Sky in a number one contender's match for the TNA Women's Knockout Championship. On October 20, at the Bound for Glory pay–per–view, Brooke competed in a three-way match against ODB and Gail Kim for the championship, in which, Lei'D Tapa attacked both Brooke and ODB, helping Kim to win the championship. On the November 21 episode of Impact Wrestling, Brooke managed Bully Ray, who faced Mr. Anderson in a no disqualifications match, which Anderson won, and as a pre–stipulation of the match, were forced to disband. On the December 26 episode of Impact Wrestling, in a backstage segment, Bully Ray ended his relationship with Brooke.

On May 10, 2014, after a six–month hiatus, Brooke returned at the tapings for the Knockouts Knockdown 2 pay–per–view (which aired on tape delay on November 7, 2014), defeating Deonna, while still working as a heel, but was eliminated from the gauntlet match later that night. Brooke made her televised return on the June 12 episode of Impact Wrestling, as a fan favorite, in an in–ring segment with Ethan Carter III and Rockstar Spud, where the two would attempt to get her to reveal Bully Ray's secrets, but she refused. Ray would come out and hug Brooke afterwards. Brooke was then sidelined with a torn ACL and after fully recovering, she took more time off to participate in The Amazing Race alongside Robbie E.

==== Final feuds and departure (2015) ====
On January 7, 2015, during Impact Wrestling's debút on Destination America, Brooke returned to TNA and attacked her former boyfriend Robbie E, who insulted her upon his return. On the January 16 episode of Impact Wrestling, in her in–ring return, Brooke and Taryn Terrell lost to The Beautiful People (Angelina Love and Velvet Sky) in a tag team match, after Robbie caused a distraction. The feud between Brooke and Robbie continued throughout February and officially ended on the March 13 episode of Impact Wrestling, when Brooke defeated Robbie in an intergender match dubbed as the "Battle of the Exes", despite interference from Angelina Love and Jessie Godderz.

On the TKO: Night of Knockouts edition of Impact Wrestling on April 24, Brooke became the number one contender to Taryn Terrell's TNA Women's Knockout Championship after defeating Angelina Love, Gail Kim and Madison Rayne in a fatal four-way match. Brooke then unsuccessfully challenged Terrell for the championship on the Hardcore Justice edition of Impact Wrestling on May 1 and, on July 1, in a three-way match, which also involved Awesome Kong. In June, Brooke and Kong formed an alliance to compete against Terrell and The Dollhouse (Jade and Marti Bell), defeating them in a tag team and three–on–two handicap match at Slammiversary XIII. On June 25, during the tapings of Impact Wrestling, which aired on July 15, Brooke defeated Terrell and won the TNA Women's Knockout Championship for a third time, after interference from the returning Gail Kim. In her first title defence, Brooke retained the championship against Marti Bell, two weeks later. Brooke was scheduled to face Velvet Sky in a title match on the August 26 episode of Impact Wrestling, but the match, however, ended in a no–contest after interference from Jade and Marti Bell. In September, Brooke once again retained her title, this time via disqualification, after Lei'D Tapa interfered in her match against Kim and attacked Brooke. However, on the September 16 episode of Impact Wrestling, Brooke lost the championship to Kim in a fatal four-way match, which also involved Tapa and Awesome Kong. During October and November (taped in July), Brooke participated in the TNA World Title Series as part of Group Knockouts, along with Madison Rayne, Gail Kim and Awesome Kong; she scored 3 points and tied with Rayne, thus failing to advance to the finals.

On November 15, Adams announced her departure from the promotion, later revealed to be due to her pregnancy, which she did not publicly disclose until February 2016.

=== Family Wrestling Entertainment (2012) ===
On February 25, 2012, Tessmacher made her debut for Family Wrestling Entertainment (FWE), losing to fellow TNA Knockout Winter in the first round to determine the inaugural FWE Women's Champion. Later that night, Tessmacher and TnT partner Tara helped Maria defeat Winter in the finals of the tournament, making this her last independent circuit appearance.

=== Return to TNA / Impact Wrestling (2017) ===
On January 7, 2017, during the tapings of the January 19 episode of Impact Wrestling, Brooke returned to TNA, defeating Deonna Purrazzo and after the match, was attacked by Sienna, which led to a match between the two, where Sienna defeated Brooke after interference from Maria. This led to a rematch between the two, on the February 16 episode of Impact Wrestling, where Brooke scored a victory over Sienna. In a live Facebook video chat on June 8, 2017, Brooke announced that she was no longer under contract with Impact Wrestling.

== Other media ==
In April 2007, Adams, along with Ashley, Kelly Kelly, Layla El, Torrie Wilson, and Maryse, appeared in Timbaland's music video "Throw It On Me" featuring The Hives, which premiered on Raw on May 20, 2007. In August 2007, Adams, along with Extreme Exposé, appeared on FHMOnline.com. In June 2011, Adams was featured in a music video for Dorrough titled "Bounce Dat". On November 10, 2012, Brooke Adams, along with several other TNA workers, was featured in an episode of MTV's Made.

In 2014, Adams and fellow TNA wrestler Robert Strauss, better known as Robbie E, participated in the 25th season of The Amazing Race. They survived until the middle part of the final leg of the race, where they were the eighth team to be eliminated and placed fourth. In 2017, Brooke appeared on the TLC show Rattled, which chronicled the birth of her son Jace.

== Personal life ==
Adams has a fraternal twin sister, Brittaney Adams, who is eight minutes younger than Brooke.

Adams is engaged to model and personal trainer Weston Wayne Piper. Their first child, a boy named Jace, was born on September 3, 2016. She gave birth to a baby girl, whom she named Phoenix Presley-Lee, on October 31, 2018.

== Championships and accomplishments ==
- Pro Wrestling Illustrated
  - Ranked No. 7 of the top 50 female wrestlers in the PWI Female 50 in 2012
- Total Nonstop Action Wrestling
  - TNA Knockouts Championship (3 times)
  - TNA Knockouts Tag Team Championship (1 time) – with Tara
- Wrestling Observer Newsletter
  - Worst Gimmick (2013) Aces & Eights
