= Victory Road (2012) =

2012 Total Nonstop Action Wrestling pay-per-view event

- Promotional poster featuring Sting
- Promotion: Total Nonstop Action Wrestling (TNA)
- Date: March 18, 2012
- City: Orlando, Florida
- Venue: Impact Zone
- Attendance: 1,100
- Tagline: Half Crazy

Pay-per-view chronology
← Previous; Against All Odds	Next → Lockdown

Victory Road chronology
← Previous; 2011	Next → 2017

The 2012 Victory Road was a professional wrestling pay-per-view (PPV) event produced by the Total Nonstop Action Wrestling (TNA) promotion, which took place on March 18, 2012, at the Impact Wrestling Zone in Orlando, Florida. It was the eighth and final PPV under the Victory Road chronology and the third event in the 2012 TNA PPV schedule.

In October 2017, with the launch of the Global Wrestling Network, the event became available to stream on demand.

== Storylines ==
Other on-screen personnel
Commentator	Mike Tenay
Commentator	Jeremy Borash
Ring announcer	Christy Hemme
Referee	Rudy Charles
Referee	Mark "Slick" Johnson
Referee	Andrew Thomas
Interviewers	Jeremy Borash

Victory Road featured eight professional wrestling matches that involved different wrestlers from pre-existing scripted feuds and storylines. Wrestlers portrayed villains, heroes, or less distinguishable characters in the scripted events that built tension and culminated in a wrestling match or series of matches.

The primary feud entering Victory Road entailed TNA World Heavyweight Champion Bobby Roode and TNA General Manager Sting, who competed in a non-title No Holds Barred match. Ever since November when Roode transformed into a selfish and villainous persona in the company, Sting had his hands full dealing with Roode's low and rebellious actions which included avoiding championship defenses and potential losses by bending and manipulating the rules. At Against All Odds, after the referee was rendered incapable, Sting as the special ringside enforcer, reluctantly authorized the fall that allowed Roode to retain his championship from four other contenders that night. On the following week's Impact Wrestling, Roode attacked Sting for announcing the Lockdown main event that would see Roode face Storm (who won a number one contender's match during the night) in a Cage match for the title. Roode tried to force Sting into retirement from the company the next week when speculation circulated that Sting was "done" with wrestling, however, Sting refused, changing into his crazed alter-ego personality and challenged Roode to a match at Victory Road.

A feud developed that led to James Storm facing Bully Ray over number one contention to the TNA World Heavyweight Championship at Victory Road. On the February 16 edition of Impact, Storm beat Ray to become the number one contender to the TNA World Heavyweight Championship at Lockdown. Following the match, Ray attacked Storm and unceremoniously confronted football running back of the New York Giants in the building that night, Brandon Jacobs, prompting retaliation. Jacobs and Storm became allies, and on the next week's Impact, Jacobs helped Storm and Hardy to defeat Ray and Kurt Angle during the featured No Disqualification main event match after sending Ray through a table with a chokeslam. In the subsequent weeks that Storm and Ray extended their feud, Ray requested TNA GM, Sting, to name him number one contender to the World Championship for beating down Storm with a chair after a match involving two of them. Initially turned down, it was later announced that Ray would face Storm for his number one contender's spot at Victory Road.

Another main feud on the card was between Jeff Hardy and Kurt Angle. On the February 16 edition of Impact, Kurt Angle interfered in Jeff Hardy's World Championship match with defending champion Bobby Roode, which led to a loss for Hardy.Two weeks later, Angle explained that the reasoning behind the attack was because of envy of Hardy's popularity, despite his enigmatic appearance, and for his influence on his son. Angle challenged Hardy to a match at Victory Road with Hardy accepting the match through a physical confrontation.

The feud continued brewing as Mr. Anderson joined A.J Styles to take on his enemies, Kazarian and Christopher Daniels. Because of the interference by Kazarian, AJ Styles won a TNA Television Championship match by disqualification over Robbie E, who retained the title due to such result that does not allow titles to change hands. In a 2-on-1 Gauntlet match against Daniels and Kazarian the next week, Styles eliminated Daniels by way of disqualification after receiving the Fade to Black from Kazarian, who then pinned Styles to win the match. During the next week, Daniels blamed his betrayal on his former alliance with Styles claiming that it brought Styles fortune and fame while he was fired, and because of this, advised Kazarian not to make the same mistake. Styles, sick of their attitudes, announced the return of his new ally, Mr. Anderson.

The X Division match set up for the event was between defending champion Austin Aries and Zema Ion, competing over the TNA X Division Championship. Over several weeks, Ion competed with other X Division wrestlers and gained victories over his counterparts. On the March 8 edition of Impact, Ion defeated Aries by disqualification in a match for the X Division Championship, but due to the result, the title did not switch hands. A rematch was later added to the PPV line-up.

The Knockouts match heading into the event was between the defending champion Gail Kim and Madison Rayne, fighting over the TNA Women's Knockout Championship. At Against All Odds, Rayne, who accompanied Kim to her matches for months, walked out on her. Kim tried to bury any issues between her and Rayne as she appreciated Rayne being there as a friend. However, Rayne went on to manipulate her way into winning a Knockouts Battle Royal to become the number one contender to the Knockouts Title, surprising Kim that her friend would betray her. Further problems arose the next week when they would lose the TNA Knockouts Tag Team Championship to Eric Young and ODB.

The Tag Team feud continuing into the event was defending champions Samoa Joe and Magnus taking on former champions Matt Morgan and Crimson. At Against All Odds, Joe and Magnus defeated Morgan and Crimson for the tag titles. After the two teams built their momentum gaining wins for a few weeks, the rematch was later scheduled.

Robbie E put out an Open Challenge for the TNA Television Championship, which later went answered by Devon at the PPV.

== Results ==
No.	Results	Stipulations	Times
1	James Storm defeated Bully Ray	Singles match for Storm‘s #1 contendership to TNA World Heavyweight Championship at Lockdown	01:10
2	Austin Aries (c) defeated Zema Ion	Singles match for the TNA X Division Championship	11:08
3	Magnus and Samoa Joe (c) defeated Crimson and Matt Morgan	Tag team match for the TNA World Tag Team Championship	10:12
4	Devon defeated Robbie E (c) (with Robbie T)	Singles match for the TNA Television Championship	03:00
5	Gail Kim (c) defeated Madison Rayne	Singles match for the TNA Knockouts Championship	07:09
6	A.J. Styles and Mr. Anderson defeated Christopher Daniels and Kazarian	Tag team match	13:59
7	Kurt Angle defeated Jeff Hardy	Singles match	19:07
8	Bobby Roode defeated Sting	No Holds Barred match	16:40
(c) / – the champion(s) heading into the match

== See also ==
- 2012 in professional wrestling
