= TNA Lockdown (2012) =

2012 Total Nonstop Action Wrestling pay-per-view event

Lockdown (2012)
- Promotional poster featuring Bobby Roode and James Storm
- Promotion: Total Nonstop Action Wrestling
- Date: April 15, 2012
- City: Nashville, Tennessee
- Venue: Nashville Municipal Auditorium
- Attendance: 3,000

Pay-per-view chronology
← Previous; Victory Road	Next → Sacrifice

Lockdown chronology
← Previous; 2011	Next → 2013

The 2012 Lockdown was a professional wrestling pay-per-view (PPV) event produced by the Total Nonstop Action Wrestling (TNA) promotion, which took place on April 15, 2012 at the Nashville Municipal Auditorium in Nashville, Tennessee. It was the eighth under the Lockdown chronology and fourth event in the 2012 TNA PPV schedule. In the concept of Lockdown events, every match took place inside a Steel Cage.

In October 2017, with the launch of the Global Wrestling Network, the event became available to stream on demand.

== Storylines ==
Other on-screen personnel
Commentator	Mike Tenay
Commentator	Taz
Ring announcer	Jeremy Borash
Referee	Earl Hebner
Referee	Brian Hebner
Referee	Brian Stiffler
Interviewers	Jeremy Borash

Lockdown featured eight professional wrestling matches that involved different wrestlers from pre-existing scripted feuds and storylines. Wrestlers portrayed villains, heroes, or less distinguishable characters in the scripted events that built tension and culminated in a wrestling match or series of matches.

The primary rivalry was between TNA World Heavyweight Champion Bobby Roode and James Storm. Formerly allies as part of Beer Money, Inc. and Fortune, the 2011 Bound for Glory Series saw them competing as singles for an opportunity to compete for the World Heavyweight Championship at Bound for Glory. Roode won the 12-man tournament, and earned a match with the champion, Kurt Angle, but lost after Angle cheated using the ropes, out of the view of the referee. It was then revealed that Roode was prevented from receiving a rematch. Roode's partner Storm won a shot, and defeated Angle to become champion, after which Roode challenged Storm as part of his first defense. On the November 3 episode of Impact Wrestling, Roode turned villainous by hitting Storm over the head with a beer bottle to capture the title. Roode would proceed to act rebelliously against Sting, the current General manager of Impact Wrestling, over the next few months, whilst Storm would feud with Angle and Bully Ray on the undercard. On the February 16, 2012 episode of Impact Wrestling, Storm defeated Bully Ray to become the number one contender to face Roode for the TNA World Heavyweight Championship in a Cage match at Lockdown, in Storm's home state of Nashville, Tennessee.

Another main feud was between Eric Bischoff and his son Garett. Eric had been one of the leaders of the Immortal stable, whilst Garett had worked as a referee under the assumed name "Jackson James". At Bound for Glory, Immortal's Hulk Hogan faced and was defeated by Sting, to oust Immortal from power, with Garett assigned as referee. After the match, Eric turned on Garett for counting the winning fall. In December, Garett was attacked by Immortal's Gunner and received a storyline injury from a piledriver on concrete floor. On the January 5 episode of Impact Wrestling, Garett returned to the company not as a referee, but a full-time wrestler, at the hands of new general manager Sting. Eric attempted to deter him from the business, saying he had no friends, but Garett revealed he had been trained by Hogan. At Against All Odds, Garett lost to Gunner, with Hogan and Bischoff in their respective corners. Weeks later, Eric offered Garett a chance to live his life peacefully if he could survive facing Gunner in a cage match at Lockdown. On the April 5 episode of Impact Wrestling, Hulk Hogan resumed his general manager role and turned this match into a 5-on-5 Lethal Lockdown match with a team of Garett's choice (Garett, A.J Styles, Austin Aries, Mr. Anderson, and Rob Van Dam), (Eric, Gunner, Bully Ray, Christopher Daniels, and Kazarian). On the April 12 episode of Impact Wrestling, Team Garett gained the man advantage in the Lethal Lockdown match. TNA General Manager Hulk Hogan added 2 stipulations for the match if Team Eric lost Eric Bischoff must leave TNA & he is not allowed to use his own name. If Team Garrett lose Garrett Bischoff must Leave TNA.

The feud between Jeff Hardy and Kurt Angle upheld as it moved into Lockdown. The feud had stemmed after Angle cost Hardy his shot at the TNA World Heavyweight Championship in February. Angle pinpointed his disapproval of the influence Hardy had on his son and his own disliking for Hardy in general as his motive. At Victory Road, on March 18 the next month, Angle defeated Hardy utilizing the ropes as an aid to successfully pin Hardy similarly to his actions at Bound for Glory against Bobby Roode. Because of this, Hardy called him out as a cheater and challenged Angle to a Cage match at Lockdown. The next week, Angle sneakily cost Hardy a match against Mr. Anderson, and a week after that, wrestled Hardy to a count-out which gave Hardy the victory when Angle decided to walk out on the match. That night, TNA General Manager Hulk Hogan accosted Angle, informing him that he could no longer run or hide and that his match with Hardy was officially scheduled for Lockdown.

A feud formed among two former tag team partners, Matt Morgan and Crimson. At Against All Odds, Morgan and Crimson lost the TNA World Tag Team Championship to Samoa Joe and Magnus. At Victory Road, on March 18, Crimson abandoned the match with Morgan for the tag titles due to communication issues and laid Morgan out with a spear, proclaiming aloud that he's an undefeated singles winner and Morgan was a loser. On the following Impact Wrestling, Crimson, who was shown watching Morgan featured in a Direct Auto Insurance commercial backstage, accused Morgan for being focused on other endeavors and letting the team down, going on to challenge him to a match for the next week, but Morgan moved in for the attack which led to security breaking it up. Morgan fought Crimson in a match the next week that resulted in a double count-out when they took their brawl out of the ring and outside the Impact Zone.

The Knockouts match heading into Lockdown was between defending champion Gail Kim against Velvet Sky for the TNA Women's Knockout Championship. After Velvet Sky became victorious with a win over Kim's latest contender Madison Rayne, Sky put the company on notice of her rematch clause as a former Knockout Champion and the fact that she didn't receive her rematch against Kim since losing the title at the Turning Point PPV on November 13. In a number one contender's match the next week, Sky defeated Mickie James, Tara, Madison Rayne, Angelina Love, and Winter to earn her shot at the Knockout Title.

The tag team match heading into Lockdown was The Motor City Machine Guns challenging defending champions, Samoa Joe and Magnus for the TNA World Tag Team Championship. On the April 5 episode of Impact Wrestling, the Machine Guns returned to action following injuries which had them sidelined, and defeated Mexican America. After the match, they declared they were after the tag titles.

A feud began between Devon and Robbie E over the TNA Television Championship. At Victory Road, on March 18, Devon answered Robbie E's Open Challenge and beat him for the Television Championship. Therefore, Robbie E got his rematch at Lockdown.

Added to the event as a fill in between the two main events during the show was Eric Young and ODB defending the TNA Knockout Tag Team Championship against Sarita and Rosita.

== Results ==
No.	Results	Stipulations	Times
1	Team Garett (A.J. Styles, Austin Aries, Garett Bischoff, Mr. Anderson and Rob Van Dam) defeated Team Eric (Bully Ray, Christopher Daniels, Eric Bischoff, Gunner and Kazarian)	Lethal Lockdown match Since Team Garett won, Eric had to leave TNA and renounce his name. Had Team Eric won, Garett would have had to leave TNA.	26:10
2	Magnus and Samoa Joe (c) defeated The Motor City Machine Guns (Alex Shelley and Chris Sabin)	Steel Cage match for the TNA World Tag Team Championship	11:20
3	Devon (c) defeated Robbie E (with Robbie T)	Steel Cage match for the TNA Television Championship	03:25
4	Gail Kim (c) defeated Velvet Sky	Steel Cage match for the TNA Women's Knockout Championship	07:30
5	Crimson defeated Matt Morgan	Steel Cage match	08:00
6	Jeff Hardy defeated Kurt Angle	Steel Cage match	14:52
7	Eric Young and ODB (c) defeated Mexican America (Rosita and Sarita)	Steel Cage match for the TNA Knockouts Tag Team Championship	04:17
8	Bobby Roode (c) defeated James Storm	Steel Cage match for the TNA World Heavyweight Championship	20:09
(c) / – the champion(s) heading into the match

== See also ==
- 2012 in professional wrestling
