= 2015 in professional wrestling =

2015 in professional wrestling describes the year's events in the world of professional wrestling.

== List of notable promotions ==
These promotions held notable events in 2015.

Promotion Name	Abbreviation	Notes
Consejo Mundial de Lucha Libre	CMLL	
Global Force Wrestling	GFW	
Lucha Libre AAA Worldwide	AAA	The "AAA" abbreviation has been used since the mid-1990s and had previously stood for the promotion's original name Asistencia Asesoría y Administración.
New Japan Pro-Wrestling	NJPW	
Pro Wrestling Guerrilla	PWG	
Revolution Pro Wrestling	RevPro	
Ring of Honor	ROH	
Total Nonstop Action Wrestling	TNA	
World Wrestling Council	WWC	
WWE	—	WWE stands for World Wrestling Entertainment, which is still the legal name, but the company ceased using the full name in April 2011, with the WWE abbreviation becoming an orphaned initialism. NXT served as WWE's developmental territory.

== Calendar of notable shows ==
=== January ===
Date	Promotion(s)	Event	Location	Main event
3	WWC	Euphoria	Bayamon, Puerto Rico	Carlito (c) defeated The Mighty Ursus in an Inferno match for the WWC Universal Championship
4	NJPW	Wrestle Kingdom 9	Tokyo	Hiroshi Tanahashi (c) defeated Kazuchika Okada in a Singles match to retain the IWGP Heavyweight Championship
25	WWE	Royal Rumble	Philadelphia	Roman Reigns won the 30-man Royal Rumble match by last eliminating Rusev to earn a WWE World Heavyweight Championship match at WrestleMania 31
(c) – denotes defending champion(s)

=== February ===
Date	Promotion(s)	Event	Location	Main event
11	WWE: NXT	TakeOver: Rival	Winter Park	Kevin Owens defeated Sami Zayn (c) by referee stoppage to win the NXT Championship
11	NJPW	The New Beginning in Osaka	Osaka	A.J. Styles defeated Hiroshi Tanahashi (c) in a Singles match to win the IWGP Heavyweight Championship
13	TNA	One Night Only: Hardcore Justice	Orlando, Florida	Bobby Roode defeated Lashley in a Last Man standing match
13	TNA	One Night Only: Global Impact – USA vs. The World	Orlando, Florida	Team International's The Great Muta defeated Team USA's Mr. Anderson
14	NJPW	The New Beginning in Sendai	Sendai	Shinsuke Nakamura (c) defeated Yuji Nagata in a Singles match to retain the IWGP Intercontinental Championship
14	TNA	One Night Only: Joker's Wild	Orlando, Florida	16-person intergender Joker's Wild gauntlet battle royal
15	TNA	One Night Only: X-Travaganza	Orlando, Florida	Ultimate X match
15	TNA	One Night Only: Knockouts Knockdown	Orlando, Florida	Knockouts Gauntlet match to crown the "Queen of the Knockouts"
15	TNA	One Night Only: World Cup	Orlando, Florida	Six-on-Six Elimination Tag Team match
16	TNA	One Night Only: Gut Check	Orlando, Florida	Five-way elimination match
16	TNA	One Night Only: The TNA Classic	Orlando, Florida	Gunner defeated Bram
22	WWE	Fastlane	Memphis	Roman Reigns defeated Daniel Bryan in a Singles match to retain his spot as the #1 contender for the WWE World Heavyweight Championship at WrestleMania 31
(c) – denotes defending champion(s)

=== March ===
Date	Promotion(s)	Event	Location	Main event
1	ROH	ROH 13th Anniversary Show	Las Vegas	Jay Briscoe (c) defeated Tommaso Ciampa, Michael Elgin and Hanson in a Four corner survival match to retain the ROH World Championship
15	NJPW	New Japan Cup Final	Hiroshima	Kota Ibushi defeated Hirooki Goto in the tournament final to win the 2015 New Japan Cup
18	AAA	Rey de Reyes	Zapopan, Jalisco, Mexico	Four-way elimination Rey de Reyes tournament final match
27	ROH	Supercard of Honor IX	Redwood City	Jay Briscoe (c) defeated Samoa Joe in a Singles match to retain the ROH World Championship
29	WWE	WrestleMania 31	Santa Clara	Seth Rollins cashed in his Money in the Bank contract during Roman Reigns and Brock Lesnar's (c) singles match to make it a triple threat match and pinned Reigns to win the WWE World Heavyweight Championship.
(c) – denotes defending champion(s)

=== April ===
Date	Promotion(s)	Event	Location	Main event
5	NJPW	Invasion Attack	Tokyo	A.J. Styles (c) defeated Kota Ibushi in a Singles match to retain the IWGP Heavyweight Championship
26	CMLL	59. Aniversario de Arena México	Mexico City, Mexico	Marco Corleone defeated La Sombra, Pólvora, Barbaro Cavernario, Dragon Lee, Kamaitachi, La Máscara, Ripper, Morphosis and Titán
26	WWE	Extreme Rules	Rosemont	Seth Rollins (c) defeated Randy Orton in a Steel Cage match to retain WWE World Heavyweight Championship with the RKO banned and Kane as the gatekeeper
(c) – denotes defending champion(s)

=== May ===
Date	Promotion(s)	Event	Location	Main event
3	NJPW	Wrestling Dontaku	Fukuoka	Hirooki Goto defeated Shinsuke Nakamura (c) in a Singles match to win the IWGP Intercontinental Championship
12	ROH; NJPW	War of the Worlds	Philadelphia	Chaos (Kazuchika Okada and Shinsuke Nakamura) defeated The Briscoes (Jay Briscoe and Mark Briscoe) in a Tag Team match
13	ROH; NJPW	War of the Worlds	Philadelphia	The Kingdom (Adam Cole, Matt Taven and Michael Bennett) defeated Bullet Club (A.J. Styles, Matt Jackson and Nick Jackson) in a Six-man tag team match
15	ROH; NJPW	Global Wars	Toronto	ROH All Stars (Hanson, Jay Briscoe, Mark Briscoe, Ray Rowe and Roderick Strong) defeated Bullet Club (A.J. Styles, Doc Gallows, Karl Anderson, Matt Jackson and Nick Jackson) in a Ten-man tag team match
16	ROH; NJPW	Global Wars	Toronto	Bullet Club (A.J. Styles, Matt Jackson and Nick Jackson) defeated Chaos (Beretta, Kazuchika Okada and Rocky Romero) in a Six-man tag team match
17	WWE	Payback	Baltimore	Seth Rollins (c) defeated Roman Reigns, Dean Ambrose, and Randy Orton in a Fatal 4-Way match to retain the WWE World Heavyweight Championship. Had Rollins lost the title, Kane would have been fired as the Director of Operations.
20	WWE: NXT	TakeOver: Unstoppable	Winter Park	Kevin Owens (c) vs Sami Zayn in a Singles match for the NXT Championship ended in a no contest
31	WWE	Elimination Chamber	Corpus Christi	Dean Ambrose defeated Seth Rollins (c) by disqualification in a Singles match for the WWE World Heavyweight Championship
(c) – denotes defending champion(s)

=== June ===
Date	Promotion(s)	Event	Location	Main event
7	NJPW	Best of the Super Juniors	Tokyo	Kushida defeated Kyle O'Reilly in final match in Best Of The Super Junior 2015.
14	AAA	Verano de Escándalo	Monterrey, Nuevo León, Mexico	Myzteziz, La Parka and Rey Mysterio Jr. defeated Johnny Mundo, El Mesias and Pentagón Jr. in a Six-man tag team match
14	WWE	Money in the Bank	Columbus	Seth Rollins (c) defeated Dean Ambrose in a Ladder match to retain the WWE World Heavyweight Championship
19	ROH	Best in the World	New York City	Jay Lethal (c - TV) defeated Jay Briscoe (c - World) in a Winner Take All singles match to win both the ROH World Championship and ROH World Television Championship
28	TNA	Slammiversary	Orlando	Jeff Jarrett defeated Matt Hardy, Eric Young, Drew Galloway, and Bobby Roode in a King of the Mountain match to win the vacant TNA King of the Mountain Championship
(c) – denotes defending champion(s)

=== July ===
Date	Promotion(s)	Event	Location	Main event
4	WWE	The Beast in the East	Sumida	John Cena and Dolph Ziggler defeated Kane and King Barrett in a Tag Team match
5	NJPW	Dominion	Osaka	Kazuchika Okada defeated A.J. Styles (c) in a Singles match to win the IWGP Heavyweight Championship
17	CMLL	Sin Salida	Mexico City, Mexico	Último Guerrero defeated Rey Escorpión in a Best two-out-of-three falls Lucha de Apuestas hair vs. hair match
19	WWE	Battleground	St. Louis	Brock Lesnar defeated Seth Rollins (c) by disqualification in a Singles match for the WWE World Heavyweight Championship
24	GFW	One Night Only: GFW Amped Anthology – Part 1	Las Vegas, Nevada	GFW Global Championship Tournament match
24	ROH	Death Before Dishonor	Baltimore	Jay Lethal (c) vs. Roderick Strong ended in a 60-minute time limit draw in a Singles match for the ROH World Championship
25	GFW	One Night Only: GFW Amped Anthology – Part 2	Las Vegas, Nevada	GFW Global Championship Tournament match
(c) – denotes defending champion(s)

=== August ===
Date	Promotion(s)	Event	Location	Main event
9	AAA	Triplemanía XXIII	Mexico City	Rey Mysterio Jr. defeated Myzteziz
16	NJPW	G1 Climax Final	Tokyo	Hiroshi Tanahashi defeated Shinsuke Nakamura in the final of the 2015 G1 Climax
21	GFW	One Night Only: GFW Amped Anthology – Part 3	Las Vegas, Nevada	GFW Global Championship #1 Contenders Triple Threat match
21	GFW	One Night Only: GFW Amped Anthology – Part 4	Las Vegas, Nevada	GFW Global Championship Finals match
22	ROH	Field of Honor	Brooklyn	Jay Lethal and Shinsuke Nakamura defeated reDRagon (Bobby Fish and Kyle O'Reilly) in a Tag Team match
22	WWE: NXT	TakeOver: Brooklyn	Brooklyn	Finn Bálor (c) defeated Kevin Owens in a Ladder match to retain the NXT Championship
23	WWE	SummerSlam	Brooklyn	The Undertaker defeated Brock Lesnar by submission in a Singles match
28–30	PWG	Battle of Los Angeles	Reseda, California	Zack Sabre Jr. defeated Chris Hero and Mike Bailey in an elimination three-way match to win the 2015 Battle of Los Angeles tournament
(c) – denotes defending champion(s)

=== September ===
Date	Promotion(s)	Event	Location	Main event
18	CMLL	CMLL 82nd Anniversary Show	Mexico City, Mexico	Atlantis defeated La Sombra in a Best two-out-of-three falls Lucha de Apuestas, mask vs. mask match
18	ROH	All Star Extravaganza	San Antonio	Jay Lethal (c) defeated Kyle O'Reilly in a Singles match to retain the ROH World Championship
20	WWE	Night of Champions	Houston	Seth Rollins (c) defeated Sting in a Singles match to retain the WWE World Heavyweight Championship
23	NJPW	Destruction in Okayama	Okayama	Togi Makabe (c) defeated Kota Ibushi in a Singles match to retain the NEVER Openweight Championship
26	WWC	42nd WWC Aniversario	Bayamón, Puerto Rico	Tommy Diablo vs. Peter the Bad Romance (c) for the WWC Junior Heavyweight Championship
27	NJPW	Destruction in Kobe	Kobe	Shinsuke Nakamura defeated Hirooki Goto (c) in a Singles match to win the IWGP Intercontinental Championship
(c) – denotes defending champion(s)

=== October ===
Date	Promotion(s)	Event	Location	Main event
2	NJPW / RevPro	Uprising	Bethnal Green, London, United Kingdom	AJ Styles (c) defeated Marty Scurll and Will Ospreay in a Three-way match for the British Heavyweight Championship
3	NJPW / RevPro	Global Wars UK	Reading, United Kingdom	AJ Styles (c) defeated Jyushin Thunder Liger in a Singles match for the British Heavyweight Championship
3	WWE	Live from Madison Square Garden	New York City	John Cena (c) defeated Seth Rollins in a Steel Cage match to retain the WWE United States Championship
4	AAA	Heroes Inmortales	San Luis Potosí, San Luis Potosí, Mexico	El Patrón Alberto (c) defeated Johnny Mundo in a Singles match for the AAA Mega Championship
4	TNA	Bound for Glory	Concord	Matt Hardy defeated Ethan Carter III (c) and Drew Galloway in a Three-Way match to win the TNA World Heavyweight Championship with Jeff Hardy as special guest referee
7	WWE: NXT	TakeOver: Respect	Winter Park	Bayley (c) defeated Sasha Banks 3–2 in a 30-minute Iron Man match to retain the NXT Women's Championship
12	NJPW	King of Pro-Wrestling	Tokyo	Kazuchika Okada (c) defeated A.J. Styles in a Singles match to retain the IWGP Heavyweight Championship
23	GFW	GFW Amped Anthology – Part 3	Las Vegas, Nevada	GFW Global Championship Finals match
23	ROH	Glory By Honor	Kalamazoo	The Kingdom (Adam Cole, Matt Taven and Michael Bennett) defeated Dalton Castle and War Machine (Hanson and Raymond Rowe) in a Six-man tag team match
24	ROH	Glory By Honor	Dayton	ROH Champions (Jay Lethal, Roderick Strong and The Kingdom (Matt Taven and Michael Bennett)) defeated ROH All-Stars (Moose, The Addiction (Christopher Daniels and Frankie Kazarian) and Dalton Castle) in an Eight-man elimination tag team match
25	WWE	Hell in a Cell	Los Angeles	Brock Lesnar defeated The Undertaker in a Hell in a Cell match
(c) – denotes defending champion(s)

=== November ===
Date	Promotion(s)	Event	Location	Main event
7	NJPW	Power Struggle	Osaka	Shinsuke Nakamura (c) defeated Karl Anderson in a Singles match to retain the IWGP Intercontinental Championship
13	ROH	Survival of the Fittest	Milwaukee	Bullet Club (A.J. Styles and The Young Bucks (Matt Jackson and Nick Jackson)) defeated The House of Truth (Jay Lethal, Donovan Dijak and Joey Daddiego) in a Six-man tag team match
14	ROH	Survival of the Fittest	Hopkins	Michael Elgin defeated Jay Briscoe, Christopher Daniels, A. C. H. and Silas Young to win Survival of the Fittest tournament final Five-way elimination match. Winner will receive an ROH World Championship match
22	WWE	Survivor Series	Atlanta	Roman Reigns defeated Dean Ambrose in the tournament final to win the vacant WWE World Heavyweight Championship, then Sheamus cashed in his Money in the Bank contract and defeated Reigns (c) in a singles match to win the WWE World Heavyweight Championship.
(c) – denotes defending champion(s)

=== December ===
Date	Promotion(s)	Event	Location	Main event
8	WWE	Tribute to the Troops	Jacksonville, Florida	Dean Ambrose, The Dudley Boyz, Ryback, Kane, The Bloodline (Roman Reigns & The Usos) defeated The League of Nations & The Wyatt Family (Bray Wyatt, Braun Strowman & The Reapers)
13	WWE	TLC: Tables, Ladders & Chairs	Boston	Sheamus (c) defeated Roman Reigns in a Tables, Ladders, and Chairs match to retain the WWE World Heavyweight Championship
16	WWE: NXT	TakeOver: London	London	Finn Bálor (c) defeated Samoa Joe in a Singles match to retain the NXT Championship
18	ROH	Final Battle	Philadelphia	Jay Lethal (c) defeated A.J. Styles in a Singles match to retain the ROH World Championship
(c) – denotes defending champion(s)

== Notable events ==
- August 31 – WWE Performance Center shooting

== Tournaments and accomplishments ==
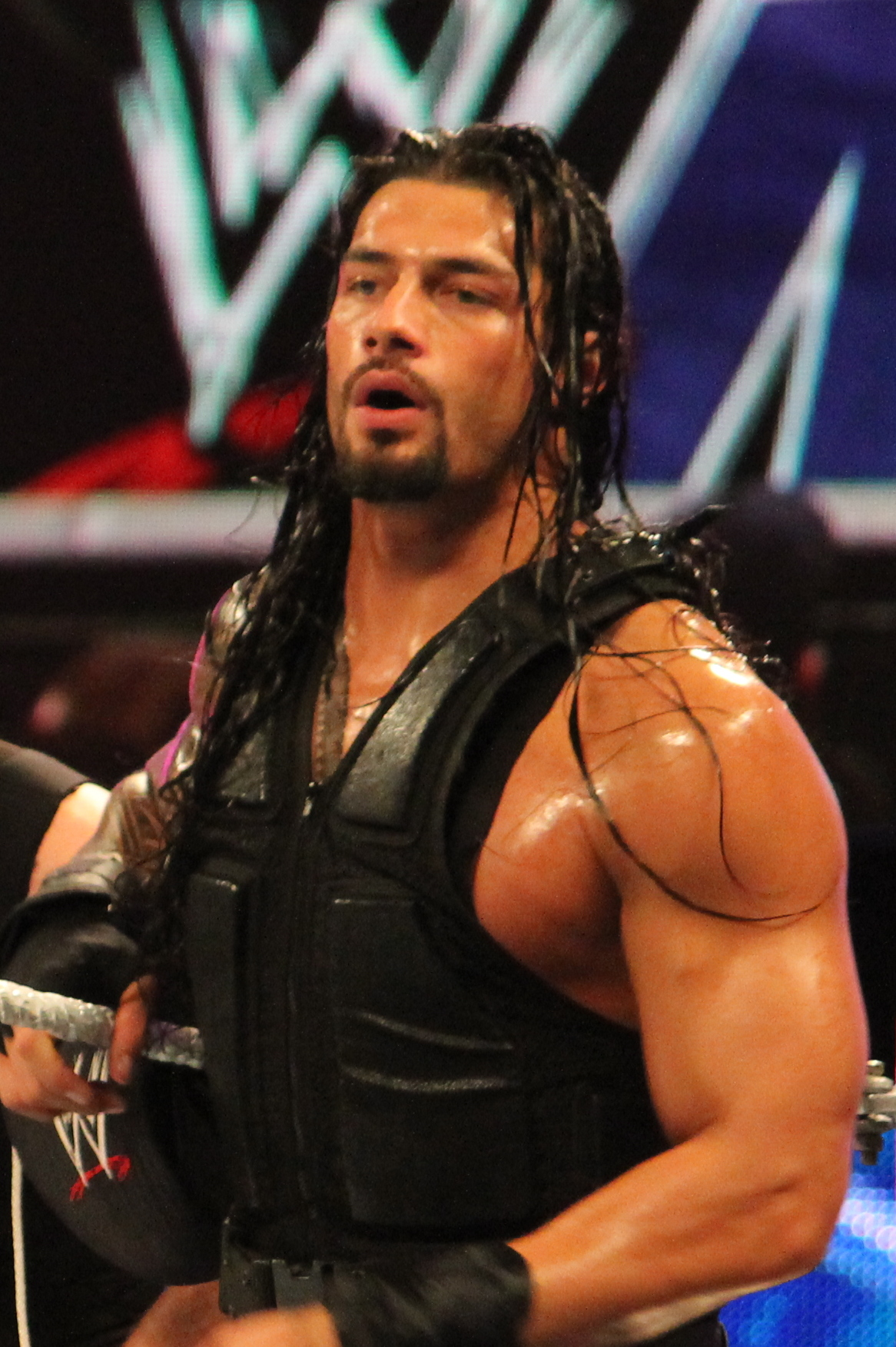
Roman Reigns won the 2015 Royal Rumble match

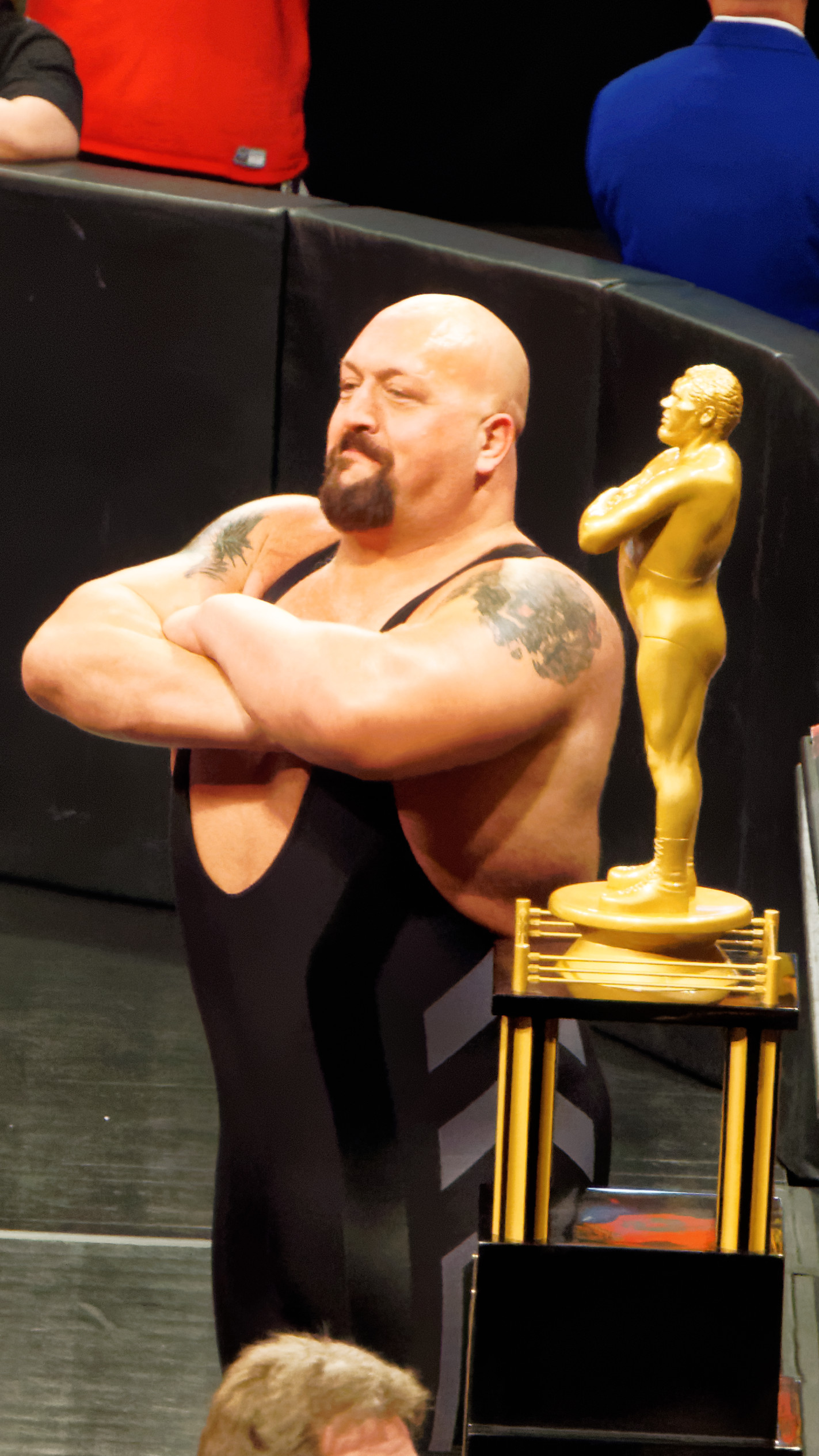
Big Show, the winner of André the Giant Memorial Battle Royal at WrestleMania 31

=== AAA ===
Accomplishment	Winner	Date won	Notes
Rey de Reyes	El Texano Jr.	March 18	
Alas de Oro	Drago	June 14	Last eliminated Super Fly to win.
Copa Antonio Peña	Taurus	October 4	Last eliminated La Parka to win.

=== JWP ===
Accomplishment	Winner	Date won	Notes
Tag League the Best 2015	Aoi Kizuki and Kayoko Haruyama	March 22	

=== Ring of Honor ===
Accomplishment	Winner	Date won	Notes
ROH World Television Championship #1 Contender Tournament	Bobby Fish	July 17	

=== Total Nonstop Action Wrestling ===
Accomplishment	Winner	Date won	Notes
Joker's Wild	Lashley	February 14	
Knockouts Knockdown	Awesome Kong	February 15	
World Cup	Team Hardy (Jeff Hardy, Gunner, Crazzy Steve, Davey Richards, Rockstar Spud, Gail Kim)	February 15	
TNA X Division Championship Tournament	Tigre Uno	June 27	

=== WWE ===
Accomplishment	Winner	Date won	Notes
Royal Rumble	Roman Reigns	January 25	Last eliminated Rusev to win a WWE World Heavyweight Championship match at WrestleMania 31, but was unsuccessful in his match against champion Brock Lesnar due to Seth Rollins cashing in his Money in the Bank contract, converting the singles match into a triple threat match in which Rollins pinned Reigns to win Lesnar's title.
NXT Championship #1 Contender's Tournament	Finn Bálor	February 11	Defeated Adrian Neville in the tournament final to win a match for the NXT Championship on the March 25 episode of NXT, but was unsuccessful against champion Kevin Owens.
Andre the Giant Memorial Battle Royal Qualifying Tournament	Hideo Itami	March 28	Defeated Finn Bálor in the tournament final to win a spot in the battle royal, but was unsuccessful in winning the battle royal.
André the Giant Memorial Battle Royal	Big Show	March 29	Last eliminated Damien Mizdow to win the André the Giant Memorial Trophy.
King of the Ring	Bad News Barrett	April 28	Defeated Neville in the tournament final to win and be crowned King of the Ring. Barrett subsequently changed his ring name to King Barrett.
Money in the Bank ladder match	Sheamus	June 14	Defeated Dolph Ziggler, Kane, Neville, Kofi Kingston, Roman Reigns, and Randy Orton to win a WWE World Heavyweight Championship match contract. Sheamus cashed in and won the title from Reigns at Survivor Series after Reigns had just defeated Dean Ambrose to win the vacant title.
Dusty Rhodes Tag Team Classic	Finn Bálor and Samoa Joe	October 7	Defeated Baron Corbin and Rhyno in the tournament final to win the Dust Rhodes Tag Team Classic Trophy.
WWE World Heavyweight Championship Tournament	Roman Reigns	November 22	Defeated Dean Ambrose in the tournament final to win the vacant WWE World Heavyweight Championship; previous champion Seth Rollins vacated the title due to suffering a legitimate injury.

== Title changes ==
=== AAA ===
AAA Mega Championship
Incoming champion – El Patrón Alberto
Date	Winner	Event/Show	Note(s)
November 9	Vacated	N/A	

AAA Latin American Championship
Incoming champion – Chessman
Date	Winner	Event/Show	Note(s)
August 31	Psycho Clown	Sin Límite	

AAA World Mini-Estrella Championship
Incoming champion – Dinastía
No title changes

AAA World Cruiserweight Championship
Incoming champion – El Hijo del Fantasma
No title changes

AAA Reina de Reinas Championship
Incoming champion – Taya
No title changes

AAA World Tag Team Championship
Incoming champions – Los Perros del Mal (Joe Líder and Pentagón Jr.)
Date	Winner	Event/Show	Note(s)
October 4	Los Güeros del Cielo (Angélico and Jack Evans)	Héroes Inmortales IX	

AAA World Mixed Tag Team Championship
Incoming champions – La Sociedad (Pentagón Jr. and Sexy Star)
No title changes

AAA World Trios Championship
Incoming champions – Los Hell Brothers (Averno, Chessman and Cibernético)
Date	Winner	Event/Show	Note(s)
June 14	Los Hell Brothers (Averno, Chessman and Ricky Marvin)	Verano de Escándalo	

=== NJPW ===
IWGP Heavyweight Championship
Incoming champion – Hiroshi Tanahashi
Date	Winner	Event/Show	Note(s)
February 11	A.J. Styles	The New Beginning in Osaka	
July 5	Kazuchika Okada	Dominion 7.5 in Osaka-jo Hall	

IWGP Intercontinental Championship
Incoming champion – Shinsuke Nakamura
Date	Winner	Event/Show	Note(s)
May 3	Hirooki Goto	Wrestling Dontaku	
September 27	Shinsuke Nakamura	Destruction in Kobe	

IWGP Tag Team Championship
Incoming champions – Bullet Club (Doc Gallows and Karl Anderson)
Date	Winner	Event/Show	Note(s)
January 4	Meiyu Tag (Hirooki Goto and Katsuyori Shibata)	Wrestle Kingdom 9	
February 11	Bullet Club (Doc Gallows and Karl Anderson)	The New Beginning in Osaka	
April 5	The Kingdom (Matt Taven and Michael Bennett)	Invasion Attack	
July 5	Bullet Club (Doc Gallows and Karl Anderson)	Dominion 7.5 in Osaka-jo Hall	

IWGP Junior Heavyweight Championship
Incoming champion – Ryusuke Taguchi
Date	Winner	Event/Show	Note(s)
January 4	Kenny Omega	Wrestle Kingdom 9	
July 5	Kushida	Dominion 7.5 in Osaka-jo Hall	
September 23	Kenny Omega	Destruction in Okayama	

IWGP Junior Heavyweight Tag Team Championship
Incoming champions – reDRagon (Bobby Fish and Kyle O'Reilly)
Date	Winner	Event/Show	Note(s)
February 11	The Young Bucks (Matt Jackson and Nick Jackson)	The New Beginning in Osaka	This was a three-way match, also involving Time Splitters (Alex Shelley and Kushida).
April 5	Roppongi Vice (Beretta and Rocky Romero)	Invasion Attack	
May 3	The Young Bucks (Matt Jackson and Nick Jackson)	Wrestling Dontaku	This was a three-way match, also involving reDRagon (Bobby Fish and Kyle O'Reilly).
August 16	reDRagon (Bobby Fish and Kyle O'Reilly)	G1 Climax 25	

NEVER Openweight Championship
Incoming champion – Tomohiro Ishii
Date	Winner	Event/Show	Note(s)
January 4	Togi Makabe	Wrestle Kingdom 9	
February 14	Vacated	–	The title was vacated due to Togi Makabe being sidelined with influenza.
February 14	Tomohiro Ishii	The New Beginning in Sendai	Defeated Tomoaki Honma to win the vacant title.
April 29	Togi Makabe	Wrestling Hinokuni	
October 12	Tomohiro Ishii	King of Pro-Wrestling	

=== ROH ===
ROH World Championship
Incoming champion – Jay Briscoe
Date	Winner	Event/Show	Note(s)
June 19	Jay Lethal	Best in the World	

ROH World Television Championship
Incoming champion – Jay Lethal
Date	Winner	Event/Show	Note(s)
October 23	Roderick Strong	Glory By Honor XIV	

ROH World Tag Team Championship
Incoming champion(s) – reDRagon (Bobby Fish and Kyle O'Reilly)
Date	Winner	Event/Show	Note(s)
April 4	The Addiction (Christopher Daniels and Frankie Kazarian)	Ring of Honor Wrestling	
September 18	The Kingdom (Matt Taven and Michael Bennett)	All Star Extravaganza VII	
December 18	War Machine (Hanson and Raymond Rowe)	Final Battle	

=== The Crash Lucha Libre ===
The Crash Cruiserweight Championship
Incoming champion – Ángel Metálico
Date	Winner	Event/Show	Note(s)
May 8	Pentagón Jr.	The Crash show	This was a four-way match also involving Drago and Zarco
October 2	Bestia 666	The Crash show	

The Crash Junior Championship
(Title created)
Date	Winner	Event/Show	Note(s)
July 3	Star Dragón	The Crash show	
October 11	Mirage	The Crash show	

The Crash Tag Team Championship
(Title created)
Date	Winner	Event/Show	Note(s)
May 8	Black Boy and Rey Horus	The Crash show	Defeated Bestia 666 and Mosco Negro, and Daga and Steve Pain in the Three way match to become the inaugural champions.
September 18	Tony Casanova and Zarco	The Crash show	

=== TNA ===
TNA World Heavyweight Championship
Incoming champion – Bobby Roode
Date	Winner	Event/Show	Note(s)
January 7	Lashley	Impact Wrestling	
January 31 (aired March 20)	Kurt Angle	Impact Wrestling	
June 25 (aired July 1)	Ethan Carter III	Impact Wrestling	
October 4	Matt Hardy	Bound for Glory	This was a three-way match also involving Drew Galloway. Jeff Hardy was the special guest referee
October 6	Vacated	—	Vacated due to a legal injunction filed by Ethan Carter III as part of the storyline

TNA X Division Championship
Incoming champion – Low Ki
Date	Winner	Event/Show	Note(s)
January 7	Austin Aries	Impact Wrestling	
January 8 (aired January 16)	Low Ki	Impact Wrestling	
January 31 (aired March 20)	Rockstar Spud	Impact Wrestling	Spud invoked his Feast or Fired title opportunity.
March 15 (aired May 1)	Kenny King	Impact Wrestling	This was a four-way ladder match also involving Tigre Uno and Mandrews.
May 10 (aired May 29)	Rockstar Spud	Impact Wrestling	This was a gauntlet match featuring King, Suicide/Manik, Zema Ion, Mandrews, Argos, Crazzy Steve, and Tigre Uno.
May 10 (aired June 10)	Vacated	Impact Wrestling	Rockstar Spud vacated the title in exchange for an opportunity to wrestle for the TNA World Heavyweight Championship.
June 24	Tigre Uno	Impact Wrestling	Tigre Uno defeated Low Ki and Grado in a three-way elimination match to win the vacant championship.

TNA World Tag Team Championship
Incoming champions – The Revolution (Abyss and James Storm)
Date	Winner	Event/Show	Note(s)
January 30 (aired March 6)	The Wolves (Davey Richards and Eddie Edwards)	Impact Wrestling	
March 13 (aired April 3)	Vacated	Impact Wrestling	
March 16 (aired April 17)	The Hardys (Jeff and Matt Hardy)	Impact Wrestling	
May 8	Vacated	Impact Wrestling	Vacated due to Jeff Hardy suffering a broken leg.
June 25 (aired July 1)	The Wolves (Davey Richards and Eddie Edwards)	Impact Wrestling	
July 28 (aired September 2)	Brian Myers and Trevor Lee	Impact Wrestling	
July 29 (aired September 9)	The Wolves (Davey Richards and Eddie Edwards)	Impact Wrestling	

TNA King of the Mountain Championship
(Title reactivated)
Date	Winner	Event/Show	Note(s)
June 28	Jeff Jarrett	Slammiversary	The TNA Television Championship was reactivated on June 25 and renamed the "TNA King of the Mountain Championship." Jeff Jarrett defeated Matt Hardy, Drew Galloway, Eric Young, and Bobby Roode in a King of the Mountain match to win the reactivated championship.
July 27 (aired August 12)	Vacated	Impact Wrestling	The title was vacated after Jeff Jarrett became TNA General Manager.
July 27 (aired August 12)	PJ Black	Impact Wrestling	PJ Black defeated Lashley, Chris Mordetzky, Eric Young, and Robbie E in a King of the Mountain match to win the vacant title.
July 28 (aired September 2)	Bobby Roode	Impact Wrestling	

TNA Knockouts Championship
Incoming champion – Taryn Terrell
Date	Winner	Event/Show	Note(s)
June 25 (aired July 15)	Brooke	Impact Wrestling	Brooke was formerly known as Miss Tessmacher
July 29 (aired September 16)	Gail Kim	Impact Wrestling	Fatal four-way match also involving Awesome Kong and Lei'D Tapa.

=== WWE ===
WWE World Heavyweight Championship
Incoming champion – Brock Lesnar
Date	Winner	Event/Show	Note(s)
March 29	Seth Rollins	WrestleMania 31	Cashed in his Money in the Bank contract during a singles match between Brock Lesnar and Roman Reigns, thus making it a triple threat match. Rollins pinned Reigns to win the championship, thus becoming the first wrestler to cash in their Money in the Bank contract during a match as well as cash-in and win the title without pinning or submitting the champion.
November 4	Vacated	WWE Live	Vacated after Seth Rollins suffered a torn ACL, MCL, and a damaged meniscus at a live show in Dublin, Ireland.
November 22	Roman Reigns	Survivor Series	Defeated Dean Ambrose in a tournament final for the vacant title.
November 22	Sheamus	Survivor Series	Cashed in his Money in the Bank contract.
December 14	Roman Reigns	Monday Night Raw	Title vs. career match

WWE Intercontinental Championship
Incoming champion – Dolph Ziggler
Date	Winner	Event/Show	Note(s)
January 5	Bad News Barrett	Monday Night Raw	Dolph Ziggler originally retained his title against Barrett, but Director of Operations Kane made the match a two-out-of-three falls match, which Barrett won.
March 29	Daniel Bryan	WrestleMania 31	Seven-way ladder match, also involving Dean Ambrose, Dolph Ziggler, Luke Harper, R-Truth, and Stardust.
May 11	Vacated	Monday Night Raw	Vacated due to injury.
May 31	Ryback	Elimination Chamber	Elimination Chamber match for the vacant title, also involving Sheamus, Dolph Ziggler, Mark Henry, R-Truth, and King Barrett (formerly Bad News Barrett).
September 20	Kevin Owens	Night of Champions	
December 13	Dean Ambrose	TLC: Tables, Ladders & Chairs	

WWE United States Championship
Incoming champion – Rusev
Date	Winner	Event/Show	Note(s)
March 29	John Cena	WrestleMania 31	
August 23	Seth Rollins	SummerSlam	Winner Takes All match, in which Rollins also defended the WWE World Heavyweight Championship.
September 20	John Cena	Night of Champions	
October 25	Alberto Del Rio	Hell in a Cell	Open challenge.

WWE Divas Championship
Incoming champion – Nikki Bella
Date	Winner	Event/Show	Note(s)
September 20	Charlotte	Night of Champions	

WWE Tag Team Championship
Incoming champions – The Usos (Jey and Jimmy Uso)
Date	Winner	Event/Show	Note(s)
February 22	Tyson Kidd and Cesaro	Fastlane	
April 26	The New Day (Big E, Kofi Kingston, and Xavier Woods)	Extreme Rules	Big E and Kingston won the match, but Woods was also recognized as champion under the Freebird Rule.
June 14	The Prime Time Players (Darren Young and Titus O'Neil)	Money in the Bank	Big E and Xavier Woods represented The New Day.
August 23	The New Day (Big E, Kofi Kingston, and Xavier Woods)	SummerSlam	Fatal four-way tag team match, also involving The Lucha Dragons and Los Matadores. Big E and Kingston won the match, but Woods was also recognized as champion under the Freebird Rule.

==== NXT ====
NXT Championship
Incoming champion – Sami Zayn
Date	Winner	Event/Show	Note(s)
February 11	Kevin Owens	TakeOver: Rival	Owens won when the referee decided that Sami Zayn was unable to continue.
July 4	Finn Bálor	The Beast in the East	

NXT Women's Championship
Incoming champion – Charlotte
Date	Winner	Event/Show	Note(s)
February 11	Sasha Banks	TakeOver: Rival	Fatal four-way match, also involving Bayley and Becky Lynch.
August 22	Bayley	TakeOver: Brooklyn	

NXT Tag Team Championship
Incoming champions – The Lucha Dragons (Kalisto and Sin Cara)
Date	Winner	Event/Show	Note(s)
January 15 (aired January 28)	Blake and Murphy (Wesley Blake and Buddy Murphy)	NXT	During their reign, their ringnames were shortened to Blake and Murphy, respectively.
August 22	The Vaudevillains (Aiden English and Simon Gotch)	TakeOver: Brooklyn	
October 22 (aired November 11)	The Revival (Dash Wilder and Scott Dawson)	NXT	They won the titles as Dash and Dawson. During their reign, they were renamed to The Revival.

== Awards and honors ==
=== AAA Hall of Fame ===
Inductee
Héctor Garza
El Hijo del Perro Aguayo

=== Pro Wrestling Illustrated ===
Category	Winner
Wrestler of the Year	Seth Rollins
Tag Team of the Year	The New Day (Big E, Kofi Kingston and Xavier Woods)
Match of the Year	Bayley vs. Sasha Banks (NXT TakeOver: Respect)
Feud of the Year	Brock Lesnar vs. The Undertaker
Most Popular Wrestler of the Year	Dean Ambrose
Most Hated Wrestler of the Year	Seth Rollins
Comeback of the Year	The Undertaker
Most Improved Wrestler of the Year	Roman Reigns
Inspirational Wrestler of the Year	Bayley
Rookie of the Year	Moose
Woman of the Year	Sasha Banks
Stanley Weston Award (Lifetime Achievement)	Roddy Piper

=== TNA Hall of Fame ===
Inductee
Jeff Jarrett
Earl Hebner

=== Wrestling Observer Newsletter ===
==== Wrestling Observer Newsletter Hall of Fame ====
Category	Inductee
Individual	Brock Lesnar
Individual	Shinsuke Nakamura
Individual	Perro Aguayo, Jr.
Individual	Ivan Koloff
Individual	Carlos Colón
Individual	Eddie Quinn
Group	The Assassins (Jody Hamilton and Tom Renesto)

==== Wrestling Observer Newsletter awards ====
Category	Winner
Wrestler of the Year	A.J. Styles
Most Outstanding	A.J. Styles
Tag Team of the Year	The Young Bucks (Matt and Nick Jackson)
Most Improved	Bayley

=== WWE ===
==== WWE Hall of Fame ====
Category	Inductee	Inducted by
Individual	Randy Savage	Hulk Hogan
Individual	Rikishi	The Usos
Individual	Alundra Blayze	Natalya Neidhart
Individual	Larry Zbyszko	Bruno Sammartino
Individual	Tatsumi Fujinami	Ric Flair
Individual	Kevin Nash	Shawn Michaels
Group	The Bushwhackers	John Laurinaitis
Celebrity	Arnold Schwarzenegger	Triple H
Warrior Award	Connor "The Crusher" Michalek	Dana Warrior and Daniel Bryan

==== Slammy Awards ====
Poll	Winner
Tag Team of the Year	The Usos (Jimmy Uso and Jey Uso)
Best John Cena's U.S. Open Challenge	vs. Cesaro on Raw (July 6)
Hashtag of the Year	#SuplexCity
Celebrity Moment of the Year	Stephen Amell dives onto Stardust and King Barrett at SummerSlam
"Tell Me You Didn't Just Say That" Insult of the Year	Brock Lesnar coins "Suplex City" at WrestleMania 31
Rivalry of the Year	The Undertaker vs. Brock Lesnar
Best Original WWE Network Show	Stone Cold Podcast
Double-Cross of the Year	Damien Mizdow eliminates The Miz from the Andre the Giant Memorial Battle Royal at WrestleMania 31
Extreme Moment of the Year	Roman Reigns attacks Sheamus, Alberto Del Rio, Rusev, and Triple H with a steel chair at TLC: Tables, Ladders and Chairs
Breakout Star of the Year	Neville
LOL! Moment of the Year	R-Truth mistakes himself of being in the Money in the Bank ladder match on Raw. (June 8)
The "OMG!" Shocking Moment of the Year	Kalisto executes Salida del Sol off the top of a ladder through another ladder on Jey Uso at TLC: Tables, Ladders and Chairs
Superstar of the Year	Seth Rollins
"The Hero in All of Us" Award, presented by Coca-Cola	John Cena
Surprise Return of the Year	Sting returns, as Seth Rollins' statue, and attacks Rollins on Raw. (August 24)
Diva of the Year	Nikki Bella
"This is Awesome!" Moment of the Year	The Rock and Ronda Rousey attack Triple H and Stephanie McMahon at WrestleMania 31.
Match of the Year	Brock Lesnar vs. The Undertaker in a Hell in a Cell match at Hell in a Cell

==== NXT Year-End Awards ====
Poll	Winner
Tag Team of the Year	Enzo Amore and Colin Cassady
Female Competitor of the Year	Bayley
Male Competitor of the Year	Finn Bálor
TakeOver of the Year	NXT TakeOver: Brooklyn
Match of the Year	Sasha Banks (c) vs. Bayley for the NXT Women's Championship at NXT TakeOver: Brooklyn
Overall Competitor of the Year	Finn Bálor

== Debuts ==
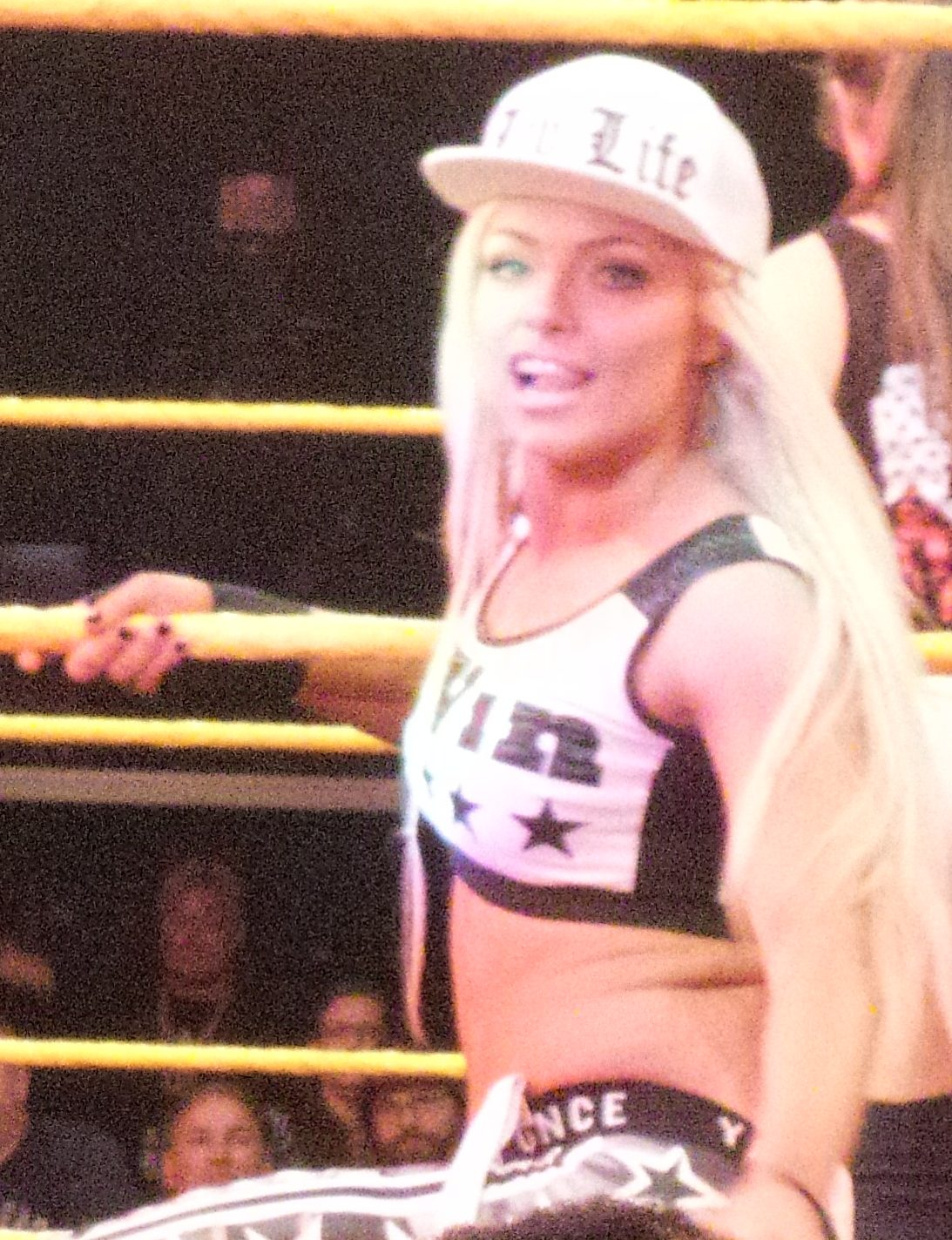
Liv Morgan

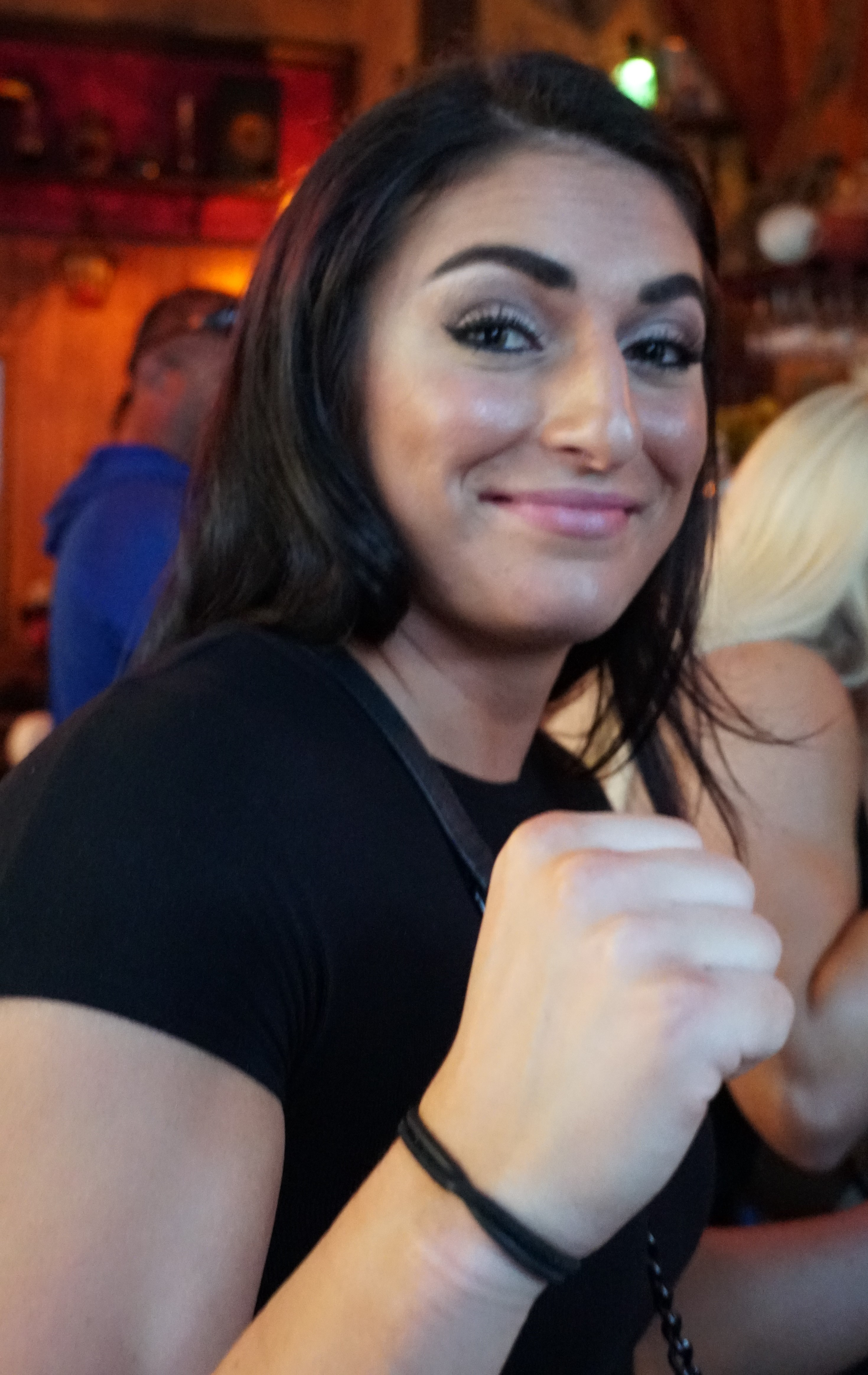
Sonya Deville

- Date unknown – Alex Coughlin (NJPW)
- January 31 – Baliyan Akki
- February 13 – Kuma Arashi and Maxwell Jacob Friedman
- February 27 - Willow Nightingale
- February 28 – Hyper Misao
- March 8 – Senza Volto
- April 4 – Akam and Ace Austin
- April 30 – Kazumi Kikuta
- May 2
  - Delmi Exo
  - Lyra Valkyria
  - Jamie Hayter
  - Takehiro Yamamura
- May 6 – Flip Gordon
- May 7 – Nia Jax
- May 17 – Fuminori Abe and Karl Fredericks
- May 23 - KC Navarro
- May 31
  - Maika Ozaki
  - Nao Kakuta
  - Natsupoi
  - Saori Anou
  - Tae Honma
- June 6 – Cole Radrick
- June 26
  - Atticus Cogar
  - Otis Cogar
- June 27 – Liv Morgan
- July 12 – Mika Iwata
- August 2 – Connor Mills
- August 15 – Silas Mason
- August 23
  - Mao
  - Mizuki Watase
- August 25
  - Mandy Rose
  - Sara Lee
- August 29 – Francesco Akira
- September 6 – Shu Asakawa
- September 11 – Kaito Ishida
- September 26 – Jeet Rama (NXT)
- October 4 – Yuto Kikuchi
- October 24 – Otis
- November 1 – Ayato Yoshida
- December 22 – Nodoka Tenma
- December 30 – Sonya Deville

== Retirements ==
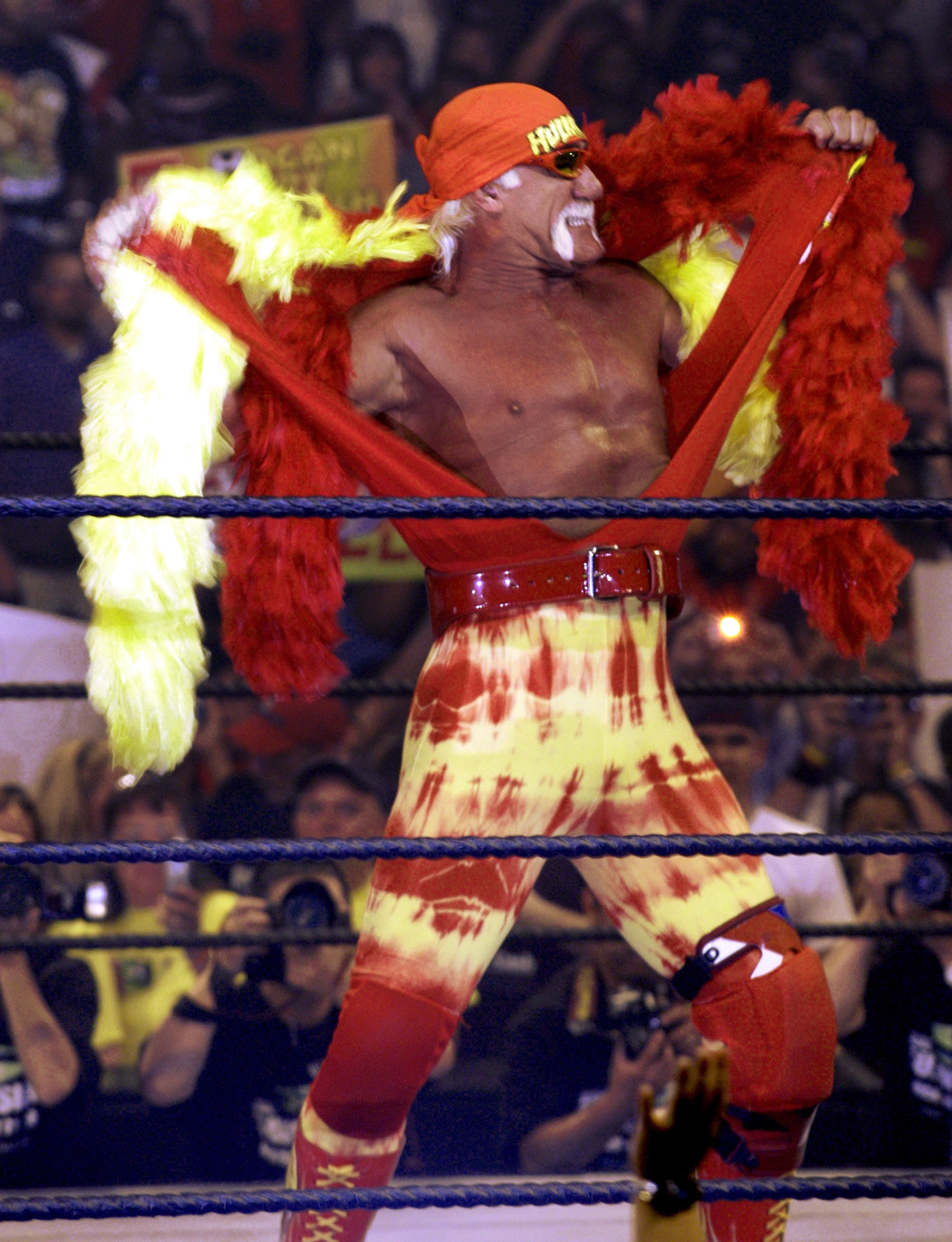
Hulk Hogan

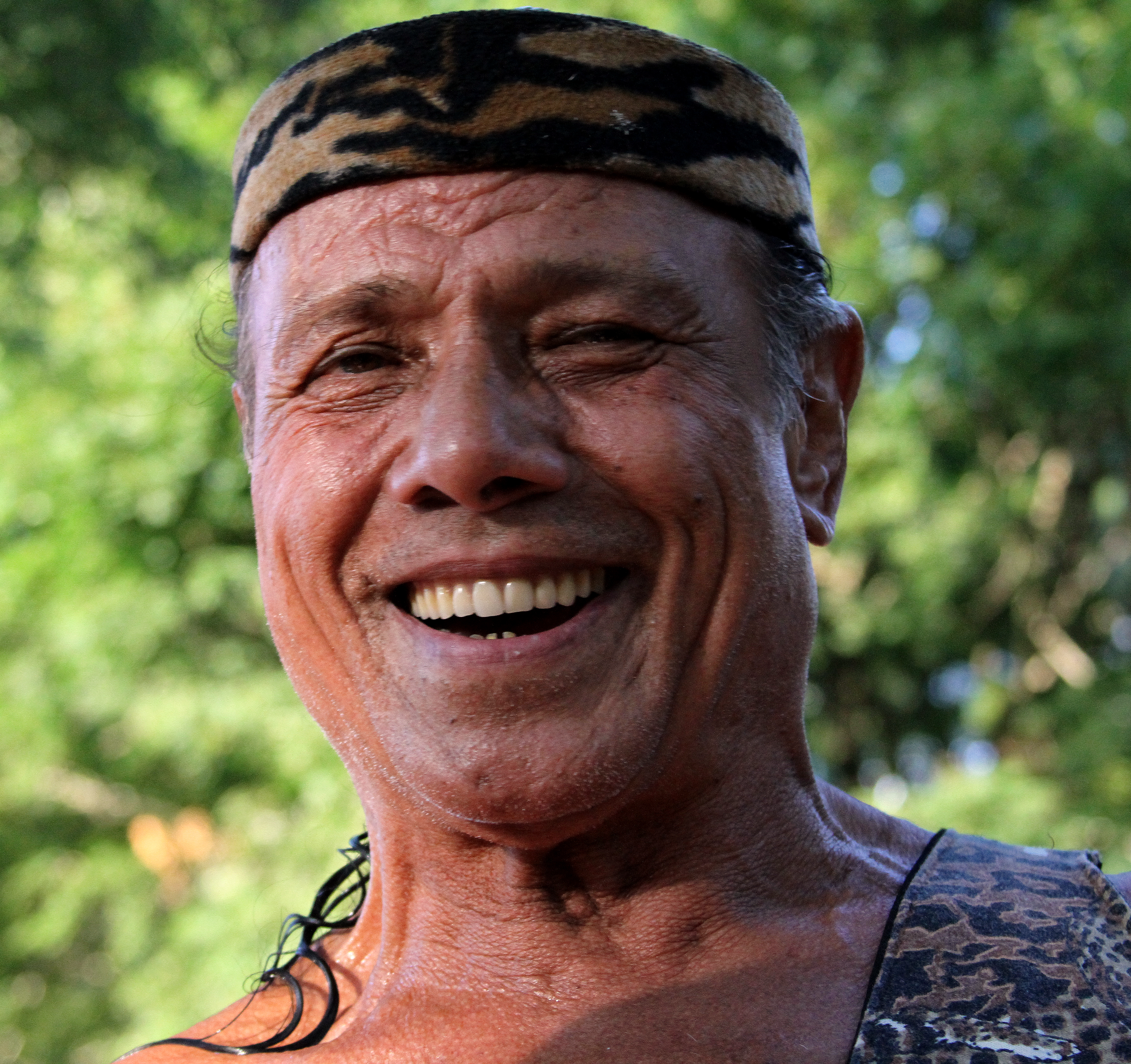
Jimmy Snuka

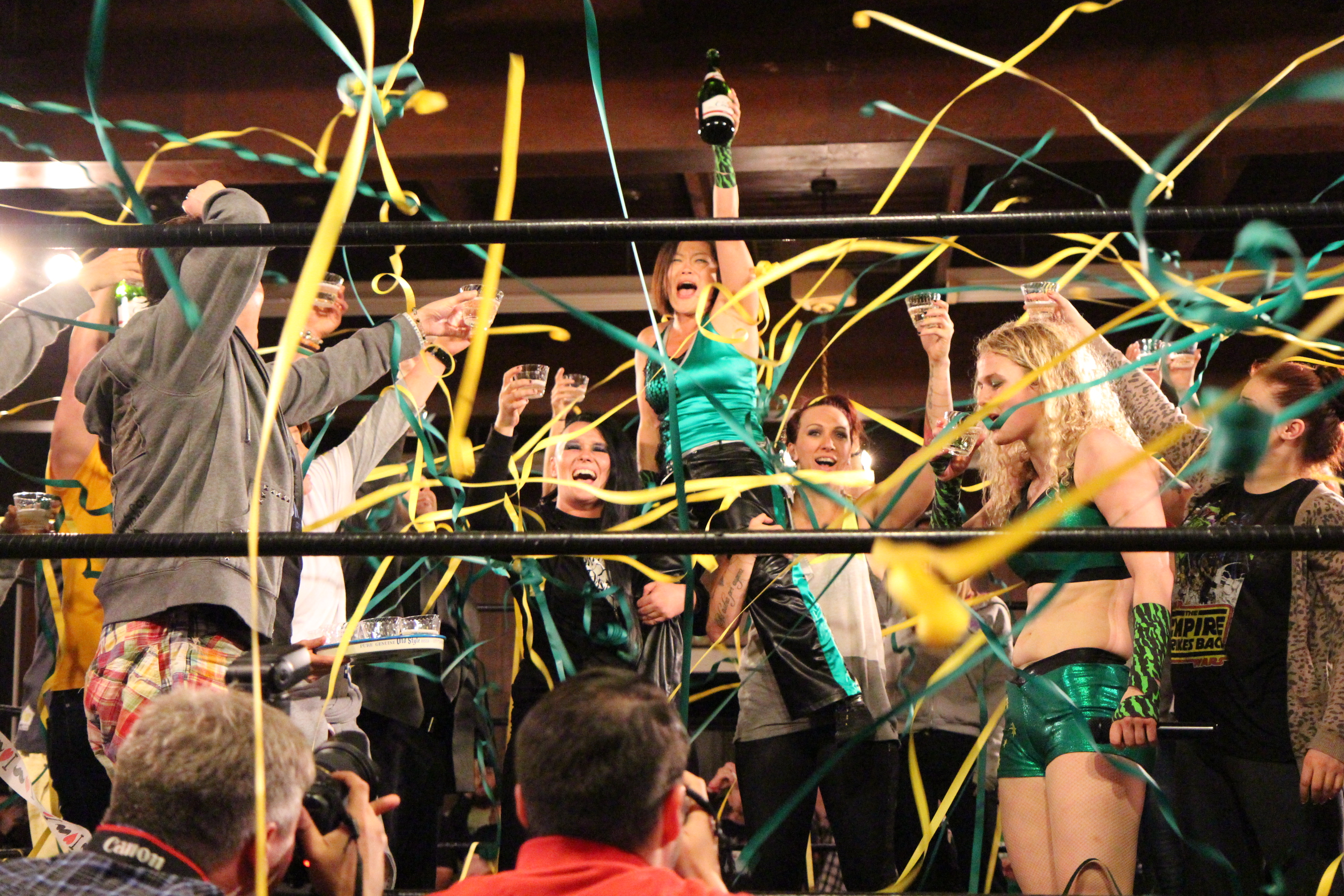
Tomoka Nakagawa's final match took place at SHIMMER Volume 75. Nakagawa and Kellie Skater defeated the Canadian NINJAs (Nicole Matthews & Portia Perez) in the main event. Immediately afterwards a retirement ceremony was held and her career was celebrated by the entire roster.

- Brazo de Oro (1975–2015)
- Road Dogg (1986-2015, became a WWE producer)
- Mikey Whipwreck (1994–2015)
- AJ Lee (September 29, 2007 – April 3, 2015)
- Tomoka Nakagawa (September 19, 2004 – April 12, 2015)
- Takeshi Morishima (March 22, 1998 – April 21, 2015)
- El Matematico (1968-May 17, 2015)
- Johnny Saint (1958-June 13, 2015)
- David Otunga (May 29, 2009 - July 5, 2015) (became a color commentator)
- Serena Deeb (March 2005 - July 10, 2015) (returned in 2017 for the inaugural Mae Young Classic)
- Traci Brooks (2001 – July 18, 2015)
- Layla (August 16, 2006 – July 29, 2015)
- Jimmy Snuka (1968 – September 2015)
- Portia Perez (December 2003 – October 11, 2015)
- Ezekiel Jackson (June 27, 2007 – October 18, 2015)
- Mio Shirai (March 4, 2007 – September 20, 2015)
- Genichiro Tenryu (November 13, 1976 – November 15, 2015)
- Kid Kash (1990 – December 2015)
- Act Yasukawa (February 5, 2012 – December 23, 2015)
- Neko Nitta (March 2, 2011 – December 31, 2015)

== Deaths ==
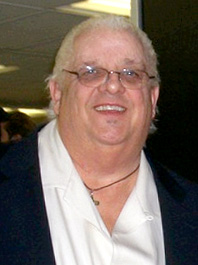
Dusty Rhodes

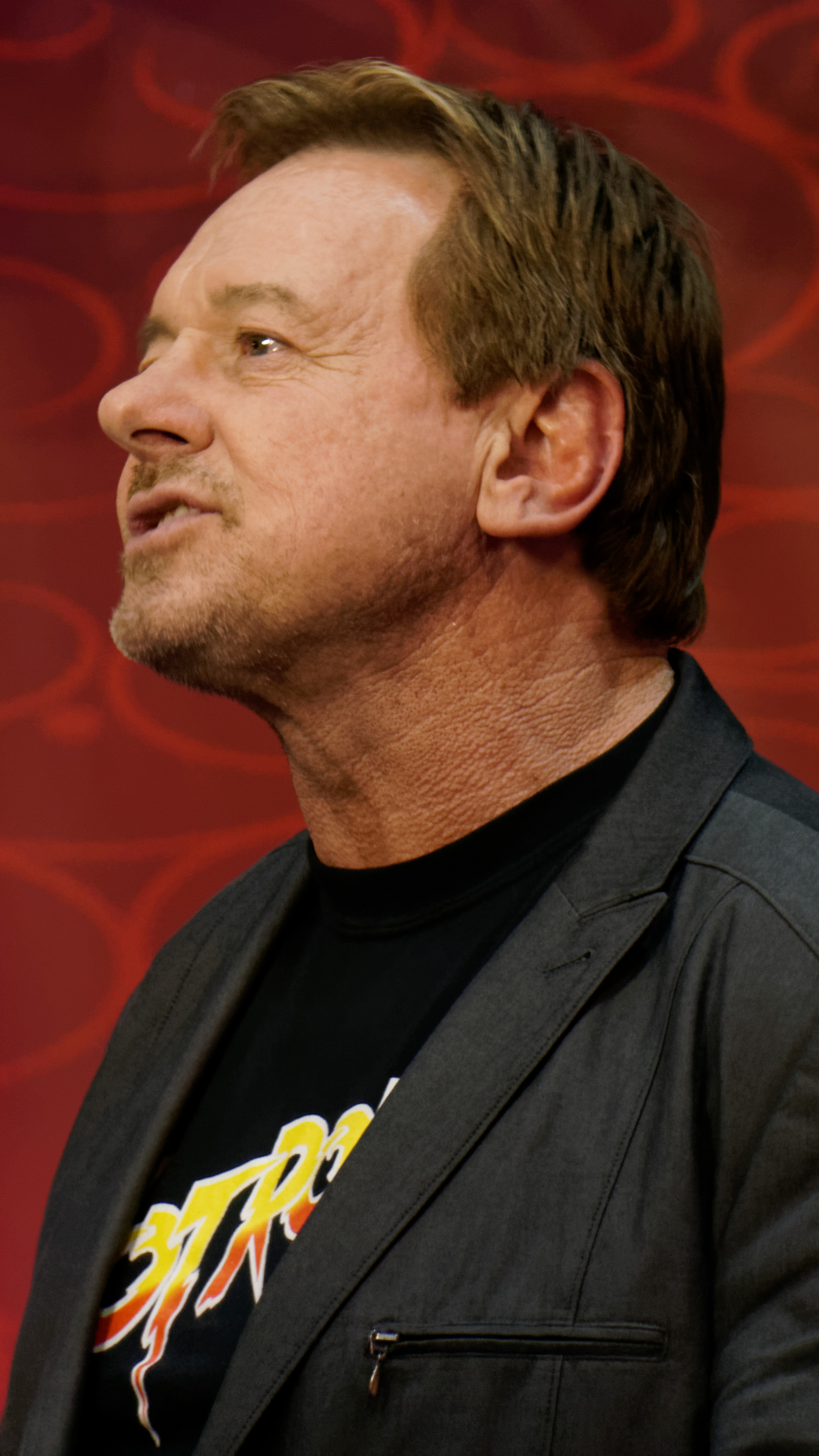
Roddy Piper

- January 7 – Tim Arson, 38
- January 13 - Brutus Malumba, 93
- January 27 – Larry Winters, 58
- February 9 – Drew McDonald, 59
- February 10 – Daniel Brand, 79
- February 13 - Tony Charles, 79
- February 14 - Wim Ruska, 74
- March 4 – Iwao Horiuchi, 73
- March 20 – Cincinnati Red, 40
- March 21 – Perro Aguayo, Jr., 35
- April 5 – Steve Rickard, 85
- April 21 - Ron Wright, 76
- April 27 – Verne Gagne, 89
- April 28 - Ashura Hara, 68
- June 1:
  - Tommy Rogers, 54
  - Mike Lane, 82
- June 11 – Dusty Rhodes, 69
- June 21 – Cora Combs, 92
- June 22 – Buddy Landel, 52
- July 1 – Curly Moe, 53
- July 9 - Samoan Joe, 66
- July 31 – Roddy Piper, 61
- November 8 - Don Fargo, 84
- November 14 – Nick Bockwinkel, 80
- November 26 - Tommy Gilbert, 75
- November 28 - Stan Holek, 82
- December 5 – Hack Meyers, 41
- December 16 – Lizmark, 64
- December 21 – Emmanuel Yarbrough, 51

== See also ==
- List of GFW events and specials
- List of NJPW pay-per-view events
- List of ROH pay-per-view events
- List of TNA pay-per-view events
- List of WWE Network events
- List of WWE pay-per-view events
