= Bound for Glory (2015) =

2015 Total Nonstop Action Wrestling pay-per-view event

- Promotional poster featuring various TNA wrestlers
- Promotion: Total Nonstop Action Wrestling
- Date: October 4, 2015
- City: Concord, North Carolina
- Venue: Cabarrus Arena
- Attendance: 1,800

Pay-per-view chronology
← Previous; Slammiversary	Next → Slammiversary

Bound for Glory chronology
← Previous; 2014	Next → 2016

The 2015 Bound for Glory was a professional wrestling pay-per-view (PPV) event produced by Total Nonstop Action Wrestling (TNA). It took place on October 4, 2015 at the Cabarrus Arena in Concord, North Carolina. It was the eleventh event in the Bound for Glory chronology and the second and last pay-per-view event of 2015.

Eight matches, one of which was a dark match, took place at the event. In the main event, Matt Hardy defeated defending champion Ethan Carter III and Drew Galloway in a triple threat match to win the TNA World Heavyweight Championship, in which Matt's brother, Jeff Hardy, was the special guest referee. In other prominent matches, Gail Kim defeated Awesome Kong to retain the TNA Knockouts Championship, Kurt Angle defeated Eric Young in a Career Threatening match, and in the opening contest, Tigre Uno defeated Andrew Everett, DJZ and Manik in a Fatal four-way match to retain the Impact X Division Championship.

In October 2017, with the launch of the Global Wrestling Network, the event became available to stream on demand.

== Storylines ==
Bound for Glory featured professional wrestling matches involving different wrestlers from pre-existing scripted feuds and storylines. Wrestlers portrayed villains, heroes, or less distinguishable characters in the scripted events that built tension and culminate in a wrestling match or series of matches.

In mid–2007 when TNA officials decided to create a women's division in the company, Gail Kim went on to become the first ever TNA Women's Knockout Champion at Bound for Glory (2007). Ever since she won the title, Kim entered a feud with Awesome Kong, which led to a few matches between the two that ended with Kong winning the title and Kim leaving TNA. After leaving TNA as well, Kong returned in 2015 and slowly reconciled her feud with Kim. On the September 16 episode of Impact Wrestling, Kim defeated Kong, Brooke and Lei'D Tapa in a fatal–four-way match to win the TNA Women's Knockout Championship for the fifth time. On the next day, it was announced on Facebook by TNA that Kim would defend the championship against Kong at the event.

On the September 23 episode of Impact Wrestling, it was announced that Tigre Uno would defend the TNA X Division Championship in an Ultimate X match against DJ Z, Manik and Andrew Everett.

On the September 23 episode of Impact Wrestling, after winning a five-way elimination match against Bram, Lashley, Davey Richards and Eddie Edwards; Drew Galloway became the number one contender for Ethan Carter III's TNA World Heavyweight Championship. TNA president — Dixie Carter announced that the following week she would announce a special guest referee for that title match. On the September 30 episode of Impact Wrestling, Carter announced that if Galloway and Matt Hardy defeat Ethan Carter III and Tyrus in the main event, Hardy would enter the title match. Hardy and Galloway won, making the main event a triple–threat match. Afterwards, Dixie Carter announced that Jeff Hardy would serve as the special guest referee for that match.

Another match scheduled for the event was a tag team match between The Wolves (Davey Richards and Eddie Edwards) against Brian Myers and Trevor Lee for the TNA World Tag Team Championship. The Wolves won the vacant title back on the July 1 episode of Impact Wrestling, after defeating Austin Aries and Bobby Roode in a 30-minute Iron Man match. They lost the championship to Myers and Lee on September 2 and regained the title on the September 9 episode of Impact Wrestling. This was serving as a rematch clause for Myers and Lee.

Other on-screen personnel
Commentator	Josh Mathews
Commentator	D'Angelo Dinero
Ring announcer	Christy Hemme
Referee	Earl Hebner
Referee	Brian Hebner
Referee	Brian Stiffler
Interviewers	Jeremy Borash

After losing the TNA World Heavyweight Championship to Ethan Carter III, Kurt Angle underwent a surgery and was out of action up to two months. Angle later announced that he would compete at the event in his final match for TNA against Eric Young, after which he would take a sabbatical from wrestling and wouldn't re–sign his contract with TNA.

On September 28, a Gauntlet for the Gold match, titled "Bound for Gold", between Abyss, Aiden O'Shea, Chris Melendez, Eli Drake, Jessie Godderz, Mahabali Shera, Mr. Anderson, Robbie E and Tyrus was announced on ImpactWrestling.com, where the winner would receive a future match for the TNA World Heavyweight Championship.

On the September 30 episode of Impact Wrestling, Bobby Roode issued an open challenge for his TNA King of the Mountain Championship, which Lashley would accept. The match between the two was scheduled for the event.

== Aftermath ==
On October 7, 2015, it was announced that a tournament that was taped on July 22–25, 2015 would take place, after TNA World Heavyweight Champion Matt Hardy vacated the title a day prior due to a legal injunction filed by former champion Ethan Carter III. The World Title Series places 32 wrestlers into 8 groups of 4, with the first round being under a round-robin format which was called Group Play. Also, for the first time ever, the Knockouts would have a chance to compete for the World Heavyweight Championship.

Each winner in the round-robin matches is awarded 3 points, and a draw is worth 1 point for each, with each match having a 15-minute time limit. The two members of each group with the most points will advance to the final 16, where at that point the tournament switches to a single elimination format.

The winner of the tournament would become the new TNA World Heavyweight Champion.

== Results ==
No.	Results	Stipulations	Times
1^{D}	Shawn Shultz defeated John Skyler	Singles match	—
2	Tigre Uno (c) defeated Andrew Everett, DJZ and Manik	Ultimate X match for the TNA X Division Championship	10:02
3	Tyrus won by last eliminating Mr. Anderson	12-man Bound for Gold Gauntlet match; where the winner could choose any championship match of their choice	24:30
4	The Wolves (Davey Richards and Eddie Edwards) (c) defeated Brian Myers and Trevor Lee	Tag team match for the TNA World Tag Team Championship	11:23
5	Bobby Roode (c) defeated Lashley	Singles match for the TNA King Of The Mountain Championship	14:17
6	Gail Kim (c) defeated Awesome Kong	Singles match for the TNA Knockouts Championship	10:05
7	Kurt Angle defeated Eric Young by submission	Career Threatening match	13:10
8	Matt Hardy defeated Ethan Carter III (c) and Drew Galloway	Three-way match for the TNA World Heavyweight Championship with Jeff Hardy as special guest referee	20:04
(c) / – the champion(s) heading into the match; D / – this was a dark match

=== Bound for Gold Gauntlet entrances and eliminations ===
Draw	Entrant	Order	Eliminated by	Time
1	Mr. Anderson	11	Pinned by Tyrus	24:30
2	Jessie Godderz	10	Anderson	22:09
3	Eli Drake	1	Snow	8:41
4	Al Snow	3	Tyrus	13:52
5	Aiden O'Shea	2	Shera	10:43
6	Robbie E	8	Godderz	21:12
7	Mahabali Shera	5	Tyrus	14:15
8	Tyrus	-	Winner	N/A
9	Chris Melendez	4	Tyrus	13:56
10	Tommy Dreamer	9	Anderson	21:38
11	Abyss	7	Tyrus	3:25
12	D'Angelo Dinero	6	Himself	0:25

== See also ==
- 2015 in professional wrestling
