= Slammiversary (2015) =

2015 Total Nonstop Action Wrestling pay-per-view event

- Promotional poster featuring Kurt Angle holding the TNA World Heavyweight Championship
- Promotion: Total Nonstop Action Wrestling
- Date: June 28, 2015
- City: Orlando, Florida
- Venue: Impact Zone
- Tagline: "The Return of the King of the Mountain"

Pay-per-view chronology
← Previous; Bound for Glory	Next → Bound for Glory

Slammiversary chronology
← Previous; XII	Next → 2016

The 2015 Slammiversary was a professional wrestling pay-per-view (PPV) event produced by Total Nonstop Action Wrestling (TNA). It was live from Impact Zone, Orlando, Florida. It was the eleventh event under the Slammiversary chronology, and the first event in the 2015 TNA PPV schedule. This was the first Slammiversary pay-per-view to feature a King of the Mountain match since Slammiversary 2009. It was also the first King of the Mountain match in which the winner will be crowned the TNA King of the Mountain Champion.

In October 2017, with the launch of the Global Wrestling Network, the event became available to stream on demand.

== Production ==
Other on-screen personnel
Commentator	Josh Mathews
Commentator	Mike Tenay
Commentator	D'Angelo Dinero
Ring announcer	Jeremy Borash
Referee	Earl Hebner
Referee	Brian Hebner
Referee	Brian Stiffler
Interviewers	McKenzie Mitchell

=== Background ===
Slammiversary followed four straight days of TNA taping future episodes of Impact Wrestling. Due to the episodes set to air after the PPV, the live Slammiversary featured Taryn Terrell as the TNA Knockouts Champion even though she had already lost the title and Ethan Carter III being billed as the number one contender to the TNA World Heavyweight Championship, despite already having won the title. In addition, Austin Aries and Davey Richards wrestled for the right to choose a stipulation for a match that had already occurred.

=== Storylines ===
Slammiversary featured professional wrestling matches involving different wrestlers from pre-existing scripted feuds and storylines. Wrestlers portrayed villains, heroes, or less distinguishable characters in the scripted events that built tension and culminated in a wrestling match or series of matches.

On the April 24 edition of Impact Wrestling, Magnus and Mickie James both came down to the ring to announce Mickie's retirement from professional wrestling to focus on raising their son, but were interrupted by James Storm, who managed to convince her not to. Magnus was later approached backstage by Davey Richards, who warned Magnus to not trust Storm, after which Magnus asked a member of the camera crew to follow Mickie around to keep an eye on her. After consulting the footage the crew gathered, Magnus confronted Storm and warned him to stay out of his and Mickie's business. On the May 15 edition of Impact Wrestling, the two would have another confrontation where Storm would provoke Magnus into attacking him with a guitar, officially igniting their feud. The following week, Magnus called out Storm for a fight, only to instead be met by former rival and Storm's The Revolution teammate Abyss, and eventually the rest of The Revolution members Manik and Khoya, later that night Storm confronted them and told them that this is between him and Mickie James and they have nothing to do with them. On the June 3 edition of Impact Wrestling, James Storm met Mickie in Nashville, Tennessee, where Storm would push Mickie down onto train tracks. Storm afterwards called Magnus with Mickie's phone, warning him that he is coming. On June 17, Magnus would charge into the Impact Zone and say that he's halting the show and that he would not leave until Storm showed up. After security emerged, Storm would show up and talk about Magnus and his family, which caused Magnus to try desperately to reach Storm, but security repeatedly stood in his way until Magnus fought them off. When Magnus charged toward Storm, Storm kicked a stroller off the stage. Magnus panicked believing that inside the stroller was his son, but found out that the "baby" was only a doll.

On June 16, TNA announced on their website that for the first time in six years, the King of the Mountain match would return at Slammiversary. On the June 24 live edition of Impact Wrestling, Jeff Jarrett, alongside Karen Jarrett, made a surprise return and announced his participation in the match. On June 25 TNA announced on their website the four competitors that would join Jarrett in the King of the Mountain match: Matt Hardy, Eric Young, Drew Galloway and Bobby Roode, with the prize being the newly reactivated and renamed TNA King of the Mountain Championship.

On April 17, after losing a tag team match to the Dirty Heels, Jessie Godderz and Robbie E got into a brawl, disbanding The BroMans and turning Robbie E face. On May 15, after Robbie E defeated Godderz three times in the same night, Godderz hit Robbie E with a microphone, and afterwards Godderz placed a chair around Robbie E's neck and slammed it into one of the ring posts. On June 17, Godderz would defeat DJ Z via submission, Robbie E would come out after the match and attack Godderz. On June 18, TNA announced that Godderz would face Robbie E at Slammiversary.

On June 22, it was announced on Facebook by TNA that The Dollhouse (Taryn Terrell, Jade and Marti Bell) would face Brooke and Awesome Kong in a 3-on-2 Handicap match at Slammiversary.

On June 24 live edition of Impact Wrestling it was announced that Lashley and Mr. Anderson would face Ethan Carter III and Tyrus at Slammiversary.

At Destination X, Bram would cut a promo stating that he would "rewrite history" and challenged any TNA wrestler from the past, Crimson would answer the challenge and be defeated by Bram. The following week, Bram defeated Joseph Park. On the June 24 live edition of Impact Wrestling, Vader would answer the challenge and win the match via disqualification after Bram hit Vader with a foreign object, Bram would go on to continue the attack until Matt Morgan made the save, later that night TNA would announce that Bram would face Morgan at Slammiversary.

After The Wolves vacated the TNA World Tag Team Championship due to an injury to Eddie Edwards, an Ultimate X match was held for the titles on the April 17 edition of Impact Wrestling. The Hardys defeated The Beat Down Clan (Kenny King and Low Ki), Ethan Carter III and Bram, and Rockstar Spud and Mr. Anderson to win the match and the titles for the first time as a team. However, the Hardys vacated the titles afterwards after Jeff suffered a broken tibia. On the May 8 live edition of Impact Wrestling, The Dirty Heels (Bobby Roode and Austin Aries) would come out wanting the tag team championship. Davey Richards would come out and announce the return of Eddie Edwards, setting up a Best of 5 Series for the tag team championship. On the May 15 edition of Impact Wrestling, The Wolves would defeat Roode and Aries in the first match of the series. On the May 29 edition of Impact Wrestling, The Wolves defeated The Dirty Heels in the second match of the series. The following week The Dirty Heels defeated The Wolves after a low blow and chair shot in the third match of the series. On June 17, Austin Aries wasn't medically cleared to wrestle, therefore a match was set between Eddie Edwards and Bobby Roode were the winner of that match will be able to choose the stipulation for match four in the series, in which Edwards was victorious, and announced that match four would be a Full Metal Mayhem, in which The Dirty Heels were victorious. At Slammiversary, a match was set between Richards and Aries where the winner get to pick the stipulation for the fifth match in the series, that would take place on the July 1 special edition of Impact Wrestling, Bell To Bell, with the TNA World Tag Team Championship on the line.

On June 28, it was announced on Twitter that Slammiversary's opening match would be a three-way elimination match for the TNA X Division Championship, where the X Division Champion Tigre Uno would defend his title against Manik and DJ Z.

== Aftermath ==
Three days after Slammiversary, on the July 1 episode of Impact Wrestling, Ethan Carter III defeated Kurt Angle for the TNA World Heavyweight Championship. After winning the championship, Carter teased Dixie Carter's return. On the July 8 episode of Impact Wrestling, Dixie Carter made her first televised appearance after a nearly year long absence, criticizing Ethan Carter III's villainous actions and apologizing to the fans for her own past actions, saying that she would not make those same mistakes again, turning Dixie into a fan favorite once again.

Also on the July 1 episode of Impact Wrestling, The Wolves defeated The Dirty Heels (Bobby Roode and Austin Aries) for the TNA World Tag Team Championship after Austin Aries would defeat Davey Richards at the Slammiversary event.

=== Reception ===
Slammiversary received mixed reviews from critics. Much of the positive reception went to the Aries - Richards match, and the Storm - Magnus match. However, Magnus's promo before the match was universally criticized.

== Results ==
No.	Results	Stipulations	Times
1	Tigre Uno (c) defeated DJZ and Manik	Three-way elimination match for the TNA X Division Championship	12:06
2	Robbie E defeated Jessie Godderz	Singles Match	11:20
3	Bram defeated Matt Morgan	Street Fight	09:30
4	Austin Aries defeated Davey Richards	Singles match; the winner gets to pick the stipulation for match 5 for the TNA World Tag Team Championship at Bell to Bell.	17:15
5	Brooke and Awesome Kong defeated The Dollhouse (Jade, Marti Bell and Taryn Terrell)	3-on-2 Handicap match	8:05
6	James Storm defeated Magnus	Non-sanctioned match	16:40
7	Ethan Carter III and Tyrus defeated Lashley and Mr. Anderson	Tag team match	10:10
8	Jeff Jarrett (with Karen Jarrett) defeated Bobby Roode, Matt Hardy, Eric Young and Drew Galloway	King of the Mountain match for the vacant TNA King of the Mountain Championship	20:25
(c) / – the champion(s) heading into the match

=== Three-way elimination match ===
Elimination	Wrestler	Eliminated by	Elimination move	Time
1	DJ Z	Tigre Uno	Pinned after a split-legged corkscrew senton	9:35
2	Manik	Tigre Uno	Pinned after a split-legged corkscrew senton	12:07
Winner:	Tigre Uno			

=== King of the Mountain match statistics ===
No.	Wrestler	Wrestler pinned or made to submit	Method
1	Bobby Roode	Jeff Jarrett	Pinned with a schoolboy
2	Eric Young	Jeff Jarrett	Pinned after a DDT on the floor
3	Matt Hardy	Bobby Roode	Pinned after a Twist of Fate
4	Drew Galloway	Eric Young	Pinned with a jackknife pin
5	Jeff Jarrett	Bobby Roode	Pinned after a guitar shot
Winner	Jeff Jarrett	N/A	Jarrett hung the title to win

== See also ==
- 2015 in professional wrestling
