= Brutus Malumba =

Guyanese professional wrestler (1925 – 2015)

Personal information
- Born: Lawrence Liger; September 11, 1921 Georgetown, Guyana
- Died: January 10, 2015 (aged 93)

Professional wrestling career
- Ring name(s): Brutus Malumba; Masked Marvel; Francois Valois; Gene Valois
- Billed height: 6 ft 4 in (1.93 m)
- Billed weight: 264 lb (120 kg)
- Trained by: Bert Assirati
- Debut: 1956
- Retired: 1988

Lawrence Liger (September 11, 1921 – January 10, 2015) was a Guyanese professional wrestler who was best known as Brutus Malumba in Europe, the United Kingdom, Japan and Canada.

== Wrestling career ==
Trained by British wrestler Bert Assirati, Malumba would start his wrestling career in 1956. He would work in Germany and France before making his debut in United Kingdom in 1961.

In 1968, he worked in Japan for International Wrestling Enterprise and in 1969 in the United States in Florida.

In 1972, he worked for the new promotion New Japan Pro Wrestling and later that year made his debut in Canada in Toronto for Maple Leaf Wrestling. During the early to mid 1970s, Malumba worked in Vancouver and Calgary.

In 1976, he returned to New Japan teaming with Tiger Jeet Singh until 1977.

In 1979, Malumba started working for Grand Prix Wrestling based in New Brunswick and Nova Scotia where he became one of the territory's biggest stars. He remained with Grand Prix until his retirement in 1988 at 67 years old.

== Death ==
Malumba died at 93 years old from Alzheimer's disease on January 10, 2015.

== Championships and accomplishments ==
  - Middle Eastern Heavyweight Champion (multiple times between 1963 and 1969)
- Atlantic Grand Prix Wrestling
  - AGPW North American Tag Team Champion (1 time) - with Stephen Petitpas (1 time)
- NWA All-Star Wrestling

- NWA Canadian Tag Team Championship (Vancouver version) (1 time) - with Guy Mitchell
