= Tigre Uno =

Mexican professional wrestler

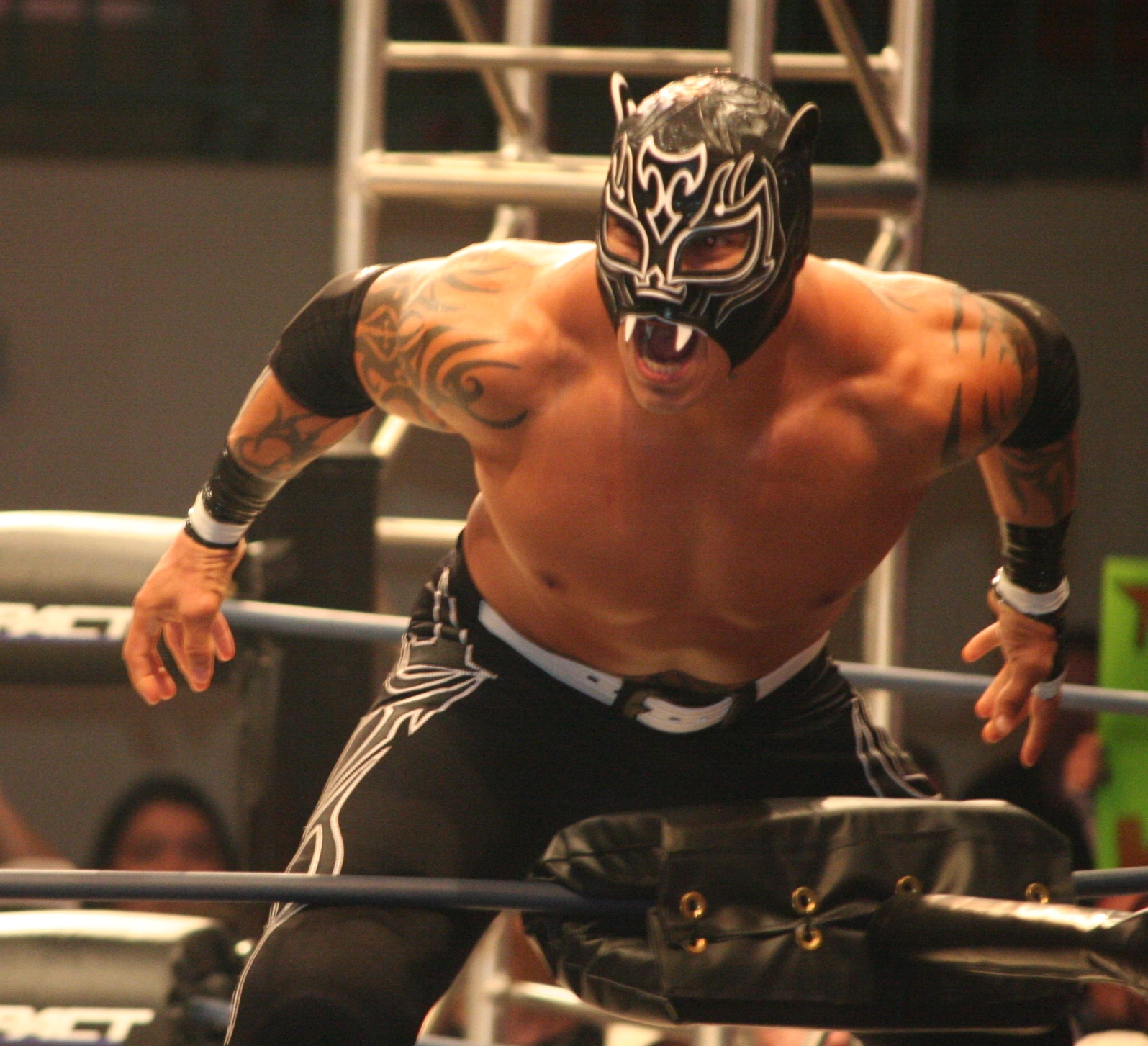
- Tigre Uno in 2015

Personal information
- Born: León Sereno Estrada; April 4, 1981 (age 45) Tijuana, Baja California, Mexico

Professional wrestling career
- Ring name(s): Extreme Tiger; Tyger Mask; Tigre Uno; Ultimate Tiger; Xtreme Tiger
- Billed height: 5 ft 3 in (1.60 m)
- Billed weight: 148 lb (67 kg)
- Billed from: Tijuana, Mexico
- Trained by: Rey Misterio, Sr.
- Debut: September 13, 1998

León Sereno Estrada (born April 4, 1981), better known by his ring name Tigre Uno, is a Mexican professional wrestler. He is currently working in Japanese promotion Pro Wrestling NOAH. He is best known for his time with Total Nonstop Action Wrestling (TNA), where he is a former one-time TNA X Division Champion. Outside of the United States, he is also known for his work in Lucha Libre AAA Worldwide (AAA), where he is a former two-time holder of the AAA Cruiserweight and AAA World Tag Team Championships and the 2011 Rey de Reyes tournament winner as Extreme Tiger.

== Professional wrestling career ==
=== Early career ===
After training under Rey Misterio, Tiger debuted in late 1998 at the age of just 17. Over the years he has wrestled as Tyger Mask, an imitation of the Japanese Tiger Mask character before settling on the name "Extreme Tiger" (sometimes spelled Xtreme Tiger). He first gained notoriety as part of the World Wrestling Association (WWA) in Tijuana, Baja California, which became his "home territory". He also began working for Desastre Total Ultraviolento (DTU) and Nueva Generation Xtrema (NGX), adopting a more hardcore style of wrestling that involved the use of weapons, tables, chair and ladders in the matches.

=== Lucha Libre AAA Worldwide (2006–2012) ===
Through DTU's connection to Lucha Libre AAA Worldwide (AAA) Extreme Tiger began working for the promotion in 2006, working as a rudo (bad guy) who was used in random lower to mid-card matches. After wrestling as a mid-card wrestler throughout the year, he became a técnico (good guy) in 2007. shortly after turning técnico, Tiger won the annual Alas de Oro tournament. Later in the year, he reverted to a rudo as he began teaming with Halloween and Juventud Guerrera as La Familia de Tijuana. On April 27, 2008, Extreme Tiger and Halloween defeated The Mexican Powers (Crazy Boy and Joe Líder) to win the AAA World Tag Team Championship, his first title in AAA. The team held the title for nearly five months, although Halloween did not wrestled for part of that time, before losing the championship to La Hermandad 187 (Joe Líder and Nicho el Millonario) on September 14. After the title loss, Halloween left AAA, ending La Familia de Tijuana. Tiger then participated in the 2008 Alas de Oro, but was unable to win the tournament for the second year in a row as he was eliminated as the second to last competitor, leaving only Jack Evans and 2008 winner Aero Star.

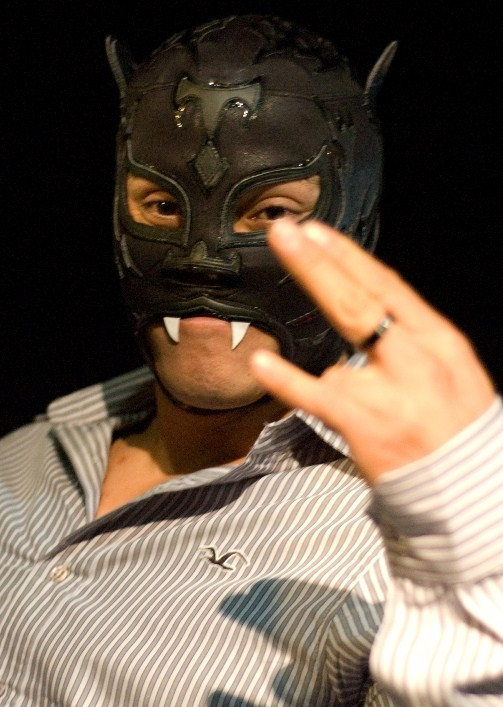
Extreme Tiger greeting his fans

In 2009 Extreme Tiger participated in a tournament to crown the first ever AAA Cruiserweight Champion. Tiger defeated Crazy Boy in the first round of the tournament and Jack Evans in the semi-finals. The finals was a triple threat match that also included Alan Stone and Alex Koslov, which Koslov won to become the first Cruiserweright champion. A few weeks later, at Triplemania XVII, Extreme Tiger won the Cruiserweight Title from Koslov in a multi-competitor match that also included Alan Stone and Crazy Boy. On August 21, 2009, at the 2009 Verano de Escandalo, he lost the title in an elimination match when he was the last man eliminated by Koslov following a low blow. Extreme Tiger lost the title in his first title defense. Following the Verano de Escandalo show then-champion Alex Koslov was fired (in storyline terms) from AAA and the title was vacated. Extreme Tiger was one of five participants selected to wrestle for the vacant title at Heroes Inmortales III. Tiger won his second Cruiserweight Title by winning 5-man ladder match against Sugi San, Jack Evans, Rocky Romero and Teddy Hart. In subsequent months Alex Koslov has returned to AAA as part of La Legión Extranjera and continued to make challenges to Extreme Tiger, who managed to retain the title in all of their matches. On June 6, 2010, at Triplemania XVIII Tiger lost the Cruiserweight Championship to Jack Evans in a four-way elimination match, which also included Nosawa and the man who eliminated him from the match, Christopher Daniels. Tiger's elimination was a direct result of someone coming to the ring wearing an Extreme Tiger mask, then revealing himself to be Rélampago. On March 18, 2011, Extreme Tiger defeated Carlito Caribbean Cool, El Mesías and L.A. Park to become the 2011 Rey de Reyes and earn a guaranteed shot at the AAA Mega Championship. Just three days later Extreme Tiger and Jack Evans defeated Los Maniacos (Silver King and Último Gladiador) to win the AAA World Tag Team Championship. Tiger and Evans made their first successful defense of the title on June 18 at Triplemanía XIX, defeating the TNA team of Abyss and Mr. Anderson in a steel cage match. On October 9 at Héroes Inmortales, Tiger and Evans lost the title to Abyss and Chessman in a Tables, Ladders, and Chairs match. On August 5, 2012, at Triplemanía XX, Tiger reunited with Halloween for one night to take part in a Parejas Suicidas steel cage match, featuring three other former tag teams. However, both Tiger and Halloween managed to escape the cage and avoid having to face each other in a Mask vs. Hair match. The following November, Tiger parted ways with AAA.

=== Pro Wrestling Noah (2010) ===
On October 15, 2010, Tiger made his Pro Wrestling Noah debut entering the Nippon TV Cup Junior Heavyweight Tag League teaming with Jack Evans. They would go on to lose to Atsushi Aoki and KENTA in the semifinals of the tournament.

=== Total Nonstop Action Wrestling ===
==== Various feuds (2013–2014) ====
On December 4, 2013, Tiger, working under the ring name Ultimate Tiger, made his debut for American promotion TNA, losing to Zema Ion in a match taped for TNA Xplosion. On February 25, 2014, it was confirmed that Tiger had signed with TNA and would be debuting under the ring name Tigre Uno at Lockdown on March 9. In his debut, Tigre Uno defeated Manik in a steel cage match. Four days later, Tigre made his Impact Wrestling debut, teaming with Sanada to defeat TNA World Tag Team Champions, The BroMans (Jessie Godderz and Robbie E), in a non-title match. As a result, the two received a shot at the World Tag Team Championship the following week, but were defeated in a three-way match, which also included The Wolves (Davey Richards and Eddie Edwards). Tigre Uno and Sanada were then put against each other in a "best of three" match series for Sanada's TNA X Division Championship. Uno lost the series 1–2, losing the final match on April 27 at Sacrifice. On the May 15 episode of Impact Wrestling, Uno faced Sanada and DJ Zema in a triple threat match for the X Division Championship but failed to win the title. At Slammiversary XII, Uno competed in a ladder match for the X Division Championship but Sanada retained the title.

On the July 10 episode of Impact Wrestling, Uno competed in a battle royal to determine the #1 contender for the TNA World Heavyweight Championship. He was eliminated by Bram. On the July 17 episode of Impact Wrestling, Uno competed in a gauntlet match for the X Division Championship but was eliminated by Crazzy Steve. On July 31 at Destination X, Uno competed in a three-way X Division Championship qualifying match which was won by Samoa Joe. On the August 14 episode of Impact Wrestling, Uno competed in a #1 contender's X Division Elimination Scramble match which was won by Low Ki. From August 23 to 31, Tigre Uno worked a tour with the Japanese Wrestle-1 promotion as a late replacement for an injured Davey Richards. The tour was part of a working relationship between TNA and Wrestle-1. On the August 27 episode of Impact Wrestling, Uno, Low Ki and Crazzy Steve defeated Homicide, DJZ, and Manik in a six-man tag team match. On the September 3 episode of Impact Wrestling, Uno competed in a #1 contender's X Division Elimination Scramble match, which was won by Homicide. Uno would then compete in a four-way match for the vacant X Division Championship on the November 19 episode of Impact Wrestling, which Low Ki won.

==== X Division Champion (2015–2016) ====
On the April 17, 2015 episode of Impact Wrestling, Uno teamed with Jay Rios to participate in a tournament for the vacant World Tag Team Championship, but lost to Ethan Carter III and Bram. Two weeks later, at Hardcore Justice, Uno competed in a four-way ladder match for the TNA X Division Championship , which was won by Kenny King. At Destination X, Uno participated in a tournament for the vacant X Division Championship, defeating DJZ and Mark Andrews in a three-way match. On the June 24 episode of Impact Wrestling, Uno competed in the three-way elimination tournament final, in which he defeated Low Ki and Grado to capture the X Division Championship. Uno's first televised title defense took place at Slammiversary XIII, where he defeated Manik and DJ Z in a three-way elimination match to retain the title. At Bound for Glory, Uno defeated Manik, DJ Z and Andrew Everett in an Ultimate X match to retain the X Division Championship.

During October and November (taped in July 2015), Uno participated in the TNA World Title Series tournament as part of the Group X Division. He lost to DJZ but managed to defeat Mandrews, leading to him facing DJZ and Manik in a three-way reverse elimination. DJZ first won thus qualifying for the Round of 16, and then Uno pinned Manik to advance to the Round of 16, where he defeated the Knockouts Champion Gail Kim to advance the round of eight where he was defeated by Eric Young. At One Night Only: Live!, Uno defeated DJ Z, Mandrews and Crazzy Steve in a Four-Way elimination match to retain the X Division Championship. on the January 26, 2016 episode of Impact Wrestling, Uno defeated DJ Z and Mandrews to retain the title.

On the February 2, 2016 episode of Impact Wrestling, Uno lost the X Division Championship to Trevor Lee. Uno received a rematch for the title on the February 9 episode of Impact Wrestling but failed to win the title. Uno would then challenge Lee for the title again in a Six Sides of Steel match at Lockdown, but lost again. Uno would then wrestle his last match in TNA on the March 19 episode of Xplosion, in which he lost to Jessie Godderz. On December 12, Uno announced his departure from TNA.

=== Independent circuit (2016–present) ===
In April 2016, Tigre Uno participated in a tour of the United Kingdom for Southside Wrestling Entertainment (SWE).

In early 2026, Extreme Tiger began a rivalry with El Hijo de Rey Misterio in The Crash Lucha Libre, culminating in a mask vs. mask Lucha de Apuestas ("bet match") at The Crash 15th Anniversary Show on November 6, 2026. Tiger lost the match and was thus forced to unmask, revealing his identity, León Sereno Estrada, to the public.

=== Return to Pro Wrestling Noah (2022–present) ===
On April 29, 2022, Tiger made his return to Pro Wrestling Noah defeating Seiki Yoshioka.

On May 21, 2022, Tiger unsuccessfully challenged Hayata for the GHC Junior Heavyweight Championship at Noah Dream On 2022 Final.

== Championships and accomplishments ==
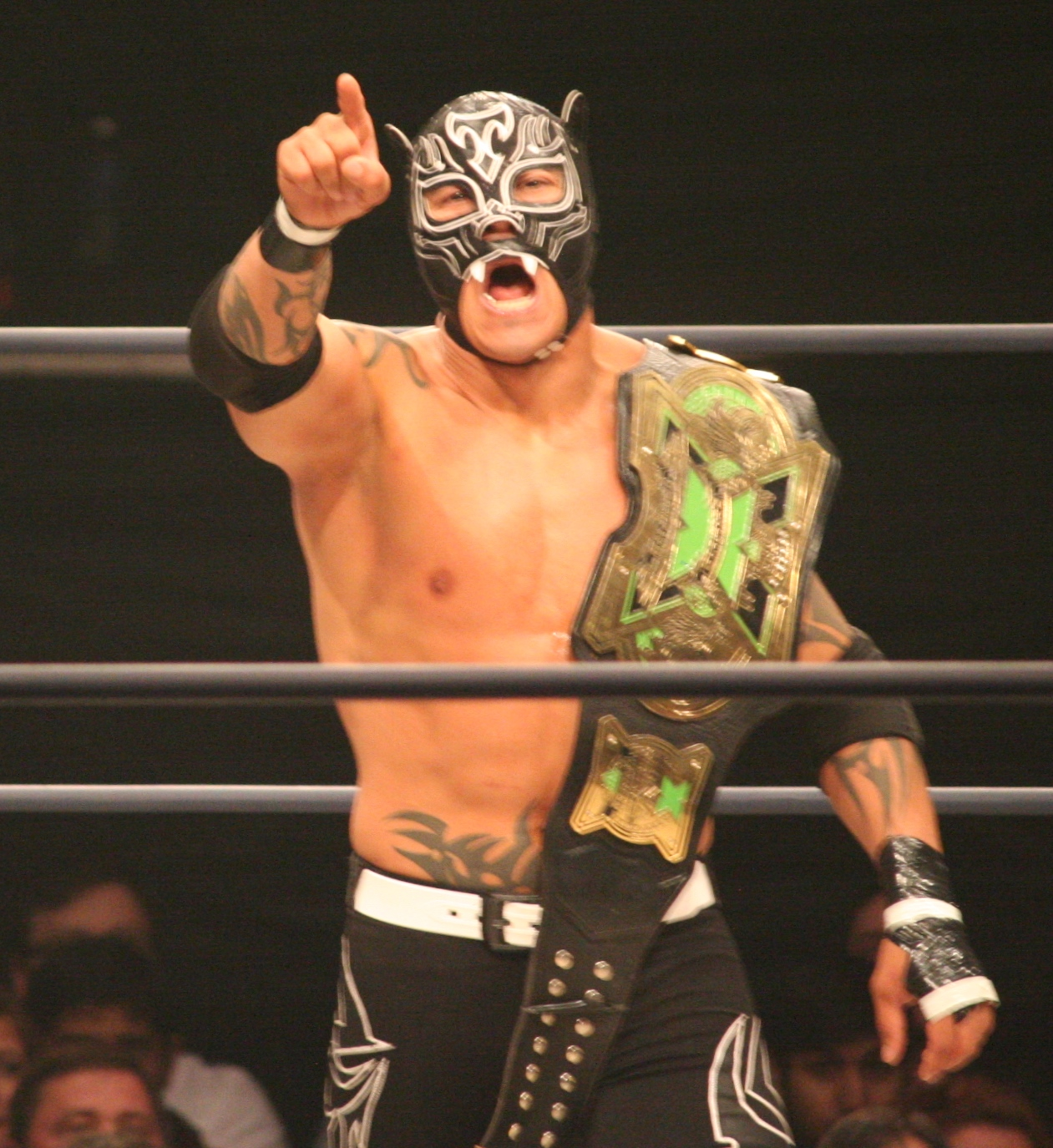
Tigre Uno is a one-time TNA X Division Champion

- Lucha Libre AAA Worldwide
  - AAA Cruiserweight Championship (2 times)
  - AAA World Tag Team Championship (2 times) – with Halloween (1) and Jack Evans (1)
  - Alas de Oro (2007)
  - Copa Abismo Negro (2009)
  - Copa Gladiator (2010)
  - Rey de Reyes (2011)
- Lucha Libre Voz
  - Voz Ultra Championship (1 time)
- Nuevo Generation Extrema
  - NGX Extreme Championship (2 times)
  - NGX King of Deathmatch (2003)
- Pro Wrestling Illustrated
  - Ranked #126 of the top 500 singles wrestlers in the PWI 500 in 2016
- Total Nonstop Action Wrestling
  - TNA X Division Championship (1 time)
  - TNA X Division Championship Tournament (2015)
  - Global Impact Tournament (2015) – with Team International (The Great Sanada, Drew Galloway, The Great Muta, Magnus, Bram, Rockstar Spud, Khoya, Sonjay Dutt and Angelina Love)
- Vendetta Pro Wrestling
  - Vendetty Award: 2014 Match of the Year with Little Cholo & Bestia 666
- Other titles
  - Baja California Lightweight Championship (1 time)

== Luchas de Apuestas record ==
Winner (wager)	Loser (wager)	Location	Event	Date	Notes
Extreme Tiger (mask)	Venum Black (hair)	Tijuana, Baja California	Live event	September 4, 2004	
Extreme Tiger (mask)	Joe Líder (hair)	Tijuana, Baja California	Live event	November 2, 2004	
El Hijo de Rey Misterio (mask)	Extreme Tiger (mask)	Tijuana, Baja California	The Crash 15th Anniversary Show	November 6, 2026	

== Personal life ==
Tigre Uno is both married and has children. He currently lives in Tijuana on the state of Baja California.
