= Nyamgavaa Ichinkhorloo =

Mongolian theater artist (born 1950)

- Ichinkhorloo in Chicago
- Born: September 18, 1950 (age 76); Huvsgul province, Mongolia
- Education: Russian Academy of Theatre Arts - GITIS
- Occupations: Theater artist, writer, film director and film producer
- Years active: 1973 - present
- Spouse: Dolgor Nanzad (m.1990)
- Children: 5
- Awards: Honored Artist of Mongolia (see below)

Nyamgavaa Ichinkhorloo (born September 18, 1950) is a Mongolian theater artist, writer, film director, and film producer. He is president of Mongolian National Academy of Art and was named an Honored Artist of Mongolia for his contributions to film and theater in 2013 by the Mongolian President Tsakhiagiin Elbegdorj (Mongolian: Цахиагийн Элбэгдорж). He studied directing at the Russian Academy of Theatre Arts in Moscow and began his career in 1973 at the Youth and Children's Theater in Ulaanbaatar.

== Early life ==
Nyamgavaa Ichinkhorloo was born on September 18, 1950, in Khuvsgul province, Mongolia to two teachers, Ichinkhorloo Jamyan and Yanjinsuren Mijid. He was the first of the couple's eight children. His father, Ichinkhorloo taught history and geography; his mother Yanjinsuren taught Mongolian language and literature. Nyamgavaa credits his parents with instilling in him a great respect for education and a love for language and story. He notes that, by the Mongolian lunar calendar, the moment he was born was the Tiger year, the Tiger day, and the Tiger hour; this is traditionally thought to be very auspicious. Mongolian tradition is that “triple tigers” are very brave, competent, and unpredictable. Khulan Tsoodol, a famous Mongolian poet, spoke to these qualities as they manifest in Nyamgavaa: “ To make a metaphor, Nyamgavaa is an artist like an erupting volcano. …He is always restless, burning from inside and finding his ideas in his passion and sufferings.”

He completed secondary school in 1965, two years after his father's death. He had begun working while still in school to help support his family. After graduation, when he was fifteen years old, he began acting in Mongolia's Youth and Children's Theater in Ulaanbaatar (Mongolian: Улаанбаатар) Between 1965 and 1969, he acted in over 10 productions, including playing Mercutio in Romeo and Juliet.

== Education in Moscow (1969-1974) ==
In 1969, Nyamgavaa received a scholarship from the Mongolian government to study directing at the Russian Academy of Theatre Arts - GITIS, in Moscow, Russia. He studied with Andrey Goncharov, famed Russian theater director and writer. He graduated in 1974 and returned to Mongolia.

Nyamgavaa's professor Goncharov believed he saw the influence of playwright, and poet Bertolt Brecht on Nyamgavaa's work, even though Nyamgavaa himself had no idea who Brecht was at that time. Goncharov admired Nyamgavaa's direction of Alexander Pushkin’s play Mozart & Salieri (Russian: «Моцарт и Сальери) at GITIS. After this project Goncharov told Nyamgavaa, " I thought you were like Stanislavsky, but I can feel the style of Brecht in your work as well.” Goncharov recognized Nyamgavaa’s interest in making the theater a place for intellectual engagement and not just storytelling or melodrama. Another affinity with Brecht was the blending of eastern and western styles and ideas. Much later, this same tendency to connect cultures would be admired by Bundan Boldsaikhan (Mongolian: Бунданы Болдсайхан), honored doctor of Mongolia: “He has two horses, from the Eastern and Western worlds.” Goncharov continued to appreciate Nyamgavaa's work even after the latter left the university. Andrei Borisov, famed Russian director, recalls: “During my studies, our teacher Goncharov often praised a former student named Nyamgavaa on his creative skills and talent. Nyamgavaa’s skills to deliver his art in a unique style through his creative imagination had not been forgotten by his teacher Goncharov. Ever since his student days his vision and talent shone through his passion, time after time, with unpredictable twists to his storytelling.” Borisov and Nyamgavaa would later work together on the film By the Will of Chingis Khan.

== Theater Directing Career in Mongolia (1973-2006) ==
In 1973, while still a student at GITIS, Nyamgavaa returned to the Youth and Children's Theater in Ulaanbaatar, Mongolia, where he had acted from 1965 to 1969. He wanted to direct Soviet novelist, playwright, and journalist Vera Panova’s Vstuplenie (based on the story "Valia and Volodia”, Mongolian: (Гэнэн залуу нас) as his first project, which would also be part of his GITIS thesis, as a director at the theater. The modernist style was threatening to the Mongolian government because it was seen to reject the communist system and traditional culture. It led at first to the cancellation of the play. Ultimately, he chose to make the changes suggested by the government to enable him to reopen the play. After the changes, the production blended Mongolian tradition styles with modernism, still satisfying the censors. He also adapted the novel Five Fingers of One Hand (Mongolian: "Гарын Таван хуруу ) by famed Mongolian writer Chadraabal Lodoidamba (Mongolian: Чадраабалын Лодойдамба) into a play which he directed for Youth and Children's Theater, also as part of his GITIS thesis in 1974.

In 1974, Nyamgavaa graduated and returned to Mongolia. The Mongolian government was suspicious about his loyalty because of the trouble surrounding his production of Vstuplenie. He was assigned to work in the countryside, away from the capital city of Ulaanbaatar, as punishment. He began work as a director at Zaluuchuud Theater in Darkhan, Mongolia. The theater was small, with only 19 employees, but Nyamgavaa would build it into a beloved institution with far-reaching influence over the next decade. He directed and produced over one hundred production and oversaw the construction of a new theater building for the group. His work began to be noticed throughout the country, and the theater became very popular and successful, eventually employing over 200 artists and other workers.

In 1985, Nyamgavaa returned to Ulaanbaatar and became the artistic director of the Youth and Children's Theater, where he stayed until 2006. He began choosing works by Mongolian playwrights who were questioning communist ideology. They were so popular that the communist government was reticent to interfere in their production. He produced or directed over fifty plays, including many by top Mongolian playwrights. Notable were his productions of Love for Love (Mongolian: Хайрыг хайрла жүжиг) by Darmaa Batbayar (Mongolian: Дармын Батбаяр), Princess (Mongolian: Эрх гүнж) by Dorj Garmaa (Mongolian: Доржийн Гармаа), and works by journalist and playwright Tserendorjiin Baldorj (Mongolian: Ц.Балдорж сэтгүүлчийн): Raven (Kheree, Mongolian: Хэрээ) and The Wicked Women (Mongolian: Эмсүүд). Famous Mongolian actress Oidovjamts Enkhtuul (Mongolian: Ойдовжамцын Энхтуул) looked back on her role in Raven: “I had so many good roles, but the character in this play was my favorite.” Baldorj credited Nyamgavaa for his career in the arts: “It was Nyamgavaa who brought me into the world of drama and cinema. I was thrilled by his world and admired him so much that I bowed down to him.” Nyamgavaa also introduced many western plays to Mongolian audiences. Among the most notable were The Blind by Maurice Maeterlinck, and Talent and Admirers by Alexander Ostrovsky.

Nyamgavaa's return to the Youth and Children's Theater was during a transition in Mongolian culture from communism to democracy, inspired by the Russian Perestroika. Because of his willingness to resist government criticism and censorship, Nyamgavaa was very popular with and inspiring to his fellow artists and those who would head the 1990 revolution. Gombo Zoljargal (Mongolian: (Гомбын Золжаргал ) of the Mongolian National Broadcast, credits Nyamgavaa's direction of Tserendorjiin Baldorj's plays Raven (Kheree, Mongolian: Хэрээ) and The Wicked Women (Mongolian: Эмсүүд) at the Youth and Children's Theatre in the mid-80s with being a wake-up call for the young generation, who began to demand change and support democracy. These two plays were extremely popular, tapping into the desire of Mongolia's youth for a new way of life. So, although democracy did not come to Mongolia until years after the production of these plays, Nyamgavaa and Baldorj's work was inspiring the future leaders of the bloodless 1990 Democratic Revolution (Mongolian: Ардчилсан хувьсгал, Ardchilsan Khuvĭsgal).

He was able to take the Youth and Children's Theatre into the first privately owned theater in Mongolia. He served as its director and owner until 2006 after abandoning hundreds of actors and theatre staff with taxation documentation. Due to his unfair privatization of the theatre, negative attitude among peers and unpaid state-backed education loans for his daughters, he is widely seen negatively in the Mongolian public.

== Filmmaking Career (1982-current) ==
Nyamgavaa began his career in filmmaking in 1982 with Five Fingers of One Hand (Mongolian: Гарын таван хуруу), which he wrote and directed based on the play he had adapted from Chadraabal Lodoidamba's work for the Youth and Children's Theater. It was featured in the Moscow International Film Festival. The next year he wrote the screenplay for I Love You (Mongolian: Би чамд хайртай). In the late 1980s, he wrote two films, I Love to Fly (1987; Mongolian: Би нисэх дуртай) and The Best Treasure (1989; Mongolian: Нандин эрдэнэ), which he also directed. He also directed After Telling Story (1987; Mongolian: Үлгэр дууссан хойно).

In the early 1990s, he became better known to western filmgoers and began his career as a producer with The Running Antelope (1993; Mongolian: Цахилж яваа гөрөөс). That film, which he also directed, was featured in both the Fukuoka International Film Festival in 1993 and the Berlin International Film Festival in 1994. He next directed and produced Boi (1994; Mongolian: Бой), which was featured in the Festival of the Three Continents in Nantes, France in 1995. Rolan Bykov, Russian director and screenwriter, wrote that he was “completely shocked” by the film, which was the only Mongolian film of the time to criticize Russia. Nyamgavaa also produced and directed the film Slaughter (1995; Mongolian: Байлдан дагуулагч) during this period.

In the late 1990s, two films Nyamgavaa directed and produced won the best film in the Goo Maral awards (Mongolia's top film prize): My Native Land (1998; Mongolian: Газар шороо мину зэ) and Ferocious Saint Lord of Gobi (1998; Mongolian: Догшин хутагтын сахиус). This latter film made history as the first Mongolian Film screened in the United States, screening in 2000 at the Seattle International Film Festival and the Mongolia Now: Independent Voices film festival at the American Museum of Natural History in New York City.

In 2009, Nyamgavaa produced By the Will of Chingis Khan (Mongolian: Чингис хааны захиас) with his son Bilegt Nyamgavaa (Vladimir Davidovich Ivanov) and oldest daughter Sarnai Nyamgavaa Tessitore. It screened at the Cannes Film Festival and the Montreal World Film Festival. It was Mongolia's official submission for Best Foreign Language Film at the Academy Awards. In the same year he was a producer on the Japanese-Mongolian co-production Genghis Khan: To the Ends of the Earth and Sea.

In 2012, he directed 19, which won the Mongolian Academy Award for best short film. In 2014, he directed Unlimited (Mongolian: Хязгааргүй), a story of a journalist whose investigations lead to his imprisonment by the government. He is currently working with Damdin Jamiyan (Mongolian: Дамдины Жамьян ) and Sean Chichelli on the script for a new project he will direct titled Blue Horse.

== Publications ==
Nyamgavaa published two books. One, Odd Number (Sondgoi Too, Mongolian: Сондгой тоо) he adapted into the screenplay for I Love You. The other, Tears (Nulims, Mongolian: Нулимс) was a collection of short stories. In 2017, he wrote Movie Scenario (Mongolian: Кино зохиолуудbook) with co-writer Damdin Jamiyan, which collected three screenplays: Holy Chingis Khan, Wolf’s Ankle Bone, and Queen Khulan. The book includes text in Mongolian script, Mongolian Cyrillic, Russian, and English. It won the Golden Feather Award, the national literary award in Mongolia, for play and film script for 2017.

== Influence ==
Nyamgavaa has been credited by his peers with transforming Mongolian theater into an important cultural influence. Director and honored artist of Mongolia Chimeddorj Gankhuyag (Mongolian: Чимэддорж Ганхуяг), asserts, “There is no room left for another reform in Mongolian theatre. All innovations and reform were done by Nyamgavaa in satire, musicals, psychological drama…. everything.” Award-winning journalist Bat-Erdene Batbayar also sees Nyamgavaa as radically changing Mongolian cultural life: “It’s Nyamgavaa who first brought Modernism into the Mongolian performing arts world.” Sanjaagiin Bayar, former prime minister of Mongolia, sees Nyamgavaa's influence as political as well as artistic: “Nyamgavaa has Pan-Mongolist ideas. He called out two influential neighbors [China and Russia] with his films My Native Land and Boi. People who fight for their land are always ready to take a risk.”

== Personal life ==
While he was studying in Moscow, between 1969 and 1974, Nyamgavaa was in a relationship with Ivanova Domna, a fellow student of Yakut heritage and actress. They had a son together in 1972, Vladimir Davidovich Ivanov (Mongolian name: Bilegt Nyamgavaa). Ivanov is a famous kickboxing master and coach and a successful producer in Russia.

In 1974, Nyamgavaa married dancer Battsengel Choijinnyam. They divorced in 1990. The couple has two children: Sarnai Nyamgavaa Tessitore, a producer in Chicago, and Aleona Nyamgavaa Sencion, a psychologist in New York.

In 1990, he married Dolgor Nanzad (Mongolian: Нанзадын Долгор), an award-winning Mongolian actress. She worked on several important plays directed by Nyamgavaa, including Raven, The Wicked Women, and Love for Love. She also acted in two films with which Nyamgavaa was involved: I Love to Fly, which he wrote, and Ferocious Saint Lord of Gobi, which he directed. They moved to the United States in 2009, settling in Chicago. The couple has two children: Maral Nyamgavaa, who studied to be a beauty specialist and Michid Nyamgavaa, who studied business.

== Filmography ==
Year	Title	Credited as			Notes
Year	Title	Director	Writer	Producer	Notes
1982	Five Fingers of One Hand (Гарын таван хуруу)	Yes	Yes		Awarded a special diploma at the Moscow International Film Festival, 1983
1983	I Love You (Би чамд хайртай)		Yes		Awarded “best artistic work” from the Mongolian Ministry of Education and Science (Mongolian: монгол улсын соёлын яам), 1986 Screened at Karlovy Vary International Film Festival, 1986
1987	After Telling Story (Үлгэр дууссан хойно)	Yes			Screened at Cinemania World Film Panorama, Bulgaria, 1987
1987	I Love to Fly (Би нисэх дуртай)		Yes		
1989	The Best Treasure (Нандин эрдэнэ)	Yes	Yes		Screened at Golden Rose Bulgarian Feature Film Festival, 1990
1993	The Running Antelope (Цахилж яваа гөрөөс)	Yes		Yes	Fukuoka International Film Festival, 1993 Berlin International Film Festival, 1994
1994	Boi (Бой)	Yes		Yes	Festival of the Three Continents, 1995
1995	Slaughter (Байлдан дагуулагч)	Yes		Yes	Awarded “Best Artistic Work of the Year” from The Federation of Mongolian Art, 1995
1998	My Native Land (Газар шороо мину зэ)	Yes		Yes	Awarded the Goo Maral, the Mongolian state prize for best film.
1998	Ferocious Saint Lord of Gobi (Догшин хутагтын сахиу)	Yes		Yes	Screened at Joint Asian Film Festival, 1998 Selected elected for "Focus on Asia: Best Selections 1991 - 2000 Screened at Seattle International Film Festival, 2000 Selected as part of Mongolia Now: Independent Voices film festival at the American Museum of Natural History, New York City, 2000 Goo Maral, best film, 1998
2007	Genghis Khan: To the Ends of the Earth and Sea (Чингис хаан)			Yes	Joint production of Japanese and Mongolian production companies
2009	By the Will of Chingis Khan (Чингис хааны захиас)			Yes	Screened at the Cannes Film Festival, 2009 Screened at the Montreal World Film Festival, 2009
2012	19	Yes			Mongolian Academy Award for best short film, 2013
2014	Unlimited (Хязгааргүй)	Yes			
