= Amka and the Three Golden Rules =

- Film poster
- Directed by: Babar Ahmed
- Written by: Babar Ahmed
- Starring: Hureltogoo Chuluunbaatar, Batmunk Khulangoo, Dashnyam Maralgua
- Music by: Kenneth Lampl; Steve Grove
- Release date: 22 March 2014
- Running time: 86 minutes
- Country: Mongolia
- Language: Mongolian

Amka and The Three Golden Rules is a 2014 Mongolian-American family comedy/drama written and directed by Babar Ahmed. According to the YouTube channel MisterCinema, the film is ranked as the #1 movie of all time from Mongolia.

The film was highlighted in the World Development Report 2017 as an example of how policy making is a "result of a bargaining process among actors, who frequently have diverse and even opposing preferences and interests."

== Plot ==
Amka is a ten year old Mongolian boy. His biggest dream is to play soccer with the neighborhood kids but they only make fun of his poor clothes. One day Amka discovers a gold coin. With this new found wealth he buys fancy clothes and now the other kids let him play soccer with them. He is soon introduced to video games and he starts to get addicted. Amka's taste for money starts to take over his personality. He loses respect for his family and starts borrowing money from the other kids. Very soon he is over his head in debt. The neighborhood kids have had enough and chase Amka to get their money back. Amka escapes to the countryside where he meets his eccentric uncle. The uncle teaches Amka three golden rules in life.

== Release ==
Amka and the Three Golden Rules is currently playing on international flights on American Airlines.

On Emirates Airlines "Amka and The Three Golden Rules" is one of four movies described as 'Great movies worth watching from around the world'.

The film was screened at the Cleveland International Film Festival, New York Indian Film Festival, Boston International Kid Festival, Fort Lauderdale International Film Festival, and SCHLINGEL International Film Festival. It was the first Mongolian film to be screened at the WorldFest-Houston International Film Festival.

At the Arizona International Film Festival, the movie received a special award for "Bridging Cultures".

== Reception ==
Laura DeMarco of The Plain Dealer gave the film an "A" rating, calling the film "poignant" and praising Genzorig Telmen's performance. John DeSando of WCBE praised the film's realism and called the film an "affecting Mongolian tale...about the enduring values". Diane Clark of The Village Voice called it "curiously uncomfortable to watch" and its "sentimentality is like wind rushing in."

The UB Post highlighted the allegory in the story to Mongolia's current predicament of facing modernization and its discovery of natural resources. The newspaper wrote that the movie is 'Brilliantly crafted' and went on to say that 'combined with a strong lead, stunning shots of the spectacular landscapes of Mongolia and excellent music... the story is in many ways a symbol of how Mongolia must decide its own fate'.
