= Gail Kim =

Canadian-American professional wrestler (born 1977)

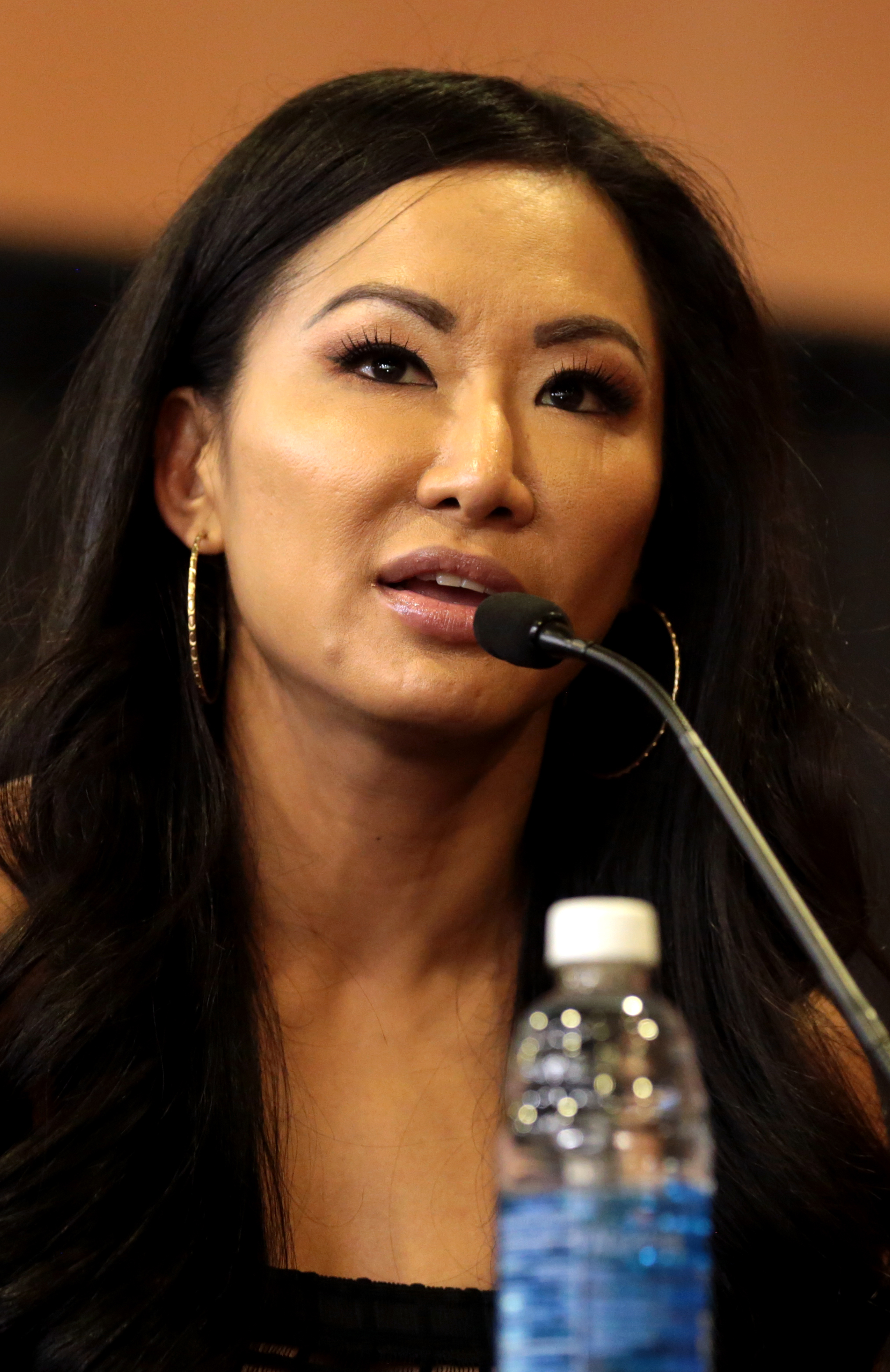
- Kim in 2017

Personal information
- Born: February 20, 1977 (age 49) Toronto, Ontario, Canada
- Education: Ryerson University
- Spouse: Robert Irvine (m. 2012)

Professional wrestling career
- Ring name(s): Gail Kim; La Felina
- Billed height: 5 ft 4 in (1.63 m)
- Billed weight: 121 lb (55 kg)
- Billed from: Tampa, Florida; Toronto, Ontario, Canada; Korea
- Trained by: Ron Hutchison; Rob Etcheverria; Dave Finlay
- Debut: December 2000
- Retired: April 28, 2019

Gail Kim-Irvine (born February 20, 1977) is a Canadian-American retired professional wrestler. She is best known for her tenures in TNA Wrestling and World Wrestling Entertainment (WWE). In TNA, she was the inaugural and record setting seven-time Knockouts Champion and she also was a one-time Knockouts Tag Team Champion with Madison Rayne. In WWE, she won the WWE Women's Championship in her first match.

Kim began her career wrestling on the Canadian-American independent circuit, before joining WWE in 2002. She became the first WWE Diva in history to win a championship in her debut match. After being released by WWE in 2004, Kim joined TNA in September 2005. There, she joined the tag team America's Most Wanted as their valet. After the dissolution of the group, Kim performed as a singles wrestler, eventually becoming the inaugural TNA Knockouts Champion in October 2007. During her time in TNA, she had an acclaimed feud with Awesome Kong, which is generally considered one of the greatest women's wrestling feuds of the 2000s.

She later left TNA in August 2008, to return to WWE three months later, where she remained until 2011. The following October she returned to TNA, where she was until 2025. In 2012, Pro Wrestling Illustrated named Kim the number one female wrestler in the world and in 2016 she was the first female to be inducted into the TNA Wrestling Hall of Fame.

== Early life ==
Kim was born on February 20, 1977 in Toronto, in Ontario, Canada to Korean immigrants. She attended York Memorial Collegiate Institute in York district. Kim then attended the University of Toronto majoring in kinesiology, before transferring to Ryerson University in the Garden District and changing her major to nutrition.

== Professional wrestling career ==
=== Early career (2000–2002) ===
After obtaining her degree from Ryerson University, Kim decided to become a professional wrestler and joined Ron Hutchison's School of Pro Wrestling in Toronto. She received supplementary training from Rob Etchevarria at the Squared Circle Pro Wrestling Gym. She debuted in December 2000, wearing a mask and wrestling as "The Queen of the Cats" La Felina in the Southern Ontario-based Apocalypse Wrestling Federation. She, however, was eventually unmasked by Tracy Brooks in a "Mask versus Hair" match. Kim worked on the Canadian independent circuit for two years, wrestling for promotions such as Border City Wrestling.

=== World Wrestling Entertainment (2002–2004) ===
Kim was introduced to World Wrestling Federation (WWF) employee Nora Greenwald (known on-screen as Molly Holly) by Jason Sensation in 2001; Greenwald encouraged Kim to send her videos and tapes to WWF officials. In October 2002, she was hired by the WWF, now renamed World Wrestling Entertainment (WWE). She spent eight months training in their then-developmental territory Ohio Valley Wrestling (OVW) and wrestled house shows and dark matches before being called up to their main roster. After several weeks of vignettes showcasing Matrix-like effects aired on Raw, Kim debuted on June 30 as a fan favorite, with a Matrix-inspired outfit.

Her first televised WWE match was a seven-woman battle royal on the June 30, 2003, episode of Raw with the WWE Women's Championship, then held by an injured Jazz, on the line. Kim won the match by lastly eliminating Victoria. Kim held the title for four weeks, successfully defending it once against Molly Holly, before losing it to Holly on the July 28 episode of Raw. The following week, Kim turned heel on Trish Stratus, which stemmed from a previous Raw episode where Stratus cost Kim and herself a tag match against Victoria and Holly; Kim subsequently formed an alliance with Holly to take on Stratus, defeating her and various partners on several occasions, until Stratus was later assisted by Lita. At WWE's Unforgiven pay-per-view event on September 21, Stratus and Lita defeated Kim and Holly in a tag team match. The four women continued to feud until November, when Kim was sidelined with a broken right collarbone.

Kim returned to Raw in April 2004 and immediately reforged her alliance with Holly. In May 2004, Kim submitted then-Women's Champion Victoria twice, in singles match and a six-woman tag match, earning herself a title shot at Bad Blood. However, Lita pinned Kim on the June 7 episode of Raw, and Lita and Trish Stratus were added to the championship match. At Bad Blood on June 13, she faced Lita, Stratus, and Victoria in a Fatal Four-Way match for the WWE Women's Championship, which was won by Stratus.

Kim participated in a battle royal on October 19 at Taboo Tuesday, which was won by Stratus. Kim, however, was released by WWE on November 3, 2004, as a result of cost cutting. Kim was caught off guard by her release and was told that management wanted to take the women's division in a new direction.

=== Independent Circuit (2005) ===
After her release from WWE, Kim made an appearance for Mid-Atlantic Championship Wrestling on January 22, 2005, in South Korea, teaming with Lollipop in a tag team match, where they defeated Malia Hosaka and Nidia. On June 26, Kim made her debut for World Series Wrestling (WSW) in Melbourne, Australia, losing to Nidia in a singles match. Two days later at another WSW event in Sydney, Kim defeated Nidia in a rematch. The following night, Kim teamed up with A.J. Styles to defeat Nidia and Christopher Daniels in a mixed tag team match.

=== Total Nonstop Action Wrestling ===
==== America's Most Wanted (2005–2007) ====
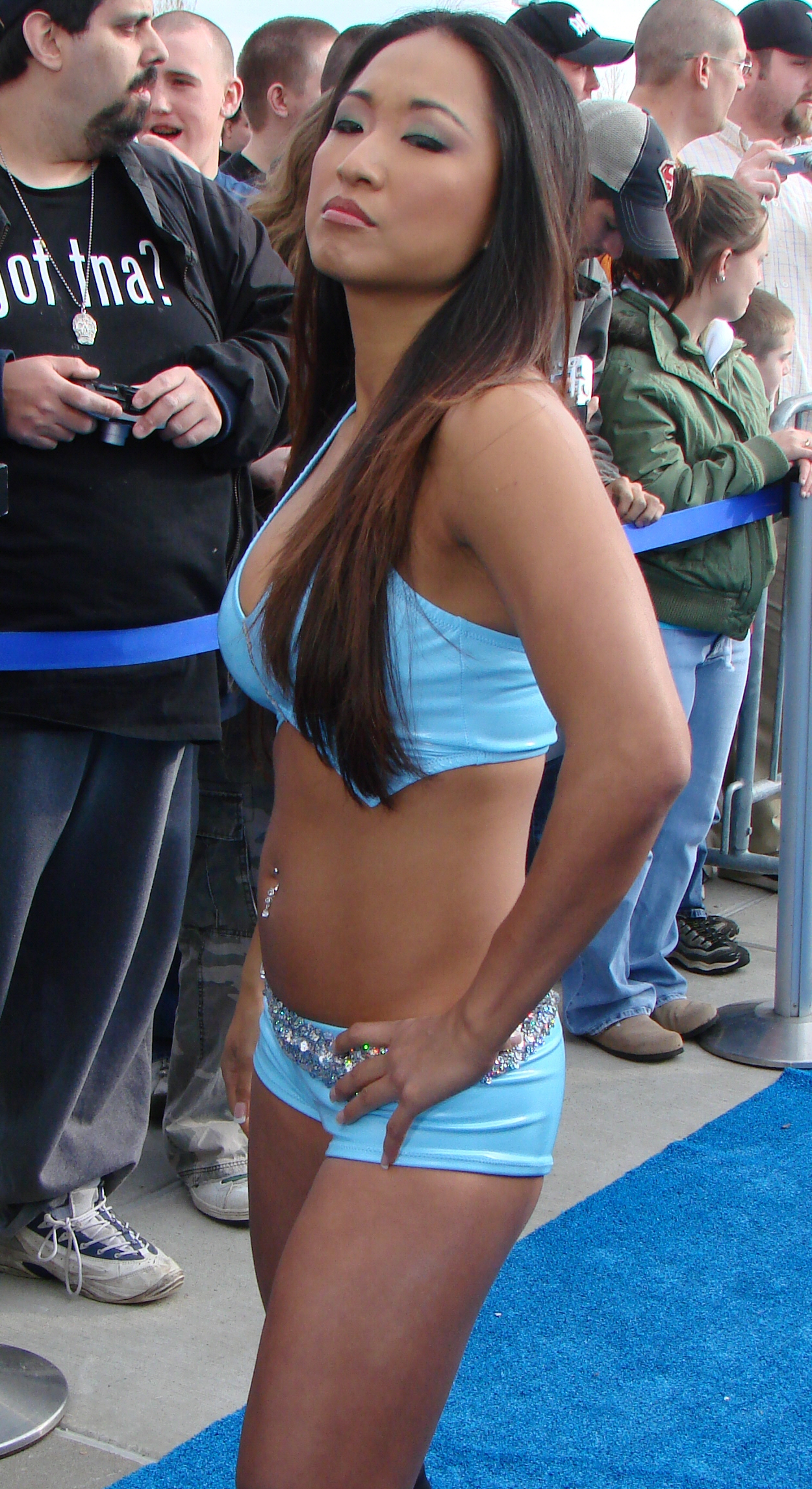
Kim in 2007

Following her release from WWE and the expiration of her 90-day no-compete clause, Kim made sporadic appearances on the independent circuit, including at Michigan's All World Wrestling League and in Japan. She also competed in Korea and Mexico before being signed by Total Nonstop Action Wrestling (TNA) on September 6, 2005. She made her TNA debut on the October 8, 2005, episode of TNA Impact!, aligning herself with Jeff Jarrett and America's Most Wanted (AMW) (Chris Harris and James Storm) and taking on the role of AMW's and Jarrett's manager, and regularly got physically involved in the wrestlers' matches. Kim made her in-ring debut on July 16, 2006, at TNA's Victory Road pay-per-view in a Six Man Mixed Tag Team match with AMW against A.J. Styles, Christopher Daniels, and Sirelda. However, her team ended up on the losing end of the contest. At Hard Justice on August 13, Kim defeated Sirelda in a singles match.

In early 2007, after the dissolution of AMW, Kim continued to manage Storm until Final Resolution where he turned on her and replace her with a returning Jacqueline, turning Kim face. The first encounter between the group was on February 11 at Against All Odds in a mixed tag team match, which Kim and her partner, Petey Williams, lost. On March 11 at Destination X, Storm and Jacqueline won a rematch against Kim and Williams in a Double Bullrope match. Kim went on to defeat Jacqueline in a Six Sides of Steel cage match on April 15 at Lockdown. Their feud came to an end on the May 3 episode of TNA Impact!, when Kim defeated Jacqueline under street fight rules.

==== Singles competition (2007–2008) ====
After the conclusion to her feud with Jacqueline, Kim made two minor pay-per-view appearances in a short feud against Robert Roode, before outlasting nine other competitors in a ten-woman gauntlet match to become the inaugural TNA Women's Knockout Champion on October 14, 2007, at Bound for Glory. She made her first title defense on November 11 at Genesis, where she retained the renamed TNA Women's Knockout Championship by defeating Roxxi Laveaux, ODB, and Angel Williams. Kim then began a feud with Awesome Kong over the championship. Their first encounter occurred on December 2 at Turning Point, which resulted in Kim retaining the title due to a disqualification by Kong. On January 6, 2008, at Final Resolution, Kim defeated Kong in an acclaimed second encounter to retain the championship under no disqualification rules. In their third and final encounter in the main event of the January 10 episode of TNA Impact!, Kong defeated Kim to win the TNA Women's Knockout Championship, however also suffering a concussion at the hands of Kong after being powerbombed in the ring three times.

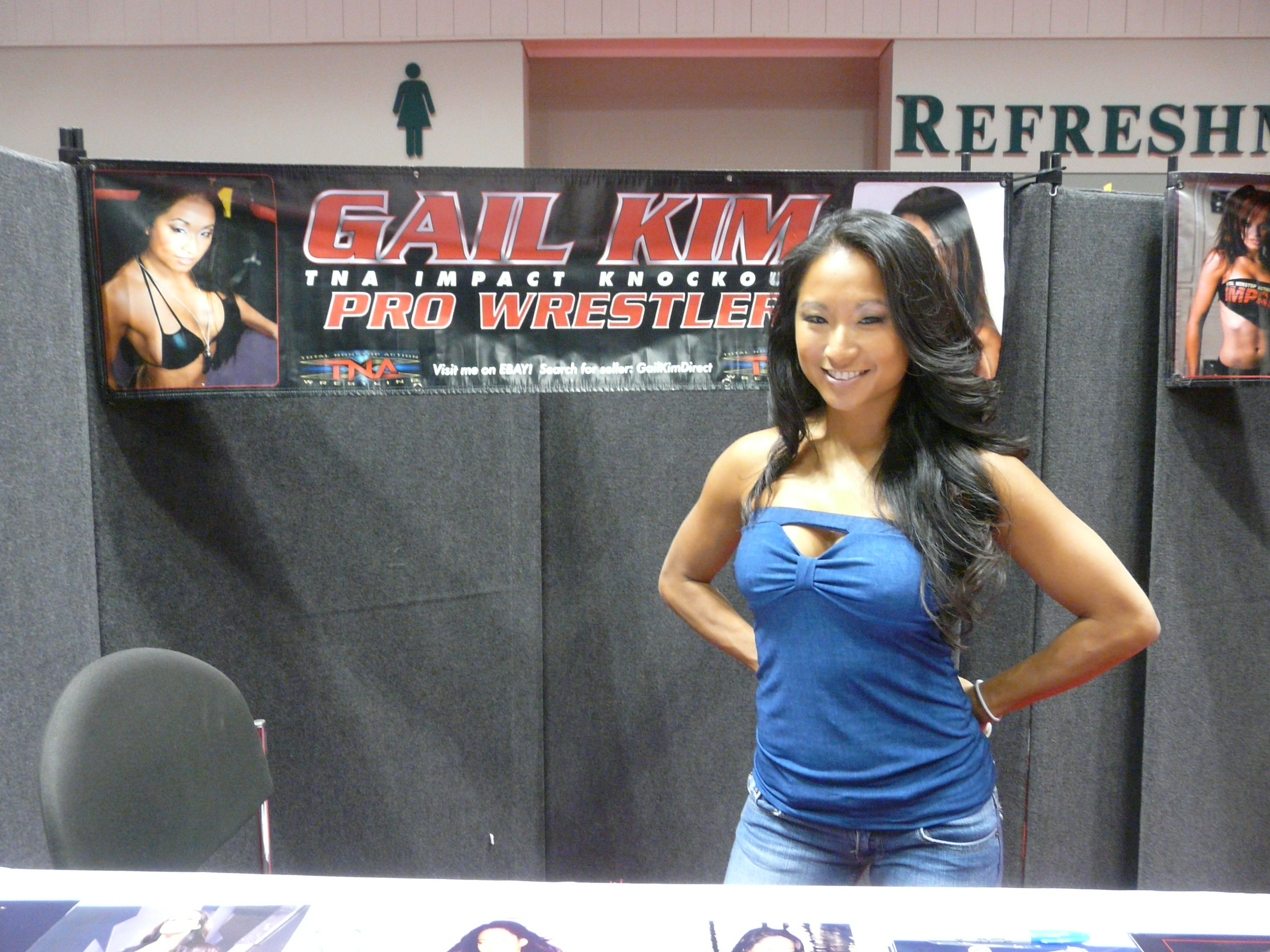
Kim at an autograph signing in Indianapolis, Indiana, in 2008

During the January 24 episode of TNA Impact!, Kim was awarded the 2007 TNA Knockout of the Year award. Kim competed in a three-way match on March 9 at Destination X against Kong and ODB, which Kong won. On April 13 at Lockdown, she teamed with ODB to defeat the team of Raisha Saeed and Kong in a tag team match. On May 11 at Sacrifice, Kim won a TNA Knockouts Makeover Battle Royal, which involved a battle royal and then a ladder match with the two remaining competitors, to become new one contender TNA Women's Knockout Championship. Kim competed for the championship on the May 15 episode of TNA Impact!, however failed to win the title. At Slammiversary on June 8, Kim teamed with ODB and Roxxi to defeat The Beautiful People (Angelina Love and Velvet Sky) and Moose in a six woman tag team match. Kim then went on to defeat Love on July 13 at Victory Road. Kim then teamed with ODB and Taylor Wilde to defeat the team of Kong and The Beautiful People on August 10 at Hard Justice, in her last TNA pay-per-view match. Kim's final match with TNA aired on the August 21 episode of TNA Impact! in a losing effort to Kong under street fight rules. Kim left TNA in mid-August 2008 after her contract expired.

=== Return to WWE (2008–2011) ===
After leaving TNA, Kim re-signed with WWE in late 2008. She made her return as a fan favorite on the March 27, 2009, episode of SmackDown, interrupting a WWE Divas Championship match between the villainous Diva's Champion, Maryse and Michelle McCool by attacking both competitors. Kim made her in-ring return on the March 30 episode of Raw in an 18-Diva tag team match. She made her first WrestleMania appearance in the 25-Diva Miss WrestleMania battle royal on April 5, 2009, at WrestleMania XXV. On the April 17 episode of SmackDown, Kim defeated then-Divas Champion Maryse. This earned her a championship match the following week, which she failed to win.

On the June 29 episode of Raw, Kim was traded to the Raw brand as part of a 15 wrestler tri-branded trade between Raw, SmackDown, and ECW. A few weeks later on the August 10 episode of Raw, she became number one contender for the Divas title by winning a Fatal 4-Way match against Beth Phoenix, Kelly Kelly, and Alicia Fox. She, however, was unsuccessful in winning the championship on the August 17 episode of Raw, when she faced then-champion Mickie James. At Bragging Rights on October 25, Kim, with Melina and Kelly Kelly, represented Raw in a losing effort to Michelle McCool, Beth Phoenix, and Natalya, representing SmackDown.

In early 2010, a tournament was held for the newly vacated Divas Championship, and Kim defeated Jillian Hall and Alicia Fox en route to the finals. The finals were originally to be held on February 21 at Elimination Chamber, but the match was changed to the team of Maryse and Kim versus Team LayCool (Michelle McCool and Layla), which was won by LayCool as a result of Maryse abandoning Kim during the match. A day prior on the February 22 episode of Monday Night Raw! Gail faced Maryse in the finals for the WWE Divas Title but was unsuccessful. Kim was a part of a 10-Diva tag team match, where she, Kelly Kelly, Eve Torres, Mickie James and Beth Phoenix were against Team LayCool, Alicia Fox, Vickie Guerrero, and Maryse, at WrestleMania XXVI on March 28 but where unsuccessful. At Fatal 4-Way on June 20, Kim challenged for the WWE Divas Championship in a Fatal 4-Way match that also involved then-champion Eve, Maryse, and Alicia Fox, but was unsuccessful as Fox won the match to become champion.

In early 2011, Kim participated in fewer matches on television, as she became the on-screen girlfriend of Daniel Bryan. She also began accompanying him to the ring during his matches. At that time, Bryan was managed by The Bella Twins (Nikki and Brie), and after they discovered Bryan kissing Kim backstage, they started a feud with her. The night after the Royal Rumble, Kim accompanied Bryan to ringside for his match against Tyson Kidd. After the match, the Bellas ended their association with Bryan.

For the first half of 2011, Kim feuded with Melina, due to Melina's claims that Kim was a "horrible friend". The matches between the two mainly took place on Superstars, and saw Kim emerging victorious in two singles matches on May 30 and June 23. On the August 1 episode of Raw, Kim participated in a battle royal to determine the number one contender for the Divas Championship, however, shortly after the match began, she eliminated herself. Kim later explained that WWE had instructed her to get eliminated from the match within the first minute, so she decided to just eliminate herself. She subsequently quit WWE. Kim later said that WWE did not grant her release, but would instead force her to stay with the promotion for the remainder of her contract. Kim's WWE.com profile was removed on September 30, indicating that she had officially left the company, and that her contract expired.

=== Return to TNA / Impact Wrestling (2011–2025) ===
==== Alliance with Karen Jarrett and Madison Rayne (2011–2012) ====
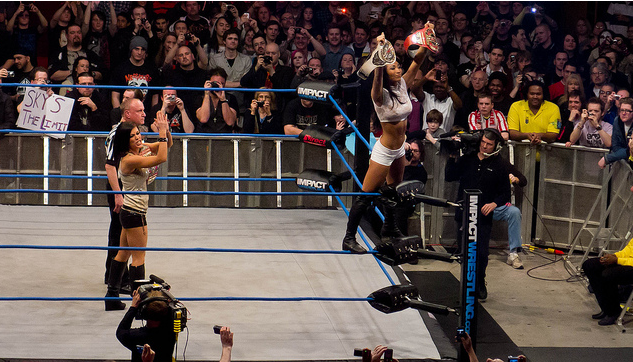
Kim and Madison Rayne in January 2012

Kim returned to Total Nonstop Action Wrestling (TNA) on the October 20 episode of Impact Wrestling, attacking TNA Knockouts Champion Velvet Sky and aligning herself with Madison Rayne and Karen Jarrett, thus establishing herself as a heel. On the October 27 episode of Impact Wrestling, Jarrett named Kim the #1 Contender to Sky's title, before she went on to defeat Tara in her first match back with the promotion. On the November 3 episode of Impact Wrestling, Kim and Rayne defeated TnT (Tara and Brooke Tessmacher) to win the TNA Knockouts Tag Team Championship. The following week they made their first title defense, defeating Velvet Sky and Mickie James. On November 13 at Turning Point, Kim defeated Sky to win the TNA Knockouts Championship for the second time, making her a double champion and only the second woman in TNA history, after her partner Madison Rayne, to hold both the Knockouts and the Knockouts Tag Team titles simultaneously. She made her first title defense on December 11 at Final Resolution, defeating Mickie James following interference from Madison Rayne. On the December 29 episode of Impact Wrestling, Kim retained her title against James following another interference from Rayne.

On the January 5, 2012, episode of Impact Wrestling, Kim and Rayne retained their tag team titles against James and Traci Brooks. Three days later at Genesis, Kim defeated James by disqualification to retain the Knockouts Championship. On February 12 at Against All Odds, Kim successfully defended the Knockouts Championship against Tara, during which Madison Rayne walked out on her Knockouts Tag Team Championship partner. On the following episode of Impact Wrestling, Rayne won a battle royal to become the number one contender to Kim's Knockouts Championship. In the following weeks, tension between Kim and Rayne began to be teased with the two negatively interfering in each other's matches. On the March 8 episode of Impact Wrestling, Kim and Rayne lost the Knockouts Tag Team Championship to Eric Young and ODB. On March 18 at Victory Road, Kim successfully defended the Knockouts Championship against Rayne. On the March 29 episode of Impact Wrestling, Kim and Rayne reconciled and remained together as a team. On April 15 at Lockdown, Kim defeated Velvet Sky in a steel cage match, following a distraction from Rayne, to retain her title. Afterwards, Kim went on a losing streak against Brooke Tessmacher, which led to TNA naming Tessmacher the number one contender to her title. On May 13 at Sacrifice, Kim defeated Tessmacher, pinning her with her feet on the ropes, for another successful title defense. On the following episode of Impact Wrestling, Kim successfully defended her title against Tessmacher and Velvet Sky in a three-way match. On May 20, Kim became the longest reigning TNA Knockouts Champion in history by breaking Madison Rayne's previous record of 188 days. On June 10 at Slammiversary, Kim lost the title to Miss Tessmacher, ending her reign at 210 days. Kim received her rematch for the title on the July 12 episode of Impact Wrestling, but was again defeated by Tessmacher.

==== Championship reigns (2013–2016) ====
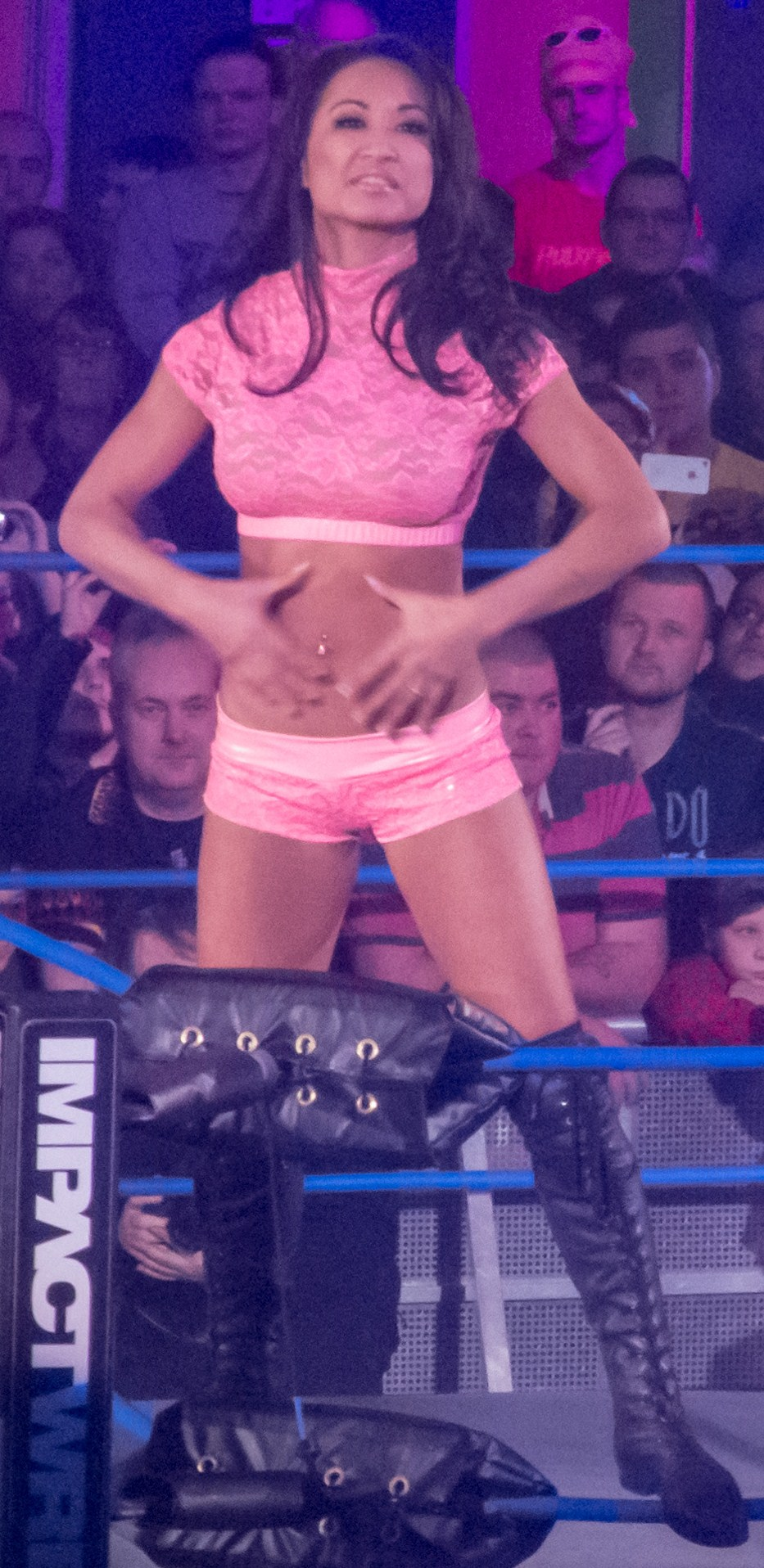
Kim in January 2013

On January 13, 2013, at the Genesis pay-per-view, Kim competed in a five-woman gauntlet match to determine the number one contender to the TNA Knockouts Championship. Kim eliminated Miss Tessmacher, ODB and Mickie James but was eventually eliminated by Velvet Sky after referee Taryn Terrell failed to notice Kim's foot under the ropes. Kim was defeated on the February 21 episode of Impact Wrestling, in a fatal four-way elimination match for the Knockouts Championship against champion Tara, Miss Tessmacher, and Velvet Sky after physical involvement from referee Taryn Terrell.

On March 10 at Lockdown, Kim unsuccessfully challenged Sky for her Knockouts Championship, after interference by referee Taryn Terrell. Kim then attacked Terrell backstage during an interview. On the following episode of Impact Wrestling, Terrell was placed on probation due to her actions. Later that night, Kim and Tara were defeated by Mickie James and Velvet Sky in a match officiated by Terrell, after Terrell violated her probation by slapping Kim. On the March 21 episode of Impact Wrestling, Terrell was terminated as Knockouts referee by Brooke Hogan, who then immediately signed Terrell to the Knockouts roster. On the April 4 episode of Impact Wrestling, Kim and Tara defeated Terrell and Sky, with Kim pinning Terrell for the win. The rivalry between Kim and Terrell culminated in a Last Knockout Standing match on June 2 at Slammiversary XI, which Terrell won.

On the July 11 episode of Impact Wrestling, Kim defeated Terrell in a ladder match to become the number one contender to the Knockouts Championship. Kim received her title opportunity on the July 25 episode of Impact Wrestling, against champion Mickie James; Kim lost the match and afterwards, confronted referee ODB after she failed to see a dirty pin, beginning a feud between the two. On August 15 at Impact Wrestling: Hardcore Justice, ODB pinned Kim in a three-way hardcore match, which also included James. Kim and ODB faced off once again in a number one contender two out of three falls match on the August 29 episode of Impact Wrestling, which ODB won after making Kim submit for the first time ever in her career, to score the last fall. On October 20 at Bound for Glory, Kim defeated ODB and Brooke in a three-way match, following interference from her new ally Lei'D Tapa, to win her third TNA Knockouts Championship.

Kim made her first televised defense on the October 31 episode of Impact Wrestling, defeating ODB in a rematch. When Kim and Tapa attacked ODB on the December 12 episode of Impact Wrestling, Kim's former tag team partner Madison Rayne returned to help ODB.

Rayne received her championship match on January 16 at Impact Wrestling: Genesis, which she won, ending Kim's reign at 88 days. The rivalry between Kim and Rayne continued as the two competed in a street fight on the February 20 episode of Impact Wrestling, which Kim won after a distraction by Tapa. At Lockdown, Kim was unsuccessful in regaining the Knockouts Championship in a steel cage match. On the March 13 episode of Impact Wrestling, tension between Kim and Tapa began to show when Kim lost to the debuting Brittany after Tapa accidentally attacked Kim. After the match, a brawl between Kim and Tapa ensued, disbanding their alliance.

Kim saved Rayne from an attack from The Beautiful People (Angelina Love and Velvet Sky) on the April 24 episode of Impact Wrestling turning face, but later lost a tag team match against The Beautiful People with Rayne as her partner. Kim and Love continued their feud, attacking each other on different occasions. On the June 12 episode of Impact Wrestling, Kim defeated Brittany and Madison Rayne to become the number one contender to Love's championship. Kim faced Love for the championship on June 15 at Slammiversary, but she was unsuccessful in winning the title.

Kim received a rematch against Love for the Knockouts Championship on the July 3 episode of Impact Wrestling, where Kim won the championship for a fourth time. In her first title defense, Kim successfully retained her championship against Love, Madison Rayne and Brittany in a four-way match on the July 10 episode of Impact Wrestling. On the July 31 episode of Impact Wrestling, Kim successfully defended her championship against Taryn Terrell after the match went to a no-contest due to interference from The Beautiful People. Following a backstage attack by Love, on a special Hardcore Justice edition of Impact Wrestling, Kim ended her feud with The Beautiful People when she defeated Love in a Last Knockout Standing match with her Knockouts Championship on the line.

Kim successfully defended her title against Taryn Terrell on the September 3 episode of Impact Wrestling. After the match, Kim and Terrell were both attacked by the debuting Havok. In September, Kim suffered a separated shoulder and torn ligaments during a pre-match brawl with Havok. Going against doctor's advice, Kim defended her title later that night and lost her championship to Havok. Kim returned to Impact Wrestling in November, demanding her rematch for the Knockouts title against Havok, which Kim ultimately lost.

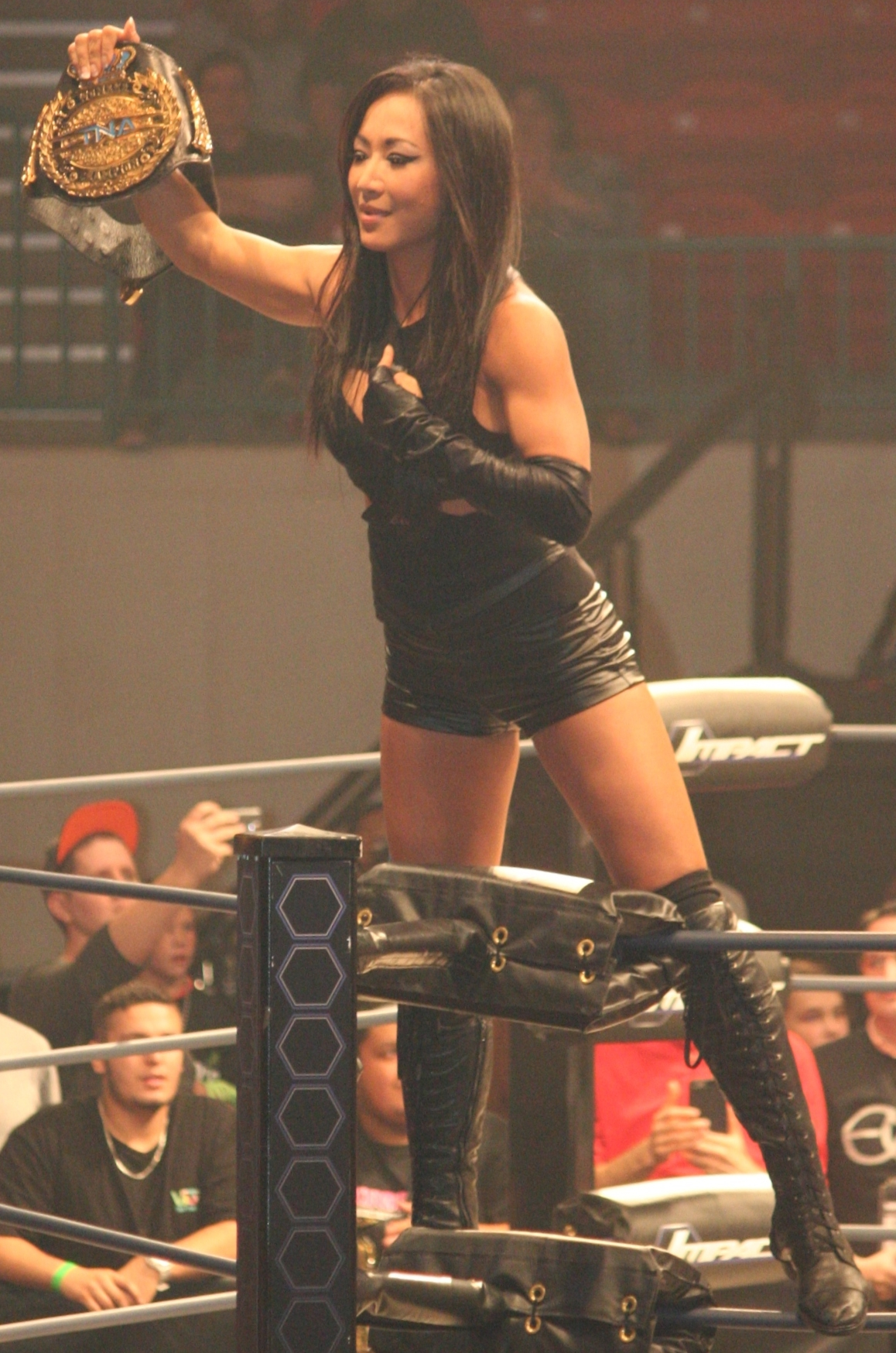
Kim as TNA Knockouts Champion in 2015

On the January 30, 2015, episode of Impact Wrestling, in a three-way match for the Knockouts Championship, Kim and Madison Rayne lost to the defending champion, Taryn Terrell. On the May 1 episode of Impact Wrestling, Kim started an alliance with Awesome Kong to feud with Terrell, Jade and Marti Bell, collectively known as The Dollhouse. The following week, Kim and Kong were defeated by The Dollhouse in a three–on–two handicap match. Kim sustained an arm injury on the May 29 episode of Impact Wrestling, after unsuccessfully challenging Terrell for the Knockouts Championship in a steel cage match and being attacked by The Dollhouse afterwards.

After some hiatus, Kim returned on the July 15 episode of Impact Wrestling, portraying a superhero-like character and attacking Jade, which allowed Brooke to win the Knockouts Championship. On the September 16 episode of Impact Wrestling, Kim won her fifth Knockouts Championship by winning a four-way match also involving Brooke, Lei'D Tapa and Awesome Kong. Kim successfully retained the championship against Kong at Bound for Glory on October 4. During October and November (taped in July), she participated in the TNA World Title Series, where she ended first of her block, tied with Awesome Kong, advancing to the finals. on the December 2 episode of Impact Wrestling, Kim lost to the then current TNA X Division Championship Tigre Uno and was eliminated from the TNA World Title Series. On January 19, 2016, Kim defended her title against Kong. She then lost her title to Jade in a three-way match also involving Madison Rayne after Maria hit Kim with her title belt on the April 5.

On the May 10 episode of Impact Wrestling, Kim faced Jade for the Knockouts championship, which she lost by DQ after Sienna attacked them. On the May 24 episode of Impact Wrestling, Kim defeated Sienna to keep her job, only to be attacked by Sienna and Maria. A week after, with EC3 as a manager for the night, Kim received a match against Maria at Slammiversary. At Slammiversary, her match with an injured Maria turned into a Triple Threat match for the Impact Knockouts Championship between her, Jade and Sienna (who eventually won the match).

==== Hall of Famer (2016–2017) ====
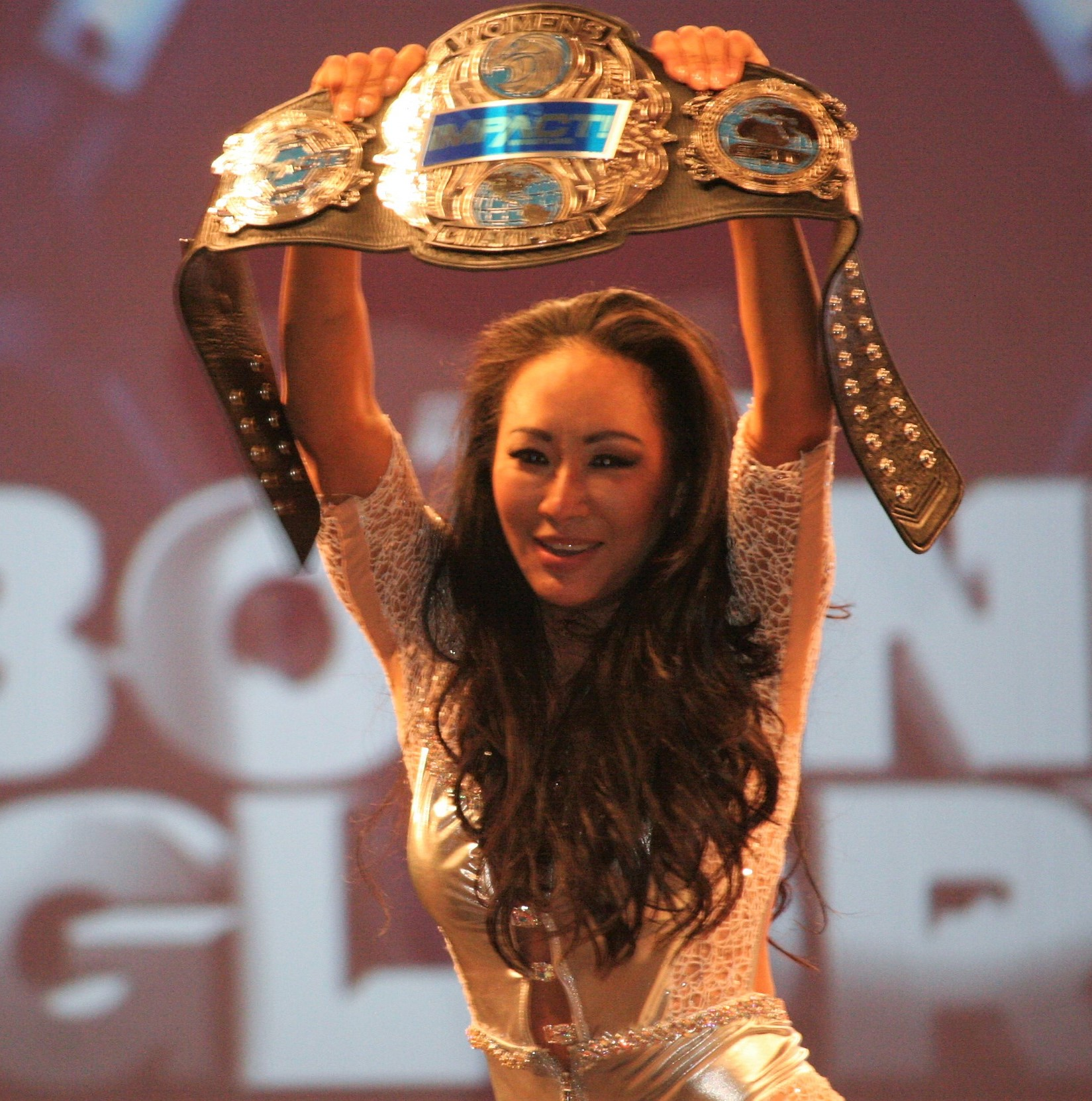
Kim as the Knockouts Champion at Bound for Glory in November 2017

On June 14, 2016, Kim was the first female inducted into the TNA Wrestling Hall of Fame. Shortly after, on October 2 at Bound for Glory she defeated Maria Kanellis for the Impact Women's Knockout Championship, winning the title for the record-tying sixth time which she had to vacate a week later after sustaining a back injury that forced her to take a few months off in-ring competition, during which Kim made a few appearances in November and December as she showed her support for Jade who feuded with Rosemary for the vacant championship.

On the July 6, 2017, episode of the recently rebranded GFW Impact!, Kim returned to state her (legit) intention to retire at the end of 2017. A month later, on August 17, at Destination X, Kim faced Sienna for the Unified GFW Knockouts Championship which she was unsuccessful to win due to interference by the return of her old rival Taryn Terrell. On November 5 at Bound for Glory (in what was supposed to be a fatal–four-way match between Kim, Sienna, Allie and Terrell but reverted to a three–way after Terrell's release from the company) Kim competed in her final match where she won the Impact Knockouts Championship for a record-breaking seventh time. The next night, she retired from professional wrestling and vacated the title in the process.

==== Producer and departure (2018–2025) ====
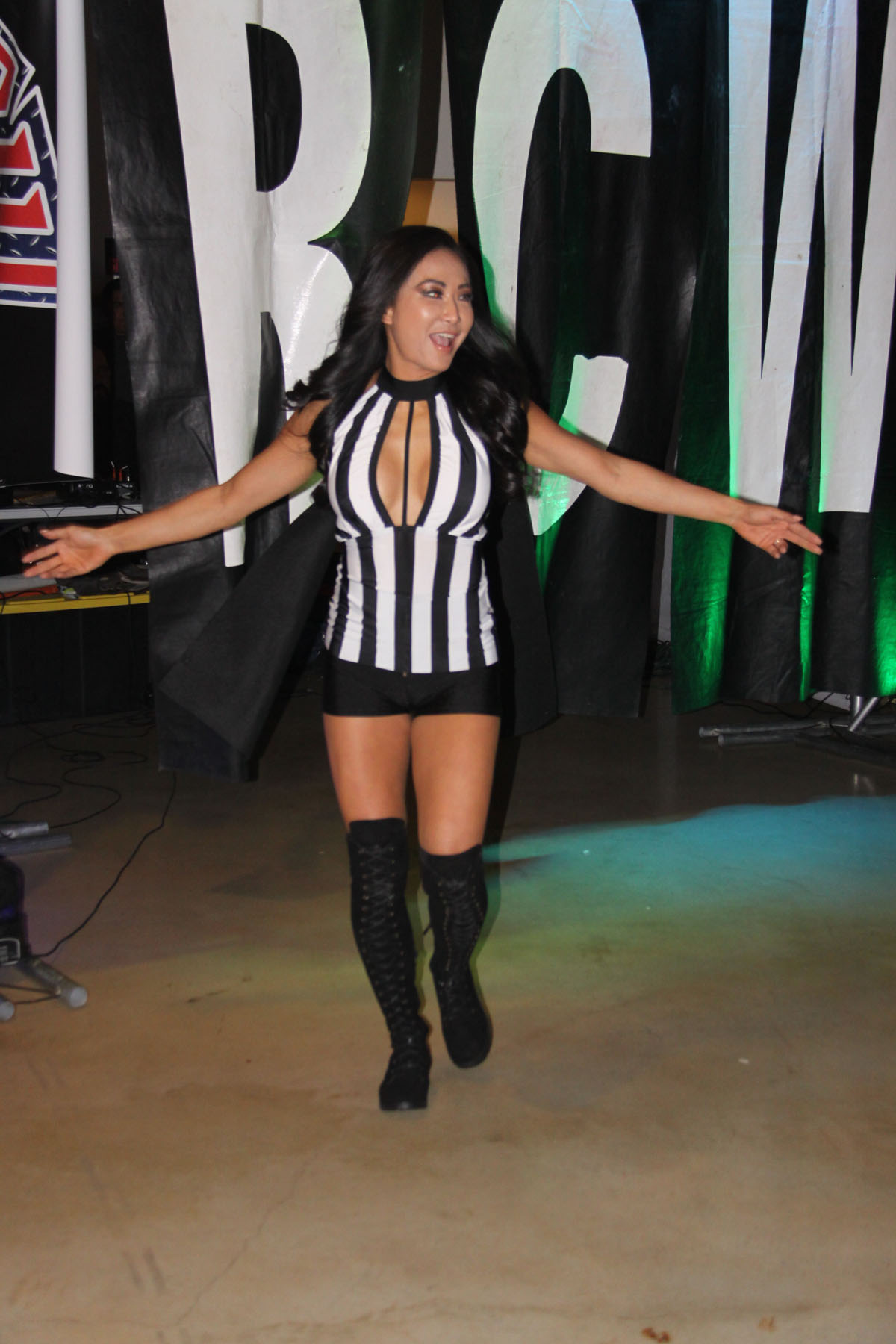
Kim working as a special referee in 2019

Kim wrestled what was supposed to be the final match of her career on February 3, 2018, for Southside Wrestling in Stevenage, United Kingdom, where she defeated Kasey Owens in the main event of the show. After this retirement, Kim returned to Impact Wrestling as a producer and agent (talent development roles in which a seasoned, active or retired performer is a behind-the-scenes coach to active wrestlers on how to improve, and how to handle the day-to-day demands of being a wrestler).

In late–November, Kim was inserted in the feud between Taya Valkyrie and Tessa Blanchard, after the latter had retained her title by attacking the referee. In December, in order to prevent any shenanigans from their upcoming match, Kim was introduced as the guest referee for the next encounter between the two Knockouts, that was set for January 6, 2019, at Impact Wrestling Homecoming. At the event, after she attacked Kim multiple times, Blanchard lost the Impact Wrestling Knockouts Championship to Valkyrie after Kim used her finishing move "Eat Defeat" on Tessa Blanchard. Throughout the next few months, the feud between Kim and Blanchard progressed even further as both attacked each other inside and outside the ring (including at the restaurant of Kim's husband). This led to a match between the two, at Impact Wrestling Rebellion on April 28, in which Blanchard defeated Kim in what was officially Kim's last match. After the match the two women embraced and in a backstage interview Kim confirmed that she is still going to work as a producer for the company. By February 2024, her backstage roles expanded to include working as a member of the creative team. On March 25, 2025, she was fired from TNA, ending her 14-year tenure with the company.

== Legacy ==
Kim has been praised as one of the greatest female wrestlers ever. Former Knockouts Champion ODB named Kim "the greatest Knockout ever". Wrestling journalist Dave Meltzer commented that Kim "was so ahead of her time." Although references of Kim were ultimately dropped by WWE following her second departure, in 2021, WWE Network included her in a list of Top 50 female performers in the history of the company.

== Personal life ==
Kim married celebrity chef Robert Irvine on May 11, 2012. The couple met on the set of Dinner: Impossible. On October 10, 2017, Kim became an American citizen, and now holds dual Canadian/US citizenship.

== Other media ==
Kim posed topless for a cell phone ad campaign in South Korea. In 2007, Kim was listed on Forbes' top 40 list of "America's Most Eligible Bachelorettes". In 2009, Kim was a part of the cast of the independent psychological thriller entitled Royal Kill. On October 13, 2011, Gail Kim, along with The Miz, John Morrison, Kofi Kingston, Heath Slater and Eve Torres appeared on a special WWE edition of Family BrainSurge. On August 18, 2012, Kim's and Robert Irvine's wedding ceremony was documented on an episode of Irvine's Restaurant: Impossible program. Gail also appeared with her husband, Robert, on an episode of Guy's Family Road Trip.

In March 2020, Kim, along with Lita and Christy Hemme, launched "KAYfABE", a new wrestling show inspired by true events which blends scripted drama with pro wrestling.

Kim appeared in the video games WWE SmackDown vs. Raw 2010 and WWE SmackDown vs. Raw 2011 during her second and final run with WWE.

In July 2023, Kim and fellow wrestler, Gisele Shaw, took part in the ninth season of The Amazing Race Canada, in which they were eliminated first. Kim was then a contestant on the second season of The Traitors Canada in October 2024.

== Filmography ==
Film and Television

Year	Title	Role	Notes
2009	Royal Kill	Assassin	
2009	Dinner: Impossible	Herself	Episode: “WWE: A Mission on the Mat”
2011	BrainSurge	Herself	episode 314
2012	Restaurant: Impossible	Herself	
2017	Ballerina I’m Not	Herself	Documentary
2018	Love	Marge’s Opponent	Episode: “Bertie’s Birthday”
2020	Learning The Ropes	Herself	Documentary
2023	The Amazing Race Canada	Herself	Contestant; Season 9
2024	The Traitors Canada	Herself	Contestant; Season 2

Podcasts

Year	Title	Role	Notes
2019-2024	Ring The Belle	Herself	4 episodes

== Championships and accomplishments ==
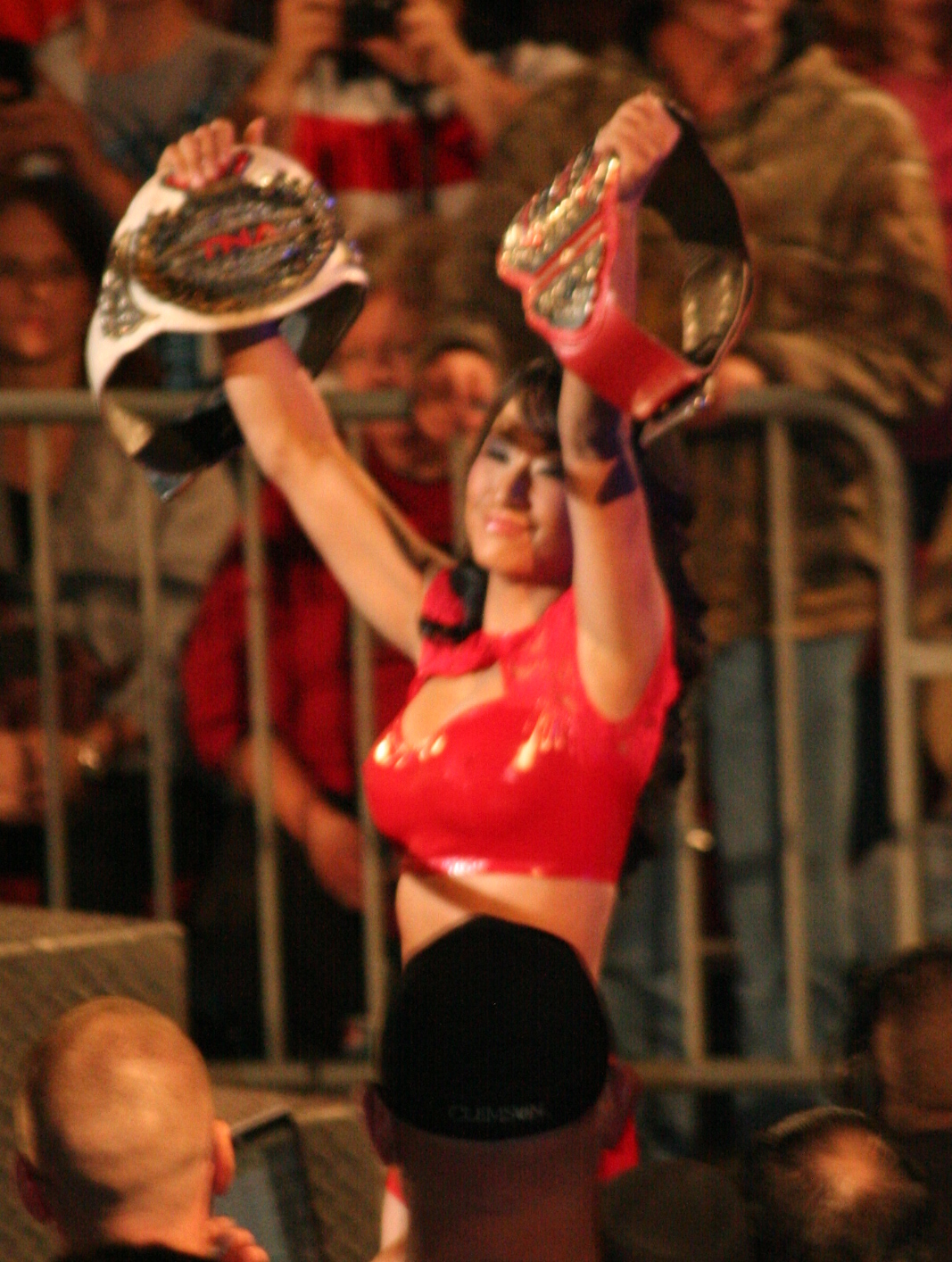
Kim is the inaugural and record seven-time TNA / Impact Knockouts Champion (right hand) and a one-time TNA Knockouts Tag Team Champion

- Apocalypse Wrestling Federation
  - Diva of the Year (2001)
  - ABC Women's Championship (1 time)
- The Baltimore Sun
  - Woman of the Year (2007)
- Funkin' Conservatory
  - FC Women's Championship (1 time)
- Canadian Pro-Wrestling Hall of Fame
  - Class of 2025 - Female Wrestler
- Cauliflower Alley Club
  - Women's Wrestling Award (2015)
- Imperial Wrestling Revolution
  - IWR Diamond Championship (1 time, inaugural)
- Pro Wrestling Illustrated
  - Stanley Weston Award (2024)
  - Ranked No. 1 of the top 50 female wrestlers in the PWI Female 50 in 2012
- Total Nonstop Action Wrestling / Impact Wrestling
  - TNA / Impact Knockouts Championship (7 times, inaugural)
  - TNA Knockouts Tag Team Championship (1 time) – with Madison Rayne
  - Gauntlet for the Gold (2007, 2016 – Knockouts)
  - Queen of the Knockouts (2013)
  - World Cup (2015) – with Jeff Hardy, Gunner, Rockstar Spud, Davey Richards, and Crazzy Steve
  - TNA Hall of Fame (2016)
  - TNA Year End Award (1 time)
    - Knockout of the Year (2007)
- World Wrestling Entertainment
  - WWE Women's Championship (1 time)

== Luchas de Apuestas record ==
Winner (wager)	Loser (wager)	Location	Event	Date	Notes
Gail Kim (hair)	Roxxi Laveaux (hair)	Orlando, Florida	Sacrifice	May 11, 2008	(Note: This was a ladder match.)
