= Jackie French Koller =

American novelist

- Born: 1948 (age 77–78)
- Occupation: Author
- Writing career
- Genres: Children's literature, Young adult literature, Historical fiction
- Website: www.jackiefrenchkoller.com

Jackie French Koller (born 1948) is an American author of picture books, chapter books, and novels for children and young adults. She lives and writes in western Massachusetts. Koller is also a painter. Her interest in art inspired her to open The Little Black Dog Gallery in Westfield, Massachusetts. Koller's young-adult novel If I Had One Wish was adapted into a Disney Channel Original Movie under the title You Wish!.

== Selected works ==
- Baby for Sale (Marshall Cavendish, 2002): ISBN 9780761451068.
- The Falcon
- If I Had One Wish
- Last Voyage of the Misty Day
- No Such Thing (Boyds Mills Press, 2012): ISBN 9781590789117.
- One Monkey Too Many
- A Place to Call Home
- The Primrose Way
- Someday
- Nothing to Fear
