= If I Had One Wish =

1991 novel by Jackie French Koller

If I Had One Wish...
- Author: Jackie French Koller
- Language: English
- Genre: Fiction
- Publisher: Little, Brown & Company
- Publication date: 1991
- Publication place: United States
- Media type: Print
- Pages: 161
- ISBN: 0440408075
- OCLC: 858008528
- Adapted as You Wish! (2003)

If I Had One Wish is a young adult novel by Jackie French Koller, about a teenager named Alec Lansing, whose little brother Stevie is always getting him in trouble. The book was first published in 1991.

== Plot ==
One day an old woman grants Alec one wish for his kindness to her. Alec uses it to wish that his little brother Stevie had never been born; to his horror, it comes true. Although no one else remembers Stevie, and Alec's life is in some ways better now, he is still guilt-stricken, and desperately tries to find a way to reverse his wish.

== Adaptation ==
In 2003, the story was adapted as a Disney Channel Original Movie titled You Wish!.

== First edition ==
- Little, Brown & Co., 1991 (ISBN 0-316-50150-6)
