= Royal Kill =

2009 film by Babar Ahmed

- Directed by: Babar Ahmed
- Written by: Babar Ahmed
- Starring: Eric Roberts; Alexander Wraith; Lalaine; Gail Kim; Pat Morita
- Cinematography: Jonathan Belinski
- Edited by: J. D. Beales
- Music by: Kenneth Lampl
- Release date: April 10, 2009
- Running time: 90 min
- Country: United States
- Language: English
- Budget: $350,000
- Box office: $50,090

Royal Kill (also released under the title Ninja's Creed) is a 2009 American psychological action thriller film directed by Babar Ahmed and starring Eric Roberts and Pat Morita, along with Lalaine and professional wrestler Gail Kim. The film was released April 10, 2009 in theaters. The DVD release went by the name Ninja's Creed and went on sale July 20, 2010.

== Plot ==
Jan (Lalaine) is a teenage girl living in Washington, D.C. Unbeknownst to her, the Skanji regime murdered the Kingdom of Samarza's royal family, therefore making her the remaining heir to the throne. A Samarzan warrior journeys to D.C. to bring Jan back to lead the Samarzan people and protect her from the Skanji assassin sent to eliminate her.

== Cast ==
- Eric Roberts as Dad
- Gail Kim as Nadia
- Lalaine as Jan
- Alexander Wraith as Adam Arthavan
- Jeannie Crist as Royal Maid
- Nicole Brown as Andrea
- Darren Kendrick as Neighbor
- James Yun as Cop #2
- Darren Paul Kendrick as Chess Buddy
- Bobby Routh
- Pat Morita as Exhibition Manager

=== Notes ===
- This is Pat Morita's last recorded role; he died in 2005 shortly after the completion of the film.
- Professional wrestlers Gail Kim and James Yun, who both worked for World Wrestling Entertainment at the time, made their movie debuts with this film.

== Production ==
The film was shot in Washington, D.C. in 2005.

== Viral video ==
On April 7, 2009, the producers of Royal Kill held an informal press conference with the film's director, lead actress, and composer. In addition, two supposed "experts" were present to discuss the Nepalese royal massacre as the basis for the story. When the topic was brought up, a woman in the audience started to berate one of the experts before approaching her and slamming her head into a table. A brief fight ensued before the attacker was pulled away. She then hopped into a waiting car.

Video of the incident was posted to YouTube and other internet video sites, eventually being viewed millions of times. Some suspected that it was staged.

In fact, both women involved were professional wrestlers hired to do a stunt in hopes of attracting attention to the low-budget film. The attacker was noted wrestler Shelly Martinez. A video later appeared showing the participants rehearsing and discussing the incident.

== Release ==
Royal Kill had a limited release in some AMC Theatres in Los Angeles, Chicago and Washington, D.C. on April 10, 2009.

It was one of the lowest-budgeted movies ever to play at AMC. After a successful first week in theaters, Royal Kill's theatrical run was extended to a second and then a third week.

== Reception ==
The film received primarily poor reviews. James Lasome of Horror Freak News called the movie "Fun, imaginative, and complex". However, most critics were not so enamored. Dan Zak, writing for The Washington Post, called the film "essentially storyless" with "deliriously bad filmmaking" and wrote that the special effects "look like they were created in Microsoft Paint."
