= You Wish! (film) =

2003 American fantasy comedy film released as a Disney Channel Original Movie

- Promotional poster
- Genre: Fantasy comedy
- Based on: If I Had One Wish by Jackie French Koller
- Teleplay by: Christopher Reed; Cynthia Carle
- Directed by: Paul Hoen
- Starring: A.J. Trauth; Spencer Breslin; Lalaine
- Music by: Richard Marvin
- Country of origin: United States
- Original language: English

Production
- Executive producers: Alan Sacks; David Brady; Tim O'Brien
- Producer: Robert Florio
- Cinematography: Donald Duncan
- Editors: Debra Light; Terry Stokes
- Running time: 84 minutes
- Production company: Alan Sacks Productions

Original release
- Network: Disney Channel
- Release: January 10, 2003

You Wish! is a 2003 American fantasy comedy film released as a Disney Channel Original Movie and based on Jackie French Koller's 1991 novel If I Had One Wish. The film was directed by Paul Hoen; it stars A. J. Trauth, Spencer Breslin and Lalaine. The film was filmed in Auckland, New Zealand. It was released on January 10, 2003, on the Disney Channel.

== Plot ==
16-year-old Alex Lansing is extremely tormented by his younger brother, Stevie, who constantly plays pranks on Alex, including buying a turkey from a pet adoption show and causing the Harbor High jocks, Gary and friends to slam a pizza on Alex's head. When Alex is forced to take Stevie to the mall with his friend James, Stevie receives a magical coin from Larry Pendragon, a kindly eccentric man, which allows him to wish anything, and proceeds to run off in the mall without telling Alex. Later, their parents punish Alex, having had enough with his carelessness and send him to bed early. Stevie gives Alex the coin to make amends, and Alex wishes that he had never had a little brother.

The next day, he wakes up to find that his wish has come true. Stevie is now a famous child actor named Terrence Russell McCormack who stars on a TV show called Where's Stevie?. Although now dating a cheerleader and popular at school, Alex has regretted when his new popular jock friends torment his old friends, Abby and James. Alex's new pet dog is nothing but creepy and annoys him with his snoring while his new girlfriend, Fiona the cheerleader, is revealed to be crude, mean, and bossy. After a while, Alex begins to miss Stevie, feeling lonely at home with their career-obsessed parents. Alex seeks out Terrance to explain to him that they are brothers, but is kicked out of his dressing room, Terrance thinking he is crazy. Alex reflects on his life with Stevie and realizes how much he cares about him and misses him. As Alex walks home, Terrance drives by and decides to walk with Alex, who he begins to consider a friend. When they realize this is happening because of the coin, Alex and Terrance set out to find it, enlisting the help of Abby once Alex convinces her they were friends prior to his wish. The three locate Larry Pendragon, but he had to close his shop and has already sold off the coin.

After saying goodbye to Abby, Alex and Terrance are caught by the police and are taken to Alex's home where Terrance's caretaker comes to get him with the intention of covering up his absence. Terrance gets a call from his mother and is excited as he had the best night of his life, but is quickly disappointed when he learns his mother is getting remarried. Alex and Terrance share a brotherly hug and say goodbye and Alex slips into a depression because he has no chance of returning to his previous world.

The next day, while Alex is trying to find something on TV that does not remind him of his relationship with Stevie, his father gives him a bunch of old coins he bought to try to cheer him up. Alex throws them across the room, then discovers that one is the magic coin. Alex retrieves it, but his shout of excitement frightens his parents and they decide to break his door down when he refuses to open it. Before they can, Alex wishes that he never made the first wish and wakes up back in his own world. Alex excitedly embraces Stevie and his friends and asks Abby out, then yelling to a passing Fiona that he is not her boyfriend, confusing everyone. Later, Alex, James and Abby go skating and take Stevie with them and try to teach him to skate. He gives up, but then uses the coin to become a great skater.

== Cast ==
- A. J. Trauth as Alex Lansing
- Spencer Breslin as Stevie Lansing / Terrence Russell McCormack
- Lalaine as Abby Ramirez
- Tim Reid as Larry Pendragon
- Peter Feeney as David Carl "Dave" Lansing
- Joshua Leys as Gary
- Sally Stockwell as Pam Lansing
- Ari Boyland as James Cooper
- Emma Lahana as Fiona
- Jay Ryan as Charles
- Jodie Rimmer as Zoe
- Stephen Butterworth as Ronald

Credits adapted from Rotten Tomatoes.

== Production ==
The film was shot in New Zealand, at Studio West in West Auckland. Some scenes were shot at Takapuna Grammar School.

== Critical reception ==
Writing for Los Angeles Times, Mark Sachs praised You Wish! for its cast, script, and direction, calling the film "one of the best efforts of the basic cable outfit's original-movie franchise".

== Soundtrack ==
The soundtrack included numerous songs, including:

- "You Wish!" performed by Lalaine
- "Now And Again" performed by Mavin (as Badge)
- "A Thousand Miles" performed by Vanessa Carlton
- "Life is Good" performed by Junk
- "World of Our Own" performed by Westlife
- "Follow My Heart" performed by REO Speedwagon
