= Lalaine =

American actress and musician (born 1987)

- Born: Lalaine Vergara-Paras; June 3, 1987 (age 39); Burbank, California, U.S.
- Occupations: Actress; singer-songwriter; musician
- Years active: 1999–present
- Musical career
- Genres: Pop; alternative rock
- Instruments: Vocals; bass guitar
- Labels: Warner Bros.; LCV
- Formerly of: Vanity Theft

Lalaine Vergara-Paras (born June 3, 1987) is an American actress, singer-songwriter, and bassist. She is best known for her roles as Miranda Sanchez in Lizzie McGuire, Abby Ramirez in You Wish!, and Kate in the 1999 remake of Annie.

After appearing in the roles of Young Cosette and Éponine in a Broadway musical production of Les Misérables as a child, Lalaine pursued a career in music. She signed with Warner Bros. Records following the end of Lizzie McGuire and released one studio album and one extended play, both of which saw little commercial success.

== Early life ==
Lalaine Vergara-Paras was born in Burbank, California, to Filipino parents. She has three older siblings. She spent most of her early years in Burbank and Sherman Oaks, California, then joined the Broadway National Touring cast of Les Misérables as Little Cosette. After the tour, Lalaine and her mother resided in Sherman Oaks.

== Career ==
=== Acting career ===
Lalaine is normally credited by her first name only, later stating in 2019 that she didn't use her surname because it sounded too "Hispanic/ethnic". Her acting career began when she was cast in the Broadway production of Les Misérables in the roles of Young Cosette and Eponine. Lalaine made her film debut in 1999 as Theresa in Borderline. Lalaine co-starred with Alicia Morton as Kate in the 1999 remake of Annie. Annie aired on The Wonderful World of Disney on November 7, 1999. In 2000, she was cast as Miranda Sanchez on the Disney Channel teen sitcom Lizzie McGuire, alongside Hilary Duff. She appeared in 59 episodes until a "falling-out (that was) beyond repair" with Duff in the final stretch of filming of the television series led to her being let go early from her contract. "I don't believe that Hilary wanted her to be part of the movie," Lizzie McGuire casting director Robin Lippin said. "It probably would have been uncomfortable for both of them." As a result, Lalaine missed the last 6 episodes produced for the show, which wrapped up filming in late June 2002. Lalaine was also absent in The Lizzie McGuire Movie which filmed about 4–5 months after the show wrapped up filming. At the time of the movie, Lalaine was doing concert tours with Radio Disney and filming You Wish!.

=== After Lizzie McGuire ===
She starred alongside A.J. Trauth, Spencer Breslin, and Tim Reid in the 2003 Disney Channel Original Movie You Wish! as Abby Ramirez. Lalaine portrayed Chloe, a young Slayer-In-Training who dies by suicide, on the television series Buffy the Vampire Slayer.

In 2005, she starred alongside Eric Roberts and Pat Morita in Royal Kill, which was eventually given a full release in 2009. In 2010, Lalaine also appeared in Easy A starring Emma Stone in a small role as a gossiping girl. In July 2011, Lalaine was featured in a Shane Dawson video titled "Urban Legendz". She was also featured in another one of Shane's videos titled "Hot Chick or Cat Lady?". In 2018, Lalaine starred as Stacy in the film One Night Alone. Lalaine has since starred in two new movies The Man with the Red Balloon as Green Balloon/Balloonless Woman and Definition Please as Krista. Lalaine and former All That star Lori Beth Denberg co-starred in the web series Raymond and Lane. In 2019, Lalaine guest starred on Christy's Kitchen Throwback starring former Even Stevens and Kim Possible star Christy Carlson Romano.

In 2024, Lalaine was announced as the narrator for the audiobook version of Ashley Spencer's Disney High: The Untold Story of the Rise and Fall of Disney Channel's Tween Empire.

=== Music career ===
In 2003, Lalaine released her only album Inside Story. Lalaine wrote six songs on the album, including "Life Is Good", "Can't Stop", and "Save Myself". She worked with Radio Disney, performing her songs in Southern California, and went to Hawaii with Disney's Imagineers to promote Inside Story. That same year she was signed to Warner Bros. Records and released her only EP Haunted.

In 2005, she performed on the last episode of All That. The following year, she released a single, "I'm Not Your Girl" and remade the song "Cruella DeVil" for the albums DisneyMania 3 and Disneyremixmania. In 1999, she sang on the soundtrack for Annie. In 2004, Lalaine sang "If You Wanna Rock" on the soundtrack for the Disney Channel Original Movie Pixel Perfect.

She played bass guitar in the band Vanity Theft in 2010. In 2011, Lalaine was asked to leave Vanity Theft.

In 2011, Lalaine sang on the song "Different" as part of the "Artists Against Hate".

== Legal issues ==
In July 2007, Lalaine was arrested and charged with felony possession of methamphetamine. Lalaine pleaded guilty to the felony possession charge. A $50,000 bench warrant was issued for Lalaine after failing to appear at a mandatory court hearing regarding her case. The bench warrant was later recalled by the judge. She completed court mandated drug rehabilitation at a facility in Long Beach, California. The felony possession charge was expunged upon completion of the program, as part of her plea deal.

== Filmography ==
=== Film ===
Year	Title	Role	Notes
2004	Promised Land	Norma	
2004	Debating Robert Lee	Debator	
2007	Her Best Move	Tutti	Distributed by Summertime Films
2009	Royal Kill	Jan	Released on DVD as "Ninja's Creed"
2010	Easy A	Gossipy Girl	Cameo
2018	One Night Alone	Stacy	
2015	The Man with the Red Balloon	Green Balloon/Balloonless Woman	Short film
2020	Definition Please	Krista	

=== Television ===
Year	Title	Role	Notes
1999	Borderline	Theresa	Television film
1999	Annie	Katherine "Kate"	Television film
2001–04	Lizzie McGuire	Miranda Sanchez	Disney Channel Original Series; 59/65 episodes (was not in The Lizzie McGuire Movie)
2001–06	Express Yourself	Herself	A series of short segments shown on Disney Channel
2003	Buffy the Vampire Slayer	Chloe/First Evil	2 episodes
2003	You Wish!	Abigail "Abby" Ramirez	Disney Channel Original Movie
2005	Disney 411	Herself	1 episode
2005	All That	Herself	1 episode (final episode)
2005	What's Stevie Thinking?	Miranda Sanchez	An unsold television pilot produced for Disney Channel
2006	Lagot ka, isusumbong kita!	Herself/host	Lalaine's adventure in the Philippines

=== Web series ===
Year	Show	Role	Notes
2008	ElisaVictoriaTV	Herself	2 episodes
2009–13	Off The Clock	Various characters	8 episodes
2011	Vanity Theft – VT Tour Diary	Herself	7 episode
2012	Dream Journal	Lady Smoking	1 episode
2015	Raymond & Lane	Lily	1 episode
2019	Christy's Kitchen Throwback	Herself	1 episode

== Discography ==
=== Albums ===
- 2003 - Inside Story

=== Soundtracks ===
- 1999 - Annie (1999 film soundtrack)
- 2004 - Pixel Perfect
- 2005 - Disneymania 3
- 2005 - Disneyremixmania

=== EPs ===
- 2004 - Haunted EP

=== Singles ===
- 2003 - "You Wish"
- 2005 - "I'm Not Your Girl"

=== Other songs ===
- "Did You Hear About Us?" – B-side of "I'm Not Your Girl"

== Awards and nominations ==
Year	Award	Category	Role	Result
2000	Young Artist Award	Young Artist Award For Best Performance in a Feature Film or TV Movie – Young Ensemble	Kate in Annie	Nominated
2002	Young Artist Award	Best Ensemble in a TV Series (Comedy or Drama)	Miranda Sanchez in Lizzie McGuire	Nominated
2002	Young Artist Award	Best Performance in a TV Comedy Series – Supporting Young Actress	Miranda Sanchez in Lizzie McGuire	Won
2003	Imagen Award	Best Supporting Actress in Television	Miranda Sanchez in Lizzie McGuire	Nominated
2003	Young Artist Award	Best Ensemble in a TV Series (Comedy or Drama)	Miranda Sanchez in Lizzie McGuire	Nominated
