= Babar Ahmed (director) =

American film director

Babar Ahmed (Pashto: بابر احمد) is a Pakistani-American film director and writer based in America.

== Personal life ==
Ahmed is a graduate of University of Cambridge and University College London, and has taken film courses at New York University and New York Film Academy, where he was inspired to pursue filmmaking. Ahmed traces his family lineage to the Swat District in Pakistan.

== Career ==
Ahmed has produced videos for the International Monetary Fund and World Bank on topics such as global aging and urban development.

Genius was Ahmed's debut film and was released direct to video in America.

His second film Royal Kill, also known as Ninja's Creed was released theatrically in 2009 and featured supporting performances by Eric Roberts and Pat Morita.

Ahmed wrote and directed the 2014 movie Amka and the Three Golden Rules. The film received positive reviews, particularly for the performances of the lead actors.

Ahmed is the writer and director on Tikkun Olam (2021), a short narrative film about the encounter of an eight year old boy and a homeless veteran in Washington, D.C. The film premiered at the 19th Garden State Film Festival. Michael Sullivan for the Daily Times said, "Every beat of the story feels authentic, avoiding any hint of melodrama. Pure visual storytelling heightens the emotional engagement and escalating tension, with barely three or four lines of dialogue in the entire film."

Ahmed’s screenplay Lost in DC was a finalist in 2021 at the 52nd Nashville Film Festival.

== Filmography ==
- Genius (2003)
- Royal Kill (2009)
- Amka and The Three Golden Rules (2014)
- Tikkun Olam (short) (2021)
