= UB Post =

Tri-weekly English language newspaper based in Ulaanbaatar, Mongolia

- Type: Daily newspaper
- Format: Print, online
- Owner: Mongol News Media Group
- Founded: 1996
- Language: English

The UB Post is an English-language tri-weekly newspaper published in Ulaanbaatar, the capital of Mongolia. Founded in 1996, the newspaper has both print (in English) and online editions (in English, Italian and Spanish).

The UB in the paper's title is a common shorthand for Ulaanbaatar.

The paper was founded by Tserendorjiin Baldorj, the late President of the Mongol News Media Group. Also under MNMG's ownership are the national daily newspaper Unuudur, sports weekly newspaper Tavan Tsagarig ("The Five Rings"), which stopped publishing in 2016, the Sunday newspaper Nyam Garig, and the Channel 25 TV station.

Editor in Chief of the newspaper is G. Ulziisaikhan.
